= 2013–14 División de Honor Femenina de Waterpolo =

Women's water polo season

División de Honor Femenina 2013–14
- League: División de Honor
- Sport: women's water polo
- Duration: October 2013–May 3, 2014 (regular season); May 14–May 24 (championship playoff)
- Teams: 12
- League champions: Sabadell Astralpool
- Runners-up: Mataró La Sirena
- Top scorer: Helena Lloret, 85 goals
- Relegated to Primera División: L'Hospitalet, WP 98 02 & La Latina

División de Honor seasons
- ← 2012–13 2014–15 →

The 2013–14 season was the 27th season of División de Honor, the top flight women's water polo in Spain since its inception in 1988.

The season comprised regular season and championship playoff. The regular season started on October 19, 2013, and finished on May 3, 2014. When finish the regular season, top four teams at standings play championship playoff.

Championship playoff began on May 14 with semifinals, playing the Finals around late May.

Sabadell Astralpool won the twelfth title in its history, and fourth in a row by defeating (again as in previous season) Mataró La Sirena 2–0 in the Championship Finals.

== Teams ==
División de Honor de Waterpolo Femenino 2013–14 teams

Team	City/Area	Founded	Pool	website
Sabadell Astralpool	Sabadell	1916	Can Llong	
Mataró La Sirena	Mataró	1932	Joan Serra	
Madrid Moscardó	Madrid	1958	Piscina CDM Moscardó	
Mediterrani	Barcelona	1931	Josep Vallès	
Sant Andreu	Barcelona	1971	Pere Serrat	
Zaragoza	Zaragoza	1984	Piscina Stadium Casablanca	
Dos Hermanas	Dos Hermanas	1993	Piscina CMAD Montequinto	
Terrassa	Terrassa	1932	Àrea Olímpica	
La Latina	Madrid	1969	Piscina M-86	
WP 98 02	Pamplona	1998	Piscina UPNA	
Rubí	Rubí	1971	Can Rosés	
L'Hospitalet	L'Hospitalet	1971	Piscines Municipals	

== Regular season standings ==
	Team	P	W	D	L	GF	GA	GD	Pts
1	Sabadell Astralpool	22	22	0	0	483	81	402	66
2	Mataró La Sirena	22	18	1	3	255	139	116	55
3	Sant Andreu	22	14	4	4	278	186	92	46
4	Mediterrani	22	13	4	5	250	173	77	43
5	Rubí	22	11	2	9	230	231	−1	35
6	Terrassa	22	10	4	8	218	212	6	34
7	Madrid Moscardó	22	10	1	11	188	223	−35	31
8	Zaragoza	22	7	3	12	217	256	−39	24
9	Dos Hermanas	22	7	2	13	188	248	−60	23
10	La Latina	22	7	1	14	174	223	−49	22
11	L'Hospitalet	22	2	0	20	117	320	−203	6
12	WP 98 02	22	0	0	22	124	430	−306	0

Championship playoffs
Relegation playoff
Relegated

== Championship playoffs ==
Semifinals (best of 3)
1	Sabadell Astralpool	16	17
4	Mediterrani	5	4
2	Mataró La Sirena	11	10
3	Sant Andreu	6	6

Final (best of 3)
1	Sabadell Astralpool	10	11
2	Mataró La Sirena	6	7

=== Semifinals ===
==== 1st leg ====
May 14; 20:45 (UTC+2)	Report	Mediterrani	5–16	Sabadell Astralpool	Instal.lació Josep Vallès, Barcelona; Referees: Sánchez Martín, Campos Rodríguez
May 14; 20:45 (UTC+2)	Report	Score by quarters: 0–2, 1–4, 2–6, 2–4			Instal.lació Josep Vallès, Barcelona; Referees: Sánchez Martín, Campos Rodríguez
May 14; 20:45 (UTC+2)	Report	five players 1	Goals	Pareja, M García 3	Instal.lació Josep Vallès, Barcelona; Referees: Sánchez Martín, Campos Rodríguez

May 14; 20:45 (UTC+2)	Report	Sant Andreu	6–11	Mataró La Sirena	Piscina Pere Serrat, Barcelona; Referees: Trojan Bucic, Fuentes Flores
May 14; 20:45 (UTC+2)	Report	Score by quarters: 1–1, 2–1, 2–6, 1–3			Piscina Pere Serrat, Barcelona; Referees: Trojan Bucic, Fuentes Flores
May 14; 20:45 (UTC+2)	Report	Fajardo 2	Goals	Gibson-Byrne 4	Piscina Pere Serrat, Barcelona; Referees: Trojan Bucic, Fuentes Flores

==== 2nd leg ====
May 17; 11:30 (UTC+2)	Report	Sabadell Astralpool	17–4	Mediterrani	Piscina Can Llong, Sabadell; Referees: Guardia Marsal, Muntané Llavería
May 17; 11:30 (UTC+2)	Report	Score by quarters: 5–0, 5–1, 1–1, 6–2			Piscina Can Llong, Sabadell; Referees: Guardia Marsal, Muntané Llavería
May 17; 11:30 (UTC+2)	Report	Pareja 6	Goals	Gual 3	Piscina Can Llong, Sabadell; Referees: Guardia Marsal, Muntané Llavería

Sabadell Astralpool won series 2–0 and advanced to Final

May 17; 12:45 (UTC+2)	Report	Mataró La Sirena	10–6	Sant Andreu	Piscina Joan Serra, Mataró; Referees: Baños Martínez, Godoy Mena
May 17; 12:45 (UTC+2)	Report	Score by quarters: 4–2, 3–2, 3–1, 0–1			Piscina Joan Serra, Mataró; Referees: Baños Martínez, Godoy Mena
May 17; 12:45 (UTC+2)	Report	Gibson 3	Goals	Recio 3	Piscina Joan Serra, Mataró; Referees: Baños Martínez, Godoy Mena

Mataró La Sirena won series 2–0 and advanced to Final

=== Final ===
==== 1st leg ====
May 21; 17:30 (UTC+2)	Report	Mataró La Sirena	6–10	Sabadell Astralpool	Piscina Joan Serra, Mataró; Referees: Verdejo Domingo, Sanfeliu Cobo
May 21; 17:30 (UTC+2)	Report	Score by quarters: 2–1, 2–4, 2–3, 0–2			Piscina Joan Serra, Mataró; Referees: Verdejo Domingo, Sanfeliu Cobo
May 21; 17:30 (UTC+2)	Report	Wilcox, Gibson-Byrne 2	Goals	three players 2	Piscina Joan Serra, Mataró; Referees: Verdejo Domingo, Sanfeliu Cobo

==== 2nd leg ====
May 24; 11:30 (UTC+2)	Report	Sabadell Astralpool	11–7	Mataró La Sirena	Piscinas Carles Ibars, Sabadell; Referees: Blanch Sánchez, Caner Espinosa
May 24; 11:30 (UTC+2)	Report	Score by quarters: 4–2, 2–4, 2–0, 1–1			Piscinas Carles Ibars, Sabadell; Referees: Blanch Sánchez, Caner Espinosa
May 24; 11:30 (UTC+2)	Report	Szücs 3	Goals	Chillida 3	Piscinas Carles Ibars, Sabadell; Referees: Blanch Sánchez, Caner Espinosa

Sabadell Astralpool won the Championship Finals series 2–0.

2013–14 División de Honor Femenina winners
(Catalonia)
Sabadell Astralpool
Twelfth title

==== Individual awards ====
- Championship MVP: (Spain) Maica García, CN Sabadell Astralpool
- Best Goalkeeper: (Spain) Laura Ester, CN Sabadell Astralpool
- Top goalscorer: (Spain) Helena Lloret, CN Sabadell Astralpool

== Relegation playoff ==
Playoff to be played in two legs. First leg to be played on 10 May and 2nd leg on 17 May. The winner will play in División de Honor Femenina 2014–15 and the loser one in Primera División.

Team 1	Agg.	Team 2	1st leg	2nd leg
La Latina (Community of Madrid)	16–16 (3–4 p)	(Community of Madrid) Concepción–Cdad Lineal	7–8	9–8

=== 1st leg ===
May 10; 18:00 (UTC+2)	Report	Concepción–Cdad Lineal	7–8	La Latina	Piscina CMD Concepción, Madrid; Referees: Baños Martínez, Cáceres Pérez
May 10; 18:00 (UTC+2)	Report	Score by quarters: 2–1, 0–2, 4–3, 1–2			Piscina CMD Concepción, Madrid; Referees: Baños Martínez, Cáceres Pérez
May 10; 18:00 (UTC+2)	Report	Migueláñez 2	Goals	three players 2	Piscina CMD Concepción, Madrid; Referees: Baños Martínez, Cáceres Pérez

=== 2nd leg ===
May 17; 17:00 (UTC+2)	Report	La Latina	8–9	Concepción–Cdad Lineal	Piscina M-86, Madrid; Referees: Jiménez Turnes, Cerezo Crespo
May 17; 17:00 (UTC+2)	Report	Score by quarters: 1–2, 2–4, 2–0, 3–3			Piscina M-86, Madrid; Referees: Jiménez Turnes, Cerezo Crespo
May 17; 17:00 (UTC+2)	Report	López-Escribano 3	Goals	Marbán 3	Piscina M-86, Madrid; Referees: Jiménez Turnes, Cerezo Crespo

16–16 on aggregate. Concepción–Cdad Lineal won the penalty shoot-out 4–3 and promoted to División de Honor.

== Top goal scorers ==
(regular season only)

Player	Goals	Team
(Spain) Helena Lloret	85	CN Sant Andreu
(Spain) Maica García	83	CN Sabadell Astralpool
(Spain) Beatriz Ortiz	77	CN Rubí
(Spain) Jennifer Pareja	68	CN Sabadell Astralpool
(Spain) Andrea Blas	67	EW Zaragoza
(Spain) Gemma Pané	66	CN Terrassa
(Spain) Judith Forca	66	CN Sabadell Astralpool
(Spain) Marta Recio	58	CN Sant Andreu
(Spain) Laura Vicente	53	CE Mediterrani
(Spain) Amanda Triviño	50	CN Rubí

== See also ==
- División de Honor de Waterpolo 2013–14
