= 2014–15 División de Honor Femenina de Waterpolo =

División de Honor Femenina 2014–15
- League: División de Honor
- Sport: women's water polo
- Duration: October 11, 2014–April 29, 2015 (regular season); May 6 – May 16 (championship playoff)
- Teams: 10
- League champions: Sabadell Astralpool
- Runners-up: Sant Andreu
- Top scorer: Maica García, 67 goals
- Relegated to Primera División: AR Concepción-Cdad. Lineal

División de Honor seasons
- ← 2013–14 2015–16 →

The 2014–15 is the 28th season of División de Honor, the top flight women's water polo in Spain since its inception in 1988.

The season comprises regular season and championship playoff. Regular season started on October 11, 2014 and finished on April 29, 2015. After the regular season, top four teams at standings play championship playoff.

Championship playoff began on May 6 with semifinals to best of three games, with two winners advancing to the Final.

Sabadell Astralpool won its fifth championship title in a row after defeating CN Sant Andreu in the Championship Final series 2–0.

== Teams ==
División de Honor de Waterpolo Femenino 2014–15 teams

Team	City/Area	Founded	Pool	website
Sabadell Astralpool	Sabadell	1916	Can Llong	
Mataró La Sirena	Mataró	1932	Joan Serra	
Sant Andreu	Barcelona	1971	Pere Serrat	
Mediterrani	Barcelona	1931	Josep Vallès	
Rubí	Rubí	1971	Can Rosés	
Terrassa	Terrassa	1932	Àrea Olímpica	
Madrid Moscardó	Madrid	1958	Piscina CDM Moscardó	
Zaragoza	Zaragoza	1984	Piscina Stadium Casablanca	
Dos Hermanas	Dos Hermanas	1993	Piscina CMAD Montequinto	
Concepción–Cdad Lineal	Madrid	1969	Piscina CMD Concepción	

== Regular season standings ==
Pos	Team	Pld	W	D	L	GF	GA	GD	Pts	Qualification or relegation
1	Sabadell Astralpool	18	18	0	0	378	93	+285	54	Qualification to championship playoffs
2	Mataró La Sirena	18	14	2	2	234	139	+95	44	Qualification to championship playoffs
3	Sant Andreu	18	11	4	3	191	159	+32	37	Qualification to championship playoffs
4	Mediterrani	18	11	2	5	190	143	+47	35	Qualification to championship playoffs
5	Madrid Moscardó	18	8	2	8	156	193	−37	26	
6	Terrassa	18	7	1	10	151	176	−25	22	
7	Rubí	18	6	1	11	156	199	−43	19	
8	Dos Hermanas	18	4	0	14	151	218	−67	12	
9	Zaragoza	18	3	1	14	124	234	−110	10	Qualification to relegation playoff
10	Concepción–Cdad Lineal	18	1	1	16	107	284	−177	4	Relegation to Primera División

Updated to match(es) played on 6 May 2015. Source: División de Honor Femenina table and rfen.es
Rules for classification: 1) points; 2) head-to-head points; 3) head-to-head goal difference; 4) goal difference; 5) number of goals scored

== Championship playoffs ==
Semifinals (best of 3)
1	Sabadell Astralpool	16	16
4	Mediterrani	6	8
2	Mataró La Sirena	10	7	3
3	Sant Andreu	4	8	11

Final (best of 3)
1	Sabadell Astralpool	14	11
3	Sant Andreu	5	5

=== Semifinals ===
==== 1st match ====
May 6; 20:30 (UTC+2)	Report	Mediterrani	6–16	Sabadell Astralpool	Piscina Josep Vallès, Barcelona; Referees: Ortega Pacheco, Ruiz Jiménez
May 6; 20:30 (UTC+2)	Report	Score by quarters: 1–3, 1–3, 2–5, 2–5			Piscina Josep Vallès, Barcelona; Referees: Ortega Pacheco, Ruiz Jiménez
May 6; 20:30 (UTC+2)	Report	Gorría 3	Goals	Peña 5	Piscina Josep Vallès, Barcelona; Referees: Ortega Pacheco, Ruiz Jiménez

May 6; 20:45 (UTC+2)	Report	Sant Andreu	4–10	Mataró La Sirena	Piscina Pere Serrat, Barcelona; Referees: Sánchez Martín, López de la Vega
May 6; 20:45 (UTC+2)	Report	Score by quarters: 1–3, 0–3, 1–3, 2–1			Piscina Pere Serrat, Barcelona; Referees: Sánchez Martín, López de la Vega
May 6; 20:45 (UTC+2)	Report	four players 1	Goals	Gragnolati 3	Piscina Pere Serrat, Barcelona; Referees: Sánchez Martín, López de la Vega

==== 2nd match ====
May 9; 11:00 (UTC+2)	Report	Sabadell Astralpool	16–8	Mediterrani	Piscines Carles Ibars, Sabadell; Referees: Domínguez Rivero, Súarez Medina
May 9; 11:00 (UTC+2)	Report	Score by quarters: 5–1, 3–4, 3–0, 5–3			Piscines Carles Ibars, Sabadell; Referees: Domínguez Rivero, Súarez Medina
May 9; 11:00 (UTC+2)	Report	M García 5	Goals	three players 2	Piscines Carles Ibars, Sabadell; Referees: Domínguez Rivero, Súarez Medina

Sabadell Astralpool wins series 2–0.

May 9; 12:45 (UTC+2)	Report	Mataró La Sirena	7–8	Sant Andreu	Piscina Joan Serra, Mataró; Referees: Baños Martínez, Segurana Ferré
May 9; 12:45 (UTC+2)	Report	Score by quarters: 0–1, 4–3, 2–0, 1–4			Piscina Joan Serra, Mataró; Referees: Baños Martínez, Segurana Ferré
May 9; 12:45 (UTC+2)	Report	three players 2	Goals	three players 2	Piscina Joan Serra, Mataró; Referees: Baños Martínez, Segurana Ferré

==== 3rd match ====
May 10; 12:45 (UTC+2)	Report	Mataró La Sirena	3–11	Sant Andreu	Piscina Joan Serra, Mataró; Referees: Muntané Llavería
May 10; 12:45 (UTC+2)	Report	Score by quarters: 0–4, 2–2, 1–3, 0–2			Piscina Joan Serra, Mataró; Referees: Muntané Llavería
May 10; 12:45 (UTC+2)	Report	L López 2	Goals	Lloret, Recio 3	Piscina Joan Serra, Mataró; Referees: Muntané Llavería

Sant Andreu wins series 2–1.

=== Final ===
==== 1st match ====
May 13; 20:45 (UTC+2)	Report	Sant Andreu	5–14	Sabadell Astralpool	Piscina Pere Serrat, Barcelona; Referees: Sánchez Martín, Domínguez Rivero
May 13; 20:45 (UTC+2)	Report	Score by quarters: 0–4, 3–2, 1–3, 1–5			Piscina Pere Serrat, Barcelona; Referees: Sánchez Martín, Domínguez Rivero
May 13; 20:45 (UTC+2)	Report	Lloret 2	Goals	M García 4	Piscina Pere Serrat, Barcelona; Referees: Sánchez Martín, Domínguez Rivero

==== 2nd match ====
May 16; 12:00 (UTC+2)	Report	Sabadell Astralpool	11–5	Sant Andreu	Piscines Carles Ibars, Sabadell; Referees: Baños Martínez, Muntané Llavería
May 16; 12:00 (UTC+2)	Report	Score by quarters: 3–1, 4–1, 3–3, 1–0			Piscines Carles Ibars, Sabadell; Referees: Baños Martínez, Muntané Llavería
May 16; 12:00 (UTC+2)	Report	Pareja 5	Goals	five players 1	Piscines Carles Ibars, Sabadell; Referees: Baños Martínez, Muntané Llavería

Sabadell Astralpool wins championship Final series 2–0.

2014–15 División de Honor Femenina winners
(Catalonia)
Sabadell Astralpool
Thirteenth title

==== Individual awards ====
- Championship MVP: (Spain) Maica García, CN Sabadell Astralpool
- Best Goalkeeper: (Spain) Laura Ester, CN Sabadell Astralpool
- Top goalscorer: (Spain) Maica García, CN Sabadell Astralpool

== Relegation playoff ==
Playoff to be played in two legs. First leg to be played on 9 May and 2nd leg on 16 May. The winner will play in División de Honor Femenina 2015–16 and the loser one in Primera División.

Team 1	Agg.	Team 2	1st leg	2nd leg
Zaragoza (Aragon)	20–16	(Catalonia) Sant Feliu	10–7	10–9

=== 1st match ===
May 9; 19:30 (UTC+2)	Report	Sant Feliu	7–10	Zaragoza	Complex Municipal de Piscines, Sant Feliu; Referees: Gómez Pordomingo, Sanfeliu Cobo
May 9; 19:30 (UTC+2)	Report	Score by quarters: 2–2, 1–3, 2–3, 2–2			Complex Municipal de Piscines, Sant Feliu; Referees: Gómez Pordomingo, Sanfeliu Cobo
May 9; 19:30 (UTC+2)	Report	Dalmases 2	Goals	Blas, Tazueco 4	Complex Municipal de Piscines, Sant Feliu; Referees: Gómez Pordomingo, Sanfeliu Cobo

=== 2nd match ===
May 16; 18:00 (UTC+2)	Report	Zaragoza	10–9	Sant Feliu	Piscina Parque de Bomberos, Zaragoza; Referees: Ortega Pacheco, Campos Rodríguez
May 16; 18:00 (UTC+2)	Report	Score by quarters: 3–3, 3–2, 4–2, 0–2			Piscina Parque de Bomberos, Zaragoza; Referees: Ortega Pacheco, Campos Rodríguez
May 16; 18:00 (UTC+2)	Report	Blas, Tazueco 3	Goals	Dalmases 4	Piscina Parque de Bomberos, Zaragoza; Referees: Ortega Pacheco, Campos Rodríguez

EW Zaragoza wins 20–16 on aggregate and remained in División de Honor.

== Top goalscorers ==
(regular season only)

Rank	Player	Goals	Team
1	(Spain) Maica García	67	CN Sabadell Astralpool
2	(Spain) Judith Forca	57	CN Sabadell Astralpool
3	(Spain) Beatriz Ortiz	55	CN Rubí
4	(Spain) Helena Lloret	51	CN Sant Andreu
5	(Spain) Gemma Pané	47	CN Terrassa
5	(Spain) Laura Vicente	47	CE Mediterrani
7	(Spain) Anni Espar	45	CN Sabadell Astralpool
8	(United Kingdom) Ciara Gibson-Byrne	42	CN Mataró La Sirena
8	(Spain) Olga Domenech	42	CN Sabadell Astralpool
10	(Spain) Jennifer Pareja	41	CN Sabadell Astralpool
10	(Spain) Lorena Miranda	41	CW Dos Hermanas

== See also ==
- División de Honor de Waterpolo 2014–15
