= 2012–13 División de Honor Femenina de Waterpolo =

Women's water polo season

División de Honor Femenina 2012–13
- League: División de Honor
- Sport: women's water polo
- Duration: October 2012–May 11, 2013 (regular season); May 15–May 25 (championship playoff)
- Teams: 12
- League champions: Sabadell Astralpool
- Runners-up: Mataró El Tot
- Top scorer: Jennifer Pareja, 126 goals
- Relegated to Primera División: Concepción–Cdad Lineal & Sant Feliu

División de Honor seasons
- ← 2011–12 2013–14 →

The 2012–13 was the 26th season of División de Honor, the top flight women's water polo in Spain.

The season comprises regular season and championship playoff. The regular season started in October 2012 and finished on May 11, 2013. Upon completion regular season, top four teams played in the championship playoff.

The championship playoff began a week later with semifinals, and the final was played in late May.

Sabadell Astralpool was the defending champion and successfully defended its title of the previous season after defeating CN Mataró El Tot 2–0 in the championship final.

== Teams ==
División de Honor Femenina de Waterpolo 2012–13 teams

Team	City/Area	Founded	Pool	website
Sabadell Astrapool	Sabadell	1916	Can Llong	
Mediterrani	Barcelona	1931	Josep Vallès	
Mataró El Tot	Mataró	1932	Joan Serra	
Madrid Moscardó	Madrid	1958	Piscina CDM Moscardó	
Sant Andreu	Barcelona	1971	Pere Serrat	
Zaragoza	Zaragoza	1984	Piscina Stadium Casablanca	
Terrassa	Terrassa	1932	Àrea Olímpica	
Dos Hermanas Emasesa	Dos Hermanas	1993	Piscina CMAD Montequinto	
La Latina	Madrid	1969	Piscina M-86	
WP 98 02	Pamplona	1998	Piscina UPNA	
Concepción–Cdad Lineal	Madrid	1969	Piscina CDM Concepción	
Sant Feliu	Sant Feliu de Llobregat	1969	Complex Municipal de Piscines	

== Regular season standings ==
	Team	P	W	D	L	GF	GA	GD	Pts
1	Sabadell Astralpool	22	22	0	0	509	101	408	66
2	Mataró El Tot	22	18	2	2	339	137	202	56
3	Madrid Moscardó	22	15	3	4	216	191	25	48
4	Mediterrani	22	14	4	4	269	176	93	46
5	Sant Andreu	22	13	1	8	225	211	14	40
6	Zaragoza	22	11	3	8	228	261	−33	36
7	Dos Hermanas Emasesa	22	8	0	14	172	253	−81	24
8	Terrassa	22	8	0	14	210	269	−59	24
9	La Latina	22	8	0	14	180	251	−71	24
10	WP 98 02	22	3	2	17	181	347	−166	11
11	Concepción–Cdad Lineal	22	2	0	20	131	313	−182	6
12	Sant Feliu	22	1	3	18	179	329	−150	6

Championship playoffs
Relegated

== Championship playoffs ==
Semifinals (best of 3)
1	Sabadell Astralpool	18	18
4	Mediterrani	9	9
2	Mataró El Tot	9	11
3	Madrid Moscardó	6	3

Final (best of 3)
1	Sabadell Astralpool	10	12
2	Mataró El Tot	9	7

=== Semifinals ===
==== 1st leg ====
May 15; 17:00 (UTC+2)	Report	Madrid Moscardó	6–9	Mataró El Tot	Piscina CDM Moscardó, Madrid; Referees: Felicidad Rodríguez, García Tardón
May 15; 17:00 (UTC+2)	Report	Score by quarters: 1–2, 4–4, 0–3, 1–0			Piscina CDM Moscardó, Madrid; Referees: Felicidad Rodríguez, García Tardón
May 15; 17:00 (UTC+2)	Report	Abad 2	Goals	Tarragó, Gibson-Byrne 2	Piscina CDM Moscardó, Madrid; Referees: Felicidad Rodríguez, García Tardón

May 15; 20:45 (UTC+2)	Report	Mediterrani	9–18	Sabadell Astralpool	Instal.lació Josep Vallès, Barcelona; Referees: Trojan Bučić, Massegú Arnau
May 15; 20:45 (UTC+2)	Report	Score by quarters: 3–5, 1–5, 2–2, 3–6			Instal.lació Josep Vallès, Barcelona; Referees: Trojan Bučić, Massegú Arnau
May 15; 20:45 (UTC+2)	Report	Toha 4	Goals	Pareja 7	Instal.lació Josep Vallès, Barcelona; Referees: Trojan Bučić, Massegú Arnau

==== 2nd leg ====
May 18; 11:00 (UTC+2)	Report	Sabadell Astralpool	18–9	Mediterrani	Piscina Can Llong, Sabadell; Referees: Santander López, Fuentes Flores
May 18; 11:00 (UTC+2)	Report	Score by quarters: 5–1, 5–2, 5–1, 3–5			Piscina Can Llong, Sabadell; Referees: Santander López, Fuentes Flores
May 18; 11:00 (UTC+2)	Report	Maica 9	Goals	Espar 5	Piscina Can Llong, Sabadell; Referees: Santander López, Fuentes Flores

Sabadell Astralpool won series 2–0 and advanced to Semifinals

May 18; 12:45 (UTC+2)	Report	Mataró El Tot	11–3	Madrid Moscardó	Piscina Joan Serra, Mataró; Referees: Guardia Marsal, Caner Espinosa
May 18; 12:45 (UTC+2)	Report	Score by quarters: 2–1, 4–0, 1–1, 4–1			Piscina Joan Serra, Mataró; Referees: Guardia Marsal, Caner Espinosa
May 18; 12:45 (UTC+2)	Report	Llisterri 4	Goals	A. González 2	Piscina Joan Serra, Mataró; Referees: Guardia Marsal, Caner Espinosa

Mataró El Tot won series 2–0 and advanced to Semifinals

=== Final ===
==== 1st leg ====
May 23; 18:30 (UTC+2)	Report	Mataró El Tot	9–10	Sabadell Astralpool	Piscina Joan Serra, Mataró; Referees: Sánchez Molina, Aymerich Miñarro
May 23; 18:30 (UTC+2)	Report	Score by quarters: 4–3, 2–4, 2–1, 1–2			Piscina Joan Serra, Mataró; Referees: Sánchez Molina, Aymerich Miñarro
May 23; 18:30 (UTC+2)	Report	Gibson-Byrne 3	Goals	Pareja 4	Piscina Joan Serra, Mataró; Referees: Sánchez Molina, Aymerich Miñarro

==== 2nd leg ====
May 25; 11:00 (UTC+2)	Report	Sabadell Astralpool	12–7	Mataró El Tot	Piscinas Carles Ibars, Sabadell; Referees: Baños Martínez, Blanch Sánchez
May 25; 11:00 (UTC+2)	Report	Score by quarters: 3–1, 3–2, 1–1, 5–3			Piscinas Carles Ibars, Sabadell; Referees: Baños Martínez, Blanch Sánchez
May 25; 11:00 (UTC+2)	Report	Pareja 4	Goals	Tarragó 3	Piscinas Carles Ibars, Sabadell; Referees: Baños Martínez, Blanch Sánchez

Sabadell Astralpool won Championship final series 2–0.

2012–13 División de Honor Femenina winners
(Catalonia)
Sabadell Astralpool
eleventh title

==== Individual awards ====
- Championship MVP: (Spain) Maica García, CN Sabadell Astralpool
- Best Goalkeeper: (Spain) Laura Ester, CN Sabadell Astralpool
- Top goalscorer: (Spain) Jennifer Pareja, CN Sabadell Astralpool

== Top goal scorers ==
(regular season only)

Player	Goals	Team
(Spain) Clara Espar	110	CN Mediterrani
(Spain) Jennifer Pareja	109	CN Sabadell Astralpool
(Spain) Ona Meseguer	78	CN Sant Andreu
(Spain) Gemma Pané	77	CN Terrassa
(Spain) Maica García	72	CN Sabadell Astralpool
(Spain) Roser Tarragó	71	CN Mataró El Tot
(Spain) Andrea Blas	68	EW Zaragoza
(Spain) Judith Forca	60	CN Sabadell Astralpool
(Spain) Gemma Casasayas	59	CN Sant Andreu
(Spain) Laura López	57	CN Madrid Moscardó

== See also ==
- División de Honor de Waterpolo 2012–13
