= 2011–12 División de Honor Femenina de Waterpolo =

The 2011–12 División de Honor Femenina de Waterpolo was the 25th edition of the Spanish premier women's water polo championship. Defending champion CN Sabadell won all 22 games to win its tenth title.

== Teams by autonomous community ==
Location of teams in 2012–13 División de Honor Femenina de Waterpolo

Autonomous community	Teams
Catalonia	6: Mataró El Tot, Mediterrani, Sabadell Airpool, Sant Andreu, Sant Feliu, Terrassa
(Community of Madrid) Madrid	3: Concepción, La Latina Covíbar, Moscardó
Andalusia	1: Dos Hermanas Emasesa
Aragon	1: Escuela Zaragoza
Navarre	1: Universidad Navarra 9802

== Table ==
Pos	Team	Pld	W	D	L	GF	GF	Pts	PS	Q/R
1	Sabadell Airpool	22	22	0	0	445	118	66	Same position	Champions' Cup
2	Mataró El Tot	22	19	0	3	292	135	57	Same position	Champions' Cup
3	Sant Andreu	22	16	2	4	271	150	50	Same position	
4	Dos Hermanas Emasesa	22	13	1	8	183	212	40	▲3	LEN Trophy
5	Escuela Zaragoza	22	11	2	9	205	243	35	▼1	
6	Mediterrani	22	10	4	8	230	209	34	Same position	
7	Madrid Moscardó	22	11	1	10	237	241	34	▲1	
8	Terrassa	22	7	4	11	200	243	25	▲1	
9	Universidad Navarra 9802	22	8	1	13	198	268	25	New entry	
10	Sant Feliu	22	4	1	17	165	300	13	New entry	
11	La Latina	22	1	1	20	142	307	4	▼6	
12	Concepción	22	1	1	20	162	304	4	▼1	

== Results ==
	SAB	MAT	SAN	DOS	ZAR	MED	MOS	TER	UNA	SFE	LAT	CON
Sabadell Airpool		12–9	11–9	25–7	19–6	20–7	19–4	22–5	27–3	23–4	37–2	17–1
Mataró	8–14		5–8	11–2	18–6	13–7	16–2	16–5	17–7	19–6	18–4	16–7
Sant Andreu	6–13	4–6		11–5	15–5	13–9	15–5	14–3	14–6	20–4	12–6	22–6
Dos Hermanas Emasesa	3–21	4–12	8–16		9–4	8–4	10–9	9–8	10–6	9–4	11–6	12–6
Escuela Zaragoza	5–20	3–15	5–8	7–10		12–12	10–8	17–13	16–8	12–8	10–9	12–5
Mediterrani	8–20	5–8	7–6	8–8	9–10		11–11	14–12	12–7	16–2	13–3	19–4
Moscardó	8–17	7–12	6–10	10–12	17–8	11–16		16–11	14–6	17–9	13–8	12–10
Terrassa	3–15	8–12	10–10	7–5	8–8	12–12	8–10		14–9	7–11	12–8	9–7
Universidad Navarra 9802	7–21	7–18	14–14	13–9	10–11	9–7	10–12	6–11		15–12	15–7	15–13
Sant Feliu	6–21	4–12	6–14	11–12	7–14	7–13	3–18	9–13	4–7		12–10	16–10
La Latina	2–29	5–14	4–17	8–12	7–13	8–9	10–13	5–13	0–5	7–7		14–7
Concepción	5–22	8–17	6–13	5–8	8–11	5–21	10–14	8–8	5–13	11–13	15–9	

== Top scorers ==
Scorer	Team	Goals
(Spain) Roser Tarragó	Mataró El Tot	115
(Spain) Jennifer Pareja	Sabadell Airpool	95
(Spain) Clara Espar	Mediterrani	77
(Spain) Teresa Gorría	Sant Andreu	75
(Spain) Laura López	Moscardó	74
