= 2015–16 División de Honor de Waterpolo =

División de Honor 2015–16
- League: División de Honor
- Sport: Water polo
- Duration: October 3, 2015–April 23, 2016 (regular season); May 3– (championship playoff)
- Number of teams: 12
- League champions: Atlètic-Barceloneta
- Runners-up: AstralPool Sabadell
- Top scorer: (Netherlands) Robin Lindhout, 65 goals
- Relegated to 1ª División: CN Sant Feliu

División de Honor seasons
- ← 2014–15 2016–17 →

The 2015–16 season of the División de Honor de Waterpolo was the 93rd season of top-tier water polo in Spain since its inception in 1925. Twelve teams competed for this season.

The season comprises regular season and championship playoff. The regular season started in October 2015 and finished on April 23, 2016. Top eight teams at standings when finishing regular season play the championship playoff.

The championship playoff started on 3/4 May with the quarter-finals series. Quarter finals, semifinals and Final are played to the best of 3 matches.

Atlètic-Barceloneta won its eleventh title in a row and sixteenth overall after defeating AstralPool Sabadell in the Championship Final series 2–1.

== Competition ==
=== Format ===
The División de Honor season took place between October and May, with every team playing each other at home and away for a total of 22 matches. Points were awarded according to the following:

- 3 points for a win
- 1 point for a draw

Top eight teams when finishing regular season play championship playoff. Bottom team is relegated while team qualified 11th play relegation playoff.

=== Promotion and relegation ===
Bottom team at standings when finishing regular season is relegated to Primera División, while the champion team from Primera División is promoted.

== Team information ==
Catalan teams in División de Honor 2015–16 teams
Remaining teams in División de Honor 2015–16 teams

Team	City/Area	Founded	Stadium	website
Atlètic-Barceloneta	Barcelona	1913 (1992)	Piscina Sant Sebastià	
Mediterrani	Barcelona	1931	Instal·lació Josep Vallès	
Sabadell	Sabadell	1916	Can Llong	
Mataró Quadis	Mataró	1932	Piscina Joan Serra	
Terrassa	Terrassa	1932	Àrea Olímpica	
Real Canoe–Isostar	Madrid	1931	Piscina Real Canoe	
Barcelona	Barcelona	1907	Nova Escullera	
Catalunya	Barcelona	1931	Piscina Sant Jordi	
Sant Andreu	Barcelona	1971	Piscina Pere Serrat	
Waterpolo Navarra	Pamplona	2006	Ciudad Deportiva Amaya	
Rubí	Rubí	1971	Piscina Can Rosés	
Sant Feliu	Sant Feliu de Llobregat	1969	Piscina CN Molins de Rei	

== Regular season standings ==
Pos	Team	Pld	W	D	L	GF	GA	GD	Pts	Qualification or relegation
1	Atlètic-Barceloneta	22	21	1	0	282	121	+161	64	Qualification to championship playoffs
2	AstralPool Sabadell	22	18	1	3	275	164	+111	55	Qualification to championship playoffs
3	Real Canoe–Isostar	22	14	1	7	206	182	+24	43	Qualification to championship playoffs
4	Terrassa	22	13	3	6	215	158	+57	42	Qualification to championship playoffs
5	Quadis Mataró	22	12	4	6	229	178	+51	40	Qualification to championship playoffs
6	Barcelona	22	12	1	9	202	202	0	37	Qualification to championship playoffs
7	Sant Andreu	22	9	1	12	197	185	+12	28	Qualification to championship playoffs
8	Mediterrani	22	9	1	12	189	195	−6	28	Qualification to championship playoffs
9	Catalunya	22	7	2	13	177	227	−50	23	
10	Waterpolo Navarra	22	6	1	15	158	235	−77	19	
11	Rubí	22	2	2	18	147	251	−104	8	Qualification to relegation playoff
12	Sant Feliu	22	0	0	22	109	288	−179	0	Relegation to Primera División

Updated to match(es) played on 29 April 2016. Source: División de Honor table and rfen.es
Rules for classification: 1) points; 2) head-to-head points; 3) head-to-head goal difference; 4) goal difference; 5) number of goals scored

== Championship playoffs ==
=== Bracket ===
Quarter-finals (best of 3)
1	Atlètic-Barceloneta	16	11
8	Mediterrani	2	3
4	Terrassa	5	6
5	Quadis Mataró	4	5
2	AstralPool Sabadell	15	15
7	Sant Andreu	10	7
3	Real Canoe–Isostar	7	13	8
6	Barcelona	11	12	12

Semi-finals (best of 3)
1	Atlètic-Barceloneta	13	10
4	Terrassa	6	6
2	AstralPool Sabadell	8	10	12
6	Barcelona	10	9	9

Final (best of 3)
1	Atlètic-Barceloneta	6	9	11
2	AstralPool Sabadell	8	6	8

=== Quarter-finals ===
==== 1st match ====
May 3; 20:45 (UTC+2)	Boxscore	Atlètic-Barceloneta	16–2	Mediterrani	Piscina Sant Sebastià, Barcelona; Referees: Jaumandreu Sellarès, Teixidó Bermúdez
May 3; 20:45 (UTC+2)	Boxscore	Score by quarters: 3–0, 5–0, 3–1, 5–1			Piscina Sant Sebastià, Barcelona; Referees: Jaumandreu Sellarès, Teixidó Bermúdez
May 3; 20:45 (UTC+2)	Boxscore	Español 4	Goals	Idárraga 2	Piscina Sant Sebastià, Barcelona; Referees: Jaumandreu Sellarès, Teixidó Bermúdez

May 3; 20:45 (UTC+2)	Boxscore	Terrassa	5–4	Quadis Mataró	Piscina Àrea Olímpica, Terrassa; Referees: Buch Juanola, Iñesta Peralta
May 3; 20:45 (UTC+2)	Boxscore	Score by quarters: 0–1, 4–0, 1–2, 0–1			Piscina Àrea Olímpica, Terrassa; Referees: Buch Juanola, Iñesta Peralta
May 3; 20:45 (UTC+2)	Boxscore	five players 1	Goals	Barbena, Merino 2	Piscina Àrea Olímpica, Terrassa; Referees: Buch Juanola, Iñesta Peralta

May 4; 13:30 (UTC+2)	Boxscore	Real Canoe–Isostar	7–11	Barcelona	Centro de Natación Mundial 86, Madrid; Referees: Teixidó Bermúdez, Cerezo Crespo
May 4; 13:30 (UTC+2)	Boxscore	Score by quarters: 1–4, 2–2, 2–2, 2–3			Centro de Natación Mundial 86, Madrid; Referees: Teixidó Bermúdez, Cerezo Crespo
May 4; 13:30 (UTC+2)	Boxscore	V Gutiérrez 3	Goals	Esteller 3	Centro de Natación Mundial 86, Madrid; Referees: Teixidó Bermúdez, Cerezo Crespo

May 4; 20:45 (UTC+2)	Boxscore	AstralPool Sabadell	15–10	Sant Andreu	Piscines Carles Ibars, Sabadell; Referees: Torres Pérez, Guardia Marsal
May 4; 20:45 (UTC+2)	Boxscore	Score by quarters: 5–0, 3–4, 2–5, 5–1			Piscines Carles Ibars, Sabadell; Referees: Torres Pérez, Guardia Marsal
May 4; 20:45 (UTC+2)	Boxscore	three players 3	Goals	Brúder 6	Piscines Carles Ibars, Sabadell; Referees: Torres Pérez, Guardia Marsal

==== 2nd match ====
May 5; 18:00 (UTC+2)	Boxscore	Quadis Mataró	5–6	Terrassa	Piscina Joan Serra, Mataró; Referees: Teule Barreda, Ortega Carreras
May 5; 18:00 (UTC+2)	Boxscore	Score by quarters: 2–2, 3–1, 0–2, 0–1			Piscina Joan Serra, Mataró; Referees: Teule Barreda, Ortega Carreras
May 5; 18:00 (UTC+2)	Boxscore	Corbalán 2	Goals	Granados 2	Piscina Joan Serra, Mataró; Referees: Teule Barreda, Ortega Carreras

May 5; 20:45 (UTC+2)	Boxscore	Mediterrani	3–11	Atlètic-Barceloneta	Piscina Josep Vallès, Barcelona; Referees: Colominas Ezponda, Aymerich Miñarro
May 5; 20:45 (UTC+2)	Boxscore	Score by quarters: 0–2, 2–2, 1–3, 0–4			Piscina Josep Vallès, Barcelona; Referees: Colominas Ezponda, Aymerich Miñarro
May 5; 20:45 (UTC+2)	Boxscore	G García 2	Goals	three players 2	Piscina Josep Vallès, Barcelona; Referees: Colominas Ezponda, Aymerich Miñarro

May 6; 13:30 (UTC+2)	Boxscore	Barcelona	12–13	Real Canoe–Isostar	Piscina Nova Escullera, Barcelona; Referees: Jiménez Turnes, Ortega Pacheco
May 6; 13:30 (UTC+2)	Boxscore	Score by quarters: 2–4, 2–2, 1–2, 7–5			Piscina Nova Escullera, Barcelona; Referees: Jiménez Turnes, Ortega Pacheco
May 6; 13:30 (UTC+2)	Boxscore	Esteller 4	Goals	Barroso 4	Piscina Nova Escullera, Barcelona; Referees: Jiménez Turnes, Ortega Pacheco

May 6; 20:45 (UTC+2)	Boxscore	Sant Andreu	7–15	AstralPool Sabadell	Piscina Pere Serrat, Barcelona; Referees: Jiménez Turnes, Galindo Moreno
May 6; 20:45 (UTC+2)	Boxscore	Score by quarters: 3–6, 2–3, 1–3, 1–3			Piscina Pere Serrat, Barcelona; Referees: Jiménez Turnes, Galindo Moreno
May 6; 20:45 (UTC+2)	Boxscore	Brúder 2	Goals	Gallego 3	Piscina Pere Serrat, Barcelona; Referees: Jiménez Turnes, Galindo Moreno

==== 3rd match ====
May 8; 13:30 (UTC+2)	Boxscore	Real Canoe–Isostar	8–12	Barcelona	Centro de Natación Mundial 86, Madrid; Referees: Galindo Moreno, Felicidad Rodríguez
May 8; 13:30 (UTC+2)	Boxscore	Score by quarters: 1–3, 3–4, 1–4, 3–1			Centro de Natación Mundial 86, Madrid; Referees: Galindo Moreno, Felicidad Rodríguez
May 8; 13:30 (UTC+2)	Boxscore	Barroso 3	Goals	Ďurík 4	Centro de Natación Mundial 86, Madrid; Referees: Galindo Moreno, Felicidad Rodríguez

=== Semifinals ===
==== 1st match ====
May 12; 20:45 (UTC+2)	Boxscore	Atlètic-Barceloneta	13–6	Terrassa	Piscina Sant Sebastià, Barcelona; Referees: Buch Juanola, Ortega Pacheco
May 12; 20:45 (UTC+2)	Boxscore	Score by quarters: 2–2, 5–1, 4–2, 2–1			Piscina Sant Sebastià, Barcelona; Referees: Buch Juanola, Ortega Pacheco
May 12; 20:45 (UTC+2)	Boxscore	Rašović 4	Goals	Granados 2	Piscina Sant Sebastià, Barcelona; Referees: Buch Juanola, Ortega Pacheco

May 14; 12:45 (UTC+2)	Boxscore	AstralPool Sabadell	8–10	Barcelona	Piscines Carles Ibars, Sabadell; Referees: Teixidó Bermúdez, Colominas Ezponda
May 14; 12:45 (UTC+2)	Boxscore	Score by quarters: 2–2, 1–2, 3–3, 2–3			Piscines Carles Ibars, Sabadell; Referees: Teixidó Bermúdez, Colominas Ezponda
May 14; 12:45 (UTC+2)	Boxscore	three players 2	Goals	four players 2	Piscines Carles Ibars, Sabadell; Referees: Teixidó Bermúdez, Colominas Ezponda

==== 2nd match ====
May 15; 12:45 (UTC+2)	Boxscore	Terrassa	6–10	Atlètic-Barceloneta	Àrea Olímpica, Terrassa; Referees: Galindo Moreno, Iñesta Peralta
May 15; 12:45 (UTC+2)	Boxscore	Score by quarters: 1–2, 2–2, 2–2, 1–4			Àrea Olímpica, Terrassa; Referees: Galindo Moreno, Iñesta Peralta
May 15; 12:45 (UTC+2)	Boxscore	Granados, J Pérez 2	Goals	Rašović, Munarriz 3	Àrea Olímpica, Terrassa; Referees: Galindo Moreno, Iñesta Peralta

May 16; 12:45 (UTC+2)	Boxscore	Barcelona	9–10	AstralPool Sabadell	Nova Escullera, Barcelona; Referees: Buch Juanola, Teule Barreda
May 16; 12:45 (UTC+2)	Boxscore	Score by quarters: 1–4, 1–1, 3–4, 4–1			Nova Escullera, Barcelona; Referees: Buch Juanola, Teule Barreda
May 16; 12:45 (UTC+2)	Boxscore	nine players 1	Goals	López Escribano	Nova Escullera, Barcelona; Referees: Buch Juanola, Teule Barreda

==== 3rd match ====
May 22; 12:45 (UTC+2)	Boxscore	AstralPool Sabadell	12–9	Barcelona	Piscines Carles Ibars, Sabadell; Referees: Galindo Moreno, Teixidó Bermúdez
May 22; 12:45 (UTC+2)	Boxscore	Score by quarters: 3–2, 1–3, 4–1, 4–3			Piscines Carles Ibars, Sabadell; Referees: Galindo Moreno, Teixidó Bermúdez
May 22; 12:45 (UTC+2)	Boxscore	López Escribano 5	Goals	three players 2	Piscines Carles Ibars, Sabadell; Referees: Galindo Moreno, Teixidó Bermúdez

=== Final ===
==== 1st match ====
May 24; 20:45 (UTC+2)	Boxscore	Atlètic-Barceloneta	6–8	AstralPool Sabadell	Piscina Sant Sebastià, Barcelona; Referees: Buch Juanola, Colominas Ezponda
May 24; 20:45 (UTC+2)	Boxscore	Score by quarters: 2–2, 2–2, 2–2, 0–2			Piscina Sant Sebastià, Barcelona; Referees: Buch Juanola, Colominas Ezponda
May 24; 20:45 (UTC+2)	Boxscore	Munarriz 2	Goals	López Escribano 3	Piscina Sant Sebastià, Barcelona; Referees: Buch Juanola, Colominas Ezponda

==== 2nd match ====
May 26; 21:00 (UTC+2)	Boxscore	AstralPool Sabadell	6–9	Atlètic-Barceloneta	Piscines Carles Ibars, Sabadell; Referees: Galindo Moreno, Torres Pérez
May 26; 21:00 (UTC+2)	Boxscore	Score by quarters: 2–2, 1–4, 2–2, 1–1			Piscines Carles Ibars, Sabadell; Referees: Galindo Moreno, Torres Pérez
May 26; 21:00 (UTC+2)	Boxscore	Koopman, López Escribano 2	Goals	Minguell, Faměra 2	Piscines Carles Ibars, Sabadell; Referees: Galindo Moreno, Torres Pérez

==== 3rd match ====
May 30; 21:00 (UTC+2)	Boxscore	Atlètic-Barceloneta	11–8	AstralPool Sabadell	Piscina Sant Sebastià, Barcelona; Referees: Teixidó Bermúdez, Gómez Pordomingo
May 30; 21:00 (UTC+2)	Boxscore	Score by quarters: 1–5, 2–0, 5–2, 3–1			Piscina Sant Sebastià, Barcelona; Referees: Teixidó Bermúdez, Gómez Pordomingo
May 30; 21:00 (UTC+2)	Boxscore	Munarriz 4	Goals	Marsal 3	Piscina Sant Sebastià, Barcelona; Referees: Teixidó Bermúdez, Gómez Pordomingo

Atlètic-Barceloneta wins championship Final series 2–1.

2015–16 División de Honor winners
(Catalonia)
Atlètic-Barceloneta
Sixteenth title

==== Individual awards ====
- Championship MVP: (Spain) Alberto Munarriz, CN Atlètic-Barceloneta
- Best Goalkeeper: (Spain) Daniel López, CN Atlètic-Barceloneta
- Top goalscorer: (Netherlands) Robin Lindhout, CN Mataró

== Relegation playoff ==
Playoff to be played in two legs. 1st leg to be played on 7 May and 2nd leg on 14 May. The overall winner will play in División de Honor 2016–17 and the loser will play in Primera Nacional.

Team 1	Agg.	Team 2	1st leg	2nd leg
Rubí (Catalonia)	23–18	(Canary Islands) Acuasport Tenerife Echeyde	15–12	8–6

=== 1st leg ===
May 7; 17:45 (UTC+1)	Boxscore	Acuasport Tenerife Echeyde	12–15	Rubí	Piscina Quico Cabrera, Santa Cruz; Referees: Gómez Pordomingo, Torres Pérez
May 7; 17:45 (UTC+1)	Boxscore	Score by quarters: 2–2, 5–2, 3–5, 2–6			Piscina Quico Cabrera, Santa Cruz; Referees: Gómez Pordomingo, Torres Pérez
May 7; 17:45 (UTC+1)	Boxscore	Alcalá, Fernández-Caldas 4	Goals	Carrasco 4	Piscina Quico Cabrera, Santa Cruz; Referees: Gómez Pordomingo, Torres Pérez

=== 2nd leg ===
May 14; 20:45 (UTC+2)	Boxscore	Rubí	8–6	Acuasport Tenerife Echeyde	Piscina Can Rosés, Rubí; Referees: Jaumandreu Sellarès, Iñesta Peralta
May 14; 20:45 (UTC+2)	Boxscore	Score by quarters: 0–2, 1–1, 3–1, 4–2			Piscina Can Rosés, Rubí; Referees: Jaumandreu Sellarès, Iñesta Peralta
May 14; 20:45 (UTC+2)	Boxscore	Reuten 2	Goals	San Martín 3	Piscina Can Rosés, Rubí; Referees: Jaumandreu Sellarès, Iñesta Peralta

CN Rubí won 23–18 on aggregate and remained in División de Honor 2016–17.

== Season statistics ==
=== Top goalscorers ===
Rank	Player	Team	Goals
1	(Netherlands) Robin Lindhout	Quadis Mataró	64
2	(Spain) Alberto Barroso	Real Canoe–Isostar	58
3	(Spain) Víctor Gutiérrez	Real Canoe–Isostar	53
4	(Spain) Albert Español	Atlètic-Barceloneta	52
5	(Spain) Gonzalo López Escribano	AstralPool Sabadell	47
6	(Spain) Víctor Flores	Barcelona	45
7	(Argentina) Germán Yañez	Mediterrani	41
8	(Spain) Joel Esteller	Barcelona	40
9	(Slovakia) Lukáš Ďurík	Barcelona	39
9	(Serbia) Strahinja Rašović	Atlètic-Barceloneta	39

=== Number of teams by autonomous communities ===
	Autonomous Communities	No. teams	Teams
1	Catalonia	10	Barcelona, Barceloneta, Catalunya, Mataró, Mediterrani, Rubí, Sant Feliu, Sabadell, Sant Andreu and Terrassa
2	Madrid	1	Real Canoe
3	Navarre	1	Navarra

== See also ==
- 2015–16 División de Honor Femenina de Waterpolo
