= 2025–26 División de Honor Femenina de Waterpolo =

39th season of the Spanish women's water polo league

2025–26 División de Honor Femenina
Tournament details
- Country: Spain
- Teams: 12

Tournament statistics
- Matches played: 132

Official website
- Official website

The 2025–26 División de Honor Femenina is the 39th season of the top division women's water polo league in Spain since its establishment in 1988. It starts in October 2025 with the first round of the regular season and ends in May 2026. The league is organised by the Royal Spanish Swimming Federation.

Astralpool CN Sabadell are the defending champions.

== Format ==
Each team plays each other twice. The top four teams qualify for the play offs. The semifinals and final are played as a best of three series.

== Teams ==
Twelve clubs compete in the División de Honor Femenina during the 2025–26 season. CN Rubí are replaced by EU Horta, who won the second division.

Team	City	Position
Astralpool Sabadell	Sabadell	1st
Assolim CN Mataró	Mataró	4th
CD Waterpolo Iruña 9802	Pamplona	11th
CE Mediterrani	Barcelona	5th
CN Sant Andreu	Barcelona	2nd
CN Sant Feliu	Sant Feliu de Llobregat	8th
CN Terrassa	Terrassa	3rd
EPlus CN Catalunya	Barcelona	6th
EU Horta	Barcelona	1st in 2nd division
Real Canoe NC	Madrid	10th
Tenerife Echeyde	Santa Cruz de Tenerife	9th
Zodiac CNAB	Barcelona	7th

Location of teams in División de Honor Femenina (Spain)
Location of teams in 2025–26 División de Honor Femenina (Canary Islands)
Location of teams in División de Honor Femenina (Catalonia)

== Regular season ==
Pos	Team	Pld	W	PSW	PSL	L	GF	GA	GD	Pts	Qualification
1	Astralpool Sabadell	0	0	0	0	0	0	0	0	0	Semifinals
2	CN Sant Andreu	0	0	0	0	0	0	0	0	0	Semifinals
3	CN Terrassa	0	0	0	0	0	0	0	0	0	Semifinals
4	Assolim CN Mataró	0	0	0	0	0	0	0	0	0	Semifinals
5	CE Mediterrani	0	0	0	0	0	0	0	0	0	5–8 classification bracket
6	EPlus CN Catalunya	0	0	0	0	0	0	0	0	0	5–8 classification bracket
7	Zodiac CNAB	0	0	0	0	0	0	0	0	0	5–8 classification bracket
8	CN Sant Feliu	0	0	0	0	0	0	0	0	0	5–8 classification bracket
9	Tenerife Echeyde	0	0	0	0	0	0	0	0	0	Play Outs
10	Real Canoe NC	0	0	0	0	0	0	0	0	0	Play Outs
11	CD Waterpolo Iruña 9802	0	0	0	0	0	0	0	0	0	Play Outs
12	EU Horta	0	0	0	0	0	0	0	0	0	Play Outs

Source: División de Honor Femenina
Rules for classification: 1) Points; 2) Points difference; 3) Points scored.

== Results ==
Home \ Away	SAB	MAT	IRU	MED	SAN	FEL	TER	CAT	HOR	CAN	TEN	ZOD
Astralpool Sabadell	—	–	–	–	–	–	–	–	–	–	–	–
Assolim CN Mataró	–	—	–	–	–	–	–	–	–	–	–	–
CD Waterpolo Iruña 9802	–	–	—	–	–	–	–	–	–	–	–	–
CE Mediterrani	–	–	–	—	–	–	–	–	–	–	–	–
CN Sant Andreu	–	–	–	–	—	–	–	–	–	–	–	–
CN Sant Feliu	–	–	–	–	–	—	–	–	–	–	–	–
CN Terrassa	–	–	–	–	–	–	—	–	–	–	–	–
EPlus CN Catalunya	–	–	–	–	–	–	–	—	–	–	–	–
EU Horta	–	–	–	–	–	–	–	–	—	–	–	–
Real Canoe NC	–	–	–	–	–	–	–	–	–	—	–	–
Tenerife Echeyde	–	–	–	–	–	–	–	–	–	–	—	–
Zodiac CNAB	–	–	–	–	–	–	–	–	–	–	–	—

Updated to match(es) played on unknown. Source: División de Honor Femenina
Legend: Blue = home team win; Red = away team win.

== Play offs ==
Semifinals
1
4
2
3

Final

Champions of Spain

Team
title

== 5–8 classification bracket ==
5–8 semifinals
5
8
6
7

Fifth place

== Play outs ==
The losers of the play outs are relegated.

Relegation semifinals
9
12
10
11

Relegation final

== Final standings ==
Pos	Team	Pld	W	L	Qualification or relegation
1	Team	0	0	0	Qualification to Champions League group stage
2	Team	0	0	0	Qualification to Champions League group stage
3	Team	0	0	0	Qualification to Champions League qualification round
4	Team	0	0	0	Qualification to Champions League qualification round
5	Team	0	0	0	Qualification to Euro Cup group stage
6	Team	0	0	0	Qualification to Euro Cup qualification round
7	Team	0	0	0	Qualification to Conference Cup qualification round
8	Team	0	0	0	Qualification to Conference Cup qualification round
9	Team	0	0	0	Advance to Play Outs
10	Team	0	0	0	Advance to Play Outs
11	Team	0	0	0	Advance to Play Outs
12	Team	0	0	0	Advance to Play Outs

Updated to match(es) played on unknown. Source: División de Honor Femenina
