= 1989 Campeonato de España de Waterpolo Femenino =

Women's water polo championship

The 1989 Campeonato de España de waterpolo femenino was the second edition of RFEN's premier championship for women's water polo clubs. It took place from May 26 to June 11, 1989, and it was contested by twelve teams. CN Catalunya won all five games in the final stage to win its first title, while defending champion CN Molins de Rei was the runner-up.

== First stage ==
The following teams didn't qualify for the final stage:

(Community of Madrid) Alcorcón
(Aragon) El Olivar
(Community of Madrid) Las Encinas de Boadilla
(Community of Madrid) La Latina
(Canary Islands) Martiánez
(Community of Madrid) Ondarreta

== Final stage ==
| # | Team | Pld | W | D | L | GF | GA | Pt |
|---|---|---|---|---|---|---|---|---|
| 1 | (Catalonia) Catalunya | 5 | 5 | 0 | 0 | 47 | 14 | 10 |
| 2 | (Catalonia) Molins de Rei | 5 | 4 | 0 | 1 | 39 | 27 | 8 |
| 3 | (Catalonia) Sabadell | 5 | 2 | 0 | 3 | 31 | 34 | 4 |
| 4 | (Balearic Islands) Santa Eulàlia | 5 | 1 | 1 | 3 | 25 | 32 | 3 |
| 5 | (Catalonia) Montjuïc | 5 | 1 | 1 | 3 | 19 | 44 | 3 |
| 6 | (Catalonia) Mediterrani | 5 | 1 | 0 | 4 | 33 | 43 | 2 |

1989 Spain Women's Water Polo champions
(Catalonia) CN Catalunya
First title
