= Supercopa de España de Waterpolo Femenino =

Spanish women's water polo tournament

Supercopa de Waterpolo Femenino
- Sport: Women's water polo
- Founded: 2009
- No. of teams: 2
- Country: Spain
- Most recent champion: Mataró (2021)
- Most titles: Sabadell, 11 titles
- Website: www.rfen.es

Supercopa de España Femenina is the third most relevant tournament of Spanish women's water polo. It was established in 2009, being played the match usually in later September or early October.

It's played to a single match between the League's champion and the Copa de la Reina's winner. If a same team wins League & Cup, the Supercopa will be played between the League's champion and the Copa's runners-up.

== Winners by year ==
Year	Venue	Winner	Runners-up	Score
2009	Terrassa	(Catalonia) Sabadell	(Catalonia) Mediterrani	8–5
2010	Sabadell	(Catalonia) Sabadell	(Catalonia) Mediterrani	19–2
2011	Sabadell	(Catalonia) Sabadell	(Catalonia) Mediterrani	16–5
2012	Sabadell	(Catalonia) Sabadell	(Catalonia) Sant Andreu	11–5
2013	Barcelona	(Catalonia) Sabadell	(Catalonia) Terrassa	21–1
2014	Barcelona	(Catalonia) Sabadell	(Catalonia) Mataró	14–3
2015	Barcelona	(Catalonia) Sabadell	(Catalonia) Sant Andreu	12–5
2016	Mataró	(Catalonia) Sabadell	(Catalonia) Mataró	11–6
2017	Valencia	(Catalonia) Sabadell	(Catalonia) Mataró	10–5
2018	Valencia	(Catalonia) Sabadell	(Catalonia) Sant Andreu	8–5
2019	Sabadell	(Catalonia) Mataró	(Catalonia) Sabadell	10–10 (5–4)
2020	Sabadell	(Catalonia) Sabadell	(Catalonia) Mataró	11–6
2021	Sabadell	(Catalonia) Mataró	(Catalonia) Sabadell	10–8

== Titles by team ==
Team	Titles	Runners-up	Years won
(Catalonia) Sabadell	12	2	2009, 2010, 2011, 2012, 2013, 2014, 2015, 2016, 2017, 2018, 2020, 2023
(Catalonia) Mataró	2	4	2019, 2021
(Catalonia) Mediterrani	0	3	
(Catalonia) Sant Andreu	0	3	
(Catalonia) Terrassa	0	1	

== See also ==
- División de Honor Femenina
- Copa de la Reina
