= 2020–21 LEN Euro Cup knockout stage =

The 2020–21 LEN Euro Cup knockout phase occurred from 27 February to 8 May 2021.

== Qualified teams ==
The knockout phase involves the sixteen teams which qualified as winners and runners-up of each of the eight groups in the qualification round.

| Group | Winners | Runners-up |
|---|---|---|
| A | (France) Tourcoing | (Spain) Barcelona |
| B | (Spain) Sabadell | (Russia) Dynamo Moscow |
| C | (Hungary) OSC Budapest | (Serbia) Crvena zvezda |
| D | (Greece) Vouliagmeni | (France) Pays d’Aix Natation |
| E | (Serbia) Radnički Kragujevac | (Spain) Mediterrani |
| F | (Croatia) Mladost Zagreb | (Montenegro) Primorac Kotor |
| G | (Hungary) Szolnok | (France) Strasbourg |
| H | (Russia) Sintez Kazan | (Serbia) Novi Beograd |

== Format ==
In the eight-finals, the first-place team from one group faces the second-placed team from the other group. The eight winning teams advance to the quarterfinals. The four quarterfinal winners qualify for the semifinals, and the winners of the semifinals qualify for the finals.

Times were CET/CEST, (Note: CET (UTC+1) for dates up to 27 March 2021 (eight-finals, quarterfinals), and CEST (UTC+2) for dates thereafter (semifinals and finals).) as listed by LEN (local times, if different, are in parentheses).

== Schedule ==
The schedule is as follows.

| Round | Draw date | First leg | Second leg |
|---|---|---|---|
| Round of 16 | 16 December 2020 | 27 February 2021 | 6 March 2021 |
| Quarter-finals | 9 March 2021 | 17 March 2021 | 24 March 2021 |
| Semi-finals | 23 March 2021 | 3 April 2021 | 10 April 2021 |
| Final | 13 April 2021 | 24 April 2021 | 8 May 2021 |

== Bracket ==
Eight-finals
(Russia) Sintez Kazan | 12 | 6 | 18
(Russia) Dynamo Moscow | 14 | 9 | 23
(France) Tourcoing | 9 | 6 | 15
(Serbia) Crvena zvezda | 12 | 7 | 19
(Serbia) Radnički Kragujevac (w/o) | 11 | 11
(France) Strasbourg | 10 | 10
(Montenegro) Primorac Kotor | 8 | 16 | 24
(Hungary) Szolnok | 18 | 17 | 35
(France) Pays d’Aix Natation | 6 | 9 | 15
(Hungary) OSC Budapest | 22 | 20 | 42
(Spain) Sabadell | 9 | 17 | 26
(Spain) Mediterrani | 9 | 6 | 15
(Spain) Barcelona | 9 | 6 | 15
(Croatia) Mladost Zagreb | 11 | 7 | 18
(Serbia) Novi Beograd | 7 | 8 | 15
(Greece) Vouliagmeni | 7 | 9 | 16

Quarter-finals
(Russia) Dynamo Moscow | 8 | 9 | 17
(Serbia) Crvena zvezda | 11 | 9 | 20
(Serbia) Radnički Kragujevac | 12 | 10 | 22
(Hungary) Szolnok | 14 | 10 | 24
(Hungary) OSC Budapest | 17 | 10 | 27
(Spain) Sabadell | 11 | 12 | 23
(Croatia) Mladost Zagreb | 11 | 10 | 21 (8)
(Greece) Vouliagmeni (p) | 10 | 11 | 21 (9)

Semi-finals
(Serbia) Crvena zvezda | 12 | 8 | 20
(Hungary) Szolnok | 20 | 15 | 35
(Hungary) OSC Budapest | 10 | 11 | 21
(Greece) Vouliagmeni | 7 | 9 | 16

Finals
(Hungary) Szolnok | 14 | 8 | 22 (3)
(Hungary) OSC Budapest | 11 | 11 | 22 (0)

== Eight Finals ==
The draw for the eight-finals was held on 16 December 2020. The first legs were played on 27 February, and the second legs were played on 3 March 2021.

=== Overview ===
| Team 1 | Agg. | Team 2 | 1st leg | 2nd leg |
|---|---|---|---|---|
| Radnički Kragujevac (Serbia) | 11–10 (Note: Strasbourg could not play for the first leg due to a player testing positive to COVID-19. However, the primary reason for the suspension was a mistake made a few days earlier. Strasbourg did not undergo the mandatory PCR test two days before entering the hotel (the first testing had to be done 72 hours before the match, on Wednesday). As a result, it was decided that the match should be played on one leg, at Serbia, on the original date of the second leg.) | (France) Strasbourg | 11–10 | Suspended |
| Pays d’Aix Natation (France) | 15–42 | (Hungary) OSC Budapest | 6–22 | 9–20 |
| Tourcoing (France) | 15–19 | (Serbia) Crvena zvezda | 9–12 | 6–7 |
| Primorac Kotor (Montenegro) | 24–35 | (Hungary) Szolnok | 8–18 | 16–17 |
| Sabadell (Spain) | 26–15 | (Spain) Mediterrani | 9–9 | 17–6 |
| Novi Beograd (Serbia) | 15–16 | (Greece) Vouliagmeni | 7–7 | 8–9 |
| Sintez Kazan (Russia) | 18–23 | (Russia) Dynamo Moscow | 12–14 | 6–9 |
| Barcelona (Spain) | 15–18 | (Croatia) Mladost Zagreb | 9–11 | 6–7 |

=== Matches ===
| 27 February 2021; 18:00 | Report | Radnički Kragujevac (Serbia) | 11–10 | (France) Strasbourg | Bazen SPD Radnički, Kragujevac; Referees: Birakis (GRE), Segurana (ESP) |
| 27 February 2021; 18:00 | Report | Score by quarters: 2–2, 3–2, 4–3, 2–3 | | | Bazen SPD Radnički, Kragujevac; Referees: Birakis (GRE), Segurana (ESP) |
| 27 February 2021; 18:00 | Report | Ukropina 4 | Goals | Babić 4 | Bazen SPD Radnički, Kragujevac; Referees: Birakis (GRE), Segurana (ESP) |

Radnički Kragujevac won 11–10 on aggregate.

| 27 February 2021; 20:00 | Report | Pays d’Aix Natation (France) | 6–22 | (Hungary) OSC Budapest | Aix-en-Provence; Referees: Petronilli (ITA), Ohme (GER) |
| 27 February 2021; 20:00 | Report | Score by quarters: 2–7, 0–3, 3–5, 1–7 | | | Aix-en-Provence; Referees: Petronilli (ITA), Ohme (GER) |
| 27 February 2021; 20:00 | Report | Monneret 2 | Goals | Manhercz 6 | Aix-en-Provence; Referees: Petronilli (ITA), Ohme (GER) |

| 6 March 2021; 19:00 | Report | OSC Budapest (Hungary) | 20–9 | (France) Pays d’Aix Natation | Nyéki Imre Uszoda, Budapest |
| 6 March 2021; 19:00 | Report | Score by quarters: 4–2, 5–3, 6–2, 5–2 | | | Nyéki Imre Uszoda, Budapest |
| 6 March 2021; 19:00 | Report | Manhercz 6 | Goals | three players 2 | Nyéki Imre Uszoda, Budapest |

OSC Budapest won 42–15 on aggregate.

| 27 February 2021; 18:00 | Report | Tourcoing (France) | 9–12 | (Serbia) Crvena zvezda | Tourcoing |
| 27 February 2021; 18:00 | Report | Score by quarters: 3–4, 0–0, 2–3, 4–5 | | | Tourcoing |
| 27 February 2021; 18:00 | Report | Kujačić 3 | Goals | Tankosić 4 | Tourcoing |

| 6 March 2021; 18:00 | Report | Crvena zvezda (Serbia) | 7–6 | (France) Tourcoing | Bazen 25. maj, Belgrade; Referees: Boudramis (GRE), Vogel (HUN) |
| 6 March 2021; 18:00 | Report | Score by quarters: 0–1, 2–1, 3–3, 2–1 | | | Bazen 25. maj, Belgrade; Referees: Boudramis (GRE), Vogel (HUN) |
| 6 March 2021; 18:00 | Report | Tankosić 3 | Goals | Križman 3 | Bazen 25. maj, Belgrade; Referees: Boudramis (GRE), Vogel (HUN) |

Crvena zvezda won 19–15 on aggregate.

| 27 February 2021; 18:00 | Report | Primorac Kotor (Montenegro) | 8–18 | (Hungary) Szolnok | Bazen "Nikša Bućin", Kotor; Referees: Tiozzo (CRO), Bianco (ITA) |
| 27 February 2021; 18:00 | Report | Score by quarters: 2–4, 1–4, 1–5, 4–5 | | | Bazen "Nikša Bućin", Kotor; Referees: Tiozzo (CRO), Bianco (ITA) |
| 27 February 2021; 18:00 | Report | Molthen 3 | Goals | Filipović, Drašović 4 | Bazen "Nikša Bućin", Kotor; Referees: Tiozzo (CRO), Bianco (ITA) |

| 6 March 2021; 18:00 | Report | Szolnok (Hungary) | 17–16 | (Montenegro) Primorac Kotor | Vízilabda Aréna, Szolnok; Referees: Seidel (GER), Galkin (RUS) |
| 6 March 2021; 18:00 | Report | Score by quarters: 3–4, 6–5, 5–3, 3–4 | | | Vízilabda Aréna, Szolnok; Referees: Seidel (GER), Galkin (RUS) |
| 6 March 2021; 18:00 | Report | four players 3 | Goals | Drašković 7 | Vízilabda Aréna, Szolnok; Referees: Seidel (GER), Galkin (RUS) |

Szolnok won 35–24 on aggregate.

| 27 February 2021; 13:45 | Report | Sabadell (Spain) | 9–9 | (Spain) Mediterrani | Piscina Can Llong, Sabadell; Referees: Bouchez (FRA), Hentschel (GER) |
| 27 February 2021; 13:45 | Report | Score by quarters: 1–2, 2–2, 5–3, 1–2 | | | Piscina Can Llong, Sabadell; Referees: Bouchez (FRA), Hentschel (GER) |
| 27 February 2021; 13:45 | Report | Cabanas 4 | Goals | Corres 4 | Piscina Can Llong, Sabadell; Referees: Bouchez (FRA), Hentschel (GER) |

| 6 March 2021; 18:00 | Report | Mediterrani (Spain) | 6–17 | (Spain) Sabadell | Barcelona; Referees: Franulović (CRO), Matijašević (MNE) |
| 6 March 2021; 18:00 | Report | Score by quarters: 2–6, 1–4, 2–2, 1–5 | | | Barcelona; Referees: Franulović (CRO), Matijašević (MNE) |
| 6 March 2021; 18:00 | Report | Vujović 2 | Goals | Valera 4 | Barcelona; Referees: Franulović (CRO), Matijašević (MNE) |

AstralPool Sabadell won 26–15 on aggregate.

| 27 February 2021; 18:00 | Report | Novi Beograd (Serbia) | 7–7 | (Greece) Vouliagmeni | Belgrade; Referees: Petik (HUN), Golikov (RUS) |
| 27 February 2021; 18:00 | Report | Score by quarters: 3–3, 1–1, 1–1, 3–2 | | | Belgrade; Referees: Petik (HUN), Golikov (RUS) |
| 27 February 2021; 18:00 | Report | Bursać, Gogov 2 | Goals | Charalampos, Afroudakis 2 | Belgrade; Referees: Petik (HUN), Golikov (RUS) |

| 6 March 2021; 17:00 (18:00 EET) | Report | Vouliagmeni (Greece) | 9–8 | (Serbia) Novi Beograd | Vouliagmeni; Referees: Buch (ESP), Bourges (FRA) |
| 6 March 2021; 17:00 (18:00 EET) | Report | Score by quarters: 2–1, 1–2, 3–3, 3–2 | | | Vouliagmeni; Referees: Buch (ESP), Bourges (FRA) |
| 6 March 2021; 17:00 (18:00 EET) | Report | Mylonakis 3 | Goals | four players 2 | Vouliagmeni; Referees: Buch (ESP), Bourges (FRA) |

Vouliagmeni won 16–15 on aggregate.

| 27 February 2021; 16:00 (18:00 MSK) | Report | Sintez Kazan (Russia) | 12–14 | (Russia) Dynamo Moscow | Kazan; Referees: Turkkan (TUR), Anđelić (SRB) |
| 27 February 2021; 16:00 (18:00 MSK) | Report | Score by quarters: 2–2, 2–4, 4–4, 4–4 | | | Kazan; Referees: Turkkan (TUR), Anđelić (SRB) |
| 27 February 2021; 16:00 (18:00 MSK) | Report | Zakirov, Bychkov 3 | Goals | Bugaychuk 4 | Kazan; Referees: Turkkan (TUR), Anđelić (SRB) |

| 6 March 2021; 18:00 (20:00 MSK) | Report | Dynamo Moscow (Russia) | 9–6 | (Russia) Sintez Kazan | Moscow; Referees: Milović (SRB), Ivanovski (MNE) |
| 6 March 2021; 18:00 (20:00 MSK) | Report | Score by quarters: 2–0, 3–1, 3–3, 1–2 | | | Moscow; Referees: Milović (SRB), Ivanovski (MNE) |
| 6 March 2021; 18:00 (20:00 MSK) | Report | Usov 4 | Goals | Bychkov 2 | Moscow; Referees: Milović (SRB), Ivanovski (MNE) |

Dynamo Moscow won 23–18 on aggregate.

| 27 February 2021; 16:45 | Report | Barcelona (Spain) | 9–11 | (Croatia) Mladost Zagreb | Barcelona; Referees: Bender (GER), Fodor (HUN) |
| 27 February 2021; 16:45 | Report | Score by quarters: 1–2, 3–1, 2–4, 3–4 | | | Barcelona; Referees: Bender (GER), Fodor (HUN) |
| 27 February 2021; 16:45 | Report | three players 2 | Goals | Bukić 3 | Barcelona; Referees: Bender (GER), Fodor (HUN) |

| 6 March 2021; 18:00 | Report | Mladost Zagreb (Croatia) | 7–6 | (Spain) Barcelona | Bazeni Mladost, Zagreb; Referees: Gomez (ITA), Achladiotis (GRE) |
| 6 March 2021; 18:00 | Report | Score by quarters: 3–1, 1–3, 2–1, 1–1 | | | Bazeni Mladost, Zagreb; Referees: Gomez (ITA), Achladiotis (GRE) |
| 6 March 2021; 18:00 | Report | Miloš, Bukić 2 | Goals | three players 2 | Bazeni Mladost, Zagreb; Referees: Gomez (ITA), Achladiotis (GRE) |

Mladost Zagreb won 18–15 on aggregate.

== Quarter-finals ==
The draw for the quarter-finals was held on 9 March 2021. The first legs were played on 17 March, and the second legs were played on 24 March 2021.

=== Overview ===
| Team 1 | Agg. | Team 2 | 1st leg | 2nd leg |
|---|---|---|---|---|
| Dynamo Moscow (Russia) | 17–20 | (Serbia) Crvena zvezda | 8–11 | 9–9 |
| Radnički Kragujevac (Serbia) | 22–24 | (Hungary) Szolnok | 12–14 | 10–10 |
| Mladost Zagreb (Croatia) | 21–21(8–9 p) | (Greece) Vouliagmeni | 11–10 | 10–11 |
| OSC Budapest (Hungary) | 27–23 | (Spain) Sabadell | 17–11 | 10–12 |

=== Matches ===
| 17 March 2021; 16:00 (18:00 MSK) | Report | Dynamo Moscow (Russia) | 8–11 | (Serbia) Crvena zvezda | Moscow; Referees: Ðurašković (MNE), Schwartz (ISR) |
| 17 March 2021; 16:00 (18:00 MSK) | Report | Score by quarters: 3–4, 2–4, 1–1, 2–2 | | | Moscow; Referees: Ðurašković (MNE), Schwartz (ISR) |
| 17 March 2021; 16:00 (18:00 MSK) | Report | Bugaychuk 3 | Goals | Subotić 4 | Moscow; Referees: Ðurašković (MNE), Schwartz (ISR) |

| 24 March 2021; 18:30 | Report | Crvena zvezda (Serbia) | 9–9 | (Russia) Dynamo Moscow | Bazen 25. maj, Belgrade; Referees: Štampalija (CRO), Fodor (HUN) |
| 24 March 2021; 18:30 | Report | Score by quarters: 0–4, 2–1, 4–2, 3–2 | | | Bazen 25. maj, Belgrade; Referees: Štampalija (CRO), Fodor (HUN) |
| 24 March 2021; 18:30 | Report | Tankosić 3 | Goals | Rustamov 3 | Bazen 25. maj, Belgrade; Referees: Štampalija (CRO), Fodor (HUN) |

Crvena zvezda won 20–17 on aggregate.

| 17 March 2021; 20:00 | Report | Radnički Kragujevac (Serbia) | 12–14 | (Hungary) Szolnok | Bazen SPD Radnički, Kragujevac; Referees: Buch (ESP), Achladiotis (GRE) |
| 17 March 2021; 20:00 | Report | Score by quarters: 1–3, 5–3, 3–6, 3–2 | | | Bazen SPD Radnički, Kragujevac; Referees: Buch (ESP), Achladiotis (GRE) |
| 17 March 2021; 20:00 | Report | Rašović 5 | Goals | Szeghalmi, Nagy 3 | Bazen SPD Radnički, Kragujevac; Referees: Buch (ESP), Achladiotis (GRE) |

| 24 March 2021; 18:00 | Report | Szolnok (Hungary) | 10–10 | (Serbia) Radnički Kragujevac | Vízilabda Aréna, Szolnok; Referees: Petronilli (ITA), Golikov (RUS) |
| 24 March 2021; 18:00 | Report | Score by quarters: 3–4, 4–3, 2–1, 1–2 | | | Vízilabda Aréna, Szolnok; Referees: Petronilli (ITA), Golikov (RUS) |
| 24 March 2021; 18:00 | Report | four players 2 | Goals | Toholj 3 | Vízilabda Aréna, Szolnok; Referees: Petronilli (ITA), Golikov (RUS) |

Crvena zvezda won 24–22 on aggregate.

| 17 March 2021; 18:00 | Report | Mladost Zagreb (Croatia) | 11–10 | (Greece) Vouliagmeni | Bazeni Mladost, Zagreb; Referees: Colombo (ITA), Ortega (ESP) |
| 17 March 2021; 18:00 | Report | Score by quarters: 3–3, 3–3, 2–1, 3–3 | | | Bazeni Mladost, Zagreb; Referees: Colombo (ITA), Ortega (ESP) |
| 17 March 2021; 18:00 | Report | three players 3 | Goals | Afroudakis 3 | Bazeni Mladost, Zagreb; Referees: Colombo (ITA), Ortega (ESP) |

| 24 March 2021; 17:00 (18:00 EET) | Report | Vouliagmeni (Greece) | 20–18 (PSO) | (Croatia) Mladost Zagreb | Vouliagmeni; Referees: Vogel (HUN), Haentschel (GER) |
| 24 March 2021; 17:00 (18:00 EET) | Report | Score by quarters: 3–4, 3–1, 1–2, 4–3 PSO: 9–8 | | | Vouliagmeni; Referees: Vogel (HUN), Haentschel (GER) |
| 24 March 2021; 17:00 (18:00 EET) | Report | Kalogeropoulos 4 | Goals | Lazić 5 | Vouliagmeni; Referees: Vogel (HUN), Haentschel (GER) |

21–21 on aggregate. Vouliagmeni won 9–8 on penalties.

| 17 March 2021; 18:30 | Report | OSC Budapest (Hungary) | 17–11 | (Spain) Sabadell | Nyéki Imre Uszoda, Budapest; Referees: Periš (CRO), De Jong (NED) |
| 17 March 2021; 18:30 | Report | Score by quarters: 2–4, 5–0, 3–4, 7–3 | | | Nyéki Imre Uszoda, Budapest; Referees: Periš (CRO), De Jong (NED) |
| 17 March 2021; 18:30 | Report | Manhercz 4 | Goals | Sanahuja 4 | Nyéki Imre Uszoda, Budapest; Referees: Periš (CRO), De Jong (NED) |

| 24 March 2021; 13:30 | Report | Sabadell (Spain) | 12–10 | (Hungary) OSC Budapest | Piscina Can Llong, Sabadell; Referees: Gomez (ESP), Filippo (ITA) |
| 24 March 2021; 13:30 | Report | Score by quarters: 3–5, 3–2, 3–1, 3–2 | | | Piscina Can Llong, Sabadell; Referees: Gomez (ESP), Filippo (ITA) |
| 24 March 2021; 13:30 | Report | Valera 4 | Goals | Manhercz, Burián 2 | Piscina Can Llong, Sabadell; Referees: Gomez (ESP), Filippo (ITA) |

OSC Budapest won 27–23 on aggregate.

== Semi-finals ==
The draw for the semi-finals was held on 23 March 2021. The first legs were played on 3 April, and the second legs were played on 10 April 2021.

=== Overview ===
| Team 1 | Agg. | Team 2 | 1st leg | 2nd leg |
|---|---|---|---|---|
| OSC Budapest (Hungary) | 21–16 | (Greece) Vouliagmeni | 10–7 | 11–9 |
| Crvena zvezda (Serbia) | 20–35 | (Hungary) Szolnok | 12–20 | 8–15 |

=== Matches ===
| 3 April 2021; 16:30 | Report | OSC Budapest (Hungary) | 10–7 | (Greece) Vouliagmeni | Nyéki Imre Uszoda, Budapest; Referees: Putniković (SRB), Buch (ESP) |
| 3 April 2021; 16:30 | Report | Score by quarters: 4–2, 3–0, 2–3, 1–2 | | | Nyéki Imre Uszoda, Budapest; Referees: Putniković (SRB), Buch (ESP) |
| 3 April 2021; 16:30 | Report | Csacsovszky, Erdélyi 2 | Goals | Gouvis 4 | Nyéki Imre Uszoda, Budapest; Referees: Putniković (SRB), Buch (ESP) |

| 10 April 2021; 18:00 | Report | Vouliagmeni (Greece) | 9–11 | (Hungary) OSC Budapest | Vouliagmeni; Referees: Severo (ITA), Ivanovski (MNE) |
| 10 April 2021; 18:00 | Report | Score by quarters: 3–3, 2–2, 3–4, 1–2 | | | Vouliagmeni; Referees: Severo (ITA), Ivanovski (MNE) |
| 10 April 2021; 18:00 | Report | three players 2 | Goals | four players 2 | Vouliagmeni; Referees: Severo (ITA), Ivanovski (MNE) |

OSC Budapest won 21–16 on aggregate.

| 3 April 2021; 19:00 | Report | Crvena zvezda (Serbia) | 12–20 | (Hungary) Szolnok | Bazen 25. maj, Belgrade; Referees: Stavridis (GRE), Franulović (CRO) |
| 3 April 2021; 19:00 | Report | Score by quarters: 1–4, 5–6, 2–6, 4–4 | | | Bazen 25. maj, Belgrade; Referees: Stavridis (GRE), Franulović (CRO) |
| 3 April 2021; 19:00 | Report | Tankosić 3 | Goals | Schmölcz 4 | Bazen 25. maj, Belgrade; Referees: Stavridis (GRE), Franulović (CRO) |

| 10 April 2021; 18:00 | Report | Szolnok (Hungary) | 15–8 | (Serbia) Crvena zvezda | Vízilabda Aréna, Szolnok; Referees: Sadekov (RUS), de Jong (NED) |
| 10 April 2021; 18:00 | Report | Score by quarters: 4–1, 4–3, 2–2, 5–2 | | | Vízilabda Aréna, Szolnok; Referees: Sadekov (RUS), de Jong (NED) |
| 10 April 2021; 18:00 | Report | Konarik 4 | Goals | Subotić 3 | Vízilabda Aréna, Szolnok; Referees: Sadekov (RUS), de Jong (NED) |

Szolnok won 35–20 on aggregate.

== Finals ==
The first legs were played on 24 April, and the second legs were played on 8 May 2021.

=== Overview ===
| Team 1 | Agg. | Team 2 | 1st leg | 2nd leg |
|---|---|---|---|---|
| Szolnok (Hungary) | 22–22(0–3 p) | (Hungary) OSC Budapest | 14–11 | 8–11 |

=== Matches ===
| 24 April 2021; 19:15 | Report | Szolnok (Hungary) | 14–11 | (Hungary) OSC Budapest | Vízilabda Aréna, Szolnok; Referees: Peris (CRO), Gomez (ESP) |
| 24 April 2021; 19:15 | Report | Score by quarters: 2–3, 5–4, 3–1, 4–3 | | | Vízilabda Aréna, Szolnok; Referees: Peris (CRO), Gomez (ESP) |
| 24 April 2021; 19:15 | Report | Filipović 5 | Goals | Manhercz 3 | Vízilabda Aréna, Szolnok; Referees: Peris (CRO), Gomez (ESP) |

| 8 May 2021; 16:00 | Report | OSC Budapest (Hungary) | 11–11; PSO: 0–3 | (Hungary) Szolnok | Nyéki Imre Uszoda, Budapest; Referees: Gomez (ITA), Boudramis (GRE) |
| 8 May 2021; 16:00 | Report | Score by quarters: 2–2, 3–3, 2–2, 4–1 | | | Nyéki Imre Uszoda, Budapest; Referees: Gomez (ITA), Boudramis (GRE) |
| 8 May 2021; 16:00 | Report | Erdélyi 5 | Goals | Konarnik 4 | Nyéki Imre Uszoda, Budapest; Referees: Gomez (ITA), Boudramis (GRE) |
