= Copa del Rey de Waterpolo =

- Sport: Water polo
- Founded: 1986
- No. of teams: 8
- Country: Spain
- Most recent champion: Atlètic-Barceloneta (2026)
- Broadcasters: Teledeporte; RTVE Play; Esport3
- Website: RFEN

Copa del Rey de Water polo is the second most important competition of water polo played in Spain. Inaugural edition was played in 1986. The tournament is hosted by Real Federación Española de Natación.

Top eight teams at half-season in División de Honor competes in the Copa del Rey. The competition is usually held in mid-February.

== Winners by year ==
Year	Venue	Winners	Runners-up	Score
1987	Two legs	Catalunya	Barcelona	7–6, 11–13
1988	Two legs	Catalunya	Barcelona	7–4, 9–12
1989	Barcelona	Barcelona	Catalunya	10–9
1990	Two legs	Catalunya	Barcelona	8–8, 10–9
1991	Two legs	Barcelona	Mediterrani	13–19, 12–8
1992	Two legs	Catalunya	Terrassa	14–8, 8–10
1993	Two legs	Mediterrani	Barcelona	11–12, 12–11
1994	Barcelona	Catalunya	Mediterrani	9–7
1995	Barcelona	Barcelona	Mediterrani	11–7
1996	Barcelona	Barcelona	Mediterrani	6–2
1997	Barcelona	Catalunya	Poble Nou	7–6
1998	Madrid	Sabadell	Real Canoe	6–5
1999	Terrassa	Barcelona	Real Canoe	10–9
2000	Alcorcón	Atlètic-Barceloneta	Real Canoe	8–6
2001	Zaragoza	Atlètic-Barceloneta	Real Canoe	11–3
2002	Sabadell	Barcelona	Sabadell	10–9
2003	Barcelona	Barcelona	Atlètic-Barceloneta	8–6
2004	Barcelona	Atlètic-Barceloneta	Barcelona	6–5
2005	Alcorcón	Sabadell	Barcelona	5–4
2006	Puerto de la Cruz	Atlètic-Barceloneta	Sabadell	11–4

Year	Venue	Winners	Runners-up	Score
2007	Terrassa	Atlètic-Barceloneta	Terrassa	10–5
2008	Zaragoza	Atlètic-Barceloneta	Sant Andreu	11–5
2009	Sabadell	Atlètic-Barceloneta	Terrassa	10–7
2010	Barcelona	Atlètic-Barceloneta	Sabadell	12–6
2011	Barcelona	Barcelona	Atlètic-Barceloneta	7–3
2012	Barcelona	Sabadell	Atlètic-Barceloneta	11–10
2013	Barcelona	Atlètic-Barceloneta	Real Canoe	14–5
2014	Barcelona	Atlètic-Barceloneta	Sant Andreu	14–5
2015	Barcelona	Atlètic-Barceloneta	Mataró Quadis	11–5
2016	Barcelona	Atlètic-Barceloneta	Sant Andreu	7–6
2017	Barcelona	Atlètic-Barceloneta	Sabadell	10–5
2018	Tenerife	Atlètic-Barceloneta	Terrassa	13–8
2019	Mataró	Atlètic-Barceloneta	Mediterrani	12–2
2020	Sabadell	Atlètic-Barceloneta	Terrassa	12–6
2021	Barcelona	Atlètic-Barceloneta	Barcelona	9–3
2022	Sabadell	Atlètic-Barceloneta	Sabadell	12–5
2023	Sabadell	Atlètic-Barceloneta	Sabadell	9–9^{4–3}
2024	Palma	Atlètic-Barceloneta	Sabadell	10–6
2025	Barcelona	Atlètic-Barceloneta	Sabadell	14–5
2026	Terrassa	Atlètic-Barceloneta	Sabadell	11–5

== Winners by team ==
Team	Titles	Years
Atlètic-Barceloneta	22	2000, 2001, 2004, 2006, 2007, 2008, 2009, 2010, 2013, 2014, 2015, 2016, 2017, 2018, 2019, 2020, 2021, 2022, 2023, 2024, 2025, 2026
Barcelona	8	1989, 1991, 1995, 1996, 1999, 2002, 2003, 2011
Catalunya	6	1987, 1988, 1990, 1992, 1994, 1997
Sabadell	3	1998, 2005, 2012
Mediterrani	1	1993

== See also ==
- División de Honor
- Supercopa de España
