= Water polo at the 2013 World Aquatics Championships – Women's tournament =

Women's water polo 2013 World Aquatics Championships
Tournament details
- Venue(s): 1 (in 1 host city)
- Dates: 21 July – 2 August
- Teams: 16 (from 5 confederations)

Final positions
- Champions: Spain (1st title)
- Runners-up: Australia
- Third place: Hungary
- Fourth place: Russia

Tournament statistics
- Matches played: 44
- Goals scored: 896 (20.36 per match)
- Attendance: 35,980 (818 per match)
- Top scorer(s): (Netherlands) Lieke Klaassen (25 goals)

Awards
- Best player: (Spain) Jennifer Pareja

The women's water polo tournament at the 2013 World Aquatics Championships, organised by the FINA, was held in the Piscines Bernat Picornell in Barcelona, Spain from 21 July to 2 August 2013.

Spain defeated Australia 8–6 in the final match to capture their first world championship title.

== Qualification ==
16 teams qualified for the world championships in 2013 as follows:

- The host nation
- The best 2 teams in the 2012 World League not already qualified as the host nation
- The best 4 teams in the 2012 Olympics not already qualified as the host nation or from the World League
- The best 3 teams in the 2012 European Championships not already qualified as the host nation, from the World League, or from the Olympics
- The best 2 teams in the 2013 Americas Qualification Tournament not already qualified as the host nation, from the World League, or from the Olympics
- The best 2 teams from Asia (qualification system yet to be organised) not already qualified as the host nation, from the World League, or from the Olympics
- The best team from Africa (qualification system yet to be organised) not already qualified as the host nation, from the World League, or from the Olympics
- The best team from Oceania (qualification system yet to be organised) not already qualified as the host nation, from the World League, or from the Olympics
- If no team enters from a continent or if a team qualified as the host nation, from the World League, or from the Olympics does not enter, then each vacancy shall be filled by the next highest placed team(s) from the continental qualification tournament with the following rotation: Americas, Europe, Host Continent, Asia, Oceania and Africa.

Event	Date	Location	Vacancies	Qualified
Host nation	–	–	1	Spain
2012 World League Finals	29 May-3 June 2012	(China) Changshu	2	United States; Australia
2012 Olympics	30 July–11 August 2012	(United Kingdom) London	4	Hungary; China; Russia; Italy
2012 European Championships	18–28 January 2012	(Netherlands) Eindhoven	3	Greece; Netherlands; Great Britain
2013 Americas Qualification Tournament	January 2013	(Canada) Calgary	2	Canada; Brazil
Asia			2	Kazakhstan; Uzbekistan
Africa			1	South Africa
Oceania			1	New Zealand
TOTAL			16	

== Preliminary round ==
=== Group A ===
All times are CEST (UTC+2).

	Pld	W	D	L	GF	GA	GD	Pts
Russia	3	2	1	0	41	24	+17	5
Spain	3	2	0	1	40	23	+17	4
Netherlands	3	1	1	1	54	29	+25	3
Uzbekistan	3	0	0	3	13	72	−59	0

21 July 2013; 09:30	Match 1	Russia	22–6	Uzbekistan	Piscines Bernat Picornell, Barcelona; Attendance: 225; Referees: Terepenka (CAN), Makita (JPN)
21 July 2013; 09:30	Match 1	Score by quarters: 5–1, 6–1, 5–2, 6–2			Piscines Bernat Picornell, Barcelona; Attendance: 225; Referees: Terepenka (CAN), Makita (JPN)
21 July 2013; 09:30	Match 1	Prokofyeva 6	Goals	three players 2	Piscines Bernat Picornell, Barcelona; Attendance: 225; Referees: Terepenka (CAN), Makita (JPN)

21 July 2013; 21:30	Match 8	Spain	14–12	Netherlands	Piscines Bernat Picornell, Barcelona; Attendance: 1,300; Referees: Bianchi (ITA), Bender (GER)
21 July 2013; 21:30	Match 8	Score by quarters: 2–4, 5–1, 3–3, 4–4			Piscines Bernat Picornell, Barcelona; Attendance: 1,300; Referees: Bianchi (ITA), Bender (GER)
21 July 2013; 21:30	Match 8	Espar, Peña 3	Goals	Smit 4	Piscines Bernat Picornell, Barcelona; Attendance: 1,300; Referees: Bianchi (ITA), Bender (GER)

23 July 2013; 20:10	Match 15	Uzbekistan	3–30	Netherlands	Piscines Bernat Picornell, Barcelona; Attendance: 500; Referees: Makita (JPN), Moller (ARG)
23 July 2013; 20:10	Match 15	Score by quarters: 1–7, 0–9, 1–6, 1–8			Piscines Bernat Picornell, Barcelona; Attendance: 500; Referees: Makita (JPN), Moller (ARG)
23 July 2013; 20:10	Match 15	three players 1	Goals	Klaassen 6	Piscines Bernat Picornell, Barcelona; Attendance: 500; Referees: Makita (JPN), Moller (ARG)

23 July 2013; 21:30	Match 16	Spain	6–7	Russia	Piscines Bernat Picornell, Barcelona; Attendance: 1,500; Referees: Drury (USA), Flahive (AUS)
23 July 2013; 21:30	Match 16	Score by quarters: 0–1, 2–1, 1–3, 3–2			Piscines Bernat Picornell, Barcelona; Attendance: 1,500; Referees: Drury (USA), Flahive (AUS)
23 July 2013; 21:30	Match 16	López 3	Goals	Prokofyeva 4	Piscines Bernat Picornell, Barcelona; Attendance: 1,500; Referees: Drury (USA), Flahive (AUS)

25 July 2013; 17:30	Match 21	Russia	12–12	Netherlands	Piscines Bernat Picornell, Barcelona; Attendance: 300; Referees: Bianchi (ITA), Stavridis (GRE)
25 July 2013; 17:30	Match 21	Score by quarters: 3–3, 4–2, 1–2, 4–5			Piscines Bernat Picornell, Barcelona; Attendance: 300; Referees: Bianchi (ITA), Stavridis (GRE)
25 July 2013; 17:30	Match 21	Beliaeva, Ivanova 3	Goals	Klaassen 4	Piscines Bernat Picornell, Barcelona; Attendance: 300; Referees: Bianchi (ITA), Stavridis (GRE)

25 July 2013; 21:30	Match 24	Spain	20–4	Uzbekistan	Piscines Bernat Picornell, Barcelona; Attendance: 800; Referees: Vogel (HUN), Drury (USA)
25 July 2013; 21:30	Match 24	Score by quarters: 8–1, 3–0, 6–0, 3–3			Piscines Bernat Picornell, Barcelona; Attendance: 800; Referees: Vogel (HUN), Drury (USA)
25 July 2013; 21:30	Match 24	Blas 6	Goals	Plyusova, Halikova 2	Piscines Bernat Picornell, Barcelona; Attendance: 800; Referees: Vogel (HUN), Drury (USA)

=== Group B ===
All times are CEST (UTC+2).

	Pld	W	D	L	GF	GA	GD	Pts
Australia	3	3	0	0	45	10	+35	6
China	3	2	0	1	35	21	+14	4
New Zealand	3	1	0	2	22	35	−13	2
South Africa	3	0	0	3	10	46	−36	0

21 July 2013; 10:50	Match 2	Australia	15–4	New Zealand	Piscines Bernat Picornell, Barcelona; Attendance: 320; Referees: Vogel (HUN), Cardenuto (BRA)
21 July 2013; 10:50	Match 2	Score by quarters: 3–1, 4–2, 4–0, 4–1			Piscines Bernat Picornell, Barcelona; Attendance: 320; Referees: Vogel (HUN), Cardenuto (BRA)
21 July 2013; 10:50	Match 2	Webster 4	Goals	Mason 2	Piscines Bernat Picornell, Barcelona; Attendance: 320; Referees: Vogel (HUN), Cardenuto (BRA)

21 July 2013; 12:10	Match 3	China	17–2	South Africa	Piscines Bernat Picornell, Barcelona; Attendance: 150; Referees: Drury, Littlejohn (GBR)
21 July 2013; 12:10	Match 3	Score by quarters: 4–0, 4–0, 5–0, 4–2			Piscines Bernat Picornell, Barcelona; Attendance: 150; Referees: Drury, Littlejohn (GBR)
21 July 2013; 12:10	Match 3	Ma Huanhuan 5	Goals	L. Keet, M. Keet 1	Piscines Bernat Picornell, Barcelona; Attendance: 150; Referees: Drury, Littlejohn (GBR)

23 July 2013; 09:30	Match 9	South Africa	7–13	New Zealand	Piscines Bernat Picornell, Barcelona; Attendance: 200; Referees: Koryzna (POL), Abramović (MNE)
23 July 2013; 09:30	Match 9	Score by quarters: 2–3, 1–3, 1–3, 3–4			Piscines Bernat Picornell, Barcelona; Attendance: 200; Referees: Koryzna (POL), Abramović (MNE)
23 July 2013; 09:30	Match 9	White 3	Goals	Hudson, Myles 4	Piscines Bernat Picornell, Barcelona; Attendance: 200; Referees: Koryzna (POL), Abramović (MNE)

23 July 2013; 10:50	Match 10	Australia	14–5	China	Piscines Bernat Picornell, Barcelona; Attendance: 400; Referees: Bianchi (ITA), Bender (GER)
23 July 2013; 10:50	Match 10	Score by quarters: 1–3, 3–2, 6–0, 4–0			Piscines Bernat Picornell, Barcelona; Attendance: 400; Referees: Bianchi (ITA), Bender (GER)
23 July 2013; 10:50	Match 10	McGhie 3	Goals	Liu Ping 2	Piscines Bernat Picornell, Barcelona; Attendance: 400; Referees: Bianchi (ITA), Bender (GER)

25 July 2013; 18:50	Match 22	Australia	16–1	South Africa	Piscines Bernat Picornell, Barcelona; Attendance: 200; Referees: Makita (JPN), Balfanbayev (KAZ)
25 July 2013; 18:50	Match 22	Score by quarters: 4–0, 5–1, 5–0, 2–0			Piscines Bernat Picornell, Barcelona; Attendance: 200; Referees: Makita (JPN), Balfanbayev (KAZ)
25 July 2013; 18:50	Match 22	Lincoln-Smith, Webster 3	Goals	White 1	Piscines Bernat Picornell, Barcelona; Attendance: 200; Referees: Makita (JPN), Balfanbayev (KAZ)

25 July 2013; 20:10	Match 23	China	13–5	New Zealand	Piscines Bernat Picornell, Barcelona; Attendance: 400; Referees: Cardenuto (BRA), Littlejohn (GBR)
25 July 2013; 20:10	Match 23	Score by quarters: 2–0, 4–1, 5–3, 2–1			Piscines Bernat Picornell, Barcelona; Attendance: 400; Referees: Cardenuto (BRA), Littlejohn (GBR)
25 July 2013; 20:10	Match 23	Sun Yujun, Song Donglun 3	Goals	Myles 2	Piscines Bernat Picornell, Barcelona; Attendance: 400; Referees: Cardenuto (BRA), Littlejohn (GBR)

=== Group C ===
All times are CEST (UTC+2).

	Pld	W	D	L	GF	GA	GD	Pts
United States	3	3	0	0	38	20	+18	6
Canada	3	1	1	1	30	27	+3	3
Greece	3	1	1	1	29	27	+2	3
Great Britain	3	0	0	3	20	43	−23	0

21 July 2013; 13:30	Match 4	United States	12–8	Greece	Piscines Bernat Picornell, Barcelona; Attendance: 360; Referees: Borrell (ESP), Koryzna (POL)
21 July 2013; 13:30	Match 4	Score by quarters: 1–2, 3–2, 4–2, 4–2			Piscines Bernat Picornell, Barcelona; Attendance: 360; Referees: Borrell (ESP), Koryzna (POL)
21 July 2013; 13:30	Match 4	Steffens 3	Goals	Tsoukala, Roumpesi 3	Piscines Bernat Picornell, Barcelona; Attendance: 360; Referees: Borrell (ESP), Koryzna (POL)

21 July 2013; 17:30	Match 5	Canada	14–9	Great Britain	Piscines Bernat Picornell, Barcelona; Attendance: 300; Referees: Flahive (AUS), Moller (ARG)
21 July 2013; 17:30	Match 5	Score by quarters: 3–2, 4–3, 4–3, 3–1			Piscines Bernat Picornell, Barcelona; Attendance: 300; Referees: Flahive (AUS), Moller (ARG)
21 July 2013; 17:30	Match 5	Alogbo 4	Goals	Gibson-Byrne 4	Piscines Bernat Picornell, Barcelona; Attendance: 300; Referees: Flahive (AUS), Moller (ARG)

23 July 2013; 12:10	Match 11	Great Britain	7–13	Greece	Piscines Bernat Picornell, Barcelona; Attendance: 255; Referees: Reemnet (NED), Skovpina (UZB)
23 July 2013; 12:10	Match 11	Score by quarters: 1–1, 2–2, 2–5, 2–5			Piscines Bernat Picornell, Barcelona; Attendance: 255; Referees: Reemnet (NED), Skovpina (UZB)
23 July 2013; 12:10	Match 11	Gibson-Byrne, Gibson 2	Goals	Asimaki 5	Piscines Bernat Picornell, Barcelona; Attendance: 255; Referees: Reemnet (NED), Skovpina (UZB)

23 July 2013; 13:30	Match 12	United States	10–8	Canada	Piscines Bernat Picornell, Barcelona; Attendance: 200; Referees: Alexandrescu (ROU), Williams (NZL)
23 July 2013; 13:30	Match 12	Score by quarters: 4–1, 2–2, 3–2, 1–3			Piscines Bernat Picornell, Barcelona; Attendance: 200; Referees: Alexandrescu (ROU), Williams (NZL)
23 July 2013; 13:30	Match 12	Silver, Seidemann 2	Goals	Perreault 3	Piscines Bernat Picornell, Barcelona; Attendance: 200; Referees: Alexandrescu (ROU), Williams (NZL)

25 July 2013; 09:30	Match 17	United States	16–4	Great Britain	Piscines Bernat Picornell, Barcelona; Attendance: 500; Referees: Melliar (RSA), Flahive (AUS)
25 July 2013; 09:30	Match 17	Score by quarters: 4–0, 2–2, 3–1, 7–1			Piscines Bernat Picornell, Barcelona; Attendance: 500; Referees: Melliar (RSA), Flahive (AUS)
25 July 2013; 09:30	Match 17	Clark 3	Goals	Gibson-Byrne 2	Piscines Bernat Picornell, Barcelona; Attendance: 500; Referees: Melliar (RSA), Flahive (AUS)

25 July 2013; 10:50	Match 18	Canada	8–8	Greece	Piscines Bernat Picornell, Barcelona; Attendance: 650; Referees: Taylan (TUR), Peris (CRO)
25 July 2013; 10:50	Match 18	Score by quarters: 2–3, 2–3, 3–0, 1–2			Piscines Bernat Picornell, Barcelona; Attendance: 650; Referees: Taylan (TUR), Peris (CRO)
25 July 2013; 10:50	Match 18	Eggens 4	Goals	Tsoukala, Asimaki 2	Piscines Bernat Picornell, Barcelona; Attendance: 650; Referees: Taylan (TUR), Peris (CRO)

=== Group D ===
All times are CEST (UTC+2).

	Pld	W	D	L	GF	GA	GD	Pts
Hungary	3	3	0	0	48	17	+31	6
Italy	3	2	0	1	26	22	+4	4
Kazakhstan	3	1	0	2	23	32	−9	2
Brazil	3	0	0	3	16	42	−26	0

21 July 2013; 18:50	Match 6	Hungary	20–6	Brazil	Piscines Bernat Picornell, Barcelona; Attendance: 300; Referees: Naumov (RUS), Reemnet (NED)
21 July 2013; 18:50	Match 6	Score by quarters: 6–2, 3–0, 3–0, 8–4			Piscines Bernat Picornell, Barcelona; Attendance: 300; Referees: Naumov (RUS), Reemnet (NED)
21 July 2013; 18:50	Match 6	Keszthelyi 5	Goals	Zablith, Chiappini 2	Piscines Bernat Picornell, Barcelona; Attendance: 300; Referees: Naumov (RUS), Reemnet (NED)

21 July 2013; 20:10	Match 7	Italy	9–7	Kazakhstan	Piscines Bernat Picornell, Barcelona; Attendance: 600; Referees: Taylan (TUR), Ni (CHN)
21 July 2013; 20:10	Match 7	Score by quarters: 1–3, 5–0, 2–3, 1–1			Piscines Bernat Picornell, Barcelona; Attendance: 600; Referees: Taylan (TUR), Ni (CHN)
21 July 2013; 20:10	Match 7	Di Mario 3	Goals	Akilbayeva, Gritsenko 2	Piscines Bernat Picornell, Barcelona; Attendance: 600; Referees: Taylan (TUR), Ni (CHN)

23 July 2013; 17:30	Match 13	Kazakhstan	9–5	Brazil	Piscines Bernat Picornell, Barcelona; Attendance: 410; Referees: Taylan (TUR), Golijanin (SRB)
23 July 2013; 17:30	Match 13	Score by quarters: 2–2, 3–0, 2–0, 2–3			Piscines Bernat Picornell, Barcelona; Attendance: 410; Referees: Taylan (TUR), Golijanin (SRB)
23 July 2013; 17:30	Match 13	Jakayeva, Gritsenko 2	Goals	Chiappini 3	Piscines Bernat Picornell, Barcelona; Attendance: 410; Referees: Taylan (TUR), Golijanin (SRB)

23 July 2013; 18:50	Match 14	Hungary	10–4	Italy	Piscines Bernat Picornell, Barcelona; Attendance: 400; Referees: Borrell (ESP), Margeta (SLO)
23 July 2013; 18:50	Match 14	Score by quarters: 3–1, 3–1, 3–1, 1–1			Piscines Bernat Picornell, Barcelona; Attendance: 400; Referees: Borrell (ESP), Margeta (SLO)
23 July 2013; 18:50	Match 14	Keszthelyi, Bujka 4	Goals	four players 1	Piscines Bernat Picornell, Barcelona; Attendance: 400; Referees: Borrell (ESP), Margeta (SLO)

25 July 2013; 12:10	Match 19	Hungary	18–7	Kazakhstan	Piscines Bernat Picornell, Barcelona; Attendance: 200; Referees: Williams (NZL), Bender (GER)
25 July 2013; 12:10	Match 19	Score by quarters: 8–1, 4–2, 3–2, 3–2			Piscines Bernat Picornell, Barcelona; Attendance: 200; Referees: Williams (NZL), Bender (GER)
25 July 2013; 12:10	Match 19	Bujka 3	Goals	Jakayeva 4	Piscines Bernat Picornell, Barcelona; Attendance: 200; Referees: Williams (NZL), Bender (GER)

25 July 2013; 13:30	Match 20	Italy	13–5	Brazil	Piscines Bernat Picornell, Barcelona; Attendance: 200; Referees: Skovpina (UZB), Koganov (AZE)
25 July 2013; 13:30	Match 20	Score by quarters: 2–1, 6–0, 2–1, 3–3			Piscines Bernat Picornell, Barcelona; Attendance: 200; Referees: Skovpina (UZB), Koganov (AZE)
25 July 2013; 13:30	Match 20	three players 3	Goals	Zablith 2	Piscines Bernat Picornell, Barcelona; Attendance: 200; Referees: Skovpina (UZB), Koganov (AZE)

== Knockout stage ==
Championship bracket

Round of 16
27 July
Russia	22
South Africa	3
27 July
Canada	14
Kazakhstan	8
27 July
Australia	25
Uzbekistan	2
27 July
Italy	12
Greece	13
27 July
United States	14
Brazil	3
27 July
Spain	18
New Zealand	6
27 July
Hungary	14
Great Britain	5
27 July
China	10
Netherlands	11

Quarter-finals
29 July
Russia	17
Canada	9
29 July
Australia	9
Greece	5
29 July
United States	6
Spain	9
29 July
Hungary	11
Netherlands	7

Semi-finals
31 July
Russia	6
Australia	9
31 July
Spain	13
Hungary	12

Final
2 August
Australia	6
Spain	8
Third place
2 August
Russia	8
Hungary	10

5th place bracket

5–8th place classification
31 July
Canada	8
Greece	12
31 July
United States	12
Netherlands	11

5th place match
2 August
Greece	12
United States	15
7th place match
2 August
Canada	9
Netherlands	12

=== Quarterfinals qualification ===
All times are CEST (UTC+2).

27 July 2013; 09:30	Match 25	Russia	22–3	South Africa	Piscines Bernat Picornell, Barcelona; Attendance: 100; Referees: Ni (CHN), Vogel (HUN)
27 July 2013; 09:30	Match 25	Score by quarters: 5–0, 7–2, 6–1, 4–0			Piscines Bernat Picornell, Barcelona; Attendance: 100; Referees: Ni (CHN), Vogel (HUN)
27 July 2013; 09:30	Match 25	Beliaeva 5	Goals	three players 1	Piscines Bernat Picornell, Barcelona; Attendance: 100; Referees: Ni (CHN), Vogel (HUN)

27 July 2013; 10:50	Match 27	Australia	25–2	Uzbekistan	Piscines Bernat Picornell, Barcelona; Attendance: 100; Referees: Moller (ARG), Littlejohn (GBR)
27 July 2013; 10:50	Match 27	Score by quarters: 6–0, 5–1, 5–1, 9–0			Piscines Bernat Picornell, Barcelona; Attendance: 100; Referees: Moller (ARG), Littlejohn (GBR)
27 July 2013; 10:50	Match 27	Buckling 6	Goals	Sarancha 2	Piscines Bernat Picornell, Barcelona; Attendance: 100; Referees: Moller (ARG), Littlejohn (GBR)

27 July 2013; 12:10	Match 28	China	10–11	Netherlands	Piscines Bernat Picornell, Barcelona; Attendance: 300; Referees: Bender (GER), Flahive (AUS)
27 July 2013; 12:10	Match 28	Score by quarters: 2–2, 2–4, 3–2, 3–3			Piscines Bernat Picornell, Barcelona; Attendance: 300; Referees: Bender (GER), Flahive (AUS)
27 July 2013; 12:10	Match 28	Ma Huanhuan 4	Goals	Smit, Klaassen 3	Piscines Bernat Picornell, Barcelona; Attendance: 300; Referees: Bender (GER), Flahive (AUS)

27 July 2013; 13:30	Match 26	Spain	18–6	New Zealand	Piscines Bernat Picornell, Barcelona; Attendance: 450; Referees: Melliar (RSA), Golijanin (SRB)
27 July 2013; 13:30	Match 26	Score by quarters: 5–1, 4–2, 3–2, 6–1			Piscines Bernat Picornell, Barcelona; Attendance: 450; Referees: Melliar (RSA), Golijanin (SRB)
27 July 2013; 13:30	Match 26	Pareja 5	Goals	Hudson, Myles 2	Piscines Bernat Picornell, Barcelona; Attendance: 450; Referees: Melliar (RSA), Golijanin (SRB)

27 July 2013; 17:30	Match 29	United States	14–3	Brazil	Piscines Bernat Picornell, Barcelona; Attendance: 400; Referees: Makita (JPN), Skovpina (UZB)
27 July 2013; 17:30	Match 29	Score by quarters: 3–0, 7–1, 2–2, 2–0			Piscines Bernat Picornell, Barcelona; Attendance: 400; Referees: Makita (JPN), Skovpina (UZB)
27 July 2013; 17:30	Match 29	five players 2	Goals	three players 1	Piscines Bernat Picornell, Barcelona; Attendance: 400; Referees: Makita (JPN), Skovpina (UZB)

27 July 2013; 18:50	Match 30	Canada	14–8	Kazakhstan	Piscines Bernat Picornell, Barcelona; Attendance: 300; Referees: Williams (NZL), Taylan (TUR)
27 July 2013; 18:50	Match 30	Score by quarters: 4–2, 5–1, 3–3, 2–2			Piscines Bernat Picornell, Barcelona; Attendance: 300; Referees: Williams (NZL), Taylan (TUR)
27 July 2013; 18:50	Match 30	Eggens 4	Goals	Shepelina, Gritsenko 2	Piscines Bernat Picornell, Barcelona; Attendance: 300; Referees: Williams (NZL), Taylan (TUR)

27 July 2013; 20:10	Match 31	Hungary	14–5	Great Britain	Piscines Bernat Picornell, Barcelona; Attendance: 450; Referees: Terepenka (CAN), Drury (USA)
27 July 2013; 20:10	Match 31	Score by quarters: 4–2, 4–2, 2–0, 4–1			Piscines Bernat Picornell, Barcelona; Attendance: 450; Referees: Terepenka (CAN), Drury (USA)
27 July 2013; 20:10	Match 31	Bujka 5	Goals	Nixon 2	Piscines Bernat Picornell, Barcelona; Attendance: 450; Referees: Terepenka (CAN), Drury (USA)

27 July 2013; 21:30	Match 32	Italy	12–13	Greece	Piscines Bernat Picornell, Barcelona; Attendance: 400; Referees: Margeta (SLO), Borrell (ESP)
27 July 2013; 21:30	Match 32	Score by quarters: 2–2, 2–3, 1–2, 4–2 OT: 1–1, 0–0 PSO: 2–3			Piscines Bernat Picornell, Barcelona; Attendance: 400; Referees: Margeta (SLO), Borrell (ESP)
27 July 2013; 21:30	Match 32	Bianconi 3	Goals	Manolioudaki 4	Piscines Bernat Picornell, Barcelona; Attendance: 400; Referees: Margeta (SLO), Borrell (ESP)

=== Quarterfinals ===
All times are CEST (UTC+2).

29 July 2013; 15:30	Match 33	Russia	17–9	Canada	Piscines Bernat Picornell, Barcelona; Attendance: 560; Referees: Bender (GER), Peris (CRO)
29 July 2013; 15:30	Match 33	Score by quarters: 5–2, 3–1, 4–4, 5–2			Piscines Bernat Picornell, Barcelona; Attendance: 560; Referees: Bender (GER), Peris (CRO)
29 July 2013; 15:30	Match 33	Prokofyeva, Ivanova 4	Goals	Békhazi 4	Piscines Bernat Picornell, Barcelona; Attendance: 560; Referees: Bender (GER), Peris (CRO)

29 July 2013; 17:00	Match 34	Australia	9–5	Greece	Piscines Bernat Picornell, Barcelona; Attendance: 500; Referees: Margeta (SLO), Alexandrescu (ROU)
29 July 2013; 17:00	Match 34	Score by quarters: 3–1, 1–1, 2–2, 3–1			Piscines Bernat Picornell, Barcelona; Attendance: 500; Referees: Margeta (SLO), Alexandrescu (ROU)
29 July 2013; 17:00	Match 34	four players 2	Goals	Avramidou, Roumpesi 2	Piscines Bernat Picornell, Barcelona; Attendance: 500; Referees: Margeta (SLO), Alexandrescu (ROU)

29 July 2013; 20:15	Match 36	Netherlands	7–11	Hungary	Piscines Bernat Picornell, Barcelona; Attendance: 1,800; Referees: Moller (ARG), Taylan (TUR)
29 July 2013; 20:15	Match 36	Score by quarters: 1–5, 0–2, 3–2, 3–2			Piscines Bernat Picornell, Barcelona; Attendance: 1,800; Referees: Moller (ARG), Taylan (TUR)
29 July 2013; 20:15	Match 36	Klaassen 2	Goals	Keszthelyi 4	Piscines Bernat Picornell, Barcelona; Attendance: 1,800; Referees: Moller (ARG), Taylan (TUR)

29 July 2013; 21:45	Match 35	Spain	9–6	United States	Piscines Bernat Picornell, Barcelona; Attendance: 3,300; Referees: Koryzna (POL), Bianchi (ITA)
29 July 2013; 21:45	Match 35	Score by quarters: 4–2, 1–2, 1–1, 3–1			Piscines Bernat Picornell, Barcelona; Attendance: 3,300; Referees: Koryzna (POL), Bianchi (ITA)
29 July 2013; 21:45	Match 35	Pareja 4	Goals	Craig 3	Piscines Bernat Picornell, Barcelona; Attendance: 3,300; Referees: Koryzna (POL), Bianchi (ITA)

=== 5th–8th place classification ===
All times are CEST (UTC+2).

31 July 2013; 15:30	Match 37	Canada	8–12	Greece	Piscines Bernat Picornell, Barcelona; Attendance: 400; Referees: Moller (ARG), Taylan (TUR)
31 July 2013; 15:30	Match 37	Score by quarters: 1–5, 3–1, 1–5, 3–1			Piscines Bernat Picornell, Barcelona; Attendance: 400; Referees: Moller (ARG), Taylan (TUR)
31 July 2013; 15:30	Match 37	Wright, Eggens 2	Goals	Tsoukala 4	Piscines Bernat Picornell, Barcelona; Attendance: 400; Referees: Moller (ARG), Taylan (TUR)

31 July 2013; 17:00	Match 38	United States	12–11	Netherlands	Piscines Bernat Picornell, Barcelona; Attendance: 400; Referees: Peris (CRO), Flahive (AUS)
31 July 2013; 17:00	Match 38	Score by quarters: 2–2, 4–3, 3–2, 3–4			Piscines Bernat Picornell, Barcelona; Attendance: 400; Referees: Peris (CRO), Flahive (AUS)
31 July 2013; 17:00	Match 38	five players 2	Goals	Klaassen 4	Piscines Bernat Picornell, Barcelona; Attendance: 400; Referees: Peris (CRO), Flahive (AUS)

=== Semifinals ===
All times are CEST (UTC+2).

31 July 2013; 20:15	Match 39	Russia	6–9	Australia	Piscines Bernat Picornell, Barcelona; Attendance: 2,200; Referees: Margeta (SLO), Bianchi (ITA)
31 July 2013; 20:15	Match 39	Score by quarters: 2–1, 1–3, 1–2, 2–3			Piscines Bernat Picornell, Barcelona; Attendance: 2,200; Referees: Margeta (SLO), Bianchi (ITA)
31 July 2013; 20:15	Match 39	Ivanova 2	Goals	Zagame 3	Piscines Bernat Picornell, Barcelona; Attendance: 2,200; Referees: Margeta (SLO), Bianchi (ITA)

31 July 2013; 21:45	Match 40	Spain	13–12	Hungary	Piscines Bernat Picornell, Barcelona; Attendance: 3,200; Referees: Drury (USA), Alexandrescu (ROU)
31 July 2013; 21:45	Match 40	Score by quarters: 5–5, 4–4, 2–3, 2–0			Piscines Bernat Picornell, Barcelona; Attendance: 3,200; Referees: Drury (USA), Alexandrescu (ROU)
31 July 2013; 21:45	Match 40	Espar 4	Goals	Antal 4	Piscines Bernat Picornell, Barcelona; Attendance: 3,200; Referees: Drury (USA), Alexandrescu (ROU)

=== 7th place match ===
All times are CEST (UTC+2).

2 August 2013; 15:00	Match 41	Canada	9–12	Netherlands	Piscines Bernat Picornell, Barcelona; Attendance: 300; Referees: Vogel (HUN), Naumov (RUS)
2 August 2013; 15:00	Match 41	Score by quarters: 1–5, 2–3, 4–3, 2–1			Piscines Bernat Picornell, Barcelona; Attendance: 300; Referees: Vogel (HUN), Naumov (RUS)
2 August 2013; 15:00	Match 41	Valin 4	Goals	Smit, Klaassen 3	Piscines Bernat Picornell, Barcelona; Attendance: 300; Referees: Vogel (HUN), Naumov (RUS)

=== 5th place match ===
All times are CEST (UTC+2).

2 August 2013; 20:45	Match 42	Greece	12–15	United States	Piscines Bernat Picornell, Barcelona; Attendance: 4,400; Referees: Terepenka (CAN), Taylan (TUR)
2 August 2013; 20:45	Match 42	Score by quarters: 4–4, 1–2, 1–3, 4–1 OT: 1–0, 0–1 PSO: 1–4			Piscines Bernat Picornell, Barcelona; Attendance: 4,400; Referees: Terepenka (CAN), Taylan (TUR)
2 August 2013; 20:45	Match 42	Avramidou 4	Goals	Mathewson 3	Piscines Bernat Picornell, Barcelona; Attendance: 4,400; Referees: Terepenka (CAN), Taylan (TUR)

=== Bronze medal match ===
All times are CEST (UTC+2).

2 August 2013; 16:30	Match 43	Russia	8–10	Hungary	Piscines Bernat Picornell, Barcelona; Attendance: 1,250; Referees: Amber Drury (USA), Mario Bianchi (ITA)
2 August 2013; 16:30	Match 43	Score by quarters: 3–3, 2–2, 2–3, 1–2			Piscines Bernat Picornell, Barcelona; Attendance: 1,250; Referees: Amber Drury (USA), Mario Bianchi (ITA)
2 August 2013; 16:30	Match 43	A. Antonova 3 Belova, Beliaeva 2 Tankeeva 1	Goals	Keszthelyi, Tóth 3 Szűcs 2 Takács, Menczinger 1	Piscines Bernat Picornell, Barcelona; Attendance: 1,250; Referees: Amber Drury (USA), Mario Bianchi (ITA)

=== Gold medal match ===
All times are CEST (UTC+2).

2 August 2013; 22:15	Match 44	Australia	6–8	Spain	Piscines Bernat Picornell, Barcelona; Attendance: 4,500; Referees: Radoslaw Koryzna (POL), Axel Bender (GER)
2 August 2013; 22:15	Match 44	Score by quarters: 1–2, 2–3, 1–1, 2–2			Piscines Bernat Picornell, Barcelona; Attendance: 4,500; Referees: Radoslaw Koryzna (POL), Axel Bender (GER)
2 August 2013; 22:15	Match 44	Lincoln-Smith, Bishop, Webster, McGhie, Arancini, Southern 1	Goals	Pareja, García, López 2 Tarragó, Blas 1	Piscines Bernat Picornell, Barcelona; Attendance: 4,500; Referees: Radoslaw Koryzna (POL), Axel Bender (GER)

== Ranking and statistics ==
=== Final ranking ===
Rank	Team
1st place, gold medalist(s)	Spain
2nd place, silver medalist(s)	Australia
3rd place, bronze medalist(s)	Hungary
4	Russia
5	United States
6	Greece
7	Netherlands
8	Canada
9	China
10	Italy
11	Kazakhstan
12	New Zealand
13	Great Britain
14	Brazil
15	South Africa
16	Uzbekistan

2013 Women's Water Polo World champions

Spain
First title

Team Roster

Laura Ester, Marta Bach, Anni Espar, Roser Tarragó, Mati Ortiz, Jennifer Pareja (C), Lorena Miranda, Pili Peña, Andrea Blas, Ona Meseguer, Maica García, Laura López, Patri Herrera. Head Coach: Miki Oca.

=== Top goalscorers ===
Rank	Name	Goals	Shots	%
1	(Netherlands) Lieke Klaassen	25	42	59
2	(Hungary) Rita Keszthelyi	21	41	51
3	(Russia) Ekaterina Prokofyeva	19	42	45
4	(Hungary) Barbara Bujka	18	32	56
5	(Russia) Olga Beliaeva	17	28	61
6	(Spain) Jennifer Pareja	16	36	44
6	(Netherlands) Yasemin Smit	16	38	42
6	(Greece) Christina Tsoukala	16	46	35

Source: SportResult

=== Awards ===
Most Valuable Player

- (Spain) Jennifer Pareja

Best Goalscorer

- (Netherlands) Lieke Klaassen – 25 goals

Best Goalkeeper

- (Spain) Laura Ester

Media All-Star Team

- (Spain) Laura Ester – Goalkeeper
- (Hungary) Barbara Bujka – Centre forward
- (Hungary) Rita Keszthelyi
- (Netherlands) Lieke Klaassen
- (Spain) Jennifer Pareja
- (Russia) Ekaterina Prokofyeva
- (Australia) Rowena Webster
