= Copa de la Reina de Waterpolo =

- Sport: Water polo
- Founded: 1997
- No. of teams: 8
- Country: Spain
- Most recent champion: CN Sant Andreu (2025)
- Broadcasters: Teledeporte; RTVE Play; Esport 3
- Website: RFEN

Copa de la Reina de Water polo is the second most important competition of female water polo played in Spain. Inaugural edition was played in 1997. The best eight teams in the first round of the regular season dispute the trophy on February in a final-eight format.

== Winners by year ==
Year	Venue	Winners	Runners-up	Score
1997	Madrid	(Catalonia) CE Mediterrani	(Community of Madrid) CN Ondarreta Alcorcón	7-4
1998	Barcelona	(Catalonia) CE Mediterrani	(Catalonia) CN Catalunya	13-3
1999	Alcorcón	(Catalonia) CE Mediterrani	(Catalonia) CN Sabadell	7-6
2000	Barcelona	(Catalonia) CE Mediterrani	(Catalonia) CN Sabadell	8-7
2001	Alcorcón	(Catalonia) CN Sabadell	(Catalonia) CE Mediterrani	6-3
2002	Sant Feliu	(Catalonia) CN Sabadell	(Catalonia) CE Mediterrani	8–4
2003	Alcorcón	(Catalonia) CE Mediterrani	(Community of Madrid) CN Ondarreta Alcorcón	6–5
2004	Sabadell	(Catalonia) CNSabadell	(Catalonia) CE Mediterrani	10–6
2005	Alcorcón	(Catalonia) CN Sabadell	(Catalonia) CE Mediterrani	10–5
2006	Sabadell	(Community of Madrid) CN Ondarreta Alcorcón	(Catalonia) CN Sant Andreu	16–15
2007	Alcorcón	(Community of Madrid) CN Ondarreta Alcorcón	(Catalonia) CN Sabadell	11–10
2008	Sabadell	(Catalonia) CN Sabadell	(Catalonia) CE Mediterrani	12–4
2009	Dos Hermanas	(Catalonia) CN Sabadell	(Catalonia) CE Mediterrani	13–9
2010	Alcorcón	(Catalonia) CN Sabadell	(Catalonia) CN Mataró	10–4
2011	Barcelona	(Catalonia) CN Sabadell	(Catalonia) CE Mediterrani	18–8
2012	Dos Hermanas	(Catalonia) CN Sabadell	(Catalonia) CN Sant Andreu	16–5
2013	Sant Feliu	(Catalonia) CN Sabadell	(Catalonia) CN Terrassa	24–2
2014	Sabadell	(Catalonia) CN Sabadell	(Catalonia) CN Mataró	15–3
2015	Barcelona	(Catalonia) CN Sabadell	(Catalonia) CN Sant Andreu	11–4
2016	Sabadell	(Catalonia) CN Mataró	(Catalonia) CN Sabadell	9–7
2017	Terrassa	(Catalonia) CN Sabadell	(Catalonia) CN Mataró	14–7
2018	Barcelona	(Catalonia) CN Sabadell	(Catalonia) CN Terrassa	17–3
2019	Sant Feliu	(Catalonia) CN Sabadell	(Catalonia) CN Sant Andreu	11–9
2020	Sabadell	(Catalonia) CN Sabadell	(Catalonia) CN Terrassa	9–8
2021	Barcelona	(Catalonia) CN Sabadell	(Catalonia) CN Mataró	11–9
2022	Terrassa	(Catalonia) CN Mataró	(Catalonia) CN Sabadell	7–4
2023	Terrassa	(Catalonia) CN Sabadell	(Catalonia) CN Mataró	8–6
2024	Sabadell	(Catalonia) CN Sant Andreu	(Catalonia) CN Sabadell	13–12
2025	Palma	(Catalonia) CN Sant Andreu	(Catalonia) CN Sabadell	17–13

== Wins by teams ==
Team	Titles	Years
(Catalonia) CN Sabadell	18	(2001, 2002, 2004, 2005, 2008, 2009, 2010, 2011, 2012, 2013, 2014, 2015, 2017, 2018, 2019, 2020, 2021, 2023).
(Catalonia) CE Mediterrani	5	(1997, 1998, 1999, 2000, 2003).
(Community of Madrid) CN Ondarreta Alcorcón	2	(2006, 2007).
(Catalonia) CN Mataró	2	(2016, 2022).
(Catalonia) CN Sant Andreu	2	(2024, 2025).

== See also ==
- División de Honor Femenina
- Supercopa de España
