= CN Alcorcón =

- Founded: 1989
- Folded: 2011
- League: 2010–11, División de Honor, 10th
- Based in: Alcorcón
- Colors
- Championships: 1 Spanish league 2 Spanish cups

Club de Natación Alcorcón was a Spanish swimming and water polo club from Alcorcón, Madrid founded in 1989. Its women's team won both the national championship and the national cup, and it took part in the European Cup, reaching the quarter-finals in 2010. Later that year the club collapsed financially and it was excluded from competition. A new club was subsequently created, CN Ciudad de Alcorcón.

== Titles ==
- División de Honor (1)
  - 2006
- Copa de la Reina (2)
  - 2006, 2007
