= Cristina Rey =

Spanish swimmer

Personal information
- Born: April 2, 1976 (age 50)

Sport
- Sport: Swimming
- Strokes: Backstroke

Cristina Rey (born 2 April 1976) is a Spanish backstroke swimmer who competed in the 1992 Summer Olympics.
