= Helena Lloret =

Spanish water polo player (born 1992)

Personal information
- Full name: Helena Lloret Gómez
- Nationality: Spanish
- Born: 25 June 1992 (age 34) Barcelona
- Height: 1.68 m (5 ft 6 in)
- Weight: 62 kg (137 lb)

Sport
- Sport: Water polo
- Position: Wing
- Current club: CN Mataró
- Number: 6
National team
- Years: Team
- 2010—: Spain
Medal record
World Championships
Silver medal – second place	2017 Budapest	Team
European Championships
Bronze medal – third place	2018 Barcelona	Team
World Cup
Bronze medal – third place	2014 Khanty-Mansiysk
Europa Cup
Bronze medal – third place	2018 Pontevedra
Mediterranean Games
Gold medal – first place	2018 Tarragona	Team

Helena Lloret Gómez (born 25 June 1992) is a Spanish water polo player who won the silver medal at the 2017 World Championshipsin Budapest.

In 2018 she won the gold medal at the Mediterranean Games in Tarragona and the bronze at the European Water Polo Championship in Barcelona.

== See also ==
- List of World Aquatics Championships medalists in water polo
