= Lisa Gibson =

British water polo player

Personal information
- Born: 12 August 1989 (age 36); Chichester, Great Britain

Sport
- Sport: Water polo

Lisa Gibson (born 12 August 1989) is a British water polo player. She competed for Great Britain in the women's tournament at the 2012 Summer Olympics. This was the first ever Olympic GB women's water polo team.
