= Ciara Gibson-Byrne =

British-Spanish water polo player

Personal information
- Born: 3 December 1992 (age 32); Barcelona, Spain
- Home town: Newcastle upon Tyne, Great Britain

Sport
- Sport: Water polo

Ciara Gibson-Byrne (born 3 December 1992) is a British-Spanish water polo player playing as a right-wing.

Born in Barcelona, Spain, to British parents she began playing water polo aged 11. Gibson-Byrne made her debut for the British team as a 17-year-old in 2010 and has played for CN Mataró in the División de Honor de Waterpolo and for the City of Manchester club based in the Manchester Aquatics Centre. She played in the World League for the GB team in 2010, the World University Games in 2011 and was a member of the team which qualified for the 2012 European Championships, the first GB team to enter the games for 15 years. She scored in every game, finishing joint top British scorer on seven.

In 2012, as the youngest member of the team, she was selected to represent Great Britain in the 2012 London Olympics, the first ever Olympic GB women's water polo team. She also represented Great Britain at the 2013 World Championships and at the 2014 European Championships in Budapest, being the highest goal scorer of her team with 10 goals.

== Club career ==
She started her career in 2006, in CN Mataró. In 2010, she moved to Manchester to join Great Britain. She then returned to CN Mataró in 2012.
