= División de Honor Femenina de Waterpolo =

División de Honor
- Current season, competition or edition: 2025–26 División de Honor Femenina de Waterpolo
- Sport: water polo
- Founded: 1988
- No. of teams: 10
- Country: Spain
- Most recent champion: Mataró (2025–26)
- Most titles: CN Sabadell, 20 titles
- Broadcasters: Teledeporte, Esport3
- Level on pyramid: 1
- Relegation to: Primera División
- Domestic cup: Copa de la Reina
- Website: rfen.es

The División de Honor Femenina de Waterpolo is the premier category in the Spanish women's water polo league. Founded in 1988 as Primera División (it took the current name in 2000). It is actually contested by ten teams.

== Competition ==
=== Format ===
The División de Honor season takes place between October and May, with every team playing each other home and away for a total of 22 matches. Points are awarded according to the following:

- 3 points for a win
- 1 points for a draw

Upon completion of regular season, top four teams play championship playoffs.

=== Promotion and relegation ===
The bottom team in the standings at the end of the season is relegated to Primera División, while the top team from Primera División is promoted.

== List of champions ==
Season	Champion
1987/88	Molins de Rei (1)
1988/89	Catalunya (1)
1989/90	Mediterrani (1)
1990–91	Catalunya (2)
1991–92	Mediterrani (2)
1992–93	Mediterrani (3)
1993–94	Mediterrani (4)
1994–95	Mediterrani (5)
1995–96	Mediterrani (6)
1996–97	Mediterrani (7)
1997–98	Mediterrani (8)
1998–99	Mediterrani (9)
1999–00	Sabadell (1)
2000–01	Sabadell (2)
2001–02	Sabadell (3)
2002–03	Mediterrani (10)

Season	Champion
2003–04	Sabadell (4)
2004–05	Sabadell (5)
2005–06	Alcorcón (1)
2006–07	Sabadell (6)
2007–08	Sabadell (7)
2008–09	Sabadell (8)
2009–10	Mediterrani (11)
2010–11	Sabadell (9)
2011–12	Sabadell (10)
2012–13	Sabadell (11)
2013–14	Sabadell (12)
2014–15	Sabadell (13)
2015–16	Sabadell (14)
2016–17	Sabadell (15)
2017–18	Sabadell (16)
2018–19	Sabadell (17)

Season	Champion
2019–20	Mataró (1)
2020–21	Sabadell (18)
2021–22	Sabadell (19)
2022–23	Sabadell (20)
2023–24	Mataró (2)
2024–25	Sabadell (21)
2025–26	Mataró (3)

== Titles by team ==
Titles	Team	Season
21	Sabadell	1999–00, 2000–01, 2001–02, 2003–04, 2004–05, 2006–07, 2007–08, 2008–09, 2010–11, 2011–12, 2012–13, 2013–14, 2014–15, 2015–16, 2016–17, 2017–18, 2018–19, 2020–21, 2021–22, 2022–23, 2024–25
11	Mediterrani	1989–90, 1991–92, 1992–93, 1993–94, 1994–95, 1995–96, 1996–97, 1997–98, 1998–99, 2002–03, 2009–10
3	Mataró	2019–20, 2023–24, 2025–26
2	Catalunya	1988–89, 1990–91
1	Molins de Rei	1987–88
1	Alcorcón	2005–06

== See also ==
- Copa de la Reina
- Supercopa de España
