= EW Zaragoza =

Spanish water polo club

- Founded: 1984
- League: División de Honor Femenina
- Based in: Zaragoza
- Arena: Piscina del Stadium Casablanca
- Colors
- President: Vicente Rubio
- Head coach: Francisco Orizo
- Website: https://www.ewpz.blogspot.com/

Escuela Waterpolo Zaragoza, also known simply as EWZ, is a Spanish water polo club from Zaragoza established in 1984. It is best known for its women's team, which has played in the División de Honor Femenina since 2004. It has also played the LEN Trophy.
