= Andrea Blas =

Spanish water polo player (born 1992)

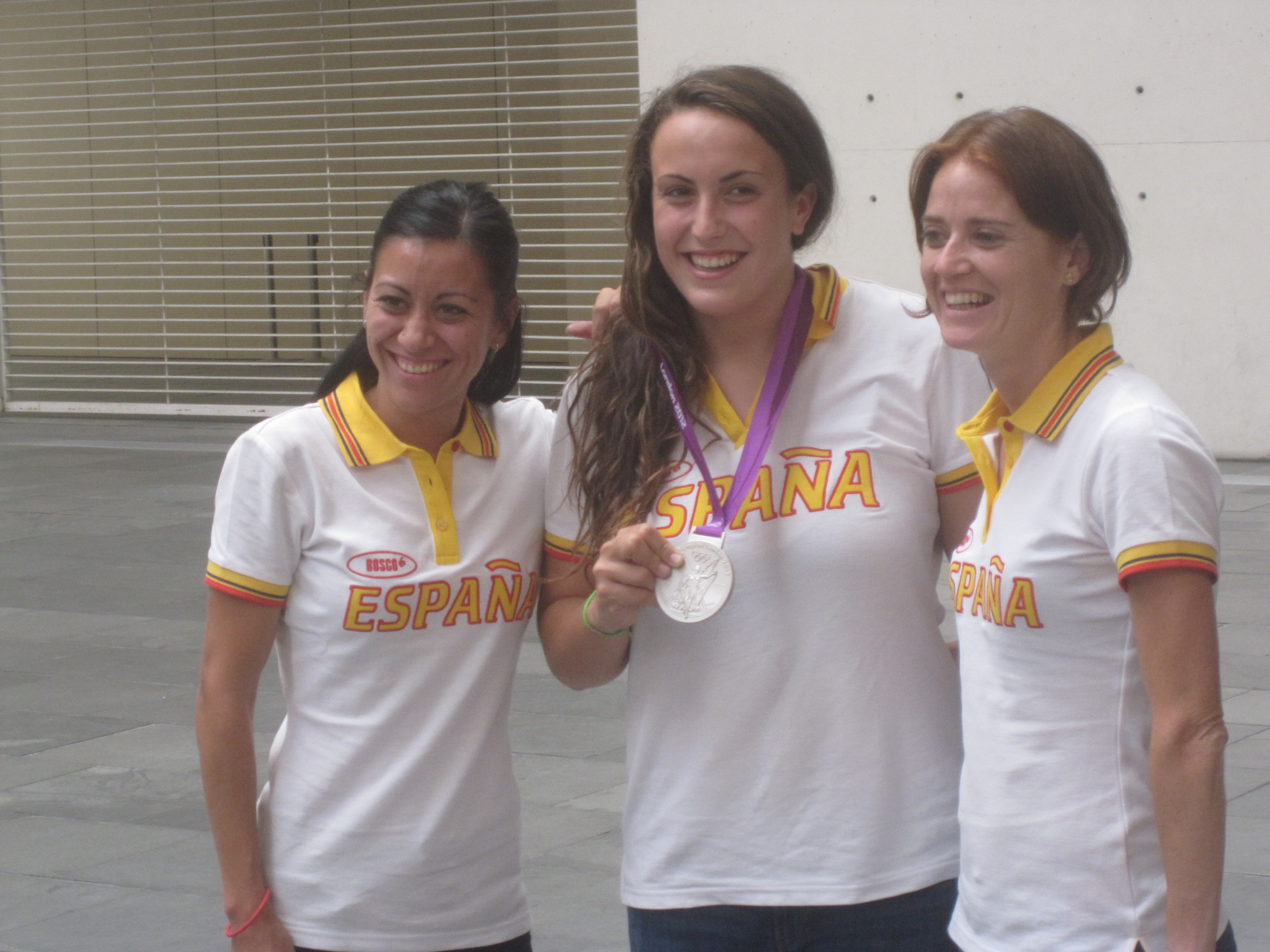
- Blas (center) wearing the Olympic silver medal

Personal information
- Full name: Andrea Blas Martinez
- Born: 14 February 1992 (age 34) Zaragoza, Spain
- Height: 173 cm (5 ft 8 in)
- Weight: 81 kg (179 lb)
Medal record
Women's water polo
Representing Spain
Olympic Games
Silver medal – second place	2012 London	Team
World Championships
Gold medal – first place	2013 Barcelona	Team
European Championships
Gold medal – first place	2014 Budapest	Team

Andrea Blas Martinez (born 14 February 1992 in Zaragoza) is a Spanish water polo player. At the 2012 Summer Olympics, she competed for the Spain women's national water polo team in the women's event, where they won the silver medal. She was also part of the Spanish team that won the World Championships in 2013, held in Barcelona.

== Personal life ==
She is 5 ft 8 inches tall.

== See also ==
- List of Olympic medalists in water polo (women)
- List of world champions in women's water polo
- List of World Aquatics Championships medalists in water polo
