= CW Dos Hermanas =

Spanish water polo club

Dos Hermanas
- Founded: 1993
- League: División de Honor Femenina
- Based in: Dos Hermanas
- Arena: Piscina CMAD Montequinto
- Colors
- President: Ana Aretxabaleta
- Manager: José Juan Murube
- Website: http://www.waterpolo2h.com/

Club Waterpolo Dos Hermanas, also known as Dos Hermanas Emasesa for sponsorship reasons, is a Spanish water polo club from Dos Hermanas, province of Seville established in 1993. It is best known for its women's team, which has played in the División de Honor since 2009. In 2011 it made its debut in the LEN Trophy.
