= CN Catalunya =

Swimming club

Catalunya
- Founded: 1931
- League: División de Honor
- Arena: Pau Negre, Barcelona, Spain
- Colors
- Championships: 1 European Cup; 2 Cup Winners' Cups; 2 European Supercups; 7 Spanish Leagues; 6 Spanish Cups
- Website: cncatalunya.cat

Club Natació Catalunya is a Spanish swimming and water polo club from Barcelona established in 1931. It also has athletics, squash and triathlon sections.

Catalunya's golden era started in 1987, winning the national cup and reaching the Cup Winners' Cup's final, lost to Mornar Split. It lasted through the first half of the 1990s, winning the 1992 Cup Winners' Cup and the 1995 European Cup. It also reached the European Cup's final in 1989 and 1994, losing to Spandau 04 and Újpesti TE. In 1997 and 1998 it won its sixth national cup and its seventh national championships, its last titles to date. Its women's team also won two championship in 1989 and 1991.

== Titles ==
- Men:
  - European Cup (1)
    - 1995
  - Cup Winners' Cup (1)
    - 1992
  - European Supercups (2)
    - 1992, 1995
  - División de Honor (8)
    - 1988, 1989, 1990, 1992, 1993, 1994, 1998
  - Copa del Rey (7)
    - 1987, 1988, 1990, 1992, 1994, 1997
- Women:
  - División de Honor (2)
    - 1989, 1991
