= Jennifer Pareja =

Spanish water polo player (born 1984)

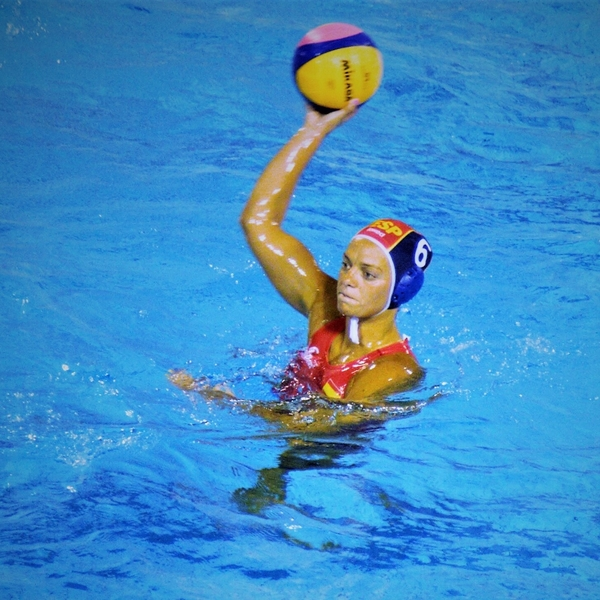

Personal information
- Full name: Jennifer Pareja Lisalde
- Nickname: Jenny
- Born: 8 May 1984 (age 42) Olot, Girona, Spain
- Height: 1.75 m (5 ft 9 in)
- Weight: 63 kg (139 lb)

Sport
- Sport: Water polo
- Position: Driver
- Current club: Retired
- Number: 6
National team
- Years: Team
- 2000–2016: Spain
Medal record
Olympic Games
Silver medal – second place	2012 London	Team
World Championships
Gold medal – first place	2013 Barcelona	Team
European Championships
Gold medal – first place	2014 Budapest	Team
Silver medal – second place	2008 Malaga	Team

Jennifer Pareja Lisalde (born 8 May 1984) is a former Spanish water polo player who won the gold medal at the 2013 World Championships in Barcelona, being named Most Valuable Player of the event.

She was named 2013 Best Female Water Polo Player of the Year by FINA.

Pareja competed at the 2012 Summer Olympics with the Spain national team in the women's event, winning the silver medal. She scored 12 goals and was named to the Olympic All-Star Team. She was the joint top sprinter at the 2012 Olympics, with 21 sprints won.

In 2014 she also won gold at European Championship in Budapest.

== See also ==
- Spain women's Olympic water polo team records and statistics
- List of Olympic medalists in water polo (women)
- List of world champions in women's water polo
- List of World Aquatics Championships medalists in water polo

== Notes ==
Awards
Preceded by (United States) Maggie Steffens	FINA Water Polo Player of the Year	Succeeded by (United States) Maggie Steffens

Awards
Preceded by (Spain) Anni Espar	LEN Water Polo Player of the Year	Succeeded by (Spain) Maica García
