= CN Terrassa =

Catalan sports club

- Founded: 1932
- League: División de Honor (M); División de Honor (W)
- Based in: Terrassa
- Arena: Área Olímpica
- Colors
- President: Rafael Clares
- Head coach: Daniel Nart/Dídac Cobacho/Xavier Pérez
- Website: http://www.elnatacio.com/

Club Natació Terrassa is a Catalan sports club from Terrassa, Catalonia. It was founded in 1932 as a water polo and swimming club, and later created athletics, basketball, field hockey, figure skating, frontenis, football, football tennis, judo, karate, mountaineering, padel tennis, triathlon and valencian pilota sections.

The men's and women's water polo play in the Spanish premier championships; the male team has played regularly the LEN Trophy, while the female team made its debut in the División de Honor in 2010. The swimming section has provided three swimmers for the Summer Olympics between the 1980 and 2004 editions: Natalia Más, Cristina Rey and Laura Roca.
