= CN Sabadell =

Catalan aquatic sports club

- Founded: 1916
- League: División de Honor (M); División de Honor (W)
- Based in: Sabadell
- Arena: Piscina Can Llong
- Colors
- President: Claudi Martí
- Head coach: Joaquim Colet (M); David Palma (W)
- Championships: Women's Water Polo: 7 Champions' Cup; 4 LEN Super Cup; 20 Spanish Leagues; 18 Spanish Cups; 12 Spanish Super Cups; Men's Water Polo: 1 LEN Euro Cup; 3 Spanish Cups; 4 Spanish Super Cups
- Website: nataciosabadell.com

Club Natació Sabadell is a Spanish aquatic sports club from Sabadell, Catalonia, Spain.

Founded in 1916, it is best known for its professional women's water polo team, which has been the most successful team in the national championship in recent years, with nine titles since 2000. In 2011, it won the European Cup, becoming the first Spanish team to do so. The men's team won its third national cup in 2012.

The Club brought the most athletes to the Summer Olympics in London in 2012, a total of 8. These included six members of the women's water polo team who gained silver medals: Laura Ester, Anna Espar, Matilde Ortiz, Jennifer Pareja, Pilar Peña Carrasco and Maica García Godoy. Mireia Belmonte García, a silver medalist in London 2012, is the most prolific swimmer of this club.

== Titles ==
- Women's Water Polo:
  - LEN Champions' Cup / LEN Euro League Women / LEN Champions League Women: 7
    - 2011, 2013, 2014, 2016, 2019, 2023, 2024
  - LEN Super Cup: 4
    - 2013, 2014, 2016, 2023
  - Spanish League: 20
    - 2000, 2001, 2002, 2004, 2005, 2007, 2008, 2009, 2011, 2012, 2013, 2014, 2015, 2016, 2017, 2018, 2019, 2021, 2022, 2023
  - Spanish Cup: 18
    - 2001, 2002, 2004, 2005, 2008, 2009, 2010, 2011, 2012, 2013, 2014, 2015, 2017, 2018, 2019, 2020, 2021, 2023
  - Spanish Supercup: 12
    - 2009, 2010, 2011, 2012, 2013, 2014, 2015, 2016, 2017, 2018, 2020, 2023
- Men's Water Polo:
  - LEN Euro Cup: 1
    - 2022
  - Spanish Cup: 3
    - 1998, 2005, 2012
  - Spanish Supercup: 4
    - 2002, 2005, 2012, 2020
