= CE Mediterrani =

Sports club in Barcelona

Mediterrani
- Founded: 3 July 1931
- League: División de Honor (M); División de Honor (W)
- Based in: Barcelona
- Stadium: Instal.lació Josep Vallès
- Colors
- President: Álex Almeda Guerrero
- Head coach: Jahzeel Martínez Espejo (M); Marian Díaz Lizaran (W)
- Championships: W: 11 Spanish leagues 5 Spanish cups 1 Catalan Cup; M: 1 Spanish cup
- Website: clubesportiumediterrani.com

Club Esportiu Mediterrani is a sports club founded in 1931 by a group of sports enthusiasts in particular Swimming, who frequented the beach of Barceloneta and the swimming baths located in the delightful seaside neighborhood of Barcelona. They practice several sports, but mainly swimming and water polo.

The men's team enjoyed its peak between 1992 and 1994. In addition to chaining three national subchampionships, it won the 1993 national cup and it reached the 1994 LEN Cup Winners' Cup's final, lost to ASP Pescara. On the other hand, the women's team dominated the national championship through the 1990s with eight titles in a row.

== Titles ==
=== Male team ===
- Copa del Rey (1)
  - 1993

=== Women's team ===
- División de Honor (11)
  - 1990, 1992, 1993, 1994, 1995, 1996, 1997, 1998, 1999, 2003, 2010
- Copa de la Reina (5)
  - 1997, 1998, 1999, 2000, 2003
- Copa Catalunya (1)
  - 2008
