= CN Mataró =

- Founded: 1932
- League: División de Honor (M); División de Honor (W)
- Based in: Mataró
- Arena: Piscina CN Mataró
- Colors
- President: Francesc Casabella
- Head coach: Dani Ballart (W)
- Website: cnmataro.cat

Centre Natació Mataró is a Catalan sports club from Mataró, Barcelona created in 1932. It is active in swimming, water polo, table tennis and triathlon. The men's and women's water polo teams play in the División de Honor Masculina and the División de Honor Femenina respectively. The male team played LEN competitions for the first time in the 2003–04 LEN Trophy, while the female team made its debut in the 2009–10 LEN Trophy.

The women's table tennis section has also represented Spain in the ETTU Cup.

== Titles ==
- Women Water Polo:
  - LEN Trophy: 1
    - 2016
  - Copa de la Reina: 2
    - 2016, 2022
  - Spanish Supercup: 3
    - 2019, 2021, 2022

== Squads ==
=== Water polo ===
- Men's team
  - Mario Lloret, Ramiro Veich, Marc Vera, Marc Corbalán, Óscar Aguilar, Eduard Minguez, Max Casabella, Pol Daura, Alex Codina, Víctor Fernández, Gustavo Guimarães, Germán Yáñez, Marc Pannon, Pau Campos.
- Women's team
  - Elena Sánchez, Queralt Bertran, Helena Lloret, Anna Gual, D. Jackovich, Vivian Sevenich, Clara Cambray, Chris Nogué, Marta Bach, Maria Bernabé, Anni Espar, Alejandra Aznar, Blanca Colominas, Carla Martín, Alba Bonamusa, Isabel Piralkova, Ana Aparicio.

=== Swimming ===
- Men's team
  - Pol Cantó, Chus Collado, Dani García, David Roncero, Josua Sumios, Andreu Valls.
- Women's team
  - Mireia Biel, Berta Cantó, Carla Chaves, Irene Illa, Aina Jiménez, Sara Martínez, Adriana Roca, Natàlia Torné, Aina Triola, Núria Vivas.

=== Table tennis ===
- Men's table tennis
  - Pau Nolis, Xavier Peral, Toni Prados, Yordi Jason Ramos.
- Women's table tennis
  - Liu Chang, Galia Dvorak, Natalya Prosvirnina.
