= Felipe Perrone =

Spanish water polo player (born 1986)

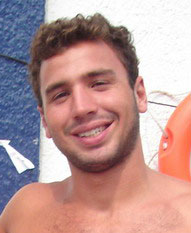

Personal information
- Full name: Felipe Perrone Rocha
- Nationality: Spanish
- Born: 27 February 1986 (age 40) Rio de Janeiro, Brazil
- Height: 182 cm (72 in)
- Weight: 88 kg (194 lb)

Sport
- Sport: Water polo
- Handedness: Right
- Position: Left drive/ Left wing
- Current club: CN Atlètic-Barceloneta
- Number: 10

Senior clubs
- Years: Team
- 2002–2005: CN Barcelona
- 2005–2007: CN Atlètic-Barceloneta
- 2007–2008: Savona
- 2008–2010: CN Atlètic-Barceloneta
- 2010–2012: Pro Recco
- 2012–2015: CN Atlètic-Barceloneta
- 2015–2017: VK Jug
- 2017–: CN Atlètic-Barceloneta
National team
- Years: Team
- 2001–2004: Brazil
- 2005–2013: Spain
- 2014–2016: Brazil
- 2018–2025: Spain
Medal record
Men's water polo
Representing Spain
World Championships
Gold medal – first place	2022 Budapest	Team
Gold medal – first place	2025 Singapore	Team
Silver medal – second place	2009 Rome	Team
Silver medal – second place	2019 Gwangju	Team
Bronze medal – third place	2007 Melbourne	Team
Bronze medal – third place	2023 Fukuoka	Team
Bronze medal – third place	2024 Doha	Team
World Cup
Gold medal – first place	2023 Los Angeles
Bronze medal – third place	2006 Budapest
Bronze medal – third place	2010 Oradea
World League
Silver medal – second place	2006 Athens
Bronze medal – third place	2018 Budapest
European Championship
Gold medal – first place	2024 Zagreb	Team
Silver medal – second place	2018 Barcelona	Team
Silver medal – second place	2020 Budapest	Team
Bronze medal – third place	2006 Belgrade	Team
Bronze medal – third place	2022 Split	Team
Mediterranean Games
Gold medal – first place	2005 Almeria	Team
Silver medal – second place	2009 Pescara	Team
Representing Brazil
World League
Bronze medal – third place	2015 Bergamo
Pan American Games
Silver medal – second place	2003 Santo Domingo	Team
Silver medal – second place	2015 Toronto	Team

Felipe Perrone Rocha (Note: In this Spanish name, the first or paternal surname is Perrone and the second or maternal family name is Rocha.) (born 27 February 1986) is a Brazilian-Spanish former water polo player. Born in Brazil, he competed for Spain from 2003 until 2013, including in the 2008 Summer Olympics and 2012 Summer Olympics. Afterwards, he competed for his birth country in the 2016 Summer Olympics, as Brazil earned its first qualifying spot in 32 years as hosts. He helped Spanish water polo club CN Atlètic-Barceloneta win the LEN Champions League in 2013–14 season. His brother Ricardo Perrone also competed for Spain in water polo.

He retired from water polo as a player after the gold-medal final game at the 2025 World Water Polo Championships held in Singapore, winning the gold medal with the Spain national team.

== Personal life ==
While playing for Jug Dubrovnik, Perrone married the Croatian Marija Pecotić from Brna on the island of Korčula.

== Honours ==
=== Club ===
CN Barcelona

- LEN Euro Cup: 2003–04
- Spanish Championship: 2003–04, 2004–05
- Copa del Rey: 2002–03

CN Atlètic-Barceloneta

- LEN Champions League: 2013–14
- LEN Super Cup: 2014
- Spanish Championship: 2005–06, 2006–07, 2008–09, 2009–10, 2012–13, 2013–14, 2014–15, 2017–18, 2018–19, 2019–20, 2020–21, 2021–22, 2022–23
- Copa del Rey: 2005–06, 2006–07, 2008–09, 2009–10, 2012–13, 2013–14, 2014–15, 2017–18, 2018–19, 2019–20, 2020–21, 2021–22, 2022–23, 2023–24
- Supercopa de España: 2006, 2007, 2009, 2010, 2013, 2015, 2018, 2019
- Copa de Cataluña: 2006–07, 2008–09, 2009–10, 2012–13, 2013–14, 2014–15

Pro Recco

- LEN Champions League: 2011–12; runners-up: 2010–11
- LEN Super Cup: 2012
- Serie A1: 2010–11, 2011–12
- Coppa Italia: 2010–11
- Adriatic League: 2011–12

Jug Dubrovnik

- LEN Champions League: 2015–16; runners-up: 2016–17
- LEN Super Cup: 2016
- Croatian Championship: 2015–16, 2016–17
- Croatian Cup: 2015–16, 2016–17
- Adriatic League: 2015–16, 2016–17

== Awards ==
- FINA "World Player of the Year" award: 2022
- Total-waterpolo magazine's man water polo "World Player of the Year" award: 2018
- Member of the Second World Team of the Year's 2010–20 by total-waterpolo
- Member of World Team 2018, 2023 by total-waterpolo
- Olympic Games 2008 Team of the Tournament
- Olympic Games 2012 Team of the Tournament
- World League MVP: 2012 Almaty
- Adriatic League MVP: 2015–16 with Jug Dubrovnik
- Adriatic League Top Scorer: 2015–16 with Jug Dubrovnik
- LEN Champions League Top Scorer (2): 2012–13 with Atlètic-Barceloneta, 2016–17 with Jug Dubrovnik
- LEN Champions Final Six MVP (2): 2015 with Atlètic-Barceloneta, 2016 with Jug Dubrovnik
- LEN Champions League MVP: 2016–17
- LEN Champions League Left Driver of the Year (3): 2015–16, 2016–17 with Jug Dubrovnik, 2022–23 with Atlètic-Barceloneta
- Spanish Championship MVP (4): 2005–06 2009–10, 2012–13, 2020–21 with Atlètic-Barceloneta
- World Championship Team of the Tournament: 2023

== See also ==
- Spain men's Olympic water polo team records and statistics
- List of men's Olympic water polo tournament top goalscorers
- List of World Aquatics Championships medalists in water polo
