= 2012–13 División de Honor de Waterpolo =

División de Honor 2012–13
- League: División de Honor
- Sport: Water polo
- Duration: October 2012–April 13, 2013 (regular season); April 20–May 25 (championship playoff)
- Teams: 12
- League champions: Atlètic-Barceloneta
- Runners-up: Sabadell
- Top scorer: Joel Esteller, 79 goals
- Relegated to 1ª División: CN Montjuïc

División de Honor seasons
- ← 2011–12 2013–14 →

The 2012–13 season of the División de Honor de Waterpolo is the 90th season of top-tier water polo in Spain since its inception in 1925.

The season comprises regular season and championship playoff. Regular season started in October 2012 and will finish on April 13, 2013. Top eight team at standings play championship playoff.

Championship playoff will begin a week later with semifinals, playing the final around late May.

Atlètic-Barceloneta was the defending champions and will remain so for next season (2013–14) after defeating Sabadell 3–1 in the Championship Final.

== Teams ==
División de Honor de Waterpolo 2012–13 teams

Team	City/Area	Founded	Stadium	website
Atlètic-Barceloneta	Barcelona	1913 (1992)	Piscina Sant Sebastià	
Sabadell	Sabadell	1916	Can Llong	
Terrassa	Terrassa	1932	Àrea Olímpica	
Real Canoe–Isostar	Madrid	1931	Piscina Real Canoe	
Mataró Quadis	Mataró	1932	Instal·lacions CN Mataró	
Mediterrani	Barcelona	1931	Instal·lació Josep Vallès	
Waterpolo Navarra	Pamplona	2006	Ciudad Deportiva Amaya	
Sant Andreu	Barcelona	1971	Piscina Pere Serrat	
Barcelona	Barcelona	1907	Nova Escullera	
Catalunya	Barcelona	1931	Piscina Sant Jordi	
Montjuïc	Barcelona	1944	Piscina CN Montjuïc	
Helios	Zaragoza	1925	Piscina Stadium Casablanca	

== Regular season standings ==
	Team	P	W	D	L	GF	GA	GD	Pts
1	Atlètic-Barceloneta	22	21	0	1	287	131	156	63
2	Sabadell	22	18	0	4	280	173	107	54
3	Terrassa	22	16	0	6	233	165	68	48
4	Barcelona	22	13	1	8	214	168	45	40
5	Real Canoe–Isostar	22	11	3	8	225	172	53	36
6	Mediterrani	22	10	2	10	210	187	23	32
7	Waterpolo Navarra	22	10	0	12	187	208	−21	30
8	Mataró Quadis	22	9	2	11	192	172	20	29
9	Sant Andreu	22	8	4	11	197	200	−3	27
10	Catalunya	22	7	3	12	181	215	−34	24
11	Helios	22	1	0	21	138	305	−167	3
12	Montjuïc	22	1	0	21	102	350	−248	3

Championship playoffs
Relegation playoff
Relegated

== Championship playoffs ==
Quarterfinals (best of 3)
1	Atlètic-Barceloneta	13	17
8	Mataró Quadis	3	5
4	Barcelona	7	8
5	Real Canoe-Isostar	9	9
2	Sabadell	17	11
7	Waterpolo Navarra	6	8
3	Terrassa	13	8	7
6	Mediterrani	8	9	8

Semifinals (best of 3)
1	Atlètic-Barceloneta	11	14
5	Real Canoe-Isostar	6	9
2	Sabadell	15	12
6	Mediterrani	6	5

Final (best of 5)
1	Atlètic-Barceloneta	13	6	8	10
2	Sabadell	10	9	7	7

=== Quarter-finals ===
==== 1st leg ====
April 20; 12:45 (UTC+2)	Report	Mataró Quadis	3–13	Atlètic-Barceloneta	Piscines Joan Serra, Mataró; Referees: Santander Lopéz, Baños Martínez
April 20; 12:45 (UTC+2)	Report	Score by quarters: 0–4, 2–3, 1–2, 0–4			Piscines Joan Serra, Mataró; Referees: Santander Lopéz, Baños Martínez
April 20; 12:45 (UTC+2)	Report	Babay 3	Goals	Perrone 4	Piscines Joan Serra, Mataró; Referees: Santander Lopéz, Baños Martínez

April 20; 16:00 (UTC+2)	Report	Mediterrani	8–13	Terrassa	Instal.lació Josep Vallès, Barcelona; Referees: Jaumandreu Sellarès, Felicidad Rodríguez
April 20; 16:00 (UTC+2)	Report	Score by quarters: 2–4, 3–3, 2–3, 1–3			Instal.lació Josep Vallès, Barcelona; Referees: Jaumandreu Sellarès, Felicidad Rodríguez
April 20; 16:00 (UTC+2)	Report	Yáñez 2	Goals	Aguilar 4	Instal.lació Josep Vallès, Barcelona; Referees: Jaumandreu Sellarès, Felicidad Rodríguez

April 20; 18:00 (UTC+2)	Report	Real Canoe-Isostar	9–7 (OT)	Barcelona	Piscina Real Canoe, Madrid; Referees: Teixidó Bermúdez, Moreno Cuervas
April 20; 18:00 (UTC+2)	Report	Score by quarters: 3–2, 1–1, 0–2, 3–2 OT: 2–0			Piscina Real Canoe, Madrid; Referees: Teixidó Bermúdez, Moreno Cuervas
April 20; 18:00 (UTC+2)	Report	Mario García 4	Goals	Balatoni 3	Piscina Real Canoe, Madrid; Referees: Teixidó Bermúdez, Moreno Cuervas

April 20; 19:30 (UTC+2)	Report	Waterpolo Navarra	6–17	Sabadell	Ciudad Deportiva Amaya, Pamplona; Referees: Cabello López, Ortega Carreras
April 20; 19:30 (UTC+2)	Report	Score by quarters: 1–4, 2–3, 1–4, 2–6			Ciudad Deportiva Amaya, Pamplona; Referees: Cabello López, Ortega Carreras
April 20; 19:30 (UTC+2)	Report	six players 1	Goals	Ivanov 5	Ciudad Deportiva Amaya, Pamplona; Referees: Cabello López, Ortega Carreras

==== 2nd leg ====
April 24; 20:30 (UTC+2)	Report	Atlètic-Barceloneta	17–5	Mataró Quadis	Piscines de Sant Sebastià, Barcelona; Referees: Guardia Marsal, Román Eufemia
April 24; 20:30 (UTC+2)	Report	Score by quarters: 5–2, 2–1, 5–1, 5–1			Piscines de Sant Sebastià, Barcelona; Referees: Guardia Marsal, Román Eufemia
April 24; 20:30 (UTC+2)	Report	Perrone 4	Goals	Corbalán 2	Piscines de Sant Sebastià, Barcelona; Referees: Guardia Marsal, Román Eufemia

Atlètic-Barceloneta won series 2–0 and advanced to Semifinals.

April 24; 20:30 (UTC+2)	Report	Barcelona	8–9 (OT)	Real Canoe-Isostar	Piscina Nova Escullera, Barcelona; Referees: Borrell Sánchez, Gómez Pordomingo
April 24; 20:30 (UTC+2)	Report	Score by quarters: 3–2, 1–2, 2–2, 2–2 OT: 0–1			Piscina Nova Escullera, Barcelona; Referees: Borrell Sánchez, Gómez Pordomingo
April 24; 20:30 (UTC+2)	Report	three players 2	Goals	Barroso, M. García 3	Piscina Nova Escullera, Barcelona; Referees: Borrell Sánchez, Gómez Pordomingo

Real Canoe-Isostar won series 2–0 and advanced to Semifinals.

April 24; 20:45 (UTC+2)	Report	Sabadell	11–8	Waterpolo Navarra	Piscina Can Llong, Sabadell; Referees: Moliner Molins, Torres Pérez
April 24; 20:45 (UTC+2)	Report	Score by quarters: 2–1, 2–2, 2–1, 5–4			Piscina Can Llong, Sabadell; Referees: Moliner Molins, Torres Pérez
April 24; 20:45 (UTC+2)	Report	Echenique 5	Goals	Artola 4	Piscina Can Llong, Sabadell; Referees: Moliner Molins, Torres Pérez

Sabadell won series 2–0 and advanced to Semifinals.

April 24; 20:45 (UTC+2)	Report	Terrassa	8–9	Mediterrani	Piscina Àrea Olímpica, Terrassa; Referees: Teule Barreda, Galindo Moreno
April 24; 20:45 (UTC+2)	Report	Score by quarters: 4–2, 2–3, 1–1, 1–3			Piscina Àrea Olímpica, Terrassa; Referees: Teule Barreda, Galindo Moreno
April 24; 20:45 (UTC+2)	Report	Mora 3	Goals	Carabí, D. González	Piscina Àrea Olímpica, Terrassa; Referees: Teule Barreda, Galindo Moreno

==== 3rd leg ====
April 27; 18:00 (UTC+2)	Report	Terrassa	7–8	Mediterrani	Piscina Àrea Olímpica, Terrassa; Referees: Iñesta Peralta, Torres Pérez
April 27; 18:00 (UTC+2)	Report	Score by quarters: 0–2, 2–1, 3–3, 2–2			Piscina Àrea Olímpica, Terrassa; Referees: Iñesta Peralta, Torres Pérez
April 27; 18:00 (UTC+2)	Report	J. Pérez 3	Goals	Yáñez 4	Piscina Àrea Olímpica, Terrassa; Referees: Iñesta Peralta, Torres Pérez

Mediterrani won series 2–1 and advanced to Semifinals.

=== Semifinals ===
==== 1st leg ====
May 4; 13:30 (UTC+2)	Report	Mediterrani	6–15	Sabadell	Instal.lació Josep Vallès, Barcelona; Referees: Teule Barreda, Galindo Moreno
May 4; 13:30 (UTC+2)	Report	Score by quarters: 1–3, 1–3, 2–3, 2–6			Instal.lació Josep Vallès, Barcelona; Referees: Teule Barreda, Galindo Moreno
May 4; 13:30 (UTC+2)	Report	Schwimer 2	Goals	three players 3	Instal.lació Josep Vallès, Barcelona; Referees: Teule Barreda, Galindo Moreno

May 4; 18:00 (UTC+2)	Report	Real Canoe-Isostar	6–11	Atlètic-Barceloneta	Piscina Real Canoe, Madrid; Referees: Jaumandreu Sellarès, Piñero Martínez
May 4; 18:00 (UTC+2)	Report	Score by quarters: 3–2, 2–3, 0–3, 1–3			Piscina Real Canoe, Madrid; Referees: Jaumandreu Sellarès, Piñero Martínez
May 4; 18:00 (UTC+2)	Report	Barroso 4	Goals	Perrone 5	Piscina Real Canoe, Madrid; Referees: Jaumandreu Sellarès, Piñero Martínez

==== 2nd leg ====
May 8; 20:30 (UTC+2)	Report	Atlètic-Barceloneta	14–9	Real Canoe-Isostar	Piscines de Sant Sebastià, Barcelona; Referees: Sánchez Molina, Gómez Pordomingo
May 8; 20:30 (UTC+2)	Report	Score by quarters: 4–2, 5–1, 1–3, 4–3			Piscines de Sant Sebastià, Barcelona; Referees: Sánchez Molina, Gómez Pordomingo
May 8; 20:30 (UTC+2)	Report	Roca 3	Goals	Carpeño 3	Piscines de Sant Sebastià, Barcelona; Referees: Sánchez Molina, Gómez Pordomingo

Atlètic-Barceloneta won series 2–0 and advanced to Final.

May 8; 20:45 (UTC+2)	Report	Sabadell	12–5	Mediterrani	Piscina Can Llong, Sabadell; Referees: Cabello López, Verdejo Domingo
May 8; 20:45 (UTC+2)	Report	Score by quarters: 2–0, 4–1, 4–2, 2–2			Piscina Can Llong, Sabadell; Referees: Cabello López, Verdejo Domingo
May 8; 20:45 (UTC+2)	Report	Estrany 4	Goals	Ferrer 2	Piscina Can Llong, Sabadell; Referees: Cabello López, Verdejo Domingo

Sabadell won series 2–0 and advanced to Final.

=== Final ===
==== 1st leg ====
May 15; 20:30 (UTC+2)	Report	Atlètic-Barceloneta	13–10	Sabadell	Piscines de Sant Sebastià, Barcelona; Referees: Borrell Sánchez, Iñesta Peralta
May 15; 20:30 (UTC+2)	Report	Score by quarters: 2–3, 4–2, 3–2, 4–3			Piscines de Sant Sebastià, Barcelona; Referees: Borrell Sánchez, Iñesta Peralta
May 15; 20:30 (UTC+2)	Report	F. Fernández 3	Goals	Echenique, Estrany 4	Piscines de Sant Sebastià, Barcelona; Referees: Borrell Sánchez, Iñesta Peralta

==== 2nd leg ====
May 18; 12:30 (UTC+2)	Report	Atlètic-Barceloneta	6–9	Sabadell	Piscines de Sant Sebastià, Barcelona; Referees: Moliner Molins, Moreno Cuervas
May 18; 12:30 (UTC+2)	Report	Score by quarters: 1–3, 2–3, 3–1, 0–2			Piscines de Sant Sebastià, Barcelona; Referees: Moliner Molins, Moreno Cuervas
May 18; 12:30 (UTC+2)	Report	de Lera 2	Goals	Ivanov 4	Piscines de Sant Sebastià, Barcelona; Referees: Moliner Molins, Moreno Cuervas

==== 3rd leg ====
May 22; 21:00 (UTC+2)	Report	Sabadell	7–8 (OT)	Atlètic-Barceloneta	Piscina Can Llong, Sabadell; Referees: Fernández de Cuevas Cote, Martín Lozano
May 22; 21:00 (UTC+2)	Report	Score by quarters: 0–1, 2–1, 2–0, 2–4 OT: 1–2			Piscina Can Llong, Sabadell; Referees: Fernández de Cuevas Cote, Martín Lozano
May 22; 21:00 (UTC+2)	Report	Carrillo, Krumpholz 2	Goals	Minguell, Petković	Piscina Can Llong, Sabadell; Referees: Fernández de Cuevas Cote, Martín Lozano

==== 4th leg ====
May 25; 12:45 (UTC+2)	Report	Sabadell	7–10	Atlètic-Barceloneta	Piscina Can Llong, Sabadell; Referees: Moliner Molins, Iñesta Peralta
May 25; 12:45 (UTC+2)	Report	Score by quarters: 2–4, 2–2, 2–3, 1–1			Piscina Can Llong, Sabadell; Referees: Moliner Molins, Iñesta Peralta
May 25; 12:45 (UTC+2)	Report	Carrillo, Vallès 2	Goals	Perrone 5	Piscina Can Llong, Sabadell; Referees: Moliner Molins, Iñesta Peralta

Atlètic-Barceloneta won Championship final series 3–1.

2012–13 División de Honor winners
(Catalonia)
Atlètic-Barceloneta
Thirteenth title

==== Individual awards ====
- Championship MVP: (Spain) Felipe Perrone, CN Atlètic-Barceloneta
- Best Goalkeeper: (Spain) Iñaki Aguilar, CN Sabadell
- Top goalscorer: (Spain) Joel Esteller, CN Barcelona

== Relegation playoff ==
Playoff to be played in two legs. First leg to be played on 4 May and 2nd leg on 11 May. The overall winner will play in División de Honor 2013–14 and the loser one in Primera Nacional.

Team 1	Agg.	Team 2	1st leg	2nd leg
Helios (Aragon)	23–20	(Canary Islands) Acuasport Tenerife-Echeyde	14–14	9–6

=== 1st leg ===
May 4; 19:00 (UTC+1)	Report	Acuasport Tenerife-Echeyde	14–14	Helios	Piscina Municipal, Santa Cruz; Referees: Fernández Escola, Jiménez Turnes
May 4; 19:00 (UTC+1)	Report	Score by quarters: 4–2, 5–4, 3–3, 2–5			Piscina Municipal, Santa Cruz; Referees: Fernández Escola, Jiménez Turnes
May 4; 19:00 (UTC+1)	Report	Silva, JP Sánchez 5	Goals	Garriga 4	Piscina Municipal, Santa Cruz; Referees: Fernández Escola, Jiménez Turnes

=== 2nd leg ===
May 11; 18:00 (UTC+2)	Report	Helios	9–6	Acuasport Tenerife-Echeyde	Piscina Stadium Casablanca, Zaragoza; Referees: Colominas Ezponda, Cisneros Horrillo
May 11; 18:00 (UTC+2)	Report	Score by quarters: 3–1, 2–2, 2–2, 2–1			Piscina Stadium Casablanca, Zaragoza; Referees: Colominas Ezponda, Cisneros Horrillo
May 11; 18:00 (UTC+2)	Report	Mijanović 3	Goals	Silva 3	Piscina Stadium Casablanca, Zaragoza; Referees: Colominas Ezponda, Cisneros Horrillo

Helios won series 2–0 and remained in División de Honor.

== Top goal scorers ==
(regular season only)

Player	Goals	Team
(Spain) Joel Esteller	79	CN Barcelona
(Spain) Óscar Carrillo	52	CN Sabadell
(Spain) Gonzalo Echenique	51	CN Sabadell
(Argentina) Germán Yánez	50	CE Mediterrani
(Spain) Sergi Mora	50	CN Terrassa
(Hungary) Árpád Babay	47	CN Mataró Quadis
(Spain) Mario García	46	Real Canoe-Isostar
(Montenegro) Nikola Mijanović	43	CN Helios
(Spain) Óscar Aguilar	43	CN Terrassa
(Spain) Xavier Vallès	41	CN Sabadell

== See also ==
- 2012–13 División de Honor Femenina de Waterpolo
