= 2011–12 División de Honor de Waterpolo =

División de Honor 2011–12
- League: División de Honor
- Sport: Water polo
- Duration: October 2011–May 2012
- Teams: 12
- League champions: Atlètic-Barceloneta (12)
- Runners-up: Sabadell

División de Honor seasons
- ← 2010–11 2012–13 →

The 2011–12 season of the División de Honor de Waterpolo was the 89th season of top-tier water polo in Spain.

Atlètic-Barceloneta won their twelfth División de Honor title.

== Teams ==
División de Honor de Waterpolo 2011–12 teams

Team	City/Area	Founded	Stadium	website
Mediterrani	Barcelona	1931	Instal·lació Josep Vallès	
Catalunya	Barcelona	1931	Complex Esportiu Pau Negre/Piscina Sant Jordi	
Atlètic-Barceloneta	Barcelona	1913 (1992)	Piscina Sant Sebastià	
Terrassa	Terrassa	1932	Àrea Olímpica	
Sant Andreu	Sant Andreu de Palomar	1971	Piscina Pere Serrat	
Real Canoe	Madrid	1931	Piscina Real Canoe	
Waterpolo Navarra	Pamplona	2006	Ciudad Deportiva Amaya	
Montjuïc	Barcelona	1944	Piscina CN Montjuïc	
Waterpolo Turia	Valencia	2007	Piscina Olímpica Castellón	
Barcelona	Barcelona	1907	Nova Escullera	
Sabadell	Sabadell	1916	Can Llong	
Mataró Quadis	Mataró	1932	Instal·lacions CN Mataró	

== Final standings ==
	Team	P	W	D	L	GF	GA	GD	Pts
1	Atlètic-Barceloneta	22	19	2	1	290	120	170	59
2	Sabadell	22	18	1	3	269	156	113	55
3	Terrassa	22	15	2	5	253	157	96	47
4	Real Canoe	22	14	3	5	253	176	77	45
5	Mataró Quadis	22	10	3	9	204	188	16	33
6	Mediterrani	22	9	2	11	189	182	7	29
7	Waterpolo Navarra	22	8	4	10	225	263	−38	28
8	Sant Andreu	22	8	2	12	205	201	4	26
9	Barcelona	22	8	0	14	189	190	−1	24
10	Catalunya	22	6	2	14	174	222	−48	20
11	Montjuïc	22	6	1	15	197	266	−69	19
12	Waterpolo Turia	22	0	0	22	107	434	−327	0

Champions League
LEN Trophy
Relegated

2011–12 División de Honor winners
(Catalonia)
Atlètic-Barceloneta
twelfth title

== Top goal scorers ==
Player	Goals	Team
(Cuba) Yuri Biart	69	Waterpolo Navarra
(Spain) Óscar Carrillo	57	Sabadell
(Spain) Sergi Mora	57	Terrassa
(Spain) Alberto Barroso	51	Real Canoe
(Spain) Mario García	50	Real Canoe
(Bulgaria) Svilen Ivanov	50	Terrassa
(Hungary) Máté Balatoni	49	Montjuïc
(Spain) Pere Estrany	48	Barcelona
(Serbia) Marko Čuk	47	Sabadell
(Spain) Gonzalo Echenique	44	Sabadell
