= 2013–14 División de Honor de Waterpolo =

División de Honor 2013–14
- League: División de Honor
- Sport: Water polo
- Duration: October 19, 2013–April 26, 2014 (regular season); May 7–May 21 (championship playoff)
- Teams: 12
- League champions: Atlètic-Barceloneta
- Runners-up: Terrassa
- Top scorer: Albert Español, 61 goals
- Relegated to 1ª División: CN Helios

División de Honor seasons
- ← 2012–13 2014–15 →

The 2013–14 season of the División de Honor de Waterpolo is the 91st season of top-tier water polo in Spain since its inception in 1925.

The season comprises regular season and championship playoff. Regular season started in October 2013 and finished on April 26, 2014. Top eight teams at standings play championship playoff.

Championship playoff will begin on 7 May with semifinals, with winners advancing to Final.

Atlètic-Barceloneta won its ninth title in a row (14 in total) after defeating CN Terrassa 3–0 in the Championship Finals.

== Teams ==
División de Honor de Waterpolo 2013–14 teams

Team	City/Area	Founded	Stadium	website
Atlètic-Barceloneta	Barcelona	1913 (1992)	Piscina Sant Sebastià	
Sabadell	Sabadell	1916	Can Llong	
Terrassa	Terrassa	1932	Àrea Olímpica	
Barcelona	Barcelona	1907	Nova Escullera	
Real Canoe–Isostar	Madrid	1931	Piscina Real Canoe	
Mediterrani	Barcelona	1931	Instal·lació Josep Vallès	
Waterpolo Navarra	Pamplona	2006	Ciudad Deportiva Amaya	
Mataró Quadis	Mataró	1932	Instal·lacions CN Mataró	
Sant Andreu	Barcelona	1971	Piscina Pere Serrat	
Catalunya	Barcelona	1931	Piscina Sant Jordi	
Helios	Zaragoza	1925	Piscina Stadium Casablanca	
Concepción–Cdad Lineal	Madrid	1969	Piscina CMD Concepción	

== Regular season standings ==
	Team	P	W	D	L	GF	GA	GD	Pts
1	Atlètic-Barceloneta	22	22	0	0	330	159	171	66
2	Terrassa	22	17	2	3	258	155	103	53
3	Mataró Quadis	22	16	3	3	228	163	65	51
4	Mediterrani	22	14	1	7	227	179	48	43
5	Sabadell	22	11	2	9	239	203	36	35
6	Real Canoe–Isostar	22	10	3	9	209	209	0	33
7	Sant Andreu	22	9	3	10	176	174	+2	30
8	Catalunya	22	9	1	12	197	211	−14	28
9	Waterpolo Navarra	22	6	2	14	170	226	−56	20
10	Barcelona	22	5	3	14	176	210	−34	18
11	Concepción–Cdad Lineal	22	1	2	19	147	298	−151	5
12	Helios	22	1	0	21	142	312	−170	3

Championship playoffs
Relegation playoff
Relegated

== Championship playoffs ==
Semifinals (best of 3)
1	Atlètic-Barceloneta	15	17
4	Mediterrani	3	14
2	Terrassa	6	13	12
3	Mataró Quadis	8	8	8

Final (best of 5)
1	Atlètic-Barceloneta	10	15	6
2	Terrassa	7	9	3

=== Semifinals ===
==== 1st leg ====
May 7; 18:00 (UTC+2)	Report	Mataró Quadis	8–6	Terrassa	Piscines Joan Serra, Mataró; Referees: Galindo Moreno, Teule Barreda
May 7; 18:00 (UTC+2)	Report	Score by quarters: 2–3, 3–1, 2–1, 1–1			Piscines Joan Serra, Mataró; Referees: Galindo Moreno, Teule Barreda
May 7; 18:00 (UTC+2)	Report	Estrany 4	Goals	Carrillo 3	Piscines Joan Serra, Mataró; Referees: Galindo Moreno, Teule Barreda

May 7; 20:45 (UTC+2)	Report	Mediterrani	3–15	Atlètic-Barceloneta	Instal.lació Josep Vallès, Barcelona; Referees: Colominas Ezponda, Guardia Marsal
May 7; 20:45 (UTC+2)	Report	Score by quarters: 1–5, 0–1, 1–6, 1–3			Instal.lació Josep Vallès, Barcelona; Referees: Colominas Ezponda, Guardia Marsal
May 7; 20:45 (UTC+2)	Report	Yánez 2	Goals	Español 5	Instal.lació Josep Vallès, Barcelona; Referees: Colominas Ezponda, Guardia Marsal

==== 2nd leg ====
May 10; 12:00 (UTC+2)	Report	Atlètic-Barceloneta	17–14	Mediterrani	Piscina Sant Sebastià, Barcelona; Referees: Piñero Martínez, Aymerich Miñarro
May 10; 12:00 (UTC+2)	Report	Score by quarters: 2–3, 4–4, 5–3, 6–4			Piscina Sant Sebastià, Barcelona; Referees: Piñero Martínez, Aymerich Miñarro
May 10; 12:00 (UTC+2)	Report	Español, Ubović 4	Goals	Santiveri, Yánez 4	Piscina Sant Sebastià, Barcelona; Referees: Piñero Martínez, Aymerich Miñarro

Atlètic-Barceloneta won series 2–0 and advanced to Final.

May 10; 18:00 (UTC+2)	Report	Terrassa	13–8	Mataró Quadis	Àrea Olímpica, Terrassa; Referees: Buch Juanola, Ortega Carreras
May 10; 18:00 (UTC+2)	Report	Score by quarters: 4–2, 3–3, 3–1, 3–2			Àrea Olímpica, Terrassa; Referees: Buch Juanola, Ortega Carreras
May 10; 18:00 (UTC+2)	Report	Alarcón 3	Goals	Estrany 3	Àrea Olímpica, Terrassa; Referees: Buch Juanola, Ortega Carreras

==== 3rd leg ====
May 11; 13:00 (UTC+2)	Report	Terrassa	12–8	Mataró Quadis	Àrea Olímpica, Terrassa; Referees: Teixidó Bermúdez, Torres Pérez
May 11; 13:00 (UTC+2)	Report	Score by quarters: 3–4, 3–1, 3–1, 3–2			Àrea Olímpica, Terrassa; Referees: Teixidó Bermúdez, Torres Pérez
May 11; 13:00 (UTC+2)	Report	Carrillo 4	Goals	three players 2	Àrea Olímpica, Terrassa; Referees: Teixidó Bermúdez, Torres Pérez

Terrassa won series 2–1 and advanced to Final.

=== Final ===
==== 1st leg ====
May 14; 19:30 (UTC+2)	Report	Atlètic-Barceloneta	10–7	Terrassa	Piscines de Sant Sebastià, Barcelona; Referees: Gómez Pordomingo, Cisneros Horrillo
May 14; 19:30 (UTC+2)	Report	Score by quarters: 3–2, 4–0, 1–3, 2–2			Piscines de Sant Sebastià, Barcelona; Referees: Gómez Pordomingo, Cisneros Horrillo
May 14; 19:30 (UTC+2)	Report	Español 4	Goals	Carrillo, Gallego 2	Piscines de Sant Sebastià, Barcelona; Referees: Gómez Pordomingo, Cisneros Horrillo

==== 2nd leg ====
May 17; 12:00 (UTC+2)	Report	Atlètic-Barceloneta	15–9	Terrassa	Piscines de Sant Sebastià, Barcelona; Referees: Moreno Cuervas, Jaumandreu Sellarès
May 17; 12:00 (UTC+2)	Report	Score by quarters: 2–3, 7–1, 5–2, 1–3			Piscines de Sant Sebastià, Barcelona; Referees: Moreno Cuervas, Jaumandreu Sellarès
May 17; 12:00 (UTC+2)	Report	Roca, Ubović 3	Goals	Carrillo 4	Piscines de Sant Sebastià, Barcelona; Referees: Moreno Cuervas, Jaumandreu Sellarès

==== 3rd leg ====
May 21; 20:45 (UTC+2)	Report	Terrassa	3–6	Atlètic-Barceloneta	Àrea Olímpica, Terrassa; Referees: Borrell Sánchez, Iñesta Peralta
May 21; 20:45 (UTC+2)	Report	Score by quarters: 1–1, 1–3, 0–1, 1–1			Àrea Olímpica, Terrassa; Referees: Borrell Sánchez, Iñesta Peralta
May 21; 20:45 (UTC+2)	Report	three players 1	Goals	Petković 2	Àrea Olímpica, Terrassa; Referees: Borrell Sánchez, Iñesta Peralta

Atlètic-Barceloneta won Championship final series 3–0.

2013–14 División de Honor winners
(Catalonia)
Atlètic-Barceloneta
Fourteenth title

== Relegation playoff ==
Playoff to be played in two legs. 1st leg to be played on 10 May and 2nd leg on 17 May. The overall winner will play in División de Honor 2014–15 and the loser one in Primera Nacional.

Team 1	Agg.	Team 2	1st leg	2nd leg
Concepción–Cdad Lineal (Community of Madrid)	23–22	(Canary Islands) Yoin! Tenerife Echeyde	13–13	10–9

=== 1st leg ===
May 10; 19:30 (UTC+1)	Report	Yoin! Tenerife Echeyde	13–13	Concepción–Cdad Lineal	Piscina Municipal, Santa Cruz; Referees: Felicidad Rodríguez, Muntané Llavería
May 10; 19:30 (UTC+1)	Report	Score by quarters: 4–6, 5–3, 4–2, 0–2			Piscina Municipal, Santa Cruz; Referees: Felicidad Rodríguez, Muntané Llavería
May 10; 19:30 (UTC+1)	Report	J.P. Sánchez 4	Goals	Martínez 4	Piscina Municipal, Santa Cruz; Referees: Felicidad Rodríguez, Muntané Llavería

=== 2nd leg ===
May 17; 18:30 (UTC+2)	Report	Concepción–Cdad Lineal	10–9	Yoin! Tenerife Echeyde	Piscina CMD Concepción, Madrid; Referees: Cabello López, Blanch Sánchez
May 17; 18:30 (UTC+2)	Report	Score by quarters: 4–2, 2–2, 3–2, 1–3			Piscina CMD Concepción, Madrid; Referees: Cabello López, Blanch Sánchez
May 17; 18:30 (UTC+2)	Report	Cagigal, Hernández Gómez 3	Goals	Fernández–Caldas 4	Piscina CMD Concepción, Madrid; Referees: Cabello López, Blanch Sánchez

Concepción–Cdad Lineal won 23–22 on aggregate and remained in División de Honor.

== Top goal scorers ==
(regular season only)

Player	Goals	Team
(Spain) Albert Español	61	CN Atlètic-Barceloneta
(Spain) Svilen Piralkov	59	CN Mataró Quadis
(Spain) Óscar Carrillo	58	CN Terrassa
(Spain) Pere Estrany	57	CN Mataró Quadis
(Spain) Alberto Barroso	55	Real Canoe-Isostar
(Spain) Gonzalo López-Escribano	50	CN Sabadell
(New Zealand) Matthew Small	50	CN Helios
(Spain) Mario García	49	Real Canoe-Isostar
(Spain) Sergi Mora	48	CN Terrassa
(Australia) Daniel Lawrence	45	Waterpolo Navarra

== See also ==
- 2013–14 División de Honor Femenina de Waterpolo
