= 2020 Men's European Water Polo Championship squads =

This article shows all participating team squads at the 2020 Men's European Water Polo Championship.

Ages, caps and clubs are as of 14 January 2020.

== Group A ==
=== Croatia ===
Head coach: Ivica Tucak

No	Name	Pos.	L/R	Date of birth	Height	Weight	Caps	Club
1	Marko Bijač	GK	R	12 January 1991 (aged 29)	1.99 m (6 ft 6 in)	88 kg (194 lb)		(Italy) Pro Recco
2	Marko Macan	DF	R	26 April 1993 (aged 26)	1.96 m (6 ft 5 in)	109 kg (240 lb)		(Croatia) VK Jug
3	Loren Fatović	W	R	16 November 1996 (aged 23)	1.85 m (6 ft 1 in)	84 kg (185 lb)		(Croatia) VK Jug
4	Luka Lončar	CF	R	26 June 1987 (aged 32)	1.95 m (6 ft 5 in)	106 kg (234 lb)		(Croatia) VK Jug
5	Maro Joković	W	L	10 January 1987 (aged 33)	2.04 m (6 ft 8 in)	96 kg (212 lb)		(Greece) Olympiacos
6	Luka Bukić	W	R	30 April 1994 (aged 25)	1.95 m (6 ft 5 in)	90 kg (200 lb)		(Croatia) HAVK Mladost
7	Ante Vukičević	W	R	24 February 1993 (aged 26)	1.87 m (6 ft 2 in)	95 kg (209 lb)		(France) CN Marseille
8	Andro Bušlje (C)	DF	R	4 January 1986 (aged 34)	1.99 m (6 ft 6 in)	115 kg (254 lb)		(Italy) Pro Recco
9	Lovre Miloš	W	R	5 April 1994 (aged 25)	1.96 m (6 ft 5 in)	94 kg (207 lb)	7	(Croatia) HAVK Mladost
10	Josip Vrlić	CF	R	25 April 1986 (aged 33)	1.98 m (6 ft 6 in)	130 kg (290 lb)		(Croatia) HAVK Mladost
11	Hrvoje Benić	D	R	26 April 1992 (aged 27)	1.98 m (6 ft 6 in)	100 kg (220 lb)		(Croatia) VK Jug
12	Xavier García	W	L	5 January 1984 (aged 36)	1.98 m (6 ft 6 in)	92 kg (203 lb)		(Croatia) VK Jug
13	Ivan Marcelić	GK	R	18 February 1994 (aged 25)	1.92 m (6 ft 4 in)	106 kg (234 lb)		(Croatia) HAVK Mladost

=== Germany ===
Head coach: Hagen Stamm

No	Name	Pos.	L/R	Date of birth	Height	Weight	Caps	Club
1	Moritz Schenkel	GK	R	4 September 1990 (aged 29)	2.03 m (6 ft 8 in)	104 kg (229 lb)	120	(Germany) Waspo Hannover
2	Ben Reibel	AR	R	27 August 1997 (aged 22)	2.07 m (6 ft 9 in)	97 kg (214 lb)	15	(Germany) Spandau 04
3	Timo van der Bosch	W	R	29 November 1993 (aged 26)	1.94 m (6 ft 4 in)	102 kg (225 lb)	95	(Germany) SV Ludwigsburg 08
4	Julian Real (C)	DF	R	22 December 1989 (aged 30)	2.00 m (6 ft 7 in)	110 kg (240 lb)	260	(Germany) Waspo Hannover
5	Hannes Schulz	W	R	25 May 1990 (aged 29)	1.87 m (6 ft 2 in)	91 kg (201 lb)	70	(Germany) OSC Potsdam
6	Maurice Jüngling	AR	R	6 October 1991 (aged 28)	1.84 m (6 ft 0 in)	87 kg (192 lb)	140	(Germany) Spandau 04
7	Dennis Strelezkij	W	R	22 April 1998 (aged 21)	1.86 m (6 ft 1 in)	98 kg (216 lb)	50	(Germany) Spandau 04
8	Lucas Gielen	DF	R	26 November 1990 (aged 29)	2.04 m (6 ft 8 in)	106 kg (234 lb)	220	(Germany) Spandau 04
9	Marko Stamm	AR	R	30 August 1988 (aged 31)	1.87 m (6 ft 2 in)	98 kg (216 lb)	265	(Germany) Spandau 04
10	Mateo Ćuk	CB	R	21 February 1990 (aged 29)	1.96 m (6 ft 5 in)	108 kg (238 lb)	75	(Germany) Spandau 04
11	Marin Restović	W	L	22 July 1990 (aged 29)	1.92 m (6 ft 4 in)	96 kg (212 lb)	105	(Germany) Spandau 04
12	Dennis Eidner	CF	R	4 August 1989 (aged 30)	1.80 m (5 ft 11 in)	112 kg (247 lb)	200	(Germany) ASC Duisburg
13	Kevin Götz	GK	R	3 February 1993 (aged 26)	1.90 m (6 ft 3 in)	84 kg (185 lb)	79	(Germany) Waspo Hannover

=== Montenegro ===
Head coach: Vladimir Gojković

No	Name	Pos.	L/R	Date of birth	Height	Weight	Caps	Club
1	Dejan Lazović	GK	R	8 February 1990 (aged 29)	1.98 m (6 ft 6 in)	102 kg (225 lb)	88	(Montenegro) VK Budva
2	Draško Brguljan (C)	DF	R	27 December 1984 (aged 35)	1.94 m (6 ft 4 in)	92 kg (203 lb)	320	(Hungary) Orvosegyetem SC
3	Đuro Radović	FP	L	20 February 1999 (aged 20)	1.93 m (6 ft 4 in)	93 kg (205 lb)	30	(Montenegro) PVK Jadran
4	Marko Petković	W	R	3 March 1989 (aged 30)	1.89 m (6 ft 2 in)	85 kg (187 lb)	50	(Montenegro) PVK Jadran
5	Uroš Čučković	DF	R	25 April 1990 (aged 29)	1.99 m (6 ft 6 in)	100 kg (220 lb)	108	(France) CN Marseille
6	Dositej Obradović	DF	R	22 August 1994 (aged 25)	1.96 m (6 ft 5 in)	97 kg (214 lb)	7	(Montenegro) PVK Jadran
7	Stefan Vidović	FP	R	8 August 1992 (aged 27)	1.87 m (6 ft 2 in)	85 kg (187 lb)	50	(Italy) CC Ortigia
8	Bogdan Đurđić	W	R	8 August 1996 (aged 23)	1.84 m (6 ft 0 in)	87 kg (192 lb)	47	(France) CN Marseille
9	Aleksandar Ivović	DF	R	24 February 1986 (aged 33)	1.98 m (6 ft 6 in)	108 kg (238 lb)	300	(Italy) Pro Recco
10	Vladan Spaić	CF	R	18 June 1997 (aged 22)	1.89 m (6 ft 2 in)	103 kg (227 lb)	40	(Montenegro) PVK Jadran
11	Dragan Drašković	AR	R	1 September 1988 (aged 31)	1.94 m (6 ft 4 in)	95 kg (209 lb)	91	(Italy) TeLiMar Palermo
12	Stefan Pješivac	CF	R	12 December 1996 (aged 23)	1.90 m (6 ft 3 in)	110 kg (240 lb)		(Germany) Spandau 04
13	Petar Tešanović	GK	R	26 November 1998 (aged 21)	1.95 m (6 ft 5 in)	91 kg (201 lb)		(Montenegro) PVK Jadran

=== Slovakia ===
Head coach: Peter Nižný

No	Name	Pos.	L/R	Date of birth	Height	Weight	Caps	Club
1	Tomáš Hoferica	GK	R	22 November 1993 (aged 26)	1.95 m (6 ft 5 in)	91 kg (201 lb)	50	(France) Stade de Reims
2	Matej Čaraj	CF	L	20 September 2000 (aged 19)	1.88 m (6 ft 2 in)	99 kg (218 lb)	10	(France) Stade de Reims
3	Juraj Zaťovič (C)	AR	R	22 October 1982 (aged 37)	1.92 m (6 ft 4 in)	98 kg (216 lb)	300	(Slovakia) KVP Nováky
4	Adam Furman	W	R	16 May 1999 (aged 20)	1.90 m (6 ft 3 in)	93 kg (205 lb)	10	(France) Sète
5	Adam Mitruk	AR	L	10 May 1999 (aged 20)	1.78 m (5 ft 10 in)	86 kg (190 lb)	40	(Austria) ASV Vienna
6	Marek Molnár	FP	R	31 October 1991 (aged 28)	1.96 m (6 ft 5 in)	100 kg (220 lb)	15	(Germany) SG Neukölln Berlin
7	Maroš Tkáč	W	R	13 July 1996 (aged 23)	1.90 m (6 ft 3 in)	93 kg (205 lb)	65	(Croatia) VK Primorje
8	Marek Tkáč	AR	R	9 March 1995 (aged 24)	1.89 m (6 ft 2 in)	97 kg (214 lb)	8	(France) Pays d'Aix
9	Tomáš Bielik	AR	R	19 November 1993 (aged 26)	1.90 m (6 ft 3 in)	98 kg (216 lb)	70	(France) Stade de Reims
10	Andrej Kováčik	W	L	6 December 1993 (aged 26)	1.92 m (6 ft 4 in)	72 kg (159 lb)	20	(Slovakia) KVP Nováky
11	Martin Kolárik	AR	R	18 March 1986 (aged 33)	1.94 m (6 ft 4 in)	103 kg (227 lb)	108	(France) CNN Noissy-le-Sec
12	Samuel Baláž	AR	R	5 January 1994 (aged 26)	1.85 m (6 ft 1 in)	95 kg (209 lb)	56	(France) Stade de Reims
13	Lukáš Kozmér	GK	R	6 December 1993 (aged 26)	1.97 m (6 ft 6 in)	88 kg (194 lb)	75	(France) Sète

== Group B ==
=== Netherlands ===
Head coach: Harry van der Meer

No	Name	Pos.	L/R	Date of birth	Height	Weight	Caps	Club
1	Eelco Wagenaar (C)	GK	R	22 November 1991 (aged 28)	1.96 m (6 ft 5 in)	87 kg (192 lb)	125	(Netherlands) Polar Bears Ede
2	Kjeld Veenhuis	AR	R	30 January 1995 (aged 24)	1.85 m (6 ft 1 in)	88 kg (194 lb)	40	(Netherlands) GZC Donk
3	Jorn Winkelhorst	CF	R	26 December 1991 (aged 28)	2.00 m (6 ft 7 in)	116 kg (256 lb)	120	(Germany) Waspo Hannover
4	San van den Burg	CB	R	25 October 1997 (aged 22)	1.98 m (6 ft 6 in)	96 kg (212 lb)	60	(Spain) CN Barcelona
5	Guus van Ijperen	CF	R	28 February 1995 (aged 24)	1.98 m (6 ft 6 in)	97 kg (214 lb)	50	(Netherlands) GZC Donk
6	Robin Lindhout	FP	R	25 October 1990 (aged 29)	1.94 m (6 ft 4 in)	107 kg (236 lb)	180	(Italy) SC Quinto
7	Lars Gottemaker	W	L	29 July 1987 (aged 32)	1.86 m (6 ft 1 in)	94 kg (207 lb)	180	(Netherlands) ZPC Het Ravijn
8	Jesse Nispeling	CB	R	21 August 1995 (aged 24)	2.00 m (6 ft 7 in)	105 kg (231 lb)	40	(France) ENT Tourcoing
9	Harmen Muller	AR	R	13 April 1995 (aged 24)	1.91 m (6 ft 3 in)	88 kg (194 lb)	50	(France) FNC Douai
10	Pascal Janssen	AR	R	24 March 1996 (aged 23)	1.85 m (6 ft 1 in)	87 kg (192 lb)	50	(Netherlands) UZSC Utrecht
11	Jesse Koopman	AR	R	4 April 1993 (aged 26)	1.95 m (6 ft 5 in)	95 kg (209 lb)	130	(France) ENT Tourcoing
12	Thomas Lucas	CF	R	25 April 1989 (aged 30)	2.00 m (6 ft 7 in)	105 kg (231 lb)	170	(Netherlands) ZV De Zaan
13	Theodorus Huijsmans	GK	R	28 July 1998 (aged 21)	1.85 m (6 ft 1 in)	90 kg (200 lb)		(Netherlands) ZV De Zaan

=== Romania ===
Head coach: (Greece) Athanasios Kechagias

No	Name	Pos.	L/R	Date of birth	Height	Weight	Caps	Club
1	Marius Tic	GK	R	9 September 1996 (aged 23)	1.92 m (6 ft 4 in)	100 kg (220 lb)	65	(Romania) Steaua Bucharest
2	Cosmin Radu (C)	CF	L	9 November 1981 (aged 38)	1.94 m (6 ft 4 in)	100 kg (220 lb)	449	(Croatia) HAVK Mladost
3	Tiberiu Negrean	D	R	1 September 1988 (aged 31)	1.96 m (6 ft 5 in)	95 kg (209 lb)	350	(Germany) Spandau 04
4	Mihnea Gheorghe	D	R	15 January 1994 (aged 25)	1.90 m (6 ft 3 in)	94 kg (207 lb)	113	(Romania) Steaua Bucharest
5	Victor Antipa	W	L	9 June 1999 (aged 20)	1.84 m (6 ft 0 in)	93 kg (205 lb)	28	(Romania) Steaua Bucharest
6	Andrei Prioteasa	D	R	3 April 1996 (aged 23)	1.85 m (6 ft 1 in)	72 kg (159 lb)	29	(Romania) Dinamo Bucharest
7	Vlad Georgescu	D	R	31 March 1999 (aged 20)	1.86 m (6 ft 1 in)	87 kg (192 lb)	23	(Romania) CSM Oradea
8	Tudor Fulea	D	R	13 March 1997 (aged 22)	1.97 m (6 ft 6 in)	84 kg (185 lb)	25	(Romania) Steaua Bucharest
9	Róbert Gergelyfi	D	R	8 May 1995 (aged 24)	1.87 m (6 ft 2 in)	86 kg (190 lb)	23	(Hungary) Szentes
10	Nicolae Oanta	CB	R	14 June 1990 (aged 29)	1.94 m (6 ft 4 in)	100 kg (220 lb)	53	(Romania) Steaua Bucharest
11	Alexandru Ghiban	FP	R	12 October 1986 (aged 33)	1.96 m (6 ft 5 in)	99 kg (218 lb)	356	(Romania) Steaua Bucharest
12	Levente Vancsik	CF	R	12 July 1994 (aged 25)	2.00 m (6 ft 7 in)	108 kg (238 lb)	14	(Hungary) Debrecen
13	Şerban Abrudan	GK	R	28 November 2000 (aged 19)	1.94 m (6 ft 4 in)	89 kg (196 lb)	18	(Romania) Dinamo Bucharest

=== Russia ===
Head coach: Sergey Yevstigneyev

No	Name	Pos.	L/R	Date of birth	Height	Weight	Caps	Club
1	Petr Fedotov	GK	R	2 July 1992 (aged 27)	1.88 m (6 ft 2 in)	84 kg (185 lb)	40	(Russia) Spartak Volgograd
2	Ivan Suchkov	DF	R	15 June 1995 (aged 24)	1.96 m (6 ft 5 in)	97 kg (214 lb)	56	(Russia) Dynamo Moscow
3	Ivan Vasilev	W	R	25 March 2000 (aged 19)	1.97 m (6 ft 6 in)	80 kg (180 lb)	23	(Russia) Baltika Saint-Petersburg
4	Nikita Dereviankin	CF	L	21 June 1994 (aged 25)	1.95 m (6 ft 5 in)	109 kg (240 lb)	60	(Russia) Sintez Kazan
5	Artem Ashaev	FP	R	5 December 1988 (aged 31)	1.91 m (6 ft 3 in)	96 kg (212 lb)	45	(Russia) Spartak Volgograd
6	Konstantin Kharkov	W	L	23 February 1997 (aged 22)	1.97 m (6 ft 6 in)	93 kg (205 lb)	36	(Croatia) HAVK Mladost
7	Daniil Merkulov	FP	R	3 March 1997 (aged 22)	1.91 m (6 ft 3 in)	105 kg (231 lb)	73	(Croatia) VK Jug
8	Ivan Nagaev	W	L	30 November 1993 (aged 26)	1.90 m (6 ft 3 in)	93 kg (205 lb)	74	(Germany) Waspo Hannover
9	Igor Bychkov	CF	R	21 January 1994 (aged 25)	2.02 m (6 ft 8 in)	110 kg (240 lb)	45	(Russia) Dynamo Moscow
10	Konstantin Kiselev	DF	R	16 May 1995 (aged 24)	1.93 m (6 ft 4 in)	104 kg (229 lb)	10	(Russia) Spartak Volgograd
11	Sergey Lisunov (C)	CF	R	12 October 1986 (aged 33)	1.97 m (6 ft 6 in)	110 kg (240 lb)	253	(Russia) Sintez Kazan
12	Roman Shepelev	FP	R	3 August 1993 (aged 26)	1.90 m (6 ft 3 in)	86 kg (190 lb)	71	(Russia) Dynamo Moscow
13	Vitaly Statsenko	GK	R	21 July 1997 (aged 22)	1.84 m (6 ft 0 in)	95 kg (209 lb)	38	(Russia) TSOP Moscow

=== Serbia ===
Head coach: Dejan Savić

No	Name	Pos.	L/R	Date of birth	Height	Weight	Caps	Club
1	Gojko Pijetlović	GK	R	7 August 1983 (aged 36)	1.97 m (6 ft 6 in)	97 kg (214 lb)	260	(Romania) CSM Oradea
2	Dušan Mandić	W	L	16 June 1994 (aged 25)	2.02 m (6 ft 8 in)	100 kg (220 lb)	187	(Italy) Pro Recco
3	Nikola Dedović	W	R	25 January 1992 (aged 27)	1.89 m (6 ft 2 in)	92 kg (203 lb)	18	(Germany) Spandau 04
4	Sava Ranđelović	CB	R	17 July 1993 (aged 26)	1.93 m (6 ft 4 in)	94 kg (207 lb)	155	(Hungary) Orvosegyetem SC
5	Miloš Ćuk	D	R	21 December 1990 (aged 29)	1.91 m (6 ft 3 in)	91 kg (201 lb)	195	(Croatia) HAVK Mladost
6	Duško Pijetlović	CF	R	25 April 1985 (aged 34)	1.97 m (6 ft 6 in)	99 kg (218 lb)	325	(Hungary) Szolnok
7	Nemanja Vico	CF	R	19 November 1994 (aged 25)	1.89 m (6 ft 2 in)	100 kg (220 lb)	37	(Italy) Trieste
8	Milan Aleksić	CB	R	13 May 1986 (aged 33)	1.93 m (6 ft 4 in)	94 kg (207 lb)	254	(Spain) CN Atlètic-Barceloneta
9	Nikola Jakšić	CB	R	17 January 1997 (aged 22)	1.97 m (6 ft 6 in)	91 kg (201 lb)	120	(Hungary) Ferencváros
10	Filip Filipović (C)	W	L	2 May 1987 (aged 32)	1.96 m (6 ft 5 in)	101 kg (223 lb)	360	(Italy) Pro Recco
11	Andrija Prlainović	W	R	28 April 1987 (aged 32)	1.89 m (6 ft 2 in)	93 kg (205 lb)	317	(Hungary) Orvosegyetem SC
12	Stefan Mitrović	D	R	29 March 1988 (aged 31)	1.95 m (6 ft 5 in)	91 kg (201 lb)	250	(Greece) Olympiacos
13	Branislav Mitrović	GK	R	30 January 1985 (aged 34)	2.01 m (6 ft 7 in)	100 kg (220 lb)	175	(Hungary) Orvosegyetem SC

== Group C ==
=== Hungary ===
Head coach: Tamás Märcz

No	Name	Pos.	L/R	Date of birth	Height	Weight	Caps	Club
1	Viktor Nagy	GK	R	24 July 1984 (aged 35)	1.98 m (6 ft 6 in)	98 kg (216 lb)	217	(Hungary) Szolnok
2	Dániel Angyal	DF	R	29 March 1992 (aged 27)	2.03 m (6 ft 8 in)	108 kg (238 lb)	64	(Hungary) Szolnok
3	Krisztián Manhercz	W	R	6 February 1997 (aged 22)	1.92 m (6 ft 4 in)	91 kg (201 lb)	123	(Hungary) Orvosegyetem SC
4	Gergő Zalánki	W	L	26 February 1995 (aged 24)	1.93 m (6 ft 4 in)	91 kg (201 lb)	95	(Hungary) Ferencváros
5	Márton Vámos	W	L	24 June 1992 (aged 27)	2.03 m (6 ft 8 in)	106 kg (234 lb)	222	(Hungary) Ferencváros
6	Norbert Hosnyánszky	DF	R	4 March 1984 (aged 35)	1.96 m (6 ft 5 in)	101 kg (223 lb)		(Hungary) Eger
7	Zoltán Pohl	DF	R	27 March 1995 (aged 24)	1.95 m (6 ft 5 in)	100 kg (220 lb)	43	(Hungary) Ferencváros
8	Szilárd Jansik	DF	R	6 April 1994 (aged 25)	1.95 m (6 ft 5 in)	96 kg (212 lb)	37	(Hungary) Ferencváros
9	Balázs Erdélyi	W	R	16 February 1990 (aged 29)	1.96 m (6 ft 5 in)	94 kg (207 lb)	123	(Hungary) Orvosegyetem SC
10	Dénes Varga (C)	CF	R	29 March 1987 (aged 32)	2.02 m (6 ft 8 in)	113 kg (249 lb)	235	(Hungary) Orvosegyetem SC
11	Tamás Mezei	CF	L	14 September 1990 (aged 29)	1.97 m (6 ft 6 in)	108 kg (238 lb)	73	(Hungary) Ferencváros
12	Balázs Hárai	CB	R	5 April 1987 (aged 32)	2.03 m (6 ft 8 in)	110 kg (240 lb)		(Hungary) Eger
13	Soma Vogel	GK	R	7 July 1997 (aged 22)	1.98 m (6 ft 6 in)	85 kg (187 lb)	21	(Hungary) Ferencváros

=== Malta ===
Head coach: Karl Izzo

No	Name	Pos.	L/R	Date of birth	Height	Weight	Caps	Club
1	Nicholas-Kane Grixti	GK	R	13 October 1995 (aged 24)	1.87 m (6 ft 2 in)	92 kg (203 lb)	37	(Malta) Sirens ASC
2	Jerome Gabarretta	CF	R	3 June 1990 (aged 29)	1.96 m (6 ft 5 in)	94 kg (207 lb)	65	(Malta) Sliema ASC
3	Andreas Galea	W	R	17 September 1996 (aged 23)	1.77 m (5 ft 10 in)	74 kg (163 lb)	5	(Malta) San Giljan ASC
4	Gabriel Pace	DF	R	10 April 1993 (aged 26)	1.85 m (6 ft 1 in)	83 kg (183 lb)	4	(Malta) Neptunes WPSC
5	Darren Zammit	CB	R	1 January 1999 (aged 21)	1.83 m (6 ft 0 in)	88 kg (194 lb)		(Malta) San Giljan ASC
6	Matthew Zammit	CF	L	1 October 1987 (aged 32)	1.96 m (6 ft 5 in)	115 kg (254 lb)	80	(Malta) San Giljan ASC
7	Stevie Camilleri (C)	FP	R	4 July 1987 (aged 32)	1.90 m (6 ft 3 in)	90 kg (200 lb)	65	(Italy) Roma Nuoto
8	Jordan Camilleri	DF	R	14 September 1992 (aged 27)	1.86 m (6 ft 1 in)	87 kg (192 lb)	59	(Malta) Neptunes WPSC
9	Jeremy Abela	CF	R	10 June 1998 (aged 21)	1.85 m (6 ft 1 in)	105 kg (231 lb)	10	(Malta) Neptunes WPSC
10	Aurelien Cousin	DF	R	1 February 1980 (aged 39)	1.98 m (6 ft 6 in)	105 kg (231 lb)	400	(Malta) Exiles SC
11	Ben Plumpton	W	R	16 February 1998 (aged 21)	1.80 m (5 ft 11 in)	77 kg (170 lb)	15	(Malta) San Giljan ASC
12	Dino Zammit	W	R	14 December 1994 (aged 25)	1.77 m (5 ft 10 in)	95 kg (209 lb)	60	(Malta) San Giljan ASC
13	Alan Borg Cole	GK	R	5 October 1990 (aged 29)	1.75 m (5 ft 9 in)	87 kg (192 lb)		(Malta) Neptunes WPSC

=== Spain ===
Head coach: David Martín

No	Name	Pos.	L/R	Date of birth	Height	Weight	Caps	Club
1	Daniel López	GK	R	16 July 1980 (aged 39)	1.91 m (6 ft 3 in)	90 kg (200 lb)		(Spain) CN Atlètic-Barceloneta
2	Alberto Munarriz	DF	R	19 May 1994 (aged 25)	1.97 m (6 ft 6 in)	106 kg (234 lb)	100	(Spain) CN Atlètic-Barceloneta
3	Álvaro Granados	W	R	8 October 1998 (aged 21)	1.90 m (6 ft 3 in)	86 kg (190 lb)		(Spain) CN Atlètic-Barceloneta
4	Bernat Sanahuja	DF	R	21 October 2000 (aged 19)	1.92 m (6 ft 4 in)	86 kg (190 lb)	8	(Spain) CN Terrassa
5	Miguel de Toro	CF	R	16 August 1993 (aged 26)	2.03 m (6 ft 8 in)	110 kg (240 lb)		(Spain) CE Mediterrani
6	Marc Larumbe	DF	R	30 April 1994 (aged 25)	1.98 m (6 ft 6 in)	94 kg (207 lb)	80	(Spain) CN Atlètic-Barceloneta
7	Adrian Delgado	W	R	7 April 1990 (aged 29)	1.83 m (6 ft 0 in)	83 kg (183 lb)		(Spain) CN Barcelona
8	Francisco Fernández	DF	R	21 June 1986 (aged 33)	1.85 m (6 ft 1 in)	84 kg (185 lb)	200	(Spain) CN Atlètic-Barceloneta
9	Roger Tahull	CF	R	11 May 1997 (aged 22)	1.95 m (6 ft 5 in)	104 kg (229 lb)		(Spain) CN Atlètic-Barceloneta
10	Felipe Perrone (C)	W	R	27 February 1986 (aged 33)	1.83 m (6 ft 0 in)	96 kg (212 lb)		(Spain) CN Atlètic-Barceloneta
11	Blai Mallarach	W	L	21 August 1987 (aged 32)	1.87 m (6 ft 2 in)	87 kg (192 lb)	180	(Spain) CN Atlètic-Barceloneta
12	Alejandro Bustos	DF	R	17 March 1997 (aged 21)	1.94 m (6 ft 4 in)	106 kg (234 lb)		(Spain) CN Atlètic-Barceloneta
13	Eduardo Lorrio	GK	R	25 September 1993 (aged 26)	1.93 m (6 ft 4 in)	85 kg (187 lb)		(Spain) CN Barcelona

=== Turkey ===
Head coach: Sinan Turunç

No	Name	Pos.	L/R	Date of birth	Height	Weight	Caps	Club
1	Attila Sezer	GK	R	13 September 1975 (aged 44)	1.97 m (6 ft 6 in)	105 kg (231 lb)	295	(Turkey) Enka SK
2	Selçuc Can Caner	AR	R	3 December 2001 (aged 18)	1.86 m (6 ft 1 in)	83 kg (183 lb)	30	(Turkey) Adalar SS
3	Mehmet Yutmaz	AR	R	7 July 2002 (aged 17)	1.93 m (6 ft 4 in)	98 kg (216 lb)	25	(Turkey) Enka SK
4	Fatih Acar	AR	R	22 November 1998 (aged 21)	1.88 m (6 ft 2 in)	84 kg (185 lb)	35	(Turkey) Enka SK
5	Berk Bıyık (C)	CF	R	1 January 1993 (aged 27)	1.94 m (6 ft 4 in)	110 kg (240 lb)	100	(Turkey) Heybeliada SK
6	Emre Gürdenli	CB	R	17 May 2000 (aged 19)	1.92 m (6 ft 4 in)	90 kg (200 lb)	15	(Turkey) Enka SK
7	Emirhan Yenigün	CB	R	11 December 1993 (aged 26)	1.93 m (6 ft 4 in)	95 kg (209 lb)		(Turkey) Heybeliada SK
8	Oğuz Berke Senemoğlu	AR	R	7 March 1995 (aged 24)	1.86 m (6 ft 1 in)	77 kg (170 lb)	40	(Turkey) Galatasaray
9	Nadir Sönmez	AR	R	29 October 1992 (aged 27)	1.87 m (6 ft 2 in)	100 kg (220 lb)	60	(Turkey) Heybeliada SK
10	Neşfet Toğkan Ozbek	AR	R	2 September 1994 (aged 25)	1.85 m (6 ft 1 in)	75 kg (165 lb)	100	(Turkey) Galatasaray
11	Ege Kahraman	AR	R	8 March 1999 (aged 20)	1.86 m (6 ft 1 in)	80 kg (180 lb)	40	(Turkey) Enka SK
12	Mehmet Dilek Gökmen	CF	R	5 February 1999 (aged 20)	1.98 m (6 ft 6 in)	107 kg (236 lb)	20	(Turkey) Galatasaray
13	Hüseyin Kağan Kil	GK	R	23 July 1999 (aged 20)	1.92 m (6 ft 4 in)	83 kg (183 lb)	28	(Turkey) Galatasaray

== Group D ==
=== France ===
Head coach: (Montenegro) Nenad Vukanić

No	Name	Pos.	L/R	Date of birth	Height	Weight	Caps	Club
1	Rémi Garsau	GK	R	19 July 1984 (aged 35)	1.91 m (6 ft 3 in)	82 kg (181 lb)		(France) Olympic Nice
2	Rémi Saudadier	AR	R	20 March 1986 (aged 33)	1.98 m (6 ft 6 in)	100 kg (220 lb)		(Germany) Spandau 04
3	Romain Marion-Vernoux	AR	R	2 January 2000 (aged 20)	1.89 m (6 ft 2 in)	85 kg (187 lb)		(France) CN Marseille
4	Thomas Vernoux	W	R	21 March 2002 (aged 17)	1.90 m (6 ft 3 in)	87 kg (192 lb)		(France) CN Marseille
5	Enzo Khasz	FP	R	13 August 1993 (aged 26)	2.02 m (6 ft 8 in)	105 kg (231 lb)		(France) USB Bordeaux
6	Uroš Kalinić	DF	R	7 April 1986 (aged 33)	2.00 m (6 ft 7 in)	100 kg (220 lb)		(France) Montpellier
7	Ugo Crousillat (C)	FP	L	27 October 1990 (aged 29)	1.92 m (6 ft 4 in)	85 kg (187 lb)		(France) CN Marseille
8	Mihal Idzinsky	W	L	23 July 1992 (aged 27)	1.78 m (5 ft 10 in)	76 kg (168 lb)		(France) CN Marseille
9	Mehdi Marzouki	CF	R	26 May 1987 (aged 32)	1.92 m (6 ft 4 in)	102 kg (225 lb)		(France) CNN Noisy-le-Sec
10	Charles Canonne	W	R	9 February 1996 (aged 23)	1.87 m (6 ft 2 in)	83 kg (183 lb)		(France) FNC Douai
11	Pierre Vanpeperstraete	FP	R	14 May 1992 (aged 27)	1.90 m (6 ft 3 in)	100 kg (220 lb)		(France) CN Marseille
12	Alexandre Camarasa	CB	R	10 June 1987 (aged 32)	1.93 m (6 ft 4 in)	106 kg (234 lb)		(France) CN Marseille
13	Hugo Fontani	GK	R	22 December 1994 (aged 25)	1.90 m (6 ft 3 in)	90 kg (200 lb)		(France) Team Strasbourg

=== Georgia ===
Head coach: Revaz Chomakhidze

No	Name	Pos.	L/R	Date of birth	Height	Weight	Caps	Club
1	Nikoloz Shubladze	GK	R	27 December 1993 (aged 26)	1.90 m (6 ft 3 in)	95 kg (209 lb)	68	(Georgia (country)) Dinamo Tbilisi
2	Beka Kavtaradze	DF	R	9 July 1990 (aged 29)	1.91 m (6 ft 3 in)	102 kg (225 lb)	78	(Georgia (country)) Dinamo Tbilisi
3	Damir Tsrepulia	W	L	16 January 1984 (aged 35)	1.90 m (6 ft 3 in)	93 kg (205 lb)	42	(Georgia (country)) Dinamo Tbilisi
4	Revaz Imnaishvili	W	R	9 August 1997 (aged 22)	1.86 m (6 ft 1 in)	96 kg (212 lb)	40	(Georgia (country)) Dinamo Tbilisi
5	Andria Bitadze	CF	R	17 May 1997 (aged 22)	2.03 m (6 ft 8 in)	115 kg (254 lb)	30	(Georgia (country)) Dinamo Tbilisi
6	Marko Jelaca	DF	R	15 December 1982 (aged 37)	2.05 m (6 ft 9 in)	105 kg (231 lb)	98	(Georgia (country)) Dinamo Tbilisi
7	Khvicha Jakhaia	DF	R	16 September 1996 (aged 23)	1.95 m (6 ft 5 in)	103 kg (227 lb)	78	(Georgia (country)) Dinamo Tbilisi
8	Mikheil Baghaturia	W	R	9 May 1987 (aged 32)	1.83 m (6 ft 0 in)	85 kg (187 lb)	120	(Georgia (country)) Dinamo Tbilisi
9	Zurab Rurua (C)	FP	R	8 June 1987 (aged 32)	1.86 m (6 ft 1 in)	87 kg (192 lb)	138	(Georgia (country)) Dinamo Tbilisi
10	Giorgi Magrakvelidze	FP	R	21 January 1998 (aged 21)	1.83 m (6 ft 0 in)	90 kg (200 lb)	63	(Georgia (country)) Dinamo Tbilisi
11	Fabio Baraldi	CF	R	21 March 1990 (aged 29)	2.02 m (6 ft 8 in)	115 kg (254 lb)		(Georgia (country)) Dinamo Tbilisi
12	Boris Vapenski	W	L	9 October 1990 (aged 29)	1.91 m (6 ft 3 in)	103 kg (227 lb)	1	(Georgia (country)) Dinamo Tbilisi
13	Irakli Razmadze	GK	R	4 April 1997 (aged 22)	1.90 m (6 ft 3 in)	95 kg (209 lb)	59	(Georgia (country)) Dinamo Tbilisi

=== Greece ===
Head coach: Thodoris Vlachos

No	Name	Pos.	L/R	Date of birth	Height	Weight	Caps	Club
1	Emmanouil Zerdevas	GK	R	12 August 1997 (aged 22)	1.85 m (6 ft 1 in)	89 kg (196 lb)		(Greece) Olympiacos
2	Konstantinos Genidounias	W	R	3 May 1993 (aged 26)	1.83 m (6 ft 0 in)	92 kg (203 lb)		(Greece) Olympiacos
3	Dimitrios Skoumpakis	DF	R	18 December 1998 (aged 21)	2.03 m (6 ft 8 in)	109 kg (240 lb)		(Greece) Olympiacos
4	Marios Kapotsis	W	R	13 September 1991 (aged 28)	1.83 m (6 ft 0 in)	84 kg (185 lb)		(Romania) Steaua Bucharest
5	Ioannis Fountoulis (C)	W	R	25 May 1988 (aged 31)	1.86 m (6 ft 1 in)	89 kg (196 lb)		(Hungary) Ferencváros
6	Alexandros Papanastasiou	FP	R	12 February 1999 (aged 20)	1.95 m (6 ft 5 in)	86 kg (190 lb)		(Croatia) VK Jug
7	Georgios Dervisis	CF	R	30 October 1994 (aged 25)	1.95 m (6 ft 5 in)	100 kg (220 lb)		(Greece) Olympiacos
8	Stylianos Argyropoulos	DF	R	2 August 1996 (aged 23)	1.90 m (6 ft 3 in)	100 kg (220 lb)		(Greece) Olympiacos
9	Konstantinos Mourikis	CF	R	11 July 1988 (aged 31)	1.97 m (6 ft 6 in)	115 kg (254 lb)		(Greece) Olympiacos
10	Christodoulos Kolomvos	CF	R	26 October 1988 (aged 31)	1.86 m (6 ft 1 in)	106 kg (234 lb)		(Turkey) Enka SK
11	Alexandros Gounas	W	R	3 October 1989 (aged 30)	1.80 m (5 ft 11 in)	75 kg (165 lb)		(Greece) Olympiacos
12	Angelos Vlachopoulos	W	R	28 September 1991 (aged 28)	1.80 m (5 ft 11 in)	80 kg (180 lb)		(Hungary) Eger
13	Konstantinos Galandis	GK	R	1 September 1990 (aged 29)	2.02 m (6 ft 8 in)	110 kg (240 lb)		(Greece) Apollon Smyrnis

=== Italy ===
Head coach: Alessandro Campagna

No	Name	Pos.	L/R	Date of birth	Height	Weight	Caps	Club
1	Marco Del Lungo	GK	R	1 March 1990 (aged 29)	1.90 m (6 ft 3 in)	100 kg (220 lb)	175	(Italy) AN Brescia
2	Francesco Di Fulvio	W	R	15 August 1993 (aged 26)	1.88 m (6 ft 2 in)	82 kg (181 lb)	177	(Italy) Pro Recco
3	Stefano Luongo	W	R	5 January 1990 (aged 30)	1.84 m (6 ft 0 in)	84 kg (185 lb)	153	(Italy) Pro Recco
4	Pietro Figlioli (C)	FP	R	29 May 1984 (aged 35)	1.92 m (6 ft 4 in)	97 kg (214 lb)	254	(Italy) Pro Recco
5	Andrea Fondelli	W	R	27 February 1994 (aged 25)	1.87 m (6 ft 2 in)	90 kg (200 lb)	129	(Italy) Pro Recco
6	Alessandro Velotto	DF	R	12 February 1995 (aged 24)	1.85 m (6 ft 1 in)	79 kg (174 lb)	142	(Italy) Pro Recco
7	Vincenzo Renzuto	DF	R	8 April 1993 (aged 26)	1.82 m (6 ft 0 in)	76 kg (168 lb)	88	(Italy) Pro Recco
8	Gonzalo Echenique	W	L	27 April 1990 (aged 29)	1.94 m (6 ft 4 in)	96 kg (212 lb)	46	(Italy) Pro Recco
9	Niccolò Figari	DF	R	24 January 1988 (aged 31)	1.98 m (6 ft 6 in)	91 kg (201 lb)	156	(Italy) AN Brescia
10	Michaël Bodegas	CB	R	3 May 1987 (aged 32)	1.92 m (6 ft 4 in)	102 kg (225 lb)	110	(Spain) CN Atlètic-Barceloneta
11	Matteo Aicardi	CF	R	19 April 1986 (aged 33)	1.92 m (6 ft 4 in)	104 kg (229 lb)	255	(Italy) Pro Recco
12	Vincenzo Dolce	FP	R	11 May 1995 (aged 24)	1.95 m (6 ft 5 in)	92 kg (203 lb)	42	(Italy) Sport Management
13	Gianmarco Nicosia	GK	R	12 February 1998 (aged 21)	1.87 m (6 ft 2 in)	93 kg (205 lb)	46	(Italy) Sport Management

Abbreviations

GK: Goalkeeper; AR: All-Round; DF: Defender; CB: Centre-back; D: Driver; W: Wing; CF: Centre-forward; C: Captain

== Statistics ==
=== Player representation by league system ===
In all, European Championship squad members play for clubs in 16 different countries.

League	Teams																Total
League	(Croatia)	(France)	(Georgia (country))	(Germany)	(Greece)	(Hungary)	(Italy)	(Malta)	(Montenegro)	(Netherlands)	(Romania)	(Russia)	(Serbia)	(Slovakia)	(Spain)	(Turkey)	Total
Austria	–	–	–	–	–	–	–	–	–	–	–	–	–	1	–	–	1
Croatia	9	–	–	–	1	–	–	–	–	–	1	2	1	1	–	–	15
France	1	12	–	–	–	–	–	–	2	3	–	–	–	7	–	–	25
Georgia	–	–	13	–	–	–	–	–	–	–	–	–	–	–	–	–	13
Germany	–	1	–	13	–	–	–	–	1	1	1	1	1	1	–	–	20
Greece	1	–	–	–	8	–	–	–	–	–	–	–	1	–	–	–	10
Hungary	–	–	–	–	2	13	–	–	1	–	2	–	5	–	–	–	23
Italy	2	-	–	–	–	–	12	1	3	1	–	–	3	–	–	–	22
Malta	–	–	–	–	–	–	–	12	–	–	–	–	–	–	–	–	12
Montenegro	–	–	–	–	–	–	–	–	6	–	–	–	–	–	–	–	6
Netherlands	–	–	–	–	–	–	–	–	–	7	–	–	–	–	–	–	7
Romania	–	–	–	–	1	–	–	–	–	–	9	–	1	–	–	–	11
Russia	–	–	–	–	–	–	–	–	–	–	–	10	–	–	–	–	10
Slovakia	–	–	–	–	–	–	–	–	–	–	–	–	–	3	–	–	3
Spain	–	–	–	–	–	–	1	–	–	1	–	–	1	–	13	–	16
Turkey	–	–	–	–	1	–	–	–	–	–	–	–	–	–	–	13	14

=== Most represented clubs ===
Rank	Club	Players
1	(Georgia (country)) Dinamo Tbilisi	13
1	(Italy) Pro Recco	13
3	(Spain) CN Atlètic-Barceloneta	11
3	(Germany) Spandau 04	11
5	(Hungary) Ferencváros	9
5	(Greece) Olympiacos	9
7	(France) CN Marseille	8
8	(Croatia) HAVK Mladost	7
8	(Hungary) Orvosegyetem SC	7
8	(Croatia) VK Jug	7
