= Josip Vrlić =

Croatian water polo player

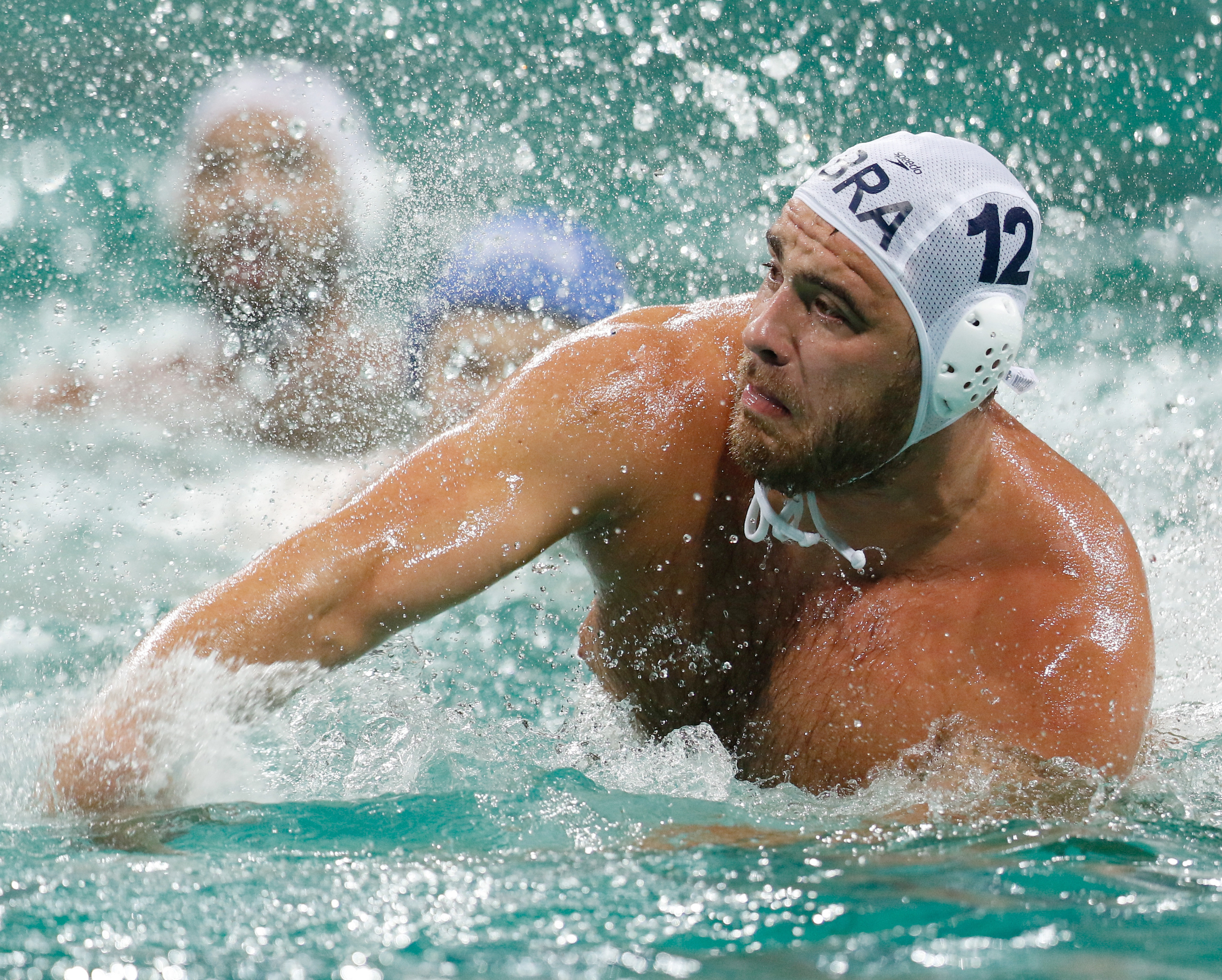
- Vrlić representing Brazil at the 2016 Summer Olympics

Personal information
- Nationality: Croatian
- Born: 25 April 1986 (age 40) Rijeka, SR Croatia, Yugoslavia
- Height: 2.00 m (6 ft 7 in)
- Weight: 135 kg (298 lb)

Sport
- Sport: Water polo
- Position: Centre forward
- Current club: Radnički Kragujevac

Senior clubs
- Years: Team
- 2006–2010: Primorje Rijeka
- 2010–2013: Atlètic-Barceloneta
- 2013–2014: Botafogo
- 2014–2015: Radnički Kragujevac
- 2015–2017: Jug Dubrovnik
- 2017–2019: Atlètic-Barceloneta
- 2019–2021: Mladost
- 2021–: Radnički Kragujevac
National team
- Years: Team
- Croatia
Medal record
Men's water polo
Representing Brazil
World League
Bronze medal – third place	2015 Bergamo
Pan American Games
Silver medal – second place	2015 Toronto	Team
Representing Croatia
Olympic Games
Silver medal – second place	2024 Paris	Team
World Championships
Gold medal – first place	2024 Doha	Team
Bronze medal – third place	2019 Gwanjgu	Team
European Championship
Gold medal – first place	2022 Split
Silver medal – second place	2024 Zagreb
Bronze medal – third place	2018 Barcelona

Josip Vrlić (born 25 April 1986) is a Croatian professional water polo player. He was part of the Brazilian team at the 2015 World Aquatics Championships and 2016 Summer Olympics. He won a silver medal at the 2015 Pan American Games.

His younger brother Mislav is also water polo player, playing for VK Primorje from Rijeka. He is the heaviest water polo player and cited as "one of the strongest water polo players in the world."

As of July 2019, it is revealed Vrlić has transferred to HAVK Mladost from Barceloneta, water polo club from Zagreb for which he will be playing in upcoming months.

== Honours ==
=== Club ===
Jug Dubrovnik

- LEN Champions League:2015–16; runners-up: 2016–17
- LEN Super Cup: 2016
- Croatian Championship: 2015–16, 2016–17
- Adriatic League: 2015–16, 2016–17

Atlètic-Barceloneta

- Spanish Championship: 2010–11, 2011–12, 2012–13, 2017–18, 2018–19
- Copa del Rey: 2010, 2013, 2018, 2019
- Supercopa de España: 2018, 2019

Botafogo

- Brazilian Championship: 2013–14

Mladost

- Croatian Championship: 2020–21
- Croatian Cup: 2020–21

Radnički Kragujevac

- Serbian Cup: 2014–15, 2021–22

== Awards ==
- Member of the World Team 2019, 2022 by total-waterpolo
- LEN Champions League Center Forward of the Year: 2017–18, 2018–19

== See also ==
- List of World Aquatics Championships medalists in water polo
