= 2014–15 División de Honor de Waterpolo =

División de Honor 2014–15
- League: División de Honor
- Sport: Water polo
- Duration: October 4, 2014–April 25, 2015 (regular season); May 5–May 21 (championship playoff)
- Number of teams: 12
- League champions: Atlètic-Barceloneta
- Runners-up: Mediterrani
- Top scorer: Sergi Mora, 65 goals
- Relegated to 1ª División: AR Concepción-Ciudad Lineal

División de Honor seasons
- ← 2013–14 2015–16 →

The 2014–15 season of the División de Honor de Waterpolo is the 92nd season of top-tier water polo in Spain since its inception in 1925.

The season comprises regular season and championship playoff. The regular season started in October 2014 and finished on April 25, 2015. The top eight teams at standing played in the championship playoff.

The championship playoff began with the quarter-finals series on 5 May.

Atlètic-Barceloneta won its tenth consecutive title after defeating CE Mediterrani in the Championship Final series 2–0.

== Competition ==
=== Format ===
The División de Honor season took place between October and May, with every team playing each other at home and away for a total of 22 matches. Points were awarded according to the following:

- 3 points for a win
- 1 point for a draw

The team with the highest number of points at the end of the 22 matches became the champion.

=== Promotion and relegation ===
The bottom team in the standings at the end of the season was relegated to Primera División, while the top team from Primera División was promoted.

== Team information ==
División de Honor de Waterpolo 2014–15 teams
Barcelona División de Honor waterpolo teams

The following 12 clubs compete in the División de Honor during the 2014–15 season:

División de Honor
Team	City	Pool	Founded	Colours
Barcelona	Barcelona	Nova Escullera	1907	
Barceloneta	Barcelona	Piscina Sant Sebastià	1913	
Catalunya	Barcelona	Piscina Sant Jordi	1931	
Concepción	Madrid	Piscina Felipe Scandone	1969	
Mataró	Mataró	Piscina Joan Serra	1932	
Mediterrani	Barcelona	Instal·lació Josep Vallès	1931	
Navarra	Pamplona	Ciudad Deportiva Amaya	2006	
Poble Nou	Barcelona	Piscina Sant Jordi	1930	
Real Canoe	Madrid	Piscina Real Canoe	1931	
Sabadell	Sabadell	Can Llong	1916	
Sant Andreu	Barcelona	Piscina Pere Serrat	1971	
Terrassa	Terrassa	Àrea Olímpica	1932	

== Regular season standings ==
Pos	Team	Pld	W	D	L	GF	GA	GD	Pts	Qualification or relegation
1	Terrassa	22	19	2	1	272	163	+109	59	Qualification to championship playoffs
2	Atlètic-Barceloneta	22	19	1	2	322	139	+183	58	Qualification to championship playoffs
3	Sabadell	22	14	3	5	239	199	+40	45	Qualification to championship playoffs
4	Real Canoe–Isostar	22	12	2	8	177	185	−8	38	Qualification to championship playoffs
5	Mediterrani	22	12	1	9	189	184	+5	37	Qualification to championship playoffs
6	Barcelona	22	11	2	9	200	182	+18	35	Qualification to championship playoffs
7	Catalunya	22	9	2	11	223	208	+15	29	Qualification to championship playoffs
8	Mataró Quadis	22	9	1	12	199	173	+26	28	Qualification to championship playoffs
9	Sant Andreu	22	8	2	12	194	226	−32	26	
10	Poble Nou–Enginyers	22	7	2	13	199	201	−2	23	Relegation to Primera División
11	Waterpolo Navarra	22	2	1	19	142	273	−131	7	Qualification to relegation playoff
12	Concepción–Cdad Lineal	22	0	1	21	100	323	−223	1	Relegation to Primera División

Updated to match(es) played on 1 May 2015. Source: División de Honor table and lnfs.es
Rules for classification: 1) points; 2) head-to-head points; 3) head-to-head goal difference; 4) goal difference; 5) number of goals scored

=== Schedule and results ===
1. round ( 2014.10.04 )
Navarra – Concepción	12–5
Sabadell – Mediterrani	6–9
Real Canoe – Catalunya	11–8
Sant Andreu – Barcelona	7–10
Poble Nou – Mataró	6–13
Terrassa – Barceloneta	8–7

2. round ( 2014.10.11 )
Mataró – Real Canoe	2–4
Barceloneta – Poble Nou	17–9
Barcelona – Sabadell	5–10
Concepción – Sant Andreu	7–13
Catalunya – Navarra	17–2
Mediterrani – Terrassa	9–10

3. round ( 2014.10.18 )
Mataró – Barceloneta	3–14
Sabadell – Concepción	15–4
Real Canoe – Navarra	9–6
Sant Andreu – Catalunya	8–8
Terrassa – Barcelona	8–8
Poble Nou – Mediterrani	7–8

4. round ( 2014.10.25 )
Mediterrani – Mataró	12–8
Navarra – Sant Andreu	5–10
Barceloneta – Real Canoe	17–5
Barcelona – Poble Nou	7–6
Concepción – Terrassa	6–16
Catalunya – Sabadell	10–11

5. round ( 2014.11.01 )
Barceloneta – Mediterrani	19–6
Mataró – Barcelona	12–4
Sabadell – Navarra	16–7
Terrassa – Catalunya	18–6
Real Canoe – Sant Andreu	6–4
Poble Nou – Concepción	13–3

6. round ( 2014.11.08 )
Mediterrani – Real Canoe	9–6
Navarra – Terrassa	9–15
Barcelona – Barceloneta	7–15
Concepción – Mataró	2–17
Sant Andreu – Sabadell	8–8
Catalunya – Poble Nou	8–9

7. round ( 2014.11.22 )
Mediterrani – Barcelona	11–10
Mataró – Catalunya	9–8
Real Canoe – Sabadell	9–8
Terrassa – Sant Andreu	15–7
Poble Nou – Navarra	12–6
Barceloneta – Concepción	11–4

8. round ( 2014.11.29 )
Barceloneta – Catalunya	17–8
Navarra – Mataró	5–14
Barcelona – Real Canoe	8–9
Sabadell – Terrassa	9–9
Concepción – Mediterrani	2–12
Sant Andreu – Poble Nou	5–11

9. round ( 2014.12.13 )
Mediterrani – Catalunya	9–7
Barcelona – Concepción	13–2
Barceloneta – Navarra	18–8
Real Canoe – Terrassa	11–13
Mataró – Sant Andreu	9–10
Poble Nou – Sabadell	10–13

10. round ( 2014.12.20 )
Catalunya – Barcelona	10–6
Navarra – Mediterrani	7–9
Sabadell – Mataró	11–7
Real Canoe – Concepción	8–5
Sant Andreu – Barceloneta	4–13
Terrassa – Poble Nou	14–7

11. round ( 2014.01.10 )
Mediterrani – Sant Andreu	10–8
Barcelona – Navarra	10–8
Barceloneta – Sabadell	17–7
Concepción – Catalunya	6–14
Poble Nou – Real Canoe	7–11
Mataró – Terrassa	6–9

12. round ( 2015.01.17 )
Mediterrani – Sabadell	7–7
Mataró – Poble Nou	9–9
Barceloneta – Terrassa	9–10
Barcelona – Sant Andreu	13–6
Concepción – Navarra	8–8
Catalunya – Real Canoe	11–11

13. round ( 2015.01.24 )
Terrassa – Mediterrani	11–6
Poble Nou – Barceloneta	6–6
Navarra – Catalunya	5–14
Sabadell – Barcelona	12–6
Real Canoe – Mataró	10–9
Sant Andreu – Concepción	16–6

14. round ( 2015.01.31 )
Mediterrani – Poble Nou	5–8
Navarra – Real Canoe	8–7
Barceloneta – Mataró	8–6
Barcelona – Terrassa	8–9
Concepción – Sabadell	7–14
Catalunya – Sant Andreu	11–7

15. round ( 2015.02.07 )
Real Canoe – Barceloneta	6–14
Terrassa – Concepción	23–5
Mataró – Mediterrani	6–4
Poble Nou – Barcelona	8–9
Sabadell – Catalunya	13–11
Sant Andreu – Navarra	13–11

16. round ( 2015.02.21 )
Mediterrani – Barceloneta	3–13
Navarra – Sabadell	5–10
Barcelona – Mataró	8–6
Concepción – Poble Nou	1–18
Sant Andreu – Real Canoe	10–6
Catalunya – Terrassa	8–11

17. round ( 2015.03.07 )
Sabadell – Sant Andreu	11–13
Barceloneta – Barcelona	12–6
Mataró – Concepción	16–4
Real Canoe – Mediterrani	9–7
Terrassa – Navarra	18–3
Poble Nou – Catalunya	7–10

18. round ( 2015.03.21 )
Navarra – Poble Nou	4–11
Barcelona – Mediterrani	10–8
Sabadell – Real Canoe	9–8
Concepción – Barceloneta	5–21
Sant Andreu – Terrassa	10–11
Catalunya – Mataró	9–8

19. round ( 2015.03.28 )
Mediterrani – Concepción	16–4
Mataró – Navarra	13–6
Real Canoe – Barcelona	8–8
Catalunya – Barceloneta	7–20
Terrassa – Sabadell	12–13
Poble Nou – Sant Andreu	–

20. round ( 2015.04.11 )
Navarra – Barceloneta	–
Sabadell – Poble Nou	–
Concepción – Barcelona	–
Sant Andreu – Mataró	–
Catalunya – Mediterrani	–
Terrassa – Real Canoe	–

21. round ( 2015.04.18 )
Pro Recco – Acquachiara	–
Roma Vis Nova – AN Brescia	–
Lazio – CC Napoli	–
Bogliasco – Como	–
Florentia – Posillipo	–
S.M. Verona – Savona	–

22. round ( 2015.04.25 )
CC Napoli – Bogliasco	–
Acquachiara – Florentia	–
Savona – Lazio	–
Como – Pro Recco	–
Posillipo – Roma Vis Nova	–
AN Brescia – S.M. Verona	–

== Championship playoffs ==
Quarter-finals (best of 3)
1	Terrassa	11	2	6
8	Mataró Quadis	6	4	7
4	Real Canoe-Isostar	12	11^{4}	5
5	Mediterrani	10	11^{5}	8
2	Atlètic-Barceloneta	24	24
7	Catalunya	10	6
3	Sabadell	12	11	13
6	Barcelona	13	8	6

Semi-finals (best of 3)
8	Mataró Quadis	9	7
5	Mediterrani	10	9
2	Atlètic-Barceloneta	11	11
3	Sabadell	8	8

Final (best of 3)
5	Mediterrani	6	5
2	Atlètic-Barceloneta	18	12

=== Quarter-finals ===
==== 1st match ====
May 5; 18:00 (UTC+2)	Report	Terrassa	11–6	Mataró Quadis	Piscina Àrea Olímpica, Terrassa; Referees: Galindo Moreno, Cisneros Horrillo
May 5; 18:00 (UTC+2)	Report	Score by quarters: 0–1, 4–2, 5–1, 2–2			Piscina Àrea Olímpica, Terrassa; Referees: Galindo Moreno, Cisneros Horrillo
May 5; 18:00 (UTC+2)	Report	Mora 4	Goals	Estrany 4	Piscina Àrea Olímpica, Terrassa; Referees: Galindo Moreno, Cisneros Horrillo

May 6; 19:00 (UTC+2)	Report	Real Canoe–Isostar	12–10	Mediterrani	Centro de Natación Mundial 86, Madrid; Referees: Felicidad Rodríguez, Cabello López
May 6; 19:00 (UTC+2)	Report	Score by quarters: 1–2, 6–3, 3–3, 2–2			Centro de Natación Mundial 86, Madrid; Referees: Felicidad Rodríguez, Cabello López
May 6; 19:00 (UTC+2)	Report	Bustos 3	Goals	González, Larumbe 3	Centro de Natación Mundial 86, Madrid; Referees: Felicidad Rodríguez, Cabello López

May 6; 20:45 (UTC+2)	Report	Atlètic-Barceloneta	24–10	Catalunya	Piscina Sant Sebastià, Barcelona; Referees: Buch Juanola, Jaumandreu Sellarès
May 6; 20:45 (UTC+2)	Report	Score by quarters: 8–1, 5–4, 6–2, 5–3			Piscina Sant Sebastià, Barcelona; Referees: Buch Juanola, Jaumandreu Sellarès
May 6; 20:45 (UTC+2)	Report	Español, Echenique 5	Goals	Trilles 3	Piscina Sant Sebastià, Barcelona; Referees: Buch Juanola, Jaumandreu Sellarès

May 6; 20:45 (UTC+2)	Report	Sabadell	12–13	Barcelona	Piscines Carles Ibars, Sabadell; Referees: Colominas Ezponda, Teule Barreda
May 6; 20:45 (UTC+2)	Report	Score by quarters: 2–4, 5–3, 2–2, 3–4			Piscines Carles Ibars, Sabadell; Referees: Colominas Ezponda, Teule Barreda
May 6; 20:45 (UTC+2)	Report	Fenoy 3	Goals	Oneto, Flores 4	Piscines Carles Ibars, Sabadell; Referees: Colominas Ezponda, Teule Barreda

==== 2nd match ====
May 7; 18:00 (UTC+2)	Report	Mataró Quadis	4–2	Terrassa	Piscina Joan Serra, Mataró; Referees: Jaumandreu Sellarès, Teule Barreda
May 7; 18:00 (UTC+2)	Report	Score by quarters: 0–0, 1–0, 3–1, 0–1			Piscina Joan Serra, Mataró; Referees: Jaumandreu Sellarès, Teule Barreda
May 7; 18:00 (UTC+2)	Report	Marzouki 3	Goals	Fran Sánchez 2	Piscina Joan Serra, Mataró; Referees: Jaumandreu Sellarès, Teule Barreda

May 8; 19:00 (UTC+2)	Report	Mediterrani	16–15	Real Canoe–Isostar	Piscina Josep Vallès, Barcelona; Referees: Iñesta Peralta, Cisneros Horrillo
May 8; 19:00 (UTC+2)	Report	Score by quarters: 2–1, 3–4, 3–3, 3–3; Pen: 5–4			Piscina Josep Vallès, Barcelona; Referees: Iñesta Peralta, Cisneros Horrillo
May 8; 19:00 (UTC+2)	Report	González, Larumbe 4	Goals	Barroso, Bustos 4	Piscina Josep Vallès, Barcelona; Referees: Iñesta Peralta, Cisneros Horrillo

May 6; 20:45 (UTC+2)	Report	Barcelona	8–11	Sabadell	Piscina Nova Escullera, Barcelona; Referees: Gómez Pordomingo, Torres Pérez
May 6; 20:45 (UTC+2)	Report	Score by quarters: 2–2, 1–2, 2–3, 3–4			Piscina Nova Escullera, Barcelona; Referees: Gómez Pordomingo, Torres Pérez
May 6; 20:45 (UTC+2)	Report	three players 2	Goals	four players 2	Piscina Nova Escullera, Barcelona; Referees: Gómez Pordomingo, Torres Pérez

May 8; 20:45 (UTC+2)	Report	Catalunya	6–24	Atlètic-Barceloneta	Piscina Sant Jordi, Barcelona; Referees: Colominas Ezponda, Ortega Carreras
May 8; 20:45 (UTC+2)	Report	Score by quarters: 0–5, 2–6, 1–7, 3–6			Piscina Sant Jordi, Barcelona; Referees: Colominas Ezponda, Ortega Carreras
May 8; 20:45 (UTC+2)	Report	Babay, Trilles 2	Goals	Español 6	Piscina Sant Jordi, Barcelona; Referees: Colominas Ezponda, Ortega Carreras

Atlètic-Barceloneta wins series 2–0.

==== 3rd match ====
May 9; 18:00 (UTC+2)	Report	Terrassa	6–7	Mataró Quadis	Piscina Àrea Olímpica, Terrassa; Referees: Iñesta Peralta, Jiménez Turnes
May 9; 18:00 (UTC+2)	Report	Score by quarters: 3–2, 2–2, 1–2, 0–1			Piscina Àrea Olímpica, Terrassa; Referees: Iñesta Peralta, Jiménez Turnes
May 9; 18:00 (UTC+2)	Report	Pericas 2	Goals	Corbalán 2	Piscina Àrea Olímpica, Terrassa; Referees: Iñesta Peralta, Jiménez Turnes

Mataró Quadis wins series 2–1.

May 10; 12:30 (UTC+2)	Report	Real Canoe–Isostar	5–8	Mediterrani	Centro de Natación Mundial 86, Madrid; Referees: Galindo Moreno, Colominas Ezponda
May 10; 12:30 (UTC+2)	Report	Score by quarters: 2–4, 1–1, 1–2, 1–1			Centro de Natación Mundial 86, Madrid; Referees: Galindo Moreno, Colominas Ezponda
May 10; 12:30 (UTC+2)	Report	Barroso 3	Goals	Hodaly 2	Centro de Natación Mundial 86, Madrid; Referees: Galindo Moreno, Colominas Ezponda

Mediterrani wins series 2–1.

May 10; 12:45 (UTC+2)	Report	Sabadell	13–6	Barcelona	Piscines Carles Ibars, Sabadell; Referees: Buch Juanola, Cisneros Horrillo
May 10; 12:45 (UTC+2)	Report	Score by quarters: 2–2, 3–1, 4–1, 4–2			Piscines Carles Ibars, Sabadell; Referees: Buch Juanola, Cisneros Horrillo
May 10; 12:45 (UTC+2)	Report	Cabanas 3	Goals	Winkelhorst 2	Piscines Carles Ibars, Sabadell; Referees: Buch Juanola, Cisneros Horrillo

Sabadell wins series 2–1.

=== Semifinals ===
==== 1st match ====
May 13; 20:30 (UTC+2)	Report	Mediterrani	10–9	Mataró Quadis	Piscina Josep Vallès, Barcelona; Referees: Teixidó Bermúdez, Iñesta Peralta
May 13; 20:30 (UTC+2)	Report	Score by quarters: 1–1, 3–3, 1–2, 5–3			Piscina Josep Vallès, Barcelona; Referees: Teixidó Bermúdez, Iñesta Peralta
May 13; 20:30 (UTC+2)	Report	Larumbe, Yáñez 3	Goals	Marzouki 5	Piscina Josep Vallès, Barcelona; Referees: Teixidó Bermúdez, Iñesta Peralta

May 13; 20:45 (UTC+2)	Report	Atlètic-Barceloneta	11–8	Sabadell	Piscina Sant Sebastià, Barcelona; Referees: Buch Juanola, Gómez Pordomingo
May 13; 20:45 (UTC+2)	Report	Score by quarters: 3–3, 5–1, 3–3, 0–1			Piscina Sant Sebastià, Barcelona; Referees: Buch Juanola, Gómez Pordomingo
May 13; 20:45 (UTC+2)	Report	Español 4	Goals	Cabanas, Marsal 2	Piscina Sant Sebastià, Barcelona; Referees: Buch Juanola, Gómez Pordomingo

==== 2nd match ====
May 15; 18:00 (UTC+2)	Report	Mataró Quadis	7–9	Mediterrani	Piscina Joan Serra, Mataró; Referees: Galindo Moreno, Jaumandreu Sellarès
May 15; 18:00 (UTC+2)	Report	Score by quarters: 1–2, 1–1, 2–1, 3–5			Piscina Joan Serra, Mataró; Referees: Galindo Moreno, Jaumandreu Sellarès
May 15; 18:00 (UTC+2)	Report	V Fernández, Estrany 2	Goals	Yáñez 4	Piscina Joan Serra, Mataró; Referees: Galindo Moreno, Jaumandreu Sellarès

Mediterrani wins series 2–0.

May 15; 20:45 (UTC+2)	Report	Sabadell	8–11	Atlètic-Barceloneta	Piscines Carles Ibars, Sabadell; Referees: Colominas Ezponda, Cisneros Horrillo
May 15; 20:45 (UTC+2)	Report	Score by quarters: 2–2, 2–2, 3–3, 1–4			Piscines Carles Ibars, Sabadell; Referees: Colominas Ezponda, Cisneros Horrillo
May 15; 20:45 (UTC+2)	Report	Soler 3	Goals	Español, Minguell 3	Piscines Carles Ibars, Sabadell; Referees: Colominas Ezponda, Cisneros Horrillo

Atlètic-Barceloneta wins series 2–0.

=== Final ===
==== 1st match ====
May 19; 20:45 (UTC+2)	Report	Atlètic-Barceloneta	18–6	Mediterrani	Piscina Sant Sebastià, Barcelona; Referees: Buch Juanola, Colominas Ezponda
May 19; 20:45 (UTC+2)	Report	Score by quarters: 3–0, 4–2, 7–2, 4–2			Piscina Sant Sebastià, Barcelona; Referees: Buch Juanola, Colominas Ezponda
May 19; 20:45 (UTC+2)	Report	Echenique 4	Goals	Yáñez 3	Piscina Sant Sebastià, Barcelona; Referees: Buch Juanola, Colominas Ezponda

==== 2nd match ====
May 21; 19:30 (UTC+2)	Report	Mediterrani	5–12	Atlètic-Barceloneta	Piscina Josep Vallès, Barcelona; Referees: Teixidó Bermúdez, Iñesta Peralta
May 21; 19:30 (UTC+2)	Report	Score by quarters: 1–2, 1–3, 1–4, 2–3			Piscina Josep Vallès, Barcelona; Referees: Teixidó Bermúdez, Iñesta Peralta
May 21; 19:30 (UTC+2)	Report	Aguirán 2	Goals	Perrone, Español 4	Piscina Josep Vallès, Barcelona; Referees: Teixidó Bermúdez, Iñesta Peralta

Atlètic-Barceloneta wins championship Final series 2–0.

2014–15 División de Honor winners
(Catalonia)
Atlètic-Barceloneta
Fifteenth title

==== Individual awards ====
- Championship MVP: (Spain) Sergi Mora, CN Terrassa
- Best Goalkeeper: (Poland) Michał Diakonów, CN Mataró Quadis
- Top goalscorer: (Spain) Sergi Mora, CN Terrassa

== Relegation playoff ==
Playoff to be played in two legs. 1st leg to be played on 9 May and 2nd leg on 16 May. The overall winner will play in División de Honor 2015–16 and the loser will play in Primera Nacional.

Team 1	Agg.	Team 2	1st leg	2nd leg
Waterpolo Navarra (Navarre)	19–19 (3–0 p)	(Canary Islands) Acuasport Tenerife Echeyde	12–13	7–6

=== 1st leg ===
May 9; 11:00 (UTC+1)	Report	Acuasport Tenerife Echeyde	13–12	Waterpolo Navarra	Piscina Quico Cabrera, Santa Cruz; Referees: Piñero Martínez, Cerezo Crespo
May 9; 11:00 (UTC+1)	Report	Score by quarters: 0–1, 3–2, 5–3, 5–6			Piscina Quico Cabrera, Santa Cruz; Referees: Piñero Martínez, Cerezo Crespo
May 9; 11:00 (UTC+1)	Report	Alcalá 4	Goals	Small 3	Piscina Quico Cabrera, Santa Cruz; Referees: Piñero Martínez, Cerezo Crespo

=== 2nd leg ===
May 16; 19:00 (UTC+2)	Report	Waterpolo Navarra	7–6	Acuasport Tenerife Echeyde	Ciudad Deportiva Amaya, Pamplona; Referees: Gómez Pordomingo, Ortega Carreras
May 16; 19:00 (UTC+2)	Report	Score by quarters: 2–2, 2–0, 3–1, 0–3; Pen: 3–0			Ciudad Deportiva Amaya, Pamplona; Referees: Gómez Pordomingo, Ortega Carreras
May 16; 19:00 (UTC+2)	Report	Esteban 3	Goals	Alcalá 3	Ciudad Deportiva Amaya, Pamplona; Referees: Gómez Pordomingo, Ortega Carreras

19–19 on aggregate. Waterpolo Navarra won the penalty shoot-out 3–0 and remained in División de Honor.

== Season statistics ==
=== Top goalscorers ===
Rank	Player	Team	Goals
1	(Spain) Sergi Mora	Terrassa	65
2	(Spain) Albert Español	Barceloneta	59
2	(Hungary) Árpád Babay	Catalunya	59
4	(France) Mehdi Marzouki	Mataró-Quadis	53
5	(Spain) Víctor Flores	Barcelona	49
6	(Slovakia) Lukáš Ďurík	Sant Andreu	48
7	(Colombia) Alejandro Idárraga	Poble Nou–Enginyers	47
8	(Spain) Alberto Barroso	Real Canoe	46
9	(Spain) Rubén de Lera	Terrassa	45
10	(Brazil) Guilherme Oneto	Barcelona	44

=== Number of teams by autonomous communities ===
	Autonomous Communities	No. teams	Teams
1	Catalonia	9	Barcelona, Barceloneta, Catalunya, Mataró, Mediterrani, Poble Nou, Sabadell, Sant Andreu and Terrassa
2	Madrid	2	Concepción and Real Canoe
3	Navarre	1	Navarra

== See also ==
- 2014–15 División de Honor Femenina de Waterpolo
