= Adrià Delgado =

Spanish Brazilian water polo player

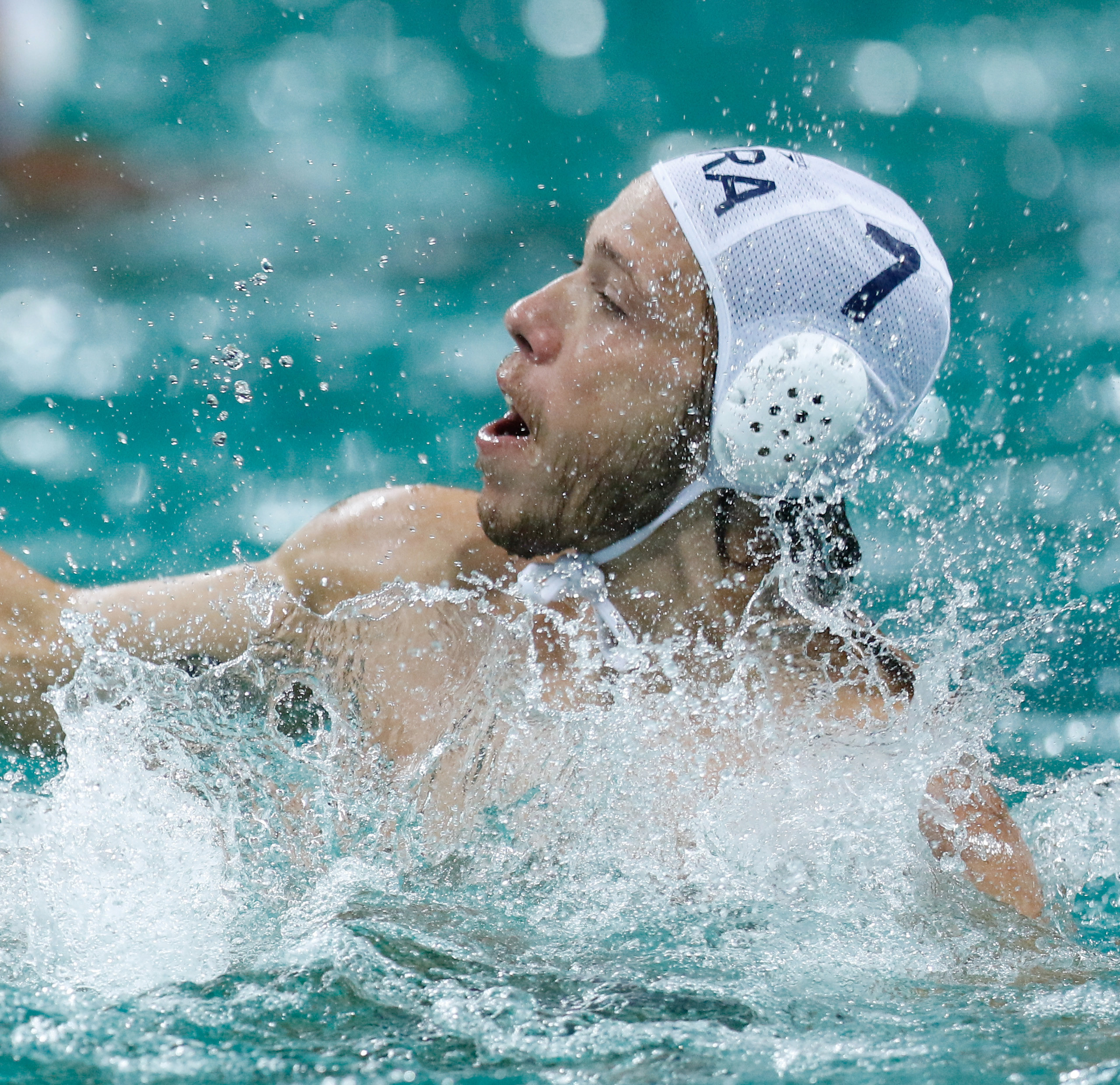
- Delgado in 2016

Personal information
- Full name: Adrià Delgado Baches
- Born: 7 April 1990 (age 36)
- Height: 184 cm (6 ft 0 in)
- Weight: 84 kg (185 lb)

Sport
- Sport: Water polo
- Club: Club Natació Barcelona
Medal record
Representing Brazil
Pan American Games
Silver medal – second place	2015 Toronto	Team
Representing Spain
European Championship
Silver medal – second place	2020 Budapest	Team

Adrià Delgado Baches (born 7 April 1990) is a Spanish Brazilian water polo player. He was part of the Brazilian team at the 2016 Summer Olympics, where the team was eliminated in the quarterfinals.
