= 2003–04 LEN Trophy =

- League: LEN Trophy
- Sport: Water Polo
- Duration: 4 November 2003 to 2004
- Number of teams: 31
- Finals champions: (Spain) Barcelona (2nd title)
- Runners-up: (Greece) Vouliagmeni

LEN Trophy seasons
- ← 2002–03 2004–05 →

The 2003–04 LEN Trophy was the 12th edition of LEN's second-tier competition for men's water polo clubs.

== Knockout stage ==
=== Eight Finals ===
Team 1	Agg.	Team 2	1st leg	2nd leg
Ferencváros (Hungary)	17–16	(Hungary) Szeged	7–10	10–6
Jadran Split (Croatia)	14–7	(Serbia and Montenegro) Budvanska Rivijera	9–1	5–6
Niš (Serbia and Montenegro)	16–13	(Greece) Ethnikos Piraeus	9–6	7–7
CN Marseille (France)	17–13	(Russia) CSKA Moscow	11–5	6–7
Chios (Greece)	13–16	(Greece) Vouliagmeni	7–7	6–9
Mataró (Spain)	19–20	(Greece) Chania	9–7	10–13
Barcelona (Spain)	25–14	(Russia) Dynamo Moscow	18–10	7–4
Strasbourg (France)	9–13	(Croatia) Mornar	4–4	5–9

=== Quarter-finals ===
Team 1	Agg.	Team 2	1st leg	2nd leg
Vouliagmeni (Greece)	13–12	(Hungary) Ferencváros	8–5	5–7
CN Marseille (France)	7–16	(Spain) Barcelona	2–6	5–10
Jadran Split (Croatia)	20–12	(Greece) Chania	12–9	8–3
Niš (Serbia and Montenegro)	16–13	(Croatia) Mornar	9–6	7–7

=== Semi-finals ===
Team 1	Agg.	Team 2	1st leg	2nd leg
Barcelona (Spain)	16–11	(Croatia) Jadran Split	9–1	8–10
Vouliagmeni (Greece)	15–13	(Serbia and Montenegro) Niš	10–6	5–7

=== Final ===
Team 1	Agg.	Team 2	1st leg	2nd leg
Vouliagmeni (Greece)	16–21	(Spain) Barcelona	11–11	5–10

2003–04 LEN Trophy
Champions

Barcelona
2nd Cup

== See also ==
- 2003–04 LEN Euroleague
