= Supercopa de España de Waterpolo =

Spanish men's water polo tournament

- Sport: water polo
- Founded: 2001
- No. of teams: 2
- Country: Spain
- Most recent champion: Sabadell (2020)
- Most titles: Atlètic-Barceloneta, 14 titles
- Website: www.rfen.es

Supercopa de España is the Spanish water polo's tournament.

It is played as a single match between the League's champion and the Copa del Rey's winner. If a same team wins League and Cup, the Supercopa is played between the League's champion and the Copa's runners-up.

Supercopa was established in 2001 and is usually contested in late September or early October.

== Winners by year ==
Year	Venue	Winner	Runners-up	Score
2001	Zaragoza	(Catalonia) Atlètic-Barceloneta	(Community of Madrid) Real Canoe	8–6
2002	Barcelona	(Catalonia) Sabadell	(Catalonia) Barcelona	6–4
2003	Zaragoza	(Catalonia) Atlètic-Barceloneta	(Catalonia) Barcelona	13–9
2004	Barcelona	(Catalonia) Atlètic-Barceloneta	(Catalonia) Barcelona	6–5
2005	Barcelona	(Catalonia) Sabadell	(Catalonia) Barcelona	8–5
2006	Barcelona	(Catalonia) Atlètic-Barceloneta	(Catalonia) Sabadell	14–8
2007	Manresa	(Catalonia) Atlètic-Barceloneta	(Catalonia) Terrassa	14–5
2008	Barcelona	(Catalonia) Atlètic-Barceloneta	(Catalonia) Sant Andreu	17–6
2009	Terrassa	(Catalonia) Atlètic-Barceloneta	(Catalonia) Terrassa	11–4
2010	Barcelona	(Catalonia) Atlètic-Barceloneta	(Catalonia) Sabadell	11–7
2011	Molins de Rei	(Catalonia) Atlètic-Barceloneta	(Catalonia) Barcelona	14–6
2012	Sabadell	(Catalonia) Sabadell	(Catalonia) Atlètic-Barceloneta	9–7
2013	Barcelona	(Catalonia) Atlètic-Barceloneta	(Community of Madrid) Real Canoe–Isostar	14–7
2014	Barcelona	(Catalonia) Sant Andreu	(Catalonia) Atlètic-Barceloneta	13–12
2015	Sabadell	(Catalonia) Atlètic-Barceloneta	(Catalonia) Mediterrani	12–9
2016	Terrassa	(Catalonia) Atlètic-Barceloneta	(Catalonia) Sabadell	12–5
2017	Barcelona	(Catalonia) Atlètic-Barceloneta	(Catalonia) Terrassa	9–4
2018	Barcelona	(Catalonia) Atlètic-Barceloneta	(Catalonia) Terrassa	13–6
2019	Terrassa	(Catalonia) Atlètic-Barceloneta	(Catalonia) Mediterrani	19–8
2020	Sabadell	(Catalonia) Sabadell	(Catalonia) Barcelona	10–9

== Titles by team ==
Team	Titles	Years won
(Catalonia) Atlètic-Barceloneta	15	2001, 2003, 2004, 2006, 2007, 2008, 2009, 2010, 2011, 2013, 2015, 2016, 2017, 2018, 2019
(Catalonia) Sabadell	4	2002, 2005, 2012, 2020
(Catalonia) Sant Andreu	1	2014

== See also ==
- División de Honor
- Copa del Rey
- Supercopa de España Femenina
