= Brna =

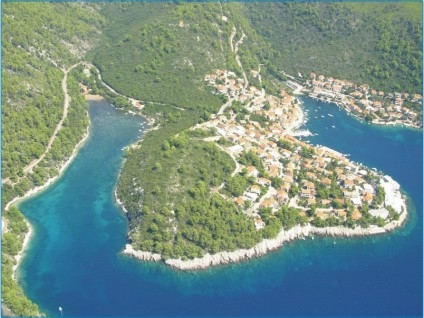
- Brna and the bay of Istruga from the air

- Location of Brna in Croatia
- Coordinates: 42°54′22″N 16°51′38″E
- Country: Croatia
- County: Dubrovnik-Neretva County

Brna is a village on the southern coast of the island of Korčula in western Croatia.

In the 19th century, Brna served as an overnight base for fishermen from nearby Smokvica, and had a pier that was used for the export of wine. During the 1970s, the village became populated with summer homes for Smokvica residents, and now caters to tourists with a hotel complex and numerous apartments.

To the northwest is the bay of Istruga, with deposits of therapeutic mud.

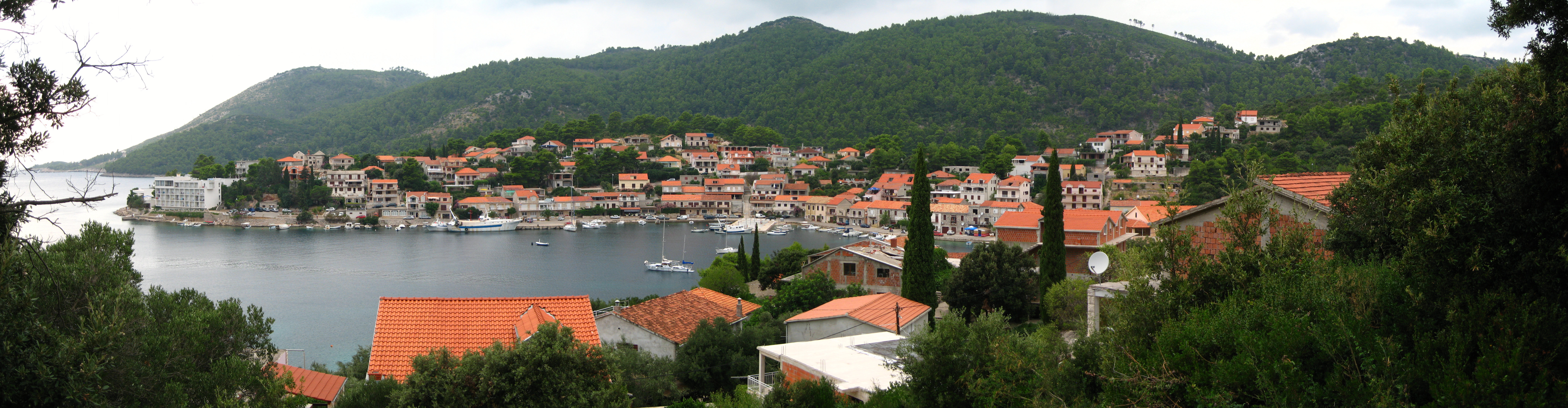
Brna is situated on a sheltered bay that opens to the south-west.

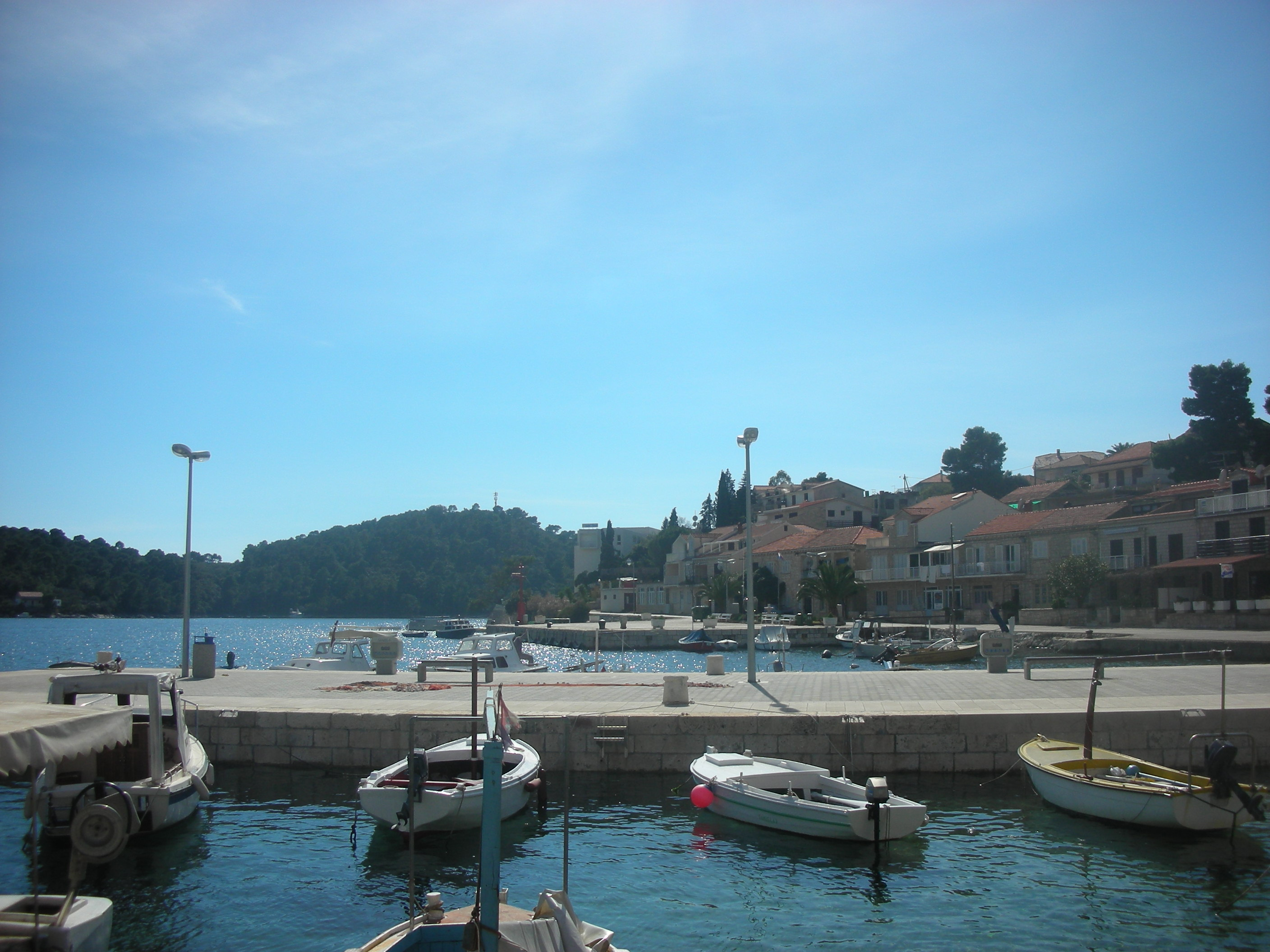
Brna center view on "Mali" and "Veli" Mol

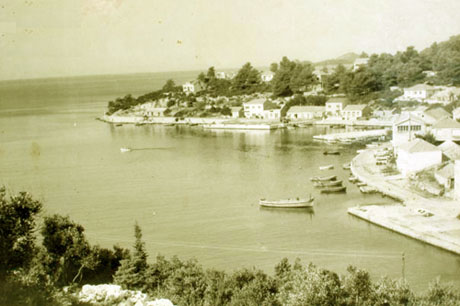
Brna in the 1960s
