= CN Montjuïc =

Spanish sports club, based in Barcelona

- Founded: 1944
- League: 3ª División
- Arena: Montjuïc, Barcelona
- Colors
- Head coach: Joan Ballart
- Manager: Ivaylo Patchaliev
- Championships: 8 Spanish leagues
- Website: Official website

Club Natació Montjuïc is a Spanish sports club from Barcelona established in 1944. The club has sections of swimming. diving, tennis, triathlon, track and field, pétanque and water polo.

== Water polo ==
In water polo, Montjuïc won eight national championships between 1972 and 1986, and it reached the final of the 1979 European Cup and the 1983 Cup Winners' Cup, lost respectively to Orvosegyetem SC and CSKA Moscow.

=== Titles ===
- División de Honor
  - 1972, 1976, 1977, 1978, 1979, 1984, 1885, 1986

=== Notable former players ===
- (Spain) Sergio López
- (Spain) Salva Gómez
- (Spain) Manuel Silvestre
- (Spain) Ángel Andreo
- (Spain) Daniel Ballart

== Rugby union ==
In the past, CN Montjuïc had a rugby union section, which was disbanded in 2003.
