= Óscar Carrillo =

Peruvian actor and director (1965–2025)

- Born: October 28, 1965; Lima, Peru
- Died: June 26, 2025 (aged 59); Lima, Peru
- Occupations: Actor, theatre director
- Spouse: Natalia Torres Vilar (1997–2025)
- Children: Andrés Carrillo Torres; Alejandro Carrillo Torres

Óscar Eduardo Carrillo Vértiz (August 29, 1965 – June 26, 2025) was a Peruvian actor and director of theatre, television and Peruvian cinema who starred in the television series Tatán and the soap opera Los de arriba y los de abajo. He died on June 26, 2025, at the age of 59.

== Filmography ==
=== Television ===
==== As an actor ====
- Bolero (1993)
- Tatán (1994) as Luis D Unián Dulanto "Tatán".
- Those Above and Those Below (1994) as Ulises Fiestas.
- The Ones and the Others (1995) as Alejandro Borja.
- Tribes of the Street (1996) as Commander Mendieta
- Everything is Bought, Everything is Sold (1997) as Rafael Muro.
- People as One (1999–2000)
- Sarita Colonia (2002) as Raúl
- Eva del Edén (2004) as Hernando de Palomino
- Un amor indomable (2007) (telenovela)
- La fuerza Fénix (2008) as Commander Eléspuru.
- Graffiti (telenovela) (2008–2009) as Nicolás Silva.
- Clave uno: Médicos en alerta (2009–2010) as Domingo Fuentes.
- Tribulación (series) (2010) as Commander Céspedes.
- Doors to the Beyond (2011), Episode "The Grandfather" as Seer Mario Acosta.
- La Perricholi (2011) as Constable Pulido.
- Grau, Knight of the Seas (2014)
- Our History (2015) as Francisco Robles.
- Ramírez (2015) as Commander Párraga
- Mis tres Marías (2016) as Gaspar Rivera Benítez # 2
- Just a Mother (2017) as Nero Berreta.
- Witchy Eyes (2018–2019) as Mario Gavilán.
- In Alicia's Skin (2019) as Juan Hipólito Roque.
- La otra orilla (2020) as Martín Salazar.
- Princesses (2020–2021) as César Ortiz de Guzmán.
- Luz de luna (2021–2023) as Ramiro Zevallos.
- Tu nombre y el mío (2024) as Marcial Montero.

==== As Director ====
- Gabriela (Telenovela) 1998 (Stage Direction)
- Baila Reggaeton (Miniseries) 2007 (Stage Direction)
- Conversando con la Luna (Telenovela) Seasons 1, 2 and 3 (2012-2014)
- Nuestra Historia (Series) 2015 (Direction)

=== Film ===
- Proof of Life (2000) as Trial Honcho by Taylor Hackford
- And If I Saw You, I Don't Remember (2003) as Alberto by Miguel Barreda Delgado
- Coca Mama (2004) by Marianne Eyde
- Both (2005) by Lisset Barcellos
- Eyes of Fire (2006) by Gustavo Fernández
- A Shadow Ahead (2007) by Augusto Tamayo San Román
- The Darkness (2008) (suspended project)
- The City of Gardens (renamed as 186 Dollars to Freedom) (2011) by Camilo Vila
- Knives in the Sky (2013) by Chicho Durant
- F27 (2014) by Willy Combe
- Disappear (2015) by Dorian Fernández-Moris
- Bleed, Scream, Beat! (2017) by Aldo Miyashiro
- Django: Blood of My Blood (2018) by Aldo Salvini
- La Pampa (2023) by Dorian Fernández-Moris

=== Theater ===
==== As an actor ====
- The Bell-Belled Hat by Luigi Pirandello (1991) as Ciampa
- Life Is a Dream by Pedro Calderón de la Barca (1992) as Segismundo
- Yerma by Federico García Lorca (1992) as Juan
- Vladimir by Alfonso Santistevan (1994) as Che Guevara
- Do You Want to Be with Me? by Augusto Cabada (1994) as Alberto Pflucker
- Tell Me We Have Time by César de María (1997)
- Malayerba by Rafael Mendizabal (1997) as Dimas
- Qoillor Ritti by Delfina Paredes (1999) as Matalinares
- Return to the Desert by Bernard-Marie Koltès (1999)
- Unidentified Human Remains by Brad Fraser (2000) as Bernie
- A Sunday Afternoon by Maritza Núñez (2000) as André Breton
- Popcorn by Ben Elton (2001) as Wayne Hudson
- Chance Encounter by Alonso Cueto (2002) as Bobby
- Julius Caesar by William Shakespeare (2005) as Brutus
- The Feast of the Goat by Mario Vargas Llosa (2007)
- Revelry by Nicolás Yerovi (2010) as Benito
- The Story of a Horse by Mark Rozovsky (2012) as "Equerry"
- "Hemingway" by Maritza Núñez (2014) as "Hemingway"
- "The Liberator's Horse" by Alfonso Santistevan (2015) as "The Professor"
- "The Crowd" by Nick Rongjun Yu (2016)
- "A Mystery, a Passion" by Aldo Miyashiro (2018)

==== As Director ====
- "Luther" by John Osborne (1994)
- "Educating Rita" by Willy Russell (1995)
- "Three Postmodern Loves" by Eduardo Adrianzén (1998) "Premiere"
- "The Third Age of Youth" by Eduardo Adrianzén (1999) "Premiere"
- "The Doves' Nest" by Eduardo Adrianzén (2000) Premiere
- A Kind of Absence by Marcela Robles (2000) Premiere
- Thorns by Eduardo Adrianzén (2001) Premiere
- Two for the Road by César de María (2002) Premiere
- The Cherry Orchard by Anton Chekhov (2003)
- Don Perlimplín's Love for Belisa in His Garden by Federico García Lorca (2005)
- The Cisura de Silvio by Víctor Falcón (2006) Premiere
- Extremes by William Mastrosimone (2007)
- Heraud, the Flying Heart by Eduardo Adrianzén (2009) Premiere
- Libertinos by Eduardo Adrianzén (2012) Premiere
- Eternity in Their Eyes by Eduardo Adrianzén (2013) Premiere
- Silencio Sísmico by Eduardo Adrianzén (2016) Premiere
- Cinema Frontera based on Cinema Sderot by Felipe Curiel (2016) Microteatro Project
- Salto en Sepia based on Fragmento de Teatro II by Samuel Beckett (2020)
- Rosmary and the Liberator by Eduardo Adrianzén (2021) produced by the Gran Teatro Nacional
