= Svilen Piralkov =

Spanish water polo player (born 1975)

Personal information
- Born: 8 April 1975 (age 51) Sofia, Bulgaria

Sport
- Sport: Water polo
Medal record
Representing Spain
World Championships
Bronze medal – third place	2007 Melbourne	Team competition

Svilen Piralkov (born 8 April 1975) is a Spanish water polo player who competed in the 2008 Summer Olympics.

== See also ==
- List of World Aquatics Championships medalists in water polo
