= División de Honor de Waterpolo =

Spanish water polo league

División de Honor
- Current season, competition or edition: 2025–26 División de Honor de Waterpolo
- Sport: Water polo
- Founded: 1912
- No. of teams: 12
- Country: Spain
- Most recent champion: Atlètic-Barceloneta (2025–26)
- Most titles: CN Barcelona (59 titles overall)
- Broadcasters: Teledeporte, RTVE Play, Esport3
- Level on pyramid: 1
- Relegation to: Primera División
- Domestic cup: Copa del Rey
- Website: lewaterpolo.com

The Spanish water polo championship has been contested since 1912. The current league format was introduced in 1965. The top division is currently known as the División de Honor and consists of twelve clubs. The current champions (2025–26 season) are CN Atlètic-Barceloneta from Barcelona.

== Competition ==
=== Format ===
The División de Honor season takes place between October and May, with every team playing each other home and away for a total of 22 matches. Points are awarded according to the following:

- 3 points for a win
- 1 points for a draw

The team with the highest number of points at the end of 22 rounds of matches become champions.

=== Promotion and relegation ===
The bottom team in the standings at the end of the season is relegated to Primera División, while the top team from Primera División is promoted.

== List of winners ==
=== Spanish Championship (1912–1973) ===
- 1912 Barcelona
- 1913 Barcelona (2)
- 1914 Barcelona (3)
- 1915 Barcelona (4)
- 1916 Barcelona (5)
- 1917 Barcelona (6)
- 1918 Barcelona (7)
- 1919 Barcelona (8)
- 1920 Barcelona (9)
- 1921 Barcelona (10)
- 1922–1941: No official competition
- 1942 Barcelona (11)
- 1943 Barcelona (12)
- 1944 Barcelona (13)
- 1945 Barcelona (14)
- 1946 Barcelona (15)
- 1947 Barcelona (16)
- 1948 Barcelona (17)
- 1949 Barcelona (18)
- 1950 Barcelona (19)
- 1951 Barcelona (20)
- 1952 Barcelona (21)
- 1953 Barcelona (22)
- 1954 Barcelona (23)
- 1955 Barcelona (24)
- 1956 Barcelona (25)
- 1957 Barcelona (26)
- 1958 Barcelona (27)
- 1959 Barcelona (28)
- 1960 Barcelona (29)
- 1961 Barcelona (30)
- 1962 Barcelona (31)
- 1963 Barcelona (32)
- 1964 Barcelona (33)
- 1965 Barcelona (34)
- 1966 Barcelona (35)
- 1967 Barcelona (36)
- 1968 Barcelona (37)
- 1969 Barcelona (38)
- 1970 Barcelona (39)
- 1971 Barcelona (40)
- 1972 Montjuïc
- 1973 Atlètic-Barceloneta

=== Spanish League (1965–present) ===
- 1965–66 Barcelona
- 1966–67 Barcelona (2)
- 1967–68 Barcelona (3)
- 1968–69 Barcelona (4)
- 1969–70 Atlètic-Barceloneta
- 1970–71 Barcelona (5)
- 1971–72 Barcelona (6)
- 1972–73 Atlètic-Barceloneta (2)
- 1973–74 Atlètic-Barceloneta (3)
- 1974–75 Barcelona (7)
- 1975–76 Montjuïc
- 1976–77 Montjuïc (2)
- 1977–78 Montjuïc (3)
- 1978–79 Montjuïc (4)
- 1979–80 Barcelona (8)
- 1980–81 Barcelona (9)
- 1981–82 Barcelona (10)
- 1982–83 Barcelona (11)
- 1983–84 Montjuïc (5)
- 1984–85 Montjuïc (6)
- 1985–86 Montjuïc (7)
- 1986–87 Barcelona (12)
- 1987–88 Catalunya
- 1988–89 Catalunya (2)
- 1989–90 Catalunya (3)
- 1990–91 Barcelona (13)
- 1991–92 Catalunya (4)
- 1992–93 Catalunya (5)
- 1993–94 Catalunya (6)
- 1994–95 Barcelona (14)
- 1995–96 Barcelona (15)
- 1996–97 Barcelona (16)
- 1997–98 Catalunya (7)
- 1998–99 Real Canoe
- 1999–00 Real Canoe (2)
- 2000–01 Atlètic-Barceloneta (4)
- 2001–02 Barcelona (17)
- 2002–03 Atlètic-Barceloneta (5)
- 2003–04 Barcelona (18)
- 2004–05 Barcelona (19)
- 2005–06 Atlètic-Barceloneta (6)
- 2006–07 Atlètic-Barceloneta (7)
- 2007–08 Atlètic-Barceloneta (8)
- 2008–09 Atlètic-Barceloneta (9)
- 2009–10 Atlètic-Barceloneta (10)
- 2010–11 Atlètic-Barceloneta (11)
- 2011–12 Atlètic-Barceloneta (12)
- 2012–13 Atlètic-Barceloneta (13)
- 2013–14 Atlètic-Barceloneta (14)
- 2014–15 Atlètic-Barceloneta (15)
- 2015–16 Atlètic-Barceloneta (16)
- 2016–17 Atlètic-Barceloneta (17)
- 2017–18 Atlètic-Barceloneta (18)
- 2018–19 Atlètic-Barceloneta (19)
- 2019–20 Atlètic-Barceloneta (20)
- 2020–21 Atlètic-Barceloneta (21)
- 2021–22 Atlètic-Barceloneta (22)
- 2022–23 Atlètic-Barceloneta (23)
- 2023–24 Atlètic-Barceloneta (24)
- 2024–25 Atlètic-Barceloneta (25)
- 2025–26 Atlètic-Barceloneta (26)

== Performance by club ==
=== Spanish Championship ===
Team	Titles	Years won
Barcelona	40	1912, 1913, 1914, 1915, 1916, 1917, 1918, 1919, 1920, 1921, 1942, 1943, 1944, 1945, 1946, 1947, 1948, 1949, 1950, 1951, 1952, 1953, 1954, 1955, 1956, 1957, 1958, 1959, 1960, 1961, 1962, 1963, 1964, 1965, 1966, 1967, 1968, 1969, 1970, 1971
Atlètic-Barceloneta	1	1973
Montjuïc	1	1972

=== Spanish League ===
Team	Titles	Years won
Atlètic-Barceloneta	26	1969–70, 1972–73, 1973–74, 2000–01, 2002–03, 2005–06, 2006–07, 2007–08, 2008–09, 2009–10, 2010–11, 2011–12, 2012–13, 2013–14, 2014–15, 2015–16, 2016–17, 2017–18, 2018–19, 2019–20, 2020–21, 2021–22, 2022–23, 2023–24, 2024–25, 2025–26
Barcelona	19	1965–66, 1966–67, 1967–68, 1968–69, 1970–71, 1971–72, 1974–75, 1979–80, 1980–81, 1981–82, 1982–83, 1986–87, 1990–91, 1994–95, 1995–96, 1996–97, 2001–02, 2003–04, 2004–05
Montjuïc	7	1975–76, 1976–77, 1977–78, 1978–79, 1983–84, 1984–85, 1985–86
Catalunya	7	1987–88, 1988–89, 1989–90, 1991–92, 1992–93, 1993–94, 1997–98
Real Canoe	2	1998–99, 1999–00

== See also ==
- Copa del Rey
- Supercopa de España
- División de Honor Femenina de Waterpolo
