= Real Canoe NC =

Multi sport club, based in Madrid

Real Canoe Natación Club
- Founded: 1930
- League: 2015–16, División de Honor, 3rd
- Based in: Madrid
- Colors: Blue, Yellow
- President: Ricardo Camacho García
- Championships: 2 – (Waterpolo), 3 – (Women's Basketball), 5 – (Rugby)
- Website: realcanoe.es

Active departments of Real Canoe
Basketball	Diving	Rugby	Synchronized swimming
Swimming	Water polo	The club

Real Canoe Natación Club is a multisport club based in Madrid, Spain. The club was founded in 1930.

== History ==
The club was founded in 1930 via a merger of "Club Natación Atlético" & "Canoë Club." Mr Julián López became the club's first chairman.

Currently, the club hosts multiple sports facilities and teams. Though it began as a swim club, over the years the club has added a number of additional sports such diving, water polo, basketball, rugby and synchronized swimming. Other activities, including mountaineering, canoeing, rowing and skiing have also, at one point or another, formed part of the club's history.

== Facilities ==
After using borrowed facilities to hold competitions, on May 17, 1961, Baldomero Sol took office as president with the intention of obtaining proprietary facilities by acquiring a plot in the Estrella neighborhood and beginning construction a year later. In 1969, the sports center was inaugurated. It includes several swimming pools, basketball and squash courts, gyms for both club members and federated athletes, changing rooms and a cafeteria.

== Sports sections ==
=== Water polo ===
The water polo department was established roughly at the same time with the club's foundation. Real Canoe water polo is a leading professional sports team, competing in multiple FINA World Championships and placing numerous players on Olympic teams including Mario José García and Balázs Szirányi Somogyi. Members of Real Canoe Water Polo played for Spain, winning fourth place in the 1984 Olympic Games, a silver medal in the 1992 Olympic Games, and a gold medal in the 1992 Olympic Games. Real Canoe started Spain's elite youth Water Polo Training program in 1982.

==== Men's ====
Played in División de Honor de Waterpolo

- División de Honor: 2
  - 1999 & 2000

=== Basketball ===
The basketball department was established in 1940.

==== Men's ====
From 1957 to 1965, Real Canoe played in 1ª División, the Spanish top basketball league.

==== Women's ====
Plays in LF2

Titles

- 3 Leagues: 1984, 1985, 1986
- 1 Cup: 1996

=== Rugby ===
==== Men's ====
Played in División de Honor de Rugby

Titles

- 5 leagues: 1971, 1972, 1973, 2000 i 2009
- 10 Copa del Rey: 1964, 1966, 1970, 1971, 1974, 2001, 2002, 2003, 2008 & 2009
- 1 Spanish Supercup: 2009

=== Swimming ===
The swimming department was established at the same time with the club's foundation.

=== Diving ===
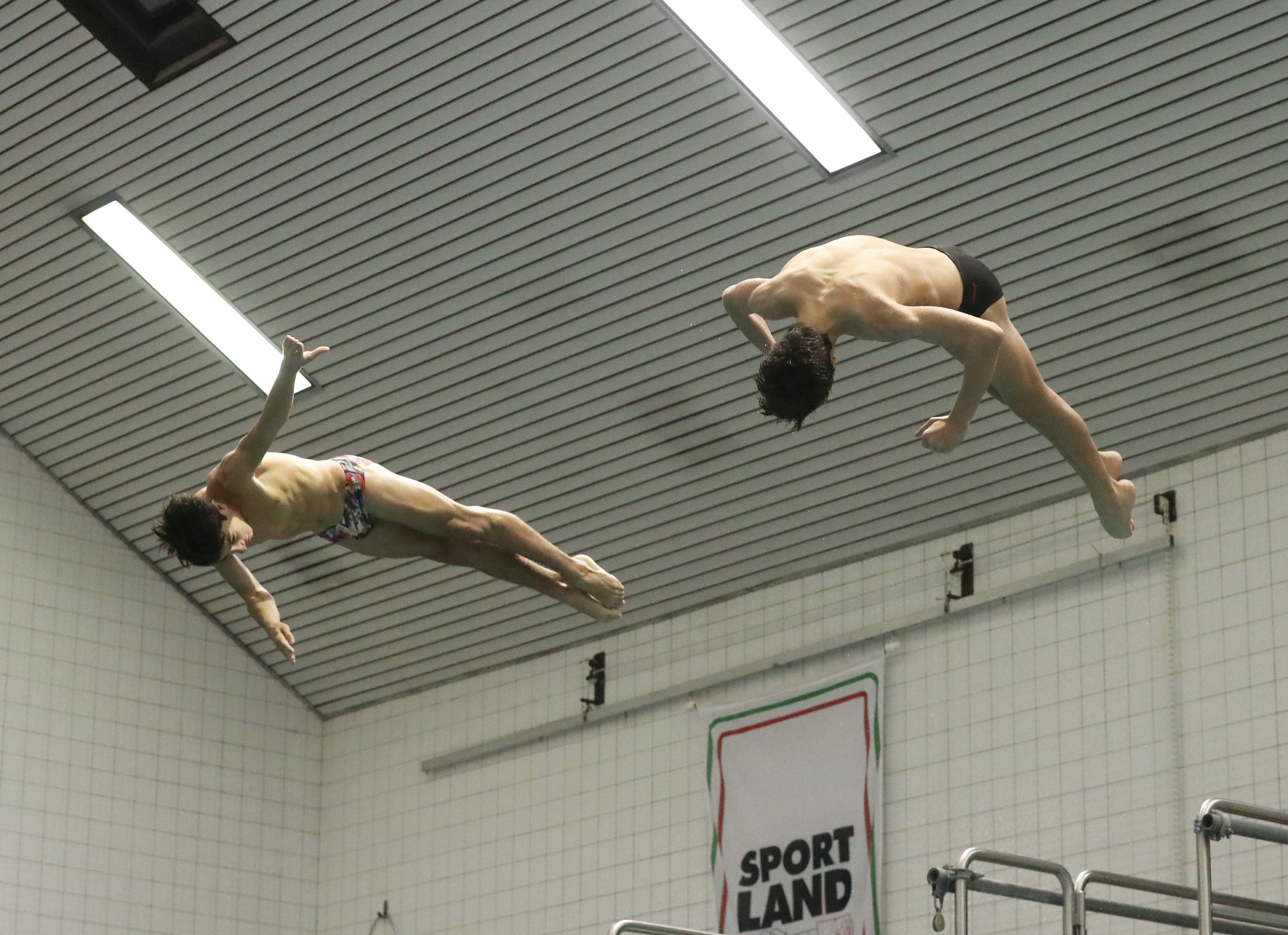
Real Canoe NC synchronous divers

The diving department was established roughly at the same time with the club's foundation.

=== Synchronised swimming ===
The synchronised swimming department was established roughly at the same time with the club's foundation.
