= CN Atlètic-Barceloneta =

Spanish water polo club from Barcelona

Atlètic-Barceloneta
- Founded: 1992 (1913)
- League: División de Honor
- Arena: Piscina Sant Sebastià, Barcelona
- Colors
- President: Bernat Antràs
- Manager: Chus Martín
- Championships: 2 LEN Champions League; 1 LEN Super Cup; 1 Spanish Championship; 24 Spanish Leagues; 20 Spanish Cups; 15 Spanish Super Cups
- Website: cnab.cat/

Club Natació Atlètic-Barceloneta (CNAB) is a Spanish professional water polo club from Barcelona, established in 1913.

The club is the result of the merge of Club Natació Atlètic, founded in 1913, and Barceloneta Amateur Club, founded in 1929 and renamed later on as Club Natació Atlètic-Barceloneta (CNAB). The club is located in the coastline neighbourhood of Barceloneta.

Atlètic-Barceloneta is one of the most successful water polo clubs in Spain, having won 23 league titles, 19 national cups and 15 national super cups. The team has also won the LEN Champions League in 2014.

== Honours ==
International

- LEN Champions League (2)

2013–14, 2025–26

- LEN Super Cup (1)

2014

National

- Spanish Championship (1)

1973

- Spanish League (23)

1969-70, 1972-73, 1973-74, 2000-01, 2002-03, 2005-06, 2006-07, 2007-08, 2008-09, 2009-10, 2010-11, 2011-12, 2012-13, 2013-14, 2014-15, 2015-16, 2016-17, 2017-18, 2018-19, 2019-20, 2020-21, 2021-22, 2022-23, 2023-24, 2024-25

- Copa del Rey (20)

2000, 2001, 2004, 2006, 2007, 2008, 2009, 2010, 2013, 2014, 2015, 2016, 2017, 2018, 2019, 2020, 2021, 2022, 2023, 2024

- Supercopa de España (15)

2001, 2003, 2004, 2006, 2007, 2008, 2009, 2010, 2011, 2013, 2015, 2016, 2017, 2018, 2019

Regional

- Copa de Cataluña (9)

2006–07, 2007–08, 2008–09, 2009–10, 2010–11, 2012–13, 2013–14, 2014–15, 2016–17
