= CN Barcelona =

Spanish multi-sports club

Barcelona
- Founded: 1907; 119 years ago
- League: División de Honor
- Arena: Nova Escollera, Barcelona
- Colors: Blue, white
- President: Bernat Antràs
- Championships: 1 European Cup; 2 LEN Trophies; 40 Spanish Championships; 19 Spanish Leagues; 8 Spanish Cups
- Website: cnb.cat

Club Natació Barcelona is a Spanish multi-sports club from Barcelona established in 1907. It is active in athletics, diving, karate, petanca, pilota, rugby, sailing, swimming, water polo, and triathlon.

Barcelona is the most successful club in Spanish water polo history with overall 59 national titles (40 Spanish Championships and 19 Spanish Leagues). The club has also won European Cup in 1982 and the LEN Trophy in 1995 and 2004.

== History ==
CN Barcelona was founded on 10 November 1907, by Bernat Picornell and a group of 16 friends who regularly attended the Gimnasio Solé, thus becoming the first swimming club in Spain. It played a key role in the creation of the Catalan and Spanish Swimming Federations, as well as the Spanish Olympic Committee, which allowed the first Spanish swimmers, all from the CNB, to participate in the 1920 Olympic Games in Antwerp.

It is also the oldest water polo club, playing its first match against a crew of an English ship on 12 July 1908.

== Titles ==
- European Cup (1)

1982

- LEN Trophy (2)

1995, 2004

- Spanish Championship (40)

1912, 1913, 1914, 1915, 1916, 1917, 1918, 1919, 1920, 1921, 1942, 1943, 1944, 1945, 1946, 1947, 1948, 1949, 1950, 1951, 1952, 1953, 1954, 1955, 1956, 1957, 1958, 1959, 1960, 1961, 1962, 1963, 1964, 1965, 1966, 1967, 1968, 1969, 1970, 1971

- Spanish League (19)

1965–66, 1966–67, 1967–68, 1968–69, 1970–71, 1971–72, 1974–75, 1979–80, 1980–81, 1981–82, 1982–83, 1986–87, 1990–91, 1994–95, 1995–96, 1996–97, 2001–02, 2003–04, 2004–05

- Copa del Rey (8)

1989, 1991, 1995, 1996, 1999, 2002, 2003, 2011

== Notable members ==
- Joaquín Cuadrada
- Josep Marín
- Valentí Massana
- Maria Aumacellas
- Maria Vasco
