= 2014 Women's European Water Polo Championship squads =

This article shows all participating water polo team squads at the 2014 Women's European Water Polo Championship, held in Hungary from 16 to 26 July 2014.

== France ==
No.	Name	Date of birth	Position	Height	Weight
1	Lou Counil	7 November 1985	Goalkeeper		
2	Estelle Millot	21 December 1993			
3	Lea Bachelier	13 February 1993			
4	Clementine Valverde	23 September 1992			
5	Louise Guillet	31 January 1986			
6	Geraldine Mahieu	15 September 1993			
7	Charlaine Clomes	23 July 1993			
8	Marion Tardy	12 July 1993			
9	Oceane Notreami	19 November 1993			
10	Aurore Sacre	13 April 1993			
11	Clemence Clerc	18 February 1991			
12	Audrey Daule	6 May 1993			
13	Lorene Derenty	4 September 1994	Goalkeeper		

== Great Britain ==
No.	Name	Date of birth	Position	Height	Weight
1	Rosemary Morris	31 January 1986	Goalkeeper	180 cm (5 ft 11 in)	69 kg (152 lb)
2	Chloe Wilcox	20 December 1986		172 cm (5 ft 8 in)	62 kg (137 lb)
3	Katie Hesketh	18 May 1994		170 cm (5 ft 7 in)	69 kg (152 lb)
4	Ciara Gibson-Byrne	3 December 1992			
5	Aine Hoy	16 October 1987			
6	Claire Nixon	14 November 1993			
7	Rosemary Huck	24 March 1997			
8	Hazel Musgrove	6 February 1989			
9	Peggy Etiebet	19 March 1976			
10	Angela Winstanley-Smith	5 August 1985		179 cm (5 ft 10 in)	66 kg (146 lb)
11	Francesca Clayton	7 January 1990		170 cm (5 ft 7 in)	69 kg (152 lb)
12	Pippa Temple-Craik	16 March 1994			
13	Jade Smith	16 February 1993	Goalkeeper		

== Greece ==
No.	Name	Date of birth	Position	Height	Weight
1	Eleni Kouvdou	9 August 1989	Goalkeeper	172 cm (5 ft 8 in)	63 kg (139 lb)
2	Christina Tsoukala	8 July 1991		185 cm (6 ft 1 in)	78 kg (172 lb)
3	Vasiliki Diamantopoulou	11 March 1993			
4	Margarita Plevritou	17 November 1994			
5	Stefania Charalampidi	19 May 1995		183 cm (6 ft 0 in)	70 kg (150 lb)
6	Alkisti Avramidou	26 February 1988		170 cm (5 ft 7 in)	59 kg (130 lb)
7	Alexandra Asimaki	28 June 1988		170 cm (5 ft 7 in)	64 kg (141 lb)
8	Antigoni Roumpesi	19 July 1983		178 cm (5 ft 10 in)	80 kg (180 lb)
9	Ioanna Charalampidi	19 May 1995			
10	Triantafyllia Manolioudaki	19 March 1986		170 cm (5 ft 7 in)	62 kg (137 lb)
11	Eleftheria Plevritou	23 April 1997			
12	Alkistis Benekou	31 January 1994			
13	Chrysoula Diamantopoulou	22 September 1995	Goalkeeper	183 cm (6 ft 0 in)	70 kg (150 lb)

== Hungary ==
No.	Name	Date of birth	Position	Height	Weight
1	Flora Bolonyai	5 April 1991	Goalkeeper	179 cm (5 ft 10 in)	69 kg (152 lb)
2	Dora Czigany	23 October 1992		175 cm (5 ft 9 in)	70 kg (150 lb)
3	Dora Antal	9 September 1993		168 cm (5 ft 6 in)	60 kg (130 lb)
4	Dora Agnes Kisteleki	11 May 1983			
5	Gabriella Szucs	7 March 1988		183 cm (6 ft 0 in)	74 kg (163 lb)
6	Orsolya Takacs	20 May 1985		190 cm (6 ft 3 in)	83 kg (183 lb)
7	Hanna Kisteleki	10 March 1991			
8	Rita Keszthelyi	10 December 1991		177 cm (5 ft 10 in)	67 kg (148 lb)
9	Ildiko Toth	23 April 1987		175 cm (5 ft 9 in)	70 kg (150 lb)
10	Barbara Bujka	5 September 1986		174 cm (5 ft 9 in)	84 kg (185 lb)
11	Dora Csabai	20 April 1989		174 cm (5 ft 9 in)	84 kg (185 lb)
12	Anna Krisztina Illes	21 February 1994			
13	Edina Gangl	25 June 1990	Goalkeeper	178 cm (5 ft 10 in)	69 kg (152 lb)

== Italy ==
No.	Name	Date of birth	Position	Height	Weight
1	Giulia Gorlero	26 September 1990	Goalkeeper		
2	Federica Radicchi	21 December 1988		168 cm (5 ft 6 in)	71 kg (157 lb)
3	Arianna Garibotti	9 December 1989			
4	Elisa Queirolo	6 March 1991			
5	Silvia Motta	31 January 1988		168 cm (5 ft 6 in)	59 kg (130 lb)
6	Rosaria Aiello	12 May 1989			
7	Tania Di Mario	5 April 1979		168 cm (5 ft 6 in)	59 kg (130 lb)
8	Roberta Bianconi	8 July 1989		175 cm (5 ft 9 in)	74 kg (163 lb)
9	Giulia Enrica Emmolo	16 October 1991		171 cm (5 ft 7 in)	66 kg (146 lb)
10	Valeria M.G. Palmieri	18 October 1993			
11	Aleksandra Cotti	13 December 1988			
12	Teresa Frassinetti	24 December 1985		178 cm (5 ft 10 in)	72 kg (159 lb)
13	Laura Teani	13 March 1991	Goalkeeper	168 cm (5 ft 6 in)	71 kg (157 lb)

== Netherlands ==
No.	Name	Date of birth	Position	Height	Weight
1	Anne Heinis	20 May 1987	Goalkeeper		
2	Yasemin Smit	21 November 1984		179 cm (5 ft 10 in)	73 kg (161 lb)
3	Dagmar Genee	31 January 1989		178 cm (5 ft 10 in)	
4	Sabrina van der Sloot	16 March 1991			
5	Amarens Genee	22 February 1991		179 cm (5 ft 10 in)	73 kg (161 lb)
6	Nomi Stomphorst	23 August 1992		172 cm (5 ft 8 in)	63 kg (139 lb)
7	Marloes Nijhuis	14 March 1991			
8	Vivian Sevenich	28 February 1993			
9	Maud Megens	6 February 1996		178 cm (5 ft 10 in)	
10	Laura van der Graaf	29 December 1994		178 cm (5 ft 10 in)	
11	Lieke Klaassen	23 April 1991		182 cm (6 ft 0 in)	96 kg (212 lb)
12	Leonie van der Molen	25 May 1987		178 cm (5 ft 10 in)	
13	Debby Willemsz	10 May 1994	Goalkeeper	172 cm (5 ft 8 in)	63 kg (139 lb)

== Russia ==
No.	Name	Date of birth	Position	Height	Weight
1	Anastasia Verkhoglyadova	12 June 1995	Goalkeeper		
2	Olga Trotskaya	6 July 1995			
3	Ekaterina Prokofyeva	13 March 1991		166 cm (5 ft 5 in)	63 kg (139 lb)
4	Elvina Karimova	25 March 1994			
5	Kseniia Krimer	19 July 1992			
6	Valeriia Kolmakova	16 October 1995			
7	Nadezhda Iarondaykina	30 November 1994			
8	Maria Borisova	28 July 1997		170 cm (5 ft 7 in)	55 kg (121 lb)
9	Evgeniia Abdriziakova	7 August 1988		167 cm (5 ft 6 in)	50 kg (110 lb)
10	Anna Grineva	31 January 1988			
11	Evgeniya Ivanova	26 July 1987			
12	Daria Ryzhkova	8 February 1995			
13	Anna Karnaukh	31 August 1993	Goalkeeper	170 cm (5 ft 7 in)	55 kg (121 lb)

== Spain ==
No.	Name	Date of birth	Position	Height	Weight
1	Laura Ester Ramos	22 January 1990	Goalkeeper	170 cm (5 ft 7 in)	56 kg (123 lb)
2	Marta Bach Pascual	17 February 1993		176 cm (5 ft 9 in)	66 kg (146 lb)
3	Anna Espar Llaquet	8 January 1993		180 cm (5 ft 11 in)	66 kg (146 lb)
4	Roser Tarrago Aymerich	25 March 1993		170 cm (5 ft 7 in)	59 kg (130 lb)
5	Matilde Ortiz Reyes	16 September 1990		174 cm (5 ft 9 in)	64 kg (141 lb)
6	Jennifer Pareja Lisalde	8 May 1984		174 cm (5 ft 9 in)	63 kg (139 lb)
7	Lorena Miranda Dorado	7 April 1991		174 cm (5 ft 9 in)	73 kg (161 lb)
8	Maria Del Pilar Pena Carrasco	4 April 1994		188 cm (6 ft 2 in)	90 kg (200 lb)
9	Andrea Blas Martinez	14 February 1992		173 cm (5 ft 8 in)	81 kg (179 lb)
10	Ona Meseguer Flaque	20 February 1988		167 cm (5 ft 6 in)	62 kg (137 lb)
11	Maria Carmen Garcia Godoy	17 October 1990		188 cm (6 ft 2 in)	90 kg (200 lb)
12	Laura Lopez Ventosa	13 January 1988		170 cm (5 ft 7 in)	63 kg (139 lb)
13	Patricia Herrera Fernandez	9 February 1993	Goalkeeper		
