= 2016 Women's LEN Super Cup =

Water polo match

The 2016 Women's LEN Super Cup was the 11th edition of the Women's LEN Super Cup an annual water polo match organized by the LEN and contested by the reigning champions of the two main European club competitions.

The match was played between the Euro League Champion (CN Sabadell) and the LEN Trophy Champion (CN Mataró) at the CN Barcelona swimming pool in Barcelona on November 6, 2016.

== Match ==
Time is CET (UTC+1).

6 November 2016; 12:00	Report	CN Sabadell	10–9	CN Mataró	Barcelona, Spain; Referees: Gabriella Várkonyi (HUN), Maro Savinovic (CRO)
6 November 2016; 12:00	Report	Score by quarters: 1–1, 3–3, 3–2, 3–3			Barcelona, Spain; Referees: Gabriella Várkonyi (HUN), Maro Savinovic (CRO)
6 November 2016; 12:00	Report	Forca 4 A. Espar 2 B. Ortiz, Tabani, Cordobés, Doménech 1	Goals	Zablith, Cambray, López 2 Gibson, Bach, Meseguer 1	Barcelona, Spain; Referees: Gabriella Várkonyi (HUN), Maro Savinovic (CRO)

== Squads ==
=== CN Mataró La Sirena ===
No.	Name	Date of birth	Position
1	(Spain) Cristina Terrado	September 9, 1997	Goalkeeper
2	(New Zealand) Liana Dance	April 18, 1998	
3	(Brazil) Marina Zablith	March 4, 1987	Driver
4	(Spain) María Bernabé	April 9, 2001	
5	(Spain) Julia Nieto	May 10, 2000	
6	(Spain) Alba Bonamusa	February 8, 1999	
7	(Spain) Clara Cambray	October 10, 1996	
8	(United Kingdom) Ciara Gibson-Byrne	December 3, 1992	Wing
9	(Spain) Marta Bach	February 17, 1993	Centre back
10	(Spain) Ona Meseguer	February 20, 1988	Wing
11	(Spain) Julia Soler	September 22, 2000	
12	(Spain) Laura López	January 13, 1988	Driver
13	(Netherlands) Debby Willemsz	May 10, 1994	Goalkeeper

Head coach: Florin Bonca

=== CN Sabadell Astralpool ===
No.	Name	Date of birth	Position
1	(Spain) Laura Ester	January 22, 1990	Goalkeeper
2	(Spain) Matilde Ortiz	September 16, 1990	Centre back
3	(Spain) Anni Espar	January 8, 1993	Driver
4	(Spain) Beatriz Ortiz	September 21, 1995	Driver
5	(Italy) Chiara Tabani	August 27, 1994	Centre back
6	(Spain) Paula Leitón	April 27, 2000	Centre forward
7	(Spain) Marina Cordobés	April 28, 1997	All field player
8	(Spain) Maica Garcia	October 17, 1990	Centre forward
9	(Spain) María del Pilar Peña	April 4, 1986	All field player
10	(Spain) Clara Espar	September 29, 1994	All field player
11	(Spain) Olga Doménech	September 21, 1988	Wing
12	(Spain) Judith Forca	June 7, 1996	Wing
13	(Spain) Elena Sánchez	October 20, 1994	Goalkeeper

Head coach: Ignasi Guiu
