= Spain women's Olympic water polo team records and statistics =

This article lists various water polo records and statistics in relation to the Spain women's national water polo team at the Summer Olympics.

The Spain women's national water polo team has participated in 3 of 6 women's water polo tournaments.

== Abbreviations ==
Apps	Appearances	Rk	Rank	Ref	Reference	Cap No.	Water polo cap number
Pos	Playing position	FP	Field player	GK	Goalkeeper	ISHOF	International Swimming Hall of Fame
L/R	Handedness	L	Left-handed	R	Right-handed	Oly debut	Olympic debut in water polo
(C)	Captain	p.	page	pp.	pages		

== Team statistics ==
=== Comprehensive results by tournament ===
Note: Results of Olympic qualification tournaments are not included. Last updated: 5 May 2021.

Legend

- 1st – Champions
- 2nd – Runners-up
- 3rd – Third place
- 4th – Fourth place
- Q – Qualified for forthcoming tournament

Women's team	2000	2004	2008	2012	2016	2020	Years
Spain				2nd	5th	2nd	3
Total teams	6	8	8	8	8	10	

=== Number of appearances ===
Last updated: 11 August 2021.

Women's team	Apps	Record streak	Active streak	Debut	Most recent	Best finish	Confederation
Spain	3	3	3	2012	2020	Runners-up	Europe – LEN

=== Best finishes ===
Last updated: 11 August 2021.

Women's team	Best finish	Apps	Confederation
Spain	Runners-up (2012, 2020)	3	Europe – LEN

=== Finishes in the top four ===
Last updated: 11 August 2021.

Women's team	Total	Champions	Runners-up	Third place	Fourth place	First	Last
Spain	2		2 (2012, 2020)			2012	2020

=== Medal table ===
Last updated: 11 August 2021.

Women's team	Gold	Silver	Bronze	Total
Spain (ESP)	0	2	0	2

== Player statistics ==
=== Multiple appearances ===
The following table is pre-sorted by number of Olympic appearances (in descending order), year of the last Olympic appearance (in ascending order), year of the first Olympic appearance (in ascending order), date of birth (in ascending order), name of the player (in ascending order), respectively.

- Number of four-time Olympians: 0
- Number of three-time Olympians: 0
- Last updated: 26 July 2021.

=== Multiple medalists ===
The following table is pre-sorted by total number of Olympic medals (in descending order), number of Olympic gold medals (in descending order), number of Olympic silver medals (in descending order), year of receiving the last Olympic medal (in ascending order), year of receiving the first Olympic medal (in ascending order), name of the player (in ascending order), respectively.

- Number of three-time Olympic medalists: 0
- Number of two-time Olympic medalists: 6
- Last updated: 10 August 2021.

Legend

- – Hosts

Female athletes who won two or more Olympic medals in water polo
Rk	Player	Birth	Height	Pos	Water polo tournaments					Period (age of first/last)	Medals				Ref
Rk	Player	Birth	Height	Pos	1	2	3	4	5	Period (age of first/last)	G	S	B	T	Ref
1	Marta Bach	1993	1.76 m (5 ft 9 in)	FP	2012	2016	2020			9 years (19/28)	0	2	0	2	
1	Anni Espar	1993	1.80 m (5 ft 11 in)	FP	2012	2016	2020			9 years (19/28)	0	2	0	2	
1	Laura Ester	1990	1.72 m (5 ft 8 in)	GK	2012	2016	2020			9 years (22/31)	0	2	0	2	
1	Maica García	1990	1.88 m (6 ft 2 in)	FP	2012	2016	2020			9 years (21/30)	0	2	0	2	
1	Pili Peña	1986	1.75 m (5 ft 9 in)	FP	2012	2016	2020			9 years (26/35)	0	2	0	2	
1	Roser Tarragó	1993	1.71 m (5 ft 7 in)	FP	2012	2016	2020			9 years (19/28)	0	2	0	2	

=== Top goalscorers ===
The following table is pre-sorted by number of total goals (in descending order), year of the last Olympic appearance (in ascending order), year of the first Olympic appearance (in ascending order), name of the player (in ascending order), respectively.

- Number of goalscorers (40+ goals): 0
- Number of goalscorers (30–39 goals): 1
- Number of goalscorers (20–29 goals): 4
- Last updated: 12 August 2021.

Female players with 20 or more goals at the Olympics
Rk	Player	Birth	L/R	Total goals	Water polo tournaments (goals)					Age of first/last	ISHOF member	Note	Ref
Rk	Player	Birth	L/R	Total goals	1	2	3	4	5	Age of first/last	ISHOF member	Note	Ref
1	Anni Espar	1993	Right	37	2012 (15)	2016 (7)	2020 (15)			19/28			
2	Roser Tarragó	1993	Right	29	2012 (5)	2016 (15)	2020 (9)			19/28			
3	Maica García	1990	Right	27	2012 (7)	2016 (11)	2020 (9)			21/30			
4	Beatriz Ortiz	1995	Right	23	2016 (5)	2020 (18)				21/26			
5	Judith Forca	1996	Left	21	2016 (7)	2020 (14)				20/25			

- Official Results Books (PDF): 2012 (pp. 353–354), 2016 (pp. 206–207), 2020 (pp. 251–252).

=== Goalkeepers ===
The following table is pre-sorted by edition of the Olympics (in ascending order), cap number or name of the goalkeeper (in ascending order), respectively.

Last updated: 1 April 2021.

Abbreviation

- Eff % – Save efficiency (Saves / Shots)

Year	Cap No.	Goalkeeper	Birth	Age	Saves	Shots	Eff %	ISHOF member	Note	Ref
2012 (silver)	1	Laura Ester	1990	22	36	86	41.9%		Starting goalkeeper	
2012 (silver)	13	Ana Copado	1980	32	0	0	—			
2016	1	Laura Ester (2)	1990	26	41	94	43.6%		Starting goalkeeper	
2016	13	Patricia Herrera	1993	23	1	5	20.0%			
Year	Cap No.	Goalkeeper	Birth	Age	Saves	Shots	Eff %	ISHOF member	Note	Ref

- Official Results Books (PDF): 2012 (pp. 353–354), 2016 (pp. 206–207).

=== Top sprinters ===
The following table is pre-sorted by number of total sprints won (in descending order), year of the last Olympic appearance (in ascending order), year of the first Olympic appearance (in ascending order), name of the sprinter (in ascending order), respectively.

* Number of sprinters (30+ sprints won): 0

- Number of sprinters (20–29 sprints won): 1
- Number of sprinters (10–19 sprints won): 1
- Number of sprinters (5–9 sprints won): 0
- Last updated: 15 May 2021.

Abbreviation

- Eff % – Efficiency (Sprints won / Sprints contested)

Female players with 5 or more sprints won at the Olympics
Rk	Sprinter	Birth	Total sprints won	Total sprints contested	Eff %	Water polo tournaments (sprints won / contested)					Age of first/last	ISHOF member	Note	Ref
Rk	Sprinter	Birth	Total sprints won	Total sprints contested	Eff %	1	2	3	4	5	Age of first/last	ISHOF member	Note	Ref
1	Jennifer Pareja	1984	21	24	87.5%	2012 (21/24)					28/28			
2	Roser Tarragó	1993	13	20	65.0%	2012 (0/0)	2016 (13/20)				19/23			

- Official Results Books (PDF): 2012 (pp. 353–354), 2016 (pp. 206–207).

== Coach statistics ==
=== Medals as coach and player ===
The following table is pre-sorted by total number of Olympic medals (in descending order), number of Olympic gold medals (in descending order), number of Olympic silver medals (in descending order), year of winning the last Olympic medal (in ascending order), year of winning the first Olympic medal (in ascending order), name of the person (in ascending order), respectively. Last updated: 5 May 2021.

Spanish water polo player Miki Oca won a silver medal at the 1992 Summer Olympics in Barcelona. Four years later, he won a gold medal at the 1996 Olympics in Atlanta. As a head coach, he guided Spain women's national water polo team to a silver medal at the 2012 London Olympics.

Legend

- Year^{*} – As host team

Rk	Person	Birth	Height	Player				Head coach			Total medals				Ref
Rk	Person	Birth	Height	Age	Men's team	Pos	Medal	Age	Women's team	Medal	G	S	B	T	Ref
1	Miki Oca	1970	1.87 m (6 ft 2 in)	22–26	Spain	FP	1992^{*} (silver) , 1996 (gold)	42	Spain	2012 (silver) , 2020 (silver)	1	3	0	4	

== See also ==
- Spain men's Olympic water polo team records and statistics
- List of women's Olympic water polo tournament records and statistics
- Lists of Olympic water polo records and statistics
- Spain at the Olympics

== Sources ==
=== Official Results Books (IOC) ===
PDF documents in the LA84 Foundation Digital Library:

- Official Results Book – 2000 Olympic Games – Water Polo (download, archive)
- Official Results Book – 2004 Olympic Games – Water Polo (download, archive)
- Official Results Book – 2008 Olympic Games – Water Polo (download, archive)

PDF documents on the FINA website:

- Official Results Book – 2012 Olympic Games – Diving, Swimming, Synchronised Swimming, Water Polo (archive) (pp. 284–507)

PDF documents in the Olympic World Library:

- Official Results Book – 2016 Olympic Games – Water Polo (archive)

PDF documents on the International Olympic Committee website:

- Official Results Book – 2020 Olympic Games – Water Polo (archive)
- Official Results Book – 2024 Olympic Games – Water Polo

=== Official Reports (FINA) ===
PDF documents on the FINA website:

- HistoFINA – Water polo medalists and statistics (as of September 2019) (archive) (p. 56)
- 1870–2020 | 150 years of Water Polo – Evolution of its rules (archive)

=== Official website (IOC) ===
Water polo on the International Olympic Committee website:

- Water polo
- Women's water polo

=== Olympedia ===
Water polo on the Olympedia website:

- Water polo
- Women's water polo
- Athlete count for water polo
- Water polo venues
- Water polo at the 2000 Summer Olympics (women's tournament)
- Water polo at the 2004 Summer Olympics (women's tournament)
- Water polo at the 2008 Summer Olympics (women's tournament)
- Water polo at the 2012 Summer Olympics (women's tournament)
- Water polo at the 2016 Summer Olympics (women's tournament)
- Water polo at the 2020 Summer Olympics (women's tournament)

=== Sports Reference ===
Water polo on the Sports Reference website:

- Country Medal Leaders & Athlete Medal Leaders (1900–2016) (archived)
- Women's water polo (2000–2016) (archived)
- Water polo at the 2000 Summer Games (women's tournament) (archived)
- Water polo at the 2004 Summer Games (women's tournament) (archived)
- Water polo at the 2008 Summer Games (women's tournament) (archived)
- Water polo at the 2012 Summer Games (women's tournament) (archived)
- Water polo at the 2016 Summer Games (women's tournament) (archived)

=== Todor66 ===
Water polo on the Todor66 website:

- Water polo at the Summer Games
- Water polo at the 2000 Summer Olympics (women's tournament, women's qualification)
- Water polo at the 2004 Summer Olympics (women's tournament, women's qualification)
- Water polo at the 2008 Summer Olympics (women's tournament, women's qualification)
- Water polo at the 2012 Summer Olympics (women's tournament, women's qualification)
- Water polo at the 2016 Summer Olympics (women's tournament, women's qualification)
- Water polo at the 2020 Summer Olympics (women's tournament, women's qualification)

=== ISHOF ===
International Swimming Hall of Fame (ISHOF) website:

- Honorees Listed by Category – Water Polo
- Honorees Listed by Category – Coaches
- Honorees Listed by Category – Contributors
- Honorees by Country
- Honorees By Last Name
