= 2022 FINA Women's Water Polo World League =

18th edition of the annual women's international water polo tournament

- League: FINA Water Polo World League
- Sport: Water polo
- Duration: 25 January – 6 November

Super Final
- Finals champions: Spain (1st title)
- Runners-up: Hungary
- Finals MVP: (Hungary) Rita Keszthelyi

FINA Women's Water Polo World League seasons
- ← 2020 2023 (World Cup) →

The 2022 FINA Women's Water Polo World League was the 18th edition of the annual women's international water polo tournament, running from 25 January to 6 November 2022.

Spain won their first title after a win over Hungary.

== European qualification round ==
The draw for the european qualification round was conducted in Lausanne, Switzerland on 17 November 2021.

=== First round ===
All six teams advanced to the second round of the European qualifications.

==== Group A ====
Pos	Team	Pld	W	OTW	OTL	L	GF	GA	GD	Pts	Qualification	Hungary	Netherlands	Greece
1	Hungary	2	1	0	1	0	25	24	+1	4	Second round	—	11–9	—
2	Netherlands	2	1	0	0	1	22	18	+4	3	Second round	—	—	13–7
3	Greece	2	0	1	0	1	22	27	−5	2	Second round	15–14^{Pen.}	—	—

Source: FINA

==== Group B ====
Pos	Team	Pld	W	OTW	OTL	L	GF	GA	GD	Pts	Qualification	Italy	Spain	Russia
1	Italy	2	1	0	0	1	16	21	−5	3	Second round	—	11–10	—
2	Spain	1	0	0	0	1	10	11	−1	0	Second round	—	—	15 Mar
3	Russia (Note: Russia was excluded due to the 2022 Russian invasion of Ukraine.)	1	1	0	0	0	11	5	+6	3	Excluded	11–5	—	—

Source: FINA

=== Second round ===
- 22–24 April 2022, Santa Cruz de Tenerife, Spain

The top-four European teams qualified for the Super Final. France replaced Russia.

Playoff
22 April 2022
Netherlands	18
France	6
22 April 2022
Spain	13
Greece	9

Semi-finals
23 April 2022
Italy	7
Netherlands	9
23 April 2022
Hungary	12 (6)
Spain (pen.)	12 (7)

Final
24 April 2022
Netherlands	12
Spain	11
Third place
24 April 2022
Italy	10
Hungary	9

Fifth place bracket

Fifth place game
24 April 2022
France	10
Greece	15

== Intercontinental Cup ==
- 7–13 March 2022, Lima, Peru

Pos	Team	Pld	W	OTW	OTL	L	GF	GA	GD	Pts	Qualification	Australia	Canada	United States	Brazil	Argentina	Cuba	Colombia
1	Australia	6	6	0	0	0	127	25	+102	18	Super final	—	—	11–4	—	28–3	—	33–1
2	Canada	6	5	0	0	1	97	39	+58	15	Super final	11–14	—	6–5	—	—	—	24–4
3	United States	6	4	0	0	2	86	30	+56	12	Super final	—	—	—	13–5	17–3	—	—
4	Brazil	6	3	0	0	3	54	65	−11	9	Super final	2–17	9–19	—	—	—	10–9	—
5	Argentina	6	2	0	0	4	35	89	−54	6		—	3–16	—	3–8	—	12–11	—
6	Cuba	6	1	0	0	5	45	99	−54	3		4–26	4–21	2–21	—	—	—	—
7	Colombia	6	0	0	0	6	30	127	−97	0		—	—	3–26	4–20	9–11	9–15	—

Source: FINA

== Super final ==
2022 FINA Women's Water Polo World League
Tournament details
- Host country: Spain
- Venue: 1 (in 1 host city)
- Dates: 2–6 November
- Teams: 8 (from 3 confederations)

Final positions
- Champions: Spain (1st title)
- Runners-up: Hungary
- Third place: United States
- Fourth place: Netherlands

Tournament statistics
- Matches played: 20
- Goals scored: 472 (23.6 per match)

Awards
- Best player: (Hungary) Rita Keszthelyi
- Best goalkeeper: (Spain) Martina Terré

=== Teams ===
As host country

- Spain

Qualified teams

- Australia
- ~~Brazil~~
- Canada
- Hungary
- Italy
- Netherlands
- United States

Invited teams

- New Zealand

=== Preliminary round ===
All times are local (UTC+1).

==== Group A ====
Pos	Team	Pld	W	OTW	OTL	L	GF	GA	GD	Pts	Qualification
1	United States	3	3	0	0	0	31	21	+10	9	Semifinals
2	Netherlands	3	1	0	1	1	35	37	−2	4	Semifinals
3	Italy	3	1	0	0	2	43	38	+5	3	
4	Canada	3	0	1	0	2	25	38	−13	2	

Source: FINA
Rules for classification: 1) points; 2) head-to-head points; 3) head-to-head goal difference; 4) head-to-head number of goals scored; 5) goal difference.

2 November 2022; 08:40	Report	Netherlands	6–9	United States	Real Club Nautico, Santa Cruz de Tenerife; Referees: Marta Cabañas (ESP), Stefan Seidl (GER)
2 November 2022; 08:40	Report	Score by quarters: 2–3, 0–2, 2–3, 2–1			Real Club Nautico, Santa Cruz de Tenerife; Referees: Marta Cabañas (ESP), Stefan Seidl (GER)
2 November 2022; 08:40	Report	Moolhuijzen 2	Goals	three players 2	Real Club Nautico, Santa Cruz de Tenerife; Referees: Marta Cabañas (ESP), Stefan Seidl (GER)

2 November 2022; 12:00	Report	Canada	9–16	Italy	Real Club Nautico, Santa Cruz de Tenerife; Referees: Nóra Debreceni (HUN), Julien Bourges (FRA)
2 November 2022; 12:00	Report	Score by quarters: 2–3, 3–4, 1–6, 3–3			Real Club Nautico, Santa Cruz de Tenerife; Referees: Nóra Debreceni (HUN), Julien Bourges (FRA)
2 November 2022; 12:00	Report	McKelvey, La Roche 2	Goals	Marletta 3	Real Club Nautico, Santa Cruz de Tenerife; Referees: Nóra Debreceni (HUN), Julien Bourges (FRA)

3 November 2022; 08:40	Report	Canada	5–11	United States	Real Club Nautico, Santa Cruz de Tenerife; Referees: Nicola Johnson (AUS), Natalia Markopoulou (GRE)
3 November 2022; 08:40	Report	Score by quarters: 1–3, 1–5, 2–2, 1–1			Real Club Nautico, Santa Cruz de Tenerife; Referees: Nicola Johnson (AUS), Natalia Markopoulou (GRE)
3 November 2022; 08:40	Report	five players 1	Goals	Roemer 4	Real Club Nautico, Santa Cruz de Tenerife; Referees: Nicola Johnson (AUS), Natalia Markopoulou (GRE)

3 November 2022; 10:20	Report	Netherlands	18–17	Italy	Real Club Nautico, Santa Cruz de Tenerife; Referees: Nóra Debreceni (HUN), Marta Cabañas (ESP)
3 November 2022; 10:20	Report	Score by quarters: 5–4, 5–4, 3–4, 5–5			Real Club Nautico, Santa Cruz de Tenerife; Referees: Nóra Debreceni (HUN), Marta Cabañas (ESP)
3 November 2022; 10:20	Report	Moolhuijzen 4	Goals	Marletta 6	Real Club Nautico, Santa Cruz de Tenerife; Referees: Nóra Debreceni (HUN), Marta Cabañas (ESP)

4 November 2022; 08:40	Report	Netherlands	14–15 (PSO)	Canada	Real Club Nautico, Santa Cruz de Tenerife; Referees: Danielle Dabbaghian (USA), Giuliana Nicolosi (ITA)
4 November 2022; 08:40	Report	Score by quarters: 3–3, 4–3, 2–4, 2–1 PSO: 3–4			Real Club Nautico, Santa Cruz de Tenerife; Referees: Danielle Dabbaghian (USA), Giuliana Nicolosi (ITA)
4 November 2022; 08:40	Report	Van de Kraats 4	Goals	McKelvey 4	Real Club Nautico, Santa Cruz de Tenerife; Referees: Danielle Dabbaghian (USA), Giuliana Nicolosi (ITA)

4 November 2022; 12:00	Report	United States	11–10	Italy	Real Club Nautico, Santa Cruz de Tenerife; Referees: Julien Bourges (FRA), Nicola Johnson (AUS)
4 November 2022; 12:00	Report	Score by quarters: 5–2, 2–4, 1–2, 3–2			Real Club Nautico, Santa Cruz de Tenerife; Referees: Julien Bourges (FRA), Nicola Johnson (AUS)
4 November 2022; 12:00	Report	five players 2	Goals	three players 2	Real Club Nautico, Santa Cruz de Tenerife; Referees: Julien Bourges (FRA), Nicola Johnson (AUS)

==== Group B ====
Pos	Team	Pld	W	OTW	OTL	L	GF	GA	GD	Pts	Qualification
1	Spain	3	3	0	0	0	48	20	+28	9	Semifinals
2	Hungary	3	2	0	0	1	45	31	+14	6	Semifinals
3	Australia	3	1	0	0	2	26	26	0	3	
4	New Zealand	3	0	0	0	3	18	60	−42	0	

Source: FINA
Rules for classification: 1) points; 2) head-to-head points; 3) head-to-head goal difference; 4) head-to-head number of goals scored; 5) goal difference.

2 November 2022; 10:20	Report	Australia	7–9	Hungary	Real Club Nautico, Santa Cruz de Tenerife; Referees: Natalia Markopoulou (GRE), William MacKay (CAN)
2 November 2022; 10:20	Report	Score by quarters: 1–2, 2–2, 2–1, 2–4			Real Club Nautico, Santa Cruz de Tenerife; Referees: Natalia Markopoulou (GRE), William MacKay (CAN)
2 November 2022; 10:20	Report	Halligan 3	Goals	Keszthelyi 3	Real Club Nautico, Santa Cruz de Tenerife; Referees: Natalia Markopoulou (GRE), William MacKay (CAN)

2 November 2022; 13:40	Report	Spain	21–4	New Zealand	Real Club Nautico, Santa Cruz de Tenerife; Referees: Giuliana Nicolosi (ITA), Danielle Dabbaghian (USA)
2 November 2022; 13:40	Report	Score by quarters: 4–1, 2–1, 7–1, 8–1			Real Club Nautico, Santa Cruz de Tenerife; Referees: Giuliana Nicolosi (ITA), Danielle Dabbaghian (USA)
2 November 2022; 13:40	Report	Ortiz 4	Goals	Milicich 2	Real Club Nautico, Santa Cruz de Tenerife; Referees: Giuliana Nicolosi (ITA), Danielle Dabbaghian (USA)

3 November 2022; 12:00	Report	Australia	14–5	New Zealand	Real Club Nautico, Santa Cruz de Tenerife; Referees: Peter de Jong (NED), Giuliana Nicolosi (ITA)
3 November 2022; 12:00	Report	Score by quarters: 4–1, 2–1, 4–2, 1–1			Real Club Nautico, Santa Cruz de Tenerife; Referees: Peter de Jong (NED), Giuliana Nicolosi (ITA)
3 November 2022; 12:00	Report	Halligan 6	Goals	Quin 2	Real Club Nautico, Santa Cruz de Tenerife; Referees: Peter de Jong (NED), Giuliana Nicolosi (ITA)

3 November 2022; 13:40	Report	Spain	15–11	Hungary	Real Club Nautico, Santa Cruz de Tenerife; Referees: Stefan Seidl (GER), Danielle Dabbaghian (USA)
3 November 2022; 13:40	Report	Score by quarters: 3–2, 6–2, 4–3, 2–4			Real Club Nautico, Santa Cruz de Tenerife; Referees: Stefan Seidl (GER), Danielle Dabbaghian (USA)
3 November 2022; 13:40	Report	Ortiz 4	Goals	Faragó 3	Real Club Nautico, Santa Cruz de Tenerife; Referees: Stefan Seidl (GER), Danielle Dabbaghian (USA)

4 November 2022; 10:20	Report	New Zealand	9–25	Hungary	Real Club Nautico, Santa Cruz de Tenerife; Referees: Marta Cabañas (ESP), Peter de Jong (NED)
4 November 2022; 10:20	Report	Score by quarters: 2–5, 5–8, 1–5, 1–7			Real Club Nautico, Santa Cruz de Tenerife; Referees: Marta Cabañas (ESP), Peter de Jong (NED)
4 November 2022; 10:20	Report	Houghton, Nicholson 3	Goals	Gurisatti 6	Real Club Nautico, Santa Cruz de Tenerife; Referees: Marta Cabañas (ESP), Peter de Jong (NED)

4 November 2022; 13:40	Report	Spain	12–5	Australia	Real Club Nautico, Santa Cruz de Tenerife; Referees: William MacKay (CAN), Stefan Seidl (GER)
4 November 2022; 13:40	Report	Score by quarters: 3–2, 4–3, 4–0, 1–0			Real Club Nautico, Santa Cruz de Tenerife; Referees: William MacKay (CAN), Stefan Seidl (GER)
4 November 2022; 13:40	Report	Espar 3	Goals	Ridge 3	Real Club Nautico, Santa Cruz de Tenerife; Referees: William MacKay (CAN), Stefan Seidl (GER)

=== Knockout stage ===
==== 5th–8th place bracket ====
5th–8th place semifinals
5 November
Italy	13
New Zealand	5
5 November
Australia	12
Canada	10

Fifth place game
6 November
Italy	13
Australia	11
Seventh place game
6 November
New Zealand	6
Canada	13

===== 5–8th place semifinals =====
5 November 2022; 08:40	Report	Italy	13–5	New Zealand	Real Club Nautico, Santa Cruz de Tenerife; Referees: Danielle Dabbaghian (USA), Marta Cabañas (ESP)
5 November 2022; 08:40	Report	Score by quarters: 2–1, 4–2, 3–0, 4–2			Real Club Nautico, Santa Cruz de Tenerife; Referees: Danielle Dabbaghian (USA), Marta Cabañas (ESP)
5 November 2022; 08:40	Report	three players 2	Goals	Houghton, Nicholson 2	Real Club Nautico, Santa Cruz de Tenerife; Referees: Danielle Dabbaghian (USA), Marta Cabañas (ESP)

5 November 2022; 10:20	Report	Australia	12–10	Canada	Real Club Nautico, Santa Cruz de Tenerife; Referees: Nóra Debreceni (HUN), Peter de Jong (NED)
5 November 2022; 10:20	Report	Score by quarters: 2–3, 3–3, 5–1, 2–3			Real Club Nautico, Santa Cruz de Tenerife; Referees: Nóra Debreceni (HUN), Peter de Jong (NED)
5 November 2022; 10:20	Report	Kearns 4	Goals	Christmas 4	Real Club Nautico, Santa Cruz de Tenerife; Referees: Nóra Debreceni (HUN), Peter de Jong (NED)

===== Seventh place game =====
6 November 2022; 08:40	Report	New Zealand	6–13	Canada	Real Club Nautico, Santa Cruz de Tenerife; Referees: Julien Bourges (FRA), Stefan Seidl (GER)
6 November 2022; 08:40	Report	Score by quarters: 4–4, 0–3, 1–3, 1–3			Real Club Nautico, Santa Cruz de Tenerife; Referees: Julien Bourges (FRA), Stefan Seidl (GER)
6 November 2022; 08:40	Report	Nicholson 3	Goals	Christmas 4	Real Club Nautico, Santa Cruz de Tenerife; Referees: Julien Bourges (FRA), Stefan Seidl (GER)

===== Fifth place game =====
6 November 2022; 10:20	Report	Italy	13–11	Australia	Real Club Nautico, Santa Cruz de Tenerife; Referees: Natalia Markopoulou (GRE), Nóra Debreceni (HUN)
6 November 2022; 10:20	Report	Score by quarters: 4–2, 5–3, 2–6, 2–0			Real Club Nautico, Santa Cruz de Tenerife; Referees: Natalia Markopoulou (GRE), Nóra Debreceni (HUN)
6 November 2022; 10:20	Report	Picozzi 3	Goals	Williams 3	Real Club Nautico, Santa Cruz de Tenerife; Referees: Natalia Markopoulou (GRE), Nóra Debreceni (HUN)

==== Championship bracket ====
Semi-finals
5 November
United States	9
Hungary	10
5 November
Spain	14
Netherlands	10

Final
6 November
Hungary	11 (7)
Spain (PSO)	11 (8)
Third place
6 November
United States (PSO)	11 (5)
Netherlands	11 (4)

===== Semifinals =====
5 November 2022; 12:00	Report	Spain	14–10	Netherlands	Real Club Nautico, Santa Cruz de Tenerife; Referees: Giuliana Nicolosi (ITA), Julien Bourges (FRA)
5 November 2022; 12:00	Report	Score by quarters: 2–2, 4–2, 3–3, 5–3			Real Club Nautico, Santa Cruz de Tenerife; Referees: Giuliana Nicolosi (ITA), Julien Bourges (FRA)
5 November 2022; 12:00	Report	Forca, Ortiz 3	Goals	Moolhuijzen, Sleeking 3	Real Club Nautico, Santa Cruz de Tenerife; Referees: Giuliana Nicolosi (ITA), Julien Bourges (FRA)

5 November 2022; 13:40	Report	United States	9–10	Hungary	Real Club Nautico, Santa Cruz de Tenerife; Referees: Natalia Markopoulou (GRE), William MacKay (CAN)
5 November 2022; 13:40	Report	Score by quarters: 3–3, 2–3, 2–1, 2–3			Real Club Nautico, Santa Cruz de Tenerife; Referees: Natalia Markopoulou (GRE), William MacKay (CAN)
5 November 2022; 13:40	Report	Roemer, Shabb 2	Goals	Szilágyi 3	Real Club Nautico, Santa Cruz de Tenerife; Referees: Natalia Markopoulou (GRE), William MacKay (CAN)

===== Third place game =====
6 November 2022; 12:00	Report	United States	16–15 (PSO)	Netherlands	Real Club Nautico, Santa Cruz de Tenerife; Referees: Giuliana Nicolosi (ITA), Marta Cabañas (ESP)
6 November 2022; 12:00	Report	Score by quarters: 3–3, 4–1, 2–3, 2–4 PSO: 5–4			Real Club Nautico, Santa Cruz de Tenerife; Referees: Giuliana Nicolosi (ITA), Marta Cabañas (ESP)
6 November 2022; 12:00	Report	Raney 4	Goals	five players 2	Real Club Nautico, Santa Cruz de Tenerife; Referees: Giuliana Nicolosi (ITA), Marta Cabañas (ESP)

===== Final =====
6 November 2022; 13:40	Report	Hungary	18–19 (PSO)	Spain	Real Club Nautico, Santa Cruz de Tenerife; Referees: Nicola Johnson (AUS), Danielle Dabbaghian (USA)
6 November 2022; 13:40	Report	Score by quarters: 3–3, 3–3, 3–3, 2–2 PSO: 7–8			Real Club Nautico, Santa Cruz de Tenerife; Referees: Nicola Johnson (AUS), Danielle Dabbaghian (USA)
6 November 2022; 13:40	Report	Keszthelyi, Pőcze 3	Goals	González 3	Real Club Nautico, Santa Cruz de Tenerife; Referees: Nicola Johnson (AUS), Danielle Dabbaghian (USA)

=== Final ranking ===
Rank	Team
1	Spain
2	Hungary
3	United States
4	Netherlands
5	Italy
6	Australia
7	Canada
8	New Zealand
