= Elena Sánchez (water polo) =

Spanish water polo player (born 1994)

Personal information
- Full name: María Elena Sánchez González
- Nationality: Spanish
- Born: 22 October 1994 (age 31) Terrassa, Barcelona
- Height: 1.78 m (5 ft 10 in)
- Weight: 64 kg (141 lb)

Sport
- Sport: Water polo
- Position: Goalkeeper
- Number: 13
National team
- Years: Team
- 2014–: Spain
Medal record
Olympic Games
Silver medal – second place	2020 Tokyo	Team
World Championships
Silver medal – second place	2019 Gwangju	Team
European Championships
Gold medal – first place	2020 Budapest
Bronze medal – third place	2018 Barcelona
World Cup
Bronze medal – third place	2014 Khanty-Mansiysk
World League
Silver medal – second place	2016 Shanghai
Europa Cup
Bronze medal – third place	2018 Pontevedra
Mediterranean Games
Gold medal – first place	2018 Tarragona	Team

María Elena Sánchez González (born 22 October 1994) is a Spanish water polo goalkeeper who won the silver medal with the women's national water polo team at the 2020 Summer Olympics celebrated in Tokyo, Japan.

== International career ==
In 2018 she won the gold medal at the Mediterranean Games in Tarragona and the bronze at the European Water Polo Championship in Barcelona.

== See also ==
- List of Olympic medalists in water polo
- List of World Aquatics Championships medalists in water polo
