= Spain women's national water polo team =

Women's national water polo team representing Spain

Spain
- FINA code: ESP
- Association: Royal Spanish Swimming Federation
- Confederation: LEN (Europe)
- Head coach: Jordi Valls
- Asst coach: Antonio Aparicio; Mario García
- Captain: Anni Espar

Olympic Games (team statistics)
- Appearances: 4 (first in 2012)
- Best result: (gold) (2024)

World Championship
- Appearances: 14 (first in 1998)
- Best result: (gold) (2013)

World Cup
- Appearances: 5 (first in 2014)
- Best result: (silver) (2026)

World League
- Appearances: 16 (first in 2005)
- Best result: (gold) (2022)

European Championship
- Appearances: 17 (first in 1993)
- Best result: (gold) (2014, 2020, 2022)

Media
- Website: rfen.es

The Spain women's national water polo team (Spanish: Selección Española Femenina de Waterpolo) represents Spain in women's international water polo competitions and it is controlled by Real Federación Española de Natación.

Spain got the «Triple Crown», they are Olympic (2024), World (2013) and European (2014, 2020, 2022) champions. They also have won medals in the main international competitions: three Olympic, six World Championship, six European Championships, two World Cup and two World League medals, making them one of the most successful women's water polo teams in the world, currently ranked 1st.

== Results ==
=== Olympic Games ===
Year	Position
(Australia) 2000	DNQ
(Greece) 2004	DNQ
(China) 2008	DNQ
(United Kingdom) 2012	2nd place, silver medalist(s)
(Brazil) 2016	5th
(Japan) 2020	2nd place, silver medalist(s)
(France) 2024	1st place, gold medalist(s)
Total	4/7

=== World Championship ===
Year	Position
(Australia) 1998	9th
(Japan) 2001	DNQ
(Spain) 2003	8th
(Canada) 2005	11th
(Australia) 2007	7th
(Italy) 2009	8th
(China) 2011	11th
(Spain) 2013	1st place, gold medalist(s)
(Russia) 2015	7th
(Hungary) 2017	2nd place, silver medalist(s)
(South Korea) 2019	2nd place, silver medalist(s)
(Hungary) 2022	5th
(Japan) 2023	2nd place, silver medalist(s)
(Qatar) 2024	3rd place, bronze medalist(s)
(Singapore) 2025	3rd place, bronze medalist(s)
Total	14/19

=== European Championship ===
Year	Position
(United Kingdom) 1993	9th
(Austria) 1995	9th
(Spain) 1997	4th
(Italy) 1999	6th
(Hungary) 2001	6th
(Slovenia) 2003	6th
(Serbia) 2006	4th
(Spain) 2008	2nd place, silver medalist(s)
(Croatia) 2010	6th
(Netherlands) 2012	5th
(Hungary) 2014	1st place, gold medalist(s)
(Serbia) 2016	4th
(Spain) 2018	3rd place, bronze medalist(s)
(Hungary) 2020	1st place, gold medalist(s)
(Croatia) 2022	1st place, gold medalist(s)
(Netherlands) 2024	2nd place, silver medalist(s)
(Portugal) 2026	5th
Total	17/17

=== World Cup ===
- 2014 – (bronze) Bronze medal
- 2018 – 4th place
- 2023 – (bronze) Bronze medal
- 2025 – 4th place
- 2026 – (silver) Silver medal

=== World League ===
- 2012 – Preliminary round
- 2013 – 5th place
- 2014 – 5th place
- 2015 – Preliminary round
- 2016 – (silver) Silver medal
- 2018 – 5th place
- 2019 – Preliminary round
- 2020 – 5th place
- 2022 – (gold) Gold medal

== Team ==
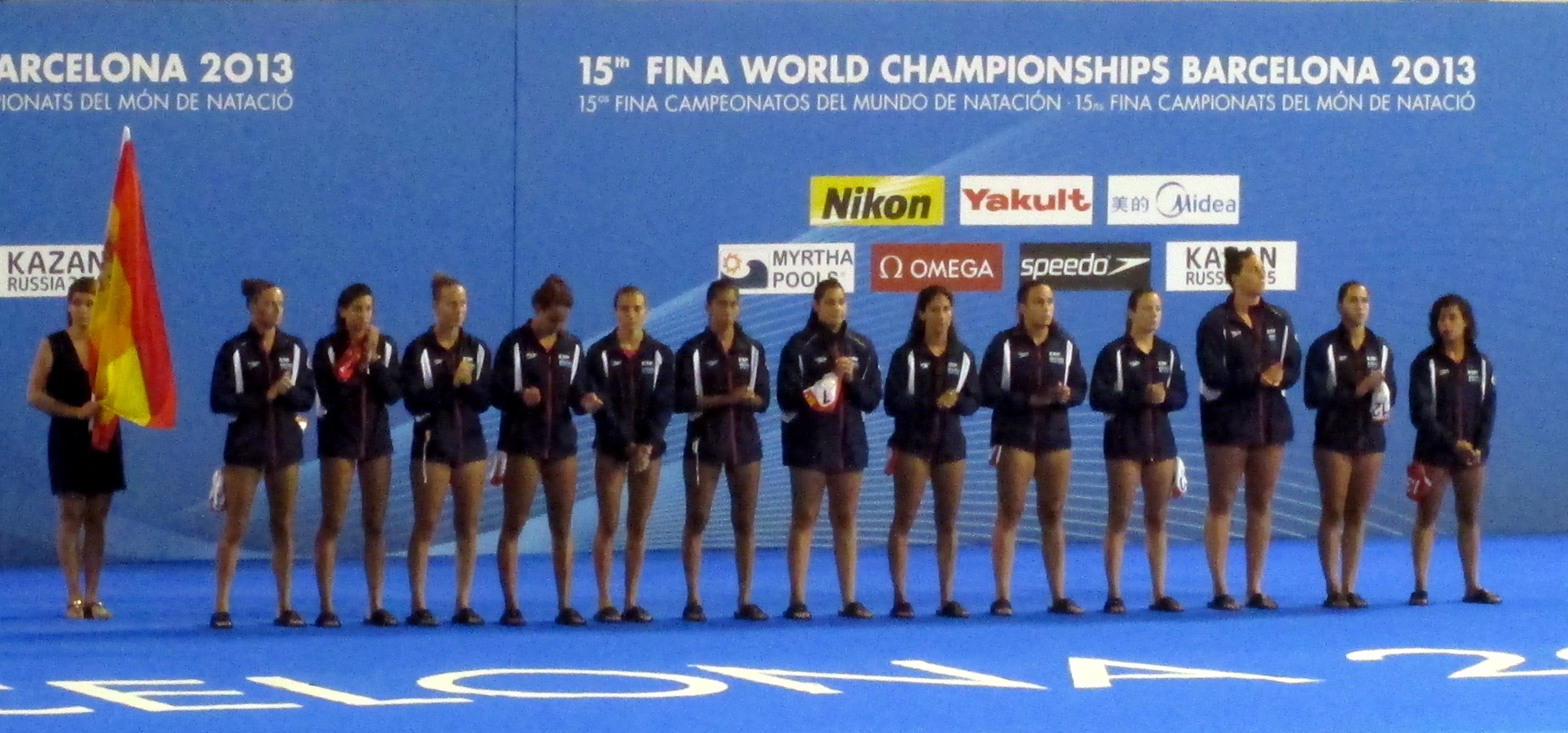
Line-up of the Spain national team at the 2013 World Aquatics Championships in Barcelona.

=== Current squad ===
Roster for the 2025 World Championships.

Head coach: Jordi Valls

- 1 Mariona Terre Marti GK
- 2 Ariadna Ruiz FP
- 3 Anni Espar FP
- 4 Beatriz Ortiz FP
- 5 Nona Pérez FP
- 6 Paula Crespí FP
- 7 Elena Ruiz FP
- 8 Paula Prats Rodriguez FP
- 9 Daniela Moreno Perez FP
- 10 Paula Camus FP
- 11 Irene González FP
- 12 Paula Leitón FP
- 13 Martina Terré GK
- 14 Carlota Peñalver Granero FP

=== Former squads ===
==== Olympic Games ====
2012 – (silver) Silver Medal	2016 – 5th place	2020 – (silver) Silver Medal
Laura Ester (GK), Marta Bach, Anni Espar, Roser Tarragó, Mati Ortiz, Jennifer Pareja (C), Lorena Miranda, Pili Peña, Andrea Blas, Ona Meseguer, Maica García, Laura López, Ana Copado (GK). Head Coach: Miki Oca.	Laura Ester (GK), Marta Bach, Anni Espar, Bea Ortiz, Mati Ortiz, Paula Leitón, Clara Espar, Pili Peña (C), Judith Forca, Roser Tarragó, Maica García, Laura López, Patri Herrera (GK). Head Coach: Miki Oca.	Laura Ester (GK), Marta Bach, Anni Espar, Bea Ortiz, Elena Ruiz, Irene González, Clara Espar, Pili Peña (C), Judith Forca, Roser Tarragó, Maica García, Paula Leitón, Elena Sánchez (GK). Head Coach: Miki Oca.
2024 – (gold) Gold Medal
Laura Ester (GK), Isabel Piralkova, Anni Espar, Beatriz Ortiz, Nona Pérez, Paula Crespí, Elena Ruiz, Pili Peña (C), Judith Forca, Paula Camus, Maica García, Paula Leitón, Martina Terré (GK). Head Coach: Miki Oca.

==== World Championships ====
2007 – 7th place	2009 – 8th place	2011 – 11th place
Patricia del Soto (GK) (C), Blanca Gil, Cristina Pardo, Irene Hagen, Miriam López-Escribano, Jennifer Pareja, Cristina López, Anna Pardo, Pili Peña, Ona Meseguer, Maica García, Laura López, Eli Gazulla (GK). Head Coach: Mar Sanromà.	Patricia del Soto (GK), Blanca Gil, Olga Doménech, Irene Hagen, Miriam López-Escribano (C), Jennifer Pareja, Cristina López, Pili Peña, Clara Aller, Ona Meseguer, Maica García, Laura López, Laura Ester (GK). Head Coach: Joan Jané.	Ana Copado (GK), Blanca Gil (C), Anni Espar, Helena Lloret, Mati Ortiz, Paula Chillida, Lorena Miranda, Pili Peña, Andrea Blas, Ona Meseguer, Maica García, Marta Bach, Laura Ester (GK). Head Coach: Miki Oca.
2013 – (gold) Gold Medal	2015 – 7th place	2017 – (silver) Silver Medal
Laura Ester (GK), Marta Bach, Anni Espar, Roser Tarragó, Mati Ortiz, Jennifer Pareja (C), Lorena Miranda, Pili Peña, Andrea Blas, Ona Meseguer, Maica García, Laura López, Patri Herrera (GK). Head Coach: Miki Oca.	Laura Ester (GK), Marta Bach, Anni Espar, Paula Leitón, Mati Ortiz, Jennifer Pareja (C), Clara Espar, Pili Peña, Judith Forca, Roser Tarragó, Maica García, Laura López, Patri Herrera (GK). Head Coach: Miki Oca.	Laura Ester (GK), Marta Bach, Anni Espar, Bea Ortiz, Mati Ortiz, Helena Lloret, Clara Espar, Pili Peña (C), Judith Forca, Paula Crespí, Anna Gual, Paula Leitón, Sandra Domene (GK). Head Coach: Miki Oca.
2019 – (silver) Silver Medal	2022 – 5th place	2023 – (silver) Silver Medal
Laura Ester (GK), Marta Bach, Anni Espar, Bea Ortiz, Roser Tarragó, Irene González, Clara Espar, Pili Peña (C), Judith Forca, Paula Crespí, Maica García, Paula Leitón, Elena Sánchez (GK). Head Coach: Miki Oca.

==== European Championships ====
2008 – (silver) Silver Medal	2010 – 6th place	2012 – 5th place
Patricia del Soto (GK), Blanca Gil, Cristina Pardo, Irene Hagen, Miriam López-Escribano (C), Jennifer Pareja, Cristina López, Anna Pardo, Pili Peña, Ona Meseguer, Maica García, Laura López, Laura Ester (GK). Head Coach: Vicenç Tarrés.	Laura Ester (GK), Blanca Gil (C), Anni Espar, Roser Tarragó, Mati Ortiz, Helena Lloret, Lorena Miranda, Pili Peña, Andrea Blas, Ona Meseguer, Maica García, Teresa Gorría, Paula Bugallo (GK). Head Coach: Miki Oca.	Laura Ester (GK), Paula Chillida, Anni Espar, Roser Tarragó, Mati Ortiz, Jennifer Pareja (C), Lorena Miranda, Pili Peña, Andrea Blas, Ona Meseguer, Maica García, Laura López, Patri Herrera (GK). Head Coach: Miki Oca.
2014 – (gold) Gold Medal	2016 – 4th place	2018 – (bronze) Bronze Medal
Laura Ester (GK), Marta Bach, Anni Espar, Roser Tarragó, Mati Ortiz, Jennifer Pareja (C), Lorena Miranda, Pili Peña, Andrea Blas, Ona Meseguer, Maica García, Laura López, Patri Herrera (GK). Head Coach: Miki Oca.	Laura Ester (GK), Marta Bach, Anni Espar, Paula Leitón, Mati Ortiz, Jennifer Pareja (C), Clara Espar, Pili Peña, Judith Forca, Roser Tarragó, Maica García, Laura López, Patri Herrera (GK). Head Coach: Miki Oca.	Laura Ester (GK), Marta Bach, Anni Espar, Bea Ortiz, Mati Ortiz, Helena Lloret, Clara Espar, Pili Peña (C), Judith Forca, Anna Gual, Maica García, Paula Leitón, Elena Sánchez (GK). Head Coach: Miki Oca.
2020 – (gold) Gold Medal	2022 – (gold) Gold Medal	2024 – (silver) Silver Medal
Laura Ester (GK), Marta Bach, Anni Espar, Bea Ortiz, Roser Tarragó, Irene González, Clara Espar, Pili Peña (C), Judith Forca, Paula Crespí, Maica García, Paula Leitón, Elena Sánchez (GK). Head Coach: Miki Oca.

== Youth teams ==
=== U-20 ===
- World Aquatics U20 Championships

- Winner (2): 2011, 2021
- Runner-up (3): 2013, 2015, 2023
- Third place (1): 2003

=== U-18 ===
- World Aquatics U18 Championships

- Winner (2): 2018, 2024
- Runner-up (1): 2016

=== U-16 ===
- World Aquatics U16 Championships

- Winner (1): 2024
- Third place (1): 2022

=== U-19 ===
- European Aquatics U19 Championships

- Winner (3): 2018, 2022, 2024
- Runner-up (2): 2010, 2016
- Third place (2): 2002, 2014

=== U-18 ===
- European Aquatics U17/18 Championships

- Winner (2): 2017, 2019
- Runner-up (4): 2010, 2013, 2015, 2023
- Third place (2): 2007, 2011

=== U-16 ===
- European Aquatics U15/16 Championships

- Winner (3): 2019, 2023, 2025
- Third place (1): 2021

== See also ==
- Spain men's national water polo team
- List of world champions in women's water polo
- Spain women's Olympic water polo team records and statistics
