= Clara Espar =

Spanish water polo player (born 1994)

Personal information
- Full name: Clara Espar Llaquet
- Born: 29 September 1994 (age 31) Barcelona, Spain
- Height: 5 ft 8 in (173 cm)
- Weight: 154 lb (70 kg)

Sport
- Country: Spain
- Sport: Water polo
- College team: San Jose State Spartans
- Club: CE Mediterrani
Medal record
Olympic Games
Silver medal – second place	2020 Tokyo	Team
World Championships
Silver medal – second place	2017 Budapest	Team
Silver medal – second place	2019 Gwangju	Team
European Championships
Gold medal – first place	2020 Budapest
Bronze medal – third place	2018 Barcelona
FINA World Cup
Bronze medal – third place	2014 Khanty-Mansiysk
FINA World League
Silver medal – second place	2016 Shanghai
Europa Cup
Bronze medal – third place	2018 Pontevedra
Mediterranean Games
Gold medal – first place	2018 Tarragona	Team

Clara Espar Llaquet (born 29 September 1994) is a Spanish water polo player who won the silver medal at the 2017 World Championships in Budapest and at the 2019 World Championships in Gwangju.

== College career ==
Espar attended San Jose State University, playing on the women's water polo team from 2014 to 2015. She scored 96 goals as a freshman and 94 as a sophomore being the first player in San Jose State history to score at least one goal in every single match in a season.

== International career ==
In 2018 she won the gold medal at Mediterranean Games in Tarragona and the bronze at European Championship in Barcelona.

== Family ==
Espar's older sister, Anni, is also a professional water polo player.

== See also ==
- List of World Aquatics Championships medalists in water polo
