= Ana Copado =

Spanish water polo player (born 1980)

Personal information
- Full name: Ana Maria Copado Amoros
- Born: 31 March 1980 (age 46) Terrassa, Spain
Medal record
Women's water polo
Representing Spain
Olympic Games
Silver medal – second place	2012 London	Team

Ana Maria Copado Amoros (born 31 March 1980 in Terrassa) is a Spanish water polo goalkeeper. At the 2012 Summer Olympics, she competed for the Spain women's national water polo team in the women's event, where they won the silver medal. She is 5 ft 11 inches tall.

== See also ==
- Spain women's Olympic water polo team records and statistics
- List of Olympic medalists in water polo (women)
- List of women's Olympic water polo tournament goalkeepers
