= Roser Tarragó =

Spanish water polo player (born 1993)

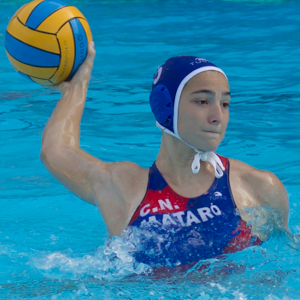
- Tarragó in 2012

Personal information
- Born: Roser Tarragó Aymerich; 25 March 1993 (age 33) Barcelona, Spain
- Height: 5 ft 7 in (170 cm)
- Weight: 130 lb (59 kg)

Sport
- Country: Spain
- Sport: Water polo
- College team: Cal Bears
- Club: CE Mediterrani
Medal record
Women's water polo
Representing Spain
Olympic Games
| Silver medal – second place | 2012 London | Team |
| Silver medal – second place | 2020 Tokyo | Team |
World Championships
| Gold medal – first place | 2013 Barcelona | Team |
| Silver medal – second place | 2019 Gwangju | Team |
European Championships
| Gold medal – first place | 2014 Budapest |
| Gold medal – first place | 2020 Budapest |
World Cup
| Bronze medal – third place | 2014 Khanty-Mansiysk |
World League
| Silver medal – second place | 2016 Shanghai |

Roser Tarragó Aymerich (born 25 March 1993) is a Spanish water polo player. At the 2012 Summer Olympics, she competed for the Spain women's national water polo team in the women's event, where they won the silver medal.

== Club career ==
She started her career in 2006 at CN Mataró. In 2018, she transferred to CE Mediterrani.

== College career ==
Tarragó attended University of California, Berkeley, playing on the women's water polo team from 2014 to 2018.

== See also ==
- Spain women's Olympic water polo team records and statistics
- List of Olympic medalists in water polo (women)
- List of women's Olympic water polo tournament top goalscorers
- List of world champions in women's water polo
- List of World Aquatics Championships medalists in water polo
