= Irene González (water polo) =

Spanish water polo player (born 1996)

Personal information
- Born: Irene González López; 23 July 1996 (age 30) Barcelona, Spain
- Height: 5 ft 8 in (173 cm)
- Weight: 145 lb (66 kg)

Sport
- Country: Spain
- Sport: Water polo
- College team: Hawai'i Rainbow Wahine
- Club: CN Sabadell
Medal record
Olympic Games
Silver medal – second place	2020 Tokyo	Team
World Championships
Silver medal – second place	2019 Gwangju	Team
Bronze medal – third place	2025 Singapore	Team
World Cup
Silver medal – second place	2026 Sydney
European Championships
Gold medal – first place	2020 Budapest
Gold medal – first place	2022 Split

Irene González López (born 23 July 1996) is a Spanish water polo player who won the silver medal with the women's national water polo team at the 2020 Summer Olympics in Tokyo, Japan.

== Early career ==
González graduate of IES CAR Sant Cugat, Barcelona, in 2014. She helped her national team to win the silver medal at 2013 and 2015 FINA Junior World Championships.

== College career ==
González attended University of Hawaii at Manoa, playing on the women's water polo team from 2016 to 2019. As a freshman, she led the team with 73 goals, scoring in 24 matches with 18 multiple-goal games. She was named 2016 Big West Freshman of the Year.

She led the team to the Big West Conference championship in 2019 and to second place in 2018. She was named 2018 and 2019 Big West Player of the Year, being first player in University of Hawaii history to earn Big West Player of the Year multiple times and First-Team All-Big West for the fourth-straight season.

González was also named 2018 and 2019 All-America First Team by the Association of Collegiate Water Polo Coaches (ACWPC).

González graduated from Hawaii University in May 2019 with a B.S. degree in Kinesiology & Rehab Science.

== Club career ==
After playing several years for CN Sant Feliú and CN Rubí, in May 2019, González signed contract with Spanish professional club CN Mataró. In September 2020 she joined CN Sabadell.

== International career ==
González made her senior debut in 2016 winning the silver medal at the 2016 FINA World League - Super Final. In 2019 she won the silver medal at the World Championships celebrated in Gwangju, South Korea.

== See also ==
- List of Olympic medalists in water polo
- List of World Aquatics Championships medalists in water polo
