= Miki Oca =

Spanish water polo player (born 1970)

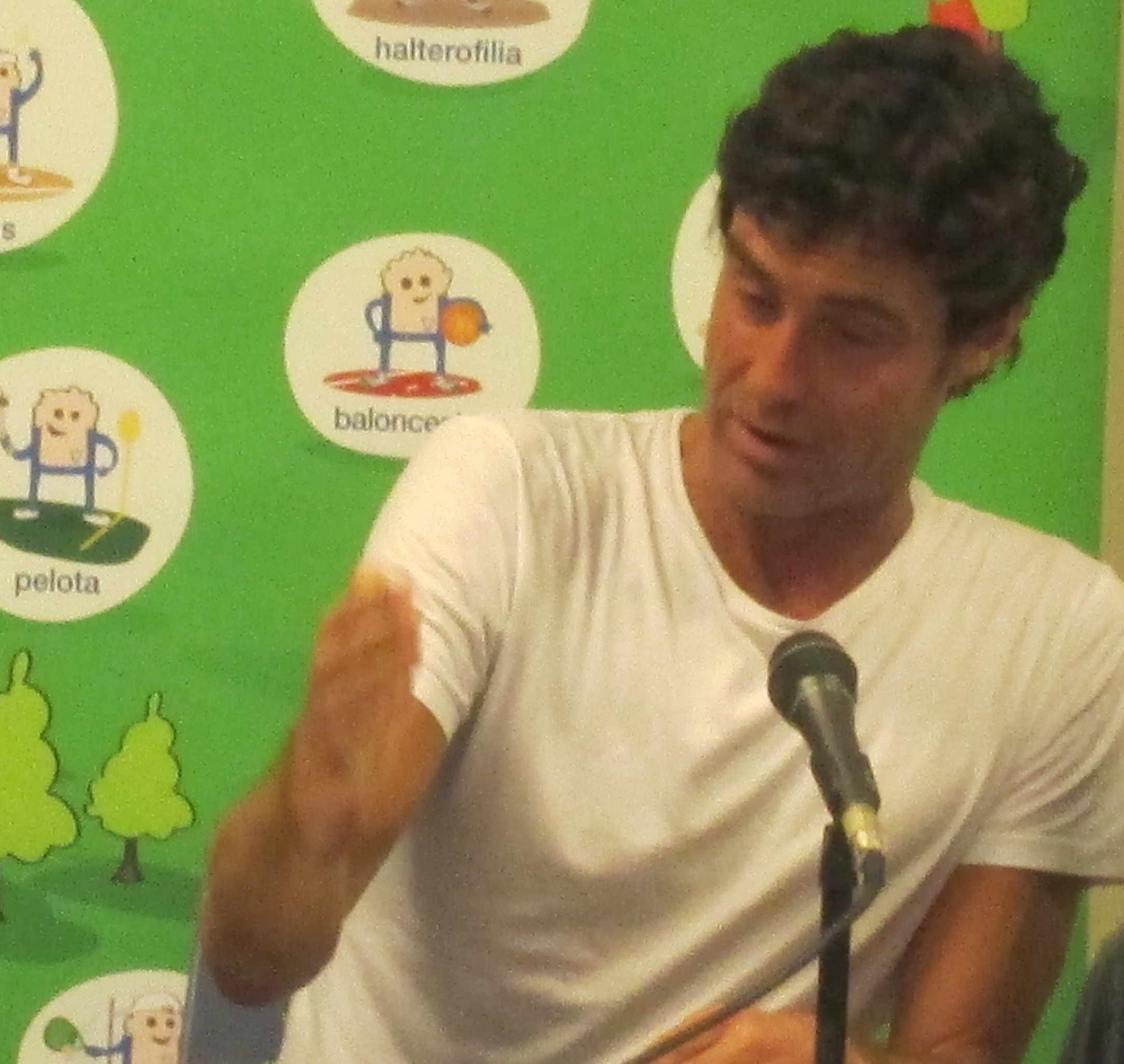

Personal information
- Nationality: Spanish
- Born: April 15, 1970 (age 56) Madrid, Spain
- Height: 1.87 m (6 ft 2 in)
- Weight: 82 kg (181 lb)

Sport
- Sport: Water polo
Medal record
Representing Spain
Olympic Games
Gold medal – first place	1996 Atlanta	Team competition
Silver medal – second place	1992 Barcelona	Team competition
World Championships
Silver medal – second place	1991 Perth	Team competition
Silver medal – second place	1994 Rome	Team competition
European Championships
Gold medal – first place	2014 Budapest	Team competition

Miguel Ángel Oca Gaia, better known as Miki Oca (born 15 April 1970), is a former Spanish water polo player, who was a member of the national team that won the gold medal at the 1996 Summer Olympics in Atlanta, Georgia. Four years earlier he won the silver medal. He is the current coach of the China women's national water polo team. He led the Spain women's national water polo team team to win the Olympic gold medal in 2024, and silver medal in 2012 and 2021 becoming one of a few sportspeople who won Olympic medals in water polo as players and head coaches.

== See also ==
- Spain men's Olympic water polo team records and statistics
- Spain women's Olympic water polo team records and statistics
- List of Olympic champions in men's water polo
- List of Olympic medalists in water polo (men)
- List of world champions in women's water polo
- List of World Aquatics Championships medalists in water polo
