= 2014 Women's European Water Polo Championship =

Tournament details
- Host country: Hungary
- Venue(s): 1 (in 1 host city)
- Dates: 16–26 July
- Teams: 8 (from 1 confederation)

Final positions
- Champions: Spain (1st title)
- Runner-up: Netherlands
- Third place: Hungary
- Fourth place: Italy

Tournament statistics
- Matches played: 20
- Goals scored: 374 (18.7 per match)
- Top scorer(s): (Hungary) Rita Keszthelyi (19 goals)

Awards
- Best player: (Spain) Maica García

The 2014 Women's European Water Polo Championship was held from 16 to 26 July 2014 in Budapest, Hungary.

Spain won their first title by defeating the Netherlands 10-5 in the final. Hungary captured the bronze medal after a 10–9 win over Italy.

== Qualification ==
There were eight teams in the 2014 championships. They qualified as follows:

- The host nation
- The best three teams from the 2012 European Championships not already qualified as the host nation
- Four qualifiers

Event	Date	Location	Vacancies	Qualified
Host nation	–	–	1	Hungary
2012 European Championships	16–29 January 2012	(Netherlands) Eindhoven	3	Italy; Greece; Russia
2014 Women's European Water Polo Championship Qualifiers	16–19 January 2014	–	4	France; Great Britain; Netherlands; Spain

== Championships ==
The structure of the championships is that there were two groups of four teams followed by a knockout phase. The first teams in each group automatically qualified to compete for the semis, and the second & third teams played a crossed match to qualify for the semis too. The last teams in each group played a classification playoff for 7th–8th place.

== Draw ==
The draw was held on 9 March 2014.

=== Groups ===
Group A	Group B
Greece; Hungary; Netherlands; Great Britain	Italy; Russia; Spain; France

== Preliminary round ==
The schedule was announced on 10 May 2014.

Team advances to Semifinals
Team advances to Quarterfinals
Team competes in placement matches

=== Group A ===
All times are CEST (UTC+2).

Team	G	W	D	L	GF	GA	Diff	Points
Netherlands	3	3	0	0	32	23	+9	9
Hungary	3	2	0	1	39	24	+15	6
Greece	3	1	0	2	23	28	−5	3
Great Britain	3	0	0	3	17	36	−19	0

16 July 2014; 13:00	Report	Great Britain	7–9	Greece	Alfréd Hajós National Swimming Stadium, Budapest; Referees: Grandin (FRA), Teixido (ESP)
16 July 2014; 13:00	Report	Score by quarters: 1–2, 3–2, 2–2, 1–3			Alfréd Hajós National Swimming Stadium, Budapest; Referees: Grandin (FRA), Teixido (ESP)
16 July 2014; 13:00	Report	Gibson-Byrne 3	Goals	Tsoukala 3	Alfréd Hajós National Swimming Stadium, Budapest; Referees: Grandin (FRA), Teixido (ESP)

16 July 2014; 17:30	Report	Netherlands	12–11	Hungary	Alfréd Hajós National Swimming Stadium, Budapest; Referees: Ćirić (SRB), Margeta (SLO)
16 July 2014; 17:30	Report	Score by quarters: 3–3, 3–3, 4–3, 2–2			Alfréd Hajós National Swimming Stadium, Budapest; Referees: Ćirić (SRB), Margeta (SLO)
16 July 2014; 17:30	Report	Genee, Van der Sloot 3	Goals	Keszthelyi 3	Alfréd Hajós National Swimming Stadium, Budapest; Referees: Ćirić (SRB), Margeta (SLO)

18 July 2014; 14:30	Report	Great Britain	5–11	Netherlands	Alfréd Hajós National Swimming Stadium, Budapest; Referees: Dreval (RUS), Taccini (ITA)
18 July 2014; 14:30	Report	Score by quarters: 1–2, 2–2, 1–3, 1–4			Alfréd Hajós National Swimming Stadium, Budapest; Referees: Dreval (RUS), Taccini (ITA)
18 July 2014; 14:30	Report	Gibson-Byrne 2	Goals	Genee 3	Alfréd Hajós National Swimming Stadium, Budapest; Referees: Dreval (RUS), Taccini (ITA)

18 July 2014; 17:30	Report	Hungary	12–7	Greece	Alfréd Hajós National Swimming Stadium, Budapest; Referees: Teixido (ESP), Franulović (CRO)
18 July 2014; 17:30	Report	Score by quarters: 3–0, 3–3, 3–2, 3–2			Alfréd Hajós National Swimming Stadium, Budapest; Referees: Teixido (ESP), Franulović (CRO)
18 July 2014; 17:30	Report	Antal 3	Goals	Tsoukala, Plevritou 3	Alfréd Hajós National Swimming Stadium, Budapest; Referees: Teixido (ESP), Franulović (CRO)

20 July 2014; 14:30	Report	Netherlands	9–7	Greece	Alfréd Hajós National Swimming Stadium, Budapest; Referees: Taccini (ITA), Galindo (ESP)
20 July 2014; 14:30	Report	Score by quarters: 3–1, 3–2, 2–3, 1–1			Alfréd Hajós National Swimming Stadium, Budapest; Referees: Taccini (ITA), Galindo (ESP)
20 July 2014; 14:30	Report	Klaassen 5	Goals	Roumpesi 3	Alfréd Hajós National Swimming Stadium, Budapest; Referees: Taccini (ITA), Galindo (ESP)

20 July 2014; 17:30	Report	Great Britain	5–16	Hungary	Alfréd Hajós National Swimming Stadium, Budapest; Referees: Grandin (FRA), Kikalishvili (GEO)
20 July 2014; 17:30	Report	Score by quarters: 2–5, 1–3, 1–5, 1–3			Alfréd Hajós National Swimming Stadium, Budapest; Referees: Grandin (FRA), Kikalishvili (GEO)
20 July 2014; 17:30	Report	Temple-Craik 2	Goals	Keszthelyi 6	Alfréd Hajós National Swimming Stadium, Budapest; Referees: Grandin (FRA), Kikalishvili (GEO)

=== Group B ===
All times are CEST (UTC+2).

Team	G	W	D	L	GF	GA	Diff	Points
Spain	3	2	0	1	39	22	+17	6
Italy	3	2	0	1	35	26	+9	6
Russia	3	2	0	1	38	28	+10	6
France	3	0	0	3	14	50	−36	0

16 July 2014; 14:30	Report	Italy	14–4	France	Alfréd Hajós National Swimming Stadium, Budapest; Referees: Dutilh-Dumas (NED), Alexandrescu (ROU)
16 July 2014; 14:30	Report	Score by quarters: 3–1, 4–1, 1–0, 6–2			Alfréd Hajós National Swimming Stadium, Budapest; Referees: Dutilh-Dumas (NED), Alexandrescu (ROU)
16 July 2014; 14:30	Report	three players 3	Goals	Clomes 2	Alfréd Hajós National Swimming Stadium, Budapest; Referees: Dutilh-Dumas (NED), Alexandrescu (ROU)

16 July 2014; 16:00	Report	Russia	10–9	Spain	Alfréd Hajós National Swimming Stadium, Budapest; Referees: Stavropoulos (GRE), Varkonyi (HUN)
16 July 2014; 16:00	Report	Score by quarters: 2–2, 2–3, 3–2, 3–2			Alfréd Hajós National Swimming Stadium, Budapest; Referees: Stavropoulos (GRE), Varkonyi (HUN)
16 July 2014; 16:00	Report	Ivanova 4	Goals	Tarragó, García 3	Alfréd Hajós National Swimming Stadium, Budapest; Referees: Stavropoulos (GRE), Varkonyi (HUN)

18 July 2014; 13:00	Report	France	4–18	Spain	Alfréd Hajós National Swimming Stadium, Budapest; Referees: Kikashvili (GEO), Schwartz (ISR)
18 July 2014; 13:00	Report	Score by quarters: 1–4, 0–6, 1–5, 2–3			Alfréd Hajós National Swimming Stadium, Budapest; Referees: Kikashvili (GEO), Schwartz (ISR)
18 July 2014; 13:00	Report	Daule 2	Goals	Tarragó 6	Alfréd Hajós National Swimming Stadium, Budapest; Referees: Kikashvili (GEO), Schwartz (ISR)

18 July 2014; 16:00	Report	Russia	10–13	Italy	Alfréd Hajós National Swimming Stadium, Budapest; Referees: Stavropoulos (GRE), Koganov (AZE)
18 July 2014; 16:00	Report	Score by quarters: 2–3, 1–3, 4–5, 3–2			Alfréd Hajós National Swimming Stadium, Budapest; Referees: Stavropoulos (GRE), Koganov (AZE)
18 July 2014; 16:00	Report	four players 2	Goals	Bianconi 4	Alfréd Hajós National Swimming Stadium, Budapest; Referees: Stavropoulos (GRE), Koganov (AZE)

20 July 2014; 13:00	Report	Russia	18–6	France	Alfréd Hajós National Swimming Stadium, Budapest; Referees: Toygaru (TUR), Dutilh-Dumas (NED)
20 July 2014; 13:00	Report	Score by quarters: 4–1, 6–3, 3–2, 5–0			Alfréd Hajós National Swimming Stadium, Budapest; Referees: Toygaru (TUR), Dutilh-Dumas (NED)
20 July 2014; 13:00	Report	Prokofyeva, Karimova 5	Goals	Guillet, Clomes 2	Alfréd Hajós National Swimming Stadium, Budapest; Referees: Toygaru (TUR), Dutilh-Dumas (NED)

20 July 2014; 16:00	Report	Italy	8–12	Spain	Alfréd Hajós National Swimming Stadium, Budapest; Referees: Varkonyi (HUN), Ćirić (SRB)
20 July 2014; 16:00	Report	Score by quarters: 1–4, 2–4, 3–3, 2–1			Alfréd Hajós National Swimming Stadium, Budapest; Referees: Varkonyi (HUN), Ćirić (SRB)
20 July 2014; 16:00	Report	Emmolo 4	Goals	Tarragó 5	Alfréd Hajós National Swimming Stadium, Budapest; Referees: Varkonyi (HUN), Ćirić (SRB)

== Final round ==
=== Bracket ===
Quarterfinals
A3	Greece	9
B2	Italy	11
A2	Hungary	11
B3	Russia	7

Semifinals
A1	Netherlands	12
B2	Italy	11
B1	Spain	9
A2	Hungary	8
5th place match
A3	Greece	5
B3	Russia	7

Gold medal match
A1	Netherlands	5
B1	Spain	10
Bronze medal match
B2	Italy	9
A2	Hungary	10

=== Quarterfinals ===
All times are CEST (UTC+2).

22 July 2014; 16:30	Report	Hungary	11–7	Russia	Alfréd Hajós National Swimming Stadium, Budapest; Referees: Bender (GER), Margeta (SLO)
22 July 2014; 16:30	Report	Score by quarters: 2–1, 4–1, 3–3, 2–2			Alfréd Hajós National Swimming Stadium, Budapest; Referees: Bender (GER), Margeta (SLO)
22 July 2014; 16:30	Report	Antal 3	Goals	Grineva 2	Alfréd Hajós National Swimming Stadium, Budapest; Referees: Bender (GER), Margeta (SLO)

22 July 2014; 18:00	Report	Italy	11–9	Greece	Alfréd Hajós National Swimming Stadium, Budapest; Referees: Schwartz (ISR), Alexandrescu (ROU)
22 July 2014; 18:00	Report	Score by quarters: 2–2, 3–2, 1–2, 1–1 PSO: 4–2			Alfréd Hajós National Swimming Stadium, Budapest; Referees: Schwartz (ISR), Alexandrescu (ROU)
22 July 2014; 18:00	Report	Di Mario, Bianconi 2	Goals	Asimaki 2	Alfréd Hajós National Swimming Stadium, Budapest; Referees: Schwartz (ISR), Alexandrescu (ROU)

=== 7th place match ===
All times are CEST (UTC+2).

22 July 2014; 15:00	Report	Great Britain	5–8	France	Alfréd Hajós National Swimming Stadium, Budapest; Referees: Dreval (RUS), Dutilh-Dumas (NED)
22 July 2014; 15:00	Report	Score by quarters: 1–3, 2–1, 1–3, 1–1			Alfréd Hajós National Swimming Stadium, Budapest; Referees: Dreval (RUS), Dutilh-Dumas (NED)
22 July 2014; 15:00	Report	Gibson-Byrne 3	Goals	Guillet 2	Alfréd Hajós National Swimming Stadium, Budapest; Referees: Dreval (RUS), Dutilh-Dumas (NED)

=== 5th place match ===
All times are CEST (UTC+2).

24 July 2014; 15:00	Report	Russia	7–5	Greece	Alfréd Hajós National Swimming Stadium, Budapest; Referees: Taylor (GBR), Grandin (FRA)
24 July 2014; 15:00	Report	Score by quarters: 3–3, 3–1, 0–1, 1–0			Alfréd Hajós National Swimming Stadium, Budapest; Referees: Taylor (GBR), Grandin (FRA)
24 July 2014; 15:00	Report	Prokofyeva 3	Goals	five players 1	Alfréd Hajós National Swimming Stadium, Budapest; Referees: Taylor (GBR), Grandin (FRA)

=== Semifinals ===
All times are CEST (UTC+2).

24 July 2014; 16:30	Report	Hungary	8–9	Spain	Alfréd Hajós National Swimming Stadium, Budapest; Referees: Ćirić (SRB), Franulović (CRO)
24 July 2014; 16:30	Report	Score by quarters: 2–2, 3–3, 2–3, 1–1			Alfréd Hajós National Swimming Stadium, Budapest; Referees: Ćirić (SRB), Franulović (CRO)
24 July 2014; 16:30	Report	Keszthelyi 4	Goals	García 4	Alfréd Hajós National Swimming Stadium, Budapest; Referees: Ćirić (SRB), Franulović (CRO)

24 July 2014; 18:00	Report	Italy	11–12	Netherlands	Alfréd Hajós National Swimming Stadium, Budapest; Referees: Naumov (RUS), Margeta (SLO)
24 July 2014; 18:00	Report	Score by quarters: 1–1, 4–4, 2–1, 1–2 PSO: 3–4			Alfréd Hajós National Swimming Stadium, Budapest; Referees: Naumov (RUS), Margeta (SLO)
24 July 2014; 18:00	Report	Garibotti 2	Goals	Smit, Van der Sloot 2	Alfréd Hajós National Swimming Stadium, Budapest; Referees: Naumov (RUS), Margeta (SLO)

=== Bronze medal match ===
All times are CEST (UTC+2).

26 July 2014; 16:30	Report	Hungary	10–9	Italy	Alfréd Hajós National Swimming Stadium, Budapest; Referees: Dutilh-Dumas (NED), Teixido (ESP)
26 July 2014; 16:30	Report	Score by quarters: 2–3, 5–2, 0–2, 3–2			Alfréd Hajós National Swimming Stadium, Budapest; Referees: Dutilh-Dumas (NED), Teixido (ESP)
26 July 2014; 16:30	Report	Antal 3	Goals	Bianconi 3	Alfréd Hajós National Swimming Stadium, Budapest; Referees: Dutilh-Dumas (NED), Teixido (ESP)

=== Gold medal match ===
All times are CEST (UTC+2).

26 July 2014; 18:00	Report	Spain	10–5	Netherlands	Alfréd Hajós National Swimming Stadium, Budapest; Referees: Taccini (ITA), Stavropoulos (GRE)
26 July 2014; 18:00	Report	Score by quarters: 3–3, 2–0, 2–2, 3–0			Alfréd Hajós National Swimming Stadium, Budapest; Referees: Taccini (ITA), Stavropoulos (GRE)
26 July 2014; 18:00	Report	García 3 Espar, Tarragó, Blas 2 Miranda 1	Goals	Van der Sloot 3 Megens, Sevenich 1	Alfréd Hajós National Swimming Stadium, Budapest; Referees: Taccini (ITA), Stavropoulos (GRE)

== Final ranking ==
Rank	Team
Gold medal	Spain
Silver medal	Netherlands
Bronze medal	Hungary
4	Italy
5	Russia
6	Greece
7	France
8	Great Britain

2014 Women's European Water Polo champion

Spain
First title

Team Roster

Laura Ester, Marta Bach, Anni Espar, Roser Tarragó, Mati Ortiz, Jennifer Pareja (C), Lorena Miranda, Pili Peña, Andrea Blas, Ona Meseguer, Maica García, Laura López
Patricia Herrera. Head coach: Miki Oca

== Awards and statistics ==
=== Top goalscorers ===
Rank	Name	Team	Goals	Shots	%
1	Rita Keszthelyi	Hungary	19	47	40.4%
2	Roser Tarragó	Spain	16	37	43.2%
3	Maica García	Spain	14	23	60.9%
4	Roberta Bianconi	Italy	13	30	43.3%
4	Ekaterina Prokofyeva	Russia	13	28	46.4%
6	Barbara Bujka	Hungary	12	31	38.7%
7	Dóra Antal	Hungary	11	32	34.4%
7	Tania Di Mario	Italy	11	33	33.3%
7	Sabrina van der Sloot	Netherlands	11	28	39.3%
10	Ciara Gibson-Byrne	Great Britain	10	19	52.6%
10	Elvina Karimova	Russia	10	22	45.5%
10	Lieke Klaassen	Netherlands	10	24	41.7%

== Individual awards ==
- Most Valuable Player
  - Maica García (ESP)
- Best Goalkeeper
  - Giulia Gorlero (ITA)
- Top Scorer
  - Rita Keszthelyi (HUN) — 19 goals
