= Lorena Miranda =

Spanish water polo player (born 1991)

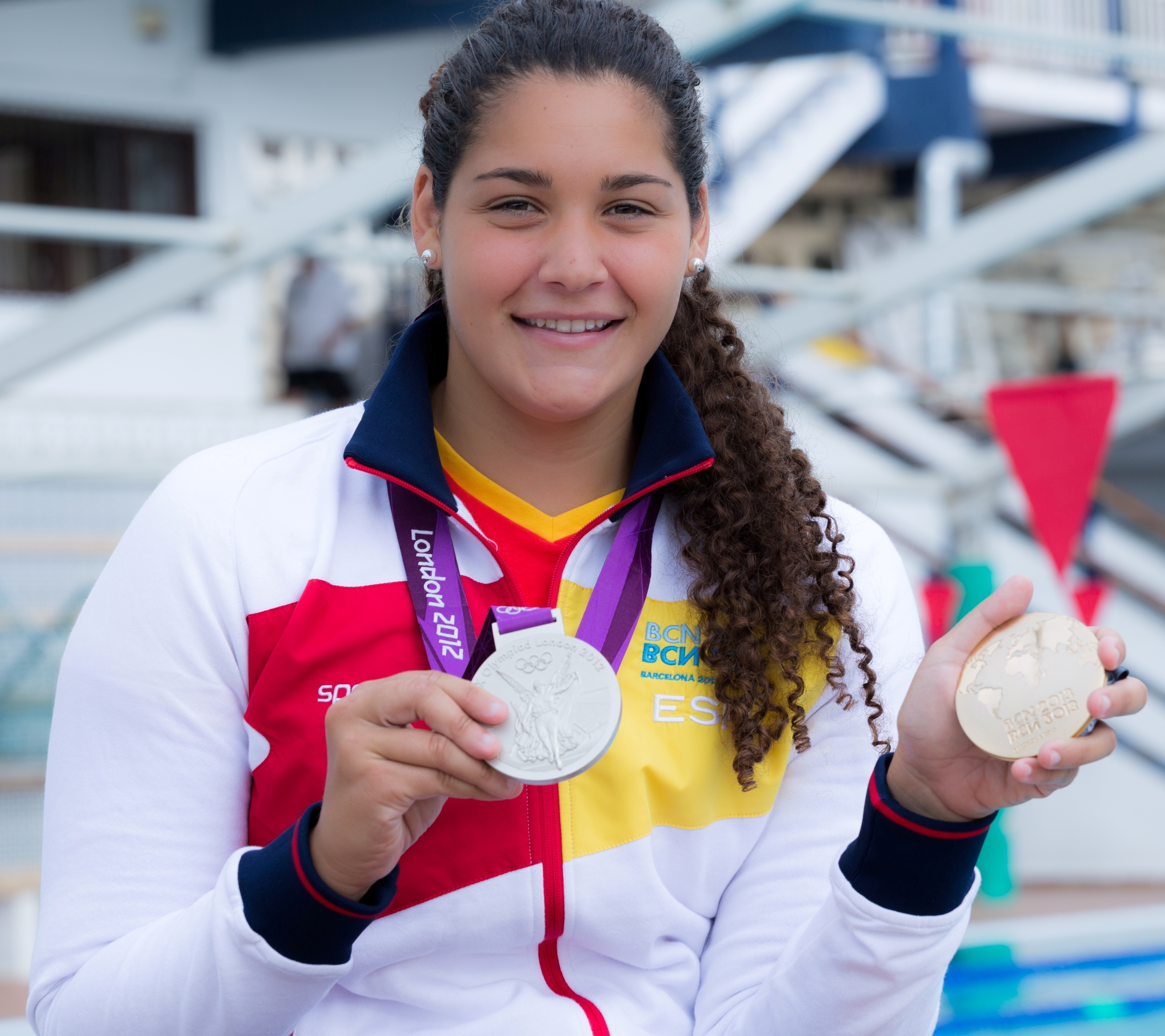
- Miranda in 2013

Personal information
- Full name: Lorena Miranda Dorado
- Born: 7 April 1991 (age 35) Ceuta, Spain
- Height: 174 cm (5 ft 9 in)
- Weight: 73 kg (161 lb)

Sport
- Sport: Water polo
- Number: 7
National team
- Years: Team
- 2014: Spain
Medal record
Women's water polo
Representing Spain
Olympic Games
Silver medal – second place	2012 London	Team
World Championships
Gold medal – first place	2013 Barcelona	Team
European Championships
Gold medal – first place	2014 Budapest	Team
World Cup
Bronze medal – third place	2014 Khanty-Mansiysk	Team

Lorena Miranda Dorado (born 7 April 1991) is a Spanish water polo player, born in Ceuta. At the 2012 Summer Olympics, she competed for the Spain women's national water polo team in the women's event, winning the silver medal. She is 5 feet 8.5 inches (174.0 cm) tall. On 22 June 2019, she took office as Minister of Youth and Sport of the Government of Ceuta.

== Education ==
She has a degree in Physical and Sport Activity from the Pablo de Olavide University and a license as water polo coach.

== See also ==
- List of Olympic medalists in water polo (women)
- List of world champions in women's water polo
- List of World Aquatics Championships medalists in water polo
