= Patricia Herrera =

Spanish water polo player (born 1993)

Personal information
- Full name: Patricia Herrera Fernandez
- Nationality: Spanish
- Born: 9 February 1993 (age 33)
- Height: 163 cm (64 in)
- Weight: 58 kg (128 lb)

Sport
- Sport: Water polo
- Position: Goalkeeper
- Number: 13
National team
- Years: Team
- 2013-: Spain
Medal record
Women's water polo
Representing Spain
World Championships
Gold medal – first place	2013 Barcelona	Team
European Championships
Gold medal – first place	2014 Budapest	Team

Patricia Herrera Fernandez (Note: In this Spanish name, the first or paternal surname is Herrera and the second or maternal family name is Fernandez.) (born 9 February 1993) is a Spanish water polo goalkeeper.

She was part of the Spanish team at the 2013 and 2015 World Aquatics Championships.

== See also ==
- Spain women's Olympic water polo team records and statistics
- List of women's Olympic water polo tournament goalkeepers
- List of world champions in women's water polo
- List of World Aquatics Championships medalists in water polo
