= Hazel Musgrove =

British water polo player

Personal information
- Born: 6 February 1989 (age 37) Watford, Great Britain

Sport
- Sport: Water polo

Hazel Musgrove (born 6 February 1989) is a British water polo player. She competed for Great Britain in the women's tournament at the 2012 Summer Olympics. This was the first ever Olympic GB women's water polo team.
