= Laura López (water polo) =

Spanish water polo player (born 1988)

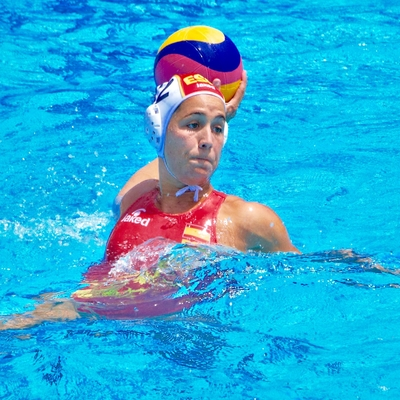
- López in 2013

Personal information
- Full name: Laura López Ventosa
- Born: 13 January 1988 (age 38) Madrid, Spain
- Height: 5 ft (1.5 m)
- Weight: 139 lb (63 kg)

Sport
- Sport: Water polo
- Position: Driver
- Number: 12
National team
- Years: Team
- 2006—2016: Spain
Medal record
Olympic Games
Silver medal – second place	2012 London	Team
World Championships
Gold medal – first place	2013 Barcelona	Team
European Championships
Gold medal – first place	2014 Budapest	Team
Silver medal – second place	2008 Malaga	Team
- Updated on 12 June 2019

Laura López Ventosa (Note: In this Spanish name, the first or paternal surname is López and the second or maternal family name is Ventosa.) (born 13 January 1988) is a Spanish water polo player. At the 2012 Summer Olympics, she competed for the Spain women's national water polo team in the women's event, where they won the silver medal. She is 5 ft 7 in (1.70 m) inches tall.

== See also ==
- List of Olympic medalists in water polo (women)
- List of world champions in women's water polo
- List of World Aquatics Championships medalists in water polo
