= Ona Meseguer =

Spanish water polo player (born 1988)

Personal information
- Full name: Ona Meseguer Flaqué
- Born: 20 February 1988 (age 38) Barcelona, Spain
- Height: 167 cm (66 in)
- Weight: 62 kg (137 lb)

Sport
- Sport: Water polo
National team
- Years: Team
- 2006-2014: Spain
Medal record
Women's water polo
Representing Spain
Olympic Games
Silver medal – second place	2012 London	Team
World Championships
Gold medal – first place	2013 Barcelona	Team
European Championships
Gold medal – first place	2014 Budapest	Team
Silver medal – second place	2008 Malaga	Team

Ona Meseguer Flaqué (born 20 February 1988) is a Spanish waterpolo player. At the 2012 Summer Olympics, she competed for the Spain women's national water polo team in the women's event winning the silver medal.

== See also ==
- List of Olympic medalists in water polo (women)
- List of world champions in women's water polo
- List of World Aquatics Championships medalists in water polo
