= Matilde Ortiz =

Spanish water polo player (born 1990)

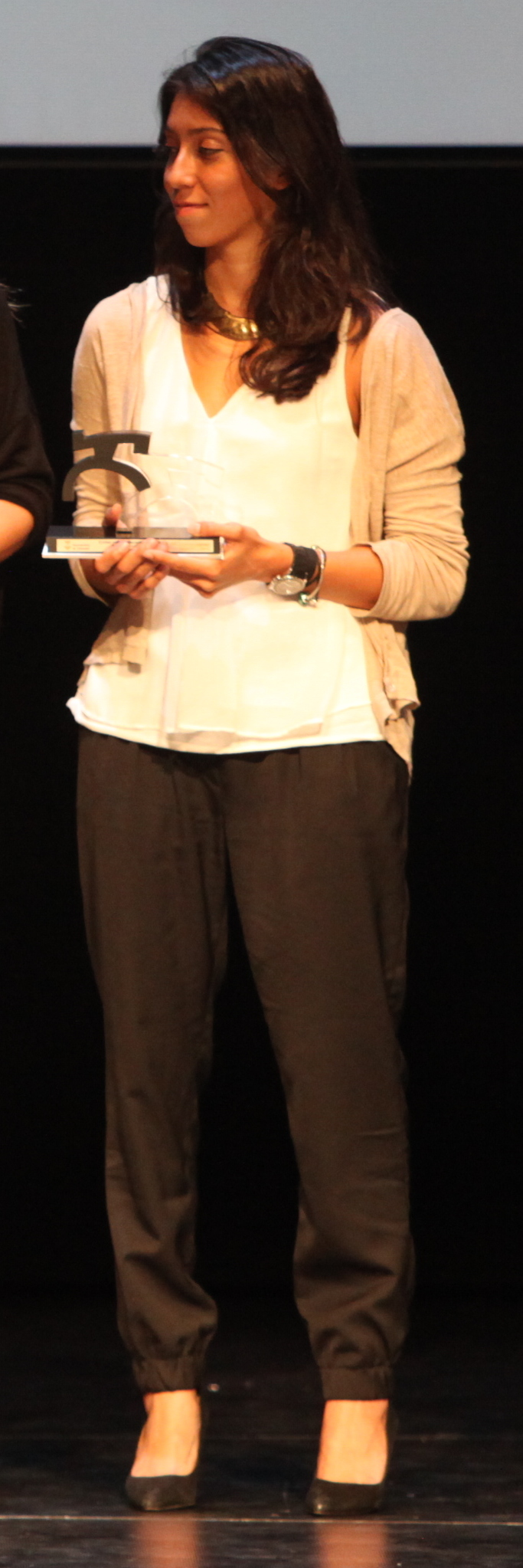

Personal information
- Born: 16 September 1990 (age 35) Veracruz, Mexico

Sport
- Sport: Water polo
Medal record
Representing Spain
Olympic Games
Silver medal – second place	2012 London	Team
World Championships
Gold medal – first place	2013 Barcelona	Team
Silver medal – second place	2017 Budapest	Team
European Championships
Gold medal – first place	2014 Budapest
World Cup
Bronze medal – third place	2014 Khanty-Mansiysk

Matilde Ortiz Reyes (born 16 September 1990) is a Spanish water polo player of Mexican descent. At the 2012 Summer Olympics, she won a silver medal competing for the Spain women's national water polo team in the women's event. She also competed for Spain at the 2016 Summer Olympics. She is 5 ft 8.5 inches tall. She plays for the Spanish club CN Sabadell, and is studying journalism at the Autonomous University of Barcelona.

== See also ==
- List of Olympic medalists in water polo (women)
- List of world champions in women's water polo
- List of World Aquatics Championships medalists in water polo
