= Marta Bach =

Spanish water polo player (born 1993)

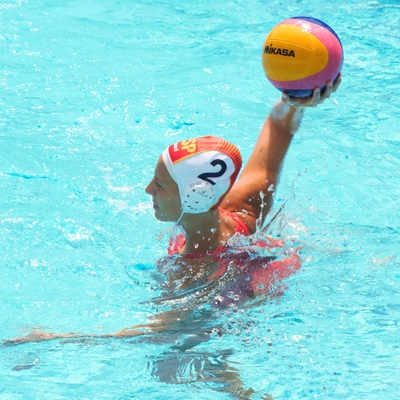
- Bach in 2013

Personal information
- Born: 17 February 1993 (age 33) Mataró, Spain
- Height: 5 ft 9 in (175 cm)

Sport
- Sport: Water polo
Medal record
Representing Spain
Olympic Games
Silver medal – second place	2012 London	Team
Silver medal – second place	2020 Tokyo	Team
World Championships
Gold medal – first place	2013 Barcelona	Team
Silver medal – second place	2017 Budapest	Team
Silver medal – second place	2019 Gwangju	Team
European Championships
Gold medal – first place	2014 Budapest
Gold medal – first place	2020 Budapest
World Cup
Bronze medal – third place	2014 Khanty-Mansiysk

Marta Bach Pascual (born 17 February 1993) is a Spanish water polo player.

She competed for the Spain women's national water polo team in the 2012 Summer Olympics, and 2017 World Aquatics Championships.

== See also ==
- List of Olympic medalists in water polo (women)
- List of world champions in women's water polo
- List of World Aquatics Championships medalists in water polo
