= Louise Guillet =

French water polo player

Personal information
- Born: 31 January 1986 (age 40) Limoges, France
- Height: 1.75 m (5 ft 9 in)
- Weight: 70 kg (154 lb)

Sport
- Country: France
- Sport: Water polo

Louise Guillet (born 31 January 1986 Limoges) is a French water polo player.

== Life ==
She was captain of the France women's national water polo team at the 2017 World Aquatics Championships. and 2018 Women's European Water Polo Championship.
