= Maica García Godoy =

Spanish water polo player (born 1990)

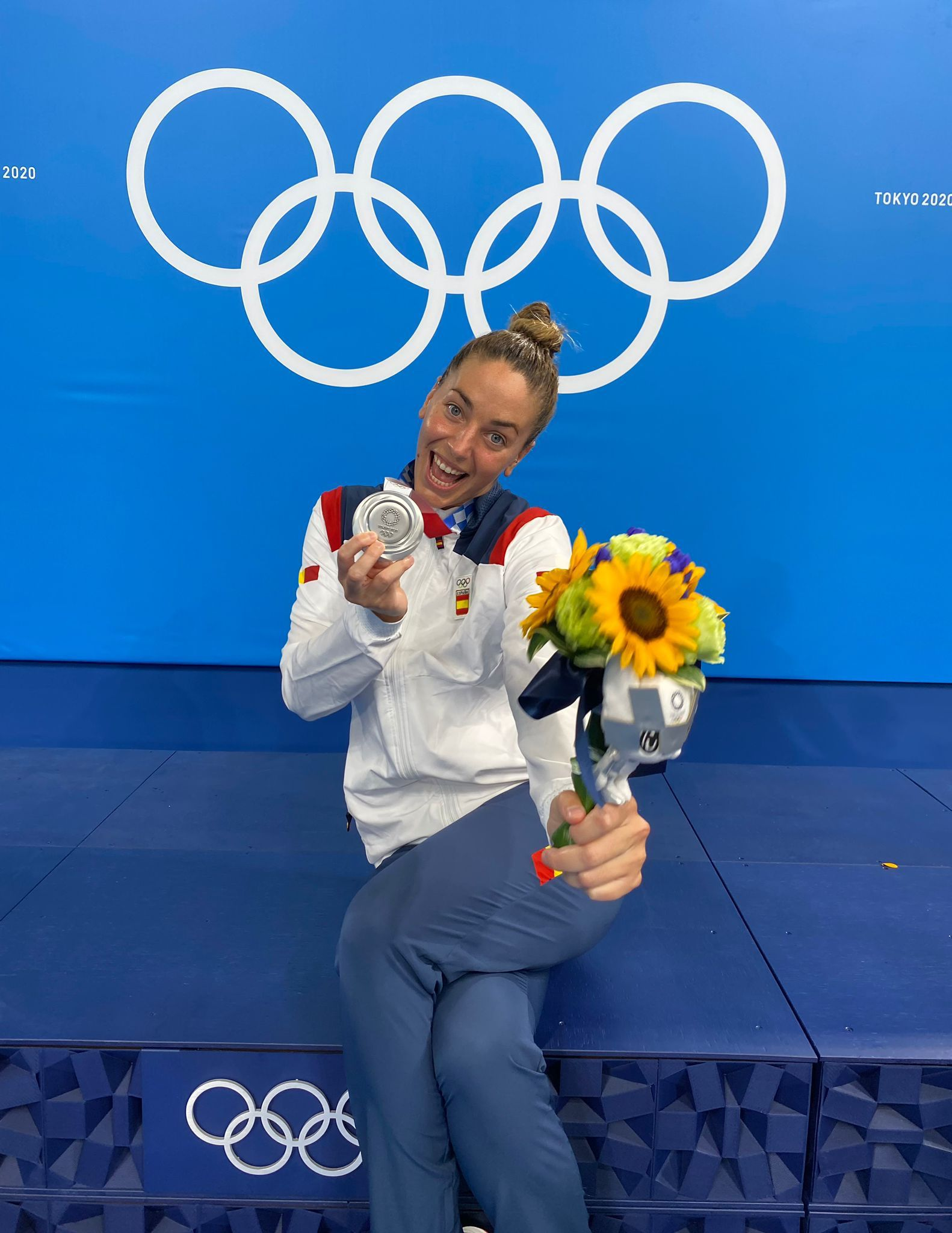
- Godoy at the 2020 Summer Olympics

Personal information
- Full name: María del Carmen García Godoy
- Nationality: Spanish
- Born: 17 October 1990 (age 36) Sabadell, Spain
- Height: 1.88 m (6 ft 2 in)
- Weight: 90 kg (198 lb)

Sport
- Sport: Water polo
- Current club: CN Sabadell
Medal record
Women's water polo
Representing Spain
Olympic Games
Gold medal – first place	2024 Paris	Team
Silver medal – second place	2012 London	Team
Silver medal – second place	2020 Tokyo	Team
World Championships
Gold medal – first place	2013 Barcelona	Team
Silver medal – second place	2019 Gwangju	Team
Silver medal – second place	2023 Fukuoka	Team
Bronze medal – third place	2024 Doha	Team
European Championships
Gold medal – first place	2014 Budapest
Gold medal – first place	2020 Budapest
Gold medal – first place	2022 Split
Silver medal – second place	2008 Malaga
Silver medal – second place	2024 Eindhoven
Bronze medal – third place	2018 Barcelona
World Cup
Bronze medal – third place	2023 Long Beach

María del Carmen "Maica" García Godoy (born 17 October 1990) is a Spanish water polo player, playing at the centre forward position. She is 6 ft 2 in (1.88 m) tall and she plays for the Spanish club CN Sabadell. Maica is part of the Spain national team.

== Honours ==
Godoy has won the "Triple Crown" and 13 medals in these three major competitions, three Olympics, four World Championships, and six European Championships.

== See also ==
- List of Olympic medalists in water polo (women)
- List of world champions in women's water polo
- List of World Aquatics Championships medalists in water polo

Awards
Preceded by (Spain) Jennifer Pareja	LEN European Water Polo Player of the Year; 2014	Succeeded by (Italy) Roberta Bianconi
