= 2016 FINA Women's Water Polo World League =

- League: FINA Water Polo World League
- Sport: Water Polo
- Duration: November 2015-June 2016

Super Final
- Finals champions: United States (10 title)
- Runners-up: Spain

FINA Women's Water Polo World League seasons
- ← 2015 2017 →

The 2016 FINA Women's Water Polo World League was the 13th edition of the annual women's international water polo tournament. It was played between November 2015 and June 2016 and open to all women's water polo national teams. After participating in a preliminary round, eight teams qualify to play in a final tournament, called the Super Final in Shanghai, China from 07–12 June 2016.

In the world league, there are specific rules that do not allow matches to end in a draw. If teams are level at the end of the 4th quarter of any world league match, the match will be decided by a penalty shootout. Teams earn points in the standings in group matches as follows:

- Match won in normal time - 3 points
- Match won in shootout - 2 points
- Match lost in shootout - 1 point
- Match lost in normal time - 0 points

== Europe ==
=== Preliminary round ===
The European preliminary round consisted of two group of four teams. The winner of each group after the home and away series of games qualifies for the Super Final. A third place is taken by the best scoring second-placed team.

==== Group A ====
| Team | GP | W | L | GF | GA | GD | Pts |
|---|---|---|---|---|---|---|---|
| Italy | 6 | 4 | 2 | 75 | 55 | +20 | 13 |
| Netherlands | 6 | 4 | 2 | 62 | 56 | +6 | 12 |
| Hungary | 6 | 4 | 2 | 63 | 52 | +11 | 11 |
| France | 6 | 0 | 6 | 35 | 72 | -37 | 0 |

| 22 Oct 2015; 20:15 | Netherlands | 11–10 | Italy | Nijverdal, Netherlands |
| 22 Oct 2015; 20:15 | Score by quarters: 1–2, 4–3, 2–4, 4–1 | | | Nijverdal, Netherlands |

| 27 Oct 2015; 18:45 | Netherlands | 12–7 | France | Amersfoort, Netherlands |
| 27 Oct 2015; 18:45 | Score by quarters: 2–3, 4–1, 3–2, 3–1 | | | Amersfoort, Netherlands |

| 27 Oct 2015; 20:00 | Hungary | 17–15 (OT) | Italy | Budapest, Hungary |
| 27 Oct 2015; 20:00 | Score by quarters: 6–3, 2–1, 2–5, 3–4 OT: 4–2 | | | Budapest, Hungary |

| 24 Nov 2015; 18:00 | Hungary | 7–10 | Netherlands | Budapest, Hungary |
| 24 Nov 2015; 18:00 | Score by quarters: 2–2, 2–1, 1–3, 2–4 | | | Budapest, Hungary |

| 24 Nov 2015; 20:30 | Italy | 15–5 | France | Avezzano, Italy |
| 24 Nov 2015; 20:30 | Score by quarters: 3–0, 6–2, 2–1, 4–2 | | | Avezzano, Italy |

| 8 Dec 2015; 20:30 | France | 9–18 | Hungary | Troyes, France |
| 8 Dec 2015; 20:30 | Score by quarters: 4–7, 3–5, 0–2, 2–4 | | | Troyes, France |

| 23 Feb 2016; 20:00 | France | 8–12 | Netherlands | Lille, France |
| 23 Feb 2016; 20:00 | Score by quarters: 3–4, 2–3, 2–2, 1–3 | | | Lille, France |

| 23 Feb 2016; 20:30 | Italy | 10–7 | Hungary | Novara, Italy |
| 23 Feb 2016; 20:30 | Score by quarters: 5–2, 4–3, 1–0, 0–2 | | | Novara, Italy |

| 12 Apr 2016; 20:00 | France | 5–10 | Italy | Abbeville, France |
| 12 Apr 2016; 20:00 | Score by quarters: 2–2, 1–2, 1–3, 1–3 | | | Abbeville, France |

| 12 Apr 2016; 20:30 | Netherlands | 7–9 | Hungary | Dordrecht, Netherlands |
| 12 Apr 2016; 20:30 | Score by quarters: 1–1, 3–2, 1–3, 2–3 | | | Dordrecht, Netherlands |

| 3 May 2016; 18:00 | Hungary | 5–1 | France | Budapest, Hungary |
| 3 May 2016; 18:00 | Score by quarters: 3–0, 0–0, 0–0, 2–1 | | | Budapest, Hungary |

| 3 May 2016; 20:15 | Italy | 15–10 | Netherlands | Bari, Italy |
| 3 May 2016; 20:15 | Score by quarters: 5–2, 3–2, 5–1, 2–5 | | | Bari, Italy |

===== Squads =====
- France

Squad as during the match on 12 April against Italy.

| No. | Name | Date of birth | Position | L/R |
|---|---|---|---|---|
| 1 | Lorene Derenty | 1994 | Goalkeeper | R |
| 2 | Yaelle Deschampt | 1997 | | R |
| 3 | Morgane Leroux | 1999 | | R |
| 4 | Aurore Sacre | 1993 | | R |
| 5 | Louise Guillet | 1986 | | R |
| 6 | Geraldine Mahieu | 1993 | | R |
| 7 | Marie Barbieux | 1991 | | R |
| 8 | Marion Tardy | 1993 | | R |
| 9 | Lucie Cesca | 1994 | | R |
| 10 | Audrey Daule | 1993 | | R |
| 11 | Clemence Clerc | 1991 | | R |
| 12 | Michaela Jaskova | 1993 | | R |
| 13 | Morgane Chabrier | 1993 | Goalkeeper | R |

- Italy

Squad as during the match on 12 April against France.

| No. | Name | Date of birth | Position | L/R |
|---|---|---|---|---|
| 1 | Giulia Gorlero | | Goalkeeper | R |
| 2 | Chiara Tabani | | | R |
| 3 | Arianna Garibotti | | | R |
| 4 | Elisa Queirolo | | | R |
| 5 | Federica Radicchi | | | R |
| 6 | Rosaria Aiello | | | R |
| 7 | Tania Di Mario | | | R |
| 8 | Roberta Bianconi | | | R |
| 9 | Giulia Enrica Emmolo | | | R |
| 10 | Francesca Pomeri | | | R |
| 11 | Aleksandra Cotti | | | R |
| 12 | Teresa Frassinetti | | | R |
| 13 | Laura Teani | | Goalkeeper | R |

==== Group B ====
| Team | GP | W | L | GF | GA | GD | Pts |
|---|---|---|---|---|---|---|---|
| Spain | 6 | 5 | 1 | 100 | 58 | +42 | 14 |
| Russia | 6 | 4 | 2 | 85 | 68 | +17 | 12 |
| Greece | 6 | 3 | 3 | 90 | 57 | +33 | 10 |
| Germany | 6 | 0 | 6 | 34 | 126 | -92 | 0 |

| 27 Oct 2015; 20:00 | Russia | 19–8 | Germany | Moscow, Russia |
| 27 Oct 2015; 20:00 | Score by quarters: 7–1, 5–4, 3–2, 4–1 | | | Moscow, Russia |

| 27 Oct 2015; 19:00 | Greece | 16–17 (OT) | Spain | Athens, Greece |
| 27 Oct 2015; 19:00 | Score by quarters: 1–1, 4–4, 2–2, 3–3 OT: 6–7 | | | Athens, Greece |

| 24 Nov 2015; 19:45 | Russia | 12–7 | Greece | Moscow, Russia |
| 24 Nov 2015; 19:45 | Score by quarters: 4–0, 3–2, 1–2, 4–2 | | | Moscow, Russia |

| 24 Nov 2015; 18:00 | Germany | 8–20 | Spain | Stuttgart, Germany |
| 24 Nov 2015; 18:00 | Score by quarters: 2–9, 4–3, 1–4, 1–4 | | | Stuttgart, Germany |

| 8 Dec 2015; 17:00 | Spain | 16–9 | Russia | Barcelona, Spain |
| 8 Dec 2015; 17:00 | Score by quarters: 4–1, 4–4, 5–2, 3–2 | | | Barcelona, Spain |

| 8 Dec 2015; 19:00 | Greece | 21–1 | Germany | Athens, Greece |
| 8 Dec 2015; 19:00 | Score by quarters: 5–0, 5–1, 6–0, 5–0 | | | Athens, Greece |

| 23 Feb 2016; 19:30 | Germany | 10–22 | Russia | Hamburg, Germany |
| 23 Feb 2016; 19:30 | Score by quarters: 2–5, 2–7, 4–5, 2–5 | | | Hamburg, Germany |

| 1 Mar 2016; 19:15 | Spain | 13–9 | Greece | Sabadell, Spain |
| 1 Mar 2016; 19:15 | Score by quarters: 2–2, 6–3, 2–4, 3–0 | | | Sabadell, Spain |

| 12 Apr 2016; 19:00 | Greece | 15–9 | Russia | Athens, Greece |
| 12 Apr 2016; 19:00 | Score by quarters: 2–2, 4–2, 5–1, 4–4 | | | Athens, Greece |

| 12 Apr 2016; 19:15 | Spain | 21–2 | Germany | Manresa, Spain |
| 12 Apr 2016; 19:15 | Score by quarters: 7–0, 5–1, 3–0, 6–1 | | | Manresa, Spain |

| 3 May 2016; 20:00 | Russia | 14–13 | Spain | Moscow, Russia |
| 3 May 2016; 20:00 | Score by quarters: 3–3, 3–4, 2–4, 6–2 | | | Moscow, Russia |

| 3 May 2016; 20:00 | Germany | 5–23 | Greece | Heidelberg, Germany |
| 3 May 2016; 20:00 | Score by quarters: 3–4, 0–8, 2–6, 0–5 | | | Heidelberg, Germany |

== Intercontinental Qualification Tournament ==
=== Preliminary round ===
| Team | GP | W | L | GF | GA | GD | Pts |
|---|---|---|---|---|---|---|---|
| United States | 5 | 5 | 0 | 77 | 18 | +59 | 15 |
| Australia | 5 | 4 | 1 | 69 | 27 | +42 | 12 |
| Canada | 5 | 3 | 2 | 54 | 56 | -2 | 9 |
| China | 5 | 2 | 3 | 50 | 57 | -7 | 6 |
| Brazil | 5 | 1 | 4 | 28 | 64 | -36 | 3 |
| Japan | 5 | 0 | 5 | 28 | 84 | -56 | 0 |

| 16 Feb 2016; 16:40 | Australia | 12–10 | China | Lewisville, Texas, United States |
| 16 Feb 2016; 16:40 | Score by quarters: 3–2, 2–3, 4–2, 3–3 | | | Lewisville, Texas, United States |

| 16 Feb 2016; 18:00 | Brazil | 2–17 | United States | Lewisville, Texas, United States |
| 16 Feb 2016; 18:00 | Score by quarters: 1–3, 1–8, 0–4, 0–2 | | | Lewisville, Texas, United States |

| 16 Feb 2016; 19:20 | Japan | 10–19 | Canada | Lewisville, Texas, United States |
| 16 Feb 2016; 19:20 | Score by quarters: 3–6, 3–3, 1–4, 3–6 | | | Lewisville, Texas, United States |

| 17 Feb 2016; 16:40 | Canada | 2–11 | Australia | Lewisville, Texas, United States |
| 17 Feb 2016; 16:40 | Score by quarters: 0–2, 2–4, 0–2, 0–3 | | | Lewisville, Texas, United States |

| 17 Feb 2016; 18:00 | Brazil | 10–7 | Japan | Lewisville, Texas, United States |
| 17 Feb 2016; 18:00 | Score by quarters: 3–1, 2–0, 2–3, 3–3 | | | Lewisville, Texas, United States |

| 17 Feb 2016; 19:20 | United States | 19–5 | China | Lewisville, Texas, United States |
| 17 Feb 2016; 19:20 | Score by quarters: 5–1, 5–0, 5–2, 4–2 | | | Lewisville, Texas, United States |

| 18 Feb 2016; 16:40 | China | 14–15 | Canada | Lewisville, Texas, United States |
| 18 Feb 2016; 16:40 | Score by quarters: 3–3, 2–5, 3–2, 6–5 | | | Lewisville, Texas, United States |

| 18 Feb 2016; 18:00 | Japan | 2–19 | United States | Lewisville, Texas, United States |
| 18 Feb 2016; 18:00 | Score by quarters: 1–9, 0–2, 1–4, 0–4 | | | Lewisville, Texas, United States |

| 18 Feb 2016; 19:20 | Australia | 15–3 | Brazil | Lewisville, Texas, United States |
| 18 Feb 2016; 19:20 | Score by quarters: 1–0, 4–2, 6–1, 4–0 | | | Lewisville, Texas, United States |

| 19 Feb 2016; 16:40 | Brazil | 6–11 | China | Lewisville, Texas, United States |
| 19 Feb 2016; 16:40 | Score by quarters: 3–3, 2–3, 1–2, 0–3 | | | Lewisville, Texas, United States |

| 19 Feb 2016; 18:00 | Japan | 4–26 | Australia | Lewisville, Texas, United States |
| 19 Feb 2016; 18:00 | Score by quarters: 2–5, 0–4, 2–10, 0–7 | | | Lewisville, Texas, United States |

| 19 Feb 2016; 19:20 | United States | 14–4 | Canada | Lewisville, Texas, United States |
| 19 Feb 2016; 19:20 | Score by quarters: 6–3, 5–1, 1–0, 2–0 | | | Lewisville, Texas, United States |

| 20 Feb 2016; 16:40 | China | 10–5 | Japan | Lewisville, Texas, United States |
| 20 Feb 2016; 16:40 | Score by quarters: 3–2, 0–1, 4–2, 3–0 | | | Lewisville, Texas, United States |

| 20 Feb 2016; 18:00 | Brazil | 7–14 | Canada | Lewisville, Texas, United States |
| 20 Feb 2016; 18:00 | Score by quarters: 1–3, 3–4, 2–2, 1–5 | | | Lewisville, Texas, United States |

| 20 Feb 2016; 19:20 | Australia | 5–8 | United States | Lewisville, Texas, United States |
| 20 Feb 2016; 19:20 | Score by quarters: 0–3, 0–3, 3–1, 2–1 | | | Lewisville, Texas, United States |

==== 5th place ====
| 21 Feb 2016; 10:00 | Brazil | 9–8 | Japan | Lewisville, Texas, United States |
| 21 Feb 2016; 10:00 | Score by quarters: 2–1, 3–2, 2–2, 2–3 | | | Lewisville, Texas, United States |

==== 3rd Place ====
| 21 Feb 2016; 11:20 | Canada | 6–10 | China | Lewisville, Texas, United States |
| 21 Feb 2016; 11:20 | Score by quarters: 1–2, 1–3, 2–1, 2–4 | | | Lewisville, Texas, United States |

==== Final ====
| 21 Feb 2016; 12:40 | United States | 6–5 | Australia | Lewisville, Texas, United States |
| 21 Feb 2016; 12:40 | Score by quarters: 3–0, 1–3, 1–1, 1–1 | | | Lewisville, Texas, United States |

== Super Final ==
In the Super Final the eight qualifying teams are split into two groups of four teams with all teams progressing to the knock-out stage. The games were played in Shanghai, China from 7 to 12 June 2016.

=== Qualified teams ===
| Africa | Americas | Asia | Europe | Oceania |
|---|---|---|---|---|
| — | Brazil; Canada; United States | China (Host) | Italy; Russia; Spain | Australia |

=== Group A ===
| Team | GP | W | L | GF | GA | GD | Pts |
|---|---|---|---|---|---|---|---|
| Australia | 3 | 3 | 0 | 34 | 20 | +14 | 9 |
| China | 3 | 2 | 1 | 20 | 25 | -5 | 6 |
| Italy | 3 | 1 | 2 | 23 | 29 | -6 | 3 |
| Russia | 3 | 0 | 3 | 26 | 29 | -3 | 0 |

| 7 Jun 2016; 17:40 | Australia | 11–10 | Russia | Shanghai, China |
| 7 Jun 2016; 17:40 | Score by quarters: 3–4, 2–1, 3–1, 3–4 | | | Shanghai, China |

| 7 Jun 2016; 19:30 | Italy | 7–8 | China | Shanghai, China |
| 7 Jun 2016; 19:30 | Score by quarters: 2–2, 3–3, 2–1, 0–2 | | | Shanghai, China |

| 8 Jun 2016; 16:20 | Italy | 9–8 | Russia | Shanghai, China |
| 8 Jun 2016; 16:20 | Score by quarters: 3–0, 3–3, 2–2, 1–3 | | | Shanghai, China |

| 8 Jun 2016; 19:00 | Australia | 10–3 | China | Shanghai, China |
| 8 Jun 2016; 19:00 | Score by quarters: 2–0, 1–1, 4–1, 3–1 | | | Shanghai, China |

| 9 Jun 2016; 16:20 | Italy | 7–13 | Australia | Shanghai, China |
| 9 Jun 2016; 16:20 | Score by quarters: 1–3, 2–3, 2–3, 2–4 | | | Shanghai, China |

| 9 Jun 2016; 19:00 | China | 9–8 | Russia | Shanghai, China |
| 9 Jun 2016; 19:00 | Score by quarters: 2–1, 4–2, 1–2, 2–3 | | | Shanghai, China |

=== Group B ===
| Team | GP | W | L | GF | GA | GD | Pts |
|---|---|---|---|---|---|---|---|
| United States | 3 | 3 | 0 | 43 | 20 | +23 | 9 |
| Spain | 3 | 2 | 1 | 36 | 30 | +6 | 6 |
| Canada | 3 | 1 | 2 | 36 | 31 | +5 | 3 |
| Brazil | 3 | 0 | 3 | 12 | 46 | -34 | 0 |

| 7 Jun 2016; 15:00 | Spain | 16–12 | Canada | Shanghai, China |
| 7 Jun 2016; 15:00 | Score by quarters: 3–1, 6–6, 2–2, 5–3 | | | Shanghai, China |

| 7 Jun 2016; 16:20 | United States | 20–2 | Brazil | Shanghai, China |
| 7 Jun 2016; 16:20 | Score by quarters: 4–0, 7–0, 4–0, 5–2 | | | Shanghai, China |

| 8 Jun 2016; 15:00 | Spain | 10–6 | Brazil | Shanghai, China |
| 8 Jun 2016; 15:00 | Score by quarters: 2–1, 2–0, 3–3, 3–2 | | | Shanghai, China |

| 8 Jun 2016; 17:40 | United States | 11–8 | Canada | Shanghai, China |
| 8 Jun 2016; 17:40 | Score by quarters: 4–2, 4–3, 1–2, 2–1 | | | Shanghai, China |

| 9 Jun 2016; 15:00 | Spain | 10–12 | United States | Shanghai, China |
| 9 Jun 2016; 15:00 | Score by quarters: 3–4, 3–4, 2–2, 2–2 | | | Shanghai, China |

| 9 Jun 2016; 17:40 | Canada | 16–4 | Brazil | Shanghai, China |
| 9 Jun 2016; 17:40 | Score by quarters: 3–1, 3–0, 5–1, 5–2 | | | Shanghai, China |

=== Knockout stage ===
Quarterfinals
China | 13
Canada | 8
Russia | 7
United States | 14
Italy | 5
Spain | 8
Australia | 11
Brazil | 2

Semifinals
China | 5
United States | 11
Spain | 10
Australia | 8

Final
United States | 13
Spain | 9
Third place
Australia | 10
China | 3

5th–8th Places

Semifinals
Canada | 4
Russia | 15
Italy | 7
Brazil | 6

Fifth place
Russia | 8
Italy | 10
Seventh place
Canada | 12
Brazil | 6

==== Quarterfinals ====
| 10 Jun 2016; 15:00 | Italy | 5–8 | Spain | Shanghai, China |
| 10 Jun 2016; 15:00 | Score by quarters: 2–4, 0–1, 1–1, 2–2 | | | Shanghai, China |

| 10 Jun 2016; 16:20 | Australia | 11–2 | Brazil | Shanghai, China |
| 10 Jun 2016; 16:20 | Score by quarters: 3–0, 5–0, 3–0, 0–2 | | | Shanghai, China |

| 10 Jun 2016; 17:40 | Russia | 7–14 | United States | Shanghai, China |
| 10 Jun 2016; 17:40 | Score by quarters: 2–4, 2–4, 0–4, 3–2 | | | Shanghai, China |

| 10 Jun 2016; 19:00 | China | 13–8 | Canada | Shanghai, China |
| 10 Jun 2016; 19:00 | Score by quarters: 4–2, 2–1, 4–1, 3–4 | | | Shanghai, China |

==== 5th–8th Places Semifinals ====
| 11 Jun 2016; 15:00 | Italy | 7–6 | Brazil | Shanghai, China |
| 11 Jun 2016; 15:00 | Score by quarters: 1–4, 1–0, 4–1, 1–1 | | | Shanghai, China |

| 11 Jun 2016; 16:20 | Canada | 4–15 | Russia | Shanghai, China |
| 11 Jun 2016; 16:20 | Score by quarters: 0–4, 0–4, 1–3, 3–4 | | | Shanghai, China |

==== Semifinals ====
| 11 Jun 2016; 17:40 | Spain | 10–8 | Australia | Shanghai, China |
| 11 Jun 2016; 17:40 | Score by quarters: 3–4, 1–0, 3–3, 3–1 | | | Shanghai, China |

| 11 Jun 2016; 19:00 | China | 5–11 | United States | Shanghai, China |
| 11 Jun 2016; 19:00 | Score by quarters: 1–3, 1–2, 2–2, 1–4 | | | Shanghai, China |

==== 7th place ====
| 12 Jun 2016; 14:30 | Canada | 12–6 | Brazil | Shanghai, China |
| 12 Jun 2016; 14:30 | Score by quarters: 3–1, 3–0, 3–1, 3–4 | | | Shanghai, China |

==== 5th place ====
| 12 Jun 2016; 16:00 | Russia | 8–10 | Italy | Shanghai, China |
| 12 Jun 2016; 16:00 | Score by quarters: 3–5, 2–2, 1–1, 2–2 | | | Shanghai, China |

==== 3rd Place ====
| 12 Jun 2016; 17:30 | China | 3–10 | Australia | Shanghai, China |
| 12 Jun 2016; 17:30 | Score by quarters: 2–3, 1–5, 0–1, 0–1 | | | Shanghai, China |

==== Final ====
| 12 Jun 2016; 19:00 | United States | 13–9 | Spain | Shanghai, China |
| 12 Jun 2016; 19:00 | Score by quarters: 3–2, 4–2, 3–3, 3–2 | | | Shanghai, China |

=== Final ranking ===
| Rank | Team |
|---|---|
| Gold medal | United States |
| Silver medal | Spain |
| Bronze medal | Australia |
| 4 | China |
| 5 | Italy |
| 6 | Russia |
| 7 | Canada |
| 8 | Brazil |

2016 FINA Women's Water Polo World League

United States
Tenth title

Team Roster

Sami Hill, Maddie Musselman, Melissa Seidemann, Rachel Fattal, Caroline Clark, Maggie Steffens (C), Courtney Mathewson, Kiley Neushul, Aria Fischer, Kaleigh Gilchrist, Makenzie Fischer, Kami Craig, Ashleigh Johnson, Alys Williams. Head coach: Adam Krikorian.
