= 2014 FINA Women's Water Polo World Cup =

Tournament details
- Host country: Russia
- Venue: 1 (in 1 host city)
- Dates: 12-17 August 2014
- Teams: 8 (from 4 confederations)

Final positions
- Champions: United States (3rd title)
- Runners-up: Australia
- Third place: Spain
- Fourth place: China

Tournament statistics
- Matches played: 24
- Goals scored: 510 (21.25 per match)
- Top scorer(s): (Hungary) Rita Keszthelyi (22 goals)

Awards
- Best player: (Australia) Rowena Webster

The 2014 FINA Women's Water Polo World Cup was the 16th edition of the event, organised by the world's governing body in aquatics, the International Swimming Federation (FINA). The event took place in Khanty-Mansiysk, Russia from 12 to 17 August 2014.

The United States won the gold medal, after defeating Australia 10-6 in the final. Spain captured bronze, beating China 7-5.

== Format ==
8 teams qualified for the 2014 FINA World Cup. They are split into two groups of 4 teams. After playing a round-robin every team advanced to the quarterfinals. The best ranked team of Group A played against the fourth ranked team of Group B, the second ranked team of Group A against the third ranked team of Group B the third ranked team of Group A against the second ranked team of Group B and the fourth ranked team of Group A against the best ranked team of Group B. The winners of those quarterfinals advanced to the semis and played out the champion while the losers of the quarterfinals competed in placement matches.

== Groups ==
| Group A | Group B |
|---|---|
| Spain; Russia; China; Singapore | United States; Hungary; Australia; South Africa |

== Preliminary round ==
=== Group A ===
All times are YEKT (UTC+5)

| | Team | G | W | D | L | GF | GA | Diff | Points |
|---|---|---|---|---|---|---|---|---|---|
| 1. | Spain | 3 | 2 | 0 | 1 | 52 | 15 | +37 | 4 |
| 2. | China | 3 | 2 | 0 | 1 | 41 | 26 | +15 | 4 |
| 3. | Russia | 3 | 2 | 0 | 1 | 55 | 22 | +33 | 4 |
| 4. | Singapore | 3 | 0 | 0 | 3 | 6 | 91 | −85 | 0 |

| 12 August 2014; 16:00 | Spain | 34–3 | Singapore | Khanty-Mansiysk, Russia |
| 12 August 2014; 16:00 | Score by quarters: 7-1, 8-0, 9-0, 10-2 | | | Khanty-Mansiysk, Russia |

| 12 August 2014; 18:00 | Russia | 13–14 | China | Khanty-Mansiysk, Russia |
| 12 August 2014; 18:00 | Score by quarters: 4-1, 3-6, 2-2, 4-5 | | | Khanty-Mansiysk, Russia |

| 13 August 2014; 13:30 | Spain | 12–5 | China | Khanty-Mansiysk, Russia |
| 13 August 2014; 13:30 | Score by quarters: 2-1, 4-2, 4-2, 2-0 | | | Khanty-Mansiysk, Russia |

| 13 August 2014; 18:00 | Russia | 35–2 | Singapore | Khanty-Mansiysk, Russia |
| 13 August 2014; 18:00 | Score by quarters: 9-1, 9-0, 9-0, 8-1 | | | Khanty-Mansiysk, Russia |

| 14 August 2014; 16:30 | China | 22–1 | Singapore | Khanty-Mansiysk, Russia |
| 14 August 2014; 16:30 | Score by quarters: 5-0, 7-0, 5-0, 5-1 | | | Khanty-Mansiysk, Russia |

| 14 August 2014; 18:00 | Russia | 7–6 | Spain | Khanty-Mansiysk, Russia |
| 14 August 2014; 18:00 | Score by quarters: 2-1, 1-1, 2-2, 2-2 | | | Khanty-Mansiysk, Russia |

=== Group B ===
All times are YEKT (UTC+5)

| | Team | G | W | D | L | GF | GA | Diff | Points |
|---|---|---|---|---|---|---|---|---|---|
| 1. | United States | 3 | 3 | 0 | 0 | 41 | 17 | +24 | 6 |
| 2. | Australia | 3 | 2 | 0 | 1 | 36 | 17 | +19 | 4 |
| 3. | Hungary | 3 | 1 | 0 | 2 | 42 | 28 | +14 | 2 |
| 4. | South Africa | 3 | 0 | 0 | 3 | 6 | 63 | -57 | 0 |

| 12 August 2014; 13:00 | Hungary | 7–10 | Australia | Khanty-Mansiysk, Russia |
| 12 August 2014; 13:00 | Score by quarters: 2-3, 2-2, 3-1, 0-4 | | | Khanty-Mansiysk, Russia |

| 12 August 2014; 14:30 | United States | 18–1 | South Africa | Khanty-Mansiysk, Russia |
| 12 August 2014; 14:30 | Score by quarters: 3-0, 5-0, 7-0, 3-1 | | | Khanty-Mansiysk, Russia |

| 13 August 2014; 15:00 | Hungary | 25–3 | South Africa | Khanty-Mansiysk, Russia |
| 13 August 2014; 15:00 | Score by quarters: 6-2, 4-1, 8-0, 7-0 | | | Khanty-Mansiysk, Russia |

| 13 August 2014; 16:30 | United States | 8–6 | Australia | Khanty-Mansiysk, Russia |
| 13 August 2014; 16:30 | Score by quarters: 2-0, 3-2, 2-2, 1-2 | | | Khanty-Mansiysk, Russia |

| 14 August 2014; 13:30 | Hungary | 10–15 | United States | Khanty-Mansiysk, Russia |
| 14 August 2014; 13:30 | Score by quarters: 2-4, 1-3, 4-5, 3-3 | | | Khanty-Mansiysk, Russia |

| 14 August 2014; 15:00 | Australia | 20–2 | South Africa | Khanty-Mansiysk, Russia |
| 14 August 2014; 15:00 | Score by quarters: 4-0, 5-1, 5-0, 6-1 | | | Khanty-Mansiysk, Russia |

== Final rounds ==
5th place bracket

Semi-finals
16 August
Hungary | 42
Singapore | 0
16 August
Russia | 22
South Africa | 2

Fifth place
17 August
Hungary | 14
Russia | 11
Seventh place
17 August
Singapore | 6
South Africa | 11

=== 5th–8th place classification ===
All times are YEKT (UTC+5)

| 16 August 2014; 15:00 | Hungary | 42–0 | Singapore | Khanty-Mansiysk, Russia |
| 16 August 2014; 15:00 | Score by quarters: 14-0, 11-0, 7-0, 10-0 | | | Khanty-Mansiysk, Russia |

| 16 August 2014; 16:30 | Russia | 22–2 | South Africa | Khanty-Mansiysk, Russia |
| 16 August 2014; 16:30 | Score by quarters: 7-0, 5-1, 9-0, 1-1 | | | Khanty-Mansiysk, Russia |

=== 7th-place match ===
All times are YEKT (UTC+5)

| 17 August 2014; 15:00 | Singapore | 6–11 | South Africa | Khanty-Mansiysk, Russia |
| 17 August 2014; 15:00 | Score by quarters: 0-3, 3-2, 0-5, 3-1 | | | Khanty-Mansiysk, Russia |

=== 5th-place match ===
All times are YEKT (UTC+5)

| 17 August 2014; 16:30 | Hungary | 14–11 | Russia | Khanty-Mansiysk, Russia |
| 17 August 2014; 16:30 | Score by quarters: 4-4, 5-4, 3-1, 3-1 | | | Khanty-Mansiysk, Russia |

Championship bracket

Quarter-finals
15 August
China | 8
Hungary | 6
15 August
Singapore | 0
United States | 24
15 August
Russia | 8
Australia | 10
15 August
Spain | 12
South Africa | 2

Semi-finals
16 August
China | 4
United States | 11
16 August
Australia | 8
Spain | 2

Final
17 August
United States | 10
Australia | 6
Third place
17 August
China | 5
Spain | 7

=== Quarterfinals ===
All times are YEKT (UTC+5)

| 15 August 2014; 15:00 | China | 8–6 | Hungary | Khanty-Mansiysk, Russia |
| 15 August 2014; 15:00 | Score by quarters: 2-1, 3-2, 2–1, 1-2 | | | Khanty-Mansiysk, Russia |

| 15 August 2014; 16:30 | Spain | 12–2 | South Africa | Khanty-Mansiysk, Russia |
| 15 August 2014; 16:30 | Score by quarters: 2-0, 3-0, 3-0, 4-2 | | | Khanty-Mansiysk, Russia |

| 15 August 2014; 18:00 | Singapore | 0–24 | United States | Khanty-Mansiysk, Russia |
| 15 August 2014; 18:00 | Score by quarters: 0-8, 0-7, 0-5, 0-4 | | | Khanty-Mansiysk, Russia |

| 15 August 2014; 19:30 | Russia | 8–10 | Australia | Khanty-Mansiysk, Russia |
| 15 August 2014; 19:30 | Score by quarters: 2-2, 2-3, 2-3, 2-2 | | | Khanty-Mansiysk, Russia |

=== Semifinals ===
All times are YEKT (UTC+5)

| 16 August 2014; 18:00 | China | 4–11 | United States | Khanty-Mansiysk, Russia |
| 16 August 2014; 18:00 | Score by quarters: 0-4, 0-3, 3-2, 1-2 | | | Khanty-Mansiysk, Russia |

| 16 August 2014; 19:30 | Australia | 8–2 | Spain | Khanty-Mansiysk, Russia |
| 16 August 2014; 19:30 | Score by quarters: 2-1, 1-0, 3-1, 2-0 | | | Khanty-Mansiysk, Russia |

=== Bronze-medal match ===
All times are YEKT (UTC+5)

| 17 August 2014; 18:00 | China | 5–7 | Spain | Khanty-Mansiysk, Russia |
| 17 August 2014; 18:00 | Score by quarters: 1-2, 1-2, 2-1, 1-2 | | | Khanty-Mansiysk, Russia |
| 17 August 2014; 18:00 | Yating, Donglun, Zihan, Xinyan, Guannan 1 | Goals | A. Espar 4 M. Ortiz 2 Tarragó 1 | Khanty-Mansiysk, Russia |

=== Gold-medal match ===
All times are YEKT (UTC+5)

| 17 August 2014; 19:30 | United States | 10–6 | Australia | Khanty-Mansiysk, Russia |
| 17 August 2014; 19:30 | Score by quarters: 3-1, 4-2, 3-2, 0-1 | | | Khanty-Mansiysk, Russia |
| 17 August 2014; 19:30 | Seidemann 3 Matheewson, Neushul 2 Fattal, Clark, Steffens 1 | Goals | Webster, McGhie 2 Knox, Gofers 1 | Khanty-Mansiysk, Russia |

== Final standings ==
| RANK | TEAM |
|---|---|
| | United States |
| | Australia |
| | Spain |
| 4. | China |
| 5. | Hungary |
| 6. | Russia |
| 7. | South Africa |
| 8. | Singapore |

2014 Women's FINA Water Polo World Cup

United States
Third title

Team Roster

Sami Hill, Alys Williams, Melissa Seidemann, Rachel Fattal, Caroline Clark, Maggie Steffens, Courtney Mathewson, Kiley Neushul, Jillian Kraus, Kaleigh Gilchrist, Annika Dries, Kami Craig, Ashleigh Johnson. Head coach: Adam Krikorian.

== Individual awards ==
- Most Valuable Player
  - Rowena Webster (AUS)
- Best Goalkeeper
  - Ashleigh Johnson (USA)
- Best Scorer
  - Rita Keszthelyi (HUN) — 22 goals
- Media All Star Team
  - Ashleigh Johnson (USA) – Goalkeeper
  - Kami Craig (USA) – Centre forward
  - Rita Keszthelyi (HUN)
  - Ekaterina Prokofyeva (RUS)
  - Sun Yujun (CHN)
  - Roser Tarragó (ESP)
  - Rowena Webster (AUS)
