= Laura Ester =

Spanish water polo player (born 1990)

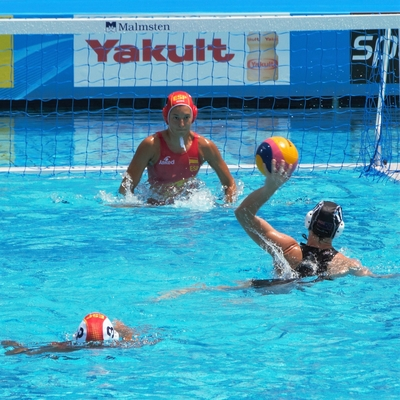
- Ester in 2013

Personal information
- Full name: Laura Ester Ramos
- Nationality: Spanish
- Born: 22 January 1990 (age 36) Barcelona, Spain
- Height: 1.70 m (5 ft 7 in)
- Weight: 58 kg (128 lb)

Sport
- Sport: Water polo
- Position: Goalkeeper
- Current club: CN Sabadell
Medal record
Women's water polo
Representing Spain
Olympic Games
Gold medal – first place	2024 Paris	Team
Silver medal – second place	2012 London	Team
Silver medal – second place	2020 Tokyo	Team
World Championships
Gold medal – first place	2013 Barcelona	Team
Silver medal – second place	2017 Budapest	Team
Silver medal – second place	2019 Gwangju	Team
Silver medal – second place	2023 Fukuoka	Team
Bronze medal – third place	2024 Doha	Team
European Championships
Gold medal – first place	2014 Budapest
Gold medal – first place	2020 Budapest
Gold medal – first place	2022 Split
Silver medal – second place	2008 Malaga
Silver medal – second place	2024 Eindhoven
Bronze medal – third place	2018 Barcelona
World Cup
Bronze medal – third place	2023 Long Beach

Laura Ester Ramos (Note: In this Spanish name, the first or paternal surname is Ester and the second or maternal family name is Ramos.) (born 22 January 1990) is a Spanish water polo goalkeeper. At the 2012 Summer Olympics, she competed for the Spain women's national water polo team in the women's event, winning the silver medal. She also competed at the 2016 Summer Olympics. She is 5 ft 7 inches tall.

== Notes ==
Awards
Preceded by (Italy) Roberta Bianconi	LEN European Water Polo Player of the Year; 2017	Succeeded by (Netherlands) Sabrina van der Sloot
Preceded by (Netherlands) Sabrina van der Sloot	LEN European Water Polo Player of the Year; 2019	Succeeded by Incumbent
