= Pili Peña =

Spanish water polo player (born 1986)

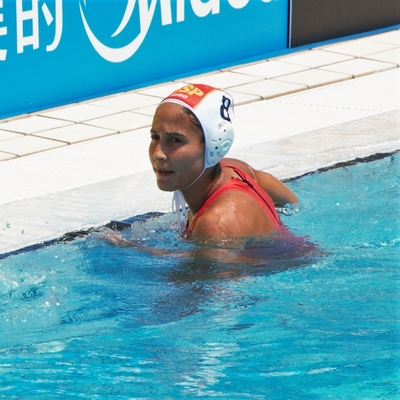
- Peña in 2013

Personal information
- Full name: María del Pilar Peña Carrasco
- Nationality: Spanish
- Born: 4 April 1986 (age 40) Madrid, Spain
- Height: 174 cm (69 in)
- Weight: 61 kg (134 lb)

Sport
- Sport: Water polo
- Handedness: Left
- Position: Wing
National team
- Years: Team
- 2006–: Spain
Medal record
Women's water polo
Representing Spain
Olympic Games
Gold medal – first place	2024 Paris	Team
Silver medal – second place	2012 London	Team
Silver medal – second place	2020 Tokyo	Team
World Championships
Gold medal – first place	2013 Barcelona	Team
Silver medal – second place	2017 Budapest	Team
Silver medal – second place	2019 Gwangju	Team
Silver medal – second place	2023 Fukuoka	Team
Bronze medal – third place	2024 Doha	Team
European Championships
Gold medal – first place	2014 Budapest
Gold medal – first place	2020 Budapest
Gold medal – first place	2022 Split
Silver medal – second place	2008 Malaga
Silver medal – second place	2024 Eindhoven
Bronze medal – third place	2018 Barcelona
World Cup
Bronze medal – third place	2023 Long Beach

María del Pilar Peña Carrasco (born 4 April 1986), commonly known as Pili Peña, is a Spanish water polo player.

== Early life and career ==
She was born in Madrid, and played for Club Natación Ondarreta Alcorcón, who won the Spanish championship in 2006, and the Spanish cup in 2006 and 2007. At the 2012 Summer Olympics, she won a silver medal competing for the Spain women's national water polo team in the women's event. She is 5 ft 7.5 inches tall. She now plays for the Spanish club CN Sabadell, with whom she won the Spanish championship in 2011, 2012, and 2013.

== See also ==
- List of Olympic medalists in water polo (women)
- List of World Aquatics Championships medalists in water polo
