= Judith Forca =

Spanish water polo player (born 1996)

Personal information
- Full name: Judith Forca Ariza
- Nationality: Spanish
- Born: 7 June 1996 (age 30) Sabadell, Spain
- Height: 1.73 m (5 ft 8 in)
- Weight: 66 kg (146 lb)

Sport
- Sport: Water polo
Medal record
Olympic Games
| Gold medal – first place | 2024 Paris | Team |
| Silver medal – second place | 2020 Tokyo | Team |
World Championships
| Silver medal – second place | 2017 Budapest | Team |
| Silver medal – second place | 2019 Gwangju | Team |
| Silver medal – second place | 2023 Fukuoka | Team |
| Bronze medal – third place | 2024 Doha | Team |
European Championships
| Gold medal – first place | 2020 Budapest |
| Gold medal – first place | 2022 Split |
| Silver medal – second place | 2024 Eindhoven |
World Cup
| Bronze medal – third place | 2023 Long Beach |

Judith Forca Ariza (born 7 June 1996) is a Spanish water polo player who won the silver medal at the 2017 World Championships in Budapest and at the 2019 World Championships in Gwangju.

== See also ==
- List of World Aquatics Championships medalists in water polo
