= Anni Espar =

Spanish water polo player (born 1993)

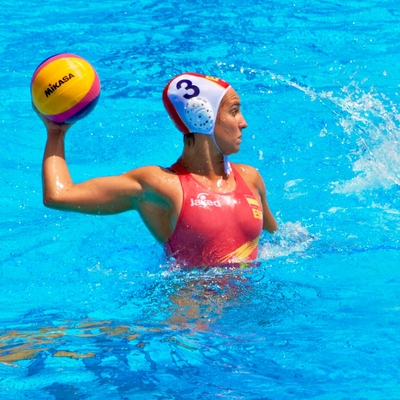
- Espar in 2013

Personal information
- Full name: Anna Espar Llaquet
- Born: 8 January 1993 (age 33) Barcelona, Spain
- Height: 1.80 m (5 ft 11 in)
- Weight: 67 kg (148 lb)

Sport
- Sport: Water polo
- Handedness: R
- Position: Driver
- Current club: CN Mataró
- Number: 3
National team
- Years: Team
- 2010–: Spain
Medal record
Women's water polo
Representing Spain
Event	1st	2nd	3rd
Olympic Games	1	2	0
World Championships	1	3	2
European Championships	3	1	1
Total	5	6	3
Olympic Games
Gold medal – first place	2024 Paris	Team
Silver medal – second place	2012 London	Team
Silver medal – second place	2020 Tokyo	Team
World Championships
Gold medal – first place	2013 Barcelona	Team
Silver medal – second place	2017 Budapest	Team
Silver medal – second place	2019 Gwangju	Team
Silver medal – second place	2023 Fukuoka	Team
Bronze medal – third place	2024 Doha	Team
Bronze medal – third place	2025 Singapore	Team
European Championships
Gold medal – first place	2014 Budapest	
Gold medal – first place	2020 Budapest	
Gold medal – first place	2022 Split	
Silver medal – second place	2024 Eindhoven	
Bronze medal – third place	2018 Barcelona	

Anna "Anni" Espar Llaquet (born 8 January 1993) is a Spanish water polo player who won the gold medal at the 2013 World Championships in Barcelona. She also won the silver medal at the 2012 and 2020 Summer Olympics.

== College career ==
Espar joined the University of Southern California women's water polo team in 2012. As a Freshman she was named to the ACWPC All-America First Team, All-MPSF First Team, MPSF All-Newcomer Team and MPSF Player of the Week on 25 February after scoring 8 goals in her first major tournament as a Trojan.

In 2013, she won the NCAA in the longest match in championship game history. Espar scored the winning goal in the third sudden-death overtime period.

== International career ==
Espar played on the Spain national team which won the silver medal at the 2012 Summer Olympics in London. She scored 15 goals and was named to the Olympic All-Star Team.

In 2012 Espar was named Best European Female Water Polo Player by the LEN.

Espar joined the Sydney Uni Lions women's water polo team in 2017 winning the Australian League and ending with an unprecedented undefeated season for the Lions (23 wins and a draw in 24 matches). Espar was also named to the 2017 NWPL All Star Team.

Espar also played on the Spanish national team which won the silver at the 2020 Summer Olympics in Tokyo. She scored again 15 goals and was named to the Olympic All-Star Team for the second time in her career.

== Personal life ==
Espar's younger sister, Clara, is also a professional water polo player.

== International competitions ==
- (gold) 2011 FINA Junior World Championships, Trieste, Italy, 1st place.
- (silver) 2012 Olympic Games, London, United Kingdom, 2nd place.
- (gold) 2013 FINA World Championships, Barcelona, Spain, 1st place.
- (silver) 2013 FINA Junior World Championships, Volos, Greece, 2nd place.
- (gold) 2014 European Championship, Budapest, Hungary. 1st place.
- (bronze) 2014 FINA World Cup, Khanty-Mansiysk, Russia, 3rd place.
- (silver) 2016 FINA World League, Shanghai, China, 2nd place.
- (silver) 2017 FINA World Championships, Budapest, Hungary, 2nd place.
- (bronze) 2018 LEN Europa Cup, Pontevedra, Spain, 3rd place.
- (gold) 2018 Mediterranean Games, Tarragona, Spain, 1st place.
- (bronze) 2018 European Championship, Barcelona, Spain, 3rd place.
- (silver) 2019 FINA World Championships, Gwangju, South Korea, 2nd place.
- (gold) 2020 European Championship, Budapest, Hungary. 1st place.
- (silver) 2020 Olympic Games, Tokyo, Japan, 2nd place.
- (gold) 2024 Olympic Games, Paris, France, 1st place.

== See also ==
- List of women's Olympic water polo tournament top goalscorers

Awards
Preceded by (Greece) Alexandra Asimaki	LEN European Water Polo Player of the Year; 2012	Succeeded by (Spain) Jennifer Pareja
