= Water polo at the 2020 Summer Olympics – Women's tournament =

Women's water polo at the Games of the XXXII Olympiad

Tournament details
- Host country: Japan
- City: Tokyo
- Venue(s): Tokyo Tatsumi International Swimming Center
- Dates: 24 July – 7 August 2021
- Teams: 10 (from 5 confederations)
- Competitors: 130

Final positions
- Champions: United States (3rd title)
- Runners-up: Spain
- Third place: Hungary
- Fourth place: ROC

Tournament statistics
- Matches: 32
- Goals scored: 748 (23.38 per match)
- Total attendance: 0 (0 per match)
- Multiple medalists: 3-time medalist(s): 2 players
- Top scorer(s): (Netherlands) Simone van de Kraats (28 goals in 7 matches)
- Most saves: (United States) Ashleigh Johnson (80 saves in 7 matches)
- Top sprinter(s): (Hungary) Vanda Vályi (27 sprints won in 7 matches)
- MVP: (United States) Maddie Musselman

The women's tournament of water polo at the 2020 Summer Olympics at Tokyo, Japan was played from 24 July to 7 August 2021 at the Tokyo Tatsumi International Swimming Center. It was the sixth appearance of the women's tournament, which had been held consecutively since 2000 and also was the first time on history that the tournament had 10 teams competing.

On 24 March 2020, the Olympics were postponed to 2021 due to the COVID-19 pandemic. Because of the pandemic, the games were played behind closed doors.

The United States won their third consecutive and overall gold medal after a finals win over Spain, while Hungary captured the bronze medal, beating defending bronze medalists Russia.

The medals for the competition were presented by Samira Asghari, Afghanistan; IOC Member, and the medalists' bouquets were presented by Dale Neuburger, United States; FINA Treasurer.

== Qualification ==
Event	Dates	Hosts	Quota	Qualifier(s)
Host nation	—N/a	—N/a	1	Japan
2019 FINA World League	4–9 June 2019	Hungary	1	United States
2019 FINA World Championships	14–26 July 2019	(South Korea) Gwangju	1	Spain
2019 Pan American Games	4–10 August 2019	(Peru) Lima	1	Canada
Oceanian Continental Selection	—N/a	—N/a	1	Australia
African Continental Selection	—N/a	—N/a	1	South Africa
2020 European Championships	12–25 January 2020	(Hungary) Budapest	1	ROC
2018 Asian Games	16–21 August 2018	(Indonesia) Jakarta	1	China
World Qualification Tournament	19–24 January 2021	(Italy) Trieste	2	Hungary
World Qualification Tournament	19–24 January 2021	(Italy) Trieste	2	Netherlands
Total			10	

== Schedule ==
The competition began on 24 July, and matches were held every other day. At each match time, two matches were played simultaneously (two during the preliminary round, two quarterfinals during that round, one main semifinal and one classification semifinal during the semifinal round, and the two classification games on the final day) except for the bronze and gold medal matches.

Legend
G	Group stage	¼	Quarter-finals	½	Semi-finals	B	Bronze medal match	F	Gold medal match

Sat 24	Sun 25	Mon 26	Tue 27	Wed 28	Thu 29	Fri 30	Sat 31	Sun 1	Mon 2	Tue 3	Wed 4	Thu 5	Fri 6	Sat 7	
G		G		G		G		G		¼		½		B	F

== Competition format ==
The ten teams were seeded into two groups for a preliminary round and each group was played in a round-robin. The top four teams in each group advanced to the knockout round while the fifth placed teams and those ranked 9th and 10th based on win–loss record then goal average were eliminated. The knockout round began with quarterfinals, with the winners advanced to the semifinals, while the quarterfinal losers play in the fifth to eighth place classification semifinals. The two semifinal winners play in the gold medal match, while the two semifinal losers play in the bronze medal match.

== Draw ==
The draw took place on 21 February 2021 in Rotterdam, The Netherlands.

=== Seeding ===
The ten teams in the women's tournament were drawn into two groups of five teams. The teams were seeded into five pots.

Pot 1	Pot 2	Pot 3	Pot 4	Pot 5
United States; Spain	ROC; Australia	Hungary; Netherlands	Canada; China	South Africa; Japan (hosts)

=== Final draw ===
The hosts Japan and the reigning Olympic champion the United States were both drawn into Group B.

	Group A	Group B
1	Australia	ROC
2	South Africa	China
3	Netherlands	Hungary
4	Spain	United States
5	Canada	Japan

== Referees ==
The following 28 referees were selected for the tournament.

24 referees:

- (Argentina) Germán Moller
- (Australia) Nicola Johnson
- (Canada) Marie-Claude Deslières
- (China) Zhang Liang
- (Croatia) Nenad Periš
- (France) Sébastien Dervieux
- (Germany) Frank Ohme
- (Greece) Georgios Stavridis
- (Hungary) György Kun
- (Italy) Alessandro Severo
- (Japan) Asumi Tsuzaki
- (Kazakhstan) Viktor Salnichenko
- (Montenegro) Stanko Ivanovski
- (Netherlands) Michiel Zwart
- (New Zealand) John Waldow
- (Romania) Adrian Alexandrescu
- (Russia) Arkadiy Voevodin
- (Serbia) Vojin Putniković
- (Singapore) Jeremy Cheng
- (South Africa) Dion Willis
- (Spain) Xevi Buch
- (Switzerland) Ursula Wengenroth
- (United States) Michael Goldenberg
- (Uruguay) Daniel Daners

4 video assistant referees:

- (Croatia) Mladen Rak
- (Kazakhstan) Alexandr Margolin
- (Kazakhstan) Alexandr Shershnev
- (Spain) Jaume Teixido

== Group stage ==
The schedule was announced on 9 March 2021.

All times are local (UTC+9).

=== Group A ===
Pos	Team	Pld	W	D	L	GF	GA	GD	Pts	Qualification
1	Spain	4	3	0	1	71	37	+34	6 (Note: Spain 2 Pts, +5 GD; Netherlands 2 Pts, −2 GD; Australia 2 Pts, −3 GD. Spain first and after that the head-to head results between Australia and Netherlands (15–12) came into effect.)	Quarterfinals
2	Australia	4	3	0	1	46	33	+13	6	Quarterfinals
3	Netherlands	4	3	0	1	75	41	+34	6	Quarterfinals
4	Canada	4	1	0	3	48	39	+9	2	Quarterfinals
5	South Africa	4	0	0	4	7	97	−90	0	

Source: Tokyo 2020 and FINA
Rules for classification: 1) Points; 2) Head-to-head points; 3) Head-to-head goal difference; 4) Head-to-head goals scored; 5) Goal difference.
Notes:

24 July 2021; 15:30 v	Report	Canada	5–8	Australia	Tokyo Tatsumi International Swimming Center; Referees: Michael Goldenberg (USA), György Kun (HUN)
24 July 2021; 15:30 v	Report	Score by quarters: 1–1, 2–4, 1–2, 1–1			Tokyo Tatsumi International Swimming Center; Referees: Michael Goldenberg (USA), György Kun (HUN)
24 July 2021; 15:30 v	Report	Eggens 3	Goals	Halligan 3	Tokyo Tatsumi International Swimming Center; Referees: Michael Goldenberg (USA), György Kun (HUN)

24 July 2021; 18:20 v	Report	South Africa	4–29	Spain	Tokyo Tatsumi International Swimming Center; Referees: Asumi Tsuzaki (JPN), Ursula Wengenroth (SUI)
24 July 2021; 18:20 v	Report	Score by quarters: 2–5, 1–9, 1–5, 0–10			Tokyo Tatsumi International Swimming Center; Referees: Asumi Tsuzaki (JPN), Ursula Wengenroth (SUI)
24 July 2021; 18:20 v	Report	Wedderburn 2	Goals	Ruiz 5	Tokyo Tatsumi International Swimming Center; Referees: Asumi Tsuzaki (JPN), Ursula Wengenroth (SUI)

26 July 2021; 18:20 v	Report	Australia	15–12	Netherlands	Tokyo Tatsumi International Swimming Center; Referees: Adrian Alexandrescu (ROU), Arkadii Voevodin (RUS)
26 July 2021; 18:20 v	Report	Score by quarters: 3–3, 2–5, 5–2, 5–2			Tokyo Tatsumi International Swimming Center; Referees: Adrian Alexandrescu (ROU), Arkadii Voevodin (RUS)
26 July 2021; 18:20 v	Report	three players 3	Goals	four players 2	Tokyo Tatsumi International Swimming Center; Referees: Adrian Alexandrescu (ROU), Arkadii Voevodin (RUS)

26 July 2021; 19:50 v	Report	Spain	14–10	Canada	Tokyo Tatsumi International Swimming Center; Referees: Georgios Stavridis (GRE), Nenad Periš (CRO)
26 July 2021; 19:50 v	Report	Score by quarters: 4–2, 2–2, 3–2, 5–3			Tokyo Tatsumi International Swimming Center; Referees: Georgios Stavridis (GRE), Nenad Periš (CRO)
26 July 2021; 19:50 v	Report	Ortiz 4	Goals	Lemay-Lavoie 3	Tokyo Tatsumi International Swimming Center; Referees: Georgios Stavridis (GRE), Nenad Periš (CRO)

28 July 2021; 15:30 v	Report	Canada	21–1	South Africa	Tokyo Tatsumi International Swimming Center; Referees: Asumi Tsuzaki (JPN), John Waldow (NZL)
28 July 2021; 15:30 v	Report	Score by quarters: 5–1, 4–0, 4–0, 8–0			Tokyo Tatsumi International Swimming Center; Referees: Asumi Tsuzaki (JPN), John Waldow (NZL)
28 July 2021; 15:30 v	Report	Sohi 4	Goals	Moir 1	Tokyo Tatsumi International Swimming Center; Referees: Asumi Tsuzaki (JPN), John Waldow (NZL)

28 July 2021; 19:50 v	Report	Netherlands	14–13	Spain	Tokyo Tatsumi International Swimming Center; Referees: Sébastien Dervieux (FRA), Michael Goldenberg (USA)
28 July 2021; 19:50 v	Report	Score by quarters: 2–3, 3–2, 3–2, 6–6			Tokyo Tatsumi International Swimming Center; Referees: Sébastien Dervieux (FRA), Michael Goldenberg (USA)
28 July 2021; 19:50 v	Report	Van de Kraats 6	Goals	A. Espar 4	Tokyo Tatsumi International Swimming Center; Referees: Sébastien Dervieux (FRA), Michael Goldenberg (USA)

30 July 2021; 14:00 v	Report	South Africa	1–33	Netherlands	Tokyo Tatsumi International Swimming Center; Referees: Nicola Johnson (AUS), Ursula Wengenroth (SUI)
30 July 2021; 14:00 v	Report	Score by quarters: 0–7, 0–9, 1–9, 0–8			Tokyo Tatsumi International Swimming Center; Referees: Nicola Johnson (AUS), Ursula Wengenroth (SUI)
30 July 2021; 14:00 v	Report	Wedderburn 1	Goals	Keuning 6	Tokyo Tatsumi International Swimming Center; Referees: Nicola Johnson (AUS), Ursula Wengenroth (SUI)

30 July 2021; 19:50 v	Report	Spain	15–9	Australia	Tokyo Tatsumi International Swimming Center; Referees: Sébastien Dervieux (FRA), Arkadii Voevodin (RUS)
30 July 2021; 19:50 v	Report	Score by quarters: 3–3, 4–3, 4–1, 4–2			Tokyo Tatsumi International Swimming Center; Referees: Sébastien Dervieux (FRA), Arkadii Voevodin (RUS)
30 July 2021; 19:50 v	Report	Ortiz 5	Goals	Kearns, Webster 2	Tokyo Tatsumi International Swimming Center; Referees: Sébastien Dervieux (FRA), Arkadii Voevodin (RUS)

1 August 2021; 15:30 v	Report	Netherlands	16–12	Canada	Tokyo Tatsumi International Swimming Center; Referees: Alessandro Severo (ITA), Nenad Periš (CRO)
1 August 2021; 15:30 v	Report	Score by quarters: 4–4, 4–3, 3–2, 5–3			Tokyo Tatsumi International Swimming Center; Referees: Alessandro Severo (ITA), Nenad Periš (CRO)
1 August 2021; 15:30 v	Report	Van de Kraats 6	Goals	Christmas 4	Tokyo Tatsumi International Swimming Center; Referees: Alessandro Severo (ITA), Nenad Periš (CRO)

1 August 2021; 19:50 v	Report	Australia	14–1	South Africa	Tokyo Tatsumi International Swimming Center; Referees: Daniel Daners (URU), Jeremy Cheng (SGP)
1 August 2021; 19:50 v	Report	Score by quarters: 1–0, 6–1, 4–0, 3–0			Tokyo Tatsumi International Swimming Center; Referees: Daniel Daners (URU), Jeremy Cheng (SGP)
1 August 2021; 19:50 v	Report	five players 2	Goals	Vaughan 1	Tokyo Tatsumi International Swimming Center; Referees: Daniel Daners (URU), Jeremy Cheng (SGP)

=== Group B ===
Pos	Team	Pld	W	D	L	GF	GA	GD	Pts	Qualification
1	United States	4	3	0	1	64	26	+38	6	Quarterfinals
2	Hungary	4	2	1	1	46	43	+3	5 (Note: ROC10–10 Hungary)	Quarterfinals
3	ROC	4	2	1	1	53	61	−8	5	Quarterfinals
4	China	4	2	0	2	51	50	+1	4	Quarterfinals
5	Japan (H)	4	0	0	4	44	78	−34	0	

Source: Tokyo 2020 and FINA
Rules for classification: 1) Points; 2) Head-to-head points; 3) Head-to-head goal difference; 4) Head-to-head goals scored; 5) Goal difference.
(H) Hosts
Notes:

24 July 2021; 14:00 v	Report	Japan	4–25	United States	Tokyo Tatsumi International Swimming Center; Referees: Germán Moller (ARG), Nicola Johnson (AUS)
24 July 2021; 14:00 v	Report	Score by quarters: 3–8, 0–6, 1–7, 0–4			Tokyo Tatsumi International Swimming Center; Referees: Germán Moller (ARG), Nicola Johnson (AUS)
24 July 2021; 14:00 v	Report	Koide 2	Goals	Haralabidis, Steffens 5	Tokyo Tatsumi International Swimming Center; Referees: Germán Moller (ARG), Nicola Johnson (AUS)

24 July 2021; 19:50 v	Report	China	17–18	ROC	Tokyo Tatsumi International Swimming Center; Referees: Marie-Claude Deslières (CAN), Michiel Zwart (NED)
24 July 2021; 19:50 v	Report	Score by quarters: 6–5, 4–4, 4–5, 3–4			Tokyo Tatsumi International Swimming Center; Referees: Marie-Claude Deslières (CAN), Michiel Zwart (NED)
24 July 2021; 19:50 v	Report	Wang X. 4	Goals	Prokofyeva 4	Tokyo Tatsumi International Swimming Center; Referees: Marie-Claude Deslières (CAN), Michiel Zwart (NED)

26 July 2021; 14:00 v	Report	United States	12–7	China	Tokyo Tatsumi International Swimming Center; Referees: Alessandro Severo (ITA), Dion Willis (RSA)
26 July 2021; 14:00 v	Report	Score by quarters: 4–4, 2–2, 3–0, 3–1			Tokyo Tatsumi International Swimming Center; Referees: Alessandro Severo (ITA), Dion Willis (RSA)
26 July 2021; 14:00 v	Report	M. Fischer 3	Goals	Wang, Zhang J. 2	Tokyo Tatsumi International Swimming Center; Referees: Alessandro Severo (ITA), Dion Willis (RSA)

26 July 2021; 15:30 v	Report	ROC	10–10	Hungary	Tokyo Tatsumi International Swimming Center; Referees: Sébastien Dervieux (FRA), Xevi Buch (ESP)
26 July 2021; 15:30 v	Report	Score by quarters: 1–2, 3–5, 3–1, 3–2			Tokyo Tatsumi International Swimming Center; Referees: Sébastien Dervieux (FRA), Xevi Buch (ESP)
26 July 2021; 15:30 v	Report	Prokofyeva 4	Goals	Leimeter, Szilágyi 2	Tokyo Tatsumi International Swimming Center; Referees: Sébastien Dervieux (FRA), Xevi Buch (ESP)

28 July 2021; 14:00 v	Report	Hungary	10–9	United States	Tokyo Tatsumi International Swimming Center; Referees: Nenad Periš (CRO), Xevi Buch (ESP)
28 July 2021; 14:00 v	Report	Score by quarters: 2–2, 3–3, 1–3, 4–1			Tokyo Tatsumi International Swimming Center; Referees: Nenad Periš (CRO), Xevi Buch (ESP)
28 July 2021; 14:00 v	Report	Parkes 3	Goals	Musselman 3	Tokyo Tatsumi International Swimming Center; Referees: Nenad Periš (CRO), Xevi Buch (ESP)

28 July 2021; 18:20 v	Report	China	16–11	Japan	Tokyo Tatsumi International Swimming Center; Referees: Marie-Claude Deslières (CAN), Viktor Salnichenko (KAZ)
28 July 2021; 18:20 v	Report	Score by quarters: 5–2, 4–3, 4–3, 3–3			Tokyo Tatsumi International Swimming Center; Referees: Marie-Claude Deslières (CAN), Viktor Salnichenko (KAZ)
28 July 2021; 18:20 v	Report	Zhang 5	Goals	Arima 3	Tokyo Tatsumi International Swimming Center; Referees: Marie-Claude Deslières (CAN), Viktor Salnichenko (KAZ)

30 July 2021; 15:30 v	Report	United States	18–5	ROC	Tokyo Tatsumi International Swimming Center; Referees: Alessandro Severo (ITA), Xevi Buch (ESP)
30 July 2021; 15:30 v	Report	Score by quarters: 5–1, 4–2, 6–1, 3–1			Tokyo Tatsumi International Swimming Center; Referees: Alessandro Severo (ITA), Xevi Buch (ESP)
30 July 2021; 15:30 v	Report	Haralabidis, Steffens 4	Goals	Simanovich 2	Tokyo Tatsumi International Swimming Center; Referees: Alessandro Severo (ITA), Xevi Buch (ESP)

30 July 2021; 18:20 v	Report	Japan	13–17	Hungary	Tokyo Tatsumi International Swimming Center; Referees: Adrian Alexandrescu (ROU), Vojin Putniković (SRB)
30 July 2021; 18:20 v	Report	Score by quarters: 4–3, 3–4, 3–5, 3–5			Tokyo Tatsumi International Swimming Center; Referees: Adrian Alexandrescu (ROU), Vojin Putniković (SRB)
30 July 2021; 18:20 v	Report	Arima, Inaba 4	Goals	Parkes 6	Tokyo Tatsumi International Swimming Center; Referees: Adrian Alexandrescu (ROU), Vojin Putniković (SRB)

1 August 2021; 14:00 v	Report	Hungary	9–11	China	Tokyo Tatsumi International Swimming Center; Referees: Viktor Salnichenko (KAZ), Frank Ohme (GER)
1 August 2021; 14:00 v	Report	Score by quarters: 1–4, 1–3, 2–1, 5–3			Tokyo Tatsumi International Swimming Center; Referees: Viktor Salnichenko (KAZ), Frank Ohme (GER)
1 August 2021; 14:00 v	Report	Gurisatti 4	Goals	four players 2	Tokyo Tatsumi International Swimming Center; Referees: Viktor Salnichenko (KAZ), Frank Ohme (GER)

1 August 2021; 18:20 v	Report	ROC	20–16	Japan	Tokyo Tatsumi International Swimming Center; Referees: Marie-Claude Deslières (CAN), Dion Willis (RSA)
1 August 2021; 18:20 v	Report	Score by quarters: 5–5, 7–3, 6–4, 2–4			Tokyo Tatsumi International Swimming Center; Referees: Marie-Claude Deslières (CAN), Dion Willis (RSA)
1 August 2021; 18:20 v	Report	Serzhantova 4	Goals	Arima 5	Tokyo Tatsumi International Swimming Center; Referees: Marie-Claude Deslières (CAN), Dion Willis (RSA)

== Knockout stage ==
=== Bracket ===
Quarter-finals
3 August
Spain	11
China	7
3 August
Netherlands	11
Hungary	14
3 August
Australia	8
ROC	9
3 August
Canada	5
United States	16

Semi-finals
5 August
Spain	8
Hungary	6
5 August
ROC	11
United States	15

Gold medal
7 August
Spain	5
United States	14
Bronze medal
7 August
Hungary	11
ROC	9

5th place bracket

5–8th place semifinals
5 August
China	6
Netherlands	13
5 August
Australia (pen.)	10 (4)
Canada	10 (2)

Fifth place
7 August
Netherlands	7
Australia	14
Seventh place
7 August
China	7
Canada	16

=== Quarterfinals ===
3 August 2021; 14:00 v	Report	Canada	5–16	United States	Tokyo Tatsumi International Swimming Center; Referees: Asumi Tsuzaki (JPN), Georgios Stavridis (GRE)
3 August 2021; 14:00 v	Report	Score by quarters: 1–7, 2–4, 0–0, 2–5			Tokyo Tatsumi International Swimming Center; Referees: Asumi Tsuzaki (JPN), Georgios Stavridis (GRE)
3 August 2021; 14:00 v	Report	La Roche 2	Goals	three players 3	Tokyo Tatsumi International Swimming Center; Referees: Asumi Tsuzaki (JPN), Georgios Stavridis (GRE)

3 August 2021; 15:30 v	Report	Spain	11–7	China	Tokyo Tatsumi International Swimming Center; Referees: Sébastien Dervieux (FRA), Michael Goldenberg (USA)
3 August 2021; 15:30 v	Report	Score by quarters: 5–2, 4–3, 2–1, 0–1			Tokyo Tatsumi International Swimming Center; Referees: Sébastien Dervieux (FRA), Michael Goldenberg (USA)
3 August 2021; 15:30 v	Report	Forca 4	Goals	Deng 2	Tokyo Tatsumi International Swimming Center; Referees: Sébastien Dervieux (FRA), Michael Goldenberg (USA)

3 August 2021; 18:20 v	Report	Netherlands	11–14	Hungary	Tokyo Tatsumi International Swimming Center; Referees: Nenad Periš (CRO), Alessandro Severo (ITA)
3 August 2021; 18:20 v	Report	Score by quarters: 3–4, 4–4, 2–2, 2–4			Tokyo Tatsumi International Swimming Center; Referees: Nenad Periš (CRO), Alessandro Severo (ITA)
3 August 2021; 18:20 v	Report	Van der Kraats 4	Goals	Leimeter 4	Tokyo Tatsumi International Swimming Center; Referees: Nenad Periš (CRO), Alessandro Severo (ITA)

3 August 2021; 19:50 v	Report	Australia	8–9	ROC	Tokyo Tatsumi International Swimming Center; Referees: Adrian Alexandrescu (ROU), Xevi Buch (ESP)
3 August 2021; 19:50 v	Report	Score by quarters: 2–4, 2–2, 2–2, 2–1			Tokyo Tatsumi International Swimming Center; Referees: Adrian Alexandrescu (ROU), Xevi Buch (ESP)
3 August 2021; 19:50 v	Report	Armit, Halligan 2	Goals	three players 2	Tokyo Tatsumi International Swimming Center; Referees: Adrian Alexandrescu (ROU), Xevi Buch (ESP)

=== 5–8th place semifinals ===
5 August 2021; 14:00 v	Report	China	6–13	Netherlands	Tokyo Tatsumi International Swimming Center; Referees: Viktor Salnichenko (KAZ), György Kun (HUN)
5 August 2021; 14:00 v	Report	Score by quarters: 0–1, 2–5, 1–2, 3–5			Tokyo Tatsumi International Swimming Center; Referees: Viktor Salnichenko (KAZ), György Kun (HUN)
5 August 2021; 14:00 v	Report	Deng 2	Goals	Keuning 5	Tokyo Tatsumi International Swimming Center; Referees: Viktor Salnichenko (KAZ), György Kun (HUN)

5 August 2021; 18:20 v	Report	Australia	14–12 (PSO)	Canada	Tokyo Tatsumi International Swimming Center; Referees: Ursula Wengenroth (SUI), Alessandro Severo (ITA)
5 August 2021; 18:20 v	Report	Score by quarters: 2–3, 3–2, 3–3, 2–2 PSO: 4–2			Tokyo Tatsumi International Swimming Center; Referees: Ursula Wengenroth (SUI), Alessandro Severo (ITA)
5 August 2021; 18:20 v	Report	Arancini 5	Goals	four players 2	Tokyo Tatsumi International Swimming Center; Referees: Ursula Wengenroth (SUI), Alessandro Severo (ITA)

=== Semifinals ===
5 August 2021; 15:30 v	Report	ROC	11–15	United States	Tokyo Tatsumi International Swimming Center; Referees: Stanko Ivanovski (MNE), Dion Willis (RSA)
5 August 2021; 15:30 v	Report	Score by quarters: 3–2, 4–4, 2–5, 2–4			Tokyo Tatsumi International Swimming Center; Referees: Stanko Ivanovski (MNE), Dion Willis (RSA)
5 August 2021; 15:30 v	Report	Bersneva 3	Goals	Musselman 5	Tokyo Tatsumi International Swimming Center; Referees: Stanko Ivanovski (MNE), Dion Willis (RSA)

5 August 2021; 19:50 v	Report	Spain	8–6	Hungary	Tokyo Tatsumi International Swimming Center; Referees: Nenad Periš (CRO), Vojin Putniković (SRB)
5 August 2021; 19:50 v	Report	Score by quarters: 2–0, 3–2, 3–2, 0–2			Tokyo Tatsumi International Swimming Center; Referees: Nenad Periš (CRO), Vojin Putniković (SRB)
5 August 2021; 19:50 v	Report	A. Espar 3	Goals	Szilágyi 3	Tokyo Tatsumi International Swimming Center; Referees: Nenad Periš (CRO), Vojin Putniković (SRB)

=== Seventh place game ===
7 August 2021; 09:30 v	Report	China	7–16	Canada	Tokyo Tatsumi International Swimming Center; Referees: Nicola Johnson (AUS), Asumi Tsuzaki (JPN)
7 August 2021; 09:30 v	Report	Score by quarters: 3–4, 2–5, 1–4, 1–3			Tokyo Tatsumi International Swimming Center; Referees: Nicola Johnson (AUS), Asumi Tsuzaki (JPN)
7 August 2021; 09:30 v	Report	Zhang J. 4	Goals	Christmas 4	Tokyo Tatsumi International Swimming Center; Referees: Nicola Johnson (AUS), Asumi Tsuzaki (JPN)

=== Fifth place game ===
7 August 2021; 11:00 v	Report	Netherlands	7–14	Australia	Tokyo Tatsumi International Swimming Center; Referees: Xevi Buch (ESP), Dion Willis (RSA)
7 August 2021; 11:00 v	Report	Score by quarters: 1–5, 1–3, 2–3, 3–3			Tokyo Tatsumi International Swimming Center; Referees: Xevi Buch (ESP), Dion Willis (RSA)
7 August 2021; 11:00 v	Report	Van de Kraats 3	Goals	Gofers 3	Tokyo Tatsumi International Swimming Center; Referees: Xevi Buch (ESP), Dion Willis (RSA)

=== Bronze medal game ===
7 August 2021; 13:40 v	Report	Hungary	11–9	ROC	Tokyo Tatsumi International Swimming Center; Referees: Georgios Stavridis (GRE), Frank Ohme (GER)
7 August 2021; 13:40 v	Report	Score by quarters: 2–2, 5–3, 0–3, 4–1			Tokyo Tatsumi International Swimming Center; Referees: Georgios Stavridis (GRE), Frank Ohme (GER)
7 August 2021; 13:40 v	Report	Vályi 3	Goals	three players 2	Tokyo Tatsumi International Swimming Center; Referees: Georgios Stavridis (GRE), Frank Ohme (GER)

=== Gold medal game ===
7 August 2021; 16:30 v	Report	Spain	5–14	United States	Tokyo Tatsumi International Swimming Center; Referees: Nenad Periš (CRO), Sébastien Dervieux (FRA)
7 August 2021; 16:30 v	Report	Score by quarters: 1–4, 3–3, 0–5, 1–2			Tokyo Tatsumi International Swimming Center; Referees: Nenad Periš (CRO), Sébastien Dervieux (FRA)
7 August 2021; 16:30 v	Report	García 2	Goals	Musselman 3	Tokyo Tatsumi International Swimming Center; Referees: Nenad Periš (CRO), Sébastien Dervieux (FRA)

== Final ranking ==
Rank	Team
Gold medal	United States
Silver medal	Spain
Bronze medal	Hungary
4	ROC
5	Australia
6	Netherlands
7	Canada
8	China
9	Japan
10	South Africa

2020 Women's Olympic champions

United States
Third title

== Medalists ==
Gold	Silver	Bronze
United States Ashleigh Johnson (GK); Maddie Musselman; Melissa Seidemann; Rachel Fattal; Paige Hauschild; Maggie Steffens (C); Stephania Haralabidis (LH); Jamie Neushul; Aria Fischer; Kaleigh Gilchrist; Makenzie Fischer; Alys Williams; Amanda Longan (GK) Head coach: Adam Krikorian	Spain Laura Ester (GK); Marta Bach; Anni Espar; Beatriz Ortiz; Elena Ruiz; Irene González; Clara Espar; Pili Peña (C, LH); Judith Forca (LH); Roser Tarragó; Maica García; Paula Leitón; Elena Sánchez (GK) Head coach: Miki Oca	Hungary Edina Gangl (GK); Dorottya Szilágyi; Vanda Vályi; Gréta Gurisatti; Gabriella Szűcs; Rebecca Parkes; Anna Illés; Rita Keszthelyi (C); Dóra Leimeter (LH); Anikó Gyöngyössy; Nataša Rybanská; Krisztina Garda; Alda Magyari (GK) Head coach: Attila Bíró

== Team statistics ==
=== Goals for ===
Rank	Team	Goals for	Matches played	Goals for per match	Shots	%	Finish
1	United States	109	7	15.571	234	46.6%	1st
2	Netherlands	106	7	15.143	211	50.2%	6th
3	Spain	95	7	13.571	250	38.0%	2nd
4	ROC	82	7	11.714	211	38.9%	4th
5	Canada	79	7	11.286	228	34.6%	7th
6	Australia	78	7	11.143	210	37.1%	5th
7	Hungary	77	7	11.000	204	37.7%	3rd
7	Japan	44	4	11.000	128	34.4%	9th
9	China	71	7	10.143	196	36.2%	8th
10	South Africa	7	4	1.750	68	10.3%	10th
Total		748	32	11.688	1940	38.6%	

Source: Official Results Book (page 224)

=== Goals against ===
Rank	Team	Goals against	Matches played	Goals against per match	Shots	%	Finish
1	United States	47	7	6.714	208	22.6%	1st
2	Australia	59	7	8.429	177	33.3%	5th
3	Spain	64	7	9.143	183	35.0%	2nd
4	Hungary	71	7	10.143	217	32.7%	3rd
5	Canada	72	7	10.286	198	36.4%	7th
6	Netherlands	75	7	10.714	207	36.2%	6th
7	China	90	7	12.857	220	40.9%	8th
8	ROC	95	7	13.571	231	41.1%	4th
9	Japan	78	4	19.500	128	60.9%	9th
10	South Africa	97	4	24.250	171	56.7%	10th
Total		748	32	11.688	1940	38.6%	

Source: Official Results Book (pages 239, 243, 247, 251, 255, 258, 262, 266, 269, 273)

=== Goal difference ===
Rank	Team	Goals for	Goals against	Goal diff.	Matches played	Goals diff. per match	Finish
1	United States	109	47	62	7	8.857	1st
2	Netherlands	106	75	31	7	4.429	6th
2	Spain	95	64	31	7	4.429	2nd
4	Australia	78	59	19	7	2.714	5th
5	Canada	79	72	7	7	1.000	7th
6	Hungary	77	71	6	7	0.857	3rd
7	ROC	82	95	−13	7	−1.857	4th
8	China	71	90	−19	7	−2.714	8th
9	Japan	44	78	−34	4	−8.500	9th
10	South Africa	7	97	−90	4	−22.500	10th
Total		748	748	0	32	0.000	

Source: Official Results Book (pages 239, 243, 247, 251, 255, 258, 262, 266, 269, 273)

=== Saves ===
Rank	Team	Saves	Matches played	Saves per match	Shots	%	Finish
1	United States	84	7	12.000	131	64.1%	1st
2	South Africa	44	4	11.000	141	31.2%	10th
3	Netherlands	64	7	9.143	139	46.0%	6th
4	China	60	7	8.571	150	40.0%	8th
5	ROC	59	7	8.429	154	38.3%	4th
6	Australia	58	7	8.286	117	49.6%	5th
7	Hungary	54	7	7.714	125	43.2%	3rd
8	Canada	52	7	7.429	124	41.9%	7th
9	Japan	27	4	6.750	105	25.7%	9th
10	Spain	46	7	6.571	110	41.8%	2nd
Total		548	32	8.563	1296	42.3%	

Source: Official Results Book (pages 239, 243, 247, 251, 255, 258, 262, 266, 269, 273)

=== Blocks ===
Rank	Team	Blocks	Matches played	Blocks per match	Finish
1	Spain	34	7	4.857	2nd
2	Hungary	33	7	4.714	3rd
3	Canada	31	7	4.429	7th
4	United States	30	7	4.286	1st
5	Netherlands	28	7	4.000	6th
6	Australia	27	7	3.857	5th
7	China	25	7	3.571	8th
7	ROC	25	7	3.571	4th
9	South Africa	6	4	1.500	10th
10	Japan	0	4	0.000	9th
Total		239	32	3.734	

Source: Official Results Book (page 224)

=== Rebounds ===
Rank	Team	Rebounds	Matches played	Rebounds per match	Finish
1	United States	52	7	7.429	1st
2	Hungary	47	7	6.714	3rd
3	Spain	43	7	6.143	2nd
4	Australia	41	7	5.857	5th
5	ROC	39	7	5.571	4th
6	Netherlands	32	7	4.571	6th
7	South Africa	18	4	4.500	10th
8	Canada	30	7	4.286	7th
9	China	24	7	3.429	8th
10	Japan	9	4	2.250	9th
Total		335	32	5.234	

Source: Official Results Book (page 224)

=== Steals ===
Rank	Team	Steals	Matches played	Steals per match	Finish
1	Australia	63	7	9.000	5th
2	Japan	31	4	7.750	9th
3	Netherlands	51	7	7.286	6th
3	Spain	51	7	7.286	2nd
5	Canada	50	7	7.143	7th
6	United States	48	7	6.857	1st
7	ROC	42	7	6.000	4th
8	Hungary	39	7	5.571	3rd
9	China	30	7	4.286	8th
10	South Africa	13	4	3.250	10th
Total		418	32	6.531	

Source: Official Results Book (page 224)

=== Sprints won ===
Rank	Team	Sprints won	Matches played	Sprints won per match	Sprints contested	%	Finish
1	Hungary	27	7	3.857	28	96.4%	3rd
2	Netherlands	19	7	2.714	28	67.9%	6th
3	United States	18	7	2.571	28	64.3%	1st
4	Spain	16	7	2.286	28	57.1%	2nd
5	Canada	12	7	1.714	28	42.9%	7th
5	ROC	12	7	1.714	28	42.9%	4th
7	Australia	11	7	1.571	28	39.3%	5th
8	China	7	7	1.000	28	25.0%	8th
8	South Africa	4	4	1.000	16	25.0%	10th
10	Japan	2	4	0.500	16	12.5%	9th
Total		128	32	2.000	256	50.0%	

Source: Official Results Book (page 224)

=== Turnovers ===
Rank	Team	Turnovers	Matches played	Turnovers per match	Finish
1	Spain	31	7	4.429	2nd
2	Canada	34	7	4.857	7th
2	China	34	7	4.857	8th
2	United States	34	7	4.857	1st
5	Japan	22	4	5.500	9th
6	ROC	39	7	5.571	4th
7	Australia	40	7	5.714	5th
7	Netherlands	40	7	5.714	6th
9	Hungary	41	7	5.857	3rd
10	South Africa	34	4	8.500	10th
Total		349	32	5.453	

Source: Official Results Book (page 224)

=== Exclusions with substitution ===
Rank	Team	Exclusions with substitution	Matches played	Exclusions w/subst per match	Finish
1	Japan	1	4	0.250	9th
2	Canada	2	7	0.286	7th
3	United States	3	7	0.429	1st
4	Netherlands	4	7	0.571	6th
4	Spain	4	7	0.571	2nd
6	Australia	5	7	0.714	5th
7	South Africa	3	4	0.750	10th
8	Hungary	6	7	0.857	3rd
9	ROC	9	7	1.286	4th
10	China	12	7	1.714	8th
Total		49	32	0.766	

Source: Official Results Book (page 224)

== Player statistics ==
=== Multiple medalists ===
Three-time Olympic medalist(s): 2 players

- United States: Melissa Seidemann, Maggie Steffens

=== Leading goalscorers ===
Rank	Player	Team	Goals	Matches played	Goals per match	Shots	%
1	Simone van de Kraats	Netherlands	28	7	4.000	44	63.6%
2	Maddie Musselman	United States	18	7	2.571	49	36.7%
2	Beatriz Ortiz	Spain	18	7	2.571	46	39.1%
2	Maggie Steffens	United States	18	7	2.571	32	56.3%
5	Maud Megens	Netherlands	17	7	2.429	37	45.9%
6	Zhang Jing	China	16	7	2.286	26	61.5%
7	Kyra Christmas	Canada	15	7	2.143	29	51.7%
7	Anni Espar	Spain	15	7	2.143	34	44.1%
7	Ekaterina Prokofyeva	ROC	15	7	2.143	35	42.9%
10	Makenzie Fischer	United States	14	7	2.000	33	42.4%
10	Judith Forca	Spain	14	7	2.000	37	37.8%

Source: Official Results Book (page 234)

=== Saves leaders ===
Rank	Goalkeeper	Team	Saves	Matches played	Saves per match	Shots	%
1	Ashleigh Johnson	United States	80	7	11.429	124	64.5%
2	Alda Magyari	Hungary	51	7	7.286	116	44.0%
3	Shen Yineng	China	47	6	7.833	112	42.0%
4	Laura Ester	Spain	45	7	6.429	108	41.7%
5	Meghan Maartens	South Africa	44	4	11.000	141	31.2%
6	Anna Karnaukh	ROC	42	5	8.400	98	42.9%
7	Claire Wright	Canada	37	5	7.400	92	40.2%
8	Joanne Koenders	Netherlands	33	3	11.000	48	68.8%
9	Debby Willemsz	Netherlands	31	5	6.200	90	34.4%
10	Lea Yanitsas	Australia	30	3	10.000	60	50.0%

Source: Official Results Book (page 236)

=== Leading blockers ===
Rank	Player	Team	Blocks	Matches played	Blocks per match
1	Rita Keszthelyi	Hungary	10	7	1.429
2	Beatriz Ortiz	Spain	9	7	1.286
2	Zhang Jing	China	9	7	1.286
4	Ekaterina Prokofyeva	ROC	8	7	1.143
5	Rachel Fattal	United States	7	7	1.000
5	Shae La Roche	Canada	7	7	1.000
7	Bronte Halligan	Australia	6	7	0.857
7	Maggie Steffens	United States	6	7	0.857
9	Aria Fischer	United States	5	7	0.714
9	Keesja Gofers	Australia	5	7	0.714
9	Paula Leitón	Spain	5	7	0.714
9	Rebecca Parkes	Hungary	5	7	0.714
9	Dorottya Szilágyi	Hungary	5	7	0.714
9	Roser Tarragó	Spain	5	7	0.714

Source: Official Results Book (pages 239, 243, 247, 251, 255, 258, 262, 266, 269, 273)

=== Leading rebounders ===
Rank	Player	Team	Rebounds	Matches played	Rebounds per match
1	Anni Espar	Spain	12	7	1.714
2	Rachel Fattal	United States	10	7	1.429
3	Maddie Musselman	United States	9	7	1.286
4	Makenzie Fischer	United States	8	7	1.143
4	Keesja Gofers	Australia	8	7	1.143
4	Ekaterina Prokofyeva	ROC	8	7	1.143
4	Maggie Steffens	United States	8	7	1.143
8	Evgeniya Soboleva	ROC	7	7	1.000
8	Dorottya Szilágyi	Hungary	7	7	1.000
8	Rowena Webster	Australia	7	7	1.000
8	Zhang Jing	China	7	7	1.000

Source: Official Results Book (pages 239, 243, 247, 251, 255, 258, 262, 266, 269, 273)

=== Steals leaders ===
Rank	Player	Team	Steals	Matches played	Steals per match
1	Simone van de Kraats	Netherlands	13	7	1.857
2	Anni Espar	Spain	11	7	1.571
2	Bronte Halligan	Australia	11	7	1.571
4	Hannah Buckling	Australia	10	7	1.429
4	Ekaterina Prokofyeva	ROC	10	7	1.429
6	Zoe Arancini	Australia	8	7	1.143
6	Ashleigh Johnson (GK)	United States	8	7	1.143
6	Bronwen Knox	Australia	8	7	1.143
6	Sabrina van der Sloot	Netherlands	8	7	1.143
6	Dorottya Szilágyi	Hungary	8	7	1.143

Source: Official Results Book (pages 239, 243, 247, 251, 255, 258, 262, 266, 269, 273)

=== Leading sprinters ===
Rank	Sprinter	Team	Sprints won	Matches played	Sprints won per match	Sprints contested	%
1	Vanda Vályi	Hungary	27	7	3.857	28	96.4%
2	Rachel Fattal	United States	18	7	2.571	26	69.2%
3	Anni Espar	Spain	13	7	1.857	23	56.5%
4	Maria Bersneva	ROC	11	7	1.571	21	52.4%
5	Sabrina van der Sloot	Netherlands	10	7	1.429	13	76.9%
6	Kyra Christmas	Canada	9	7	1.286	18	50.0%
7	Simone van de Kraats	Netherlands	8	7	1.143	13	61.5%
8	Amy Ridge	Australia	6	7	0.857	8	75.0%
9	Keesja Gofers	Australia	4	7	0.571	17	23.5%
9	Amica Hallenndorff	South Africa	4	4	1.000	11	36.4%
9	Wang Xinyan	China	4	7	0.571	11	36.4%

Source: Official Results Book (page 233)

=== Turnovers leaders ===
Rank	Player	Team	Turnovers	Matches played	Turnovers per match
1	Elyse Lemay-Lavoie	Canada	15	7	2.143
1	Rebecca Parkes	Hungary	15	7	2.143
3	Paula Leitón	Spain	12	7	1.714
3	Anna Timofeeva	ROC	12	7	1.714
5	Maica García	Spain	11	7	1.571
6	Chen Xiao	China	10	7	1.429
6	Aria Fischer	United States	10	7	1.429
6	Anikó Gyöngyössy	Hungary	10	6	1.667
6	Xiong Dunhan	China	10	7	1.429
10	Anastasia Simanovich	ROC	8	7	1.143

Source: Official Results Book (pages 239, 243, 247, 251, 255, 258, 262, 266, 269, 273)

=== Exclusions leaders ===
Rank	Player	Team	Exclusions with substitution	Matches played	Exclusions w/subst per match
1	Mei Xiaohan	China	5	7	0.714
2	Hannah Buckling	Australia	3	7	0.429
2	Veronika Vakhitova	ROC	3	7	0.429
2	Wang Xinyan	China	3	7	0.429
5	Evgeniya Ivanova	ROC	2	7	0.286
5	Georgie Moir	South Africa	2	4	0.500
5	Beatriz Ortiz	Spain	2	7	0.286
5	Vivian Sevenich	Netherlands	2	7	0.286
5	Vanda Vályi	Hungary	2	7	0.286

Source: Official Results Book (pages 239, 243, 247, 251, 255, 258, 262, 266, 269, 273)

== Awards ==
The women's all-star team was announced on 7 August 2021.

Position	Player
Goalkeeper	(United States) Ashleigh Johnson
Field players	(Hungary) Rebecca Parkes (Centre forward)
Field players	(Spain) Anni Espar
Field players	(United States) Maddie Musselman
Field players	(Spain) Beatriz Ortiz
Field players	(Russia) Ekaterina Prokofyeva
Field players	(Netherlands) Simone van de Kraats
MVP	(United States) Maddie Musselman

== Sources ==
=== Overall ===
- Water Polo – Olympic Schedule & Results | Tokyo 2020 Olympics
- Water Polo – Olympic Reports | Tokyo 2020 Olympics
- Water Polo – Official Results Book | Tokyo 2020 Olympics (archive)
- Water Polo – Tournament Summary | Tokyo 2020 Olympics
- Water Polo – Competition Officials | Tokyo 2020 Olympics

=== Tournament details ===
- Water Polo – Competition Schedule | Tokyo 2020 Olympics

Group A
24 July 2021				26 July 2021			
Match 01: CAN v AUS	Start List	Play by Play	Results	Match 07: ESP v CAN	Start List	Play by Play	Results
Match 02: RSA v ESP	Start List	Play by Play	Results	Match 08: AUS v NED	Start List	Play by Play	Results
28 July 2021				30 July 2021			
Match 09: CAN v RSA	Start List	Play by Play	Results	Match 13: RSA v NED	Start List	Play by Play	Results
Match 10: NED v ESP	Start List	Play by Play	Results	Match 14: ESP v AUS	Start List	Play by Play	Results
1 August 2021							
Match 19: NED v CAN	Start List	Play by Play	Results				
Match 20: AUS v RSA	Start List	Play by Play	Results				

Group B
24 July 2021				26 July 2021			
Match 03: CHN v ROC	Start List	Play by Play	Results	Match 05: ROC v HUN	Start List	Play by Play	Results
Match 04: JPN v USA	Start List	Play by Play	Results	Match 06: USA v CHN	Start List	Play by Play	Results
28 July 2021				30 July 2021			
Match 11: HUN v USA	Start List	Play by Play	Results	Match 15: JPN v HUN	Start List	Play by Play	Results
Match 12: CHN v JPN	Start List	Play by Play	Results	Match 16: USA v ROC	Start List	Play by Play	Results
1 August 2021							
Match 17: HUN v CHN	Start List	Play by Play	Results				
Match 18: ROC v JPN	Start List	Play by Play	Results				

Knockout stage
3 August 2021				5 August 2021			
Match 21: ESP v CHN	Start List	Play by Play	Results	Match 25: CHN v NED	Start List	Play by Play	Results
Match 22: AUS v ROC	Start List	Play by Play	Results	Match 26: AUS v CAN	Start List	Play by Play	Results
Match 23: NED v HUN	Start List	Play by Play	Results	Match 27: ESP v HUN	Start List	Play by Play	Results
Match 24: CAN v USA	Start List	Play by Play	Results	Match 28: ROC v USA	Start List	Play by Play	Results
7 August 2021							
Match 29: CHN v CAN	Start List	Play by Play	Results				
Match 30: NED v AUS	Start List	Play by Play	Results				
Match 31: HUN v ROC	Start List	Play by Play	Results				
Match 32: ESP v USA	Start List	Play by Play	Results				

=== Statistics ===
- Water Polo – Overall Team Statistics | Tokyo 2020 Olympics
- Water Polo – Team Statistics | Tokyo 2020 Olympics
- Water Polo – Individual Statistics | Tokyo 2020 Olympics
- Water Polo – Individual Statistics - Leading Scorers | Tokyo 2020 Olympics
- Water Polo – Goalkeeper Statistics | Tokyo 2020 Olympics
- Water Polo – Cumulative Statistics | Tokyo 2020 Olympics
  - Australia, Canada, China, Hungary, Japan, Netherlands, ROC, South Africa, Spain, United States

=== Medallists and victory ceremony presenters ===
- Water Polo – Medallists | Tokyo 2020 Olympics
- Water Polo – Victory Ceremony Presenters | Tokyo 2020 Olympics
