= Water polo at the 2020 Summer Olympics =

Water polo at the Games of the XXXII Olympiad
- Water polo pictogram

Tournament details
- Host country: Japan
- City: Tokyo
- Venue(s): Tokyo Tatsumi International Swimming Center
- Dates: 24 July – 8 August 2021
- Events: 2 (men's, women's)
- Teams: 12 (men's), 10 (women's) (from 5 confederations)
- Competitors: 286

Final positions
- Champions: Serbia (men); United States (women)
- Runners-up: Greece (men); Spain (women)
- Third place: Hungary (men); Hungary (women)
- Fourth place: Spain (men); ROC (women)

Tournament statistics (men, women)
- Matches: 74
- Goals scored: 1,650 (22.3 per match)
- Multiple medalists: 4-time medalist(s): 3 players 3-time medalist(s): 6 players
- MVPs: (Serbia) Filip Filipović (men's) (United States) Maddie Musselman (women's)

The water polo tournaments at the 2020 Summer Olympics took place at the Tokyo Tatsumi International Swimming Center in Kōtō. Twenty-two teams (twelve for men and ten for women) competed in the tournament, an increase of two from the previous editions. Men's Water polo was also the last final played before the closing ceremony.

It was originally scheduled to be held in 2020, but on 24 March 2020, the Olympics were postponed to 2021 due to the COVID-19 pandemic.

== Schedule ==
The match schedule as of 9 March 2021.

Legend
G	Group stage	¼	Quarter-finals	½	Semi-finals	B	Bronze medal match	F	Gold medal match

Date Event	Sat 24	Sun 25	Mon 26	Tue 27	Wed 28	Thu 29	Fri 30	Sat 31	Sun 1	Mon 2	Tue 3	Wed 4	Thu 5	Fri 6	Sat 7		Sun 8	
Men		G		G		G		G		G		¼		½			B	F
Women	G		G		G		G		G		¼		½		B	F		

== Qualification ==
=== Qualification summary ===
Nation	Men's	Women's	Athletes
Australia	Yes	Yes	26
Canada		Yes	13
China		Yes	13
Croatia	Yes		13
Greece	Yes		13
Hungary	Yes	Yes	26
Italy	Yes		13
Japan	Yes	Yes	26
Kazakhstan	Yes		13
Montenegro	Yes		13
Netherlands		Yes	13
ROC		Yes	13
South Africa	Yes	Yes	26
Serbia	Yes		13
Spain	Yes	Yes	26
United States	Yes	Yes	26
Total: 16 NOCs	12	10	286

=== Men's qualification ===
Event	Dates	Hosts	Quota	Qualifier(s)
Host nation	—N/a	—N/a	1	Japan
2019 FINA World League	18–23 June 2019	(Serbia) Belgrade	1	Serbia
2019 FINA World Championships	15–27 July 2019	(South Korea) Gwangju	2	Italy
2019 FINA World Championships	15–27 July 2019	(South Korea) Gwangju	2	Spain
2019 Pan American Games	4–10 August 2019	(Peru) Lima	1	United States
Oceanian Continental Selection	—N/a	—N/a	1	Australia
African Continental Selection	—N/a	—N/a	1	South Africa
2020 European Championships	14–26 January 2020	(Hungary) Budapest	1	Hungary
2018 Asian Games	25 August – 1 September 2018	(Indonesia) Jakarta	1	Kazakhstan
World Qualification Tournament	14–21 February 2021	(Netherlands) Rotterdam	3	Croatia
World Qualification Tournament	14–21 February 2021	(Netherlands) Rotterdam	3	Greece
World Qualification Tournament	14–21 February 2021	(Netherlands) Rotterdam	3	Montenegro
Total			12	

=== Women's qualification ===
Event	Dates	Hosts	Quota	Qualifier(s)
Host nation	—N/a	—N/a	1	Japan
2019 FINA World League	4–9 June 2019	Hungary	1	United States
2019 FINA World Championships	14–26 July 2019	(South Korea) Gwangju	1	Spain
2019 Pan American Games	4–10 August 2019	(Peru) Lima	1	Canada
Oceanian Continental Selection	—N/a	—N/a	1	Australia
African Continental Selection	—N/a	—N/a	1	South Africa
2020 European Championships	12–25 January 2020	(Hungary) Budapest	1	ROC
2018 Asian Games	16–21 August 2018	(Indonesia) Jakarta	1	China
World Qualification Tournament	19–24 January 2021	(Italy) Trieste	2	Hungary
World Qualification Tournament	19–24 January 2021	(Italy) Trieste	2	Netherlands
Total			10	

== Medal summary ==
=== Medal table ===
Rank	NOC	Gold	Silver	Bronze	Total
1	Serbia	1	0	0	1
1	United States	1	0	0	1
3	Greece	0	1	0	1
3	Spain	0	1	0	1
5	Hungary	0	0	2	2
Totals (5 entries)		2	2	2	6

=== Medalists ===
Event	Gold	Silver	Bronze
Men	Serbia; Milan Aleksić; Nikola Dedović; Filip Filipović; Nikola Jakšić; Đorđe Lazić; Dušan Mandić; Branislav Mitrović; Stefan Mitrović; Duško Pijetlović; Gojko Pijetlović; Andrija Prlainović; Sava Ranđelović; Strahinja Rašović	Greece; Stylianos Argyropoulos; Georgios Dervisis; Ioannis Fountoulis; Konstantinos Galanidis; Konstantinos Genidounias; Konstantinos Gkiouvetsis; Marios Kapotsis; Christodoulos Kolomvos; Konstantinos Mourikis; Alexandros Papanastasiou; Dimitrios Skoumpakis; Angelos Vlachopoulos; Emmanouil Zerdevas	Hungary; Dániel Angyal; Balázs Erdélyi; Balázs Hárai; Norbert Hosnyánszky; Szilárd Jansik; Krisztián Manhercz; Tamás Mezei; Viktor Nagy; Mátyás Pásztor; Márton Vámos; Dénes Varga; Soma Vogel; Gergő Zalánki
Women	United States; Rachel Fattal; Aria Fischer; Makenzie Fischer; Kaleigh Gilchrist; Stephania Haralabidis; Paige Hauschild; Ashleigh Johnson; Amanda Longan; Maddie Musselman; Jamie Neushul; Melissa Seidemann; Maggie Steffens; Alys Williams	Spain; Marta Bach; Anni Espar; Clara Espar; Laura Ester; Judith Forca; Maica García; Irene González; Paula Leitón; Beatriz Ortiz; Pili Peña; Elena Ruiz; Elena Sánchez; Roser Tarragó	Hungary; Edina Gangl; Krisztina Garda; Gréta Gurisatti; Anikó Gyöngyössy; Anna Illés; Rita Keszthelyi; Dóra Leimeter; Alda Magyari; Rebecca Parkes; Nataša Rybanská; Dorottya Szilágyi; Gabriella Szűcs; Vanda Vályi

== Men's tournament ==
=== Preliminary round ===
==== Group A ====
Pos	Team	Pld	W	D	L	GF	GA	GD	Pts	Qualification
1	Greece	5	4	1	0	68	34	+34	9	Quarterfinals
2	Italy	5	3	2	0	60	32	+28	8	Quarterfinals
3	Hungary	5	3	1	1	64	35	+29	7	Quarterfinals
4	United States	5	2	0	3	59	53	+6	4	Quarterfinals
5	Japan (H)	5	1	0	4	65	66	−1	2	
6	South Africa	5	0	0	5	20	116	−96	0	

Source: Tokyo 2020 and FINA
Rules for classification: 1) Points; 2) Head-to-head points; 3) Head-to-head goal difference; 4) Head-to-head goals scored; 5) Goal difference.
(H) Hosts

==== Group B ====
Pos	Team	Pld	W	D	L	GF	GA	GD	Pts	Qualification
1	Spain	5	5	0	0	61	31	+30	10	Quarterfinals
2	Croatia	5	3	0	2	62	46	+16	6 (Note: Croatia 14–12 Serbia)	Quarterfinals
3	Serbia	5	3	0	2	70	46	+24	6	Quarterfinals
4	Montenegro	5	2	0	3	54	56	−2	4 (Note: Australia 10–15 Montenegro)	Quarterfinals
5	Australia	5	2	0	3	49	60	−11	4	
6	Kazakhstan	5	0	0	5	35	92	−57	0	

Source: Tokyo 2020 and FINA
Rules for classification: 1) Points; 2) Head-to-head points; 3) Head-to-head goal difference; 4) Head-to-head goals scored; 5) Goal difference.

=== Knockout stage ===
Quarter-finals
4 August
Greece	10
Montenegro	4
4 August
Croatia	11
Hungary	15
4 August
Italy	6
Serbia	10
4 August
Spain	12
United States	8

Semi-finals
6 August
Greece	9
Hungary	6
6 August
Serbia	10
Spain	9

Gold medal
8 August
Greece	10
Serbia	13
Bronze medal
8 August
Hungary	9
Spain	5

=== Final standings ===
Rank	Team
Gold medal	Serbia
Silver medal	Greece
Bronze medal	Hungary
4	Spain
5	Croatia
6	United States
7	Italy
8	Montenegro
9	Australia
10	Japan
11	Kazakhstan
12	South Africa

== Women's tournament ==
=== Preliminary round ===
==== Group A ====
Pos	Team	Pld	W	D	L	GF	GA	GD	Pts	Qualification
1	Spain	4	3	0	1	71	37	+34	6 (Note: Spain 2 Pts, +5 GD; Netherlands 2 Pts, −2 GD; Australia 2 Pts, −3 GD. Spain first and after that the head-to head results between Australia and Netherlands (15–12) came into effect.)	Quarterfinals
2	Australia	4	3	0	1	46	33	+13	6	Quarterfinals
3	Netherlands	4	3	0	1	75	41	+34	6	Quarterfinals
4	Canada	4	1	0	3	48	39	+9	2	Quarterfinals
5	South Africa	4	0	0	4	7	97	−90	0	

Source: Tokyo 2020 and FINA
Rules for classification: 1) Points; 2) Head-to-head points; 3) Head-to-head goal difference; 4) Head-to-head goals scored; 5) Goal difference.

==== Group B ====
Pos	Team	Pld	W	D	L	GF	GA	GD	Pts	Qualification
1	United States	4	3	0	1	64	26	+38	6	Quarterfinals
2	Hungary	4	2	1	1	46	43	+3	5 (Note: ROC10–10 Hungary)	Quarterfinals
3	ROC	4	2	1	1	53	61	−8	5	Quarterfinals
4	China	4	2	0	2	51	50	+1	4	Quarterfinals
5	Japan (H)	4	0	0	4	44	78	−34	0	

Source: Tokyo 2020 and FINA
Rules for classification: 1) Points; 2) Head-to-head points; 3) Head-to-head goal difference; 4) Head-to-head goals scored; 5) Goal difference.
(H) Hosts

=== Knockout stage ===
Quarter-finals
3 August
Spain	11
China	7
3 August
Netherlands	11
Hungary	14
3 August
Australia	8
ROC	9
3 August
Canada	5
United States	16

Semi-finals
5 August
Spain	8
Hungary	6
5 August
ROC	11
United States	15

Gold medal
7 August
Spain	5
United States	14
Bronze medal
7 August
Hungary	11
ROC	9

=== Final standings ===
Rank	Team
Gold medal	United States
Silver medal	Spain
Bronze medal	Hungary
4	ROC
5	Australia
6	Netherlands
7	Canada
8	China
9	Japan
10	South Africa

== Sources ==
- Water Polo – Olympic Schedule & Results | Tokyo 2020 Olympics
- Water Polo – Olympic Reports | Tokyo 2020 Olympics
- Water Polo – Official Results Book | Tokyo 2020 Olympics (archive)
- Water Polo – Medal Standings | Tokyo 2020 Olympics
- Water Polo – Medallists by Event | Tokyo 2020 Olympics
