= Water polo at the 2019 World Aquatics Championships – Women's tournament =

Tournament details
- Venue: 1 (in 1 host city)
- Dates: 14–26 July
- Teams: 16 (from 5 confederations)

Final positions
- Champions: United States (6th title)
- Runners-up: Spain
- Third place: Australia
- Fourth place: Hungary

Tournament statistics
- Matches played: 48
- Goals scored: 1,084 (22.58 per match)
- Top scorer(s): (Hungary) Rita Keszthelyi (24 goals)

Awards
- Best player: (Spain) Roser Tarragó

The women's water polo tournament at the 2019 World Aquatics Championships was held from 14 to 26 July.

The United States captured their sixth overall title after defeating Spain in the final, while Australia won against Hungary to win the bronze medal.

== Participating teams ==
Africa

- South Africa

Americas

- Canada
- Cuba
- United States

Asia

- China
- Japan
- Kazakhstan
- South Korea

Europe

- Greece
- Hungary
- Italy
- Netherlands
- Russia
- Spain

Oceania

- Australia
- New Zealand

== Draw ==
The draw was held on 7 April 2019.

=== Seeding ===
The seedings were announced on 6 February 2019.

Pot 1	Pot 2	Pot 3	Pot 4
United States; Russia; Spain; Australia	Netherlands; China; Greece; Canada	Cuba; Hungary; Italy; New Zealand	Kazakhstan; South Korea; Japan; South Africa

== Preliminary round ==
All times are local (UTC+9).

=== Group A ===
Pos	Team	Pld	W	D	L	GF	GA	GD	Pts	Qualification
1	United States	3	3	0	0	60	13	+47	6	Quarterfinals
2	Netherlands	3	2	0	1	57	18	+39	4	Playoffs
3	New Zealand	3	1	0	2	26	41	−15	2	Playoffs
4	South Africa	3	0	0	3	5	76	−71	0	

Source: Sportresult
Rules for classification: 1) points; 2) head-to-head points; 3) head-to-head goal difference; 4) head-to-head number of goals scored; 5) Goal difference.

14 July 2019; 08:30	Report	South Africa	0–33	Netherlands	Nambu University Aquatics Center, Gwangju; Referees: Viktor Salnichenko (KAZ), Ni Shi Wei (CHN)
14 July 2019; 08:30	Report	Score by quarters: 0–7, 0–10, 0–9, 0–7			Nambu University Aquatics Center, Gwangju; Referees: Viktor Salnichenko (KAZ), Ni Shi Wei (CHN)
14 July 2019; 08:30	Report		Goals	Van de Kraats 7	Nambu University Aquatics Center, Gwangju; Referees: Viktor Salnichenko (KAZ), Ni Shi Wei (CHN)

14 July 2019; 09:50	Report	New Zealand	3–22	United States	Nambu University Aquatics Center, Gwangju; Referees: Jaume Teixidó (ESP), Stanko Ivanovski (MNE)
14 July 2019; 09:50	Report	Score by quarters: 0–8, 1–4, 0–6, 2–4			Nambu University Aquatics Center, Gwangju; Referees: Jaume Teixidó (ESP), Stanko Ivanovski (MNE)
14 July 2019; 09:50	Report	Doyle 2	Goals	Haralabidis 5	Nambu University Aquatics Center, Gwangju; Referees: Jaume Teixidó (ESP), Stanko Ivanovski (MNE)

16 July 2019; 19:10	Report	United States	12–9	Netherlands	Nambu University Aquatics Center, Gwangju; Referees: Sebastien Dervieux (FRA), Vojin Putniković (SRB)
16 July 2019; 19:10	Report	Score by quarters: 3–2, 1–2, 4–3, 4–2			Nambu University Aquatics Center, Gwangju; Referees: Sebastien Dervieux (FRA), Vojin Putniković (SRB)
16 July 2019; 19:10	Report	Gilchrist, Musselman 3	Goals	Keuning 2	Nambu University Aquatics Center, Gwangju; Referees: Sebastien Dervieux (FRA), Vojin Putniković (SRB)

16 July 2019; 20:30	Report	South Africa	4–17	New Zealand	Nambu University Aquatics Center, Gwangju; Referees: Alessandro Severo (ITA), Daniel Flahive (AUS)
16 July 2019; 20:30	Report	Score by quarters: 0–6, 0–2, 2–6, 2–3			Nambu University Aquatics Center, Gwangju; Referees: Alessandro Severo (ITA), Daniel Flahive (AUS)
16 July 2019; 20:30	Report	Hallendorff 2	Goals	Doyle, McDowall 4	Nambu University Aquatics Center, Gwangju; Referees: Alessandro Severo (ITA), Daniel Flahive (AUS)

18 July 2019; 16:30	Report	South Africa	1–26	United States	Nambu University Aquatics Center, Gwangju; Referees: Alessandro Severo (ITA), An Jin-yong (KOR)
18 July 2019; 16:30	Report	Score by quarters: 0–7, 1–8, 0–6, 0–5			Nambu University Aquatics Center, Gwangju; Referees: Alessandro Severo (ITA), An Jin-yong (KOR)
18 July 2019; 16:30	Report	Meecham 1	Goals	Musselman 5	Nambu University Aquatics Center, Gwangju; Referees: Alessandro Severo (ITA), An Jin-yong (KOR)

18 July 2019; 17:50	Report	New Zealand	6–15	Netherlands	Nambu University Aquatics Center, Gwangju; Referees: Jaume Teixidó (ESP), Viktor Salnichenko (KAZ)
18 July 2019; 17:50	Report	Score by quarters: 0–2, 3–4, 1–4, 2–5			Nambu University Aquatics Center, Gwangju; Referees: Jaume Teixidó (ESP), Viktor Salnichenko (KAZ)
18 July 2019; 17:50	Report	McDowall 3	Goals	Megens 5	Nambu University Aquatics Center, Gwangju; Referees: Jaume Teixidó (ESP), Viktor Salnichenko (KAZ)

=== Group B ===
Pos	Team	Pld	W	D	L	GF	GA	GD	Pts	Qualification
1	Russia	3	3	0	0	65	23	+42	6	Quarterfinals
2	Hungary	3	2	0	1	91	31	+60	4	Playoffs
3	Canada	3	1	0	2	46	35	+11	2	Playoffs
4	South Korea (H)	3	0	0	3	3	116	−113	0	

Source: Sportresult
Rules for classification: 1) points; 2) head-to-head points; 3) head-to-head goal difference; 4) head-to-head number of goals scored; 5) Goal difference.
(H) Hosts

14 July 2019; 11:10	Report	Canada	10–18	Russia	Nambu University Aquatics Center, Gwangju; Referees: Alessandro Severo (ITA), Nenad Periš (CRO)
14 July 2019; 11:10	Report	Score by quarters: 1–2, 2–5, 4–5, 3–6			Nambu University Aquatics Center, Gwangju; Referees: Alessandro Severo (ITA), Nenad Periš (CRO)
14 July 2019; 11:10	Report	Christmas 3	Goals	Prokofyeva 3	Nambu University Aquatics Center, Gwangju; Referees: Alessandro Severo (ITA), Nenad Periš (CRO)

14 July 2019; 12:30	Report	Hungary	64–0	South Korea	Nambu University Aquatics Center, Gwangju; Referees: Jeremy Cheng (SGP), John Waldow (NZL)
14 July 2019; 12:30	Report	Score by quarters: 16–0, 18–0, 16–0, 14–0			Nambu University Aquatics Center, Gwangju; Referees: Jeremy Cheng (SGP), John Waldow (NZL)
14 July 2019; 12:30	Report	Parkes 11	Goals		Nambu University Aquatics Center, Gwangju; Referees: Jeremy Cheng (SGP), John Waldow (NZL)

16 July 2019; 08:30	Report	South Korea	1–30	Russia	Nambu University Aquatics Center, Gwangju; Referees: Jaume Teixidó (ESP), Dion Willis (RSA)
16 July 2019; 08:30	Report	Score by quarters: 0–7, 0–9, 0–8, 1–6			Nambu University Aquatics Center, Gwangju; Referees: Jaume Teixidó (ESP), Dion Willis (RSA)
16 July 2019; 08:30	Report	Kyung 1	Goals	ten players 3	Nambu University Aquatics Center, Gwangju; Referees: Jaume Teixidó (ESP), Dion Willis (RSA)

16 July 2019; 09:50	Report	Canada	14–15	Hungary	Nambu University Aquatics Center, Gwangju; Referees: Nenad Periš (CRO), Georgios Stavridis (GRE)
16 July 2019; 09:50	Report	Score by quarters: 2–3, 4–5, 3–5, 5–2			Nambu University Aquatics Center, Gwangju; Referees: Nenad Periš (CRO), Georgios Stavridis (GRE)
16 July 2019; 09:50	Report	Fournier, E. Wright 3	Goals	Keszthelyi 7	Nambu University Aquatics Center, Gwangju; Referees: Nenad Periš (CRO), Georgios Stavridis (GRE)

18 July 2019; 19:10	Report	Canada	22–2	South Korea	Nambu University Aquatics Center, Gwangju; Referees: Michiel Zwart (NED), Michael Goldenberg (USA)
18 July 2019; 19:10	Report	Score by quarters: 5–0, 6–0, 6–0, 5–2			Nambu University Aquatics Center, Gwangju; Referees: Michiel Zwart (NED), Michael Goldenberg (USA)
18 July 2019; 19:10	Report	Christmas, E. Wright 3	Goals	Kyung, Lee J. 1	Nambu University Aquatics Center, Gwangju; Referees: Michiel Zwart (NED), Michael Goldenberg (USA)

18 July 2019; 20:30	Report	Hungary	12–17	Russia	Nambu University Aquatics Center, Gwangju; Referees: Vojin Putniković (SRB), Georgios Stavridis (GRE)
18 July 2019; 20:30	Report	Score by quarters: 4–6, 3–5, 1–2, 4–4			Nambu University Aquatics Center, Gwangju; Referees: Vojin Putniković (SRB), Georgios Stavridis (GRE)
18 July 2019; 20:30	Report	Vályi 4	Goals	Bersneva 4	Nambu University Aquatics Center, Gwangju; Referees: Vojin Putniković (SRB), Georgios Stavridis (GRE)

=== Group C ===
Pos	Team	Pld	W	D	L	GF	GA	GD	Pts	Qualification
1	Spain	3	3	0	0	51	16	+35	6	Quarterfinals
2	Greece	3	2	0	1	37	25	+12	4	Playoffs
3	Kazakhstan	3	1	0	2	22	37	−15	2	Playoffs
4	Cuba	3	0	0	3	16	48	−32	0	

Source: Sportresult
Rules for classification: 1) points; 2) head-to-head points; 3) head-to-head goal difference; 4) head-to-head number of goals scored; 5) Goal difference.

14 July 2019; 16:30	Report	Cuba	6–9	Kazakhstan	Nambu University Aquatics Center, Gwangju; Referees: Adrian Alexandrescu (ROU), Dion Willis (RSA)
14 July 2019; 16:30	Report	Score by quarters: 0–1, 3–1, 2–4, 1–3			Nambu University Aquatics Center, Gwangju; Referees: Adrian Alexandrescu (ROU), Dion Willis (RSA)
14 July 2019; 16:30	Report	Chávez 2	Goals	Myrzabekova 3	Nambu University Aquatics Center, Gwangju; Referees: Adrian Alexandrescu (ROU), Dion Willis (RSA)

14 July 2019; 17:50	Report	Greece	4–14	Spain	Nambu University Aquatics Center, Gwangju; Referees: Boris Margeta (SLO), Michiel Zwart (NED)
14 July 2019; 17:50	Report	Score by quarters: 1–6, 2–2, 0–3, 1–3			Nambu University Aquatics Center, Gwangju; Referees: Boris Margeta (SLO), Michiel Zwart (NED)
14 July 2019; 17:50	Report	four players 1	Goals	Tarragó 6	Nambu University Aquatics Center, Gwangju; Referees: Boris Margeta (SLO), Michiel Zwart (NED)

16 July 2019; 11:10	Report	Spain	18–6	Kazakhstan	Nambu University Aquatics Center, Gwangju; Referees: Germán Moller (ARG), Michiel Zwart (NED)
16 July 2019; 11:10	Report	Score by quarters: 3–1, 7–3, 3–1, 5–1			Nambu University Aquatics Center, Gwangju; Referees: Germán Moller (ARG), Michiel Zwart (NED)
16 July 2019; 11:10	Report	three players 3	Goals	Mirshina, Yeremina 2	Nambu University Aquatics Center, Gwangju; Referees: Germán Moller (ARG), Michiel Zwart (NED)

16 July 2019; 12:30	Report	Cuba	4–20	Greece	Nambu University Aquatics Center, Gwangju; Referees: Adrian Alexandrescu (ROU), Ni Shi Wei (CHN)
16 July 2019; 12:30	Report	Score by quarters: 0–5, 3–6, 0–5, 1–4			Nambu University Aquatics Center, Gwangju; Referees: Adrian Alexandrescu (ROU), Ni Shi Wei (CHN)
16 July 2019; 12:30	Report	Carrasco 2	Goals	Avramidou 6	Nambu University Aquatics Center, Gwangju; Referees: Adrian Alexandrescu (ROU), Ni Shi Wei (CHN)

18 July 2019; 08:30	Report	Cuba	6–19	Spain	Nambu University Aquatics Center, Gwangju; Referees: Germán Moller (ARG), Jeremy Cheng (SGP)
18 July 2019; 08:30	Report	Score by quarters: 0–7, 1–6, 4–3, 1–3			Nambu University Aquatics Center, Gwangju; Referees: Germán Moller (ARG), Jeremy Cheng (SGP)
18 July 2019; 08:30	Report	Bernal 3	Goals	García, Ortiz 4	Nambu University Aquatics Center, Gwangju; Referees: Germán Moller (ARG), Jeremy Cheng (SGP)

18 July 2019; 09:50	Report	Greece	13–7	Kazakhstan	Nambu University Aquatics Center, Gwangju; Referees: Sebastien Dervieux (FRA), Adrian Alexandrescu (ROU)
18 July 2019; 09:50	Report	Score by quarters: 4–1, 4–1, 1–3, 4–2			Nambu University Aquatics Center, Gwangju; Referees: Sebastien Dervieux (FRA), Adrian Alexandrescu (ROU)
18 July 2019; 09:50	Report	Xenaki 3	Goals	Zakirova 3	Nambu University Aquatics Center, Gwangju; Referees: Sebastien Dervieux (FRA), Adrian Alexandrescu (ROU)

=== Group D ===
Pos	Team	Pld	W	D	L	GF	GA	GD	Pts	Qualification
1	Italy	3	3	0	0	33	22	+11	6	Quarterfinals
2	Australia	3	2	0	1	32	29	+3	4	Playoffs
3	China	3	1	0	2	26	34	−8	2	Playoffs
4	Japan	3	0	0	3	20	26	−6	0	

Source: Sportresult
Rules for classification: 1) points; 2) head-to-head points; 3) head-to-head goal difference; 4) head-to-head number of goals scored; 5) Goal difference.

14 July 2019; 19:10	Report	Japan	6–8	China	Nambu University Aquatics Center, Gwangju; Referees: Gabriella Várkonyi (HUN), Michael Goldenberg (USA)
14 July 2019; 19:10	Report	Score by quarters: 2–1, 1–1, 2–4, 1–2			Nambu University Aquatics Center, Gwangju; Referees: Gabriella Várkonyi (HUN), Michael Goldenberg (USA)
14 July 2019; 19:10	Report	Arima 3	Goals	Chen, Wang X. 2	Nambu University Aquatics Center, Gwangju; Referees: Gabriella Várkonyi (HUN), Michael Goldenberg (USA)

14 July 2019; 20:30	Report	Italy	10–9	Australia	Nambu University Aquatics Center, Gwangju; Referees: Sebastien Dervieux (FRA), Germán Moller (ARG)
14 July 2019; 20:30	Report	Score by quarters: 3–0, 3–2, 3–3, 1–4			Nambu University Aquatics Center, Gwangju; Referees: Sebastien Dervieux (FRA), Germán Moller (ARG)
14 July 2019; 20:30	Report	Garibotti 3	Goals	Webster 4	Nambu University Aquatics Center, Gwangju; Referees: Sebastien Dervieux (FRA), Germán Moller (ARG)

16 July 2019; 16:30	Report	Australia	14–12	China	Nambu University Aquatics Center, Gwangju; Referees: Viktor Salnichenko (KAZ), Michael Goldenberg (USA)
16 July 2019; 16:30	Report	Score by quarters: 4–4, 5–3, 3–3, 2–2			Nambu University Aquatics Center, Gwangju; Referees: Viktor Salnichenko (KAZ), Michael Goldenberg (USA)
16 July 2019; 16:30	Report	Gofers, Webster 3	Goals	Zhao 4	Nambu University Aquatics Center, Gwangju; Referees: Viktor Salnichenko (KAZ), Michael Goldenberg (USA)

16 July 2019; 17:50	Report	Japan	7–9	Italy	Nambu University Aquatics Center, Gwangju; Referees: Gabriella Várkonyi (HUN), Arkadiy Voevodin (RUS)
16 July 2019; 17:50	Report	Score by quarters: 2–3, 2–3, 1–1, 2–2			Nambu University Aquatics Center, Gwangju; Referees: Gabriella Várkonyi (HUN), Arkadiy Voevodin (RUS)
16 July 2019; 17:50	Report	Arima 3	Goals	Bianconi 5	Nambu University Aquatics Center, Gwangju; Referees: Gabriella Várkonyi (HUN), Arkadiy Voevodin (RUS)

18 July 2019; 11:10	Report	Japan	7–9	Australia	Nambu University Aquatics Center, Gwangju; Referees: Gabriella Várkonyi (HUN), Stanko Ivanovski (MNE)
18 July 2019; 11:10	Report	Score by quarters: 2–3, 2–1, 1–2, 2–3			Nambu University Aquatics Center, Gwangju; Referees: Gabriella Várkonyi (HUN), Stanko Ivanovski (MNE)
18 July 2019; 11:10	Report	three players 2	Goals	Buckling 3	Nambu University Aquatics Center, Gwangju; Referees: Gabriella Várkonyi (HUN), Stanko Ivanovski (MNE)

18 July 2019; 12:30	Report	Italy	14–6	China	Nambu University Aquatics Center, Gwangju; Referees: Marie-Claude Deslieres (CAN), Nenad Periš (CRO)
18 July 2019; 12:30	Report	Score by quarters: 5–1, 3–1, 4–2, 2–2			Nambu University Aquatics Center, Gwangju; Referees: Marie-Claude Deslieres (CAN), Nenad Periš (CRO)
18 July 2019; 12:30	Report	Garibotti, Tabani 3	Goals	Xiong 2	Nambu University Aquatics Center, Gwangju; Referees: Marie-Claude Deslieres (CAN), Nenad Periš (CRO)

== Knockout stage ==
=== Bracket ===
Championship bracket

Playoffs
20 July
Greece	12
China	8
20 July
Kazakhstan	3
Australia	13
20 July
Netherlands	5
Canada	4
20 July
New Zealand	6
Hungary	17

Quarterfinals
22 July
United States	15
Greece	5
22 July
Russia	7
Australia	9
22 July
Spain	12
Netherlands	8
22 July
Italy	6
Hungary	7

Semifinals
24 July
United States	7
Australia	2
24 July
Spain	16
Hungary	10

Final
26 July
United States	11
Spain	6
Third place game
26 July
Australia	10
Hungary	9

5th place bracket

5th–8th place semifinals
24 July
Greece	4
Russia	13
24 July
Netherlands	5
Italy	10

Fifth place game
26 July
Russia	10
Italy	9
Seventh place game
26 July
Greece	9
Netherlands	11

9th place bracket

9th–12th place semifinals
22 July
Canada (PSO)	17
China	16
22 July
New Zealand	12
Kazakhstan (PSO)	14

Ninth place game
24 July
Canada	24
Kazakhstan	7
Eleventh place game
24 July
China	14
New Zealand	12

13th place bracket

13th–16th place semifinals
20 July
South Africa	26
South Korea	3
20 July
Cuba	9
Japan	21

13th place game
22 July
South Africa	2
Japan	21
15th place game
22 July
South Korea	0
Cuba	30

=== Playoffs ===
20 July 2019; 14:00	Report	Netherlands	5–4	Canada	Nambu University Aquatics Center, Gwangju; Referees: Frank Ohme (GER), Stanko Ivanovski (MNE)
20 July 2019; 14:00	Report	Score by quarters: 0–0, 4–2, 0–1, 1–1			Nambu University Aquatics Center, Gwangju; Referees: Frank Ohme (GER), Stanko Ivanovski (MNE)
20 July 2019; 14:00	Report	Megens 2	Goals	E. Wright 2	Nambu University Aquatics Center, Gwangju; Referees: Frank Ohme (GER), Stanko Ivanovski (MNE)

20 July 2019; 15:30	Report	New Zealand	6–17	Hungary	Nambu University Aquatics Center, Gwangju; Referees: Natacha Florestano (BRA), Juan Menéndez (CUB)
20 July 2019; 15:30	Report	Score by quarters: 2–4, 1–4, 1–4, 2–5			Nambu University Aquatics Center, Gwangju; Referees: Natacha Florestano (BRA), Juan Menéndez (CUB)
20 July 2019; 15:30	Report	Houghton, McDowall 2	Goals	Keszthelyi 4	Nambu University Aquatics Center, Gwangju; Referees: Natacha Florestano (BRA), Juan Menéndez (CUB)

20 July 2019; 17:00	Report	Greece	12–8	China	Nambu University Aquatics Center, Gwangju; Referees: Nenad Periš (CRO), Dion Willis (RSA)
20 July 2019; 17:00	Report	Score by quarters: 4–1, 2–2, 4–4, 2–1			Nambu University Aquatics Center, Gwangju; Referees: Nenad Periš (CRO), Dion Willis (RSA)
20 July 2019; 17:00	Report	Plevritou 3	Goals	Zhao 4	Nambu University Aquatics Center, Gwangju; Referees: Nenad Periš (CRO), Dion Willis (RSA)

20 July 2019; 18:30	Report	Kazakhstan	3–13	Australia	Nambu University Aquatics Center, Gwangju; Referees: Vojin Putniković (SRB), Marie-Claude Deslieres (CAN)
20 July 2019; 18:30	Report	Score by quarters: 0–4, 1–2, 2–3, 0–4			Nambu University Aquatics Center, Gwangju; Referees: Vojin Putniković (SRB), Marie-Claude Deslieres (CAN)
20 July 2019; 18:30	Report	Myrzabekova 2	Goals	Halligan 4	Nambu University Aquatics Center, Gwangju; Referees: Vojin Putniković (SRB), Marie-Claude Deslieres (CAN)

=== Quarterfinals ===
22 July 2019; 14:00	Report	United States	15–5	Greece	Nambu University Aquatics Center, Gwangju; Referees: Gabriella Várkonyi (HUN), Jaume Teixidó (ESP)
22 July 2019; 14:00	Report	Score by quarters: 4–0, 4–2, 2–2, 5–1			Nambu University Aquatics Center, Gwangju; Referees: Gabriella Várkonyi (HUN), Jaume Teixidó (ESP)
22 July 2019; 14:00	Report	Musselman 4	Goals	Eleftheriadou, Xenaki 2	Nambu University Aquatics Center, Gwangju; Referees: Gabriella Várkonyi (HUN), Jaume Teixidó (ESP)

22 July 2019; 15:30	Report	Russia	7–9	Australia	Nambu University Aquatics Center, Gwangju; Referees: Alessandro Severo (ITA), Adrian Alexandrescu (ROU)
22 July 2019; 15:30	Report	Score by quarters: 1–2, 0–2, 3–2, 3–3			Nambu University Aquatics Center, Gwangju; Referees: Alessandro Severo (ITA), Adrian Alexandrescu (ROU)
22 July 2019; 15:30	Report	Karimova 2	Goals	Webster 3	Nambu University Aquatics Center, Gwangju; Referees: Alessandro Severo (ITA), Adrian Alexandrescu (ROU)

22 July 2019; 17:00	Report	Spain	12–8	Netherlands	Nambu University Aquatics Center, Gwangju; Referees: Marie-Claude Deslieres (CAN), Nenad Peris (CRO)
22 July 2019; 17:00	Report	Score by quarters: 6–1, 2–3, 2–1, 2–3			Nambu University Aquatics Center, Gwangju; Referees: Marie-Claude Deslieres (CAN), Nenad Peris (CRO)
22 July 2019; 17:00	Report	A. Espar, García 4	Goals	van der Sloot 3	Nambu University Aquatics Center, Gwangju; Referees: Marie-Claude Deslieres (CAN), Nenad Peris (CRO)

22 July 2019; 18:30	Report	Italy	6–7	Hungary	Nambu University Aquatics Center, Gwangju; Referees: Boris Margeta (SLO), Vojin Putniković (SRB)
22 July 2019; 18:30	Report	Score by quarters: 2–4, 2–1, 1–1, 1–1			Nambu University Aquatics Center, Gwangju; Referees: Boris Margeta (SLO), Vojin Putniković (SRB)
22 July 2019; 18:30	Report	six players 1	Goals	Gurisatti, Leimeter 2	Nambu University Aquatics Center, Gwangju; Referees: Boris Margeta (SLO), Vojin Putniković (SRB)

=== 13th–16th place semifinals ===
20 July 2019; 10:30	Report	South Africa	26–3	South Korea	Nambu University Aquatics Center, Gwangju; Referees: Arkadiy Voevodin (RUS), Kunihiro Sato (JPN)
20 July 2019; 10:30	Report	Score by quarters: 7–1, 4–0, 7–1, 8–1			Nambu University Aquatics Center, Gwangju; Referees: Arkadiy Voevodin (RUS), Kunihiro Sato (JPN)
20 July 2019; 10:30	Report	three players 4	Goals	three players 1	Nambu University Aquatics Center, Gwangju; Referees: Arkadiy Voevodin (RUS), Kunihiro Sato (JPN)

20 July 2019; 12:00	Report	Cuba	9–21	Japan	Nambu University Aquatics Center, Gwangju; Referees: Gabriella Várkonyi (HUN), John Waldow (NZL)
20 July 2019; 12:00	Report	Score by quarters: 3–6, 2–6, 2–4, 2–5			Nambu University Aquatics Center, Gwangju; Referees: Gabriella Várkonyi (HUN), John Waldow (NZL)
20 July 2019; 12:00	Report	Bernal 3	Goals	Arima 5	Nambu University Aquatics Center, Gwangju; Referees: Gabriella Várkonyi (HUN), John Waldow (NZL)

=== 9th–12th place semifinals ===
22 July 2019; 11:00	Report	Canada	17–16 (PSO)	China	Nambu University Aquatics Center, Gwangju; Referees: Frank Ohme (GER), Daniel Flahive (AUS)
22 July 2019; 11:00	Report	Score by quarters: 4–4, 3–4, 1–1, 2–1 PSO: 7–6			Nambu University Aquatics Center, Gwangju; Referees: Frank Ohme (GER), Daniel Flahive (AUS)
22 July 2019; 11:00	Report	Christmas 3	Goals	Zhang 4	Nambu University Aquatics Center, Gwangju; Referees: Frank Ohme (GER), Daniel Flahive (AUS)

22 July 2019; 12:30	Report	New Zealand	12–14 (PSO)	Kazakhstan	Nambu University Aquatics Center, Gwangju; Referees: Dion Willis (RSA), Georgios Stavridis (GRE)
22 July 2019; 12:30	Report	Score by quarters: 3–6, 3–2, 2–0, 2–2 PSO: 2–4			Nambu University Aquatics Center, Gwangju; Referees: Dion Willis (RSA), Georgios Stavridis (GRE)
22 July 2019; 12:30	Report	Doyle 4	Goals	Mirshina 4	Nambu University Aquatics Center, Gwangju; Referees: Dion Willis (RSA), Georgios Stavridis (GRE)

=== 5th–8th place semifinals ===
24 July 2019; 14:00	Report	Greece	4–13	Russia	Nambu University Aquatics Center, Gwangju; Referees: Stanko Ivanovski (MNE), Jaume Teixidó (ESP)
24 July 2019; 14:00	Report	Score by quarters: 0–2, 1–2, 2–4, 1–5			Nambu University Aquatics Center, Gwangju; Referees: Stanko Ivanovski (MNE), Jaume Teixidó (ESP)
24 July 2019; 14:00	Report	Plevritou 2	Goals	Bersneva, Karimova 3	Nambu University Aquatics Center, Gwangju; Referees: Stanko Ivanovski (MNE), Jaume Teixidó (ESP)

24 July 2019; 15:30	Report	Netherlands	5–10	Italy	Nambu University Aquatics Center, Gwangju; Referees: Frank Ohme (GER), Marie-Claude Deslieres (CAN)
24 July 2019; 15:30	Report	Score by quarters: 1–3, 2–3, 1–2, 1–2			Nambu University Aquatics Center, Gwangju; Referees: Frank Ohme (GER), Marie-Claude Deslieres (CAN)
24 July 2019; 15:30	Report	Megens 3	Goals	Avegno 4	Nambu University Aquatics Center, Gwangju; Referees: Frank Ohme (GER), Marie-Claude Deslieres (CAN)

=== Semifinals ===
24 July 2019; 17:00	Report	United States	7–2	Australia	Nambu University Aquatics Center, Gwangju; Referees: Nenad Peris (CRO), Adrian Alexandrescu (ROU)
24 July 2019; 17:00	Report	Score by quarters: 3–0, 2–0, 1–1, 1–1			Nambu University Aquatics Center, Gwangju; Referees: Nenad Peris (CRO), Adrian Alexandrescu (ROU)
24 July 2019; 17:00	Report	three players 2	Goals	Halligan, Webster 1	Nambu University Aquatics Center, Gwangju; Referees: Nenad Peris (CRO), Adrian Alexandrescu (ROU)

24 July 2019; 18:30	Report	Spain	16–10	Hungary	Nambu University Aquatics Center, Gwangju; Referees: Georgios Stavridis (GRE), Boris Margeta (SLO)
24 July 2019; 18:30	Report	Score by quarters: 5–3, 5–5, 4–1, 2–1			Nambu University Aquatics Center, Gwangju; Referees: Georgios Stavridis (GRE), Boris Margeta (SLO)
24 July 2019; 18:30	Report	Tarragó, Forca 4	Goals	Leimeter 4	Nambu University Aquatics Center, Gwangju; Referees: Georgios Stavridis (GRE), Boris Margeta (SLO)

=== 15th place game ===
22 July 2019; 08:00	Report	South Korea	0–30	Cuba	Nambu University Aquatics Center, Gwangju; Referees: Natacha Florestano (BRA), Viktor Salnichenko (KAZ)
22 July 2019; 08:00	Report	Score by quarters: 0–8, 0–9, 0–6, 0–7			Nambu University Aquatics Center, Gwangju; Referees: Natacha Florestano (BRA), Viktor Salnichenko (KAZ)
22 July 2019; 08:00	Report		Goals	four players 5	Nambu University Aquatics Center, Gwangju; Referees: Natacha Florestano (BRA), Viktor Salnichenko (KAZ)

=== 13th place game ===
22 July 2019; 09:30	Report	South Africa	2–21	Japan	Nambu University Aquatics Center, Gwangju; Referees: John Waldow (NZL), Ni Shi Wei (CHN)
22 July 2019; 09:30	Report	Score by quarters: 0–4, 1–4, 1–6, 0–7			Nambu University Aquatics Center, Gwangju; Referees: John Waldow (NZL), Ni Shi Wei (CHN)
22 July 2019; 09:30	Report	Moir, Hallendorff 1	Goals	Arima 5	Nambu University Aquatics Center, Gwangju; Referees: John Waldow (NZL), Ni Shi Wei (CHN)

=== Eleventh place game ===
24 July 2019; 09:30	Report	China	14–12	New Zealand	Nambu University Aquatics Center, Gwangju; Referees: Natacha Florestano (BRA), Jeremy Cheng (SGP)
24 July 2019; 09:30	Report	Score by quarters: 4–2, 3–2, 4–2, 3–6			Nambu University Aquatics Center, Gwangju; Referees: Natacha Florestano (BRA), Jeremy Cheng (SGP)
24 July 2019; 09:30	Report	Zhang J 3	Goals	McDowall, Houghton 4	Nambu University Aquatics Center, Gwangju; Referees: Natacha Florestano (BRA), Jeremy Cheng (SGP)

=== Ninth place game ===
24 July 2019; 11:00	Report	Canada	24–7	Kazakhstan	Nambu University Aquatics Center, Gwangju; Referees: Sebastien Dervieux (FRA), Dion Willis (RSA)
24 July 2019; 11:00	Report	Score by quarters: 7–3, 5–1, 4–1, 8–2			Nambu University Aquatics Center, Gwangju; Referees: Sebastien Dervieux (FRA), Dion Willis (RSA)
24 July 2019; 11:00	Report	Békhazi 5	Goals	Roga, Mirshina 2	Nambu University Aquatics Center, Gwangju; Referees: Sebastien Dervieux (FRA), Dion Willis (RSA)

=== Seventh place game ===
26 July 2019; 14:00	Report	Greece	9–11	Netherlands	Nambu University Aquatics Center, Gwangju; Referees: Germán Moller (ARG), Alessandro Severo (ITA)
26 July 2019; 14:00	Report	Score by quarters: 2–1, 1–5, 6–4, 0–1			Nambu University Aquatics Center, Gwangju; Referees: Germán Moller (ARG), Alessandro Severo (ITA)
26 July 2019; 14:00	Report	Kotsia 3	Goals	Megens, Keuning 3	Nambu University Aquatics Center, Gwangju; Referees: Germán Moller (ARG), Alessandro Severo (ITA)

=== Fifth place game ===
26 July 2019; 15:30	Report	Russia	10–9	Italy	Nambu University Aquatics Center, Gwangju; Referees: Gabriella Várkonyi (HUN), Sebastien Dervieux (FRA)
26 July 2019; 15:30	Report	Score by quarters: 3–3, 1–2, 5–2, 1–2			Nambu University Aquatics Center, Gwangju; Referees: Gabriella Várkonyi (HUN), Sebastien Dervieux (FRA)
26 July 2019; 15:30	Report	three players 2	Goals	Bianconi, Chiappini 3	Nambu University Aquatics Center, Gwangju; Referees: Gabriella Várkonyi (HUN), Sebastien Dervieux (FRA)

=== Bronze Medal match ===
26 July 2019; 17:00	Report	Australia	10–9	Hungary	Nambu University Aquatics Center, Gwangju; Referees: Marie-Claude Deslieres (CAN), Jaume Teixidó (ESP)
26 July 2019; 17:00	Report	Score by quarters: 3–3, 4–3, 1–1, 2–2			Nambu University Aquatics Center, Gwangju; Referees: Marie-Claude Deslieres (CAN), Jaume Teixidó (ESP)
26 July 2019; 17:00	Report	Arancini 3	Goals	Keszthelyi 3	Nambu University Aquatics Center, Gwangju; Referees: Marie-Claude Deslieres (CAN), Jaume Teixidó (ESP)

=== Gold Medal match ===
26 July 2019; 18:30	Report	United States	11–6	Spain	Nambu University Aquatics Center, Gwangju; Referees: Michiel Zwart (NED), Nenad Peris (CRO)
26 July 2019; 18:30	Report	Score by quarters: 3–1, 2–2, 4–0, 2–3			Nambu University Aquatics Center, Gwangju; Referees: Michiel Zwart (NED), Nenad Peris (CRO)
26 July 2019; 18:30	Report	Neushul 3	Goals	Tarragó 3	Nambu University Aquatics Center, Gwangju; Referees: Michiel Zwart (NED), Nenad Peris (CRO)

== Final standing ==
Qualified for the 2020 Olympic Games
Qualified for the 2020 Olympic Games as winner of 2019 World League

Rank	Team
1st place, gold medalist(s)	United States
2nd place, silver medalist(s)	Spain
3rd place, bronze medalist(s)	Australia
4	Hungary
5	Russia
6	Italy
7	Netherlands
8	Greece
9	Canada
10	Kazakhstan
11	China
12	New Zealand
13	Japan
14	South Africa
15	Cuba
16	South Korea

2019 Women's Water Polo World champions

United States
Sixth title

Team roster

Amanda Longan, Maddie Musselman, Melissa Seidemann, Rachel Fattal, Paige Hauschild, Maggie Steffens (C), Stephania Haralabidis, Kiley Neushul, Aria Fischer, Kaleigh Gilchrist, Makenzie Fischer, Alys Williams, Ashleigh Johnson. Head coach: Adam Krikorian.

== Awards and statistics ==
=== Top goalscorers ===
Rank	Name	Goals	Shots	%
1	(Hungary) Rita Keszthelyi	24	55	44
2	(Netherlands) Maud Megens	20	42	48
3	(Japan) Yumi Arima	18	41	44
3	(Hungary) Gréta Gurisatti	18	27	67
5	(New Zealand) Morgan McDowall	17	32	53
6	(New Zealand) Bernadette Doyle	16	32	50
6	(Hungary) Dorottya Szilágyi	16	35	46
6	(Spain) Roser Tarragó	16	32	50
9	(Hungary) Rebecca Parkes	15	22	68
9	(Canada) Emma Wright	15	36	42

=== Awards ===
The awards and all-star team were announced on 26 July 2019.

Most Valuable Player

- (Spain) Roser Tarragó

Most Valuable Goalkeeper

- (Spain) Laura Ester

Highest Goalscorer

- (Hungary) Rita Keszthelyi – 24 goals

Media All-Star Team

- (Spain) Laura Ester – Goalkeeper
- (United States) Aria Fischer – Centre forward
- (United States) Stephania Haralabidis
- (Hungary) Rita Keszthelyi
- (Netherlands) Maud Megens
- (Russia) Alena Serzhantova
- (Spain) Roser Tarragó
