= Amica Hallenndorff =

South African water polo player (born 1992)

Amica Hallendorff
Personal information
- Nationality: South African
- Born: 26 October 1992 (age 33)

Sport
- Sport: Water polo

Amica Hallendorff (born 26 October 1992) is a South African water polo player, who is a member of the South Africa women's national water polo team. She was part of the team in the women's water polo tournament at the 2020 Summer Olympics.

She competed at the 2014 FINA Women's Water Polo World Cup, 2018 FINA Women's Water Polo World Cup, 2019 FINA Women's Water Polo World League.
