= Makenzie Fischer =

American water polo player (born 1997)

Personal information
- Nationality: American
- Born: March 29, 1997 (age 29) Laguna Beach, California, U.S.
- Height: 1.86 m (6 ft 1 in)
- Relative(s): Erich Fischer, Aria Fischer

Sport
- Country: United States
- Sport: Water polo
- Position: Defensive Center Back; Utility Defender; Also Offensive Driver
- College team: Stanford University
- Club: Laguna Beach WP Club; Saddleback El Toro (SET) WP Club
- Coached by: Erich Fischer, Laguna Beach WP Club; John Tanner (Stanford); Adam Krikorian (Olympics)
Medal record
Olympic Games
Gold medal – first place	2016 Rio de Janeiro	Team
Gold medal – first place	2020 Tokyo	Team
World Championships
Gold medal – first place	2015 Kazan	Team
Gold medal – first place	2017 Budapest	Team
Gold medal – first place	2019 Gwangju	Team
Pan American Games
Gold medal – first place	2019 Lima	Team

Makenzie Fischer (born March 29, 1997) is an American water polo player who was an All-American competing for Stanford University. She was part of the gold medal-winning American team at the 2015 World Aquatics Championships, where she played in the centre back position. She was part of the gold medal-winning American teams at the 2016 Summer Olympics in Rio de Janeiro and the 2020 Summer Olympics in Tokyo and was later a recipient of the Peter J. Cutino Award in her final year at Stanford in 2022 as the top collegiate water polo player of the year.

== Early life ==
Fischer was born to Mr. and Mrs. Erich R. Fischer on March 29, 1997 in Laguna Beach, California, where she grew up. She graduated from Laguna Beach High School in 2015. Makenzie's father Erich Fischer was twice an All-American water polo player at Stanford, and played with the U.S. team that placed fourth at the 1992 Summer Olympics in Barcelona. Father Eric had been a former water polo player for Stanford, helping to lead them to national titles in 1985 and 1986. Makenzie's sister Aria Fischer also played water polo for the U.S. National team and was a U.S. teammate when Makenzie won gold medals at the 2016 Summer Olympics in Rio de Jainero and the 2020 Summer Olympics in Tokyo. Makenzie's uncle, Martin Fischer, played goalkeeper for Stanford's men's water polo team.

In her early years, Makenzie was co-coached in age-group water polo by her father Erich at the Laguna Beach Water Polo Club, and later moved to the Saddleback El Toro (SET) water polo club.

=== Laguna Beach High ===
Representing Laguna Beach High, in both 2014 and 2015, Makenzie was a Division I Champion in the California Interscholastic Federation (CIF) Southern Section. She held a career scoring record for Laguna Beach of 456. In 2015, she was an important part of the Laguna Beach High water polo team that earned an unbeaten 31-0 record. In a notable distinction, she was twice a California Interscholastic Southern Section Player of the Year, and was twice a Player of the Year selection for the Orange County Register.

=== Stanford University ===
Cutino Award trophy

Fischer played water polo for the strong program at Stanford University under Head Coach John Tanner while majoring in mechanical engineering. In her Freshman year, she helped lead Stanford to an NCAA Championship. A versatile player, she could play as a Driver on offense at Stanford or in a strong defensive role as a Center Back or a Utility defender with the U.S. national team.

In 2019, she was an All-American first team honoree, earned MVP honors at the 2019 NCAA national championship, and was voted first team All-NCAA Tournament. In the 2019 season she was credited with over 80 goals. Strong in championship games, she was a 1stTeam NCAA All-Tournament honoree in 2017. She took off her first year at Stanford to train with the U.S. National team, known as Team USA.

In 2022, in a distinct honor as a returning fifth year Senior, she received the Peter J. Cutino Award, given to the top collegiate water polo player of the year. A noteworthy scholar, she was earned the Association of College Water Polo Coaches' ACWPC All-Academic honors, Mountain Pacific Sports Federation All Academic Honors, and was on the Pac-12 Conference Honor Roll.

== Olympics ==
=== 2016 Rio de Jainero Olympic gold ===
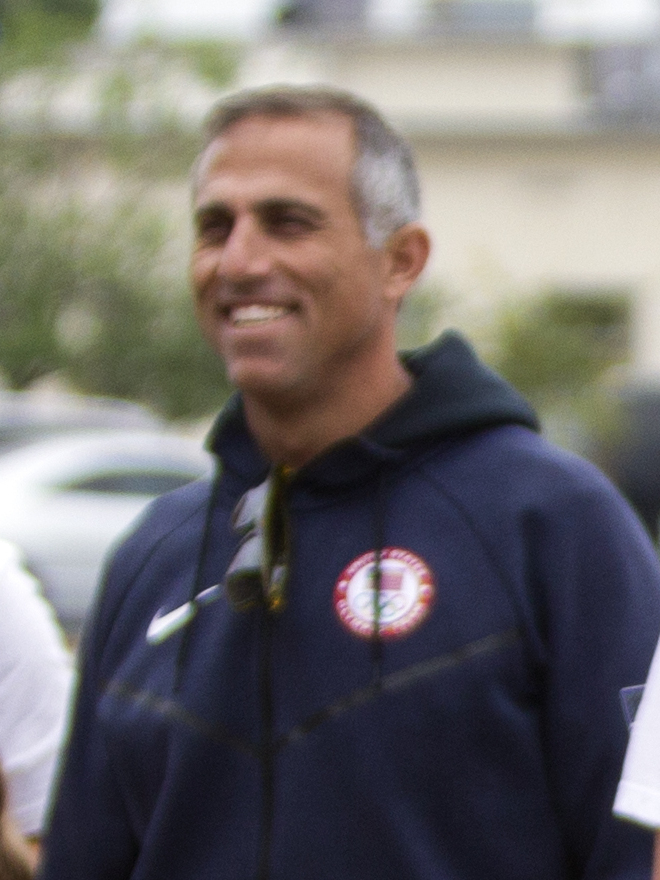
Coach Krikorian

At 19, as one of the younger women's water polo team members at the 2016 Olympics in Rio de Janeiro, Fischer won the gold medal at the Women's Olympic Water polo competition under the management of U.S. Olympic Women's Water Polo Head Coach Adam Krikorian. Krikorian had played water polo for UCLA, and had an outstanding record coaching the UCLA women's team. The American women's team, defending their 2012 gold medal, captured the gold for a second consecutive Olympics with a strong 12–5 victory over Italy, who had performed well in the preliminary rounds. The U.S. women's team became the only competitor that had received a medal in all five Olympic water polo tournaments open to women. Russia took home the bronze medal by defeating Hungary, a dominant international team.

=== 2020 Tokyo Olympic gold ===
Fischer competed with the U.S. women's water polo team at the 2020 Summer Olympics in Tokyo, where she won her second gold medal in the women's water polo tournament under Head Coach Adam Krikorian. In 2020, the United States was a distinct pre-Olympic favorite to win the gold medal, having captured the two previous Olympic medals in 2012 and 2016 under Krikorian, as well as having won the 2015, 2017, and 2019 World Championships.

In final competition, the U.S. women's team won the gold medal, defeating Spain 14-5 in the final round to determine the gold and silver medal winners. Strong in the late rounds, the U.S. Women had previously won both their quarter-final and semi-final rounds, while Spain beat the strong women's teams from China and Hungary to also move to the final round. In early rounds, in an unexpected outcome, the U.S. women had lost to Hungary, a country with a strong tradition in men's water polo. As noted, the U.S. women took the gold medal, Spain took the silver, and Hungary took the bronze.

== See also ==
- United States women's Olympic water polo team records and statistics
- List of Olympic champions in women's water polo
- List of Olympic medalists in water polo (women)
- List of world champions in women's water polo
- List of World Aquatics Championships medalists in water polo
