= Miku Koide =

Japanese water polo player

Personal information
- Nationality: Japanese
- Born: 21 May 1992 (age 34)
- Height: 172 cm (68 in)
- Weight: 78 kg (172 lb)

Sport
- Sport: Water polo

Miku Koide (小出 未来; born 21 May 1992) is a Japanese water polo player. She was selected to the Japan women's national water polo team, for the 2020 Summer Olympics.

She participated at the 2019 World Aquatics Championships, and 2019 FINA Women's Water Polo World League.
