= Keesja Gofers =

Australian water polo player

Personal information
- Full name: Keesja Kaia Gofers
- Born: 16 March 1990 (age 36) St Leonards, Sydney, New South Wales, Australia
- Home town: Beecroft
- Height: 1.78 m (5 ft 10 in)
- Weight: 64 kg (141 lb)

Sport
- Country: Australia
- Sport: Water polo
- Club: Sydney Uni Lions
- Coached by: Rebecca Rippon; Dusan Krstic
Medal record
Olympic Games
Silver medal – second place	2024 Paris	Team
World Championships
Silver medal – second place	2013 Barcelona	Team
Bronze medal – third place	2019 Gwangju	Team

Keesja Kaia Gofers (/ˈkeɪʃɑː/ KAY-shah; born 16 March 1990) is an Australian water polo player.

== Water polo career ==
Gofers won the silver medal at the 2013 World Aquatics Championships in Barcelona, Spain, and the bronze medal at the 2019 World Aquatics Championships in Gwangju, South Korea.

She competed at the 2016 Summer Olympics and the Tokyo 2020 Olympics.

In the 2020 Summer Olympics, the Australian Stingers went through to the quarterfinals by finishing second in their pool. They were beaten 8–9 by Russia and therefore did not compete for an Olympic medal.

Gofers was part of the Australian Stingers team that won a silver medal at the Paris 2024 Summer Olympics.

== Personal life ==
Keesja Gofers is the sister of Australian Water Polo player Taniele Gofers and Australian Handball player Allira Hudson-Gofers.

== See also ==
- List of Olympic medalists in water polo (women)
- List of World Aquatics Championships medalists in water polo
