= Joanne Koenders =

Dutch water polo player (born 1997)

Personal information
- Nationality: Dutch
- Born: 28 February 1997 (age 29) Arnhem
- Height: 1.76 m (5 ft 9 in)
- Weight: 70 kg (154 lb)

Sport
- Sport: Water polo
- Position: Goalkeeper
- Current club: Polar Bears
National team
- Years: Team
- Netherlands

Joanne Koenders (born 28 February 1997 in Arnhem) is a Dutch water polo goalkeeper for the Polar Bears in Ede, Netherlands. Previously she played for ENC Arnhem. With Polar Bears, Koenders won the 2018 Dutch Championship and the 2019 KNZB Cup.

Koenders was first selected for the Dutch national team in 2017. She was part of the Dutch team that participated in the 2019 World Championships.
