= Kaleigh Gilchrist =

American water polo player

Personal information
- Full name: Kaleigh Drew Gilchrist
- Born: May 16, 1992 (age 34) Newport Beach, California, U.S.
- Height: 5 ft 9 in (175 cm)
- Weight: 160 lb (73 kg)
- Relative(s): Sandy Gilchrist, Allen Gilchrist

Sport
- Country: United States
- Sport: Water polo Surfing
- Position: Primarily Driver (WP)
- College team: University of Southern California
- Club: Newport Harbor WP Club
- Coached by: Bill Barnett (Newport Harbor High); Jovan Vavic (U. South. Cal WP); Adam Krikorian (Olympics)
Medal record
Woman's water polo
Representing the United States
Olympic Games
Gold medal – first place	2016 Rio de Janeiro	Team
Gold medal – first place	2020 Tokyo	Team
World Championships
Gold medal – first place	2015 Kazan	Team
Gold medal – first place	2019 Gwangju	Team
Gold medal – first place	2022 Budapest	Team
Gold medal – first place	2024 Doha	Team
World Cup
Gold medal – first place	2023 Long Beach

Kaleigh Drew Gilchrist (/ˈkeɪli ˈɡɪlkrɪst/ KAY-lee GHIL-krist; born May 16, 1992) is an American dual sport athlete in surfing and water polo who competed in water polo for the University of Southern California. She won Surfing America titles in 2009, and 2010, and later competed professionally. She was part of the gold medal-winning US Women's Olympic water polo Team at the 2016 Summer Olympics in Rio de Janeiro, contributing 6 goals, and again won water polo gold at the 2020 Summer Olympics in Tokyo, scoring two goals in the final round against Spain. She scored a total of five goals as part of the women's water polo squad at the 2024 Summer Olympics in Paris that finished fourth overall.

== Early life ==
Gilchrist was born one of two sisters in Newport Beach, California, on May 16, 1992 to mother Jenny and father Sandy Gilchrist. From an athletic family, her father, Sandy Gilchrist was a former swimmer who represented Canada at the 1964 Summer Olympics and the 1968 Summer Olympics. Kaleigh's Uncle Allen Gilchrist swam for USC in the mid-60's and represented Canada in the 1948 and 1952 Olympics. Kayleigh began her athletic career in both swimming and water polo at the Newport Harbor Club around the age of eight where she began in club competition well before beginning high school.

Gilchrist attended and played water polo for Newport Harbor High from 2006-2010 under water polo Hall of Fame Coach William "Bill" Barnett, who had served as a 1988 and 1994 Olympic coach. While playing for Newport Harbor High, Kayleigh was part of Newport High's CIF Southern Section championship water polo team during the 2008 season. She received All-California Interscholastic Federation (CIF) First Team honors in both 2010 and 2009.

In addition to her water polo championship, she represented the US Surf Team at 5 ISA World Championships. During her High School years, Gilchrist won back-to-back Surfing America titles in 2009 and 2010, and was crowned as the best 18 and under female in America. She won another title as the National Scholastic Surfing Association (NSSA) high school champion. In 2010, she was voted the Orange County Register athlete of the year. In club sports, she trained and competed in water polo with the Newport Harbor Club team.

=== University of Southern California ===
Enrolling around 2010, and graduating in 2014, Gilchrist attended the University of Southern California majoring in Communication and minoring in Occupational Science. Playing water polo for Head Women's Coach Jovan Vavic, Gilchrist co-captained USC's 2013 NCAA Championship team. She also won a national title for USC at the National Scholastic Surfing Association (NSSA) collegiate championships. By the end of her Senior year, she was Southern California's eleventh highest all-time women's water polo scorer with 35 goals that year, and 142 in her collegiate career. While at USC, she was a member of the Pi Beta Phi sorority.

== Olympics ==
=== 2016 Rio Olympic gold medal ===
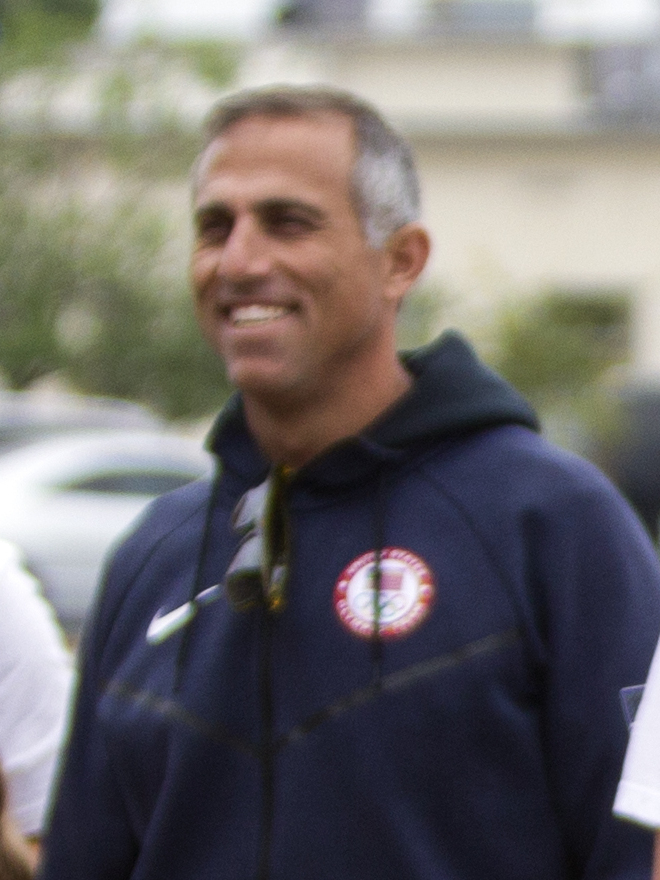
Krikorian in 2018

After graduating USC, Gilchrist joined the US national water polo team in 2014, and subsequently competed for the US national team in the 2016 and 2020 summer Olympic games. She was part of the U.S. team that won the gold medal at the 2016 Summer Olympics in Rio de Janeiro, where she was coached by Adam Krikorian, in the Olympic water polo competition. Krikorian had played water polo for UCLA, and had an outstanding record coaching the UCLA women's team. The American women's team, defending their 2012 gold medal, captured the gold for a second consecutive Olympics with a strong 12–5 victory over Italy, who had performed well in the preliminary rounds. Gilchrist scored a total of 6 goals in tournament play at the 2016 Olympics. The U.S. women's team became the only women's water polo competitor that had received a medal in all five Olympic water polo tournaments open to women. In the bronze medal round, Russia took home the bronze medal by defeating Hungary, a dominant international team.

=== 2020 Tokyo Olympic gold ===
On July 27, 2019 Gilchrist suffered a serious laceration on her leg after a balcony collapse at a nightclub in Gwangju, South Korea, requiring a total of 30 stitches to close the wound. She recovered and returned to training. After physical therapy, and focused training, she was selected for the 2020 Olympic water polo team. The 2020 Olympics being held in 2021 gave her an extra year to train.

Managed again by head Olympic women's coach Adam Krikorian, at the 2020 Summer Olympics in Tokyo, Gilchrist won her second Olympic gold medal in the Women's Olympic water polo competition actually held in 2021. Gilchrist had two goals in the final round against Spain where the U.S. team won, with a final score of 14-5. In 2020, the United States was a distinct pre-Olympic favorite to win the gold medal, having captured the two previous Olympic medals in 2012 and 2016 under Krikorian, as well as having won the 2015, 2017, and 2019 World Championships. The U.S. women took the gold medal, Spain took the silver, and Hungary took the bronze.

=== 2024 Paris Olympics ===
In May 2024, despite suffering a serious injury to her leg in 2019, Gilchrist was announced as one of the members of the Team USA water polo squad for the 2024 Olympic games in Paris. The team from Spain took the gold, with Australia taking the silver, and Netherlands winning the bronze. Gilchrist scored a total of five goals in 2024 Olympic competition. The U.S. women's team placed fourth overall. At age 32, Kaleigh announced her retirement from elite competition following the 2024 Olympics.

=== Non-Olympic international highlights ===
In international competition, Kaleigh captured a gold medal at the World Championships in 2022, 2019 and 2015, and 2024. She won a gold at the 2015 Pan American Championships in Toronto, Canada, and the 2023 Pan American Games in Santiago and won gold with the U.S. team at the World Cup in Long Beach in 2023.

=== Life outside athletics ===
In August 2024, Gilchrist married Tom Gehret in Santa Barbara. In professional pursuits, she has acted as a brand ambassador, surfed professionally, and worked with media.

== See also ==
- United States women's Olympic water polo team records and statistics
- List of Olympic champions in women's water polo
- List of Olympic medalists in water polo (women)
- List of world champions in women's water polo
- List of World Aquatics Championships medalists in water polo
