= Aria Fischer =

American water polo player (born 1999)

Personal information
- Born: March 2, 1999 (age 27) Laguna Beach, California, U.S.
- Height: 1.83 m (6 ft 0 in)
- Weight: 78 kg (172 lb)
- Relatives: Erich Fischer, Makenzie Fischer

Sport
- Country: United States
- Sport: Water polo
- Position: 2-meter (Center) (Water Polo)
- College team: Stanford University
- Club: Saddleback El Toro (SET)
- Coached by: Erich Fischer, Laguna Beach WP Club; Ethan Damato (Laguna Beach High); John Tanner (Stanford); Adam Krikorian (Olympics)
Medal record
Olympic Games
Gold medal – first place	2016 Rio de Janeiro	Team
Gold medal – first place	2020 Tokyo	Team
World Championships
Gold medal – first place	2017 Budapest	Team
Gold medal – first place	2019 Gwangju	Team
Pan American Games
Gold medal – first place	2019 Lima	Team
Summer Universiade
Gold medal – first place	2017 Taipei	Team

Aria Fischer (born March 2, 1999), is a water polo player who competed for Stanford University,and represented the United States at the 2016 Summer Olympics in Rio de Jainero where she won the gold medal in the women's water polo team championship, and in the 2020 Summer Olympics in Tokyo where she again won the gold medal in the women's water polo team championship.

== Early life and family ==
Aria Fischer was born March 2, 1999 in Laguna Beach, California to Mr. and Mrs. Eric R. Fisher. Aria's father Erich Fischer was twice an All-American water polo player at Stanford, and played with the U.S. team that placed fourth at the 1992 Summer Olympics in Barcelona. Aria's sister Makenzie Fischer also played water polo for the U.S. National team and was a U.S. teammate U.S. when Aria won gold medals at the 2016 Summer Olympics in Rio de Jainero and the 2020 Summer Olympics in Tokyo. Aria's uncle, Martin Fischer, played goalkeeper for Stanford's men's water polo team.

In her early years, Aria was co-coached in water polo by her father Erich at the Laguna Beach Water Polo Club, and later moved to the Saddleback El Toro (SET) water polo club.

== Laguna Beach High ==
Graduating in 2017, Aria attended Laguna Beach High School, where she was coached by Ethan Damato. Damato led the Laguna Beach women's program from 2011-2025 to six CIF Southern Section titles, two Southern California Regional Championships and had three of his women players win sports on Olympic teams. Playing for Laguna Beach, Aria was part of three California Interscholastic Federation Southern Section Division 1 Championships. In 2017 under Damato, Fischer helped lead Laguna Beach to a noteworthy undefeated season of 31-0 and in 2014, a record of 30-1. She was the recipient of honors in both 2014 and 2015 as an All-Southern Section Division 1 player. In 2016, she left Laguna Beach High to begin training full time with the U.S. National team.

== Stanford University ==
Cutino Award trophy

Aria attended and played water polo for Stanford University from around 2018-2024, where she majored in English and was coached by John Tanner. During her collegiate tenure with the team, the Stanford women won the 2019, 2022, and 2023 NCAA Championship. Fischer was a 2023 recipient of the Peter J. Cutino Award given to the outstanding collegiate woman player of the year, was a 2023 Player of the Year for the Association of Collegiate Water Polo Coaches (ACWPC), and was an ACWPC All American in 2018, 2019, 2022, and 2023. An equally capable scholar, she earned ACWPC All-Academic honors four times, and was twice on the Academic Honor Roll for the Pac-12 Conference.

=== International competition ===
In non-Olympic international competition highlights, Aria won gold medals at the World Aquatics Championships in 2017 in Budapest, Hungary and in 2019 in Grangju, China. She won another gold at the 2017 Summer Universiade in Taipei, and a gold at the 2019 Pan American championships in Lima, Peru.

== Olympics ==
=== 2016 Rio de Jainero Olympic gold ===
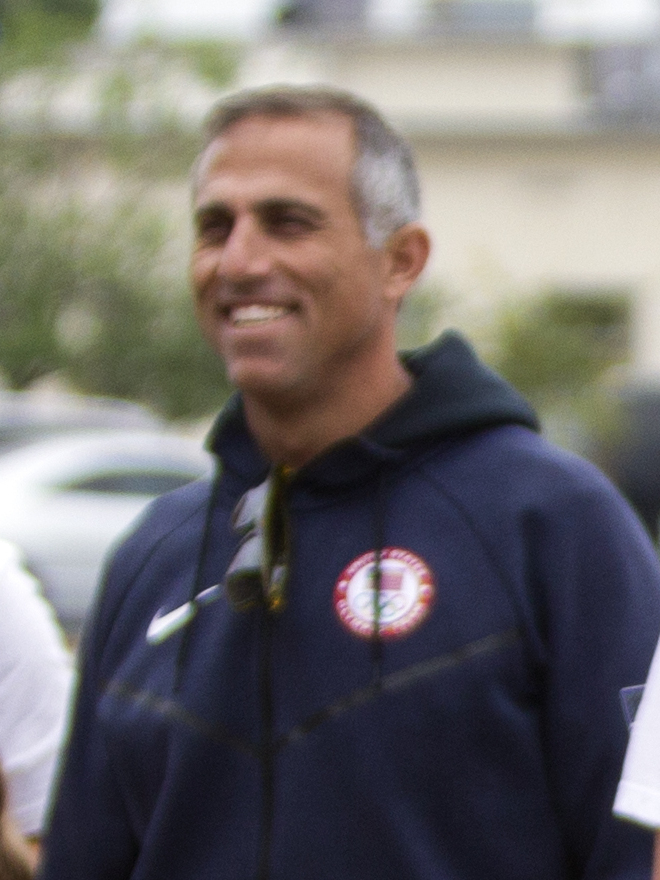
Coach Krikorian

At 16, the youngest women's water polo team member at the 2016 Olympics in Rio de Janeiro, Fischer won the gold medal at the Women's Olympic Water polo competition under the management of U.S. Olympic Women's Water Polo Head Coach Adam Krikorian. Krikorian had played water polo for UCLA, and had an outstanding record coaching the UCLA women's team. The American women's team, defending their 2012 gold medal, captured the gold for a second consecutive Olympics with a strong 12–5 victory over Italy, who had performed well in the preliminary rounds. The U.S. women's team became the only competitor that had received a medal in all five Olympic water polo tournaments open to women. Russia took home the bronze medal by defeating Hungary, a dominant international team.

=== 2020 Tokyo Olympic gold ===
Fischer competed with the U.S. women's water polo team at the 2020 Summer Olympics in Tokyo, scoring a total of ten goals, and winning her second gold medal in the women's water polo tournament under Head Coach Adam Krikorian. In 2020, the United States was a distinct pre-Olympic favorite to win the gold medal, having captured the two previous Olympic medals in 2012 and 2016 under Krikorian, as well as having won the 2015, 2017, and 2019 World Championships.

In final competition, the U.S. women's team won the gold medal, defeating Spain 14-5 in the final round to determine the gold and silver medal winners. Strong in the late rounds, the U.S. Women had previously won both their quarter-final and semi-final rounds, while Spain beat the strong women's teams from China and Hungary to also move to the final round. In early rounds, in an unexpected outcome, the U.S. women had lost to Hungary, a country with a strong tradition in men's water polo. As noted, the U.S. women took the gold medal, Spain took the silver, and Hungary took the bronze.

== See also ==
- United States women's Olympic water polo team records and statistics
- List of Olympic champions in women's water polo
- List of Olympic medalists in water polo (women)
- List of world champions in women's water polo
- List of World Aquatics Championships medalists in water polo
