= Anikó Gyöngyössy =

Hungarian water polo player (born 1990)

Personal information
- Nationality: Hungarian
- Born: 29 May 1990 (age 36) Budapest, Hungary
- Height: 1.85 m (6 ft 1 in)
- Weight: 98 kg (216 lb)

Sport
- Sport: Water polo
- Position: Centre-forward
- Current club: BVSC
Medal record
Women's water polo
Representing Hungary
Olympic Games
| Bronze medal – third place | 2020 Tokyo | Team |
European Championships
| Bronze medal – third place | 2020 Budapest |
World League - Super Final
| Silver medal – second place | 2021 Athens |
- Updated on August 7, 2021

Anikó Gyöngyössy (born 21 May 1990) is a Hungarian water polo player. A centre-forward, she played for BVSC-Zugló until 2022. At the 2020 Summer Olympics she competed for the Hungary women's national water polo team in the women's tournament.

She played with the national team at the 2009 World Aquatics Championships, 2010 Women's European Water Polo Championship, 2019 World Aquatics Championships, and the 2020 Women's European Water Polo Championship.
