= Georgie Moir =

South African water polo player (born 1997)

Georgia Moir
Personal information
- Born: 5 December 1997 (age 27)

Sport
- Country: South Africa
- Sport: Water Polo

Georgie Moir (born 1997) is a South African water polo player.

She was part of the South Africa women's national water polo team at the 2020 Tokyo Summer Olympics, where they ranked 10th.

== Career statistics ==
Event	Country	Rank	Date	Points
Tokyo Summer Olympic Games 2020	JAP	10	1 August 2021	14 - 1
