= Kyra Christmas =

Canadian water polo player (born 1997)

Personal information
- Born: 14 March 1997 (age 29) High River, Alberta, Canada
- Height: 182 cm (6 ft 0 in)

Sport
- Sport: Water polo
- Team: Canada women's national water polo team; University of the Pacific
Medal record
Representing Canada
Pan American Games
Silver medal – second place	2019 Lima	Team

Kyra Christmas (born 14 March 1997) is a Canadian water polo player who is a member of the Canada women's national water polo team. She was part of the team at the 2017 World Aquatics Championships and 2019 Pan American Games. She was part of the team in the women's water polo tournament at the 2020 Summer Olympics.

She played for the University of the Pacific's women's water polo team.
