= Tokyo Tatsumi International Swimming Center =

Swimming venue in Tokyo, Japan

- 東京辰巳国際水泳場
- Tatsumi Water Polo Centre
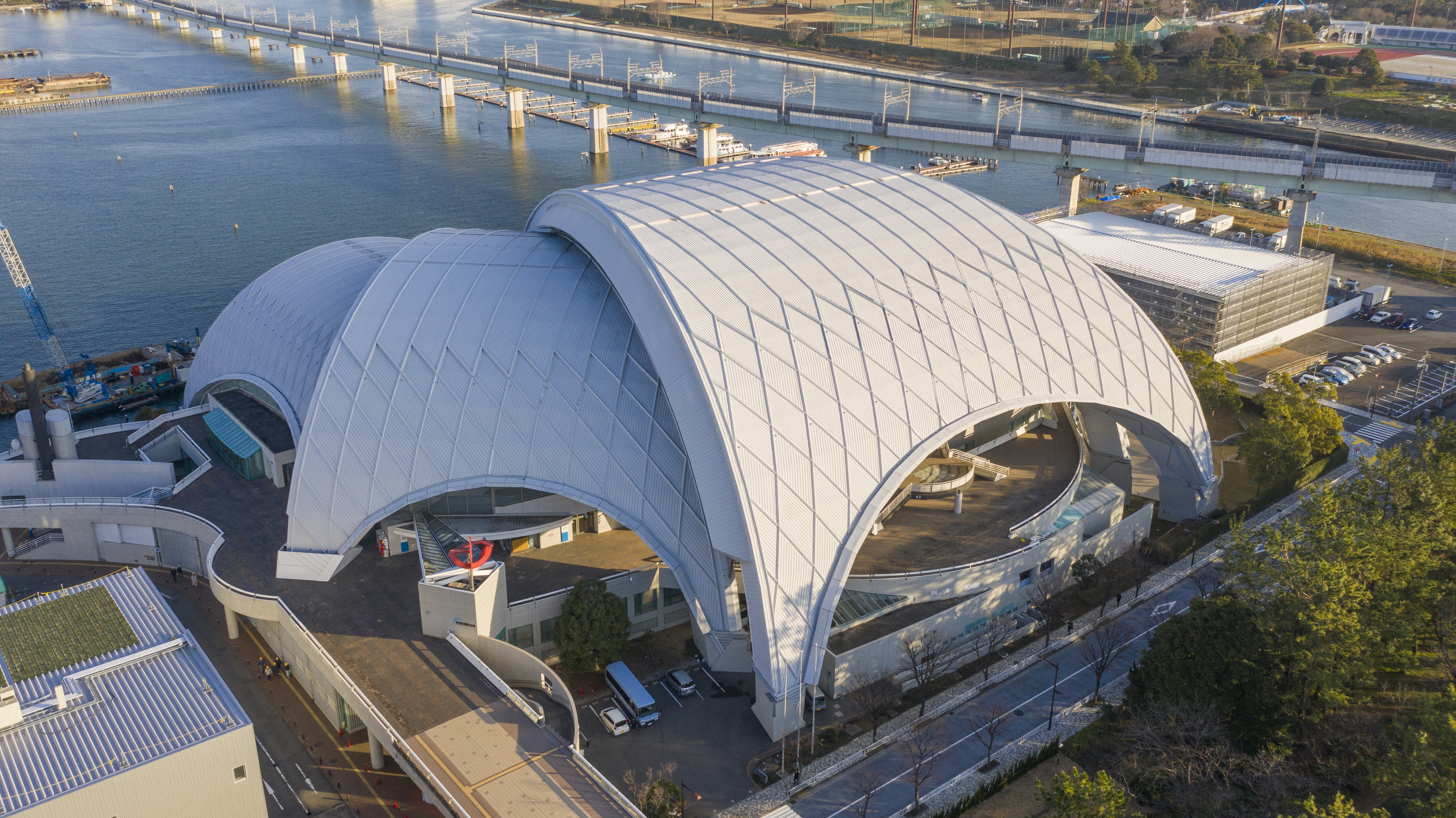
- Aerial view
- Interactive map of Tokyo Tatsumi International Swimming Center
- Location: Kōtō, Tokyo, Japan
- Coordinates: 35.647668°N 139.818944°E
- Capacity: 3,635

Construction
- Built: December 1990 (broke ground)
- Opened: August 1993
- Closed: March 2023
- Architects: Environment Design Institute; Kozo Keikaku Engineering

Tokyo Tatsumi International Swimming Center (東京辰巳国際水泳場, Tōkyō Tatsumi Kokusai Suieijō) is a swimming venue in Kōtō, Tokyo, Japan. The swimming centre has hosted several Japanese swimming championships.

== History ==
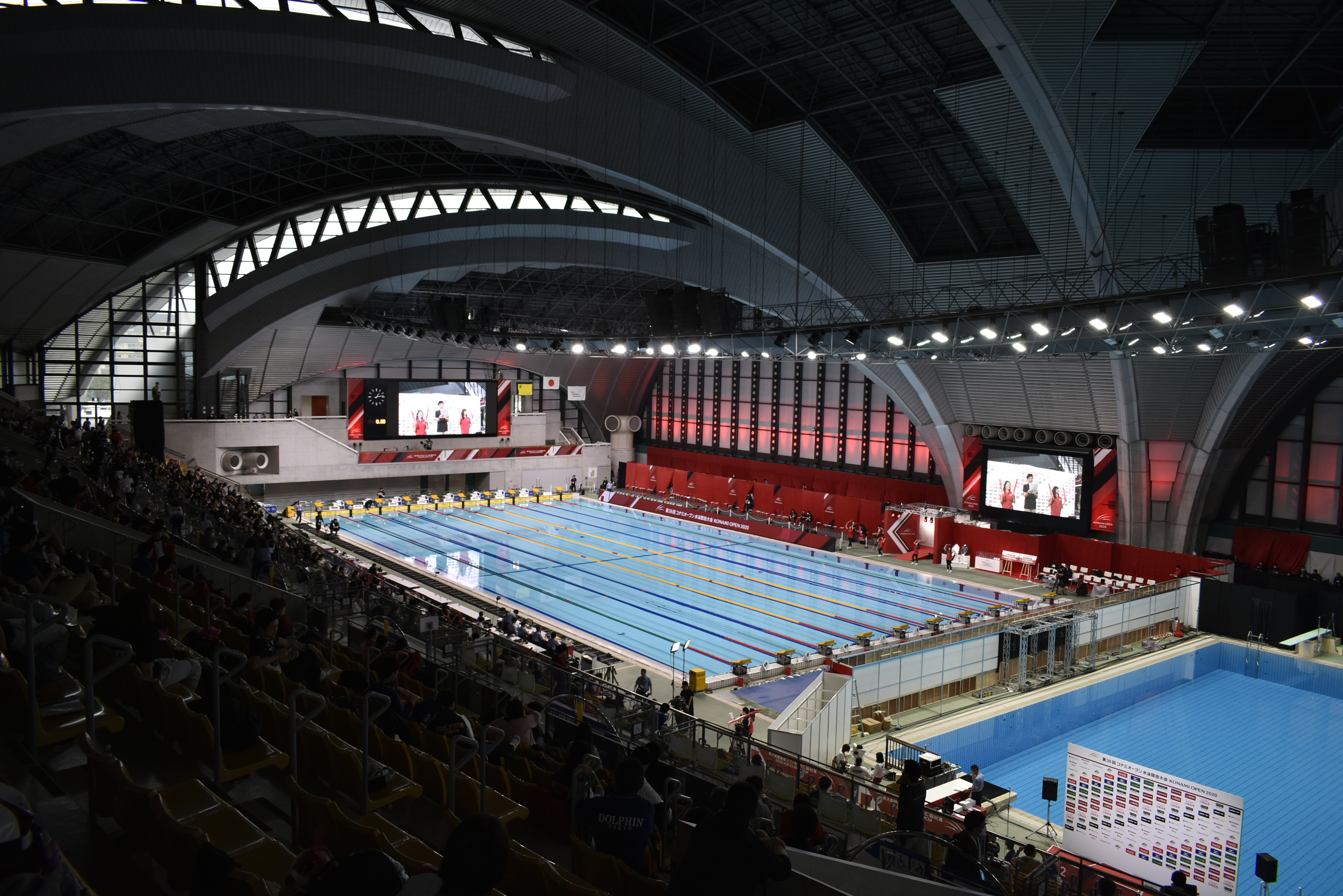
The centre's main pool in 2020

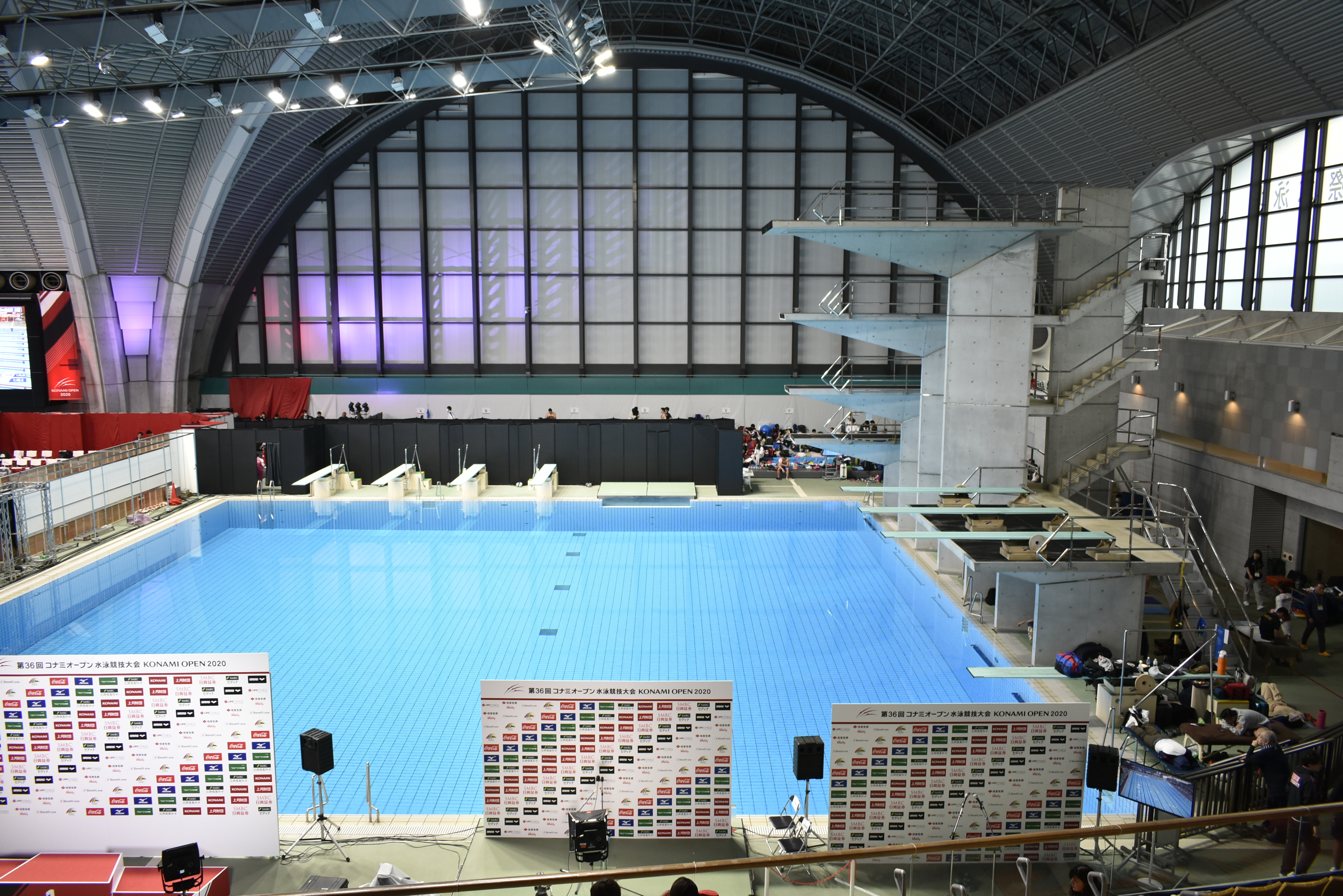
The centre's diving pool in 2020

The swimming complex was designed by the Environment Design Institute, a Tokyo architecture firm. It was commissioned by the Bureau of Port and Harbour, a unit of the Tokyo Metropolitan Government. The building is built largely of steel-reinforced concrete except for the roof, which is a steel pipe space-truss structure. The structural design was by Kozo Keikaku Engineering. The complex was substantially completed in March 1993.

The swimming centre was used for the water polo events at the 2020 Summer Olympics, with the name Tatsumi Water Polo Centre.

In March 2023, the centre was closed to be converted into an ice rink for the local community as well as competitions. The nearby Tokyo Aquatics Centre (which was built for the 2020 Summer Olympics) has replaced the use of the building for swimming competitions as well as public swimming.

== World records broken in the TTISC ==
=== Long course ===
- 200 m breaststroke 2:07.51 Kosuke Kitajima; 8 June 2008
- 200 m breaststroke 2:06.67 Ippei Watanabe; 29 January 2017

=== Short course ===
- 200 m butterfly 2:03.12 Yūko Nakanishi; 23 February 2008
