= Maria Bersneva =

Russian water polo player

Personal information
- Full name: Maria Andreyevna Bersneva
- Nationality: Russia
- Born: 17 December 1998 (age 27) Zlatoust, Russia
- Height: 1.70 m (5 ft 7 in)

Sport
- Sport: Water polo
- Position: Driver
- Current club: Uralochka Zlatoust
Medal record
European Games
Gold medal – first place	2015 Baku	Team

Maria Andreyevna Bersneva (Russian: Мария Андреевна Берснева; born 17 December 1998) is a Russian water polo player. She competed in the 2020 Summer Olympics.
