= Rebecca Parkes =

Hungarian water polo player

Personal information
- Full name: Rebecca Grace Parkes
- Nickname: Bex
- Nationality: New Zealander, Hungarian
- Born: 16 August 1994 (age 32) Hamilton, New Zealand
- Height: 1.82 m (6 ft 0 in)
- Weight: 83 kg (183 lb)

Sport
- Sport: Water polo
- Position: Centre-forward
- Current club: Ethnikos
Medal record
Women's water polo
Representing Hungary
Olympic Games
Bronze medal – third place	2020 Tokyo	Team
World Championships
Silver medal – second place	2022 Budapest	Team
Silver medal – second place	2024 Doha	Team
European Championships
Bronze medal – third place	2020 Budapest
Summer Universiade
Silver medal – second place	2017 Taipei	Team
World League
Silver medal – second place	2021 Athens

Rebecca Grace Parkes (born 16 August 1994) is a Hungarian water polo player originally from New Zealand. At the 2020 Summer Olympics she competed for the Hungary women's national water polo team in the women's tournament.

She plays for the 2021–22 season for Greek club Ethnikos with whom she won the 2022 LEN Trophy.
