= Wang Xinyan =

Chinese water polo player (born 1991)

Personal information
- Born: 26 April 1991 (age 35) Dalian, China
- Height: 181 cm (5 ft 11 in)
- Weight: 72 kg (159 lb)

Sport
- Sport: water polo
Medal record
Representing China
Asian Games
Gold medal – first place	2014 Incheon	Team competition
- Updated on 19 August 2015

Wang Xinyan (born 26 April 1991) is a Chinese water polo player.

She was part of the Chinese team at the 2015 World Aquatics Championships, and the 2016 Summer Olympics.
