= Gréta Gurisatti =

Hungarian water polo player

Personal information
- Nationality: Hungarian
- Born: 14 May 1996 (age 30) Dunaújváros, Hungary
- Height: 1.76 m (5 ft 9 in)
- Weight: 75 kg (165 lb)

Sport
- Sport: Water polo
- Position: Driver
- Current club: Dunaújváros
Medal record
Women's water polo
Representing Hungary
Olympic Games
Bronze medal – third place	2020 Tokyo	Team
World Championships
Silver medal – second place	2022 Budapest	Team
Silver medal – second place	2024 Doha	Team
European Championships
Bronze medal – third place	2020 Budapest
Summer Universiade
Silver medal – second place	2017 Taipei	Team
World League
Silver medal – second place	2021 Athens

Gréta Gurisatti (born 14 May 1996) is a Hungarian water polo player. At the 2020 Summer Olympics she competed for the Hungary women's national water polo team in the women's tournament.

She won the Women's LEN Trophy in 2018 playing for Dunaújváros
