= Erich Fischer (water polo) =

American water polo player (born 1966)

Personal information
- Full name: Erich R. Fischer
- Born: March 12, 1966 (age 60) Dinuba, California, United States
- Height: 190 cm (6 ft 3 in)
- Weight: 86 kg (190 lb)
- Relatives: Daughters Aria, Mackenzie Fischer

Sport
- Sport: Water polo
- Position: Usually Field or Driver (WP)
- College team: Stanford University
- Coached by: Laure Gross (Reedley High); Terry Giffen (Age-group club); D. Dettamanti (Stanford); Bill Barnett (Olympics)

Erich Fischer (born March 12, 1966) is an American water polo player who competed for Stanford University. He participated in the men's water polo tournament at the 1992 Summer Olympics.

== Early life ==
Fischer was born March 12, 1966, to Curt and Pat Fischer in Dinuba, California and attended and played water polo for Reedley High School in Reedley, California, about 18 miles Southeast of Fresno. Erich's parents worked as schoolteachers, with mother Pat teaching at Dinuba's Lincoln Elementary and father Curt teaching at the College of the Sequoias. Fischer was competing in swimming by the age of eight, and already capturing high point awards in AAU age-group swimming championships.

== Reedley High School ==
Graduating Reedley High in 1984, where he was coached by Laure Gross, he competed in both water polo and swimming where he excelled in the 200 IM and 100 butterfly. During his high school years, Fischer was a High School All-American, an All-League player, and a team Captain as an upperclassman. As an accomplished student holding a 3.75 grade point average through his Junior year, he was a member of the California Scholastic Federation. In the summer of 1983, he was voted to the Northern California Junior National All-Star team. His parents were strong supporters of his sports career and would attend his 1992 Olympic debut. Erich is the father of two-time Olympic women's water polo gold medalists Aria and Mackenzie Fischer. As his age-group coach, Fischer credited Terry Giffen with much of his early water polo development. Accomplished coach Giffen coached water polo for Hoover and Clovis High Schools, and helped start the Clovis Water Polo Club with rival coach Steve Mosher.

== Stanford University ==
Erich Fischer played water polo for Stanford University under Hall of Fame Head Coach Dante Dettamanti where he earned All-American honors twice, and had a career total in goals scored of 197. He helped lead Stanford men's water polo to NCAA titles in both 1985 and 1986. Fischer majored in industrial engineering at Stanford.

== 1992 Barcelona Olympics ==
Fischer participated in the men's water polo tournament under Head Coach Bill Barnett at the August, 1992 Summer Olympics, where the U.S. team placed fourth. Fischer scored a goal in the preliminary U.S. game against Czechoslovakia, which led to a 9–3 win, and was credited with a total of seven goals in the seven games played by the U.S. Olympic team. In semi-final rounds, the U.S. lost to Spain in a disappointing 6–4 loss, but Fischer's strong defense was considered a major factor in shutting out Spain's top scorer Manual Estiarte, considered one of the game's top players in 1992. leaving Italy to play Spain in the final round, which became one of the longest matches in Olympic history, before Italy won 9–8. In the match for the bronze medal against the Unified team, the U.S. lost 8–4. Yugoslavia, though a pre-Olympic favorite was banned from participating due to a United Nations' sanction for their actions in the war between Croatia and Bosnia. Italy took the gold, Spain took the silver medal and the Unified Team took the bronze.

=== International highlights ===
After becoming a member of the U.S. National Team in 1989, at the 1991 World Cup, Fischer helped the U.S. team to a gold medal, where he was credited with the goal that clinched the gold in the final game. At the 1991 Pan American Games, he received a silver medal. He was with the U.S. national team at the 1991 World Championships, the World Cup in 1989, and the Goodwill Games in 1990.

Fischer coached his daughters Mackenzie and Aria in their youths with the Laguna Beach Water Polo Club.
