= South Africa women's national water polo team =

South Africa
- FINA code: RSA
- Association: Swimming South Africa
- Confederation: CANA (Africa)
- Head coach: Dean Whyte
- Asst coach: Masi Namba
- Captain: Shakira January
- Most caps: Megan Schooling
- Home venue: Kings Park

FINA ranking (since 2008)
- Current: 12 (as of 9 August 2021)
- Highest: 12 (2021)

Olympic Games
- Appearances: 1 (first in 2020)
- Best result: 10th place (2020)

World Championship
- Appearances: 10 (first in 2009)
- Best result: 14th place (2019)

World Cup
- Appearances: 2 (first in 2014)
- Best result: 7th place (2014)

Media
- Website: swimsa.org

The South Africa women's national water polo team represents the South Africa in international women's water polo competitions and friendly matches.

The team competed in the 2020 Olympics for the first time. The team also qualified for the 2024 Olympics, but was controversially withdrawn by Swimming South Africa for not being realistic medal contenders.

== Results ==
=== Olympic Games ===
- 2020 – 10th place
- 2024 – Withdrew

=== World Championship ===
- 2009 – 16th place
- 2011 – 15th place
- 2013 – 15th place
- 2015 – 16th place
- 2017 – 16th place
- 2019 – 14th place
- 2022 – 13th place
- 2023 – 12th place
- 2024 – 14th place
- 2025 – 15th place

=== World Cup ===
- 2014 – 7th place
- 2018 – 8th place

== Current squad ==
Roster for the 2025 World Championships.

Head coach: Dean Whyte

- 1 Lucy Davis GK
- 2 Tumi Macdonell FP
- 3 Tia Caswell FP
- 4 Boati Motau FP
- 5 Skye Murray FP
- 6 Mia Loizides FP
- 7 Shakira January FP
- 8 Esihle Zondo FP
- 9 Hannah Weppelman FP
- 10 Jo Williams FP
- 11 Chloe Meecham FP
- 12 Hannah Banks FP
- 13 Kyla Moolman GK
- 14 Georgia Eccles FP

== Under-20 team ==
South Africa lastly competed at the 2021 FINA Junior Water Polo World Championships.
