= Croatia at the 2024 World Aquatics Championships =

- Flag of Croatia
- FINA code: CRO
- National federation: Croatian Swimming Federation
- Website: www.hrvatski-plivacki-savez.hr (in Croatian)

in Doha, Qatar
- Competitors: 24 in 5 sports
- Medals Ranked 23rd: Gold 1 Silver 0 Bronze 0 Total 1

World Aquatics Championships appearances
- 1994; 1998; 2001; 2003; 2005; 2007; 2009; 2011; 2013; 2015; 2017; 2019; 2022; 2023; 2024

Other related appearances
- Yugoslavia (1973–1991)

Croatia competed at the 2024 World Aquatics Championships in Doha, Qatar from 2 to 18 February.

== Medalists ==
Medal	Name	Sport	Event	Date
1st place, gold medalist(s)	Croatia men's national water polo team: Marko Bijač (gk); Rino Burić; Loren Fatović; Luka Lončar; Franko Lazić; Matias Biljaka; Ante Vukičević; Marko Žuvela; Jerko Marinić Kragić; Josip Vrlić; Zvonimir Butić; Konstantin Kharkov; Mate Anić (gk); Ivan Krapić; Filip Kržić	Waterpolo	Men's tournament	17 February 2024

== Athletes by discipline ==
The following is the list of number of competitors participating at the Championships per discipline.

Sport	Men	Women	Total
Artistic swimming	0	1	1
Diving	2	0	2
Open water swimming	1	1	2
Swimming	2	2	4
Water polo	15	0	15
Total	20	4	24

== Artistic swimming ==
Croatia's artistic swimming team consisted of one athletes (women).

Women

Athlete	Event	Preliminaries		Final	
Athlete	Event	Points	Rank	Points	Rank
Matea Butorac	Solo free routine	170.9208	18	Did not advance	

== Diving ==
Croatia's diving team consisted of 2 athletes (both men).

Men

Athlete	Event	Preliminaries		Semifinal		Final	
Athlete	Event	Points	Rank	Points	Rank	Points	Rank
David Ledinski	1 m springboard	290.50	24	—		Did not advance	
David Ledinski	3 m springboard	252.65	60	Did not advance			
Matej Nevešćanin	3 m springboard	351.75	24	Did not advance			
David Ledinski; Matej Nevešćanin	3 m synchro springboard	—				333.48	15

== Open water swimming ==
Croatia's open water swimming team consisted of two athletes (men and women).

Men

Athlete	Event	Time	Rank
Marin Mogić	Men's 10 km	1:58:08.3	61

Women

Athlete	Event	Time	Rank
Klara Bošnjak	Women's 10 km	2:06:25.3	44

== Swimming ==
Croatia's swimming team consisted of 4 athletes (2 men and 2 women).

Men

Athlete	Event	Heat		Semifinal		Final	
Athlete	Event	Time	Rank	Time	Rank	Time	Rank
Nikola Miljenić	50 m freestyle	22.20	20	Did not advance			
Nikola Miljenić	50 m butterfly	23.41	12 Q	23.37	12	Did not advance	
Niko Janković	200 m freestyle	1:48.39	28	Did not advance			

Women

Athlete	Event	Heat		Semifinal		Final	
Athlete	Event	Time	Rank	Time	Rank	Time	Rank
Ana Blažević	100 m breaststroke	1:08.88	22	Did not advance			
Ana Blažević	200 m breaststroke	2:27.51	13 Q	2:28.48	14	Did not advance	
Amina Kajtaz	100 m butterfly	59.14	14 Q	59.22	16	Did not advance	
Amina Kajtaz	200 m butterfly	2:11.78	11 Q	2:13.14	15	Did not advance	

== Water polo ==
Summary

Team	Event	Group stage				Playoff	Quarterfinal	Semifinal	Final / BM	
Team	Event	Opposition Score	Opposition Score	Opposition Score	Rank	Opposition Score	Opposition Score	Opposition Score	Opposition Score	Rank
Croatia	Men's tournament	Australia; W 13–9	Spain; L 6–10	South Africa; W 29–6	2 QP	China; W 22–4	United States; W 15–13	France; W 11–11 (6–5 PSO)	Italy; W 11–11 (4–2 PSO)	1st place, gold medalist(s)

=== Men's tournament ===
Team roster

The following is the Croatian roster.

Head coach: Ivica Tucak

- 1 Marko Bijač GK
- 2 Rino Burić FP
- 3 Loren Fatović FP
- 4 Luka Lončar FP
- 5 Franko Lazić FP
- 6 Matias Biljaka FP
- 7 Ante Vukičević FP
- 8 Marko Žuvela FP
- 9 Jerko Marinić Kragić FP
- 10 Josip Vrlić FP
- 11 Zvonimir Butić FP
- 12 Konstantin Kharkov FP
- 13 Mate Anić GK
- 14 Ivan Krapić FP
- 15 Filip Kržić FP

Group play

Pos	Team	Pld	W	PSW	PSL	L	GF	GA	GD	Pts	Qualification
1	Spain	3	3	0	0	0	46	20	+26	9	Quarterfinals
2	Croatia	3	2	0	0	1	48	24	+24	6	Playoffs
3	Australia	3	1	0	0	2	46	35	+11	3	Playoffs
4	South Africa	3	0	0	0	3	18	79	−61	0	13–16th place semifinals

Source: World Aquatics
Rules for classification: 1) points; 2) head-to-head points; 3) head-to-head goal difference; 4) head-to-head number of goals scored; 5) Goal difference.

5 February 2024; 13:30	Report	Croatia	13–8	Australia	Aspire Dome, Doha; Referees: Michiel Zwart (NED), György Kun (HUN)
5 February 2024; 13:30	Report	Score by quarters: 5–1, 4–2, 2–2, 2–3			Aspire Dome, Doha; Referees: Michiel Zwart (NED), György Kun (HUN)
5 February 2024; 13:30	Report	six players 2	Goals	Berehulak, Pavillard 2	Aspire Dome, Doha; Referees: Michiel Zwart (NED), György Kun (HUN)

7 February 2024; 19:00	Report	Spain	10–6	Croatia	Aspire Dome, Doha; Referees: Boris Margeta (SLO), Darren Spiritosanto (USA)
7 February 2024; 19:00	Report	Score by quarters: 2–1, 3–2, 1–0, 4–3			Aspire Dome, Doha; Referees: Boris Margeta (SLO), Darren Spiritosanto (USA)
7 February 2024; 19:00	Report	Granados 3	Goals	Fatović 3	Aspire Dome, Doha; Referees: Boris Margeta (SLO), Darren Spiritosanto (USA)

9 February 2024; 16:00	Report	South Africa	6–29	Croatia	Aspire Dome, Doha; Referees: Ashleigh Kaeshler (AUS), Yuri Maciel (BRA)
9 February 2024; 16:00	Report	Score by quarters: 2–7, 1–7, 3–7, 0–8			Aspire Dome, Doha; Referees: Ashleigh Kaeshler (AUS), Yuri Maciel (BRA)
9 February 2024; 16:00	Report	Tucker 2	Goals	Marinić Kragić 5	Aspire Dome, Doha; Referees: Ashleigh Kaeshler (AUS), Yuri Maciel (BRA)

Playoffs

11 February 2024; 12:00	Report	Croatia	22–4	China	Aspire Dome, Doha; Referees: Sébastien Dervieux (FRA), Stanko Ivanovski (MNE)
11 February 2024; 12:00	Report	Score by quarters: 5–2, 5–1, 6–1, 6–0			Aspire Dome, Doha; Referees: Sébastien Dervieux (FRA), Stanko Ivanovski (MNE)
11 February 2024; 12:00	Report	Kharkov 4	Goals	four players 1	Aspire Dome, Doha; Referees: Sébastien Dervieux (FRA), Stanko Ivanovski (MNE)

Quarterfinals

13 February 2024; 19:00	Report	Serbia	13–15	Croatia	Aspire Dome, Doha; Referees: Georgios Stavridis (GRE), Frank Ohme (GER)
13 February 2024; 19:00	Report	Score by quarters: 4–4, 5–5, 1–2, 3–4			Aspire Dome, Doha; Referees: Georgios Stavridis (GRE), Frank Ohme (GER)
13 February 2024; 19:00	Report	S. Rašović 3	Goals	Fatović 4	Aspire Dome, Doha; Referees: Georgios Stavridis (GRE), Frank Ohme (GER)

Semifinals

15 February 2024; 17:30	Report	Croatia	17–16	France	Aspire Dome, Doha; Referees: Michiel Zwart (NED), Zhang Liang (CHN)
15 February 2024; 17:30	Report	Score by quarters: 3–2, 3–3, 3–1, 2–5 PSO: 6–5			Aspire Dome, Doha; Referees: Michiel Zwart (NED), Zhang Liang (CHN)
15 February 2024; 17:30	Report	Fatović 3	Goals	Bouet 3	Aspire Dome, Doha; Referees: Michiel Zwart (NED), Zhang Liang (CHN)

Final

17 February 2024; 17:30	Report	Italy	13–15	Croatia	Aspire Dome, Doha; Referees: Frank Ohme (GER), Sébastien Dervieux (FRA)
17 February 2024; 17:30	Report	Score by quarters: 3–2, 2–3, 2–3, 4–3 PSO: 2–4			Aspire Dome, Doha; Referees: Frank Ohme (GER), Sébastien Dervieux (FRA)
17 February 2024; 17:30	Report	Fondelli 5	Goals	Kharkov 4	Aspire Dome, Doha; Referees: Frank Ohme (GER), Sébastien Dervieux (FRA)
