= Water polo at the 2024 Summer Olympics =

Water polo at the Games of the XXXIII Olympiad
- Water polo pictogram for the 2024 Summer Olympics
- Venue: Paris Aquatic Centre (prelims phase); Paris La Défense Arena (final phase)
- Dates: 27 July – 11 August 2024
- No. of events: 2 (1 men, 1 women)
- Competitors: 286 from 15 nations

The water polo tournaments at the 2024 Summer Olympics in Paris were held from 27 July to 11 August. Preliminary water polo matches occurred at Paris Aquatic Centre, with the final playoffs staged at the iconic Paris La Défense Arena. Similar to the previous edition, twenty-two teams (twelve for men and ten for women) competed against each other in their respective tournaments.

== Qualification ==
The International Olympic Committee and World Aquatics (AQUA) had ratified and released the qualification criteria for Paris 2024. The host nation France reserved a direct quota place each in the men's and women's tournament with the remainder of the total quota attributed to the eligible NOCs through a tripartite qualification pathway.

The 2023 World Aquatics Championships in Fukuoka, Japan, produced the winners and runners-up of the men's and women's water polo tournament, qualifying for Paris 2024. Five further quota places were awarded to the highest-ranked eligible NOC at each of the continental meets (Africa, Americas, Asia, Europe, and Oceania) approved by World Aquatics. If any of the continental meets did not occur within the qualifying period, the vacant spot was entitled to the highest-ranked eligible NOC from a respective continent at the succeeding edition of the Worlds.

To complete the water polo roster for the Games, the final batch of quota places were assigned to the four highest-ranked eligible NOCs for men and two for women at the 2024 World Aquatics Championships in Doha, Qatar.

=== Qualification summary ===
Nation	Men's	Women's	Athletes
Australia	Yes	Yes	26
Canada	—N/a	Yes	13
China	—N/a	Yes	13
Croatia	Yes	—N/a	13
France	Yes	Yes	26
Greece	Yes	Yes	26
Hungary	Yes	Yes	26
Italy	Yes	Yes	26
Japan	Yes	—N/a	13
Montenegro	Yes	—N/a	13
Netherlands	—N/a	Yes	13
Romania	Yes	—N/a	13
Serbia	Yes	—N/a	13
Spain	Yes	Yes	26
United States	Yes	Yes	26
Total: 15 NOCs	156	130	286

=== Men's qualification ===
Qualification	Date	Host	Berths	Qualified team
Host country	—N/a		1	France
2023 World Aquatics Championships	17–29 July 2023	(Japan) Fukuoka	2	Hungary
2023 World Aquatics Championships	17–29 July 2023	(Japan) Fukuoka	2	Greece
2022 Asian Games	2–7 October 2023	(China) Hangzhou	1	Japan
2023 Pan American Games	30 October – 4 November 2023	(Chile) Santiago	1	United States
2024 European Championships	4–16 January 2024	(Croatia) Dubrovnik/Zagreb	1	Spain
2024 World Aquatics Championships	5–17 February 2024	(Qatar) Doha	4	Croatia
2024 World Aquatics Championships	5–17 February 2024	(Qatar) Doha	4	Italy
2024 World Aquatics Championships	5–17 February 2024	(Qatar) Doha	4	Serbia
2024 World Aquatics Championships	5–17 February 2024	(Qatar) Doha	4	Montenegro
2024 World Aquatics Championships – Africa	5–17 February 2024	(Qatar) Doha	~~1~~	~~South Africa~~
2024 World Aquatics Championships – Oceania	5–17 February 2024	(Qatar) Doha	1	Australia
2024 World Aquatics Championships – Reallocation	5–17 February 2024	(Qatar) Doha	1	Romania (Note: South Africa withdrew from the tournament after the 2024 World Aquatics Championships. Romania, as the best non-qualified team, took their spot.)
Total			12	

=== Women's qualification ===
Qualification	Date	Host	Berths	Qualified team
Host country	—N/a		1	France
2023 World Aquatics Championships	16–28 July 2023	(Japan) Fukuoka	2	Netherlands
2023 World Aquatics Championships	16–28 July 2023	(Japan) Fukuoka	2	Spain
2023 Oceanian Qualifier Series	11–12 August 2023	(New Zealand) Auckland	1	Australia
2022 Asian Games	25 September – 1 October 2023	(China) Hangzhou	1	China
2023 Pan American Games	30 October – 4 November 2023	(Chile) Santiago	1	United States
2024 European Championships	5–13 January 2024	(Netherlands) Eindhoven	1	Greece
2024 World Aquatics Championships	4–16 February 2024	(Qatar) Doha	2	Hungary
2024 World Aquatics Championships	4–16 February 2024	(Qatar) Doha	2	Italy
2024 World Aquatics Championships – Africa	4–16 February 2024	(Qatar) Doha	~~1~~	~~South Africa~~
2024 World Aquatics Championships – Reallocation	4–16 February 2024	(Qatar) Doha	1	Canada (Note: South Africa withdrew from the tournament after the 2024 World Aquatics Championships. Canada, as the best non-qualified team, took their spot.)
Total			10	

== Medal summary ==
=== Medal table ===
* Host nation (France)

Rank	NOC	Gold	Silver	Bronze	Total
1	Serbia	1	0	0	1
1	Spain	1	0	0	1
3	Australia	0	1	0	1
3	Croatia	0	1	0	1
5	Netherlands	0	0	1	1
5	United States	0	0	1	1
Totals (6 entries)		2	2	2	6

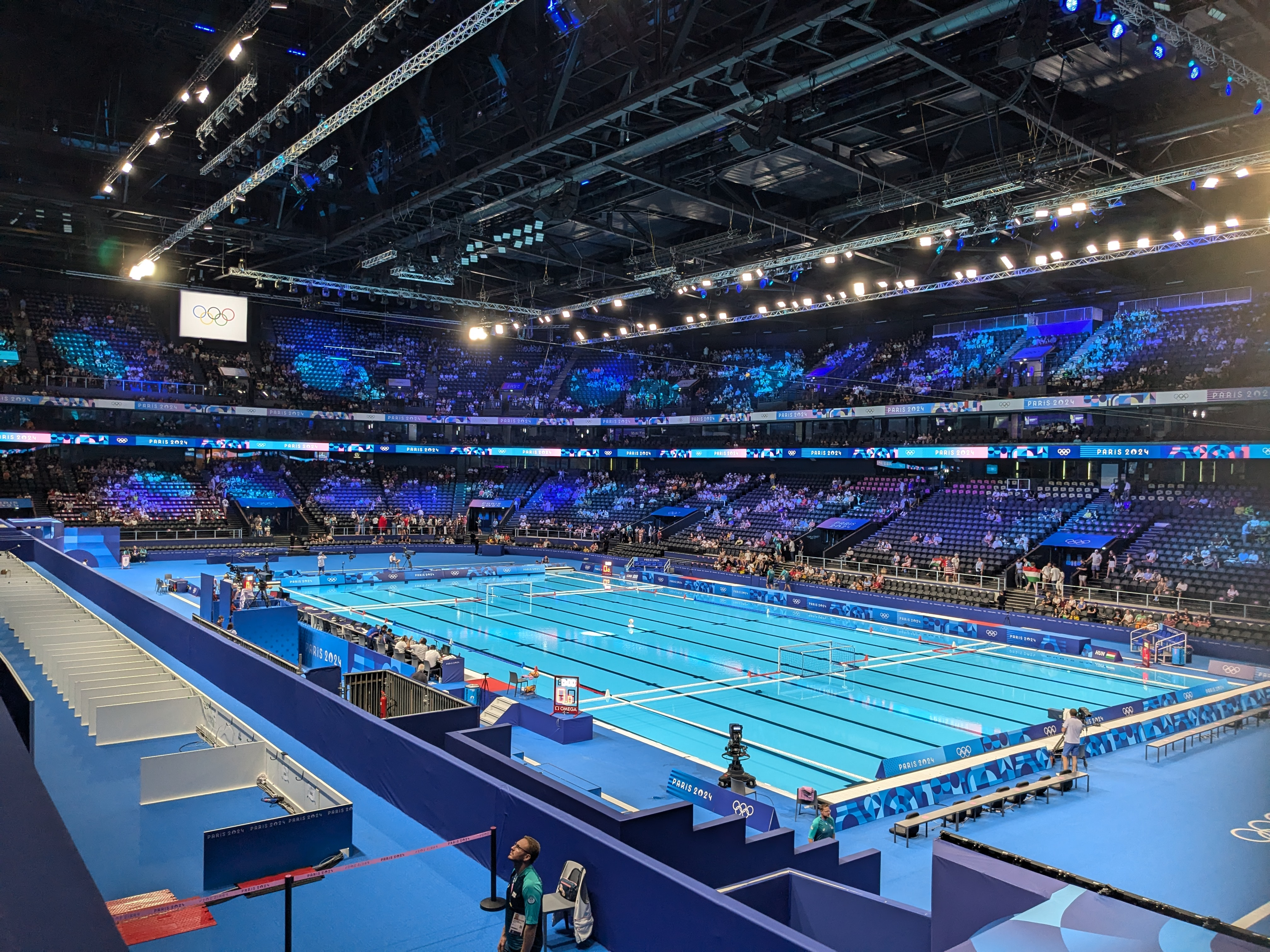
Paris La Défense Arena during the water polo competitions

=== Medalists ===
Event	Gold	Silver	Bronze
Men's tournament	Serbia; Radoslav Filipović; Dušan Mandić; Strahinja Rašović; Sava Ranđelović; Miloš Ćuk; Nikola Dedović; Radomir Drašović; Nikola Jakšić; Nemanja Ubović; Nemanja Vico; Petar Jakšić; Viktor Rašović; Vladimir Mišović	Croatia; Marko Bijač; Rino Burić; Loren Fatović; Luka Lončar; Maro Joković; Luka Bukić; Ante Vukičević; Marko Žuvela; Jerko Marinić Kragić; Josip Vrlić; Matias Biljaka; Konstantin Kharkov; Toni Popadić	United States; Alex Bowen; Luca Cupido; Hannes Daube; Chase Dodd; Ryder Dodd; Ben Hallock; Drew Holland; Johnny Hooper; Max Irving; Alex Obert; Marko Vavic; Adrian Weinberg; Dylan Woodhead
Women's tournament	Spain; Paula Camus; Paula Crespí; Anni Espar; Laura Ester; Judith Forca; Maica García Godoy; Paula Leitón; Beatriz Ortiz; Pili Peña; Nona Pérez; Isabel Piralkova; Elena Ruiz; Martina Terré	Australia; Abby Andrews; Charlize Andrews; Zoe Arancini; Elle Armit; Keesja Gofers; Sienna Green; Bronte Halligan; Sienna Hearn; Danijela Jackovich; Matilda Kearns; Genevieve Longman; Gabriella Palm; Alice Williams	Netherlands; Laura Aarts; Sarah Buis; Kitty-Lynn Joustra; Maartje Keuning; Lola Moolhuijzen; Bente Rogge; Lieke Rogge; Vivian Sevenich; Brigitte Sleeking; Nina ten Broek; Simone van de Kraats; Sabrina van der Sloot; Iris Wolves

== Men's tournament ==
=== Preliminary round ===
==== Group A ====
Pos	Team	Pld	W	PSW	PSL	L	GF	GA	GD	Pts	Qualification
1	Greece	5	3	1	0	1	61	52	+9	11 (Note: Greece 9–8 Italy)	Quarterfinals
2	Italy	5	3	1	0	1	60	43	+17	11	Quarterfinals
3	United States	5	3	0	0	2	59	51	+8	9 (Note: Croatia 11–14 United States)	Quarterfinals
4	Croatia	5	3	0	0	2	58	57	+1	9	Quarterfinals
5	Montenegro	5	1	0	2	2	45	50	−5	5	
6	Romania	5	0	0	0	5	37	67	−30	0	

Source: Olympics
Rules for classification: 1) Points; 2) Head-to-head points; 3) Head-to-head goal difference; 4) Head-to-head goals scored; 5) Goal difference.

==== Group B ====
Pos	Team	Pld	W	PSW	PSL	L	GF	GA	GD	Pts	Qualification
1	Spain	5	5	0	0	0	67	39	+28	15	Quarterfinals
2	Australia	5	3	0	0	2	44	42	+2	9 (Note: Australia 9–8 Hungary)	Quarterfinals
3	Hungary	5	3	0	0	2	62	54	+8	9	Quarterfinals
4	Serbia	5	2	0	0	3	58	63	−5	6	Quarterfinals
5	France (H)	5	1	0	0	4	50	60	−10	3 (Note: France 14–13 Japan)	
6	Japan	5	1	0	0	4	60	83	−23	3	

Source: Olympics
Rules for classification: 1) Points; 2) Head-to-head points; 3) Head-to-head goal difference; 4) Head-to-head goals scored; 5) Goal difference.
(H) Host

=== Knockout stage ===
Quarter-finals
7 August
Greece	11
Serbia	12
7 August
United States (PSO)	7 (4)
Australia	7 (3)
7 August
Italy	9 (1)
Hungary (PSO)	9 (3)
7 August
Croatia	10
Spain	8

Semi-finals
9 August
Serbia	10
United States	6
9 August
Hungary	8
Croatia	9

Gold medal
11 August
Serbia	13
Croatia	11
Bronze medal
11 August
United States (PSO)	8 (3)
Hungary	8 (0)

=== Final standings ===
Rank	Team
Gold medal	Serbia
Silver medal	Croatia
Bronze medal	United States
4	Hungary
5	Greece
6	Spain
7	Italy
8	Australia
9	Montenegro
10	France
11	Japan
12	Romania

== Women's tournament ==
=== Preliminary round ===
==== Group A ====
Pos	Team	Pld	W	PSW	PSL	L	GF	GA	GD	Pts	Qualification
1	Australia	4	2	2	0	0	33	28	+5	10 (Note: Netherlands 14–15 Australia)	Quarterfinals
2	Netherlands	4	3	0	1	0	52	37	+15	10	Quarterfinals
3	Hungary	4	2	0	1	1	46	37	+9	7	Quarterfinals
4	Canada	4	1	0	0	3	37	49	−12	3	Quarterfinals
5	China	4	0	0	0	4	34	51	−17	0	

Source: Olympics
Rules for classification: 1) Points; 2) Head-to-head points; 3) Head-to-head goal difference; 4) Head-to-head goals scored; 5) Goal difference.

==== Group B ====
Pos	Team	Pld	W	PSW	PSL	L	GF	GA	GD	Pts	Qualification
1	Spain	4	4	0	0	0	51	36	+15	12	Quarterfinals
2	United States	4	3	0	0	1	53	27	+26	9	Quarterfinals
3	Italy	4	1	0	0	3	34	40	−6	3 (Note: Greece 3 Pts, +3 GD; Italy 3 Pts, +3 GD; France 3 Pts, −6 GD. Italy ranked above Greece due to more goals scored.)	Quarterfinals
4	Greece	4	1	0	0	3	33	41	−8	3	Quarterfinals
5	France (H)	4	1	0	0	3	24	51	−27	3	

Source: Olympics
Rules for classification: 1) Points; 2) Head-to-head points; 3) Head-to-head goal difference; 4) Head-to-head goals scored; 5) Goal difference.
(H) Host

=== Knockout stage ===
Quarter-finals
6 August
Australia	9
Greece	6
6 August
Hungary	4
United States	5
6 August
Netherlands	11
Italy	8
6 August
Canada	8
Spain	18

Semi-finals
8 August
Australia (PSO)	8 (6)
United States	8 (5)
8 August
Netherlands	14 (4)
Spain (PSO)	14 (5)

Gold medal
10 August
(silver) Australia	9
(gold) Spain	11
Bronze medal
10 August
United States	10
(bronze) Netherlands	11

=== Final standings ===
Rank	Team
Gold medal	Spain
Silver medal	Australia
Bronze medal	Netherlands
4	United States
5	Hungary
6	Italy
7	Greece
8	Canada
9	France
10	China

== See also ==
- Water polo at the 2023 Pan American Games
