= Water polo at the 2024 World Aquatics Championships – Men's tournament =

Tournament details
- Host country: Qatar
- Venue: Aspire Dome (in 1 host city)
- Dates: 5–17 February
- Teams: 16 (from 5 confederations)

Final positions
- Champions: Croatia (3rd title)
- Runners-up: Italy
- Third place: Spain
- Fourth place: France

Tournament statistics
- Matches played: 48
- Goals scored: 1,163 (24.23 per match)

Awards
- Best goalkeeper: (Italy) Marco Del Lungo

The men's water polo tournament at the 2024 World Aquatics Championships was held from 5 to 17 February 2024 in Doha. This was the 21st time that the men's water polo tournament has been played since the first edition in 1973.

Croatia won their third title after a win over Italy.

== Qualification ==
Of the qualified teams, fourteen returned from 2023. Romania qualified for the first time in eleven years, while Brazil qualified after withdrawing from 2023. Canada and Argentina were the only teams that failed to make this edition but made 2023. As of 2025, this was the last time France, Kazakhstan qualified and the last time Canada and Singapore failed to qualify.

Event	Dates	Hosts	Quota	Qualifier(s)
2023 World Cup	8 March – 2 July 2023	(United States) Los Angeles	2	Spain; Italy
2023 World Championships	17–29 July 2023	(Japan) Fukuoka	4	Hungary; Greece; Serbia; France
2022 Asian Games	2–7 October 2023	(China) Hangzhou	3	Japan; China; Kazakhstan
2023 Pan American Games	30 October – 4 November 2023	(Chile) Santiago	2	United States; Brazil
2024 European Championship	4–16 January 2024	(Croatia) Dubrovnik/Zagreb	3	Croatia; Montenegro; Romania
African selection	—N/a	—N/a	1	South Africa
Oceanian selection	—N/a	—N/a	1	Australia
Total			16	

== Schedule ==
All times are local (UTC+3).

Date	Time	Round
5 February 2024	09:00	Preliminary round
7 February 2024	09:00	Preliminary round
9 February 2024	09:00	Preliminary round
11 February 2024	09:00	Play-offs/Placement matches
13 February 2024	09:00	Quarterfinals/Placement matches
15 February 2024	09:00	Semifinals/Placement matches
17 February 2024	10:00	Finals

== Draw ==
The draw was held on 7 November 2023.

=== Seeding ===
Pot 1	Pot 2	Pot 3	Pot 4
Hungary; Greece; Spain; Serbia	Italy; France; Croatia (Note: Team known as Europe 1 at the time of the draw.); United States	Montenegro (Note: Team known as Europe 2 at the time of the draw.); Romania (Note: Team known as Europe 3 at the time of the draw.); Brazil; Australia	Japan; China; Kazakhstan; South Africa

== Preliminary round ==
All times are local (UTC+3).

=== Group A ===
Pos	Team	Pld	W	PSW	PSL	L	GF	GA	GD	Pts	Qualification
1	Spain	3	3	0	0	0	46	20	+26	9	Quarterfinals
2	Croatia	3	2	0	0	1	48	24	+24	6	Playoffs
3	Australia	3	1	0	0	2	46	35	+11	3	Playoffs
4	South Africa	3	0	0	0	3	18	79	−61	0	13–16th place semifinals

Source: World Aquatics
Rules for classification: 1) points; 2) head-to-head points; 3) head-to-head goal difference; 4) head-to-head number of goals scored; 5) Goal difference.

5 February 2024; 09:00	Report	South Africa	5–21	Spain	Aspire Dome, Doha; Referees: Viktor Salnichenko (KAZ), Cheng Beng Guan (SGP)
5 February 2024; 09:00	Report	Score by quarters: 1–6, 0–7, 0–4, 4–4			Aspire Dome, Doha; Referees: Viktor Salnichenko (KAZ), Cheng Beng Guan (SGP)
5 February 2024; 09:00	Report	Van Zyl 3	Goals	Biel, Granados 4	Aspire Dome, Doha; Referees: Viktor Salnichenko (KAZ), Cheng Beng Guan (SGP)

5 February 2024; 13:30	Report	Croatia	13–8	Australia	Aspire Dome, Doha; Referees: Michiel Zwart (NED), György Kun (HUN)
5 February 2024; 13:30	Report	Score by quarters: 5–1, 4–2, 2–2, 2–3			Aspire Dome, Doha; Referees: Michiel Zwart (NED), György Kun (HUN)
5 February 2024; 13:30	Report	six players 2	Goals	Berehulak, Pavillard 2	Aspire Dome, Doha; Referees: Michiel Zwart (NED), György Kun (HUN)

7 February 2024; 13:30	Report	Australia	29–7	South Africa	Aspire Dome, Doha; Referees: David Couper (NZL), Cheng Beng Guan (SGP)
7 February 2024; 13:30	Report	Score by quarters: 6–2, 8–1, 7–1, 8–3			Aspire Dome, Doha; Referees: David Couper (NZL), Cheng Beng Guan (SGP)
7 February 2024; 13:30	Report	Edwards 6	Goals	Stone 2	Aspire Dome, Doha; Referees: David Couper (NZL), Cheng Beng Guan (SGP)

7 February 2024; 19:00	Report	Spain	10–6	Croatia	Aspire Dome, Doha; Referees: Boris Margeta (SLO), Darren Spiritosanto (USA)
7 February 2024; 19:00	Report	Score by quarters: 2–1, 3–2, 1–0, 4–3			Aspire Dome, Doha; Referees: Boris Margeta (SLO), Darren Spiritosanto (USA)
7 February 2024; 19:00	Report	Granados 3	Goals	Fatović 3	Aspire Dome, Doha; Referees: Boris Margeta (SLO), Darren Spiritosanto (USA)

9 February 2024; 13:30	Report	Australia	9–15	Spain	Aspire Dome, Doha; Referees: György Kun (HUN), Darren Spiritosanto (USA)
9 February 2024; 13:30	Report	Score by quarters: 2–4, 3–2, 2–4, 2–5			Aspire Dome, Doha; Referees: György Kun (HUN), Darren Spiritosanto (USA)
9 February 2024; 13:30	Report	Mercep 3	Goals	three players 3	Aspire Dome, Doha; Referees: György Kun (HUN), Darren Spiritosanto (USA)

9 February 2024; 16:00	Report	South Africa	6–29	Croatia	Aspire Dome, Doha; Referees: Ashleigh Kaeshler (AUS), Yuri Maciel (BRA)
9 February 2024; 16:00	Report	Score by quarters: 2–7, 1–7, 3–7, 0–8			Aspire Dome, Doha; Referees: Ashleigh Kaeshler (AUS), Yuri Maciel (BRA)
9 February 2024; 16:00	Report	Tucker 2	Goals	Marinić Kragić 5	Aspire Dome, Doha; Referees: Ashleigh Kaeshler (AUS), Yuri Maciel (BRA)

=== Group B ===
Pos	Team	Pld	W	PSW	PSL	L	GF	GA	GD	Pts	Qualification
1	Greece	3	3	0	0	0	60	22	+38	9	Quarterfinals
2	France	3	2	0	0	1	44	33	+11	6	Playoffs
3	China	3	1	0	0	2	25	48	−23	3	Playoffs
4	Brazil	3	0	0	0	3	23	49	−26	0	13–16th place semifinals

Source: World Aquatics
Rules for classification: 1) points; 2) head-to-head points; 3) head-to-head goal difference; 4) head-to-head number of goals scored; 5) Goal difference.

5 February 2024; 10:30	Report	China	6–24	Greece	Aspire Dome, Doha; Referees: Alessandro Severo (ITA), Stanko Ivanovski (MNE)
5 February 2024; 10:30	Report	Score by quarters: 1–4, 0–6, 3–7, 2–7			Aspire Dome, Doha; Referees: Alessandro Severo (ITA), Stanko Ivanovski (MNE)
5 February 2024; 10:30	Report	Xie 2	Goals	Genidounias 5	Aspire Dome, Doha; Referees: Alessandro Severo (ITA), Stanko Ivanovski (MNE)

5 February 2024; 12:00	Report	Brazil	11–16	France	Aspire Dome, Doha; Referees: Darren Spiritosanto (USA), Andreia Stanojević (SRB)
5 February 2024; 12:00	Report	Score by quarters: 1–3, 4–5, 3–4, 3–4			Aspire Dome, Doha; Referees: Darren Spiritosanto (USA), Andreia Stanojević (SRB)
5 February 2024; 12:00	Report	R. Real 5	Goals	Vernoux 6	Aspire Dome, Doha; Referees: Darren Spiritosanto (USA), Andreia Stanojević (SRB)

7 February 2024; 09:00	Report	France	16–9	China	Aspire Dome, Doha; Referees: Stanko Ivanovski (MNE), Andreia Stanojević (SRB)
7 February 2024; 09:00	Report	Score by quarters: 3–3, 4–2, 2–1, 7–3			Aspire Dome, Doha; Referees: Stanko Ivanovski (MNE), Andreia Stanojević (SRB)
7 February 2024; 09:00	Report	Vernoux 6	Goals	Chen Z. 3	Aspire Dome, Doha; Referees: Stanko Ivanovski (MNE), Andreia Stanojević (SRB)

7 February 2024; 10:30	Report	Greece	23–4	Brazil	Aspire Dome, Doha; Referees: György Kun (HUN), Alessandro Severo (ITA)
7 February 2024; 10:30	Report	Score by quarters: 6–3, 4–0, 6–0, 7–1			Aspire Dome, Doha; Referees: György Kun (HUN), Alessandro Severo (ITA)
7 February 2024; 10:30	Report	Fountoulis 4	Goals	Pires 2	Aspire Dome, Doha; Referees: György Kun (HUN), Alessandro Severo (ITA)

9 February 2024; 19:00	Report	Greece	13–12	France	Aspire Dome, Doha; Referees: Andrej Franulović (CRO), Zhang Liang (CHN)
9 February 2024; 19:00	Report	Score by quarters: 3–3, 4–3, 3–2, 3–4			Aspire Dome, Doha; Referees: Andrej Franulović (CRO), Zhang Liang (CHN)
9 February 2024; 19:00	Report	four players 2	Goals	Marion-Vernoux 4	Aspire Dome, Doha; Referees: Andrej Franulović (CRO), Zhang Liang (CHN)

9 February 2024; 20:30	Report	Brazil	8–10	China	Aspire Dome, Doha; Referees: Alessandro Severo (ITA), David Couper (NZL)
9 February 2024; 20:30	Report	Score by quarters: 3–2, 2–1, 1–3, 2–4			Aspire Dome, Doha; Referees: Alessandro Severo (ITA), David Couper (NZL)
9 February 2024; 20:30	Report	Freitas 3	Goals	Chen Z. 3	Aspire Dome, Doha; Referees: Alessandro Severo (ITA), David Couper (NZL)

=== Group C ===
Pos	Team	Pld	W	PSW	PSL	L	GF	GA	GD	Pts	Qualification
1	Serbia	3	3	0	0	0	45	28	+17	9	Quarterfinals
2	Montenegro	3	1	1	0	1	30	36	−6	5	Playoffs
3	United States	3	1	0	1	1	41	30	+11	4	Playoffs
4	Japan	3	0	0	0	3	26	48	−22	0	13–16th place semifinals

Source: World Aquatics
Rules for classification: 1) points; 2) head-to-head points; 3) head-to-head goal difference; 4) head-to-head number of goals scored; 5) Goal difference.

5 February 2024; 16:00	Report	Japan	10–17	Serbia	Aspire Dome, Doha; Referees: Georgios Stavridis (GRE), Andrej Franulović (CRO)
5 February 2024; 16:00	Report	Score by quarters: 3–4, 4–4, 1–5, 2–4			Aspire Dome, Doha; Referees: Georgios Stavridis (GRE), Andrej Franulović (CRO)
5 February 2024; 16:00	Report	three players 2	Goals	Jakšić 4	Aspire Dome, Doha; Referees: Georgios Stavridis (GRE), Andrej Franulović (CRO)

5 February 2024; 17:30	Report	Montenegro	16–15 (PSO)	United States	Aspire Dome, Doha; Referees: Boris Margeta (SLO), Frank Ohme (GER)
5 February 2024; 17:30	Report	Score by quarters: 3–1, 2–3, 4–3, 2–4 PSO: 5–4			Aspire Dome, Doha; Referees: Boris Margeta (SLO), Frank Ohme (GER)
5 February 2024; 17:30	Report	three players 2	Goals	Bowen 5	Aspire Dome, Doha; Referees: Boris Margeta (SLO), Frank Ohme (GER)

7 February 2024; 12:00	Report	United States	18–5	Japan	Aspire Dome, Doha; Referees: Xavi Buch (ESP), Sébastien Dervieux (FRA)
7 February 2024; 12:00	Report	Score by quarters: 4–1, 4–0, 4–2, 6–2			Aspire Dome, Doha; Referees: Xavi Buch (ESP), Sébastien Dervieux (FRA)
7 February 2024; 12:00	Report	Hooper 6	Goals	Ogihara 2	Aspire Dome, Doha; Referees: Xavi Buch (ESP), Sébastien Dervieux (FRA)

7 February 2024; 17:30	Report	Serbia	14–6	Montenegro	Aspire Dome, Doha; Referees: Michiel Zwart (NED), Andrej Franulović (CRO)
7 February 2024; 17:30	Report	Score by quarters: 4–1, 2–2, 5–3, 3–0			Aspire Dome, Doha; Referees: Michiel Zwart (NED), Andrej Franulović (CRO)
7 February 2024; 17:30	Report	Mandić 4	Goals	six players 1	Aspire Dome, Doha; Referees: Michiel Zwart (NED), Andrej Franulović (CRO)

9 February 2024; 09:00	Report	Montenegro	13–11	Japan	Aspire Dome, Doha; Referees: Michiel Zwart (NED), Frank Ohme (GER)
9 February 2024; 09:00	Report	Score by quarters: 3–2, 2–3, 4–0, 4–6			Aspire Dome, Doha; Referees: Michiel Zwart (NED), Frank Ohme (GER)
9 February 2024; 09:00	Report	Matković 4	Goals	Watanabe 5	Aspire Dome, Doha; Referees: Michiel Zwart (NED), Frank Ohme (GER)

9 February 2024; 17:30	Report	Serbia	14–12	United States	Aspire Dome, Doha; Referees: Boris Margeta (SLO), Georgios Stavridis (GRE)
9 February 2024; 17:30	Report	Score by quarters: 2–3, 3–4, 6–1, 3–4			Aspire Dome, Doha; Referees: Boris Margeta (SLO), Georgios Stavridis (GRE)
9 February 2024; 17:30	Report	three players 3	Goals	Daube 4	Aspire Dome, Doha; Referees: Boris Margeta (SLO), Georgios Stavridis (GRE)

=== Group D ===
Pos	Team	Pld	W	PSW	PSL	L	GF	GA	GD	Pts	Qualification
1	Hungary	3	2	1	0	0	52	18	+34	8	Quarterfinals
2	Italy	3	2	0	1	0	58	22	+36	7	Playoffs
3	Romania	3	1	0	0	2	43	34	+9	3	Playoffs
4	Kazakhstan	3	0	0	0	3	7	86	−79	0	13–16th place semifinals

Source: World Aquatics
Rules for classification: 1) points; 2) head-to-head points; 3) head-to-head goal difference; 4) head-to-head number of goals scored; 5) Goal difference.

5 February 2024; 19:00	Report	Italy	33–3	Kazakhstan	Aspire Dome, Doha; Referees: Zhang Liang (CHN), Matan Schwartz (ISR)
5 February 2024; 19:00	Report	Score by quarters: 6–1, 10–1, 8–1, 9–0			Aspire Dome, Doha; Referees: Zhang Liang (CHN), Matan Schwartz (ISR)
5 February 2024; 19:00	Report	Cannella, Fondelli 7	Goals	three players 1	Aspire Dome, Doha; Referees: Zhang Liang (CHN), Matan Schwartz (ISR)

5 February 2024; 20:30	Report	Romania	8–15	Hungary	Aspire Dome, Doha; Referees: Xavi Buch (ESP), Sébastien Dervieux (FRA)
5 February 2024; 20:30	Report	Score by quarters: 2–5, 2–5, 3–2, 1–3			Aspire Dome, Doha; Referees: Xavi Buch (ESP), Sébastien Dervieux (FRA)
5 February 2024; 20:30	Report	Fulea, Georgescu 2	Goals	Vámos, Zalánki 3	Aspire Dome, Doha; Referees: Xavi Buch (ESP), Sébastien Dervieux (FRA)

7 February 2024; 16:00	Report	Kazakhstan	3–25	Romania	Aspire Dome, Doha; Referees: Zhang Liang (CHN), Matan Schwartz (ISR)
7 February 2024; 16:00	Report	Score by quarters: 1–7, 1–6, 0–5, 1–7			Aspire Dome, Doha; Referees: Zhang Liang (CHN), Matan Schwartz (ISR)
7 February 2024; 16:00	Report	three players 1	Goals	Fulea, Prioteasa 5	Aspire Dome, Doha; Referees: Zhang Liang (CHN), Matan Schwartz (ISR)

7 February 2024; 20:30	Report	Hungary	15–14 (PSO)	Italy	Aspire Dome, Doha; Referees: Georgios Stavridis (GRE), Frank Ohme (GER)
7 February 2024; 20:30	Report	Score by quarters: 2–2, 2–2, 3–3, 2–2 PSO: 6–5			Aspire Dome, Doha; Referees: Georgios Stavridis (GRE), Frank Ohme (GER)
7 February 2024; 20:30	Report	three players 2	Goals	Di Fulvio 3	Aspire Dome, Doha; Referees: Georgios Stavridis (GRE), Frank Ohme (GER)

9 February 2024; 10:30	Report	Kazakhstan	1–28	Hungary	Aspire Dome, Doha; Referees: Hélène Painchaud (CAN), Cheng Beng Guan (SGP)
9 February 2024; 10:30	Report	Score by quarters: 0–8, 0–5, 0–8, 1–7			Aspire Dome, Doha; Referees: Hélène Painchaud (CAN), Cheng Beng Guan (SGP)
9 February 2024; 10:30	Report	Yeremin 1	Goals	Vigvári 5	Aspire Dome, Doha; Referees: Hélène Painchaud (CAN), Cheng Beng Guan (SGP)

9 February 2024; 12:00	Report	Romania	10–16	Italy	Aspire Dome, Doha; Referees: Sébastien Dervieux (FRA), Lucas Letshabo (RSA)
9 February 2024; 12:00	Report	Score by quarters: 3–4, 4–4, 2–5, 1–3			Aspire Dome, Doha; Referees: Sébastien Dervieux (FRA), Lucas Letshabo (RSA)
9 February 2024; 12:00	Report	Georgescu 3	Goals	Di Fulvio 5	Aspire Dome, Doha; Referees: Sébastien Dervieux (FRA), Lucas Letshabo (RSA)

== Knockout stage ==
=== Bracket ===
Championship bracket

Playoffs
11 February
Montenegro	12
Romania	9
11 February
United States	12
Italy	13
11 February
Croatia	22
China	4
11 February
Australia	8
France	11

Quarter-finals
13 February
Spain	15
Montenegro	12
13 February
Greece	10
Italy	11
13 February
Serbia	13
Croatia	15
13 February
Hungary	10
France	11

Semi-finals
15 February
Spain	6
Italy	8
15 February
Croatia	11 (6)
France	11 (5)

Final
17 February
Italy	11 (2)
Croatia (PSO)	11 (4)
Third place
17 February
Spain	14
France	10

5th place bracket

5th–8th place semifinals
15 February
Montenegro	10 (3)
Greece (PSO)	10 (4)
15 February
Serbia	11
Hungary	10

Fifth place game
17 February
Greece	15
Serbia	11
Seventh place game
17 February
Montenegro	14 (2)
Hungary (PSO)	14 (4)

9th place bracket

9th–12th place semifinals
13 February
China	7
Romania	9
13 February
Australia	10
United States	16

Ninth place game
15 February
Romania	9
United States	13
Eleventh place game
15 February
China	7
Australia	17

13th place bracket

13th–16th place semifinals
11 February
South Africa	5
Brazil	18
11 February
Japan	17
Kazakhstan	4

13th place game
13 February
Brazil	11
Japan	22
15th place game
13 February
South Africa	11
Kazakhstan	10

=== Playoffs ===
11 February 2024; 12:00	Report	Croatia	22–4	China	Aspire Dome, Doha; Referees: Sébastien Dervieux (FRA), Stanko Ivanovski (MNE)
11 February 2024; 12:00	Report	Score by quarters: 5–2, 5–1, 6–1, 6–0			Aspire Dome, Doha; Referees: Sébastien Dervieux (FRA), Stanko Ivanovski (MNE)
11 February 2024; 12:00	Report	Kharkov 4	Goals	four players 1	Aspire Dome, Doha; Referees: Sébastien Dervieux (FRA), Stanko Ivanovski (MNE)

11 February 2024; 16:00	Report	Australia	8–11	France	Aspire Dome, Doha; Referees: Frank Ohme (GER), Andreia Stanojević (SRB)
11 February 2024; 16:00	Report	Score by quarters: 3–2, 3–4, 1–2, 1–3			Aspire Dome, Doha; Referees: Frank Ohme (GER), Andreia Stanojević (SRB)
11 February 2024; 16:00	Report	Maksimović 2	Goals	Bouet 4	Aspire Dome, Doha; Referees: Frank Ohme (GER), Andreia Stanojević (SRB)

11 February 2024; 17:30	Report	Montenegro	12–9	Romania	Aspire Dome, Doha; Referees: György Kun (HUN), Alessandro Severo (ITA)
11 February 2024; 17:30	Report	Score by quarters: 3–5, 4–1, 2–2, 3–1			Aspire Dome, Doha; Referees: György Kun (HUN), Alessandro Severo (ITA)
11 February 2024; 17:30	Report	Averka, Perković 3	Goals	Fulea 3	Aspire Dome, Doha; Referees: György Kun (HUN), Alessandro Severo (ITA)

11 February 2024; 19:00	Report	United States	12–13	Italy	Aspire Dome, Doha; Referees: Xavi Buch (ESP), Michiel Zwart (NED)
11 February 2024; 19:00	Report	Score by quarters: 3–3, 1–3, 4–4, 4–3			Aspire Dome, Doha; Referees: Xavi Buch (ESP), Michiel Zwart (NED)
11 February 2024; 19:00	Report	Daube 4	Goals	Di Fulvio, Fondelli 3	Aspire Dome, Doha; Referees: Xavi Buch (ESP), Michiel Zwart (NED)

=== Quarterfinals ===
13 February 2024; 16:00	Report	Spain	15–12	Montenegro	Aspire Dome, Doha; Referees: Michiel Zwart (NED), Andrej Franulović (CRO)
13 February 2024; 16:00	Report	Score by quarters: 5–2, 3–5, 5–0, 2–5			Aspire Dome, Doha; Referees: Michiel Zwart (NED), Andrej Franulović (CRO)
13 February 2024; 16:00	Report	Perrone 5	Goals	Mršić 4	Aspire Dome, Doha; Referees: Michiel Zwart (NED), Andrej Franulović (CRO)

13 February 2024; 17:30	Report	Greece	10–11	Italy	Aspire Dome, Doha; Referees: Boris Margeta (SLO), Sébastien Dervieux (FRA)
13 February 2024; 17:30	Report	Score by quarters: 3–1, 2–5, 3–2, 2–3			Aspire Dome, Doha; Referees: Boris Margeta (SLO), Sébastien Dervieux (FRA)
13 February 2024; 17:30	Report	Genidounias 3	Goals	three players 2	Aspire Dome, Doha; Referees: Boris Margeta (SLO), Sébastien Dervieux (FRA)

13 February 2024; 19:00	Report	Serbia	13–15	Croatia	Aspire Dome, Doha; Referees: Georgios Stavridis (GRE), Frank Ohme (GER)
13 February 2024; 19:00	Report	Score by quarters: 4–4, 5–5, 1–2, 3–4			Aspire Dome, Doha; Referees: Georgios Stavridis (GRE), Frank Ohme (GER)
13 February 2024; 19:00	Report	S. Rašović 3	Goals	Fatović 4	Aspire Dome, Doha; Referees: Georgios Stavridis (GRE), Frank Ohme (GER)

13 February 2024; 20:30	Report	Hungary	10–11	France	Aspire Dome, Doha; Referees: Xavi Buch (ESP), Darren Spiritosanto (USA)
13 February 2024; 20:30	Report	Score by quarters: 4–2, 3–1, 1–3, 2–5			Aspire Dome, Doha; Referees: Xavi Buch (ESP), Darren Spiritosanto (USA)
13 February 2024; 20:30	Report	Zalánki 3	Goals	Vernoux 5	Aspire Dome, Doha; Referees: Xavi Buch (ESP), Darren Spiritosanto (USA)

=== 13–16th place semifinals ===
11 February 2024; 09:00	Report	South Africa	5–18	Brazil	Aspire Dome, Doha; Referees: Matan Schwartz (ISR), Giuliana Nicolosi (ITA)
11 February 2024; 09:00	Report	Score by quarters: 4–5, 0–4, 0–3, 1–6			Aspire Dome, Doha; Referees: Matan Schwartz (ISR), Giuliana Nicolosi (ITA)
11 February 2024; 09:00	Report	Howard 2	Goals	Freitas, R. Real 4	Aspire Dome, Doha; Referees: Matan Schwartz (ISR), Giuliana Nicolosi (ITA)

11 February 2024; 10:30	Report	Japan	17–4	Kazakhstan	Aspire Dome, Doha; Referees: Natalia Markopoulou (GRE), Jennifer McCall (USA)
11 February 2024; 10:30	Report	Score by quarters: 3–2, 5–0, 5–2, 4–0			Aspire Dome, Doha; Referees: Natalia Markopoulou (GRE), Jennifer McCall (USA)
11 February 2024; 10:30	Report	Inaba 3	Goals	four players 1	Aspire Dome, Doha; Referees: Natalia Markopoulou (GRE), Jennifer McCall (USA)

=== 9–12th place semifinals ===
13 February 2024; 12:00	Report	China	7–9	Romania	Aspire Dome, Doha; Referees: György Kun (HUN), Andreia Stanojević (SRB)
13 February 2024; 12:00	Report	Score by quarters: 2–1, 2–2, 1–4, 2–2			Aspire Dome, Doha; Referees: György Kun (HUN), Andreia Stanojević (SRB)
13 February 2024; 12:00	Report	Chen Z., Zhang C. 3	Goals	Georgescu 3	Aspire Dome, Doha; Referees: György Kun (HUN), Andreia Stanojević (SRB)

13 February 2024; 13:30	Report	Australia	10–16	United States	Aspire Dome, Doha; Referees: Alessandro Severo (ITA), Stanko Ivanovski (MNE)
13 February 2024; 13:30	Report	Score by quarters: 3–4, 4–5, 1–3, 2–4			Aspire Dome, Doha; Referees: Alessandro Severo (ITA), Stanko Ivanovski (MNE)
13 February 2024; 13:30	Report	Pavillard 6	Goals	Bowen, Woodhead 3	Aspire Dome, Doha; Referees: Alessandro Severo (ITA), Stanko Ivanovski (MNE)

=== 5–8th place semifinals ===
15 February 2024; 12:00	Report	Montenegro	13–14 (PSO)	Greece	Aspire Dome, Doha; Referees: Alessandro Severo (ITA), Xavi Buch (ESP)
15 February 2024; 12:00	Report	Score by quarters: 2–2, 3–4, 1–2, 4–2 PSO: 3–4			Aspire Dome, Doha; Referees: Alessandro Severo (ITA), Xavi Buch (ESP)
15 February 2024; 12:00	Report	Đ. Radović 3	Goals	Kakaris 3	Aspire Dome, Doha; Referees: Alessandro Severo (ITA), Xavi Buch (ESP)

15 February 2024; 14:30	Report	Serbia	11–10	Hungary	Aspire Dome, Doha; Referees: Andrei Franulovic (CRO), Darren Spiritosanto (USA)
15 February 2024; 14:30	Report	Score by quarters: 5–2, 2–5, 2–1, 2–2			Aspire Dome, Doha; Referees: Andrei Franulovic (CRO), Darren Spiritosanto (USA)
15 February 2024; 14:30	Report	S. Rašović 3	Goals	Zalánki 3	Aspire Dome, Doha; Referees: Andrei Franulovic (CRO), Darren Spiritosanto (USA)

=== Semifinals ===
15 February 2024; 16:00	Report	Spain	6–8	Italy	Aspire Dome, Doha; Referees: Boris Margeta (SLO), György Kun (HUN)
15 February 2024; 16:00	Report	Score by quarters: 1–1, 1–3, 1–2, 3–2			Aspire Dome, Doha; Referees: Boris Margeta (SLO), György Kun (HUN)
15 February 2024; 16:00	Report	Larumbe, Munárriz 2	Goals	three players 2	Aspire Dome, Doha; Referees: Boris Margeta (SLO), György Kun (HUN)

15 February 2024; 17:30	Report	Croatia	17–16 (PSO)	France	Aspire Dome, Doha; Referees: Michiel Zwart (NED), Zhang Liang (CHN)
15 February 2024; 17:30	Report	Score by quarters: 3–2, 3–3, 3–1, 2–5 PSO: 6–5			Aspire Dome, Doha; Referees: Michiel Zwart (NED), Zhang Liang (CHN)
15 February 2024; 17:30	Report	Fatović 3	Goals	Bouet 3	Aspire Dome, Doha; Referees: Michiel Zwart (NED), Zhang Liang (CHN)

=== 15th place game ===
13 February 2024; 09:00	Report	South Africa	11–10	Kazakhstan	Aspire Dome, Doha; Referees: David Couper (NZL), Asumi Tsuzaki (JPN)
13 February 2024; 09:00	Report	Score by quarters: 3–0, 4–3, 1–4, 3–3			Aspire Dome, Doha; Referees: David Couper (NZL), Asumi Tsuzaki (JPN)
13 February 2024; 09:00	Report	Swanepoel 4	Goals	Akhmetov 3	Aspire Dome, Doha; Referees: David Couper (NZL), Asumi Tsuzaki (JPN)

=== 13th place game ===
13 February 2024; 10:30	Report	Brazil	11–22	Japan	Aspire Dome, Doha; Referees: Zhang Liang (CHN), Nóra Debreceni (HUN)
13 February 2024; 10:30	Report	Score by quarters: 4–6, 2–5, 3–5, 2–6			Aspire Dome, Doha; Referees: Zhang Liang (CHN), Nóra Debreceni (HUN)
13 February 2024; 10:30	Report	R. Real 3	Goals	Inaba 7	Aspire Dome, Doha; Referees: Zhang Liang (CHN), Nóra Debreceni (HUN)

=== Eleventh place game ===
15 February 2024; 09:00	Report	China	7–17	Australia	Aspire Dome, Doha; Referees: Andreia Stanojević (SRB), Hélène Painchaud (CAN)
15 February 2024; 09:00	Report	Score by quarters: 2–8, 0–4, 1–4, 4–1			Aspire Dome, Doha; Referees: Andreia Stanojević (SRB), Hélène Painchaud (CAN)
15 February 2024; 09:00	Report	Chen Z. 3	Goals	Maksimović, Mercep 4	Aspire Dome, Doha; Referees: Andreia Stanojević (SRB), Hélène Painchaud (CAN)

=== Ninth place game ===
15 February 2024; 10:30	Report	Romania	9–13	United States	Aspire Dome, Doha; Referees: Stanko Ivanovski (MNE), David Couper (NZL)
15 February 2024; 10:30	Report	Score by quarters: 2–5, 2–2, 4–3, 1–3			Aspire Dome, Doha; Referees: Stanko Ivanovski (MNE), David Couper (NZL)
15 February 2024; 10:30	Report	Georgescu 4	Goals	Bowen, Irving 3	Aspire Dome, Doha; Referees: Stanko Ivanovski (MNE), David Couper (NZL)

=== Seventh place game ===
17 February 2024; 10:00	Report	Montenegro	16–18 (PSO)	Hungary	Aspire Dome, Doha; Referees: Alessandro Severo (ITA), Andreia Stanojević (SRB)
17 February 2024; 10:00	Report	Score by quarters: 3–4, 3–2, 3–3, 5–5 PSO: 2–4			Aspire Dome, Doha; Referees: Alessandro Severo (ITA), Andreia Stanojević (SRB)
17 February 2024; 10:00	Report	Vujović 4	Goals	Zalánki 4	Aspire Dome, Doha; Referees: Alessandro Severo (ITA), Andreia Stanojević (SRB)

=== Fifth place game ===
17 February 2024; 16:00	Report	Greece	15–11	Serbia	Aspire Dome, Doha; Referees: Andrei Franulovic (CRO), Matan Schwartz (ISR)
17 February 2024; 16:00	Report	Score by quarters: 5–2, 3–3, 2–4, 5–2			Aspire Dome, Doha; Referees: Andrei Franulovic (CRO), Matan Schwartz (ISR)
17 February 2024; 16:00	Report	Gkiouvetsis, Kakaris 3	Goals	Drašović 3	Aspire Dome, Doha; Referees: Andrei Franulovic (CRO), Matan Schwartz (ISR)

=== Third place game ===
17 February 2024; 11:30	Report	Spain	14–10	France	Aspire Dome, Doha; Referees: György Kun (HUN), Darren Spiritosanto (USA)
17 February 2024; 11:30	Report	Score by quarters: 4–1, 5–3, 2–2, 3–4			Aspire Dome, Doha; Referees: György Kun (HUN), Darren Spiritosanto (USA)
17 February 2024; 11:30	Report	Granados, Sanahuja 4	Goals	three players 2	Aspire Dome, Doha; Referees: György Kun (HUN), Darren Spiritosanto (USA)

=== Final ===
17 February 2024; 17:30	Report	Italy	13–15 (PSO)	Croatia	Aspire Dome, Doha; Referees: Frank Ohme (GER), Sébastien Dervieux (FRA)
17 February 2024; 17:30	Report	Score by quarters: 3–2, 2–3, 2–3, 4–3 PSO: 2–4			Aspire Dome, Doha; Referees: Frank Ohme (GER), Sébastien Dervieux (FRA)
17 February 2024; 17:30	Report	Fondelli 5	Goals	Kharkov 4	Aspire Dome, Doha; Referees: Frank Ohme (GER), Sébastien Dervieux (FRA)

== Final ranking ==
Rank	Team
1st place, gold medalist(s)	Croatia
2nd place, silver medalist(s)	Italy
3rd place, bronze medalist(s)	Spain
4	France
5	Greece
6	Serbia
7	Hungary
8	Montenegro
9	United States
10	Romania
11	Australia
12	China
13	Japan
14	Brazil
15	South Africa
16	Kazakhstan

Qualified for the 2024 Summer Olympics

2024 Men's Water Polo World Champions

Croatia
Third title

== Statistics and awards ==
=== Top goalscorers ===
Rank	Name	Goals	Shots	%
1	36	54	66	
2	(Italy) Andrea Fondelli	20	32	63
3	(Italy) Francesco Di Fulvio	18	44	41
3	(Croatia) Loren Fatović	18	36	50
3	(Hungary) Gergő Zalánki	18	35	51
6	(Romania) Vlad-Luca Georgescu	17	40	43
7	(Spain) Álvaro Granados	16	34	47
8	(France) Alexandre Bouet	15	31	48
8	(Japan) Yusuke Inaba	15	31	48
8	(Croatia) Jerko Marinić Kragić	15	33	45

=== Awards ===
The awards were announced on 17 February 2024.

All-star team
Goalkeeper	(Italy) Marco Del Lungo
Centre Forward	(Greece) Konstantinos Kakaris
Field player	(Italy) Francesco Di Fulvio
Field player	(Spain) Álvaro Granados
Field player	(Croatia) Konstantin Kharkov
Field player	(Hungary) Gergő Zalánki
Field player	Other awards
Best Goalkeeper	(Italy) Marco Del Lungo
