= Water polo at the 2024 Summer Olympics – Men's tournament =

Men's water polo at the Games of the XXXIII Olympiad

Tournament details
- Host country: France
- City: Paris
- Venue(s): Paris Aquatic Centre; Paris La Défense Arena
- Dates: 28 July – 11 August
- Teams: 12 (from 4 confederations)
- Competitors: 144

Final positions
- Champions: Serbia (6th title)
- Runners-up: Croatia
- Third place: United States
- Fourth place: Hungary

Tournament statistics
- Matches: 42
- Goals scored: 895 (21.31 per match)
- Top scorer(s): (Serbia) Dušan Mandić (26 goals)
- Most saves: (United States) Adrian Weinberg (94 saves in 8 matches)
- MVP: (Serbia) Dušan Mandić

The men's tournament of water polo at the 2024 Summer Olympics in Paris, France was held from 28 July to 11 August 2024 at the Paris Aquatic Centre and Paris La Défense Arena. It was the 28th official appearance of the tournament, which was not held in 1896 and was a demonstration sport in 1904 but otherwise has been held at every Olympics. Serbia captured their third title with a win over Croatia, while the United States won bronze (first medal since 2008) by defeating Hungary.

== Qualification ==
Qualification	Date	Host	Berths	Qualified team
Host country	—N/a		1	France
2023 World Aquatics Championships	17–29 July 2023	(Japan) Fukuoka	2	Hungary
2023 World Aquatics Championships	17–29 July 2023	(Japan) Fukuoka	2	Greece
2022 Asian Games	2–7 October 2023	(China) Hangzhou	1	Japan
2023 Pan American Games	30 October – 4 November 2023	(Chile) Santiago	1	United States
2024 European Championships	4–16 January 2024	(Croatia) Dubrovnik/Zagreb	1	Spain
2024 World Aquatics Championships	5–17 February 2024	(Qatar) Doha	4	Croatia
2024 World Aquatics Championships	5–17 February 2024	(Qatar) Doha	4	Italy
2024 World Aquatics Championships	5–17 February 2024	(Qatar) Doha	4	Serbia
2024 World Aquatics Championships	5–17 February 2024	(Qatar) Doha	4	Montenegro
2024 World Aquatics Championships – Africa	5–17 February 2024	(Qatar) Doha	~~1~~	~~South Africa~~
2024 World Aquatics Championships – Oceania	5–17 February 2024	(Qatar) Doha	1	Australia
2024 World Aquatics Championships – Reallocation	5–17 February 2024	(Qatar) Doha	1	Romania (Note: South Africa withdrew from the tournament after the 2024 World Aquatics Championships. Romania, as the best non-qualified team, took their spot.)
Total			12	

== Competition format ==
The twelve teams were seeded into two groups for a preliminary round. The teams in each group played a round-robin. The top four teams in each group advanced to the knockout round while the fifth- and sixth- placed teams were eliminated. The fifth placed teams was ranked ninth and tenth based on win–loss record, then goal average; the sixth-placed teams was ranked eleventh and twelfth in the same way. The knockout round began with quarterfinals and the winners advanced to the semifinals, while the quarterfinal losers played in the fifth- to eighth- place classification. The two semifinal winners played in the gold medal match, while the two semifinal losers played in the bronze medal match.

== Schedule ==
The competition began on 28 July, and matches were held every other day.

Legend
G	Group stage	¼	Quarter-finals	½	Semi-finals	B	Bronze medal match	F	Gold medal match

Sun 28	Mon 29	Tue 30	Wed 31	Thu 1	Fri 2	Sat 3	Sun 4	Mon 5	Tue 6	Wed 7	Thu 8	Fri 9	Sat 10	Sun 11	
G		G		G		G		G		¼		½		B	F

== Draw ==
The draw took place on 17 February 2024 in Doha, Qatar.

=== Seeding ===
The twelve teams in the men's tournament were drawn into two groups of six teams. The teams were seeded into six pots.

Pot 1	Pot 2	Pot 3	Pot 4	Pot 5	Pot 6
Hungary; Greece	Croatia; Spain	Australia; United States	Japan; Romania	Italy; Serbia	Montenegro; France (hosts)

== Referees ==
The following 24 referees were selected for the tournament.

- (Australia) Nicholas Hodgers
- (Canada) Hélène Painchaud
- (China) Zhang Liang
- (Croatia) Andrej Franulović
- (Egypt) Yasser Mehalhel
- (France) Aurélie Blanchard
- (France) Sébastien Dervieux
- (Germany) Frank Ohme
- (Greece) Natalia Markopoulou
- (Greece) Georgios Stavridis
- (Hungary) Nóra Debreceni
- (Hungary) Tamás Kovács
- (Italy) Rafaele Colombo
- (Italy) Alessia Ferrari
- (Japan) Chisato Kurosaki
- (Montenegro) Veselin Mišković
- (Netherlands) Michiel Zwart
- (Romania) Adrian Alexandrescu
- (Slovenia) Boris Margeta
- (Serbia) Vojin Putniković
- (Spain) Marta Cabañas
- (Spain) David Gómez
- (United States) Jennifer McCall
- (United States) Darren Spiritosanto

== Preliminary round ==
All times are local (UTC+2).

=== Group A ===
Pos	Team	Pld	W	PSW	PSL	L	GF	GA	GD	Pts	Qualification
1	Greece	5	3	1	0	1	61	52	+9	11 (Note: Greece 9–8 Italy)	Quarterfinals
2	Italy	5	3	1	0	1	60	43	+17	11	Quarterfinals
3	United States	5	3	0	0	2	59	51	+8	9 (Note: Croatia 11–14 United States)	Quarterfinals
4	Croatia	5	3	0	0	2	58	57	+1	9	Quarterfinals
5	Montenegro	5	1	0	2	2	45	50	−5	5	
6	Romania	5	0	0	0	5	37	67	−30	0	

Source: Olympics
Rules for classification: 1) Points; 2) Head-to-head points; 3) Head-to-head goal difference; 4) Head-to-head goals scored; 5) Goal difference.
Notes:

28 July 2024; 15:00 v	Report	Italy	12–8	United States	Paris Aquatic Centre, Paris; Referees: Tamás Kovács (HUN), Vojin Putniković (SRB)
28 July 2024; 15:00 v	Report	Score by quarters: 4–2, 1–1, 4–1, 3–4			Paris Aquatic Centre, Paris; Referees: Tamás Kovács (HUN), Vojin Putniković (SRB)
28 July 2024; 15:00 v	Report	three players 2	Goals	Daube 3	Paris Aquatic Centre, Paris; Referees: Tamás Kovács (HUN), Vojin Putniković (SRB)

28 July 2024; 16:35 v	Report	Croatia	11–8	Montenegro	Paris Aquatic Centre, Paris; Referees: Boris Margeta (SLO), David Gómez (ESP)
28 July 2024; 16:35 v	Report	Score by quarters: 3–1, 2–4, 3–1, 3–2			Paris Aquatic Centre, Paris; Referees: Boris Margeta (SLO), David Gómez (ESP)
28 July 2024; 16:35 v	Report	Fatović 3	Goals	Đurđić 3	Paris Aquatic Centre, Paris; Referees: Boris Margeta (SLO), David Gómez (ESP)

28 July 2024; 21:05 v	Report	Romania	7–14	Greece	Paris Aquatic Centre, Paris; Referees: Michiel Zwart (NED), Zhang Liang (CHN)
28 July 2024; 21:05 v	Report	Score by quarters: 2–4, 3–5, 1–2, 1–3			Paris Aquatic Centre, Paris; Referees: Michiel Zwart (NED), Zhang Liang (CHN)
28 July 2024; 21:05 v	Report	Georgescu, Neamțu 2	Goals	Argyropoulos 4	Paris Aquatic Centre, Paris; Referees: Michiel Zwart (NED), Zhang Liang (CHN)

30 July 2024; 12:05 v	Report	Croatia	11–14	Italy	Paris Aquatic Centre, Paris; Referees: Michiel Zwart (NED), Sébastien Dervieux (FRA)
30 July 2024; 12:05 v	Report	Score by quarters: 4–3, 2–3, 3–6, 2–2			Paris Aquatic Centre, Paris; Referees: Michiel Zwart (NED), Sébastien Dervieux (FRA)
30 July 2024; 12:05 v	Report	Fatović, Kharkov 2	Goals	Di Fulvio 4	Paris Aquatic Centre, Paris; Referees: Michiel Zwart (NED), Sébastien Dervieux (FRA)

30 July 2024; 16:35 v	Report	United States	14–8	Romania	Paris Aquatic Centre, Paris; Referees: David Gómez (ESP), Nicholas Hodgers (AUS)
30 July 2024; 16:35 v	Report	Score by quarters: 3–3, 3–0, 4–1, 4–4			Paris Aquatic Centre, Paris; Referees: David Gómez (ESP), Nicholas Hodgers (AUS)
30 July 2024; 16:35 v	Report	Bowen, Daube 3	Goals	Colodrovschi, Georgescu 3	Paris Aquatic Centre, Paris; Referees: David Gómez (ESP), Nicholas Hodgers (AUS)

30 July 2024; 19:30 v	Report	Montenegro	16–17 (PSO)	Greece	Paris Aquatic Centre, Paris; Referees: Frank Ohme (GER), Tamás Kovács (HUN)
30 July 2024; 19:30 v	Report	Score by quarters: 4–2, 3–3, 2–3, 3–4 PSO: 4–5			Paris Aquatic Centre, Paris; Referees: Frank Ohme (GER), Tamás Kovács (HUN)
30 July 2024; 19:30 v	Report	Popadić 4	Goals	Vlachopoulos 3	Paris Aquatic Centre, Paris; Referees: Frank Ohme (GER), Tamás Kovács (HUN)

1 August 2024; 10:30 v	Report	Greece	13–11	United States	Paris Aquatic Centre, Paris; Referees: David Gómez (ESP), Sébastien Dervieux (FRA)
1 August 2024; 10:30 v	Report	Score by quarters: 4–4, 3–2, 4–3, 2–2			Paris Aquatic Centre, Paris; Referees: David Gómez (ESP), Sébastien Dervieux (FRA)
1 August 2024; 10:30 v	Report	Argyropoulos 4	Goals	Bowen, Irving 2	Paris Aquatic Centre, Paris; Referees: David Gómez (ESP), Sébastien Dervieux (FRA)

1 August 2024; 16:35 v	Report	Italy	11–9 (PSO)	Montenegro	Paris Aquatic Centre, Paris; Referees: Boris Margeta (SLO), Michiel Zwart (NED)
1 August 2024; 16:35 v	Report	Score by quarters: 2–2, 2–2, 3–3, 1–1 PSO: 3–1			Paris Aquatic Centre, Paris; Referees: Boris Margeta (SLO), Michiel Zwart (NED)
1 August 2024; 16:35 v	Report	Di Fulvio, Echenique 2	Goals	Popadić 3	Paris Aquatic Centre, Paris; Referees: Boris Margeta (SLO), Michiel Zwart (NED)

1 August 2024; 19:30 v	Report	Romania	8–11	Croatia	Paris Aquatic Centre, Paris; Referees: Tamás Kovács (HUN), Chisato Kurosaki (JPN)
1 August 2024; 19:30 v	Report	Score by quarters: 0–3, 3–3, 4–5, 1–0			Paris Aquatic Centre, Paris; Referees: Tamás Kovács (HUN), Chisato Kurosaki (JPN)
1 August 2024; 19:30 v	Report	Fulea, Țepeluș 2	Goals	three players 2	Paris Aquatic Centre, Paris; Referees: Tamás Kovács (HUN), Chisato Kurosaki (JPN)

3 August 2024; 12:05 v	Report	Croatia	14–13	Greece	Paris Aquatic Centre, Paris; Referees: Vojin Putniković (SRB), David Gómez (ESP)
3 August 2024; 12:05 v	Report	Score by quarters: 3–3, 1–3, 7–3, 3–4			Paris Aquatic Centre, Paris; Referees: Vojin Putniković (SRB), David Gómez (ESP)
3 August 2024; 12:05 v	Report	Kharkov 4	Goals	five players 2	Paris Aquatic Centre, Paris; Referees: Vojin Putniković (SRB), David Gómez (ESP)

3 August 2024; 16:35 v	Report	Montenegro	7–12	United States	Paris Aquatic Centre, Paris; Referees: Frank Ohme (GER), Zhang Liang (CHN)
3 August 2024; 16:35 v	Report	Score by quarters: 1–4, 1–3, 4–3, 1–2			Paris Aquatic Centre, Paris; Referees: Frank Ohme (GER), Zhang Liang (CHN)
3 August 2024; 16:35 v	Report	Đurđić 3	Goals	Daube 5	Paris Aquatic Centre, Paris; Referees: Frank Ohme (GER), Zhang Liang (CHN)

3 August 2024; 21:05 v	Report	Italy	18–7	Romania	Paris Aquatic Centre, Paris; Referees: Tamás Kovács (HUN), Nicholas Hodgers (AUS)
3 August 2024; 21:05 v	Report	Score by quarters: 6–2, 4–1, 5–1, 3–3			Paris Aquatic Centre, Paris; Referees: Tamás Kovács (HUN), Nicholas Hodgers (AUS)
3 August 2024; 21:05 v	Report	three players 3	Goals	Colodrovschi 3	Paris Aquatic Centre, Paris; Referees: Tamás Kovács (HUN), Nicholas Hodgers (AUS)

5 August 2024; 15:10 v	Report	Greece	9–8	Italy	Paris La Défense Arena, Paris; Referees: Michiel Zwart (NED), Zhang Liang (CHN)
5 August 2024; 15:10 v	Report	Score by quarters: 2–2, 4–3, 0–1, 3–2			Paris La Défense Arena, Paris; Referees: Michiel Zwart (NED), Zhang Liang (CHN)
5 August 2024; 15:10 v	Report	Argyropoulos 4	Goals	Bruni, Condemi 3	Paris La Défense Arena, Paris; Referees: Michiel Zwart (NED), Zhang Liang (CHN)

5 August 2024; 18:30 v	Report	Croatia	11–14	United States	Paris La Défense Arena, Paris; Referees: Sébastien Dervieux (FRA), Frank Ohme (GER)
5 August 2024; 18:30 v	Report	Score by quarters: 2–5, 3–5, 2–1, 4–3			Paris La Défense Arena, Paris; Referees: Sébastien Dervieux (FRA), Frank Ohme (GER)
5 August 2024; 18:30 v	Report	Kharkov 5	Goals	Daube, Irving 3	Paris La Défense Arena, Paris; Referees: Sébastien Dervieux (FRA), Frank Ohme (GER)

5 August 2024; 21:40 v	Report	Romania	7–10	Montenegro	Paris La Défense Arena, Paris; Referees: Boris Margeta (SLO), Yasser Mehalhel (EGY)
5 August 2024; 21:40 v	Report	Score by quarters: 3–3, 1–2, 1–2, 2–3			Paris La Défense Arena, Paris; Referees: Boris Margeta (SLO), Yasser Mehalhel (EGY)
5 August 2024; 21:40 v	Report	Fulea 2	Goals	Mršić 3	Paris La Défense Arena, Paris; Referees: Boris Margeta (SLO), Yasser Mehalhel (EGY)

=== Group B ===
Pos	Team	Pld	W	PSW	PSL	L	GF	GA	GD	Pts	Qualification
1	Spain	5	5	0	0	0	67	39	+28	15	Quarterfinals
2	Australia	5	3	0	0	2	44	42	+2	9 (Note: Australia 9–8 Hungary)	Quarterfinals
3	Hungary	5	3	0	0	2	62	54	+8	9	Quarterfinals
4	Serbia	5	2	0	0	3	58	63	−5	6	Quarterfinals
5	France (H)	5	1	0	0	4	50	60	−10	3 (Note: France 14–13 Japan)	
6	Japan	5	1	0	0	4	60	83	−23	3	

Source: Olympics
Rules for classification: 1) Points; 2) Head-to-head points; 3) Head-to-head goal difference; 4) Head-to-head goals scored; 5) Goal difference.
(H) Host
Notes:

28 July 2024; 10:30 v	Report	Australia	5–9	Spain	Paris Aquatic Centre, Paris; Referees: Georgios Stavridis (GRE), Darren Spiritosanto (USA)
28 July 2024; 10:30 v	Report	Score by quarters: 1–2, 2–3, 1–3, 1–1			Paris Aquatic Centre, Paris; Referees: Georgios Stavridis (GRE), Darren Spiritosanto (USA)
28 July 2024; 10:30 v	Report	Lambie, Maksimovic 2	Goals	Munárriz 3	Paris Aquatic Centre, Paris; Referees: Georgios Stavridis (GRE), Darren Spiritosanto (USA)

28 July 2024; 12:05 v	Report	Serbia	16–15	Japan	Paris Aquatic Centre, Paris; Referees: Rafaele Colombo (ITA), Veselin Mišković (MNE)
28 July 2024; 12:05 v	Report	Score by quarters: 4–4, 3–4, 5–3, 4–4			Paris Aquatic Centre, Paris; Referees: Rafaele Colombo (ITA), Veselin Mišković (MNE)
28 July 2024; 12:05 v	Report	Mandić 7	Goals	Inaba 6	Paris Aquatic Centre, Paris; Referees: Rafaele Colombo (ITA), Veselin Mišković (MNE)

28 July 2024; 19:30 v	Report	France	12–13	Hungary	Paris Aquatic Centre, Paris; Referees: Adrian Alexandrescu (ROU), Andrej Franulović (CRO)
28 July 2024; 19:30 v	Report	Score by quarters: 1–5, 4–4, 2–1, 5–3			Paris Aquatic Centre, Paris; Referees: Adrian Alexandrescu (ROU), Andrej Franulović (CRO)
28 July 2024; 19:30 v	Report	Vernoux 4	Goals	Vigvári 3	Paris Aquatic Centre, Paris; Referees: Adrian Alexandrescu (ROU), Andrej Franulović (CRO)

30 July 2024; 10:30 v	Report	Australia	8–3	Serbia	Paris Aquatic Centre, Paris; Referees: Andrej Franulović (CRO), Zhang Liang (CHN)
30 July 2024; 10:30 v	Report	Score by quarters: 1–0, 5–1, 1–0, 1–2			Paris Aquatic Centre, Paris; Referees: Andrej Franulović (CRO), Zhang Liang (CHN)
30 July 2024; 10:30 v	Report	Pavillard 4	Goals	Mandić 2	Paris Aquatic Centre, Paris; Referees: Andrej Franulović (CRO), Zhang Liang (CHN)

30 July 2024; 15:00 v	Report	Japan	13–14	France	Paris Aquatic Centre, Paris; Referees: Georgios Stavridis (GRE), Darren Spiritosanto (USA)
30 July 2024; 15:00 v	Report	Score by quarters: 4–4, 2–3, 3–3, 4–4			Paris Aquatic Centre, Paris; Referees: Georgios Stavridis (GRE), Darren Spiritosanto (USA)
30 July 2024; 15:00 v	Report	Inaba 6	Goals	Bodegas 3	Paris Aquatic Centre, Paris; Referees: Georgios Stavridis (GRE), Darren Spiritosanto (USA)

30 July 2024; 21:05 v	Report	Spain	10–7	Hungary	Paris Aquatic Centre, Paris; Referees: Boris Margeta (SLO), Rafaele Colombo (ITA)
30 July 2024; 21:05 v	Report	Score by quarters: 2–1, 2–2, 4–3, 2–1			Paris Aquatic Centre, Paris; Referees: Boris Margeta (SLO), Rafaele Colombo (ITA)
30 July 2024; 21:05 v	Report	three players 2	Goals	Angyal 2	Paris Aquatic Centre, Paris; Referees: Boris Margeta (SLO), Rafaele Colombo (ITA)

1 August 2024; 12:05 v	Report	Serbia	11–15	Spain	Paris Aquatic Centre, Paris; Referees: Adrian Alexandrescu (ROU), Rafaele Colombo (ITA)
1 August 2024; 12:05 v	Report	Score by quarters: 3–4, 3–3, 3–3, 2–5			Paris Aquatic Centre, Paris; Referees: Adrian Alexandrescu (ROU), Rafaele Colombo (ITA)
1 August 2024; 12:05 v	Report	Mandić 4	Goals	Granados 4	Paris Aquatic Centre, Paris; Referees: Adrian Alexandrescu (ROU), Rafaele Colombo (ITA)

1 August 2024; 15:00 v	Report	France	8–9	Australia	Paris Aquatic Centre, Paris; Referees: Andrej Franulović (CRO), Veselin Mišković (MNE)
1 August 2024; 15:00 v	Report	Score by quarters: 0–1, 3–3, 2–3, 3–2			Paris Aquatic Centre, Paris; Referees: Andrej Franulović (CRO), Veselin Mišković (MNE)
1 August 2024; 15:00 v	Report	Crousillat, Bjoch 3	Goals	Maksimovic 3	Paris Aquatic Centre, Paris; Referees: Andrej Franulović (CRO), Veselin Mišković (MNE)

1 August 2024; 21:05 v	Report	Hungary	17–10	Japan	Paris Aquatic Centre, Paris; Referees: Frank Ohme (GER), Zhang Liang (CHN)
1 August 2024; 21:05 v	Report	Score by quarters: 5–2, 4–2, 3–2, 5–4			Paris Aquatic Centre, Paris; Referees: Frank Ohme (GER), Zhang Liang (CHN)
1 August 2024; 21:05 v	Report	Vigvári 4	Goals	Watanabe 3	Paris Aquatic Centre, Paris; Referees: Frank Ohme (GER), Zhang Liang (CHN)

3 August 2024; 10:30 v	Report	Spain	23–8	Japan	Paris Aquatic Centre, Paris; Referees: Michiel Zwart (NED), Darren Spiritosanto (USA)
3 August 2024; 10:30 v	Report	Score by quarters: 4–0, 6–2, 7–4, 6–2			Paris Aquatic Centre, Paris; Referees: Michiel Zwart (NED), Darren Spiritosanto (USA)
3 August 2024; 10:30 v	Report	Sanahuja 5	Goals	Okawa 2	Paris Aquatic Centre, Paris; Referees: Michiel Zwart (NED), Darren Spiritosanto (USA)

3 August 2024; 15:00 v	Report	Australia	9–8	Hungary	Paris Aquatic Centre, Paris; Referees: Georgios Stavridis (GRE), Veselin Mišković (MNE)
3 August 2024; 15:00 v	Report	Score by quarters: 2–2, 2–3, 2–2, 3–1			Paris Aquatic Centre, Paris; Referees: Georgios Stavridis (GRE), Veselin Mišković (MNE)
3 August 2024; 15:00 v	Report	Edwards, Maksimovic 2	Goals	Manhercz 4	Paris Aquatic Centre, Paris; Referees: Georgios Stavridis (GRE), Veselin Mišković (MNE)

3 August 2024; 19:30 v	Report	Serbia	15–8	France	Paris Aquatic Centre, Paris; Referees: Boris Margeta (SLO), Adrian Alexandrescu (ROU)
3 August 2024; 19:30 v	Report	Score by quarters: 4–2, 4–2, 4–2, 3–2			Paris Aquatic Centre, Paris; Referees: Boris Margeta (SLO), Adrian Alexandrescu (ROU)
3 August 2024; 19:30 v	Report	four players 2	Goals	Marzouki, Vernoux 2	Paris Aquatic Centre, Paris; Referees: Boris Margeta (SLO), Adrian Alexandrescu (ROU)

5 August 2024; 12:00 v	Report	Hungary	17–13	Serbia	Paris La Défense Arena, Paris; Referees: Adrian Alexandrescu (ROU), Andrej Franulović (CRO)
5 August 2024; 12:00 v	Report	Score by quarters: 2–4, 7–3, 6–2, 2–4			Paris La Défense Arena, Paris; Referees: Adrian Alexandrescu (ROU), Andrej Franulović (CRO)
5 August 2024; 12:00 v	Report	Fekete, Zalánki 4	Goals	Mandić 5	Paris La Défense Arena, Paris; Referees: Adrian Alexandrescu (ROU), Andrej Franulović (CRO)

5 August 2024; 13:35 v	Report	Australia	13–14	Japan	Paris La Défense Arena, Paris; Referees: Rafaele Colombo (ITA), Darren Spiritosanto (USA)
5 August 2024; 13:35 v	Report	Score by quarters: 5–2, 2–4, 2–4, 4–4			Paris La Défense Arena, Paris; Referees: Rafaele Colombo (ITA), Darren Spiritosanto (USA)
5 August 2024; 13:35 v	Report	Maksimovic 3	Goals	Inaba 6	Paris La Défense Arena, Paris; Referees: Rafaele Colombo (ITA), Darren Spiritosanto (USA)

5 August 2024; 20:05 v	Report	France	8–10	Spain	Paris La Défense Arena, Paris; Referees: Georgios Stavridis (GRE), Veselin Mišković (MNE)
5 August 2024; 20:05 v	Report	Score by quarters: 1–3, 2–2, 4–2, 1–3			Paris La Défense Arena, Paris; Referees: Georgios Stavridis (GRE), Veselin Mišković (MNE)
5 August 2024; 20:05 v	Report	Crousillat 3	Goals	Munárriz, Sanahuja 3	Paris La Défense Arena, Paris; Referees: Georgios Stavridis (GRE), Veselin Mišković (MNE)

== Knockout stage ==
=== Bracket ===
Quarter-finals
7 August
Greece	11
Serbia	12
7 August
United States (PSO)	7 (4)
Australia	7 (3)
7 August
Italy	9 (1)
Hungary (PSO)	9 (3)
7 August
Croatia	10
Spain	8

Semi-finals
9 August
Serbia	10
United States	6
9 August
Hungary	8
Croatia	9

Gold medal
11 August
Serbia	13
Croatia	11
Bronze medal
11 August
United States (PSO)	8 (3)
Hungary	8 (0)

Fifth place bracket

5–8th place semifinals
9 August
Greece	15
Australia	9
9 August
Italy	9
Spain	11

Fifth place
11 August
Greece	15
Spain	13
Seventh place
10 August
Australia	6
Italy	10

=== Quarterfinals ===
7 August 2024; 14:00 v	Report	Croatia	10–8	Spain	Paris La Défense Arena, Paris; Referees: Boris Margeta (SLO), Darren Spiritosanto (USA)
7 August 2024; 14:00 v	Report	Score by quarters: 2–0, 4–3, 2–2, 2–3			Paris La Défense Arena, Paris; Referees: Boris Margeta (SLO), Darren Spiritosanto (USA)
7 August 2024; 14:00 v	Report	three players 2	Goals	three players 2	Paris La Défense Arena, Paris; Referees: Boris Margeta (SLO), Darren Spiritosanto (USA)

7 August 2024; 15:35 v	Report	Greece	11–12	Serbia	Paris La Défense Arena, Paris; Referees: Frank Ohme (GER), Andrej Franulović (CRO)
7 August 2024; 15:35 v	Report	Score by quarters: 3–3, 2–3, 4–2, 2–4			Paris La Défense Arena, Paris; Referees: Frank Ohme (GER), Andrej Franulović (CRO)
7 August 2024; 15:35 v	Report	Skoumpakis 3	Goals	Mandić 5	Paris La Défense Arena, Paris; Referees: Frank Ohme (GER), Andrej Franulović (CRO)

7 August 2024; 19:00 v	Report	United States	11–10 (PSO)	Australia	Paris La Défense Arena, Paris; Referees: Rafaele Colombo (ITA), Sébastien Dervieux (FRA)
7 August 2024; 19:00 v	Report	Score by quarters: 1–3, 2–2, 2–0, 2–2 PSO: 4–3			Paris La Défense Arena, Paris; Referees: Rafaele Colombo (ITA), Sébastien Dervieux (FRA)
7 August 2024; 19:00 v	Report	Bowen, Daube 2	Goals	Pavillard 4	Paris La Défense Arena, Paris; Referees: Rafaele Colombo (ITA), Sébastien Dervieux (FRA)

7 August 2024; 20:35 v	Report	Italy	10–12 (PSO)	Hungary	Paris La Défense Arena, Paris; Referees: Adrian Alexandrescu (ROU), Veselin Mišković (MNE)
7 August 2024; 20:35 v	Report	Score by quarters: 2–3, 0–1, 5–2, 2–3 PSO: 1–3			Paris La Défense Arena, Paris; Referees: Adrian Alexandrescu (ROU), Veselin Mišković (MNE)
7 August 2024; 20:35 v	Report	Di Fulvio, Echenique 3	Goals	Manhercz 4	Paris La Défense Arena, Paris; Referees: Adrian Alexandrescu (ROU), Veselin Mišković (MNE)

=== 5–8th place semifinals ===
9 August 2024; 13:00 v	Report	Italy	9–11	Spain	Paris La Défense Arena, Paris; Referees: Michiel Zwart (NED), Sébastien Dervieux (FRA)
9 August 2024; 13:00 v	Report	Score by quarters: 0–4, 3–2, 3–3, 3–2			Paris La Défense Arena, Paris; Referees: Michiel Zwart (NED), Sébastien Dervieux (FRA)
9 August 2024; 13:00 v	Report	Echenique, Iocchi Gratta 2	Goals	Granados, Perrone 3	Paris La Défense Arena, Paris; Referees: Michiel Zwart (NED), Sébastien Dervieux (FRA)

9 August 2024; 18:00 v	Report	Greece	15–9	Australia	Paris La Défense Arena, Paris; Referees: Tamás Kovács (HUN), Andrej Franulović (CRO)
9 August 2024; 18:00 v	Report	Score by quarters: 3–1, 2–2, 5–3, 5–3			Paris La Défense Arena, Paris; Referees: Tamás Kovács (HUN), Andrej Franulović (CRO)
9 August 2024; 18:00 v	Report	Kakaris 4	Goals	three players 2	Paris La Défense Arena, Paris; Referees: Tamás Kovács (HUN), Andrej Franulović (CRO)

=== Semifinals ===
9 August 2024; 14:35 v	Report	Serbia	10–6	United States	Paris La Défense Arena, Paris; Referees: Georgios Stavridis (GRE), Rafaele Colombo (ITA)
9 August 2024; 14:35 v	Report	Score by quarters: 2–2, 4–2, 2–2, 2–0			Paris La Défense Arena, Paris; Referees: Georgios Stavridis (GRE), Rafaele Colombo (ITA)
9 August 2024; 14:35 v	Report	Dedović 4	Goals	Vavic 2	Paris La Défense Arena, Paris; Referees: Georgios Stavridis (GRE), Rafaele Colombo (ITA)

9 August 2024; 19:35 v	Report	Hungary	8–9	Croatia	Paris La Défense Arena, Paris; Referees: Frank Ohme (GER), David Gómez (ESP)
9 August 2024; 19:35 v	Report	Score by quarters: 3–3, 2–4, 2–2, 1–0			Paris La Défense Arena, Paris; Referees: Frank Ohme (GER), David Gómez (ESP)
9 August 2024; 19:35 v	Report	Jansik, Vámos 2	Goals	Fatović 5	Paris La Défense Arena, Paris; Referees: Frank Ohme (GER), David Gómez (ESP)

=== Seventh place game ===
10 August 2024; 19:35 v	Report	Australia	6–10	Italy	Paris La Défense Arena, Paris; Referees: David Gómez (ESP), Chisato Kurosaki (JPN)
10 August 2024; 19:35 v	Report	Score by quarters: 1–2, 1–3, 2–4, 2–1			Paris La Défense Arena, Paris; Referees: David Gómez (ESP), Chisato Kurosaki (JPN)
10 August 2024; 19:35 v	Report	Maksimovic 2	Goals	Iocchi Gratta 3	Paris La Défense Arena, Paris; Referees: David Gómez (ESP), Chisato Kurosaki (JPN)

=== Fifth place game ===
11 August 2024; 09:00 v	Report	Greece	15–13	Spain	Paris La Défense Arena, Paris; Referees: Frank Ohme (GER), Rafaele Colombo (ITA)
11 August 2024; 09:00 v	Report	Score by quarters: 2–2, 6–4, 4–1, 3–6			Paris La Défense Arena, Paris; Referees: Frank Ohme (GER), Rafaele Colombo (ITA)
11 August 2024; 09:00 v	Report	three players 3	Goals	Sanahuja 3	Paris La Défense Arena, Paris; Referees: Frank Ohme (GER), Rafaele Colombo (ITA)

=== Bronze medal game ===
11 August 2024; 10:35 v	Report	United States	11–8 (PSO)	Hungary	Paris La Défense Arena, Paris; Referees: Sébastien Dervieux (FRA), David Gómez (ESP)
11 August 2024; 10:35 v	Report	Score by quarters: 3–2, 1–1, 2–2, 2–3 PSO: 3–0			Paris La Défense Arena, Paris; Referees: Sébastien Dervieux (FRA), David Gómez (ESP)
11 August 2024; 10:35 v	Report	Hallock 2	Goals	Varga, Zalánki 2	Paris La Défense Arena, Paris; Referees: Sébastien Dervieux (FRA), David Gómez (ESP)

=== Gold medal game ===
11 August 2024; 14:00 v	Report	Serbia	13–11	Croatia	Paris La Défense Arena, Paris; Referees: Boris Margeta (SLO), Michiel Zwart (NED)
11 August 2024; 14:00 v	Report	Score by quarters: 5–2, 3–3, 3–3, 2–3			Paris La Défense Arena, Paris; Referees: Boris Margeta (SLO), Michiel Zwart (NED)
11 August 2024; 14:00 v	Report	Ćuk 3	Goals	Marinić Kragić 3	Paris La Défense Arena, Paris; Referees: Boris Margeta (SLO), Michiel Zwart (NED)

== Final ranking ==
Rank	Team
Gold medal	Serbia
Silver medal	Croatia
Bronze medal	United States
4	Hungary
5	Greece
6	Spain
7	Italy
8	Australia
9	Montenegro
10	France
11	Japan
12	Romania

2024 Men's Olympic champions

Serbia
Sixth title

== Top goalscorers ==
Rank	Name	Goals	Shots	%
1	(Serbia) Dušan Mandić	26	49	53
2	(Croatia) Loren Fatović	22	44	50
3	(Japan) Yusuke Inaba	21	45	47
4	(Spain) Álvaro Granados	20	51	39
5	(Greece) Stylianos Argyropoulos	18	41	44
5	(United States) Hannes Daube	18	31	58
7	(Croatia) Konstantin Kharkov	17	35	49
8	(Australia) Milos Maksimovic	16	39	41
8	(Spain) Alberto Munárriz	16	43	37
8	(Spain) Bernat Sanahuja	16	38	42

== Awards ==
The all-star team was announced on 11 August 2024.

Position	Player
Goalkeeper	(United States) Adrian Weinberg
Field players	(Spain) Alvaro Granados
Field players	(United States) Hannes Daube
Field players	(Serbia) Dušan Mandić
Field players	(Japan) Yusuke Inaba
Field players	(Croatia) Loren Fatović
Field players	(Hungary) Krisztián Manhercz
MVP	(Serbia) Dušan Mandić

== Medalists ==
Gold	Silver	Bronze
Serbia Radoslav Filipović (GK); Dušan Mandić; Strahinja Rašović; Sava Ranđelović; Miloš Ćuk; Nikola Dedović; Radomir Drašović; Nikola Jakšić (C); Nemanja Ubović; Nemanja Vico; Petar Jakšić; Viktor Rašović; Vladimir Mišović (GK) Head coach: Uroš Stevanović	Croatia Marko Bijač (GK, C); Rino Burić; Loren Fatović; Luka Lončar; Maro Joković; Luka Bukić; Ante Vukičević; Marko Žuvela; Jerko Marinić Kragić; Josip Vrlić; Matias Biljaka; Konstantin Kharkov; Toni Popadić (GK) Head coach: Ivica Tucak	United States Adrian Weinberg (GK); Johnny Hooper; Marko Vavic; Alex Obert; Hannes Daube; Luca Cupido; Ben Hallock (C); Dylan Woodhead; Alex Bowen; Chase Dodd; Ryder Dodd; Max Irving; Drew Holland (GK) Head coach: Dejan Udovičić

== See also ==
- Water polo at the 2024 Summer Olympics – Women's tournament
