= Chase Dodd =

American water polo player (born 2003)

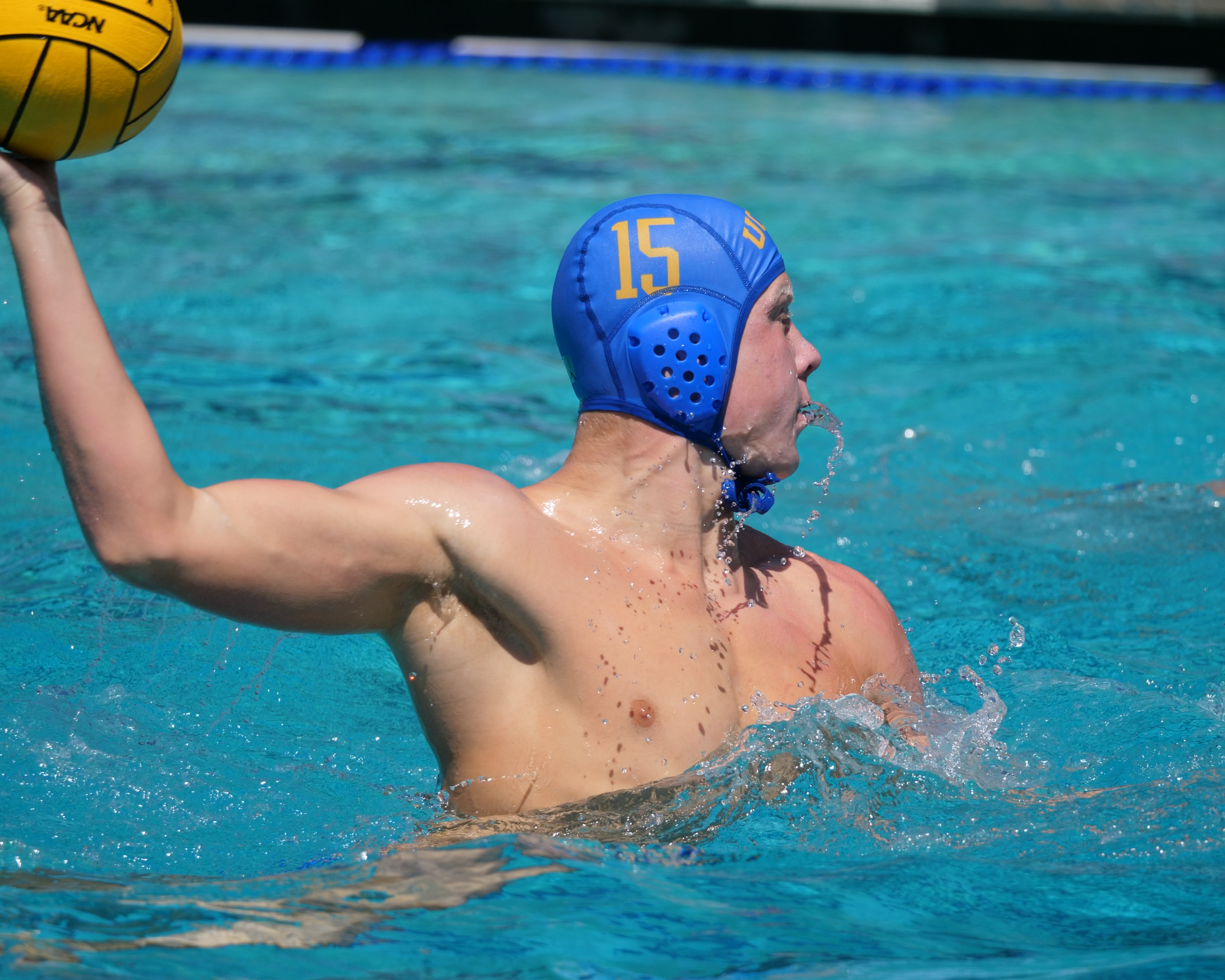
- Dodd in 2022

Personal information
- Full name: Chase William Dodd
- Born: April 5, 2003 (age 23) Long Beach, California, U.S.
- Height: 6 ft 3 in (1.90 m)

Sport
- Country: American
- Sport: Swimming, Water Polo
- Position: Attacker, WP
- College team: University of California Los Angeles
- Club: Los Angeles Athletic Club
- Coached by: Adam Wright (UCLA), Eric Carnohan (LAAC)
Medal record
Men's water polo
Representing the United States
Olympic Games
Bronze medal – third place	2024 Paris	Team
Pan American Games
Gold medal – first place	2023 Santiago	Team

Chase William Dodd (born April 5, 2003) is an American water polo player. He represented United States at the 2024 Summer Olympics where the U.S. team won a bronze medal.

== Early life ==
Chase Dodd was born April 5, 2003 to Janet and Steve Dodd in Long Beach, California. He attended Huntington Beach High School where he won varsity letters in four successive years, competing in both water polo and swimming under Coach Sasa Branisavljevic. In High School swimming, Chase was a 2018 and 2021 All-American, and 2021 held the 100-yard backstroke school record. In High School era water polo, he was All Sunset League first team in both 2020 and 2019, and in 2020 was a Player of the Year for Orange County. He participated in a Water Polo Club league for Huntington's Vanguard Aquatics.

== University of California Los Angeles ==
Dodd attended and played for the University of California Los Angeles from around 2021-2025, where he was managed by Head Coach Adam Wright, a former Olympian and UCLA graduate. In 2024, the UCLA water polo team won the NCAA championship with an 11-8 win over the University of Southern California. At UCLA, Dodd was twice a ACWPC All-American, making first team in 2024, and receiving an honorable mention in 2022. Dodd left UCLA in 2023 to train for the 2024 Olympics. He was later voted to the 2024 NCAA All-Tournament Team. Chase Dodd was also an accomplished student, making the Honor Roll of the UCLA Athletic Director in seven semesters from 2021-2025. Chase's younger brother Ryder Dodd also played for UCLA, was a recipient of the Peter Cutino Award in 2025, and also participated in water polo on the 2024 U.S. Olympic team.

== 2024 Olympic bronze ==
Dodd participated in the 2024 Paris Olympics, where the U.S. water polo team won a bronze medal. In the final Olympic match for the bronze, in a penalty shot, the U.S. defeated Hungary for the bronze, to take its first medal since the Beijing Olympics in 2008. Hungary placed fourth overall, with Serbia taking the gold medal, and Croatia taking the silver.

In international competition, at the Doha 2024 World Aquatics World Championships, where the U.S. placed ninth, he made two goals. In the 2023 Fukuoka, Japan World Championships, he was credited with eight goals, and the U.S. National team placed seventh. At the 2023 Pan American games in Santiago, Chile, Dodd played with the U.S. team that won a gold medal in the Pan American Water Polo team competition.
