= Hannes Daube =

American water polo player (born 2000)

Personal information
- Full name: Hannes Peter Daube
- Born: January 5, 2000 (age 26) Newport Beach, California, U.S.
- Height: 6 ft 6 in (1.98 m)

Sport
- Sport: Water Polo
- Position: Driver (WP)
- College team: U. Southern California
- Club: Northwood Red Club; Newport Beach Club
- Coached by: Marko Pintarac (USC); Dejan Udovičić ('24 Olympics)
Medal record
Men's water polo
Representing the United States
Olympic Games
Bronze medal – third place	2024 Paris	Team
World Cup
Bronze medal – third place	2023 Los Angeles
Pan American Games
Gold medal – first place	2019 Lima	Team
Gold medal – first place	2023 Santiago	Team

Hannes Peter Daube (/ˈhʌnɪs ˈdoʊbeɪ/ HUN-iss DOH-bay; born January 5, 2000) is an American water polo player. He competed in the 2020 Summer Olympics. He also competed in the 2024 Summer Olympics where he won a bronze medal and was named to the all tournament team for his standout performance. He has played professional water polo in Australia and in Greece for the Apollon Smyrnis team.

== Early life ==
Daube was born in Newport Beach, California on January 1, 2000 to a German mother and a father from New Zealand. From a family that strongly valued water polo as a sport, his older sister Eike Daube played water polo for USC and was part of their NCAA Women’s Championship Water Polo team in 2013. Hannes attended and played water polo representing Orange County Lutheran High School where he was twice a selection for All-CIF honors as First Team. In 2016, his High School team won the CIF Championship in the Division 1 category. In water polo club play, he competed for both the Northwood Red Club and the well-known Newport Beach Club, also known as the Newport Water Polo Federation team, which had been coached by Water Polo Hall of Fame Coach Bill Barnett.

== University of Southern California ==
Majoring in communications, Daube attended and played college water polo at the University of Southern California from around 2018-2022 under Head Coach Marko Pintarac where he earned All-American honors in three years. In 2021, Daube was USC's second leading scorer in goals with 37, and earned First Team recognition as an All-American, though he took off part of the 2020-2021 season to compete with the U.S. National team and train for the Olympics. In 2019 as a Sophomore, he was USC's third leading scorer, credited with 36 points.

== 2020-24 Olympics ==
Daube competed in the 2020 Summer Olympics in Tokyo where the U.S. team placed sixth overall. Serbia took the gold, Greece took the silver, and Hungary took the bronze.

Daube represented the U.S. again in the 2024 Paris Olympics where the U.S. team captured the bronze medal in the Men's Olympic water polo competition and he was managed by Head U.S. Water Polo Coach Dejan Udovičić. His Olympic water polo teammate Marko Vavic also had played for the University of Southern California. Serbia, a pre-game favorite performed well in its semi-final matches, and beat the U.S. team, 10-6, before capturing another close win against the team from Croatia in the finals with a score of 13-11. In the match for the bronze, the U.S. team defeated Hungary in a penalty shot to take the bronze and the team's first water polo medal since winning silver at the 2008 Beijing Olympics.

=== International competition highlights ===
In international play, Daube played on the U.S. national team for the 2024 World Cup that won a bronze medal. He was on the U.S. team that at the 2022 FINA World League Super Final captured a silver medal. He competed with the U.S. National team in World Championships in 2019, 2022, 2023, and 2024. In the Pan American Games, he was on the U.S. team that won a gold medal 2019 Water Polo Competition in Lima, Peru. He was later on the U.S. National team that captured a gold medal in the 2023 Pan American Games's Men's Water Polo competition in Santiago, Chile.

=== Professional water polo ===
He has played professionally in Europe and Australia and has played with the Greek team Olympiacos in 2020-2021. He more recently in the 2025-6 season signed to play for Apollon Smyrnis in Greece. He has competed for Dubrovnik Croatia's VK Jug. In 2022-23, he played with Marseille in France.
