= Adrian Weinberg =

American water polo player (born 2001)

Personal information
- Full name: Adrian Leonardo Weinberg
- Born: November 25, 2001 (age 24) Los Angeles, California, U.S.
- Education: University of California, Berkeley
- Height: 6 ft 5 in (196 cm)
- Weight: 200 lb (91 kg)

Sport
- Country: United States
- Sport: Water polo
- Position: Goalkeeper
- College team: U. Cal Berkeley
- Coached by: Jack Kocur (Oaks Christian); Kirk Everist (Berkeley); Dejan Udovicic (24 Olympics)
Medal record
Men's water polo
Representing the United States
Olympic Games
Bronze medal – third place	2024 Paris	Team

Adrian Leonardo Weinberg (born November 25, 2001) is an American water polo player who has played for Panathinaikos AC. He was selected as part of the United States team at the 2024 Summer Olympics in Paris that won a team bronze medal in the Men's water polo Olympic team competition.

== Early life ==
Weinberg was born on November 25, 2001, in Los Angeles, California to Maria Perez and Jon Weinberg. He started swimming at age seven, and later tried out with an area youth water polo team. Initially a position player, he later tried out goalkeeper and immediately, "he had found his spot". He played for the Pride Water Polo Academy and continued his career at Oaks Christian School in Westlake Village.

At Oaks Christian, where he graduated in 2019, and was trained and managed by Head Coach Jack Kocur, Weinberg was a four-year letterman in water polo and helped the school to the 2016 Division 3 championship and an appearance in the 2018 Division 1 championship. In one year, he recorded 248 saves and averaged 12.4 stops per game, being chosen first-team All-American, the Division 3 co-player of the year and the Elite 8 most valuable player. He was also named the Ventura County Star Water Polo Player of the Year.

== University of California Berkeley ==
Weinberg attended the University of California, Berkeley, under Head Coach Kirk Everist and initially intended on redshirting as a freshman, due the California Golden Bears having a returning starter and All-American at goalkeeper. Since taking over the Men's water polo team in 2002, Everist has led his teams to five NCAA National titles. However, the head coach convinced him to try to play, and Weinberg ultimately won the starting job in his first year. He became one of the top goalkeepers nationally and started 22 of 23 games, recording 217 saves while being named honorable mention All-Mountain Pacific Sports Federation (MPSF) and honorable mention All-American by the Association of College Water Polo Coaches (ACWPC). In his sophomore year, he was the MPSF leader in saves per game and was chosen second-team All-MPSF while being third in save percentage.

In 2021, Weinberg again led the MPSF in saves per game and in total saves, being named second-team All-American, second-team All-MPSF and helping the Golden Bears to the NCAA national championship while being named to the NCAA Championship All-Tournament team. He won another national championship in 2022, won another All-MPSF selection and recorded 204 total saves. He returned for a final season in 2023 and won his third-straight national championship, having 200 saves on the year.

== International career ==
Weinberg was a member of the USA Water Polo program from a young age; he competed internationally for the Development Team & Youth National Team in 2015 and for the Cadet National Team in 2016. He played for the junior national team at the FINA Junior Water Polo World Championships in 2019 and 2021 and trained with the senior national team prior to the 2020 Summer Olympics, although he did not compete there. He was called up to the senior national team for the 2022 World Aquatics Championships and also participated at the 2022 FINA Men's Water Polo World League tournament. In 2023, he played at the World Aquatics World Cup, the World Aquatics Championships and the Pan American Games. He played at the 2024 World Aquatics Championships and was later selected for the U.S. squad at the 2024 Summer Olympics.

== 2024 Paris Olympics ==
Weinberg was on the men's water polo team at the 2024 Summer Olympics in Paris under Head Olympic Coach Dejan Udovicic that won the team bronze medal in the 2024 Olympic water polo team competition.

Named the best goalkeeper at the 2024 Olympics, he was credited with the most saves, the third best save percentage, and the second most powerplay saves. He was credited with a goal, in addition to two penalty shootout victories, in which he saved two penalties each. Weinberg helped lead the team to the Bronze medal after a 11-8 shootout victory over Hungary.
