= Rino Burić =

Croatian water polo player (born 1997)

Personal information
- Nationality: Croatian
- Born: 5 April 1997 (age 29) Split, Croatia
- Height: 197 cm (78 in)

Sport
- Sport: Water polo
- Position: CB
- Current club: Pro Recco

Senior clubs
- Years: Team
- Mornar Split
- 2019–2023: Jadran Split
- 2023–: Jug Dubrovnik
National team
- Years: Team
- 2017–: Croatia
Medal record
Men's water polo
Representing Croatia
Olympic Games
Silver medal – second place	2024 Paris	Team
World Aquatics Championships
Gold medal – first place	2024 Doha	Team
European Water Polo Championships
Gold medal – first place	2022 Split	Team
Silver medal – second place	2024 Zagreb	Team

Rino Burić (born 5 April 1997) is a Croatian water polo player. He represented Croatia at the 2024 Summer Olympics.
