= Ryder Dodd =

American water polo player (born 2006)

Personal information
- Full name: Ryder Michael Dodd
- Nationality: American
- Born: January 19, 2006 (age 20) Long Beach, California, U.S.
- Height: 6 ft 0 in (183 cm)

Sport
- College team: University of California Los Angeles
- Club: Los Angeles Athletic Club; Los Angeles, California
- Coached by: Eric Carnohan (Los Angeles Athletic Club); Adam Wright (UCLA); Dejan Udovicic (Olympics)
Medal record
Olympic Games
Bronze medal – third place	2024 Paris	Team

Ryder Michal Dodd (born January 19, 2006) is an American water polo player. He won a bronze medal in Water Polo representing the United States at the 2024 Summer Olympics. He was a student-athlete at UCLA, an attacker on the men's water polo team. On June 7, 2025, he was awarded the Peter J. Cutino Award as the best men's collegiate water polo player of the year for the 2024 season.

Dodd was born in Long Beach, California to Janet and Steve Dodd on January 19, 2006. His older brother Chase played water polo for UCLA. Ryder played water polo first for Huntington Beach High School from 2020 to 2021, and then from 2022 to 2024 for JSerra Catholic High School, a Catholic High School in San Juan Capistrano, California. During High School, he earned All American honors six times, while taking off his Senior High School year to train for the Olympics. While an age group competitor, he played for Vanguard Aquatics under Coach Sasa Branisavljevic, a Serbian native.

== 2024 Paris Olympic Bronze medal ==
Dodd represented the United States, winning a team bronze medal in Water Polo at the 2024 Summer Olympics in Paris. Dodd's brother Chase at 24, also made the U.S. team. The Serbian men's team, that had won the prior two Olympics in Water Polo, took the gold, with the Croatian Men's Water Polo team taking the Silver medal. In the semi-finals, the Serbian team defeated the American Men's Water Polo team 10-6, and defeated the Croatia in the final round, 13-11. The U.S. Men's Water Polo team's prior Olympic medal had been a silver at the 2008 Beijing Olympics, giving the U.S. men's team sixteen years prior to again taking the medal podium in 2024. Dodd was the youngest player on the U.S. team, and, as an important contributor, scored a total of eight goals during the Olympics.

=== International competition highlights ===
At the 2024 World Aquatics World Championships in Doha, Qatar, Dodd scored a total of seven goals, leading to a ranking of 9th place overall. With 28 points, in 2023, Dodd was a leading scorer at Santiago, Chile's 2023 Pan American games. At the July 2023 World Aquatics World Championships in Fukuoka, at 17, he scored a total of six goals to help lead the team to an overall seventh place ranking. scored six goals At the 2023 World Aquatics World Cup in Los Angeles, Dodd scored six goals helping to lead the team to a third place overall ranking. The American team, with Dodd's participation, placed second at the 2025 World Aquatics Men's U20 Water Polo Championships in Croatia in June 2025, and eighth in the World Aquatics Championships in Singapore in July 2025, with an eighth overall rank.

=== UCLA ===
Dodd attended the University of California Los Angeles and played with the Water Polo team under Head Coach Adam Wright who coached UCLA men's team after 2009 through at least 2025. In 2024 and 2025, Dodd was named the Mountain Pacific Sports Federation Conference (MPSF) Player of the Year. His UCLA team won the NCAA men's water polo championship in 2024. In 2024, at the NCAA Championship, Dodd was voted the most valuable player at the tournament, and the same year, made the All-Tournament NCAA First Team. Dodd was the winner of the Peter J. Cutino Award for 2024 and 2025 as the top male NCAA water polo player.
