= Toni Popadić =

Croatian water polo player (born 1994)

Personal information
- Nationality: Croatian
- Born: 5 November 1994 (age 32) Dubrovnik, Croatia
- Height: 205 cm (6 ft 9 in)
Medal record
Men's water polo
Representing Croatia
Olympic Games
Silver medal – second place	2024 Paris	Team

Toni Popadić (born 5 November 1994) is a Croatian water polo player. He represented Croatia at the 2024 Summer Olympics.
