= Andrea Fondelli =

Italian water polo player (born 1994)

Personal information
- Born: 27 February 1994 (age 32) Genoa, Italy
- Height: 193 cm (6 ft 4 in)
- Weight: 96 kg (212 lb)

Sport
- Sport: Water polo
- Club: Pro Recco
Medal record
Representing Italy
Olympic Games
Bronze medal – third place	2016 Rio de Janeiro	Team
World Championships
Silver medal – second place	2022 Budapest	Team
Silver medal – second place	2024 Doha	Team
European Championship
Bronze medal – third place	2014 Budapest
Bronze medal – third place	2024 Zagreb
World Cup
Silver medal – second place	2023 Los Angeles

Andrea Fondelli (born 27 February 1994) is an Italian professional water polo player. He was part of the Italian team at the 2016 Summer Olympics, where the team won the bronze medal.

== See also ==
- List of Olympic medalists in water polo (men)
