= Marko Vavic =

American water polo player (born 1999)

Personal information
- Full name: Marko Joseph Vavic
- Nationality: American
- Born: April 25, 1999 (age 27) Los Angeles, California, U.S.
- Height: 6 ft 6 in (1.98 m)
- Weight: 210 lb (95 kg)

Sport
- Sport: Water Polo
- Position: Driver (Perimeter Player) (WP)
- College team: University of Southern California
- Club: Trojan Water Polo Club; Italy's Roma Nuoto (Pro Team)
- Coached by: Jovan Vavic, Marko Pintarac (USC); Dejan Udovičić (Olympics)
Medal record
Men's water polo
Representing the United States
Olympic Games
Bronze medal – third place	2024 Paris	Team
World Cup
Bronze medal – third place	2023 Los Angeles
Pan American Games
Gold medal – first place	2019 Lima	Team

Marko Joseph Vavic (born April 25, 1999) is an American water polo player and 2024 Paris Olympic bronze medalist who competed for the University of Southern California. He participated in the 2020 Summer Olympics where the U.S. team placed sixth overall. He has played water polo for club and professional teams in Europe including Italy's Roma Nuoto.

== Early life ==
Marko Vavic was born April 25, 1999, to father Jovan Vavic, a water polo champion and coach, and Lisa Vavic in greater Los Angeles, California, growing up primarily in Rancho Palos Verdes. Vavic had dual citizenship with the U.S. and Montenegro where his father was born. From an athletic family that greatly valued the sport of water polo, he was one of four siblings, with brother Nicola, Stefan, and sister Monica all playing water polo for USC, and his father serving as a coach. He attended Loyola High School, an old, private, highly rated catholic college-prep school for boys in Los Angeles, where he competed in both swimming and water polo, and twice captured All-CIF honors as first team. He helped lead Loyola to the CIF semifinal championships in water polo in 2016 and 2015. As a swimmer, he was a California Interscholastic Champion in his Junior year, and placed second in his Senior year. As a water polo player, he was a Mission League Most Valuable player, and a Most Valuable Player on Defense. He was named an Athlete of the Year in 2017, while representing Loyola. In Club play, Vavic competed for the Trojan Water Polo Club.

== University of Southern California ==
Graduating with a degree in Business, Vavic attended the University of Southern California where he twice earned All-America honors in water polo and was coached in his Freshman year by his father Jovan Vavic, and throughout his tenure at USC by Marko Pintarac, a USC graduate who began coaching USC as an Associate Head Coach around 2015, and as an interim head coach by 2018-19. As a Freshman in 2017, Marko was USC's top scorer. In 2018, he was a Second team All-American for his second consecutive year, and made All-Mountain Pacific Sports Federation First team. His total of 57 goals placed him as the third highest scorer for the season. An important contributor, he was credited with a goal in the 2018-19 NCAA Championship title game. He did not compete as a Junior in 2019 to train, travel, and compete with the U.S. National team. In the 2020-21 season, he sat out spring 2021 in order to continue to train with the National team and to prepare for the 2020 Olympic games, which were actually held in 2021.

== 2020-24 Olympics ==
Vavic participated in the 2020 Tokyo Olympics where the U.S. men's water polo team finished sixth, with Serbia taking the gold, Greece taking the silver, and Hungary taking the bronze. Vavic scored a total of three goals in the men's water polo competition at the 2020 Tokyo Olympics.

He again represented the U.S. in the 2024 Paris Olympics where the U.S. team captured the bronze medal in the Men's Olympic water polo competition where he was managed by Head U.S. Water Polo Coach Dejan Udovičić. Serbia, a pre-game favorite performed well in its semi-final matches, and beat the U.S. team, 10-6, before capturing another close win against the team from Croatia in the finals with a score of 13-11. In the match for the bronze, the U.S. team defeated Hungary in a penalty shot to take the bronze and the team's first water polo medal since winning silver at the 2008 Beijing Olympics. Vavic scored a total of four goals in 2024 Olympic play.

In highlights of international play, at the 2025 World Aquatics Championships in Singapore, Vavic scored five times. At the Division I 2025 World Aquatics World Cup, he was credited with four goals, and in the World Aquatic Championships in Fukuoka, Japan, in 2023, he was credited with one point. At the 2023 World Aquatics World Cup in Los Angeles, he scored four goals.

=== European professional water polo ===
In professional water polo, Vavic has played for Italy's Savona, and for Barcelona in Spain. In Serbia, he has played for Partizan, and in better known professional play has competed for Italy's Roma Nuoto in the 2020-21 Serie A1 League, which has won the LEN Eurocup Title.
