= Konstantin Kharkov =

Croatian water polo player

Personal information
- Nationality: Russian / Croatian
- Born: 23 February 1997 (age 29) Moscow, Russia
- Height: 194 cm (76 in)

Sport
- Sport: Water polo
- Current club: VK Jadran Split

Senior clubs
- Years: Team
- 2015–2018: Shturm Ruza
- 2018–2021: HAVK Mladost
- 2021–2022: VK Jadran Split
- 2022–2023: AN Brescia
- 2023–2026: VK Jadran Split
- 2026–present: Olympiacos Piraeus
National team
- Years: Team
- 2018–2021: Russia
- 2022–present: Croatia
Medal record
Men's water polo
Representing Croatia
Olympic Games
Silver medal – second place	2024 Paris	Team
World Championships
Gold medal – first place	2024 Doha	Team
European Championship
Gold medal – first place	2022 Split
Silver medal – second place	2024 Zagreb
Representing Russia
Summer Universiade
Silver medal – second place	2017 Taipei	Team

Konstantin Kharkov (Russian: Константин Харьков; born 23 February 1997) is a Russian-born Croatian water polo player. He represented Croatia at the 2024 Summer Olympics.
