= Max Irving =

American water polo player (born 1995)

Personal information
- Full name: Maxwell Bruce Irving
- Nationality: American
- Born: May 21, 1995 (age 31) Long Beach, United States
- Height: 1.87 m (6 ft 2 in)
- Weight: 190 lb (86 kg)

Sport
- Sport: Swimming, Water polo
- Position: Likely Attacker/Driver; Perimeter player
- College team: University of California Los Angeles
- Club: Newport WP Club; Pro Recco, Italy; Olympiacos, Greece (Pro); Brescia, Telimar (Pro, Italy)
- Coached by: Marty Martinho (Long Beach Wilson); Adam Wright (UCLA); Dejan Udovičić (24 Olympics)
Medal record
Men's water polo
Representing the United States
Olympic Games
| Bronze medal – third place | 2024 Paris | Team |
World Cup
| Bronze medal – third place | 2023 Los Angeles | Team |
Pan American Games
| Gold medal – first place | 2019 Lima | Team |
| Gold medal – first place | 2023 Santiago | Team |

Maxwell Bruce Irving (born May 21, 1995) is an American water polo player who competed for UCLA. He participated in water polo at the 2020 Summer Olympics where the American team placed fifth, and later competed in the 2024 Olympic games where the American water polo team won the bronze medal. Summer Olympic Games.

== Early life ==
Max Irving was born the second of four siblings on May 21, 1995 to father Michael and mother Kelly Irving in Long Beach, California, in greater Los Angeles, where he grew up. From a family devoted to sports, his father Michael had worked as a basketball referee. He attended Long Beach Wilson High School, where he earned water polo varsity letters in three years, and was coached by Marty Martinho. He earned high school varsity letters in swimming as well under Coach Eric Berg, and was a team captain in 2012. In 2011-12, he earned First Team All California Interscholastic Federation Honors, and in 2012 earned All American First team honors. In club play, Irving played for the strong water polo program at the Newport Water Polo Club.

== University of California Los Angeles ==
Irving attended and played water polo played for the University of California Los Angeles where he was coached by Adam Wright, UCLA won the NCAA team championship in 2014, 2015, and 2017, though Irving was most strongly a part of the 2017 NCAA win. He earned First Team All-American honors in 2017, was an MPSF second team honoree. In 2015, he was the recipient of an All-MPSF Honorable Mentions, and was an All-American Third team honoree, and second most goals of any UCLA player. In 2014, he scored a total of 16 goals, attempting 32, giving his a 50 percent completion rate, and making his the 14th highest goals scorer on the team.

== Olympics ==
=== 2020 Tokyo ===
Irving competed in the 2020 Summer Olympics in Tokyo where the American water polo team placed fifth, Serbia won the gold, Greece won the silver, and Hungary won the bronze. A high scoring and important member of the U.S. team, Irving scored eight total goals at the 2020 Olympics.

=== 2024 Paris ===
He later competed in the 2024 Summer Olympics in Paris, under Coach Dejan Udovičić, where in an historic victory, the U.S. team won the bronze medal in the men's water polo team competition. Serbia, a pre-Olympic favorite, performed well in the semi-finals, defeating the U.S. team 10-6, leading to a match with Croatia in the final, where Serbia took the gold in a 13-11 gold medal win. In America's bronze medal match, the U.S. team defeated pre-game favorite Hungary in a penalty shootout, making it to the podium for the bronze medal for the first time since the U.S. team won silver at the 2008 Beijing Games. A valuable team member in Olympic play, Irving scored twelve goals at the 0224 Olympics.

=== International competition ===
He was named captain of the US National Team after the retirement of Ben Hallock.

In international competition highlights, he won a gold medal with the U.S. team at the 2023 Pan American Games in Santiago Chile, and a gold medal at the 2019 Pan American games in Lima, Peru. He earned a second place team silver medal at the 2022 FINA World League Super Final in Strasbourg, France and another silver second place medal at the 2017 FINA Intercontinental Tournament at the Gold Coast in Australia. Irving was also part of the U.S. team that won a Bronze medal at the 2015 World University Games in Gwangju, South Korea, where he was credited with six assists.

== Professional water polo ==
Irving played professionally in Europe after graduating from UCLA. He signed with Pro Recco of the Serie A1 in June of 2025 after a successful two year stint with AN Brescia where he helped deliver their second Coppa Italia (men's water polo) in club history. In February of 2026, Irving won his second Coppa Italia, this time with Pro Recco. He scored three goals in the game. He has played professional water polo with Olympiacos, Greece and with the Italian teams Brescia, and Telimar in Italy.
