= Vladimir Mišović =

Serbian water polo player (born 2001)

Personal information
- Nationality: Serbian
- Born: 15 September 2001 (age 24) Pančevo, Yugoslavia
- Height: 192 cm (6 ft 4 in)
Medal record
Men's water polo
Representing Serbia
Olympic Games
Gold medal – first place	2024 Paris	Team
Mediterranean Games
Bronze medal – third place	2026 Taranto	Team

Vladimir Mišović (born 15 September 2001) is a Serbian water polo player. He represented Serbia at the 2024 Summer Olympics.
