= Ben Hallock =

American water polo player (born 1997)

Personal information
- Full name: Benjamin Thomas Hallock
- Born: November 22, 1997 (age 28) Santa Barbara, California, U.S.
- Education: Harvard-Westlake School; Stanford University
- Height: 6 ft 6 in (198 cm)
- Weight: 245 lb (111 kg)

Sport
- Sport: Water Polo
- Position: Center Forward (WP)
- College team: Stanford University
- Coached by: Brian Flacks (Harvard-Westlake); John Vargas (Stanford)
Medal record
Men's water polo
Representing the United States
Olympic Games
Bronze medal – third place	2024 Paris	Team
World Cup
Bronze medal – third place	2023 Los Angeles
Pan American Games
Gold medal – first place	2019 Lima	Team

Benjamin Thomas "Ben" Hallock (/ˈhælɒk/ HAL-ok; born November 22, 1997) is an American professional water polo player. He is a 2024 Olympic Bronze medalist and a three-time Olympian (2016, 2020, 2024). Hallock was captain of the 2024 summer Olympics in Paris, France. He earned Total Water Polo Team of the Olympics, after scoring seven times during the tournament.

Hallock has established himself as "one of the strongest and most complete center forwards in the world", making a decisive contribution to the Italian powerhouse club Pro Recco from 2020 to 2025 including 3 Champion Leagues, 4 Scudetti, 4 Italian Cups and 1 Euro Cup.

Hallock played college water polo for the Stanford Cardinal, winning the NCAA Men’s Water Polo Championship in 2019. Hallock was awarded the Peter J. Cutino Award as the best collegiate water polo player of the year twice in 2018 and 2019. In 2026 Hallock was announced as the assistant coach of the Men’s water polo team at Stanford while he is attending Stanford GSB 2026/2027’.

== Early Career ==
Hallock played water polo at Harvard Westlake in Los Angeles where he was coached by Brian Flacks, and helped win CIF Championships in 2013 and 2014. He earned Southern California Player of the Year for both 2014 and 2015. He also played for Flacks at LAWPC and Premier WPC.

== Stanford University ==
Hallock played college water polo for Stanford under Head Coach John Vargas. . Hallock was named Captain the three years he played (2017, 2018, 2019). A three-time All-American at Stanford, twice earning both the Peter J Cutino Award and ACWPC National Player in 2018 and 2019. He led Stanford to the 2019 NCAA Championship and led the team in scoring with 73 goals. Hallock’s 194 career goals are the eighth most in program history, coming in just three years of competition. Hallock decided to forgo his senior season due to Covid-19 and signed a professional contract with Italian powerhouse, Pro Recco.

== International Career ==
Hallock participated in the (2016, 2020, and 2024) Olympic Games. At the 2016 Rio De Jainero Olympics, Hallock was the youngest player (18 years old) on the USA squad. He competed for Team USA in the 2020 Tokyo games (which took place in 2021). Hallock was named captain in 2024 and took home the Bronze medal. The hardware gave Team USA a medal in men’s water polo for the first time since 2008, and Hallock scored two goals in the third-place game.

Hallock Earned Total Water Polo Team of the Olympics, scoring 7 times in the tournament. Hallock has been coached by Dejan Udovicic for all three Olympics.

=== Professional water polo ===
Hallock, who plays the center forward position, competed for the Italian Water Polo Club Pro Recco, where he won 2 consecutive Champions League titles as one of the club's key players.
