= Marko Žuvela =

Croatian water polo player

Personal information
- Nationality: Croatian
- Born: 22 December 2001 (age 24) Dubrovnik, Croatia
- Height: 202 cm (6 ft 8 in)
Medal record
Men's water polo
Representing Croatia
Olympic Games
Silver medal – second place	2024 Paris	Team

Marko Žuvela (born 22 December 2001) is a Croatian water polo player. He represented Croatia at the 2024 Summer Olympics.
