= Dylan Woodhead =

American water polo player (born 1998)

Personal information
- Born: September 25, 1998 (age 28) San Anselmo, California, U.S.
- Height: 6 ft 7 in (2.01 m)
- Weight: 210 lb (95 kg)

Sport
- Sport: Water Polo
- Position: Defender; Usually Field Defender, Utility Player
- College team: Stanford University
- Coached by: John Vargas (Stanford); Dejan Udovičić (2024 Olympics)
Medal record
Men's water polo
Representing the United States
Olympic Games
Bronze medal – third place	2024 Paris	Team
World Cup
Bronze medal – third place	2023 Los Angeles
Pan American Games
Gold medal – first place	2023 Santiago	Team

Dylan Woodhead (born September 25, 1998) is an American water polo player who competed for Stanford University and participated in the 2020 Summer Olympics in Tokyo and in the 2024 Summer Olympics in Paris where the U.S. team won a bronze medal.

== Early life ==
Dylan Woodhead was born September 25, 1998 in San Anselmo, California to mother Laura and father Jeff Woodhead. Destined to be an athlete, his mother swam for Stanford, and his father rowed for the crew team at the University of California. Brother Quinn played water polo for Stanford, and sister Ella competed with the U.S. cadet team and also played water polo for Stanford. The three siblings grew up with a home pool, and played water basketball together. Under the training and management of Coach Matt Swanson, Dylan played water polo for San Anselmo's Drake High School, more recently known as Archie Williams High. Dylan's high school coach Matt Swanson had played water polo for UCLA, and was part of the UCLA team that won the NCAA team championship in 1995 and 1996. Swanson emphasized both swimming and water polo skills as a high school coach.

Woodhead was Varsity captain of his high school team at Drake in both 2014 and 2015, and was a CIF Division I honoree for first team in both 2014 and 2015. As a Senior, he led the Drake High team to a 29–1 record scoring 70 season goals, and being credited with 38 assists. For his achievements, in 2015, Woodhead was a Marin County Athletic League (MCAL) Player of the Year, and a Player of the Year for the Marin Independent Journal.

== Stanford University ==
Dylan attended and competed in Water Polo for Stanford University, where he was coached by John Vargas and graduated in 2020, with a major in mechanical engineering. In 2019, he helped lead Stanford's men's water polo to an NCAA national title. In addition to playing on the team that won the 2019 NCAA team championship title, Woodhead was a Mountain Pacific Sports Federation Conference team champion in both 2018 and 2019. A noteworthy and consistent scholar throughout his collegiate career, Woodhead received ACWPC honors as an All-Academic from 2016-2019, and was a Mountain Pacific Sports Federation All-Academic Athlete-Scholar from 2017-2019.

== Olympics ==
Woodhead participated in the 2020 Summer Olympics in Tokyo, where the U.S. men's Water Polo team placed sixth overall.

Woodhead later participated in the 2024 Summer Olympics in Paris, where the U.S. men's water polo team placed third in team competition, winning the bronze medal, and were coached by Dejan Udovicic. Serbia took the gold medal and the team from Croatia took the silver. In the preliminary rounds in 2024, the team from Serbia, a pre-Olympic favorite only won two of its first five preliminary games, but advanced as the last placed team to qualify. Serbia defeated the team from Greece in the important qualifiers by a score of 12-11, and teams from Spain and Italy also lost. Serbia had performed better in the semi-finals, and had beaten the United States by a score of 10-6 and faced Croatia in the final round to determine the gold and silver medals. Serbia won the gold and silver medal match against Croatia, thus giving Serbia the gold and Croatia the silver medal. In the match to determine the bronze medal, the U.S. team beat Hungary during penalty shots to win its first medal since taking the silver at the 2008 Beijing Olympics.
