= Loren Fatović =

Croatian water polo player

Personal information
- Nationality: Croatian
- Born: 16 November 1996 (age 29) Dubrovnik, Croatia
- Height: 1.86 m (6 ft 1 in)

Sport
- Sport: Water polo
- Handedness: Right
- Position: Field player
- Current club: VK Jadran Split

Senior clubs
- Years: Team
- –2023: VK Jug
- 2023–2026: VK Jadran Split
- 2026–present: Olympiacos Piraeus
National team
- Years: Team
- Croatia
Medal record
Men's water polo
Representing Croatia
Olympic Games
Silver medal – second place	2024 Paris	Team
World Championships
Gold medal – first place	2017 Budapest	Team
Gold medal – first place	2024 Doha	Team
Bronze medal – third place	2019 Gwanjgu	Team
European Championship
Gold medal – first place	2022 Split
Silver medal – second place	2024 Zagreb

Loren Fatović (born 16 November 1996) is a Croatian water polo player for Olympiacos Piraeus and the Croatian national team.

He participated at the 2017 World Championships and 2019 World Championships. Fatović also competed for Croatia at the 2020 Summer Olympics and 2024 Summer Olympics.

== Honours ==
Vk Jug

- Croatian championship: 2015–16, 2016–17, 2017–18, 2018–19, 2019–20, 2021–22
- Croatian Super Cup: 2022
- Croatian cup: 2015–16, 2016–17, 2017–18, 2018–19, 2022–23
- LEN Champions League: 2015–16
- Len supercup: 2016
- Regional waterpolo league: 2015–16, 2016–17, 2017–18, 2022–23

== See also ==
- List of world champions in men's water polo
- List of World Aquatics Championships medalists in water polo
