= Johnny Hooper (water polo) =

American water polo player (born 1997)

Personal information
- Full name: Jonathan Masashi Hooper
- Born: June 24, 1997 (age 29) Los Angeles, California, U.S.
- Occupations: Professional Water Polo; Business Management, Investment
- Height: 6 ft 2 in (1.88 m)
- Weight: 182 lb (83 kg)

Sport
- Sport: Water polo
- Position: Attacker (WP)
- College team: University of California Berkeley
- Club: Premier Water Polo Club
- Coached by: Kirk Everist (Berkeley); Brian Flacks (24 Olympics)
Medal record
Men's water polo
Representing the United States
Olympic Games
Bronze medal – third place	2024 Paris	Team
World Cup
Bronze medal – third place	2023 Los Angeles	Team
Pan American Games
Gold medal – first place	2019 Lima	Team
Gold medal – first place	2023 Santiago	Team

Jonathan Masashi Hooper (born June 24, 1997) is an American water polo player who competed for the University of California Berkeley and participated in the 2020 Summer Olympics in Tokyo and the 2024 Summer Olympics in Paris where the U.S. men's team won a bronze medal. Hooper played professional water polo in Europe, and worked in the investment field for Goldman Sachs and March Capital.

== Early life ==
Johnny Hooper was born in Los Angeles on June 24, 1997 to American father Gary Hooper and Japanese mother Mimi Hooper. He attended and played water polo representing Los Angeles's Harvard-Westlake School where he earned All American honors in four years, and was named a Division I Player of the year for the California Interscholastic Federation in 2015. Hooper was coached for a few years in water polo at Harvard-Westlake by Robert Lynn, a former 2000 Olympian who would serve as an Assistant Olympic Coach. He was on the Harvard-Westlake team that had the distinction of capturing two successive Southern Section Division I championships. In his Senior year, Harvard-Westlake had an unbeaten season.

In club play, he trained and competed for the Premier Water Polo Club where he earned honors as an All first team Junior Olympics player. He played with the Premier club in Junior Olympic competition at the ages of 12, 14, 16, and 18. The Los Angeles Daily News honored him as a 2014 Player of the Year.

== University of California, Berkeley ==
Hooper attended and played water polo for University of California, Berkeley from around 2014-2018 under Head Coach Kirk Everist where he helped lead the team to a Division I NCAA Championship in 2016. Hooper earned a B.S. in Business Administration at Berkeley. where he had a collegiate career total of 245 goals, making him one of the highest scorers in program history. At UC Berkeley, Hooper usually played as an attacker, a versatile utility position on offense that can alternate between driver, wing, and even hole-set or center. Though he spent much of his Senior year playing with the U.S. National Team, he earned Mountain Pacific Sports Federation (MPSF) honors as a Player of the Week twice in October. As a Sophomore in 2016, he was the recipient of First Team All-American honors, and earn All-Mountain Pacific Sports Federation honors. Hooper was a finalist for the 2018 Peter Cutino Award, which honors the best collegiate water polo player of the year. As a Freshman in 2015, he scored 74 goals, 75 as a Sophomore in 2016, 47 as a Junior in 2017, and 49 as a Senior in 2018.

== Olympics ==
Hooper played with the U.S. Water polo team at the 2020 Summer Olympics in Tokyo, where the U.S. team placed sixth under U.S. Head Olympic Coach Dejan Udovičić, with Serbia taking the gold, Greece taking the silver, and Hungary taking the bronze.

Four years later he played for the U.S. water polo team at the 2024 Summer Olympics in Paris, where he won a team bronze medal in the Olympic water polo team competition. Hooper was coached by Head Olympic Head Coach Brian Flacks. Serbia, a pre-Olympic favorite, performed well in the semi-finals, defeating the U.S. team 10-6, leading to a match with Croatia in the final, where Serbia took the gold in a 13-11 gold medal win. In America's bronze medal match, the U.S. team defeated Hungary in a penalty shootout, making it to the podium for the bronze medal for the first time since the team won silver at the 2008 Beijing Games. Hooper scored six goals in Olympic play in 2024.

=== Careers ===
He has played water polo professionally abroad for Palaio Faliro (Greece) and Telimar Palermo (Italy) from 2020-2024. After the 2020 Olympics in Tokyo, he worked for Goldman Sachs in San Francisco where he gained experience focusing on Mergers and Acquisitions, Initial Public Offerings, and financing. Ending his professional career in 2023-4, he worked for March Capital. To remain in condition, he has played water polo part time for the Olympic Club of the United States National League, and has considered training for the 2028 Summer Olympics in Los Angeles.

He has dated fashion model Summer Marshall.
