= Drew Holland =

American water polo player (born 1995)

Personal information
- Full name: Drew Lucas Holland
- Born: April 11, 1995 (age 31) Berkeley, California
- Height: 1.96 m (6 ft 5 in)
- Weight: 195 lb (88 kg)

Sport
- Sport: Water Polo
- Position: Goalkeeper (WP)
- College team: Stanford University
- Club: Lamorinda WP Club (09-13)
- Coached by: John Vargas (Stanford); Brian Flacks (24 Olympics)
Medal record
Men's water polo
Representing the United States
Olympic Games
Bronze medal – third place	2024 Paris	Team
World Cup
Bronze medal – third place	2023 Los Angeles	Team competition
Pan American Games
Gold medal – first place	2023 Santiago	Team competition

Drew Lucas Holland (born April 11, 1995) is an American water polo player and goalkeeper who competed for Stanford and participated in the 2020 Summer Olympics in Tokyo where the U.S. men's team placed sixth. At the 2024 Summer Olympics in Paris, he was part of the U.S. team that won the Bronze medal in the 2024 Olympic men's water polo team competition. He played professional water polo in Europe, and in the Fall of 2025, coached water polo at Miramonte High School, his alma mater.

Holland was born April 11, 1995 to Jeff and Alison Holland in Berkeley, California. Graduating in 2013, Drew attended Miramonte High School in Orinda, California where he competed on the swim team, and played water polo for two years. His two older brothers also competed in water polo. Brother Kent, who he may have emulated, played goalie for Miramonte High and later competed for Brown University. Holland's brother John played for Claremont McKenna College.

Competing for Miaramonte High, in 2009, 2011, and 2012 Drew was instrumental in leading the team to California Interscholastic Federation North Coast Section titles. In 2012, Holland was announced as the Most Outstanding Goalie for the Diablo Alliance League, and in 2011-12 received North Coast Section First team honors. In club water polo, Holland played for the Lamorinda Water Polo Club from 2009-13.

== Stanford University ==
Holland attended and played water polo for Stanford University under Head Coach John Vargas. During Holland's collegiate career, while playing goalkeeper he set a Stanford record for the most total saves at 925, and was an All-American four times. In 2017, he was a Third Team All-American, and was a recipient of ALL-MPSF honors, second team. He was an Honorable Mention All-American in 2015, and was announced as a Third Team All-American in 2014.

== Olympics ==
Holland participated with the U.S. team in the men's water polo competition at the 2020 Summer Olympics in Tokyo under Head Olympic water polo Coach Dejan Udovičić where the American team placed sixth overall. Serbia took the gold medal, Greece took the silver, and Hungary took the bronze. With strong play as a goalkeeper, Holland was credited with a total of 52 saves during the 2020 Olympic Games.

At the 2024 Summer Olympics in Paris, Drew won the bronze medal in the Men's Olympic water polo competition, where he was coached by Olympic Head Coach Brian Flacks. Serbia, a pre-Olympic favorite, performed well in the semi-finals, defeating the U.S. team 10-6, leading to a match with Croatia in the final, where Serbia took the gold in a 13-11 gold medal win. In America's bronze medal match, the U.S. team defeated Hungary in a penalty shootout, making it to the podium for the bronze medal for the first time since the team won silver at the 2008 Beijing Games.

=== Careers ===
Holland finished his career playing professionally for Telimar Waterpolo. In Greece, he played professionally for Peristeri and Chios, and in the 2018-19 season, played for Spain's Caballa.

Holland began serving as a Co-Head Coach at Miramonte High School in Orinda in the Fall of 2025.
