= Paris Aquatic Centre =

Aquatics centre in Saint-Denis, France

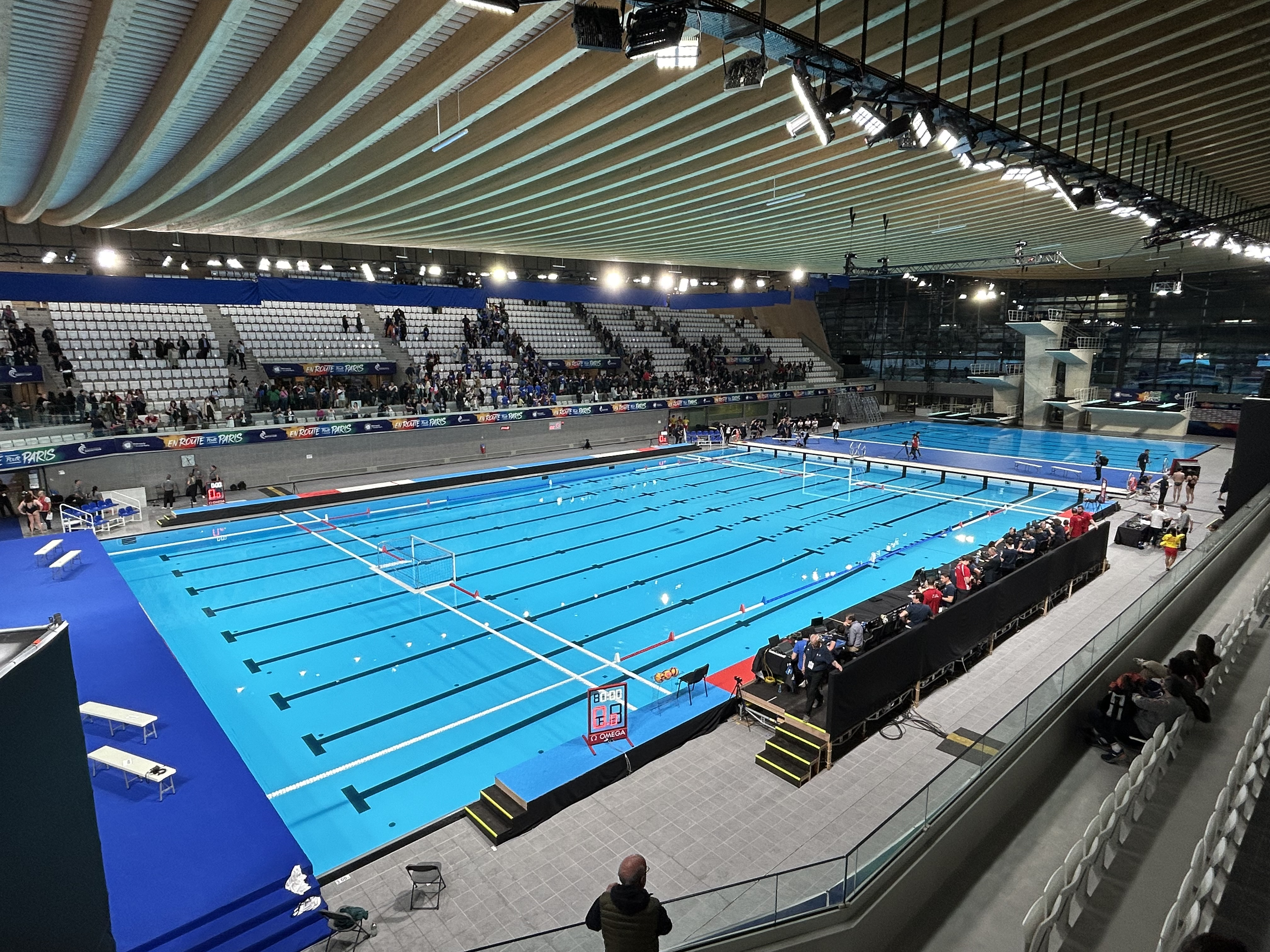
- Interactive map of Paris Aquatic Centre
- Location: 345 Av. du Président Wilson
- Coordinates: 48.9239°N 2.3561°E
- Capacity: 5,000

Construction
- Groundbreaking: 19 December 2017
- Opened: 4 April 2024
- Architects: VenhoevenCS, Ateliers 2/3/4/
- Builder: Bouygues Bâtiment Ile-de-France

Website
- Paris 2024 website

The Paris Olympic Aquatic Centre (French: Centre aquatique olympique) is an aquatic centre located in Saint-Denis, France that hosted numerous aquatic sporting events for the 2024 Summer Olympics in Paris. Located in the heart of the Plaine Saulnier, opposite the Stade de France, in which it is connected to by a footbridge spanning the A1 autoroute, it hosted the diving, water polo, and artistic swimming competitions. It was built under the management of the Métropole du Grand Paris.

== History ==
Paris Aquatic Centre in October 2025

As early as 2000, Aubervilliers was solicited for a redevelopment project related to the Paris 2012 Olympic Games bid on the site of the Fort d'Aubervilliers. Comprising five pools, including an outdoor one, it was to accommodate 15,000 spectators on removable stands.

The Paris 2024 Olympic Games bid relaunched the project. In June 2016, the public interest group in charge of the Paris 2024 bid decided to locate the Olympic aquatic centre in Saint-Denis on a site then occupied by Engie's research centre, located west of the Stade de France, separated from it by the Avenue du Président-Wilson. The project was launched in March 2017. In June 2017, the future aquatic centre was officially named the Olympic Aquatic Centre. The first stone was laid on 19 December 2017 in the presence of the President of the French Republic, Emmanuel Macron. As of October 2022, construction was underway.

The Paris Aquatic Centre was inaugurated on 4 April 2024. After the Olympics, the venue will reopen for public use in June 2025.

== Description ==
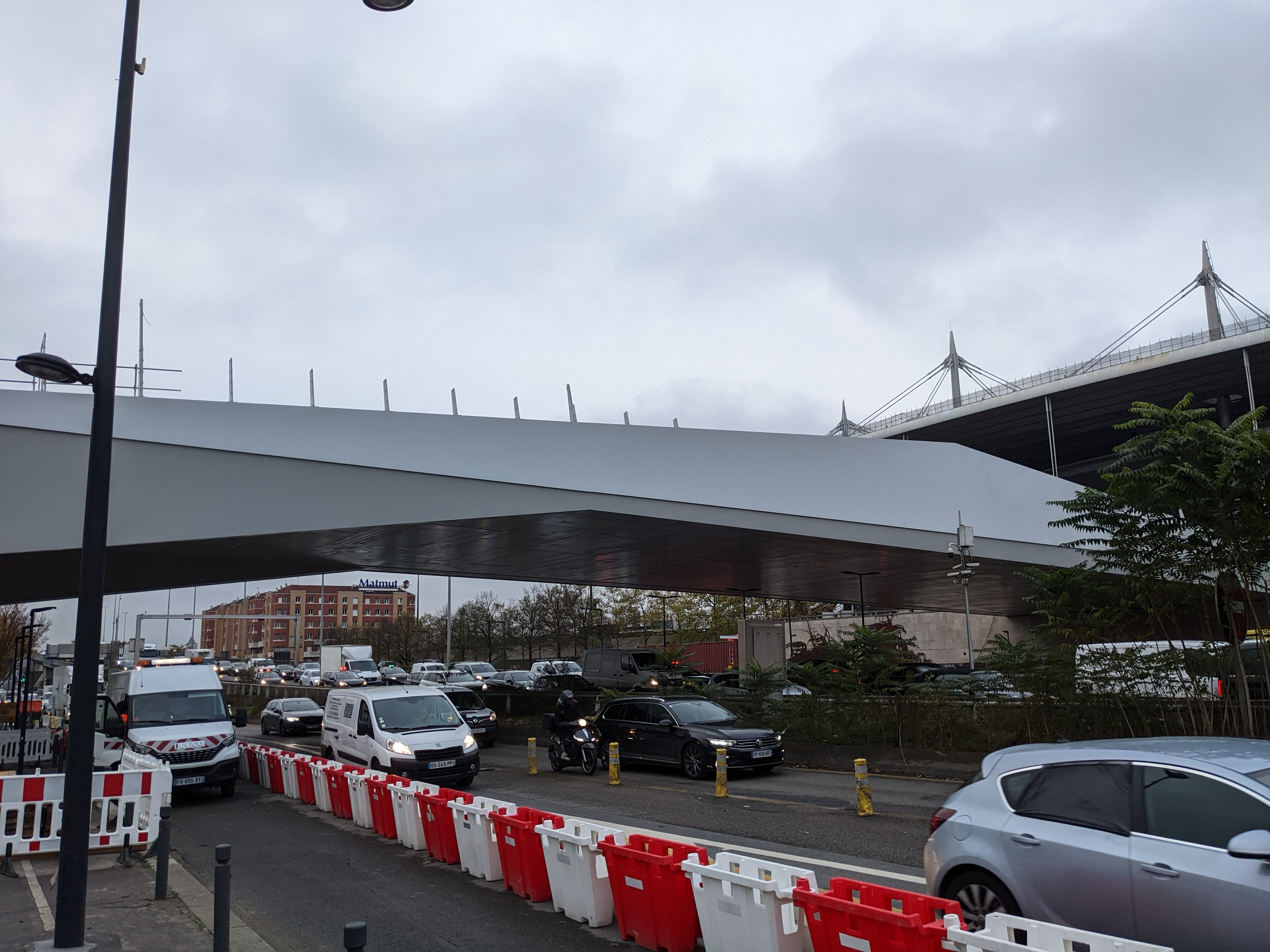
Footbridge in place to connect the two venues

The Olympic Aquatic Centre has a capacity of 5,000 for the Olympics, and will then be reduced to 2,500 following the Games. It was built on the site of the former research centre of Engie, in the Plaine Saint-Denis neighbourhood, west of the Stade de France. It is connected to the stadium by a footbridge spanning the A1 autoroute. The centre has two 50-metre pools, one of which is covered and the other open-air, as well as a diving pool and a water polo pool. It also has a spa and fitness area. The building was designed to be sustainable, including features like seats made of recycled plastic and shallower pools to limit the amount of energy needed for heating. After the Games, the centre will be used for high-level training, as well as for regional and national competitions. It will also be open to the general public. The centre is being built under the management of the Métropole du Grand Paris."

== See also ==
- Venues of the 2024 Summer Olympics and Paralympics
- Parc des sports de Marville
