= Jerko Marinić Kragić =

Croatian water polo player

Personal information
- Nationality: Croatian
- Born: 24 January 1991 (age 35) Split, Croatia, Yugoslavia
- Height: 191 cm (6 ft 3 in)
Medal record
Men's water polo
Representing Croatia
Olympic Games
Silver medal – second place	2024 Paris	Team

Jerko Marinić Kragić (born 24 January 1991) is a Croatian water polo player. He represented Croatia at the 2024 Summer Olympics.
