= Water polo at the 2019 World Aquatics Championships – Men's team rosters =

Team rosters of teams at the men's water polo tournament

These are the rosters of all participating teams at the men's water polo tournament at the 2019 World Aquatics Championships.

Age as of the start of the tournament, 15 July 2019.

Abbreviations
Pos.	Position	No.	Cap number
FP	Field player	GK	Goalkeeper
CF	Centre forward	CB	Centre back
FW	Forward	D	Defender

== Group A ==
=== Greece ===
The following is the Greek roster.

Head coach: Thodoris Vlachos

№	Name	Pos.	Height	Weight	L/R	Date of birth	Club
1	Emmanouil Zerdevas	GK	1.83 m (6 ft 0 in)			12 August 1997 (aged 21)	
2	Konstantinos Genidounias	FP	1.82 m (6 ft 0 in)			3 May 1993 (aged 26)	
3	Dimitrios Skoumpakis	FP	2.02 m (6 ft 8 in)			18 December 1998 (aged 20)	
4	Alexandros Papanastasiou	FP	1.88 m (6 ft 2 in)			12 February 1990 (aged 29)	
5	Ioannis Fountoulis (C)	FP	1.86 m (6 ft 1 in)			25 May 1988 (aged 31)	
6	Marios Kapotsis	FP	1.83 m (6 ft 0 in)			13 September 1991 (aged 27)	
7	Georgios Dervisis	FP	1.95 m (6 ft 5 in)			30 October 1994 (aged 24)	
8	Stylianos Argyropoulos	FP	1.86 m (6 ft 1 in)			2 August 1996 (aged 22)	
9	Konstantinos Mourikis	FP	1.97 m (6 ft 6 in)			11 July 1988 (aged 31)	
10	Christodoulos Kolomvos	FP	1.86 m (6 ft 1 in)			26 October 1988 (aged 30)	
11	Alexandros Gounas	FP	1.79 m (5 ft 10 in)			3 October 1989 (aged 29)	
12	Angelos Vlachopoulos	FP	1.80 m (5 ft 11 in)			29 September 1991 (aged 27)	
13	Konstantinos Galanidis	GK	2.02 m (6 ft 8 in)			1 September 1990 (aged 28)	

=== Montenegro ===
The following is the Montenegrin roster.

Head coach: Vladimir Gojković

№	Name	Pos.	Height	Weight	L/R	Date of birth	Club
1	Dejan Lazović	GK	1.98 m (6 ft 6 in)			8 February 1990 (aged 29)	
2	Draško Brguljan (C)	FP	1.94 m (6 ft 4 in)			27 December 1984 (aged 34)	
3	Đuro Radović	FP				20 February 1990 (aged 29)	
4	Marko Petković	FP				3 March 1989 (aged 30)	
5	Uroš Čučković	FP	2.00 m (6 ft 7 in)			25 April 1990 (aged 29)	
6	Aleksa Ukropina	FP	1.96 m (6 ft 5 in)			28 September 1998 (aged 20)	
7	Mlađan Janović	FP	1.91 m (6 ft 3 in)			11 June 1984 (aged 35)	
8	Bogdan Đurđić	FP	1.84 m (6 ft 0 in)			8 August 1996 (aged 22)	
9	Aleksandar Ivović	FP	1.95 m (6 ft 5 in)			24 February 1986 (aged 33)	
10	Vladan Spaić	FP				18 June 1997 (aged 22)	
11	Dragan Drašković	FP				1 September 1988 (aged 30)	
12	Nikola Murišić	FP	1.88 m (6 ft 2 in)			16 August 1992 (aged 26)	
13	Slaven Kandić	GK	1.97 m (6 ft 6 in)			2 April 1991 (aged 28)	

=== Serbia ===
The following is the Serbian roster.

Head coach: Dejan Savić

№	Name	Pos.	Height	Weight	L/R	Date of birth	Club
1	Strajo Rističević	GK				7 November 1992 (aged 26)	
2	Dušan Mandić	FP	2.02 m (6 ft 8 in)			16 June 1994 (aged 25)	(Italy) Pro Recco
3	Viktor Rašović	FP	1.90 m (6 ft 3 in)			13 August 1993 (aged 25)	(Hungary) Szolnoki Vízilabda
4	Sava Ranđelović	FP	1.93 m (6 ft 4 in)			17 July 1993 (aged 25)	
5	Miloš Ćuk (C)	FP	1.90 m (6 ft 3 in)			21 December 1990 (aged 28)	(Croatia) HAVK Mladost
6	Đorđe Lazić	FP				19 May 1996 (aged 23)	
7	Nemanja Vico	FP				19 November 1994 (aged 24)	(Italy) Pallanuoto Trieste
8	Nikola Dedović	FP				25 January 1990 (aged 29)	(Serbia) VK Partizan
9	Nikola Jakšić	FP	1.97 m (6 ft 6 in)			17 January 1997 (aged 22)	(Hungary) Ferencvárosi TC
10	Radomir Drašović	FP				22 July 1997 (aged 21)	(Hungary) Szolnoki Vízilabda
11	Ognjen Stojanović	FP				27 April 1996 (aged 23)	
12	Strahinja Rašović	FP				9 March 1992 (aged 27)	(Hungary) Egri VK
13	Lazar Dobožanov	GK				21 December 1995 (aged 23)	

=== South Korea ===
The following is the South Korean roster.

Head coach: Go Ki-mura

№	Name	Pos.	Height	Weight	L/R	Date of birth	Club
1	Lee Jin-woo	GK				19 March 1997 (aged 22)	
2	Kim Dong-hyeok	FP				15 January 1996 (aged 23)	
3	Kim Byeong-ju	FP				23 December 1998 (aged 20)	
4	Lee Seon-uk (C)	FP				23 November 1987 (aged 31)	
5	Gwon Dae-yong	FP				16 December 1995 (aged 23)	
6	Lee Seong-gyu	FP				23 November 1997 (aged 21)	
7	Gwon Yeong-gyun	FP				19 November 1987 (aged 31)	
8	Kim Moon-soo	FP				2 February 1994 (aged 25)	
9	Chu Min-jong	FP				6 July 1992 (aged 27)	
10	Han Hyo-min	FP				12 September 1998 (aged 20)	
11	Seo Kang-won	FP				16 March 1997 (aged 22)	
12	Song Jae-hoon	FP				20 January 1996 (aged 23)	
13	Jung Byeong-young	GK				2 July 1997 (aged 22)	

== Group B ==
=== Australia ===
The following is the Australian roster.

Head coach: Elvis Fatović

№	Name	Pos.	Height	Weight	L/R	Date of birth	Club
1	Joel Dennerley	GK	1.94 m (6 ft 4 in)		R	25 June 1987 (aged 32)	(Australia) UNSW Wests Magpies
2	Richard Campbell	FP	1.93 m (6 ft 4 in)			18 September 1987 (aged 31)	
3	George Ford	CB	1.92 m (6 ft 4 in)		R	24 February 1993 (aged 26)	(Australia) UWA Torpedoes
4	Joe Kayes	CF	1.99 m (6 ft 6 in)		R	3 January 1991 (aged 28)	(Australia) ACU Cronulla Sharks
5	Nathan Power	CB	2.00 m (6 ft 7 in)		R	13 February 1993 (aged 26)	(Australia) UNSW Wests Magpies
6	Lachlan Edwards	CF	1.96 m (6 ft 5 in)		R	6 February 1995 (aged 24)	(United States) USC Trojans
7	Aidan Roach	FP	1.86 m (6 ft 1 in)		R	7 September 1990 (aged 28)	(Australia) Drummoyne Devils
8	Aaron Younger (C)	CB	1.93 m (6 ft 4 in)		R	25 September 1991 (aged 27)	(Australia) Fremantle Mariners
9	Andrew Ford	FP	1.89 m (6 ft 2 in)		R	21 April 1995 (aged 24)	(Australia) UWA Torpedoes
10	Timothy Putt	FP			R	6 November 1998 (aged 20)	
11	Rhys Howden	FP	1.88 m (6 ft 2 in)		R	2 April 1987 (aged 32)	(Australia) Brisbane Barracudas
12	Blake Edwards	FP	1.88 m (6 ft 2 in)		R	14 February 1992 (aged 27)	(United States) USC Trojans
13	Anthony Hrysanthos	GK			R	28 November 1995 (aged 23)	(Australia) Sydney University Lions

=== Croatia ===
The following is the Croatian roster.

Head coach: Ivica Tucak

№	Name	Pos.	Height	Weight	L/R	Date of birth	Club
1	Marko Bijač	GK	2.01 m (6 ft 7 in)			12 January 1991 (aged 28)	
2	Marko Macan	FP	1.95 m (6 ft 5 in)			26 April 1993 (aged 26)	
3	Loren Fatović	FP				16 November 1996 (aged 22)	
4	Luka Lončar	FP	1.95 m (6 ft 5 in)			26 June 1987 (aged 32)	
5	Maro Joković	FP	2.03 m (6 ft 8 in)			1 October 1987 (aged 31)	
6	Hrvoje Benić	FP				26 April 1992 (aged 27)	
7	Ante Vukičević	FP	1.86 m (6 ft 1 in)			24 February 1993 (aged 26)	
8	Andro Bušlje (C)	FP	2.00 m (6 ft 7 in)			4 January 1986 (aged 33)	
9	Lovre Miloš	FP				5 April 1994 (aged 25)	
10	Josip Vrlić	FP	1.96 m (6 ft 5 in)			25 April 1986 (aged 33)	
11	Anđelo Šetka	FP	1.86 m (6 ft 1 in)			14 September 1985 (aged 33)	
12	Xavier García	FP	1.98 m (6 ft 6 in)			5 January 1984 (aged 35)	
13	Ivan Marcelić	GK	1.90 m (6 ft 3 in)			18 February 1994 (aged 25)	

=== Kazakhstan ===
The following is the Kazakh roster.

Head coach: Dejan Stanojević

№	Name	Pos.	Height	Weight	L/R	Date of birth	Club
1	Pavel Lipilin	GK				11 July 1999 (aged 20)	
2	Yevgeniy Medvedev	FP	1.86 m (6 ft 1 in)			9 August 1985 (aged 33)	
3	Maxim Zhardan	FP	1.85 m (6 ft 1 in)			24 July 1995 (aged 23)	
4	Roman Pilipenko	FP	1.87 m (6 ft 2 in)			24 December 1987 (aged 31)	
5	Miras Aubakirov	FP				20 October 1996 (aged 22)	
6	Altay Altayev	FP				14 February 1996 (aged 23)	
7	Murat Shakenov (C)	FP	1.83 m (6 ft 0 in)			23 September 1990 (aged 28)	
8	Yegor Berbelyuk	FP				24 November 1996 (aged 22)	
9	Stanislav Shvedov	FP				24 November 1998 (aged 20)	
10	Mikhail Ruday	FP	1.92 m (6 ft 4 in)			4 May 1988 (aged 31)	
11	Ravil Manafov	FP	1.94 m (6 ft 4 in)			22 June 1985 (aged 34)	
12	Yulian Verdesh	FP				19 June 1996 (aged 23)	
13	Valeriy Shlemov	GK	1.87 m (6 ft 2 in)			20 September 1995 (aged 23)	

=== United States ===
The following is the American roster.

Head coach: Dejan Udovičić

№	Name	Pos.	Height	Weight	L/R	Date of birth	Club
1	Alex Wolf	GK	6 ft 7 in (2.01 m)	220 lb (100 kg)		April 19, 1997 (aged 22)	(United States) UCLA Bruins
2	Johnny Hooper	FW	6 ft 1 in (1.85 m)	195 lb (88 kg)	R	June 24, 1997 (aged 22)	
3	Marko Vavic	FW	6 ft 5 in (1.96 m)	210 lb (95 kg)		April 25, 1999 (aged 20)	(United States) USC Trojans
4	Alex Obert	D	6 ft 6 in (1.98 m)	225 lb (102 kg)		December 18, 1991 (aged 27)	
5	Ben Hallock	FW	6 ft 6 in (1.98 m)	245 lb (111 kg)		November 22, 1997 (aged 21)	(United States) Stanford Cardinal
6	Luca Cupido	FW	6 ft 4 in (1.93 m)	210 lb (95 kg)		November 9, 1995 (aged 23)	(Italy) Pro Recco
7	Hannes Daube	FW	6 ft 4 in (1.93 m)	225 lb (102 kg)	R	January 5, 2000 (aged 19)	(United States) USC Trojans
8	Matthew Farmer	FP				June 17, 1995 (aged 24)	
9	Alex Bowen	FW	6 ft 5 in (1.96 m)	220 lb (100 kg)	R	September 4, 1993 (aged 25)	(Hungary) Miskolci VLC
10	Chancellor Ramirez	D	6 ft 1 in (1.85 m)	205 lb (93 kg)	R	October 1, 1994 (aged 24)	(Greece) GS Apollon Smyrni
11	Jesse Smith (C)	FP	6 ft 4 in (1.93 m)	240 lb (110 kg)	R	April 27, 1983 (aged 36)	
12	Max Irving	FW	6 ft 0 in (1.83 m)	180 lb (82 kg)	R	May 21, 1995 (aged 24)	
13	Drew Holland	GK	6 ft 5 in (1.96 m)	175 lb (79 kg)		April 11, 1995 (aged 24)	(Spain) CN Caballa

== Group C ==
=== Hungary ===
The following is the Hungarian roster.

Head coach: Tamás Märcz

№	Name	Pos.	Height	Weight	L/R	Date of birth	Club
1	Viktor Nagy	GK	1.98 m (6 ft 6 in)	82 kg (181 lb)		24 July 1984 (aged 34)	(Hungary) Szolnoki Vízilabda
2	Dániel Angyal	FP	2.03 m (6 ft 8 in)	108 kg (238 lb)		29 March 1992 (aged 27)	(Hungary) Szolnoki Vízilabda
3	Krisztián Manhercz	FW	1.85 m (6 ft 1 in)	87 kg (192 lb)		6 February 1997 (aged 22)	(Hungary) Orvosegyetem SC
4	Gergő Zalánki	FW	1.93 m (6 ft 4 in)	90 kg (200 lb)		26 February 1995 (aged 24)	(Hungary) Szolnoki Vízilabda
5	Márton Vámos	FW	1.99 m (6 ft 6 in)	106 kg (234 lb)		24 June 1992 (aged 27)	(Hungary) Ferencváros TC
6	Tamás Mezei	FW	1.97 m (6 ft 6 in)	108 kg (238 lb)		14 September 1990 (aged 28)	(Hungary) Ferencváros TC
7	Tamás Sedlmayer	FP				6 January 1995 (aged 24)	(Hungary) Ferencvárosi TC
8	Szilárd Jansik	FP				6 April 1994 (aged 25)	(Hungary) Ferencváros TC
9	Zoltán Pohl	FP	1.94 m (6 ft 4 in)	98 kg (216 lb)		27 March 1995 (aged 24)	(Hungary) Ferencváros TC
10	Dénes Varga (C)	FW	1.93 m (6 ft 4 in)	97 kg (214 lb)		29 March 1987 (aged 32)	(Hungary) Ferencváros TC
11	Bence Bátori	FW	1.93 m (6 ft 4 in)	100 kg (220 lb)		28 December 1991 (aged 27)	(Hungary) Szolnoki Vízilabda
12	Balázs Hárai	FW	2.02 m (6 ft 8 in)	101 kg (223 lb)		5 April 1987 (aged 32)	(Hungary) Orvosegyetem SC
13	Soma Vogel	GK	1.98 m (6 ft 6 in)	76 kg (168 lb)		7 July 1997 (aged 22)	(Hungary) Ferencváros TC

=== New Zealand ===
The following is the New Zealand roster.

Head coach: Davor Carevic

№	Name	Pos.	Height	Weight	L/R	Date of birth	Club
1	Sid Dymond	GK				15 November 1994 (aged 24)	(New Zealand) Waitakere Blue Devils
2	Matthew Lewis	FP				31 October 1994 (aged 24)	(New Zealand) Marist Magic
3	Rowan Brown	FP				9 October 2000 (aged 18)	(New Zealand) North Harbour Turtles
4	Ryan Pike	CF				27 June 1997 (aged 22)	(New Zealand) Marist Magic
5	Nicholas Stankovich	FW			L	14 November 1998 (aged 20)	(New Zealand) Waitakere Blue Devils
6	Matthew Small (C)	FW			R	2 April 1993 (aged 26)	(New Zealand) Marist Magic
7	Anton Sunde	FW			R	13 February 1996 (aged 23)	(New Zealand) Waitakere Blue Devils
8	Joshua Potaka	FP				1 May 1987 (aged 32)	(New Zealand) Marist Magic
9	Sean Bryant	FP				30 November 1993 (aged 25)	(New Zealand) Hutt Heat
10	Matthew Bryant	CB			R	15 February 1991 (aged 28)	(New Zealand) Hutt Heat
11	Louis Clark	CF			R	21 August 2001 (aged 17)	(New Zealand) Canterbury Water Polo
12	Sean Newcombe	FW			R	20 October 1994 (aged 24)	(New Zealand) Waitakere Blue Devils
13	Bae Fountain	GK				10 January 2001 (aged 18)	(New Zealand) Tauranga Body In Motion

=== South Africa ===
The following is the South African roster.

Head coach: Paul Martin

№	Name	Pos.	Height	Weight	L/R	Date of birth	Club
1	Madi Lwazi	GK				12 December 1994 (aged 24)	
2	Etienne Le Roux (C)	FP	1.84 m (6 ft 0 in)			18 December 1987 (aged 31)	
3	Timothy Rezelman	FP				13 January 1995 (aged 24)	
4	Nardus Badenhorst	FP	1.98 m (6 ft 6 in)			26 August 1990 (aged 28)	
5	Ethan Coryndon-Baker	FP				23 July 1999 (aged 19)	
6	Sven van Zyl	FP				28 August 1998 (aged 20)	
7	Jason Evezard	FP				17 August 1997 (aged 21)	
8	Nicholas Rodda	FP	1.89 m (6 ft 2 in)			11 October 1992 (aged 26)	
9	Dylan Cronje	FP				11 June 1998 (aged 21)	
10	Mark Spencer	FP				6 July 1991 (aged 28)	
11	Liam Neill	FP				26 October 1997 (aged 21)	
12	Donn Stewart	FP	1.91 m (6 ft 3 in)			22 August 1980 (aged 38)	
13	Keegan Clark	GK				1 February 1999 (aged 20)	

=== Spain ===
The following is the Spanish roster.

Head coach: David Martín

№	Name	Pos.	Height	Weight	L/R	Date of birth	Club
1	Daniel López	GK	1.91 m (6 ft 3 in)			16 July 1980 (aged 38)	
2	Alberto Munarriz	FP	1.95 m (6 ft 5 in)			19 May 1994 (aged 25)	
3	Álvaro Granados	FP				8 October 1998 (aged 20)	
4	Miguel del Toro	FP				16 August 1993 (aged 25)	
5	Sergi Cabañas	FP				10 February 1996 (aged 23)	
6	Marc Larumbe	FP				30 May 1994 (aged 25)	
7	Alberto Barroso	FP	1.81 m (5 ft 11 in)			8 July 1994 (aged 25)	
8	Francisco Fernández	FP				21 June 1986 (aged 33)	
9	Roger Tahull	FP	1.96 m (6 ft 5 in)			11 May 1997 (aged 22)	
10	Felipe Perrone (C)	FP	1.83 m (6 ft 0 in)			27 February 1986 (aged 33)	
11	Blai Mallarach	FP	1.87 m (6 ft 2 in)			21 August 1987 (aged 31)	
12	Alejandro Bustos	FP	1.94 m (6 ft 4 in)			17 March 1997 (aged 22)	
13	Eduardo Lorrio	GK	1.93 m (6 ft 4 in)			25 September 1993 (aged 25)	

== Group D ==
=== Brazil ===
The following is the Brazilian roster.

Head coach: Rick Azavedo

№	Name	Pos.	Height	Weight	L/R	Date of birth	Club
1	Slobodan Soro (C)	GK	1.97 m (6 ft 6 in)			23 December 1978 (aged 40)	
2	Logan Cabral	FP				27 September 1994 (aged 24)	
3	Pedro Real	FP				29 May 1996 (aged 23)	
4	Gustavo Coutinho	FP	1.84 m (6 ft 0 in)			11 December 1991 (aged 27)	
5	Roberto Freitas	FP	1.93 m (6 ft 4 in)			3 April 1997 (aged 22)	
6	Guilherme Almeida	FP	1.94 m (6 ft 4 in)			10 January 1990 (aged 29)	
7	Rafael Real	FP				27 April 1999 (aged 20)	
8	Heitor Carrulo	FP	1.81 m (5 ft 11 in)			28 January 1989 (aged 30)	
9	Bernardo Rocha	FP	1.88 m (6 ft 2 in)			3 July 1989 (aged 30)	
10	Rudá Franco	FP	1.84 m (6 ft 0 in)			25 July 1986 (aged 32)	
11	Gustavo Guimarães	FP	1.86 m (6 ft 1 in)			24 January 1994 (aged 25)	
12	Luis Ricardo Silva	FP	1.85 m (6 ft 1 in)			24 March 1998 (aged 21)	
13	João Pedro Fernandes	GK				16 March 2000 (aged 19)	

=== Germany ===
The following is the German roster.

Head coach: Hagen Stamm

№	Name	Pos.	Height	Weight	L/R	Date of birth	Club
1	Moritz Schenkel	GK	2.00 m (6 ft 7 in)			4 September 1990 (aged 28)	
2	Ben Reibel	FP				27 August 1997 (aged 21)	
3	Timo van der Bosch	FP	1.92 m (6 ft 4 in)			29 November 1993 (aged 25)	
4	Julian Real (C)	FP	2.00 m (6 ft 7 in)			22 December 1989 (aged 29)	
5	Tobias Preuss	FP				3 August 1988 (aged 30)	
6	Maurice Jüngling	FP	1.84 m (6 ft 0 in)			6 October 1991 (aged 27)	
7	Dennis Strelezkij	FP				22 April 1998 (aged 21)	
8	Luuk Gielen	FP				26 November 1990 (aged 28)	
9	Marko Stamm	FP	1.86 m (6 ft 1 in)			26 November 1988 (aged 30)	
10	Mateo Ćuk	FP				21 February 1990 (aged 29)	
11	Marin Restović	FP				22 July 1990 (aged 28)	
12	Dennis Eidner	FP	1.80 m (5 ft 11 in)			4 August 1989 (aged 29)	
13	Kevin Götz	GK	1.90 m (6 ft 3 in)			3 February 1993 (aged 26)	

=== Italy ===
The following is the Italian roster.

Head coach: Alessandro Campagna

№	Name	Pos.	Height	Weight	L/R	Date of birth	Club
1	Marco Del Lungo	GK	1.90 m (6 ft 3 in)			1 March 1990 (aged 29)	
2	Francesco Di Fulvio	FP	1.88 m (6 ft 2 in)			15 August 1993 (aged 25)	
3	Stefano Luongo	FP	1.80 m (5 ft 11 in)			5 January 1990 (aged 29)	
4	Pietro Figlioli (C)	FP	1.92 m (6 ft 4 in)			29 May 1984 (aged 35)	
5	Edoardo Di Somma	FP				30 September 1996 (aged 22)	
6	Alessandro Velotto	FP	1.85 m (6 ft 1 in)			12 February 1995 (aged 24)	
7	Vincenzo Renzuto	FP	1.85 m (6 ft 1 in)			8 April 1993 (aged 26)	
8	Gonzalo Echenique	FP				27 April 1990 (aged 29)	
9	Niccolò Figari	FP				24 January 1988 (aged 31)	
10	Michaël Bodegas	FP				3 May 1987 (aged 32)	
11	Matteo Aicardi	FP	1.92 m (6 ft 4 in)			19 April 1986 (aged 33)	
12	Vincenzo Dolce	FP				11 May 1995 (aged 24)	
13	Gianmarco Nicosia	GK				12 February 1998 (aged 21)	

=== Japan ===
The following is the Japanese roster.

Head coach: Yoji Omoto

№	Name	Pos.	Height	Weight	L/R	Date of birth	Club
1	Katsuyuki Tanamura	GK	1.84 m (6 ft 0 in)			3 August 1989 (aged 29)	
2	Seiya Adachi	FP	1.72 m (5 ft 8 in)			24 June 1995 (aged 24)	
3	Harukiirario Koppu	FP				28 December 1998 (aged 20)	
4	Mitsuaki Shiga	FP	1.77 m (5 ft 10 in)			16 September 1991 (aged 27)	
5	Yoshida Takuma	FP				11 October 1994 (aged 24)	
6	Atsuto Iida	FP	1.81 m (5 ft 11 in)			24 December 1993 (aged 25)	
7	Yusuke Shimizu	FP	1.81 m (5 ft 11 in)			7 September 1988 (aged 30)	
8	Mitsuru Takata	FP				8 December 1995 (aged 23)	
9	Atsushi Arai	FP	1.69 m (5 ft 7 in)			3 February 1994 (aged 25)	
10	Yusuke Inaba	FP				11 April 2000 (aged 19)	
11	Keigo Okawa (C)	FP	1.83 m (6 ft 0 in)			11 March 1990 (aged 29)	
12	Kenta Araki	FP				6 April 1995 (aged 24)	
13	Tomoyoshi Fukushima	GK	1.77 m (5 ft 10 in)			3 June 1993 (aged 26)	
