= 2018 FINA Men's Water Polo World Cup =

- League: FINA Water Polo World Cup
- Sport: Water polo
- Duration: 11 – 18 September

Super Final
- Finals champions: Hungary
- Runners-up: Australia

FINA Water Polo World Cup seasons
- ← 2014 2023 →

The 16th edition of the Men's FINA Water Polo World Cup were held in Berlin, Germany from September 11 to September 16, 2018. Like the final tournament of the 2007 FINA Men's Water Polo World League all matches were contested in the Europasportpark swimming pool.

== Format ==
8 teams qualified for the 2018 FINA World Cup. They were split into two groups of 4 teams. After playing a Round-robin every team advanced to the quarterfinals. The best ranked team of Group A played against the fourth ranked team of Group B, the second ranked team of Group A against the third ranked team of Group B the third ranked team of Group A against the second ranked team of Group B and the fourth ranked team of Group A against the best ranked team of Group B. The winners of those quarterfinals advanced to the Semis and played out the champion while the losers of the quarterfinals competed in placement matches.

== Teams ==
The top eight teams from the previous world championship are no longer qualified. Now only the top three teams from the previous world championship qualify, with one guest per continent (the highest-ranked team from the previous world championship).

Teams	Qualified as
Germany; Croatia; Hungary; Serbia (European Host); United States; Australia; Japan; South Africa	Host; 1st 2017 World Championship; 2nd 2017 World Championship; 3rd 2017 World Championship; 1st European team at 2017 World Championship; 1st American team at 2017 World Championship; 1st Oceanian team at 2017 World Championship; 1st Asian team at 2017 World Championship; 1st African team at 2017 World Championship

== Groups ==
Group A	Group B
Hungary; Germany (H); Australia; Japan	Croatia; Serbia; United States; South Africa

== Preliminary round ==
All times are local (UTC+2).

=== Group A ===
Pos	Team	Pld	W	D	L	GF	GA	GD	Pts	Qualification
1	Germany (H)	3	2	0	1	35	29	+6	4	Quarterfinals
2	Hungary	3	2	0	1	38	34	+4	4	Quarterfinals
3	Australia	3	2	0	1	32	24	+8	4	Quarterfinals
4	Japan	3	0	0	3	29	47	−18	0	Quarterfinals

Source: FINA
(H) Hosts

11 September 2018; 19:00	Report	Australia	14–6	Japan	Berlin, Germany; Referees: Boris Margeta (SLO), Vojin Putniković (SRB)
11 September 2018; 19:00	Report	Score by quarters: 3–0, 3–0, 5–5, 3–1			Berlin, Germany; Referees: Boris Margeta (SLO), Vojin Putniković (SRB)
11 September 2018; 19:00	Report	Younger 4	Goals	Arai 3	Berlin, Germany; Referees: Boris Margeta (SLO), Vojin Putniković (SRB)

11 September 2018; 20:30	Report	Germany	12–10	Hungary	Berlin, Germany; Referees: Francesc Buch (ESP), Michael Goldenberg (USA)
11 September 2018; 20:30	Report	Score by quarters: 1–2, 3–4, 4–2, 4–2			Berlin, Germany; Referees: Francesc Buch (ESP), Michael Goldenberg (USA)
11 September 2018; 20:30	Report	Real, Reibel 3	Goals	Bátori 3	Berlin, Germany; Referees: Francesc Buch (ESP), Michael Goldenberg (USA)

12 September 2018; 16:00	Report	Australia	8–9	Hungary	Berlin, Germany; Referees: Viktor Salnichenko (KAZ), Dragan Štampalija (CRO)
12 September 2018; 16:00	Report	Score by quarters: 2–3, 1–2, 3–4, 2–0			Berlin, Germany; Referees: Viktor Salnichenko (KAZ), Dragan Štampalija (CRO)
12 September 2018; 16:00	Report	three players 2	Goals	Manhercz 4	Berlin, Germany; Referees: Viktor Salnichenko (KAZ), Dragan Štampalija (CRO)

12 September 2018; 20:30	Report	Germany	14–9	Japan	Berlin, Germany; Referees: Georgios Stavridis (GRE), Dion Willis (RSA)
12 September 2018; 20:30	Report	Score by quarters: 3–4, 3–1, 3–3, 5–1			Berlin, Germany; Referees: Georgios Stavridis (GRE), Dion Willis (RSA)
12 September 2018; 20:30	Report	Eidner 4	Goals	Arai 3	Berlin, Germany; Referees: Georgios Stavridis (GRE), Dion Willis (RSA)

13 September 2018; 19:00	Report	Hungary	19–14	Japan	Berlin, Germany; Referees: Francesc Buch (ESP), Michael Goldenberg (USA)
13 September 2018; 19:00	Report	Score by quarters: 8–3, 3–3, 3–4, 5–4			Berlin, Germany; Referees: Francesc Buch (ESP), Michael Goldenberg (USA)
13 September 2018; 19:00	Report	Zalánki 5	Goals	Adachi, Inaba 3	Berlin, Germany; Referees: Francesc Buch (ESP), Michael Goldenberg (USA)

13 September 2018; 20:30	Report	Germany	9–10	Australia	Berlin, Germany; Referees: Vojin Putniković (SRB), Dragan Štampalija (CRO)
13 September 2018; 20:30	Report	Score by quarters: 1–2, 3–3, 3–3, 1–2			Berlin, Germany; Referees: Vojin Putniković (SRB), Dragan Štampalija (CRO)
13 September 2018; 20:30	Report	three players 2	Goals	Kayes 5	Berlin, Germany; Referees: Vojin Putniković (SRB), Dragan Štampalija (CRO)

=== Group B ===
Pos	Team	Pld	W	D	L	GF	GA	GD	Pts	Qualification
1	Serbia	3	2	1	0	45	21	+24	5	Quarterfinals
2	Croatia	3	2	1	0	50	22	+28	5	Quarterfinals
3	United States	3	1	0	2	33	35	−2	2	Quarterfinals
4	South Africa	3	0	0	3	11	61	−50	0	Quarterfinals

Source: FINA

11 September 2018; 15:45	Report	Serbia	21–3	South Africa	Berlin, Germany; Referees: Victor Salnichenko (KAZ), Axel Bender (GER)
11 September 2018; 15:45	Report	Score by quarters: 4–1, 5–0, 7–0, 5–2			Berlin, Germany; Referees: Victor Salnichenko (KAZ), Axel Bender (GER)
11 September 2018; 15:45	Report	Subotić 6	Goals	Spencer 2	Berlin, Germany; Referees: Victor Salnichenko (KAZ), Axel Bender (GER)

11 September 2018; 17:15	Report	Croatia	15–10	United States	Berlin, Germany; Referees: Georgios Stavridis (GRE), György Kun (HUN)
11 September 2018; 17:15	Report	Score by quarters: 3–2, 4–2, 3–3, 5–3			Berlin, Germany; Referees: Georgios Stavridis (GRE), György Kun (HUN)
11 September 2018; 17:15	Report	Vukičević 4	Goals	Bowen 3	Berlin, Germany; Referees: Georgios Stavridis (GRE), György Kun (HUN)

12 September 2018; 17:30	Report	Serbia	14–8	United States	Berlin, Germany; Referees: Francesc Buch (ESP), Daniel Flahive (AUS)
12 September 2018; 17:30	Report	Score by quarters: 6–3, 3–1, 3–0, 2–4			Berlin, Germany; Referees: Francesc Buch (ESP), Daniel Flahive (AUS)
12 September 2018; 17:30	Report	Mandić 5	Goals	three players 2	Berlin, Germany; Referees: Francesc Buch (ESP), Daniel Flahive (AUS)

12 September 2018; 19:00	Report	Croatia	25–2	South Africa	Berlin, Germany; Referees: Tadao Tahara (JPN), Axel Bender (GER)
12 September 2018; 19:00	Report	Score by quarters: 7–1, 6–1, 5–0, 7–0			Berlin, Germany; Referees: Tadao Tahara (JPN), Axel Bender (GER)
12 September 2018; 19:00	Report	Bašić 9	Goals	Prout, Rodda 1	Berlin, Germany; Referees: Tadao Tahara (JPN), Axel Bender (GER)

13 September 2018; 16:00	Report	Serbia	10–10	Croatia	Berlin, Germany; Referees: Boris Margeta (SLO), Axel Bender (GER)
13 September 2018; 16:00	Report	Score by quarters: 2–4, 3–2, 3–3, 2–1			Berlin, Germany; Referees: Boris Margeta (SLO), Axel Bender (GER)
13 September 2018; 16:00	Report	Stojanović 4	Goals	Vukičević 3	Berlin, Germany; Referees: Boris Margeta (SLO), Axel Bender (GER)

13 September 2018; 17:30	Report	South Africa	6–15	United States	Berlin, Germany; Referees: György Kun (HUN), Tadao Tahara (JPN)
13 September 2018; 17:30	Report	Score by quarters: 0–5, 2–3, 1–5, 3–2			Berlin, Germany; Referees: György Kun (HUN), Tadao Tahara (JPN)
13 September 2018; 17:30	Report	Evezard 2	Goals	Irwing 4	Berlin, Germany; Referees: György Kun (HUN), Tadao Tahara (JPN)

== Knockout stage ==
=== Bracket ===
Quarterfinals
14 September
Hungary	10
United States	8
14 September
Japan	7
Serbia	12
14 September
Australia	9
Croatia	8
14 September
Germany	24
South Africa	5

Semifinals
15 September
Hungary	12
Serbia	11
15 September
Australia (PSO)	11
Germany	10

Final
16 September
Hungary	10
Australia	4
Third place
16 September
Serbia	15
Germany	9

=== 5–8th place ===
5–8th place semifinals
15 September
United States	11
Japan	10
15 September
Croatia	16
South Africa	3

Fifth place
16 September
United States	7
Croatia	10
Seventh place
16 September
Japan	21
South Africa	9

=== Quarterfinals ===
14 September 2018; 16:00	Report	Hungary	10–8	United States	Berlin, Germany; Referees: Boris Margeta (SLO), Daniel Flahive (AUS)
14 September 2018; 16:00	Report	Score by quarters: 5–2, 1–1, 3–3, 1–2			Berlin, Germany; Referees: Boris Margeta (SLO), Daniel Flahive (AUS)
14 September 2018; 16:00	Report	Bátori 3	Goals	three players 2	Berlin, Germany; Referees: Boris Margeta (SLO), Daniel Flahive (AUS)

14 September 2018; 17:30	Report	Australia	9–8	Croatia	Berlin, Germany; Referees: Georgios Stavridis (GRE), Michael Goldenberg (USA)
14 September 2018; 17:30	Report	Score by quarters: 1–1, 4–4, 2–2, 2–1			Berlin, Germany; Referees: Georgios Stavridis (GRE), Michael Goldenberg (USA)
14 September 2018; 17:30	Report	Kayes 3	Goals	Vrlić 3	Berlin, Germany; Referees: Georgios Stavridis (GRE), Michael Goldenberg (USA)

14 September 2018; 19:00	Report	Japan	7–12	Serbia	Berlin, Germany; Referees: Francesc Buch (ESP), Dion Willis (RSA)
14 September 2018; 19:00	Report	Score by quarters: 3–2, 2–6, 1–3, 1–1			Berlin, Germany; Referees: Francesc Buch (ESP), Dion Willis (RSA)
14 September 2018; 19:00	Report	Okawa 4	Goals	Mandić 4	Berlin, Germany; Referees: Francesc Buch (ESP), Dion Willis (RSA)

14 September 2018; 20:30	Report	Germany	24–5	South Africa	Berlin, Germany; Referees: Victor Salnichenko (KAZ), György Kun (HUN)
14 September 2018; 20:30	Report	Score by quarters: 7–3, 5–1, 7–0, 5–1			Berlin, Germany; Referees: Victor Salnichenko (KAZ), György Kun (HUN)
14 September 2018; 20:30	Report	Jüngling 5	Goals	Evezard 2	Berlin, Germany; Referees: Victor Salnichenko (KAZ), György Kun (HUN)

=== 5–8th place semifinals ===
15 September 2018; 14:00	Report	United States	11–10	Japan	Berlin, Germany; Referees: Francesc Buch (ESP), Daniel Flahive (AUS)
15 September 2018; 14:00	Report	Score by quarters: 3–2, 2–3, 4–3, 2–2			Berlin, Germany; Referees: Francesc Buch (ESP), Daniel Flahive (AUS)
15 September 2018; 14:00	Report	Bowen 5	Goals	Adachi 4	Berlin, Germany; Referees: Francesc Buch (ESP), Daniel Flahive (AUS)

15 September 2018; 15:30	Report	Croatia	16–3	South Africa	Berlin, Germany; Referees: Axel Bender (GER), Vojin Putniković (SRB)
15 September 2018; 15:30	Report	Score by quarters: 5–2, 4–0, 2–1, 5–0			Berlin, Germany; Referees: Axel Bender (GER), Vojin Putniković (SRB)
15 September 2018; 15:30	Report	Bašić 4	Goals	Spencer 2	Berlin, Germany; Referees: Axel Bender (GER), Vojin Putniković (SRB)

=== Semifinals ===
15 September 2018; 17:00	Report	Hungary	12–11	Serbia	Berlin, Germany; Referees: Georgios Stavridis (GRE), Dragan Štampalija (CRO)
15 September 2018; 17:00	Report	Score by quarters: 1–3, 5–3, 3–3, 3–2			Berlin, Germany; Referees: Georgios Stavridis (GRE), Dragan Štampalija (CRO)
15 September 2018; 17:00	Report	Bátori 3	Goals	Subotić 3	Berlin, Germany; Referees: Georgios Stavridis (GRE), Dragan Štampalija (CRO)

15 September 2018; 18:30	Report	Australia	11–10 (PSO)	Germany	Berlin, Germany; Referees: Boris Margeta (SLO), Dion Willis (RSA)
15 September 2018; 18:30	Report	Score by quarters: 3–2, 1–2, 3–3, 1–1 PSO: 3–2			Berlin, Germany; Referees: Boris Margeta (SLO), Dion Willis (RSA)
15 September 2018; 18:30	Report	Younger 3	Goals	Jüngling 3	Berlin, Germany; Referees: Boris Margeta (SLO), Dion Willis (RSA)

=== Seventh place game ===
16 September 2018; 10:00	Report	Japan	21–9	South Africa	Berlin, Germany; Referees: Francesc Buch (ESP), Axel Bender (GER)
16 September 2018; 10:00	Report	Score by quarters: 4–1, 9–2, 4–3, 4–3			Berlin, Germany; Referees: Francesc Buch (ESP), Axel Bender (GER)
16 September 2018; 10:00	Report	Inaba 5	Goals	Rabie 4	Berlin, Germany; Referees: Francesc Buch (ESP), Axel Bender (GER)

=== Fifth place game ===
16 September 2018; 11:30	Report	United States	7–10	Croatia	Berlin, Germany; Referees: Vojin Putniković (SRB), György Kun (HUN)
16 September 2018; 11:30	Report	Score by quarters: 0–1, 1–4, 2–3, 4–2			Berlin, Germany; Referees: Vojin Putniković (SRB), György Kun (HUN)
16 September 2018; 11:30	Report	three players 2	Goals	Fatović 3	Berlin, Germany; Referees: Vojin Putniković (SRB), György Kun (HUN)

=== Bronze medal game ===
16 September 2018; 13:00	Report	Serbia	15–9	Germany	Berlin, Germany; Referees: Dion Willis (RSA), Michael Goldenberg (USA)
16 September 2018; 13:00	Report	Score by quarters: 6–2, 3–2, 3–2, 3–3			Berlin, Germany; Referees: Dion Willis (RSA), Michael Goldenberg (USA)
16 September 2018; 13:00	Report	Vico 4	Goals	Real 3	Berlin, Germany; Referees: Dion Willis (RSA), Michael Goldenberg (USA)

=== Gold medal game ===
16 September 2018; 14:30	Report	Hungary	10–4	Australia	Berlin, Germany; Referees: Boris Margeta (SLO), Georgios Stavridis (GRE)
16 September 2018; 14:30	Report	Score by quarters: 2–1, 2–1, 4–0, 2–2			Berlin, Germany; Referees: Boris Margeta (SLO), Georgios Stavridis (GRE)
16 September 2018; 14:30	Report	Manhercz 4	Goals	four players 1	Berlin, Germany; Referees: Boris Margeta (SLO), Georgios Stavridis (GRE)

== Final standings ==
Rank	Team
Gold medal	Hungary
Silver medal	Australia
Bronze medal	Serbia
4	Germany
5	Croatia
6	United States
7	Japan
8	South Africa

2018 FINA Men's Water Polo World Cup

Hungary
Fourth title

=== Top goalscorers ===
Rank	Name	Goals	Shots	%
1	(Serbia) Gavril Subotić	17	27	63.0%
2	(Croatia) Andrija Bašić	16	19	84.2%
3	(Serbia) Dušan Mandić	15	32	46.9%
3	(Japan) Keigo Okawa	15	44	34.1%
5	(Germany) Julian Real	14	28	50.0%
5	(Hungary) Bence Bátori	14	29	48.3%
5	(Hungary) Gergő Zalánki	14	37	37.8%
8	(Australia) Joe Kayes	13	25	52.0%
8	(Japan) Seiya Adachi	13	34	38.2%

Source: FINA - Leading Scorers

== Individual awards ==
- Best Player
  - Aaron Younger (AUS)
- Best Goalscorer
  - Gavril Subotić (SRB)
- Best Goalkeeper
  - Joel Dennerley (AUS)

== Squads ==
=== Australia ===
- Joel Dennerley
- Richard Campbell
- George Ford
- Joe Kayes
- Nathan Power
- Lachlan Edwards
- Lachlan Hollis
- Aaron Younger
- Andrew Ford
- Timothy Putt
- Rhys Howden
- Blake Edwards
- Anthony Hrysanthos

Head coach:

- Elvis Fatović

=== Germany ===
- Moritz Schenkel
- Ben Reibel
- Timo van der Bosch
- Julian Real
- Tobias Preuss
- Maurice Jüngling
- Denis Strelezkij
- Hannes Schuls
- Marko Stamm
- Mateo Ćuk
- Marin Restović
- Dennis Eidner
- Kevin Götz

Head coach:

- Hagen Stamm

=== Hungary ===
- Gergely Kardos
- Szilárd Jansik
- Krisztián Manhercz
- Gergő Zalánki
- Toni Német
- Tamás Mezei
- Dávid Jansik
- Gergő Kovács
- Ádám Nagy
- Bence Bátori
- Mátyás Pásztor
- Zoltán Pohl
- Soma Vogel

Head coach:

- Tamás Märcz

=== Japan ===
- Katsuyuki Tanamura
- Seiya Adachi
- Harukiirario Koppu
- Toi Suzuki
- Takuma Yoshida
- Atsuto Ilda
- Mitsuru Takata
- Atsushi Arai
- Kohei Inaba
- Keigo Okawa
- Kenta Araki
- Tomoyoshi Fukushima

Head coach:

- Yoji Omoto

=== Croatia ===
- Marko Bijač
- Marko Macan
- Loren Fatović
- Luka Lončar
- Andrija Bašić
- Hrvoje Benić
- Ante Vukičević
- Andro Bušlje
- Lovre Miloš
- Josip Vrlić
- Anđelo Šetka
- Xavier García
- Ivan Marcelić

Head coach:

- Ivica Tucak

=== Serbia ===
- Strajo Dimitrije Rističević
- Dušan Mandić
- Viktor Rašović
- Sava Ranđelović
- Gavril Subotić
- Đorđe Lazić
- Nemanja Vico
- Radomir Drašović
- Nikola Jakšić
- Mateja Asanović
- Ognjen Stojanović
- Strahinja Rašović
- Lazar Dobožanov

Head coach:

- Dejan Savić

=== South Africa ===
- Lwazi Madi
- Miguel Morais
- Chris Brown
- Ethan James Jagger Coryndon-Baker
- Garreth Prout
- Nic Downes
- Lood Rabie
- Nicholas Rodda
- Cameron Laurenson
- Mark Spencer
- Jason Evezard
- Donn Stewart

Head coach:

- Paul Martin

=== United States ===
- McQuin Baron
- Johnathan Masashi Hooper
- Dylan Woodhead
- Alex Obert
- Ben Hallock
- Luca Cupido
- Nick Carniglia
- Alex Roelse
- Alex Bowen
- Benjamin Dutch Stevenson
- Jesse Smith
- Maxwell Bruce Irving
- Jack William Turner

Head coach:

- Dejan Udovičić
