= Water polo at the 2022 World Aquatics Championships – Men's team rosters =

This article shows the roster of all participating teams at the men's water polo tournament at the 2022 World Aquatics Championships.

== Group A ==
=== Brazil ===
The following is Brazilian roster in the Water polo at the 2022 World Aquatics Championships – Men's tournament.

Head coach: (Cuba) Bárbaro Díaz

- 1 Guilherme Barrella GK
- 2 Logan Cabral CB
- 3 Filipe Lacerda CB
- 4 Gustavo Coutinho D
- 5 Roberto Freitas D
- 6 Marcos Paulo Pedroso CF
- 7 Rafael Real D
- 8 Eduardo De Paula D
- 9 Bruno Chiappini CB
- 10 Italo Vizacre D
- 11 Gustavo Guimarães D
- 12 Luis Ricardo Silva CF
- 13 Alexandre Mendes GK

=== Georgia ===
The following is Georgian roster in the Water polo at the 2022 World Aquatics Championships – Men's tournament.

Head coach: (Serbia) Dejan Stanojević

- 1 Irakli Razmadze GK
- 2 Sandro Adeishvili D
- 3 Valiko Dadvani FP
- 4 Nika Shushiashvili FP
- 5 Andria Bitadze CF
- 6 Marko Jelaca FP
- 7 Khvicha Jakhaia CB
- 8 Jovan Sarić FP
- 9 Revaz Imnaishvili FP
- 10 Boris Vapenski FP
- 11 Fabio Baraldi CB
- 12 Dušan Vasić FP
- 13 Nikoloz Shubladze GK

=== Hungary ===
The following is Hungarian roster in the Water polo at the 2022 World Aquatics Championships – Men's tournament.

Head coach: Tamás Märcz

- 1 Márton Lévai GK
- 2 Dániel Angyal CB
- 3 Krisztián Manhercz FP
- 4 Zoltán Pohl CB
- 5 Márton Vámos D
- 6 Tamás Mezei CF
- 7 Gergő Zalánki D
- 8 Gergely Burián D
- 9 Ádám Nagy CB
- 10 Dénes Varga FP
- 11 Szilárd Jansik D
- 12 Balázs Hárai CF
- 13 Soma Vogel GK

=== Montenegro ===
The following is Montenegrin roster in the Water polo at the 2022 World Aquatics Championships – Men's tournament.

Head coach: Vladimir Gojković

- 1 Dejan Lazović GK
- 2 Marko Mršić FP
- 3 Uroš Vučurović FP
- 4 Konstantin Averka FP
- 5 Uroš Čučković CB
- 6 Vlado Popadić FP
- 7 Vasilije Radović FP
- 8 Bogdan Đurđić FP
- 9 Miroslav Perković CB
- 10 Dušan Banićević CF
- 11 Dušan Matković FP
- 12 Marko Petković FP
- 13 Petar Tešanović GK

== Group B ==
=== Croatia ===
The following is Croatian roster in the Water polo at the 2022 World Aquatics Championships – Men's tournament.

Head coach: Ivica Tucak

- 1 Marko Bijač GK
- 2 Rino Burić FP
- 3 Loren Fatović FP
- 4 Ivan Krapić FP
- 5 Franko Lazić FP
- 6 Luka Bukić FP
- 7 Ante Vukičević FP
- 8 Marko Žuvela FP
- 9 Jerko Marinić Kragić FP
- 10 Josip Vrlić FP
- 11 Andrija Bašić FP
- 12 Konstantin Kharkov FP
- 13 Toni Popadić GK

=== Germany ===
The following is German roster in the Water polo at the 2022 World Aquatics Championships – Men's tournament.

Head coach: (Montenegro) Petar Porobić

- 1 Moritz Schenkel GK
- 2 Zoran Božić CB
- 3 Ferdinand Korbel CF
- 4 Jan Rotermund CB
- 5 Fynn Schütze FP
- 6 Maurice Jüngling CB
- 7 Dennis Strelezkij D
- 8 Lukas Küppers FP
- 9 Philipp Dolff CB
- 10 Phillip Kubisch FP
- 11 Niclas Schipper CF
- 12 Mark Gansen D
- 13 Kevin Götz GK

=== Greece ===
The following is Greek roster in the Water polo at the 2022 World Aquatics Championships – Men's tournament.

Head coach: Thodoris Vlachos

- 1 Emmanouil Zerdevas GK
- 2 Konstantinos Genidounias FP
- 3 Dimitrios Skoumpakis FP
- 4 Efstathios Kalogeropoulos FP
- 5 Ioannis Fountoulis FP
- 6 Alexandros Papanastasiou FP
- 7 Georgios Dervisis FP
- 8 Stylianos Argyropoulos FP
- 9 Konstantinos Gouvis FP
- 10 Konstantinos Kakaris CF
- 11 Dimitrios Nikolaidis CF
- 12 Angelos Vlachopoulos FP
- 13 Panagiotis Tzortzatos GK

=== Japan ===
The following is Japanese roster in the Water polo at the 2022 World Aquatics Championships – Men's tournament.

Head coach: Yoshinori Shiota

- 1 Katsuyuki Tanamura GK
- 2 Seiya Adachi FP
- 3 Taiyo Watanabe FP
- 4 Daichi Ogihara FP
- 5 Yuki Maita FP
- 6 Toi Suzuki FP
- 7 Kiyomu Date FP
- 8 Mitsuru Takata FP
- 9 Atsushi Arai FP
- 10 Yusuke Inaba FP
- 11 Keigo Okawa FP
- 12 Kenta Araki FP
- 13 Tomoyoshi Fukushima GK

== Group C ==
=== Canada ===
The following is Canadian roster in the Water polo at the 2022 World Aquatics Championships – Men's tournament.

Head coach: Patrick Oaten

- 1 Milan Radenović GK
- 2 Gaelan Geddes Patterson D
- 3 Bogdan Djerković CB
- 4 Nicolas Constantin-Bicari CF
- 5 Matt Halajian D
- 6 Jérémie Blanchard CB
- 7 Jeremie Cote D
- 8 Sean Spooner D
- 9 Aleksa Gardijan CF
- 10 Aria Soleimanipak D
- 11 Jason O'Donnell D
- 12 Reuel D'Souza D
- 13 Brody McKnight GK

=== Italy ===
The following is Italian roster in the Water polo at the 2022 World Aquatics Championships – Men's tournament.

Head coach: Alessandro Campagna

- 1 Marco Del Lungo GK
- 2 Francesco Di Fulvio D
- 3 Luca Damonte D
- 4 Matteo Iocchi Gratta CB
- 5 Andrea Fondelli D
- 6 Giacomo Cannella D
- 7 Luca Marziali CF
- 8 Gonzalo Echenique D
- 9 Nicholas Presciutti CB
- 10 Lorenzo Bruni CF
- 11 Edoardo Di Somma CB
- 12 Vincenzo Dolce CB
- 13 Gianmarco Nicosia GK

=== South Africa ===
The following is South African roster in the Water polo at the 2022 World Aquatics Championships – Men's tournament.

Head coach: Vaughn Marlow

- 1 Lwazi Madi GK
- 2 Ignardus Badenhorst FP
- 3 Niall Wheeler FP
- 4 Todd James Howard FP
- 5 Farouk Mayman FP
- 6 Roarke Olver FP
- 7 Cameron Bain Laurenson FP
- 8 Dane Tucker FP
- 9 Dylan Cronje FP
- 10 Ross Stuart Stone FP
- 11 Chad Roman FP
- 12 Jonathan Swanepoel FP
- 13 Lonwabo Mfikili GK

=== Spain ===
The following is Spanish roster in the Water polo at the 2022 World Aquatics Championships – Men's tournament.

Head coach: David Martín

- 1 Unai Aguirre GK
- 2 Alberto Munárriz FP
- 3 Álvaro Granados FP
- 4 Bernat Sanahuja FP
- 5 Miguel de Toro CF
- 6 Marc Larumbe FP
- 7 Martin Famera FP
- 8 Sergi Cabanas FP
- 9 Roger Tahull CF
- 10 Felipe Perrone FP
- 11 Blai Mallarach FP
- 12 Alejandro Bustos FP
- 13 Eduardo Lorrio GK

== Group D ==
=== Australia ===
The following is Australian roster in the Water polo at the 2022 World Aquatics Championships – Men's tournament.

Head coach: Tim Hamill

- 1 Nick Porter GK
- 2 Keenan Marsden D
- 3 George Ford CB
- 4 Charlie Negus D
- 5 Nathan Power CB
- 6 Tom McJannett CF
- 7 Luke Pavillard D
- 8 Rhys Holden D
- 9 Reilly Townsend D
- 10 Timothy Putt CB
- 11 Chaz Poot D
- 12 Blake Edwards D
- 13 John Hedges GK

=== Kazakhstan ===
The following is Kazakh roster in the Water polo at the 2022 World Aquatics Championships – Men's tournament.

Head coach: Rustam Ukumanov

- 1 Madikhan Makhmetov GK
- 2 Eduard Tsoy FP
- 3 Anatoliy Pustovalov FP
- 4 Srđan Vuksanović FP
- 5 Maxim Lamayev FP
- 6 Danil Artyukh FP
- 7 Murat Shakenov FP
- 8 Yegor Berbelyuk FP
- 9 Ruslan Akhmetov FP
- 10 Alexey Shmider FP
- 11 Timur Khassanov FP
- 12 Sultan Shonzhigitov FP
- 13 Pavel Lipilin GK

=== Serbia ===
The following is Serbian roster in the Water polo at the 2022 World Aquatics Championships – Men's tournament.

Head coach: Dejan Savić

- 1 Lazar Dobožanov GK
- 2 Dušan Mandić FP
- 3 Gavril Subotić FP
- 4 Sava Ranđelović FP
- 5 Đorđe Lazić CF
- 6 Nemanja Vico CF
- 7 Strahinja Rašović FP
- 8 Nikola Lukić FP
- 9 Nikola Jakšić FP
- 10 Marko Radulović FP
- 11 Radomir Drašović FP
- 12 Viktor Rašović FP
- 13 Branislav Mitrović GK

=== United States ===
The following is American roster in the Water polo at the 2022 World Aquatics Championships – Men's tournament.

Head coach: (Serbia) Dejan Udovičić

- 1 Adrian Weinberg GK
- 2 Chase Dodd FP
- 3 Marko Vavić FP
- 4 Thomas Gruwell FP
- 5 Hannes Daube FP
- 6 Jake Ehrhardt FP
- 7 Ben Hallock CF
- 8 Dylan Woodhead FP
- 9 Alexander Bowen FP
- 10 Benjamin Stevenson FP
- 11 Matthew Farmer CF
- 12 Maxwell Irving FP
- 13 Drew Holland GK
