= Japan at the 2019 World Aquatics Championships =

- Flag of Japan
- World Aquatics code: JPN
- National federation: Japan Swimming Federation
- Website: swim.or.jp (in Japanese)

in Gwangju, South Korea
- Medals Ranked 11th: Gold 2 Silver 2 Bronze 6 Total 10

World Aquatics Championships appearances
- 1973; 1975; 1978; 1982; 1986; 1991; 1994; 1998; 2001; 2003; 2005; 2007; 2009; 2011; 2013; 2015; 2017; 2019; 2022; 2023; 2024; 2025

Japan competed at the 2019 World Aquatics Championships in Gwangju, South Korea from 12 to 28 July.

== Medalists ==
Medal	Name	Sport	Event	Date
Gold	Daiya Seto	Swimming	Men's 200 metre individual medley	25 July
Gold	Daiya Seto	Swimming	Men's 400 metre individual medley	28 July
Silver	Katsuhiro Matsumoto	Swimming	Men's 200 metre freestyle	23 July
Silver	Daiya Seto	Swimming	Men's 200 metre butterfly	24 July
Bronze	Yukiko Inui	Artistic swimming	Solo technical routine	13 July
Bronze	Atsushi Abe; Yumi Adachi	Artistic swimming	Mixed duet technical routine	15 July
Bronze	Yukiko Inui	Artistic swimming	Solo free routine	17 July
Bronze	Atsushi Abe; Yumi Adachi	Artistic swimming	Mixed duet free routine	20 July
Bronze	Ippei Watanabe	Swimming	Men's 200 metre breaststroke	26 July
Bronze	Yui Ohashi	Swimming	Women's 400 m individual medley	28 July

== Artistic swimming ==
Japan entered 13 artistic swimmers.

Women

Athlete	Event	Preliminaries		Final	
Athlete	Event	Points	Rank	Points	Rank
Yukiko Inui	Solo technical routine	91.7284	3 Q	92.3084	3rd place, bronze medalist(s)
Yukiko Inui	Solo free routine	92.5667	3 Q	93.2000	3rd place, bronze medalist(s)
Yukiko Inui; Megumu Yoshida	Duet technical routine	91.9210	4 Q	92.1116	4
Yukiko Inui; Megumu Yoshida	Duet free routine	92.4333	4 Q	93.0000	4
Juka Fukumura; Yukiko Inui; Moeka Kijima; Kei Marumo; Kano Omata; Mayu Tsukamoto; Mashiro Yasunaga; Megumu Yoshida; Okina Kyogoku (R); Akane Yanagisawa (R)	Team technical routine	92.3274	4 Q	92.7207	4
Juka Fukumura; Yukiko Inui; Moeka Kijima; Okina Kyogoku; Mayu Tsukamoto; Akane Yanagisawa; Mashiro Yasunaga; Megumu Yoshida; Kei Marumo (R); Kano Omata (R)	Team free routine	92.6667	4 Q	93.3667	4
Juka Fukumura; Yukiko Inui; Moeka Kijima; Hinata Kumagai; Okina Kyogoku; Kei Marumo; Mayu Tsukamoto; Akane Yanagisawa; Mashiro Yasunaga; Megumu Yoshida; Kano Omata (R)	Free routine combination	93.0000	4 Q	93.2333	4

Mixed

Athlete	Event	Preliminaries		Final	
Athlete	Event	Points	Rank	Points	Rank
Atsushi Abe; Yumi Adachi	Duet technical routine	88.2948	3 Q	88.5113	3rd place, bronze medalist(s)
Atsushi Abe; Yumi Adachi	Duet free routine	89.8000	3 Q	90.4000	3rd place, bronze medalist(s)

Legend: (R) = Reserve Athlete

== Diving ==
Japan entered seven divers.

Men

Athlete	Event	Preliminaries		Semifinals		Final	
Athlete	Event	Points	Rank	Points	Rank	Points	Rank
Sho Sakai	3 m springboard	375.00	28	did not advance			
Ken Terauchi	3 m springboard	395.80	19	did not advance			
Sho Sakai; Ken Terauchi	Synchronized 3 metre springboard	384.09	2 Q	—N/a		389.43	7

Women

Athlete	Event	Preliminaries		Semifinals		Final	
Athlete	Event	Points	Rank	Points	Rank	Points	Rank
Sayaka Mikami	3 m springboard	291.60	8 Q	307.95	7 Q	323.05	5
Matsuri Arai	10 metre platform	304.75	11 Q	312.45	10 Q	321.45	9
Rin Kaneto	10 metre platform	333.95	5 Q	285.05	17	did not advance	
Haruka Enomoto; Hazuki Miyamoto	Synchronized 3 metre springboard	253.50	14	—N/a		did not advance	

== Open water swimming ==
Japan qualified two male and two female open water swimmers.

Men

Athlete	Event	Time	Rank
Taiki Nonaka	Men's 10 km	1:51:35.3	45
Takeshi Toyoda	Men's 10 km	1:50:22.0	39

Women

Athlete	Event	Time	Rank
Yumi Kida	Women's 10 km	1:55:26.7	22
Minami Niikura	Women's 10 km	1:55:46.8	30

Mixed

Athlete	Event	Time	Rank
Minami Niikura; Yumi Kida; Takeshi Toyoda; Taiki Nonaka	Team	56:52.1	14

== Swimming ==
Japan entered 25 swimmers.

Men

Athlete	Event	Heat		Semifinal		Final	
Athlete	Event	Time	Rank	Time	Rank	Time	Rank
Naito Ehara	200 m freestyle	1:47.46	20	did not advance			
Ryosuke Irie	100 m backstroke	53.38	5 Q	53.13	6 Q	53.22	6
Ryosuke Irie	200 m backstroke	1:57.60	7 Q	1:57.26	8 Q	1:56.52	5
Kazuki Kohinata	200 m breaststroke	2:09.92	14 Q	2:08.42	9	did not advance	
Yasuhiro Koseki	50 m breaststroke	27.33	16 Q	27.22	13	did not advance	
Yasuhiro Koseki	100 m breaststroke	58.91	3 Q	58.89	4 Q	58.93	4
Katsuhiro Matsumoto	200 m freestyle	1:46.51	7 Q	1:45.56	=4 Q	1:45.22 NR	2nd place, silver medalist(s)
Naoki Mizunuma	50 m butterfly	23.74	21	did not advance			
Naoki Mizunuma	100 m butterfly	52.23	12 Q	51.71	9	did not advance	
Katsumi Nakamura	50 m freestyle	22.41	26	did not advance			
Katsumi Nakamura	100 m freestyle	48.68	=11 Q	48.45	=10	did not advance	
Daiya Seto	200 m butterfly	1:54.56	2 Q	1:55.33	3 Q	1:53.86	2nd place, silver medalist(s)
Daiya Seto	200 m individual medley	1:57.90	2 Q	1:57.10	3 Q	1:56.14	1st place, gold medalist(s)
Daiya Seto	400 m individual medley	4:12.27	1 Q	—N/a		4:08.95	1st place, gold medalist(s)
Shinri Shioura	50 m freestyle	21.78	5 Q	21.74	7 Q	21.81	8
Shinri Shioura	100 m freestyle	48.68	=11 Q	48.54	13	did not advance	
Keita Sunama	200 m backstroke	1:58.40	19	did not advance			
Ippei Watanabe	200 m breaststroke	2:09.68	9 Q	2:08.04	6 Q	2:06.73	3rd place, bronze medalist(s)
Katsumi Nakamura; Shinri Shioura; Katsuhiro Matsumoto; Akira Namba	4×100 m freestyle relay	3:14.16	9	—N/a		did not advance	
Kotaro Takahashi; Katsuhiro Matsumoto; Keisuke Yoshida; Daiya Seto	4×200 m freestyle relay	7:09.23	9	—N/a		did not advance	
Ryosuke Irie; Yasuhiro Koseki; Naoki Mizunuma; Katsumi Nakamura	4×100 m medley relay	3:32.34	3 Q	—N/a		3:30.35	4

Women

Athlete	Event	Heat		Semifinal		Final	
Athlete	Event	Time	Rank	Time	Rank	Time	Rank
Reona Aoki	100 m breaststroke	1:06.81	5 Q	1:06.30	3 Q	1:06.40	4
Reona Aoki	200 m breaststroke	2:25.93	11 Q	2:27.95	15	did not advance	
Suzuka Hasegawa	100 m butterfly	58.71	19	did not advance			
Suzuka Hasegawa	200 m butterfly	2:10.03	12 Q	2:09.22	10	did not advance	
Chihiro Igarashi	200 m freestyle	1:59.18	16 Q	1:58.97	16	did not advance	
Chihiro Igarashi	400 m freestyle	4:13.81	20	—N/a		did not advance	
Hiroko Makino	100 m butterfly	58.33	16 Q	58.49	16	did not advance	
Hiroko Makino	200 m butterfly	2:09.88	10 Q	2:09.60	11	did not advance	
Yui Ohashi	200 m individual medley	2:11.09	9 Q	2:10.04	6 Q	DSQ	
Yui Ohashi	400 m individual medley	4:37.23	2 Q	—N/a		4:32.33	3rd place, bronze medalist(s)
Rika Omoto	50 m freestyle	25.17	20	did not advance			
Rika Omoto	100 m freestyle	54.89	26	did not advance			
Rika Omoto	200 m individual medley	2:10.50	5 Q	2:09.68	5 Q	2:09.32	5
Natsumi Sakai	50 m backstroke	28.41	20	did not advance			
Natsumi Sakai	100 m backstroke	1:00.05	10 Q	59.71	8 Q	59.56	=6
Natsumi Sakai	200 m backstroke	2:10.40	12 Q	2:10.11	11	did not advance	
Rio Shirai	200 m freestyle	1:58.10	12 Q	1:56.82	8 Q	1:57.14	8
Rio Shirai	200 m backstroke	2:14.98	31	did not advance			
Tomomi Aoki; Aya Sato; Rio Shirai; Rika Omoto	4×100 m freestyle relay	3:36.17	5 Q	—N/a		3:36.79	7
Rio Shirai; Chihiro Igarashi; Tomomi Aoki; Nagisa Ikemoto	4×200 m freestyle relay	7:56.00	8 Q	—N/a		7:56.31	8
Natsumi Sakai; Reona Aoki; Hiroko Makino; Rika Omoto	4×100 m medley relay	3:59.87	8 Q	—N/a		3:58.14	6

Mixed

Athlete	Event	Heat		Final	
Athlete	Event	Time	Rank	Time	Rank
Katsumi Nakamura; Katsuhiro Matsumoto; Rika Omoto; Aya Sato; Tomomi Aoki*	4×100 m freestyle relay	3:25.41	7 Q	3:24.67 AS	7
Natsumi Sakai; Yasuhiro Koseki; Naoki Mizunuma; Rika Omoto	4×100 m medley relay	DSQ		did not advance	

Legend: (*) = Swimmers who participated in the heat only.

== Water polo ==
=== Men's tournament ===
Team roster

- Katsuyuki Tanamura
- Seiya Adachi
- Harukiirario Koppu
- Mitsuaki Shiga
- Takuma Yoshida
- Atsuto Iida
- Yusuke Shimizu
- Mitsuru Takata
- Atsushi Arai
- Yusuke Inaba
- Keigo Okawa (C)
- Kenta Araki
- Tomoyoshi Fukushima
- Coach: Yoji Omoto

Group D

Pos	Team	Pld	W	D	L	GF	GA	GD	Pts	Qualification
1	Italy	3	3	0	0	31	19	+12	6	Quarterfinals
2	Germany	3	1	1	1	31	25	+6	3	Playoffs
3	Japan	3	1	1	1	27	27	0	3	Playoffs
4	Brazil	3	0	0	3	22	40	−18	0	

Source: Sportresult
Rules for classification: 1) points; 2) head-to-head points; 3) head-to-head goal difference; 4) head-to-head number of goals scored; 5) Goal difference.

15 July 2019; 20:30	Report	Germany	9–9	Japan	Nambu University Aquatics Center, Gwangju; Referees: Michael Goldenberg (USA), Daniel Flahive (AUS)
15 July 2019; 20:30	Report	Score by quarters: 3–2, 4–3, 1–3, 1–1			Nambu University Aquatics Center, Gwangju; Referees: Michael Goldenberg (USA), Daniel Flahive (AUS)
15 July 2019; 20:30	Report	Stamm 3	Goals	Arai 3	Nambu University Aquatics Center, Gwangju; Referees: Michael Goldenberg (USA), Daniel Flahive (AUS)

17 July 2019; 16:30	Report	Japan	7–9	Italy	Nambu University Aquatics Center, Gwangju; Referees: Sebastien Dervieux (FRA), Jaume Teixidó (ESP)
17 July 2019; 16:30	Report	Score by quarters: 0–2, 2–1, 4–4, 1–2			Nambu University Aquatics Center, Gwangju; Referees: Sebastien Dervieux (FRA), Jaume Teixidó (ESP)
17 July 2019; 16:30	Report	Arai, Inaba 2	Goals	Figlioli 4	Nambu University Aquatics Center, Gwangju; Referees: Sebastien Dervieux (FRA), Jaume Teixidó (ESP)

19 July 2019; 11:10	Report	Brazil	9–11	Japan	Nambu University Aquatics Center, Gwangju; Referees: Nenad Periš (CRO), Viktor Salnichenko (KAZ)
19 July 2019; 11:10	Report	Score by quarters: 2–2, 1–5, 3–3, 3–1			Nambu University Aquatics Center, Gwangju; Referees: Nenad Periš (CRO), Viktor Salnichenko (KAZ)
19 July 2019; 11:10	Report	Guimarães 3	Goals	Shiga, Yoshida 3	Nambu University Aquatics Center, Gwangju; Referees: Nenad Periš (CRO), Viktor Salnichenko (KAZ)

Playoffs

21 July 2019; 17:00	Report	Spain	15–7	Japan	Nambu University Aquatics Center, Gwangju; Referees: Arkadiy Voevodin (RUS), Dion Willis (RSA)
21 July 2019; 17:00	Report	Score by quarters: 2–1, 3–3, 4–2, 6–1			Nambu University Aquatics Center, Gwangju; Referees: Arkadiy Voevodin (RUS), Dion Willis (RSA)
21 July 2019; 17:00	Report	Munarriz 6	Goals	Adachi 2	Nambu University Aquatics Center, Gwangju; Referees: Arkadiy Voevodin (RUS), Dion Willis (RSA)

9th–12th place semifinals

23 July 2019; 11:00	Report	Montenegro	14–7	Japan	Nambu University Aquatics Center, Gwangju; Referees: Germán Moller (ARG), Alessandro Severo (ITA)
23 July 2019; 11:00	Report	Score by quarters: 3–2, 4–1, 4–3, 3–1			Nambu University Aquatics Center, Gwangju; Referees: Germán Moller (ARG), Alessandro Severo (ITA)
23 July 2019; 11:00	Report	Ivović, Murišić 3	Goals	Arai, Inaba 2	Nambu University Aquatics Center, Gwangju; Referees: Germán Moller (ARG), Alessandro Severo (ITA)

Eleventh place game

25 July 2019; 09:30	Report	Japan	15–5	South Africa	Nambu University Aquatics Center, Gwangju; Referees: Viktor Salnichenko (KAZ), Juan Menéndez (CUB)
25 July 2019; 09:30	Report	Score by quarters: 5–1, 4–1, 3–2, 3–1			Nambu University Aquatics Center, Gwangju; Referees: Viktor Salnichenko (KAZ), Juan Menéndez (CUB)
25 July 2019; 09:30	Report	Shimizu, Inaba 3	Goals	Evezard 2	Nambu University Aquatics Center, Gwangju; Referees: Viktor Salnichenko (KAZ), Juan Menéndez (CUB)

=== Women's tournament ===
Team roster

- Rikako Miura
- Yumi Arima
- Akari Inaba
- Shino Magariyama
- Chiaki Sakanoue
- Miku Koide
- Maiko Hashida
- Yuki Niizawa
- Minori Yamamoto
- Misaki Noro
- Marina Tokumoto
- Kotori Suzuki (C)
- Minami Shioya
- Coach: Makihiro Motomiya

Group D

Pos	Team	Pld	W	D	L	GF	GA	GD	Pts	Qualification
1	Italy	3	3	0	0	33	22	+11	6	Quarterfinals
2	Australia	3	2	0	1	32	29	+3	4	Playoffs
3	China	3	1	0	2	26	34	−8	2	Playoffs
4	Japan	3	0	0	3	20	26	−6	0	

Source: Sportresult
Rules for classification: 1) points; 2) head-to-head points; 3) head-to-head goal difference; 4) head-to-head number of goals scored; 5) Goal difference.

14 July 2019; 19:10	Report	Japan	6–8	China	Nambu University Aquatics Center, Gwangju; Referees: Gabriella Várkonyi (HUN), Michael Goldenberg (USA)
14 July 2019; 19:10	Report	Score by quarters: 2–1, 1–1, 2–4, 1–2			Nambu University Aquatics Center, Gwangju; Referees: Gabriella Várkonyi (HUN), Michael Goldenberg (USA)
14 July 2019; 19:10	Report	Arima 3	Goals	Chen, Wang X. 2	Nambu University Aquatics Center, Gwangju; Referees: Gabriella Várkonyi (HUN), Michael Goldenberg (USA)

16 July 2019; 17:50	Report	Japan	7–9	Italy	Nambu University Aquatics Center, Gwangju; Referees: Gabriella Várkonyi (HUN), Arkadiy Voevodin (RUS)
16 July 2019; 17:50	Report	Score by quarters: 2–3, 2–3, 1–1, 2–2			Nambu University Aquatics Center, Gwangju; Referees: Gabriella Várkonyi (HUN), Arkadiy Voevodin (RUS)
16 July 2019; 17:50	Report	Arima 3	Goals	Bianconi 5	Nambu University Aquatics Center, Gwangju; Referees: Gabriella Várkonyi (HUN), Arkadiy Voevodin (RUS)

18 July 2019; 11:10	Report	Japan	7–9	Australia	Nambu University Aquatics Center, Gwangju; Referees: Gabriella Várkonyi (HUN), Stanko Ivanovski (MNE)
18 July 2019; 11:10	Report	Score by quarters: 2–3, 2–1, 1–2, 2–3			Nambu University Aquatics Center, Gwangju; Referees: Gabriella Várkonyi (HUN), Stanko Ivanovski (MNE)
18 July 2019; 11:10	Report	three players 2	Goals	Buckling 3	Nambu University Aquatics Center, Gwangju; Referees: Gabriella Várkonyi (HUN), Stanko Ivanovski (MNE)

13th–16th place semifinals

20 July 2019; 12:00	Report	Cuba	9–21	Japan	Nambu University Aquatics Center, Gwangju; Referees: Gabriella Várkonyi (HUN), John Waldow (NZL)
20 July 2019; 12:00	Report	Score by quarters: 3–6, 2–6, 2–4, 2–5			Nambu University Aquatics Center, Gwangju; Referees: Gabriella Várkonyi (HUN), John Waldow (NZL)
20 July 2019; 12:00	Report	Bernal 3	Goals	Arima 5	Nambu University Aquatics Center, Gwangju; Referees: Gabriella Várkonyi (HUN), John Waldow (NZL)

13th place game

22 July 2019; 09:30	Report	South Africa	2–21	Japan	Nambu University Aquatics Center, Gwangju; Referees: John Waldow (NZL), Ni Shi Wei (CHN)
22 July 2019; 09:30	Report	Score by quarters: 0–4, 1–4, 1–6, 0–7			Nambu University Aquatics Center, Gwangju; Referees: John Waldow (NZL), Ni Shi Wei (CHN)
22 July 2019; 09:30	Report	Moir, Hallendorff 1	Goals	Arima 5	Nambu University Aquatics Center, Gwangju; Referees: John Waldow (NZL), Ni Shi Wei (CHN)
