= 2019 FINA Men's Water Polo World League =

18th edition FINA Men's Water Polo World League

- League: FINA Water Polo World League
- Sport: Water Polo
- Duration: 23 October 2018 to 23 June 2019

Super Final
- Finals champions: Serbia (12th title)
- Runners-up: Croatia

FINA Men's Water Polo World League seasons
- ← 2018 2021 →

The 2019 FINA Men's Water Polo World League was the 18th edition of the annual men's international water polo tournament. It was played between October 2018 and June 2019 and opened to all men's water polo national teams. After participating in a preliminary round, eight teams qualified to play in a final tournament, called the Super Final from 18 to 23 June 2019.

In the world league, there are specific rules that do not allow matches to end in a draw. If teams are level at the end of the 4th quarter of any world league match, the match will be decided by a penalty shootout. Teams earn points in the standings in group matches as follows:

- Match won in normal time – 3 points
- Match won in shootout – 2 points
- Match lost in shootout – 1 point
- Match lost in normal time – 0 points

== Preliminary rounds ==
=== European Qualification ===
- October 23, 2018 – March 12, 2019

==== Group A ====
Pos	Team	Pld	W	OTW	OTL	L	GF	GA	GD	Pts	Qualification	Hungary	Russia	Germany	Malta
1	Hungary	6	5	1	0	0	102	53	+49	17	Europa Cup Final	—	10–8	17–9	24–8
2	Russia	6	4	0	0	2	89	52	+37	12	Europa Cup Final	8–15	—	14–8	23–4
3	Germany	6	2	0	1	3	80	79	+1	7		12–12 (4–5)	10–18	—	23–9
4	Malta	6	0	0	0	6	43	130	−87	0		8–24	5–18	9–18	—

Source: FINA
Rules for classification: Only goals scored in regular time are counted.

==== Group B ====
Pos	Team	Pld	W	OTW	OTL	L	GF	GA	GD	Pts	Qualification	Spain	Greece	Netherlands	Ukraine
1	Spain	6	5	0	0	1	67	30	+37	15	Europa Cup Final	—	5–7	14–7	17–2
2	Greece	6	5	0	0	1	86	34	+52	15	Europa Cup Final	4–7	—	14–9	25–2
3	Netherlands	6	2	0	0	4	59	63	−4	6		7–13	6–12	—	15–5
4	Ukraine	6	0	0	0	6	22	107	−85	0		3–11	5–24	5–15	—

Source: FINA
Rules for classification: Only goals scored in regular time are counted.

==== Group C ====
Pos	Team	Pld	W	OTW	OTL	L	GF	GA	GD	Pts	Qualification	Italy	Montenegro	France
1	Italy	4	3	0	1	0	37	25	+12	10	Europa Cup Final	—	11–10	12–3
2	Montenegro	4	2	1	0	1	41	36	+5	8	Europa Cup Final	8–8 (3–0)	—	10–8
3	France	4	0	0	0	4	24	41	−17	0		4–6	9–13	—

Source: FINA
Rules for classification: Only goals scored in regular time are counted.

==== Group D ====
Pos	Team	Pld	W	OTW	OTL	L	GF	GA	GD	Pts	Qualification	Croatia	Serbia	Romania
1	Croatia	4	3	0	1	0	47	27	+20	10	Europa Cup Final	—	12–9	17–4
2	Serbia	4	2	1	0	1	42	31	+11	8	Europa Cup Final	7–7 (4–2)	—	13–6
3	Romania	4	0	0	0	4	23	54	−31	0		7–11	6–13	—

Source: FINA
Rules for classification: Only goals scored in regular time are counted.

=== Europa Cup Final ===
- April 5–7, 2019, Zagreb, Croatia

==== Bracket ====
Quarterfinals
5 April
Hungary	11
Montenegro	7
5 April
Italy	11
Russia	9
5 April
Spain	13
Serbia	12
5 April
Croatia	13
Greece	11

Semifinals
6 April
Hungary	12
Italy	11
6 April
Spain	9
Croatia	12

Final
7 April
Hungary	10
Croatia	8
Third place game
7 April
Italy	7
Spain	9

5th–8th place bracket

5th–8th place semifinals
6 April
Montenegro	15
Russia	9
6 April
Serbia	14
Greece	10

Fifth place game
7 April
Montenegro	16
Serbia	14
Seventh place game
7 April
Russia	14
Greece	15

==== Final ranking ====
Qualified to Super Final
Qualified to Super Final as host country

Rank	Team
Gold medal	Hungary
Silver medal	Croatia
Bronze medal	Spain
4	Italy
5	Montenegro
6	Serbia
7	Greece
8	Russia

=== Intercontinental Cup ===
- March 26–31, 2019, Perth, Australia

==== Group A ====
Pos	Team	Pld	W	OTW	OTL	L	GF	GA	GD	Pts	Qualification	Australia	Japan	Canada	South Africa
1	Australia	3	2	1	0	0	40	26	+14	8	Quarterfinals	—	—	—	—
2	Japan	3	2	0	1	0	44	36	+8	7	Quarterfinals	12–12 (3–5)	—	13–10	19–14
3	Canada	3	1	0	0	2	36	26	+10	3	Quarterfinals	8–9	—	—	18–4
4	South Africa	3	0	0	0	3	24	56	−32	0	Quarterfinals	6–19	—	—	—

Source: FINA
Rules for classification: Only goals scored in regular time are counted.

==== Group B ====
Pos	Team	Pld	W	OTW	OTL	L	GF	GA	GD	Pts	Qualification	Kazakhstan	People's Republic of China	Argentina	New Zealand
1	Kazakhstan	3	2	0	1	0	32	25	+7	7	Quarterfinals	—	—	11–5	12–11
2	China	3	1	1	1	0	32	25	+7	6	Quarterfinals	9–9 (7–6)	—	9–9 (4–5)	14–7
3	Argentina	3	1	1	0	1	28	29	−1	5	Quarterfinals	—	—	—	14–9
4	New Zealand	3	0	0	0	3	27	40	−13	0	Quarterfinals	—	—	—	—

Source: FINA
Rules for classification: Only goals scored in regular time are counted.

==== Bracket ====
Quarterfinals
29 March
Japan	13
Argentina	8
29 March
South Africa	8
Kazakhstan	14
29 March
Canada	11
China	10
29 March
Australia	15
New Zealand	4

Semifinals
30 March
Japan	12
Kazakhstan	7
30 March
Canada	7
Australia	14

Final
31 March
Japan	8
Australia	10
Third place game
31 March
Kazakhstan	4
Canada	9

5th–8th place bracket

5th–8th place semifinals
30 March
Argentina	12
South Africa	6
30 March
China	11
New Zealand	8

Fifth place game
31 March
Argentina	7
China	5
Seventh place game
31 March
South Africa	8
New Zealand	10

==== Final ranking ====
Qualified to Super Final

Rank	Team
Gold medal	Australia
Silver medal	Japan
Bronze medal	Canada
4	Kazakhstan
5	Argentina
6	China
7	New Zealand
8	South Africa

== Super Final ==
- June 18–23, 2019, Belgrade, Serbia

=== Venue ===
Belgrade	2019 FINA Men's Water Polo World League (Serbia)
Tašmajdan Sports and Recreation Center	2019 FINA Men's Water Polo World League (Serbia)
Capacity: 2,500	2019 FINA Men's Water Polo World League (Serbia)

=== Qualified teams ===
Africa	Americas	Asia	Europe	Oceania
—	Canada	Japan; Kazakhstan	Croatia; Hungary; Serbia (Host); Spain	Australia

=== Group A ===
Pos	Team	Pld	W	OTW	OTL	L	GF	GA	GD	Pts	Qualification	Spain	Hungary	Japan	Canada
1	Spain	3	2	0	1	0	41	26	+15	7	Quarterfinals	—	—	—	—
2	Hungary	3	1	1	0	1	33	30	+3	5	Quarterfinals	11–11 (4–1)	—	13–9	9–10
3	Japan	3	1	0	0	2	36	38	−2	3 (Note: Japan 17–7 Canada)	Quarterfinals	10–18	—	—	17–7
4	Canada	3	1	0	0	2	22	38	−16	3	Quarterfinals	5–12	—	—	—

Source: FINA
Rules for classification: Only goals scored in regular time are counted.
Notes:

All times are UTC+2.

18 June 2019; 15:45	Report	Hungary	9–10	Canada	Belgrade, Serbia; Referees: Viktor Salnichenko (KAZ), Vojin Putniković (SRB)
18 June 2019; 15:45	Report	Score by quarters: 1–3, 3–2, 3–4, 2–1			Belgrade, Serbia; Referees: Viktor Salnichenko (KAZ), Vojin Putniković (SRB)
18 June 2019; 15:45	Report	Kállay 3	Goals	D'Souza 3	Belgrade, Serbia; Referees: Viktor Salnichenko (KAZ), Vojin Putniković (SRB)

18 June 2019; 19:15	Report	Japan	10–18	Spain	Belgrade, Serbia; Referees: Arkadiy Voevodin (RUS), Adrian Alexandrescu (ROU)
18 June 2019; 19:15	Report	Score by quarters: 3–3, 3–6, 1–5, 3–4			Belgrade, Serbia; Referees: Arkadiy Voevodin (RUS), Adrian Alexandrescu (ROU)
18 June 2019; 19:15	Report	Inaba 4	Goals	three players 4	Belgrade, Serbia; Referees: Arkadiy Voevodin (RUS), Adrian Alexandrescu (ROU)

19 June 2019; 15:00	Report	Japan	17–7	Canada	Belgrade, Serbia; Referees: Daniel Flahive (AUS), Viktor Salnichenko (KAZ)
19 June 2019; 15:00	Report	Score by quarters: 6–2, 2–2, 8–2, 1–1			Belgrade, Serbia; Referees: Daniel Flahive (AUS), Viktor Salnichenko (KAZ)
19 June 2019; 15:00	Report	Arai, Inaba 4	Goals	Halajian 2	Belgrade, Serbia; Referees: Daniel Flahive (AUS), Viktor Salnichenko (KAZ)

19 June 2019; 16:45	Report	Hungary	15–12 (PSO)	Spain	Belgrade, Serbia; Referees: Boris Margeta (SLO), Nenad Periš (CRO)
19 June 2019; 16:45	Report	Score by quarters: 2–3, 3–3, 3–3, 3–2 PSO: 4–1			Belgrade, Serbia; Referees: Boris Margeta (SLO), Nenad Periš (CRO)
19 June 2019; 16:45	Report	Pásztor 4	Goals	Granados 4	Belgrade, Serbia; Referees: Boris Margeta (SLO), Nenad Periš (CRO)

20 June 2019; 16:45	Report	Hungary	13–9	Japan	Belgrade, Serbia; Referees: Nenad Periš (CRO), Vojin Putniković (SRB)
20 June 2019; 16:45	Report	Score by quarters: 3–3, 3–3, 3–2, 4–1			Belgrade, Serbia; Referees: Nenad Periš (CRO), Vojin Putniković (SRB)
20 June 2019; 16:45	Report	Toni 5	Goals	Inaba 4	Belgrade, Serbia; Referees: Nenad Periš (CRO), Vojin Putniković (SRB)

20 June 2019; 19:45	Report	Canada	5–12	Spain	Belgrade, Serbia; Referees: Georgios Stavridis (GRE), Daniel Flahive (AUS)
20 June 2019; 19:45	Report	Score by quarters: 2–2, 1–1, 2–4, 0–5			Belgrade, Serbia; Referees: Georgios Stavridis (GRE), Daniel Flahive (AUS)
20 June 2019; 19:45	Report	D'Souza 4	Goals	Granados 3	Belgrade, Serbia; Referees: Georgios Stavridis (GRE), Daniel Flahive (AUS)

=== Group B ===
Pos	Team	Pld	W	OTW	OTL	L	GF	GA	GD	Pts	Qualification	Serbia	Croatia	Australia	Kazakhstan
1	Serbia (H)	3	3	0	0	0	43	24	+19	9	Quarterfinals	—	—	—	—
2	Croatia	3	2	0	0	1	41	24	+17	6	Quarterfinals	10–11	—	11–9	20–4
3	Australia	3	1	0	0	2	31	28	+3	3	Quarterfinals	8–12	—	—	14–5
4	Kazakhstan	3	0	0	0	3	15	54	−39	0	Quarterfinals	6–20	—	—	—

Source: FINA
Rules for classification: Only goals scored in regular time are counted.
(H) Host

All times are UTC+2.

18 June 2019; 14:00	Report	Croatia	20–4	Kazakhstan	Belgrade, Serbia; Referees: Kunihiro Sato (JPN), Mikhail Dykman (CAN)
18 June 2019; 14:00	Report	Score by quarters: 5–2, 6–0, 3–0, 6–2			Belgrade, Serbia; Referees: Kunihiro Sato (JPN), Mikhail Dykman (CAN)
18 June 2019; 14:00	Report	Vukičević 4	Goals	Aubakirov 2	Belgrade, Serbia; Referees: Kunihiro Sato (JPN), Mikhail Dykman (CAN)

18 June 2019; 21:00	Report	Australia	8–12	Serbia	Belgrade, Serbia; Referees: Georgios Stavridis (GRE), Jaume Teixido (ESP)
18 June 2019; 21:00	Report	Score by quarters: 5–4, 0–3, 3–4, 0–1			Belgrade, Serbia; Referees: Georgios Stavridis (GRE), Jaume Teixido (ESP)
18 June 2019; 21:00	Report	three players 2	Goals	Prlainović 3	Belgrade, Serbia; Referees: Georgios Stavridis (GRE), Jaume Teixido (ESP)

19 June 2019; 19:15	Report	Australia	14–5	Kazakhstan	Belgrade, Serbia; Referees: Georgios Stavridis (GRE), György Kun (HUN)
19 June 2019; 19:15	Report	Score by quarters: 3–2, 4–1, 3–0, 4–2			Belgrade, Serbia; Referees: Georgios Stavridis (GRE), György Kun (HUN)
19 June 2019; 19:15	Report	five players 2	Goals	Aubakirov 2	Belgrade, Serbia; Referees: Georgios Stavridis (GRE), György Kun (HUN)

19 June 2019; 21:00	Report	Croatia	10–11	Serbia	Belgrade, Serbia; Referees: Adrian Alexandrescu (ROU), Arkadiy Voevodin (RUS)
19 June 2019; 21:00	Report	Score by quarters: 3–2, 2–2, 1–4, 4–3			Belgrade, Serbia; Referees: Adrian Alexandrescu (ROU), Arkadiy Voevodin (RUS)
19 June 2019; 21:00	Report	Joković 4	Goals	Stojanović 3	Belgrade, Serbia; Referees: Adrian Alexandrescu (ROU), Arkadiy Voevodin (RUS)

20 June 2019; 15:00	Report	Croatia	11–9	Australia	Belgrade, Serbia; Referees: Arkadiy Voevodin (RUS), György Kun (HUN)
20 June 2019; 15:00	Report	Score by quarters: 2–3, 2–2, 6–3, 1–1			Belgrade, Serbia; Referees: Arkadiy Voevodin (RUS), György Kun (HUN)
20 June 2019; 15:00	Report	Vrlić 3	Goals	Ford 3	Belgrade, Serbia; Referees: Arkadiy Voevodin (RUS), György Kun (HUN)

20 June 2019; 21:00	Report	Kazakhstan	6–20	Serbia	Belgrade, Serbia; Referees: Mikhail Dykman (CAN), Jaume Teixidó (ESP)
20 June 2019; 21:00	Report	Score by quarters: 0–4, 3–6, 1–6, 2–4			Belgrade, Serbia; Referees: Mikhail Dykman (CAN), Jaume Teixidó (ESP)
20 June 2019; 21:00	Report	Shakenov 3	Goals	Rašović 5	Belgrade, Serbia; Referees: Mikhail Dykman (CAN), Jaume Teixidó (ESP)

=== Bracket ===
Quarterfinals
21 June 2019
Hungary	10 (5)
Australia (pen.)	10 (6)
21 June 2019
Canada	5
Serbia	20
21 June 2019
Japan	14
Croatia	20
21 June 2019
Spain	19
Kazakhstan	10

Semifinals
22 June 2019
Australia	11
Serbia	16
22 June 2019
Croatia	10
Spain	8

Final
23 June 2019
Serbia	12
Croatia	11
Third place game
23 June 2019
Australia	11
Spain	10

5th–8th place bracket

5th–8th place semifinals
22 June 2019
Hungary	15
Canada	8
22 June 2019
Japan	13
Kazakhstan	12

Fifth place game
23 June 2019
Hungary	15
Japan	13
Seventh place game
23 June 2019
Canada	13 (3)
Kazakhstan (pen.)	13 (4)

All times are UTC+2.

==== Quarterfinals ====
21 June 2019; 15:00	Report	Hungary	15–16 (PSO)	Australia	Belgrade, Serbia; Referees: Boris Margeta (SLO), Nenad Periš (CRO)
21 June 2019; 15:00	Report	Score by quarters: 2–1, 3–0, 2–4, 3–5 PSO: 5–6			Belgrade, Serbia; Referees: Boris Margeta (SLO), Nenad Periš (CRO)
21 June 2019; 15:00	Report	Bátori 3	Goals	Campbell 3	Belgrade, Serbia; Referees: Boris Margeta (SLO), Nenad Periš (CRO)

21 June 2019; 16:45	Report	Japan	14–20	Croatia	Belgrade, Serbia; Referees: Georgios Stavridis (GRE), Vojin Putniković (SRB)
21 June 2019; 16:45	Report	Score by quarters: 3–4, 3–6, 2–5, 6–5			Belgrade, Serbia; Referees: Georgios Stavridis (GRE), Vojin Putniković (SRB)
21 June 2019; 16:45	Report	Inaba 6	Goals	Fatović 5	Belgrade, Serbia; Referees: Georgios Stavridis (GRE), Vojin Putniković (SRB)

21 June 2019; 19:15	Report	Spain	19–10	Kazakhstan	Belgrade, Serbia; Referees: Arkadiy Voevodin (RUS), Daniel Flahive (AUS)
21 June 2019; 19:15	Report	Score by quarters: 4–1, 4–2, 6–4, 5–3			Belgrade, Serbia; Referees: Arkadiy Voevodin (RUS), Daniel Flahive (AUS)
21 June 2019; 19:15	Report	Granados 5	Goals	Ruday 3	Belgrade, Serbia; Referees: Arkadiy Voevodin (RUS), Daniel Flahive (AUS)

21 June 2019; 21:00	Report	Canada	5–20	Serbia	Belgrade, Serbia; Referees: Adrian Alexandrescu (ROU), Kunihiro Sato (JPN)
21 June 2019; 21:00	Report	Score by quarters: 2–5, 2–6, 0–4, 1–5			Belgrade, Serbia; Referees: Adrian Alexandrescu (ROU), Kunihiro Sato (JPN)
21 June 2019; 21:00	Report	D 'Souza 4	Goals	Mandić, Filipović 3	Belgrade, Serbia; Referees: Adrian Alexandrescu (ROU), Kunihiro Sato (JPN)

==== 5th–8th place semifinals ====
22 June 2019; 10:00	Report	Hungary	15–8	Canada	Belgrade, Serbia; Referees: Daniel Flahive (AUS), Jaume Teixidó (ESP)
22 June 2019; 10:00	Report	Score by quarters: 4–3, 4–3, 3–1, 4–1			Belgrade, Serbia; Referees: Daniel Flahive (AUS), Jaume Teixidó (ESP)
22 June 2019; 10:00	Report	three players 3	Goals	D 'Souza 3	Belgrade, Serbia; Referees: Daniel Flahive (AUS), Jaume Teixidó (ESP)

22 June 2019; 11:45	Report	Japan	13–12	Kazakhstan	Belgrade, Serbia; Referees: Nenad Periš (CRO), Vojin Putniković (SRB)
22 June 2019; 11:45	Report	Score by quarters: 4–2, 4–2, 2–3, 3–5			Belgrade, Serbia; Referees: Nenad Periš (CRO), Vojin Putniković (SRB)
22 June 2019; 11:45	Report	Inaba 5	Goals	Shakenov 4	Belgrade, Serbia; Referees: Nenad Periš (CRO), Vojin Putniković (SRB)

==== Semifinals ====
22 June 2019; 15:00	Report	Australia	11–16	Serbia	Belgrade, Serbia; Referees: Adrian Alexandrescu (ROU), Arkadiy Voevodin (RUS)
22 June 2019; 15:00	Report	Score by quarters: 2–6, 2–3, 3–2, 4–5			Belgrade, Serbia; Referees: Adrian Alexandrescu (ROU), Arkadiy Voevodin (RUS)
22 June 2019; 15:00	Report	Kayes 3	Goals	Filipović 5	Belgrade, Serbia; Referees: Adrian Alexandrescu (ROU), Arkadiy Voevodin (RUS)

22 June 2019; 16:45	Report	Croatia	10–8	Spain	Belgrade, Serbia; Referees: Boris Margeta (SLO), Georgios Stavridis (GRE)
22 June 2019; 16:45	Report	Score by quarters: 5–1, 3–2, 2–4, 0–1			Belgrade, Serbia; Referees: Boris Margeta (SLO), Georgios Stavridis (GRE)
22 June 2019; 16:45	Report	Vrlić, García 2	Goals	Munarriz 3	Belgrade, Serbia; Referees: Boris Margeta (SLO), Georgios Stavridis (GRE)

==== 7th place game ====
23 June 2019; 10:00	Report	Canada	16–17 (PSO)	Kazakhstan	Belgrade, Serbia; Referees: György Kun (HUN), Jaume Teixidó (ESP)
23 June 2019; 10:00	Report	Score by quarters: 4–2, 3–3, 4–5, 2–3 PSO: 3–4			Belgrade, Serbia; Referees: György Kun (HUN), Jaume Teixidó (ESP)
23 June 2019; 10:00	Report	Constantin-Bicari 5	Goals	Zhardan 4	Belgrade, Serbia; Referees: György Kun (HUN), Jaume Teixidó (ESP)

==== 5th place game ====
23 June 2019; 11:45	Report	Hungary	15–13	Japan	Belgrade, Serbia; Referees: Mikhail Dykman (CAN), Viktor Salnichenko (KAZ)
23 June 2019; 11:45	Report	Score by quarters: 4–3, 4–2, 2–2, 5–6			Belgrade, Serbia; Referees: Mikhail Dykman (CAN), Viktor Salnichenko (KAZ)
23 June 2019; 11:45	Report	three players 3	Goals	Okawa 4	Belgrade, Serbia; Referees: Mikhail Dykman (CAN), Viktor Salnichenko (KAZ)

==== 3rd place game ====
23 June 2019; 15:00	Report	(bronze) Australia	11–10	Spain	Belgrade, Serbia; Referees: Boris Margeta (SLO), Vojin Putniković (SRB)
23 June 2019; 15:00	Report	Score by quarters: 3–1, 2–3, 4–4, 2–2			Belgrade, Serbia; Referees: Boris Margeta (SLO), Vojin Putniković (SRB)
23 June 2019; 15:00	Report	Kayes 4	Goals	Mallarach 3	Belgrade, Serbia; Referees: Boris Margeta (SLO), Vojin Putniković (SRB)

==== Final ====
23 June 2019; 16:45	Report	(gold) Serbia	12–11	Croatia (silver)	Belgrade, Serbia; Referees: Georgios Stavridis (GRE), Adrian Alexandrescu (ROU)
23 June 2019; 16:45	Report	Score by quarters: 1–3, 5–2, 1–3, 5–3			Belgrade, Serbia; Referees: Georgios Stavridis (GRE), Adrian Alexandrescu (ROU)
23 June 2019; 16:45	Report	Mandić, Filipović 4	Goals	Vukičević 5	Belgrade, Serbia; Referees: Georgios Stavridis (GRE), Adrian Alexandrescu (ROU)

== Final ranking ==
Qualified for the 2020 Olympic Games

Rank	Team
Gold medal	Serbia
Silver medal	Croatia
Bronze medal	Australia
4	Spain
5	Hungary
6	Japan
7	Kazakhstan
8	Canada

2019 FINA Men's Water Polo World League

Serbia
12th title

Team Roster

Gojko Pijetlović, Dušan Mandić, Ognjen Stojanović, Sava Ranđelović, Miloš Ćuk, Duško Pijetlović, Nemanja Vico, Milan Aleksić, Nikola Jakšić, Filip Filipović, Andrija Prlainović, Stefan Mitrović, Branislav Mitrović, Radomir Drašović, Strahinja Rašović. Head coach: Dejan Savić.

=== Awards ===
Finals MVP	Top Scorer	Best Goalkeeper	MVP
(Serbia) Filip Filipović	(Japan) Yusuke Inaba (26 goals)	(Croatia) Marko Bijač	(Serbia) Filip Filipović
