= Water polo at the 2017 Summer Universiade – Men's tournament =

Men's water polo at the XXIX Summer Universiade
- Venue: Hsinchu County Natatorium; National Taiwan Sport University Arena
- Dates: 18–30 August 2017
- Teams: 16

Medalists
1st place, gold medalist(s)		Serbia
2nd place, silver medalist(s)		Russia
3rd place, bronze medalist(s)		Italy

Men's water polo at the 2017 Summer Universiade was held in Taipei, Taiwan, from 18 to 30 August 2017.

== Results ==
All times are Taiwan Standard Time (UTC+08:00)

=== Preliminary round ===
==== Group A ====
Team	Pld	W	D	L	GF	GA	GD	Pts
France	3	3	0	0	60	13	+47	6
Great Britain	3	2	0	1	34	26	+8	4
South Korea	3	1	0	2	32	31	+1	2
Chinese Taipei	3	0	0	3	6	62	−56	0

18 August 2017; 09:00	Report	Chinese Taipei	4–17	South Korea	Hsinchu County Natatorium; Referees: Keiichi Orikasa (JPN); David Couper (NZL)
18 August 2017; 09:00	Report	Score by quarters: 0–5, 1–5, 0–3, 3–4			Hsinchu County Natatorium; Referees: Keiichi Orikasa (JPN); David Couper (NZL)
18 August 2017; 09:00	Report	Ko J-y 2	Goals	Lee S-g, Youn Y-g 4	Hsinchu County Natatorium; Referees: Keiichi Orikasa (JPN); David Couper (NZL)

18 August 2017; 10:20	Report	France	17–5	Great Britain	Hsinchu County Natatorium; Referees: Andrew Carney (AUS); Vladimir Gerzanich (RUS)
18 August 2017; 10:20	Report	Score by quarters: 5–2, 3–1, 3–1, 6–1			Hsinchu County Natatorium; Referees: Andrew Carney (AUS); Vladimir Gerzanich (RUS)
18 August 2017; 10:20	Report	Izdinsky 4	Goals	Daly 2	Hsinchu County Natatorium; Referees: Andrew Carney (AUS); Vladimir Gerzanich (RUS)

20 August 2017; 09:00	Report	Great Britain	11–7	South Korea	Hsinchu County Natatorium; Referees: Jean-Francois Morisseau (CAN); Keiichi Orikasa (JPN)
20 August 2017; 09:00	Report	Score by quarters: 5–3, 3–1, 3–2, 0–1			Hsinchu County Natatorium; Referees: Jean-Francois Morisseau (CAN); Keiichi Orikasa (JPN)
20 August 2017; 09:00	Report	Elliot 3	Goals	Youn Y-g 3	Hsinchu County Natatorium; Referees: Jean-Francois Morisseau (CAN); Keiichi Orikasa (JPN)

20 August 2017; 10:20	Report	Chinese Taipei	0–27	France	Hsinchu County Natatorium; Referees: Adam Richardson (AUS); Erwin Schapers (NED)
20 August 2017; 10:20	Report	Score by quarters: 0–4, 0–8, 0–6, 0–9			Hsinchu County Natatorium; Referees: Adam Richardson (AUS); Erwin Schapers (NED)
20 August 2017; 10:20	Report		Goals	Mustur 9	Hsinchu County Natatorium; Referees: Adam Richardson (AUS); Erwin Schapers (NED)

21 August 2017; 09:00	Report	Chinese Taipei	2–18	Great Britain	Hsinchu County Natatorium; Referees: Balázs Székely (HUN); Hiroaki Ogino (JPN)
21 August 2017; 09:00	Report	Score by quarters: 0–3, 2–4, 0–7, 0–4			Hsinchu County Natatorium; Referees: Balázs Székely (HUN); Hiroaki Ogino (JPN)
21 August 2017; 09:00	Report	An T-f, Ko J-y 1	Goals	Paddon, Tinkler Davies 4	Hsinchu County Natatorium; Referees: Balázs Székely (HUN); Hiroaki Ogino (JPN)

21 August 2017; 10:20	Report	France	16–8	South Korea	Hsinchu County Natatorium; Referees: Michael Baty (RSA); Adam Richardson (AUS)
21 August 2017; 10:20	Report	Score by quarters: 6–2, 2–2, 5–4, 3–0			Hsinchu County Natatorium; Referees: Michael Baty (RSA); Adam Richardson (AUS)
21 August 2017; 10:20	Report	Caumette, Canonne 3	Goals	Han H-m 3	Hsinchu County Natatorium; Referees: Michael Baty (RSA); Adam Richardson (AUS)

==== Group B ====
Team	Pld	W	D	L	GF	GA	GD	Pts
Netherlands	3	3	0	0	36	14	+22	6
Italy	3	2	0	1	31	15	+16	4
Australia	3	1	0	2	21	22	−1	2
Argentina	3	0	0	3	13	50	−37	0

18 August 2017; 11:40	Report	Italy	6–8	Netherlands	Hsinchu County Natatorium; Referees: Marie Deslieres (CAN); Stephen O'Brien (IRL)
18 August 2017; 11:40	Report	Score by quarters: 1–3, 0–3, 3–1, 2–1			Hsinchu County Natatorium; Referees: Marie Deslieres (CAN); Stephen O'Brien (IRL)
18 August 2017; 11:40	Report	six players 1	Goals	Nispeling, Muller 2	Hsinchu County Natatorium; Referees: Marie Deslieres (CAN); Stephen O'Brien (IRL)

18 August 2017; 13:00	Report	Australia	13–6	Argentina	Hsinchu County Natatorium; Referees: Hiroaki Ogino (JPN); Michael Baty (RSA)
18 August 2017; 13:00	Report	Score by quarters: 3–1, 2–1, 3–1, 5–3			Hsinchu County Natatorium; Referees: Hiroaki Ogino (JPN); Michael Baty (RSA)
18 August 2017; 13:00	Report	Trabinger 3	Goals	Olivieri 2	Hsinchu County Natatorium; Referees: Hiroaki Ogino (JPN); Michael Baty (RSA)

20 August 2017; 11:40	Report	Argentina	3–19	Netherlands	Hsinchu County Natatorium; Referees: Damien Taylor (GBR); Hiroaki Ogino (JPN)
20 August 2017; 11:40	Report	Score by quarters: 1–4, 1–3, 0–6, 1–6			Hsinchu County Natatorium; Referees: Damien Taylor (GBR); Hiroaki Ogino (JPN)
20 August 2017; 11:40	Report	three players 1	Goals	Koopman 6	Hsinchu County Natatorium; Referees: Damien Taylor (GBR); Hiroaki Ogino (JPN)

20 August 2017; 13:00	Report	Italy	7–3	Australia	Hsinchu County Natatorium; Referees: Maxim Gerasimov (GBR); Attila Marosvari (HUN)
20 August 2017; 13:00	Report	Score by quarters: 1–1, 4–1, 1–1, 1–0			Hsinchu County Natatorium; Referees: Maxim Gerasimov (GBR); Attila Marosvari (HUN)
20 August 2017; 13:00	Report	Bruni 3	Goals	Trabinger 2	Hsinchu County Natatorium; Referees: Maxim Gerasimov (GBR); Attila Marosvari (HUN)

21 August 2017; 11:40	Report	Italy	18–4	Argentina	Hsinchu County Natatorium; Referees: Pascal Bouchez (FRA); Amber Drury (USA)
21 August 2017; 11:40	Report	Score by quarters: 4–1, 6–1, 4–1, 4–1			Hsinchu County Natatorium; Referees: Pascal Bouchez (FRA); Amber Drury (USA)
21 August 2017; 11:40	Report	Di Somma 5	Goals	four players 1	Hsinchu County Natatorium; Referees: Pascal Bouchez (FRA); Amber Drury (USA)

21 August 2017; 13:00	Report	Australia	5–9	Netherlands	Hsinchu County Natatorium; Referees: Marie Deslieres (CAN); Humberto Navarro (USA)
21 August 2017; 13:00	Report	Score by quarters: 1–4, 3–1, 1–1, 0–3			Hsinchu County Natatorium; Referees: Marie Deslieres (CAN); Humberto Navarro (USA)
21 August 2017; 13:00	Report	Brooks 3	Goals	Lindhout 3	Hsinchu County Natatorium; Referees: Marie Deslieres (CAN); Humberto Navarro (USA)

==== Group C ====
Team	Pld	W	D	L	GF	GA	GD	Pts
Serbia	3	3	0	0	49	7	+42	6
Hungary	3	2	0	1	45	16	+29	4
Canada	3	1	0	2	13	49	−36	2
South Africa	3	0	0	3	10	45	−35	0

18 August 2017; 14:20	Report	Hungary	17–3	Canada	Hsinchu County Natatorium; Referees: Pascal Bouchez (FRA); Marco Ercoli (ITA)
18 August 2017; 14:20	Report	Score by quarters: 4–1, 5–0, 4–0, 4–2			Hsinchu County Natatorium; Referees: Pascal Bouchez (FRA); Marco Ercoli (ITA)
18 August 2017; 14:20	Report	Jansik 4	Goals	three players 1	Hsinchu County Natatorium; Referees: Pascal Bouchez (FRA); Marco Ercoli (ITA)

18 August 2017; 15:40	Report	Serbia	13–1	South Africa	Hsinchu County Natatorium; Referees: Han Soo-chan (KOR); Radu-Sorin Matache (ROU)
18 August 2017; 15:40	Report	Score by quarters: 3–0, 2–0, 5–1, 3–0			Hsinchu County Natatorium; Referees: Han Soo-chan (KOR); Radu-Sorin Matache (ROU)
18 August 2017; 15:40	Report	Drašović, Vasić 3	Goals	Evezard 1	Hsinchu County Natatorium; Referees: Han Soo-chan (KOR); Radu-Sorin Matache (ROU)

20 August 2017; 14:20	Report	South Africa	4–8	Canada	Hsinchu County Natatorium; Referees: David Couper (NZL); Chang Wan Yu (TPE)
20 August 2017; 14:20	Report	Score by quarters: 0–3, 2–2, 1–2, 1–1			Hsinchu County Natatorium; Referees: David Couper (NZL); Chang Wan Yu (TPE)
20 August 2017; 14:20	Report	four players 1	Goals	Thumwood 4	Hsinchu County Natatorium; Referees: David Couper (NZL); Chang Wan Yu (TPE)

20 August 2017; 15:40	Report	Hungary	4–8	Serbia	Hsinchu County Natatorium; Referees: Jaume Teixido (ESP); Andreas Moiralis (GRE)
20 August 2017; 15:40	Report	Score by quarters: 1–1, 0–1, 2–0, 1–6			Hsinchu County Natatorium; Referees: Jaume Teixido (ESP); Andreas Moiralis (GRE)
20 August 2017; 15:40	Report	four players 1	Goals	Subotić 3	Hsinchu County Natatorium; Referees: Jaume Teixido (ESP); Andreas Moiralis (GRE)

21 August 2017; 14:20	Report	Hungary	24–5	South Africa	Hsinchu County Natatorium; Referees: Leonadro Ceccarelli (ITA); Jang Shi-young (KOR)
21 August 2017; 14:20	Report	Score by quarters: 8–1, 4–2, 7–1, 5–1			Hsinchu County Natatorium; Referees: Leonadro Ceccarelli (ITA); Jang Shi-young (KOR)
21 August 2017; 14:20	Report	G. Kovács, P. Kovács 5	Goals	Evezard 2	Hsinchu County Natatorium; Referees: Leonadro Ceccarelli (ITA); Jang Shi-young (KOR)

21 August 2017; 15:40	Report	Serbia	28–2	Canada	Hsinchu County Natatorium; Referees: Jaume Teixido (ESP); Marco Ercoli (ITA)
21 August 2017; 15:40	Report	Score by quarters: 6–0, 8–0, 7–0, 7–2			Hsinchu County Natatorium; Referees: Jaume Teixido (ESP); Marco Ercoli (ITA)
21 August 2017; 15:40	Report	Drašović 5	Goals	Chapman, Graham 1	Hsinchu County Natatorium; Referees: Jaume Teixido (ESP); Marco Ercoli (ITA)

==== Group D ====
Team	Pld	W	D	L	GF	GA	GD	Pts
Russia	3	2	1	0	33	22	+11	5
Japan	3	2	0	1	32	23	+9	4
United States	3	1	1	1	31	26	+5	3
Romania	3	0	0	3	18	43	−25	0

18 August 2017; 17:00	Report	United States	8–9	Japan	Hsinchu County Natatorium; Referees: Jaume Teixido (ESP); Leonadro Ceccarelli (ITA)
18 August 2017; 17:00	Report	Score by quarters: 2–2, 3–1, 3–3, 0–3			Hsinchu County Natatorium; Referees: Jaume Teixido (ESP); Leonadro Ceccarelli (ITA)
18 August 2017; 17:00	Report	three players 2	Goals	Adachi 3	Hsinchu County Natatorium; Referees: Jaume Teixido (ESP); Leonadro Ceccarelli (ITA)

18 August 2017; 18:20	Report	Russia	14–5	Romania	Hsinchu County Natatorium; Referees: Adam Richardson (AUS); Damien Taylor (GBR)
18 August 2017; 18:20	Report	Score by quarters: 4–0, 5–1, 3–2, 2–2			Hsinchu County Natatorium; Referees: Adam Richardson (AUS); Damien Taylor (GBR)
18 August 2017; 18:20	Report	Shepelev 3	Goals	Vancsik 2	Hsinchu County Natatorium; Referees: Adam Richardson (AUS); Damien Taylor (GBR)

20 August 2017; 17:00	Report	Romania	7–17	Japan	Hsinchu County Natatorium; Referees: Pascal Bouchez (FRA); Igor Virijevic (SRB)
20 August 2017; 17:00	Report	Score by quarters: 0–5, 1–0, 2–9, 4–3			Hsinchu County Natatorium; Referees: Pascal Bouchez (FRA); Igor Virijevic (SRB)
20 August 2017; 17:00	Report	Dragomirescu, Vatrai 2	Goals	Adachi 4	Hsinchu County Natatorium; Referees: Pascal Bouchez (FRA); Igor Virijevic (SRB)

20 August 2017; 18:20	Report	United States	11–11	Russia	Hsinchu County Natatorium; Referees: Balázs Székely (HUN); Marco Ercoli (ITA)
20 August 2017; 18:20	Report	Score by quarters: 3–3, 4–3, 1–3, 3–2			Hsinchu County Natatorium; Referees: Balázs Székely (HUN); Marco Ercoli (ITA)
20 August 2017; 18:20	Report	Stevenson 3	Goals	Lazarev 3	Hsinchu County Natatorium; Referees: Balázs Székely (HUN); Marco Ercoli (ITA)

21 August 2017; 17:00	Report	United States	12–6	Romania	Hsinchu County Natatorium; Referees: Ursula Wengenroth (SUI); Stephen O'Brien (IRL)
21 August 2017; 17:00	Report	Score by quarters: 3–1, 5–0, 2–4, 2–1			Hsinchu County Natatorium; Referees: Ursula Wengenroth (SUI); Stephen O'Brien (IRL)
21 August 2017; 17:00	Report	Obert 3	Goals	Vancsik 2	Hsinchu County Natatorium; Referees: Ursula Wengenroth (SUI); Stephen O'Brien (IRL)

21 August 2017; 18:20	Report	Russia	8–6	Japan	Hsinchu County Natatorium; Referees: Andreas Moiralis (GRE); Attila Marosvari (HUN)
21 August 2017; 18:20	Report	Score by quarters: 1–3, 0–1, 4–0, 3–2			Hsinchu County Natatorium; Referees: Andreas Moiralis (GRE); Attila Marosvari (HUN)
21 August 2017; 18:20	Report	Merkulov 3	Goals	Yoshida 2	Hsinchu County Natatorium; Referees: Andreas Moiralis (GRE); Attila Marosvari (HUN)

== Final round ==
=== Bracket ===
Round of 16
23 August 09:00
France	13
South Africa	5
23 August 10:20
Great Britain	7
Canada	6
23 August 11:40
South Korea	2
Hungary	18
23 August 13:00
Chinese Taipei	1
Serbia	32
23 August 14:20
Netherlands	8
Romania	6
23 August 15:40
Italy	12
United States	9
23 August 17:00
Australia	9
Japan	15
23 August 18:20
Argentina	2
Russia	17

Quarter-finals
25 August 15:00
France	13
Great Britain	4
25 August 16:30
Hungary	7
Serbia	9
25 August 18:00
Netherlands	4
Italy	6
25 August 19:30
Japan	7
Russia	12

Semi-finals
28 August 16:30
France	3
Serbia	10
28 August 18:00
Italy	9
Russia	11

Final
30 August 13:30
Serbia	15
Russia	4
Third place
30 August 12:00
France	2
Italy	10

5–8th place bracket

5th–8th place semifinals
27 August 15:00
Great Britain	2
Hungary	19
27 August 16:30
Netherlands	8
Japan	9

5th place
30 August 10:30
Hungary	14
Japan	8
7th place
30 August 09:00
Great Britain	5
Netherlands	18

9–16th place bracket

13th place
South Africa	11
Romania	17
15th place
Chinese Taipei	2
Argentina	11

13th–16th place semifinals
South Africa	21
Chinese Taipei	3
Romania	10
Argentina	5

9th–16th place quarterfinals
South Africa	6
Canada	7
South Korea	15
Chinese Taipei	4
Romania	9 (1)
United States (p)	9 (4)
Australia	6
Argentina	5

9th–12th place semifinals
Canada	9
South Korea	4
United States	8
Australia	4

9th place
Canada	8
United States	18
11th place
South Korea	3
Australia	18

=== Round of 16 ===
23 August 2017; 09:00	Report	France	13–5	South Africa	Hsinchu County Natatorium; Referees: Leonadro Ceccarelli (ITA); Jang Shi-young (KOR)
23 August 2017; 09:00	Report	Score by quarters: 4–2, 2–1, 4–0, 3–1			Hsinchu County Natatorium; Referees: Leonadro Ceccarelli (ITA); Jang Shi-young (KOR)
23 August 2017; 09:00	Report	Canonne 6	Goals	Evezard 3	Hsinchu County Natatorium; Referees: Leonadro Ceccarelli (ITA); Jang Shi-young (KOR)

23 August 2017; 10:20	Report	Great Britain	7–6	Canada	Hsinchu County Natatorium; Referees: Sebastien Dervieux (FRA); Hiroaki Ogino (JPN)
23 August 2017; 10:20	Report	Score by quarters: 2–3, 1–1, 3–2, 1–0			Hsinchu County Natatorium; Referees: Sebastien Dervieux (FRA); Hiroaki Ogino (JPN)
23 August 2017; 10:20	Report	Harrington 3	Goals	Spooner, Thumwood 2	Hsinchu County Natatorium; Referees: Sebastien Dervieux (FRA); Hiroaki Ogino (JPN)

23 August 2017; 11:40	Report	South Korea	2–18	Hungary	Hsinchu County Natatorium; Referees: Jean-Francois Morisseau (CAN); David Couper (NZL)
23 August 2017; 11:40	Report	Score by quarters: 1–6, 1–4, 0–4, 0–4			Hsinchu County Natatorium; Referees: Jean-Francois Morisseau (CAN); David Couper (NZL)
23 August 2017; 11:40	Report	Youn Y-g, Jang D-o 1	Goals	three players 4	Hsinchu County Natatorium; Referees: Jean-Francois Morisseau (CAN); David Couper (NZL)

23 August 2017; 13:00	Report	Chinese Taipei	1–32	Serbia	Hsinchu County Natatorium; Referees: Michael Baty (RSA); Andreas Moiralis (GRE)
23 August 2017; 13:00	Report	Score by quarters: 0–8, 0–10, 0–11, 1–3			Hsinchu County Natatorium; Referees: Michael Baty (RSA); Andreas Moiralis (GRE)
23 August 2017; 13:00	Report	Ko J-y 1	Goals	Radojević 6	Hsinchu County Natatorium; Referees: Michael Baty (RSA); Andreas Moiralis (GRE)

23 August 2017; 14:20	Report	Netherlands	8–6	Romania	Hsinchu County Natatorium; Referees: Irfan Sadekov (RUS); Humberto Navarro (USA)
23 August 2017; 14:20	Report	Score by quarters: 4–2, 3–1, 1–2, 0–1			Hsinchu County Natatorium; Referees: Irfan Sadekov (RUS); Humberto Navarro (USA)
23 August 2017; 14:20	Report	Koopman 3	Goals	Gergelyfi 2	Hsinchu County Natatorium; Referees: Irfan Sadekov (RUS); Humberto Navarro (USA)

23 August 2017; 15:40	Report	Italy	12–9	United States	Hsinchu County Natatorium; Referees: Andrew Carney (AUS); Balázs Székely (HUN)
23 August 2017; 15:40	Report	Score by quarters: 1–1, 3–1, 4–4, 4–3			Hsinchu County Natatorium; Referees: Andrew Carney (AUS); Balázs Székely (HUN)
23 August 2017; 15:40	Report	Manzi 4	Goals	Araya 3	Hsinchu County Natatorium; Referees: Andrew Carney (AUS); Balázs Székely (HUN)

23 August 2017; 17:00	Report	Australia	9–15	Japan	Hsinchu County Natatorium; Referees: Pascal Bouchez (FRA); Igor Virijević (SRB)
23 August 2017; 17:00	Report	Score by quarters: 2–3, 3–2, 2–5, 2–5			Hsinchu County Natatorium; Referees: Pascal Bouchez (FRA); Igor Virijević (SRB)
23 August 2017; 17:00	Report	three players 2	Goals	Arai 4	Hsinchu County Natatorium; Referees: Pascal Bouchez (FRA); Igor Virijević (SRB)

23 August 2017; 18:20	Report	Argentina	2–17	Russia	Hsinchu County Natatorium; Referees: Keiichi Orikasa (JPN); Maxim Gerasimov (GBR)
23 August 2017; 18:20	Report	Score by quarters: 1–3, 1–2, 0–7, 0–5			Hsinchu County Natatorium; Referees: Keiichi Orikasa (JPN); Maxim Gerasimov (GBR)
23 August 2017; 18:20	Report	Galimberti 2	Goals	Lazarev, Merkulov 3	Hsinchu County Natatorium; Referees: Keiichi Orikasa (JPN); Maxim Gerasimov (GBR)

=== 9th–16th place quarterfinals ===
25 August 2017; 09:00	Report	South Africa	6–7	Canada	Hsinchu County Natatorium; Referees: Adam Richardson (AUS); Sebastien Dervieux (FRA)
25 August 2017; 09:00	Report	Score by quarters: 2–3, 2–2, 0–1, 2–1			Hsinchu County Natatorium; Referees: Adam Richardson (AUS); Sebastien Dervieux (FRA)
25 August 2017; 09:00	Report	Evezard 3	Goals	Spooner 3	Hsinchu County Natatorium; Referees: Adam Richardson (AUS); Sebastien Dervieux (FRA)

25 August 2017; 10:30	Report	South Korea	15–4	Chinese Taipei	Hsinchu County Natatorium; Referees: Michael Baty (RSA); Hiroaki Ogino (JPN)
25 August 2017; 10:30	Report	Score by quarters: 4–2, 2–1, 5–1, 4–0			Hsinchu County Natatorium; Referees: Michael Baty (RSA); Hiroaki Ogino (JPN)
25 August 2017; 10:30	Report	Youn 7	Goals	four players 1	Hsinchu County Natatorium; Referees: Michael Baty (RSA); Hiroaki Ogino (JPN)

25 August 2017; 12:00	Report	Romania	9–9 ^{(1–4 PSO)} (PSO)	United States	Hsinchu County Natatorium; Referees: Jean-Francois Morisseau (CAN); Irfan Sadekov (RUS)
25 August 2017; 12:00	Report	Score by quarters: 2–2, 1–3, 3–3, 3–1 PSO: 1–4			Hsinchu County Natatorium; Referees: Jean-Francois Morisseau (CAN); Irfan Sadekov (RUS)
25 August 2017; 12:00	Report	three players 2	Goals	four players 2	Hsinchu County Natatorium; Referees: Jean-Francois Morisseau (CAN); Irfan Sadekov (RUS)

25 August 2017; 13:30	Report	Australia	6–5	Argentina	Hsinchu County Natatorium; Referees: David Couper (NZL); Damien Taylor (GBR)
25 August 2017; 13:30	Report	Score by quarters: 2–1, 2–2, 1–1, 1–1			Hsinchu County Natatorium; Referees: David Couper (NZL); Damien Taylor (GBR)
25 August 2017; 13:30	Report	Reeves 2	Goals	Galimberti 2	Hsinchu County Natatorium; Referees: David Couper (NZL); Damien Taylor (GBR)

=== Quarterfinals ===
25 August 2017; 15:00	Report	France	13–4	Great Britain	Hsinchu County Natatorium; Referees: Leonadro Ceccarelli (ITA); Keiichi Orikasa (JPN)
25 August 2017; 15:00	Report	Score by quarters: 4–1, 2–1, 6–1, 1–1			Hsinchu County Natatorium; Referees: Leonadro Ceccarelli (ITA); Keiichi Orikasa (JPN)
25 August 2017; 15:00	Report	Canonne 5	Goals	Hirsch 2	Hsinchu County Natatorium; Referees: Leonadro Ceccarelli (ITA); Keiichi Orikasa (JPN)

25 August 2017; 16:30	Report	Hungary	7–9	Serbia	Hsinchu County Natatorium; Referees: Marco Ercoli (ITA); Radu-Sorin Matache (ROU)
25 August 2017; 16:30	Report	Score by quarters: 2–4, 0–2, 2–2, 3–1			Hsinchu County Natatorium; Referees: Marco Ercoli (ITA); Radu-Sorin Matache (ROU)
25 August 2017; 16:30	Report	Jansik 4	Goals	Rašović 3	Hsinchu County Natatorium; Referees: Marco Ercoli (ITA); Radu-Sorin Matache (ROU)

25 August 2017; 18:00	Report	Netherlands	4–6	Italy	Hsinchu County Natatorarium; Referees: Andreas Moiralis (GRE); Humberto Navarro (USA)
25 August 2017; 18:00	Report	Score by quarters: 0–0, 2–2, 1–2, 1–2			Hsinchu County Natatorarium; Referees: Andreas Moiralis (GRE); Humberto Navarro (USA)
25 August 2017; 18:00	Report	four players 1	Goals	Dolce 2	Hsinchu County Natatorarium; Referees: Andreas Moiralis (GRE); Humberto Navarro (USA)

25 August 2017; 19:30	Report	Japan	7–12	Russia	Hsinchu County Natatorium; Referees: Jaume Teixido (ESP); Igor Virijević (SRB)
25 August 2017; 19:30	Report	Score by quarters: 3–3, 0–4, 2–4, 2–1			Hsinchu County Natatorium; Referees: Jaume Teixido (ESP); Igor Virijević (SRB)
25 August 2017; 19:30	Report	Adachi 3	Goals	four players 2	Hsinchu County Natatorium; Referees: Jaume Teixido (ESP); Igor Virijević (SRB)

=== 13th–16th place semifinals ===
27 August 2017; 09:00	Report	South Africa	21–3	Chinese Taipei	Hsinchu County Natatorium; Referees: Radu-Sorin Matache (ROU); Jang Shi-young (KOR)
27 August 2017; 09:00	Report	Score by quarters: 7–1, 5–1, 5–1, 4–0			Hsinchu County Natatorium; Referees: Radu-Sorin Matache (ROU); Jang Shi-young (KOR)
27 August 2017; 09:00	Report	Evezard 7	Goals	An 2	Hsinchu County Natatorium; Referees: Radu-Sorin Matache (ROU); Jang Shi-young (KOR)

27 August 2017; 10:30	Report	Romania	10–5	Argentina	Hsinchu County Natatorium; Referees: Jean-Francois Morisseau (CAN); Igor Virijević (SRB)
27 August 2017; 10:30	Report	Score by quarters: 2–1, 4–0, 1–2, 3–2			Hsinchu County Natatorium; Referees: Jean-Francois Morisseau (CAN); Igor Virijević (SRB)
27 August 2017; 10:30	Report	Fulea 3	Goals	five players 1	Hsinchu County Natatorium; Referees: Jean-Francois Morisseau (CAN); Igor Virijević (SRB)

=== 9th–12th place semifinals ===
27 August 2017; 12:00	Report	Canada	9–4	South Korea	Hsinchu County Natatorium; Referees: Andreas Moiralis (GRE); Chang Wan-yu (TPE)
27 August 2017; 12:00	Report	Score by quarters: 0–0, 2–0, 5–2, 2–2			Hsinchu County Natatorium; Referees: Andreas Moiralis (GRE); Chang Wan-yu (TPE)
27 August 2017; 12:00	Report	D'Souza, Spooner 3	Goals	four players 1	Hsinchu County Natatorium; Referees: Andreas Moiralis (GRE); Chang Wan-yu (TPE)

27 August 2017; 13:30	Report	United States	8–4	Australia	Hsinchu County Natatorium; Referees: Sebastien Dervieux (FRA); Marco Ercoli (ITA)
27 August 2017; 13:30	Report	Score by quarters: 2–1, 3–0, 1–2, 2–1			Hsinchu County Natatorium; Referees: Sebastien Dervieux (FRA); Marco Ercoli (ITA)
27 August 2017; 13:30	Report	three players 2	Goals	Flanagan 2	Hsinchu County Natatorium; Referees: Sebastien Dervieux (FRA); Marco Ercoli (ITA)

=== 5th–8th semifinals ===
27 August 2017; 15:00	Report	Great Britain	2–19	Hungary	Hsinchu County Natatorium; Referees: Hiroaki Ogino (JPN); Adam Richardson (AUS)
27 August 2017; 15:00	Report	Score by quarters: 0–7, 1–5, 1–3, 0–4			Hsinchu County Natatorium; Referees: Hiroaki Ogino (JPN); Adam Richardson (AUS)
27 August 2017; 15:00	Report	Brown, Paddon 1	Goals	Gyárfás 6	Hsinchu County Natatorium; Referees: Hiroaki Ogino (JPN); Adam Richardson (AUS)

27 August 2017; 16:30	Report	Netherlands	8–9	Japan	Hsinchu County Natatorium; Referees: Vladimir Gerzanich (RUS); David Couper (NZL)
27 August 2017; 16:30	Report	Score by quarters: 2–2, 2–3, 2–1, 2–3			Hsinchu County Natatorium; Referees: Vladimir Gerzanich (RUS); David Couper (NZL)
27 August 2017; 16:30	Report	Lindhout, Reuten 2	Goals	Adachi, Yoshida 3	Hsinchu County Natatorium; Referees: Vladimir Gerzanich (RUS); David Couper (NZL)

=== Semifinals ===
28 August 2017; 16:30	Report	France	3–10	Serbia	National Taiwan Sport University Arena; Referees: Balázs Székely (HUN); Humberto Navarro (USA)
28 August 2017; 16:30	Report	Score by quarters: 1–2, 0–3, 0–3, 2–2			National Taiwan Sport University Arena; Referees: Balázs Székely (HUN); Humberto Navarro (USA)
28 August 2017; 16:30	Report	Mustur 2	Goals	three players 2	National Taiwan Sport University Arena; Referees: Balázs Székely (HUN); Humberto Navarro (USA)

28 August 2017; 18:00	Report	Italy	9–11	Russia	National Taiwan Sport University Arena; Referees: Andreas Moiralis (GRE); Igor Virijević (SRB)
28 August 2017; 18:00	Report	Score by quarters: 1–4, 1–3, 3–2, 4–2			National Taiwan Sport University Arena; Referees: Andreas Moiralis (GRE); Igor Virijević (SRB)
28 August 2017; 18:00	Report	Dolce 3	Goals	Kharkov 3	National Taiwan Sport University Arena; Referees: Andreas Moiralis (GRE); Igor Virijević (SRB)

=== 15th place match ===
29 August 2017; 09:00	Report	Chinese Taipei	2–11	Argentina	National Taiwan Sport University Arena; Referees: Maxim Gerasimov (GBR); Jang Shi-young (KOR)
29 August 2017; 09:00	Report	Score by quarters: 0–4, 1–4, 0–2, 1–1			National Taiwan Sport University Arena; Referees: Maxim Gerasimov (GBR); Jang Shi-young (KOR)
29 August 2017; 09:00	Report	Chou, Ko 1	Goals	Olivieri 4	National Taiwan Sport University Arena; Referees: Maxim Gerasimov (GBR); Jang Shi-young (KOR)

=== 13th place match ===
29 August 2017; 10:30	Report	South Africa	11–17	Romania	National Taiwan Sport University Arena; Referees: David Couper (NZL); Adam Richardson (AUS)
29 August 2017; 10:30	Report	Score by quarters: 1–4, 5–5, 1–4, 4–4			National Taiwan Sport University Arena; Referees: David Couper (NZL); Adam Richardson (AUS)
29 August 2017; 10:30	Report	four players 2	Goals	Vancsik 6	National Taiwan Sport University Arena; Referees: David Couper (NZL); Adam Richardson (AUS)

=== 11th place match ===
29 August 2017; 12:00	Report	South Korea	3–18	Australia	National Taiwan Sport University Arena; Referees: Damien Taylor (GBR); Jean-Francois Morisseau (CAN)
29 August 2017; 12:00	Report	Score by quarters: 1–5, 2–1, 0–7, 0–5			National Taiwan Sport University Arena; Referees: Damien Taylor (GBR); Jean-Francois Morisseau (CAN)
29 August 2017; 12:00	Report	three players 1	Goals	Brooks 5	National Taiwan Sport University Arena; Referees: Damien Taylor (GBR); Jean-Francois Morisseau (CAN)

=== 9th place match ===
29 August 2017; 13:30	Report	Canada	8–18	United States	National Taiwan Sport University Arena; Referees: Keiichi Orikasa (JPN); Radu-Sorin Matache (ROU)
29 August 2017; 13:30	Report	Score by quarters: 2–4, 1–5, 0–3, 5–6			National Taiwan Sport University Arena; Referees: Keiichi Orikasa (JPN); Radu-Sorin Matache (ROU)
29 August 2017; 13:30	Report	Thumwood 4	Goals	Stevenson 5	National Taiwan Sport University Arena; Referees: Keiichi Orikasa (JPN); Radu-Sorin Matache (ROU)

=== 7th place match ===
30 August 2017; 09:00	Report	Great Britain	5–18	Netherlands	National Taiwan Sport University Arena; Referees: Pascal Bouchez (FRA); Radu-Sorin Matache (ROU)
30 August 2017; 09:00	Report	Score by quarters: 2–4, 0–4, 3–6, 0–4			National Taiwan Sport University Arena; Referees: Pascal Bouchez (FRA); Radu-Sorin Matache (ROU)
30 August 2017; 09:00	Report	Elliot 2	Goals	Lindhout, Koopman 4	National Taiwan Sport University Arena; Referees: Pascal Bouchez (FRA); Radu-Sorin Matache (ROU)

=== 5th place match ===
30 August 2017; 10:30	Report	Hungary	14–8	Japan	National Taiwan Sport University Arena; Referees: Sebastien Dervieux (FRA); Marco Ercoli (ITA)
30 August 2017; 10:30	Report	Score by quarters: 3–2, 6–3, 3–3, 2–1			National Taiwan Sport University Arena; Referees: Sebastien Dervieux (FRA); Marco Ercoli (ITA)
30 August 2017; 10:30	Report	three players 3	Goals	Inaba 3	National Taiwan Sport University Arena; Referees: Sebastien Dervieux (FRA); Marco Ercoli (ITA)

=== Third place match ===
30 August 2017; 12:00	Report	France	2–10	Italy	National Taiwan Sport University Arena; Referees: Irfan Sadekov (RUS); Stephen O'Brien (IRL)
30 August 2017; 12:00	Report	Score by quarters: 0–2, 1–3, 1–2, 0–3			National Taiwan Sport University Arena; Referees: Irfan Sadekov (RUS); Stephen O'Brien (IRL)
30 August 2017; 12:00	Report	Chandieu 2	Goals	Ravina 3	National Taiwan Sport University Arena; Referees: Irfan Sadekov (RUS); Stephen O'Brien (IRL)

=== Final ===
30 August 2017; 13:30	Report	Serbia	15–4	Russia	National Taiwan Sport University Arena; Referees: Attila Marosvari (HUN); Jaume Teixido (ESP)
30 August 2017; 13:30	Report	Score by quarters: 3–0, 5–2, 4–2, 3–0			National Taiwan Sport University Arena; Referees: Attila Marosvari (HUN); Jaume Teixido (ESP)
30 August 2017; 13:30	Report	five players 2	Goals	Kholod 2	National Taiwan Sport University Arena; Referees: Attila Marosvari (HUN); Jaume Teixido (ESP)

== Final standing ==
Rank	Team
1st place, gold medalist(s)	Serbia
2nd place, silver medalist(s)	Russia
3rd place, bronze medalist(s)	Italy
4	France
5	Hungary
6	Japan
7	Netherlands
8	Great Britain
9	United States
10	Canada
11	Australia
12	South Korea
13	Romania
14	South Africa
15	Argentina
16	Chinese Taipei
