= Water polo at the 2018 Asian Games =

- Venue: Gelora Bung Karno Aquatic Stadium
- Dates: 16 August – 1 September 2018
- Competitors: 195 from 10 nations

Water polo at the 2018 Asian Games was held at the Gelora Bung Karno Aquatic Stadium, Gelora Bung Karno Sports Complex, Jakarta, Indonesia from 16 August to 1 September. Ten countries with 9 men's team and 6 women's team participated in the competition.

== Schedule ==
●	Round	●	Last round	P	Preliminary round	¼	Quarterfinals	½	Semifinals	F	Finals

Event↓/Date →	16th Thu	17th Fri	18th Sat	19th Sun	20th Mon	21st Tue	22nd Wed	23rd Thu	24th Fri	25th Sat	26th Sun	27th Mon	28th Tue	29th Wed	30th Thu	31st Fri	1st Sat
Men										P	P	P	P	P	¼	½	F
Women	●	●		●	●	●											

== Medalists ==
Event	Gold	Silver	Bronze
Men	Kazakhstan; Pavel Lipilin; Yevgeniy Medvedev; Ruslan Akhmetov; Roman Pilipenko; Miras Aubakirov; Alexey Shmider; Murat Shakenov; Altay Altayev; Rustam Ukumanov; Mikhail Ruday; Ravil Manafov; Yulian Verdesh; Valeriy Shlemov	Japan; Katsuyuki Tanamura; Seiya Adachi; Harukiirario Koppu; Mitsuaki Shiga; Takuma Yoshida; Atsuto Iida; Takumu Miyazawa; Mitsuru Takata; Atsushi Arai; Yusuke Inaba; Keigo Okawa; Kenta Araki; Tomoyoshi Fukushima	Iran; Omid Lotfpour; Peyman Asadi; Amir Hossein Rahbar; Hamed Malek-Khanbanan; Amir Hossein Keyhani; Ali Pirouzkhah; Amir Dehdari; Mehdi Yazdankhah; Soheil Rostamian; Mohammad Javad Abbasi; Arshia Almasi; Hossein Khaledi; Shayan Ghasemi
Women	China; Peng Lin; Zhai Ying; Mei Xiaohan; Xiong Dunhan; Niu Guannan; Guo Ning; Nong Sanfeng; Zhang Cong; Wang Huan; Zhang Danyi; Chen Xiao; Zhang Jing; Shen Yineng	Kazakhstan; Alexandra Zharkimbayeva; Oxana Saichuk; Aizhan Akilbayeva; Anna Turova; Anastassiya Yeremina; Darya Roga; Anna Novikova; Sivilya Raiter; Shakhzoda Mansurova; Zamira Myrzabekova; Anastassiya Mirshina; Anastassiya Murataliyeva; Azhar Alibayeva	Japan; Minami Shioya; Yumi Arima; Akari Inaba; Shino Magariyama; Chiaki Sakanoue; Minori Yamamoto; Maiko Hashida; Yuki Niizawa; Kana Hosoya; Misaki Noro; Marina Tokumoto; Kotori Suzuki; Miyuu Aoki

== Medal table ==
Rank	Nation	Gold	Silver	Bronze	Total
1	Kazakhstan (KAZ)	1	1	0	2
2	China (CHN)	1	0	0	1
3	Japan (JPN)	0	1	1	2
4	Iran (IRI)	0	0	1	1
Totals (4 entries)		2	2	2	6

== Draw ==
A draw ceremony was held on 5 July 2018 to determine the groups for the men's competition. The teams were seeded based on their final ranking at the 2014 Asian Games. The women were played in round robin format.

Group A

- Kazakhstan (1)
- South Korea (4)
- Singapore
- Iran

Group B

- Japan (2)
- China (3)
- Saudi Arabia
- Hong Kong
- Indonesia

== Final standing ==
=== Men ===
Rank	Team	Pld	W	D	L
1st place, gold medalist(s)	Kazakhstan	6	6	0	0
2nd place, silver medalist(s)	Japan	7	6	0	1
3rd place, bronze medalist(s)	Iran	6	4	0	2
4	China	7	4	0	3
5	South Korea	6	3	0	3
6	Singapore	6	1	0	5
7	Saudi Arabia	7	2	1	4
8	Indonesia	7	1	1	5
9	Hong Kong	4	0	0	4

=== Women ===
Rank	Team	Pld	W	D	L
1st place, gold medalist(s)	China	5	5	0	0
2nd place, silver medalist(s)	Kazakhstan	5	4	0	1
3rd place, bronze medalist(s)	Japan	5	3	0	2
4	Thailand	5	2	0	3
5	Indonesia	5	1	0	4
6	Hong Kong	5	0	0	5
