= Mei Xiaohan =

Chinese water polo player (born 1996)

Personal information
- Born: 11 November 1996 (age 29) Anhui, China
- Height: 180 cm (5 ft 11 in)
- Weight: 97 kg (214 lb)

Sport
- Sport: water polo
Medal record
Representing China
Asian Games
Gold medal – first place	2018 Jakarta	Team competition
- Updated on 19 August 2015

Mei Xiaohan (梅笑寒; born 11 November 1996) is a Chinese water polo player.

She was part of the Chinese team at the 2016 Summer Olympics, and the 2015 World Aquatics Championships.

== See also ==
- China at the 2015 World Aquatics Championships
