= Nemanja Vico =

Serbian water polo player

Personal information
- Nationality: Serbian
- Born: 19 November 1994 (age 31) Kotor, Montenegro, Yugoslavia
- Height: 191 cm (75 in)

Sport
- Sport: Water polo
- Handedness: Right
- Position: Centre forward
- Current club: Primorac Kotor

Senior clubs
- Years: Team
- 2017-2021: Pallanuoto Trieste
- 2021-2022: VK Partizan
- 2022-2023: VK Radnički Kragujevac
- 2023-present: Primorac Kotor
National team
Years	Team	Apps	(Gls)
2012-present	Serbia	113	(84)
Medal record
Representing Serbia
Men's water polo
Olympic Games
Gold medal – first place	2024 Paris	Team
European Championships
Gold medal – first place	2018 Barcelona
Gold medal – first place	2026 Belgrade
FINA World League
Gold medal – first place	2019 Belgrade
FINA World Cup
Bronze medal – third place	2018 Berlin
FISU World University Games
Gold medal – first place	2017 Taipei	Team

Nemanja Vico (Serbian Cyrillic: Немања Вицо; born 19 November 1994) is a Serbian water polo player who plays for Primorac Kotor. He represented Serbia at the 2024 Summer Olympics.
