= Okina Kyogoku =

Japanese synchronised swimmer

Personal information
- Nationality: Japanese
- Born: 20 October 2001 (age 24) Japan

Sport
- Sport: Synchronised swimming
Medal record
Representing Japan
Asian Games
Silver medal – second place	2018 Jakarta	Team

Okina Kyogoku (京極 おきな, Kyōgoku Okina, born 20 October 2001) is a Japanese synchronised swimmer. She competed at the 2020 Summer Olympics, in the team event with Yukiko Inui.

== Career ==
She participated in the 2018 Asian Games and 2019 World Aquatics Championships.
