= Atsuto Iida =

Japanese water polo player

Personal information
- Born: 24 December 1993 (age 32)
- Height: 181 cm (5 ft 11 in)
- Weight: 82 kg (181 lb)

Sport
- Sport: Water polo
- Club: Nippon Sport
Medal record
Representing Japan
Asian Games
Silver medal – second place	2018 Jakarta	Team competition

Atsuto Iida (born 24 December 1993) is a water polo player from Japan. He was part of the Japanese team at the 2016 Summer Olympics, where the team was eliminated in the group stage.
