= Donn Stewart =

South African water polo player

Personal information
- Nationality: South Africa
- Born: 22 August 1980 (age 45)

Sport
- Sport: Water polo

Donn Stewart (born 22 August 1980) is a South African water polo player. He competed in the 2020 Summer Olympics.
