= Nicholas Rodda =

South African water polo player

Personal information
- Nationality: South Africa
- Born: 11 October 1992 (age 32)

Sport
- Sport: Water polo

Nicholas Rodda (born 11 October 1992) is a South African water polo player. He competed in the 2020 Summer Olympics.
