= Vincenzo Dolce =

Italian water polo player (born 1995)

Personal information
- Nationality: Italian
- Born: 11 May 1995 (age 31) Brescia, Italy
- Height: 1.95 m (6 ft 5 in)

Sport
- Sport: Water polo
Medal record
World Championships
Silver medal – second place	2022 Budapest	Team
European Championship
Bronze medal – third place	2024 Zagreb
World Cup
Silver medal – second place	2023 Los Angeles
Bronze medal – third place	2026 Sydney
Summer Universiade
Bronze medal – third place	2017 Taipei	Team

Vincenzo Dolce (born 11 May 1995) is an Italian water polo player. He competed in the 2020 Summer Olympics.
