= Lwazi Madi =

South African water polo player

Personal information
- Nationality: South Africa
- Born: 12 December 1994 (age 31) Johannesburg, South Africa

Sport
- Sport: Water polo
- College team: Stellenbosch University

Lwazi Madi (born 12 December 1994) is a South African water polo player. He competed in the 2020 Summer Olympics.
