= Edoardo Di Somma =

Italian water polo player (born 1996)

Personal information
- Nationality: Italian
- Born: 30 September 1996 (age 29) Genoa, Italy
- Height: 185 cm (6 ft 1 in)
Medal record
Men's water polo
Representing Italy
World Championships
Gold medal – first place	2019 Gwangju	Team
Silver medal – second place	2022 Budapest	Team
Silver medal – second place	2024 Doha	Team
European Championship
Bronze medal – third place	2024 Zagreb
World Cup
Silver medal – second place	2023 Los Angeles
Summer Universiade
Bronze medal – third place	2017 Taipei	Team

Edoardo Di Somma (born 30 September 1996) is an Italian water polo player. He represented Italy at the 2024 Summer Olympics.
