= Pavel Lipilin =

Kazakhstani water polo player

Personal information
- Native name: Павел Сергеевич Липилин
- Full name: Pavel Sergeyevich Lipilin
- Born: 11 July 1999 (age 26) Oral, Kazakhstan

Sport
- Country: Kazakhstan
- Sport: Water polo
Medal record
Representing Kazakhstan
Asian Games
Gold medal – first place	2018 Jakarta	Team competition

Pavel Lipilin (Павел Сергеевич Липилин, born 11 July 1999) is a Kazakhstani water polo player. He competed in the 2020 Summer Olympics.
