= Takuma Yoshida =

Japanese water polo player

Personal information
- Nationality: Japan
- Born: 11 October 1994 (age 31) Nagahama, Japan

Sport
- Sport: Water polo
Medal record
Representing Japan
Asian Games
Silver medal – second place	2018 Jakarta	Team

Takuma Yoshida (吉田 拓馬, Yoshida Takuma, born 11 October 1994) is a Japanese water polo player. He competed in the 2020 Summer Olympics.
