= Andrew Ford (water polo) =

Australian water polo player

Personal information
- Nationality: Australia
- Born: 21 April 1995 (age 30); Perth, Australia

Sport
- Sport: Water polo

Andrew Ford (born 21 April 1995) is an Australian water polo player.

Ford was picked in the water polo Sharks squad to compete in the men's water polo tournament at the 2020 Summer Olympics. The team finished joint fourth on points in their pool, but their inferior goal average meant they finished fifth overall and out of medal contention. They were able to upset Croatia in a group stage match 11–8.
