= Harukiirario Koppu =

Japanese water polo player

Personal information
- Born: 28 December 1998 (age 27) Kyoto Prefecture, Japan

Sport
- Country: Japan
- Sport: Water polo
Medal record
Asian Games
Silver medal – second place	2018 Jakarta	Team competition

Harukiirario Koppu (コップ 晴紀イラリオ, Koppu Harukiirario, born 28 December 1998) is a Japanese water polo player. He competed in the 2020 Summer Olympics.
