= Radomir Drašović =

Serbian water polo player (born 1997)

Personal information
- Nationality: Serbian
- Born: 22 July 1997 (age 29) Belgrade, Serbia, Yugoslavia
- Height: 193 cm (76 in)

Sport
- Sport: Water polo
- Current club: Marseille

Senior clubs
- Years: Team
- –: Marseille
Medal record
Men's water polo
Representing Serbia
Olympic Games
Gold medal – first place	2024 Paris	Team
European Championship
Gold medal – first place	2026 Belgrade
Summer Universiade
Gold medal – first place	2017 Taipei	Team

Radomir Drašović (born 22 July 1997) is a Serbian water polo player who plays for Marseille. He represented Serbia at the 2024 Summer Olympics.
