= Tomoyoshi Fukushima =

Japanese water polo player

Personal information
- Born: 3 June 1993 (age 33) Kagoshima, Japan
- Height: 177 cm (5 ft 10 in)
- Weight: 75 kg (165 lb)

Sport
- Sport: Water polo
- Club: Kingfisher74
Medal record
Representing Japan
Asian Games
Silver medal – second place	2014 Incheon	Team
Silver medal – second place	2018 Jakarta	Team

Tomoyoshi Fukushima (福島 丈貴; born 3 June 1993) is a water polo player from Japan. He was part of the Japanese team at the 2016 Summer Olympics, where the team was eliminated in the group stage.

== See also ==
- Japan men's Olympic water polo team records and statistics
- List of men's Olympic water polo tournament goalkeepers
