= Jason Evezard =

South African water polo player

Personal information
- Nationality: South Africa
- Born: 17 August 1997 (age 28) Port Elizabeth, South Africa

Sport
- Sport: Water polo

Jason Evezard (born 17 August 1997) is a South African water polo player. He competed in the 2020 Summer Olympics.
