= Keigo Okawa =

Japanese water polo player

Personal information
- Born: 11 March 1990 (age 36)
- Height: 183 cm (6 ft 0 in)
- Weight: 96 kg (212 lb)

Sport
- Sport: Water polo
- Club: Kingfisher74
Medal record
Representing Japan
Asian Games
Gold medal – first place	2022 Hangzhou	Team
Silver medal – second place	2014 Incheon	Team
Silver medal – second place	2018 Jakarta	Team

Keigo Okawa (大川 慶悟, Ōkawa Keigo; born 11 March 1990) is a water polo player from Japan. He was part of the Japanese team at the 2016 Summer Olympics, where the team was eliminated in the group stage.
