= Atsushi Arai =

Japanese water polo player

Personal information
- Born: 3 February 1994 (age 32) Kawasaki, Kanagawa, Japan
- Height: 168 cm (5 ft 6 in)
- Weight: 62 kg (137 lb)

Sport
- Sport: Water polo
Medal record
Representing Japan
Asian Games
Gold medal – first place	2022 Hangzhou	Team
Silver medal – second place	2014 Incheon	Team
Silver medal – second place	2018 Jakarta	Team

Atsushi Arai (荒井 陸, Arai Atsushi; born 3 February 1994) is a former water polo player from Japan. He was part of the Japanese team at the 2016 Summer Olympics, where the team was eliminated in the group stage. Arai also represented Japan at the 2020 Summer Olympics.
