= Seiya Adachi =

Japanese water polo player (born 1995)

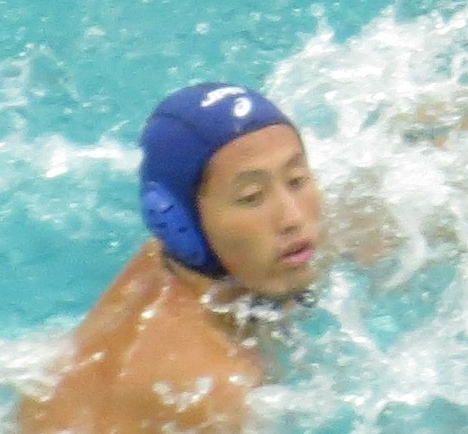

Personal information
- Born: 24 June 1995 (age 31)
- Height: 172 cm (5 ft 8 in)
- Weight: 67 kg (148 lb)

Sport
- Sport: Water polo
- Club: Digi Oradea
Medal record
Men's water polo
Representing Japan
Asian Games
Gold medal – first place	2022 Hangzhou	Team
Gold medal – first place	2026 Aichi–Nagoya	Team
Silver medal – second place	2014 Incheon	Team
Silver medal – second place	2018 Jakarta	Team

Seiya Adachi (足立 聖弥, Adachi Seiya; born 24 June 1995) is a water polo player from Japan. He was part of the Japanese team at the 2016 Summer Olympics, where the team was eliminated in the group stage.
