= List of World Aquatics Championships medalists in water polo =

This is a list of World Aquatics Championships medalists in water polo.

== Men ==
=== Medalists by tournament ===
Abbreviation and legend

- ^{*} – Host team
- ^{†} – Defunct team

Games	Gold	Silver	Bronze
1973 Belgrade	Hungary; Balazs Balla; András Bodnár; Gábor Csapó; Tibor Cservenyák; Tamás Faragó; István Görgényi; Zoltán Kásás; Ferenc Konrád; Endre Molnár; László Sárosi; István Szívós Jr.	Soviet Union^{†} Anatoly Akimov; Aleksei Barkalov; Aleksandr Dreval; Andrey Frolov; Aleksandr Kabanov; Yuri Mityanin; Nuzgari Mshvenieradze; Leonid Osipov; Vitaly Romanchuk; Sergey Shevernyov; Vladimir Zhmudsky	Yugoslavia^{*†} Siniša Belamarić; Ozren Bonačić; Milan Franković; Boško Lozica; Predrag Manojlović; Miloš Marković; Đorđe Perišić; Damir Polić; Ratko Rudić; Đuro Savinović; Nikola Stamenić
1975 Cali	Soviet Union^{†} Aleksei Barkalov; Aleksandr Dolgushin; Aleksandr Dreval; Sergey Gorshkov; Aleksandr Kabanov; Anatoly Klebanov; Nikolay Melnikov; Aleksandr Rodionov; Vitaly Romanchuk; Vitaly Rozhkov; Aleksandr Zakharov	Hungary; András Bodnár; Gábor Csapó; Tibor Cservenyák; Tamás Faragó; István Görgényi; György Horkai; Ferenc Konrád; István Magas; Endre Molnár; László Sárosi; István Szívós Jr.	Italy; Alberto Alberani; Silvio Baracchini; Luigi Castagnola; Roberto Castagnola; Vincenzo D'Angelo; Gianni De Magistris; Marcello Del Duca; Alessandro Ghibellini; Sante Marsili; Mario Scotti-Galletta; Roldano Simeoni
1978 West Berlin	Italy; Alberto Alberani; Silvio Baracchini; Romeo Collina; Gianni De Magistris; Massimo Fondelli; Marco Galli; Alessandro Ghibellini; Sante Marsili; Paolo Ragosa; Mario Scotti-Galletta; Roldano Simeoni	Hungary; Gábor Csapó; Tamás Faragó; Szilveszter Fekete; György Gerendás; György Horkai; György Kenéz; István Magas; Endre Molnár; József Somossy; Attila Sudár; István Szívós Jr.	Yugoslavia^{†} Siniša Belamarić; Mirsad Galijaš; Zoran Gopčević; Boško Lozica; Predrag Manojlović; Zoran Mustur; Damir Polić; Zoran Roje; Slobodan Trifunović; Luka Vezilić; Predrag Vraneš
1982 Guayaquil	Soviet Union^{†} Vladimir Akimov; Mikheil Giorgadze; Yevgeny Grishin; Mikhail Ivanov; Aleksandr Kabanov; Alexander Kleymenov; Sergey Kotenko; Nurlan Mendygaliyev; Giorgi Mshvenieradze; Erkin Shagaev; Yevgeny Sharonov; Nikolai Smirnov; Aleksey Vdovin	Hungary; László Bors; Imre Budavári; Gábor Csapó; Tibor Cservenyák; György Gerendás; György Horkai; György Kenéz; István Kiss; László Kuncz; Gábor Schmiedt; Attila Sudár; Sándor Tóth; János Varga	West Germany^{†} Frank Blümlein; Roland Freund; Rainer Hoppe; Günter Kilian; Thomas Loebb; Ralf Obschernikat; Werner Obschernikat; Rainer Osselmann; Frank Otto; Peter Röhle; Jürgen Schröder; Hagen Stamm; Bernd Weyer
1986 Madrid	Yugoslavia^{†} Dragan Andrić; Perica Bukić; Veselin Đuho; Milorad Krivokapić; Deni Lušić; Igor Milanović; Tomislav Paškvalin; Zoran Petrović; Andrija Popović; Dubravko Šimenc; Goran Sukno; Anto Vasović; Mirko Vičević	Italy; Gianni Averaimo; Paolo Caldarella; Alessandro Campagna; Marco D'Altrui; Massimiliano Ferretti; Mario Fiorillo; Alfio Misaggi; Andrea Pisano; Francesco Porzio; Stefano Postiglione; Antonello Steardo; Riccardo Tempestini; Paolo Trapanese	Soviet Union^{†} Dmitry Apanasenko; Viktor Berendyuha; Yevgeny Grishin; Mikhail Ivanov; Sergey Kotenko; Serghei Marcoci; Nurlan Mendygaliyev; Giorgi Mshvenieradze; Sergey Naumov; Pavel Prokopchuk; Nikolay Sharafeyev; Yevgeny Sharonov; Nikolai Smirnov
1991 Perth	Yugoslavia^{†} Mislav Bezmalinović; Perica Bukić; Viktor Jelenić; Igor Milanović; Vitomir Padovan; Dušan Popović; Renco Posinković; Goran Rađenović; Dubravko Šimenc; Aleksandar Šoštar; Vaso Subotić; Anto Vasović; Mirko Vičević	Spain; Daniel Ballart; Manuel Estiarte; Pedro García; Salvador Gómez; Marco Antonio González; Rubén Michavila; Miki Oca; Josep Picó; Jesús Rollán; Ricardo Sánchez; Jordi Sans; Manuel Silvestre; Juan Valls	Hungary; Tibor Benedek; István Dóczi; Péter Kuna; Csaba Mészáros; Gábor Nemes; Imre Péter; Zsolt Petőváry; Gábor Schmiedt; Tibor Sprok; Frank Tóth; Imre Tóth; László Tóth; Balázs Vincze
1994 Rome	Italy^{*} Francesco Attolico; Gianni Averaimo; Alessandro Bovo; Roberto Calcaterra; Alessandro Campagna; Marco D'Altrui; Massimiliano Ferretti; Mario Fiorillo; Ferdinando Gandolfi; Amedeo Pomilio; Francesco Porzio; Pino Porzio; Carlo Silipo	Spain; Daniel Ballart; Manuel Estiarte; Pedro García; Salvador Gómez; Gabriel Hernández; Gustavo Marcos; Miki Oca; Jorge Payá; Sergi Pedrerol; Josep Picó; Jesús Rollán; Jordi Sans; Manuel Silvestre	Russia; Dmitry Apanasenko; Maxim Apanasenko; Dmitri Dugin; Sergey Garbuzov; Dmitry Gorshkov; Sergey Ivlev; Nikolay Kozlov; Nikolay Maksimov; Serghei Marcoci; Aleksandr Ogorodnikov; Yuriy Smoloviy; Aleksandr Yeryshov; Sergey Yevstigneyev
1998 Perth	Spain; Daniel Ballart; Manuel Estiarte; Pedro García; Salvador Gómez; Miguel González; Gustavo Marcos; Rubén Michavila; Iván Moro; Sergi Pedrerol; Iván Pérez; Jesús Rollán; Jordi Sans; Carles Sanz	Hungary; Tibor Benedek; Rajmund Fodor; Tamás Kásás; Gergely Kiss; Zoltán Kósz; Zoltán Kovács; Tamás Märcz; Tamás Molnár; Barnabás Steinmetz; Frank Tóth; Zsolt Varga; Attila Vári; Balázs Vincze	Yugoslavia^{†} (Note: After the breakup of Yugoslavia, FR Yugoslavia men's national water polo team participated at the 1998 and 2001 World Aquatics Championships. In 2003, after the country was renamed from FR Yugoslavia to Serbia and Montenegro, the team was also renamed to "Serbia and Montenegro men's national water polo team".); Aleksandar Ćirić; Danilo Ikodinović; Dragan Jovanović; Nikola Kuljača; Aleksandar Nikolić; Dušan Popović; Aleksandar Šapić; Dejan Savić; Petar Trbojević; Veljko Uskoković; Željko Vičević; Vladimir Vujasinović; Nenad Vukanić
2001 Fukuoka	Spain; Ángel Andreo; Daniel Ballart; Salvador Gómez; Gabriel Hernández; Gustavo Marcos; Guillermo Molina; Daniel Moro; Iván Moro; Sergi Pedrerol; Iván Pérez; Jesús Rollán; Javier Sánchez; Carles Sanz	Yugoslavia^{†} Aleksandar Ćirić; Danilo Ikodinović; Viktor Jelenić; Branko Peković; Aleksandar Šapić; Dejan Savić; Denis Šefik; Aleksandar Šoštar; Petar Trbojević; Veljko Uskoković; Vladimir Vujasinović; Nenad Vukanić; Predrag Zimonjić	Russia; Roman Balashov; Revaz Chomakhidze; Aleksandr Fyodorov; Sergey Garbuzov; Dmitry Gorshkov; Nikolay Kozlov; Alexey Panfili; Andrei Rekechinski; Ilya Smirnov; Yuri Yatsev; Aleksandr Yeryshov; Marat Zakirov; Irek Zinnurov
2003 Barcelona	Hungary; Tibor Benedek; Péter Biros; Rajmund Fodor; István Gergely; Tamás Kásás; Gergely Kiss; Norbert Madaras; Tamás Molnár; Barnabás Steinmetz; Zoltán Szécsi; Tamás Varga; Zsolt Varga; Attila Vári	Italy; Alberto Angelini; Fabio Bencivenga; Fabrizio Buonocore; Alessandro Calcaterra; Roberto Calcaterra; Maurizio Felugo; Goran Fiorentini; Marco Gerini; Andrea Mangiante; Francesco Postiglione; Bogdan Rath; Carlo Silipo; Stefano Tempesti	Serbia and Montenegro^{†} Aleksandar Ćirić; Vladimir Gojković; Danilo Ikodinović; Viktor Jelenić; Predrag Jokić; Nikola Kuljača; Slobodan Nikić; Aleksandar Šapić; Dejan Savić; Denis Šefik; Vanja Udovičić; Vladimir Vujasinović; Boris Zloković
2005 Montreal	Serbia and Montenegro^{†} Vladimir Gojković; Danilo Ikodinović; Nikola Janović; Predrag Jokić; Slobodan Nikić; Zdravko Radić; Aleksandar Šapić; Dejan Savić; Denis Šefik; Petar Trbojević; Vanja Udovičić; Vladimir Vujasinović; Boris Zloković	Hungary; Péter Biros; Rajmund Fodor; István Gergely; Tamás Kásás; Csaba Kiss; Gergely Kiss; Norbert Madaras; Tamás Molnár; Ádám Steinmetz; Zoltán Szécsi; Márton Szívós; Dániel Varga; Attila Vári	Greece; Christos Afroudakis; Georgios Afroudakis; Theodoros Chatzitheodorou; Nikolaos Deligiannis; Dimitrios Mazis; Emmanouil Mylonakis; Georgios Ntoskas; Georgios Reppas; Stefanos Santa; Anastasios Schizas; Argyris Theodoropoulos; Antonios Vlontakis; Manthos Voulgarakis
2007 Melbourne	Croatia; Samir Barać; Miho Bošković; Damir Burić; Andro Bušlje; Teo Đogaš; Igor Hinić; Maro Joković; Aljoša Kunac; Pavo Marković; Josip Pavić; Mile Smodlaka; Frano Vićan; Zdeslav Vrdoljak	Hungary; Tibor Benedek; Péter Biros; Rajmund Fodor; Tamás Kásás; Gábor Kis; Gergely Kiss; Norbert Madaras; Tamás Molnár; Viktor Nagy; Zoltán Szécsi; Márton Szívós; Dániel Varga; Dénes Varga	Spain; Iñaki Aguilar; Ángel Andreo; Iván Gallego; Mario José García; Xavier García; David Martín; Marc Minguell; Guillermo Molina; Iván Pérez; Felipe Perrone; Ricardo Perrone; Svilen Piralkov; Xavier Vallès
2009 Rome	Serbia; Milan Aleksić; Marko Avramović; Filip Filipović; Slavko Gak; Živko Gocić; Stefan Mitrović; Slobodan Nikić; Duško Pijetlović; Gojko Pijetlović; Andrija Prlainović; Nikola Rađen; Slobodan Soro; Vanja Udovičić	Spain; Iñaki Aguilar; Albert Español; Iván Gallego; Mario José García; Xavier García; Daniel López; Blai Mallarach; David Martín; Marc Minguell; Guillermo Molina; Iván Pérez; Felipe Perrone; Xavier Vallès	Croatia; Srđan Antonijević; Samir Barać; Miho Bošković; Ivo Brzica; Ivan Buljubašić; Damir Burić; Andro Bušlje; Nikša Dobud; Igor Hinić; Frano Karač; Paulo Obradović; Josip Pavić; Sandro Sukno
2011 Shanghai	Italy; Matteo Aicardi; Arnaldo Deserti; Maurizio Felugo; Niccolò Figari; Pietro Figlioli; Deni Fiorentini; Valentino Gallo; Alex Giorgetti; Niccolò Gitto; Giacomo Pastorino; Amaurys Pérez; Christian Presciutti; Stefano Tempesti	Serbia; Milan Aleksić; Marko Avramović; Miloš Ćuk; Filip Filipović; Živko Gocić; Stefan Mitrović; Slobodan Nikić; Duško Pijetlović; Gojko Pijetlović; Andrija Prlainović; Nikola Rađen; Slobodan Soro; Vanja Udovičić	Croatia; Samir Barać; Miho Bošković; Ivan Buljubašić; Damir Burić; Andro Bušlje; Nikša Dobud; Maro Joković; Frano Karač; Petar Muslim; Paulo Obradović; Fran Paškvalin; Josip Pavić; Sandro Sukno
2013 Barcelona	Hungary; Bence Bátori; Krisztián Bedő; Ádám Decker; Attila Decker; Miklós Gór-Nagy; Balázs Hárai; Norbert Hosnyánszky; Norbert Madaras; Viktor Nagy; Márton Szívós; Márton Vámos; Dániel Varga; Dénes Varga	Montenegro; Darko Brguljan; Draško Brguljan; Ugo Crousillat; Aleksandar Ivović; Mlađan Janović; Nikola Janović; Predrag Jokić; Filip Klikovać; Saša Mišić; Vjekoslav Pasković; Antonio Petrović; Zdravko Radić; Miloš Šćepanović	Croatia; Marko Bijač; Luka Bukić; Andro Bušlje; Nikša Dobud; Maro Joković; Luka Lončar; Ivan Milaković; Petar Muslim; Paulo Obradović; Fran Paškvalin; Josip Pavić; Anđelo Šetka; Sandro Sukno
2015 Kazan	Serbia; Milan Aleksić; Miloš Ćuk; Filip Filipović; Živko Gocić; Nikola Jakšić; Dušan Mandić; Branislav Mitrović; Stefan Mitrović; Slobodan Nikić; Duško Pijetlović; Gojko Pijetlović; Andrija Prlainović; Sava Ranđelović	Croatia; Marko Bijač; Luka Bukić; Damir Burić; Andro Bušlje; Maro Joković; Luka Lončar; Petar Muslim; Paulo Obradović; Fran Paškvalin; Josip Pavić; Antonio Petković; Anđelo Šetka; Sandro Sukno	Greece; Christos Afroudakis; Evangelos Delakas; Georgios Dervisis; Konstantinos Flegkas; Ioannis Fountoulis; Stefanos Galanopoulos; Konstantinos Genidounias; Alexandros Gounas; Christodoulos Kolomvos; Konstantinos Mourikis; Emmanouil Mylonakis; Kyriakos Pontikeas; Angelos Vlachopoulos
2017 Budapest	Croatia; Marko Bijač; Ivan Buljubašić; Andro Bušlje; Loren Fatović; Xavier García; Maro Joković; Ivan Krapić; Luka Lončar; Marko Macan; Ivan Marcelić; Anđelo Šetka; Sandro Sukno; Ante Vukičević	Hungary^{*} Ádám Decker; Attila Decker; Balázs Erdélyi; Miklós Gór-Nagy; Balázs Hárai; Norbert Hosnyánszky; Krisztián Manhercz; Tamás Mezei; Viktor Nagy; Béla Török; Márton Vámos; Dénes Varga; Gergő Zalánki	Serbia; Milan Aleksić; Miloš Ćuk; Filip Filipović; Nikola Jakšić; Dušan Mandić; Branislav Mitrović; Stefan Mitrović; Duško Pijetlović; Gojko Pijetlović; Andrija Prlainović; Sava Ranđelović; Viktor Rašović; Nemanja Ubović
2019 Gwangju	Italy; Matteo Aicardi; Michaël Bodegas; Marco Del Lungo; Francesco Di Fulvio; Edoardo Di Somma; Vincenzo Dolce; Gonzalo Echenique; Niccolò Figari; Pietro Figlioli; Stefano Luongo; Gianmarco Nicosia; Vincenzo Renzuto; Alessandro Velotto	Spain; Alberto Barroso; Alejandro Bustos; Sergi Cabañas; Miguel de Toro; Francisco Fernández; Álvaro Granados; Marc Larumbe; Daniel López; Eduardo Lorrio; Blai Mallarach; Alberto Munárriz; Felipe Perrone; Roger Tahull	Croatia; Hrvoje Benić; Marko Bijač; Andro Bušlje; Loren Fatović; Xavier García; Maro Joković; Luka Lončar; Marko Macan; Ivan Marcelić; Lovre Miloš; Anđelo Šetka; Josip Vrlić; Ante Vukičević
2022 Budapest	Spain; Unai Aguirre; Alejandro Bustos; Sergi Cabañas; Miguel de Toro; Martin Famera; Álvaro Granados; Marc Larumbe; Eduardo Lorrio; Blai Mallarach; Alberto Munárriz; Felipe Perrone; Bernat Sanahuja; Roger Tahull	Italy; Lorenzo Bruni; Giacomo Cannella; Luca Damonte; Marco Del Lungo; Francesco Di Fulvio; Edoardo Di Somma; Vincenzo Dolce; Gonzalo Echenique; Andrea Fondelli; Matteo Iocchi Gratta; Luca Marziali; Gianmarco Nicosia; Nicholas Presciutti	Greece; Stylianos Argyropoulos; Georgios Dervisis; Ioannis Fountoulis; Konstantinos Genidounias; Konstantinos Gouvis; Konstantinos Kakaris; Efstathios Kalogeropoulos; Dimitrios Nikolaidis; Alexandros Papanastasiou; Dimitrios Skoumpakis; Panagiotis Tzortzatos; Angelos Vlachopoulos; Emmanouil Zerdevas
2023 Fukuoka	Hungary; Dániel Angyal; Gergő Fekete; Szilárd Jansik; Márton Lévai; Krisztián Manhercz; Erik Molnár; Ádám Nagy; Toni Német; Zoltán Pohl; Márton Vámos; Dénes Varga; Vendel Vigvári; Vince Vigvári; Soma Vogel; Gergő Zalánki	Greece; Ioannis Alafragkis; Stylianos Argyropoulos; Aristeidis Chalyvopoulos; Georgios Dervisis; Ioannis Fountoulis; Konstantinos Genidounias; Nikolaos Gkillas; Konstantinos Gkiouvetsis; Konstantinos Kakaris; Efstathios Kalogeropoulos; Dimitrios Nikolaidis; Alexandros Papanastasiou; Dimitrios Skoumpakis; Panagiotis Tzortzatos; Emmanouil Zerdevas	Spain; Unai Aguirre; Alberto Barroso; Alejandro Bustos; Sergi Cabañas; Miguel de Toro; Martin Famera; Álvaro Granados; Marc Larumbe; Eduardo Lorrio; Blai Mallarach; Alberto Munárriz; Felipe Perrone; Bernat Sanahuja; Roger Tahull; Fran Valera
2024 Doha	Croatia; Mate Anić; Marko Bijač; Matias Biljaka; Rino Burić; Zvonimir Butić; Loren Fatović; Konstantin Kharkov; Ivan Krapić; Filip Kržić; Franko Lazić; Luka Lončar; Jerko Marinić Kragić; Josip Vrlić; Ante Vukičević; Marko Žuvela	Italy; Lorenzo Bruni; Giacomo Cannella; Francesco Condemi; Luca Damonte; Marco Del Lungo; Francesco Di Fulvio; Edoardo Di Somma; Gonzalo Echenique; Andrea Fondelli; Matteo Iocchi Gratta; Luca Marziali; Gianmarco Nicosia; Nicholas Presciutti; Vincenzo Renzuto; Alessandro Velotto	Spain; Unai Aguirre; Unai Biel; Alejandro Bustos; Sergi Cabañas; Miguel de Toro; Martin Famera; Álvaro Granados; Marc Larumbe; Eduardo Lorrio; Blai Mallarach; Alberto Munárriz; Felipe Perrone; Bernat Sanahuja; Roger Tahull; Fran Valera
2025 Singapore	Spain; Unai Aguirre; Unai Biel; Alejandro Bustos; Javier Bustos; Sergi Cabañas; Miguel de Toro; Biel Gomila; Álvaro Granados; Marc Larumbe; Eduardo Lorrio; Alberto Munárriz; Felipe Perrone; Bernat Sanahuja; Roger Tahull; Fran Valera	Hungary; Dániel Angyal; Gergely Burián; Kristóf Csoma; Gergő Fekete; Szilárd Jansik; Péter Kovács; Krisztián Manhercz; Márton Mizsei; Erik Molnár; Ádám Nagy; Ákos Nagy; Márton Vámos; Vendel Vigvári; Vince Vigvári; Zsombor Vismeg	Greece; Ioannis Alafragkis; Emmanouil Andreadis; Stylianos Argyropoulos; Aristeidis Chalyvopoulos; Nikolaos Gardikas; Konstantinos Genidounias; Nikolaos Gkillas; Konstantinos Gkiouvetsis; Konstantinos Kakaris; Efstathios Kalogeropoulos; Dimitrios Nikolaidis; Nikolaos Papanikolaou; Evangelos Pouros; Dimitrios Skoumpakis; Panagiotis Tzortzatos

=== Multiple gold medalists ===
The following table is pre-sorted by number of gold medals (in descending order), number of silver medals (in descending order), number of bronze medals (in descending order), date of receiving the last gold medal (in ascending order), date of receiving the first gold medal (in ascending order), name of the player (in ascending order), respectively.

Serbian player Slobodan Nikić is the first and only male athlete to win three gold medals in water polo at the World Aquatics Championships.

There are forty six male athletes who won two gold medals in water polo at the World Aquatics Championships.

Legend

- – Hosts

Male athletes who won three or more gold medals in water polo at the World Aquatics Championships
Rk	Player	Birth	Height	Men's team	Pos	Water polo tournament							Period (age of first/last)	Medals				Ref
Rk	Player	Birth	Height	Men's team	Pos	Water polo tournament							Period (age of first/last)	G	S	B	T	Ref
1	Slobodan Nikić	1983	1.97 m (6 ft 6 in)	Serbia and Montenegro	FP	2003	2005						12 years (20/32)	3	1	1	5	
1	Slobodan Nikić	1983	1.97 m (6 ft 6 in)	Serbia	FP			2007	2009	2011	2013	2015	12 years (20/32)	3	1	1	5	

=== Multiple medalists ===
The following table is pre-sorted by total number of medals (in descending order), number of gold medals (in descending order), number of silver medals (in descending order), date of receiving the last medal (in ascending order), date of receiving the first medal (in ascending order), name of the player (in ascending order), respectively.

Seventeen male athletes won five or more medals in water polo at the World Aquatics Championships. Aside from Serbian player Slobodan Nikić, all others were members of the Spain men's national water polo team (10 players) and Croatia men's national water polo team (6 players). Brazilian-born Spanish player Felipe Perrone and Croatian Andro Bušlje are the only athletes (man or woman) to win seven medals in water polo at the World Aquatics Championships.

Legend

- – Hosts

Male athletes who won five or more medals in water polo at the World Aquatics Championships
Rk	Player	Birth	Height	Men's team	Pos	Water polo tournament														Period (age of first/last)	Medals				Ref
Rk	Player	Birth	Height	Men's team	Pos	Water polo tournament														Period (age of first/last)	G	S	B	T	Ref
1	Felipe Perrone	1986	1.83 m (6 ft 0 in)	Spain	FP			2005	2007	2009	2011	2013			2019	2022	2023	2024	2025	24 years (15/39)	2	2	3	7	
1	Felipe Perrone	1986	1.83 m (6 ft 0 in)	Brazil	FP	2001	2003						2015							24 years (15/39)	2	2	3	7	
2	Andro Bušlje	1986	2.00 m (6 ft 7 in)	Croatia	FP	2005	2007	2009	2011	2013	2015	2017	2019							14 years (19/33)	2	1	4	7	
3	Maro Joković	1987	2.03 m (6 ft 8 in)	Croatia	FP	2007		2011	2013	2015	2017	2019								12 years (19/31)	2	1	3	6	
4	Slobodan Nikić	1983	1.97 m (6 ft 6 in)	Serbia and Montenegro	FP	2003	2005													12 years (20/32)	3	1	1	5	
4	Slobodan Nikić	1983	1.97 m (6 ft 6 in)	Serbia	FP			2007	2009	2011	2013	2015								12 years (20/32)	3	1	1	5	
5	Marko Bijač	1991	2.01 m (6 ft 7 in)	Croatia	GK	2013	2015	2017	2019	2022	2023	2024	2025							12 years (22/34)	2	1	2	5	
5	Alejandro Bustos	1997	1.93 m (6 ft 4 in)	Spain	FP	2017	2019	2022	2023	2024	2025									8 years (20/28)	2	1	2	5	
5	Sergi Cabañas	1996	1.91 m (6 ft 3 in)	Spain	FP	2019	2022	2023	2024	2025										6 years (23/29)	2	1	2	5	
5	Miguel de Toro	1993	2.02 m (6 ft 8 in)	Spain	FP	2017	2019	2022	2023	2024	2025									8 years (23/31)	2	1	2	5	
5	Álvaro Granados	1998	1.92 m (6 ft 4 in)	Spain	FP	2017	2019	2022	2023	2024	2025									8 years (18/26)	2	1	2	5	
5	Marc Larumbe	1994	1.93 m (6 ft 4 in)	Spain	FP	2019	2022	2023	2024	2025										6 years (25/31)	2	1	2	5	
5	Luka Lončar	1987	1.95 m (6 ft 5 in)	Croatia	FP	2013	2015	2017	2019			2024	2025							12 years (26/38)	2	1	2	5	
5	Eduardo Lorrio	1993	1.93 m (6 ft 4 in)	Spain	GK	2019	2022	2023	2024	2025										6 years (25/31)	2	1	2	5	
5	Alberto Munárriz	1994	1.95 m (6 ft 5 in)	Spain	FP	2013		2017	2019	2022	2023	2024	2025							12 years (19/31)	2	1	2	5	
5	Roger Tahull	1997	1.95 m (6 ft 5 in)	Spain	FP	2017	2019	2022	2023	2024	2025									8 years (20/28)	2	1	2	5	
15	Blai Mallarach	1987	1.87 m (6 ft 2 in)	Spain	FP	2009					2019	2022	2023	2024						15 years (21/36)	1	2	2	5	
16	Josip Pavić	1982	1.95 m (6 ft 5 in)	Croatia	GK	2001		2005	2007	2009	2011	2013	2015							14 years (19/33)	1	1	3	5	
16	Sandro Sukno	1990	2.00 m (6 ft 7 in)	Croatia	FP	2009	2011	2013	2015	2017										8 years (19/27)	1	1	3	5	
Rk	Player	Birth	Height	Men's team	Pos	Water polo tournament														Period (age of first/last)	G	S	B	T	Ref
Rk	Player	Birth	Height	Men's team	Pos	Water polo tournament														Period (age of first/last)	Medals				Ref

== Women ==
=== Medalists by tournament ===
Abbreviation and legend

- ^{*} – Host team

Games	Gold	Silver	Bronze
1986 Madrid	Australia; Judy Gair; Debbie Handley; Amanda Leeson; Katie McAdams; Megan Meloncelli; Wendy Meloncelli; Sandy Mills-O'Melia; Lynne Morrison; Jackie Northam; Cathy Parkers; Janet Rayner; Julie Sheperd; Debbie Watson	Netherlands; Anita Bibo; Hellen Boering; Janet Heijnert; Monique Kranenburg; Alice Lindhout; Patricia Megens; Ineke Pesman; Janny Spijker; Lieneke van den Heuvel; Marjo van der Mark; Greet van der Veen; Madeline van Heemstra; Hedda Verdam	United States; Theresa Breckon; Lynn Comer; Yolanda Gascon; Dion Gray; Vaune Kadlubek; Marybeth Kolding; Simone LaPay; Laura Laughlin; Maureen O'Toole; Marla Smith; Jill Sterkel; Lyn Taylor; Lynn Wittstock
1991 Perth	Netherlands; Hellen Boering; Irma Brander; Edmée Hiemstra; Monique Kranenburg; Karin Kuipers; Patricia Libregts; Alice Lindhout; Marjan op den Velde; Lilian Ossendrijver; Janny Spijker; Esmeralda van den Water; Karla van der Boon; Hedda Verdam	Canada; Isabelle Auger; Caroline Boisclair; Nathalie Deschênes; Marie-Claude Deslières; Pascale Deslières; Sabine Difilippo; Karen Gibson; Heather Kaulbach; Roxane Lafrance; Chantal Larocque; Karen Morrisson; Heather Smith; Marilyn Thorington	United States; Erika Billish; Kelli Billish; Theresa Breckon; Nancy Corstorhine; Amber Drury; Megan Hernandez; Jenny Hodge; Maggi Kelly; Margo Miranda; Maureen O'Toole-Mendoza; Sandy Vessey; Jocelyn Wilkie; Lynn Wittstock
1994 Rome	Hungary; Katalin Dancsa; Zsuzsa Dunkel; Andrea Eke; Zsuzsanna Hulf; Ildikó Kuna; Irén Rafael; Katalin Rédei; Edit Sipos; Mercédesz Stieber; Orsolya Szalkay; Krisztina Szremkó; Gabriella Tóth; Noémi Tóth	Netherlands; Ellen Bast; Hellen Boering; Edmée Hiemstra; Stella Kriekaard; Karin Kuipers; Ingrid Leijendekker; Alice Lindhout; Sandra Scherrenburg; Rianne Schram; Janny Spijker; Gillian van den Berg; Karla van der Boon; Hedda Verdam	Italy^{*} Nicoletta Abbate; Carmela Allucci; Cristina Consoli; Francesca Conti; Antonella Di Giacinto; Oriana Di Siena; Melania Grego; Stefania Lariucci; Giusi Malato; Martina Miceli; Paola Sabbatini; Monica Vaillant; Milena Virzì
1998 Perth	Italy; Carmela Allucci; Alexandra Araújo; Cristina Consoli; Francesca Conti; Antonella Di Giacinto; Eleonora Gay; Melania Grego; Stefania Larucci; Giusi Malato; Martina Miceli; Maddalena Musumeci; Monica Vaillant; Milena Virzi	Netherlands; Ellen Bast; Daniëlle de Bruijn; Edmée Hiemstra; Karin Kuipers; Ingrid Leijendekker; Petra Meerdink; Marjan op den Velde; Carla Quint; Sandra Scherrenburg; Mariëlle Schothans; Gillian van den Berg; Karla van der Boon; Carla van Usen	Australia^{*} Naomi Castle; Simone Dixon; Kylie English; Bridgette Gusterson; Yvette Higgins; Bronwyn Mayer; Melissa Mills; Stephanie Neesham; Marian Taylor; Liz Weekes; Sharan Wheelock; Danielle Woodhouse; Taryn Woods
2001 Fukuoka	Italy; Carmela Allucci; Alexandra Araújo; Silvia Bosurgi; Cristina Consoli; Francesca Conti; Tania Di Mario; Melania Grego; Giusi Malato; Martina Miceli; Maddalena Musumeci; Paola Sabbatini; Gabriella Sciolti; Monica Vaillant	Hungary; Katalin Dancsa; Rita Drávucz; Anikó Pelle; Ágnes Primász; Katalin Rédei; Edit Sipos; Ildikó Sós; Mercédesz Stieber; Brigitta Szép; Krisztina Szremkó; Zsuzsanna Tiba; Ágnes Valkai; Erzsébet Valkai	Canada; Marie Luc Arpin; Johanne Bégin; Cora Campbell; Melissa Collins; Andrea Dewar; Valérie Dionne; Ann Dow; Susan Gardiner; Waneek Horn-Miller; Whynter Lamarre; Sandra Lizé; Josée Marsolais; Jana Salat
2003 Barcelona	United States; Robin Beauregard; Margaret Dingeldein; Gabrielle Domanic; Ellen Estes; Jacqueline Frank; Natalie Golda; Ericka Lorenz; Heather Moody; Thalia Munro; Nicolle Payne; Heather Petri; Amber Stachowski; Brenda Villa	Italy; Carmela Allucci; Alexandra Araújo; Silvia Bosurgi; Francesca Conti; Tania Di Mario; Melania Grego; Erika Lava; Giusi Malato; Martina Miceli; Maddalena Musumeci; Cinzia Ragusa; Noémi Tóth; Emanuela Zanchi	Russia; Svetlana Bogdanova; Sofia Konukh; Veronika Linkova; Tatiana Petrova; Ekaterina Salimova; Natalia Shepelina; Ekaterina Shishova; Elena Smurova; Olga Turova; Valentina Vorontsova; Maria Yaina; Galina Zlotnikova; Anastasia Zubkova
2005 Montreal	Hungary; Tímea Benkő; Fruzsina Brávik; Rita Drávucz; Patrícia Horváth; Dóra Kisteleki; Anikó Pelle; Krisztina Serfőző; Mercédesz Stieber; Orsolya Takács; Eszter Tomaskovics; Andrea Tóth; Ágnes Valkai; Krisztina Zantleitner	United States; Emily Feher; Erika Figge; Natalie Golda; Jaime Hipp; Kristina Kunkel; Ericka Lorenz; Thalia Munro; Heather Petri; Kelly Rulon; Moriah van Norman; Brenda Villa; Drue Wawrzynski; Lauren Wenger	Canada^{*} Krystina Alogbo; Marie Luc Arpin; Johanne Bégin; Cora Campbell; Tara Campbell; Valérie Dionne; Ann Dow; Susan Gardiner; Whynter Lamarre; Dominique Perreault; Rachel Riddell; Christine Robinson; Jana Salat
2007 Melbourne	United States; Elizabeth Armstrong; Patty Cardenas; Kami Craig; Natalie Golda; Alison Gregorka; Brittany Hayes; Jaime Hipp; Ericka Lorenz; Heather Petri; Moriah van Norman; Brenda Villa; Lauren Wenger; Elsie Windes	Australia^{*} Gemma Beadsworth; Nikita Cuffe; Suzie Fraser; Taniele Gofers; Kate Gynther; Gemma Hadley; Amy Hetzel; Bronwen Knox; Emma Knox; Alicia McCormack; Melissa Rippon; Rebecca Rippon; Mia Santoromito	Russia; Olga Fomicheva; Nadezhda Glyzina; Sofia Konukh; Maria Kovtunovskaya; Ekaterina Pantyulina; Natalia Ryzhova-Alenicheva; Natalia Shepelina; Elena Smurova; Evgenia Soboleva; Valentina Vorontsova; Alena Vylegzhanina; Ekaterina Zubacheva; Anastasia Zubkova
2009 Rome	United States; Elizabeth Armstrong; Kami Craig; Tanya Gandy; Alison Gregorka; Brittany Hayes; Jaime Komer; Heather Petri; Kelly Rulon; Jessica Steffens; Moriah van Norman; Brenda Villa; Lauren Wenger; Elsie Windes	Canada; Krystina Alogbo; Joëlle Békhazi; Tara Campbell; Emily Csikos; Carmen Eggens; Whitney Genoway; Marissa Janssens; Katrina Monton; Dominique Perreault; Marina Radu; Rachel Riddell; Christine Robinson; Rosanna Tomiuk	Russia; Olga Beliaeva; Yulia Gaufler; Nadezhda Glyzina; Evgeniya Ivanova; Sofia Konukh; Maria Kovtunovskaya; Ekaterina Pantyulina; Ekaterina Prokofyeva; Yevgeniya Protsenko; Natalia Ryzhova-Alenicheva; Evgenia Soboleva; Anna Timofeeva; Alena Vylegzhanina
2011 Shanghai	Greece; Stavroula Antonakou; Alexandra Asimaki; Alkisti Avramidou; Angeliki Gerolymou; Eleni Goula; Eleni Kouvdou; Georgia Lara; Kyriaki Liosi; Triantafyllia Manolioudaki; Antiopi Melidoni; Ilektra Psouni; Antigoni Roumpesi; Christina Tsoukala	China^{*} Chen Yuan; He Jin; Liu Ping; Ma Huanhuan; Song Donglun; Sun Huizi; Sun Yating; Sun Yujun; Teng Fei; Wang Yi; Wang Ying; Yang Jun; Zhang Lei	Russia; Alexandra Antonova; Olga Beliaeva; Nadezhda Fedotova; Yulia Gaufler; Evgeniya Ivanova; Anna Karnaukh; Sofia Konukh; Maria Kovtunovskaya; Ekaterina Lisunova; Ekaterina Prokofyeva; Natalia Ryzhova-Alenicheva; Evgenia Soboleva; Ekaterina Tankeeva
2013 Barcelona	Spain^{*} Marta Bach; Andrea Blas; Anni Espar; Laura Ester; Maica García; Patricia Herrera; Laura López; Ona Meseguer; Lorena Miranda; Matilde Ortiz; Jennifer Pareja; Pilar Peña; Roser Tarragó	Australia; Jayde Appel; Zoe Arancini; Lea Barta; Isobel Bishop; Hannah Buckling; Keesja Gofers; Bronwen Knox; Holly Lincoln-Smith; Glencora McGhie; Ashleigh Southern; Kelsey Wakefield; Rowena Webster; Nicola Zagame	Hungary; Dóra Antal; Flóra Bolonyai; Barbara Bujka; Krisztina Garda; Anna Illés; Orsolya Kasó; Rita Keszthelyi; Dóra Kisteleki; Katalin Menczinger; Ibolya Kitti Miskolczi; Gabriella Szűcs; Orsolya Takács; Ildikó Tóth
2015 Kazan	United States; Kami Craig; Rachel Fattal; Makenzie Fischer; Kaleigh Gilchrist; Ashley Grossman; Samantha Hill; Ashleigh Johnson; Courtney Mathewson; Maddie Musselman; Kiley Neushul; Melissa Seidemann; Maggie Steffens; Alys Williams	Netherlands; Laura Aarts; Amarens Genee; Dagmar Genee; Lieke Klaassen; Maud Megens; Marloes Nijhuis; Vivian Sevenich; Yasemin Smit; Nomi Stomphorst; Leonie van der Molen; Sabrina van der Sloot; Isabella van Toorn; Debby Willemsz	Italy; Rosaria Aiello; Laura Barzon; Roberta Bianconi; Tania Di Mario; Giulia Emmolo; Teresa Frassinetti; Arianna Garibotti; Giulia Gorlero; Francesca Pomeri; Elisa Queirolo; Federica Radicchi; Chiara Tabani; Laura Teani
2017 Budapest	United States; Rachel Fattal; Aria Fischer; Makenzie Fischer; Paige Hauschild; Amanda Longan; Maddie Musselman; Jamie Neushul; Kiley Neushul; Jordan Raney; Melissa Seidemann; Maggie Steffens; Gabrielle Stone; Alys Williams	Spain; Marta Bach; Paula Crespí; Sandra Domene; Anni Espar; Clara Espar; Laura Ester; Judith Forca; Anna Gual; Paula Leitón; Helena Lloret; Beatriz Ortiz; Matilde Ortiz; Pilar Peña	Russia; Maria Borisova; Olga Gorbunova; Evgeniya Ivanova; Elvina Karimova; Anna Karnaukh; Ekaterina Prokofyeva; Daria Ryzhkova; Alena Serzhantova; Anastasia Simanovich; Anna Timofeeva; Tatiana Tolkunova; Anna Ustyukhina; Veronika Vakhitova
2019 Gwangju	United States; Rachel Fattal; Aria Fischer; Makenzie Fischer; Kaleigh Gilchrist; Stephania Haralabidis; Paige Hauschild; Ashleigh Johnson; Amanda Longan; Maddie Musselman; Kiley Neushul; Melissa Seidemann; Maggie Steffens; Alys Williams	Spain; Marta Bach; Paula Crespí; Anni Espar; Clara Espar; Laura Ester; Judith Forca; Maica García; Irene González; Paula Leitón; Beatriz Ortiz; Pilar Peña; Elena Sánchez; Roser Tarragó	Australia; Zoe Arancini; Elle Armit; Isobel Bishop; Hannah Buckling; Keesja Gofers; Bronte Halligan; Bronwen Knox; Lena Mihailovic; Gabriella Palm; Amy Ridge; Madeleine Steere; Rowena Webster; Lea Yanitsas
2022 Budapest	United States; Rachel Fattal; Kaleigh Gilchrist; Stephania Haralabidis; Ashleigh Johnson; Ava Johnson; Amanda Longan; Denise Mammolito; Maddie Musselman; Ryann Neushul; Tara Prentice; Jordan Raney; Maggie Steffens; Bayley Weber	Hungary^{*} Kamilla Faragó; Edina Gangl; Krisztina Garda; Gréta Gurisatti; Rita Keszthelyi; Dóra Leimeter; Alda Magyari; Geraldine Mahieu; Zsuzsanna Máté; Rebecca Parkes; Natasa Rybanska; Dorottya Szilágyi; Vanda Vályi	Netherlands; Laura Aarts; Sarah Buis; Kitty-Lynn Joustra; Ilse Koolhaas; Lola Moolhuijzen; Bente Rogge; Maxine Schaap; Vivian Sevenich; Brigitte Sleeking; Nina ten Broek; Simone van de Kraats; Sabrina van der Sloot; Rozanne Voorvelt; Iris Wolves
2023 Fukuoka	Netherlands; Laura Aarts; Sarah Buis; Kitty-Lynn Joustra; Maartje Keuning; Lola Moolhuijzen; Bente Rogge; Lieke Rogge; Maxine Schaap; Vivian Sevenich; Brigitte Sleeking; Nina ten Broek; Simone van de Kraats; Sabrina van der Sloot; Marit van der Weijden; Iris Wolves	Spain; Paula Camus; Paula Crespí; Anni Espar; Laura Ester; Judith Forca; Maica García; Paula Leitón; Cristina Nogué; Beatriz Ortiz; Pilar Peña; Nona Pérez; Ariadna Ruiz; Elena Ruiz; Martina Terré	Italy; Silvia Avegno; Caterina Banchelli; Dafne Bettini; Roberta Bianconi; Lucrezia Cergol; Agnese Cocchiere; Giuseppina Condorelli; Giuditta Galardi; Veronica Gant; Sofia Giustini; Claudia Marletta; Valeria Palmieri; Domitilla Picozzi; Chiara Tabani; Giulia Viacava
2024 Doha	United States; Emily Ausmus; Rachel Fattal; Jenna Flynn; Kaleigh Gilchrist; Ashleigh Johnson; Amanda Longan; Denise Mammolito; Maddie Musselman; Ryann Neushul; Tara Prentice; Jordan Raney; Jewel Roemer; Jovana Sekulic; Maggie Steffens; Bayley Weber	Hungary; Kamilla Faragó; Krisztina Garda; Gréta Gurisatti; Brigitta Horváth; Rita Keszthelyi; Szonja Kuna; Dóra Leimeter; Alda Magyari; Geraldine Mahieu; Zsuzsanna Máté; Boglárka Neszmély; Rebecca Parkes; Natasa Rybanska; Dorottya Szilágyi; Vanda Vályi	Spain; Paula Camus; Paula Crespí; Anni Espar; Laura Ester; Judith Forca; Maica García; Paula Leitón; Cristina Nogué; Beatriz Ortiz; Pilar Peña; Nona Pérez; Isabel Piralkova; Ariadna Ruiz; Elena Ruiz; Martina Terré
2025 Singapore	Greece; Athina Giannopoulou; Dionysia Koureta; Nefeli Anna Krassa; Maria Myriokefalitaki; Eirini Ninou; Maria Patra; Eleftheria Plevritou; Vasiliki Plevritou; Stefania Santa; Christina Siouti; Ioanna Stamatopoulou; Sofia Tornarou; Foteini Tricha; Alexia Evgenia Tzourka; Eleni Xenaki	Hungary; Dalma Dömsödi; Kamilla Faragó; Krisztina Garda; Kata Hajdú; Rita Keszthelyi; Dóra Leimeter; Boglárka Neszmély; Kinga Peresztegi-Nagy; Natasa Rybanska; Nóra Sümegi; Dorottya Szilágyi; Panna Tiba; Luca Torma; Vanda Vályi; Eszter Varró	Spain; Paula Camus; Paula Crespí; Anni Espar; Irene González; Paula Leitón; Daniela Moreno; Beatriz Ortiz; Carlota Peñalver; Nona Pérez; Paula Prats; Ariadna Ruiz; Elena Ruiz; Mariona Terré; Martina Terré

=== Multiple gold medalists ===
The following table is pre-sorted by number of gold medals (in descending order), number of silver medals (in descending order), number of bronze medals (in descending order), name of the player (in ascending order), date of receiving the last gold medal (in ascending order), date of receiving the first gold medal (in ascending order), respectively.

Fourteen female athletes won three or more gold medals in water polo at the World Aquatics Championships. They were all members of the United States women's national water polo team. Rachel Fattal, Maddie Musselman and Maggie Steffens are the only athletes (men or women) to win five gold medals in water polo at the World Aquatics Championships.

There are twenty six female athletes who won two gold medals in water polo at the World Aquatics Championships.

Legend

- – Hosts

Female athletes who won three or more gold medals in water polo at the World Aquatics Championships
Rk	Player	Birth	Height	Women's team	Pos	Water polo tournament								Period (age of first/last)	Medals				Ref
Rk	Player	Birth	Height	Women's team	Pos	Water polo tournament								Period (age of first/last)	G	S	B	T	Ref
1	Rachel Fattal	1993	1.73 m (5 ft 8 in)	United States	FP	2013	2015	2017	2019	2022	2023	2024		11 years (19/30)	5	0	0	5	
1	Maddie Musselman	1998	1.81 m (5 ft 11 in)	United States	FP	2015	2017	2019	2022	2023	2024			8 years (17/25)	5	0	0	5	
1	Maggie Steffens	1993	1.73 m (5 ft 8 in)	United States	FP	2011	2013	2015	2017	2019	2022	2023	2024	12 years (18/30)	5	0	0	5	
4	Kaleigh Gilchrist	1992	1.76 m (5 ft 9 in)	United States	FP	2015		2019	2022	2023	2024			8 years (23/31)	4	0	0	4	
4	Ashleigh Johnson	1994	1.86 m (6 ft 1 in)	United States	GK	2015		2019	2022	2023	2024			9 years (20/29)	4	0	0	4	
4	Amanda Longan	1997	1.85 m (6 ft 1 in)	United States	GK	2017	2019	2022	2023	2024	2025			8 years (20/28)	4	0	0	4	
7	Heather Petri	1978	1.80 m (5 ft 11 in)	United States	FP	2001	2003	2005	2007	2009	2011			10 years (23/33)	3	1	0	4	
7	Brenda Villa	1980	1.63 m (5 ft 4 in)	United States	FP	1998	2001	2003	2005	2007	2009	2011		13 years (17/31)	3	1	0	4	
9	Kami Craig	1987	1.81 m (5 ft 11 in)	United States	FP	2007	2009	2011	2013	2015				8 years (19/28)	3	0	0	3	
9	Makenzie Fischer	1997	1.86 m (6 ft 1 in)	United States	FP	2015	2017	2019						4 years (18/22)	3	0	0	3	
9	Kiley Neushul	1993	1.73 m (5 ft 8 in)	United States	FP	2013	2015	2017	2019					6 years (20/26)	3	0	0	3	
9	Jordan Raney	1996	1.78 m (5 ft 10 in)	United States	FP	2017		2022	2023	2024				6 years (21/27)	3	0	0	3	
9	Melissa Seidemann	1990	1.83 m (6 ft 0 in)	United States	FP	2011	2013	2015	2017	2019				8 years (21/29)	3	0	0	3	
9	Alys Williams	1994	1.81 m (5 ft 11 in)	United States	FP	2015	2017	2019						4 years (21/25)	3	0	0	3	
Rk	Player	Birth	Height	Women's team	Pos	Water polo tournament								Period (age of first/last)	G	S	B	T	Ref
Rk	Player	Birth	Height	Women's team	Pos	Water polo tournament								Period (age of first/last)	Medals				Ref

=== Multiple medalists ===
The following table is pre-sorted by total number of medals (in descending order), number of gold medals (in descending order), number of silver medals (in descending order), name of the player (in ascending order), date of receiving the last medal (in ascending order), date of receiving the first medal (in ascending order), respectively.

Nine female athletes won five medals in water polo at the World Aquatics Championships. Spanish player Anni Espar is the only female athlete to win six medals in water polo at the World Aquatics Championships.

Legend

- – Hosts

Female athletes who won four medals in water polo at the World Aquatics Championships
Rk	Player	Birth	Height	Women's team	Pos	Water polo tournament											Period (age of first/last)	Medals				Ref
Rk	Player	Birth	Height	Women's team	Pos	Water polo tournament											Period (age of first/last)	G	S	B	T	Ref
1	Anni Espar	1993	1.80 m (5 ft 11 in)	Spain	FP	2011	2013	2015	2017	2019	2022	2023	2024	2025			14 years (18/32)	1	3	2	6	
2	Rachel Fattal	1993	1.73 m (5 ft 8 in)	United States	FP	2013	2015	2017	2019	2022	2023	2024					11 years (19/30)	5	0	0	5	
2	Maddie Musselman	1998	1.81 m (5 ft 11 in)	United States	FP	2015	2017	2019	2022	2023	2024						8 years (17/25)	5	0	0	5	
2	Maggie Steffens	1993	1.73 m (5 ft 8 in)	United States	FP	2011	2013	2015	2017	2019	2022	2023	2024				12 years (18/30)	5	0	0	5	
5	Laura Ester	1990	1.70 m (5 ft 7 in)	Spain	GK	2009	2011	2013	2015	2017	2019	2022	2023	2024			15 years (19/34)	1	3	1	5	
5	Pili Peña	1986	1.74 m (5 ft 9 in)	Spain	FP	2005	2007	2009	2011	2013	2015	2017	2019	2022	2023	2024	18 years (19/37)	1	3	1	5	
7	Paula Crespí	1998	1.75 m (5 ft 9 in)	Spain	FP	2017	2019		2023	2024	2025						8 years (19/27)	0	3	2	5	
7	Paula Leitón	2000	1.87 m (6 ft 2 in)	Spain	FP	2015	2017	2019	2022	2023	2024	2025					10 years (15/25)	0	3	2	5	
7	Beatriz Ortiz	1995	1.76 m (5 ft 9 in)	Spain	FP	2017	2019	2022	2023	2024	2025						8 years (22/30)	0	3	2	5	
Rk	Player	Birth	Height	Women's team	Pos	Water polo tournament											Period (age of first/last)	G	S	B	T	Ref
Rk	Player	Birth	Height	Women's team	Pos	Water polo tournament											Period (age of first/last)	Medals				Ref

== See also ==
- Water polo at the World Aquatics Championships
- List of World Aquatics Championships men's water polo tournament records and statistics
- List of World Aquatics Championships women's water polo tournament records and statistics
- List of world champions in men's water polo
- List of world champions in women's water polo
- List of Olympic medalists in water polo

== Sources ==
=== Official Reports (FINA) ===
PDF documents on the FINA website:

- HistoFINA – Water polo medalists and statistics (as of September 2019) (archive) (pp. 14–18, 57–62)

=== Official Results Books (FINA) ===
PDF documents on the Omega Timing website:

- 12th World Championship (2007)
  - General information, Men's Round Summary, Women's Round Summary.

PDF documents on the Sport Result website:

- 13th World Championship (2009)
  - Results, Participants, Statistics.
  - Men's Competition Schedule, Men's Round Summary, Women's Competition Schedule, Women's Round Summary.
- 14th World Championship (2011)
  - Results, Participants, Statistics.
  - Men's Competition Schedule, Men's Round Summary, Women's Competition Schedule, Women's Round Summary.
- 15th World Championship (2013)
  - Results, Participants, Statistics.
  - Men's Competition Schedule, Men's Round Summary, Women's Competition Schedule, Women's Round Summary.
- 16th World Championship (2015)
  - Results, Participants, Statistics.
  - Men's Competition Schedule, Men's Round Summary, Women's Competition Schedule, Women's Round Summary.
- 17th World Championship (2017)
  - Results, Participants, Statistics.
  - Men's Competition Schedule, Men's Round Summary, Women's Competition Schedule, Women's Round Summary.
- 18th World Championship (2019)
  - Results, Participants, Statistics.
  - Men's Competition Schedule, Men's Round Summary, Women's Competition Schedule, Women's Round Summary.
- 19th World Championship (2022)
  - Results, Participants, Statistics.
  - Men's Competition Schedule, Men's Round Summary, Women's Competition Schedule, Women's Round Summary.
- 20th World Championship (2023)
  - Results, Participants, Statistics.
  - Men's Competition Schedule, Men's Round Summary, Women's Competition Schedule, Women's Round Summary.
- 21st World Championship (2024)
  - Results, Participants, Statistics.
  - Men's Competition Schedule, Men's Round Summary, Women's Competition Schedule, Women's Round Summary.

=== Olympedia ===
Water polo on the Olympedia website:

- Olympians Who Won a Medal at the World Aquatics Championships

=== Todor66 ===
Water polo on the Todor66 website:

- Water Polo World Championship
- Men's Water Polo World Championship
- Women's Water Polo World Championship
- 1973 World Championship (men's tournament)
- 1975 World Championship (men's tournament)
- 1978 World Championship (men's tournament)
- 1982 World Championship (men's tournament)
- 1986 World Championship (men's tournament, women's tournament)
- 1991 World Championship (men's tournament, women's tournament)
- 1994 World Championship (men's tournament, women's tournament)
- 1998 World Championship (men's tournament, women's tournament)
- 2001 World Championship (men's tournament, women's tournament)
- 2003 World Championship (men's tournament, women's tournament)
- 2005 World Championship (men's tournament, women's tournament)
- 2007 World Championship (men's tournament, women's tournament)
- 2009 World Championship (men's tournament, women's tournament)
- 2011 World Championship (men's tournament, women's tournament)
- 2013 World Championship (men's tournament, women's tournament)
- 2015 World Championship (men's tournament, women's tournament)
- 2017 World Championship (men's tournament, women's tournament)
- 2019 World Championship (men's tournament, women's tournament)
- 2022 World Championship (men's tournament, women's tournament)
- 2023 World Championship (men's tournament, women's tournament)
- 2024 World Championship (men's tournament, women's tournament)
- 2025 World Championship (men's tournament, women's tournament)
