= Water polo at the 2023 World Aquatics Championships =

World Aquatics Championships event

- Host city: Fukuoka, Japan
- Date(s): 16–29 July
- Venue(s): Marine Messe Fukuoka
- Events: 2

Two water polo competitions took place as part of the 2023 World Aquatics Championships, and were held between 16 and 29 July 2023 at the Marine Messe Fukuoka in Fukuoka, Japan.

== Schedule ==
Two competitions were held.

All times are local (UTC+9).

Date	Time	Round
16 July 2023	09:00	Preliminary round
17 July 2023	09:00	Preliminary round
18 July 2023	09:00	Preliminary round
19 July 2023	09:00	Preliminary round
20 July 2023	09:00	Preliminary round
21 July 2023	09:00	Preliminary round
22 July 2023	09:00	Play-offs/Placement matches
23 July 2023	09:00	Play-offs/Placement matches
24 July 2023	09:00	Quarterfinals/Placement matches
25 July 2023	09:00	Quarterfinals/Placement matches
26 July 2023	09:00	Semifinals/Placement matches
27 July 2023	09:00	Semifinals/Placement matches
28 July 2023	11:30	Women's finals
29 July 2023	11:30	Men's finals

== Qualification ==
A total of 16 teams qualified for each tournament.

=== Men ===
Event	Dates	Hosts	Quota	Qualifier(s)
Host nation	—	—	1	Japan
2022 World League	8 January – 27 July 2022	(France) Strasbourg	2	Italy; United States
2022 World Championships	21 June – 3 July 2022	(Hungary) Budapest	4	Spain; Greece; Croatia; Serbia
2022 European Championship	29 August – 10 September 2022	(Croatia) Split	3	Hungary; France; Montenegro
2022 Asian Championship	7–14 November 2022	(Thailand) Samut Prakan	2	China; Kazakhstan
2023 Pan American Water Polo Championships	3–8 April 2023	(Brazil) Bauru	2	Canada; ~~Brazil~~; Argentina
African Wildcard	—	—	1	South Africa
Oceanian Wildcard	—	—	1	Australia
Total			16	

Due the limited budget and the proximity of the date of the championship with the 2023 Pan American Games, Brazil opted for the withdrawal before the tournament and was replaced by Argentina.

=== Women ===
Event	Dates	Hosts	Quota	Qualifier(s)
Host nation	—	—	1	Japan
2022 World League	25 January – 6 November 2022	(Spain) Santa Cruz de Tenerife	2	Spain; Hungary
2022 World Championships	20 June – 2 July 2022	(Hungary) Budapest	4	United States; Netherlands; Italy; Australia
2022 European Championship	27 August – 10 September 2022	(Croatia) Split	3	Greece; Israel; France
2022 Asian Championship	7–14 November 2022	(Thailand) Samut Prakan	2	China; Kazakhstan
2023 Pan American Water Polo Championships	3–8 April 2023	(Brazil) Bauru	2	Canada; ~~Brazil~~; Argentina
African Wildcard	—	—	1	South Africa
Oceanian Wildcard	—	—	1	New Zealand
Total			16	

Due the limited budget and the proximity of the date of the championship with the 2023 Pan American Games, Brazil withdrew before the tournament and was replaced by Argentina.

== Medal summary ==
=== Medal table ===
* Host nation (Japan)

Rank	Nation	Gold	Silver	Bronze	Total
1	Hungary	1	0	0	1
1	Netherlands	1	0	0	1
3	Spain	0	1	1	2
4	Greece	0	1	0	1
5	Italy	0	0	1	1
Totals (5 entries)		2	2	2	6

=== Medalists ===
Event	Gold	Silver	Bronze
Men	Hungary; Márton Lévai; Dániel Angyal; Krisztián Manhercz; Zoltán Pohl; Márton Vámos; Ádám Nagy; Gergő Zalánki; Gergő Fekete; Toni Német; Dénes Varga; Szilárd Jansik; Vendel Vigvári; Soma Vogel; Erik Molnár; Vince Vigvári	Greece; Emmanouil Zerdevas; Konstantinos Genidounias; Dimitrios Skoumpakis; Efstathios Kalogeropoulos; Ioannis Fountoulis; Alexandros Papanastasiou; Georgios Dervisis; Stylianos Argyropoulos; Dimitrios Nikolaidis; Konstantinos Kakaris; Ioannis Alafragkis; Konstantinos Gkiouvetsis; Panagiotis Tzortzatos; Nikolaos Gkillas; Aristeidis Chalyvopoulos	Spain; Unai Aguirre; Alberto Munárriz; Álvaro Granados; Bernat Sanahuja; Miguel del Toro; Marc Larumbe; Martin Famera; Sergi Cabañas; Roger Tahull; Felipe Perrone; Blai Mallarach; Alejandro Bustos; Eduardo Lorrio; Alberto Barroso; Fran Valera
Women	Netherlands; Laura Aarts; Iris Wolves; Brigitte Sleeking; Sabrina van der Sloot; Maartje Keuning; Simone van de Kraats; Bente Rogge; Vivian Sevenich; Kitty-Lynn Joustra; Lieke Rogge; Lola Moolhuijzen; Nina ten Broek; Sarah Buis; Marit van der Weijden; Maxine Schaap	Spain; Laura Ester; Cristina Nogué; Anni Espar; Beatriz Ortiz; Nona Pérez; Paula Crespí; Elena Ruiz; Pili Peña; Judith Forca; Paula Camus; Maica García Godoy; Paula Leitón; Martina Terré; Ariadna Ruiz	Italy; Giuseppina Condorelli; Chiara Tabani; Giuditta Galardi; Silvia Avegno; Sofia Giustini; Dafne Bettini; Domitilla Picozzi; Roberta Bianconi; Valeria Palmieri; Claudia Marletta; Agnese Cocchiere; Giulia Viacava; Caterina Banchelli; Lucrezia Cergol; Veronica Gant
