= List of World Aquatics Championships men's water polo tournament records and statistics =

This is a list of records and statistics of the men's water polo tournament at the World Aquatics Championships since the inaugural official edition in 1973.

== Confederation statistics ==
=== Best performances by tournament ===
This is a summary of the best performances of each confederation in each tournament.

Legend

- 1^{st} – Champions
- 2^{nd} – Runners-up
- 3^{rd} – Third place
- 4^{th} – Fourth place
- Q – Qualified for forthcoming tournament

Confederation	1973	1975	1978	1982	1986	1991	1994	1998	2001	2003	2005	2007	2009	2011	2013	2015	2017	2019	2022	2023	2024	2025
Africa – CANA	—	—	—	15th	—	15th	15th	14th	—	—	15th	14th	15th	16th	15th	12th	16th	12th	12th	16th	15th	16th
Americas – ASUA	5th	4th	5th	5th	4th	4th	6th	7th	7th	6th	11th	9th	4th	6th	9th	7th	12th	9th	6th	7th	9th	8th
Asia – AASF	—	15th	—	10th	—	14th	12th	11th	12th	15th	14th	13th	12th	11th	12th	11th	10th	11th	9th	11th	12th	9th
Europe – LEN	1st	1st	1st	1st	1st	1st	1st	1st	1st	1st	1st	1st	1st	1st	1st	1st	1st	1st	1st	1st	1st	1st
Oceania – OSA	14th	11th	9th	11th	10th	8th	10th	4th	10th	7th	10th	10th	10th	9th	8th	8th	7th	6th	11th	10th	11th	13th
Nations	16	16	16	16	15	16	16	16	16	16	16	16	16	16	16	16	16	16	16	16	16	16

=== All-time best performances ===
This is a summary of the best performances of each confederation at the World Aquatics Championships.

Legend

- ^{*} – Host team
- ^{†} – Defunct team

Confederation	Best performance	Men's team
Africa – CANA	12th	South Africa (2015, 2019, 2022)
Americas – ASUA	4th	Cuba (1975), United States (1986, 1991, 2009)
Asia – AASF	9th	Japan (2022)
Europe – LEN	1st	Croatia (2007, 2017, 2024), Hungary (1973, 2003, 2013, 2023), Italy (1978, 1994^{*}, 2011, 2019), Serbia (2009, 2015), Serbia and Montenegro^{†} (2005), Soviet Union^{†} (1975, 1982), Spain (1998, 2001, 2022, 2025), Yugoslavia^{†} (1986, 1991)
Oceania – OSA	4th	Australia (1998^{*})

== Team statistics ==
=== Debut of teams ===
Legend

- ^{*} – Host team
- ^{†} – Defunct team

#	Year	Debuting teams					Number	Cumulative total
#	Year	Africa	Americas	Asia	Europe	Oceania	Number	Cumulative total
1	1973	–	Cuba, Mexico, United States	–	Bulgaria, Great Britain, Greece, Hungary, Israel, Italy, Netherlands, Romania, Soviet Union^{†}, Spain, West Germany^{†}, Yugoslavia^{*†}	Australia	16	16
2	1975	–	Canada, Colombia^{*}	Iran	–	–	3	19
3	1978	–	–	–	–	–	0	19
4	1982	Egypt	–	China	France	New Zealand	4	23
5	1986	–	Brazil	–	–	–	1	24
6	1991	–	–	–	Germany	–	1	25
7	1994	South Africa	–	Kazakhstan	Croatia, Russia	–	4	29
8	1998	–	–	–	Yugoslavia^{†} (Note: After the breakup of Yugoslavia, FR Yugoslavia men's national water polo team participated at the 1998 and 2001 World Aquatics Championships. In 2003, after the country was renamed from FR Yugoslavia to Serbia and Montenegro, the team was also renamed to Serbia and Montenegro men's national water polo team.), Slovakia	–	2	31
9	2001	–	–	Japan^{*}	–	–	1	32
10	2003	–	–	–	–	–	0	32
#	Year	Africa	Americas	Asia	Europe	Oceania	Number	Cumulative total
11	2005	–	–	–	–	–	0	32
12	2007	–	–	–	Serbia	–	1	33
13	2009	–	–	–	Macedonia, Montenegro	–	2	35
14	2011	–	–	–	–	–	0	35
15	2013	–	–	–	–	–	0	35
16	2015	–	Argentina	–	–	–	1	36
17	2017	–	–	–	–	–	0	36
18	2019	–	–	South Korea^{*}	–	–	1	37
19	2022	–	–	–	Georgia	–	1	38
20	2023	–	–	–	–	–	0	38
21	2024	–	–	–	–	–	0	38
22	2025	–	–	Singapore^{*}	–	–	1	39
Total		2	7	6	22	2		

=== Results of host teams and defending finalists ===
Legend

- ^{†} – Defunct team

#	Year	Host team	Finish	Defending champions	Finish	Defending runners-up	Finish
1	1973	Yugoslavia^{†}	3rd of 16 teams				
2	1975	Colombia	16th of 16 teams	Hungary	2nd of 16 teams	Soviet Union^{†}	1st of 16 teams
3	1978	West Germany^{†}	7th of 16 teams	Soviet Union^{†}	4th of 16 teams	Hungary	2nd of 16 teams
4	1982	Ecuador	Did not participate	Italy	9th of 16 teams	Hungary	2nd of 16 teams
5	1986	Spain	5th of 15 teams	Soviet Union^{†}	3rd of 15 teams	Hungary	9th of 15 teams
6	1991	Australia	8th of 16 teams	Yugoslavia^{†}	1st of 16 teams	Italy	6th of 16 teams
7	1994	Italy	1st of 16 teams	Yugoslavia^{†}	Defunct	Spain	2nd of 16 teams
8	1998	Australia	4th of 16 teams	Italy	5th of 16 teams	Spain	1st of 16 teams
9	2001	Japan	16th of 16 teams	Spain	1st of 16 teams	Hungary	5th of 16 teams
10	2003	Spain	5th of 16 teams	Spain	5th of 16 teams	Yugoslavia^{†}	3rd of 16 teams
11	2005	Canada	13th of 16 teams	Hungary	2nd of 16 teams	Italy	8th of 16 teams
#	Year	Host team	Finish	Defending champions	Finish	Defending runners-up	Finish
12	2007	Australia	10th of 16 teams	Serbia and Montenegro^{†}	Defunct	Hungary	2nd of 16 teams
13	2009	Italy	11th of 16 teams	Croatia	3rd of 16 teams	Hungary	5th of 16 teams
14	2011	China	15th of 16 teams	Serbia	2nd of 16 teams	Spain	5th of 16 teams
15	2013	Spain	5th of 16 teams	Italy	4th of 16 teams	Serbia	7th of 16 teams
16	2015	Russia	14th of 16 teams	Hungary	6th of 16 teams	Montenegro	5th of 16 teams
17	2017	Hungary	2nd of 16 teams	Serbia	3rd of 16 teams	Croatia	1st of 16 teams
18	2019	South Korea	15th of 16 teams	Croatia	3rd of 16 teams	Hungary	4th of 16 teams
19	2022	Hungary	7th of 16 teams	Italy	2nd of 16 teams	Spain	1st of 16 teams
20	2023	Japan	11th of 16 teams	Spain	3rd of 16 teams	Italy	5th of 16 teams
21	2024	Qatar	Did not participate	Hungary	7th of 16 teams	Greece	5th of 16 teams
22	2025	Singapore	15th of 16 teams	Croatia	5th of 16 teams	Italy	7th of 16 teams
#	Year	Host team	Finish	Defending champions	Finish	Defending runners-up	Finish

=== Comprehensive team results by tournament ===
Note: Results of qualification tournaments are not included.

Legend

- 1st – Champions
- 2nd – Runners-up
- 3rd – Third place
- 4th – Fourth place
- Q – Qualified for forthcoming tournament
- – Hosts
- ^{†} – Defunct team

Africa – CANA (2 teams)
Men's team	1973	1975	1978	1982	1986	1991	1994	1998	2001	2003	2005	2007	2009	2011	2013	2015	2017	2019	2022	2023	2024	2025	Years
Egypt				15th		15th																	2
South Africa							15th	14th			15th	14th	15th	16th	15th	12th	16th	12th	12th	16th	15th	16th	14
Americas – ASUA (7 teams)
Men's team	1973	1975	1978	1982	1986	1991	1994	1998	2001	2003	2005	2007	2009	2011	2013	2015	2017	2019	2022	2023	2024	2025	Years
Argentina																16th				13th			2
Brazil					12th			12th	13th	13th			13th	14th		10th	12th	13th	15th	WD	14th	12th	12
Canada		14th	14th	14th	13th	13th	14th	13th	15th	14th	13th	12th	8th	10th	11th	9th	15th		16th	12th		11th	19
Colombia		16th																					1
Cuba	6th	4th	10th	5th	7th	11th	11th				12th												8
Mexico	9th	9th	15th																				3
United States	5th	8th	5th	6th	4th	4th	6th	7th	7th	6th	11th	9th	4th	6th	9th	7th	13th	9th	6th	7th	9th	8th	22
Asia – AASF (6 teams)
Men's team	1973	1975	1978	1982	1986	1991	1994	1998	2001	2003	2005	2007	2009	2011	2013	2015	2017	2019	2022	2023	2024	2025	Years
China				10th		14th				16th	16th	13th	12th	15th	14th	15th				15th	12th	14th	12
Iran		15th						15th															2
Japan									16th	15th	14th	16th		11th		13th	10th	11th	9th	11th	13th	9th	12
Kazakhstan	Part of Soviet Union						12th	11th	12th				16th	13th	12th	11th	11th	14th	14th	14th	16th		12
South Korea																		15th					1
Singapore																						15th	1
Europe – LEN (22 teams)
Men's team	1973	1975	1978	1982	1986	1991	1994	1998	2001	2003	2005	2007	2009	2011	2013	2015	2017	2019	2022	2023	2024	2025	Years
Bulgaria	13th	12th	8th																				3
Croatia	Part of Yugoslavia						4th	9th	8th	9th	4th	1st	3rd	3rd	3rd	2nd	1st	3rd	4th	9th	1st	5th	16
France				13th	8th	12th											14th			6th	4th		6
Georgia	Part of Soviet Union																		10th				1
Germany	See West Germany					5th	9th		14th	11th	9th	8th	6th	8th	10th			8th	13th				11
Great Britain	15th																						1
Greece	12th		12th	12th	11th	10th	7th	8th	6th	4th	3rd	6th			6th	3rd	4th	7th	3rd	2nd	5th	3rd	19
Hungary	1st	2nd	2nd	2nd	9th	3rd	5th	2nd	5th	1st	2nd	2nd	5th	4th	1st	6th	2nd	4th	7th	1st	7th	2nd	22
Israel	16th		16th		15th																		3
Italy	4th	3rd	1st	9th	2nd	6th	1st	5th	4th	2nd	8th	5th	11th	1st	4th	4th	6th	1st	2nd	5th	2nd	7th	22
Montenegro	Part of Yugoslavia						Part of FRY / SCG						9th	7th	2nd	5th	5th	10th	8th	8th	8th	6th	10
Men's team	1973	1975	1978	1982	1986	1991	1994	1998	2001	2003	2005	2007	2009	2011	2013	2015	2017	2019	2022	2023	2024	2025	Years
Netherlands	8th	7th	13th	4th	14th		8th		9th														7
North Macedonia	Part of Yugoslavia												14th										1
Romania	7th	5th	6th			9th	13th			12th	6th	11th	7th	12th	13th						10th	10th	13
Russia	Part of Soviet Union						3rd	6th	3rd	10th	7th	7th				14th	8th		DQ	DQ	DQ	DQ	8
Serbia	Part of Yugoslavia						Part of FRY / SCG					4th	1st	2nd	7th	1st	3rd	5th	5th	4th	6th	4th	11
Serbia and Montenegro^{†}	Part of Yugoslavia							3rd	2nd	3rd	1st	Defunct											4
Slovakia	Part of Czechoslovakia							10th	11th	8th													3
Soviet Union^{†}	2nd	1st	4th	1st	3rd	7th	Defunct																6
Spain	10th	10th	11th	8th	5th	2nd	2nd	1st	1st	5th	5th	3rd	2nd	5th	5th		9th	2nd	1st	3rd	3rd	1st	21
West Germany^{†}	11th	6th	7th	3rd	6th	See Germany																	5
Yugoslavia^{†}	3rd	13th	3rd	7th	1st	1st	Defunct																6
Oceania – OSA (2 teams)
Men's team	1973	1975	1978	1982	1986	1991	1994	1998	2001	2003	2005	2007	2009	2011	2013	2015	2017	2019	2022	2023	2024	2025	Years
Australia	14th	11th	9th	11th	10th	8th	10th	4th	10th	7th	10th	10th	10th	9th	8th	8th	7th	6th	11th	10th	11th	13th	22
New Zealand				16th		16th	16th	16th				15th			16th			16th					7
Total teams	16	16	16	16	15	16	16	16	16	16	16	16	16	16	16	16	16	16	16	16	16	16	

=== Finishes in the top four ===
The following table is pre-sorted by total finishes in the top four (in descending order), number of gold medals (in descending order), number of silver medals (in descending order), number of bronze medals (in descending order), name of the team (in ascending order), respectively.

Legend

- ^{*} – Host team
- ^{†} – Defunct team

Rk	Men's team	Total	Champions	Runners-up	Third place	Fourth place	First	Last
1	Hungary	15	4 (1973, 2003, 2013, 2023)	8 (1975, 1978, 1982, 1998, 2005, 2007, 2017^{*}, 2025)	1 (1991)	2 (2011, 2019)	1973	2025
2	Italy	13	4 (1978, 1994^{*}, 2011, 2019)	4 (1986, 2003, 2022, 2024)	1 (1975)	4 (1973, 2001, 2013, 2015)	1973	2024
3	Spain	11	4 (1998, 2001, 2022, 2025)	4 (1991, 1994, 2009, 2019)	3 (2007, 2023, 2024)		1991	2025
4	Croatia	11	3 (2007, 2017, 2024)	1 (2015)	4 (2009, 2011, 2013, 2019)	3 (1994, 2005, 2022)	1994	2024
5	Serbia	7	2 (2009, 2015)	1 (2011)	1 (2017)	3 (2007, 2023, 2025)	2007	2025
6	Greece	7		1 (2023)	4 (2005, 2015, 2022, 2025)	2 (2003, 2017)	2003	2025
7	Soviet Union^{†}	5	2 (1975, 1982)	1 (1973)	1 (1986)	1 (1978)	1973	1986
8	Yugoslavia^{†}	4	2 (1986, 1991)		2 (1973^{*}, 1978)		1973	1991
9	Yugoslavia^{†} / Serbia and Montenegro^{†}	4	1 (2005)	1 (2001)	2 (1998, 2003)		1998	2005
10	United States	3				3 (1986, 1991, 2009)	1986	2009
11	Russia	2			2 (1994, 2001)		1994	2001
12	Montenegro	1		1 (2013)			2013	2013
13	West Germany^{†}	1			1 (1982)		1982	1982
14	Australia	1				1 (1998^{*})	1998	1998
14	Cuba	1				1 (1975)	1975	1975
14	France	1				1 (2024)	2024	2024
14	Netherlands	1				1 (1982)	1982	1982
Rk	Men's team	Total	Champions	Runners-up	Third place	Fourth place	First	Last

=== Medal table ===
The following table is pre-sorted by number of gold medals (in descending order), number of silver medals (in descending order), number of bronze medals (in descending order), name of the team (in ascending order), respectively.

Legend

- ^{†} – Defunct team

Rank	Men's team	Gold	Silver	Bronze	Total
1	Hungary	4	8	1	13
2	Spain	4	4	3	11
3	Italy	4	4	1	9
4	Croatia	3	1	4	8
5	Serbia	2	1	1	4
5	Soviet Union^{†}	2	1	1	4
7	Yugoslavia^{†}	2	0	2	4
8	Yugoslavia^{†} / Serbia and Montenegro^{†}	1	1	2	4
9	Greece	0	1	4	5
10	Montenegro	0	1	0	1
11	Russia	0	0	2	2
12	West Germany^{†}	0	0	1	1
Totals (12 entries)		22	22	22	66

=== Champions ===
The following table shows results of world champions in men's water polo by tournament.

Legend

- 6 – Winning 6 matches during the tournament
- 4 – Drawing 4 matches during the tournament
- 2 – Losing 2 matches during the tournament
- 100.0% – Winning all matches during the tournament
- team – Winning streak (winning three or more world championships in a row)
- – Host team
- ^{†} – Defunct team

Abbreviation

- MP – Matches played
- W – Won
- D – Drawn
- L – Lost
- GF – Goals for
- GA – Goals against
- GD – Goals difference
- GF/MP – Goals for per match
- GA/MP – Goals against per match
- GD/MP – Goals difference per match

Results of champions by tournament
#	Men's tournament	Champion	MP	W	D	L	Win %	GF	GA	GD	GF/MP	GA/MP	GD/MP
1	Belgrade 1973	Hungary (1st title)	8	7	1	0	87.5%	58	24	34	7.250	3.000	4.250
2	Cali 1975	Soviet Union^{†} (1st title)	8	6	2	0	75.0%	49	26	23	6.125	3.250	2.875
3	West Berlin 1978	Italy (1st title)	8	5	3	0	62.5%	41	31	10	5.125	3.875	1.250
4	Guayaquil 1982	Soviet Union^{†} (2nd title)	7	6	1	0	85.7%	68	41	27	9.714	5.857	3.857
5	Madrid 1986	Yugoslavia^{†} (1st title)	6	5	1	0	83.3%	61	43	18	10.167	7.167	3.000
6	Perth 1991	Yugoslavia^{†} (2nd title)	7	6	0	1	85.7%	81	46	35	11.571	6.571	5.000
7	Rome 1994	Italy (2nd title)	7	7	0	0	100.0%	65	39	26	9.286	5.571	3.714
8	Perth 1998	Spain (1st title)	8	8	0	0	100.0%	65	35	30	8.125	4.375	3.750
9	Fukuoka 2001	Spain (2nd title)	8	8	0	0	100.0%	63	27	36	7.875	3.375	4.500
10	Barcelona 2003	Hungary (2nd title)	6	5	1	0	83.3%	62	37	25	10.333	6.167	4.167
11	Montreal 2005	Serbia and Montenegro^{†} (1st title)	6	6	0	0	100.0%	69	29	40	11.500	4.833	6.667
12	Melbourne 2007	Croatia (1st title)	6	6	0	0	100.0%	65	40	25	10.833	6.667	4.167
13	Rome 2009	Serbia (1st title)	7	5	1	1	71.4%	80	60	20	11.429	8.571	2.857
14	Shanghai 2011	Italy (3rd title)	6	6	0	0	100.0%	59	33	26	9.833	5.500	4.333
15	Barcelona 2013	Hungary (3rd title)	7	5	1	1	71.4%	76	54	22	10.857	7.714	3.143
16	Kazan 2015	Serbia (2nd title)	6	6	0	0	100.0%	73	43	30	12.167	7.167	5.000
17	Budapest 2017	Croatia (2nd title)	6	6	0	0	100.0%	70	47	23	11.667	7.833	3.833
18	Gwangju 2019	Italy (4th title)	6	6	0	0	100.0%	60	40	20	10.000	6.667	3.333
19	Budapest 2022	Spain (3rd title)	5	4	1	0	80.0%	68	34	34	13.600	6.800	6.800
20	Fukuoka 2023	Hungary (4th title)	6	5	1	0	83.3%	84	64	20	14.000	10.667	3.333
21	Doha 2024	Croatia (3rd title)	7	4	2	1	57.1%	107	63	44	15.286	9.000	6.286
22	Singapore 2025	Spain (4th title)	6	5	1	0	83.3%	78	57	21	13.000	9.500	3.500
#	Men's tournament	Total	147	127	16	4	86.4%	1502	913	589	10.218	6.211	4.007
#	Men's tournament	Champion	MP	W	D	L	Win %	GF	GA	GD	GF/MP	GA/MP	GD/MP

Sources:

- Official Reports (FINA) (PDF): "World Championship" (p. 15);
- Todor66: "Men's Water Polo World Championship".

The following table shows men's teams that won all matches during the tournament.

Winning all matches during the tournament
#	Year	Champion	MP	W	D	L	Win %
1	1994	Italy (2nd title)	7	7	0	0	100.0%
2	1998	Spain (1st title)	8	8	0	0	100.0%
3	2001	Spain (2nd title)	8	8	0	0	100.0%
4	2005	Serbia and Montenegro^{†} (1st title)	6	6	0	0	100.0%
5	2007	Croatia (1st title)	6	6	0	0	100.0%
6	2011	Italy (3rd title)	6	6	0	0	100.0%
7	2015	Serbia (2nd title)	6	6	0	0	100.0%
8	2017	Croatia (2nd title)	6	6	0	0	100.0%
9	2019	Italy (4th title)	6	6	0	0	100.0%
#	Year	Champion	MP	W	D	L	Win %

The following tables show records of goals for per match.

Top 5 most goals for per match
Rk	Year	Champion	MP	GF	GF/MP
1	2024	Croatia (3rd title)	7	107	15.286
2	2023	Hungary (4th title)	6	84	14.000
3	2022	Spain (3rd title)	5	68	13.600
4	2025	Spain (4th title)	6	78	13.000
5	2015	Serbia (2nd title)	6	73	12.167

Top 5 fewest goals for per match
Rk	Year	Champion	MP	GF	GF/MP
1	1978	Italy (1st title)	8	41	5.125
2	1975	Soviet Union^{†} (1st title)	8	49	6.125
3	1973	Hungary (1st title)	8	58	7.250
4	2001	Spain (2nd title)	8	63	7.875
5	1998	Spain (1st title)	8	65	8.125

Historical progression of records – goals for per match
Goals for per match	Achievement	Year	Champion	Date of winning gold	Duration of record
7.250	Set record	1973	Hungary (1st title)	9 September 1973	8 years, 332 days
9.714	Broke record	1982	Soviet Union^{†} (2nd title)	7 August 1982	4 years, 15 days
10.167	Broke record	1986	Yugoslavia^{†} (1st title)	22 August 1986	4 years, 144 days
11.571	Broke record	1991	Yugoslavia^{†} (2nd title)	13 January 1991	24 years, 207 days
12.167	Broke record	2015	Serbia (2nd title)	8 August 2015	6 years, 329 days
13.600	Broke record	2022	Spain (3rd title)	3 July 2022	1 year, 26 days
14.000	Broke record	2023	Hungary (4th title)	29 July 2023	203 days
15.286	Broke record	2024	Croatia (3rd title)	17 February 2024	2 years, 11 days

The following tables show records of goals against per match.

Top 5 most goals against per match
Rk	Year	Champion	MP	GA	GA/MP
1	2023	Hungary (4th title)	6	64	10.667
2	2025	Spain (3rd title)	6	57	9.500
3	2024	Croatia (3rd title)	7	63	9.000
4	2009	Serbia (1st title)	7	60	8.571
5	2017	Croatia (2nd title)	6	47	7.833

Top 5 fewest goals against per match
Rk	Year	Champion	MP	GA	GA/MP
1	1973	Hungary (1st title)	8	24	3.000
2	1975	Soviet Union^{†} (1st title)	8	26	3.250
3	2001	Spain (2nd title)	8	27	3.375
4	1978	Italy (1st title)	8	31	3.875
5	1998	Spain (1st title)	8	35	4.375

The following tables show records of goals difference per match.

Top 5 most goals difference per match
Rk	Year	Champion	MP	GD	GD/MP
1	2022	Spain (3rd title)	5	34	6.800
2	2005	Serbia and Montenegro^{†} (1st title)	6	40	6.667
3	2024	Croatia (3rd title)	7	44	6.286
4	1991	Yugoslavia^{†} (2nd title)	7	35	5.000
4	2015	Serbia (2nd title)	6	30	5.000

Top 5 fewest goals difference per match
Rk	Year	Champion	MP	GD	GD/MP
1	1978	Italy (1st title)	8	10	1.250
2	2009	Serbia (1st title)	7	20	2.857
3	1975	Soviet Union^{†} (1st title)	8	23	2.875
4	1986	Yugoslavia^{†} (1st title)	6	18	3.000
5	2013	Hungary (3rd title)	7	22	3.143

=== Team records ===
Teams having equal quantities in the tables below are ordered by the tournament the quantity was attained in (the teams that attained the quantity first are listed first). If the quantity was attained by more than one team in the same tournament, these teams are ordered alphabetically.

Tournament positions

Most titles won
4, Italy (1978, 1994, 2011, 2019); Hungary (1973, 2003, 2013, 2023); Spain (1998, 2001, 2022, 2025).
Most finishes in the top two
12, Hungary (1973, 1975, 1978, 1982, 1998, 2003, 2005, 2007, 2013, 2017, 2023, 2025).
Most finishes in the top three
13, Hungary (1973, 1975, 1978, 1982, 1991, 1998, 2003, 2005, 2007, 2013, 2017, 2023, 2025).
Most finishes in the top four
15, Hungary (1973, 1975, 1978, 1982, 1991, 1998, 2003, 2005, 2007, 2011, 2013, 2017, 2019, 2023, 2025).
Most appearances
22, Australia, Hungary, Italy, United States (have participated in every tournament).

Consecutive

Most consecutive medals
7, Croatia (2007–2009–2011–2013–2015–2017–2019).
Most consecutive golds
2, Yugoslavia (1986–1991); Spain (1998–2001).
Most consecutive silvers
3, Hungary (1975–1978–1982).
Most consecutive bronzes
3, Croatia (2009–2011–2013).
Most consecutive finishes in the top four
9, Croatia (2005–2007–2009–2011–2013–2015–2017–2019–2022).
Most consecutive appearances
22, Australia, Hungary, Italy, United States (have participated in every tournament).

Gaps

Longest gap between successive titles
30 years, Hungary (1973–2003).
Longest gap between successive appearances in the top two
16 years, Hungary (1982–1998).
Longest gap between successive appearances in the top three
10 years, Greece (2005–2015); Spain (2009–2019).
Longest gap between successive appearances in the top four
18 years, United States (1991–2009).
Longest gap between successive appearances
26 years, France (1991–2017).

Host team

Best finish by host team
Champion: Italy (1994).

Other

Most finishes in the top two without ever being champion
1, Montenegro (2013); Greece (2023).
Most finishes in the top three without ever being champion
5, Greece (2005, 2015, 2022, 2023, 2025).
Most finishes in the top four without ever being champion
7, Greece (2003, 2005, 2015, 2017, 2022, 2023, 2025).
Most finishes in the top four without ever being medaled
3, United States (1986, 1991, 2009).

== Player statistics ==
(C)	Captain	Apps	Appearances	Ref	Reference	Rk	Rank
L/R	Handedness	Pos	Playing position	FP	Field player	GK	Goalkeeper

=== Multiple gold medalists ===
The following table is pre-sorted by number of gold medals (in descending order), number of silver medals (in descending order), number of bronze medals (in descending order), date of receiving the last gold medal (in ascending order), date of receiving the first gold medal (in ascending order), name of the player (in ascending order), respectively.

Serbian player Slobodan Nikić is the first and only male athlete to win three gold medals in water polo at the World Aquatics Championships.

There are forty six male athletes who won two gold medals in water polo at the World Aquatics Championships.

Legend

- – Hosts

Male athletes who won three or more gold medals in water polo at the World Aquatics Championships
Rk	Player	Birth	Height	Men's team	Pos	Water polo tournament							Period (age of first/last)	Medals				Ref
Rk	Player	Birth	Height	Men's team	Pos	Water polo tournament							Period (age of first/last)	G	S	B	T	Ref
1	Slobodan Nikić	1983	1.97 m (6 ft 6 in)	Serbia and Montenegro	FP	2003	2005						12 years (20/32)	3	1	1	5	
1	Slobodan Nikić	1983	1.97 m (6 ft 6 in)	Serbia	FP			2007	2009	2011	2013	2015	12 years (20/32)	3	1	1	5	

=== Multiple medalists ===
The following table is pre-sorted by total number of medals (in descending order), number of gold medals (in descending order), number of silver medals (in descending order), date of receiving the last medal (in ascending order), date of receiving the first medal (in ascending order), name of the player (in ascending order), respectively.

Seventeen male athletes won five or more medals in water polo at the World Aquatics Championships. Aside from Serbian player Slobodan Nikić, all others were members of the Spain men's national water polo team (10 players) and Croatia men's national water polo team (6 players). Brazilian-born Spanish player Felipe Perrone and Croatian Andro Bušlje are the only athletes (man or woman) to win seven medals in water polo at the World Aquatics Championships.

Legend

- – Hosts

Male athletes who won five or more medals in water polo at the World Aquatics Championships
Rk	Player	Birth	Height	Men's team	Pos	Water polo tournament														Period (age of first/last)	Medals				Ref
Rk	Player	Birth	Height	Men's team	Pos	Water polo tournament														Period (age of first/last)	G	S	B	T	Ref
1	Felipe Perrone	1986	1.83 m (6 ft 0 in)	Spain	FP			2005	2007	2009	2011	2013			2019	2022	2023	2024	2025	24 years (15/39)	2	2	3	7	
1	Felipe Perrone	1986	1.83 m (6 ft 0 in)	Brazil	FP	2001	2003						2015							24 years (15/39)	2	2	3	7	
2	Andro Bušlje	1986	2.00 m (6 ft 7 in)	Croatia	FP	2005	2007	2009	2011	2013	2015	2017	2019							14 years (19/33)	2	1	4	7	
3	Maro Joković	1987	2.03 m (6 ft 8 in)	Croatia	FP	2007		2011	2013	2015	2017	2019								12 years (19/31)	2	1	3	6	
4	Slobodan Nikić	1983	1.97 m (6 ft 6 in)	Serbia and Montenegro	FP	2003	2005													12 years (20/32)	3	1	1	5	
4	Slobodan Nikić	1983	1.97 m (6 ft 6 in)	Serbia	FP			2007	2009	2011	2013	2015								12 years (20/32)	3	1	1	5	
5	Marko Bijač	1991	2.01 m (6 ft 7 in)	Croatia	GK	2013	2015	2017	2019	2022	2023	2024	2025							12 years (22/34)	2	1	2	5	
5	Alejandro Bustos	1997	1.93 m (6 ft 4 in)	Spain	FP	2017	2019	2022	2023	2024	2025									8 years (20/28)	2	1	2	5	
5	Sergi Cabañas	1996	1.91 m (6 ft 3 in)	Spain	FP	2019	2022	2023	2024	2025										6 years (23/29)	2	1	2	5	
5	Miguel de Toro	1993	2.02 m (6 ft 8 in)	Spain	FP	2017	2019	2022	2023	2024	2025									8 years (23/31)	2	1	2	5	
5	Álvaro Granados	1998	1.92 m (6 ft 4 in)	Spain	FP	2017	2019	2022	2023	2024	2025									8 years (18/26)	2	1	2	5	
5	Marc Larumbe	1994	1.93 m (6 ft 4 in)	Spain	FP	2019	2022	2023	2024	2025										6 years (25/31)	2	1	2	5	
5	Luka Lončar	1987	1.95 m (6 ft 5 in)	Croatia	FP	2013	2015	2017	2019			2024	2025							12 years (26/38)	2	1	2	5	
5	Eduardo Lorrio	1993	1.93 m (6 ft 4 in)	Spain	GK	2019	2022	2023	2024	2025										6 years (25/31)	2	1	2	5	
5	Alberto Munárriz	1994	1.95 m (6 ft 5 in)	Spain	FP	2013		2017	2019	2022	2023	2024	2025							12 years (19/31)	2	1	2	5	
5	Roger Tahull	1997	1.95 m (6 ft 5 in)	Spain	FP	2017	2019	2022	2023	2024	2025									8 years (20/28)	2	1	2	5	
15	Blai Mallarach	1987	1.87 m (6 ft 2 in)	Spain	FP	2009					2019	2022	2023	2024						15 years (21/36)	1	2	2	5	
16	Josip Pavić	1982	1.95 m (6 ft 5 in)	Croatia	GK	2001		2005	2007	2009	2011	2013	2015							14 years (19/33)	1	1	3	5	
16	Sandro Sukno	1990	2.00 m (6 ft 7 in)	Croatia	FP	2009	2011	2013	2015	2017										8 years (19/27)	1	1	3	5	
Rk	Player	Birth	Height	Men's team	Pos	Water polo tournament														Period (age of first/last)	G	S	B	T	Ref
Rk	Player	Birth	Height	Men's team	Pos	Water polo tournament														Period (age of first/last)	Medals				Ref

== See also ==
- Water polo at the World Aquatics Championships
- List of World Aquatics Championships women's water polo tournament records and statistics
- List of world champions in men's water polo
- List of world champions in women's water polo
- List of World Aquatics Championships medalists in water polo
- List of men's Olympic water polo tournament records and statistics
- List of women's Olympic water polo tournament records and statistics
- FINA Water Polo World Rankings
- List of water polo world medalists
- Major achievements in water polo by nation

== Sources ==
=== Official Reports (FINA) ===
PDF documents on the FINA website:

- HistoFINA – Water polo medalists and statistics (as of September 2019) (archive) (pp. 14–18)

=== Official Results Books (FINA) ===
PDF documents on the Omega Timing website:

- 12th World Championship (2007)
  - General information, Men's Round Summary.

PDF documents on the Sport Result website:

- 13th World Championship (2009)
  - Results, Participants, Statistics.
  - Men's Competition Schedule, Men's Round Summary.
- 14th World Championship (2011)
  - Results, Participants, Statistics.
  - Men's Competition Schedule, Men's Round Summary.
- 15th World Championship (2013)
  - Results, Participants, Statistics.
  - Men's Competition Schedule, Men's Round Summary.
- 16th World Championship (2015)
  - Results, Participants, Statistics.
  - Men's Competition Schedule, Men's Round Summary.
- 17th World Championship (2017)
  - Results, Participants, Statistics.
  - Men's Competition Schedule, Men's Round Summary.
- 18th World Championship (2019)
  - Results, Participants, Statistics.
  - Men's Competition Schedule, Men's Round Summary.
- 19th World Championship (2022)
  - Results, Participants, Statistics.
  - Men's Competition Schedule, Men's Round Summary.
- 20th World Championship (2023)
  - Results, Participants, Statistics.
  - Men's Competition Schedule, Men's Round Summary.
- 21st World Championship (2024)
  - Results, Participants, Statistics.
  - Men's Competition Schedule, Men's Round Summary.

=== Olympedia ===
Water polo on the Olympedia website:

- Olympians Who Won a Medal at the World Aquatics Championships

=== Todor66 ===
Water polo on the Todor66 website:

- Water Polo World Championship
- Men's Water Polo World Championship
- 1973 World Championship (men's tournament)
- 1975 World Championship (men's tournament)
- 1978 World Championship (men's tournament)
- 1982 World Championship (men's tournament)
- 1986 World Championship (men's tournament)
- 1991 World Championship (men's tournament)
- 1994 World Championship (men's tournament)
- 1998 World Championship (men's tournament)
- 2001 World Championship (men's tournament)
- 2003 World Championship (men's tournament)
- 2005 World Championship (men's tournament)
- 2007 World Championship (men's tournament)
- 2009 World Championship (men's tournament)
- 2011 World Championship (men's tournament)
- 2013 World Championship (men's tournament)
- 2015 World Championship (men's tournament)
- 2017 World Championship (men's tournament)
- 2019 World Championship (men's tournament)
- 2022 World Championship (men's tournament)
- 2023 World Championship (men's tournament)
- 2024 World Championship (men's tournament)
- 2025 World Championship (men's tournament)
