= 2022 Men's European Water Polo Championship squads =

This article shows all participating team squads at the 2022 Men's European Water Polo Championship.

== Group A ==
=== Georgia ===
The following is Georgia's roster at the 2022 Men's European Water Polo Championship.

Head coach: Dejan Stanojević

- Sandro Adeishvili CF
- Fabio Baraldi CF
- Andria Bitadze CF
- Valiko Dadvani DF
- Revaz Imnaishvili W
- Khvicha Jakhaia DF
- Marko Jelaca DF
- Giorgi Magrakvelidze FP
- Irakli Razmadze GK
- Jovan Sarić FP
- Nikoloz Shubladze GK
- Nika Shushiashvili W
- Saba Tkeshelashvili DF
- Boris Vapenski W
- Dušan Vasić FP

=== Italy ===
The following is Italy's roster at the 2022 Men's European Water Polo Championship.

Head coach: Sandro Campagna

- Jacopo Alesiani
- Lorenzo Bruni
- Giacomo Cannella
- Francesco Condemi
- Luca Damonte
- Marco Del Lungo GK
- Francesco Di Fulvio W
- Edoardo Di Somma AR
- Vincenzo Dolce DF
- Andrea Fondelli DF
- Matteo Iocchi Gratta
- Luca Marziali
- Gianmarco Nicosia GK
- Nicholas Presciutti DF
- Vincenzo Renzuto

=== Montenegro ===
The following is Montenegro's roster at the 2022 Men's European Water Polo Championship.

Head coach: Vladimir Gojković

- Kanstantsin Averka
- Dušan Banićević
- Bogdan Đurđić W
- Dejan Lazović GK
- Dušan Matković FP
- Marko Mršić
- Luka Murišić DF
- Miroslav Perković CF
- Marko Petković W
- Vlado Popadić FP
- Vasilije Radović DF
- Vladan Spaić CF
- Petar Tešanović GK
- Aleksa Ukropina FP
- Jovan Vujović

=== Slovakia ===
The following is Slovakia's roster at the 2022 Men's European Water Polo Championship.

Head coach: Milan Oršula

- Dani Baco
- Samuel Baláž AR
- Branislav Balogh DF
- Matej Čaraj CF
- Juraj Dily AR
- Lukáš Ďurík
- Erik Haluška AR
- Tomáš Hoferica GK
- Boris Juhász CB
- Róbert Káid DF
- Andrej Kováčik W
- Maximilian Molnár
- Lukáš Seman
- Adam Šimkovič GK
- Patrik Tisaj

== Group B ==
=== Croatia ===
The following is Croatia's roster at the 2022 Men's European Water Polo Championship.

Head coach: Ivica Tucak

- Andrija Bašić FP
- Marko Bijač GK
- Matias Biljaka DF
- Luka Bukić W
- Rino Burić DF
- Loren Fatović W
- Konstantin Kharkov
- Ivan Krapić
- Filip Kržić
- Franko Lazić W
- Jerko Marinić Kragić
- Toni Popadić GK
- Josip Vrlić CF
- Ivan Domagoj Zović
- Marko Žuvela DF

=== France ===
The following is France's roster at the 2022 Men's European Water Polo Championship.

Head coach: Florian Bruzzo

- Emil Bjorch DF
- Alexandre Bouet
- Charles Canonne W
- David Caumette
- Ugo Crousillat FP
- Andrea De Nardi DF
- Clément Dubois GK
- Hugo Fontani GK
- Denis Guerin AR
- Enzo Khasz
- Romain Marion-Vernoux
- Mehdi Marzouki CF
- Rémi Saudadier AR
- Pierre Vanpeperstraete AR
- Thomas Vernoux W

=== Greece ===
The following is Greece's roster at the 2022 Men's European Water Polo Championship.

Head coach: Thodoris Vlachos

- Ioannis Alafragkis DF
- Stylianos Argyropoulos DF
- Georgios Dervisis CF
- Konstantinos Genidounias W
- Nikolaos Gkillas
- Konstantinos Gkiouvetsis W
- Konstantinos Kakaris CF
- Nikolaos Kopeliadis
- Konstantinos Limarakis GK
- Dimitrios Nikolaidis
- Alexandros Papanastasiou FP
- Dimitrios Skoumpakis DF
- Emmanouil Solanakis
- Panagiotis Tzortzatos GK
- Angelos Vlachopoulos W

=== Malta ===
The following is Malta's roster at the 2022 Men's European Water Polo Championship.

Head coach: Karl Izzo

- Jeremy Abela CF
- Nicholas Bugelli
- Benjamin Cachia AR
- Andreas Galea W
- Liam Galea
- James Gambin AR
- Sam Gialanze
- Nicholas-Kane Grixti GK
- Ben Plumpton W
- Jake Tanti GK
- Darren Zammit CB
- Dino Zammit AR
- Matthew Zammit CF
- Nikolai Zammit

== Group С ==
=== Germany ===
The following is Germany's roster at the 2022 Men's European Water Polo Championship.

Head coach: Petar Porobić

- Zoran Božić DF
- Mateo Čuk CB
- Philipp Dolff DF
- Mark Gansen
- Kevin Götz GK
- Maurice Jüngling AR
- Ferdinand Korbel
- Phillip Kubisch
- Lukas Küppers
- Jan Rotermund DF
- Moritz Schenkel GK
- Niclas Schipper AR
- Fynn Schütze W
- Marko Stamm
- Dennis Strelezkij W

=== Netherlands ===
The following is Netherlands's roster at the 2022 Men's European Water Polo Championship.

Head coach: Arno Havenga

- Tom de Weerd AR
- Bilal Gbadamassi CF
- Lucas Gielen DF
- Ted Huijsmans GK
- Pascal Janssen AR
- Flemming Kastrop DF
- Jesse Koopman AR
- Thomas Lucas CF
- Jörn Müller AR
- Jesse Nispeling CB
- Kas Te Riele
- Guus van Ijperen CF
- Kjeld Veenhuis DF
- Eelco Wagenaar GK
- Jorn Winkelhorst CF

=== Romania ===
The following is Romania's roster at the 2022 Men's European Water Polo Championship.

Head coach: Bogdan Rath

- Victor Antipa W
- Silvian Colodrovschi
- Raducu-Alex Dinca
- Vlad-Gabriel Dragomirescu DF
- Tudor Fulea D
- Vlad-Luca Georgescu D
- Francesco Iudean DF
- Adrian Mihaluta GK
- Andrei-Radu-Ionut Neamtu
- Andrei Prioteasa D
- Bogdan Remeş DF
- Marius Tic GK
- Levente Vancsik CF
- Albert Vatrai
- Ionut Vranceanu

=== Spain ===
The following is Spain's roster at the 2022 Men's European Water Polo Championship.

Head coach: David Martín

- Unai Aguirre GK
- Alberto Barroso FP
- Alejandro Bustos DF
- Sergi Cabanas DF
- Miguel de Toro CF
- Martin Famera CB
- Álvaro Granados W
- Marc Larumbe DF
- Eduardo Lorrio GK
- Alberto Munárriz DF
- Nikolas Paúl
- Felipe Perrone W
- Bernat Sanahuja AR
- Francisco Valera

== Group D ==
=== Hungary ===
The following is Hungary's roster at the 2022 Men's European Water Polo Championship.

Head coach: Zsolt Varga

- György Ágh
- Dániel Angyal DF
- Gergely Burián
- Gergő Fekete AR
- Szilárd Jansik AR
- Ákos Konarik
- Márton Lévai GK
- Krisztián Manhercz W
- Erik Molnár DF
- Ádám Nagy DF
- Toni Josef Német
- Viktor Vadovics
- Vendel Vigvári
- Soma Vogel GK
- Gergő Zalánki W

=== Israel ===
The following is Israel's roster at the 2022 Men's European Water Polo Championship.

Head coach: Tal Grodman

- Ori Buzaglo CF
- Yahav Fire GK
- Tal Fotin DF
- Tamir Frid W
- Ido Goldschmidt AR
- Tom Grondland
- Ronen Gros D
- Nir Gross
- Gal Haimovich D
- Yuval Klarfeld CB
- Itamar Kolodny W
- Dor Kotrr
- Yoav Rendler W
- Or Schlein D
- Maxim Smirnov GK

=== Serbia ===
The following is Serbia's roster at the 2022 Men's European Water Polo Championship.

Head coach: Dejan Savić

- Stefan Branković
- Lazar Dobožanov GK
- Radomir Drašović
- Dušan Mandić W
- Vasilije Martinović
- Luka Pljevančić DF
- Marko Radulović FP
- Sava Ranđelović CB
- Strahinja Rašović
- Viktor Rašović
- Dimitrije Rističević GK
- Ognjen Stojanović
- Petar Velkić
- Nemanja Vico CF
- Djordje Vučinić

=== Slovenia ===
The following is Slovenia's roster at the 2022 Men's European Water Polo Championship.

Head coach: Krištof Štromajer

- Jure Beton GK
- Marko Blažić
- leksander Cerar CB
- Jan Justin D
- Jaša Kadivec
- Jaša Lah W
- Matej Nastran D
- Aleksandar Paunović W
- Benjamin Popovič D
- Martin Pus D
- Matic Rahne
- Vukasin Stefanović W
- Martin Stele D
- Aljaž Troppan
- Gašper Žurbi GK
