= 2024 Men's European Water Polo Championship squads =

This article shows all participating team squads at the 2024 Men's European Water Polo Championship.

Age and club as of the first day of the tournament, 4 January 2024.

== Group A ==
=== Croatia ===
The squad was announced on 30 December 2023.

Head coach: Ivica Tucak

Name	Date of birth	Pos.	Height	Club
Marko Bijač	12 January 1991 (aged 32)	GK	1.99 m (6 ft 6 in)	(Greece) Olympiacos
Matias Biljaka	20 January 1999 (aged 24)	D	1.93 m (6 ft 4 in)	(Croatia) Jadran Split
Luka Bukić	30 April 1994 (aged 29)	W	1.95 m (6 ft 5 in)	(Croatia) Jadran Split
Rino Burić	5 April 1997 (aged 26)	D	1.97 m (6 ft 6 in)	(Croatia) Jug AO Dubrovnik
Zvonimir Butić	2 November 1998 (aged 25)	W	1.88 m (6 ft 2 in)	(Croatia) Jadran Split
Loren Fatović	16 November 1996 (aged 27)	W	1.85 m (6 ft 1 in)	(Croatia) Jadran Split
Konstantin Kharkov	23 February 1997 (aged 26)	W	1.93 m (6 ft 4 in)	(Croatia) Jadran Split
Filip Kržič	28 August 2000 (aged 23)	D	1.94 m (6 ft 4 in)	(Croatia) Jug AO Dubrovnik
Franko Lazić	25 February 1998 (aged 25)	CF	1.91 m (6 ft 3 in)	(Croatia) Jug AO Dubrovnik
Luka Lončar	26 June 1987 (aged 36)	CF	1.95 m (6 ft 5 in)	(Croatia) Jug AO Dubrovnik
Jerko Marinić Kragić	24 January 1991 (aged 32)	CF	1.91 m (6 ft 3 in)	(Croatia) Jadran Split
Toni Popadić	5 November 1994 (aged 29)	GK	2.05 m (6 ft 9 in)	(Croatia) Jug AO Dubrovnik
Josip Vrlić	25 April 1986 (aged 37)	CF	1.98 m (6 ft 6 in)	(Croatia) Jadran Split
Ante Vukičević	24 February 1993 (aged 30)	D	1.87 m (6 ft 2 in)	(France) CN Marseille
Marko Žuvela	22 December 2001 (aged 22)	W	2.01 m (6 ft 7 in)	(Croatia) Jug AO Dubrovnik

=== France ===
The squad was announced on 2 January 2024.

Head coach: Florian Bruzzo

Name	Date of birth	Pos.	Height	Club
Emil Bjorch	29 August 1987 (aged 36)	CF	2.00 m (6 ft 7 in)	(France) CN Noisy Le Sec
Michaël Bodegas	3 May 1987 (aged 36)	P	1.92 m (6 ft 4 in)	(France) CN Marseille
Alexandre Bouet	5 December 2000 (aged 23)	D	1.86 m (6 ft 1 in)	(France) CN Marseille
Charles Canonne	9 February 1996 (aged 27)	D	1.87 m (6 ft 2 in)	(France) EN Tourcoing
Ugo Crousillat	27 October 1990 (aged 33)	W	1.90 m (6 ft 3 in)	(France) CN Marseille
Hugo Fontani	22 December 1994 (aged 29)	GK	1.91 m (6 ft 3 in)	(France) SN Strasbourg
Arshak Hovhannisyan	24 January 1997 (aged 26)	GK	1.86 m (6 ft 1 in)	(France) CN Marseille
Enzo Khasz	13 August 1993 (aged 30)	D	1.86 m (6 ft 1 in)	(France) Pays d'Aix Natation
Roman Marion-Vernoux	2 January 2000 (aged 24)	W	1.81 m (5 ft 11 in)	(France) CN Marseille
Mehdi Marzouki	26 May 1987 (aged 36)	W	1.92 m (6 ft 4 in)	(France) EN Tourcoing
Enzo Nardon	6 January 2003 (aged 20)	D	1.80 m (5 ft 11 in)	(France) Taverny SN 95
Rémi Saudadier	20 March 1986 (aged 37)	P	1.99 m (6 ft 6 in)	(France) Cn Noisy Le Sec
Pierre-Frédéric Vanpeperstraete	14 May 1992 (aged 31)	CF	1.90 m (6 ft 3 in)	(France) CN Marseille
Thomas Vernoux	21 March 2002 (aged 21)	P	1.82 m (6 ft 0 in)	(France) CN Marseille
Duje Zivkovic	19 December 1990 (aged 33)	W	1.87 m (6 ft 2 in)	(France) EN Tourcoing

=== Montenegro ===
The squad was announced on 31 December 2023.

Head coach: Vladimir Gojković

Name	Date of birth	Pos.	Height	Club
Kanstantsin Averka	16 January 1997 (aged 26)	D	1.95 m (6 ft 5 in)	(Spain) CN Sabadell
Draško Brguljan	27 December 1984 (aged 39)	D	1.95 m (6 ft 5 in)	(Montenegro) VK Primorac Kotor
Dejan Lazović	8 February 1990 (aged 33)	GK	1.98 m (6 ft 6 in)	(France) CN Marseille
Aljoša Mačić	31 October 2000 (aged 23)	P	1.93 m (6 ft 4 in)	(Serbia) VK Šabac
Dušan Matković	1 February 1999 (aged 24)	P	1.97 m (6 ft 6 in)	(France) CN Noisy Le Sec
Marko Mršić	2 January 2003 (aged 21)	P	1.88 m (6 ft 2 in)	(Montenegro) VK Primorac Kotor
Miroslav Perković	15 March 2001 (aged 22)	CF	2.02 m (6 ft 8 in)	(Serbia) VK Novi Beograd
Vlado Popadić	25 April 1996 (aged 27)	W	1.85 m (6 ft 1 in)	(France) SN Strasbourg
Đuro Radović	20 February 1999 (aged 24)	W	1.90 m (6 ft 3 in)	(Croatia) VK Jadran Split
Vasilije Radović	12 May 2003 (aged 20)	D	1.94 m (6 ft 4 in)	(Montenegro) PVK Jadran
Vladan Spaić	18 June 1997 (aged 26)	CF	1.88 m (6 ft 2 in)	(France) CN Marseille
Petar Tešanović	26 November 1998 (aged 25)	GK	1.95 m (6 ft 5 in)	(Italy) AN Brescia
Aleksa Ukropina	28 September 1998 (aged 25)	D	1.96 m (6 ft 5 in)	(Greece) Panionios
Stefan Vidović	8 August 1992 (aged 31)	W	1.92 m (6 ft 4 in)	(Spain) CN Sabadell
Jovan Vujović	20 January 2003 (aged 20)	CF	1.90 m (6 ft 3 in)	(Montenegro) PVK Jadran

=== Spain ===
The squad was announced on 29 December 2023.

Head coach: David Martín

Name	Date of birth	Pos.	Height	Club
Unai Aguirre	14 July 2002 (aged 21)	CF	1.92 m (6 ft 4 in)	(Spain) CN Atlètic-Barceloneta
Alberto Barroso	8 July 1994 (aged 29)	D	1.84 m (6 ft 0 in)	(Spain) CN Sabadell
Unai Biel	19 November 2002 (aged 21)	D	1.93 m (6 ft 4 in)	(Spain) CN Atlètic-Barceloneta
Alejandro Bustos	17 March 1997 (aged 26)	D	1.93 m (6 ft 4 in)	(Spain) CN Atlètic-Barceloneta
Sergi Cabañas	10 February 1996 (aged 27)	P	1.91 m (6 ft 3 in)	(Croatia) VK Jug
Miguel de Toro	16 August 1993 (aged 30)	CF	2.02 m (6 ft 8 in)	(Spain) CN Atlètic-Barceloneta
Biel Gomila	24 February 2006 (aged 17)	CF	1.99 m (6 ft 6 in)	(Spain) CN Catalunya
Álvaro Granados	8 October 1998 (aged 25)	D	1.92 m (6 ft 4 in)	(Serbia) VK Novi Beograd
Marc Larumbe	30 May 1994 (aged 29)	D	1.93 m (6 ft 4 in)	(Spain) CN Atlètic-Barceloneta
Eduardo Lorrio	25 September 1993 (aged 30)	GK	1.93 m (6 ft 4 in)	(Spain) CN Sabadell
Blai Mallarach	21 August 1987 (aged 36)	D	1.87 m (6 ft 2 in)	(Spain) CN Sabadell
Alberto Munárriz	19 May 1994 (aged 29)	D	1.97 m (6 ft 6 in)	(Spain) CN Atlètic-Barceloneta
Felipe Perrone	27 February 1986 (aged 37)	D	1.83 m (6 ft 0 in)	(Spain) CN Atlètic-Barceloneta
Bernat Sanahuja	21 October 2000 (aged 23)	D	1.92 m (6 ft 4 in)	(Spain) CN Atlètic-Barceloneta
Roger Tahull	11 May 1997 (aged 26)	CF	1.96 m (6 ft 5 in)	(Spain) CN Atlètic-Barceloneta

== Group B ==
=== Georgia ===
Head coach: Dejan Stanojević

Name	Date of birth	Pos.	Height	Club
Sandro Adeishvili	6 September 1999 (aged 24)	CF	1.93 m (6 ft 4 in)	(Serbia) VK Radnički Kragujevac
Besarion Akhvlediani	28 January 2004 (aged 19)	D	1.85 m (6 ft 1 in)	(Georgia (country)) Dinamo Tbilisi
Andria Bitadze	17 May 1997 (aged 26)	CF	2.03 m (6 ft 8 in)	(Italy) CC Ortigia
Valiko Dadvani	7 August 2002 (aged 21)	W	1.94 m (6 ft 4 in)	(Serbia) VK Radnički Kragujevac
Artsiom Dzikhtsiarenka	14 May 1999 (aged 24)	D	2.03 m (6 ft 8 in)	(Georgia (country)) Dinamo Tbilisi
Revaz Imanishvili	9 August 1997 (aged 26)	D	1.86 m (6 ft 1 in)	(Georgia (country)) Dinamo Tbilisi
Khvicha Jakhaia	16 September 1996 (aged 27)	P	1.96 m (6 ft 5 in)	(Georgia (country)) Dinamo Tbilisi
Marko Jelaca	15 December 1982 (aged 41)	P	2.02 m (6 ft 8 in)	(Lithuania) EVK Žaibas
Beka Kapanadze	20 January 1993 (aged 30)	GK	2.01 m (6 ft 7 in)	(Georgia (country)) Dinamo Tbilisi
Giorgi Magrakvelidze	21 January 1998 (aged 25)	D	1.88 m (6 ft 2 in)	(Georgia (country)) Dinamo Tbilisi
Stefan Pjesivac	12 December 1996 (aged 27)	CF	1.91 m (6 ft 3 in)	(Georgia (country)) Dinamo Tbilisi
Irakli Razmadze	4 April 1997 (aged 26)	GK	1.90 m (6 ft 3 in)	(Georgia (country)) Dinamo Tbilisi
Nika Shushiashvili	18 April 1999 (aged 24)	D	1.85 m (6 ft 1 in)	(Greece) GS Apollon Smyrnis
Saba Tkeshelashvili	14 January 2004 (aged 19)	P	1.95 m (6 ft 5 in)	(Georgia (country)) Dinamo Tbilisi
Dušan Vasić	17 July 1993 (aged 30)	D	1.93 m (6 ft 4 in)	(Serbia) VK Crvena zvezda

=== Greece ===
The squad was announced on 3 January 2024.

Head coach: Theodoros Vlachos
