= Water polo at the 1994 World Aquatics Championships =

The water polo events at the 1994 World Aquatics Championships were held from 1 to 11 September 1994, in Rome, Italy.

== Medal summary ==
=== Medal table ===
Rank	Nation	Gold	Silver	Bronze	Total
1	Italy (ITA)	1	0	1	2
2	Hungary (HUN)	1	0	0	1
3	Netherlands (NED)	0	1	0	1
3	Spain (ESP)	0	1	0	1
5	Russia (RUS)	0	0	1	1
Totals (5 entries)		2	2	2	6

=== Medalists ===
Event	Gold	Silver	Bronze
Men	Italy Carlo Silipo; Amedeo Pomilio; Roberto Calcaterra; Gianni Averaimo; Alessandro Bovo; Mario Fiorillo; Francesco Porzio; Ferdinando Gandolfi; Massimiliano Ferretti; Sandro Campagna; Pino Porzio; Marco D'Altrui; Francesco Attolico Head coach: Ratko Rudić	Spain Jorge Payá; Manuel Silvestre; Gabriel Hernández; Sergi Pedrerol; Jesús Rollán; Manuel Estiarte (c); Pedro García; Jordi Sans; Salvador Gómez; Miki Oca; Gustavo Marcos; Daniel Ballart; Josep Picó Head coach: Juan Jané	Russia Aleksandr Ogorodnikov; Sergey Yevstigneyev; Dmitri Dugin; Nikolay Maksimov; Aleksandr Yeryshov; Dmitry Apanasenko; Serghei Marcoci; Nikolay Kozlov; Sergey Ivlev; Dmitry Gorshkov; Yuriy Smoloviy; Maxim Apanasenko; Sergey Garbuzov Head coach: Aleksandr Kabanov
Women	Hungary Katalin Dancsa; Andrea Eke; Zsuzsanna Huff; Zsuzsa Kertész; Ildikó Kuna; Irén Rafael; Katalin Rédei; Edit Sipos; Mercédesz Stieber; Orsolya Szalkay; Krisztina Szremkó; Gabriella Tóth; Noémi Tóth Head coach: Gyula Tóth	Netherlands Karla van der Boon (goal); Hellen Boering (goal); Ellen Bast; Gillian van den Berg; Edmée Hiemstra; Stella Kriekaard; Karin Kuipers; Ingrid Leijendekker; Alice Lindhout; Sandra Scherrenburg; Rianne Schram; Janny Spijker; Hedda Verdam Head coach: Kees van Hardeveld.	Italy Nicoletta Abbate; Carmela Allucci; Cristina Consoli; Francesca Conti; Antonella Di Giacinto; Melania Grego; Stefania Lariucci; Giusi Malato; Martina Miceli; Paola Sabbatini; Oriana Di Siena; Monica Vaillant; Milena Virzì
