= Sergey Ivlev =

Sergey Ivlev can refer to:

- Sergey Ivlev (badminton), Russian badminton player
- Sergey Ivlev (water polo) (born 1969), Russian water polo player
