= Siniša Belamarić =

Croatian water polo player

Personal information
- Nationality: Croatian
- Born: 18 February 1947 (age 79) Šibenik, Yugoslavia

Sport
- Sport: Water polo
Medal record
Representing Yugoslavia
World Championships
Bronze medal – third place	1973 Belgrade	Team competition
Bronze medal – third place	1978 West Berlin	Team competition
European Championships
Silver medal – second place	1977 Jönköping	Team competition
Bronze medal – third place	1970 Barcelona	Team competition
Bronze medal – third place	1974 Vienna	Team competition

Siniša Belamarić (born 18 February 1947) is a Croatian water polo player. He competed at the 1972 Summer Olympics and the 1976 Summer Olympics.

== See also ==
- List of World Aquatics Championships medalists in water polo
