= Manuel Silvestre =

Spanish water polo player (born 1965)

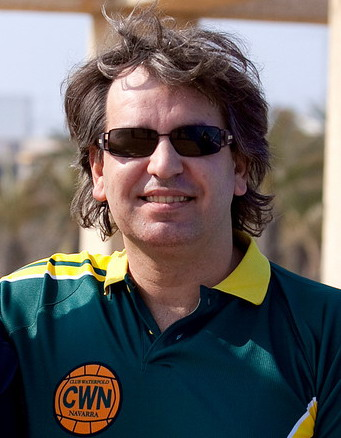

Personal information
- Born: June 2, 1965 (age 61) Barcelona, Spain

Sport
- Sport: Water polo
Medal record
Representing Spain
Olympic Games
Silver medal – second place	1992 Barcelona	Team competition
World Championships
Silver medal – second place	1991 Perth	Team competition
Silver medal – second place	1994 Rome	Team competition

Manuel Silvestre Sánchez (born June 2, 1965) is a former water polo player from Spain, who was a member of the national team that won the silver medal near his home town, at the 1992 Summer Olympics in Barcelona, Spain.

== See also ==
- Spain men's Olympic water polo team records and statistics
- List of Olympic medalists in water polo (men)
- List of men's Olympic water polo tournament goalkeepers
- List of World Aquatics Championships medalists in water polo
