= Josep Picó =

Spanish water polo player (born 1964)

Personal information
- Born: 12 April 1964 (age 62) Sabadell, Catalonia, Spain

Sport
- Sport: Water polo
Medal record
Representing Spain
Olympic Games
Silver medal – second place	1992 Barcelona	Team competition
World Championships
Silver medal – second place	1991 Perth	Team competition
Silver medal – second place	1994 Rome	Team competition
European Championships
Silver medal – second place	1991 Athens	Team competition
Bronze medal – third place	1993 Sheffield	Team competition

Josep Picó Lladó (born 12 April 1964) is a former water polo player from Spain, who was a member of the national team that won the silver medal near his home town, at the 1992 Summer Olympics in Barcelona, Spain.

== See also ==
- List of Olympic medalists in water polo (men)
- List of World Aquatics Championships medalists in water polo
