= Sergey Yevstigneyev =

Russian water polo player

Personal information
- Born: Сергей Александрович Евстигнеев; 17 January 1974 (age 52) Moscow, Russian SFSR, Soviet Union
- Height: 1.90 m (6 ft 3 in)
- Weight: 89 kg (196 lb)

Sport
- Sport: Water polo
- Club: Dynamo Moscow
Medal record
Representing Russia
World Championships
Bronze medal – third place	1994 Rome	Team
European Championships
Bronze medal – third place	1997 Sevilla	Team

Sergey Aleksandrovich Yevstigneyev (Russian: Сергей Александрович Евстигнеев; born 17 January 1974) is a water polo coach and retired Russian water polo player. He competed at the 1996 Summer Olympics and finished in fifth place with the Russian team, contributing 4 goals in 8 matches.

== Career ==
Yevstigneyev started training in water polo in 1983, and between 1992 and 1999 was a member of the national team, winning bronze medals at the 1994 world and 1997 European championships. In 1994 he met his future wife, Olympic synchronized swimmer Olga Brusnikina. They married in September 2001 and moved to Italy, where Yevstigneyev played for a local team and Brusnikina coached synchronized swimming. In August 2006 Brusnikina gave birth to a son, Iliya.

As of 2015 Yevstigneyev was living in Moscow and coaching the Russian men's water polo team.

== See also ==
- List of World Aquatics Championships medalists in water polo
