= Unai Biel =

Spanish water polo player (born 2002)

Personal information
- Full name: Unai Biel Lara
- Nationality: Spanish
- Born: 19 November 2002 (age 23) Barcelona, Spain
- Height: 193 cm (6 ft 4 in)
Medal record
Men's water polo
Representing Spain
World Championships
Gold medal – first place	2025 Singapore	Team
Bronze medal – third place	2024 Doha	Team
European Championships
Gold medal – first place	2024 Zagreb	Team

Unai Biel Lara (Note: In this Spanish name, the first or paternal surname is Biel and the second or maternal family name is Lara.) (born 19 November 2002) is a Spanish water polo player. He represented Spain at the 2024 Summer Olympics.
