= Roger Tahull =

Spanish water polo player (born 1997)

Personal information
- Full name: Roger Tahull i Compte
- Born: 11 May 1997 (age 29) Barcelona, Spain
- Height: 1.95 m (6 ft 5 in)
- Weight: 104 kg (229 lb)

Sport
- Sport: Water polo
- Club: CN Barcelona
Medal record
Men's water polo
Representing Spain
World Championships
Gold medal – first place	2022 Budapest	Team
Gold medal – first place	2025 Singapore	Team
Bronze medal – third place	2023 Fukuoka	Team
Bronze medal – third place	2024 Doha	Team
European Championship
Gold medal – first place	2024 Zagreb	Team
Silver medal – second place	2018 Barcelona	Team
Silver medal – second place	2020 Budapest	Team
Bronze medal – third place	2022 Split	Team
World Cup
Gold medal – first place	2023 Los Angeles

Roger Tahull i Compte (Note: In this Catalan name, the first or paternal surname is Tahull and the second or maternal family name is Compte; both are generally joined by the conjunction "i".) (born 11 May 1997) is a Spanish water polo player. He was part of the Spanish team at the 2016 Summer Olympics, where the team finished in seventh place.

== See also ==
- List of World Aquatics Championships medalists in water polo
