= Blai Mallarach =

Spanish water polo player (born 1987)

Personal information
- Full name: Blai Mallarach Güell
- Nationality: Spanish
- Born: 21 August 1987 (age 39) Olot, Spain
- Height: 194 cm (76 in)
- Weight: 108 kg (238 lb)

Sport
- Sport: Water polo
- Handedness: Left
- Position: Right Driv/ Right Wing
- Current club: CN Atlètic-Barceloneta
- Number: 11

Senior clubs
- Years: Team
- 2003–2011: CN Barcelona
- 2011–2012: Mladost
- 2012–2016: Olympiacos
- 2016–present: CN Atlètic-Barceloneta
National team
- Years: Team
- 2006–2016: Spain
Medal record
Men's water polo
Representing Spain
World Championships
Gold medal – first place	2022 Budapest	Team
Silver medal – second place	2009 Rome	Team
Bronze medal – third place	2023 Fukuoka	Team
Bronze medal – third place	2024 Doha	Team
European Championship
Gold medal – first place	2024 Zagreb	Team
Silver medal – second place	2018 Barcelona	Team
Silver medal – second place	2020 Budapest	Team
Bronze medal – third place	2006 Belgrade	Team
World Cup
Gold medal – first place	2023 Los Angeles

Blai Mallarach Güell (Note: In this Spanish name, the first or paternal surname is Mallarach and the second or maternal family name is Güell.) (born 21 August 1987) is a Spanish water polo player. At the 2012 Summer Olympics, he competed for the Spain men's national water polo team in the men's event. He is 6 ft 2 inches tall. He played for Spanish powerhouse CN Atlètic-Barceloneta.

== Honours ==
CN Barcelona

- LEN Euro Cup: 2003–04
- Spanish Championship: 2003–04, 2004–05
- Copa del Rey: 2002–03, 2010–11

Mladost

- Croatian Cup: 2011–12

Olympiacos

- LEN Champions League runners-up: 2015–16
- Greek Championship: 2012–13, 2013–14, 2014–15, 2015–16
- Greek Cup: 2012–13, 2013–14, 2014–15, 2015–16

CN Atlètic-Barceloneta

- Spanish Championship: 2016–17, 2017–18, 2018–19, 2019–20, 2020–21, 2021–22
- Copa del Rey: 2016–17, 2017–18, 2018–19, 2019–20, 2020–21, 2021–22
- Supercopa de España: 2018, 2019

== See also ==
- List of World Aquatics Championships medalists in water polo
