= Miroslav Perković =

Montenegrin water polo player (born 2001)

Personal information
- Nationality: Montenegrin
- Born: 15 March 2001 (age 25) Kotor, FR Yugoslavia
- Height: 2.03 m (6 ft 8 in)

Sport
- Sport: Water polo
- Club: Novi Beograd

Miroslav Perković (born 15 March 2001) is a Montenegrin water polo player. He competed in the 2020 Summer Olympics.
