= Martin Faměra =

Spanish water polo player (born 1988)

Martín Famera
Personal information
- Full name: Martín Famera Kopencova
- Nationality: Spanish
- Born: Martin Faměra; 4 November 1988 (age 37) Vimperk, Czechoslovakia
- Height: 2.00 m (6 ft 7 in)
- Weight: 107 kg (236 lb)

Sport
- Sport: Water polo

Senior clubs
- Years: Team
- –: FEZKO Strakonice
- –: ČH Hornets Košice
- –: Olympic Nice
- –: Wasserfreunde Spandau 04
- –: CN Atlètic-Barceloneta
National team
- Years: Team
- –2009: Czech Republic
- 2010–2016: Slovakia
- 2020–: Spain
Medal record
Representing Spain
World Championships
Gold medal – first place	2022 Budapest	Team
Bronze medal – third place	2023 Fukuoka	Team
Bronze medal – third place	2024 Doha	Team
European Championships
Bronze medal – third place	2022 Split	Team

Martín Famera Kopencova (Note: In this Spanish name, the first or paternal surname is Famera and the second or maternal family name is Kopencova.) (born 4 November 1988) is a water polo player. Born in the Czech Republic (then part of Czechoslovakia), he represents Spain at international level. Previously, he played for his country of birth and Slovakia men's national teams.

He represented Slovakia in 2016 Men's European Water Polo Championship and Spain in the 2020 Summer Olympics tournament.
