= Rémi Saudadier =

French water polo player (born 1986)

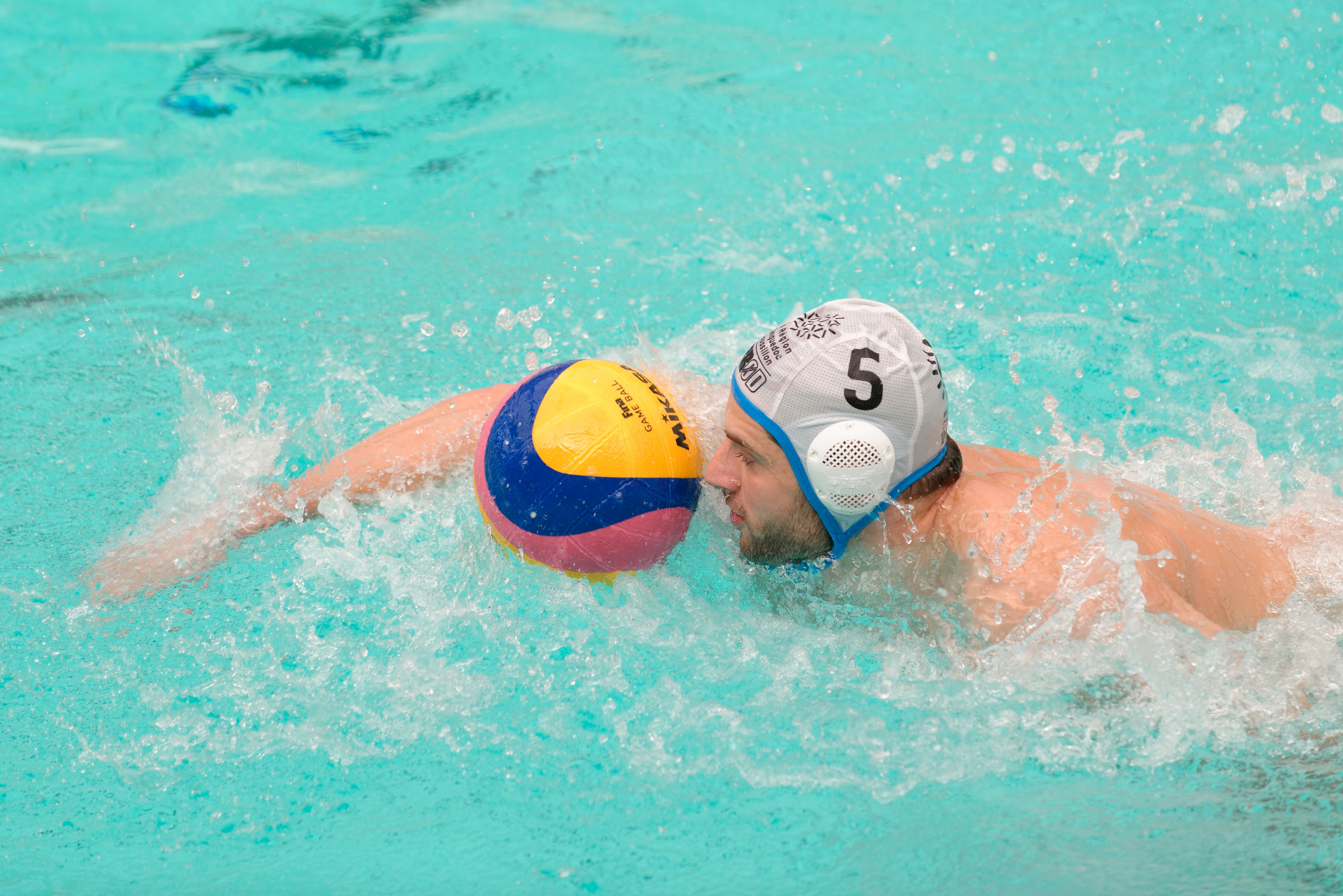
- Saudadier in 2014

Personal information
- Born: 20 March 1986 (age 40) Dijon, France
- Height: 198 cm (6 ft 6 in)
- Weight: 95 kg (209 lb)

Sport
- Sport: Water polo
- Club: Spandau 04

Rémi Saudadier (born 20 March 1986) is a water polo player from France. He was part of the French team at the 2016 Summer Olympics, where the team was eliminated in the group stage.
