= Florian Bruzzo =

French water polo player and coach

Personal information
- Born: June 1, 1982 (age 43) Montreuil-sous-Bois, France

Sport
- Sport: Water polo

Florian Bruzzo (born 1 June 1982) is a French water polo coach. He was the head coach of the France men's national water polo team at the 2016 Summer Olympics.
