= Unai Aguirre =

Spanish water polo player (born 2002)

Personal information
- Full name: Unai Aguirre Rubio
- Nationality: Spanish
- Born: 14 July 2002 (age 24) Barcelona, Spain
- Height: 1.92 m (6 ft 4 in)
- Weight: 85 kg (187 lb)

Sport
- Sport: Water polo
Medal record
World Championships
Gold medal – first place	2022 Budapest	Team
Gold medal – first place	2025 Singapore	Team
Bronze medal – third place	2023 Fukuoka	Team
Bronze medal – third place	2024 Doha	Team
European Championships
Gold medal – first place	2024 Zagreb	Team
Bronze medal – third place	2022 Split	Team
World Cup
Gold medal – first place	2023 Los Angeles

Unai Aguirre Rubio (Note: In this Spanish name, the first or paternal surname is Aguirre and the second or maternal family name is Rubio.) (born 14 July 2002) is a Spanish water polo goalkeeper who plays for CN Atlètic-Barceloneta and the Spain men's national water polo team. He is generally considered one of the best water-polo goalkeepers in the world.

== Career ==
Aguirre debuted internationally for Spain at the 2020 Summer Olympics in Tokyo, serving as a backup goalkeeper. Since then, he has become Spain’s first-choice goalkeeper, leading them to multiple international titles.

At the 2022 World Aquatics Championships in Budapest, Aguirre helped Spain claim the gold medal in a penalty shootout against Italy. He was named the tournament's Best Goalkeeper, becoming the first Spanish male player to receive this honor. In 2023, Aguirre repeated his success at the 2023 Men's Water Polo World Cup, again earning the Best Goalkeeper award after making 16 saves in the final against Greece.

At the 2024 European Water Polo Championship in Zagreb, Aguirre led Spain to their first European title since 2020. His performance in the semifinal against Italy – which included several acrobatic saves and a critical penalty block – was described as "an exhibition of reflexes and composure." Notably, Aguirre scored a rare goalkeeper goal from his own goal line during a group-stage match against Montenegro at the 2024 European Championship, catching the opposing goalkeeper off guard.

== Playing style ==
Aguirre is celebrated for his agility, mental toughness, and ability to perform under pressure. He has been praised for his "spectacular foot saves" and vocal leadership in the pool.
