= Sergey Ivlev (water polo) =

Russian water polo player

Personal information
- Nationality: Russian
- Born: 14 February 1969 (age 57) Moscow, Soviet Union

Sport
- Sport: Water polo
Medal record
Representing Russia
World Championships
| Bronze medal – third place | 1994 Rome | Team competition |
European Championships
| Bronze medal – third place | 1991 Athens | Team competition |

Sergey Ivlev (born 14 February 1969) is a Russian water polo player. He competed in the men's tournament at the 1996 Summer Olympics.

== See also ==
- List of World Aquatics Championships medalists in water polo
