= David Martín (water polo) =

Spanish water polo player (born 1977)

Personal information
- Nationality: Spanish
- Born: 2 January 1977 (age 49) Barcelona, Spain
- Height: 1.77 m (5 ft 10 in)
- Weight: 77 kg (170 lb)

Sport
- Sport: Water polo
Medal record
Representing Spain
World Championships
| Silver medal – second place | 2009 Rome | Team |
| Bronze medal – third place | 2007 Melbourne | Team |
European Championship
| Bronze medal – third place | 2006 Belgrade | Team |

David Martín Lozano (born 2 January 1977) is a Spanish water polo player who competed in the 2008 and 2012 Summer Olympics.

== See also ==
- List of World Aquatics Championships medalists in water polo
