= Alberto Munárriz =

Spanish water polo player (born 1994)

Personal information
- Full name: Alberto Munárriz Egaña
- Born: 19 May 1994 (age 32) Pamplona, Spain
- Height: 197 cm (6 ft 6 in)
- Weight: 105 kg (231 lb)

Sport
- Sport: Water polo
- Club: CN Atlètic-Barceloneta
Medal record
Men's water polo
Representing Spain
World Championships
Gold medal – first place	2022 Budapest	Team
Gold medal – first place	2025 Singapore	Team
Bronze medal – third place	2023 Fukuoka	Team
Bronze medal – third place	2024 Doha	Team
European Championship
Gold medal – first place	2024 Zagreb	Team
Silver medal – second place	2018 Barcelona	Team
Silver medal – second place	2020 Budapest	Team
Bronze medal – third place	2022 Split	Team
World Cup
Gold medal – first place	2023 Los Angeles

Alberto Munárriz Egaña (Note: In this Spanish name, the first or paternal surname is Munarriz and the second or maternal family name is Egaña.) (born 19 May 1994) is a Spanish water polo player. He was part of the Spanish team at the 2016 Summer Olympics, where the team finished in seventh place.

== See also ==
- List of World Aquatics Championships medalists in water polo
