= Matias Biljaka =

Croatian water polo player (born 1999)

Personal information
- Nationality: Austrian/Croatian
- Born: 20 January 1999 (age 27) Vienna, Austria
- Height: 199 cm (78 in)

Sport
- Sport: Water polo
- Current club: Jadran Split

Senior clubs
- Years: Team
- 2017–2022: Mladost Zagreb
- 2022–2023: Jug Dubrovnik
- 2023–: Jadran Split
National team
- Years: Team
- 2022–: Croatia
Medal record
Olympic Games
Silver medal – second place	2024 Paris	Team
World Aquatics Championships
Gold medal – first place	2024 Doha	Team
European Water Polo Championships
Gold medal – first place	2022 Split	Team
Silver medal – second place	2024 Zagreb	Team

Matias Biljaka (born 20 January 1999) is an Austrian-born Croatian water polo player. He represented Croatia at the 2024 Summer Olympics.
