= Erik Molnár (water polo) =

Hungarian water polo player (born 2003)

Personal information
- Nationality: Hungarian
- Born: 24 June 2003 (age 23) Budapest, Hungary
- Height: 200 cm (6 ft 7 in)
Medal record
World Championship
Silver medal – second place	2025 Singapore	Team

Erik Molnár (born 24 June 2003) is a Hungarian water polo player. He represented Hungary at the 2024 Summer Olympics.
