= Alejandro Bustos =

Spanish water polo player (born 1997)

Personal information
- Full name: Alejandro Bustos Sánchez
- Born: 17 March 1997 (age 29) Madrid, Spain
- Height: 1.93 m (6 ft 4 in)
- Weight: 106 kg (234 lb)

Sport
- Country: Spain
- Sport: Water polo
Medal record
World Championships
Gold medal – first place	2022 Budapest	Team
Gold medal – first place	2025 Singapore	Team
Bronze medal – third place	2023 Fukuoka	Team
Bronze medal – third place	2024 Doha	Team
European Championships
Gold medal – first place	2024 Zagreb	Team
Silver medal – second place	2018 Barcelona	Team
Silver medal – second place	2020 Budapest	Team
Bronze medal – third place	2022 Split	Team
World Cup
Gold medal – first place	2023 Los Angeles

Alejandro Bustos Sánchez (Note: In this Spanish name, the first or paternal surname is Bustos and the second or maternal family name is Sánchez.) (born 17 March 1997) is a Spanish water polo player. He competed in the 2020 Summer Olympics.
