= Álvaro Granados =

Spanish water polo player (born 1998)

Personal information
- Full name: Álvaro Granados Ortega
- Born: 8 October 1998 (age 28) Terrassa, Spain
- Height: 1.92 m (6 ft 4 in)
- Weight: 85 kg (187 lb)

Sport
- Sport: Water polo
- Handedness: Right
- Position: Drive
- Current club: Pro Recco

Senior clubs
- Years: Team
- 2017–2022: CN Atlètic-Barceloneta
- 2022–2024: Novi Beograd
- 2024–2025: CN Atlètic-Barceloneta
- 2025-: Pro Recco
Medal record
Men's water polo
Representing Spain
World Championship
Gold medal – first place	2022 Budapest	Team
Gold medal – first place	2025 Singapore	Team
Silver medal – second place	2019 Gwangju	Team
Bronze medal – third place	2023 Fukuoka	Team
Bronze medal – third place	2024 Doha	Team
European Championship
Gold medal – first place	2024 Zagreb	Team
Silver medal – second place	2018 Barcelona	Team
Silver medal – second place	2020 Budapest	Team
Bronze medal – third place	2022 Split	Team
FINA World League
Bronze medal – third place	2018 Budapest
World Cup
Gold medal – first place	2025 World Aquatics Men’s Waterpolo World Cup
World Cup
Gold medal – first place	2023 Los Angeles
European Games
Silver medal – second place	2015 Baku	Team

Álvaro Granados Ortega (Note: In this Spanish name, the first or paternal surname is Granados and the second or maternal family name is Ortega.) (born 8 October 1998) is a Spanish professional water polo player. He competed in the 2020 Summer Olympics.

== Honours ==
Atlètic-Barceloneta

- Spanish Championship: 2017–18, 2018–19, 2019–20, 2020–21, 2021–22
- Copa del Rey: 2018, 2019, 2020, 2021, 2022
- Supercopa de España: 2017, 2018, 2019

Novi Beograd

- LEN Champions League runners-up: 2022–23
- Adriatic League: 2023–24
- Serbian Championship: 2022–23
- Serbian Cup: 2023–24

=== Individual ===
- Member of the World Team by total-waterpolo: 2022, 2023
- Summer Olympics Best Left Drive of the Tournament: 2024
- World Championship Team of the Tournament: 2022, 2024
- European Championship Top Scorer: 2024
- LEN Champions League Top Scorer: 2022–23, 2023–24
- LEN Champions League Left Winger of the Year: 2021–22, 2022–23
- LEN Champions League Left Driver of the Year: 2023–24, 2024–25
- Adriatic League MVP: 2023–24
- Adriatic League Top Scorer: 2023–24
- Adriatic League Left Winger of the Year: 2022–23, 2023–24
- Spanish Championship MVP: 2021–22
- Spanish Championship Top Scorer: 2021–22
- Spanish Championship Left Winger of the Year: 2017–18, 2018–19, 2019–20, 2020–21, 2021–
- Serbian Championship MVP: 2022–23
- Serbian Championship Top Scorer: 2022–23
- Serbian Championship Left Winger of the Year: 2022–23
- Spanish Water Polo Player of the Year: 2023
