= Miguel de Toro =

Spanish water polo player (born 1993)

Personal information
- Full name: Miguel de Toro Domínguez
- Born: 16 August 1993 (age 32) Seville, Spain
- Height: 2.02 m (6 ft 8 in)
- Weight: 115 kg (254 lb)

Sport
- Country: Spain
- Sport: Water polo
Medal record
World Championships
Gold medal – first place	2022 Budapest	Team
Gold medal – first place	2025 Singapore	Team
Bronze medal – third place	2023 Fukuoka	Team
Bronze medal – third place	2024 Doha	Team
European Championships
Gold medal – first place	2024 Zagreb	Team
Silver medal – second place	2018 Barcelona	Team
Silver medal – second place	2020 Budapest	Team
Bronze medal – third place	2022 Split	Team
World Cup
Gold medal – first place	2023 Los Angeles

Miguel de Toro Domínguez (Note: In this Spanish name, the first or paternal surname is De Toro and the second or maternal family name is Domínguez.) (born 16 August 1993) is a Spanish water polo player. He competed in the 2020 Summer Olympics.
