= Eduardo Lorrio =

Spanish water polo player (born 1993)

Personal information
- Full name: Eduardo Lorrio Béjar
- Nationality: Spanish
- Born: 25 September 1993 (age 32) Madrid, Spain
- Height: 193 cm (6 ft 4 in)
Medal record
Men's water polo
Representing Spain
World Championships
Gold medal – first place	2025 Singapore	Team
Bronze medal – third place	2024 Doha	Team
European Championships
Gold medal – first place	2024 Zagreb	Team
Silver medal – second place	2018 Barcelona	Team
Silver medal – second place	2020 Budapest	Team
Bronze medal – third place	2022 Split	Team

Eduardo Lorrio Béjar (Note: In this Spanish name, the first or paternal surname is Lorrio and the second or maternal family name is Béjar.) (born 25 September 1993) is a Spanish water polo player. He represented Spain at the 2024 Summer Olympics.
