= Water polo at the 2023 World Aquatics Championships – Men's team rosters =

This article shows the roster of all participating teams at the men's water polo tournament at the 2023 World Aquatics Championships.

== Group A ==
=== Australia ===
The following is the Australian roster.

Head coach: Timothy Hamill

- 1 Nick Porter GK
- 2 Angus Lambie FP
- 3 George Ford FP
- 4 Charlie Negus FP
- 5 Nathan Power FP
- 6 Lachlan Edwards FP
- 7 Luke Pavillard FP
- 8 Matthew Byrnes FP
- 9 Marcus Berehulak FP
- 10 Timothy Putt FP
- 11 Chaz Poot FP
- 12 Blake Edwards FP
- 13 John Hedges GK
- Reilly Townsend FP
- Samuel Slobodien FP

=== Greece ===
The following is the Greek roster.

Head coach: Theodoros Vlachos

- 1 Emmanouil Zerdevas GK
- 2 Konstantinos Genidounias FP
- 3 Dimitrios Skoumpakis FP
- 4 Efstathios Kalogeropoulos FP
- 5 Ioannis Fountoulis FP
- 6 Alexandros Papanastasiou FP
- 7 Georgios Dervisis FP
- 8 Stylianos Argyropoulos FP
- 9 Dimitrios Nikolaidis FP
- 10 Konstantinos Kakaris FP
- 11 Ioannis Alafragkis FP
- 12 Konstantinos Gkiouvetsis FP
- 13 Panagiotis Tzortzatos GK
- Nikolaos Gkillas FP
- Aristeidis Chalyvopoulos FP

=== Kazakhstan ===
The following is the Kazakh roster.

Head coach: Nebojša Obradović

- 1 Temirlan Balfanbayev GK
- 2 Eduard Tsoy FP
- 3 Yegor Berbelyuk FP
- 4 Dushan Markovich FP
- 5 Danil Artyukh FP
- 6 Alexey Shmider FP
- 7 Murat Shakenov FP
- 8 Srđan Vuksanović FP
- 9 Ruslan Akhmetov FP
- 10 Mikhail Ruday FP
- 11 Olzhas Kanysh FP
- 12 Sultan Shonzhigitov FP
- 13 Daniil Matolinets GK
- Maxim Lamayev FP
- Yegor Beloussev FP

=== United States ===
The following is the American roster.

Head coach: Dejan Udovičić

- 1 Adrian Weinberg GK
- 2 Johnny Hooper FP
- 3 Tommy Gruwell FP
- 4 Tyler Abramson FP
- 5 Hannes Daube FP
- 6 Luca Cupido FP
- 7 Ben Hallock FP
- 8 Dylan Woodhead FP
- 9 Alex Bowen FP
- 10 Chase Dodd FP
- 11 Ryder Dodd FP
- 12 Max Irving FP
- 13 Drew Holland GK
- Marko Vavic FP
- Quinn Woodhead FP

== Group B ==
=== Canada ===
The following is the Canadian roster.

Head coach: Patrick Oaten

- 1 Milan Radenovic GK
- 2 Gaelan Patterson FP
- 3 Bogdan Djerkovic FP
- 4 Nicolas Constantin-Bicari FP
- 5 Matt Halajian FP
- 6 Jérémie Blanchard FP
- 7 Nikos Gerakoudis FP
- 8 Jeremie Cote FP
- 9 Aleksa Gardijan FP
- 10 Aria Soleimanipak FP
- 11 David Lapins FP
- 12 Léo Hachem FP
- 13 Brody McKnight GK
- Reuel D'Souza FP

=== China ===
The following is the Chinese roster.

Head coach: Petar Porobić

- 1 Wu Honghui GK
- 2 Hu Zhangxin FP
- 3 Chu Chenghao FP
- 4 Peng Jiahao FP
- 5 Zhang Jinpeng FP
- 6 Xie Zekai FP
- 7 Chen Zhongxian FP
- 8 Chen Rui FP
- 9 Chen Yimin FP
- 10 Liu Yu FP
- 11 Zhang Chufeng FP
- 12 Shen Dingsong FP
- 13 Liang Zhiwei GK
- Li Lun FP

=== France ===
The following is the French roster.

Head coach: Florian Bruzzo

- 1 Clément Dubois GK
- 2 Rémi Saudadier FP
- 3 Ugo Crousillat FP
- 4 Alexandre Bouet FP
- 5 Enzo Khasz FP
- 6 Thomas Vernoux FP
- 7 Duje Živković FP
- 8 Emil Bjorch FP
- 9 Mehdi Marzouki FP
- 10 Charles Canonne FP
- 11 Pierre-Frédéric Vanpeperstraete FP
- 12 Andrea De Nardi FP
- 13 Hugo Fontani GK
- Mathias Bachelier FP
- Denis Do Carmo FP

=== Italy ===
The following is the Italian roster.

Head coach: Sandro Campagna

- 1 Marco Del Lungo GK
- 2 Francesco Di Fulvio FP
- 3 Luca Damonte FP
- 4 Luca Marziali FP
- 5 Andrea Fondelli FP
- 6 Giacomo Cannella FP
- 7 Vincenzo Renzuto FP
- 8 Gonzalo Echenique FP
- 9 Nicholas Presciutti FP
- 10 Lorenzo Bruni FP
- 11 Edoardo Di Somma FP
- 12 Vincenzo Dolce FP
- 13 Gianmarco Nicosia GK
- Alessandro Velotto FP
- Francesco Condemi FP

== Group C ==
=== Argentina ===
The following is the Argentine roster.

Head coach: Juan Pablo Giri

- 1 Diego Malnero GK
- 2 Ramiro Veich FP
- 3 Tomás Galimberti FP
- 4 Tomás Tilatti FP
- 5 Nahuel Leona FP
- 6 Tomás Echenique FP
- 7 Guido Martino FP
- 8 Eduardo Bonomo FP
- 9 Carlos Camnasio FP
- 10 Esteban Corsi FP
- 11 Guido Poggi FP
- 12 Teo Soler FP
- 13 Octavio Salas GK

=== Croatia ===
The following is the Croatian roster.

Head coach: Ivica Tucak

- 1 Marko Bijač GK
- 2 Rino Burić FP
- 3 Marino Čagalj FP
- 4 Ivan Krapić FP
- 5 Franko Lazić FP
- 6 Luka Bukić FP
- 7 Ante Vukičević FP
- 8 Marko Žuvela FP
- 9 Jerko Marinić Kragić FP
- 10 Josip Vrlić FP
- 11 Andrija Bašić FP
- 12 Konstantin Kharkov FP
- 13 Toni Popadić GK
- Filip Kržić FP
- Zvonimir Butić FP

=== Hungary ===
The following is the Hungarian roster.

Head coach: Zsolt Varga

- 1 Márton Lévai GK
- 2 Dániel Angyal FP
- 3 Krisztián Manhercz FP
- 4 Zoltán Pohl FP
- 5 Márton Vámos FP
- 6 Ádám Nagy FP
- 7 Gergő Zalánki FP
- 8 Gergő Fekete FP
- 9 Toni Német FP
- 10 Dénes Varga FP
- 11 Szilárd Jansik FP
- 12 Vendel Vigvári FP
- 13 Soma Vogel GK
- Erik Molnár FP
- Vince Vigvári FP

=== Japan ===
The following is the Japanese roster.

Head coach: Yoshinori Shiota

- 1 Katsuyuki Tanamura GK
- 2 Seiya Adachi FP
- 3 Taiyo Watanabe FP
- 4 Daichi Ogihara FP
- 5 Ikkei Nitta FP
- 6 Toi Suzuki FP
- 7 Kiyomu Date FP
- 8 Mitsuru Takata FP
- 9 Atsushi Arai FP
- 10 Yusuke Inaba FP
- 11 Keigo Okawa FP
- 12 Kenta Araki FP
- 13 Towa Nishimura GK
- Masayuki Yamamoto FP
- Ren Sasano FP

== Group D ==
=== Montenegro ===
The following is the Montenegrin roster.

Head coach: Vladimir Gojković

- 1 Lazar Andrić GK
- 2 Aljoša Mačić FP
- 3 Miroslav Perković FP
- 4 Kanstantsin Averka FP
- 5 Uroš Čučković FP
- 6 Vlado Popadić FP
- 7 Stefan Vidović FP
- 8 Bogdan Đurđić FP
- 9 Aleksa Ukropina FP
- 10 Vladan Spaić FP
- 11 Dušan Matković FP
- 12 Vasilije Radović FP
- 13 Petar Tešanović GK
- Đuro Radović FP
- Jovan Vujović FP

=== Serbia ===
The following is the Serbian roster.

Head coach: Uroš Stevanović

- 1 Vladimir Mišović GK
- 2 Marko Radulović FP
- 3 Strahinja Rašović FP
- 4 Sava Ranđelović FP
- 5 Đorđe Lazić FP
- 6 Vuk Milojević FP
- 7 Radomir Drašović FP
- 8 Nikola Jakšić FP
- 9 Filip Janković FP
- 10 Nemanja Ubović FP
- 11 Đorđe Vučinić FP
- 12 Vasilije Martinović FP
- 13 Branislav Mitrović GK
- Bogdan Gavrilović FP
- Marko Dimitrijević FP

=== South Africa ===
The following is the South African roster.

Head coach: Vaughn Marlow

- 1 Lwazi Madi GK
- 2 Chad Roman FP
- 3 Niall Wheeler FP
- 4 Ignardus Badenhorst FP
- 5 Cameron Laurenson FP
- 6 Ross Stone FP
- 7 Dane Tucker FP
- 8 Manqoba Bungane FP
- 9 Dylan Cronje FP
- 10 Joshua Faber FP
- 11 Todd Howard FP
- 12 Jonathan Swanepoel FP
- 13 Gareth May GK
- Sven van Zyl FP

=== Spain ===
The following is the Spanish roster.

Head coach: David Martín

- 1 Unai Aguirre GK
- 2 Alberto Munárriz FP
- 3 Álvaro Granados FP
- 4 Bernat Sanahuja FP
- 5 Miguel del Toro FP
- 6 Marc Larumbe FP
- 7 Martin Famera FP
- 8 Sergi Cabanas FP
- 9 Roger Tahull FP
- 10 Felipe Perrone FP
- 11 Blai Mallarach FP
- 12 Alejandro Bustos FP
- 13 Eduardo Lorrio GK
- Alberto Barroso FP
- Fran Valera FP
