= Water polo at the 2024 World Aquatics Championships – Men's team rosters =

This article shows the roster of all participating teams at the men's water polo tournament at the 2024 World Aquatics Championships.

== Group A ==
=== Australia ===
The following is the Australian roster.

Head coach: Timothy Hamill

- 1 Nick Porter GK
- 2 Angus Lambie FP
- 3 George Ford FP
- 4 Charlie Negus FP
- 5 Nathan Power FP
- 6 Lachlan Edwards FP
- 7 Luke Pavillard FP
- 8 Matthew Byrnes FP
- 9 Milos Maksimovic FP
- 10 Timothy Putt FP
- 11 Chaz Poot FP
- 12 Blake Edwards FP
- 13 John Hedges GK
- 14 Marcus Berehulak FP
- 15 Samuel Slobodien FP

=== Croatia ===
The following is the Croatian roster.

Head coach: Ivica Tucak

- 1 Marko Bijač GK
- 2 Rino Burić FP
- 3 Loren Fatović FP
- 4 Luka Lončar FP
- 5 Franko Lazić FP
- 6 Matias Biljaka FP
- 7 Ante Vukičević FP
- 8 Marko Žuvela FP
- 9 Jerko Marinić Kragić FP
- 10 Josip Vrlić FP
- 11 Zvonimir Butić FP
- 12 Konstantin Kharkov FP
- 13 Mate Anić GK
- 14 Ivan Krapić FP
- 15 Nikolay Bonev FP

=== South Africa ===
The following is the South African roster.

Head coach: Jon Marc De Carvalho

- 1 Lwazi Madi GK
- 2 Farouk Mayman FP
- 3 Niall Wheeler FP
- 4 Cameron Laurenson FP
- 5 Todd Howard FP
- 6 Ross Stone FP
- 7 Sven van Zyl FP
- 8 Manqoba Bungane FP
- 9 Dane Tucker FP
- 10 Joshua Faber FP
- 11 Matthew Neser FP
- 12 Jonathan Swanepoel FP
- 13 Gareth May GK
- 14 Liam Neill FP
- 15 Janco Rademeyer FP

=== Spain ===
The following is the Spanish roster.

Head coach: David Martín

- 1 Unai Aguirre GK
- 2 Alberto Munárriz FP
- 3 Álvaro Granados FP
- 4 Bernat Sanahuja FP
- 5 Miguel del Toro FP
- 6 Marc Larumbe FP
- 7 Martin Famera FP
- 8 Sergi Cabanas FP
- 9 Roger Tahull FP
- 10 Felipe Perrone FP
- 11 Blai Mallarach FP
- 12 Alejandro Bustos FP
- 13 Eduardo Lorrio GK
- 14 Unai Biel FP
- 15 Fran Valera FP

== Group B ==
=== Brazil ===
The following is Brazilian roster.

Head coach: Bárbaro Díaz

- 1 Guilherme Barrella GK
- 2 Logan Cabral CB
- 3 Alipio Nardaci FP
- 4 Gustavo Coutinho D
- 5 Roberto Freitas D
- 6 Lucas Andrade FP
- 7 Rafael Real D
- 8 Pedro Real FP
- 9 Marcos Pires FP
- 10 Gabriel da Silva FP
- 11 Gustavo Guimarães D
- 12 Luis Ricardo Silva CF
- 13 Alexandre Mendes GK
- 14 Frederico Carsalade FP

=== China ===
The following is the Chinese roster.

Head coach: Ivan Asič

- 1 Wu Honghui GK
- 2 Zhu Beile FP
- 3 Chu Chenghao FP
- 4 Peng Jiahao FP
- 5 Zhang Jinpeng FP
- 6 Xie Zekai FP
- 7 Chen Zhongxian FP
- 8 Chen Rui FP
- 9 Chen Yimin FP
- 10 Liu Yu FP
- 11 Zhang Chufeng FP
- 12 Shen Dingsong FP
- 13 Liang Zhiwei GK
- 14 Zhao Yuehao FP
- 15 He Xingmeng FP

=== France ===
The following is the French roster.

Head coach: Florian Bruzzo

- 1 Clément Dubois GK
- 2 Rémi Saudadier FP
- 3 Ugo Crousillat FP
- 4 Alexandre Bouet FP
- 5 Enzo Khasz FP
- 6 Thomas Vernoux FP
- 7 Romain Marion-Vernoux FP
- 8 Emil Bjorch FP
- 9 Duje Živković FP
- 10 Michaël Bodegas FP
- 11 Pierre-Frédéric Vanpeperstraete FP
- 12 Andrea De Nardi FP
- 13 Hugo Fontani GK
- 14 Charles Canonne FP
- 15 Enzo Nardon FP

=== Greece ===
The following is the Greek roster.

Head coach: Theodoros Vlachos

- 1 Emmanouil Zerdevas GK
- 2 Konstantinos Genidounias FP
- 3 Dimitrios Skoumpakis FP
- 4 Konstantinos Gkiouvetsis FP
- 5 Ioannis Fountoulis FP
- 6 Alexandros Papanastasiou FP
- 7 Nikolaos Gkillas FP
- 8 Stylianos Argyropoulos FP
- 9 Ioannis Alafragkis FP
- 10 Konstantinos Kakaris FP
- 11 Dimitrios Nikolaidis FP
- 12 Angelos Vlachopoulos FP
- 13 Panagiotis Tzortzatos GK
- 14 Efstathios Kalogeropoulos FP
- 15 Nikolaos Papanikolaou FP

== Group C ==
=== Japan ===
The following is the Japanese roster.

Head coach: Yoshinori Shiota

- 1 Katsuyuki Tanamura GK
- 2 Seiya Adachi FP
- 3 Taiyo Watanabe FP
- 4 Daichi Ogihara FP
- 5 Kai Inoue FP
- 6 Toi Suzuki FP
- 7 Kiyomu Date FP
- 8 Mitsuru Takata FP
- 9 Ikkei Nitta FP
- 10 Yusuke Inaba FP
- 11 Keigo Okawa FP
- 12 Kenta Araki FP
- 13 Towa Nishimura GK
- 14 Taiki Katayama FP
- 15 Ren Sasano FP

=== Montenegro ===
The following is the Montenegrin roster.

Head coach: Vladimir Gojković

- 1 Lazar Andrić GK
- 2 Draško Brguljan FP
- 3 Miroslav Perković FP
- 4 Kanstantsin Averka FP
- 5 Aljoša Macic FP
- 6 Vlado Popadić FP
- 7 Stefan Vidović FP
- 8 Đuro Radović FP
- 9 Aleksa Ukropina FP
- 10 Vladan Spaić FP
- 11 Dušan Matković FP
- 12 Vasilije Radović FP
- 13 Petar Tešanović GK
- 14 Marko Mršić FP
- 15 Jovan Vujović FP

=== Serbia ===
The following is the Serbian roster.

Head coach: Uroš Stevanović

- 1 Radoslav Filipović GK
- 2 Dušan Mandić FP
- 3 Strahinja Rašović FP
- 4 Sava Ranđelović FP
- 5 Petar Jakšić FP
- 6 Đorđe Vučinić FP
- 7 Radomir Drašović FP
- 8 Nikola Jakšić FP
- 9 Nemanja Vico FP
- 10 Nemanja Ubović FP
- 11 Nikola Lukić FP
- 12 Viktor Rašović FP
- 13 Branislav Mitrović GK
- 14 Đorđe Lazić FP
- 15 Luka Gladović FP

=== United States ===
The following is the American roster.

Head coach: Dejan Udovičić

- 1 Adrian Weinberg GK
- 2 Johnny Hooper FP
- 3 Marko Vavic FP
- 4 Alexander Obert FP
- 5 Hannes Daube FP
- 6 Luca Cupido FP
- 7 Ben Hallock FP
- 8 Dylan Woodhead FP
- 9 Alex Bowen FP
- 10 Chase Dodd FP
- 11 Ryder Dodd FP
- 12 Max Irving FP
- 13 Drew Holland GK
- 14 Tyler Abramson FP
- 15 Quinn Woodhead FP

== Group D ==
=== Hungary ===
The following is the Hungarian roster.

Head coach: Zsolt Varga

- 1 Soma Vogel GK
- 2 Dániel Angyal FP
- 3 Krisztián Manhercz FP
- 4 Zoltán Pohl FP
- 5 Márton Vámos FP
- 6 Ádám Nagy FP
- 7 Gergő Zalánki FP
- 8 Gergő Fekete FP
- 9 Toni Német FP
- 10 Dénes Varga FP
- 11 Szilárd Jansik FP
- 12 Péter Kovács FP
- 13 Márk Bányai GK
- 14 Vince Vigvári FP
- 15 Dávid Tátrai FP

=== Italy ===
The following is the Italian roster.

Head coach: Sandro Campagna

- 1 Marco Del Lungo GK
- 2 Francesco Di Fulvio FP
- 3 Luca Damonte FP
- 4 Luca Marziali FP
- 5 Andrea Fondelli FP
- 6 Giacomo Cannella FP
- 7 Vincenzo Renzuto FP
- 8 Gonzalo Echenique FP
- 9 Nicholas Presciutti FP
- 10 Lorenzo Bruni FP
- 11 Edoardo Di Somma FP
- 12 Alessandro Velotto FP
- 13 Gianmarco Nicosia GK
- 14 Francesco Condemi FP
- 15 Matteo Iocchi FP

=== Kazakhstan ===
The following is the Kazakh roster.

Head coach: Rustam Ukumanov

- 1 Temirlan Balfanbayev GK
- 2 Eduard Tsoy FP
- 3 Alexandr Yeremin FP
- 4 Yegor Beloussov FP
- 5 Maxim Lamayev FP
- 6 Vladimir Yurtayev FP
- 7 Anatoliy Pustovalov FP
- 8 Tamir Gribov FP
- 9 Ruslan Akhmetov FP
- 10 Igor Nedokontsev FP
- 11 Kirill Panteleyev FP
- 12 Sultan Shonzhigitov FP
- 13 Akzhan Aday GK
- 14 Nurzhas Nurtaza FP

=== Romania ===
The following is the Romanian roster.

Head coach: Bogdan Rath

- 1 Marius-Florin Tic GK
- 2 David Belenyesi FP
- 3 Matei-Ioan Lutescu FP
- 4 Tudor-Andrei Fulea FP
- 5 Ionut-Valentin Vranceanu FP
- 6 Andrei Prioteasa FP
- 7 Andrei Tepelus FP
- 8 Nicolae Olanta FP
- 9 Silvian Colodrovschi FP
- 10 Vlad-Luca Georgescu FP
- 11 Francesco Iudean FP
- 12 Levente Vancsik FP
- 13 Eduard-Mihai Dragusin GK
- 14 Andrei Neamtu FP
- 15 David-Joan Bota FP
