= Greece at the 2025 World Aquatics Championships =

- Flag of Greece
- World Aquatics code: GRE
- National federation: Hellenic Swimming Federation
- Website: koe.org.gr (in Greek)

in Singapore
- Competitors: 62 in 5 sports
- Medals Ranked 18th: Gold 1 Silver 0 Bronze 1 Total 2

World Aquatics Championships appearances
- 1973; 1975; 1978; 1982; 1986; 1991; 1994; 1998; 2001; 2003; 2005; 2007; 2009; 2011; 2013; 2015; 2017; 2019; 2022; 2023; 2024; 2025

Greece competed at the 2025 World Aquatics Championships in Singapore from July 11 to August 3, 2025.

== Medalists ==
Medal	Name	Sport	Event	Date
1st place, gold medalist(s)	Greece women's national water polo team	Water polo	Women's tournament	23 July 2025
3rd place, bronze medalist(s)	Greece men's national water polo team	Water polo	Men's tournament	24 July 2025

== Competitors ==
The following is the list of competitors in the Championships.

Sport	Men	Women	Total
Artistic swimming	2	10	12
Diving	2	0	2
Open water swimming	2	1	3
Swimming	10	5	15
Water polo	15	15	30
Total	31	31	62

== Artistic swimming ==
Men

Athlete	Event	Preliminaries		Final	
Athlete	Event	Points	Rank	Points	Rank
Marios Critsas	Solo technical routine	—		195.2258	10
Marios Critsas	Solo free routine	—		167.7863	10

Women

Athlete	Event	Preliminaries		Final	
Athlete	Event	Points	Rank	Points	Rank
Zoi Karangelou	Solo technical routine	229.3250	16	Did not advance	
Zoi Karangelou	Solo free routine	213.8351	10 Q	216.1775	11
Zoi Karangelou; Sofia Malkogeorgou	Duet technical routine	260.0175	14	Did not advance	
Sofia Malkogeorgou; Vasiliki Thanou	Duet free routine	240.2455	10 Q	257.2792	6

Mixed

Athlete	Event	Preliminaries		Final	
Athlete	Event	Points	Rank	Points	Rank
Thaleia Dampali; Athina Kamarinopoulou; Zoi Karangelou; Sofia Malkogeorgou; Despoina Pentza; Sofia Rigakou; Vasiliki Thanou; Danai Tsaprali	Team technical routine	247.2800	9 Q	255.4266	11
Thaleia Dampali; Athina Kamarinopoulou; Stylianos Koukouselis Fouskis; Artemi Koutraki; Despoina Pentza; Sofia Rigakou; Danai Tsaprali; Georgia Myrto Zangana	Team free routine	261.7529	9 Q	250.2924	9
Thaleia Dampali; Athina Kamarinopoulou; Stylianos Koukouselis Fouskis; Artemi Koutraki; Sofia Rigakou; Vasiliki Thanou; Danai Tsaprali; Georgia Myrto Zangana	Team acrobatic routine	176.8464	14	Did not advance	

== Diving ==
Men

Athlete	Event	Preliminaries		Semifinals		Final	
Athlete	Event	Points	Rank	Points	Rank	Points	Rank
Theofilos Afthinos	1 m springboard	296.60	35	—		Did not advance	
Theofilos Afthinos	3 m springboard	344.90	35	Did not advance			
Stavros Sifnaios	10 m platform	262.70	45	Did not advance			

== Open water swimming ==
Men

Athlete	Event	Heats		Semifinal		Final	
Athlete	Event	Time	Rank	Time	Rank	Time	Rank
Konstantinos Chourdakis	Men's 3 km knockout sprints	17:10.3	12	Did not advance			
Konstantinos Chourdakis	Men's 5 km	—				1:02:43.1	47
Athanasios Kynigakis	Men's 3 km knockout sprints	17:08.2	8 Q	11:35.8	18	Did not advance	
Athanasios Kynigakis	Men's 5 km	—				58:24.3	18
Athanasios Kynigakis	Men's 10 km	—				2:03:05.6	14

Women

Athlete	Event	Heats		Semifinal		Final	
Athlete	Event	Time	Rank	Time	Rank	Time	Rank
Georgia Makri	Women's 3 km knockout sprints	18:36.8	10 Q	12:23.8	19	Did not advance	
Georgia Makri	Women's 5 km	—				1:06:28.9	28
Georgia Makri	Women's 10 km	—				2:16:07.6	21

== Swimming ==
Greece entered 15 swimmers.

Men

Athlete	Event	Heat		Semi-final		Final	
Athlete	Event	Time	Rank	Time	Rank	Time	Rank
Stergios Bilas	50 m freestyle	22.06	22	Did not advance			
50 m butterfly	23.04	7 Q	23.00	11	Did not advance		
Apostolos Christou	50 m backstroke	24.65	6 Q	24.50	5 Q	24.59	6
Apostolos Christou	100 m backstroke	52.61	4 Q	52.44	6 Q	52.62	8
Daniil Giourtzidis	400 m individual medley	4:16.62	15	—		Did not advance	
Evangelos Makrygiannis	50 m backstroke	25.04	24	Did not advance			
Evangelos Makrygiannis	100 m backstroke	53.29	11 Q	53.36	14	Did not advance	
Dimitrios Markos	200 m freestyle	1:46.28 NR	11 Q	1:47.01	15	Did not advance	
Dimitrios Markos	400 m freestyle	3:47.59	17	—		Did not advance	
Dimitrios Markos	800 m freestyle	7:54.88	17	—		Did not advance	
Apostolos Papastamos	200 m individual medley	2:00.38	21	Did not advance			
Apostolos Papastamos	400 m individual medley	4:31.05	30	—		Did not advance	
Apostolos Siskos	200 m backstroke	1:56.55	6 Q	1:55.06	6 Q	1:55.13	5
Apostolos Siskos	200 m butterfly	Disqualified		Did not advance			
Konstantinos Stamou	100 m butterfly	52.81	33	Did not advance			
Savvas Thomoglou	100 m breaststroke	1:01.13	32	Did not advance			
Savvas Thomoglou	200 m breaststroke	2:12.47	23	Did not advance			
Dimitrios Markos; Konstantinos Englezakis; Konstantinos Stamou; Apostolos Papastamos	4 × 200 m freestyle relay	7:13.60	13	—		Did not advance	
Evangelos Makrygiannis; Savvas Thomoglou; Konstantinos Stamou; Stergios Bilas	4 × 100 medley relay	3:36.20	17	—		Did not advance	

Women

Athlete	Event	Heat		Semi-final		Final	
Athlete	Event	Time	Rank	Time	Rank	Time	Rank
Georgia Damasioti	100 m butterfly	58.60	21	Did not advance			
Georgia Damasioti	200 m butterfly	2:09.34	10 Q	2:08.39 NR	10	Did not advance	
Theodora Drakou	50 m freestyle	25.00	20	Did not advance			
Theodora Drakou	50 m backstroke	27.94	14 Q	27.75 NR	13	Did not advance	
Anna Ntountounaki	50 m butterfly	26.01	17	Did not advance			
Anna Ntountounaki	100 m butterfly	57.62	12 Q	57.32	10	Did not advance	
Nikoletta Pavlopoulou	50 m breaststroke	Did not start		Did not advance			
Nikoletta Pavlopoulou	100 m breaststroke	1:09.83	38	Did not advance			
Nikoletta Pavlopoulou	200 m individual medley	2:13.85 NR	24	Did not advance			
Artemis Vasilaki	800 m freestyle	8:42.72	19	—		Did not advance	
Artemis Vasilaki	1500 m freestyle	16:36.57	19	—		Did not advance	
Artemis Vasilaki	400 m individual medley	4:53.27	21	—		Did not advance	
Theodora Drakou; Nikoletta Pavlopoulou; Georgia Damasioti; Anna Ntountounaki	4 × 100 medley relay	4:06.20	18	—		Did not advance	

Mixed

Athlete	Event	Heat		Final	
Athlete	Event	Time	Rank	Time	Rank
Dimitrios Markos; Konstantinos Stamou; Artemis Vasilaki; Nikoletta Pavlopoulou	4 × 100 m freestyle relay	3:31.54	18	Did not advance	
Evangelos Makrygiannis; Savvas Thomoglou; Anna Ntountounaki; Artemis Vasiliki	4 × 100 m medley relay	3:49.47	16	Did not advance	

== Water polo ==
Summary

Team	Event	Group stage				Playoff	Quarterfinal	Semi-final	Final / BM	
Team	Event	Opposition Score	Opposition Score	Opposition Score	Rank	Opposition Score	Opposition Score	Opposition Score	Opposition Score	Rank
Greece	Men's tournament	Montenegro; L 9–10	China; W 26–5	Croatia; L 9–10	3 P/off	Brazil; W 17–5	Italy; W 17–11	Spain; L 7–7; PSO 2–4	Serbia; W 16–7	3rd place, bronze medalist(s)
Greece	Women's tournament	Hungary; L 9–10	Croatia; W 31–7	Japan; W 25–5	2 P/off	France; W 23–9	Australia; W 8–7	United States; W 14-10	Hungary; W 12-9	1st place, gold medalist(s)

=== Men's tournament ===
Team roster

The following is the Greek roster.

Head coach: Theodoros Vlachos

- 1 Panagiotis Tzortzatos GK
- 2 Konstantinos Genidounias FP
- 3 Dimitrios Skoumpakis FP
- 4 Konstantinos Gkiouvetsis FP
- 5 Stylianos Argyropoulos FP
- 6 Aristeidis Chalyvopoulos FP
- 7 Nikolaos Gkillas FP
- 8 Efstathios Kalogeropoulos FP
- 9 Ioannis Alafragkis FP
- 10 Konstantinos Kakaris FP
- 11 Dimitrios Nikolaidis FP
- 12 Nikolaos Papanikolaou FP
- 13 Emmanouil Andreadis GK
- 14 Evangelos Pouros FP
- 15 Nikolaos Gardikas FP

Group play

Pos	Team	Pld	W	PSW	PSL	L	GF	GA	GD	Pts	Qualification
1	Croatia	3	3	0	0	0	48	26	+22	9	Quarterfinals
2	Montenegro	3	2	0	0	1	34	30	+4	6	Playoffs
3	Greece	3	1	0	0	2	44	25	+19	3	Playoffs
4	China	3	0	0	0	3	19	64	−45	0	13–16th place semifinals

Source: Omegatiming
Rules for classification: 1) points; 2) head-to-head points; 3) head-to-head goal difference; 4) head-to-head number of goals scored; 5) Goal difference.

12 July 2025; 19:10	Report	Montenegro	10–9	Greece	OCBC Aquatic Centre, Singapore; Referees: Tamás Kovács-Csatlós (HUN), David Gómez (ESP)
12 July 2025; 19:10	Report	Score by quarters: 5–3, 2–3, 1–1, 2–2			OCBC Aquatic Centre, Singapore; Referees: Tamás Kovács-Csatlós (HUN), David Gómez (ESP)
12 July 2025; 19:10	Report	Gardašević, Radović 3	Goals	Gkillas 3	OCBC Aquatic Centre, Singapore; Referees: Tamás Kovács-Csatlós (HUN), David Gómez (ESP)

14 July 2025; 12:10	Report	Greece	26–5	China	OCBC Aquatic Centre, Singapore; Referees: Marta Cabanas (ESP), Chisato Kurosaki (JPN)
14 July 2025; 12:10	Report	Score by quarters: 2–0, 10–0, 6–3, 8–2			OCBC Aquatic Centre, Singapore; Referees: Marta Cabanas (ESP), Chisato Kurosaki (JPN)
14 July 2025; 12:10	Report	Nikolaidis 5	Goals	five players 1	OCBC Aquatic Centre, Singapore; Referees: Marta Cabanas (ESP), Chisato Kurosaki (JPN)

16 July 2025; 17:35	Report	Greece	9–10	Croatia	OCBC Aquatic Centre, Singapore; Referees: Nicholas Hodgers (AUS), David Gómez (ESP)
16 July 2025; 17:35	Report	Score by quarters: 4–1, 2–4, 1–4, 2–1			OCBC Aquatic Centre, Singapore; Referees: Nicholas Hodgers (AUS), David Gómez (ESP)
16 July 2025; 17:35	Report	Alafragkis, Kalogeropoulos 2	Goals	Fatović 3	OCBC Aquatic Centre, Singapore; Referees: Nicholas Hodgers (AUS), David Gómez (ESP)

Playoffs

18 July 2025; 19:10	Report	Brazil	5–17	Greece	OCBC Aquatic Centre, Singapore; Referees: Boris Margeta (SLO), Dasch Barber (RSA)
18 July 2025; 19:10	Report	Score by quarters: 0–2, 0–5, 2–5, 3–5			OCBC Aquatic Centre, Singapore; Referees: Boris Margeta (SLO), Dasch Barber (RSA)
18 July 2025; 19:10	Report	Real 2	Goals	Chalyvopoulos, Genidounias 3	OCBC Aquatic Centre, Singapore; Referees: Boris Margeta (SLO), Dasch Barber (RSA)

Quarterfinals

20 July 2025; 16:00	Report	Italy	11–17	Greece	OCBC Aquatic Centre, Singapore; Referees: Andrej Franulović (CRO), Boris Margeta (SLO)
20 July 2025; 16:00	Report	Score by quarters: 1–6, 1–3, 4–4, 5–4			OCBC Aquatic Centre, Singapore; Referees: Andrej Franulović (CRO), Boris Margeta (SLO)
20 July 2025; 16:00	Report	Bruni 3	Goals	Argyropoulos 4	OCBC Aquatic Centre, Singapore; Referees: Andrej Franulović (CRO), Boris Margeta (SLO)

Semifinals

22 July 2025; 17:35	Report	Greece	9–11	Spain	OCBC Aquatic Centre, Singapore; Referees: Michiel Zwart (NED), Frank Ohme (GER)
22 July 2025; 17:35	Report	Score by quarters: 2–3, 1–3, 1–0, 3–1 PSO: 2–4			OCBC Aquatic Centre, Singapore; Referees: Michiel Zwart (NED), Frank Ohme (GER)
22 July 2025; 17:35	Report	Genidounias, Gkillas 2	Goals	Sanahuja 3	OCBC Aquatic Centre, Singapore; Referees: Michiel Zwart (NED), Frank Ohme (GER)

Third place game

24 July 2025; 17:35	Report	Greece	16–7	Serbia	OCBC Aquatic Centre, Singapore; Referees: David Gómez (ESP), Tamás Kovács-Csatlós (HUN)
24 July 2025; 17:35	Report	Score by quarters: 2–2, 6–0, 3–3, 5–2			OCBC Aquatic Centre, Singapore; Referees: David Gómez (ESP), Tamás Kovács-Csatlós (HUN)
24 July 2025; 17:35	Report	Kalogeropoulos, Papanikolaou 2	Goals	Martinović 4	OCBC Aquatic Centre, Singapore; Referees: David Gómez (ESP), Tamás Kovács-Csatlós (HUN)

=== Women's tournament ===
Team roster

The following is the Greek roster. Head coach: Antonios Vlontakis

- 1 Ioanna Stamatopoulou GK
- 2 Eleftheria Plevritou FP
- 3 Foteini Tricha FP
- 4 Stefania Santa FP
- 5 Athina Giannopoulou FP
- 6 Eleni Xenaki FP
- 7 Eirini Ninou FP
- 8 Maria Patra FP
- 9 Christina Siouti FP
- 10 Vasiliki Plevritou FP
- 11 Sofia Tornarou FP
- 12 Maria Myriokefalitaki FP
- 13 Alexia Evgenia Tzourka GK
- 14 Dionysia Koureta FP
- 15 Nefeli Anna Krassa FP

Group play

Pos	Team	Pld	W	PSW	PSL	L	GF	GA	GD	Pts	Qualification
1	Hungary	3	3	0	0	0	65	28	+37	9	Quarterfinals
2	Greece	3	2	0	0	1	65	32	+33	6	Playoffs
3	Japan	3	1	0	0	2	53	70	−17	3	Playoffs
4	Croatia	3	0	0	0	3	25	78	−53	0	13–16th place semifinals

Source: Omegatiming
Rules for classification: 1) points; 2) head-to-head points; 3) head-to-head goal difference; 4) head-to-head number of goals scored; 5) Goal difference.

11 July 2025; 20:45	Report	Greece	9–10	Hungary	OCBC Aquatic Centre, Singapore; Referees: Jennifer McCall (USA), Frank Ohme (GER)
11 July 2025; 20:45	Report	Score by quarters: 2–1, 3–3, 0–4, 4–2			OCBC Aquatic Centre, Singapore; Referees: Jennifer McCall (USA), Frank Ohme (GER)
11 July 2025; 20:45	Report	Tricha 6	Goals	Rybanska 3	OCBC Aquatic Centre, Singapore; Referees: Jennifer McCall (USA), Frank Ohme (GER)

13 July 2025; 13:45	Report	Croatia	7–31	Greece	OCBC Aquatic Centre, Singapore; Referees: Alessia Ferrari (ITA), Ivan Raković (SRB)
13 July 2025; 13:45	Report	Score by quarters: 1–9, 4–7, 1–7, 1–8			OCBC Aquatic Centre, Singapore; Referees: Alessia Ferrari (ITA), Ivan Raković (SRB)
13 July 2025; 13:45	Report	Srhoj 3	Goals	Tricha 5	OCBC Aquatic Centre, Singapore; Referees: Alessia Ferrari (ITA), Ivan Raković (SRB)

15 July 2025; 10:35	Report	Greece	25–15	Japan	OCBC Aquatic Centre, Singapore; Referees: Wu Zhekang (SGP), Scott Voltz (USA)
15 July 2025; 10:35	Report	Score by quarters: 6–3, 6–3, 6–4, 7–5			OCBC Aquatic Centre, Singapore; Referees: Wu Zhekang (SGP), Scott Voltz (USA)
15 July 2025; 10:35	Report	Myriokefalitaki 7	Goals	Kawaguchi 5	OCBC Aquatic Centre, Singapore; Referees: Wu Zhekang (SGP), Scott Voltz (USA)

Playoffs

17 July 2025; 19:10	Report	Greece	23–9	France	OCBC Aquatic Centre, Singapore; Referees: Dasch Barber (RSA), Marcella Braga (BRA)
17 July 2025; 19:10	Report	Score by quarters: 4–4, 4–3, 8–0, 7–2			OCBC Aquatic Centre, Singapore; Referees: Dasch Barber (RSA), Marcella Braga (BRA)
17 July 2025; 19:10	Report	Tricha 5	Goals	Heurtaux 4	OCBC Aquatic Centre, Singapore; Referees: Dasch Barber (RSA), Marcella Braga (BRA)

Quarterfinals

19 July 2025; 16:00	Report	Australia	7–8	Greece	OCBC Aquatic Centre, Singapore; Referees: Zhang Liang (CHN), Michiel Zwart (NED)
19 July 2025; 16:00	Report	Score by quarters: 1–1, 2–4, 2–1, 2–2			OCBC Aquatic Centre, Singapore; Referees: Zhang Liang (CHN), Michiel Zwart (NED)
19 July 2025; 16:00	Report	A. Andrews, C. Andrews 2	Goals	Plevritou, Santa 2	OCBC Aquatic Centre, Singapore; Referees: Zhang Liang (CHN), Michiel Zwart (NED)

Semifinals

21 July 2025; 17:35	Report	Greece	14–10	United States	OCBC Aquatic Centre, Singapore; Referees: Boris Margeta (SLO), Frank Ohme (GER)
21 July 2025; 17:35	Report	Score by quarters: 2–2, 4–3, 3–3, 5–2			OCBC Aquatic Centre, Singapore; Referees: Boris Margeta (SLO), Frank Ohme (GER)
21 July 2025; 17:35	Report	V. Plevritou 4	Goals	four players 2	OCBC Aquatic Centre, Singapore; Referees: Boris Margeta (SLO), Frank Ohme (GER)

Final

23 July 2025; 21:35	Report	Greece	12–9	Hungary	OCBC Aquatic Centre, Singapore; Referees: Alessia Ferrari (ITA), Marta Cabanas (ESP)
23 July 2025; 21:35	Report	Score by quarters: 3–1, 5–3, 2–2, 2–3			OCBC Aquatic Centre, Singapore; Referees: Alessia Ferrari (ITA), Marta Cabanas (ESP)
23 July 2025; 21:35	Report	Tricha, Xenaki 3	Goals	Tiba, Hajdú 2	OCBC Aquatic Centre, Singapore; Referees: Alessia Ferrari (ITA), Marta Cabanas (ESP)
