= 2026 World Aquatics Men's Water Polo World Cup =

- League: Men's Water Polo World Cup
- Sport: Water polo
- Duration: 6 April – 26 July

Super Final
- Finals champions: Greece (1st title)
- Runners-up: Hungary

Men's Water Polo World Cup seasons
- ← 2025 2027 →

The 2026 World Aquatics Men's Water Polo World Cup was the 19th season of the event. It ran from 7 April to 26 July 2026. The super final was held in Sydney, Australia.

Greece won their first title with a win over Hungary. The top three teams qualified for the 2027 World Aquatics Championships.

== Format ==
There were two divisions. The top five teams of Division 1 and the top two teams from Division 2, together with the host Australia, competed in the Super Final. A win gave a team three points, a win after penalties two, a loss after penalties one and a loss after regular time zero points.

== Division 1 ==
Division 1
Tournament details
- Host country: Greece
- Venue: 1
- Dates: 6–12 April
- Teams: 8

Tournament statistics
- Matches played: 24
- Goals scored: 583 (24.29 per match)
- Top scorers: (Greece) Stylianos Argyropoulos (24 goals)

Official website
- www.worldaquatics.com

Division 1 was held in Alexandroupolis, Greece between 6 and 12 April 2026.

The teams were split into two pools of four teams, with the top two teams forming a new group, same with the bottom two teams. The top five teams advanced to the super final.

=== Referees ===
For Division 1, the following referees were selected for the tournament. The referees represent 10 countries including 8 participating countries along with 2 neutral officials from Slovenia and Japan.

- (Croatia) Jakov Blašković
- (Greece) Konstantinos Vasileiou
- (Hungary) Norbert Ercse
- (Italy) Raffaele Colombo
- (Japan) Chisato Kurosaki
- (Netherlands) Michiel Zwart
- (Serbia) Pavle Kiš
- (Slovenia) Boris Margeta
- (Spain) Pau Segurana
- (United States) Levon Dermendjian

All times are local (UTC+3).

=== Preliminary round ===
==== Group A ====
Pos	Team	Pld	W	PW	PL	L	GF	GA	GD	Pts	Qualification
1	Hungary	3	2	1	0	0	36	33	+3	8	Group C
2	Greece	3	2	0	0	1	42	39	+3	6	Group C
3	Serbia	3	1	0	0	2	40	39	+1	3	Group D
4	Netherlands	3	0	0	1	2	33	40	−7	1	Group D

Source: Microplustiming
Rules for classification: 1) Points; 2) Head-to-head points; 3) Head-to-head goal difference; 4) Head-to-head goals scored; 5) Goal difference.

6 April 2026; 14:00	Report	Serbia	15–11	Netherlands	"Demosthenes Michalentzakis" Swimming Pool, Alexandroupolis; Referees: Raffaele Colombo (ITA), Pau Segurana (ESP)
6 April 2026; 14:00	Report	Score by quarters: 5–4, 2–2, 4–4, 4–1			"Demosthenes Michalentzakis" Swimming Pool, Alexandroupolis; Referees: Raffaele Colombo (ITA), Pau Segurana (ESP)
6 April 2026; 14:00	Report	Martinović 5	Goals	Van den Burg 3	"Demosthenes Michalentzakis" Swimming Pool, Alexandroupolis; Referees: Raffaele Colombo (ITA), Pau Segurana (ESP)

6 April 2026; 18:00	Report	Hungary	13–12	Greece	"Demosthenes Michalentzakis" Swimming Pool, Alexandroupolis; Referees: Levon Dermendjian (USA), Chisato Kurosaki (JPN)
6 April 2026; 18:00	Report	Score by quarters: 3–2, 3–5, 4–3, 3–2			"Demosthenes Michalentzakis" Swimming Pool, Alexandroupolis; Referees: Levon Dermendjian (USA), Chisato Kurosaki (JPN)
6 April 2026; 18:00	Report	Vigvári 4	Goals	Gkillas, Papanastasiou 3	"Demosthenes Michalentzakis" Swimming Pool, Alexandroupolis; Referees: Levon Dermendjian (USA), Chisato Kurosaki (JPN)

7 April 2026; 14:00	Report	Netherlands	11–11; PSO: 4–5	Hungary	"Demosthenes Michalentzakis" Swimming Pool, Alexandroupolis; Referees: Pau Segurana (ESP), Jakov Blašković (CRO)
7 April 2026; 14:00	Report	Score by quarters: 4–3, 0–3, 3–2, 4–3			"Demosthenes Michalentzakis" Swimming Pool, Alexandroupolis; Referees: Pau Segurana (ESP), Jakov Blašković (CRO)
7 April 2026; 14:00	Report	four players 4	Goals	Fekete, Nagy 3	"Demosthenes Michalentzakis" Swimming Pool, Alexandroupolis; Referees: Pau Segurana (ESP), Jakov Blašković (CRO)

7 April 2026; 18:00	Report	Greece	16–15	Serbia	"Demosthenes Michalentzakis" Swimming Pool, Alexandroupolis; Referees: Raffaele Colombo (ITA), Chisato Kurosaki (JPN)
7 April 2026; 18:00	Report	Score by quarters: 3–4, 4–7, 6–3, 3–1			"Demosthenes Michalentzakis" Swimming Pool, Alexandroupolis; Referees: Raffaele Colombo (ITA), Chisato Kurosaki (JPN)
7 April 2026; 18:00	Report	Argyropoulos 6	Goals	Martinović 4	"Demosthenes Michalentzakis" Swimming Pool, Alexandroupolis; Referees: Raffaele Colombo (ITA), Chisato Kurosaki (JPN)

8 April 2026; 14:00	Report	Serbia	10–12	Hungary	"Demosthenes Michalentzakis" Swimming Pool, Alexandroupolis; Referees: Boris Margeta (SLO), Pau Segurana (ESP)
8 April 2026; 14:00	Report	Score by quarters: 2–3, 2–3, 3–5, 3–1			"Demosthenes Michalentzakis" Swimming Pool, Alexandroupolis; Referees: Boris Margeta (SLO), Pau Segurana (ESP)
8 April 2026; 14:00	Report	Lukić 3	Goals	Vigvári 4	"Demosthenes Michalentzakis" Swimming Pool, Alexandroupolis; Referees: Boris Margeta (SLO), Pau Segurana (ESP)

8 April 2026; 18:00	Report	Netherlands	11–14	Greece	"Demosthenes Michalentzakis" Swimming Pool, Alexandroupolis; Referees: Levon Dermendjian (USA), Jakov Blašković (CRO)
8 April 2026; 18:00	Report	Score by quarters: 3–4, 4–4, 2–2, 2–4			"Demosthenes Michalentzakis" Swimming Pool, Alexandroupolis; Referees: Levon Dermendjian (USA), Jakov Blašković (CRO)
8 April 2026; 18:00	Report	De Weerd 3	Goals	Argyropoulos 7	"Demosthenes Michalentzakis" Swimming Pool, Alexandroupolis; Referees: Levon Dermendjian (USA), Jakov Blašković (CRO)

==== Group B ====
Pos	Team	Pld	W	PW	PL	L	GF	GA	GD	Pts	Qualification
1	Italy	3	3	0	0	0	40	29	+11	9	Group C
2	Spain	3	2	0	0	1	39	30	+9	6	Group C
3	Croatia	3	1	0	0	2	37	34	+3	3	Group D
4	United States	3	0	0	0	3	23	46	−23	0	Group D

Source: Microplustiming
Rules for classification: 1) Points; 2) Head-to-head points; 3) Head-to-head goal difference; 4) Head-to-head goals scored; 5) Goal difference.

6 April 2026; 16:00	Report	Italy	12–10	Spain	"Demosthenes Michalentzakis" Swimming Pool, Alexandroupolis; Referees: Norbert Ercse (HUN), Konstantions Vasileiou (GRE)
6 April 2026; 16:00	Report	Score by quarters: 2–3, 2–1, 3–3, 5–3			"Demosthenes Michalentzakis" Swimming Pool, Alexandroupolis; Referees: Norbert Ercse (HUN), Konstantions Vasileiou (GRE)
6 April 2026; 16:00	Report	Carnesecchi, Di Somma 3	Goals	Sanahuja 4	"Demosthenes Michalentzakis" Swimming Pool, Alexandroupolis; Referees: Norbert Ercse (HUN), Konstantions Vasileiou (GRE)

6 April 2026; 20:15	Report	Croatia	16–7	United States	"Demosthenes Michalentzakis" Swimming Pool, Alexandroupolis; Referees: Boris Margeta (SLO), Michiel Zwart (NED)
6 April 2026; 20:15	Report	Score by quarters: 4–1, 5–1, 4–3, 3–2			"Demosthenes Michalentzakis" Swimming Pool, Alexandroupolis; Referees: Boris Margeta (SLO), Michiel Zwart (NED)
6 April 2026; 20:15	Report	Brubnjak, Fatović 3	Goals	Saveljic 3	"Demosthenes Michalentzakis" Swimming Pool, Alexandroupolis; Referees: Boris Margeta (SLO), Michiel Zwart (NED)

7 April 2026; 16:00	Report	Spain	14–10	Croatia	"Demosthenes Michalentzakis" Swimming Pool, Alexandroupolis; Referees: Boris Margeta (SLO), Pavle Kiš (SRB)
7 April 2026; 16:00	Report	Score by quarters: 4–3, 5–2, 2–2, 3–3			"Demosthenes Michalentzakis" Swimming Pool, Alexandroupolis; Referees: Boris Margeta (SLO), Pavle Kiš (SRB)
7 April 2026; 16:00	Report	Granados 4	Goals	Butic, Pavlić 3	"Demosthenes Michalentzakis" Swimming Pool, Alexandroupolis; Referees: Boris Margeta (SLO), Pavle Kiš (SRB)

7 April 2026; 20:15	Report	United States	8–15	Italy	"Demosthenes Michalentzakis" Swimming Pool, Alexandroupolis; Referees: Michiel Zwart (NED), Norbert Ercse (HUN)
7 April 2026; 20:15	Report	Score by quarters: 3–4, 0–3, 4–5, 1–3			"Demosthenes Michalentzakis" Swimming Pool, Alexandroupolis; Referees: Michiel Zwart (NED), Norbert Ercse (HUN)
7 April 2026; 20:15	Report	Irving 3	Goals	Campopiano, Ferrero 3	"Demosthenes Michalentzakis" Swimming Pool, Alexandroupolis; Referees: Michiel Zwart (NED), Norbert Ercse (HUN)

8 April 2026; 16:00	Report	Italy	13–11	Croatia	"Demosthenes Michalentzakis" Swimming Pool, Alexandroupolis; Referees: Michiel Zwart (NED), Pavle Kiš (SRB)
8 April 2026; 16:00	Report	Score by quarters: 2–1, 5–6, 4–2, 2–2			"Demosthenes Michalentzakis" Swimming Pool, Alexandroupolis; Referees: Michiel Zwart (NED), Pavle Kiš (SRB)
8 April 2026; 16:00	Report	Gratta 3	Goals	Bonev 3	"Demosthenes Michalentzakis" Swimming Pool, Alexandroupolis; Referees: Michiel Zwart (NED), Pavle Kiš (SRB)

8 April 2026; 20:15	Report	Spain	15–8	United States	"Demosthenes Michalentzakis" Swimming Pool, Alexandroupolis; Referees: Chisato Kurosaki (JPN), Konstantinos Vasileiou (GRE)
8 April 2026; 20:15	Report	Score by quarters: 2–3, 5–2, 6–1, 2–2			"Demosthenes Michalentzakis" Swimming Pool, Alexandroupolis; Referees: Chisato Kurosaki (JPN), Konstantinos Vasileiou (GRE)
8 April 2026; 20:15	Report	Sanahuja 3	Goals	Saveljic 3	"Demosthenes Michalentzakis" Swimming Pool, Alexandroupolis; Referees: Chisato Kurosaki (JPN), Konstantinos Vasileiou (GRE)

=== Second round ===
==== Group C ====
Pos	Team	Pld	W	PW	PL	L	GF	GA	GD	Pts	Qualification
1	Spain	3	2	0	1	0	40	32	+8	7	Super final
2	Italy	3	2	0	0	1	40	39	+1	6	Super final
3	Greece	3	1	1	0	1	41	37	+4	5	Super final
4	Hungary	3	0	0	0	3	28	41	−13	0	Super final

Source: Microplustiming
Rules for classification: 1) Points; 2) Head-to-head points; 3) Head-to-head goal difference; 4) Head-to-head goals scored; 5) Goal difference.

9 April 2026; 17:30	Report	Italy	16–14	Greece	"Demosthenes Michalentzakis" Swimming Pool, Alexandroupolis; Referees: Chisato Kurosaki (JPN), Pavle Kiš (SRB)
9 April 2026; 17:30	Report	Score by quarters: 6–4, 3–6, 2–2, 5–2			"Demosthenes Michalentzakis" Swimming Pool, Alexandroupolis; Referees: Chisato Kurosaki (JPN), Pavle Kiš (SRB)
9 April 2026; 17:30	Report	three players 3	Goals	Kalogeropoulos, Nikolaidis 4	"Demosthenes Michalentzakis" Swimming Pool, Alexandroupolis; Referees: Chisato Kurosaki (JPN), Pavle Kiš (SRB)

9 April 2026; 19:45	Report	Hungary	9–13	Spain	"Demosthenes Michalentzakis" Swimming Pool, Alexandroupolis; Referees: Levon Dermendjian (USA), Jakov Blašković (CRO)
9 April 2026; 19:45	Report	Score by quarters: 3–3, 3–7, 1–1, 2–2			"Demosthenes Michalentzakis" Swimming Pool, Alexandroupolis; Referees: Levon Dermendjian (USA), Jakov Blašković (CRO)
9 April 2026; 19:45	Report	Nagy 2	Goals	Sanahuja 4	"Demosthenes Michalentzakis" Swimming Pool, Alexandroupolis; Referees: Levon Dermendjian (USA), Jakov Blašković (CRO)

11 April 2026; 17:30	Report	Greece	16–10	Hungary	"Demosthenes Michalentzakis" Swimming Pool, Alexandroupolis; Referees: Jakov Blašković (CRO), Pau Segurana (ESP)
11 April 2026; 17:30	Report	Score by quarters: 4–0, 5–3, 2–4, 5–3			"Demosthenes Michalentzakis" Swimming Pool, Alexandroupolis; Referees: Jakov Blašković (CRO), Pau Segurana (ESP)
11 April 2026; 17:30	Report	four players 3	Goals	three players 2	"Demosthenes Michalentzakis" Swimming Pool, Alexandroupolis; Referees: Jakov Blašković (CRO), Pau Segurana (ESP)

11 April 2026; 19:45	Report	Italy	12–16	Spain	"Demosthenes Michalentzakis" Swimming Pool, Alexandroupolis; Referees: Michiel Zwart (NED), Pavle Kiš (SRB)
11 April 2026; 19:45	Report	Score by quarters: 2–6, 5–3, 2–1, 3–6			"Demosthenes Michalentzakis" Swimming Pool, Alexandroupolis; Referees: Michiel Zwart (NED), Pavle Kiš (SRB)
11 April 2026; 19:45	Report	Cassia 3	Goals	Granados 5	"Demosthenes Michalentzakis" Swimming Pool, Alexandroupolis; Referees: Michiel Zwart (NED), Pavle Kiš (SRB)

12 April 2026; 13:00	Report	Spain	11–11; PSO: 2–4	Greece	"Demosthenes Michalentzakis" Swimming Pool, Alexandroupolis; Referees: Chisato Kurosaki (JPN), Jakov Blašković (CRO)
12 April 2026; 13:00	Report	Score by quarters: 3–1, 2–4, 2–3, 4–3			"Demosthenes Michalentzakis" Swimming Pool, Alexandroupolis; Referees: Chisato Kurosaki (JPN), Jakov Blašković (CRO)
12 April 2026; 13:00	Report	Gomila 4	Goals	Argyropoulos 4	"Demosthenes Michalentzakis" Swimming Pool, Alexandroupolis; Referees: Chisato Kurosaki (JPN), Jakov Blašković (CRO)

12 April 2026; 15:00	Report	Italy	12–9	Hungary	"Demosthenes Michalentzakis" Swimming Pool, Alexandroupolis; Referees: Levon Dermendjian (USA), Pavle Kiš (SRB)
12 April 2026; 15:00	Report	Score by quarters: 1–1, 4–4, 5–3, 2–1			"Demosthenes Michalentzakis" Swimming Pool, Alexandroupolis; Referees: Levon Dermendjian (USA), Pavle Kiš (SRB)
12 April 2026; 15:00	Report	Gratta 3	Goals	Szalai, Vigvári 2	"Demosthenes Michalentzakis" Swimming Pool, Alexandroupolis; Referees: Levon Dermendjian (USA), Pavle Kiš (SRB)

==== Group D ====
Pos	Team	Pld	W	PW	PL	L	GF	GA	GD	Pts	Qualification
1	Croatia	3	3	0	0	0	41	26	+15	9	Super final
2	Serbia	3	1	0	0	2	34	37	−3	3 (Note: Serbia 3 Pts, +2 GD; United States 3 Pts, +1 GD; Netherlands 3 Pts, −3 GD.)	
3	United States	3	1	0	0	2	37	42	−5	3	
4	Netherlands	3	1	0	0	2	32	39	−7	3	

Source: Microplustiming
Rules for classification: 1) Points; 2) Head-to-head points; 3) Head-to-head goal difference; 4) Head-to-head goals scored; 5) Goal difference.
Notes:

9 April 2026; 13:30	Report	Serbia	12–14	United States	"Demosthenes Michalentzakis" Swimming Pool, Alexandroupolis; Referees: Boris Margeta (SLO), Norbert Ercse (HUN)
9 April 2026; 13:30	Report	Score by quarters: 3–1, 1–5, 4–4, 4–4			"Demosthenes Michalentzakis" Swimming Pool, Alexandroupolis; Referees: Boris Margeta (SLO), Norbert Ercse (HUN)
9 April 2026; 13:30	Report	Gladović 3	Goals	R. Dodd 5	"Demosthenes Michalentzakis" Swimming Pool, Alexandroupolis; Referees: Boris Margeta (SLO), Norbert Ercse (HUN)

9 April 2026; 15:30	Report	Croatia	12–8	Netherlands	"Demosthenes Michalentzakis" Swimming Pool, Alexandroupolis; Referees: Raffaele Colombo (ITA), Konstantions Vasileiou (GRE)
9 April 2026; 15:30	Report	Score by quarters: 3–1, 2–2, 3–2, 4–3			"Demosthenes Michalentzakis" Swimming Pool, Alexandroupolis; Referees: Raffaele Colombo (ITA), Konstantions Vasileiou (GRE)
9 April 2026; 15:30	Report	Brubnjak, Fatović 3	Goals	three players 2	"Demosthenes Michalentzakis" Swimming Pool, Alexandroupolis; Referees: Raffaele Colombo (ITA), Konstantions Vasileiou (GRE)

11 April 2026; 13:30	Report	Croatia	18–12	United States	"Demosthenes Michalentzakis" Swimming Pool, Alexandroupolis; Referees: Boris Margeta (SLO), Raffaele Colombo (ITA)
11 April 2026; 13:30	Report	Score by quarters: 4–2, 4–3, 7–3, 3–4			"Demosthenes Michalentzakis" Swimming Pool, Alexandroupolis; Referees: Boris Margeta (SLO), Raffaele Colombo (ITA)
11 April 2026; 13:30	Report	Žuvela 5	Goals	Irving 4	"Demosthenes Michalentzakis" Swimming Pool, Alexandroupolis; Referees: Boris Margeta (SLO), Raffaele Colombo (ITA)

11 April 2026; 15:30	Report	Serbia	16–12	Netherlands	"Demosthenes Michalentzakis" Swimming Pool, Alexandroupolis; Referees: Norbert Ercse (HUN), Konstantions Vasileiou (GRE)
11 April 2026; 15:30	Report	Score by quarters: 3–2, 4–4, 6–1, 3–5			"Demosthenes Michalentzakis" Swimming Pool, Alexandroupolis; Referees: Norbert Ercse (HUN), Konstantions Vasileiou (GRE)
11 April 2026; 15:30	Report	Jakšić 5	Goals	Ten Broek 3	"Demosthenes Michalentzakis" Swimming Pool, Alexandroupolis; Referees: Norbert Ercse (HUN), Konstantions Vasileiou (GRE)

12 April 2026; 09:00	Report	Serbia	6–11	Croatia	"Demosthenes Michalentzakis" Swimming Pool, Alexandroupolis; Referees: Boris Margeta (SLO), Michiel Zwart (NED)
12 April 2026; 09:00	Report	Score by quarters: 1–5, 1–3, 2–2, 2–1			"Demosthenes Michalentzakis" Swimming Pool, Alexandroupolis; Referees: Boris Margeta (SLO), Michiel Zwart (NED)
12 April 2026; 09:00	Report	Jakšić, Martinović 2	Goals	Kharkov 4	"Demosthenes Michalentzakis" Swimming Pool, Alexandroupolis; Referees: Boris Margeta (SLO), Michiel Zwart (NED)

12 April 2026; 11:00	Report	Netherlands	12–11	United States	"Demosthenes Michalentzakis" Swimming Pool, Alexandroupolis; Referees: Raffaele Colombo (ITA), Konstantinos Vasileiou (GRE)
12 April 2026; 11:00	Report	Score by quarters: 3–3, 3–3, 3–3, 3–2			"Demosthenes Michalentzakis" Swimming Pool, Alexandroupolis; Referees: Raffaele Colombo (ITA), Konstantinos Vasileiou (GRE)
12 April 2026; 11:00	Report	Van der Weijden 5	Goals	C. Dodd 3	"Demosthenes Michalentzakis" Swimming Pool, Alexandroupolis; Referees: Raffaele Colombo (ITA), Konstantinos Vasileiou (GRE)

== Division 2 ==
Division 2
Tournament details
- Host country: Malta
- Venue: 1
- Dates: 7–13 April

Tournament statistics
- Matches played: 73
- Goals scored: 2,101 (28.78 per match)
- Top scorers: (France) Thomas Vernoux (Argentina) Carlos Camnasio (36 goals)

Official website
- www.worldaquatics.com

The Division 2 tournament was held in Msida, Malta, between 7 and 13 April 2026.

The teams were sorted in one league phase, playing three games based on ranking. The top 16 teams of the standings advanced to the knockout stage, where the top two teams qualified for the super final.

All times are (UTC+2).

=== League phase ===
Teams were ranked by average Tournament Performance Index (TPI) points, calculated using the margin of victory/defeat and the strength of opposition, before the other tiebreakers are used.

Pos	Team	Pld	W	PSW	PSL	L	GF	GA	GD	TPI	Qualification
1	Neutral Athletes B (Note: In accordance with sanctions imposed following by the 2022 Russian invasion of Ukraine, athletes from Russia were not permitted to use the name, flag, or anthem of Russian Federation. They instead participated as "Neutral Athletes B (NAB)" and under the World Aquatics flag.)	3	3	0	0	0	62	27	35	85.3	Round of 16
2	Canada	3	3	0	0	0	48	25	23	84.5	Round of 16
3	Australia	3	3	0	0	0	58	30	28	84.1	Round of 16
4	Montenegro	3	3	0	0	0	82	15	67	83	Round of 16
5	Romania	3	3	0	0	0	56	23	33	82.1	Round of 16
6	Germany	2	2	0	0	0	56	20	36	75.6	Round of 16
7	Turkey	3	2	0	1	0	57	35	22	72.5	Round of 16
8	France	3	2	0	0	1	68	35	33	69.3	Round of 16
9	Portugal	3	2	0	0	1	57	31	26	68.7	Round of 16
10	Georgia	3	1	1	0	1	52	36	16	65.7	Round of 16
11	China	3	1	1	0	1	41	36	5	65.3	Round of 16
12	Argentina	3	2	0	0	1	46	41	5	64.6	Round of 16
13	Malta (H)	3	1	0	0	2	40	36	4	61.4	Round of 16
14	Slovakia	2	1	0	0	1	22	22	0	60.2	Round of 16
15	Ukraine	3	1	0	0	2	51	49	2	57	Round of 16
16	Brazil	3	1	0	1	1	34	30	4	54.1	Round of 16
17	Kazakhstan	3	0	0	0	3	21	61	−40	43	
18	Singapore	3	0	0	0	3	20	73	−53	39.8	
19	Poland	2	0	0	0	2	16	55	−39	38.8	
20	Slovenia	3	0	0	0	3	30	49	−19	38.7	
21	Great Britain	3	0	0	0	3	21	82	−61	38.6	
22	Hong Kong	3	0	0	0	3	18	84	−66	36.6	
23	South Africa	3	0	0	0	3	23	84	−61	33.4	
—	~~Japan~~ (Note: Japan withdrew before the tournament.)	—	—	—	—	—	—	—	—	—	Withdrawn

Source: Microplustiming
Rules for classification: 1) Points; 2) Strength of opposition; 3) Head-to-head points; 4) Head-to-head goal difference; 5) Head-to-head goals scored; 6) Goal difference.
(H) Hosts

==== Day 1 ====
7 April 2026; 10:00	Report	Romania	14–9	Slovakia	Tal-Qroqq Sports Complex, Msida; Referees: German Moller (ARG), Eurico Silva (POR)
7 April 2026; 10:00	Report	Score by quarters: 3–2, 3–4, 4–3, 4–0			Tal-Qroqq Sports Complex, Msida; Referees: German Moller (ARG), Eurico Silva (POR)
7 April 2026; 10:00	Report	Georgescu, Iudean 4	Goals	Furman 3	Tal-Qroqq Sports Complex, Msida; Referees: German Moller (ARG), Eurico Silva (POR)

7 April 2026; 11:00	Report	Georgia	16–17	Turkey	Cottonera Indoor Pool, Fgura; Referees: Hendrik Schopp (GER), Lazar Anđelić (SRB)
7 April 2026; 11:00	Report	Score by quarters: 5–4, 3–3, 5–8, 3–2			Cottonera Indoor Pool, Fgura; Referees: Hendrik Schopp (GER), Lazar Anđelić (SRB)
7 April 2026; 11:00	Report	Dadvani, Vasić 4	Goals	Düzenli 5	Cottonera Indoor Pool, Fgura; Referees: Hendrik Schopp (GER), Lazar Anđelić (SRB)

7 April 2026; 11:30	Report	Canada	18–7	Singapore	Tal-Qroqq Sports Complex, Msida; Referees: Dasch Barber (RSA), Róbert Prelovský (SVK)
7 April 2026; 11:30	Report	Score by quarters: 6–1, 4–2, 3–3, 5–1			Tal-Qroqq Sports Complex, Msida; Referees: Dasch Barber (RSA), Róbert Prelovský (SVK)
7 April 2026; 11:30	Report	Pozaric 5	Goals	Rajandra 2	Tal-Qroqq Sports Complex, Msida; Referees: Dasch Barber (RSA), Róbert Prelovský (SVK)

7 April 2026; 13:00	Report	Germany	22–15	Slovenia	Cottonera Indoor Pool, Fgura; Referees: Levan Berishvili (GEO), Massimo Angileri (MLT)
7 April 2026; 13:00	Report	Score by quarters: 5–5, 6–5, 6–2, 5–3			Cottonera Indoor Pool, Fgura; Referees: Levan Berishvili (GEO), Massimo Angileri (MLT)
7 April 2026; 13:00	Report	Strelezkij 6	Goals	Ažbe, Štromajer 3	Cottonera Indoor Pool, Fgura; Referees: Levan Berishvili (GEO), Massimo Angileri (MLT)

7 April 2026; 13:00	Report	South Africa	7–25	Portugal	Tal-Qroqq Sports Complex, Msida; Referees: Wang Leilei (CHN), Franky Chiu (HKG)
7 April 2026; 13:00	Report	Score by quarters: 1–7, 0–6, 2–5, 4–7			Tal-Qroqq Sports Complex, Msida; Referees: Wang Leilei (CHN), Franky Chiu (HKG)
7 April 2026; 13:00	Report	Neser, Welton 2	Goals	Ramos 5	Tal-Qroqq Sports Complex, Msida; Referees: Wang Leilei (CHN), Franky Chiu (HKG)

7 April 2026; 15:00	Report	China	17–8	Great Britain	Cottonera Indoor Pool, Fgura; Referees: Evan Andrews (CAN), Tomaž Kavčič (SLO)
7 April 2026; 15:00	Report	Score by quarters: 2–2, 5–2, 5–2, 5–2			Cottonera Indoor Pool, Fgura; Referees: Evan Andrews (CAN), Tomaž Kavčič (SLO)
7 April 2026; 15:00	Report	Yang Y. 5	Goals	K. Powell, Nesbitt 2	Cottonera Indoor Pool, Fgura; Referees: Evan Andrews (CAN), Tomaž Kavčič (SLO)

7 April 2026; 15:00	Report	Brazil	7–10	Neutral Athletes B	Tal-Qroqq Sports Complex, Msida; Referees: Adrian Alexandrescu (ROU), Jeremy Cheng (SGP)
7 April 2026; 15:00	Report	Score by quarters: 2–1, 0–3, 3–2, 2–4			Tal-Qroqq Sports Complex, Msida; Referees: Adrian Alexandrescu (ROU), Jeremy Cheng (SGP)
7 April 2026; 15:00	Report	R. Real 6	Goals	Merkulov, Zakirov 3	Tal-Qroqq Sports Complex, Msida; Referees: Adrian Alexandrescu (ROU), Jeremy Cheng (SGP)

7 April 2026; 16:30	Report	Montenegro	27–6	Kazakhstan	Tal-Qroqq Sports Complex, Msida; Referees: Gabor Boros (AUS), Gökhan Ciğer (TUR)
7 April 2026; 16:30	Report	Score by quarters: 7–0, 8–2, 5–2, 7–2			Tal-Qroqq Sports Complex, Msida; Referees: Gabor Boros (AUS), Gökhan Ciğer (TUR)
7 April 2026; 16:30	Report	Gojković 5	Goals	Madimar 2	Tal-Qroqq Sports Complex, Msida; Referees: Gabor Boros (AUS), Gökhan Ciğer (TUR)

7 April 2026; 17:00	Report	Argentina	26–6	Hong Kong	Cottonera Indoor Pool, Fgura; Referees: Yuri Maciel (BRA), Yurii-Danylo Fedun (UKR)
7 April 2026; 17:00	Report	Score by quarters: 5–3, 7–0, 6–1, 8–2			Cottonera Indoor Pool, Fgura; Referees: Yuri Maciel (BRA), Yurii-Danylo Fedun (UKR)
7 April 2026; 17:00	Report	Camnasio 6	Goals	Cheng, Cheung 2	Cottonera Indoor Pool, Fgura; Referees: Yuri Maciel (BRA), Yurii-Danylo Fedun (UKR)

7 April 2026; 18:00	Report	Australia	15–12	Malta	Tal-Qroqq Sports Complex, Msida; Referees: Julien Bourges (FRA), Maxim Gerasimov (GBR)
7 April 2026; 18:00	Report	Score by quarters: 2–4, 6–3, 5–2, 2–3			Tal-Qroqq Sports Complex, Msida; Referees: Julien Bourges (FRA), Maxim Gerasimov (GBR)
7 April 2026; 18:00	Report	Constantin-Bicari 4	Goals	Camilleri, Nagaev 3	Tal-Qroqq Sports Complex, Msida; Referees: Julien Bourges (FRA), Maxim Gerasimov (GBR)

7 April 2026; 19:00	Report	France	27–13	Ukraine	Cottonera Indoor Pool, Fgura; Referees: Siniša Matijašević (MNE), Janusz Gottschalk (POL)
7 April 2026; 19:00	Report	Score by quarters: 5–3, 9–2, 4–4, 9–4			Cottonera Indoor Pool, Fgura; Referees: Siniša Matijašević (MNE), Janusz Gottschalk (POL)
7 April 2026; 19:00	Report	Vernoux 8	Goals	Ashanin, Dzhura 4	Cottonera Indoor Pool, Fgura; Referees: Siniša Matijašević (MNE), Janusz Gottschalk (POL)

==== Day 2 ====
8 April 2026; 10:00	Report	Great Britain	9–21	Neutral Athletes B	Tal-Qroqq Sports Complex, Msida; Referees: Hendrik Schopp (GER), Janusz Gottschalk (POL)
8 April 2026; 10:00	Report	Score by quarters: 0–3, 2–4, 4–8, 3–6			Tal-Qroqq Sports Complex, Msida; Referees: Hendrik Schopp (GER), Janusz Gottschalk (POL)
8 April 2026; 10:00	Report	Blenkinship, R. Powell 3	Goals	three players 4	Tal-Qroqq Sports Complex, Msida; Referees: Hendrik Schopp (GER), Janusz Gottschalk (POL)

8 April 2026; 11:00	Report	Ukraine	24–7	Hong Kong	Cottonera Indoor Pool, Fgura; Referees: Wang Leilei (CHN), Tomaž Kavčič (SLO)
8 April 2026; 11:00	Report	Score by quarters: 6–3, 7–1, 8–2, 3–1			Cottonera Indoor Pool, Fgura; Referees: Wang Leilei (CHN), Tomaž Kavčič (SLO)
8 April 2026; 11:00	Report	Dzhura 6	Goals	Ching, Cheng H. 2	Cottonera Indoor Pool, Fgura; Referees: Wang Leilei (CHN), Tomaž Kavčič (SLO)

8 April 2026; 11:30	Report	Georgia	12–12; PSO: 5–3	Brazil	Tal-Qroqq Sports Complex, Msida; Referees: Evan Andrews (CAN), Maxim Gerasimov (GBR)
8 April 2026; 11:30	Report	Score by quarters: 4–3, 2–1, 2–3, 4–5			Tal-Qroqq Sports Complex, Msida; Referees: Evan Andrews (CAN), Maxim Gerasimov (GBR)
8 April 2026; 11:30	Report	Jakhaia 3	Goals	R. Real 5	Tal-Qroqq Sports Complex, Msida; Referees: Evan Andrews (CAN), Maxim Gerasimov (GBR)

8 April 2026; 13:00	Report	China	12–16	Australia	Cottonera Indoor Pool, Fgura; Referees: Adrian Alexandrescu (ROU), Dasch Barber (RSA)
8 April 2026; 13:00	Report	Score by quarters: 3–2, 3–4, 4–5, 2–5			Cottonera Indoor Pool, Fgura; Referees: Adrian Alexandrescu (ROU), Dasch Barber (RSA)
8 April 2026; 13:00	Report	Chen 4	Goals	Byrnes 8	Cottonera Indoor Pool, Fgura; Referees: Adrian Alexandrescu (ROU), Dasch Barber (RSA)

8 April 2026; 13:00	Report	Portugal	26–7	Poland	Tal-Qroqq Sports Complex, Msida; Referees: Yuri Maciel (BRA), Gökhan Ciğer (TUR)
8 April 2026; 13:00	Report	Score by quarters: 4–2, 6–1, 7–1, 9–3			Tal-Qroqq Sports Complex, Msida; Referees: Yuri Maciel (BRA), Gökhan Ciğer (TUR)
8 April 2026; 13:00	Report	Lopes, Ramos 7	Goals	Grabiński, Krakowiak 2	Tal-Qroqq Sports Complex, Msida; Referees: Yuri Maciel (BRA), Gökhan Ciğer (TUR)

8 April 2026; 15:00	Report	Romania	28–5	South Africa	Cottonera Indoor Pool, Fgura; Referees: Yurii-Danylo Fedun (UKR), Róbert Prelovský (SVK)
8 April 2026; 15:00	Report	Score by quarters: 8–1, 9–2, 5–1, 6–1			Cottonera Indoor Pool, Fgura; Referees: Yurii-Danylo Fedun (UKR), Róbert Prelovský (SVK)
8 April 2026; 15:00	Report	Georgescu 5	Goals	Neser 2	Cottonera Indoor Pool, Fgura; Referees: Yurii-Danylo Fedun (UKR), Róbert Prelovský (SVK)

8 April 2026; 15:00	Report	Slovenia	8–13	Slovakia	Tal-Qroqq Sports Complex, Msida; Referees: Julien Bourges (FRA), Siniša Matijašević (MNE)
8 April 2026; 15:00	Report	Score by quarters: 2–2, 1–2, 2–5, 3–4			Tal-Qroqq Sports Complex, Msida; Referees: Julien Bourges (FRA), Siniša Matijašević (MNE)
8 April 2026; 15:00	Report	Štromajer 5	Goals	Tkáč 4	Tal-Qroqq Sports Complex, Msida; Referees: Julien Bourges (FRA), Siniša Matijašević (MNE)

8 April 2026; 16:30	Report	Turkey	28–7	Singapore	Tal-Qroqq Sports Complex, Msida; Referees: Gabor Boros (AUS), Franky Chiu (HKG)
8 April 2026; 16:30	Report	Score by quarters: 7–1, 6–0, 8–4, 7–2			Tal-Qroqq Sports Complex, Msida; Referees: Gabor Boros (AUS), Franky Chiu (HKG)
8 April 2026; 16:30	Report	Yutmaz 8	Goals	Lee C., Rajandra 2	Tal-Qroqq Sports Complex, Msida; Referees: Gabor Boros (AUS), Franky Chiu (HKG)

8 April 2026; 17:00	Report	Argentina	5–21	Montenegro	Cottonera Indoor Pool, Fgura; Referees: Eurico Silva (POR), Adil Aimbetov (KAZ)
8 April 2026; 17:00	Report	Score by quarters: 2–4, 0–8, 2–5, 1–4			Cottonera Indoor Pool, Fgura; Referees: Eurico Silva (POR), Adil Aimbetov (KAZ)
8 April 2026; 17:00	Report	Camnasio 3	Goals	Moskov, Radović 4	Cottonera Indoor Pool, Fgura; Referees: Eurico Silva (POR), Adil Aimbetov (KAZ)

8 April 2026; 18:00	Report	Malta	19–7	Kazakhstan	Tal-Qroqq Sports Complex, Msida; Referees: Levan Berishvili (GEO), German Moller (ARG)
8 April 2026; 18:00	Report	Score by quarters: 4–2, 4–2, 8–2, 3–1			Tal-Qroqq Sports Complex, Msida; Referees: Levan Berishvili (GEO), German Moller (ARG)
8 April 2026; 18:00	Report	Nagaev 5	Goals	Akhmetov, Shonzhigitov 2	Tal-Qroqq Sports Complex, Msida; Referees: Levan Berishvili (GEO), German Moller (ARG)

8 April 2026; 19:00	Report	France	12–13	Canada	Cottonera Indoor Pool, Fgura; Referees: Lazar Anđelić (SRB), Jeremy Cheng (SGP)
8 April 2026; 19:00	Report	Score by quarters: 3–2, 2–2, 3–5, 4–4			Cottonera Indoor Pool, Fgura; Referees: Lazar Anđelić (SRB), Jeremy Cheng (SGP)
8 April 2026; 19:00	Report	Vernoux 4	Goals	three players 3	Cottonera Indoor Pool, Fgura; Referees: Lazar Anđelić (SRB), Jeremy Cheng (SGP)

==== Day 3 ====
9 April 2026; 10:00	Report	Australia	27–6	Singapore	Tal-Qroqq Sports Complex, Msida; Referees: Yuri Maciel (BRA), Janusz Gottschalk (POL)
9 April 2026; 10:00	Report	Score by quarters: 6–2, 8–1, 5–2, 8–1			Tal-Qroqq Sports Complex, Msida; Referees: Yuri Maciel (BRA), Janusz Gottschalk (POL)
9 April 2026; 10:00	Report	Glanznig 6	Goals	Goh W. 3	Tal-Qroqq Sports Complex, Msida; Referees: Yuri Maciel (BRA), Janusz Gottschalk (POL)

9 April 2026; 11:00	Report	Germany	34–5	Hong Kong	Cottonera Indoor Pool, Fgura; Referees: Jeremy Cheng (SGP), Maxim Gerasimov (GBR)
9 April 2026; 11:00	Report	Score by quarters: 11–0, 8–1, 8–1, 7–3			Cottonera Indoor Pool, Fgura; Referees: Jeremy Cheng (SGP), Maxim Gerasimov (GBR)
9 April 2026; 11:00	Report	Andruszkiewicz, Chiru 6	Goals	Ching 3	Cottonera Indoor Pool, Fgura; Referees: Jeremy Cheng (SGP), Maxim Gerasimov (GBR)

9 April 2026; 11:30	Report	Canada	17–6	Portugal	Tal-Qroqq Sports Complex, Msida; Referees: Gabor Boros (AUS), Tomaž Kavčič (SLO)
9 April 2026; 11:30	Report	Score by quarters: 6–1, 4–1, 7–3, 0–1			Tal-Qroqq Sports Complex, Msida; Referees: Gabor Boros (AUS), Tomaž Kavčič (SLO)
9 April 2026; 11:30	Report	Pozaric 4	Goals	Ramos 3	Tal-Qroqq Sports Complex, Msida; Referees: Gabor Boros (AUS), Tomaž Kavčič (SLO)

9 April 2026; 13:00	Report	Georgia	24–7	Slovenia	Cottonera Indoor Pool, Fgura; Referees: Adrian Alexandrescu (ROU), Gökhan Ciğer (TUR)
9 April 2026; 13:00	Report	Score by quarters: 6–1, 6–4, 6–1, 6–1			Cottonera Indoor Pool, Fgura; Referees: Adrian Alexandrescu (ROU), Gökhan Ciğer (TUR)
9 April 2026; 13:00	Report	Jakhaia 6	Goals	three players 2	Cottonera Indoor Pool, Fgura; Referees: Adrian Alexandrescu (ROU), Gökhan Ciğer (TUR)

9 April 2026; 13:00	Report	South Africa	11–31	Neutral Athletes B	Tal-Qroqq Sports Complex, Msida; Referees: Siniša Matijašević (MNE), Adil Aimbetov (KAZ)
9 April 2026; 13:00	Report	Score by quarters: 2–8, 4–8, 3–7, 2–8			Tal-Qroqq Sports Complex, Msida; Referees: Siniša Matijašević (MNE), Adil Aimbetov (KAZ)
9 April 2026; 13:00	Report	Neser 5	Goals	Balakirev 7	Tal-Qroqq Sports Complex, Msida; Referees: Siniša Matijašević (MNE), Adil Aimbetov (KAZ)

9 April 2026; 15:00	Report	China	12–12; PSO: 4–1	Turkey	Cottonera Indoor Pool, Fgura; Referees: German Moller (ARG), Julien Bourges (FRA)
9 April 2026; 15:00	Report	Score by quarters: 5–4, 2–1, 3–5, 2–2			Cottonera Indoor Pool, Fgura; Referees: German Moller (ARG), Julien Bourges (FRA)
9 April 2026; 15:00	Report	Chen 5	Goals	Colak, Düzenli 4	Cottonera Indoor Pool, Fgura; Referees: German Moller (ARG), Julien Bourges (FRA)

9 April 2026; 15:00	Report	Brazil	15–8	Kazakhstan	Tal-Qroqq Sports Complex, Msida; Referees: Dasch Barber (RSA), Franky Chiu (HKG)
9 April 2026; 15:00	Report	Score by quarters: 1–0, 4–3, 5–3, 5–2			Tal-Qroqq Sports Complex, Msida; Referees: Dasch Barber (RSA), Franky Chiu (HKG)
9 April 2026; 15:00	Report	R. Real 4	Goals	Shakenov 5	Tal-Qroqq Sports Complex, Msida; Referees: Dasch Barber (RSA), Franky Chiu (HKG)

9 April 2026; 16:30	Report	Montenegro	34–4	Great Britain	Tal-Qroqq Sports Complex, Msida; Referees: Wang Leilei (CHN), Róbert Prelovský (SVK)
9 April 2026; 16:30	Report	Score by quarters: 5–1, 8–1, 10–0, 11–2			Tal-Qroqq Sports Complex, Msida; Referees: Wang Leilei (CHN), Róbert Prelovský (SVK)
9 April 2026; 16:30	Report	Radović 6	Goals	four players 1	Tal-Qroqq Sports Complex, Msida; Referees: Wang Leilei (CHN), Róbert Prelovský (SVK)

9 April 2026; 17:00	Report	Argentina	15–14	Ukraine	Cottonera Indoor Pool, Fgura; Referees: Evan Andrews (CAN), Massimo Angileri (MLT)
9 April 2026; 17:00	Report	Score by quarters: 4–4, 5–3, 3–4, 3–3			Cottonera Indoor Pool, Fgura; Referees: Evan Andrews (CAN), Massimo Angileri (MLT)
9 April 2026; 17:00	Report	Camnasio 6	Goals	Labyk 5	Cottonera Indoor Pool, Fgura; Referees: Evan Andrews (CAN), Massimo Angileri (MLT)

9 April 2026; 18:00	Report	Romania	14–9	Malta	Tal-Qroqq Sports Complex, Msida; Referees: Hendrik Schopp (GER), Lazar Anđelić (SRB)
9 April 2026; 18:00	Report	Score by quarters: 6–2, 3–3, 2–0, 3–4			Tal-Qroqq Sports Complex, Msida; Referees: Hendrik Schopp (GER), Lazar Anđelić (SRB)
9 April 2026; 18:00	Report	Georgescu 4	Goals	Nagaev 5	Tal-Qroqq Sports Complex, Msida; Referees: Hendrik Schopp (GER), Lazar Anđelić (SRB)

9 April 2026; 19:00	Report	France	29–9	Poland	Cottonera Indoor Pool, Fgura; Referees: Levan Berishvili (GEO), Eurico Silva (POR)
9 April 2026; 19:00	Report	Score by quarters: 8–1, 8–3, 8–2, 5–3			Cottonera Indoor Pool, Fgura; Referees: Levan Berishvili (GEO), Eurico Silva (POR)
9 April 2026; 19:00	Report	De Reviers, Vernoux 4	Goals	Kędzior 3	Cottonera Indoor Pool, Fgura; Referees: Levan Berishvili (GEO), Eurico Silva (POR)

=== Final phase ===
==== Bracket ====
Round of 16
10 April
1 Neutral Athletes B	16
16 Brazil	10
10 April
8 France	23
9 Portugal	9
10 April
4 Montenegro	23
13 Malta	6
10 April
5 Romania	21
12 Argentina	11
10 April
2 Canada	13
15 Ukraine	17
10 April
7 Turkey	12
10 Georgia	19
10 April
3 Australia	18
14 Slovakia	9
10 April
6 Germany	14
13 China	8

Quarter-finals
11 April
1 Neutral Athletes B	13
8 France	14
11 April
4 Montenegro	14
5 Romania	8
11 April
15 Ukraine	9
10 Georgia	20
11 April
3 Australia	11
6 Germany	14

Semi-finals
12 April
8 France	11
4 Montenegro	15
12 April
10 Georgia	19
6 Germany	13

Final
13 April
4 Montenegro	19
10 Georgia	17
Third place
13 April
8 France	6
6 Germany	8

Fifth place bracket

5–8th place semifinals
12 April
1 Neutral Athletes B	12
5 Romania	16
12 April
15 Ukraine	15
3 Australia	21

Fifth place
13 April
5 Romania	11 (3)
3 Australia (PSO)	11 (5)
Seventh place
13 April
1 Neutral Athletes B	w/o
15 Ukraine

Ninth place bracket

9–16th place quarterfinals
11 April
16 Brazil	14
9 Portugal	9
11 April
13 Malta	16
12 Argentina	15
11 April
2 Canada	15
7 Turkey	14
11 April
14 Slovakia	16
13 China	13

9–12th place semifinals
12 April
16 Brazil	12
13 Malta	13
12 April
2 Canada	14
14 Slovakia	12

Ninth place
13 April
13 Malta	12
2 Canada	14
Eleventh place
13 April
16 Brazil	13
14 Slovakia	12

13th place bracket

13–16th place semifinals
12 April
9 Portugal	15
12 Argentina	20
12 April
7 Turkey	22
13 China	19

13th place
13 April
12 Argentina	13
7 Turkey	11
15th place
13 April
9 Portugal	13
13 China	15

17th place bracket

17–23rd place quarterfinals
10 April
20 Slovenia	13
21 Great Britain	10
10 April
18 Singapore	16
23 South Africa	10
10 April
19 Poland	20
22 Hong Kong	11

17–20th place semifinals
11 April
17 Kazakhstan	13
20 Slovenia	18
11 April
18 Singapore	10
19 Poland	18

17th place
12 April
20 Slovenia	11
19 Poland	7
19th place
12 April
17 Kazakhstan	14
18 Singapore	11

21st place bracket

21st–23rd place semifinal
11 April
23 South Africa	23
22 Hong Kong	22

21st place
12 April
21 Great Britain	18
23 South Africa	8

==== Round of 16 ====
10 April 2026; 10:00	Report	Turkey	12–19	Georgia	Tal-Qroqq Sports Complex, Msida; Referees: Adrian Alexandrescu (ROU), German Moller (ARG)
10 April 2026; 10:00	Report	Score by quarters: 4–2, 3–5, 2–5, 3–7			Tal-Qroqq Sports Complex, Msida; Referees: Adrian Alexandrescu (ROU), German Moller (ARG)
10 April 2026; 10:00	Report	Caner 5	Goals	Vasić 4	Tal-Qroqq Sports Complex, Msida; Referees: Adrian Alexandrescu (ROU), German Moller (ARG)

10 April 2026; 11:00	Report	Neutral Athletes B	16–10	Brazil	Cottonera Indoor Pool, Fgura; Referees: Levan Berishvili (GEO), Gabor Boros (AUS)
10 April 2026; 11:00	Report	Score by quarters: 2–2, 5–2, 5–3, 4–3			Cottonera Indoor Pool, Fgura; Referees: Levan Berishvili (GEO), Gabor Boros (AUS)
10 April 2026; 11:00	Report	Dereviankin 4	Goals	R. Real 4	Cottonera Indoor Pool, Fgura; Referees: Levan Berishvili (GEO), Gabor Boros (AUS)

10 April 2026; 11:30	Report	France	23–9	Portugal	Tal-Qroqq Sports Complex, Msida; Referees: Janusz Gottschalk (POL), Yurii-Danylo Fedun (UKR)
10 April 2026; 11:30	Report	Score by quarters: 6–1, 6–4, 4–1, 7–3			Tal-Qroqq Sports Complex, Msida; Referees: Janusz Gottschalk (POL), Yurii-Danylo Fedun (UKR)
10 April 2026; 11:30	Report	Bouet 6	Goals	Lopes, Ramos 2	Tal-Qroqq Sports Complex, Msida; Referees: Janusz Gottschalk (POL), Yurii-Danylo Fedun (UKR)

10 April 2026; 13:00	Report	Australia	18–9	Slovakia	Cottonera Indoor Pool, Fgura; Referees: Maxim Gerasimov (GBR), Franky Chiu (HKG)
10 April 2026; 13:00	Report	Score by quarters: 4–2, 6–3, 5–3, 3–1			Cottonera Indoor Pool, Fgura; Referees: Maxim Gerasimov (GBR), Franky Chiu (HKG)
10 April 2026; 13:00	Report	Mercep 5	Goals	Furman 3	Cottonera Indoor Pool, Fgura; Referees: Maxim Gerasimov (GBR), Franky Chiu (HKG)

10 April 2026; 15:00	Report	Canada	13–17	Ukraine	Cottonera Indoor Pool, Fgura; Referees: Massimo Angileri (MLT), Róbert Prelovský (SVK)
10 April 2026; 15:00	Report	Score by quarters: 2–5, 5–4, 4–3, 2–5			Cottonera Indoor Pool, Fgura; Referees: Massimo Angileri (MLT), Róbert Prelovský (SVK)
10 April 2026; 15:00	Report	Côté, Gardijan 3	Goals	Ashanin 4	Cottonera Indoor Pool, Fgura; Referees: Massimo Angileri (MLT), Róbert Prelovský (SVK)

10 April 2026; 17:00	Report	Romania	21–11	Argentina	Cottonera Indoor Pool, Fgura; Referees: Dasch Barber (RSA), Adil Aimbetov (KAZ)
10 April 2026; 17:00	Report	Score by quarters: 5–3, 6–3, 6–2, 4–3			Cottonera Indoor Pool, Fgura; Referees: Dasch Barber (RSA), Adil Aimbetov (KAZ)
10 April 2026; 17:00	Report	Neamtu 6	Goals	Camnasio 5	Cottonera Indoor Pool, Fgura; Referees: Dasch Barber (RSA), Adil Aimbetov (KAZ)

10 April 2026; 18:00	Report	Montenegro	23–6	Malta	Tal-Qroqq Sports Complex, Msida; Referees: Julien Bourges (FRA), Wang Leilei (CHN)
10 April 2026; 18:00	Report	Score by quarters: 6–1, 6–0, 7–3, 4–2			Tal-Qroqq Sports Complex, Msida; Referees: Julien Bourges (FRA), Wang Leilei (CHN)
10 April 2026; 18:00	Report	Moskov 6	Goals	J. Cachia 2	Tal-Qroqq Sports Complex, Msida; Referees: Julien Bourges (FRA), Wang Leilei (CHN)

10 April 2026; 19:00	Report	Germany	14–8	China	Cottonera Indoor Pool, Fgura; Referees: Eurico Silva (POR), Tomaž Kavčič (SLO)
10 April 2026; 19:00	Report	Score by quarters: 2–3, 6–0, 2–2, 4–3			Cottonera Indoor Pool, Fgura; Referees: Eurico Silva (POR), Tomaž Kavčič (SLO)
10 April 2026; 19:00	Report	Metten 4	Goals	Lyu, Yang S. 2	Cottonera Indoor Pool, Fgura; Referees: Eurico Silva (POR), Tomaž Kavčič (SLO)

==== 17–23rd place quarterfinals ====
10 April 2026; 13:00	Report	Singapore	16–10	South Africa	Tal-Qroqq Sports Complex, Msida; Referees: Hendrik Schopp (GER), Evan Andrews (CAN)
10 April 2026; 13:00	Report	Score by quarters: 2–2, 6–1, 4–3, 4–4			Tal-Qroqq Sports Complex, Msida; Referees: Hendrik Schopp (GER), Evan Andrews (CAN)
10 April 2026; 13:00	Report	M. Goh 4	Goals	three players 2	Tal-Qroqq Sports Complex, Msida; Referees: Hendrik Schopp (GER), Evan Andrews (CAN)

10 April 2026; 15:00	Report	Poland	20–11	Hong Kong	Tal-Qroqq Sports Complex, Msida; Referees: Lazar Anđelić (SRB), Jeremy Cheng (SGP)
10 April 2026; 15:00	Report	Score by quarters: 5–2, 5–5, 4–2, 6–2			Tal-Qroqq Sports Complex, Msida; Referees: Lazar Anđelić (SRB), Jeremy Cheng (SGP)
10 April 2026; 15:00	Report	Grabiński 5	Goals	Cheng 4	Tal-Qroqq Sports Complex, Msida; Referees: Lazar Anđelić (SRB), Jeremy Cheng (SGP)

10 April 2026; 16:30	Report	Slovenia	13–10	Great Britain	Tal-Qroqq Sports Complex, Msida; Referees: Siniša Matijašević (MNE), Gökhan Ciğer (TUR)
10 April 2026; 16:30	Report	Score by quarters: 0–2, 5–1, 3–2, 5–5			Tal-Qroqq Sports Complex, Msida; Referees: Siniša Matijašević (MNE), Gökhan Ciğer (TUR)
10 April 2026; 16:30	Report	three players 3	Goals	R. Powell 4	Tal-Qroqq Sports Complex, Msida; Referees: Siniša Matijašević (MNE), Gökhan Ciğer (TUR)

==== 9–16th place quarterfinals ====
11 April 2026; 11:30	Report	Slovakia	16–13	China	Tal-Qroqq Sports Complex, Msida; Referees: Adrian Alexandrescu (ROU), Dasch Barber (RSA)
11 April 2026; 11:30	Report	Score by quarters: 5–2, 2–6, 6–4, 3–1			Tal-Qroqq Sports Complex, Msida; Referees: Adrian Alexandrescu (ROU), Dasch Barber (RSA)
11 April 2026; 11:30	Report	Furman 6	Goals	Cai, Chen 4	Tal-Qroqq Sports Complex, Msida; Referees: Adrian Alexandrescu (ROU), Dasch Barber (RSA)

11 April 2026; 17:00	Report	Brazil	14–9	Portugal	Cottonera Indoor Pool, Fgura; Referees: Jeremy Cheng (SGP), Wang Leilei (CHN)
11 April 2026; 17:00	Report	Score by quarters: 5–2, 4–4, 5–1, 0–2			Cottonera Indoor Pool, Fgura; Referees: Jeremy Cheng (SGP), Wang Leilei (CHN)
11 April 2026; 17:00	Report	Oliveira, R. Real 3	Goals	Ramos 3	Cottonera Indoor Pool, Fgura; Referees: Jeremy Cheng (SGP), Wang Leilei (CHN)

11 April 2026; 19:00	Report	Canada	15–14	Turkey	Cottonera Indoor Pool, Fgura; Referees: Yurii-Danylo Fedun (UKR), Franky Chiu (HKG)
11 April 2026; 19:00	Report	Score by quarters: 1–5, 5–5, 5–2, 4–2			Cottonera Indoor Pool, Fgura; Referees: Yurii-Danylo Fedun (UKR), Franky Chiu (HKG)
11 April 2026; 19:00	Report	Merrill 4	Goals	Caner 4	Cottonera Indoor Pool, Fgura; Referees: Yurii-Danylo Fedun (UKR), Franky Chiu (HKG)

11 April 2026; 19:30	Report	Malta	16–15	Argentina	Tal-Qroqq Sports Complex, Msida; Referees: Hendrik Schopp (GER), Siniša Matijašević (MNE)
11 April 2026; 19:30	Report	Score by quarters: 3–3, 5–4, 4–4, 4–4			Tal-Qroqq Sports Complex, Msida; Referees: Hendrik Schopp (GER), Siniša Matijašević (MNE)
11 April 2026; 19:30	Report	Nagaev 7	Goals	Tilatti 4	Tal-Qroqq Sports Complex, Msida; Referees: Hendrik Schopp (GER), Siniša Matijašević (MNE)

==== Quarterfinals ====
11 April 2026; 13:00	Report	Neutral Athletes B	13–14	France	Tal-Qroqq Sports Complex, Msida; Referees: Eurico Silva (POR), German Moller (ARG)
11 April 2026; 13:00	Report	Score by quarters: 2–2, 3–6, 2–2, 6–4			Tal-Qroqq Sports Complex, Msida; Referees: Eurico Silva (POR), German Moller (ARG)
11 April 2026; 13:00	Report	Merkulov 4	Goals	Vernoux 8	Tal-Qroqq Sports Complex, Msida; Referees: Eurico Silva (POR), German Moller (ARG)

11 April 2026; 15:00	Report	Ukraine	9–20	Georgia	Tal-Qroqq Sports Complex, Msida; Referees: Julien Bourges (FRA), Lazar Anđelić (SRB)
11 April 2026; 15:00	Report	Score by quarters: 2–3, 4–5, 1–5, 2–7			Tal-Qroqq Sports Complex, Msida; Referees: Julien Bourges (FRA), Lazar Anđelić (SRB)
11 April 2026; 15:00	Report	Ashanin 3	Goals	Dadvani 5	Tal-Qroqq Sports Complex, Msida; Referees: Julien Bourges (FRA), Lazar Anđelić (SRB)

11 April 2026; 16:30	Report	Australia	11–14	Germany	Tal-Qroqq Sports Complex, Msida; Referees: Massimo Angileri (MLT), Maxim Gerasimov (GBR)
11 April 2026; 16:30	Report	Score by quarters: 3–3, 5–4, 2–2, 1–5			Tal-Qroqq Sports Complex, Msida; Referees: Massimo Angileri (MLT), Maxim Gerasimov (GBR)
11 April 2026; 16:30	Report	Byrnes 4	Goals	Strelezkij 6	Tal-Qroqq Sports Complex, Msida; Referees: Massimo Angileri (MLT), Maxim Gerasimov (GBR)

11 April 2026; 18:00	Report	Montenegro	14–8	Romania	Tal-Qroqq Sports Complex, Msida; Referees: Gabor Boros (AUS), Levan Berishvili (GEO)
11 April 2026; 18:00	Report	Score by quarters: 2–3, 6–2, 2–2, 4–1			Tal-Qroqq Sports Complex, Msida; Referees: Gabor Boros (AUS), Levan Berishvili (GEO)
11 April 2026; 18:00	Report	Gojković 5	Goals	Iudean, Neamtu 2	Tal-Qroqq Sports Complex, Msida; Referees: Gabor Boros (AUS), Levan Berishvili (GEO)

==== 21st–23rd place semifinal ====
11 April 2026; 11:00	Report	South Africa	23–22	Hong Kong	Cottonera Indoor Pool, Fgura; Referees: Janusz Gottschalk (POL), Gökhan Ciğer (TUR)
11 April 2026; 11:00	Report	Score by quarters: 7–4, 6–7, 5–8, 5–3			Cottonera Indoor Pool, Fgura; Referees: Janusz Gottschalk (POL), Gökhan Ciğer (TUR)
11 April 2026; 11:00	Report	Neser 6	Goals	Cheng 8	Cottonera Indoor Pool, Fgura; Referees: Janusz Gottschalk (POL), Gökhan Ciğer (TUR)

==== 17–20th place semifinals ====
11 April 2026; 13:00	Report	Kazakhstan	13–18	Slovenia	Cottonera Indoor Pool, Fgura; Referees: Róbert Prelovský (SVK), Yuri Maciel (BRA)
11 April 2026; 13:00	Report	Score by quarters: 1–4, 3–1, 5–7, 4–6			Cottonera Indoor Pool, Fgura; Referees: Róbert Prelovský (SVK), Yuri Maciel (BRA)
11 April 2026; 13:00	Report	Shakenov 6	Goals	Štromajer, Troppan 4	Cottonera Indoor Pool, Fgura; Referees: Róbert Prelovský (SVK), Yuri Maciel (BRA)

11 April 2026; 15:00	Report	Singapore	10–18	Poland	Cottonera Indoor Pool, Fgura; Referees: Tomaž Kavčič (SLO), Evan Andrews (CAN)
11 April 2026; 15:00	Report	Score by quarters: 4–3, 2–4, 2–6, 2–5			Cottonera Indoor Pool, Fgura; Referees: Tomaž Kavčič (SLO), Evan Andrews (CAN)
11 April 2026; 15:00	Report	M. Goh, Lok 3	Goals	Maciejewski 6	Cottonera Indoor Pool, Fgura; Referees: Tomaž Kavčič (SLO), Evan Andrews (CAN)

==== 13–16th place semifinals ====
12 April 2026; 17:00	Report	Portugal	15–20	Argentina	Cottonera Indoor Pool, Fgura; Referees: Róbert Prelovský (SVK), Franky Chiu (HKG)
12 April 2026; 17:00	Report	Score by quarters: 3–3, 4–5, 3–7, 5–5			Cottonera Indoor Pool, Fgura; Referees: Róbert Prelovský (SVK), Franky Chiu (HKG)
12 April 2026; 17:00	Report	P. Sousa 6	Goals	Camnasio 7	Cottonera Indoor Pool, Fgura; Referees: Róbert Prelovský (SVK), Franky Chiu (HKG)

12 April 2026; 19:00	Report	Turkey	22–19	China	Cottonera Indoor Pool, Fgura; Referees: Evan Andrews (CAN), Dasch Barber (RSA)
12 April 2026; 19:00	Report	Score by quarters: 4–5, 8–3, 5–6, 5–5			Cottonera Indoor Pool, Fgura; Referees: Evan Andrews (CAN), Dasch Barber (RSA)
12 April 2026; 19:00	Report	Düzenli 9	Goals	Chen 6	Cottonera Indoor Pool, Fgura; Referees: Evan Andrews (CAN), Dasch Barber (RSA)

==== 9–12th place semifinals ====
12 April 2026; 11:30	Report	Canada	14–12	Slovakia	Tal-Qroqq Sports Complex, Msida; Referees: Lazar Anđelić (SRB), Gabor Boros (AUS)
12 April 2026; 11:30	Report	Score by quarters: 4–4, 4–1, 3–6, 3–1			Tal-Qroqq Sports Complex, Msida; Referees: Lazar Anđelić (SRB), Gabor Boros (AUS)
12 April 2026; 11:30	Report	Côté 4	Goals	Furman 7	Tal-Qroqq Sports Complex, Msida; Referees: Lazar Anđelić (SRB), Gabor Boros (AUS)

12 April 2026; 19:30	Report	Brazil	12–13	Malta	Tal-Qroqq Sports Complex, Msida; Referees: Tomaž Kavčič (SLO), Janusz Gottschalk (POL)
12 April 2026; 19:30	Report	Score by quarters: 2–2, 4–3, 3–5, 3–3			Tal-Qroqq Sports Complex, Msida; Referees: Tomaž Kavčič (SLO), Janusz Gottschalk (POL)
12 April 2026; 19:30	Report	P. Real 3	Goals	Nagaev 5	Tal-Qroqq Sports Complex, Msida; Referees: Tomaž Kavčič (SLO), Janusz Gottschalk (POL)

==== 5–8th place semifinals ====
12 April 2026; 13:00	Report	Neutral Athletes B	12–16	Romania	Tal-Qroqq Sports Complex, Msida; Referees: Julien Bourges (FRA), Hendrik Schopp (GER)
12 April 2026; 13:00	Report	Score by quarters: 2–5, 1–4, 2–4, 7–3			Tal-Qroqq Sports Complex, Msida; Referees: Julien Bourges (FRA), Hendrik Schopp (GER)
12 April 2026; 13:00	Report	Usov, Zakirov 3	Goals	Georgescu 5	Tal-Qroqq Sports Complex, Msida; Referees: Julien Bourges (FRA), Hendrik Schopp (GER)

12 April 2026; 15:00	Report	Ukraine	15–21	Australia	Tal-Qroqq Sports Complex, Msida; Referees: Levan Berishvili (GEO), Siniša Matijašević (MNE)
12 April 2026; 15:00	Report	Score by quarters: 5–4, 5–6, 2–8, 3–3			Tal-Qroqq Sports Complex, Msida; Referees: Levan Berishvili (GEO), Siniša Matijašević (MNE)
12 April 2026; 15:00	Report	Ashanin, Labyk 4	Goals	Mercep 6	Tal-Qroqq Sports Complex, Msida; Referees: Levan Berishvili (GEO), Siniša Matijašević (MNE)

==== Semifinals ====
12 April 2026; 16:30	Report	France	11–15	Montenegro	Tal-Qroqq Sports Complex, Msida; Referees: Adrian Alexandrescu (ROU), Maxim Gerasimov (GBR)
12 April 2026; 16:30	Report	Score by quarters: 2–4, 3–6, 2–2, 4–3			Tal-Qroqq Sports Complex, Msida; Referees: Adrian Alexandrescu (ROU), Maxim Gerasimov (GBR)
12 April 2026; 16:30	Report	Vernoux 7	Goals	Moskov 6	Tal-Qroqq Sports Complex, Msida; Referees: Adrian Alexandrescu (ROU), Maxim Gerasimov (GBR)

12 April 2026; 18:00	Report	Georgia	19–13	Germany	Tal-Qroqq Sports Complex, Msida; Referees: German Moller (ARG), Eurico Silva (POR)
12 April 2026; 18:00	Report	Score by quarters: 4–3, 4–3, 5–1, 6–6			Tal-Qroqq Sports Complex, Msida; Referees: German Moller (ARG), Eurico Silva (POR)
12 April 2026; 18:00	Report	Akhvlediani 4	Goals	Bozic 4	Tal-Qroqq Sports Complex, Msida; Referees: German Moller (ARG), Eurico Silva (POR)

==== 21st place game ====
12 April 2026; 11:00	Report	Great Britain	18–8	South Africa	Cottonera Indoor Pool, Fgura; Referees: Jeremy Cheng (SGP), Adil Aimbetov (KAZ)
12 April 2026; 11:00	Report	Score by quarters: 2–2, 5–2, 5–1, 6–3			Cottonera Indoor Pool, Fgura; Referees: Jeremy Cheng (SGP), Adil Aimbetov (KAZ)
12 April 2026; 11:00	Report	K. Powell 4	Goals	three players 2	Cottonera Indoor Pool, Fgura; Referees: Jeremy Cheng (SGP), Adil Aimbetov (KAZ)

==== 19th place game ====
12 April 2026; 13:00	Report	Kazakhstan	14–11	Singapore	Cottonera Indoor Pool, Fgura; Referees: Gökhan Ciğer (TUR), Yuri Maciel (BRA)
12 April 2026; 13:00	Report	Score by quarters: 5–3, 4–2, 3–1, 2–5			Cottonera Indoor Pool, Fgura; Referees: Gökhan Ciğer (TUR), Yuri Maciel (BRA)
12 April 2026; 13:00	Report	Shakenov 3	Goals	M. Goh 5	Cottonera Indoor Pool, Fgura; Referees: Gökhan Ciğer (TUR), Yuri Maciel (BRA)

==== 17th place game ====
12 April 2026; 15:00	Report	Slovenia	11–7	Poland	Cottonera Indoor Pool, Fgura; Referees: Yurii-Danylo Fedun (UKR), Wang Leilei (CHN)
12 April 2026; 15:00	Report	Score by quarters: 3–1, 2–1, 2–1, 4–3			Cottonera Indoor Pool, Fgura; Referees: Yurii-Danylo Fedun (UKR), Wang Leilei (CHN)
12 April 2026; 15:00	Report	Lipnik 3	Goals	Kowalewski 2	Cottonera Indoor Pool, Fgura; Referees: Yurii-Danylo Fedun (UKR), Wang Leilei (CHN)

==== 15th place game ====
13 April 2026; 09:00	Report	Portugal	13–15	China	Tal-Qroqq Sports Complex, Msida; Referees: Gabor Boros (AUS), Tomaž Kavčič (SLO)
13 April 2026; 09:00	Report	Score by quarters: 3–6, 5–2, 4–4, 1–3			Tal-Qroqq Sports Complex, Msida; Referees: Gabor Boros (AUS), Tomaž Kavčič (SLO)
13 April 2026; 09:00	Report	Ramos 5	Goals	Chen 7	Tal-Qroqq Sports Complex, Msida; Referees: Gabor Boros (AUS), Tomaž Kavčič (SLO)

==== 13th place game ====
13 April 2026; 10:30	Report	Argentina	13–11	Turkey	Tal-Qroqq Sports Complex, Msida; Referees: Levan Berishvili (GEO), Massimo Angileri (MLT)
13 April 2026; 10:30	Report	Score by quarters: 4–3, 5–3, 3–1, 1–4			Tal-Qroqq Sports Complex, Msida; Referees: Levan Berishvili (GEO), Massimo Angileri (MLT)
13 April 2026; 10:30	Report	Camnasio 6	Goals	five players 2	Tal-Qroqq Sports Complex, Msida; Referees: Levan Berishvili (GEO), Massimo Angileri (MLT)

==== Eleventh place game ====
13 April 2026; 12:00	Report	Brazil	13–12	Slovakia	Tal-Qroqq Sports Complex, Msida; Referees: Hendrik Schopp (GER), Dasch Barber (RSA)
13 April 2026; 12:00	Report	Score by quarters: 2–2, 3–4, 3–4, 5–2			Tal-Qroqq Sports Complex, Msida; Referees: Hendrik Schopp (GER), Dasch Barber (RSA)
13 April 2026; 12:00	Report	Andrade 4	Goals	Furman 4	Tal-Qroqq Sports Complex, Msida; Referees: Hendrik Schopp (GER), Dasch Barber (RSA)

==== Ninth place game ====
13 April 2026; 13:30	Report	Malta	12–14	Canada	Tal-Qroqq Sports Complex, Msida; Referees: Róbert Prelovský (SVK), Siniša Matijašević (MNE)
13 April 2026; 13:30	Report	Score by quarters: 1–5, 1–4, 3–2, 7–3			Tal-Qroqq Sports Complex, Msida; Referees: Róbert Prelovský (SVK), Siniša Matijašević (MNE)
13 April 2026; 13:30	Report	Nagaev, Valletta 3	Goals	O'Donnell 4	Tal-Qroqq Sports Complex, Msida; Referees: Róbert Prelovský (SVK), Siniša Matijašević (MNE)

==== Seventh place game ====
13 April 2026 (Note: The game was counted as a 5–0 walkover win for NAB.); 15:00	Report	Neutral Athletes B	5–0	Ukraine	Tal-Qroqq Sports Complex, Msida

==== Fifth place game ====
13 April 2026; 16:30	Report	Romania	11–11; PSO: 3–5	Australia	Tal-Qroqq Sports Complex, Msida; Referees: Evan Andrews (CAN), Julien Bourges (FRA)
13 April 2026; 16:30	Report	Score by quarters: 3–3, 5–2, 1–2, 2–4			Tal-Qroqq Sports Complex, Msida; Referees: Evan Andrews (CAN), Julien Bourges (FRA)
13 April 2026; 16:30	Report	Neamtu 3	Goals	Byrnes, Mercep 3	Tal-Qroqq Sports Complex, Msida; Referees: Evan Andrews (CAN), Julien Bourges (FRA)

==== Third place game ====
13 April 2026; 18:00	Report	France	6–8	Germany	Tal-Qroqq Sports Complex, Msida; Referees: German Moller (ARG), Lazar Anđelić (SRB)
13 April 2026; 18:00	Report	Score by quarters: 2–2, 1–0, 1–3, 2–3			Tal-Qroqq Sports Complex, Msida; Referees: German Moller (ARG), Lazar Anđelić (SRB)
13 April 2026; 18:00	Report	Vernoux 2	Goals	Hofmann, Metten 2	Tal-Qroqq Sports Complex, Msida; Referees: German Moller (ARG), Lazar Anđelić (SRB)

==== Final ====
13 April 2026; 19:30	Report	Montenegro	19–17	Georgia	Tal-Qroqq Sports Complex, Msida; Referees: Maxim Gerasimov (GBR), Eurico Silva (POR)
13 April 2026; 19:30	Report	Score by quarters: 6–4, 2–6, 4–3, 7–4			Tal-Qroqq Sports Complex, Msida; Referees: Maxim Gerasimov (GBR), Eurico Silva (POR)
13 April 2026; 19:30	Report	Matković 6	Goals	Akhvlediani 5	Tal-Qroqq Sports Complex, Msida; Referees: Maxim Gerasimov (GBR), Eurico Silva (POR)

== Super final ==
2026 World Aquatics Men's Water Polo World Cup
Tournament details
- Host country: Australia
- Venue: 1 (in 1 host city)
- Dates: 23–26 July
- Teams: 8

Final positions
- Champions: Greece (1st title)
- Runners-up: Hungary
- Third place: Italy
- Fourth place: Australia

Tournament statistics
- Matches played: 12
- Goals scored: 338 (28.17 per match)
- Top scorers: (Croatia) Vlaho Pavlić (13 goals)

Awards
- Best player: (Greece) Stylianos Argyropoulos
- Best goalkeeper: (Greece) Panagiotis Tzortzatos

Official website
- www.worldaquatics.com

The tournament took place between 23 and 26 July 2026 in Sydney, Australia.

=== Bracket ===
Quarter-finals
23 July
Spain	18 (3)
Australia (PSO)	18 (5)
23 July
Hungary	16
Croatia	11
23 July
Italy	18
Georgia	12
23 July
Greece	14
Montenegro	13

Semi-finals
25 July
Australia	12
Hungary	13
25 July
Italy	9
Greece	10

Final
26 July
Hungary	14
Greece	15
Third place
26 July
Australia	10
Italy	16

Fifth place bracket

5–8th place semifinals
24 July
Spain	18
Croatia	14
24 July
Georgia	15
Montenegro	18

Fifth place
25 July
Spain (PSO)	12 (5)
Montenegro	12 (4)
Seventh place
25 July
Croatia	18
Georgia	12

All times are local (UTC+10).

=== Quarterfinals ===
23 July 2026; 15:00	Report	Italy	18–12	Georgia	Sydney Olympic Park Aquatic Centre, Sydney; Referees: György Kun (HUN), Zhang Liang (CHN)
23 July 2026; 15:00	Report	Score by quarters: 4–2, 3–3, 6–3, 5–4			Sydney Olympic Park Aquatic Centre, Sydney; Referees: György Kun (HUN), Zhang Liang (CHN)
23 July 2026; 15:00	Report	Condemi, Ferrero 3	Goals	Adeishvili, Dadvani 3	Sydney Olympic Park Aquatic Centre, Sydney; Referees: György Kun (HUN), Zhang Liang (CHN)

23 July 2026; 16:45	Report	Greece	14–13	Montenegro	Sydney Olympic Park Aquatic Centre, Sydney; Referees: Xevi Buch (ESP), Nicholas Hodgers (AUS)
23 July 2026; 16:45	Report	Score by quarters: 7–3, 2–3, 3–4, 2–3			Sydney Olympic Park Aquatic Centre, Sydney; Referees: Xevi Buch (ESP), Nicholas Hodgers (AUS)
23 July 2026; 16:45	Report	Argyropoulos 4	Goals	Gojković 5	Sydney Olympic Park Aquatic Centre, Sydney; Referees: Xevi Buch (ESP), Nicholas Hodgers (AUS)

23 July 2026; 18:30	Report	Spain	18–18; PSO: 3–5	Australia	Sydney Olympic Park Aquatic Centre, Sydney; Referees: Božo Ðuraškovic (MNE), Levan Berishvili (GEO)
23 July 2026; 18:30	Report	Score by quarters: 6–3, 5–6, 5–4, 2–5			Sydney Olympic Park Aquatic Centre, Sydney; Referees: Božo Ðuraškovic (MNE), Levan Berishvili (GEO)
23 July 2026; 18:30	Report	Sanahuja 7	Goals	Mercep 6	Sydney Olympic Park Aquatic Centre, Sydney; Referees: Božo Ðuraškovic (MNE), Levan Berishvili (GEO)

23 July 2026; 20:15	Report	Hungary	16–11	Croatia	Sydney Olympic Park Aquatic Centre, Sydney; Referees: Michiel Zwart (NED), Alessandro Severo (ITA)
23 July 2026; 20:15	Report	Score by quarters: 5–5, 4–3, 4–2, 3–1			Sydney Olympic Park Aquatic Centre, Sydney; Referees: Michiel Zwart (NED), Alessandro Severo (ITA)
23 July 2026; 20:15	Report	Fekete, Vigvári 4	Goals	Ćurković, Pavlić 2	Sydney Olympic Park Aquatic Centre, Sydney; Referees: Michiel Zwart (NED), Alessandro Severo (ITA)

=== 5–8th place semifinals ===
24 July 2026; 15:00	Report	Spain	18–14	Croatia	Sydney Olympic Park Aquatic Centre, Sydney; Referees: Alessandro Severo (ITA), Nicholas Hodgers (AUS)
24 July 2026; 15:00	Report	Score by quarters: 5–4, 6–4, 3–2, 4–4			Sydney Olympic Park Aquatic Centre, Sydney; Referees: Alessandro Severo (ITA), Nicholas Hodgers (AUS)
24 July 2026; 15:00	Report	Biel, Daura 4	Goals	Pavlić 7	Sydney Olympic Park Aquatic Centre, Sydney; Referees: Alessandro Severo (ITA), Nicholas Hodgers (AUS)

24 July 2026; 16:45	Report	Georgia	15–18	Montenegro	Sydney Olympic Park Aquatic Centre, Sydney; Referees: Michiel Zwart (NED), Zhang Liang (CHN)
24 July 2026; 16:45	Report	Score by quarters: 2–5, 3–6, 4–5, 4–4			Sydney Olympic Park Aquatic Centre, Sydney; Referees: Michiel Zwart (NED), Zhang Liang (CHN)
24 July 2026; 16:45	Report	Shushiashvili 4	Goals	Matković, Vučković 3	Sydney Olympic Park Aquatic Centre, Sydney; Referees: Michiel Zwart (NED), Zhang Liang (CHN)

=== Semifinals ===
25 July 2026; 18:30	Report	Australia	12–13	Hungary	Sydney Olympic Park Aquatic Centre, Sydney; Referees: Xevi Buch (ESP), Zhang Liang (CHN)
25 July 2026; 18:30	Report	Score by quarters: 3–2, 2–4, 3–4, 4–3			Sydney Olympic Park Aquatic Centre, Sydney; Referees: Xevi Buch (ESP), Zhang Liang (CHN)
25 July 2026; 18:30	Report	Byrnes 4	Goals	Nagy, Zalánki 3	Sydney Olympic Park Aquatic Centre, Sydney; Referees: Xevi Buch (ESP), Zhang Liang (CHN)

25 July 2026; 20:15	Report	Italy	9–10	Greece	Sydney Olympic Park Aquatic Centre, Sydney; Referees: Michiel Zwart (NED), Álex Márquez (ESP)
25 July 2026; 20:15	Report	Score by quarters: 2–1, 2–4, 2–2, 3–3			Sydney Olympic Park Aquatic Centre, Sydney; Referees: Michiel Zwart (NED), Álex Márquez (ESP)
25 July 2026; 20:15	Report	Carnesecchi 3	Goals	Argyropoulos, Giouvetsis 3	Sydney Olympic Park Aquatic Centre, Sydney; Referees: Michiel Zwart (NED), Álex Márquez (ESP)

=== Seventh place game ===
25 July 2026; 15:00	Report	Croatia	18–12	Georgia	Sydney Olympic Park Aquatic Centre, Sydney; Referees: Jennifer McCall (USA), György Kun (HUN)
25 July 2026; 15:00	Report	Score by quarters: 5–3, 4–3, 6–1, 3–5			Sydney Olympic Park Aquatic Centre, Sydney; Referees: Jennifer McCall (USA), György Kun (HUN)
25 July 2026; 15:00	Report	Brubnjak 5	Goals	five players 2	Sydney Olympic Park Aquatic Centre, Sydney; Referees: Jennifer McCall (USA), György Kun (HUN)

=== Fifth place game ===
25 July 2026; 16:45	Report	Spain	12–12; PSO: 5–4	Montenegro	Sydney Olympic Park Aquatic Centre, Sydney; Referees: Nikolett Sajben (HUN), Alessandro Severo (ITA)
25 July 2026; 16:45	Report	Score by quarters: 2–3, 2–3, 3–4, 5–2			Sydney Olympic Park Aquatic Centre, Sydney; Referees: Nikolett Sajben (HUN), Alessandro Severo (ITA)
25 July 2026; 16:45	Report	three players 3	Goals	Matković, Ukropina 3	Sydney Olympic Park Aquatic Centre, Sydney; Referees: Nikolett Sajben (HUN), Alessandro Severo (ITA)

=== Third place game ===
26 July 2026; 14:30	Report	Australia	10–16	Italy	Sydney Olympic Park Aquatic Centre, Sydney; Referees: Xevi Buch (ESP), György Kun (HUN)
26 July 2026; 14:30	Report	Score by quarters: 1–2, 3–6, 4–3, 2–5			Sydney Olympic Park Aquatic Centre, Sydney; Referees: Xevi Buch (ESP), György Kun (HUN)
26 July 2026; 14:30	Report	Constantin-Bicari, Mercep 3	Goals	Cannella 5	Sydney Olympic Park Aquatic Centre, Sydney; Referees: Xevi Buch (ESP), György Kun (HUN)

=== Final ===
26 July 2026; 18:00	Report	Hungary	14–15	Greece	Sydney Olympic Park Aquatic Centre, Sydney; Referees: Michiel Zwart (NED), Zhang Liang (CHN)
26 July 2026; 18:00	Report	Score by quarters: 3–5, 3–2, 4–4, 4–4			Sydney Olympic Park Aquatic Centre, Sydney; Referees: Michiel Zwart (NED), Zhang Liang (CHN)
26 July 2026; 18:00	Report	Zalánki 4	Goals	Skoumpakis 5	Sydney Olympic Park Aquatic Centre, Sydney; Referees: Michiel Zwart (NED), Zhang Liang (CHN)

== Final standings ==
Rank	Team
Gold medal	Greece
Silver medal	Hungary
Bronze medal	Italy
4	Australia
5	Spain
6	Montenegro
7	Croatia
8	Georgia

- Greece, Italy and Australia qualified for the 2027 World Championship and Hungary qualified for the 2027 World Championship as hosts.

2026 FINA Men's Water Polo World Cup

Greece
First title

Team roster

Panagiotis Tzortzatos (GK), Aris Chalyvopoulos, Dimitris Skoumpakis, Kostas Gkiouvetsis, Stelios Argyropoulos (c), Alexandros Papanastasiou, Vangelis Pouros, Stathis Kalogeropoulos, Zannis Alafragkis, Kostas Kakaris, Dimitris Nikolaidis, Nikos Gardikas, Manos Andreadis (GK), Semir Spachits, Dimitris Chatzis
Head coach: Thodoris Vlachos.

== Awards ==
The following individual awards were announced by World Aquatics following the Super Final:

Award	Recipient
Most valuable player	(Greece) Stylianos Argyropoulos
Best goalkeeper	(Greece) Panagiotis Tzortzatos
Best defender	(Australia) Nathan Power

== See also ==
- 2026 World Aquatics Women's Water Polo World Cup
