= Ádám Nagy (disambiguation) =

Ádám Nagy (born 1995) is a Hungarian footballer.

Ádám Nagy may also refer to:

- Ádám Nagy (water polo) (born 1998), Hungarian water polo player.
