= Raffaele Colombo =

Italian water polo referee

- Born: 25 June 1985 (age 41); Como, Italy
- Occupation: Water polo referee

Raffaele Colombo (born in Como on 25 June 1985) is an Italian international water polo referee, who officiates in European and international competitions under the auspices of World Aquatics and European Aquatics.

== Biography ==
Colombo was born and grew up in Como, Italy.

He has officiated in many national and international competitions, including matches in LEN (now European Aquatics) tournaments and domestic Italian leagues. He has been appointed to officiate games in major European club competitions such as the LEN Champions League and the LEN Euro Cup, as well as international fixtures involving national teams. As part of the international refereeing pool, Colombo has also been involved in tournaments organized by World Aquatics, contributing to the governance of matches at a high competitive level.

Within Italy, he has officiated top-tier matches in the Serie A1 championship and national finals, under the supervision of the Federazione Italiana Nuoto.

In April 2026, he was selected by FINA to officiate games in the top Division 1 of the 2026 FINA Men's Water Polo World Cup, held in Alexandroupolis, Greece.
