= Michiel Zwart =

Dutch water polo referee

- Born: 8 November 1986 (age 40)
- Occupation: Water polo referee

Michiel Zwart (born 8 November 1986) is a Dutch international water polo referee, who has officiated at major global tournaments including the World Aquatics Championships and the Olympic Games.

== Early life ==
Zwart is from Alphen aan den Rijn in The Netherlands. Before becoming a referee, he played water polo for the club AZC in Alphen.

== Refereeing career ==
Zwart has been appointed to officiate in several high-level international matches. Presently, he is ranked among Europe’s top water polo referees, holding an A+ category for men under European Aquatics.

He has refereed matches in the World Aquatics Championships, e.g., in Fukuoka 2023, including the men’s final between Hungary and Greece. He has also officiated Champions League matches and major European finals, such as Euro Cup Final 4 and national finals in the Netherlands.

Zwart was selected by World Aquatics to referee at the 2020 Summer Olympics (held in Tokyo in 2021), officiating multiple men’s and women’s matches. He was also appointed for the 2024 Olympic Games in Paris. Noticeably, in Paris, he refereed the final match of the men’s tournament between Serbia and Croatia.

At the 2025 World Aquatics World Cup Division 1 in Bucharest, and at recent World Championships, Zwart has been frequently appointed as a referee.

== Personal life ==
Zwart is married, and permanently lives in Alphen aan den Rijn, a province of South Holland, The Netherlands. Outside of officiating, Zwart works in an IT-manager role, and balances his regular professional employment with international refereeing commitments.
