= Gareth May =

South African water polo player (born 1996)

Personal information
- Nationality: South Africa
- Born: 11 September 1996 (age 29) Durban, South Africa
- Weight: 135 kg (298 lb)

Sport
- Sport: Water polo

Gareth May (born 11 September 1996) is a South African water polo player. He competed in the 2020 Summer Olympics.
