= Gergő Fekete =

Hungarian water polo player (born 2000)

Gergő János Fekete
Personal information
- Nationality: Hungarian
- Born: 24 June 2000 (age 26) Debrecen, Hungary
- Height: 193 cm (6 ft 4 in)
Medal record
World Championship
Silver medal – second place	2025 Singapore	Team
World Cup
Silver medal – second place	2026 Sydney
European Championship
Silver medal – second place	2026 Belgrade

Gergő János Fekete (born 24 June 2000) is a Hungarian water polo player. He represented Hungary at the 2024 Summer Olympics.
