= Alexandros Papanastasiou (water polo) =

Greek water polo player

Personal information
- Nationality: Greek
- Born: 12 February 1999 (age 27) Athens, Greece
- Height: 1.94 m (6 ft 4 in)
- Weight: 94 kg (207 lb)

Sport
- Sport: Water polo
- Handedness: Right
- Position: Driver
- Current club: Olympiacos

Senior clubs
- Years: Team
- 2017–2018: Palaio Faliro
- 2018–2022: Jug Dubrovnik
- 2022–: Olympiacos
Medal record
Representing Greece
Olympic Games
Silver medal – second place	2020 Tokyo	Team
World Championships
Silver medal – second place	2023 Fukuoka	Team
Bronze medal – third place	2022 Budapest	Team
European Championship
Bronze medal – third place	2026 Belgrade
World Cup
Gold medal – first place	2026 Sydney
FINA World League
Bronze medal – third place	2020 Tbilisi
Youth World Championship
Gold medal – first place	2017 Belgrade
Gold medal – first place	2019 Kuwait
Youth European Championship
Gold medal – first place	2018 Minsk

Alexandros Papanastasiou (born 12 February 1999) is a Greek water polo player. He competed in the 2020 Summer Olympics, where he won a silver medal as a member of the Greek team.

== Honours ==
=== Club ===
Jug Dubrovnik

- Croatian Championship: 2018–19, 2019–20, 2021–22
- Croatian Cup: 2018–19

Olympiacos

- Greek Championship: 2022–23
- Greek Cup: 2022–23, 2023–24

=== Individual ===
- Youth European Championship MVP: 2018 Minsk
- Croatian Championship Left Driver of the Year: 2018–19, 2019–20, 2021–22
- Adriatic League Young Player of the Year: 2018–19
- World Championship Team of the Tournament: 2023
- Member of the World Team by total-waterpolo: 2023
