= Efstathios Kalogeropoulos =

Greek water polo player (born 2001)

Personal information
- Nationality: Greek
- Born: 28 June 2001 (age 25)
- Height: 187 cm (6 ft 2 in)
- Weight: 88 kg (194 lb)
Medal record
World Championship
Bronze medal – third place	2025 Singapore	Team
World Cup
Gold medal – first place	2026 Sydney
European Championship
Bronze medal – third place	2026 Belgrade

Efstathios Kalogeropoulos (born 28 June 2001) is a Greek water polo player. He represented Greece at the 2024 Summer Olympics.
