= Konstantinos Kakaris =

Greek water polo player (born 1999)

Personal information
- Nationality: Greek
- Born: 2 July 1999 (age 27)
- Height: 1.98 m (6 ft 6 in)
- Weight: 110 kg (243 lb)

Sport
- Sport: Water polo
- Position: Center forward
- Current club: Olympiacos
Medal record
Representing Greece
World Championships
Silver medal – second place	2023 Fukuoka	Team
Bronze medal – third place	2022 Budapest	Team
Bronze medal – third place	2025 Singapore	Team
World Cup
Gold medal – first place	2026 Sydney
European Championship
Bronze medal – third place	2026 Belgrade

Konstantinos Kakaris (Greek: Κωνσταντίνος Κάκκαρης, born 2 July 1999) is a Greek water polo player who is a member of Greece men's national water polo team. He was part of the Greek national team that played at the 2024 World Water Polo Championship in Doha.

In January 2026, he was selected in the all-star team of the 2026 Men's European Water Polo Championship held in Belgrade.

He plays for the Hungarian team Ferencvaros, a European powerhouse in water polo. Kakaris has also played for Jug Dubrovnik, Pro Recco and Olympiacos. He is widely considered as one of the best center forwards in water polo worldwide.

== Awards ==
- LEN Champions League Center Forward of the Year: 2023–24, 2024–25
- 2022 World Water Polo Championship All Star Team of the Tournament
- 2024 World Water Polo Championship All Star Team of the Tournament
- 2026 Men's European Water Polo Championship All Star Team of the Championships
