= Dimitrios Skoumpakis =

Greek water polo player

Personal information
- Born: 18 December 1998 (age 27) Chania, Greece
- Height: 2.03 m (6 ft 8 in)
- Weight: 119 kg (262 lb)

Sport
- Sport: Water polo
- Handedness: Right
- Position: Center back
- Current club: Panathinaikos
- Number: 3

Senior clubs
- Years: Team
- 2016–2018: Glyfada
- 2018–2021: Olympiacos
- 2021–2022: Vouliagmeni
- 2022–2025: Novi Beograd
- 2025-: Panathinaikos
Medal record
Representing Greece
Olympic Games
| Silver medal – second place | 2020 Tokyo | Team |
World Championships
| Silver medal – second place | 2023 Fukuoka | Team |
| Bronze medal – third place | 2022 Budapest | Team |
| Bronze medal – third place | 2025 Singapore | Team |
European Championship
| Bronze medal – third place | 2026 Belgrade |
World Cup
| Gold medal – first place | 2026 Sydney |
FINA World League
| Bronze medal – third place | 2020 Tbilisi |
Mediterranean Games
| Silver medal – second place | 2018 Tarragona |
Youth World Championship
| Gold medal – first place | 2017 Belgrade |

Dimitrios Skoumpakis (born 18 December 1998) is a Greek water polo player. He competed in the 2020 Summer Olympics, where he won a silver medal as a member of the Greek team.

As a key member of the Greek men's national team, he has contributed to the country's success in major international competitions, helping Greece establish itself among the world's top water polo nations. In July 2026, he was the MVP of the 2026 World Cup Final game against Hungary, in which Greece won its first gold medal.

== Honours ==
Olympiacos

- LEN Champions League runners-up : 2018–19
- Greek Championship: 2018–19, 2019–20, 2020–21
- Greek Cup: 2018–19, 2019–20, 2020–21
- Greek Super Cup: 2018, 2019, 2020

VK Novi Beograd

- LEN Champions League runners-up: 2022–23, runners-up: 2024–25
- Adriatic League: 2023–24
- Serbian Championship: 2022–23
- Serbian Cup: 2023–24, 2024–2025

=== Individual ===
- Greek Championship Best Defender: 2019–20, 2020–21, 2021–22
- Adriatic League Best Defender: 2023–24
