= Konstantinos Gkiouvetsis =

Greek water polo player

Personal information
- Nationality: Greek
- Born: 19 November 1999 (age 26) Chios, Greece
- Height: 1.91 m (6 ft 3 in)
- Weight: 90 kg (198 lb)

Sport
- Sport: Water polo
- Handedness: Right
- Position: Wing
- Current club: Panathinaikos
- Number: 5

Youth career
- Years: Team
- –2017: NO Chios

Senior clubs
- Years: Team
- 2017–2022: NC Vouliagmeni
- 2022–2025: Panionios
- 2025–: Panathinaikos
Medal record
Men's water polo
Representing Greece
Olympic Games
Silver medal – second place	2020 Tokyo	Team
World Championships
Silver medal – second place	2023 Fukuoka	Team
Bronze medal – third place	2025 Singapore	Team
European Championship
Bronze medal – third place	2026 Belgrade
World Cup
Gold medal – first place	2026 Sydney
FINA World League
Bronze medal – third place	2020 Tbilisi
Youth World Championship
Gold medal – first place	2017 Belgrade
Gold medal – first place	2019 Kuwait
Youth European Championship
Gold medal – first place	2018 Minsk

Konstantinos Gkiouvetsis (Greek: Κωνσταντίνος Γκιουβέτσης; born 19 November 1999) is a Greek international water polo player who plays as a wing for Panathinaikos A.C. and the Greece men's national water polo team.

He was a member of the Greek team that won the silver medal at the 2020 Summer Olympics in Tokyo, the first Olympic medal in the history of the Greece men's national water polo team.

== Early life ==
He was born in Chios on 19 November 1999. He developed through the youth academy of NO Chios before establishing himself as one of Greece's leading young water polo players.

== Career ==
Gkiouvetsis began his senior career with NO Chios. In 2017 he transferred to NC Vouliagmeni, where he became a regular player in the Greek Water Polo League. In 2022 he joined Panionios, helping the club return to the top level of Greek water polo. In 2025 he signed for Panathinaikos.

Gkiouvetsis represented Greece at youth level, winning two FINA World Men's U20 Championship titles in 2017 and 2019. He also won the European Junior Championship with Greece in 2018.

He made his senior international debut in 2020 and was selected for the Greek squad at the postponed 2020 Summer Olympics in Tokyo. Greece reached the Olympic final for the first time before losing to Serbia, earning the silver medal. At the 2023 World Aquatics Championships in Fukuoka, Gkiouvetsis helped Greece reach the final, where the team finished with the silver medal after losing to Hungary in a penalty shootout.

He was also a member of the Greek team that won the bronze medal at the 2025 World Aquatics Championships in Singapore, defeating Serbia in the third-place match. In July 2026, he helped Greece reach to the final of the 2026 FINA Men's Water Polo World Cup, held in Sydney, having a key role in the games, especially in the semifinal game against Italy.

== Honours ==
=== Greece ===
- Olympic Games
  - Silver medal: 2020
- World Aquatics Championships
  - Silver medal: 2023
  - Bronze medal: 2025
- World Cup
  - Gold medal: 2026

=== Greece U20 ===
- World Men's U20 Championship:
  - Gold medal: 2017
  - Gold medal: 2019
