= Ádám Nagy (water polo) =

Hungarian water polo player

Personal information
- Nationality: Hungarian
- Born: 19 May 1998 (age 28) Budapest, Hungary
- Height: 195 cm (6 ft 5 in)
Medal record
World Championship
Silver medal – second place	2025 Singapore	Team
World Cup
Silver medal – second place	2026 Sydney
European Championship
Silver medal – second place	2026 Belgrade

Ádám Nagy (born 19 May 1998) is a Hungarian water polo player. He represented Hungary at the 2024 Summer Olympics.
