= Panagiotis Tzortzatos =

Greek water polo player (born 1992)

Personal information
- Nationality: Greek
- Born: 11 May 1992 (age 34)
- Height: 184 cm (6 ft 0 in)
Medal record
World Championship
Bronze medal – third place	2025 Singapore	Team
Silver medal – second place	2023 Fukuoka	Team
Bronze medal – third place	2022 Budapest	Team
World Cup
Gold medal – first place	2026 Sydney
European Championship
Bronze medal – third place	2026 Belgrade

Panagiotis Tzortzatos (born 11 May 1992) is a Greek water polo player who plays as a goalkeeper.

He represented the national team of Greece at the 2024 Summer Olympics.

In July 2025, he was one of the key players for Greece in the 2025 World Aquatics Championships held in Singapore. Tzortzatos playing in the semifinal against Spain, was the MVP of the game, in which Greece finally lost 11–9. Additionally, he was also selected as the best goalkeeper (all-star team) of the tournament.

In July 2027, at the Super Final of the 2026 World Aquatics Men's Water Polo World Cup, he was selected in the best "All Star Team" of the tournament, which was held in Sydney.
