= Dimitrios Nikolaidis =

Greek water polo player (born 1999)

Personal information
- Nationality: Greek
- Born: 10 June 1999 (age 27)
- Height: 1.94 m (6 ft 4 in)
- Weight: 96 kg (212 lb)

Sport
- Sport: Water polo
- Position: Center Forward
- Current club: Panathinaikos
- Number: 11

Senior clubs
- Years: Team
- 2015–2017: PAOK
- 2017–2019: Olympiacos
- 2019–2021: Brescia
- 2021–2022: Spandau
- 2022–2023: Vouliagmeni
- 2023–2026: Olympiacos
- 2026–: Panathinaikos
Medal record
Representing Greece
World Championships
Silver medal – second place	2023 Fukuoka	Team
Bronze medal – third place	2022 Budapest	Team
Bronze medal – third place	2025 Singapore	Team
World Cup
Gold medal – first place	2026 Sydney
European Championship
Bronze medal – third place	2026 Belgrade
Mediterranean Games
Silver medal – second place	2018 Tarragona	Team
Youth World Championship
Gold medal – first place	2017 Belgrade
Gold medal – first place	2019 Kuwait
Youth European Championship
Gold medal – first place	2018 Minsk

Dimitrios "Dimitris" Nikolaidis (born 10 June 1999) is a Greek water polo player, who is a member of Greece men's national water polo team. He is part of Greece national team that competes at the 2018 European Water Polo Championship in Barcelona. He plays for Italian team Brescia, Nikolaidis won the 2017–18 LEN Champions League with Olympiacos in Genoa

== Honours ==
=== Club ===
Olympiacos

- LEN Champions League: 2017–18; runners-up: 2018–19
- Greek Championship: 2017–18, 2018–19
- Greek Cup: 2023–24
- Greek Super Cup : 2018

AN Brescia

- Serie A1: 2020–21

Spandau

- German Super Cup: 2022

=== Individual ===
- LEN Champions League Center Forward of the Year: 2022–23
