= Nikolaos Gkillas =

Greek water polo player

Personal information
- Native name: Νικόλαος Γκίλλας
- Nationality: Greece
- Born: 21 June 2003 (age 23) Chios, Greece
- Height: 191 cm (6 ft 3 in)

Sport
- Position: Driver
Medal record
World Championship
Bronze medal – third place	2025 Singapore	Team
European Championship
Bronze medal – third place	2026 Belgrade	Team

Nikolaos "Nikos" Gkillas (in Greek: Νικόλαος Γκίλλας; born 21 June 2003) is a Greek water polo player who plays as a driver for Olympiacos, and the Greece men's national team.

== Career ==
In June 2021, Gkillas signed a five-year contract with Olympiacos, joining their senior men's water polo squad as a young international talent.

Gkillas earned promotion from Greece's U20 squad to the men national team and was selected for the squad at the 2023 World Aquatics Championships in Fukuoka. He competed at the 2024 Summer Olympics in Paris, where Greece finished fifth. In April 2025, he played in the World Aquatics Men's Water Polo World Cup gold-medal match versus Spain in Podgorica, where Greece eventually got the silver medal.

In July 2025, he competed in the World Championships held in Singapore, helping Greece national team to prevail in the bronze-medal game against Serbia.
