= Montenegro at the 2025 World Aquatics Championships =

- Flag of Montenegro
- World Aquatics code: MNE
- National federation: Montenegro Swimming Federation

in Singapore
- Competitors: 17 in 2 sports
- Medals: Gold 0 Silver 0 Bronze 0 Total 0

World Aquatics Championships appearances (overview)
- 2007; 2009; 2011; 2013; 2015; 2017; 2019; 2022; 2023; 2024; 2025

Other related appearances
- Yugoslavia (1973–1991); Serbia and Montenegro (1998–2005)

Montenegro competed at the 2025 World Aquatics Championships in Singapore from July 11 to August 3, 2025.

== Competitors ==
The following is the list of competitors in the Championships.

Sport	Men	Women	Total
Swimming	1	1	2
Water polo	15	0	15
Total	16	1	17

== Swimming ==
Montenegro entered 2 swimmers.

Men

Athlete	Event	Heat		Semi-final		Final	
Athlete	Event	Time	Rank	Time	Rank	Time	Rank
Miloš Milenković	50 m butterfly	23.88	37	Did not advance			
Miloš Milenković	100 m butterfly	53.74	44	Did not advance			

Women

Athlete	Event	Heat		Semi-final		Final	
Athlete	Event	Time	Rank	Time	Rank	Time	Rank
Jovana Kuljača	50 m freestyle	27.22	53	Did not advance			
Jovana Kuljača	100 m freestyle	1:00.49	55	Did not advance			

== Water polo ==
Summary

Team	Event	Group stage				Playoff	Quarterfinal	Semi-final	Final / BM	
Team	Event	Opposition Score	Opposition Score	Opposition Score	Rank	Opposition Score	Opposition Score	Opposition Score	Opposition Score	Rank
Montenegro	Men's tournament	Greece; W 10–9	Croatia; L 11–33	China; W 13–8	2 P/Off	Canada; W 22–10	Spain; L 5–14	Italy; W 12–8	Croatia; L 13–19	6

=== Men's tournament ===
Team roster

The following is the Montenegrin roster.

Head coach: Dejan Savić

- 1 Petar Tešanović GK
- 2 Dmitrii Kholod FP
- 3 Đuro Radović FP
- 4 Dimitrije Obradović FP
- 5 Aljoša Macic FP
- 6 Jovan Vujović FP
- 7 Savo Ćetković FP
- 8 Filip Gardašević FP
- 9 Miroslav Perković FP
- 10 Dušan Banićević FP
- 11 Dušan Matković FP
- 12 Vasilije Radović FP
- 13 Lazar Andrić GK
- 14 Balša Vučković FP
- 15 Strahinja Gojković FP

Group play

Pos	Team	Pld	W	PSW	PSL	L	GF	GA	GD	Pts	Qualification
1	Croatia	3	3	0	0	0	48	26	+22	9	Quarterfinals
2	Montenegro	3	2	0	0	1	34	30	+4	6	Playoffs
3	Greece	3	1	0	0	2	44	25	+19	3	Playoffs
4	China	3	0	0	0	3	19	64	−45	0	13–16th place semifinals

Source: Omegatiming
Rules for classification: 1) points; 2) head-to-head points; 3) head-to-head goal difference; 4) head-to-head number of goals scored; 5) Goal difference.

12 July 2025; 19:10	Report	Montenegro	10–9	Greece	OCBC Aquatic Centre, Singapore; Referees: Tamás Kovács-Csatlós (HUN), David Gómez (ESP)
12 July 2025; 19:10	Report	Score by quarters: 5–3, 2–3, 1–1, 2–2			OCBC Aquatic Centre, Singapore; Referees: Tamás Kovács-Csatlós (HUN), David Gómez (ESP)
12 July 2025; 19:10	Report	Gardašević, Radović 3	Goals	Gkillas 3	OCBC Aquatic Centre, Singapore; Referees: Tamás Kovács-Csatlós (HUN), David Gómez (ESP)

14 July 2025; 17:35	Report	Croatia	13–11	Montenegro	OCBC Aquatic Centre, Singapore; Referees: Michiel Zwart (NED), Ivan Raković (SRB)
14 July 2025; 17:35	Report	Score by quarters: 3–2, 2–3, 3–2, 5–4			OCBC Aquatic Centre, Singapore; Referees: Michiel Zwart (NED), Ivan Raković (SRB)
14 July 2025; 17:35	Report	Bukić, Fatović 3	Goals	Banićević, Radović 3	OCBC Aquatic Centre, Singapore; Referees: Michiel Zwart (NED), Ivan Raković (SRB)

16 July 2025; 12:10	Report	China	8–13	Montenegro	OCBC Aquatic Centre, Singapore; Referees: Dasch Barber (RSA), Tamás Kovács-Csatlós (HUN)
16 July 2025; 12:10	Report	Score by quarters: 0–3, 2–2, 3–3, 3–5			OCBC Aquatic Centre, Singapore; Referees: Dasch Barber (RSA), Tamás Kovács-Csatlós (HUN)
16 July 2025; 12:10	Report	Chen Z. 3	Goals	four players 2	OCBC Aquatic Centre, Singapore; Referees: Dasch Barber (RSA), Tamás Kovács-Csatlós (HUN)

Playoffs

18 July 2025; 20:45	Report	Canada	10–22	Montenegro	OCBC Aquatic Centre, Singapore; Referees: Nicholas Hodgers (AUS), Scott Voltz (USA)
18 July 2025; 20:45	Report	Score by quarters: 3–7, 0–5, 4–5, 3–5			OCBC Aquatic Centre, Singapore; Referees: Nicholas Hodgers (AUS), Scott Voltz (USA)
18 July 2025; 20:45	Report	D'Souza, O'Donnell 3	Goals	Ćetković 5	OCBC Aquatic Centre, Singapore; Referees: Nicholas Hodgers (AUS), Scott Voltz (USA)

Quarterfinals

20 July 2025; 17:35	Report	Spain	14–5	Montenegro	OCBC Aquatic Centre, Singapore; Referees: Tamás Kovács-Csatlós (HUN), Ivan Raković (SRB)
20 July 2025; 17:35	Report	Score by quarters: 4–3, 4–1, 3–0, 3–1			OCBC Aquatic Centre, Singapore; Referees: Tamás Kovács-Csatlós (HUN), Ivan Raković (SRB)
20 July 2025; 17:35	Report	Sanahuja 6	Goals	five players 1	OCBC Aquatic Centre, Singapore; Referees: Tamás Kovács-Csatlós (HUN), Ivan Raković (SRB)

5th–8th place semifinals

22 July 2025; 16:00	Report	Italy	8–12	Montenegro	OCBC Aquatic Centre, Singapore; Referees: Germán Moller (ARG), Georgios Stavridis (GRE)
22 July 2025; 16:00	Report	Score by quarters: 0–3, 3–4, 1–2, 4–3			OCBC Aquatic Centre, Singapore; Referees: Germán Moller (ARG), Georgios Stavridis (GRE)
22 July 2025; 16:00	Report	Di Fulvio, Di Somma 2	Goals	Vukotić 4	OCBC Aquatic Centre, Singapore; Referees: Germán Moller (ARG), Georgios Stavridis (GRE)

Eleventh place game

24 July 2025; 20:00	Report	Montenegro	13–19	Croatia	OCBC Aquatic Centre, Singapore; Referees: Frank Ohme (GER), Scott Volz (GER)
24 July 2025; 20:00	Report	Score by quarters: 3–3, 3–2, 2–8, 5–6			OCBC Aquatic Centre, Singapore; Referees: Frank Ohme (GER), Scott Volz (GER)
24 July 2025; 20:00	Report	Gardašević 3	Goals	Zuvela 5	OCBC Aquatic Centre, Singapore; Referees: Frank Ohme (GER), Scott Volz (GER)
