= Montenegro at the 2016 Summer Olympics =

- IOC code: MNE
- NOC: Montenegrin Olympic Committee
- Website: www.cok.me(in Montenegrin)

in Rio de Janeiro
- Competitors: 35 in 7 sports
- Flag bearer: Bojana Popović
- Medals: Gold 0 Silver 0 Bronze 0 Total 0

Summer Olympics appearances (overview)
- 2008; 2012; 2016; 2020; 2024; 2028

Other related appearances
- Yugoslavia (1920–1992W); Independent Olympic Participants (1992S); Serbia and Montenegro (1996–2006)

Montenegro competed at the 2016 Summer Olympics in Rio de Janeiro, Brazil, from 5 to 21 August 2016. This was the nation's third consecutive appearance at the Summer Olympics since it gained independence from Serbia in 2006.

Montenegrin Olympic Committee sent a team of 35 athletes, 18 women and 17 men, to compete in seven different sports at the Olympics, matching the nation's roster size with London 2012. Women's handball and men's water polo were the only team-based sports in which Montenegro had representatives at the Games. Among the sports represented by the athletes, Montenegro marked its Olympic debut in tennis.

The Montenegrin team featured a number of returning Olympians; seven of them have attended in every edition of the Games since Montenegro's official debut eight years earlier, including six water polo players, led by captain Predrag Jokić, and half-middleweight judoka Srđan Mrvaljević (men's 81 kg). Meanwhile, handball team captain Bojana Popović, who helped her fellow players deliver a historic silver-medal finish for Montenegro in London four years earlier, became the nation's first ever female athlete to carry the flag in the opening ceremony.

Montenegro narrowly missed an opportunity to add another medal to its Olympic treasury in Rio de Janeiro, as the men's water polo team, led by Jokić, lost to the Italians for the bronze with a score 10–12.

== Athletics ==
Montenegrin athletes have so far achieved qualifying standards in the following athletics events (up to a maximum of 3 athletes in each event):

Key

- Note – Ranks given for track events are within the athlete's heat only
- Q = Qualified for the next round
- q = Qualified for the next round as a fastest loser or, in field events, by position without achieving the qualifying target
- NR = National record
- N/A = Round not applicable for the event
- Bye = Athlete not required to compete in round

Track & road events

Athlete	Event	Final	
Athlete	Event	Result	Rank
Slađana Perunović	Women's marathon	DNF	

Field events

Athlete	Event	Qualification		Final	
Athlete	Event	Distance	Position	Distance	Position
Danijel Furtula	Men's discus throw	NM	—	did not advance	

== Handball ==
Summary

Key:

- ET – After extra time
- P – Match decided by penalty-shootout.

Team	Event	Group Stage						Quarterfinal	Semifinal	Final / BM	
Team	Event	Opposition Score	Opposition Score	Opposition Score	Opposition Score	Opposition Score	Rank	Opposition Score	Opposition Score	Opposition Score	Rank
Montenegro women's	Women's tournament	Spain; L 19–25	Angola; L 25–27	Romania; L 21–25	Norway; L 19–28	Brazil; L 23–29	6	did not advance			11

=== Women's tournament ===
The Montenegrin women's handball team qualified for the Olympics by virtue of a top two finish at the second meet of the Olympic Qualification Tournament in Aarhus, Denmark.

Team roster

The following is the Montenegrin roster in the women's handball tournament of the 2016 Summer Olympics.

Head coach: Dragan Adžić

No.	Pos.	Name	Date of birth (age)	Height	App.	Goals	Club
1	GK	Marina Vukčević	24 August 1993 (aged 22)	1.78 m	90	0	(France) Metz Handball
2	RW	Radmila Miljanić-Petrović	19 April 1988 (aged 28)	1.57 m	127	180	(Montenegro) Budućnost
4	RW	Jovanka Radičević	23 October 1986 (aged 29)	1.69 m	134	709	(North Macedonia) Vardar
8	RW	Marija Jovanović	26 December 1985 (aged 30)	1.82 m	132	507	(France) Issy-Paris Hand
9	LB	Djurdjina Jauković	24 February 1997 (aged 19)	1.85 m	31	67	(Montenegro) Budućnost
10	CB	Anđela Bulatović	15 January 1987 (aged 29)	1.75 m	117	176	(Hungary) Érd
15	RB	Andrea Klikovac	5 May 1991 (aged 25)	1.74 m	50	20	(North Macedonia) Vardar
17	LB	Bojana Popović	20 November 1979 (aged 36)	1.85 m	49	311	(Montenegro) Budućnost
22	GK	Sonja Barjaktarović	11 September 1986 (aged 29)	1.80 m	129	0	(Turkey) Bursa Osmangazi Bld. SK
32	RB	Katarina Bulatović	15 November 1984 (aged 31)	1.86 m	69	397	(Montenegro) Budućnost
66	P	Ema Ramusović	28 November 1996 (aged 19)	1.82 m	29	20	(Montenegro) Budućnost
77	LW	Majda Mehmedović	25 May 1990 (aged 26)	1.69 m	95	213	(Romania) CSM București
88	LW	Biljana Pavićević	12 May 1988 (aged 28)	1.70 m	51	71	(Montenegro) Budućnost
90	LB	Milena Knežević	12 March 1990 (aged 26)	1.78 m	122	350	(Montenegro) Budućnost
92	P	Suzana Lazović	28 January 1992 (aged 24)	1.76 m	92	105	(Montenegro) Budućnost

Group play

Pos	Team	Pld	W	D	L	GF	GA	GD	Pts	Qualification
1	Brazil (H)	5	4	0	1	138	117	+21	8	Quarter-finals
2	Norway	5	4	0	1	141	121	+20	8	Quarter-finals
3	Spain	5	3	0	2	125	116	+9	6	Quarter-finals
4	Angola	5	2	0	3	116	128	−12	4	Quarter-finals
5	Romania	5	2	0	3	108	119	−11	4	
6	Montenegro	5	0	0	5	107	134	−27	0	

Source: IHF
Rules for classification: 1) Points; 2) Head-to-head points; 3) Head-to-head goal difference; 4) Head-to-head goals scored; 5) Goal difference; 6) Goals scored; 7) Draw.
(H) Hosts

6 August 2016; 16:40	Montenegro	19–25	Spain	Future Arena, Rio de Janeiro; Attendance: 8,115; Referees: Bonaventura, Bonaventura (FRA)
6 August 2016; 16:40	K. Bulatović 5	(10–14)	four players 4	Future Arena, Rio de Janeiro; Attendance: 8,115; Referees: Bonaventura, Bonaventura (FRA)
6 August 2016; 16:40	2× (yellow card) 4× (suspension)	Report	3× (yellow card) 1× (suspension)	Future Arena, Rio de Janeiro; Attendance: 8,115; Referees: Bonaventura, Bonaventura (FRA)

8 August 2016; 21:50	Angola	27–25	Montenegro	Future Arena, Rio de Janeiro; Referees: Alpaidze, Berekzina (RUS)
8 August 2016; 21:50	Guialo 7	(12–12)	K. Bulatović 9	Future Arena, Rio de Janeiro; Referees: Alpaidze, Berekzina (RUS)
8 August 2016; 21:50	2× (yellow card) 8× (suspension) 1× (red card)	Report	2× (yellow card) 4× (suspension)	Future Arena, Rio de Janeiro; Referees: Alpaidze, Berekzina (RUS)

10 August 2016; 11:30	Romania	25–21	Montenegro	Future Arena, Rio de Janeiro; Referees: Rashed, El-Sayed (EGY)
10 August 2016; 11:30	Neagu 10	(11–9)	K. Bulatović 9	Future Arena, Rio de Janeiro; Referees: Rashed, El-Sayed (EGY)
10 August 2016; 11:30	3× (yellow card) 4× (suspension)	Report	4× (yellow card) 4× (suspension)	Future Arena, Rio de Janeiro; Referees: Rashed, El-Sayed (EGY)

12 August 2016; 16:40	Montenegro	19–28	Norway	Future Arena, Rio de Janeiro; Referees: Coulibaly, Diabaté (CIV)
12 August 2016; 16:40	Jauković 5	(11–16)	Mørk 6	Future Arena, Rio de Janeiro; Referees: Coulibaly, Diabaté (CIV)
12 August 2016; 16:40	2× (yellow card) 5× (suspension)	Report	3× (yellow card) 4× (suspension)	Future Arena, Rio de Janeiro; Referees: Coulibaly, Diabaté (CIV)

14 August 2016; 09:30	Montenegro	23–29	Brazil	Future Arena, Rio de Janeiro; Referees: Mousaviyan, Kolahdouzan (IRI)
14 August 2016; 09:30	Pavićević 6	(10–12)	Belo 6	Future Arena, Rio de Janeiro; Referees: Mousaviyan, Kolahdouzan (IRI)
14 August 2016; 09:30	4× (yellow card) 5× (suspension)	Report	3× (yellow card) 3× (suspension)	Future Arena, Rio de Janeiro; Referees: Mousaviyan, Kolahdouzan (IRI)

== Judo ==
Montenegro has received an invitation from the Tripartite Commission to send a judoka competing in the men's half-middleweight category (81 kg) to the Olympics.

Athlete	Event	Round of 64	Round of 32	Round of 16	Quarterfinals	Semifinals	Repechage	Final / BM	
Athlete	Event	Opposition Result	Opposition Result	Opposition Result	Opposition Result	Opposition Result	Opposition Result	Opposition Result	Rank
Srđan Mrvaljević	Men's −81 kg	Bye	Duminică (MDA); L 000–002	did not advance					

== Sailing ==
Montenegro has qualified one boat in the Laser class through the individual fleet World Championships.

Athlete	Event	Race											Net points	Final rank
Athlete	Event	1	2	3	4	5	6	7	8	9	10	M*	Net points	Final rank
Milivoj Dukić	Men's Laser	12	26	~~35~~	24	33	19	32	34	33	29	EL	232	29

M = Medal race; EL = Eliminated – did not advance into the medal race

== Swimming ==
Montenegro has received a Universality invitation from FINA to send two swimmers (one male and one female) to the Olympics, signifying the nation's return to the sport after an eight-year hiatus.

Athlete	Event	Heat		Semifinal		Final	
Athlete	Event	Time	Rank	Time	Rank	Time	Rank
Maksim Inić	Men's 50 m freestyle	23.88	51	did not advance			
Jovana Terzić	Women's 100 m freestyle	59.59	42	did not advance			

== Tennis ==
Montenegro has entered one tennis player for the first time into the Olympic tournament. Danka Kovinić (world no. 54) qualified directly for the women's singles as one of the top 56 eligible players in the WTA World Rankings as of June 6, 2016.

Athlete	Event	Round of 64	Round of 32	Round of 16	Quarterfinals	Semifinals	Final / BM	
Athlete	Event	Opposition Score	Opposition Score	Opposition Score	Opposition Score	Opposition Score	Opposition Score	Rank
Danka Kovinić	Women's singles	Keys (USA); L 3–6, 3–6	did not advance					

== Water polo ==
Summary

Key:

- FT – After full time.
- P – Match decided by penalty-shootout.

Team	Event	Group Stage						Quarterfinal	Semifinal	Final / BM	
Team	Event	Opposition Score	Opposition Score	Opposition Score	Opposition Score	Opposition Score	Rank	Opposition Score	Opposition Score	Opposition Score	Rank
Montenegro men's	Men's tournament	France; W 7–4	Croatia; L 7–8	Italy; L 5–6	United States; W 8–5	Spain; D 9–9	4	Hungary; W 4–2^{P} FT: 9–9	Croatia; L 8–12	Italy; L 10–12	4

=== Men's tournament ===
The Montenegro men's water polo team qualified for the Olympics after securing a spot in the final and having attained an automatic berth by virtue of Serbia, as 2015 FINA World League champions, winning the other semifinal at the 2016 European Championships in Belgrade.

Team roster

The following is the Montenegrin roster in the men's water polo tournament of the 2016 Summer Olympics.

Head coach: Vladimir Gojković

№	Name	Pos.	Height	Weight	Date of birth	2016 club
1	Zdravko Radić	GK	1.93 m (6 ft 4 in)	96 kg (212 lb)	24 June 1979	(Italy) Lazio
2	Draško Brguljan	D	1.94 m (6 ft 4 in)	92 kg (203 lb)	27 December 1984	(Hungary) Orvosegyetem
3	Vjekoslav Pasković	D	1.80 m (5 ft 11 in)	86 kg (190 lb)	23 March 1985	(Turkey) Galatasaray
4	Antonio Petrović	CF	1.93 m (6 ft 4 in)	98 kg (216 lb)	24 September 1982	(Croatia) Primorje Rijeka
5	Darko Brguljan	CB	1.80 m (5 ft 11 in)	97 kg (214 lb)	5 November 1990	(Italy) Canottieri Napoli
6	Aleksandar Radović	D	1.91 m (6 ft 3 in)	98 kg (216 lb)	24 February 1987	(Germany) Waspo Hannover
7	Mlađan Janović	D	1.80 m (5 ft 11 in)	97 kg (214 lb)	11 June 1984	(Turkey) Galatasaray
8	Uroš Čučković	D	1.99 m (6 ft 6 in)	101 kg (223 lb)	25 April 1990	(Hungary) Eger
9	Aleksandar Ivović	CB	1.97 m (6 ft 6 in)	107 kg (236 lb)	24 February 1986	(Italy) Pro Recco
10	Saša Mišić	CF	1.98 m (6 ft 6 in)	109 kg (240 lb)	27 March 1987	(Russia) Kinef Kirishi
11	Filip Klikovac	CF	1.90 m (6 ft 3 in)	118 kg (260 lb)	7 February 1989	(Italy) Posillipo
12	Predrag Jokić (c)	CB	1.88 m (6 ft 2 in)	102 kg (225 lb)	3 February 1983	(Germany) Waspo Hannover
13	Miloš Šćepanović	GK	1.85 m (6 ft 1 in)	86 kg (190 lb)	9 October 1982	(Turkey) Galatasaray

Group play

Pos	Team	Pld	W	D	L	GF	GA	GD	Pts	Qualification
1	Spain	5	3	1	1	46	35	+11	7	Quarter-finals
2	Croatia	5	3	0	2	37	37	0	6	Quarter-finals
3	Italy	5	3	0	2	40	41	−1	6	Quarter-finals
4	Montenegro	5	2	1	2	36	32	+4	5	Quarter-finals
5	United States	5	2	0	3	35	35	0	4	
6	France	5	1	0	4	28	42	−14	2	

Source: Rio2016
Rules for classification: 1) Points; 2) Head-to-head points; 3) Head-to-head goal difference; 4) Head-to-head goals scored; 5) Goal difference.

6 August 2016; 19:30	Report	France	4–7	Montenegro	Maria Lenk Aquatic Center, Rio de Janeiro; Referees: Mark Koganov (AZE), Péter Molnár (HUN)
6 August 2016; 19:30	Report	Score by quarters: 0–2, 0–3, 1–0, 3–2			Maria Lenk Aquatic Center, Rio de Janeiro; Referees: Mark Koganov (AZE), Péter Molnár (HUN)
6 August 2016; 19:30	Report	four players 1	Goals	Radović 3	Maria Lenk Aquatic Center, Rio de Janeiro; Referees: Mark Koganov (AZE), Péter Molnár (HUN)

8 August 2016; 20:50	Report	Croatia	8–7	Montenegro	Maria Lenk Aquatic Center, Rio de Janeiro; Referees: Georgios Stavridis (GRE), Daniel Flahive (AUS)
8 August 2016; 20:50	Report	Score by quarters: 2–2, 2–1, 1–2, 3–2			Maria Lenk Aquatic Center, Rio de Janeiro; Referees: Georgios Stavridis (GRE), Daniel Flahive (AUS)
8 August 2016; 20:50	Report	three players 2	Goals	Brguljan, Janović 2	Maria Lenk Aquatic Center, Rio de Janeiro; Referees: Georgios Stavridis (GRE), Daniel Flahive (AUS)

10 August 2016; 13:00	Report	Montenegro	5–6	Italy	Maria Lenk Aquatic Center, Rio de Janeiro; Referees: Péter Molnár (HUN), Georgios Stavridis (GRE)
10 August 2016; 13:00	Report	Score by quarters: 1–2, 1–1, 0–1, 3–2			Maria Lenk Aquatic Center, Rio de Janeiro; Referees: Péter Molnár (HUN), Georgios Stavridis (GRE)
10 August 2016; 13:00	Report	Brguljan 2	Goals	Di Fulvio 3	Maria Lenk Aquatic Center, Rio de Janeiro; Referees: Péter Molnár (HUN), Georgios Stavridis (GRE)

12 August 2016; 11:40	Report	United States	5–8	Montenegro	Maria Lenk Aquatic Center, Rio de Janeiro; Referees: Radosław Koryzna (POL), Georgios Stavridis (GRE)
12 August 2016; 11:40	Report	Score by quarters: 1–2, 0–0, 2–2, 2–4			Maria Lenk Aquatic Center, Rio de Janeiro; Referees: Radosław Koryzna (POL), Georgios Stavridis (GRE)
12 August 2016; 11:40	Report	Samuels 2	Goals	Da. Brguljan 2	Maria Lenk Aquatic Center, Rio de Janeiro; Referees: Radosław Koryzna (POL), Georgios Stavridis (GRE)

14 August 2016; 12:50	Report	Montenegro	9–9	Spain	Olympic Aquatics Stadium, Rio de Janeiro; Referees: Sergey Naumov (RUS), Radosław Koryzna (POL)
14 August 2016; 12:50	Report	Score by quarters: 2–2, 3–2, 2–4, 2–1			Olympic Aquatics Stadium, Rio de Janeiro; Referees: Sergey Naumov (RUS), Radosław Koryzna (POL)
14 August 2016; 12:50	Report	three players 2	Goals	Molina 2	Olympic Aquatics Stadium, Rio de Janeiro; Referees: Sergey Naumov (RUS), Radosław Koryzna (POL)

Quarterfinal

16 August 2016; 11:00	Report	Hungary	9–9; PSO: 2–4	Montenegro	Olympic Aquatics Stadium, Rio de Janeiro; Referees: Mark Koganov (AZE), Joseph Peila (USA)
16 August 2016; 11:00	Report	Score by quarters: 1–2, 2–3, 3–3, 3–1			Olympic Aquatics Stadium, Rio de Janeiro; Referees: Mark Koganov (AZE), Joseph Peila (USA)
16 August 2016; 11:00	Report	Erdélyi, Vámos 3	Goals	Ivović 3	Olympic Aquatics Stadium, Rio de Janeiro; Referees: Mark Koganov (AZE), Joseph Peila (USA)

Semifinal

18 August 2016; 12:20	Report	Montenegro	8–12	Croatia	Olympic Aquatics Stadium, Rio de Janeiro; Referees: Adrian Alexandrescu (ROU), Joseph Peila (USA)
18 August 2016; 12:20	Report	Score by quarters: 3–4, 2–3, 1–1, 2–4			Olympic Aquatics Stadium, Rio de Janeiro; Referees: Adrian Alexandrescu (ROU), Joseph Peila (USA)
18 August 2016; 12:20	Report	Brguljan, Ivović 3	Goals	Bušlje 4	Olympic Aquatics Stadium, Rio de Janeiro; Referees: Adrian Alexandrescu (ROU), Joseph Peila (USA)

Bronze medal match

20 August 2016; 13:00	Report	Montenegro	10–12	Italy	Olympic Aquatics Stadium, Rio de Janeiro; Referees: Boris Margeta (SLO), Sergey Naumov (RUS)
20 August 2016; 13:00	Report	Score by quarters: 1–2, 3–3, 2–4, 4–3			Olympic Aquatics Stadium, Rio de Janeiro; Referees: Boris Margeta (SLO), Sergey Naumov (RUS)
20 August 2016; 13:00	Report	Janović 3	Goals	C. Presciutti 4	Olympic Aquatics Stadium, Rio de Janeiro; Referees: Boris Margeta (SLO), Sergey Naumov (RUS)
