= Montenegro at the 2011 World Aquatics Championships =

- Flag of Montenegro
- World Aquatics code: MNE
- National federation: Vaterpolo i plivački savez Crne Gore
- Website: www.wpolomne.org

in Shanghai, China
- Competitors: 13 in 1 sport
- Medals: Gold 0 Silver 0 Bronze 0 Total 0

World Aquatics Championships appearances (overview)
- 2007; 2009; 2011; 2013; 2015; 2017; 2019; 2022; 2023; 2024; 2025

Other related appearances
- Yugoslavia (1973–1991); Serbia and Montenegro (1998–2005)

Montenegro competed at the 2011 World Aquatics Championships in Shanghai, China.

== Water polo ==
=== Men ===
Team Roster

- Denis Šefik
- Draško Brguljan
- Aleksandar Radović
- Damjan Danilović
- Nikola Vukčević
- Milan Tičić
- Filip Klikovać
- Nikola Janović - Captain
- Aleksandar Ivović
- Darko Brguljan
- Antonio Petrović
- Predrag Jokić
- Miloš Šćepanović

==== Group A ====
Team	Played	W	D	L	GF	GA	GD	Pts
Hungary	3	3	0	0	39	26	+13	6
Montenegro	3	2	0	1	35	23	+12	4
Spain	3	1	0	2	36	26	+10	2
Kazakhstan	3	0	0	3	15	50	–35	0

July 18, 2011; 09:30	Report	Hungary	11–10	Montenegro	Shanghai Oriental Sports Center, Shanghai; Attendance: 600; Referees: Naumov (RUS), Tulga (TUR)
July 18, 2011; 09:30	Report	Score by quarters: 2–3, 3–2, 2–4, 4–1			Shanghai Oriental Sports Center, Shanghai; Attendance: 600; Referees: Naumov (RUS), Tulga (TUR)
July 18, 2011; 09:30	Report	Biros 4	Goals	Janović, Ivović 2	Shanghai Oriental Sports Center, Shanghai; Attendance: 600; Referees: Naumov (RUS), Tulga (TUR)

July 20, 2011; 18:20	Report	Spain	7–9	Montenegro	Shanghai Oriental Sports Center, Shanghai; Attendance: 650; Referees: Caputi (ITA), Bock (GER)
July 20, 2011; 18:20	Report	Score by quarters: 1–3, 1–2, 2–1, 3–3			Shanghai Oriental Sports Center, Shanghai; Attendance: 650; Referees: Caputi (ITA), Bock (GER)
July 20, 2011; 18:20	Report	Alferez, Vallès 2	Goals	Janović, Brguljan 2	Shanghai Oriental Sports Center, Shanghai; Attendance: 650; Referees: Caputi (ITA), Bock (GER)

July 22, 2011; 18:20	Report	Kazakhstan	5–16	Montenegro	Shanghai Oriental Sports Center, Shanghai; Attendance: 450; Referees: Koryzna (POL), Gonzalez (PUR)
July 22, 2011; 18:20	Report	Score by quarters: 2–5, 0–5, 0–2, 3–4			Shanghai Oriental Sports Center, Shanghai; Attendance: 450; Referees: Koryzna (POL), Gonzalez (PUR)
July 22, 2011; 18:20	Report	Zhilyayev 3	Goals	Radović 4	Shanghai Oriental Sports Center, Shanghai; Attendance: 450; Referees: Koryzna (POL), Gonzalez (PUR)

==== Playoff round ====
July 24, 2011; 12:10	Report	Montenegro	8–4	Romania	Shanghai Oriental Sports Center, Shanghai; Attendance: 600; Referees: Tulga (TUR), Koganov (AZE)
July 24, 2011; 12:10	Report	Score by quarters: 2–1, 1–2, 3–0, 2–1			Shanghai Oriental Sports Center, Shanghai; Attendance: 600; Referees: Tulga (TUR), Koganov (AZE)
July 24, 2011; 12:10	Report	Brguljan, Jokić 2	Goals	Radu 2	Shanghai Oriental Sports Center, Shanghai; Attendance: 600; Referees: Tulga (TUR), Koganov (AZE)

==== Quarterfinals ====
July 26, 2011; 16:40	Report	Croatia	9–6	Montenegro	Shanghai Oriental Sports Center, Shanghai; Attendance: 350; Referees: Tulga (TUR), Stavridis (GRE)
July 26, 2011; 16:40	Report	Score by quarters: 2–2, 2–1, 4–0, 1–3			Shanghai Oriental Sports Center, Shanghai; Attendance: 350; Referees: Tulga (TUR), Stavridis (GRE)
July 26, 2011; 16:40	Report	Joković 4	Goals	Radović 2	Shanghai Oriental Sports Center, Shanghai; Attendance: 350; Referees: Tulga (TUR), Stavridis (GRE)

==== Classification 5–8 ====
July 28, 2011; 15:30	Report	Montenegro	9–10	Spain	Shanghai Oriental Sports Center, Shanghai; Attendance: 1,100; Referees: Alexandrescu (ROU), Naumov (RUS)
July 28, 2011; 15:30	Report	Score by quarters: 2–2, 3–5, 2–1, 2–2			Shanghai Oriental Sports Center, Shanghai; Attendance: 1,100; Referees: Alexandrescu (ROU), Naumov (RUS)
July 28, 2011; 15:30	Report	Radović 3	Goals	Trias 3	Shanghai Oriental Sports Center, Shanghai; Attendance: 1,100; Referees: Alexandrescu (ROU), Naumov (RUS)

==== Seventh place game ====
July 30, 2011; 09:30	Report	Germany	5–8	Montenegro	Shanghai Oriental Sports Center, Shanghai; Attendance: 350; Referees: Alexnadrescu (ROU), Ni (CHN)
July 30, 2011; 09:30	Report	Score by quarters: 3–4, 1–3, 1–1, 0–0			Shanghai Oriental Sports Center, Shanghai; Attendance: 350; Referees: Alexnadrescu (ROU), Ni (CHN)
July 30, 2011; 09:30	Report	Real, Schüler 2	Goals	Radović, Brguljan 2	Shanghai Oriental Sports Center, Shanghai; Attendance: 350; Referees: Alexnadrescu (ROU), Ni (CHN)
