= Montenegro at the 2015 World Aquatics Championships =

- Flag of Montenegro
- World Aquatics code: MNE
- National federation: Vaterpolo i plivački savez Crne Gore
- Website: www.wpolomne.org

in Kazan, Russia
- Competitors: 16 in 2 sports
- Medals: Gold 0 Silver 0 Bronze 0 Total 0

World Aquatics Championships appearances (overview)
- 2007; 2009; 2011; 2013; 2015; 2017; 2019; 2022; 2023; 2024; 2025

Other related appearances
- Yugoslavia (1973–1991); Serbia and Montenegro (1998–2005)

Montenegro competed at the 2015 World Aquatics Championships in Kazan, Russia from 24 July to 9 August 2015.

== Swimming ==
Montenegrin swimmers have achieved qualifying standards in the following events (up to a maximum of 2 swimmers in each event at the A-standard entry time, and 1 at the B-standard):

Men

Athlete	Event	Heat		Semifinal		Final	
Athlete	Event	Time	Rank	Time	Rank	Time	Rank
Maksim Inić	50 m freestyle	23.54	50	did not advance			
Maksim Inić	50 m butterfly	25.52	49	did not advance			
Boško Radulović	100 m freestyle	54.53	89	did not advance			
Boško Radulović	100 m butterfly	58.10	62	did not advance			

Women

Athlete	Event	Heat		Semifinal		Final	
Athlete	Event	Time	Rank	Time	Rank	Time	Rank
Jovana Terzić	50 m freestyle	27.44	62	did not advance			
Jovana Terzić	100 m freestyle	59.78	68	did not advance			

== Water polo ==
=== Men's tournament ===
Team roster

- Dejan Lazović
- Draško Brguljan
- Vjekoslav Pasković
- Uroš Čučković
- Darko Brguljan
- Aleksandar Radović
- Mlađan Janović
- Aleksa Ukropina
- Aleksandar Ivović
- Nikola Murišić
- Filip Klikovac
- Predrag Jokić
- Miloš Šćepanović

Group play

Pos	Team	Pld	W	D	L	GF	GA	GD	Pts	Qualification
1	Serbia	3	3	0	0	40	26	+14	6	Advanced to quarterfinals
2	Australia	3	1	1	1	24	19	+5	3	Advanced to playoffs
3	Montenegro	3	1	1	1	29	26	+3	3	Advanced to playoffs
4	Japan	3	0	0	3	23	45	−22	0	

Source: SportResult.com
Rules for classification: 1) points; 2) head-to-head points; 3) head-to-head goal difference; 4) head-to-head number of goals scored; 5) goal difference.

27 July 2015; 20:10	Report	Serbia	11–8	Montenegro	Kazan; Attendance: 2,279; Referees: Georgios Stavridis (GRE), Adrian Alexandrescu (ROU)
27 July 2015; 20:10	Report	Score by quarters: 2–1, 4–2, 3–4, 2–1			Kazan; Attendance: 2,279; Referees: Georgios Stavridis (GRE), Adrian Alexandrescu (ROU)
27 July 2015; 20:10	Report	Filipović 3	Goals	three players 2	Kazan; Attendance: 2,279; Referees: Georgios Stavridis (GRE), Adrian Alexandrescu (ROU)

29 July 2015; 13:30	Report	Australia	5–5	Montenegro	Kazan; Attendance: 313; Referees: Boris Margeta (SLO), Sergey Naumov (RUS)
29 July 2015; 13:30	Report	Score by quarters: 0–2, 1–1, 1–1, 3–1			Kazan; Attendance: 313; Referees: Boris Margeta (SLO), Sergey Naumov (RUS)
29 July 2015; 13:30	Report	Younger 3	Goals	Janović 2	Kazan; Attendance: 313; Referees: Boris Margeta (SLO), Sergey Naumov (RUS)

31 July 2015; 13:30	Report	Japan	10–16	Montenegro	Kazan; Attendance: 640; Referees: Dion Willis (RSA), Massimiliano Caputi (ITA)
31 July 2015; 13:30	Report	Score by quarters: 2–3, 2–5, 2–5, 4–3			Kazan; Attendance: 640; Referees: Dion Willis (RSA), Massimiliano Caputi (ITA)
31 July 2015; 13:30	Report	Takei 4	Goals	Ivović, Radović 4	Kazan; Attendance: 640; Referees: Dion Willis (RSA), Massimiliano Caputi (ITA)

Playoffs

2 August 2015; 18:50	Report	Kazakhstan	8–12	Montenegro	Kazan; Attendance: 2,896; Referees: Joseph Peila (USA), Daniel Flahive (AUS)
2 August 2015; 18:50	Report	Score by quarters: 3–2, 2–3, 1–5, 2–2			Kazan; Attendance: 2,896; Referees: Joseph Peila (USA), Daniel Flahive (AUS)
2 August 2015; 18:50	Report	Gubarev 3	Goals	Brguljan, Janović 3	Kazan; Attendance: 2,896; Referees: Joseph Peila (USA), Daniel Flahive (AUS)

Quarterfinals

4 August 2015; 17:30	Report	Croatia	10–4	Montenegro	Kazan; Attendance: 1,769; Referees: Radosław Koryzna (POL), Massimiliano Caputi (ITA)
4 August 2015; 17:30	Report	Score by quarters: 1–0, 3–0, 3–3, 3–1			Kazan; Attendance: 1,769; Referees: Radosław Koryzna (POL), Massimiliano Caputi (ITA)
4 August 2015; 17:30	Report	Muslim 3	Goals	Klikovac 3	Kazan; Attendance: 1,769; Referees: Radosław Koryzna (POL), Massimiliano Caputi (ITA)

5th–8th place semifinals

6 August 2015; 15:30	Report	Montenegro	11–8	Australia	Kazan; Attendance: 1,500; Referees: Francesc Buch (ESP), Vojin Putniković (SRB)
6 August 2015; 15:30	Report	Score by quarters: 4–1, 1–1, 4–4, 2–2			Kazan; Attendance: 1,500; Referees: Francesc Buch (ESP), Vojin Putniković (SRB)
6 August 2015; 15:30	Report	Janović 4	Goals	three players 2	Kazan; Attendance: 1,500; Referees: Francesc Buch (ESP), Vojin Putniković (SRB)

Fifth place game

8 August 2015; 15:30	Report	Montenegro	10–9	Hungary	Kazan; Attendance: 2,365; Referees: Mark Koganov (AZE), Joseph Peila (USA)
8 August 2015; 15:30	Report	Score by quarters: 2–2, 2–1, 2–2, 4–4			Kazan; Attendance: 2,365; Referees: Mark Koganov (AZE), Joseph Peila (USA)
8 August 2015; 15:30	Report	Ivović 3	Goals	three players 2	Kazan; Attendance: 2,365; Referees: Mark Koganov (AZE), Joseph Peila (USA)
