= Montenegro at the 2008 Summer Olympics =

- IOC code: MNE
- NOC: Montenegrin Olympic Committee
- Website: www.cok.me(in Montenegrin)

in Beijing
- Competitors: 19 in 6 sports
- Flag bearer: Veljko Uskoković
- Medals: Gold 0 Silver 0 Bronze 0 Total 0

Summer Olympics appearances (overview)
- 2008; 2012; 2016; 2020; 2024

Other related appearances
- Yugoslavia (1920–1992W); Independent Olympic Participants (1992S); Serbia and Montenegro (1996–2006)

Montenegro competed as an independent nation for the first time at the Olympic Games at the 2008 Summer Olympics in Beijing, People's Republic of China. Montenegro was the youngest nation to participate in the 2008 Summer Olympics. Athletes from Montenegro participated in three different events. In individual events, the new nation had representatives in boxing and shooting. Boxer Milorad Gajović represented his country in the heavyweight division, while Nikola Šaranović competed in 10 m air pistol and 50 m pistol precision shooting events. In team competition, Montenegro competed in water polo. The Montenegro national water polo team won the 2007 European Water Polo Olympic Qualification Tournament to qualify for the Olympic games.

Montenegro failed to win any medals, but did advance to the bronze medal match in men's water polo, where they lost to Serbia, 6–4.

== History ==
Montenegro created its National Olympic Committee in 2006, and gained International Olympic Committee recognition in 2007 during the IOC's meetings in Guatemala City. Previously, Montenegrin athletes competed as part of the Serbia and Montenegro team in 2004, and as part of Yugoslavia teams before that. Montenegro was also part of the Yugoslavian team in the 1992 Summer Olympics that participated as the Independent Olympic Participants. Following Montenegro's referendum to become a free nation, Serbia was declared the successor state and inherited the joint nation's National Olympic Committee. The admittance of Montenegro, along with Tuvalu and the Marshall Islands, brought the total number of nations that competed in the 2008 Olympics to 204.

== Athletics ==
Key

- Note–Ranks given for track events are within the athlete's heat only
- Q = Qualified for the next round
- q = Qualified for the next round as a fastest loser or, in field events, by position without achieving the qualifying target
- NR = National record
- N/A = Round not applicable for the event
- Bye = Athlete not required to compete in round

Men

Athlete	Event	Final	
Athlete	Event	Result	Rank
Goran Stojiljković	Marathon	2:28:14	62

Women

Athlete	Event	Heat		Quarterfinal		Semifinal		Final	
Athlete	Event	Result	Rank	Result	Rank	Result	Rank	Result	Rank
Milena Milašević	100 m	12.65	8	Did not advance					

== Boxing ==
Milorad Gajović qualified in the heavyweight class at the second European continental qualifying tournament.

Athlete	Event	Round of 32	Round of 16	Quarterfinals	Semifinals	Final	
Athlete	Event	Opposition Result	Opposition Result	Opposition Result	Opposition Result	Opposition Result	Rank
Milorad Gajović	Heavyweight	Pavlidis (GRE); L 3–7	Did not advance				

== Judo ==
Athlete	Event	Preliminary	Round of 32	Round of 16	Quarterfinals	Semifinals	Repechage 1	Repechage 2	Repechage 3	Final / BM	
Athlete	Event	Opposition Result	Opposition Result	Opposition Result	Opposition Result	Opposition Result	Opposition Result	Opposition Result	Opposition Result	Opposition Result	Rank
Srđan Mrvaljević	Men's −81 kg	Badra (TUN); W 0020–0010	Nchama (GEQ); W 1011–0000	Guo L (CHN); W 0111–0001	Elmont (NED); L 0000–0010	Did not advance	Bye	Nyamkhüü (MGL); L 0000–1002	Did not advance		

== Shooting ==
Nikola Šaranović participated in the 2008 Summer Olympics in Beijing, China, at the age of 39. He ranked 40 in the Men's Air pistol 10 metres event. Šaranović also competed in the Men's Free Pistol 50 metres event, and ranked 44 overall. He did not earn any medals in the 2008 Summer Olympics, but went on to participate in both events again in the 2012 Summer Olympics in London.

Men

Athlete	Event	Qualification		Final	
Athlete	Event	Points	Rank	Points	Rank
Nikola Šaranović	10 m air pistol	570	41	Did not advance	
Nikola Šaranović	50 m pistol	535	45	Did not advance	

== Swimming ==
Marina Kuč represented Montenegro in the 2008 Summer Olympics in Beijing, China. She ranked 31st in the preliminaries for the Women's 200m Breaststroke event with a finishing time of 2:31.24.

Women

Athlete	Event	Heat		Semifinal		Final	
Athlete	Event	Time	Rank	Time	Rank	Time	Rank
Marina Kuč	200 m breaststroke	2:31.24	31	Did not advance			

== Water polo ==
=== Men's tournament ===
The national team qualified as one of the twelve teams in the men's tournament by winning the European qualifying tournament in September 2007. The team finished in fourth place.

Roster

The following is the Montenegrin roster in the men's water polo tournament of the 2008 Summer Olympics.

№	Name	Pos.	Height	Weight	Date of birth	Club
1	Zdravko Radić	GK	1.93 m (6 ft 4 in)	95 kg (209 lb)	24 June 1979	(Montenegro) VK Primorac Kotor
2	Draško Brguljan	D	1.94 m (6 ft 4 in)	85 kg (187 lb)	27 December 1984	(Montenegro) VK Primorac Kotor
3	Vjekoslav Pasković	D	1.80 m (5 ft 11 in)	83 kg (183 lb)	23 March 1985	(Montenegro) VK Primorac Kotor
4	Nikola Vukčević	CF	1.99 m (6 ft 6 in)	107 kg (236 lb)	14 November 1985	(Montenegro) PVK Jadran
5	Nikola Janović	D	1.90 m (6 ft 3 in)	100 kg (220 lb)	22 March 1980	(Italy) Posillipo Naples
6	Milan Tičić	CB	1.97 m (6 ft 6 in)	95 kg (209 lb)	14 August 1979	(Montenegro) PVK Budvanska rivijera
7	Mlađan Janović	D	1.90 m (6 ft 3 in)	93 kg (205 lb)	11 June 1984	(Montenegro) VK Primorac Kotor
8	Veljko Uskoković	D	1.85 m (6 ft 1 in)	100 kg (220 lb)	29 March 1971	(Montenegro) PVK Budvanska rivijera
9	Aleksandar Ivović	CB	1.97 m (6 ft 6 in)	103 kg (227 lb)	24 February 1986	(Montenegro) PVK Jadran
10	Boris Zloković	CF	2.00 m (6 ft 7 in)	99 kg (218 lb)	16 March 1983	(Italy) Posillipo Naples
11	Vladimir Gojković	D	1.88 m (6 ft 2 in)	92 kg (203 lb)	29 January 1981	(Montenegro) PVK Jadran
12	Predrag Jokić	CB	1.95 m (6 ft 5 in)	92 kg (203 lb)	3 February 1983	(Italy) Pro Recco
13	Miloš Šćepanović	GK	1.85 m (6 ft 1 in)	88 kg (194 lb)	9 October 1982	(Montenegro) PVK Jadran

Head coach: Petar Porobić

Group play

Team	Pld	W	D	L	GF	GA	GD	Pts	Qualification
Hungary	5	4	1	0	60	36	+24	9	Qualified for the semifinals
Spain	5	4	0	1	52	34	+18	8	Qualified for the quarterfinals
Montenegro	5	2	2	1	43	33	+10	6	Qualified for the quarterfinals
Australia	5	2	1	2	45	40	+5	5	Will play for places 7–10
Greece	5	1	0	4	39	56	−17	2	Will play for places 7–12
Canada	5	0	0	5	21	61	−40	0	Will play for places 7–12

All times are China Standard Time (UTC+8).

10 August 2008; 10:50	Report	Hungary	10–10	Montenegro	Ying Tung Natatorium, Beijing; Referees: Margeta (SLO), Caputi (ITA)
10 August 2008; 10:50	Report	Score by quarters: 3–3, 3–1, 2–4, 2–2			Ying Tung Natatorium, Beijing; Referees: Margeta (SLO), Caputi (ITA)
10 August 2008; 10:50	Report	Dé. Varga 2, Kásás 2, Benedek 2	Goals	M. Janović 4, Ivović 2, Gojković 2	Ying Tung Natatorium, Beijing; Referees: Margeta (SLO), Caputi (ITA)

12 August 2008; 9:30	Report	Canada	0–12	Montenegro	Ying Tung Natatorium, Beijing; Referees: Knights (NZL), Pinker (RSA)
12 August 2008; 9:30	Report	Score by quarters: 0–3, 0–4, 0–4, 0–1			Ying Tung Natatorium, Beijing; Referees: Knights (NZL), Pinker (RSA)
12 August 2008; 9:30	Report	-	Goals	Vukčević 2, M. Janović 2, Gojković 2	Ying Tung Natatorium, Beijing; Referees: Knights (NZL), Pinker (RSA)

14 August 2008; 14:00	Report	Montenegro	10–6	Greece	Ying Tung Natatorium, Beijing; Referees: Tulga (TUR), Margeta (SLO)
14 August 2008; 14:00	Report	Score by quarters: 3–1, 2–1, 5–2, 0–2			Ying Tung Natatorium, Beijing; Referees: Tulga (TUR), Margeta (SLO)
14 August 2008; 14:00	Report	M. Janović 2, Zloković 2, Gojković 2, Jokić 2	Goals	Ntoskas 2	Ying Tung Natatorium, Beijing; Referees: Tulga (TUR), Margeta (SLO)

16 August 2008; 14:00	Report	Spain	12–6	Montenegro	Ying Tung Natatorium, Beijing; Referees: Chaney (USA), Tulga (TUR)
16 August 2008; 14:00	Report	Score by quarters: 3–0, 4–1, 3–4, 2–1			Ying Tung Natatorium, Beijing; Referees: Chaney (USA), Tulga (TUR)
16 August 2008; 14:00	Report	Molina 3, F. Perrone 2, X. García 2	Goals	N. Janović 2, Ivović 2	Ying Tung Natatorium, Beijing; Referees: Chaney (USA), Tulga (TUR)

18 August 2008; 12:10	Report	Montenegro	5–5	Australia	Ying Tung Natatorium, Beijing; Referees: Chaney (USA), Caputi (ITA)
18 August 2008; 12:10	Report	Score by quarters: 2–1, 1–2, 0–1, 2–1			Ying Tung Natatorium, Beijing; Referees: Chaney (USA), Caputi (ITA)
18 August 2008; 12:10	Report	Vukčević 1, M. Janović 1, Ivović 1, Zloković 1, Gojković 1	Goals	Campbell 1, Martin 1, McGregor 1, Woods 1, Beadsworth 1	Ying Tung Natatorium, Beijing; Referees: Chaney (USA), Caputi (ITA)

Quarterfinal

20 August 2008; 16:00	Report	Montenegro	7–6	Croatia	Ying Tung Natatorium, Beijing; Referees: Tulga (TUR), Bock (GER)
20 August 2008; 16:00	Report	Score by quarters: 3–1, 2–3, 1–0, 1–2			Ying Tung Natatorium, Beijing; Referees: Tulga (TUR), Bock (GER)
20 August 2008; 16:00	Report	N. Janović 2, Ivović 2, Gojković 2	Goals	Hinić 2	Ying Tung Natatorium, Beijing; Referees: Tulga (TUR), Bock (GER)

Semifinal

22 August 2008; 18:20	Report	Hungary	11–9	Montenegro	Ying Tung Natatorium, Beijing; Referees: Simion (ROU), Tulga (TUR)
22 August 2008; 18:20	Report	Score by quarters: 3–4, 3–3, 3–0, 2–2			Ying Tung Natatorium, Beijing; Referees: Simion (ROU), Tulga (TUR)
22 August 2008; 18:20	Report	Kiss 3, Madaras 2	Goals	N. Janović 2, Uskoković 2, Gojković 2	Ying Tung Natatorium, Beijing; Referees: Simion (ROU), Tulga (TUR)

Bronze medal game

24 August 2008; 14:20	Report	Montenegro	4–6	Serbia (bronze)	Ying Tung Natatorium, Beijing; Referees: Tulga (TUR), Margeta (SLO)
24 August 2008; 14:20	Report	Score by quarters: 0–2, 1–2, 1–2, 2–0			Ying Tung Natatorium, Beijing; Referees: Tulga (TUR), Margeta (SLO)
24 August 2008; 14:20	Report	M. Janović 2	Goals	Savić 2	Ying Tung Natatorium, Beijing; Referees: Tulga (TUR), Margeta (SLO)
