= Montenegro at the 2009 World Aquatics Championships =

- Flag of Montenegro
- World Aquatics code: MNE
- National federation: Vaterpolo i plivački savez Crne Gore
- Website: www.wpolomne.org

in Rome, Italy
- Competitors: 13 in 1 sport
- Medals: Gold 0 Silver 0 Bronze 0 Total 0

World Aquatics Championships appearances (overview)
- 2007; 2009; 2011; 2013; 2015; 2017; 2019; 2022; 2023; 2024; 2025

Other related appearances
- Yugoslavia (1973–1991); Serbia and Montenegro (1998–2005)

Montenegro competed at the 2009 World Aquatics Championships in Rome, Italy.

== Water polo ==
=== Group B ===
Team	Pld	W	D	L	GF	GA	GD	Pts
Croatia	3	3	0	0	37	12	+25	6
Montenegro	3	2	0	1	38	20	+18	4
China	3	1	0	2	18	34	-16	2
Brazil	3	0	0	3	12	39	-27	0

20 July 2009; 12:10	Match 3	Montenegro	14–4	China	Attendance: 250; Referees: Kiszelly (HUN), Moner (EGY)
20 July 2009; 12:10	Match 3	Score by quarters: 4-1, 3-2, 3-1, 4-0			Attendance: 250; Referees: Kiszelly (HUN), Moner (EGY)
20 July 2009; 12:10	Match 3	Zloković 4	Goals	Tan 2	Attendance: 250; Referees: Kiszelly (HUN), Moner (EGY)

22 July 2009; 10:50	Match 10	Montenegro	5–11	Croatia	Attendance: 200; Referees: Turcotte (CAN), Tulga (TUR)
22 July 2009; 10:50	Match 10	Score by quarters: 2-4, 2-2, 0-5, 1-0			Attendance: 200; Referees: Turcotte (CAN), Tulga (TUR)
22 July 2009; 10:50	Match 10	five players 1	Goals	Sukno 3	Attendance: 200; Referees: Turcotte (CAN), Tulga (TUR)

24 July 2009; 18:20	Match 22	Montenegro	19–5	Brazil	Attendance: 1,200; Referees: Rotsart (USA), Damcevski (MKD)
24 July 2009; 18:20	Match 22	Score by quarters: 4-1, 6-0, 6-3, 3-1			Attendance: 1,200; Referees: Rotsart (USA), Damcevski (MKD)
24 July 2009; 18:20	Match 22	M. Janovic, N. Janović 4	Goals	Franco 2	Attendance: 1,200; Referees: Rotsart (USA), Damcevski (MKD)

=== Eightfinals ===
26 July 2009; 15:30	Match 28	Germany	9–8 (OT)	Montenegro	Attendance: 1,200; Referees: Kiszelly (HUN), Gomez (ITA)
26 July 2009; 15:30	Match 28	Score by quarters: 3-3, 1-2, 2-2, 2-1 OT: 1-0			Attendance: 1,200; Referees: Kiszelly (HUN), Gomez (ITA)
26 July 2009; 15:30	Match 28	Savic 3	Goals	M. Janovic, Zloković 2	Attendance: 1,200; Referees: Kiszelly (HUN), Gomez (ITA)

=== Semifinals 9–12 places ===
28 July 2009; 11:20	Match 33	China	5–13	Montenegro	Attendance: 500; Referees: Ghafouri (IRI), Damcevski (MKD)
28 July 2009; 11:20	Match 33	Score by quarters: 1-2, 0-2, 1-5, 3-4			Attendance: 500; Referees: Ghafouri (IRI), Damcevski (MKD)
28 July 2009; 11:20	Match 33	Yu 4	Goals	Gojković 3	Attendance: 500; Referees: Ghafouri (IRI), Damcevski (MKD)

=== 9th place ===
30 July 2009; 10:20	Match 40	Montenegro	8–7	Australia	Attendance: 600; Referees: Balfanbayev (KAZ), Stravropoulos (GRE)
30 July 2009; 10:20	Match 40	Score by quarters: 1-3, 2-1, 1-2, 4-1			Attendance: 600; Referees: Balfanbayev (KAZ), Stravropoulos (GRE)
30 July 2009; 10:20	Match 40	Ivović 3	Goals	Campbell 2	Attendance: 600; Referees: Balfanbayev (KAZ), Stravropoulos (GRE)

Team Roster

- Zdravko Radić
- Draško Brguljan
- Vjekoslav Pasković
- Nikola Vukčević
- Aleksandar Radović
- Milan Tičić
- Mlađjan Janović
- Nikola Janoviá
- Aleksandar Ivović
- Boris Zloković
- Vladimir Gojković
- Predrag Jokić
- Miloš Šćepanović
