= Montenegro at the 2013 World Aquatics Championships =

- Flag of Montenegro
- World Aquatics code: MNE
- National federation: Vaterpolo i plivački savez Crne Gore
- Website: www.wpolomne.org

in Barcelona, Spain
- Competitors: 13 in 1 sports
- Medals Ranked 24th: Gold 0 Silver 1 Bronze 0 Total 1

World Aquatics Championships appearances (overview)
- 2007; 2009; 2011; 2013; 2015; 2017; 2019; 2022; 2023; 2024; 2025

Other related appearances
- Yugoslavia (1973–1991); Serbia and Montenegro (1998–2005)

Montenegro competed at the 2013 World Aquatics Championships in Barcelona, Spain between 19 July to 4 August 2013.

== Medalists ==
Medal	Name	Sport	Event	Date
Silver	Montenegro men's national water polo team: Zdravko Radić; Draško Brguljan; Vjekoslav Pasković; Antonio Petrović; Darko Brguljan; Ugo Crousillat; Mlađan Janović; Nikola Janović; Aleksandar Ivović; Sasa Misić; Filip Klikovać; Predrag Jokić; Miloš Šćepanović	Water polo	Men's tournament	3 August

== Water polo ==
=== Men's tournament ===
Team roster

- Zdravko Radić
- Draško Brguljan
- Vjekoslav Pasković
- Antonio Petrović
- Darko Brguljan
- Ugo Crousillat
- Mlađan Janović
- Nikola Janović
- Aleksandar Ivović
- Sasa Misić
- Filip Klikovać
- Predrag Jokić
- Miloš Šćepanović

Group play

	Pld	W	D	L	GF	GA	GD	Pts
Greece	3	3	0	0	38	15	+23	6
Montenegro	3	2	0	1	34	12	+22	4
Spain	3	1	0	2	30	18	+12	2
New Zealand	3	0	0	3	8	65	−57	0

22 July 2013; 09:30	Report	Montenegro	4–6	Greece	Piscines Bernat Picornell, Barcelona; Attendance: 300; Referees: Alexandrescu (ROU), Naumov (RUS)
22 July 2013; 09:30	Report	Score by quarters: 0–0, 0–3, 1–2, 3–1			Piscines Bernat Picornell, Barcelona; Attendance: 300; Referees: Alexandrescu (ROU), Naumov (RUS)
22 July 2013; 09:30	Report	Ivović 3	Goals	Mylonakis 3	Piscines Bernat Picornell, Barcelona; Attendance: 300; Referees: Alexandrescu (ROU), Naumov (RUS)

24 July 2013; 21:30	Report	Montenegro	7–5	Spain	Piscines Bernat Picornell, Barcelona; Attendance: 2,800; Referees: Vogel (HUN), Alexandrescu (ROU)
24 July 2013; 21:30	Report	Score by quarters: 2–3, 2–2, 2–0, 1–0			Piscines Bernat Picornell, Barcelona; Attendance: 2,800; Referees: Vogel (HUN), Alexandrescu (ROU)
24 July 2013; 21:30	Report	Janović 5	Goals	Español 2	Piscines Bernat Picornell, Barcelona; Attendance: 2,800; Referees: Vogel (HUN), Alexandrescu (ROU)

26 July 2013; 17:30	Report	Montenegro	23–1	New Zealand	Piscines Bernat Picornell, Barcelona; Attendance: 550; Referees: Cardenuto (BRA), Gaber (EGY)
26 July 2013; 17:30	Report	Score by quarters: 5–0, 8–1, 6–0, 4–0			Piscines Bernat Picornell, Barcelona; Attendance: 550; Referees: Cardenuto (BRA), Gaber (EGY)
26 July 2013; 17:30	Report	Ivović 6	Goals	Pye 1	Piscines Bernat Picornell, Barcelona; Attendance: 550; Referees: Cardenuto (BRA), Gaber (EGY)

Round of 16

28 July 2013; 10:50	Report	Montenegro	12–4	Canada	Piscines Bernat Picornell, Barcelona; Attendance: 800; Referees: Balfanbayev (KAZ), Vogel (HUN)
28 July 2013; 10:50	Report	Score by quarters: 2–1, 3–0, 3–3, 4–0			Piscines Bernat Picornell, Barcelona; Attendance: 800; Referees: Balfanbayev (KAZ), Vogel (HUN)
28 July 2013; 10:50	Report	Ivović 3	Goals	Kudaba 2	Piscines Bernat Picornell, Barcelona; Attendance: 800; Referees: Balfanbayev (KAZ), Vogel (HUN)

Quarterfinal

30 July 2013; 20:15	Report	Montenegro	9–8	Serbia	Piscines Bernat Picornell, Barcelona; Attendance: 4,500; Referees: Flahive (AUS), Margeta (SLO)
30 July 2013; 20:15	Report	Score by quarters: 2–3, 4–3, 1–2, 2–0			Piscines Bernat Picornell, Barcelona; Attendance: 4,500; Referees: Flahive (AUS), Margeta (SLO)
30 July 2013; 20:15	Report	Janović 3	Goals	Mitrović 2	Piscines Bernat Picornell, Barcelona; Attendance: 4,500; Referees: Flahive (AUS), Margeta (SLO)

Semifinal

1 August 2013; 21:45	Report	Montenegro	10–8	Italy	Piscines Bernat Picornell, Barcelona; Attendance: 2,500; Referees: Margeta (SLO), Koryzna (POL)
1 August 2013; 21:45	Report	Score by quarters: 3–1, 2–0, 4–3, 1–4			Piscines Bernat Picornell, Barcelona; Attendance: 2,500; Referees: Margeta (SLO), Koryzna (POL)
1 August 2013; 21:45	Report	Janović 3	Goals	Figlioli, Aicardi 3	Piscines Bernat Picornell, Barcelona; Attendance: 2,500; Referees: Margeta (SLO), Koryzna (POL)

Final

3 August 2013; 22:15	Report	Hungary	8–7	Montenegro	Piscines Bernat Picornell, Barcelona; Attendance: 4,500; Referees: Borrell (ESP), Margeta (SLO)
3 August 2013; 22:15	Report	Score by quarters: 2–0, 1–2, 3–3, 2–2			Piscines Bernat Picornell, Barcelona; Attendance: 4,500; Referees: Borrell (ESP), Margeta (SLO)
3 August 2013; 22:15	Report	Szivós, Hárai 2	Goals	Ivović 3	Piscines Bernat Picornell, Barcelona; Attendance: 4,500; Referees: Borrell (ESP), Margeta (SLO)
