= Montenegro at the 2017 World Aquatics Championships =

- Flag of Montenegro
- FINA code: MNE
- National federation: Vaterpolo i plivački savez Crne Gore
- Website: www.wpolomne.org

in Budapest, Hungary
- Competitors: 16 in 2 sports
- Medals: Gold 0 Silver 0 Bronze 0 Total 0

World Aquatics Championships appearances (overview)
- 2007; 2009; 2011; 2013; 2015; 2017; 2019; 2022; 2023; 2024

Other related appearances
- Yugoslavia (1973–1991); Serbia and Montenegro (1998–2005)

Montenegro competed at the 2017 World Aquatics Championships in Budapest, Hungary from 14 July to 30 July.

== Swimming ==
Montenegro has received a Universality invitation from FINA to send three swimmers (two men and one woman) to the World Championships.

| Athlete | Event | Heat | | Semifinal | | Final | |
| Athlete | Event | Time | Rank | Time | Rank | Time | Rank |
|---|---|---|---|---|---|---|---|
| Ado Gargović | Men's 100 m freestyle | 54.89 | 84 | did not advance | | | |
| Ado Gargović | Men's 200 m freestyle | 2:01.07 | =68 | did not advance | | | |
| Boško Radulović | Men's 50 m freestyle | 24.42 | 89 | did not advance | | | |
| Boško Radulović | Men's 50 m butterfly | 25.24 | 53 | did not advance | | | |
| Jovana Terzić | Women's 50 m freestyle | 27.51 | =52 | did not advance | | | |
| Jovana Terzić | Women's 100 m freestyle | 59.86 | 57 | did not advance | | | |

== Water polo ==
Montenegro qualified a men's team.

=== Men's tournament ===
Team roster

- Dejan Lazović
- Draško Brguljan
- Bojan Banicević
- Marko Petković
- Darko Brguljan
- Aleksandar Radović
- Dragan Drašković
- Aleksa Ukropina
- Đuro Radović
- Saša Mišić
- Uroš Čučković
- Nikola Murisić
- Miloš Šćepanović (C)

Group play

| Pos | Team | Pld | W | D | L | GF | GA | GD | Pts | Qualification |
|---|---|---|---|---|---|---|---|---|---|---|
| 1 | Montenegro | 3 | 2 | 1 | 0 | 35 | 18 | +17 | 5 | Quarterfinals |
| 2 | Brazil | 3 | 1 | 1 | 1 | 17 | 22 | −5 | 3 | Playoffs |
| 3 | Kazakhstan | 3 | 1 | 0 | 2 | 17 | 28 | −11 | 2 (Note: Kazakhstan 10–9 Canada) | Playoffs |
| 4 | Canada | 3 | 0 | 2 | 1 | 23 | 24 | −1 | 2 | |

Source: Sportresult
Rules for classification: 1) points; 2) head-to-head points; 3) head-to-head goal difference; 4) head-to-head number of goals scored; 5) better result against higher placed team.
Notes:

| 17 July 2017; 17:05 | Report | Montenegro | 8–8 | Canada | Alfréd Hajós National Swimming Stadium, Budapest; Referees: Georgios Stavridis (GRE), Francesc Buch (ESP) |
| 17 July 2017; 17:05 | Report | Score by quarters: 3–1, 2–2, 1–1, 2–4 | | | Alfréd Hajós National Swimming Stadium, Budapest; Referees: Georgios Stavridis (GRE), Francesc Buch (ESP) |
| 17 July 2017; 17:05 | Report | Petković 3 | Goals | three players 2 | Alfréd Hajós National Swimming Stadium, Budapest; Referees: Georgios Stavridis (GRE), Francesc Buch (ESP) |

| 19 July 2017; 21:30 | Report | Brazil | 5–14 | Montenegro | Alfréd Hajós National Swimming Stadium, Budapest; Referees: Dion Willis (RSA), Yosuke Kajiwara (JPN) |
| 19 July 2017; 21:30 | Report | Score by quarters: 0–4, 2–3, 2–4, 1–3 | | | Alfréd Hajós National Swimming Stadium, Budapest; Referees: Dion Willis (RSA), Yosuke Kajiwara (JPN) |
| 19 July 2017; 21:30 | Report | G. Guimarães 2 | Goals | A. Radović 3 | Alfréd Hajós National Swimming Stadium, Budapest; Referees: Dion Willis (RSA), Yosuke Kajiwara (JPN) |

| 21 July 2017; 18:05 | Report | Montenegro | 13–5 | Kazakhstan | Alfréd Hajós National Swimming Stadium, Budapest; Referees: Georgios Stavridis (GRE), Steven Rotstart (USA) |
| 21 July 2017; 18:05 | Report | Score by quarters: 2–0, 4–0, 3–2, 4–3 | | | Alfréd Hajós National Swimming Stadium, Budapest; Referees: Georgios Stavridis (GRE), Steven Rotstart (USA) |
| 21 July 2017; 18:05 | Report | Čučković 4 | Goals | Ukumanov 2 | Alfréd Hajós National Swimming Stadium, Budapest; Referees: Georgios Stavridis (GRE), Steven Rotstart (USA) |

Quarterfinals

| 25 July 2017; 14:50 | Report | Montenegro | 7–12 | Greece | Alfréd Hajós National Swimming Stadium, Budapest; Referees: Adrian Alexandrescu (ROU), Daniel Flahive (AUS) |
| 25 July 2017; 14:50 | Report | Score by quarters: 0–1, 2–5, 1–4, 4–2 | | | Alfréd Hajós National Swimming Stadium, Budapest; Referees: Adrian Alexandrescu (ROU), Daniel Flahive (AUS) |
| 25 July 2017; 14:50 | Report | A. Radović 2 | Goals | Fountoulis 4 | Alfréd Hajós National Swimming Stadium, Budapest; Referees: Adrian Alexandrescu (ROU), Daniel Flahive (AUS) |

5th–8th place semifinals

| 27 July 2017; 13:30 | Report | Montenegro | 9–8 | Russia | Alfréd Hajós National Swimming Stadium, Budapest; Referees: Georgios Stavridis (GRE), Radosław Koryzna (POL) |
| 27 July 2017; 13:30 | Report | Score by quarters: 1–1, 4–2, 2–4, 2–1 | | | Alfréd Hajós National Swimming Stadium, Budapest; Referees: Georgios Stavridis (GRE), Radosław Koryzna (POL) |
| 27 July 2017; 13:30 | Report | Dr. Brguljan 4 | Goals | Lisunov, Merkulov 2 | Alfréd Hajós National Swimming Stadium, Budapest; Referees: Georgios Stavridis (GRE), Radosław Koryzna (POL) |

Fifth place game

| 29 July 2017; 13:30 | Report | Montenegro | 5–4 | Italy | Alfréd Hajós National Swimming Stadium, Budapest; Referees: Georgios Stavridis (GRE), Francesc Buch (ESP) |
| 29 July 2017; 13:30 | Report | Score by quarters: 1–1, 1–1, 3–2, 0–0 | | | Alfréd Hajós National Swimming Stadium, Budapest; Referees: Georgios Stavridis (GRE), Francesc Buch (ESP) |
| 29 July 2017; 13:30 | Report | Dr. Brguljan 3 | Goals | Mirarchi 2 | Alfréd Hajós National Swimming Stadium, Budapest; Referees: Georgios Stavridis (GRE), Francesc Buch (ESP) |
