= Montenegro at the 2019 World Aquatics Championships =

- Flag of Montenegro
- FINA code: MNE
- National federation: Vaterpolo i plivački savez Crne Gore
- Website: www.wpolomne.org

World Aquatics Championships appearances (overview)
- 2007; 2009; 2011; 2013; 2015; 2017; 2019; 2022; 2023; 2024

Other related appearances
- Yugoslavia (1973–1991); Serbia and Montenegro (1998–2005)

Montenegro competed at the 2019 World Aquatics Championships in Gwangju, South Korea from 12 to 28 July.

== Swimming ==
Montenegro entered three swimmers.

Men

Athlete	Event	Heat		Semifinal		Final	
Athlete	Event	Time	Rank	Time	Rank	Time	Rank
Ado Gargović	50 m backstroke	28.27	60	did not advance			
Ado Gargović	100 m backstroke	1:01.37	59	did not advance			
Boško Radulović	50 m freestyle	24.21	=79	did not advance			
Boško Radulović	50 m butterfly	25.11	56	did not advance			

Women

Athlete	Event	Heat		Semifinal		Final	
Athlete	Event	Time	Rank	Time	Rank	Time	Rank
Anđela Antunović	100 m freestyle	1:01.38	72	did not advance			
Anđela Antunović	200 m freestyle	2:13.62	50	did not advance			

== Water polo ==
=== Men's tournament ===
Team roster

- Dejan Lazović
- Draško Brguljan (C)
- Đuro Radović
- Marko Petković
- Uroš Čučković
- Aleksa Ukropina
- Mlađan Janović
- Bogdan Đurđić
- Aleksandar Ivović
- Vladan Spaić
- Dragan Drašković
- Nikola Murišić
- Slaven Kandić
- Coach: Vladimir Gojković

Group A

Pos	Team	Pld	W	D	L	GF	GA	GD	Pts	Qualification
1	Serbia	3	2	1	0	41	15	+26	5	Quarterfinals
2	Montenegro	3	1	2	0	44	26	+18	4	Playoffs
3	Greece	3	1	1	1	39	22	+17	3	Playoffs
4	South Korea (H)	3	0	0	3	11	72	−61	0	

Source: Sportresult
Rules for classification: 1) points; 2) head-to-head points; 3) head-to-head goal difference; 4) head-to-head number of goals scored; 5) Goal difference.
(H) Hosts

15 July 2019; 08:30	Report	Serbia	10–10	Montenegro	Nambu University Aquatics Center, Gwangju; Referees: Arkadi Voevodin (RUS), Michiel Zwart (NED)
15 July 2019; 08:30	Report	Score by quarters: 4–3, 2–2, 2–4, 2–1			Nambu University Aquatics Center, Gwangju; Referees: Arkadi Voevodin (RUS), Michiel Zwart (NED)
15 July 2019; 08:30	Report	S. Rašović 4	Goals	four players 2	Nambu University Aquatics Center, Gwangju; Referees: Arkadi Voevodin (RUS), Michiel Zwart (NED)

17 July 2019; 19:10	Report	Greece	10–10	Montenegro	Nambu University Aquatics Center, Gwangju; Referees: Adrian Alexandrescu (ROU), Alessandro Severo (ITA)
17 July 2019; 19:10	Report	Score by quarters: 3–3, 1–2, 4–4, 2–1			Nambu University Aquatics Center, Gwangju; Referees: Adrian Alexandrescu (ROU), Alessandro Severo (ITA)
17 July 2019; 19:10	Report	three players 2	Goals	Janović 3	Nambu University Aquatics Center, Gwangju; Referees: Adrian Alexandrescu (ROU), Alessandro Severo (ITA)

19 July 2019; 17:50	Report	South Korea	6–24	Montenegro	Nambu University Aquatics Center, Gwangju; Referees: Alessandro Severo (ITA), Ni Shi Wei (CHN)
19 July 2019; 17:50	Report	Score by quarters: 1–6, 1–4, 1–8, 3–6			Nambu University Aquatics Center, Gwangju; Referees: Alessandro Severo (ITA), Ni Shi Wei (CHN)
19 July 2019; 17:50	Report	Han H., Lee Seonu. 2	Goals	Ivović 6	Nambu University Aquatics Center, Gwangju; Referees: Alessandro Severo (ITA), Ni Shi Wei (CHN)

Playoffs

21 July 2019; 14:00	Report	Montenegro	11–13	Australia	Nambu University Aquatics Center, Gwangju; Referees: Michael Goldenberg (USA), Viktor Salnichenko (KAZ)
21 July 2019; 14:00	Report	Score by quarters: 1–3, 3–2, 4–2, 1–2 PSO: 2–4			Nambu University Aquatics Center, Gwangju; Referees: Michael Goldenberg (USA), Viktor Salnichenko (KAZ)
21 July 2019; 14:00	Report	Ivović 3	Goals	Kayes 4	Nambu University Aquatics Center, Gwangju; Referees: Michael Goldenberg (USA), Viktor Salnichenko (KAZ)

9th–12th place semifinals

23 July 2019; 11:00	Report	Montenegro	14–7	Japan	Nambu University Aquatics Center, Gwangju; Referees: Germán Moller (ARG), Alessandro Severo (ITA)
23 July 2019; 11:00	Report	Score by quarters: 3–2, 4–1, 4–3, 3–1			Nambu University Aquatics Center, Gwangju; Referees: Germán Moller (ARG), Alessandro Severo (ITA)
23 July 2019; 11:00	Report	Ivović, Murišić 3	Goals	Arai, Inaba 2	Nambu University Aquatics Center, Gwangju; Referees: Germán Moller (ARG), Alessandro Severo (ITA)

Ninth place game

25 July 2019; 11:00	Report	Montenegro	14–15	United States	Nambu University Aquatics Center, Gwangju; Referees: Frank Ohme (GER), Daniel Flahive (AUS)
25 July 2019; 11:00	Report	Score by quarters: 2–4, 6–4, 4–4, 2–3			Nambu University Aquatics Center, Gwangju; Referees: Frank Ohme (GER), Daniel Flahive (AUS)
25 July 2019; 11:00	Report	Ivović 6	Goals	Hooper 4	Nambu University Aquatics Center, Gwangju; Referees: Frank Ohme (GER), Daniel Flahive (AUS)
