= Montenegro at the 2024 World Aquatics Championships =

- Flag of Montenegro
- FINA code: MNE
- National federation: Montenegro Swimming Federation

in Doha, Qatar
- Competitors: 17 in 2 sports
- Medals: Gold 0 Silver 0 Bronze 0 Total 0

World Aquatics Championships appearances (overview)
- 2007; 2009; 2011; 2013; 2015; 2017; 2019; 2022; 2023; 2024

Other related appearances
- Yugoslavia (1973–1991); Serbia and Montenegro (1998–2005)

Montenegro competed at the 2024 World Aquatics Championships in Doha, Qatar from 2 to 18 February.

== Competitors ==
The following is the list of competitors in the Championships.

Sport	Men	Women	Total
Swimming	1	1	1
Water polo	15	0	15
Total	16	1	17

== Swimming ==
Montenegro entered 2 swimmers.

Men

Athlete	Event	Heat		Semifinal		Final	
Athlete	Event	Time	Rank	Time	Rank	Time	Rank
Miloš Milenković	50 metre butterfly	24.17 NR	32	Did not advance			
Miloš Milenković	100 metre butterfly	Did not start		Did not advance			

Women

Athlete	Event	Heat		Semifinal		Final	
Athlete	Event	Time	Rank	Time	Rank	Time	Rank
Jovana Kuljaca	50 metre freestyle	27.71	64	Did not advance			
Jovana Kuljaca	100 metre freestyle	1:01.36	52	Did not advance			

== Water polo ==
Summary

Team	Event	Group stage				Playoff	Quarterfinal	Semifinal	Final / BM	
Team	Event	Opposition Score	Opposition Score	Opposition Score	Rank	Opposition Score	Opposition Score	Opposition Score	Opposition Score	Rank
Montenegro	Men's tournament	United States; W 16–15	Serbia; L 4–16	Japan; W 13–11	2 PO	Romania; W 12–9	Spain; L 12–15	Greece; L 13–14	Hungary; L 16–18	8

=== Men's tournament ===
Team roster

The following is the Montenegrin roster.

Head coach: Vladimir Gojković

- 1 Lazar Andrić GK
- 2 Draško Brguljan FP
- 3 Miroslav Perković FP
- 4 Kanstantsin Averka FP
- 5 Aljoša Macic FP
- 6 Vlado Popadić FP
- 7 Stefan Vidović FP
- 8 Đuro Radović FP
- 9 Aleksa Ukropina FP
- 10 Vladan Spaić FP
- 11 Dušan Matković FP
- 12 Vasilije Radović FP
- 13 Petar Tešanović GK
- 14 Marko Mršić FP
- 15 Jovan Vujović FP

Group play

Pos	Team	Pld	W	PSW	PSL	L	GF	GA	GD	Pts	Qualification
1	Serbia	3	3	0	0	0	45	28	+17	9	Quarterfinals
2	Montenegro	3	1	1	0	1	30	36	−6	5	Playoffs
3	United States	3	1	0	1	1	41	30	+11	4	Playoffs
4	Japan	3	0	0	0	3	26	48	−22	0	13–16th place semifinals

Source: World Aquatics
Rules for classification: 1) points; 2) head-to-head points; 3) head-to-head goal difference; 4) head-to-head number of goals scored; 5) Goal difference.

5 February 2024; 17:30	Report	Montenegro	16–15	United States	Aspire Dome, Doha; Referees: Boris Margeta (SLO), Frank Ohme (GER)
5 February 2024; 17:30	Report	Score by quarters: 3–1, 2–3, 4–3, 2–4 PSO: 5–4			Aspire Dome, Doha; Referees: Boris Margeta (SLO), Frank Ohme (GER)
5 February 2024; 17:30	Report	three players 2	Goals	Bowen 5	Aspire Dome, Doha; Referees: Boris Margeta (SLO), Frank Ohme (GER)

7 February 2024; 17:30	Report	Serbia	14–6	Montenegro	Aspire Dome, Doha; Referees: Michiel Zwart (NED), Andrej Franulović (CRO)
7 February 2024; 17:30	Report	Score by quarters: 4–1, 2–2, 5–3, 3–0			Aspire Dome, Doha; Referees: Michiel Zwart (NED), Andrej Franulović (CRO)
7 February 2024; 17:30	Report	Mandić 4	Goals	six players 1	Aspire Dome, Doha; Referees: Michiel Zwart (NED), Andrej Franulović (CRO)

9 February 2024; 09:00	Report	Montenegro	13–11	Japan	Aspire Dome, Doha; Referees: Michiel Zwart (NED), Frank Ohme (GER)
9 February 2024; 09:00	Report	Score by quarters: 3–2, 2–3, 4–0, 4–6			Aspire Dome, Doha; Referees: Michiel Zwart (NED), Frank Ohme (GER)
9 February 2024; 09:00	Report	Matković 4	Goals	Watanabe 5	Aspire Dome, Doha; Referees: Michiel Zwart (NED), Frank Ohme (GER)

Playoffs

11 February 2024; 17:30	Report	Montenegro	12–9	Romania	Aspire Dome, Doha; Referees: György Kun (HUN), Alessandro Severo (ITA)
11 February 2024; 17:30	Report	Score by quarters: 3–5, 4–1, 2–2, 3–1			Aspire Dome, Doha; Referees: György Kun (HUN), Alessandro Severo (ITA)
11 February 2024; 17:30	Report	Averka, Perković 3	Goals	Fulea 3	Aspire Dome, Doha; Referees: György Kun (HUN), Alessandro Severo (ITA)

Quarterfinals

13 February 2024; 16:00	Report	Spain	15–12	Montenegro	Aspire Dome, Doha; Referees: Michiel Zwart (NED), Andrej Franulović (CRO)
13 February 2024; 16:00	Report	Score by quarters: 5–2, 3–5, 5–0, 2–5			Aspire Dome, Doha; Referees: Michiel Zwart (NED), Andrej Franulović (CRO)
13 February 2024; 16:00	Report	Perrone 5	Goals	Mršić 4	Aspire Dome, Doha; Referees: Michiel Zwart (NED), Andrej Franulović (CRO)

5–8th place semifinals

15 February 2024; 12:00	Report	Montenegro	13–14	Greece	Aspire Dome, Doha; Referees: Alessandro Severo (ITA), Xavi Buch (ESP)
15 February 2024; 12:00	Report	Score by quarters: 2–2, 3–4, 1–2, 4–2 PSO: 3–4			Aspire Dome, Doha; Referees: Alessandro Severo (ITA), Xavi Buch (ESP)
15 February 2024; 12:00	Report	Đ. Radović 3	Goals	Kakaris 3	Aspire Dome, Doha; Referees: Alessandro Severo (ITA), Xavi Buch (ESP)

Seventh place game

17 February 2024; 10:00	Report	Montenegro	16–18	Hungary	Aspire Dome, Doha; Referees: Alessandro Severo (ITA), Andreia Stanojević (SRB)
17 February 2024; 10:00	Report	Score by quarters: 3–4, 3–2, 3–3, 5–5 PSO: 2–4			Aspire Dome, Doha; Referees: Alessandro Severo (ITA), Andreia Stanojević (SRB)
17 February 2024; 10:00	Report	Vujović 4	Goals	Zalánki 4	Aspire Dome, Doha; Referees: Alessandro Severo (ITA), Andreia Stanojević (SRB)
