= Montenegro at the 2023 World Aquatics Championships =

- Flag of Montenegro
- FINA code: MNE
- National federation: Montenegro Swimming Federation

in Fukuoka, Japan
- Competitors: 17 in 2 sports
- Medals: Gold 0 Silver 0 Bronze 0 Total 0

World Aquatics Championships appearances (overview)
- 2007; 2009; 2011; 2013; 2015; 2017; 2019; 2022; 2023; 2024

Other related appearances
- Yugoslavia (1973–1991); Serbia and Montenegro (1998–2005)

Montenegro is set to compete at the 2023 World Aquatics Championships in Fukuoka, Japan from 14 to 30 July.

== Swimming ==
Montenegro entered 2 swimmers.

Men

Athlete	Event	Heat		Semifinal		Final	
Athlete	Event	Time	Rank	Time	Rank	Time	Rank
Ado Gargović	100 metre freestyle	53.97	88	Did not advance			
Ado Gargović	200 metre freestyle	1:57.81	60	Did not advance			

Women

Athlete	Event	Heat		Semifinal		Final	
Athlete	Event	Time	Rank	Time	Rank	Time	Rank
Jovana Kuljaca	50 metre freestyle	28.23	67	Did not advance			
Jovana Kuljaca	100 metre freestyle	1:02.31	62	Did not advance			

== Water polo ==
Summary

Team	Event	Group stage				Playoff	Quarterfinal	Semifinal	Final / BM	
Team	Event	Opposition Score	Opposition Score	Opposition Score	Rank	Opposition Score	Opposition Score	Opposition Score	Opposition Score	Rank
Montenegro	Men's tournament	South Africa; W 35–10	Spain; L 7–11	Serbia; L 15–17	3 QP	Croatia; W 13–12	Greece; L 9–10	Italy; L 6–10	United States; L 15–17	8

=== Men's tournament ===
Team roster

The following is the Montenegrin roster.

Head coach: Vladimir Gojković

- 1 Lazar Andrić GK
- 2 Aljoša Mačić FP
- 3 Miroslav Perković FP
- 4 Kanstantsin Averka FP
- 5 Uroš Čučković FP
- 6 Vlado Popadić FP
- 7 Stefan Vidović FP
- 8 Bogdan Đurđić FP
- 9 Aleksa Ukropina FP
- 10 Vladan Spaić FP
- 11 Dušan Matković FP
- 12 Vasilije Radović FP
- 13 Petar Tešanović GK
- Đuro Radović FP
- Jovan Vujović FP

Group play

Pos	Team	Pld	W	PSW	PSL	L	GF	GA	GD	Pts	Qualification
1	Spain	3	3	0	0	0	54	27	+27	9	Quarterfinals
2	Serbia	3	1	1	0	1	57	34	+23	5	Playoffs
3	Montenegro	3	1	0	1	1	55	34	+21	4	Playoffs
4	South Africa	3	0	0	0	3	21	92	−71	0	

Source: Sportresult
Rules for classification: 1) points; 2) head-to-head points; 3) head-to-head goal difference; 4) head-to-head number of goals scored; 5) Goal difference.

17 July 2023; 17:30	Report	Montenegro	35–10	South Africa	Marine Messe Fukuoka, Fukuoka; Referees: Sebastien Dervieux (FRA), Georgios Stavridis (GRE)
17 July 2023; 17:30	Report	Score by quarters: 6–1, 10–0, 9–5, 10–4			Marine Messe Fukuoka, Fukuoka; Referees: Sebastien Dervieux (FRA), Georgios Stavridis (GRE)
17 July 2023; 17:30	Report	Radović 7	Goals	four players 2	Marine Messe Fukuoka, Fukuoka; Referees: Sebastien Dervieux (FRA), Georgios Stavridis (GRE)

19 July 2023; 13:30	Report	Spain	11–7	Montenegro	Marine Messe Fukuoka, Fukuoka; Referees: Georgios Stavridis (GRE), Sebastien Dervieux (FRA)
19 July 2023; 13:30	Report	Score by quarters: 2–2, 3–2, 4–2, 2–1			Marine Messe Fukuoka, Fukuoka; Referees: Georgios Stavridis (GRE), Sebastien Dervieux (FRA)
19 July 2023; 13:30	Report	Perrone 5	Goals	Đurđić 2	Marine Messe Fukuoka, Fukuoka; Referees: Georgios Stavridis (GRE), Sebastien Dervieux (FRA)

21 July 2023; 12:00	Report	Serbia	17–15	Montenegro	Marine Messe Fukuoka, Fukuoka; Referees: Adrian-Tiberiu Alexandrescu (ROU), Darren Spiritsanto (USA)
21 July 2023; 12:00	Report	Score by quarters: 3–6, 4–2, 2–3, 4–2 PSO: 4–2			Marine Messe Fukuoka, Fukuoka; Referees: Adrian-Tiberiu Alexandrescu (ROU), Darren Spiritsanto (USA)
21 July 2023; 12:00	Report	Vučinić 5	Goals	Matković 3	Marine Messe Fukuoka, Fukuoka; Referees: Adrian-Tiberiu Alexandrescu (ROU), Darren Spiritsanto (USA)

Playoffs

23 July 2023; 17:00	Report	Croatia	12–13	Montenegro	Marine Messe Fukuoka, Fukuoka; Referees: Boris Margeta (SLO), Michiel Zwartt (NED)
23 July 2023; 17:00	Report	Score by quarters: 3–2, 0–3, 5–4, 4–4			Marine Messe Fukuoka, Fukuoka; Referees: Boris Margeta (SLO), Michiel Zwartt (NED)
23 July 2023; 17:00	Report	Marinić Kragić 4	Goals	Matković, Radović 4	Marine Messe Fukuoka, Fukuoka; Referees: Boris Margeta (SLO), Michiel Zwartt (NED)

Quarterfinals

25 July 2023; 15:00	Report	Greece	10–9	Montenegro	Marine Messe Fukuoka, Fukuoka; Referees: Boris Margeta (SLO), Tamás Kovács-Csatlós (HUN)
25 July 2023; 15:00	Report	Score by quarters: 2–1, 4–3, 1–3, 3–2			Marine Messe Fukuoka, Fukuoka; Referees: Boris Margeta (SLO), Tamás Kovács-Csatlós (HUN)
25 July 2023; 15:00	Report	Genidounias 5	Goals	Radović 3	Marine Messe Fukuoka, Fukuoka; Referees: Boris Margeta (SLO), Tamás Kovács-Csatlós (HUN)

5–8th place semifinals

27 July 2023; 14:00	Report	Montenegro	6–10	Italy	Marine Messe Fukuoka, Fukuoka; Referees: Adrian-Tiberiu Alexandrescu (ROU), Tamás Kovács-Csatlós (HUN)
27 July 2023; 14:00	Report	Score by quarters: 1–1, 1–3, 2–3, 2–3			Marine Messe Fukuoka, Fukuoka; Referees: Adrian-Tiberiu Alexandrescu (ROU), Tamás Kovács-Csatlós (HUN)
27 July 2023; 14:00	Report	Perković 3	Goals	Damonte 3	Marine Messe Fukuoka, Fukuoka; Referees: Adrian-Tiberiu Alexandrescu (ROU), Tamás Kovács-Csatlós (HUN)

Seventh place game

29 July 2023; 11:30	Report	Montenegro	15–17	United States	Marine Messe Fukuoka, Fukuoka; Referees: Matan Schwartz (ISR), Zhang Liang (CHN)
29 July 2023; 11:30	Report	Score by quarters: 3–3, 4–4, 3–3, 2–2 PSO: 3–5			Marine Messe Fukuoka, Fukuoka; Referees: Matan Schwartz (ISR), Zhang Liang (CHN)
29 July 2023; 11:30	Report	three players 2	Goals	Hallock 4	Marine Messe Fukuoka, Fukuoka; Referees: Matan Schwartz (ISR), Zhang Liang (CHN)
