= Montenegro at the 2022 World Aquatics Championships =

- Flag of Montenegro
- FINA code: MNE
- National federation: Vaterpolo i plivački savez Crne Gore
- Website: www.wpolomne.org

in Budapest, Hungary
- Competitors: 15 in 2 sports
- Medals: Gold 0 Silver 0 Bronze 0 Total 0

World Aquatics Championships appearances (overview)
- 2007; 2009; 2011; 2013; 2015; 2017; 2019; 2022; 2023; 2024

Other related appearances
- Yugoslavia (1973–1991); Serbia and Montenegro (1998–2005)

Montenegro competed at the 2022 World Aquatics Championships in Budapest, Hungary, from 17 June to 3 July.

== Swimming ==
Montenegro entered two swimmers.

Men

Athlete	Event	Heat		Semifinal		Final	
Athlete	Event	Time	Rank	Time	Rank	Time	Rank
Ado Gargović	100 m freestyle	53.82	74	did not advance			
Ado Gargović	200 m freestyle	1:57.74	54	did not advance			

Women

Athlete	Event	Heat		Semifinal		Final	
Athlete	Event	Time	Rank	Time	Rank	Time	Rank
Jovana Kuljača	50 m freestyle	28.37	57	did not advance			
Jovana Kuljača	50 m backstroke	32.74	33	did not advance			

== Water polo ==
Summary

Key:
- FT – After full time.
- P – Match decided by penalty-shootout.

Team	Event	Group stage				Playoff	Quarterfinal	Semifinals	Final	
Team	Event	Opposition Score	Opposition Score	Opposition Score	Rank	Opposition Score	Opposition Score	Opposition Score	Opposition Score	Rank
Montenegro	Men's tournament	Hungary; L 8–12	Georgia; W 10–9	Brazil; W 20–5	2	Japan; W 10–9	Spain; L 6–7	5–8th place semifinals Serbia; L 7–10	Seventh place game Hungary; L 6–8	8

Men's tournament

Team roster

The following is Montenegrin roster in the Water polo at the 2022 World Aquatics Championships – Men's tournament.

Head coach: Vladimir Gojković

- 1 Dejan Lazović GK
- 2 Marko Mršić FP
- 3 Uroš Vučurović FP
- 4 Konstantin Averka FP
- 5 Uroš Čučković CB
- 6 Vlado Popadić FP
- 7 Vasilije Radović FP
- 8 Bogdan Đurđić FP
- 9 Miroslav Perković CB
- 10 Dušan Banićević CF
- 11 Dušan Matković FP
- 12 Marko Petković FP
- 13 Petar Tešanović GK

Group play

Pos	Team	Pld	W	D	L	GF	GA	GD	Pts	Qualification
1	Hungary (H)	3	3	0	0	50	28	+22	6	Quarterfinals
2	Montenegro	3	2	0	1	38	26	+12	4	Playoffs
3	Georgia	3	1	0	2	37	38	−1	2	Playoffs
4	Brazil	3	0	0	3	21	54	−33	0	

Source: Sportresult
Rules for classification: 1) points; 2) head-to-head points; 3) head-to-head goal difference; 4) head-to-head number of goals scored; 5) Goal difference.
(H) Hosts

21 June 2022; 21:00	Report	Montenegro	8–12	Hungary	Alfréd Hajós National Swimming Stadium, Budapest; Referees: Michael Goldenberg (USA), Frank Ohme (GER)
21 June 2022; 21:00	Report	Score by quarters: 3–3, 1–3, 2–3, 2–3			Alfréd Hajós National Swimming Stadium, Budapest; Referees: Michael Goldenberg (USA), Frank Ohme (GER)
21 June 2022; 21:00	Report	Petković 4	Goals	Zalánki 4	Alfréd Hajós National Swimming Stadium, Budapest; Referees: Michael Goldenberg (USA), Frank Ohme (GER)

23 June 2022; 19:30	Report	Georgia	9–10	Montenegro	Alfréd Hajós National Swimming Stadium, Budapest; Referees: Pascal Bouchez (FRA), Maro Savinović (CRO)
23 June 2022; 19:30	Report	Score by quarters: 1–4, 3–0, 3–4, 2–2			Alfréd Hajós National Swimming Stadium, Budapest; Referees: Pascal Bouchez (FRA), Maro Savinović (CRO)
23 June 2022; 19:30	Report	Vasić 5	Goals	Đurđić 4	Alfréd Hajós National Swimming Stadium, Budapest; Referees: Pascal Bouchez (FRA), Maro Savinović (CRO)

25 June 2022; 19:30	Report	Brazil	5–20	Montenegro	Alfréd Hajós National Swimming Stadium, Budapest; Referees: Andrew Carney (AUS), Frank Ohme (GER)
25 June 2022; 19:30	Report	Score by quarters: 0–4, 2–6, 0–7, 3–3			Alfréd Hajós National Swimming Stadium, Budapest; Referees: Andrew Carney (AUS), Frank Ohme (GER)
25 June 2022; 19:30	Report	five players 1	Goals	three players 3	Alfréd Hajós National Swimming Stadium, Budapest; Referees: Andrew Carney (AUS), Frank Ohme (GER)

Playoffs

27 June 2022; 14:00	Report	Montenegro	10–9	Japan	Alfréd Hajós National Swimming Stadium, Budapest; Referees: Michael Goldenberg (USA), Michiel Zwart (NED)
27 June 2022; 14:00	Report	Score by quarters: 3–1, 2–5, 3–2, 2–1			Alfréd Hajós National Swimming Stadium, Budapest; Referees: Michael Goldenberg (USA), Michiel Zwart (NED)
27 June 2022; 14:00	Report	Perković 3	Goals	Takata 2	Alfréd Hajós National Swimming Stadium, Budapest; Referees: Michael Goldenberg (USA), Michiel Zwart (NED)

Quarterfinals

29 June 2022; 19:30	Report	Spain	7–6	Montenegro	Alfréd Hajós National Swimming Stadium, Budapest; Referees: Michael Goldenberg (USA), Raffaele Colombo (ITA)
29 June 2022; 19:30	Report	Score by quarters: 2–1, 3–2, 1–2, 1–1			Alfréd Hajós National Swimming Stadium, Budapest; Referees: Michael Goldenberg (USA), Raffaele Colombo (ITA)
29 June 2022; 19:30	Report	Mallarach 2	Goals	Đurđić 2	Alfréd Hajós National Swimming Stadium, Budapest; Referees: Michael Goldenberg (USA), Raffaele Colombo (ITA)

5–8th place semifinals

1 July 2022; 14:30	Report	Montenegro	7–10	Serbia	Alfréd Hajós National Swimming Stadium, Budapest; Referees: Georgios Stavridis (GRE), David Gómez (ESP)
1 July 2022; 14:30	Report	Score by quarters: 2–2, 2–3, 2–3, 1–2			Alfréd Hajós National Swimming Stadium, Budapest; Referees: Georgios Stavridis (GRE), David Gómez (ESP)
1 July 2022; 14:30	Report	Đurđić 3	Goals	Jakšić, S. Rašović 3	Alfréd Hajós National Swimming Stadium, Budapest; Referees: Georgios Stavridis (GRE), David Gómez (ESP)

Seventh place game

3 July 2022; 13:00	Report	Hungary	8–6	Montenegro	Alfréd Hajós National Swimming Stadium, Budapest; Referees: Levan Bertishvili (GEO), David Gómez (ESP)
3 July 2022; 13:00	Report	Score by quarters: 1–0, 4–2, 2–1, 1–3			Alfréd Hajós National Swimming Stadium, Budapest; Referees: Levan Bertishvili (GEO), David Gómez (ESP)
3 July 2022; 13:00	Report	Nagy, Zalánki 2	Goals	three players 2	Alfréd Hajós National Swimming Stadium, Budapest; Referees: Levan Bertishvili (GEO), David Gómez (ESP)
