= Nikola Šaranović =

Nikola Šaranović may refer to:

- Nikola Šaranović (sport shooter)
- Nikola Šaranović (basketball)
