= Montenegro at the 2007 World Aquatics Championships =

- Flag of Montenegro
- FINA code: MNE
- National federation: Vaterpolo i plivački savez Crne Gore
- Website: www.wpolomne.org

in Melbourne, Australia
- Competitors: 2 in 1 sports
- Medals: Gold 0 Silver 0 Bronze 0 Total 0

World Aquatics Championships appearances (overview)
- 2007; 2009; 2011; 2013; 2015; 2017; 2019; 2022; 2023; 2024

Other related appearances
- Yugoslavia (1973–1991); Serbia and Montenegro (1998–2005)

Montenegro competed at the 2007 World Aquatics Championships in Melbourne, Australia.

== Swimming ==
2 swimmers represented Montenegro:

Women

Athlete	Event	Heat		Semifinal		Final	
Athlete	Event	Time	Rank	Time	Rank	Time	Rank
Marina Kuc	50 m breaststroke	34.41	31	did not advance			
Marina Kuc	100 m breaststroke	1:12.85	35	did not advance			
Marina Kuc	200 m breaststroke	2:32.59	23	did not advance			
Darija Pop	200 m butterfly	2:35.40	51	did not advance			
