= Montenegro at the World Aquatics Championships =

- Flag of Montenegro
- FINA code: MNE
- National federation: Vaterpolo i plivački savez Crne Gore
- Website: www.wpolomne.org
- Medals: Gold 0 Silver 0 Bronze 0 Total 0

World Aquatics Championships appearances (overview)
- 2007; 2009; 2011; 2013; 2015; 2017; 2019; 2022; 2023; 2024

Other related appearances
- Yugoslavia (1973–1991); Serbia and Montenegro (1998–2005)

Montenegro has sent athletes to every World Aquatics Championships since the country's debut in 2007.

== List of medalists ==
Medal	Name	Championships	Sport	Event
Silver	Men's national team	(Spain) 2013 Barcelona	Water polo	Men's tournament

== Participation table ==
Games	Athletes	Athletes by sport		Medals			Place
Games	Athletes	Swimming	Water polo	Gold medal	Silver medal	Bronze medal	Place
(Australia) 2007 Melbourne	2	2	—	0	0	0	—
(Italy) 2009 Rome	13	—	13	0	0	0	—
(China) 2011 Shanghai	13	—	13	0	0	0	—
(Spain) 2013 Barcelona	13	—	13	0	1	0	24th
(Russia) 2015 Kazan	16	3	13	0	0	0	—
Overall				0	1	0	47th
