= Boško Radulović =

Montenegrin swimmer

Personal information
- Born: 6 October 1996 (age 29)

Sport
- Sport: Swimming

Boško Radulović (born 6 October 1996) is a Montenegrin swimmer. He competed in the men's 50 metre butterfly event at the 2017 World Aquatics Championships.

In 2019, he represented Montenegro at the 2019 World Aquatics Championships held in Gwangju, South Korea and he finished in 79th place in the heats in the men's 50 metre freestyle event. He also competed in the men's 50 metre butterfly event.
