= Nikola Šaranović (sport shooter) =

Montenegrin sport shooter

Nikola Šaranović is a Montenegrin sport shooter who competes in the men's 10 metre air pistol and 50 metre pistol events. At the 2012 Summer Olympics, he finished 41st in the qualifying round, failing to make the cut for the final. He finished last in the 50 metre pistol at the same Games.
