= Dušan Matković =

Montenegrin water polo player

Dušan Matković OLY
Personal information
- Born: 1 February 1999 (age 27) Kotor, FR Yugoslavia
- Height: 190 cm (6 ft 3 in)
- Weight: 85 kg (187 lb)

Sport
- Country: Montenegro
- Sport: Water polo
- Club: VPK Primorac Kotor
Medal record
Men's water polo
Representing Montenegro
LEN Champions League
Bronze medal – third place	2023 Belgrade
FINA World League
Gold medal – first place	2021 Tbilisi
Mediterranean Games
Silver medal – second place	2026 Taranto	Team
Youth European Championship
Silver medal – second place	2018 Minsk
Youth World Championship
Silver medal – second place	2016 Podgorica

Dušan Matković (Serbian Cyrillic: Душан Матковић; born 1 February 1999) is a Montenegrin water polo player. He competed in the 2020 and 2024 Summer Olympics.

Matković was given the honour to carry the national flag of Montenegro at the closing ceremony of the 2020 Summer Olympics in Tokyo, becoming the 30th water polo player to be a flag bearer at the opening and closing ceremonies of the Olympics.

He is currently playing for Jadran.

== Clubs ==
Matković played for VK Primorac Kotor until 2022. He won the National Cup with Primorac in 2021.

In 2022 he transferred to CN Atlètic-Barceloneta. With Barceloneta he won: Copa Catalunya, Super cup of Spain, King's Cup and Spanish Championship. He also won the bronze medal in the 2023 rendition of LEN Champions League.

In August 2023 he transferred to CN Noisy-le-Sec where he played during the 2023/24 club season and became the runner-up of the French water polo championship.

In June 2024 he came back to his maiden club, VPK Primorac Kotor.

== National team ==
Matković became a member of senior national team of Montenegro in 2019. Since then, he competed in all the national team competitions including: FINA Olympic Qualifications tournament, FINA World League Super final 2021, Tokyo 2020 Olympic Games, Budapest 2022 World Aquatics Championship, Split 2022 European Championship, Fukuoka 2023 World Aquatics Championship, Croatia 2024 European Championship, Doha 2024 World Aquatics Championship and Paris 2024 Olympic Games.

As a member of junior national team, Matković won two silver medals, in 2018 at the LEN Youth European Championship in Minsk and in 2016 at the FINA Youth World Championship in Podgorica.

== See also ==
- Montenegro men's Olympic water polo team records and statistics
- List of flag bearers for Montenegro at the Olympics
