= Jovana Terzić =

Montenegrin swimmer

Personal information
- Born: May 15, 1999 (age 27)

Sport
- Sport: Swimming

Jovana Terzić (born May 15, 1999) is a Montenegrin swimmer. She competed at the 2016 Summer Olympics in the women's 100 metre freestyle event; her time of 59.59 seconds in the heats did not qualify her for the semifinals.
