= Milan Tičić =

Montenegrin water polo player

Personal information
- Born: 14 August 1979 (age 46) Cetinje, SFR Yugoslavia
Medal record
Men's Water polo
Representing Montenegro
European Championship
Gold medal – first place	2008 Málaga

Milan Tičić (14 August 1979, Cetinje) is a Montenegrin water polo player who plays for VK Partizan, NOB Glyfada, Rari Nantes Florentia, NC Vouliagmeni, GSS Panionios and VK Budva. Milan won European Waterpolo Championship in Malaga 2008. The epic final was on 13. July against Serbia, Montenegro won 6-5 and Milan scored a goal. He is a member of the Montenegro men's national water polo team at the 2008 Summer Olympics. The team reached the semifinals, where they were defeated by Hungary and finished fourth in the end.
