= Nikola Janović =

Montenegrin water polo player

Personal information
- Born: 22 March 1980 (age 46) Kotor, SFR Yugoslavia

Sport
- Sport: Water polo
Medal record
Representing Serbia and Montenegro
World Championship
Gold medal – first place	2005 Montreal
European Championship
Gold medal – first place	2001 Budapest
Representing Montenegro
World Championship
Silver medal – second place	2013 Barcelona
European Championship
Gold medal – first place	2008 Málaga
Silver medal – second place	2012 Eindhoven
Silver medal – second place	2016 Belgrade

Nikola Janović (Montenegrin Cyrillic: Никола Јановић; born 22 March 1980) is a Montenegrin water polo player and the former Minister of Sports and Youth of Montenegro. He was a water polo player and captain of the Montenegro men's national water polo team. He is a member of the Parliament of Montenegro.

== Personal life and Career ==
Janović is the elder brother of Mlađan Janović.

In 2012, Janović was part of the Montenegrin water polo team that once again reached the semi-finals of the Olympic men's water polo competition. Janović played for PVK Primorac (1994–1998), VK Crvena zvezda (1998–2000), VK Bečej (2000–2001), PVK Primorac (2001–2004), PVK Jadran (2004–2006), CN Posillipo (2006–2009), PVK Jadran (2009–2011) and VK Jug (2011–2016).

He is a World and European champion with SRJ, Serbia and Montenegro, and Montenegro (2001, 2005, 2008).

== See also ==
- List of world champions in men's water polo
- List of World Aquatics Championships medalists in water polo

Sporting positions
Preceded by Veljko Uskoković	Montenegro captain 2009–2016	Succeeded by Draško Brguljan
Awards
Preceded by Bojana Popović and Katarina Bulatović	Montenegrin Sportsperson of the Year; 2013	Succeeded by Katarina Bulatović and Mlađan Janović
