= Aleksandar Radović (water polo) =

Montenegrin water polo player

Personal information
- Born: 24 February 1987 (age 39) Dubrovnik, SFR Yugoslavia
- Height: 191 cm (6 ft 3 in)
- Weight: 98 kg (216 lb)

Sport
- Sport: Water Polo
Medal record
Men's Water Polo
Representing Montenegro
European Championship
Silver medal – second place	2012 Eindhoven	Team competition
Silver medal – second place	2016 Belgrade	Team competition

Aleksandar Radović (Serbian Cyrillic: Александар Радовић; born 24 February 1987) is a water polo player of Montenegro. Radović competed at the 2012 Summer Olympics Radović was part of the Montenegrin team at the 2015 World Aquatics Championships. Radović competed at the 2012 Summer Olympics and the 2016 Summer Olympics.

== See also ==
- Montenegro at the 2015 World Aquatics Championships
