= Vjekoslav Pasković =

Montenegrin water polo player

Personal information
- Born: 23 March 1985 (age 41)
Medal record
Men's Water polo
Representing Serbia and Montenegro
Mediterranean Games
Bronze medal – third place	2005 Almería	Team competition
Universiade
Gold medal – first place	2005 Izmir	Team competition
Representing Montenegro
World Championships
Silver medal – second place	2013 Barcelona	Team competition
European Championship
Gold medal – first place	2008 Málaga	Team Competition
Silver medal – second place	2012 Eindhoven	Team Competition
Silver medal – second place	2016 Belgrade	Team Competition
FINA World League
Bronze medal – third place	2013 Chelyabinsk	Team competition

Vjekoslav Pasković (born 23 March 1985 in Tivat, Montenegro) is a Montenegrin water polo player. He is a member of the Montenegro men's national water polo team at the 2008 Summer Olympics. The team reached the semifinals, where they were defeated by Hungary in the semifinal and finished fourth after losing to Serbia in the bronze medal match. He was also part of the team at the 2012 Olympics, where Montenegro again reached the semifinals, losing to Croatia this time, and then they again lost to Serbia in the bronze medal match.

He is 5 foot 11 and weighs 183 lbs and played for the Montenegrin club Primorac Kotor.

Pasković was part of the Primorac team who participated in the 2009 water polo Euroleague Final Four held in Rijeka, which Primorac won.

He is currently playing for Galatasaray.

== See also ==
- Montenegro men's Olympic water polo team records and statistics
- List of World Aquatics Championships medalists in water polo
