= Đuro Radović =

Montenegrin water polo player

Personal information
- Nationality: Montenegrin
- Born: 20 February 1999 (age 27) Kotor, FR Yugoslavia

Sport
- Sport: Water polo
- Handedness: Left
- Position: Right Wing / Right Driver

Senior clubs
- Years: Team
- 2014–2021: PVK Jadran
National team
- Years: Team
- 2017–: Montenegro
Medal record
Men's water polo
Representing Montenegro
European Championship
Bronze medal – third place	2020 Budapest
FINA World League
Gold medal – first place	2018 Budapest
Mediterranean Games
Silver medal – second place	2026 Taranto	Team
Bronze medal – third place	2018 Tarragona	Team
Youth European Championship
Silver medal – second place	2018 Minsk

Đuro Radović (Serbian Cyrillic: Ђуро Радовић; born 20 February 1999) is a water polo player for Montenegro. Đuro started playing water polo at PVK Jadran, and he is a member of a first squad since 2014.

Radović also plays for a senior Montenegro men's national water polo team. He played at 2017 World Aquatics Championships in Budapest and won 5-th place.

== Honours ==
=== Club ===
PVK Jadran

- LEN Euro Cup runners-up : 2018–19
- Montenegrin Championship: 2014–15, 2015–16, 2016–17, 2017–18, 2018–19, 2020–21, 2022–23
- Montenegrin Cup: 2014–15, 2015–16, 2016–17, 2017–18, 2018–19, 2019–20, 2020–21

=== Individual ===
- FINA World League Best Young Player: 2018 Budapest
- Adriatic League Young Player of the Year: 2019
- Montenegrin Championship MVP: 2020–21
- Montenegrin Championship Top Scorer: 2020–21
- Montenegrin Championship Right Wing of the Year: 2014–15, 2015–16, 2016–17, 2017–18, 2018–19, 2020–21
