= Darko Brguljan =

Montenegrin water polo player

Personal information
- Born: 5 November 1990 (age 35)
- Height: 187 cm (6 ft 2 in)
- Weight: 97 kg (214 lb)

Sport
- Sport: Water polo
- Club: VK Primorje Rijeka
Medal record
Representing Montenegro
World Championships
Silver medal – second place	2013 Barcelona	team
European Championship
Silver medal – second place	2016 Belgrade	team

Darko Brguljan (Montenegrin: Дарко Бргуљан; born 5 November 1990) is a water polo player from Montenegro. He was part of the Montenegrin team at the 2016 Summer Olympics, where the team finished in fourth place.

== See also ==
- List of World Aquatics Championships medalists in water polo
