= Mlađan Janović =

Montenegrin water polo player

Personal information
- Nationality: Montenegro
- Born: 12 June 1984 (age 42) Kotor, SR Montenegro, SFR Yugoslavia

Sport
- Sport: Water polo

Senior clubs
- Years: Team
- 2004–2008 2008–2009 2009–2013 2013–2014 2014–2016 2016–2017 2017–2018: PVK Primorac; CN Marseille; PVK Primorac; RN Savona; Pro Recco; Galatasaray; Olympiacos; AN Brescia
Medal record
Men's Water polo
Representing Serbia and Montenegro
Mediterranean Games
Bronze medal – third place	2005 Almería	Team competition
Representing Montenegro
World Championships
Silver medal – second place	2013 Barcelona	Team competition
European Championship
Gold medal – first place	2008 Málaga	Team competition
Silver medal – second place	2012 Eindhoven	Team competition
Silver medal – second place	2016 Belgrade	Team competition
FINA World League
Gold medal – first place	2009 Podgorica	Team competition
Silver medal – second place	2010 Niš	Team competition
Bronze medal – third place	2014 Dubai	Team competition

Mlađan Janović (Montenegrin Cyrillic: Млађан Јановић; born 12 June 1984) is a Montenegrin water polo player. He currently plays for AN Brescia and he is a long-standing member of the Montenegrin national water polo team. He was part of the Montenegro national team that was crowned European Champion at the 2008 European Championship in Málaga.

== Career ==
At club level, he played for his local club VK Primorac Kotor and was also a member of Pro Recco, Olympiacos, CN Marseille and RN Savona. Janović was a member of the Montenegro men's national water polo team who finished 4th in the 2008 Games of the XXIX Olympiad in Beijing. This was his first Olympic Games participation. The team was defeated by Hungary in the semifinals and by Serbia in the bronze medal match.

Montenegro won the gold medal at the 2008 Men's European Water Polo Championship in Malaga defeating Serbia 6–5 in the final. He is the younger brother of Nikola Janović. Montenegro finished in 1 place at the 2009 FINA Men's Water Polo World League.

== Honours ==
CN Marseille

- French Championship: 2006–07, 2007–08
- French Cup: 2006–07

VK Primorac Kotor

- LEN Champions League: 2008–09
- Montenegrin Cup: 2008–009

Savona

- LEN Euro Cup: 2010–11, 2011–12

Pro Recco

- Serie A1: 2013–14
- Coppa Italia: 2013–14

Galatasaray

- Turkish Championship: 2014–15

Olympiacos

- Greek Championship: 2016–17

== Awards ==
- Olympic Tournament 2008 Pekin Team of the Tournament
- Serie A1 Top Scorer: 2009–10 with Savona
- European Championship MVP: 2012 Eindhoven
- Montenegrin Olympic Committee "Athlete of the Year": 2014
- World League Top Scorer: 2018 Budapest

== See also ==
- Montenegro men's Olympic water polo team records and statistics
- List of men's Olympic water polo tournament top goalscorers
- List of World Aquatics Championships medalists in water polo

Awards
Preceded by (Serbia) Vanja Udovičić	Most Valuable Player of European Water Polo Championship; 2012	Succeeded by (Hungary) Dénes Varga
Preceded by Nikola Janović	Montenegrin Sportsperson of the Year; 2014 (with Katarina Bulatović)	Succeeded by Aleksandar Ivović
