= Predrag Jokić =

Montenegrin water polo player

Personal information
- Born: 3 February 1983 (age 43) Kotor, Yugoslavia

Sport
- Sport: Water polo
Medal record
Representing Serbia and Montenegro
Olympic Games
Silver medal – second place	2004 Athens	Team competition
World Championships
Gold medal – first place	2005 Montreal	Team competition
Bronze medal – third place	2003 Barcelona	Team competition
European Championships
Gold medal – first place	2003 Kranj	Team competition
Representing Montenegro
World Championships
Silver medal – second place	2013 Barcelona	Team competition
European Championship
Gold medal – first place	2008 Málaga	Team competition
Silver medal – second place	2012 Eindhoven	Team competition
Silver medal – second place	2016 Belgrade	Team competition

Predrag Jokić (Montenegrin Cyrillic: Предраг Јокић; born 3 February 1983 in Kotor) is a Montenegrin 1.88 m tall water polo player. He is a member of the Montenegro men's national water polo team at the 2008 Summer Olympics, 2012 Summer Olympics, and the 2016 Summer Olympics. In 2003 he won the gold medal with Serbia and Montenegro at the European Championship in Kranj, Slovenia.

At the 2004 Olympics, he won a silver as a member of Serbia and Montenegro team.

At the 2008 Summer Olympics, the Montenegro team reached the semifinals, where they were defeated by Hungary and Serbia in the bronze medal match.

At the 2012 Summer Olympics, Montenegro lost to Croatia in their semi-final, and then to Serbia again in the bronze medal match.

At the 2016 Summer Olympics, Montenegro lost to Croatia in the semifinals and then lost to Italy in the bronze medal match. Jokić was given the honour to carry the national flag of Montenegro at the closing ceremony of the 2016 Summer Olympics, becoming the 25th water polo player to be a flag bearer at the opening and closing ceremonies of the Olympics.

== See also ==
- Montenegro men's Olympic water polo team records and statistics
- Serbia and Montenegro men's Olympic water polo team records and statistics
- List of Olympic medalists in water polo (men)
- List of players who have appeared in multiple men's Olympic water polo tournaments
- List of flag bearers for Montenegro at the Olympics
- List of world champions in men's water polo
- List of World Aquatics Championships medalists in water polo
