= Vladimir Gojković =

Montenegrin water polo player and coach

Personal information
- Born: 29 January 1981 (age 45) Kotor, SFR Yugoslavia (now Montenegro)
Medal record
Men's water polo
Representing Serbia and Montenegro
Olympic Games
Silver medal – second place	2004 Athens
World Championship
Gold medal – first place	2005 Montreal
Bronze medal – third place	2003 Barcelona
Representing Montenegro
European Championship
Gold medal – first place	2008 Málaga
Silver medal – second place	2012 Eindhoven

Vladimir Gojković (Serbian Cyrillic: Владимир Гојковић; born 29 January 1981) is a Montenegrin former water polo player and current water polo coach of Montenegro national team. He won silver medal as a member of the Serbia and Montenegro team in Athens in 2004. He was a member of the Montenegro men's national water polo team at the 2008 Summer Olympics. The team reached the semi-finals, where they were defeated by Hungary and finished fourth in the end. At the 2012 Summer Olympics, he again played for Montenegro, who again finished fourth, losing to Serbia in the bronze medal play off.

== See also ==
- List of Olympic medalists in water polo (men)
- List of world champions in men's water polo
- List of World Aquatics Championships medalists in water polo
