= Miloš Šćepanović =

Montenegrin water polo player

Personal information
- Born: 9 October 1982 (age 43)
Medal record
Men's water polo
Representing Serbia and Montenegro
Mediterranean Games
Bronze medal – third place	2005 Almería	Team competition
Representing Montenegro
World Championships
Silver medal – second place	2013 Barcelona	Team competition
European Championship
Gold medal – first place	2008 Málaga	Team competition
Silver medal – second place	2012 Eindhoven	Team competition
Silver medal – second place	2016 Belgrade	Team competition

Miloš Šćepanović (Serbian Cyrillic: Милош Шћепановић; born 9 October 1982) is a Montenegrin water polo player. He was a member of the Montenegro men's national water polo team at the 2008 Summer Olympics. There the team reached the semifinals, where it was defeated by Hungary and then met Serbia in the bronze medal match. They were defeated with the score 6:4 for Serbia and finished in 4th place.

He was also a member of the Montenegrin team at the 2012 Summer Olympics. Montenegro again reached the semi-finals, losing to Croatia, and then were again defeated by Serbia in the bronze medal match. The score was 12:11 for Serbia.

== See also ==
- Montenegro men's Olympic water polo team records and statistics
- List of men's Olympic water polo tournament goalkeepers
- List of World Aquatics Championships medalists in water polo
