= Draško Brguljan =

Montenegrin water polo player

Personal information
- Born: 27 December 1984 (age 41) Kotor, SR Montenegro, SFR Yugoslavia
- Height: 1.94 m (6 ft 4 in)

Sport
- Club: Primorac Kotor (–2011); LACTIV-Vasas (2011–2014); A-HÍD OSC Újbuda (2014–)
Medal record
Men's water polo
Representing Serbia and Montenegro
Mediterranean Games
Bronze medal – third place	2005 Almería	Team
Representing Montenegro
World Championships
Silver medal – second place	2013 Barcelona	Team
European Championship
Gold medal – first place	2008 Málaga
Silver medal – second place	2012 Eindhoven
Silver medal – second place	2016 Belgrade
Bronze medal – third place	2020 Budapest
FINA World League
Bronze medal – third place	2013 Chelyabinsk

Draško Brguljan (Montenegrin Cyrillic: Драшко Бргуљан; born 27 December 1984) is a Montenegrin water polo player who is a free agent. He was a member of the Montenegro men's national water polo team at the 2008 Summer Olympics. The team reached the semifinals, where they were defeated by Hungary before losing again to Serbia in the bronze medal match. At the 2012 Summer Olympics, he again played for Montenegro, who were again defeated by Serbia in the bronze medal match, losing 11–12.

Brguljan was given the honour to carry the national flag of Montenegro at the opening ceremony of the 2020 Summer Olympics in Tokyo, becoming the 27th water polo player to be a flag bearer at the opening and closing ceremonies of the Olympics.

== See also ==
- Montenegro men's Olympic water polo team records and statistics
- List of flag bearers for Montenegro at the Olympics
- List of World Aquatics Championships medalists in water polo

Sporting positions
Preceded by Nikola Janović	Montenegro captain 2017–	Succeeded by Incumbent
