= Flag of Montenegro =

Montenegro
- Use: National flag, civil and state ensign
- Proportion: 1:2
- Adopted: July 13, 2004; 22 years ago
- Design: A red field surrounded by a golden border; charged with the coat of arms at the centre. The coat of arms in the flag occupies 2/3 of its height. The width of the golden border is 1/20 the width of the hoist side
- Designed by: Radoslav Rotković
- Use: National flag, vertical banner

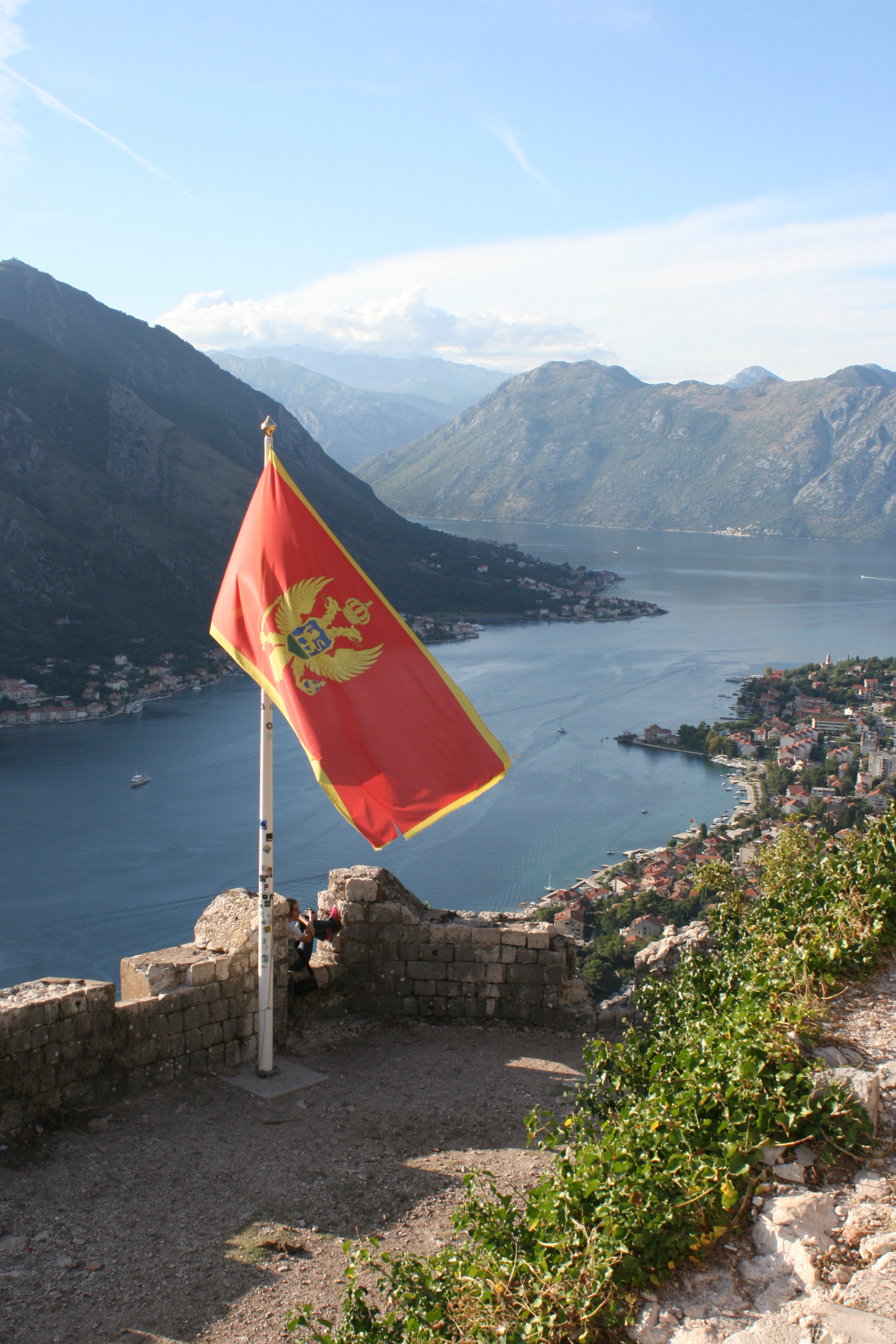
Montenegrin flag

The national flag of Montenegro (zastava Crne Gore) has a red field with gold border and the coat of arms of Montenegro in its center. It was officially adopted on 13 July 2004, when the then Republic of Montenegro was a constituent of the State Union of Serbia and Montenegro, and its precise specification was standardized on 16 September 2004. The flag was retained after Montenegrin independence in 2006, and mandated by Article 4 of the Constitution of Montenegro adopted in 2007.

== Description ==
The flag of Montenegro is red, with the coat of arms in the middle, and golden borders. The ratio of the flag is 1:2. The coat of arms takes up 2/3 of the flag's height. The middle point of the coat of arms matches the middle point of the flag. The width of the border is 1/20 of the flag's height. Two versions of the Montenegrin flag are in use, horizontal, mostly used outdoors; and vertical, mostly used indoors.

== Use of flag ==
The flag is permanently hoisted on:

- the Parliament of Montenegro;
- buildings which are official premises of the President of the Republic, the Prime Minister, the Chairman of the High Court, the Chairman of the Constitutional Court, the Supreme State Attorney and the Human Rights Ombudsman;
- the residence of the President of Montenegro.

The flag is also hoisted on:

- the statehood day of Montenegro and in days of other state holidays of Montenegro, on buildings in which are seated state bodies and other bodies of government
- buildings of the representations of Montenegro abroad;
- aircraft, ships and other vessels according to special regulations;
- voting sites during elections and referendums;
- mourning days determined by the Government, half-masted.

The flag may also be hoisted during international meetings, political, scientific, cultural, artistic, sporting and other manifestations in which Montenegro is represented, according to the rules of such events.

According to international tradition, when the flag is hoisted together with one or more flags of other states or international organizations on Montenegrin soil, the flag takes the place of honour. The place of honour is considered the center of a circle, the top of a semicircle, the first place in a row, column or a group of flags, the central position between the flags and the left side as seen from the front from the flags of other states or international organizations.

The flag is hoisted, lowered and carried with the usual honors (standing up, saluting etc.) The flag can not be hoisted so as to touch the ground, nor should be used as a table cloth, curtain or similar.

== Historical ==
The historical war flags were the krstaš-barjak, plain flags with crosses in the center.

- The Montenegrin war flag used in the Battle of Vučji Do (1876) was red with a white cross pattée in the center and a white border. This flag was used as the military flag during the Montenegrin-Ottoman wars. The same flag was used in Cetinje in 1878, upon the recognition of independence by the Ottoman Empire at San Stefano. During the struggle with the Ottomans, which was waged between Christian Montenegro and the Islamic Ottoman Empire during the early modern period, the religious aspect of the liberation struggle was expressed through the use of various flags depicting the Christian cross, which were called Crusader banners due to their basic motif.
- According to the 1905 constitution, the national flag was a tricolour of red-bluish-white, which were the colours of the Montenegrin folk costume.

Flags as the state symbols were introduced only in the time of Petar II Petrović-Njegoš. Before him, the principal Montenegrin flag had been the alaj-barjak (regimental colors) with a single symbol on it – the cross (krst). The first written description of a Montenegrin flag dates from the time of Šćepan Mali: it was white, with a red frame and a golden cross on top of the spear. The next comes from 1838: pale-yellow with the small red cross, and in 1876 the flag was described as red with a white cross. At the time of Prince Danilo, the cross on the alaj-barjak was replaced by the two-headed eagle with the initials DI (Danilo I) on its breast, with the lion passant underneath. Prince/King Nikola used many different flags in his time. The first of the variants was the same as Danilo's, differing only in the initials – NI (Nikola I). Around 1910, two new variants appeared: one tricolor (red, blue and white) with the two-headed eagle bearing the initials NI on its breast and the lion passant on the sinister, the other with the two-headed eagle above the initials NI.

Since Montenegro was subject to the Venetian Republic for various reasons from the 16th to the 18th centuries, whose flags featured a heraldic lion, this symbol began to be used in Montenegro after the introduction of the Venetian governorship, as the emblem of the supreme Venetian authority. In addition to this symbol of foreign power, traditional representations of the double-headed eagle also appeared on the flags. The use of this heraldic symbol had a long prehistory, dating back to medieval times, when the Zeta region was part of the Nemanjić and Crnojević states. In later times, the depictions of double-headed eagles on the flags of Montenegro were modeled after the flags of the Russian Empire, and the Russian white-blue-red tricolor became the model for the design of the national Serbian flag in the early 19th century, which was made official in the reverse order of colors (red-blue-white).

In late 1946 a new flag was adopted for the People's Republic of Montenegro as a constituent republic of the Federal People's Republic of Yugoslavia. The flags of several Yugoslav Republics used their traditional tricolors, with the monarchic coat of arms replaced by the red star of Communism. The replacement left the flags of SR Serbia and SR Montenegro identical.

After the 1991–1992 breakup of SFR Yugoslavia, a noncommunist "rump" Federal Republic of Yugoslavia (also known as Serbia and Montenegro) was formed by the Republic of Serbia and Republic of Montenegro. In 1993 the latter adopted as its flag a horizontal tricolor of red, light blue and white, with the size ratio of 1:3, making it the longest national flag in the world.

Increased Montenegrin nationalism saw FR Yugoslavia replaced in 2003 by the looser State Union of Serbia and Montenegro, which failed to prevent a 2006 Montenegrin independence referendum precipitating the dissolution of the union. During this period, in 2004 the Assembly of the Republic of Montenegro passed the "Law on State Symbols and the Day of the Statehood of Montenegro" including a new, distinctive flag, based on an old royal banner. It was promulgated in the official gazette on 12 July 2004 and came into force the following day, which was proclaimed Statehood Day. The July law gave the government 60 days to produce a comprehensive specification; in fact this was finalized on 16 September 2004 and published the next day. In the interim, some flag manufacturers had interpreted the July law's zlatnim obrubom "gold border" as a fringe rather than a bordure; the latter interpretation was confirmed by the September specification. On the day of proclaiming independence flag of 2004 became Montenegro's national flag.

The flag is mandated by Article 4 of the Constitution of Montenegro adopted in 2007. The provisions relating to the flag in the 2004 Law on State Symbols were affected by subsequent amendments in 2011 and 2019. An updated flag protocol was published in 2020.

=== Historical flags of Montenegro ===
Flag	Date	Use	Description
	1451–1496	Flag of medieval Montenegrin state Zeta	Red flag with golden two-headed eagle.
	1516–1852	Flag of the Prince-Bishopric of Montenegro	White cross pattée on red background.
	1767–1773	Flag of Montenegro during the reign of Stephen the Little	White background with red borders.
	1852–1860	Flag of the Principality of Montenegro under Danilo I	Red flag with white two-headed eagle over a lion.
	1860–1905	Flag of the Principality of Montenegro under Nicholas I	Red flag with white two-headed eagle over a lion.
	1905–1918	Top: State flag of the Principality (1905–10) and the Kingdom of Montenegro (1910–18) Bottom: Civil flag of the Principality (1905–10) and the Kingdom of Montenegro (1910–18)	Top: Red-blue-white tricolor with white two-headed eagle. Bottom: Red-blue-white tricolor.
	1945–1993	Flag of the People's/Socialist Republic of Montenegro	Red-blue-white traditional tricolor with the communist red star.
	1993–2004	Flag of the Republic of Montenegro	Red-bluish-white with equal width, with "bluish" (plavetna/плаветна) meaning light-blue.
	2004–present	Flag of the Republic of Montenegro/Montenegro	

== See also ==
- Montenegro
- List of flags of Montenegro
- Coat of arms of Montenegro
- Armorial of Montenegro

== Sources ==
- Ministry of Education, Science, Culture and Sports (18 February 2020). "Zakon o državnim simbolima i Danu državnosti Crne Gore". Government of Montenegro (in Montenegrin). Podgorica.
