= Water polo at the 2020 Summer Olympics – Men's tournament =

Men's water polo at the Games of the XXXII Olympiad

Tournament details
- Host country: Japan
- City: Tokyo
- Venue(s): Tokyo Tatsumi International Swimming Center
- Dates: 25 July – 8 August 2021
- Teams: 12 (from 5 confederations)
- Competitors: 156

Final positions
- Champions: Serbia (5th title)
- Runners-up: Greece
- Third place: Hungary
- Fourth place: Spain

Tournament statistics
- Matches: 42
- Goals scored: 902 (21.48 per match)
- Total attendance: 0 (0 per match)
- Multiple medalists: 4-time medalist(s): 3 players 3-time medalist(s): 4 players
- Top scorer(s): (Montenegro) Aleksandar Ivović (23 goals in 8 matches)
- Most saves: (Serbia) Branislav Mitrović (70 saves in 6 matches) (Greece) Emmanouil Zerdevas (70 saves in 7 matches)
- Top sprinter(s): (United States) Johnny Hooper (22 sprints won in 8 matches)
- MVP: (Serbia) Filip Filipović

The men's tournament of water polo at the 2020 Summer Olympics at Tokyo, Japan began on 25 July and ended on 8 August 2021. It was held at the Tokyo Tatsumi International Swimming Center. It was the 27th official appearance of the tournament, which was not held in 1896 and was a demonstration sport in 1904 but otherwise had been held at every Olympics.

On 24 March 2020, the Olympics were postponed to 2021 due to the COVID-19 pandemic. Because of this pandemic, the games are played behind closed doors.

Serbia won their second consecutive gold medal after a finals win over Greece, while Hungary captured the bronze medal.

The medals for the competition were presented by Nenad Lalović, IOC Executive Board Member; Serbia and the medalists' bouquets were presented by Andrey Kryukov, Kazakhstan; FINA Bureau Member.

== Qualification ==
Event	Dates	Hosts	Quota	Qualifier(s)
Host nation	—N/a	—N/a	1	Japan
2019 FINA World League	18–23 June 2019	(Serbia) Belgrade	1	Serbia
2019 FINA World Championships	15–27 July 2019	(South Korea) Gwangju	2	Italy
2019 FINA World Championships	15–27 July 2019	(South Korea) Gwangju	2	Spain
2019 Pan American Games	4–10 August 2019	(Peru) Lima	1	United States
Oceanian Continental Selection	—N/a	—N/a	1	Australia
African Continental Selection	—N/a	—N/a	1	South Africa
2020 European Championships	14–26 January 2020	(Hungary) Budapest	1	Hungary
2018 Asian Games	25 August – 1 September 2018	(Indonesia) Jakarta	1	Kazakhstan
World Qualification Tournament	14–21 February 2021	(Netherlands) Rotterdam	3	Croatia
World Qualification Tournament	14–21 February 2021	(Netherlands) Rotterdam	3	Greece
World Qualification Tournament	14–21 February 2021	(Netherlands) Rotterdam	3	Montenegro
Total			12	

== Schedule ==
The competition began on 25 July, and matches were held every other day. At each match time, two matches were played simultaneously (one from each group during preliminary round, two quarterfinals during that round, one main semifinal and one classification 5 to 8 semifinal during the semifinal round, and the two classification games on the final day) except for the bronze and gold medal matches.

Legend
G	Group stage	¼	Quarter-finals	½	Semi-finals	B	Bronze medal match	F	Gold medal match

Sun 25	Mon 26	Tue 27	Wed 28	Thu 29	Fri 30	Sat 31	Sun 1	Mon 2	Tue 3	Wed 4	Thu 5	Fri 6	Sat 7	Sun 8	
G		G		G		G		G		¼		½		B	F

== Competition format ==
The twelve teams were seeded into two groups for a preliminary round. The teams in each group played a round-robin. The top four teams in each group advanced to the knockout round while the fifth- and sixth- placed teams were eliminated. The fifth placed teams were ranked ninth and tenth based on win–loss record, then goal average; the sixth-placed teams were ranked eleventh and twelfth in the same way. The knockout round began with quarterfinals and the winners advanced to the semifinals, while the quarterfinal losers played in the fifth- to eighth- place classification. The two semifinal winners played in the gold medal match, while the two semifinal losers played in the bronze medal match.

== Draw ==
The draw took place on 21 February 2021 in Rotterdam, The Netherlands.

=== Seeding ===
The twelve teams in the men's tournament were drawn into two groups of six teams. The teams were seeded into six pots.

Pot 1	Pot 2	Pot 3	Pot 4	Pot 5	Pot 6
Italy; Spain	Serbia; Hungary	United States; Australia	South Africa; Kazakhstan	Montenegro; Greece	Croatia; Japan (hosts)

=== Final draw ===
The hosts Japan was drawn into Group A, while the reigning Olympic champion Serbia was drawn into Group B.

	Group A	Group B
1	South Africa	Australia
2	United States	Croatia
3	Hungary	Serbia
4	Greece	Spain
5	Japan	Kazakhstan
6	Italy	Montenegro

== Referees ==
The following 28 referees were selected for the tournament.

24 referees:

- (Argentina) Germán Moller
- (Australia) Nicola Johnson
- (Canada) Marie-Claude Deslières
- (China) Zhang Liang
- (Croatia) Nenad Periš
- (France) Sébastien Dervieux
- (Germany) Frank Ohme
- (Greece) Georgios Stavridis
- (Hungary) György Kun
- (Italy) Alessandro Severo
- (Japan) Asumi Tsuzaki
- (Kazakhstan) Viktor Salnichenko
- (Montenegro) Stanko Ivanovski
- (Netherlands) Michiel Zwart
- (New Zealand) John Waldow
- (Romania) Adrian Alexandrescu
- (Russia) Arkadiy Voevodin
- (Serbia) Vojin Putniković
- (Singapore) Jeremy Cheng
- (South Africa) Dion Willis
- (Spain) Xevi Buch
- (Switzerland) Ursula Wengenroth
- (United States) Michael Goldenberg
- (Uruguay) Daniel Daners

4 video assistant referees:

- (Croatia) Mladen Rak
- (Kazakhstan) Alexandr Margolin
- (Kazakhstan) Alexandr Shershnev
- (Spain) Jaume Teixido

== Group stage ==
The schedule was announced on 9 March 2021.

All times are local (UTC+9).

=== Group A ===
Pos	Team	Pld	W	D	L	GF	GA	GD	Pts	Qualification
1	Greece	5	4	1	0	68	34	+34	9	Quarterfinals
2	Italy	5	3	2	0	60	32	+28	8	Quarterfinals
3	Hungary	5	3	1	1	64	35	+29	7	Quarterfinals
4	United States	5	2	0	3	59	53	+6	4	Quarterfinals
5	Japan (H)	5	1	0	4	65	66	−1	2	
6	South Africa	5	0	0	5	20	116	−96	0	

Source: Tokyo 2020 and FINA
Rules for classification: 1) Points; 2) Head-to-head points; 3) Head-to-head goal difference; 4) Head-to-head goals scored; 5) Goal difference.
(H) Hosts

25 July 2021; 10:00 v	Report	South Africa	2–21	Italy	Tokyo Tatsumi International Swimming Center; Referees: Viktor Salnichenko (KAZ), Stanko Ivanovski (MNE)
25 July 2021; 10:00 v	Report	Score by quarters: 0–2, 2–8, 0–7, 0–4			Tokyo Tatsumi International Swimming Center; Referees: Viktor Salnichenko (KAZ), Stanko Ivanovski (MNE)
25 July 2021; 10:00 v	Report	Rezelman, Stone 1	Goals	Di Fulvio 5	Tokyo Tatsumi International Swimming Center; Referees: Viktor Salnichenko (KAZ), Stanko Ivanovski (MNE)

25 July 2021; 11:30 v	Report	Hungary	9–10	Greece	Tokyo Tatsumi International Swimming Center; Referees: Michiel Zwart (NED), Vojin Putniković (SRB)
25 July 2021; 11:30 v	Report	Score by quarters: 3–2, 3–4, 2–3, 1–1			Tokyo Tatsumi International Swimming Center; Referees: Michiel Zwart (NED), Vojin Putniković (SRB)
25 July 2021; 11:30 v	Report	Erdélyi, Varga 3	Goals	Fountoulis 3	Tokyo Tatsumi International Swimming Center; Referees: Michiel Zwart (NED), Vojin Putniković (SRB)

25 July 2021; 14:00 v	Report	United States	15–13	Japan	Tokyo Tatsumi International Swimming Center; Referees: Sébastien Dervieux (FRA), Arkadiy Voevodin (RUS)
25 July 2021; 14:00 v	Report	Score by quarters: 3–3, 4–5, 4–2, 4–3			Tokyo Tatsumi International Swimming Center; Referees: Sébastien Dervieux (FRA), Arkadiy Voevodin (RUS)
25 July 2021; 14:00 v	Report	Bowen 5	Goals	three players 3	Tokyo Tatsumi International Swimming Center; Referees: Sébastien Dervieux (FRA), Arkadiy Voevodin (RUS)

27 July 2021; 10:00 v	Report	South Africa	3–20	United States	Tokyo Tatsumi International Swimming Center; Referees: Zhang Liang (CHN), Vojin Putniković (SRB)
27 July 2021; 10:00 v	Report	Score by quarters: 0–3, 1–9, 1–3, 1–5			Tokyo Tatsumi International Swimming Center; Referees: Zhang Liang (CHN), Vojin Putniković (SRB)
27 July 2021; 10:00 v	Report	three players 1	Goals	Hallock 4	Tokyo Tatsumi International Swimming Center; Referees: Zhang Liang (CHN), Vojin Putniković (SRB)

27 July 2021; 15:30 v	Report	Italy	6–6	Greece	Tokyo Tatsumi International Swimming Center; Referees: Xevi Buch (ESP), Stanko Ivanovski (MNE)
27 July 2021; 15:30 v	Report	Score by quarters: 1–1, 1–1, 0–4, 4–0			Tokyo Tatsumi International Swimming Center; Referees: Xevi Buch (ESP), Stanko Ivanovski (MNE)
27 July 2021; 15:30 v	Report	Aicardi, Figlioli 2	Goals	six players 1	Tokyo Tatsumi International Swimming Center; Referees: Xevi Buch (ESP), Stanko Ivanovski (MNE)

27 July 2021; 18:20 v	Report	Japan	11–16	Hungary	Tokyo Tatsumi International Swimming Center; Referees: Michiel Zwart (NED), Nenad Periš (CRO)
27 July 2021; 18:20 v	Report	Score by quarters: 3–4, 5–4, 2–5, 1–3			Tokyo Tatsumi International Swimming Center; Referees: Michiel Zwart (NED), Nenad Periš (CRO)
27 July 2021; 18:20 v	Report	Inaba, Okawa 3	Goals	Zalánki 4	Tokyo Tatsumi International Swimming Center; Referees: Michiel Zwart (NED), Nenad Periš (CRO)

29 July 2021; 10:00 v	Report	Hungary	23–1	South Africa	Tokyo Tatsumi International Swimming Center; Referees: Daniel Daners (URU), Germán Moller (ARG)
29 July 2021; 10:00 v	Report	Score by quarters: 4–0, 5–0, 8–0, 6–1			Tokyo Tatsumi International Swimming Center; Referees: Daniel Daners (URU), Germán Moller (ARG)
29 July 2021; 10:00 v	Report	Manhercz 5	Goals	Rodda 1	Tokyo Tatsumi International Swimming Center; Referees: Daniel Daners (URU), Germán Moller (ARG)

29 July 2021; 14:00 v	Report	United States	11–12	Italy	Tokyo Tatsumi International Swimming Center; Referees: Sébastien Dervieux (FRA), Nenad Periš (CRO)
29 July 2021; 14:00 v	Report	Score by quarters: 4–2, 3–3, 2–3, 2–4			Tokyo Tatsumi International Swimming Center; Referees: Sébastien Dervieux (FRA), Nenad Periš (CRO)
29 July 2021; 14:00 v	Report	four players 2	Goals	Di Fulvio 5	Tokyo Tatsumi International Swimming Center; Referees: Sébastien Dervieux (FRA), Nenad Periš (CRO)

29 July 2021; 18:20 v	Report	Greece	10–9	Japan	Tokyo Tatsumi International Swimming Center; Referees: Adrian Alexandrescu (ROU), Vojin Putniković (SRB)
29 July 2021; 18:20 v	Report	Score by quarters: 1–1, 4–4, 2–1, 3–3			Tokyo Tatsumi International Swimming Center; Referees: Adrian Alexandrescu (ROU), Vojin Putniković (SRB)
29 July 2021; 18:20 v	Report	Kapotsis, Genidounias 3	Goals	Adachi 3	Tokyo Tatsumi International Swimming Center; Referees: Adrian Alexandrescu (ROU), Vojin Putniković (SRB)

31 July 2021; 14:00 v	Report	United States	8–11	Hungary	Tokyo Tatsumi International Swimming Center; Referees: Xevi Buch (ESP), Arkadiy Voevodin (RUS)
31 July 2021; 14:00 v	Report	Score by quarters: 1–2, 3–3, 0–3, 4–3			Tokyo Tatsumi International Swimming Center; Referees: Xevi Buch (ESP), Arkadiy Voevodin (RUS)
31 July 2021; 14:00 v	Report	Bowen, Hallock 2	Goals	Manhercz 3	Tokyo Tatsumi International Swimming Center; Referees: Xevi Buch (ESP), Arkadiy Voevodin (RUS)

31 July 2021; 18:20 v	Report	Italy	16–8	Japan	Tokyo Tatsumi International Swimming Center; Referees: Stanko Ivanovski (MNE), Nenad Periš (CRO)
31 July 2021; 18:20 v	Report	Score by quarters: 5–0, 3–3, 3–1, 5–4			Tokyo Tatsumi International Swimming Center; Referees: Stanko Ivanovski (MNE), Nenad Periš (CRO)
31 July 2021; 18:20 v	Report	Bodagas, Figlioli 3	Goals	Inaba 3	Tokyo Tatsumi International Swimming Center; Referees: Stanko Ivanovski (MNE), Nenad Periš (CRO)

31 July 2021; 19:50 v	Report	South Africa	5–28	Greece	Tokyo Tatsumi International Swimming Center; Referees: John Waldow (NZL), Zhang Liang (CHN)
31 July 2021; 19:50 v	Report	Score by quarters: 1–7, 2–5, 1–7, 1–9			Tokyo Tatsumi International Swimming Center; Referees: John Waldow (NZL), Zhang Liang (CHN)
31 July 2021; 19:50 v	Report	Stone 2	Goals	Fountoulis 5	Tokyo Tatsumi International Swimming Center; Referees: John Waldow (NZL), Zhang Liang (CHN)

2 August 2021; 10:00 v	Report	Hungary	5–5	Italy	Tokyo Tatsumi International Swimming Center; Referees: Xevi Buch (ESP), Arkadiy Voevodin (RUS)
2 August 2021; 10:00 v	Report	Score by quarters: 2–1, 2–1, 1–1, 0–2			Tokyo Tatsumi International Swimming Center; Referees: Xevi Buch (ESP), Arkadiy Voevodin (RUS)
2 August 2021; 10:00 v	Report	Varga 3	Goals	Figlioli 2	Tokyo Tatsumi International Swimming Center; Referees: Xevi Buch (ESP), Arkadiy Voevodin (RUS)

2 August 2021; 11:30 v	Report	Greece	14–5	United States	Tokyo Tatsumi International Swimming Center; Referees: Adrian Alexandrescu (ROU), Michiel Zwart (NED)
2 August 2021; 11:30 v	Report	Score by quarters: 4–1, 2–2, 5–2, 3–0			Tokyo Tatsumi International Swimming Center; Referees: Adrian Alexandrescu (ROU), Michiel Zwart (NED)
2 August 2021; 11:30 v	Report	Genidounias 5	Goals	Obert 2	Tokyo Tatsumi International Swimming Center; Referees: Adrian Alexandrescu (ROU), Michiel Zwart (NED)

2 August 2021; 18:20 v	Report	Japan	24–9	South Africa	Tokyo Tatsumi International Swimming Center; Referees: John Waldow (NZL), Vojin Putniković (SRB)
2 August 2021; 18:20 v	Report	Score by quarters: 5–4, 7–4, 6–1, 6–0			Tokyo Tatsumi International Swimming Center; Referees: John Waldow (NZL), Vojin Putniković (SRB)
2 August 2021; 18:20 v	Report	Adachi, Arai 4	Goals	Neill 4	Tokyo Tatsumi International Swimming Center; Referees: John Waldow (NZL), Vojin Putniković (SRB)

=== Group B ===
Pos	Team	Pld	W	D	L	GF	GA	GD	Pts	Qualification
1	Spain	5	5	0	0	61	31	+30	10	Quarterfinals
2	Croatia	5	3	0	2	62	46	+16	6 (Note: Croatia 14–12 Serbia)	Quarterfinals
3	Serbia	5	3	0	2	70	46	+24	6	Quarterfinals
4	Montenegro	5	2	0	3	54	56	−2	4 (Note: Australia 10–15 Montenegro)	Quarterfinals
5	Australia	5	2	0	3	49	60	−11	4	
6	Kazakhstan	5	0	0	5	35	92	−57	0	

Source: Tokyo 2020 and FINA
Rules for classification: 1) Points; 2) Head-to-head points; 3) Head-to-head goal difference; 4) Head-to-head goals scored; 5) Goal difference.
Notes:

25 July 2021; 15:30 v	Report	Australia	10–15	Montenegro	Tokyo Tatsumi International Swimming Center; Referees: Adrian Alexandrescu (ROU), Alessandro Severo (ITA)
25 July 2021; 15:30 v	Report	Score by quarters: 5–4, 2–2, 1–4, 2–5			Tokyo Tatsumi International Swimming Center; Referees: Adrian Alexandrescu (ROU), Alessandro Severo (ITA)
25 July 2021; 15:30 v	Report	Campbell 3	Goals	Ukropina 4	Tokyo Tatsumi International Swimming Center; Referees: Adrian Alexandrescu (ROU), Alessandro Severo (ITA)

25 July 2021; 18:20 v	Report	Serbia	12–13	Spain	Tokyo Tatsumi International Swimming Center; Referees: Michael Goldenberg (USA), Georgios Stavridis (GRE)
25 July 2021; 18:20 v	Report	Score by quarters: 3–3, 3–5, 3–2, 3–3			Tokyo Tatsumi International Swimming Center; Referees: Michael Goldenberg (USA), Georgios Stavridis (GRE)
25 July 2021; 18:20 v	Report	four players 2	Goals	Munarriz 4	Tokyo Tatsumi International Swimming Center; Referees: Michael Goldenberg (USA), Georgios Stavridis (GRE)

25 July 2021; 19:50 v	Report	Croatia	23–7	Kazakhstan	Tokyo Tatsumi International Swimming Center; Referees: Dion Willis (RSA), Frank Ohme (GER)
25 July 2021; 19:50 v	Report	Score by quarters: 4–1, 6–3, 8–1, 5–2			Tokyo Tatsumi International Swimming Center; Referees: Dion Willis (RSA), Frank Ohme (GER)
25 July 2021; 19:50 v	Report	Joković 5	Goals	Vuksanović 3	Tokyo Tatsumi International Swimming Center; Referees: Dion Willis (RSA), Frank Ohme (GER)

27 July 2021; 11:30 v	Report	Montenegro	6–8	Spain	Tokyo Tatsumi International Swimming Center; Referees: Sébastien Dervieux (FRA), Georgios Stavridis (GRE)
27 July 2021; 11:30 v	Report	Score by quarters: 2–3, 1–2, 2–2, 1–1			Tokyo Tatsumi International Swimming Center; Referees: Sébastien Dervieux (FRA), Georgios Stavridis (GRE)
27 July 2021; 11:30 v	Report	Matković 3	Goals	three players 2	Tokyo Tatsumi International Swimming Center; Referees: Sébastien Dervieux (FRA), Georgios Stavridis (GRE)

27 July 2021; 14:00 v	Report	Kazakhstan	5–19	Serbia	Tokyo Tatsumi International Swimming Center; Referees: Adrian Alexandrescu (ROU), György Kun (HUN)
27 July 2021; 14:00 v	Report	Score by quarters: 2–4, 1–3, 2–6, 0–6			Tokyo Tatsumi International Swimming Center; Referees: Adrian Alexandrescu (ROU), György Kun (HUN)
27 July 2021; 14:00 v	Report	Medvedev, Vuksanović 2	Goals	Pijetlović 4	Tokyo Tatsumi International Swimming Center; Referees: Adrian Alexandrescu (ROU), György Kun (HUN)

27 July 2021; 19:50 v	Report	Australia	11–8	Croatia	Tokyo Tatsumi International Swimming Center; Referees: Frank Ohme (GER), Michael Goldenberg (USA)
27 July 2021; 19:50 v	Report	Score by quarters: 3–3, 2–0, 2–3, 4–2			Tokyo Tatsumi International Swimming Center; Referees: Frank Ohme (GER), Michael Goldenberg (USA)
27 July 2021; 19:50 v	Report	Campbell 3	Goals	Joković 3	Tokyo Tatsumi International Swimming Center; Referees: Frank Ohme (GER), Michael Goldenberg (USA)

29 July 2021; 11:30 v	Report	Spain	16–4	Kazakhstan	Tokyo Tatsumi International Swimming Center; Referees: Michael Goldenberg (USA), Dion Willis (RSA)
29 July 2021; 11:30 v	Report	Score by quarters: 3–0, 3–0, 5–2, 5–2			Tokyo Tatsumi International Swimming Center; Referees: Michael Goldenberg (USA), Dion Willis (RSA)
29 July 2021; 11:30 v	Report	Granados 5	Goals	Vuksanović 2	Tokyo Tatsumi International Swimming Center; Referees: Michael Goldenberg (USA), Dion Willis (RSA)

29 July 2021; 15:30 v	Report	Croatia	13–8	Montenegro	Tokyo Tatsumi International Swimming Center; Referees: Arkadiy Voevodin (RUS), György Kun (HUN)
29 July 2021; 15:30 v	Report	Score by quarters: 1–1, 6–4, 4–3, 2–0			Tokyo Tatsumi International Swimming Center; Referees: Arkadiy Voevodin (RUS), György Kun (HUN)
29 July 2021; 15:30 v	Report	Fatović 3	Goals	three players 2	Tokyo Tatsumi International Swimming Center; Referees: Arkadiy Voevodin (RUS), György Kun (HUN)

29 July 2021; 19:50 v	Report	Serbia	14–8	Australia	Tokyo Tatsumi International Swimming Center; Referees: Frank Ohme (GER), Georgios Stavridis (GRE)
29 July 2021; 19:50 v	Report	Score by quarters: 6–0, 4–1, 1–2, 3–5			Tokyo Tatsumi International Swimming Center; Referees: Frank Ohme (GER), Georgios Stavridis (GRE)
29 July 2021; 19:50 v	Report	Mandić 4	Goals	B. Edwards 2	Tokyo Tatsumi International Swimming Center; Referees: Frank Ohme (GER), Georgios Stavridis (GRE)

31 July 2021; 10:00 v	Report	Montenegro	19–12	Kazakhstan	Tokyo Tatsumi International Swimming Center; Referees: Frank Ohme (GER), Georgios Stavridis (GRE)
31 July 2021; 10:00 v	Report	Score by quarters: 5–3, 6–3, 3–3, 5–3			Tokyo Tatsumi International Swimming Center; Referees: Frank Ohme (GER), Georgios Stavridis (GRE)
31 July 2021; 10:00 v	Report	three players 4	Goals	Ruday 3	Tokyo Tatsumi International Swimming Center; Referees: Frank Ohme (GER), Georgios Stavridis (GRE)

31 July 2021; 11:30 v	Report	Australia	5–16	Spain	Tokyo Tatsumi International Swimming Center; Referees: Adrian Alexandrescu (ROU), Sébastien Dervieux (FRA)
31 July 2021; 11:30 v	Report	Score by quarters: 2–4, 1–4, 2–5, 0–3			Tokyo Tatsumi International Swimming Center; Referees: Adrian Alexandrescu (ROU), Sébastien Dervieux (FRA)
31 July 2021; 11:30 v	Report	Edwards, Younger 2	Goals	Granados 4	Tokyo Tatsumi International Swimming Center; Referees: Adrian Alexandrescu (ROU), Sébastien Dervieux (FRA)

31 July 2021; 15:30 v	Report	Croatia	14–12	Serbia	Tokyo Tatsumi International Swimming Center; Referees: Michael Goldenberg (USA), Michiel Zwart (NED)
31 July 2021; 15:30 v	Report	Score by quarters: 5–3, 1–1, 4–4, 4–4			Tokyo Tatsumi International Swimming Center; Referees: Michael Goldenberg (USA), Michiel Zwart (NED)
31 July 2021; 15:30 v	Report	Joković, Obradović 4	Goals	Jakšić 3	Tokyo Tatsumi International Swimming Center; Referees: Michael Goldenberg (USA), Michiel Zwart (NED)

2 August 2021; 14:00 v	Report	Serbia	13–6	Montenegro	Tokyo Tatsumi International Swimming Center; Referees: Alessandro Severo (ITA), Frank Ohme (GER)
2 August 2021; 14:00 v	Report	Score by quarters: 6–1, 2–1, 3–2, 2–2			Tokyo Tatsumi International Swimming Center; Referees: Alessandro Severo (ITA), Frank Ohme (GER)
2 August 2021; 14:00 v	Report	Filipović 3	Goals	Ivović 3	Tokyo Tatsumi International Swimming Center; Referees: Alessandro Severo (ITA), Frank Ohme (GER)

2 August 2021; 15:30 v	Report	Spain	8–4	Croatia	Tokyo Tatsumi International Swimming Center; Referees: Georgios Stavridis (GRE), György Kun (HUN)
2 August 2021; 15:30 v	Report	Score by quarters: 2–1, 1–0, 4–2, 1–1			Tokyo Tatsumi International Swimming Center; Referees: Georgios Stavridis (GRE), György Kun (HUN)
2 August 2021; 15:30 v	Report	Granados 2	Goals	Bukić 2	Tokyo Tatsumi International Swimming Center; Referees: Georgios Stavridis (GRE), György Kun (HUN)

2 August 2021; 19:50 v	Report	Australia	15–7	Kazakhstan	Tokyo Tatsumi International Swimming Center; Referees: Germán Moller (ARG), Michael Goldenberg (USA)
2 August 2021; 19:50 v	Report	Score by quarters: 4–1, 3–0, 5–2, 3–4			Tokyo Tatsumi International Swimming Center; Referees: Germán Moller (ARG), Michael Goldenberg (USA)
2 August 2021; 19:50 v	Report	Howden 5	Goals	Shakenov, Ukumanov 2	Tokyo Tatsumi International Swimming Center; Referees: Germán Moller (ARG), Michael Goldenberg (USA)

== Knockout stage ==
=== Bracket ===
Quarter-finals
4 August
Greece	10
Montenegro	4
4 August
Croatia	11
Hungary	15
4 August
Italy	6
Serbia	10
4 August
Spain	12
United States	8

Semi-finals
6 August
Greece	9
Hungary	6
6 August
Serbia	10
Spain	9

Gold medal
8 August
Greece	10
Serbia	13
Bronze medal
8 August
Hungary	9
Spain	5

Fifth place bracket

5–8th place semifinals
6 August
Montenegro	10
Croatia	12
6 August
Italy	6
United States	7

Fifth place
8 August
Croatia	14
United States	11
Seventh place
8 August
Montenegro	14 (3)
Italy (pen.)	14 (4)

=== Quarterfinals ===
4 August 2021; 14:00 v	Report	United States	8–12	Spain	Tokyo Tatsumi International Swimming Center; Referees: Michiel Zwart (NED), György Kun (HUN)
4 August 2021; 14:00 v	Report	Score by quarters: 3–3, 3–3, 0–1, 2–5			Tokyo Tatsumi International Swimming Center; Referees: Michiel Zwart (NED), György Kun (HUN)
4 August 2021; 14:00 v	Report	Daube 3	Goals	four players 2	Tokyo Tatsumi International Swimming Center; Referees: Michiel Zwart (NED), György Kun (HUN)

4 August 2021; 15:30 v	Report	Greece	10–4	Montenegro	Tokyo Tatsumi International Swimming Center; Referees: Adrian Alexandrescu (ROU), Alessandro Severo (ITA)
4 August 2021; 15:30 v	Report	Score by quarters: 1–0, 2–1, 3–1, 4–2			Tokyo Tatsumi International Swimming Center; Referees: Adrian Alexandrescu (ROU), Alessandro Severo (ITA)
4 August 2021; 15:30 v	Report	Genidounias 5	Goals	Ivović 2	Tokyo Tatsumi International Swimming Center; Referees: Adrian Alexandrescu (ROU), Alessandro Severo (ITA)

4 August 2021; 18:20 v	Report	Italy	6–10	Serbia	Tokyo Tatsumi International Swimming Center; Referees: Arkadiy Voevodin (RUS), Georgios Stavridis (GRE)
4 August 2021; 18:20 v	Report	Score by quarters: 2–5, 1–4, 1–0, 2–1			Tokyo Tatsumi International Swimming Center; Referees: Arkadiy Voevodin (RUS), Georgios Stavridis (GRE)
4 August 2021; 18:20 v	Report	Presciutti 2	Goals	Filipović 3	Tokyo Tatsumi International Swimming Center; Referees: Arkadiy Voevodin (RUS), Georgios Stavridis (GRE)

4 August 2021; 19:50 v	Report	Hungary	15–11	Croatia	Tokyo Tatsumi International Swimming Center; Referees: Sébastien Dervieux (FRA), Frank Ohme (GER)
4 August 2021; 19:50 v	Report	Score by quarters: 2–3, 5–2, 4–3, 4–3			Tokyo Tatsumi International Swimming Center; Referees: Sébastien Dervieux (FRA), Frank Ohme (GER)
4 August 2021; 19:50 v	Report	Manhercz 7	Goals	Bukić 4	Tokyo Tatsumi International Swimming Center; Referees: Sébastien Dervieux (FRA), Frank Ohme (GER)

=== 5–8th place semifinals ===
6 August 2021; 14:00 v	Report	Montenegro	10–12	Croatia	Tokyo Tatsumi International Swimming Center; Referees: Viktor Salnichenko (KAZ), György Kun (HUN)
6 August 2021; 14:00 v	Report	Score by quarters: 0–1, 4–5, 3–3, 3–3			Tokyo Tatsumi International Swimming Center; Referees: Viktor Salnichenko (KAZ), György Kun (HUN)
6 August 2021; 14:00 v	Report	Ivović 3	Goals	Vukičević 3	Tokyo Tatsumi International Swimming Center; Referees: Viktor Salnichenko (KAZ), György Kun (HUN)

6 August 2021; 18:20 v	Report	Italy	6–7	United States	Tokyo Tatsumi International Swimming Center; Referees: Sébastien Dervieux (FRA), Xevi Buch (ESP)
6 August 2021; 18:20 v	Report	Score by quarters: 2–2, 1–3, 2–0, 1–2			Tokyo Tatsumi International Swimming Center; Referees: Sébastien Dervieux (FRA), Xevi Buch (ESP)
6 August 2021; 18:20 v	Report	Figlioli, Renzuto 2	Goals	Bowen 3	Tokyo Tatsumi International Swimming Center; Referees: Sébastien Dervieux (FRA), Xevi Buch (ESP)

=== Semifinals ===
6 August 2021; 15:30 v	Report	Greece	9–6	Hungary	Tokyo Tatsumi International Swimming Center; Referees: Michael Goldenberg (USA), Arkadiy Voevodin (RUS)
6 August 2021; 15:30 v	Report	Score by quarters: 2–1, 1–1, 2–2, 4–2			Tokyo Tatsumi International Swimming Center; Referees: Michael Goldenberg (USA), Arkadiy Voevodin (RUS)
6 August 2021; 15:30 v	Report	Argyropoulos 4	Goals	Manhercz 2	Tokyo Tatsumi International Swimming Center; Referees: Michael Goldenberg (USA), Arkadiy Voevodin (RUS)

6 August 2021; 19:50 v	Report	Serbia	10–9	Spain	Tokyo Tatsumi International Swimming Center; Referees: Adrian Alexandrescu (ROU), Michiel Zwart (NED)
6 August 2021; 19:50 v	Report	Score by quarters: 2–0, 2–5, 1–2, 5–2			Tokyo Tatsumi International Swimming Center; Referees: Adrian Alexandrescu (ROU), Michiel Zwart (NED)
6 August 2021; 19:50 v	Report	Mandić 3	Goals	three players 2	Tokyo Tatsumi International Swimming Center; Referees: Adrian Alexandrescu (ROU), Michiel Zwart (NED)

=== Seventh place game ===
8 August 2021; 09:30 v	Report	Montenegro	14–14; PSO: 3–4	Italy	Tokyo Tatsumi International Swimming Center; Referees: Viktor Salnichenko (KAZ), Sébastien Dervieux (FRA)
8 August 2021; 09:30 v	Report	Score by quarters: 2–3, 5–4, 4–5, 3–2			Tokyo Tatsumi International Swimming Center; Referees: Viktor Salnichenko (KAZ), Sébastien Dervieux (FRA)
8 August 2021; 09:30 v	Report	Ivović 6	Goals	Velotto 5	Tokyo Tatsumi International Swimming Center; Referees: Viktor Salnichenko (KAZ), Sébastien Dervieux (FRA)

=== Fifth place game ===
8 August 2021; 11:00 v	Report	Croatia	14–11	United States	Tokyo Tatsumi International Swimming Center; Referees: Alessandro Severo (ITA), György Kun (HUN)
8 August 2021; 11:00 v	Report	Score by quarters: 2–3, 4–2, 4–2, 4–4			Tokyo Tatsumi International Swimming Center; Referees: Alessandro Severo (ITA), György Kun (HUN)
8 August 2021; 11:00 v	Report	Bukić 3	Goals	five players 2	Tokyo Tatsumi International Swimming Center; Referees: Alessandro Severo (ITA), György Kun (HUN)

=== Bronze medal game ===
8 August 2021; 13:40 v	Report	Hungary	9–5	Spain	Tokyo Tatsumi International Swimming Center; Referees: Arkadiy Voevodin (RUS), Georgios Stavridis (GRE)
8 August 2021; 13:40 v	Report	Score by quarters: 3–3, 2–2, 1–0, 3–0			Tokyo Tatsumi International Swimming Center; Referees: Arkadiy Voevodin (RUS), Georgios Stavridis (GRE)
8 August 2021; 13:40 v	Report	Vámos 2	Goals	Munárriz 2	Tokyo Tatsumi International Swimming Center; Referees: Arkadiy Voevodin (RUS), Georgios Stavridis (GRE)

=== Gold medal game ===
8 August 2021; 16:30 v	Report	Greece	10–13	Serbia	Tokyo Tatsumi International Swimming Center; Referees: Michael Goldenberg (USA), Xevi Buch (ESP)
8 August 2021; 16:30 v	Report	Score by quarters: 3–6, 4–2, 2–2, 1–3			Tokyo Tatsumi International Swimming Center; Referees: Michael Goldenberg (USA), Xevi Buch (ESP)
8 August 2021; 16:30 v	Report	three players 2	Goals	three players 3	Tokyo Tatsumi International Swimming Center; Referees: Michael Goldenberg (USA), Xevi Buch (ESP)

== Final ranking ==
Rank	Team
Gold medal	Serbia
Silver medal	Greece
Bronze medal	Hungary
4	Spain
5	Croatia
6	United States
7	Italy
8	Montenegro
9	Australia
10	Japan
11	Kazakhstan
12	South Africa

2020 Men's Olympic champions

Serbia
Fifth title

== Medalists ==
Gold	Silver	Bronze
Serbia Gojko Pijetlović (GK); Dušan Mandić (LH); Nikola Dedović; Sava Ranđelović; Strahinja Rašović; Duško Pijetlović; Đorđe Lazić; Milan Aleksić; Nikola Jakšić; Filip Filipović (C, LH); Andrija Prlainović; Stefan Mitrović; Branislav Mitrović (GK) Head coach: Dejan Savić	Greece Emmanouil Zerdevas (GK); Konstantinos Genidounias; Dimitrios Skoumpakis; Marios Kapotsis; Ioannis Fountoulis (C); Alexandros Papanastasiou; Georgios Dervisis; Stylianos Argyropoulos; Konstantinos Mourikis; Christodoulos Kolomvos; Konstantinos Gkiouvetsis; Angelos Vlachopoulos; Konstantinos Galanidis (GK) Head coach: Thodoris Vlachos	Hungary Viktor Nagy (GK); Dániel Angyal; Krisztián Manhercz; Gergő Zalánki (LH); Márton Vámos (LH); Norbert Hosnyánszky; Mátyás Pásztor; Szilárd Jansik; Balázs Erdélyi; Dénes Varga (C); Tamás Mezei (LH); Balázs Hárai; Soma Vogel (GK) Head coach: Tamás Märcz

== Team statistics ==
=== Goals for ===
Rank	Team	Goals for	Matches played	Goals for per match	Shots	%	Finish
1	Japan	65	5	13.000	170	38.2%	10th
2	Serbia	103	8	12.875	237	43.5%	1st
3	Croatia	99	8	12.375	245	40.4%	5th
4	Greece	97	8	12.125	247	39.3%	2nd
5	Hungary	94	8	11.750	247	38.1%	3rd
6	Spain	87	8	10.875	238	36.6%	4th
7	Italy	86	8	10.750	242	35.5%	7th
8	United States	85	8	10.625	244	34.8%	6th
9	Montenegro	82	8	10.250	247	33.2%	8th
10	Australia	49	5	9.800	149	32.9%	9th
11	Kazakhstan	35	5	7.000	133	26.3%	11th
12	South Africa	20	5	4.000	111	18.0%	12th
Total		902	42	10.738	2510	35.9%	

Source: Official Results Book (page 99)

=== Goals against ===
Rank	Team	Goals against	Matches played	Goals against per match	Shots	%	Finish
1	Greece	57	8	7.125	230	24.8%	2nd
2	Spain	58	8	7.250	223	26.0%	4th
3	Hungary	60	8	7.500	237	25.3%	3rd
4	Italy	63	8	7.875	226	27.9%	7th
5	Serbia	71	8	8.875	243	29.2%	1st
6	Croatia	82	8	10.250	245	33.5%	5th
7	United States	85	8	10.625	240	35.4%	6th
8	Montenegro	92	8	11.500	227	40.5%	8th
9	Australia	60	5	12.000	136	44.1%	9th
10	Japan	66	5	13.200	147	44.9%	10th
11	Kazakhstan	92	5	18.400	161	57.1%	11th
12	South Africa	116	5	23.200	195	59.5%	12th
Total		902	42	10.738	2510	35.9%	

Source: Official Results Book (pages 113, 117, 121, 125, 129, 133, 136, 139, 143, 146, 150, 154)

=== Goal difference ===
Rank	Team	Goals for	Goals against	Goal diff.	Matches played	Goals diff. per match	Finish
1	Greece	97	57	40	8	5.000	2nd
2	Hungary	94	60	34	8	4.250	3rd
3	Serbia	103	71	32	8	4.000	1st
4	Spain	87	58	29	8	3.625	4th
5	Italy	86	63	23	8	2.875	7th
6	Croatia	99	82	17	8	2.125	5th
7	United States	85	85	0	8	0.000	6th
8	Japan	65	66	−1	5	−0.200	10th
9	Montenegro	82	92	−10	8	−1.250	8th
10	Australia	49	60	−11	5	−2.200	9th
11	Kazakhstan	35	92	−57	5	−11.400	11th
12	South Africa	20	116	−96	5	−19.200	12th
Total		902	902	0	42	0.000	

Source: Official Results Book (pages 113, 117, 121, 125, 129, 133, 136, 139, 143, 146, 150, 154)

=== Saves ===
Rank	Team	Saves	Matches played	Saves per match	Shots	%	Finish
1	Serbia	89	8	11.125	160	55.6%	1st
2	Croatia	88	8	11.000	170	51.8%	5th
3	Spain	87	8	10.875	145	60.0%	4th
4	United States	83	8	10.375	168	49.4%	6th
5	Greece	79	8	9.875	136	58.1%	2nd
5	Italy	79	8	9.875	142	55.6%	7th
7	Hungary	72	8	9.000	132	54.5%	3rd
8	Montenegro	70	8	8.750	162	43.2%	8th
9	Japan	43	5	8.600	109	39.4%	10th
10	Australia	41	5	8.200	101	40.6%	9th
11	South Africa	30	5	6.000	146	20.5%	12th
12	Kazakhstan	28	5	5.600	120	23.3%	11th
Total		789	42	9.393	1691	46.7%	

Source: Official Results Book (pages 113, 117, 121, 125, 129, 133, 136, 139, 143, 146, 150, 154)

=== Blocks ===
Rank	Team	Blocks	Matches played	Blocks per match	Finish
1	Greece	46	8	5.750	2nd
1	Hungary	46	8	5.750	3rd
3	Serbia	45	8	5.625	1st
4	United States	36	8	4.500	6th
5	Italy	31	8	3.875	7th
6	Croatia	28	8	3.500	5th
7	Spain	26	8	3.250	4th
8	South Africa	16	5	3.200	12th
9	Montenegro	25	8	3.125	8th
10	Kazakhstan	12	5	2.400	11th
11	Japan	10	5	2.000	10th
12	Australia	7	5	1.400	9th
Total		328	42	3.905	

Source: Official Results Book (page 99)

=== Rebounds ===
Rank	Team	Rebounds	Matches played	Rebounds per match	Finish
1	Hungary	59	8	7.375	3rd
1	Spain	59	8	7.375	4th
3	Greece	53	8	6.625	2nd
4	Australia	31	5	6.200	9th
5	Serbia	48	8	6.000	1st
5	United States	48	8	6.000	6th
7	Croatia	44	8	5.500	5th
7	Italy	44	8	5.500	7th
9	Montenegro	40	8	5.000	8th
10	Japan	24	5	4.800	10th
11	Kazakhstan	22	5	4.400	11th
12	South Africa	19	5	3.800	12th
Total		491	42	5.845	

Source: Official Results Book (page 99)

=== Steals ===
Rank	Team	Steals	Matches played	Steals per match	Finish
1	Japan	44	5	8.800	10th
2	Italy	65	8	8.125	7th
3	Montenegro	64	8	8.000	8th
4	Spain	49	8	6.125	4th
5	Hungary	48	8	6.000	3rd
6	Serbia	47	8	5.875	1st
7	Croatia	46	8	5.750	5th
8	Greece	45	8	5.625	2nd
9	Australia	28	5	5.600	9th
9	Kazakhstan	28	5	5.600	11th
11	United States	44	8	5.500	6th
12	South Africa	15	5	3.000	12th
Total		523	42	6.226	

Source: Official Results Book (page 99)

=== Sprints won ===
Rank	Team	Sprints won	Matches played	Sprints won per match	Sprints contested	%	Finish
1	Italy	25	8	3.125	32	78.1%	7th
2	Spain	24	8	3.000	32	75.0%	4th
3	Australia	14	5	2.800	20	70.0%	9th
4	United States	22	8	2.750	32	68.8%	6th
5	Croatia	19	8	2.375	32	59.4%	5th
6	Hungary	17	8	2.125	32	53.1%	3rd
7	Greece	13	8	1.625	32	40.6%	2nd
8	Serbia	11	8	1.375	32	34.4%	1st
9	Montenegro	10	8	1.250	32	31.3%	8th
10	Japan	5	5	1.000	20	25.0%	10th
11	Kazakhstan	4	5	0.800	20	20.0%	11th
11	South Africa	4	5	0.800	20	20.0%	12th
Total		168	42	2.000	336	50.0%	

Source: Official Results Book (page 99)

=== Turnovers ===
Rank	Team	Turnovers	Matches played	Turnovers per match	Finish
1	Japan	14	5	2.800	10th
2	Spain	30	8	3.750	4th
3	Croatia	31	8	3.875	5th
4	Australia	21	5	4.200	9th
5	Greece	37	8	4.625	2nd
6	Montenegro	38	8	4.750	8th
7	Kazakhstan	24	5	4.800	11th
8	Serbia	40	8	5.000	1st
9	Hungary	41	8	5.125	3rd
10	Italy	46	8	5.750	7th
11	United States	48	8	6.000	6th
12	South Africa	44	5	8.800	12th
Total		414	42	4.929	

Source: Official Results Book (page 99)

=== Exclusions with substitution ===
Rank	Team	Exclusions with substitution	Matches played	Exclusions w/subst per match	Finish
1	Italy	4	8	0.500	7th
1	Montenegro	4	8	0.500	8th
3	Japan	3	5	0.600	10th
4	Kazakhstan	5	5	1.000	11th
4	Spain	8	8	1.000	4th
6	Australia	6	5	1.200	9th
7	United States	10	8	1.250	6th
8	Serbia	11	8	1.375	1st
9	Croatia	12	8	1.500	5th
10	Hungary	13	8	1.625	3rd
11	South Africa	9	5	1.800	12th
12	Greece	16	8	2.000	2nd
Total		101	42	1.202	

Source: Official Results Book (page 99)

== Player statistics ==
=== Multiple medalists ===
Four-time Olympic medalist(s): 3 players

- Serbia: Filip Filipović, Duško Pijetlović, Andrija Prlainović

Three-time Olympic medalist(s): 4 players

- Serbia: Milan Aleksić, Dušan Mandić, Stefan Mitrović, Gojko Pijetlović (GK)

=== Leading goalscorers ===
Rank	Player	Team	Goals	Matches played	Goals per match	Shots	%
1	Aleksandar Ivović	Montenegro	23	8	2.875	43	53.5%
2	Luka Bukić	Croatia	20	8	2.500	41	48.8%
2	Krisztián Manhercz	Hungary	20	8	2.500	44	45.5%
4	Alex Bowen	United States	18	8	2.250	44	40.9%
4	Álvaro Granados	Spain	18	8	2.250	52	34.6%
6	Francesco Di Fulvio	Italy	17	8	2.125	55	30.9%
6	Konstantinos Genidounias	Greece	17	8	2.125	54	31.5%
6	Dušan Mandić	Serbia	17	8	2.125	36	47.2%
9	Filip Filipović	Serbia	16	8	2.000	27	59.3%
9	Ioannis Fountoulis	Greece	16	8	2.000	42	38.1%
9	Maro Joković	Croatia	16	8	2.000	37	43.2%

Source: Official Results Book (page 109)

=== Saves leaders ===
Rank	Goalkeeper	Team	Saves	Matches played	Saves per match	Shots	%
1	Branislav Mitrović	Serbia	70	6	11.667	122	57.4%
1	Emmanouil Zerdevas	Greece	70	7	10.000	122	57.4%
3	Marco Del Lungo	Italy	61	7	8.714	110	55.5%
4	Daniel López	Spain	60	6	10.000	109	55.0%
5	Marko Bijač	Croatia	56	6	9.333	116	48.3%
5	Viktor Nagy	Hungary	56	7	8.000	103	54.4%
7	Drew Holland	United States	52	5	10.400	111	46.8%
8	Slaven Kandić	Montenegro	41	5	8.200	92	44.6%
9	Katsuyuki Tanamura	Japan	36	4	9.000	93	38.7%
10	Ivan Marcelić	Croatia	32	3	10.667	54	59.3%

Source: Official Results Book (page 111)

=== Leading blockers ===
Rank	Player	Team	Blocks	Matches played	Blocks per match
1	Filip Filipović	Serbia	10	8	1.250
1	Krisztián Manhercz	Hungary	10	8	1.250
3	Draško Brguljan	Montenegro	7	8	0.875
3	Francesco Di Fulvio	Italy	7	8	0.875
3	Gergő Zalánki	Hungary	7	8	0.875
6	Luca Cupido	United States	6	8	0.750
6	Georgios Dervisis	Greece	6	8	0.750
6	Gonzalo Echenique	Italy	6	8	0.750
6	Ioannis Fountoulis	Greece	6	8	0.750
6	Konstantinos Genidounias	Greece	6	8	0.750
6	Balázs Hárai	Hungary	6	8	0.750
6	Maro Joković	Croatia	6	8	0.750
6	Marios Kapotsis	Greece	6	8	0.750
6	Đorđe Lazić	Serbia	6	8	0.750
6	Ross Stone	South Africa	6	5	1.200
6	Marko Vavic	United States	6	8	0.750
6	Angelos Vlachopoulos	Greece	6	8	0.750

Source: Official Results Book (pages 113, 117, 121, 125, 129, 133, 136, 139, 143, 146, 150, 154)

=== Leading rebounders ===
Rank	Player	Team	Rebounds	Matches played	Rebounds per match
1	Álvaro Granados	Spain	12	8	1.500
1	Angelos Vlachopoulos	Greece	12	8	1.500
3	Alberto Munárriz	Spain	11	8	1.375
4	Filip Filipović	Serbia	10	8	1.250
5	Draško Brguljan	Montenegro	9	8	1.125
5	Ioannis Fountoulis	Greece	9	8	1.125
7	Gonzalo Echenique	Italy	8	8	1.000
7	Loren Fatović	Croatia	8	8	1.000
7	Konstantinos Genidounias	Greece	8	8	1.000
7	Aleksandar Ivović	Montenegro	8	8	1.000
7	Krisztián Manhercz	Hungary	8	8	1.000
7	Nicholas Presciutti	Italy	8	8	1.000
7	Aleksa Ukropina	Montenegro	8	8	1.000
7	Dénes Varga	Hungary	8	7	1.143

Source: Official Results Book (pages 113, 117, 121, 125, 129, 133, 136, 139, 143, 146, 150, 154)

=== Steals leaders ===
Rank	Player	Team	Steals	Matches played	Steals per match
1	Alessandro Velotto	Italy	13	8	1.625
2	Álvaro Granados	Spain	11	8	1.375
3	Draško Brguljan	Montenegro	10	8	1.250
3	Drew Holland (GK)	United States	10	5	2.000
3	Aleksandar Ivović	Montenegro	10	8	1.250
3	Katsuyuki Tanamura (GK)	Japan	10	5	2.000
7	Vlado Popadić	Montenegro	9	8	1.125
7	Nicholas Presciutti	Italy	9	8	1.125
9	Balázs Erdélyi	Hungary	8	8	1.000
9	Anthony Hrysanthos (GK)	Australia	8	3	2.667
9	Dušan Marković	Kazakhstan	8	5	1.600

Source: Official Results Book (pages 113, 117, 121, 125, 129, 133, 136, 139, 143, 146, 150, 154)

=== Leading sprinters ===
Rank	Sprinter	Team	Sprints won	Matches played	Sprints won per match	Sprints contested	%
1	Johnny Hooper	United States	22	8	2.750	29	75.9%
2	Martin Famera	Spain	17	8	2.125	19	89.5%
3	Rhys Howden	Australia	14	5	2.800	19	73.7%
4	Luka Bukić	Croatia	13	8	1.625	18	72.2%
4	Francesco Di Fulvio	Italy	13	8	1.625	18	72.2%
6	Alexandros Papanastasiou	Greece	11	8	1.375	17	64.7%
7	Strahinja Rašović	Serbia	8	8	1.000	19	42.1%
8	Draško Brguljan	Montenegro	7	8	0.875	20	35.0%
8	Pietro Figlioli	Italy	7	7	1.000	8	87.5%
10	Krisztián Manhercz	Hungary	6	8	0.750	11	54.5%
10	Lovre Miloš	Croatia	6	8	0.750	14	42.9%

Source: Official Results Book (page 108)

=== Turnovers leaders ===
Rank	Player	Team	Turnovers	Matches played	Turnovers per match
1	Michaël Bodegas	Italy	15	8	1.875
2	Ben Hallock	United States	14	8	1.750
3	Balázs Hárai	Hungary	11	8	1.375
4	Luka Lončar	Croatia	10	8	1.250
4	Duško Pijetlović	Serbia	10	8	1.250
6	Tamás Mezei	Hungary	9	7	1.286
7	Francesco Di Fulvio	Italy	8	8	1.000
7	Konstantinos Mourikis	Greece	8	8	1.000
9	Devon Card	South Africa	7	5	1.400
9	Miguel de Toro	Spain	7	8	0.875
9	Đorđe Lazić	Serbia	7	8	0.875
9	Miroslav Perković	Montenegro	7	8	0.875

Source: Official Results Book (pages 113, 117, 121, 125, 129, 133, 136, 139, 143, 146, 150, 154)

=== Exclusions leaders ===
Rank	Player	Team	Exclusions with substitution	Matches played	Exclusions w/subst per match
1	Marko Macan	Croatia	6	8	0.750
2	Dimitrios Skoumpakis	Greece	4	8	0.500
3	Georgios Dervisis	Greece	3	8	0.375
3	Norbert Hosnyánszky	Hungary	3	8	0.375
3	Cameron Laurenson	South Africa	3	5	0.600
3	Sava Ranđelović	Serbia	3	8	0.375
3	Dylan Woodhead	United States	3	8	0.375
8	Milan Aleksić	Serbia	2	8	0.250
8	Stylianos Argyropoulos	Greece	2	8	0.250
8	Andro Bušlje	Croatia	2	8	0.250
8	Alejandro Bustos	Spain	2	8	0.250
8	Lachlan Edwards	Australia	2	5	0.400
8	Balázs Erdélyi	Hungary	2	8	0.250
8	Martin Famera	Spain	2	8	0.250
8	George Ford	Australia	2	5	0.400
8	Ioannis Fountoulis	Greece	2	8	0.250
8	Balázs Hárai	Hungary	2	8	0.250
8	Szilárd Jansik	Hungary	2	8	0.250
8	Stefan Mitrović	Serbia	2	8	0.250
8	Alexandros Papanastasiou	Greece	2	8	0.250
8	Jesse Smith	United States	2	7	0.286
8	Angelos Vlachopoulos	Greece	2	8	0.250

Source: Official Results Book (pages 113, 117, 121, 125, 129, 133, 136, 139, 143, 146, 150, 154)

== Awards ==
The all-star team was announced on 8 August 2021.

Position	Player
Goalkeeper	(Serbia) Branislav Mitrović
Field players	(Spain) Roger Tahull (Centre forward)
Field players	(Greece) Stylianos Argyropoulos
Field players	(Serbia) Filip Filipović
Field players	(Japan) Yusuke Inaba
Field players	(Montenegro) Aleksandar Ivović
Field players	(Hungary) Krisztián Manhercz
MVP	(Serbia) Filip Filipović

== Sources ==
=== Overall ===
- Water Polo – Olympic Schedule & Results | Tokyo 2020 Olympics
- Water Polo – Olympic Reports | Tokyo 2020 Olympics
- Water Polo – Official Results Book | Tokyo 2020 Olympics (archive)
- Water Polo – Tournament Summary | Tokyo 2020 Olympics
- Water Polo – Competition Officials | Tokyo 2020 Olympics

=== Tournament details ===
- Water Polo – Competition Schedule | Tokyo 2020 Olympics

Group A
25 July 2021				27 July 2021			
Match 01: RSA v ITA	Start List	Play by Play	Results	Match 10: ITA v GRE	Start List	Play by Play	Results
Match 02: HUN v GRE	Start List	Play by Play	Results	Match 11: JPN v HUN	Start List	Play by Play	Results
Match 03: USA v JPN	Start List	Play by Play	Results	Match 12: RSA v USA	Start List	Play by Play	Results
29 July 2021				31 July 2021			
Match 13: GRE v JPN	Start List	Play by Play	Results	Match 22: ITA v JPN	Start List	Play by Play	Results
Match 14: USA v ITA	Start List	Play by Play	Results	Match 23: RSA v GRE	Start List	Play by Play	Results
Match 15: HUN v RSA	Start List	Play by Play	Results	Match 24: USA v HUN	Start List	Play by Play	Results
2 August 2021							
Match 25: JPN v RSA	Start List	Play by Play	Results				
Match 26: HUN v ITA	Start List	Play by Play	Results				
Match 27: GRE v USA	Start List	Play by Play	Results				

Group B
25 July 2021				27 July 2021			
Match 04: AUS v MNE	Start List	Play by Play	Results	Match 07: MNE v ESP	Start List	Play by Play	Results
Match 05: SRB v ESP	Start List	Play by Play	Results	Match 08: KAZ v SRB	Start List	Play by Play	Results
Match 06: CRO v KAZ	Start List	Play by Play	Results	Match 09: AUS v CRO	Start List	Play by Play	Results
29 July 2021				31 July 2021			
Match 16: ESP v KAZ	Start List	Play by Play	Results	Match 19: MNE v KAZ	Start List	Play by Play	Results
Match 17: CRO v MNE	Start List	Play by Play	Results	Match 20: AUS v ESP	Start List	Play by Play	Results
Match 18: SRB v AUS	Start List	Play by Play	Results	Match 21: CRO v SRB	Start List	Play by Play	Results
2 August 2021							
Match 28: SRB v MNE	Start List	Play by Play	Results				
Match 29: ESP v CRO	Start List	Play by Play	Results				
Match 30: AUS v KAZ	Start List	Play by Play	Results				

Knockout stage
4 August 2021				6 August 2021			
Match 31: GRE v MNE	Start List	Play by Play	Results	Match 35: MNE v CRO	Start List	Play by Play	Results
Match 32: ITA v SRB	Start List	Play by Play	Results	Match 36: ITA v USA	Start List	Play by Play	Results
Match 33: HUN v CRO	Start List	Play by Play	Results	Match 37: GRE v HUN	Start List	Play by Play	Results
Match 34: USA v ESP	Start List	Play by Play	Results	Match 38: SRB v ESP	Start List	Play by Play	Results
8 August 2021							
Match 39: MNE v ITA	Start List	Play by Play	Results				
Match 40: CRO v USA	Start List	Play by Play	Results				
Match 41: HUN v ESP	Start List	Play by Play	Results				
Match 42: GRE v SRB	Start List	Play by Play	Results				

=== Statistics ===
- Water Polo – Overall Team Statistics | Tokyo 2020 Olympics
- Water Polo – Team Statistics | Tokyo 2020 Olympics
- Water Polo – Individual Statistics | Tokyo 2020 Olympics
- Water Polo – Individual Statistics - Leading Scorers | Tokyo 2020 Olympics
- Water Polo – Goalkeeper Statistics | Tokyo 2020 Olympics
- Water Polo – Cumulative Statistics | Tokyo 2020 Olympics
  - Australia, Croatia, Greece, Hungary, Italy, Japan, Kazakhstan, Montenegro, Serbia, South Africa, Spain, United States

=== Medallists and victory ceremony presenters ===
- Water Polo – Medallists | Tokyo 2020 Olympics
- Water Polo – Victory Ceremony Presenters | Tokyo 2020 Olympics
