= Water polo at the 2019 World Aquatics Championships =

- Host city: Gwangju, South Korea
- Date(s): 14–27 July
- Venue(s): Nambu University Football Field
- Events: 2

Water polo at the 2019 World Aquatics Championships was held between 14 and 27 July 2019.

== Schedule ==
Two competitions were held.

All time are local (UTC+9).

Date	Time	Round
14 July 2019	08:30	Preliminary round
15 July 2019	08:30	Preliminary round
16 July 2019	08:30	Preliminary round
17 July 2019	08:30	Preliminary round
18 July 2019	08:30	Preliminary round
19 July 2019	08:30	Preliminary round
20 July 2019	10:30	Play-offs/Placement matches
21 July 2019	10:30	Play-offs/Placement matches
22 July 2019	08:00	Quarterfinals/Placement matches
23 July 2019	08:00	Quarterfinals/Placement matches
24 July 2019	09:30	Semifinals/Placement matches
25 July 2019	09:30	Semifinals/Placement matches
26 July 2019	14:00	Women's finals
27 July 2019	14:00	Men's finals

== Medal summary ==
=== Medal table ===
Rank	Nation	Gold	Silver	Bronze	Total
1	Italy	1	0	0	1
1	United States	1	0	0	1
3	Spain	0	2	0	2
4	Australia	0	0	1	1
4	Croatia	0	0	1	1
Totals (5 entries)		2	2	2	6

=== Medal events ===
Event	Gold	Silver	Bronze
Men	Italy Matteo Aicardi; Michaël Bodegas; Marco Del Lungo; Francesco Di Fulvio; Edoardo Di Somma; Vincenzo Dolce; Gonzalo Echenique; Niccolò Figari; Pietro Figlioli; Stefano Luongo; Gianmarco Nicosia; Vincenzo Renzuto; Alessandro Velotto	Spain Alberto Barroso; Alejandro Bustos; Sergi Cabañas; Miguel del Toro; Francisco Fernández; Álvaro Granados; Marc Larumbe; Daniel López; Eduardo Lorrio; Blai Mallarach; Alberto Munarriz; Felipe Perrone; Roger Tahull	Croatia Hrvoje Benić; Marko Bijač; Andro Bušlje; Loren Fatović; Xavier García; Maro Joković; Luka Lončar; Marko Macan; Ivan Marcelić; Lovre Miloš; Anđelo Šetka; Josip Vrlić; Ante Vukičević
Women	United States Rachel Fattal; Aria Fischer; Makenzie Fischer; Kaleigh Gilchrist; Stephania Haralabidis; Paige Hauschild; Ashleigh Johnson; Amanda Longan; Maddie Musselman; Kiley Neushul; Melissa Seidemann; Margaret Steffens; Alys Williams	Spain Marta Bach; Paula Crespí; Anni Espar; Clara Espar; Laura Ester; Judith Forca; Maica García Godoy; Irene González; Paula Leitón; Beatriz Ortiz; María del Pilar Peña; Elena Sánchez; Roser Tarragó	Australia Zoe Arancini; Elle Armit; Isobel Bishop; Hannah Buckling; Keesja Gofers; Bronte Halligan; Bronwen Knox; Lena Mihailović; Gabriella Palm; Amy Ridge; Madeleine Steere; Rowena Webster; Lea Yanitsas
