= Croatia at the 2019 World Aquatics Championships =

- Flag of Croatia
- World Aquatics code: CRO
- National federation: Croatian Swimming Federation
- Website: www.croswim.org

in Gwangju, South Korea
- Medals Ranked 23rd: Gold 0 Silver 0 Bronze 1 Total 1

World Aquatics Championships appearances
- 1994; 1998; 2001; 2003; 2005; 2007; 2009; 2011; 2013; 2015; 2017; 2019; 2022; 2023; 2024; 2025

Other related appearances
- Yugoslavia (1973–1991)

Croatia competed at the 2019 World Aquatics Championships in Gwangju, South Korea from 12 to 28 July.

== Medalists ==
Medal	Name	Sport	Event	Date
Bronze	Croatia men's national water polo team: Marko Bijač; Marko Macan; Loren Fatović; Luka Lončar; Maro Joković; Hrvoje Benić; Ante Vukičević; Andro Bušlje; Lovre Miloš; Josip Vrlić; Anđelo Šetka; Javier Gadea Garcia; Ivan Marcelić	Water polo	Men's tournament	27 July

== Diving ==
Croatia's diving team consisted of 2 athletes (1 male and 1 female).

Athlete	Event	Preliminaries		Semifinals		Final	
Athlete	Event	Points	Rank	Points	Rank	Points	Rank
Juraj Melša	Men's 1 m springboard	231.60	42	—N/a		did not advance	
Juraj Melša	Men's 3 m springboard	326.30	44	did not advance			
Marcela Marić	Women's 1 m springboard	199.75	35	—N/a		did not advance	
Marcela Marić	Women's 3 m springboard	197.05	44	did not advance			

== Swimming ==
Croatia entered 11 swimmers.

Men

Athlete	Event	Heat		Semifinal		Final	
Athlete	Event	Time	Rank	Time	Rank	Time	Rank
Bruno Blašković	50 m freestyle	22.55	33	did not advance			
Bruno Blašković	100 m freestyle	49.24	27	did not advance			
Anton Loncar	100 m backstroke	55.44	35	did not advance			
Anton Loncar	200 m backstroke	1:59.07	23	did not advance			
Ognjen Marić	200 m freestyle	1:50.84	41	did not advance			
Nikola Miljenić	50 m butterfly	24.06	35	did not advance			
Nikola Obrovac	50 m breaststroke	27.27	15 Q	27.31	14	did not advance	
Nikola Obrovac	100 m breaststroke	1:01.18	29	did not advance			
Kristofer Rogic	50 m backstroke	25.91	36	did not advance			
Filip Zelić	200 m butterfly	2:02.47	38	did not advance			
Anton Lončar; Nikola Obrovac; Nikola Miljenić; Bruno Blašković	4×100 m medley relay	3:37.18	19	—N/a		did not advance	

Women

Athlete	Event	Heat		Semifinal		Final	
Athlete	Event	Time	Rank	Time	Rank	Time	Rank
Ana Herceg	200 m backstroke	2:16.29	33	did not advance			
Ema Rajić	50 m breaststroke	32.39	36	did not advance			
Ema Rajić	100 m breaststroke	1:10.10	32	did not advance			
Matea Sumajstorčić	800 m freestyle	8:48.61	25	—N/a		did not advance	
Matea Sumajstorčić	1500 m freestyle	17:02.01	26	—N/a		did not advance	

== Water polo ==
=== Men's tournament ===
Team roster

- Marko Bijač
- Marko Macan
- Loren Fatović
- Luka Lončar
- Maro Joković
- Hrvoje Benić
- Ante Vukičević
- Andro Bušlje
- Lovre Miloš
- Josip Vrlić
- Anđelo Šetka
- Javier Gadea Garcia
- Ivan Marcelić
- Coach: Ivica Tucak

Group B

Pos	Team	Pld	W	D	L	GF	GA	GD	Pts	Qualification
1	Croatia	3	3	0	0	52	16	+36	6	Quarterfinals
2	United States	3	2	0	1	35	35	0	4	Playoffs
3	Australia	3	1	0	2	32	34	−2	2	Playoffs
4	Kazakhstan	3	0	0	3	20	54	−34	0	

Source: Sportresult
Rules for classification: 1) points; 2) head-to-head points; 3) head-to-head goal difference; 4) head-to-head number of goals scored; 5) Goal difference.

15 July 2019; 12:30	Report	Croatia	14–4	Australia	Nambu University Aquatics Center, Gwangju; Referees: Germán Moller (ARG), Alessandro Severo (ITA)
15 July 2019; 12:30	Report	Score by quarters: 4–1, 2–1, 4–0, 4–2			Nambu University Aquatics Center, Gwangju; Referees: Germán Moller (ARG), Alessandro Severo (ITA)
15 July 2019; 12:30	Report	Vukičević 6	Goals	Younger 2	Nambu University Aquatics Center, Gwangju; Referees: Germán Moller (ARG), Alessandro Severo (ITA)

17 July 2019; 09:50	Report	United States	7–17	Croatia	Nambu University Aquatics Center, Gwangju; Referees: Michiel Zwart (NED), Daniel Flahive (AUS)
17 July 2019; 09:50	Report	Score by quarters: 1–4, 3–5, 2–4, 1–4			Nambu University Aquatics Center, Gwangju; Referees: Michiel Zwart (NED), Daniel Flahive (AUS)
17 July 2019; 09:50	Report	Ramirez 2	Goals	four players 3	Nambu University Aquatics Center, Gwangju; Referees: Michiel Zwart (NED), Daniel Flahive (AUS)

19 July 2019; 20:30	Report	Croatia	21–5	Kazakhstan	Nambu University Aquatics Center, Gwangju; Referees: Sebastien Dervieux (FRA), Michiel Zwart (NED)
19 July 2019; 20:30	Report	Score by quarters: 6–1, 5–1, 5–1, 5–2			Nambu University Aquatics Center, Gwangju; Referees: Sebastien Dervieux (FRA), Michiel Zwart (NED)
19 July 2019; 20:30	Report	Joković, Šetka 3	Goals	five players 1	Nambu University Aquatics Center, Gwangju; Referees: Sebastien Dervieux (FRA), Michiel Zwart (NED)

Quarterfinals

23 July 2019; 15:30	Report	Croatia	10–8	Germany	Nambu University Aquatics Center, Gwangju; Referees: Michael Goldenberg (USA), Stanko Ivanovski (MNE)
23 July 2019; 15:30	Report	Score by quarters: 1–2, 3–1, 3–3, 3–2			Nambu University Aquatics Center, Gwangju; Referees: Michael Goldenberg (USA), Stanko Ivanovski (MNE)
23 July 2019; 15:30	Report	Joković 3	Goals	Gielen 3	Nambu University Aquatics Center, Gwangju; Referees: Michael Goldenberg (USA), Stanko Ivanovski (MNE)

Semifinals

25 July 2019; 17:00	Report	Spain	6–5	Croatia	Nambu University Aquatics Center, Gwangju; Referees: Georgios Stavridis (GRE), Adrian Alexandrescu (ROU)
25 July 2019; 17:00	Report	Score by quarters: 2–1, 2–1, 2–0, 0–3			Nambu University Aquatics Center, Gwangju; Referees: Georgios Stavridis (GRE), Adrian Alexandrescu (ROU)
25 July 2019; 17:00	Report	Mallarach 2	Goals	Joković 3	Nambu University Aquatics Center, Gwangju; Referees: Georgios Stavridis (GRE), Adrian Alexandrescu (ROU)

Third place game

27 July 2019; 17:00	Report	Croatia	10–7	Hungary	Nambu University Aquatics Center, Gwangju; Referees: Adrian Alexandrescu (ROU), Georgios Stavridis (GRE)
27 July 2019; 17:00	Report	Score by quarters: 2–1, 2–2, 2–2, 4–2			Nambu University Aquatics Center, Gwangju; Referees: Adrian Alexandrescu (ROU), Georgios Stavridis (GRE)
27 July 2019; 17:00	Report	Joković 6	Goals	Hárai, Manhercz 2	Nambu University Aquatics Center, Gwangju; Referees: Adrian Alexandrescu (ROU), Georgios Stavridis (GRE)
