= Anđelko =

Anđelko is a South Slavic masculine given name, meaning "Angel". Notable people with the name include:

- Anđelko Aleksić (1876–1904), Macedonian Serb Chetnik commander (voivode)
- Anđelko Ćuk (born 1983), volleyball player
- Anđelko Đuričić (born 1980), Serbian professional footballer
- Anđelko Habazin (1924–1978), Croatian philosopher
- Anđelko Jovanović (born 1999), Montenegrin footballer
- Anđelko Klobučar (1931–2016), Croatian composer, organist and music pedagogue
- Anđelko Krstić (1871–1952), Serb writer and patriot
- Anđelko Kvesić (born 1969), retired Bosnian football midfielder
- Anđelko Marušić (1911–1981), Yugoslav professional footballer
- Anđelko Milardović (born 1956), Croatian political scientist
- Anđelko Rističević (born 1985), Serbian long-distance runner
- Anđelko Runjić (1938–2015), Croatian politician, economist and diplomat
- Anđelko Savić (born 1993), Swiss professional footballer of Serbian descent
- Anđelko Tanasović, rebel leader active in Ottoman Macedonia
- Anđelko Tešan (born 1949), former Bosnian professional footballer
- Anđelko Vuletić (1933–2021), Yugoslav poet, novelist, drama writer

== See also ==
- Stadion Andelko Herjavec or Stadion Varteks, football stadium in Varaždin, Croatia
- Anđelka
- Anđelo
- Anđeo (given name)
