= Water polo at the 2019 World Aquatics Championships – Men's tournament =

Tournament details
- Venue: South Korea (in Gwangju host cities)
- Dates: 15–27 July
- Teams: 16 (from 5 confederations)

Final positions
- Champions: Italy (4th title)
- Runners-up: Spain
- Third place: Croatia
- Fourth place: Hungary

Tournament statistics
- Matches played: 48
- Goals scored: 1,020 (21.25 per match)
- Top scorers: (Montenegro) Aleksandar Ivović (21 goals)

Awards
- Best player: (Italy) Francesco Di Fulvio

The men's water polo tournament at the 2019 World Aquatics Championships, organised by the FINA, was held in Gwangju, South Korea from 15 to 27 July. This was the eighteenth time that the men's water polo tournament has been played since the first edition in 1973.

Italy defeated Spain in the final to win their fourth title, while Croatia won against Hungary to capture the bronze medal.

== Participating teams ==
Africa	Americas	Asia	Europe	Oceania
South Africa	Brazil; United States	Japan; Kazakhstan; South Korea	Croatia; Germany; Greece; Hungary; Italy; Montenegro; Serbia; Spain	Australia; New Zealand

== Draw ==
The draw was held on 7 April 2019.

=== Seeding ===
The seedings were announced on 6 February 2019.

Pot 1	Pot 2	Pot 3	Pot 4
Serbia; Australia; Hungary; Germany	Montenegro; Spain; Croatia; Brazil	Greece; United States; Italy; New Zealand	South Africa; Kazakhstan; Japan; South Korea

=== Groups formed ===
The draw resulted in the following groups:

Group A	Group B	Group C	Group D
Greece	Australia	Hungary	Brazil
Montenegro	Croatia	New Zealand	Germany
Serbia	Kazakhstan	South Africa	Italy
South Korea	United States	Spain	Japan

== Preliminary round ==
All times are local (UTC+9).

=== Group A ===
Pos	Team	Pld	W	D	L	GF	GA	GD	Pts	Qualification
1	Serbia	3	2	1	0	41	15	+26	5	Quarterfinals
2	Montenegro	3	1	2	0	44	26	+18	4	Playoffs
3	Greece	3	1	1	1	39	22	+17	3	Playoffs
4	South Korea (H)	3	0	0	3	11	72	−61	0	

Source: Sportresult
Rules for classification: 1) points; 2) head-to-head points; 3) head-to-head goal difference; 4) head-to-head number of goals scored; 5) Goal difference.
(H) Hosts

15 July 2019; 08:30	Report	Serbia	10–10	Montenegro	Nambu University Aquatics Center, Gwangju; Referees: Arkadi Voevodin (RUS), Michiel Zwart (NED)
15 July 2019; 08:30	Report	Score by quarters: 4–3, 2–2, 2–4, 2–1			Nambu University Aquatics Center, Gwangju; Referees: Arkadi Voevodin (RUS), Michiel Zwart (NED)
15 July 2019; 08:30	Report	S. Rašović 4	Goals	four players 2	Nambu University Aquatics Center, Gwangju; Referees: Arkadi Voevodin (RUS), Michiel Zwart (NED)

15 July 2019; 09:50	Report	South Korea	3–26	Greece	Nambu University Aquatics Center, Gwangju; Referees: Jeremy Cheng (SGP), Gabriella Várkonyi (HUN)
15 July 2019; 09:50	Report	Score by quarters: 0–7, 0–7, 1–3, 2–9			Nambu University Aquatics Center, Gwangju; Referees: Jeremy Cheng (SGP), Gabriella Várkonyi (HUN)
15 July 2019; 09:50	Report	Kim D. 2	Goals	three players 4	Nambu University Aquatics Center, Gwangju; Referees: Jeremy Cheng (SGP), Gabriella Várkonyi (HUN)

17 July 2019; 19:10	Report	Greece	10–10	Montenegro	Nambu University Aquatics Center, Gwangju; Referees: Adrian Alexandrescu (ROU), Alessandro Severo (ITA)
17 July 2019; 19:10	Report	Score by quarters: 3–3, 1–2, 4–4, 2–1			Nambu University Aquatics Center, Gwangju; Referees: Adrian Alexandrescu (ROU), Alessandro Severo (ITA)
17 July 2019; 19:10	Report	three players 2	Goals	Janović 3	Nambu University Aquatics Center, Gwangju; Referees: Adrian Alexandrescu (ROU), Alessandro Severo (ITA)

17 July 2019; 20:30	Report	Serbia	22–2	South Korea	Nambu University Aquatics Center, Gwangju; Referees: Ni Shi Wei (CHN), John Waldow (NZL)
17 July 2019; 20:30	Report	Score by quarters: 6–1, 5–0, 4–1, 7–0			Nambu University Aquatics Center, Gwangju; Referees: Ni Shi Wei (CHN), John Waldow (NZL)
17 July 2019; 20:30	Report	Jakšić 5	Goals	Han H., Lee Seong. 1	Nambu University Aquatics Center, Gwangju; Referees: Ni Shi Wei (CHN), John Waldow (NZL)

19 July 2019; 16:30	Report	Serbia	9–3	Greece	Nambu University Aquatics Center, Gwangju; Referees: Boris Margeta (SLO), Germán Moller (ARG)
19 July 2019; 16:30	Report	Score by quarters: 3–1, 3–2, 0–0, 3–0			Nambu University Aquatics Center, Gwangju; Referees: Boris Margeta (SLO), Germán Moller (ARG)
19 July 2019; 16:30	Report	Mandić 4	Goals	three players 1	Nambu University Aquatics Center, Gwangju; Referees: Boris Margeta (SLO), Germán Moller (ARG)

19 July 2019; 17:50	Report	South Korea	6–24	Montenegro	Nambu University Aquatics Center, Gwangju; Referees: Alessandro Severo (ITA), Ni Shi Wei (CHN)
19 July 2019; 17:50	Report	Score by quarters: 1–6, 1–4, 1–8, 3–6			Nambu University Aquatics Center, Gwangju; Referees: Alessandro Severo (ITA), Ni Shi Wei (CHN)
19 July 2019; 17:50	Report	Han H., Lee Seonu. 2	Goals	Ivović 6	Nambu University Aquatics Center, Gwangju; Referees: Alessandro Severo (ITA), Ni Shi Wei (CHN)

=== Group B ===
Pos	Team	Pld	W	D	L	GF	GA	GD	Pts	Qualification
1	Croatia	3	3	0	0	52	16	+36	6	Quarterfinals
2	United States	3	2	0	1	35	35	0	4	Playoffs
3	Australia	3	1	0	2	32	34	−2	2	Playoffs
4	Kazakhstan	3	0	0	3	20	54	−34	0	

Source: Sportresult
Rules for classification: 1) points; 2) head-to-head points; 3) head-to-head goal difference; 4) head-to-head number of goals scored; 5) Goal difference.

15 July 2019; 11:10	Report	United States	16–7	Kazakhstan	Nambu University Aquatics Center, Gwangju; Referees: Boris Margeta (SLO), Georgios Stavridis (GRE)
15 July 2019; 11:10	Report	Score by quarters: 4–1, 4–2, 3–2, 5–2			Nambu University Aquatics Center, Gwangju; Referees: Boris Margeta (SLO), Georgios Stavridis (GRE)
15 July 2019; 11:10	Report	Bowen 4	Goals	seven players 1	Nambu University Aquatics Center, Gwangju; Referees: Boris Margeta (SLO), Georgios Stavridis (GRE)

15 July 2019; 12:30	Report	Croatia	14–4	Australia	Nambu University Aquatics Center, Gwangju; Referees: Germán Moller (ARG), Alessandro Severo (ITA)
15 July 2019; 12:30	Report	Score by quarters: 4–1, 2–1, 4–0, 4–2			Nambu University Aquatics Center, Gwangju; Referees: Germán Moller (ARG), Alessandro Severo (ITA)
15 July 2019; 12:30	Report	Vukičević 6	Goals	Younger 2	Nambu University Aquatics Center, Gwangju; Referees: Germán Moller (ARG), Alessandro Severo (ITA)

17 July 2019; 08:30	Report	Australia	17–8	Kazakhstan	Nambu University Aquatics Center, Gwangju; Referees: Germán Moller (ARG), Dion Willis (RSA)
17 July 2019; 08:30	Report	Score by quarters: 4–1, 5–1, 3–4, 5–2			Nambu University Aquatics Center, Gwangju; Referees: Germán Moller (ARG), Dion Willis (RSA)
17 July 2019; 08:30	Report	Howden 4	Goals	Zhardan 3	Nambu University Aquatics Center, Gwangju; Referees: Germán Moller (ARG), Dion Willis (RSA)

17 July 2019; 09:50	Report	United States	7–17	Croatia	Nambu University Aquatics Center, Gwangju; Referees: Michiel Zwart (NED), Daniel Flahive (AUS)
17 July 2019; 09:50	Report	Score by quarters: 1–4, 3–5, 2–4, 1–4			Nambu University Aquatics Center, Gwangju; Referees: Michiel Zwart (NED), Daniel Flahive (AUS)
17 July 2019; 09:50	Report	Ramirez 2	Goals	four players 3	Nambu University Aquatics Center, Gwangju; Referees: Michiel Zwart (NED), Daniel Flahive (AUS)

19 July 2019; 19:10	Report	United States	12–11	Australia	Nambu University Aquatics Center, Gwangju; Referees: Adrian Alxandrescu (ROU), Arkadiy Voevodin (RUS)
19 July 2019; 19:10	Report	Score by quarters: 4–3, 3–3, 2–2, 3–3			Nambu University Aquatics Center, Gwangju; Referees: Adrian Alxandrescu (ROU), Arkadiy Voevodin (RUS)
19 July 2019; 19:10	Report	Cupido 3	Goals	four players 2	Nambu University Aquatics Center, Gwangju; Referees: Adrian Alxandrescu (ROU), Arkadiy Voevodin (RUS)

19 July 2019; 20:30	Report	Croatia	21–5	Kazakhstan	Nambu University Aquatics Center, Gwangju; Referees: Sebastien Dervieux (FRA), Michiel Zwart (NED)
19 July 2019; 20:30	Report	Score by quarters: 6–1, 5–1, 5–1, 5–2			Nambu University Aquatics Center, Gwangju; Referees: Sebastien Dervieux (FRA), Michiel Zwart (NED)
19 July 2019; 20:30	Report	Joković, Šetka 3	Goals	five players 1	Nambu University Aquatics Center, Gwangju; Referees: Sebastien Dervieux (FRA), Michiel Zwart (NED)

=== Group C ===
Pos	Team	Pld	W	D	L	GF	GA	GD	Pts	Qualification
1	Hungary	3	3	0	0	60	20	+40	6	Quarterfinals
2	Spain	3	2	0	1	57	19	+38	4	Playoffs
3	South Africa	3	0	1	2	16	54	−38	1	Playoffs
4	New Zealand	3	0	1	2	15	55	−40	1	

Source: Sportresult
Rules for classification: 1) points; 2) head-to-head points; 3) head-to-head goal difference; 4) head-to-head number of goals scored; 5) Goal difference.

15 July 2019; 16:30	Report	South Africa	3–23	Spain	Nambu University Aquatics Center, Gwangju; Referees: John Waldow (NZL), Vojin Putniković (SRB)
15 July 2019; 16:30	Report	Score by quarters: 1–6, 1–5, 1–4, 0–8			Nambu University Aquatics Center, Gwangju; Referees: John Waldow (NZL), Vojin Putniković (SRB)
15 July 2019; 16:30	Report	Rodda 2	Goals	Mallarach 5	Nambu University Aquatics Center, Gwangju; Referees: John Waldow (NZL), Vojin Putniković (SRB)

15 July 2019; 17:50	Report	New Zealand	4–24	Hungary	Nambu University Aquatics Center, Gwangju; Referees: An Jin-yong (KOR), Dion Willis (RSA)
15 July 2019; 17:50	Report	Score by quarters: 0–4, 1–7, 2–6, 1–7			Nambu University Aquatics Center, Gwangju; Referees: An Jin-yong (KOR), Dion Willis (RSA)
15 July 2019; 17:50	Report	four players 1	Goals	Zalánki 4	Nambu University Aquatics Center, Gwangju; Referees: An Jin-yong (KOR), Dion Willis (RSA)

17 July 2019; 11:10	Report	Hungary	13–11	Spain	Nambu University Aquatics Center, Gwangju; Referees: Boris Margenta (SLO), Michael Goldenberg (USA)
17 July 2019; 11:10	Report	Score by quarters: 4–2, 5–4, 3–0, 1–5			Nambu University Aquatics Center, Gwangju; Referees: Boris Margenta (SLO), Michael Goldenberg (USA)
17 July 2019; 11:10	Report	Zalánki 3	Goals	Granados 3	Nambu University Aquatics Center, Gwangju; Referees: Boris Margenta (SLO), Michael Goldenberg (USA)

17 July 2019; 12:30	Report	South Africa	8–8	New Zealand	Nambu University Aquatics Center, Gwangju; Referees: Georgios Stavridis (GRE), Stanko Ivanovski (MNE)
17 July 2019; 12:30	Report	Score by quarters: 2–0, 2–2, 2–4, 2–2			Nambu University Aquatics Center, Gwangju; Referees: Georgios Stavridis (GRE), Stanko Ivanovski (MNE)
17 July 2019; 12:30	Report	three players 2	Goals	Small 2	Nambu University Aquatics Center, Gwangju; Referees: Georgios Stavridis (GRE), Stanko Ivanovski (MNE)

19 July 2019; 08:30	Report	South Africa	5–23	Hungary	Nambu University Aquatics Center, Gwangju; Referees: Michael Goldenberg (USA), An Jin-yong (KOR)
19 July 2019; 08:30	Report	Score by quarters: 1–5, 2–5, 0–8, 2–5			Nambu University Aquatics Center, Gwangju; Referees: Michael Goldenberg (USA), An Jin-yong (KOR)
19 July 2019; 08:30	Report	Badenhorst 2	Goals	Zalánki 5	Nambu University Aquatics Center, Gwangju; Referees: Michael Goldenberg (USA), An Jin-yong (KOR)

19 July 2019; 09:50	Report	New Zealand	3–23	Spain	Nambu University Aquatics Center, Gwangju; Referees: Jeremy Cheng (SGP), Vojin Putniković (SRB)
19 July 2019; 09:50	Report	Score by quarters: 0–8, 1–5, 1–7, 1–3			Nambu University Aquatics Center, Gwangju; Referees: Jeremy Cheng (SGP), Vojin Putniković (SRB)
19 July 2019; 09:50	Report	three players 1	Goals	Barosso 6	Nambu University Aquatics Center, Gwangju; Referees: Jeremy Cheng (SGP), Vojin Putniković (SRB)

=== Group D ===
Pos	Team	Pld	W	D	L	GF	GA	GD	Pts	Qualification
1	Italy	3	3	0	0	31	19	+12	6	Quarterfinals
2	Germany	3	1	1	1	31	25	+6	3	Playoffs
3	Japan	3	1	1	1	27	27	0	3	Playoffs
4	Brazil	3	0	0	3	22	40	−18	0	

Source: Sportresult
Rules for classification: 1) points; 2) head-to-head points; 3) head-to-head goal difference; 4) head-to-head number of goals scored; 5) Goal difference.

15 July 2019; 19:10	Report	Brazil	5–14	Italy	Nambu University Aquatics Center, Gwangju; Referees: Stanko Ivanovski (MNE), Jaume Teixidó (ESP)
15 July 2019; 19:10	Report	Score by quarters: 3–5, 1–2, 0–5, 1–2			Nambu University Aquatics Center, Gwangju; Referees: Stanko Ivanovski (MNE), Jaume Teixidó (ESP)
15 July 2019; 19:10	Report	Guimarães 2	Goals	Luongo 4	Nambu University Aquatics Center, Gwangju; Referees: Stanko Ivanovski (MNE), Jaume Teixidó (ESP)

15 July 2019; 20:30	Report	Germany	9–9	Japan	Nambu University Aquatics Center, Gwangju; Referees: Michael Goldenberg (USA), Daniel Flahive (AUS)
15 July 2019; 20:30	Report	Score by quarters: 3–2, 4–3, 1–3, 1–1			Nambu University Aquatics Center, Gwangju; Referees: Michael Goldenberg (USA), Daniel Flahive (AUS)
15 July 2019; 20:30	Report	Stamm 3	Goals	Arai 3	Nambu University Aquatics Center, Gwangju; Referees: Michael Goldenberg (USA), Daniel Flahive (AUS)

17 July 2019; 16:30	Report	Japan	7–9	Italy	Nambu University Aquatics Center, Gwangju; Referees: Sebastien Dervieux (FRA), Jaume Teixidó (ESP)
17 July 2019; 16:30	Report	Score by quarters: 0–2, 2–1, 4–4, 1–2			Nambu University Aquatics Center, Gwangju; Referees: Sebastien Dervieux (FRA), Jaume Teixidó (ESP)
17 July 2019; 16:30	Report	Arai, Inaba 2	Goals	Figlioli 4	Nambu University Aquatics Center, Gwangju; Referees: Sebastien Dervieux (FRA), Jaume Teixidó (ESP)

17 July 2019; 17:50	Report	Brazil	8–15	Germany	Nambu University Aquatics Center, Gwangju; Referees: Nenad Periš (CRO), Arkadiy Voevodin (RUS)
17 July 2019; 17:50	Report	Score by quarters: 1–4, 1–6, 2–2, 4–3			Nambu University Aquatics Center, Gwangju; Referees: Nenad Periš (CRO), Arkadiy Voevodin (RUS)
17 July 2019; 17:50	Report	Coutinho 3	Goals	Stamm 5	Nambu University Aquatics Center, Gwangju; Referees: Nenad Periš (CRO), Arkadiy Voevodin (RUS)

19 July 2019; 11:10	Report	Brazil	9–11	Japan	Nambu University Aquatics Center, Gwangju; Referees: Nenad Periš (CRO), Viktor Salnichenko (KAZ)
19 July 2019; 11:10	Report	Score by quarters: 2–2, 1–5, 3–3, 3–1			Nambu University Aquatics Center, Gwangju; Referees: Nenad Periš (CRO), Viktor Salnichenko (KAZ)
19 July 2019; 11:10	Report	Guimarães 3	Goals	Shiga, Yoshida 3	Nambu University Aquatics Center, Gwangju; Referees: Nenad Periš (CRO), Viktor Salnichenko (KAZ)

19 July 2019; 12:30	Report	Germany	7–8	Italy	Nambu University Aquatics Center, Gwangju; Referees: Stanko Ivanovski (MNE), Daniel Flahive (AUS)
19 July 2019; 12:30	Report	Score by quarters: 2–1, 2–3, 3–2, 0–2			Nambu University Aquatics Center, Gwangju; Referees: Stanko Ivanovski (MNE), Daniel Flahive (AUS)
19 July 2019; 12:30	Report	Eidner 3	Goals	Aicardi, Di Fulvio 2	Nambu University Aquatics Center, Gwangju; Referees: Stanko Ivanovski (MNE), Daniel Flahive (AUS)

== Knockout stage ==
=== Bracket ===
Championship bracket

Playoffs
21 July
Spain	15
Japan	7
21 July
South Africa	5
Germany	25
21 July
Montenegro	11
Australia (PSO)	13
21 July
Greece	11
United States	9

Quarterfinals
23 July
Serbia	9
Spain	12
23 July
Croatia	10
Germany	8
23 July
Hungary	10
Australia	9
23 July
Italy	7
Greece	6

Semifinals
25 July
Spain	6
Croatia	5
25 July
Hungary	10
Italy	12

Final
27 July
Spain	5
Italy	10
Third place game
27 July
Croatia	10
Hungary	7

5th place bracket

5th–8th place semifinals
25 July
Serbia (PSO)	17
Germany	16
25 July
Australia	9
Greece	8

Fifth place game
27 July
Serbia	13
Australia	9
Seventh place game
27 July
Germany	6
Greece	11

9th place bracket

9th–12th place semifinals
23 July
Montenegro	14
Japan	7
23 July
United States	20
South Africa	3

Ninth place game
25 July
Montenegro	14
United States	15
Eleventh place game
25 July
Japan	15
South Africa	5

13th place bracket

13th–16th place semifinals
21 July
South Korea	4
Kazakhstan	17
21 July
New Zealand	8
Brazil	12

13th place game
23 July
Kazakhstan	8
Brazil	9
15th place game
23 July
South Korea (PSO)	17
New Zealand	16

=== Playoffs ===
21 July 2019; 14:00	Report	Montenegro	11–13 (PSO)	Australia	Nambu University Aquatics Center, Gwangju; Referees: Michael Goldenberg (USA), Viktor Salnichenko (KAZ)
21 July 2019; 14:00	Report	Score by quarters: 1–3, 3–2, 4–2, 1–2 PSO: 2–4			Nambu University Aquatics Center, Gwangju; Referees: Michael Goldenberg (USA), Viktor Salnichenko (KAZ)
21 July 2019; 14:00	Report	Ivović 3	Goals	Kayes 4	Nambu University Aquatics Center, Gwangju; Referees: Michael Goldenberg (USA), Viktor Salnichenko (KAZ)

21 July 2019; 15:30	Report	Greece	11–9	United States	Nambu University Aquatics Center, Gwangju; Referees: Germán Moller (ARG), Sebastien Dervieux (FRA)
21 July 2019; 15:30	Report	Score by quarters: 3–4, 3–2, 2–2, 3–1			Nambu University Aquatics Center, Gwangju; Referees: Germán Moller (ARG), Sebastien Dervieux (FRA)
21 July 2019; 15:30	Report	Genidounias 4	Goals	three players 2	Nambu University Aquatics Center, Gwangju; Referees: Germán Moller (ARG), Sebastien Dervieux (FRA)

21 July 2019; 17:00	Report	Spain	15–7	Japan	Nambu University Aquatics Center, Gwangju; Referees: Arkadiy Voevodin (RUS), Dion Willis (RSA)
21 July 2019; 17:00	Report	Score by quarters: 2–1, 3–3, 4–2, 6–1			Nambu University Aquatics Center, Gwangju; Referees: Arkadiy Voevodin (RUS), Dion Willis (RSA)
21 July 2019; 17:00	Report	Munarriz 6	Goals	Adachi 2	Nambu University Aquatics Center, Gwangju; Referees: Arkadiy Voevodin (RUS), Dion Willis (RSA)

21 July 2019; 18:30	Report	South Africa	5–25	Germany	Nambu University Aquatics Center, Gwangju; Referees: Jaume Teixidó (ESP), Juan Menéndez (CUB)
21 July 2019; 18:30	Report	Score by quarters: 2–5, 0–6, 1–9, 2–5			Nambu University Aquatics Center, Gwangju; Referees: Jaume Teixidó (ESP), Juan Menéndez (CUB)
21 July 2019; 18:30	Report	five players 1	Goals	Gielen 6	Nambu University Aquatics Center, Gwangju; Referees: Jaume Teixidó (ESP), Juan Menéndez (CUB)

=== Quarterfinals ===
23 July 2019; 14:00	Report	Serbia	9–12	Spain	Nambu University Aquatics Center, Gwangju; Referees: Georgios Stavridis (GRE), Michiel Zwart (NED)
23 July 2019; 14:00	Report	Score by quarters: 1–2, 2–5, 4–3, 2–2			Nambu University Aquatics Center, Gwangju; Referees: Georgios Stavridis (GRE), Michiel Zwart (NED)
23 July 2019; 14:00	Report	S. Rašović 4	Goals	three players 2	Nambu University Aquatics Center, Gwangju; Referees: Georgios Stavridis (GRE), Michiel Zwart (NED)

23 July 2019; 15:30	Report	Croatia	10–8	Germany	Nambu University Aquatics Center, Gwangju; Referees: Michael Goldenberg (USA), Stanko Ivanovski (MNE)
23 July 2019; 15:30	Report	Score by quarters: 1–2, 3–1, 3–3, 3–2			Nambu University Aquatics Center, Gwangju; Referees: Michael Goldenberg (USA), Stanko Ivanovski (MNE)
23 July 2019; 15:30	Report	Joković 3	Goals	Gielen 3	Nambu University Aquatics Center, Gwangju; Referees: Michael Goldenberg (USA), Stanko Ivanovski (MNE)

23 July 2019; 17:00	Report	Hungary	10–9	Australia	Nambu University Aquatics Center, Gwangju; Referees: Arkadiy Voevodin (RUS), Vojin Putniković (SRB)
23 July 2019; 17:00	Report	Score by quarters: 3–3, 2–3, 3–1, 2–2			Nambu University Aquatics Center, Gwangju; Referees: Arkadiy Voevodin (RUS), Vojin Putniković (SRB)
23 July 2019; 17:00	Report	Vámos, Zalánki 3	Goals	four players 2	Nambu University Aquatics Center, Gwangju; Referees: Arkadiy Voevodin (RUS), Vojin Putniković (SRB)

23 July 2019; 18:30	Report	Italy	7–6	Greece	Nambu University Aquatics Center, Gwangju; Referees: Boris Margeta (SLO), Adrian Alexandrescu (ROU)
23 July 2019; 18:30	Report	Score by quarters: 2–2, 2–1, 2–3, 1–0			Nambu University Aquatics Center, Gwangju; Referees: Boris Margeta (SLO), Adrian Alexandrescu (ROU)
23 July 2019; 18:30	Report	Di Fulvio, Luongo 2	Goals	Genidounias, Gounas 2	Nambu University Aquatics Center, Gwangju; Referees: Boris Margeta (SLO), Adrian Alexandrescu (ROU)

=== 13th–16th place semifinals ===
21 July 2019; 10:30	Report	South Korea	4–17	Kazakhstan	Nambu University Aquatics Center, Gwangju; Referees: Daniel Flahive (AUS), Vojin Putniković (SRB)
21 July 2019; 10:30	Report	Score by quarters: 1–4, 2–4, 0–7, 1–2			Nambu University Aquatics Center, Gwangju; Referees: Daniel Flahive (AUS), Vojin Putniković (SRB)
21 July 2019; 10:30	Report	four players 1	Goals	Aubakirov 4	Nambu University Aquatics Center, Gwangju; Referees: Daniel Flahive (AUS), Vojin Putniković (SRB)

21 July 2019; 12:00	Report	New Zealand	8–12	Brazil	Nambu University Aquatics Center, Gwangju; Referees: Frank Ohme (GER), Kunihiro Sato (JPN)
21 July 2019; 12:00	Report	Score by quarters: 1–2, 4–6, 2–2, 1–2			Nambu University Aquatics Center, Gwangju; Referees: Frank Ohme (GER), Kunihiro Sato (JPN)
21 July 2019; 12:00	Report	Small 3	Goals	P. Real, Guimarães 3	Nambu University Aquatics Center, Gwangju; Referees: Frank Ohme (GER), Kunihiro Sato (JPN)

=== 9th–12th place semifinals ===
23 July 2019; 11:00	Report	Montenegro	14–7	Japan	Nambu University Aquatics Center, Gwangju; Referees: Germán Moller (ARG), Alessandro Severo (ITA)
23 July 2019; 11:00	Report	Score by quarters: 3–2, 4–1, 4–3, 3–1			Nambu University Aquatics Center, Gwangju; Referees: Germán Moller (ARG), Alessandro Severo (ITA)
23 July 2019; 11:00	Report	Ivović, Murišić 3	Goals	Arai, Inaba 2	Nambu University Aquatics Center, Gwangju; Referees: Germán Moller (ARG), Alessandro Severo (ITA)

23 July 2019; 12:30	Report	United States	20–3	South Africa	Nambu University Aquatics Center, Gwangju; Referees: Jeremy Cheng (SGP), Daniel Flahive (AUS)
23 July 2019; 12:30	Report	Score by quarters: 5–0, 8–1, 5–2, 2–0			Nambu University Aquatics Center, Gwangju; Referees: Jeremy Cheng (SGP), Daniel Flahive (AUS)
23 July 2019; 12:30	Report	three players 4	Goals	three players 1	Nambu University Aquatics Center, Gwangju; Referees: Jeremy Cheng (SGP), Daniel Flahive (AUS)

=== 5th–8th place semifinals ===
25 July 2019; 14:00	Report	Serbia	17–16 (PSO)	Germany	Nambu University Aquatics Center, Gwangju; Referees: Dion Willis (RSA), Sebastien Dervieux (FRA)
25 July 2019; 14:00	Report	Score by quarters: 3–3, 3–3, 2–3, 4–3 PSO: 5–4			Nambu University Aquatics Center, Gwangju; Referees: Dion Willis (RSA), Sebastien Dervieux (FRA)
25 July 2019; 14:00	Report	Mandić 5	Goals	three players 2	Nambu University Aquatics Center, Gwangju; Referees: Dion Willis (RSA), Sebastien Dervieux (FRA)

25 July 2019; 15:30	Report	Australia	9–8	Greece	Nambu University Aquatics Center, Gwangju; Referees: Michael Goldenberg (USA), Nenad Peris (CRO)
25 July 2019; 15:30	Report	Score by quarters: 3–2, 2–3, 3–3, 1–0			Nambu University Aquatics Center, Gwangju; Referees: Michael Goldenberg (USA), Nenad Peris (CRO)
25 July 2019; 15:30	Report	Kayes 3	Goals	Kapotsis, Kolomvos 2	Nambu University Aquatics Center, Gwangju; Referees: Michael Goldenberg (USA), Nenad Peris (CRO)

=== Semifinals ===
25 July 2019; 17:00	Report	Spain	6–5	Croatia	Nambu University Aquatics Center, Gwangju; Referees: Georgios Stavridis (GRE), Adrian Alexandrescu (ROU)
25 July 2019; 17:00	Report	Score by quarters: 2–1, 2–1, 2–0, 0–3			Nambu University Aquatics Center, Gwangju; Referees: Georgios Stavridis (GRE), Adrian Alexandrescu (ROU)
25 July 2019; 17:00	Report	Mallarach 2	Goals	Joković 3	Nambu University Aquatics Center, Gwangju; Referees: Georgios Stavridis (GRE), Adrian Alexandrescu (ROU)

25 July 2019; 18:30	Report	Hungary	10–12	Italy	Nambu University Aquatics Center, Gwangju; Referees: Michiel Zwart (NED), Boris Margeta (SLO)
25 July 2019; 18:30	Report	Score by quarters: 4–2, 1-5, 2-2, 3-3			Nambu University Aquatics Center, Gwangju; Referees: Michiel Zwart (NED), Boris Margeta (SLO)
25 July 2019; 18:30	Report	three players 2	Goals	Echenique 4	Nambu University Aquatics Center, Gwangju; Referees: Michiel Zwart (NED), Boris Margeta (SLO)

=== 15th place game ===
23 July 2019; 08:00	Report	South Korea	17–16 (PSO)	New Zealand	Nambu University Aquatics Center, Gwangju; Referees: Jaume Teixidó (ESP), Sebastien Dervieux (FRA)
23 July 2019; 08:00	Report	Score by quarters: 3–3, 2–2, 4–5, 3–2 PSO: 5–4			Nambu University Aquatics Center, Gwangju; Referees: Jaume Teixidó (ESP), Sebastien Dervieux (FRA)
23 July 2019; 08:00	Report	Gwon Y-g 3	Goals	Lewis 4	Nambu University Aquatics Center, Gwangju; Referees: Jaume Teixidó (ESP), Sebastien Dervieux (FRA)

=== 13th place game ===
23 July 2019; 09:30	Report	Kazakhstan	8–9	Brazil	Nambu University Aquatics Center, Gwangju; Referees: Nenad Peris (CRO), Frank Ohme (GER)
23 July 2019; 09:30	Report	Score by quarters: 3–3, 2–2, 1–2, 2–2			Nambu University Aquatics Center, Gwangju; Referees: Nenad Peris (CRO), Frank Ohme (GER)
23 July 2019; 09:30	Report	three players 2	Goals	Real 3	Nambu University Aquatics Center, Gwangju; Referees: Nenad Peris (CRO), Frank Ohme (GER)

=== Eleventh place game ===
25 July 2019; 09:30	Report	Japan	15–5	South Africa	Nambu University Aquatics Center, Gwangju; Referees: Viktor Salnichenko (KAZ), Juan Menéndez (CUB)
25 July 2019; 09:30	Report	Score by quarters: 5–1, 4–1, 3–2, 3–1			Nambu University Aquatics Center, Gwangju; Referees: Viktor Salnichenko (KAZ), Juan Menéndez (CUB)
25 July 2019; 09:30	Report	Inaba, Shimizu 3	Goals	Evezard 2	Nambu University Aquatics Center, Gwangju; Referees: Viktor Salnichenko (KAZ), Juan Menéndez (CUB)

=== Ninth place game ===
25 July 2019; 11:00	Report	Montenegro	14–15	United States	Nambu University Aquatics Center, Gwangju; Referees: Frank Ohme (GER), Daniel Flahive (AUS)
25 July 2019; 11:00	Report	Score by quarters: 2–4, 6–4, 4–4, 2–3			Nambu University Aquatics Center, Gwangju; Referees: Frank Ohme (GER), Daniel Flahive (AUS)
25 July 2019; 11:00	Report	Ivović 6	Goals	Hooper 4	Nambu University Aquatics Center, Gwangju; Referees: Frank Ohme (GER), Daniel Flahive (AUS)

=== Seventh place game ===
27 July 2019; 14:00	Report	Germany	6–11	Greece	Nambu University Aquatics Center, Gwangju; Referees: Stanko Ivanovski (MNE), Nenad Peris (CRO)
27 July 2019; 14:00	Report	Score by quarters: 2–1, 2–3, 0–2, 2–5			Nambu University Aquatics Center, Gwangju; Referees: Stanko Ivanovski (MNE), Nenad Peris (CRO)
27 July 2019; 14:00	Report	Stamm 2	Goals	Dervisis 3	Nambu University Aquatics Center, Gwangju; Referees: Stanko Ivanovski (MNE), Nenad Peris (CRO)

=== Fifth place game ===
27 July 2019; 15:30	Report	Serbia	13–9	Australia	Nambu University Aquatics Center, Gwangju; Referees: Dion Willis (RSA), Sebastien Dervieux (FRA)
27 July 2019; 15:30	Report	Score by quarters: 6–1, 3–2, 1–2, 3–4			Nambu University Aquatics Center, Gwangju; Referees: Dion Willis (RSA), Sebastien Dervieux (FRA)
27 July 2019; 15:30	Report	Ćuk, Rašović 4	Goals	Ford, Younger 2	Nambu University Aquatics Center, Gwangju; Referees: Dion Willis (RSA), Sebastien Dervieux (FRA)

=== Third place game ===
27 July 2019; 17:00	Report	(bronze) Croatia	10–7	Hungary	Nambu University Aquatics Center, Gwangju; Referees: Adrian Alexandrescu (ROU), Georgios Stavridis (GRE)
27 July 2019; 17:00	Report	Score by quarters: 2–1, 2–2, 2–2, 4–2			Nambu University Aquatics Center, Gwangju; Referees: Adrian Alexandrescu (ROU), Georgios Stavridis (GRE)
27 July 2019; 17:00	Report	Joković 6	Goals	Hárai, Manhercz 2	Nambu University Aquatics Center, Gwangju; Referees: Adrian Alexandrescu (ROU), Georgios Stavridis (GRE)

=== Final ===
27 July 2019; 18:30	Report	(silver) Spain	5–10	Italy (gold)	Nambu University Aquatics Center, Gwangju; Referees: Boris Margeta (SLO), Michael Goldenberg (USA)
27 July 2019; 18:30	Report	Score by quarters: 2–2, 1–3, 1–3, 1–2			Nambu University Aquatics Center, Gwangju; Referees: Boris Margeta (SLO), Michael Goldenberg (USA)
27 July 2019; 18:30	Report	Perrone 2	Goals	Dolce 2	Nambu University Aquatics Center, Gwangju; Referees: Boris Margeta (SLO), Michael Goldenberg (USA)

== Final ranking ==
Qualified for the 2020 Olympic Games
Qualified for the 2020 Olympic Games as winner of 2019 World League

Rank	Team
1st place, gold medalist(s)	Italy
2nd place, silver medalist(s)	Spain
3rd place, bronze medalist(s)	Croatia
4	Hungary
5	Serbia
6	Australia
7	Greece
8	Germany
9	United States
10	Montenegro
11	Japan
12	South Africa
13	Brazil
14	Kazakhstan
15	South Korea
16	New Zealand

2019 Men's Water Polo World Champions

Italy
Fourth title

Team roster: Marco Del Lungo, Francesco Di Fulvio, Stefano Luongo, Pietro Figlioli (C), Edoardo Di Somma, Alessandro Velotto, Vincenzo Renzuto, Gonzalo Echenique, Niccolò Figari, Michaël Bodegas, Matteo Aicardi, Vincenzo Dolce, Gianmarco Nicosia
Head coach: Sandro Campagna

== Medalists ==
Gold	Silver	Bronze
Italy Marco Del Lungo; Francesco Di Fulvio; Stefano Luongo; Pietro Figlioli (c); Edoardo Di Somma; Alessandro Velotto; Vincenzo Renzuto; Gonzalo Echenique; Niccolò Figari; Michaël Bodegas; Matteo Aicardi; Vincenzo Dolce; Gianmarco Nicosia Head coach: Alessandro Campagna	Spain Daniel López; Alberto Munarriz; Álvaro Granados; Miguel de Toro; Sergi Cabanas; Marc Larumbe; Alberto Barroso Macarro; Francisco Fernández Miranda; Roger Tahull; Felipe Perrone (c); Blai Mallarach; Alejandro Bustos; Eduardo Lorrio Head coach: David Lozano	Croatia Marko Bijač; Marko Macan; Loren Fatović; Luka Lončar; Maro Joković; Hrvoje Benić; Ante Vukičević; Andro Bušlje (c); Lovre Miloš; Josip Vrlić; Anđelo Šetka; Xavier García; Ivan Marcelić Head coach: Ivica Tucak

== Awards and statistics ==
=== Top goalscorers ===
Rank	Name	Team	Goals	Shots	%
1	Aleksandar Ivović	Montenegro	21	35	60
2	Maro Joković	Croatia	19	30	63
3	Gergő Zalánki	Hungary	18	39	46
4	Strahinja Rašović	Serbia	16	29	55
5	Joe Kayes	Australia	15	29	52
5	Luuk Gielen	Germany	15	34	44
5	Álvaro Granados	Spain	15	38	39
5	Blai Mallarach	Spain	15	40	38
5	Alberto Munarriz	Spain	15	34	44
10	Marko Stamm	Germany	14	33	42
10	Dušan Mandić	Serbia	14	31	45
10	Johnny Hooper	United States	14	20	70

=== Awards ===
The awards and all-star team were announced on 26 July 2019.

Most Valuable Player

- (Italy) Francesco Di Fulvio

Most Valuable Goalkeeper

- (Spain) Daniel López

Highest Goalscorer

- (Montenegro) Aleksandar Ivović – 21 goals

Media All-Star Team

- (Spain) Daniel López – Goalkeeper
- (Spain) Roger Tahull – Centre forward
- (Italy) Francesco Di Fulvio
- (Montenegro) Aleksandar Ivović
- (Croatia) Maro Joković
- (Serbia) Dušan Mandić
- (Hungary) Gergő Zalánki
