= 2015 LEN Super Cup =

Water polo match

The 2015 LEN Super Cup was a water polo match organized by LEN and contested by the reigning champions of the two main European club competitions, the 2014-15 LEN Champions League and the 2014-15 LEN Euro Cup.

== Squads ==
The members of the two squads were as follows.

=== CN Posillipo ===
No.	Name	Date of birth	Position	L/R	Height	Weight
1	Enrico Caruso		Goalkeeper	R		
2	Nicola Cuccovillo			R		
3	Jerko Marinić-Kragić			R		
4	Gianluigi Foglio			R		
5	Filip Klikovac			R		
6	Elio Russo			R		
7	Vincenzo Renzuto Iodice			R		
8	Valentino Gallo			R		
9	Andro Bušlje			R		
10	Nicola Ferrone			R		
11	Lorenzo Briganti			R		
12	Paride Saccoia			R		
13	Tommaso Negri		Goalkeeper	R		
14	Giacomo Saviano			R		
15	Vincenzo Dolce			R		
16	Mikailo Sudomliak			R		
17	Marco Ricci			R		
18	Domenico Iodice			R		

=== Pro Recco ===
No.	Name	Date of birth	Position	L/R	Height	Weight
1	Aleksandar Ivović	24 February 1986		R	198	107
2	Andrea Fondelli	27 February 1994		R	188	85
3	Michael Bodegas	3 May 1987		R		
4	Francesco Di Fulvio	15 August 1993		R	188	82
5	Filip Filipović	2 May 1987		R	197	101
6	Giacomo Pastorino	7 June 1980	Goalkeeper	R	191	95
7	Alex Giorgetti	24 December 1987		R	186	78
8	Dušan Mandić	16 June 1994		R		
9	Massimo Giacoppo	10 May 1983		R	183	92
10	Matteo Aicardi	19 April 1986		R	192	104
11	Niccolo' Figari	24 January 1988		R	198	90
12	Niccolo' Gitto	12 October 1986		R	190	89
13	Pietro Figlioli	29 May 1984		R	192	97
14	Dusko Pijetlović	25 April 1985		R	192	105
15	Andrija Prlainović	28 April 1987		R	187	95
16	Stefano Tempesti	9 June 1979	Goalkeeper	R	203	97
17	Sandro Sukno	30 June 1990		R		
18	Fabio Viola	9 January 1996	Goalkeeper	R	195	103

== See also ==
- 2015 Women's LEN Super Cup
