= Milardović =

Milardović is a Croatian surname. Notable people with the surname include:

- Anđelko Milardović (born 1956), Croatian political scientist
- Josip Milardović (born 1982), Croatian footballer
- Stjepan Milardović (born 1953), former Croatian footballer
- Tomislav Milardovic (born 1982), Australian footballer
