= Anđela =

Anđela is a South Slavic feminine given name, cognate to Angela.

Notable people with the name include:

- Anđela Bulatović (born 1987), Montenegrin handball player
- Anđela Frajtović (born 2000), Serbian football player
- Anđela Janjušević (born 1995), Serbian handball player
- Anđela Krstić (born 2001), Serbian football player
- Anđela Mužinić (born 1992), Croatian table tennis player
- Anđela Šešlija (born 1995), Bosnian football player

== See also ==
- Anđelo
