= Anđelka =

Anđelka is a South Slavic feminine given name.

Notable people with the name include:

- Anđelka Atanasković (born 1958), Serbian engineer and politician
- Anđelka Bego-Šimunić (1941–2022), Bosnian-Herzegovinian composer of Croatian descent
- Anđelka Martić (1924–2020), Croatian writer
- Anđelka Tomašević (born 1993), Serbian model

== See also ==
- Anđelko
- Angela (given name)
- Andrija i Anđelka, 2015 Serbian sitcom where a titular character is called Anđelka
