= Anđeo =

Anđeo is a masculine given name. Notable people with the name include:

- Anđeo Kraljević (1807–1879), Herzegovinian Croat Franciscan friar
- Anđeo Lovrov Zadranin (fl. 14th century), Croatian architect
- Anđeo Zvizdović (c. 1420–1498), Franciscan friar and evangelist in medieval Bosnia

== See also ==
- Angel (given name)
- Anđelo
- Anđelko
