= Anđelo =

Anđelo is a South Slavic masculine given name. Notable people with the name include:

- Anđelo Jurkas, Croatian writer
- Anđelo Kvesić (born 1995), Croatian karateka
- Anđelo Milevoj (born 1941), Croatian football player
- Anđelo Rudović (born 1996), Montenegrin football player
- Anđelo Srzentić (born 1990), Croatian football player
- Anđelo Šetka (born 1985), Croatian water polo player

== See also ==
- Angel (given name)
- Anđeo (given name)
- Anđela
