= Hrvoje Benić =

Croatian water polo player

Personal information
- Nationality: Croatian
- Born: 26 April 1992 (age 34)
- Height: 198
- Weight: 103

Sport
- Sport: Water polo
- Handedness: Right
- Position: Field player
- Current club: Retired
- Number: 11

Senior clubs
- Years: Team
- 2008-2014: VK Jug
- 2014-2015: Sportul Studentesc Bucharest
- 2015-2022: VK Jug
- 2022-2025: Waspo 98 Hannover
National team
- Years: Team
- Croatia
Medal record
World Championships
Bronze medal – third place	2019 Gwanjgu	Team

Hrvoje Benić (born 26 April 1992) is a Croatian water polo player for Waspo 98 Hannover and the Croatian national team.

He participated at the 2019 World Championships.

== See also ==
- List of World Aquatics Championships medalists in water polo
