= Francesco Di Fulvio =

Italian water polo player (born 1993)

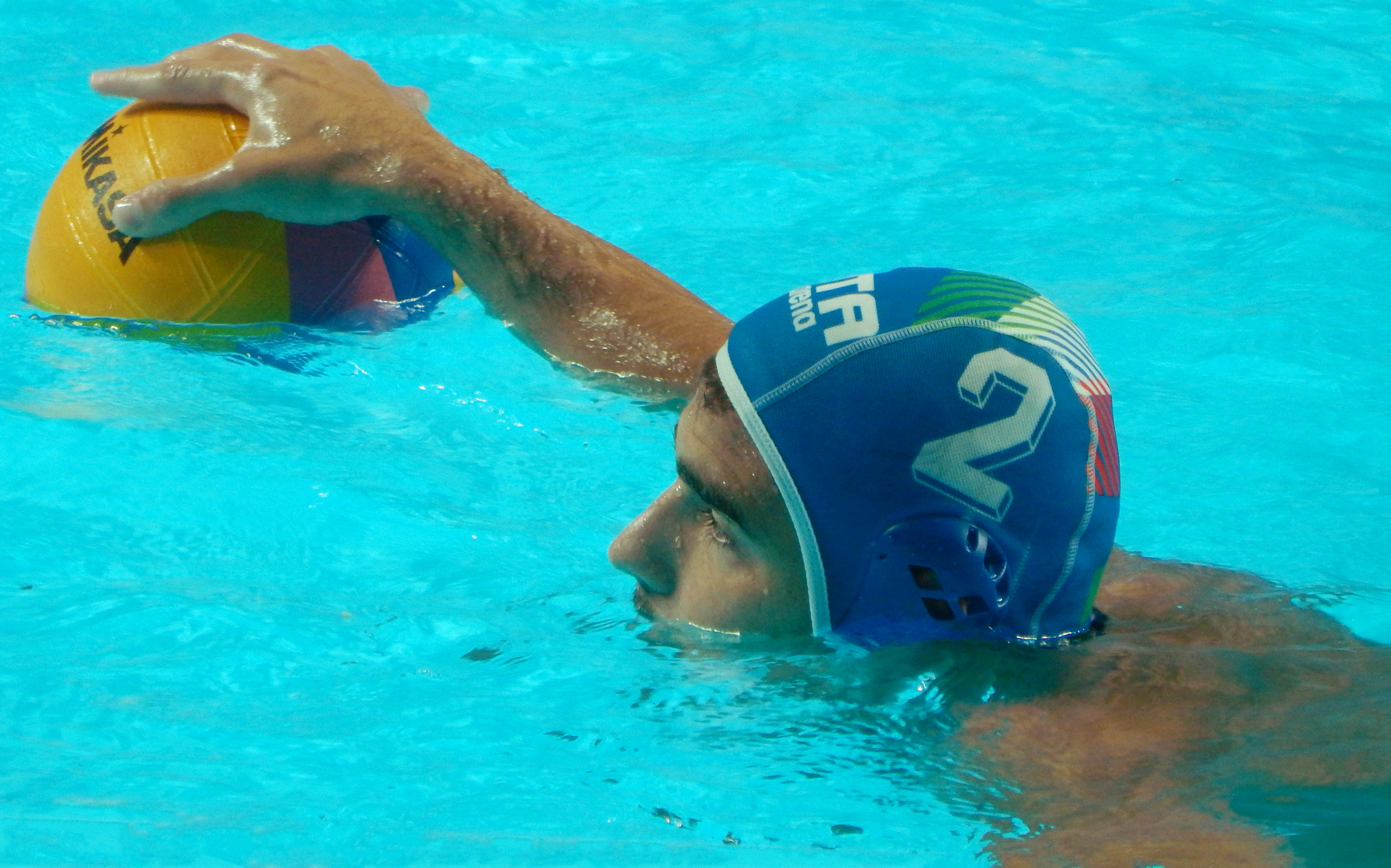

Personal information
- Nationality: Italian
- Born: 15 August 1993 (age 33) Pescara, Italy
- Height: 1.90 m (6 ft 3 in)
- Weight: 88 kg (194 lb)

Sport
- Sport: Water polo
- Handedness: Right
- Position: Left wing/Left driver
- Current club: Pro Recco
- Number: 2

Senior clubs
- Years: Team
- 2009–2010: Roma
- 2010–2013: Florentia
- 2013–2014: Brescia
- 2014–present: Pro Recco
Medal record
Representing Italy
Olympic Games
Bronze medal – third place	2016 Rio de Janeiro	Team
World Championship
Gold medal – first place	2019 Gwangju	Team
Silver medal – second place	2022 Budapest	Team
Silver medal – second place	2024 Doha	Team
European Championship
Bronze medal – third place	2014 Budapest
Bronze medal – third place	2024 Zagreb
FINA World League
Silver medal – second place	2017 Ruza
World Cup
Silver medal – second place	2023 Los Angeles
Youth World Championship
Gold medal – first place	2013 Szombathely
Youth European Championship
Gold medal – first place	2010 Stuttgart
Gold medal – first place	2012 Roussillon

Francesco Di Fulvio (born 15 August 1993) is an Italian professional water polo player. He was part of the Italian team at the 2016 Summer Olympics, where the team won the bronze medal.

== Honours ==
Pro Recco

- LEN Champions League: 2014–15, 2020–21, 2021–22, 2022–23; runners-up: 2017–18
- LEN Super Cup: 2015, 2021, 2022
- Serie A: 2014–15, 2015–16, 2016–17, 2017–18, 2018–19, 2021–22, 2022–23
- Coppa Italia: 2014–15, 2015–16, 2016–17, 2017–18, 2018–19, 2020–21, 2021–22, 2022–23

=== Individual ===
- FINA "World Player of the Year" award (2): 2019, 2022
- Swimming World Magazine's man water polo "World Player of the Year" award (2): 2019, 2022
- Total-Waterpolo-World Magazine's man water polo "World Player of the Year" award: 2022
- LEN "European Player of the Year" award (2): 2019, 2022
- Member of the World Team by total-waterpolo (2): 2019, 2022
- LEN Champions League MVP: 2021–22
- LEN Champions League Right Winger of the Year (2): 2017–18, 2021–22
- World Championship MVP (2): 2019 Gwangju, 2024 Doha
- World Championship Team of the Tournament (4): 2015, 2017, 2019, 2022, 2024
- Serie A1 MVP (2): 2018–19, 2021–22
- Serie A1 Top Scorer: 2020–21
- Serie A Left Winger of the Year (8): 2013–14, 2014–15, 2015–16, 2016–17, 2017–18, 2018–19, 2021–22, 2022–23
- Serie A Young Player of the Year (4): 2009–10, 2010–11, 2011–12, 2012–13
- Italian Water Polo Player of the Year (9): 2014, 2015, 2016, 2017, 2018, 2019, 2021, 2022, 2023

== See also ==
- Italy men's Olympic water polo team records and statistics
- List of Olympic medalists in water polo (men)
- List of world champions in men's water polo
- List of World Aquatics Championships medalists in water polo

Awards
Preceded by (Hungary) Márton Vámos	Most Valuable Player of Water Polo World Championship; 2019	Succeeded by Incumbent
Preceded by (Montenegro) Aleksandar Ivović	Swimming World Magazine; Water Polo Player of the Year; 2019	Succeeded by (Serbia) Filip Filipović
