= Anđelko Vuletić =

Croatian-Bosnian poet (1933–2021)

Anđelko Vuletić (6 February 1933 – 21 October 2021) was a Yugoslav and later Croatian and Bosnian-Herzegovinian poet, novelist, drama writer, writer for children, literary critic and translator from French. He studied in his hometown of Trebinje and then at the Faculty of Philosophy (literature) in Belgrade. He was the winner of the Annual Awards of the Society of Writers of Bosnia and Herzegovina in 1965 for the collection of poems Sedam vječnih pitanja (Seven Eternal Questions) and of numerous other awards and accolades.

== Works ==
- Gorko sunce (novel, 1958)
- Gramatika ili progonstvo (poems, 1961)
- Jedina nada (poems, 1962)
- Drvo s paklenih vrata (novel, 1963)
- Sedam vječnih pitanja (poems, 1965)
- Deveto čudo na istoku (novel, 1966)
- Kraljica puteva (poems, 1968)
- Zmije odlaze s onu stranu svijeta (poems, 1967)
- Poezija (selection, 1971)
- Klesar Tadija Tegoba (children's novel, 1973)
- Putnik na svoju odgovornost (poems, 1985)
- Kad budem velik kao mrav (poems, 1977)
- Čempres u zavičaju (selection, 1980)
- Dan hapšenja Vile Vukas (novel, 1980)
- Jadi mladog karijerista (novel, 1984)
- Križaljka za čitanje sudbine (poems, 1985)
- Čudotvorna biljka doktora Engela (novel, 1989)
- Popravni ispit (poems, 1989)
- Andrija Hebrang (drama, 1990)
- Miljenik partije Buharin (drama, 1987)
- Pčela i metak (poems, 1995)
- Pisma nebeskom gromu (poems, 1996)
- Sarajevo a zalazi sunce (poems, 1996)
- Tajna večera (poems, 1997)
- Strijeljanje ustaše Broza (novel, 1998)
- Izabrane pjesme (1999)

Some of his works were included in the Polish-language anthology Żywe źródła in 1996, translated and edited by Łucja Danielewska.
