= Anđelko Kvesić =

Bosnian footballer

Personal information
- Date of birth: 21 February 1969 (age 57)
- Place of birth: Bosnia and Herzegovina
- Position: Midfielder

Senior career*
Years	Team	Apps	(Gls)
1988–1989	Velež Mostar		
1992	NK Zagreb	11	(3)
1993	Inker Zaprešić	6	(0)
1993–1994	Dubrava	4	(0)
1994–1997	Segesta	66	(6)
1997–1998	Westerlo	3	(0)
2000–2001	Zrinjski Mostar	13	(9)
2001–2002	Kamen Ingrad	5	(0)
- * Club domestic league appearances and goals

Anđelko Kvesić (born 21 February 1969) is a retired Bosnian football midfielder.
