= Anđelko Milardović =

Croatian political scientist

Andelko Milardović (November 12, 1956, Ogulin, Croatia) is a Croatian political scientist, sociologist and college professor, also a scientific researcher of the Institute for Migration and Ethnic Studies in Zagreb. He is the founder and director of the Centre for Political Researches and more recently "Think Thank" Institute of European and globalization studies.

He studied Political Science in Ljubljana and Zagreb. He graduated at the Faculty of Political Sciences in Zagreb, University of Zagreb in 1981 with the Thesis, entitled: Science as a Production Force, under the mentorship of Davor Rodin, a famous philosophy professor. In 1986 he earned his master's degree at the same Faculty with the Master's Thesis, entitled: The concept of Activity in Amold Gehlen's Philosophical Anthropology, under the mentorship of Branka Brujić. In October 1989 he earned his PhD degree at the Faculty of Political Sciences, University of Belgrade and the topic of his dissertation was Spontaneous and Institutional Political Activity. A Comparison Between Sociopolitical and Politological Perspective of Political Activity. His mentor was Vukašin Pavlović. From 1987 onwards, he has been permanently employed at the Institute for Migration and Ethnic Studies as a senior research scientist, pursuing research in migration policy and sociology of foreigners in a time of globalization and xenophobia.

He received further professional education in Göttingen, Bonn and Wien in 1987, 1991 and 1994, respectively. In 1994 he visited Professor Klaus von Beyme at the Institute of Political Science in Heidelberg. From 1981 to 1987 he worked as a high school professor in Osijek. He then moved to Zagreb in 1987 where he got the permanent position at the Institute for Migration and Ethnic Studies. In 2006 he was granted the status of a full professor of Political Theory at the Faculty of Political Sciences but due to his “Croatian nationalism” he wasn't allowed to give lectures.

From 1997 to 2009 he served as a lecturer at the Centre for Croatian Studies where he was teaching Political Science, Political Sociology and Contemporary Political Ideas, while at the University of Dubrovnik he taught courses Introduction in Political Science, History of Political Ideas and Contemporary Political Ideas and Ideologies. Since 2012 he has been teaching Political Marketing at postgraduate level at the University of Osijek. He works as a guest professor lecturing Sociology of Culture at the University College for Communication Management Edward Bernays in Zagreb. He teaches courses Sociology of the Information Society and the Sociology of Globalization at the University College for Applied Computer Engineering. He teaches Sociology of the Information Society at the University College for Information Technologies. He has recently started lecturing the course entitled Political Forms and Ideas at the University College Sjever in Koprivnica and Varaždin.

In 1994 he established a publishing house Pan Liber in Osijek, specialized in the field of political science; In 2001 he established a Political Science Research Centre (www.cpi.hr), specialized in transition research, globalization, political parties and system where he has served as a director for many years.

During his studies at the Faculty of Political Sciences at the University of Zagreb he was greatly influenced by the German philosophy and sociology school. Hegel, Marx, Nietzsche, Husserl, Heidegger, as well as Plessner and Scheller, representatives of the German philosophical anthropology, are all philosophers whose work he studied a lot. He defended his Master's Thesis, entitled The Concept of Activity in Amold Gehlen's Philosophical Anthropology in the field of philosophical anthropology. German sociologists who influenced him the most are Max Weber, Alfred Schutz, Georg Simmel, Niklas Luhman, and recently Urlich Beck and his work on globalization issues and risk society.

Throughout his career both as professor and researcher he focused on the Political Philosophy, History of Political Ideas and Political Theory with strong emphasis on Contemporary Political Ideas and Ideologies. Within the context of the Theory of the Political Systems and Comparative Politics he presented Political Systems in Austria and Germany. In the late 1990s he began a systematic research of the globalization issues and political theory of democracy and post-democracy in the period of globalization. Milardovic is situated in Zagreb, the capital of Croatia.
