= Daniel López (water polo) =

Spanish water polo player (born 1980)

Personal information
- Full name: Daniel López Pinedo
- Nationality: Spain
- Born: 16 July 1980 (age 46) Barcelona, Spain
- Height: 189 cm (74 in)
- Weight: 90 kg (198 lb)

Sport
- Sport: Water polo
- Handedness: Right
- Position: Goalkeeper
- Current club: Atlètic-Barceloneta
- Number: 1

Senior clubs
- Years: Team
- 1997–2000: Mediterrani
- 2000–2008: Sant Andreu
- 2008–2022: Atlètic-Barceloneta
National team
- Years: Team
- 2009–2021: Spain
Medal record
Men's water polo
Representing Spain
World Championships
Silver medal – second place	2009 Rome	Team
Silver medal – second place	2019 Gwangju	Team
FINA World Cup
Bronze medal – third place	2010 Oradea	Team
European Championships
Silver medal – second place	2018 Barcelona	Team
Silver medal – second place	2020 Budapest	Team
FINA World League
Silver medal – second place	2012 Kazakhstan
Bronze medal – third place	2018 Budapest
- Updated on 12 March 2020

Daniel López Pinedo (Note: In this Spanish name, the first or paternal surname is López and the second or maternal family name is Pinedo.) (born 16 July 1980 in Barcelona) is a Spanish water polo goalkeeper who competed for the Spain men's national water polo team in two Summer Olympics (2012 London and 2016 Rio. He helped Spanish water polo club CN Atlètic-Barceloneta win the LEN Champions League in 2013–14 season. He is 6 ft 3 inches tall.

== Honours ==
=== Club ===
Atlètic-Barceloneta

- LEN Champions League: 2013–14
- LEN Super Cup: 2014
- Spanish Championship: 2008–09, 2009–10, 2010–11, 2011–12, 2012–13, 2013–14, 2014–15, 2015–16, 2016–17, 2017–18, 2018–19, 2019–20, 2020–21, 2021–22
- Copa del Rey: 2008–09, 2009–10, 2012–13, 2013–14, 2014–15, 2015–16, 2016–17, 2017–18, 2018–19, 2019–20, 2020–21, 2021–22
- Supercopa de España: 2009, 2010, 2011, 2013, 2015, 2016, 2017, 2018, 2019
- Copa de Cataluña: 2008–09, 2009–10, 2010–11, 2012–13, 2013–14, 2014–15, 2016–17

== Awards ==
- All-Tournament Team of the 2019 World Championship
- Second Top European Player in the World by LEN: 2018, 2019
- Member of the World Team 2018 by total-waterpolo
- Best Goalkeeper of 2009–10, 2011–12, 2014–15, 2015–16, 2016–17, 2017–18, 2018–19 Spanish Championship with Atlètic-Barceloneta
- Best Goalkeeper of 2018 European Championship
- Best Goalkeeper of 2020 European Championship
- Best Goalkeeper of 2019 World Championship
- All-Tournament Team of the 2019 World Championship

== See also ==
- Spain men's Olympic water polo team records and statistics
- List of men's Olympic water polo tournament goalkeepers
- List of World Aquatics Championships medalists in water polo
