= Gonzalo Echenique =

Argentine-born Italian water polo player

Gonzalo Óscar Echenique Saglietti
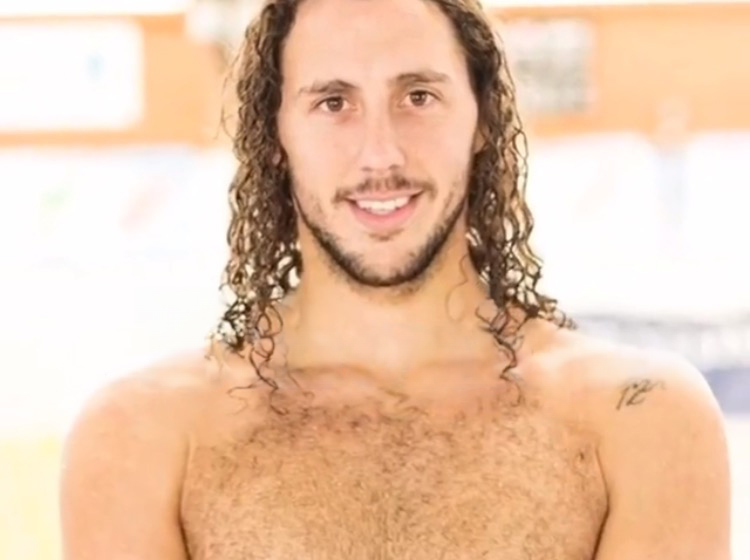

Personal information
- Nationality: Italian/Argentinian
- Born: 27 April 1990 (age 36) Rosario, Argentina
- Height: 194 cm (76 in)
- Weight: 96 kg (212 lb)

Sport
- Sport: Water polo
- Handedness: Left
- Position: Wing/Driver
- Current club: Pro Recco

Senior clubs
- Years: Team
- 2011–2013: CN Sabadell
- 2013–2014: CN Atlètic-Barceloneta
- 2014–2015: Pro Recco
- 2015–2016: VK Primorje
- 2016–present: Pro Recco
Medal record
World Championships
Gold medal – first place	2019 Gwangju	Team
Silver medal – second place	2022 Budapest	Team
Silver medal – second place	2024 Doha	Team
European Championship
Bronze medal – third place	2024 Zagreb
World Cup
Silver medal – second place	2023 Los Angeles

Gonzalo Óscar Echenique Saglietti (Note: In this name that follows Hispanic American naming customs, the first or paternal surname is Echenique and the second or maternal family name is Saglietti.) (born 27 April 1990) is an Argentine-born Italian professional water polo player. He was part of the Spanish team at the 2016 Summer Olympics, where the team finished in seventh place.

He became World champion as a member of the Italian team at the 18th FINA World Aquatics Championships, held in Gwangju, Korea in 2019.

== Honours ==
=== Club ===
CN Sabadell

- Copa del Rey: 2011–12

CN Atlètic-Barceloneta

- LEN Champions League: 2013–14
- Spanish Championship: 2013–14
- Copa del Rey: 2013–14
- Copa de Cataluña: 2013–14

Pro Recco

- LEN Champions League: 2020–21, 2021–22, 2022–23; runners-up : 2017–18
- LEN Super Cup: 2021, 2022
- Serie A: 2016–17, 2017–18, 2018–19, 2021–22, 2022–23
- Coppa Italia: 2016–17, 2017–18, 2018–19, 2020–21, 2021–22, 2022–23

== See also ==
- Spain men's Olympic water polo team records and statistics
- List of world champions in men's water polo
- List of World Aquatics Championships medalists in water polo
