= Marios Kapotsis =

Greek water polo player

Personal information
- Born: 13 September 1991 (age 34) Athens, Greece
- Height: 183 cm (6 ft 0 in)
Medal record
Representing Greece
Olympic Games
Silver medal – second place	2020 Tokyo	Team
FINA World League
Bronze medal – third place	2020 Tbilisi	Team
Bronze medal – third place	2020 Gwanju	Team
Mediterranean Games
Silver medal – second place	2018 Tarragona	Team
- Updated on 2 August 2018

Marios Kapotsis (born 13 September 1991) is a Greek water polo player. He is part of Greece men's national water polo team that competes at the 2017 World Aquatics Championships in Budapest.

At club level, Kapotsis currently plays for NC Vouliagmeni. From 2012 to 2014 he played for Olympiacos, with whom he won 2 Greek Championships and 2 Greek Cups.

In August 2021, he won the silver medal with Greece in the water polo tournament at the 2020 Summer Olympics.

== See also ==
- Greece at the 2017 World Aquatics Championships
