= Lovre Miloš =

Croatian water polo player

Personal information
- Nationality: Croatian
- Born: 5 April 1994 (age 32)

Sport
- Sport: Water polo
- Position: Field player
- Current club: HAVK Mladost
- Number: 3

Senior clubs
- Years: Team
- HAVK Mladost
National team
- Years: Team
- Croatia
Medal record
World Championships
Bronze medal – third place	2019 Gwanjgu	Team

Lovre Miloš (born 5 April 1994) is a retired Croatian water polo player for HAVK Mladost and the Croatian national team.

He participated at the 2019 World Championships.

== See also ==
- List of World Aquatics Championships medalists in water polo
