= Ivan Marcelić =

Croatian water polo player

Personal information
- Nationality: Croatian
- Born: 18 February 1994 (age 32)
- Height: 1.92 m (6 ft 4 in)
- Weight: 114 kg (251 lb) BARAKUDE NA OI U TOKIJU 2020.

Sport
- Sport: Water polo
- Position: Goalkeeper
- Current club: HAVK Mladost
- Number: 1

Senior clubs
- Years: Team
- HAVK Mladost
National team
- Years: Team
- Croatia
Medal record
World Championships
Bronze medal – third place	2019 Gwanjgu	Team

Ivan Marcelić (born 18 February 1994) is a Croatian water polo player for HAVK Mladost and the Croatian national team.

He participated at the 2019 World Championships.

== See also ==
- List of world champions in men's water polo
- List of World Aquatics Championships medalists in water polo
