= Ante Vukičević =

Croatian water polo player

Personal information
- Nationality: Croatian
- Born: 24 February 1993 (age 33) Zagreb, Croatia

Sport
- Sport: Water polo
- Handedness: Right
- Position: Field player
- Current club: CN Marseille
- Number: 11

Senior clubs
- Years: Team
- CN Marseille
National team
- Years: Team
- Croatia
Medal record
Men's water polo
Representing Croatia
Olympic Games
Silver medal – second place	2024 Paris	Team
World Championships
Gold medal – first place	2024 Doha	Team
Bronze medal – third place	2019 Gwanjgu	Team
European Championship
Silver medal – second place	2024 Zagreb

Ante Vukičević (born 24 February 1993) is a Croatian water polo player for CN Marseille and the Croatian national team.

He participated at the 2019 World Championships.

== See also ==
- List of world champions in men's water polo
- List of World Aquatics Championships medalists in water polo
