= Marko Macan =

Croatian water polo player

Personal information
- Nationality: Croatian
- Born: 26 April 1993 (age 33) Dubrovnik, Croatia
- Height: 1.96 m (6 ft 5 in)
- Weight: 112 kg (247 lb)

Sport
- Sport: Water polo
- Position: Field player
- Current club: Waspo 98 Hannover
- Number: 5

Senior clubs
- Years: Team
- VK Jug
National team
- Years: Team
- Croatia
Medal record
Representing Croatia
Olympic Games
Silver medal – second place	2016 Rio de Janeiro	Team
World Championship
Gold medal – first place	2017 Budapest	Team
Bronze medal – third place	2019 Gwanjgu	Team
European Championship
Bronze medal – third place	2018 Barcelona

Marko Macan (born 26 April 1993) is a Croatian water polo player. He was part of the Croatian team at the 2016 Summer Olympics, where the team won the silver medal.

== See also ==
- List of Olympic medalists in water polo (men)
- List of world champions in men's water polo
- List of World Aquatics Championships medalists in water polo
