= Anđelo Šetka =

Croatian water polo player

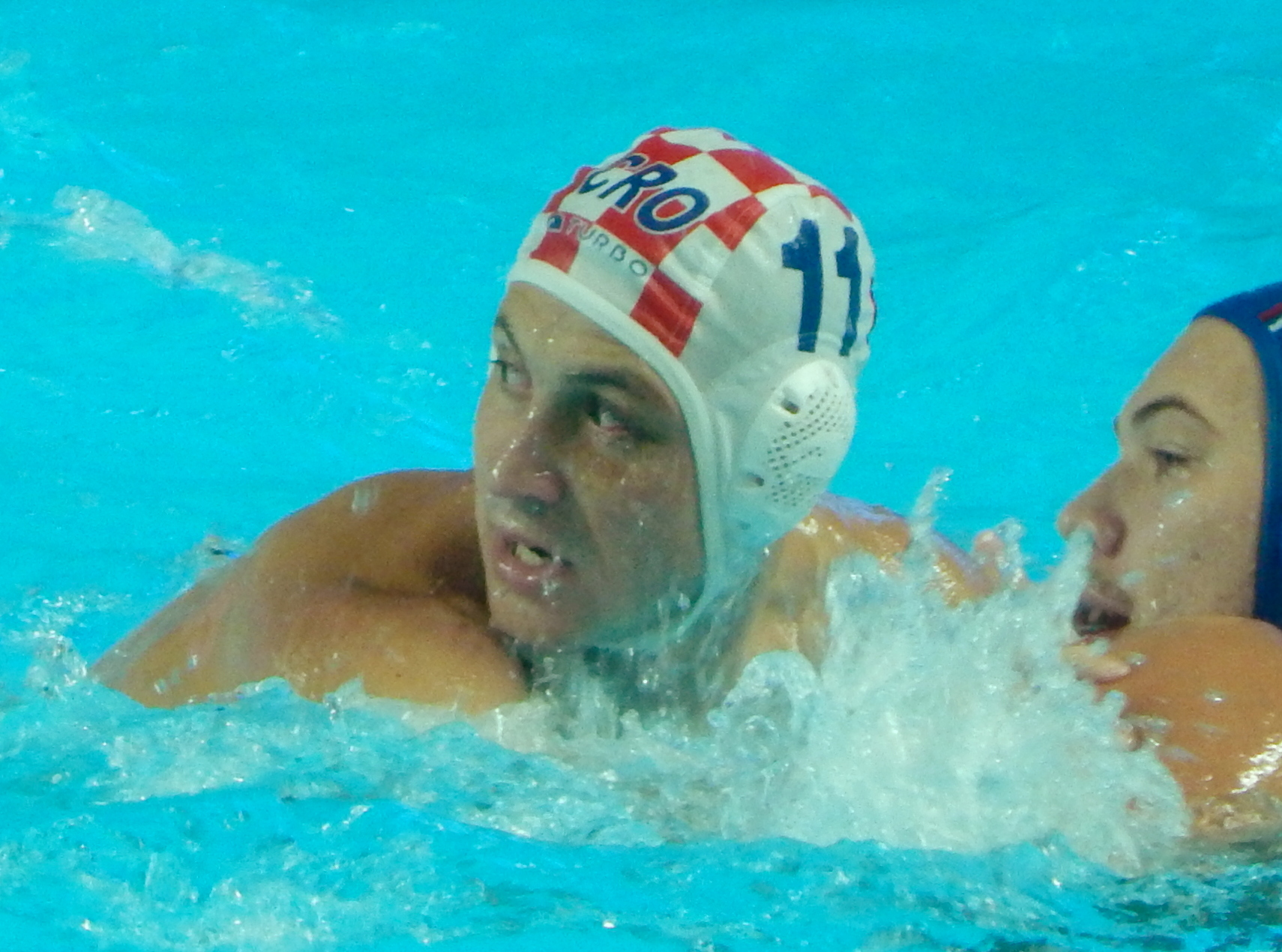

Personal information
- Nationality: Croatian
- Born: 14 September 1985 (age 41) Split, SR Croatia, SFR Yugoslavia
- Height: 1.86 m (6 ft 1 in)
- Weight: 87 kg (192 lb)

Sport
- Sport: Water polo
- Handedness: Right
- Position: Wing
- Current club: VK Jadran

Senior clubs
- Years: Team
- VK Jadran
National team
- Years: Team
- Croatia
Medal record
Men's water polo
Representing Croatia
Olympic Games
Silver medal – second place	2016 Rio de Janeiro	Team
World Championships
Gold medal – first place	2017 Budapest	Team
Silver medal – second place	2015 Kazan	Team
Bronze medal – third place	2013 Barcelona	Team
Bronze medal – third place	2019 Gwanjgu	Team
European Championships
Bronze medal – third place	2018 Barcelona	Team
Mediterranean Games
Gold medal – first place	2013 Mersin	Team

Anđelo Šetka (born 14 September 1985) is a Croatian water polo player. He was part of the Croatian team at the 2016 Summer Olympics, where the team won the silver medal.

== See also ==
- Croatia men's Olympic water polo team records and statistics
- List of Olympic medalists in water polo (men)
- List of world champions in men's water polo
- List of World Aquatics Championships medalists in water polo
