= Alessandro Velotto =

Italian water polo player (born 1995)

Personal information
- Nationality: Italian
- Born: 12 February 1995 (age 31) Naples, Italy

Sport
- Sport: Water polo
Medal record
Olympic Games
Bronze medal – third place	2016 Rio de Janeiro	Team
World Championships
Silver medal – second place	2024 Doha	Team
World Cup
Silver medal – second place	2023 Los Angeles
European Championship
Bronze medal – third place	2024 Zagreb

Alessandro Velotto (born 12 February 1995) is an Italian professional water polo player. He competed in the men's tournament at the 2016 Summer Olympics, and was part of the team that won the bronze medal. He competed in the men's tournament at the 2024 Summer Olympics.

== See also ==
- List of Olympic medalists in water polo (men)
- List of world champions in men's water polo
- List of World Aquatics Championships medalists in water polo
