= Michaël Bodegas =

Italian water polo player

Personal information
- Full name: Michaël Alexandre Bodegas
- Born: 3 May 1987 (age 39) La Seyne-sur-Mer, France
- Height: 192 cm (6 ft 4 in)
- Weight: 102 kg (225 lb)

Sport
- Country: Italy / France
- Sport: Water polo
- Club: CN Marseille
Medal record
Representing Italy
Olympic Games
Bronze medal – third place	2016 Rio de Janeiro	Team competition
World Championships
Gold medal – first place	2019 Gwangju	Team competition

Michaël Alexandre Bodegas (born 3 May 1987) is a water polo player from Italy. He was part of the Italian team at the 2016 Summer Olympics, where the team won the bronze medal.

Bodegas also competed for Italy at the 2020 Summer Olympics and France at the 2024 Summer Olympics

== See also ==
- List of Olympic medalists in water polo (men)
- List of world champions in men's water polo
- List of World Aquatics Championships medalists in water polo
