= Vincenzo Renzuto =

Italian water polo player (born 1993)

Personal information
- Full name: Vincenzo Renzuto Iodice
- Nationality: Italian
- Born: 8 April 1993 (age 33) Naples, Italy
- Height: 1.91 m (6 ft 3 in)

Sport
- Sport: Water polo
Medal record
World Championships
Silver medal – second place	2024 Doha	Team
World Cup
Silver medal – second place	2023 Los Angeles
European Championship
Bronze medal – third place	2024 Zagreb

Vincenzo Renzuto Iodice (born 8 April 1993) is an Italian water polo player. He competed in the 2020 Summer Olympics.
