= Pietro Figlioli =

Italian water polo player (born 1984)

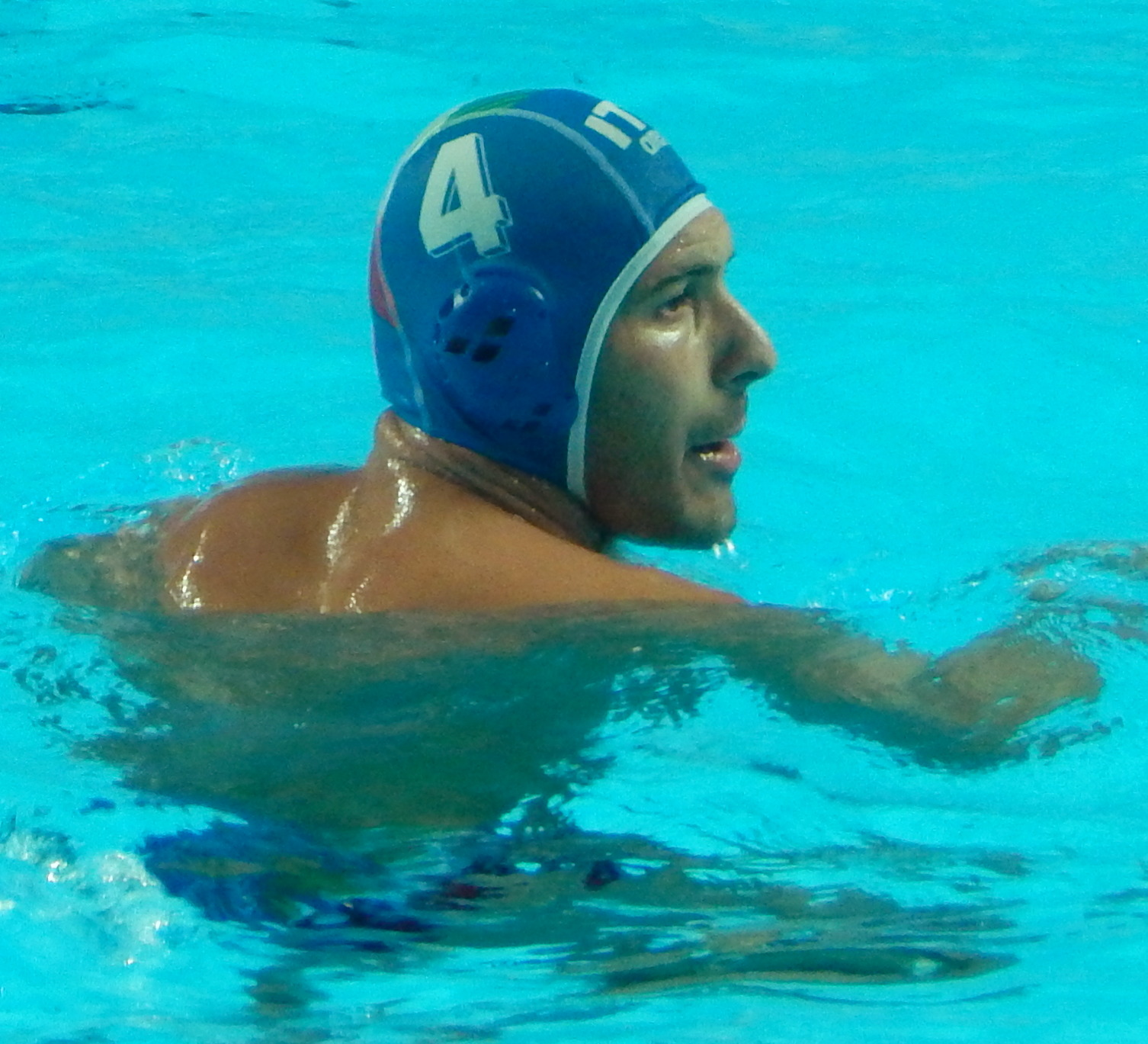
- Figlioli at the 2015 World Championships

Personal information
- Nationality: Brazilian/Italian
- Born: 29 May 1984 (age 42) Rio de Janeiro, Brazil
- Height: 1.91 m (6 ft 3 in)
- Weight: 98 kg (216 lb)

Sport
- Country: Australia; Italy
- Sport: Water polo
- Club: CN Barcelona; RN Sori; Pro Recco; BPM Sport Management
Medal record
Representing Australia
FINA World League
Bronze medal – third place	2007 Berlin
Representing Italy
Olympic Games
Silver medal – second place	2012 London	Team
Bronze medal – third place	2016 Rio de Janeiro	Team
World Championships
Gold medal – first place	2011 Shanghai	Team
European Championships
Bronze medal – third place	2014 Budapest	Team

Pietro Figlioli (born 29 May 1984) is an Italian professional water polo player. He competed for Australia at the 2004 and 2008 Olympics and for Italy in 2012 and 2016 and won two medals for Italy. He also won the world title in 2011. In 2012 he received the Gold Collar of Sporting Merit from the Italian Olympic Committee.

== Personal life ==
Figlioli was born in Brazil, but his family moved to Australia when he was three years old. His father José Fiolo is a former Olympic swimmer. Figlioli is married to Laura and has sons Lorenzo and Matteo.

== Career ==
Figlioli started competing with the North Brisbane Polo Bears at Albany Creek, Queensland in Australia. He was part of Australia's Olympic squad for the 2004 and 2008 Summer Olympics. He was the top sprinter at these two Olympics, with 24 and 21 sprints won, respectively. He was also a member of the Australian squad that finished 10th at the 2007 FINA World Championships in Melbourne and won the bronze medal at the 2007 FINA Water Polo World League in Berlin. Figlioli is regarded as one of the world's fastest water polo swimmers and shooters.

In May 2009, Figlioli signed a deal with Italian club Pro Recco. The deal included becoming an Italian citizen, to comply with the Italian league's rule changes to restrict extra-European players from two to one player per team. As a result of this, he was able to play for Italy at the 2012 and 2016 Olympics, winning a medal on both occasions. He was the joint top sprinter at the 2012 Olympics, with 19 sprints won.

== See also ==
- Italy men's Olympic water polo team records and statistics
- List of Olympic medalists in water polo (men)
- List of players who have appeared in multiple men's Olympic water polo tournaments
- List of men's Olympic water polo tournament top goalscorers
- List of sportspeople who competed for more than one nation
- List of world champions in men's water polo
- List of World Aquatics Championships medalists in water polo
