= Water polo at the 2020 Summer Olympics – Women's team rosters =

These are the rosters of all participating teams at the women's water polo tournament at the 2020 Summer Olympics in Tokyo. The ten national teams were required to submit squads of 12 players. Additionally, teams could name one alternate player. In the event that a player on the submitted squad list suffered an injury or illness, that player would be able to be replaced by the player in the alternate list. On 3 July 2021, the International Olympic Committee (IOC) confirmed that there was a change for the 2020 Summer Olympics, allowing all 13 water polo players named to be available on the roster, with 12 being named for each match. This change was implemented due to the challenges of the COVID-19 pandemic. As of 7 August 2021, all players competed in the women's tournament.

As the head coach of the South Africa women's national water polo team, Delaine Mentoor became the first female head coach in the men's and women's Olympic water polo tournaments.

== Abbreviations ==
No.	Cap number	(C)	Captain		
Pos	Playing position	FP	Field player	GK	Goalkeeper
CB	Centre back	CF	Centre forward	D	Driver
L/R	Handedness	L	Left-handed	R	Right-handed
Apps	International matches played	OG	Olympic participations	Goals	Goals scored in Olympic Games

== Group A ==
=== Australia ===
Australia's final squad was announced on 24 May 2021.

Head coach: Predrag Mihailović

No.	Player	Pos.	L/R	Height	Weight	Date of birth (age)	Apps	OG/ Goals	Club	Ref
1	Lea Yanitsas	GK	R	1.73 m (5 ft 8 in)	77 kg (170 lb)	15 March 1989 (aged 32)	156	1/0	(Australia) UNSW Killer Whales	
2	Keesja Gofers	D	R	1.76 m (5 ft 9 in)	70 kg (154 lb)	16 March 1990 (aged 31)	201	1/5	(Australia) Sydney University Lions	
3	Hannah Buckling	CB	R	1.77 m (5 ft 10 in)	75 kg (165 lb)	3 June 1992 (aged 29)	184	1/5	(Australia) Sydney University Lions	
4	Bronte Halligan	D	R	1.80 m (5 ft 11 in)	70 kg (154 lb)	12 August 1996 (aged 24)	103	0/0	(Australia) UNSW Killer Whales	
5	Elle Armit	CF	R	1.85 m (6 ft 1 in)		20 August 1991 (aged 29)	70	0/0	(Australia) Drummoyne Devils	
6	Bronwen Knox	CB	R	1.82 m (6 ft 0 in)	88 kg (194 lb)	16 April 1986 (aged 35)	387	3/20	(Australia) Queensland Thunder	
7	Rowena Webster (C)	D	R	1.78 m (5 ft 10 in)	80 kg (176 lb)	27 December 1987 (aged 33)	305	2/23	(Australia) UTS Balmain Tigers	
8	Amy Ridge	CB	R	1.86 m (6 ft 1 in)		15 August 1996 (aged 24)	81	0/0	(Australia) UNSW Killer Whales	
9	Zoe Arancini	D	R	1.70 m (5 ft 7 in)	70 kg (154 lb)	14 July 1991 (aged 30)	256	1/6	(Australia) Fremantle Marlins	
10	Lena Mihailović	D	R	1.68 m (5 ft 6 in)		10 August 1996 (aged 24)	44	0/0	(Australia) ACU Cronulla Sharks	
11	Matilda Kearns	CF	R	1.76 m (5 ft 9 in)		2 October 2000 (aged 20)	5	0/0	(Australia) Sydney University Lions	
12	Abby Andrews	D	L			28 November 2000 (aged 20)	5	0/0	(Australia) Queensland Thunder	
13	Gabriella Palm	GK	R	1.82 m (6 ft 0 in)		20 May 1998 (aged 23)	50	0/0	(Australia) Queensland Thunder	
Average				1.78 m (5 ft 10 in)	76 kg (168 lb)	27 years, 283 days	142			

Note: Age as of 23 July 2021
Source: Australia Women | Tokyo 2020 Olympics

=== Canada ===
Canada's final squad was announced on 28 June 2021.

Head coach: David Paradelo

No.	Player	Pos.	L/R	Height	Weight	Date of birth (age)	Apps	OG/ Goals	Club
1	Clara Vulpisi	GK	R	1.72 m (5 ft 8 in)	80 kg (176 lb)	15 July 1998 (aged 23)	53	0/0	(Canada) Montreal Ouest
2	Kelly McKee	CB	R	1.72 m (5 ft 8 in)	75 kg (165 lb)	16 June 1992 (aged 29)	320	0/0	(Canada) Calgary Renegades
3	Axelle Crevier	D	R	1.72 m (5 ft 8 in)	66 kg (146 lb)	22 March 1997 (aged 24)	120	0/0	(Canada) Montreal Ouest
4	Emma Wright	CF	L	1.80 m (5 ft 11 in)	82 kg (181 lb)	16 November 1996 (aged 24)	209	0/0	(Canada) Shadow (Scarborough)
5	Monika Eggens (C)	D	R	1.88 m (6 ft 2 in)	77 kg (170 lb)	25 December 1990 (aged 30)	499	0/0	(Canada) Pacific Storm (Vancouver)
6	Gurpreet Sohi	D	R	1.70 m (5 ft 7 in)	60 kg (132 lb)	20 July 1994 (aged 27)	90	0/0	(Canada) Fraser Valley
7	Joelle Bekhazi	D	R	1.70 m (5 ft 7 in)	65 kg (143 lb)	27 April 1987 (aged 34)	574	0/0	(Canada) Dollard
8	Elyse Lemay-Lavoie	CF	R	1.74 m (5 ft 9 in)	85 kg (187 lb)	12 November 1994 (aged 26)	100	0/0	(Canada) Montreal Ouest
9	Hayley McKelvey	CB	R	1.80 m (5 ft 11 in)	72 kg (159 lb)	11 March 1996 (aged 25)	130	0/0	(Canada) Pacific Storm (Vancouver)
10	Kyra Christmas	D	L	1.82 m (6 ft 0 in)	73 kg (161 lb)	14 March 1997 (aged 24)	99	0/0	(Canada) Calgary Renegades
11	Kindred Paul	CB	R	1.80 m (5 ft 11 in)	72 kg (159 lb)	22 February 1996 (aged 25)	97	0/0	(Canada) Edmonton
12	Shae La Roche	D	R	1.65 m (5 ft 5 in)	68 kg (150 lb)	3 September 1992 (aged 28)	240	0/0	(Canada) Laval
13	Claire Wright	GK	R	1.78 m (5 ft 10 in)	80 kg (176 lb)	2 February 1994 (aged 27)	140	0/0	(Canada) Shadow (Scarborough)
Average				1.76 m (5 ft 9 in)	73 kg (161 lb)	27 years, 4 days	205		

Note: Age as of 23 July 2021
Source: Canada Women | Tokyo 2020 Olympics

=== Netherlands ===
The Netherlands's final squad was announced on 24 June 2021.

Head coach: Arno Havenga

No.	Player	Pos.	L/R	Height	Weight	Date of birth (age)	Apps	OG/ Goals	Club	Ref
1	Joanne Koenders	GK	R	1.78 m (5 ft 10 in)	70 kg (154 lb)	28 February 1997 (aged 24)	65	0/0	(Netherlands) Polar Bears Ede	
2	Maud Megens	FP	R	1.83 m (6 ft 0 in)	70 kg (154 lb)	6 February 1996 (aged 25)	170	0/0	(United States) USC Trojans	
3	Dagmar Genee	FP	R	1.78 m (5 ft 10 in)	70 kg (154 lb)	31 January 1989 (aged 32)	220	0/0	(Netherlands) UZSC Utrecht	
4	Sabrina van der Sloot	FP	R	1.75 m (5 ft 9 in)	62 kg (137 lb)	16 March 1991 (aged 30)	275	0/0	(Spain) Sabadell	
5	Iris Wolves	FP	R	1.80 m (5 ft 11 in)	79 kg (174 lb)	9 May 1994 (aged 27)	80	0/0	(Spain) Mediterrani	
6	Nomi Stomphorst (C)	FP	R	1.72 m (5 ft 8 in)	63 kg (139 lb)	23 August 1992 (aged 28)	275	0/0	(Netherlands) GZC Donk	
7	Kitty Joustra	FP	R	1.77 m (5 ft 10 in)	72 kg (159 lb)	11 January 1998 (aged 23)	93	0/0	(United States) California Golden Bears	
8	Vivian Sevenich	FP	L	1.80 m (5 ft 11 in)	82 kg (181 lb)	28 February 1993 (aged 28)	225	0/0	(Spain) Mataró	
9	Maartje Keuning	FP	R	1.83 m (6 ft 0 in)	73 kg (161 lb)	26 April 1998 (aged 23)	70	0/0	(Spain) Sabadell	
10	Ilse Koolhaas	FP	R	1.83 m (6 ft 0 in)	76 kg (168 lb)	11 June 1997 (aged 24)	95	0/0	(Greece) Glyfada	
11	Simone van de Kraats	FP	L	1.80 m (5 ft 11 in)	72 kg (159 lb)	15 November 2000 (aged 20)	70	0/0	(Spain) Mataró	
12	Brigitte Sleeking	FP	R	1.78 m (5 ft 10 in)	68 kg (150 lb)	19 March 1998 (aged 23)	70	0/0	(Greece) Olympiacos	
13	Debby Willemsz	GK	R	1.78 m (5 ft 10 in)	75 kg (165 lb)	10 May 1994 (aged 27)	170	0/0	(Spain) Mediterrani	
Average				1.79 m (5 ft 10 in)	72 kg (159 lb)	26 years, 37 days	144			

Note: Age as of 23 July 2021
Source: Netherlands Women | Tokyo 2020 Olympics

=== South Africa ===
South Africa's squad was announced on 24 June 2021. Daniela Passoni and Kelsey White were replaced by Hannah Calvert and Nicola Macleod.

Head coach: Delaine Mentoor

No.	Player	Pos.	L/R	Height	Weight	Date of birth (age)	Apps	OG/ Goals	Club	Ref
1	Meghan Maartens	GK	L			8 April 1999 (aged 22)	18	0/0	(South Africa) Madibaz	
2	Yanah Gerber	CF	R			16 March 2001 (aged 20)	15	0/0	(South Africa) MantaRays	
3	Georgie Moir	CB	R			5 December 1997 (aged 23)	22	0/0	(South Africa) Western Warriors	
4	Boati Motau	D	L			25 September 2002 (aged 18)	16	0/0	(South Africa) OJ Eagles	
5	Megan Sileno	CF	R	1.82 m (6 ft 0 in)	82 kg (181 lb)	1 May 1989 (aged 32)	45	0/0	(South Africa) Stingrays	
6	Amica Hallenndorff	D	R	1.64 m (5 ft 5 in)	60 kg (132 lb)	26 October 1992 (aged 28)	49	0/0	(South Africa) Western Warriors	
7	Shakira January	CB	R			15 November 2002 (aged 18)	15	0/0	(South Africa) Tridents	
8	Ashleigh Vaughn	D	R			17 May 1999 (aged 22)	13	0/0	(South Africa) Madibaz	
9	Hannah Muller	D	R			16 November 1999 (aged 21)	44	0/0	(South Africa) Eagles	
10	Jordan Wedderburn (C)	D	R			30 December 2002 (aged 18)	27	0/0	(South Africa) Water Warriors	
11	Chloe Meecham	CB	R			16 February 1999 (aged 22)	55	0/0	(South Africa) High Performance	
12	Nicola Macleod	D	R			14 May 1997 (aged 24)	33	0/0	(South Africa) Stingrays	
13	Hannah Calvert	GK	R			27 November 1997 (aged 23)	17	0/0	(South Africa) Stellenbosch University	
Average						22 years, 321 days	28			

Note: Age as of 23 July 2021
Source: South Africa Women | Tokyo 2020 Olympics

=== Spain ===
Spain's final squad was announced on 9 July 2021.

Head coach: Miki Oca

No.	Player	Pos.	L/R	Height	Weight	Date of birth (age)	Apps	OG/ Goals	Club	Ref
1	Laura Ester	GK	R	1.72 m (5 ft 8 in)	58 kg (128 lb)	22 January 1990 (aged 31)	309	2/0	(Spain) Sabadell	
2	Marta Bach	CB	R	1.76 m (5 ft 9 in)	67 kg (148 lb)	17 February 1993 (aged 28)	232	2/0	(Spain) Mataró	
3	Anni Espar	D	R	1.80 m (5 ft 11 in)	66 kg (146 lb)	8 January 1993 (aged 28)	259	2/22	(Spain) Mataró	
4	Beatriz Ortiz	D	R	1.76 m (5 ft 9 in)	64 kg (141 lb)	21 June 1995 (aged 26)	118	1/6	(Spain) Terrassa	
5	Elena Ruiz	D	R	1.70 m (5 ft 7 in)	66 kg (146 lb)	29 October 2004 (aged 16)	0	0/0	(Spain) Rubí	
6	Irene González	CB	R	1.70 m (5 ft 7 in)	64 kg (141 lb)	23 July 1996 (aged 25)	18	0/0	(Spain) Sabadell	
7	Clara Espar	D	R	1.77 m (5 ft 10 in)	68 kg (150 lb)	29 September 1994 (aged 26)	133	1/0	(Spain) Mediterrani	
8	Pili Peña (C)	D	L	1.75 m (5 ft 9 in)	63 kg (139 lb)	4 April 1986 (aged 35)	433	2/8	(Spain) Terrassa	
9	Judith Forca	D	L	1.73 m (5 ft 8 in)	70 kg (154 lb)	7 June 1996 (aged 25)	116	1/7	(Spain) Sabadell	
10	Roser Tarragó	D	R	1.71 m (5 ft 7 in)	62 kg (137 lb)	25 March 1993 (aged 28)	189	2/20	(Spain) Mediterrani	
11	Maica García	CF	R	1.88 m (6 ft 2 in)	90 kg (198 lb)	17 October 1990 (aged 30)	322	2/20	(Spain) Sabadell	
12	Paula Leitón	CF	R	1.89 m (6 ft 2 in)	98 kg (216 lb)	27 April 2000 (aged 21)	111	1/2	(Spain) Terrassa	
13	Elena Sánchez	GK	R	1.77 m (5 ft 10 in)	64 kg (141 lb)	22 October 1994 (aged 26)	88	0/0	(Spain) Mataró	
Average				1.76 m (5 ft 9 in)	69 kg (152 lb)	26 years, 354 days	179			

Note: Age as of 23 July 2021
Source: Spain Women | Tokyo 2020 Olympics

== Group B ==
=== China ===
Head coach: (Montenegro) Petar Porobić

No.	Player	Pos.	L/R	Height	Weight	Date of birth (age)	Apps	OG/ Goals	Club	Ref
1	Peng Lin	GK	R	1.83 m (6 ft 0 in)	73 kg (161 lb)	4 April 1995 (aged 26)	108	1/0	(China) Hunan	
2	Wang Xinyan	CB	R	1.80 m (5 ft 11 in)	73 kg (161 lb)	26 April 1991 (aged 30)	126	1/2	(China) Shanghai	
3	Mei Xiaohan (C)	CB	R	1.81 m (5 ft 11 in)	100 kg (220 lb)	11 November 1996 (aged 24)	126	1/3	(China) Tianjin	
4	Xiong Dunhan	CF	R	1.79 m (5 ft 10 in)	83 kg (183 lb)	11 November 1998 (aged 22)	126	1/0	(China) Hunan	
5	Niu Guannan	D	R	1.78 m (5 ft 10 in)	68 kg (150 lb)	10 May 1992 (aged 29)	120	1/5	(China) Guangxi	
6	Zhai Ying	D	R	1.72 m (5 ft 8 in)		10 February 1996 (aged 25)	22	0/0	(China) Hunan	
7	Lu Yiwen	D	R	1.81 m (5 ft 11 in)		16 May 1996 (aged 25)	49	0/0	(China) Fujian	
8	Wang Huan	D	R	1.84 m (6 ft 0 in)		8 October 1997 (aged 23)	53	0/0	(China) Shanghai	
9	Deng Zewen	D	R	1.77 m (5 ft 10 in)		6 February 1997 (aged 24)	26	0/0	(China) Hunan	
10	Zhang Danyi	D	R	1.76 m (5 ft 9 in)	74 kg (163 lb)	23 January 1995 (aged 26)	81	0/0	(China) Shanghai	
11	Chen Xiao	CF	R	1.81 m (5 ft 11 in)		11 March 1999 (aged 22)	180	0/0	(China) Shanghai	
12	Zhang Jing	D	L	1.65 m (5 ft 5 in)	62 kg (137 lb)	16 June 1996 (aged 25)	121	1/2	(China) Fujian	
13	Shen Yineng	GK	R	1.88 m (6 ft 2 in)	80 kg (176 lb)	18 January 1995 (aged 26)	61	0/0	(China) Shanghai	
Average				1.79 m (5 ft 10 in)	77 kg (170 lb)	25 years, 210 days	92			

Note: Age as of 23 July 2021
Source: China Women | Tokyo 2020 Olympics

=== Hungary ===
Hungary's final squad was announced on 29 June 2021.

Head coach: Attila Bíró

No.	Player	Pos.	L/R	Height	Weight	Date of birth (age)	Apps	OG/ Goals	Club	Ref
1	Edina Gangl	GK	R	1.81 m (5 ft 11 in)	64 kg (141 lb)	25 June 1990 (aged 31)	167	2/0	(Hungary) UVSE	
2	Dorottya Szilágyi	D	R	1.82 m (6 ft 0 in)	68 kg (150 lb)	10 November 1996 (aged 24)	107	0/0	(Hungary) Dunaújvárosi	
3	Vanda Vályi	D	R	1.81 m (5 ft 11 in)	64 kg (141 lb)	13 August 1999 (aged 21)	70	0/0	(Hungary) Ferencvárosi	
4	Gréta Gurisatti	D	R	1.76 m (5 ft 9 in)	75 kg (165 lb)	14 May 1996 (aged 25)	108	0/0	(Hungary) Dunaújvárosi	
5	Gabriella Szűcs	CB	R	1.83 m (6 ft 0 in)	73 kg (161 lb)	7 March 1988 (aged 33)	286	2/16	(Hungary) UVSE	
6	Rebecca Parkes	CF	R	1.82 m (6 ft 0 in)	83 kg (183 lb)	16 August 1994 (aged 26)	82	0/0	(Hungary) UVSE	
7	Anna Illés	D	R	1.80 m (5 ft 11 in)	70 kg (154 lb)	21 February 1994 (aged 27)	215	1/2	(Hungary) Ferencvárosi	
8	Rita Keszthelyi (C)	D	R	1.78 m (5 ft 10 in)	67 kg (148 lb)	10 December 1991 (aged 29)	291	2/24	(Hungary) UVSE	
9	Dóra Leimeter	D	L	1.75 m (5 ft 9 in)	78 kg (172 lb)	8 May 1996 (aged 25)	78	0/0	(Hungary) Budapesti Vasutas	
10	Anikó Gyöngyössy	CF	R	1.85 m (6 ft 1 in)	98 kg (216 lb)	21 May 1990 (aged 31)	105	0/0	(Hungary) Budapesti Vasutas	
11	Natasa Rybanska	CB	R	1.90 m (6 ft 3 in)	86 kg (190 lb)	10 April 2000 (aged 21)	55	0/0	(Hungary) UVSE	
12	Krisztina Garda	D	R	1.70 m (5 ft 7 in)	84 kg (185 lb)	16 July 1994 (aged 27)	138	1/1	(Hungary) Dunaújvárosi	
13	Alda Magyari	GK	R	1.90 m (6 ft 3 in)	80 kg (176 lb)	19 October 2000 (aged 20)	25	0/0	(Hungary) Dunaújvárosi	
Average				1.81 m (5 ft 11 in)	76 kg (168 lb)	26 years, 216 days	133			

Note: Age as of 23 July 2021
Source: Hungary Women | Tokyo 2020 Olympics

=== Japan ===
Japan's final squad was announced on 19 May 2021.

Head coach: Makihiro Motomiya

No.	Player	Pos.	L/R	Height	Weight	Date of birth (age)	Apps	OG/ Goals	Club	Ref
1	Rikako Miura	GK	R	1.71 m (5 ft 7 in)	61 kg (134 lb)	13 October 1989 (aged 31)	76	0/0	(Japan) Nittai Club	
2	Yumi Arima	D	R	1.73 m (5 ft 8 in)	73 kg (161 lb)	9 September 1997 (aged 23)	45	0/0	(Japan) Fujimura	
3	Akari Inaba	D	R	1.64 m (5 ft 5 in)	60 kg (132 lb)	2 February 1998 (aged 23)	50	0/0	(Japan) Shumei University	
4	Eruna Ura	D	R	1.69 m (5 ft 7 in)	61 kg (134 lb)	14 October 2002 (aged 18)	8	0/0	(Japan) Shumei University	
5	Kaho Iwano	CB	R	1.66 m (5 ft 5 in)	62 kg (137 lb)	6 August 1999 (aged 21)	6	0/0	(Japan) Shumei University	
6	Miku Koide	CF	R	1.72 m (5 ft 8 in)	78 kg (172 lb)	21 May 1992 (aged 29)	33	0/0	(Japan) Bourbon	
7	Maiko Hashida	D	R	1.64 m (5 ft 5 in)	58 kg (128 lb)	23 December 2000 (aged 20)	28	0/0	(Japan) Nippon Sport	
8	Yuki Niizawa (C)	D	L	1.59 m (5 ft 3 in)	56 kg (123 lb)	13 February 1997 (aged 24)	51	0/0	(Japan) Nittai Club	
9	Minori Yamamoto	D	R	1.56 m (5 ft 1 in)	80 kg (176 lb)	14 October 1997 (aged 23)	45	0/0	(Japan) Shumei University	
10	Kako Kawaguchi	D	L	1.59 m (5 ft 3 in)	56 kg (123 lb)	14 July 1999 (aged 22)	6	0/0	(Japan) Nippon Sport	
11	Marina Tokumoto	CB	R	1.64 m (5 ft 5 in)	60 kg (132 lb)	2 February 1996 (aged 25)	65	0/0	(Japan) Toeikai	
12	Kyoko Kudo	D	R	1.65 m (5 ft 5 in)	56 kg (123 lb)	10 February 2001 (aged 20)	6	0/0	(Japan) Nippon Sport	
13	Minami Shioya	GK	R	1.73 m (5 ft 8 in)	68 kg (150 lb)	27 July 1997 (aged 23)	51	0/0	(Japan) Shumei University	
Average				1.66 m (5 ft 5 in)	64 kg (141 lb)	23 years, 302 days	36			

Note: Age as of 23 July 2021
Source: Japan Women | Tokyo 2020 Olympics

=== ROC ===
ROC's final squad was announced on 13 July 2021.

Head coach: Alexandr Gaidukov

No.	Player	Pos.	L/R	Height	Weight	Date of birth (age)	Apps	OG/ Goals	Club	Ref
1	Evgeniia Golovina	GK	R	1.73 m (5 ft 8 in)	68 kg (150 lb)	14 July 1999 (aged 22)	2	0/0	(Russia) Dinamo-Uralochka Zlatoust	
2	Maria Bersneva	D	R	1.68 m (5 ft 6 in)	61 kg (134 lb)	17 December 1998 (aged 22)	20	0/0	(Russia) Dinamo-Uralochka Zlatoust	
3	Ekaterina Prokofyeva (C)	CF	R	1.76 m (5 ft 9 in)	70 kg (154 lb)	13 March 1991 (aged 30)	150	3/20	(Russia) Kinef-Surgutneftegaz	
4	Elvina Karimova	D	R	1.66 m (5 ft 5 in)	62 kg (137 lb)	25 March 1994 (aged 27)	50	1/5	(Russia) Dinamo-Uralochka Zlatoust	
5	Veronika Vakhitova	CB	R	1.78 m (5 ft 10 in)	71 kg (157 lb)	13 June 1998 (aged 23)	60	0/0	(Russia) SKIF-CSP Moskomsporta	
6	Anastasia Fedotova	D	R	1.68 m (5 ft 6 in)	61 kg (134 lb)	30 November 1998 (aged 22)	27	0/0	(Russia) Spartak Volgograd	
7	Alena Serzhantova	D	R	1.73 m (5 ft 8 in)	72 kg (159 lb)	6 May 1998 (aged 23)	25	0/0	(Russia) SKIF-CSP Moskomsporta	
8	Anastasia Simanovich	CB	R	1.74 m (5 ft 9 in)	70 kg (154 lb)	23 January 1995 (aged 26)	100	1/10	(Russia) Kinef-Surgutneftegaz	
9	Anna Timofeeva	CB	R	1.78 m (5 ft 10 in)	87 kg (192 lb)	18 July 1987 (aged 34)	45	1/3	(Russia) Yugra	
10	Evgeniya Soboleva	CB	R	1.80 m (5 ft 11 in)	75 kg (165 lb)	26 August 1988 (aged 32)	120	3/6	(Russia) Kinef-Surgutneftegaz	
11	Evgeniya Ivanova	D	R	1.76 m (5 ft 9 in)	70 kg (154 lb)	26 July 1987 (aged 33)	80	2/16	(Russia) Kinef-Surgutneftegaz	
12	Nadezhda Glyzina	D	R	1.75 m (5 ft 9 in)	68 kg (150 lb)	20 May 1988 (aged 33)	167	3/18	(Russia) Kinef-Surgutneftegaz	
13	Anna Karnaukh	GK	R	1.73 m (5 ft 8 in)	61 kg (134 lb)	31 August 1993 (aged 27)	101	2/0	(Russia) Kinef-Surgutneftegaz	
Average				1.74 m (5 ft 9 in)	69 kg (152 lb)	27 years, 246 days	73			

Note: Age as of 23 July 2021
Source: ROC Women | Tokyo 2020 Olympics

=== United States ===
The United States' final squad was announced on 23 June 2021.

Head coach: Adam Krikorian

No.	Player	Pos.	L/R	Height	Weight	Date of birth (age)	Apps	OG/ Goals	Club	Ref
1	Ashleigh Johnson	GK	R	1.85 m (6 ft 1 in)	81 kg (179 lb)	12 September 1994 (aged 26)	134	1/0	(United States) NYAC	
2	Maddie Musselman	D	R	1.80 m (5 ft 11 in)	65 kg (143 lb)	16 June 1998 (aged 23)	188	1/12	(United States) NYAC	
3	Melissa Seidemann	CF	R	1.83 m (6 ft 0 in)	104 kg (229 lb)	26 June 1990 (aged 31)	320	2/7	(United States) NYAC	
4	Rachel Fattal	D	R	1.73 m (5 ft 8 in)	65 kg (143 lb)	10 December 1993 (aged 27)	224	1/4	(United States) NYAC	
5	Paige Hauschild	D	R	1.80 m (5 ft 11 in)		17 August 1999 (aged 21)	100	0/0	(United States) Santa Barbara 805	
6	Maggie Steffens (C)	D	R	1.73 m (5 ft 8 in)	74 kg (163 lb)	4 June 1993 (aged 28)	318	2/38	(United States) NYAC	
7	Stephania Haralabidis	D	L	1.80 m (5 ft 11 in)		19 May 1995 (aged 26)	78	0/0	(United States) NYAC	
8	Jamie Neushul	D	R	1.68 m (5 ft 6 in)		12 May 1995 (aged 26)	105	0/0	(United States) NYAC	
9	Aria Fischer	CF	R	1.83 m (6 ft 0 in)	78 kg (172 lb)	2 March 1999 (aged 22)	158	1/0	(United States) SET	
10	Kaleigh Gilchrist	D	R	1.75 m (5 ft 9 in)	77 kg (170 lb)	16 May 1992 (aged 29)	201	1/6	(United States) NYAC	
11	Makenzie Fischer	CB	R	1.85 m (6 ft 1 in)	74 kg (163 lb)	29 March 1997 (aged 24)	208	1/7	(United States) SET	
12	Alys Williams	CB	R	1.80 m (5 ft 11 in)		28 May 1994 (aged 27)	178	0/0	(United States) NYAC	
13	Amanda Longan	GK	R	1.88 m (6 ft 2 in)		16 January 1997 (aged 24)	32	0/0	(United States) Santa Barbara 805	
Average				1.79 m (5 ft 10 in)	77 kg (170 lb)	26 years, 18 days	173			

Note: Age as of 23 July 2021
Source: United States Women | Tokyo 2020 Olympics

== Team statistics ==
=== Average age ===
Average age (as of 23 July 2021)
Rk	Average age	Women's team	Confederation	Finish
1	27 years, 283 days	Australia	Oceania – OSA	5th
2	27 years, 246 days	ROC	Europe – LEN	4th
3	27 years, 4 days	Canada	Americas – UANA	7th
3	27 years, 4 days	Netherlands	Europe – LEN	6th
5	26 years, 354 days	Spain	Europe – LEN	2nd
6	26 years, 216 days	Hungary	Europe – LEN	3rd
7	26 years, 18 days	United States	Americas – UANA	1st
8	25 years, 210 days	China	Asia – AASF	8th
9	23 years, 302 days	Japan	Asia – AASF	9th
10	22 years, 321 days	South Africa	Africa – CANA	10th

=== Average height ===
Rk	Average height	Women's team	Confederation	Finish
1	1.81 m (5 ft 11 in)	Hungary	Europe – LEN	3rd
2	1.79 m (5 ft 10 in)	China	Asia – AASF	8th
2	1.79 m (5 ft 10 in)	Netherlands	Europe – LEN	6th
2	1.79 m (5 ft 10 in)	United States	Americas – UANA	1st
5	1.78 m (5 ft 10 in)	Australia	Oceania – OSA	5th
6	1.76 m (5 ft 9 in)	Canada	Americas – UANA	7th
6	1.76 m (5 ft 9 in)	Spain	Europe – LEN	2nd
8	1.75 m (5 ft 9 in)	South Africa	Africa – CANA	10th
9	1.74 m (5 ft 9 in)	ROC	Europe – LEN	4th
10	1.66 m (5 ft 5 in)	Japan	Asia – AASF	9th

=== Number of left-handed players ===
Number of left-handed players (excluding goalkeepers)
Number of left-handers	Women's team	Confederation	Finish
2	Canada	Americas – UANA	7th
2	Japan	Asia – AASF	9th
2	Netherlands	Europe – LEN	6th
2	Spain	Europe – LEN	2nd
1	Australia	Oceania – OSA	5th
1	China	Asia – AASF	8th
1	Hungary	Europe – LEN	3rd
1	South Africa	Africa – CANA	10th
1	United States	Americas – UANA	1st
0	ROC	Europe – LEN	4th

== Player statistics ==
=== Age records ===
Top 10 oldest players (as of 23 July 2021)
Rk	Age	Player	Women's team	Pos	Date of birth
1	35 years, 110 days	Pili Peña	Spain	D	4 April 1986
2	35 years, 98 days	Bronwen Knox	Australia	D	16 April 1986
3	34 years, 87 days	Joelle Bekhazi	Canada	D	27 April 1987
4	34 years, 5 days	Anna Timofeeva	ROC	CB	18 July 1987
5	33 years, 362 days	Evgeniya Ivanova	ROC	D	26 July 1987
6	33 years, 208 days	Rowena Webster	Australia	D	27 December 1987
7	33 years, 138 days	Gabriella Szűcs	Hungary	CB	7 March 1988
8	33 years, 64 days	Nadezhda Glyzina	ROC	D	20 May 1988
9	32 years, 331 days	Evgenia Soboleva	ROC	CB	26 August 1988
10	32 years, 173 days	Dagmar Genee	Netherlands	FP	31 January 1989

Top 10 youngest players (as of 23 July 2021)
Rk	Age	Player	Women's team	Pos	Date of birth
1	16 years, 267 days	Elena Ruiz	Spain	D	29 October 2004
2	18 years, 205 days	Jordan Wedderburn	South Africa	D	30 December 2002
3	18 years, 250 days	Shakira January	South Africa	CB	15 November 2002
4	18 years, 282 days	Eruna Ura	Japan	D	14 October 2002
5	18 years, 301 days	Boati Motau	South Africa	D	25 September 2002
6	20 years, 129 days	Yanah Gerber	South Africa	CF	16 March 2001
7	20 years, 163 days	Kyoko Kudo	Japan	D	10 February 2001
8	20 years, 212 days	Maiko Hashida	Japan	D	23 December 2000
9	20 years, 237 days	Abby Andrews	Australia	D	28 November 2000
10	20 years, 250 days	Simone van de Kraats	Netherlands	FP	15 November 2000

== Coach statistics ==
=== Age ===
Legend

- Head coach – Female head coach

Age of head coaches (as of 23 July 2021)
Rk	Age	Head coach	Nationality	Date of birth	Women's team
1	64 years, 56 days	Petar Porobić	Montenegro	28 May 1957	China
2	55 years, 75 days	Attila Bíró	Hungary	9 May 1966	Hungary
3	52 years, 204 days	Makihiro Motomiya	Japan	31 December 1968	Japan
4	51 years, 99 days	Miki Oca	Spain	15 April 1970	Spain
5	47 years, 194 days	Alexandr Gaidukov	Russia	10 January 1974	ROC
6	47 years, 149 days	Predrag Mihailović	Australia	24 February 1974	Australia
7	47 years, 1 day	Adam Krikorian	United States	22 July 1974	United States
8	46 years, 251 days	Arno Havenga	Netherlands	14 November 1974	Netherlands
9	35 years, 289 days	David Paradelo	Canada	7 October 1985	Canada
10	28 years, 58 days	Delaine Mentoor	South Africa	26 May 1993	South Africa

== See also ==
- Water polo at the 2020 Summer Olympics – Men's team rosters

== Sources ==
- Water Polo – Athlete Profiles | Tokyo 2020 Olympics
- Water Polo – Olympic Reports | Tokyo 2020 Olympics
- Water Polo – Official Results Book | Tokyo 2020 Olympics (archive)
- Water Polo – Team Rosters | Tokyo 2020 Olympics
  - Australia, Canada, China, Hungary, Japan, Netherlands, ROC, South Africa, Spain, United States
