= South Africa at the 2019 World Aquatics Championships =

- Flag of South Africa
- World Aquatics code: RSA
- National federation: Swimming South Africa
- Website: swimsa.org

in Gwangju, South Korea
- Competitors: 64 in 5 sports
- Medals Ranked 15th: Gold 1 Silver 1 Bronze 2 Total 4

World Aquatics Championships appearances
- 1973; 1975; 1978; 1982; 1986; 1991; 1994; 1998; 2001; 2003; 2005; 2007; 2009; 2011; 2013; 2015; 2017; 2019; 2022; 2023; 2024; 2025

South Africa competed at the 2019 World Aquatics Championships in Gwangju, South Korea from 12 to 28 July.

== Medalists ==
| Medal | Name | Sport | Event | Date |
|---|---|---|---|---|
| Gold | Zane Waddell | Swimming | Men's 50 metre backstroke | July 28 |
| Silver | Tatjana Schoenmaker | Swimming | Women's 200 metre breaststroke | July 26 |
| Bronze | Chad Le Clos | Swimming | Men's 200 metre butterfly | July 24 |
| Bronze | Chad Le Clos | Swimming | Men's 100 metre butterfly | July 27 |

== Artistic swimming ==
South Africa has entered 12 artistic swimmers.

Women

| Athlete | Event | Preliminaries | | Final | |
| Athlete | Event | Points | Rank | Points | Rank |
|---|---|---|---|---|---|
| Emma Manners-Wood; Laura Strugnell | Duet technical routine | 65.4588 | 42 | did not advance | |
| Emma Manners-Wood; Laura Strugnell | Duet free routine | 67.3333 | 40 | did not advance | |
| Faith Adonis; Emma Manners-Wood; Courtney Musson; Nina Smith; Laura Strugnell; Nadine Vaarland; Tayla-Jade van Huyssteen; Sarah Williams; Giulia Torino (R); Shannon Whyte (R) | Team free routine | 67.1333 | 26 | did not advance | |
| Faith Adonis; Emma Manners-Wood; Courtney Musson; Nina Smith; Laura Strugnell; Giulia Torino; Nadine Vaarland; Tayla-Jade van Huyssteen; Shannon Whyte; Sarah Williams; Chloe Dundas-Starr (R); Sabrina Otto (R) | Free routine combination | 66.7000 | 14 | did not advance | |

Legend: (R) = Reserve Athlete

== Diving ==
South Africa has entered two divers.

Women

| Athlete | Event | Preliminaries | | Semifinals | | Final | |
| Athlete | Event | Points | Rank | Points | Rank | Points | Rank |
|---|---|---|---|---|---|---|---|
| Julia Vincent | 1 m springboard | 241.35 | 4 Q | —N/a | | 236.40 | 12 |
| Julia Vincent | 3 m springboard | 268.30 | 16 Q | 275.85 | 16 | did not advance | |
| Micaela Bouter | 3 m springboard | 233.15 | 35 | did not advance | | | |

== Open water swimming ==
South Africa qualified four male and two female open water swimmers.

Men

| Athlete | Event | Time | Rank |
|---|---|---|---|
| Chad Ho | Men's 10 km | 1:49:37.9 | 23 |
| Danie Marais | Men's 10 km | 1:50:14.2 | 30 |
| Michael McGlynn | Men's 5 km | 53:42.4 | 22 |
| Christopher McGlynn | Men's 5 km | 54:06.2 | 43 |

Women

| Athlete | Event | Time | Rank |
|---|---|---|---|
| Robyn Kinghorn | Women's 5 km | 1:01:50.0 | 42 |
| Robyn Kinghorn | Women's 10 km | 2:03:05.1 | 46 |
| Michelle Weber | Women's 5 km | 59:54.6 | 32 |
| Michelle Weber | Women's 10 km | 1:56:25.8 | 31 |

Mixed

| Athlete | Event | Time | Rank |
|---|---|---|---|
| Michelle Weber; Robyn Kinghorn; Chad Ho; Danie Marais | Team | 56:52.9 | 15 |

== Swimming ==
South Africa has entered 18 swimmers.

Men

| Athlete | Event | Heat | | Semifinal | | Final | |
| Athlete | Event | Time | Rank | Time | Rank | Time | Rank |
|---|---|---|---|---|---|---|---|
| Alaric Basson | 200 m breaststroke | 2:13.73 | 32 | did not advance | | | |
| Ryan Coetzee | 50 m butterfly | 24.13 | 36 | did not advance | | | |
| Ryan Coetzee | 100 m butterfly | 53.46 | 30 | did not advance | | | |
| Michael Houlie | 50 m breaststroke | 27.41 | 19 | did not advance | | | |
| Michael Houlie | 100 m breaststroke | 1:01.18 | =29 | did not advance | | | |
| Chad le Clos | 100 m freestyle | DNS | | did not advance | | | |
| Chad le Clos | 100 m butterfly | 51.58 | 4 Q | 51.40 | 4 Q | 51.16 | 3rd place, bronze medalist(s) |
| Chad le Clos | 200 m butterfly | 1:56.17 | 5 Q | 1:55.88 | 5 Q | 1:54.15 | 3rd place, bronze medalist(s) |
| Christopher Reid | 100 m backstroke | 54.12 | 19 | did not advance | | | |
| Christopher Reid | 200 m backstroke | 1:58.44 | 20 | did not advance | | | |
| Ayrton Sweeney | 400 m individual medley | 4:20.32 | 19 | —N/a | | did not advance | |
| Bradley Tandy | 50 m freestyle | 22.24 | 18 | did not advance | | | |
| Eben Vorster | 200 m freestyle | 1:51.70 | 44 | did not advance | | | |
| Eben Vorster | 200 m individual medley | 2:05.69 | 39 | did not advance | | | |
| Zane Waddell | 50 m backstroke | 24.84 | 4 Q | 24.72 | 5 Q | 24.43 | 1st place, gold medalist(s) |
| Christopher Reid; Michael Houlie; Chad le Clos; Ryan Coetzee | 4 × 100 m medley relay | 3:38.18 | 23 | —N/a | | did not advance | |

Women

| Athlete | Event | Heat | | Semifinal | | Final | |
| Athlete | Event | Time | Rank | Time | Rank | Time | Rank |
|---|---|---|---|---|---|---|---|
| Kaylene Corbett | 200 m breaststroke | 2:24.83 | 3 Q | 2:24.18 | 8 Q | 2:26.62 | 8 |
| Duné Coetzee | 400 m freestyle | 4:14.39 | 23 | —N/a | | did not advance | |
| Duné Coetzee | 800 m freestyle | 8:47.97 | 24 | —N/a | | did not advance | |
| Duné Coetzee | 200 m butterfly | 2:11.92 | 20 | did not advance | | | |
| Erin Gallagher | 50 m freestyle | 25.48 | 27 | did not advance | | | |
| Erin Gallagher | 100 m freestyle | 54.64 | 20 | did not advance | | | |
| Erin Gallagher | 50 m butterfly | 26.45 | 19 | did not advance | | | |
| Erin Gallagher | 100 m butterfly | 59.21 | 23 | did not advance | | | |
| Rebecca Meder | 200 m freestyle | 2:02.70 | 30 | did not advance | | | |
| Rebecca Meder | 200 m individual medley | 2:15.96 | 22 | did not advance | | | |
| Rebecca Meder | 400 m individual medley | 4:53.99 | 22 | —N/a | | did not advance | |
| Tatjana Schoenmaker | 50 m breaststroke | 31.40 | 17 | did not advance | | | |
| Tatjana Schoenmaker | 100 m breaststroke | 1:06.76 | 4 Q | 1:06.61 | 5 Q | 1:06.60 | 6 |
| Tatjana Schoenmaker | 200 m breaststroke | 2:24.66 | 2 Q | 2:21.79 AF | 2 Q | 2:22.52 | 2nd place, silver medalist(s) |
| Nathania van Niekerk | 200 m backstroke | 2:13.37 | 26 | did not advance | | | |
| Mariella Venter | 100 m backstroke | 1:02.95 | 39 | did not advance | | | |
| Erin Gallagher; Tayla Lovemore; Emma Chelius; Rebecca Meder | 4 × 100 m freestyle relay | 3:43.35 AF | 18 | —N/a | | did not advance | |
| Mariella Venter; Tatjana Schoenmaker; Tayla Lovemore; Emma Chelius | 4 × 100 m medley relay | 4:05.12 | 17 | —N/a | | did not advance | |

Mixed

| Athlete | Event | Heat | | Final | |
| Athlete | Event | Time | Rank | Time | Rank |
|---|---|---|---|---|---|
| Christopher Reid; Ryan Coetzee; Emma Chelius; Tayla Lovemore | 4 × 100 m mixed freestyle relay | 3:32.89 | 17 | did not advance | |
| Christopher Reid; Tatjana Schoenmaker; Ryan Coetzee; Erin Gallagher | 4 × 100 m mixed medley relay | 3:49.90 AF | 15 | did not advance | |

== Water polo ==
=== Men's tournament ===
Team roster

- Madi Lwazi
- Etienne Le Roux (C)
- Timothy Rezelman
- Nardus Badenhorst
- Ethan Coryndon-Baker
- Sven van Zyl
- Jason Evezard
- Nicholas Rodda
- Dylan Cronje
- Mark Spencer
- Liam Neill
- Donn Stewart
- Keegan Clark
- Coach: Paul Martin

Group C

| Pos | Team | Pld | W | D | L | GF | GA | GD | Pts | Qualification |
|---|---|---|---|---|---|---|---|---|---|---|
| 1 | Hungary | 3 | 3 | 0 | 0 | 60 | 20 | +40 | 6 | Quarterfinals |
| 2 | Spain | 3 | 2 | 0 | 1 | 57 | 19 | +38 | 4 | Playoffs |
| 3 | South Africa | 3 | 0 | 1 | 2 | 16 | 54 | −38 | 1 | Playoffs |
| 4 | New Zealand | 3 | 0 | 1 | 2 | 15 | 55 | −40 | 1 | |

Source: Sportresult
Rules for classification: 1) points; 2) head-to-head points; 3) head-to-head goal difference; 4) head-to-head number of goals scored; 5) Goal difference.

| 15 July 2019; 16:30 | Report | South Africa | 3–23 | Spain | Nambu University Aquatics Center, Gwangju; Referees: John Waldow (NZL), Vojin Putniković (SRB) |
| 15 July 2019; 16:30 | Report | Score by quarters: 1–6, 1–5, 1–4, 0–8 | | | Nambu University Aquatics Center, Gwangju; Referees: John Waldow (NZL), Vojin Putniković (SRB) |
| 15 July 2019; 16:30 | Report | Rodda 2 | Goals | Mallarach 5 | Nambu University Aquatics Center, Gwangju; Referees: John Waldow (NZL), Vojin Putniković (SRB) |

| 17 July 2019; 12:30 | Report | South Africa | 8–8 | New Zealand | Nambu University Aquatics Center, Gwangju; Referees: Georgios Stavridis (GRE), Stanko Ivanovski (MNE) |
| 17 July 2019; 12:30 | Report | Score by quarters: 2–0, 2–2, 2–4, 2–2 | | | Nambu University Aquatics Center, Gwangju; Referees: Georgios Stavridis (GRE), Stanko Ivanovski (MNE) |
| 17 July 2019; 12:30 | Report | three players 2 | Goals | Small 2 | Nambu University Aquatics Center, Gwangju; Referees: Georgios Stavridis (GRE), Stanko Ivanovski (MNE) |

| 19 July 2019; 08:30 | Report | South Africa | 5–23 | Hungary | Nambu University Aquatics Center, Gwangju; Referees: Michael Goldenberg (USA), An Jin-yong (KOR) |
| 19 July 2019; 08:30 | Report | Score by quarters: 1–5, 2–5, 0–8, 2–5 | | | Nambu University Aquatics Center, Gwangju; Referees: Michael Goldenberg (USA), An Jin-yong (KOR) |
| 19 July 2019; 08:30 | Report | Badenhorst 2 | Goals | Zalánki 5 | Nambu University Aquatics Center, Gwangju; Referees: Michael Goldenberg (USA), An Jin-yong (KOR) |

Playoffs

| 21 July 2019; 18:30 | Report | South Africa | 5–25 | Germany | Nambu University Aquatics Center, Gwangju; Referees: Jaume Teixidó (ESP), Juan Menéndez (CUB) |
| 21 July 2019; 18:30 | Report | Score by quarters: 2–5, 0–6, 1–9, 2–5 | | | Nambu University Aquatics Center, Gwangju; Referees: Jaume Teixidó (ESP), Juan Menéndez (CUB) |
| 21 July 2019; 18:30 | Report | five players 1 | Goals | Gielen 6 | Nambu University Aquatics Center, Gwangju; Referees: Jaume Teixidó (ESP), Juan Menéndez (CUB) |

9th–12th place semifinals

| 23 July 2019; 12:30 | Report | United States | 20–3 | South Africa | Nambu University Aquatics Center, Gwangju; Referees: Jeremy Cheng (SGP), Daniel Flahive (AUS) |
| 23 July 2019; 12:30 | Report | Score by quarters: 5–0, 8–1, 5–2, 2–0 | | | Nambu University Aquatics Center, Gwangju; Referees: Jeremy Cheng (SGP), Daniel Flahive (AUS) |
| 23 July 2019; 12:30 | Report | three players 4 | Goals | three players 1 | Nambu University Aquatics Center, Gwangju; Referees: Jeremy Cheng (SGP), Daniel Flahive (AUS) |

11th place game

| 25 July 2019; 09:30 | Report | Japan | 15–5 | South Africa | Nambu University Aquatics Center, Gwangju; Referees: Viktor Salnichenko (KAZ), Juan Menéndez (CUB) |
| 25 July 2019; 09:30 | Report | Score by quarters: 5–1, 4–1, 3–2, 3–1 | | | Nambu University Aquatics Center, Gwangju; Referees: Viktor Salnichenko (KAZ), Juan Menéndez (CUB) |
| 25 July 2019; 09:30 | Report | Shimizu, Inaba 3 | Goals | Evezard 2 | Nambu University Aquatics Center, Gwangju; Referees: Viktor Salnichenko (KAZ), Juan Menéndez (CUB) |

=== Women's tournament ===
Team roster

- Lauren Nixon
- Yanah Gerber
- Nthatisi Mota
- Emma Joubert
- Georgia Moir
- Amica Hallendorff (C)
- Lucy Miszewski
- Kate Hinrichs
- Jordan Wedderburn
- Nicola Macleod
- Chloe Meecham
- Christine Abrahamse
- Zanne Smit
- Coach: Pierre le Roux

Group A

| Pos | Team | Pld | W | D | L | GF | GA | GD | Pts | Qualification |
|---|---|---|---|---|---|---|---|---|---|---|
| 1 | United States | 3 | 3 | 0 | 0 | 60 | 13 | +47 | 6 | Quarterfinals |
| 2 | Netherlands | 3 | 2 | 0 | 1 | 57 | 18 | +39 | 4 | Playoffs |
| 3 | New Zealand | 3 | 1 | 0 | 2 | 26 | 41 | −15 | 2 | Playoffs |
| 4 | South Africa | 3 | 0 | 0 | 3 | 5 | 76 | −71 | 0 | |

Source: Sportresult
Rules for classification: 1) points; 2) head-to-head points; 3) head-to-head goal difference; 4) head-to-head number of goals scored; 5) Goal difference.

| 14 July 2019; 08:30 | Report | South Africa | 0–33 | Netherlands | Nambu University Aquatics Center, Gwangju; Referees: Viktor Salnichenko (KAZ), Ni Shi Wei (CHN) |
| 14 July 2019; 08:30 | Report | Score by quarters: 0–7, 0–10, 0–9, 0–7 | | | Nambu University Aquatics Center, Gwangju; Referees: Viktor Salnichenko (KAZ), Ni Shi Wei (CHN) |
| 14 July 2019; 08:30 | Report | | Goals | Van de Kraats 7 | Nambu University Aquatics Center, Gwangju; Referees: Viktor Salnichenko (KAZ), Ni Shi Wei (CHN) |

| 16 July 2019; 20:30 | Report | South Africa | 4–17 | New Zealand | Nambu University Aquatics Center, Gwangju; Referees: Alessandro Severo (ITA), Daniel Flahive (AUS) |
| 16 July 2019; 20:30 | Report | Score by quarters: 0–6, 0–2, 2–6, 2–3 | | | Nambu University Aquatics Center, Gwangju; Referees: Alessandro Severo (ITA), Daniel Flahive (AUS) |
| 16 July 2019; 20:30 | Report | Hallendorff 2 | Goals | Doyle, McDowall 4 | Nambu University Aquatics Center, Gwangju; Referees: Alessandro Severo (ITA), Daniel Flahive (AUS) |

| 18 July 2019; 16:30 | Report | South Africa | 1–26 | United States | Nambu University Aquatics Center, Gwangju; Referees: Alessandro Severo (ITA), An Jin-yong (KOR) |
| 18 July 2019; 16:30 | Report | Score by quarters: 0–7, 1–8, 0–6, 0–5 | | | Nambu University Aquatics Center, Gwangju; Referees: Alessandro Severo (ITA), An Jin-yong (KOR) |
| 18 July 2019; 16:30 | Report | Meecham 1 | Goals | Musselman 5 | Nambu University Aquatics Center, Gwangju; Referees: Alessandro Severo (ITA), An Jin-yong (KOR) |

13th–16th place semifinals

| 20 July 2019; 10:30 | Report | South Africa | 26–3 | South Korea | Nambu University Aquatics Center, Gwangju; Referees: Arkadiy Voevodin (RUS), Kunihiro Sato (JPN) |
| 20 July 2019; 10:30 | Report | Score by quarters: 7–1, 4–0, 7–1, 8–1 | | | Nambu University Aquatics Center, Gwangju; Referees: Arkadiy Voevodin (RUS), Kunihiro Sato (JPN) |
| 20 July 2019; 10:30 | Report | three players 4 | Goals | three players 1 | Nambu University Aquatics Center, Gwangju; Referees: Arkadiy Voevodin (RUS), Kunihiro Sato (JPN) |

13th place game

| 22 July 2019; 09:30 | Report | South Africa | 2–21 | Japan | Nambu University Aquatics Center, Gwangju; Referees: John Waldow (NZL), Ni Shi Wei (CHN) |
| 22 July 2019; 09:30 | Report | Score by quarters: 0–4, 1–4, 1–6, 0–7 | | | Nambu University Aquatics Center, Gwangju; Referees: John Waldow (NZL), Ni Shi Wei (CHN) |
| 22 July 2019; 09:30 | Report | Moir, Hallendorff 1 | Goals | Arima 5 | Nambu University Aquatics Center, Gwangju; Referees: John Waldow (NZL), Ni Shi Wei (CHN) |
