= Water polo at the 2017 World Aquatics Championships – Men's team rosters =

These are the rosters of all participating teams at the men's water polo tournament at the 2017 World Aquatics Championships in Budapest, Hungary.

Abbreviations
Pos.	Position	№	Cap number
CF	Centre forward	CB	Centre back
D	Defense	GK	Goalkeeper

== Group A ==
=== Montenegro ===
The following is the Montenegrin roster in the men's water polo tournament of the 2017 World Aquatics Championships.

Head coach: Vladimir Gojković

№	Name	Pos.	Height	Weight	L/R	Date of birth	2016/17 club
1	Dejan Lazović	GK	1.98 m (6 ft 6 in)	97 kg (214 lb)	R	8 February 1990	(Italy) Sport Management
2	Draško Brguljan	D	1.94 m (6 ft 4 in)	91 kg (201 lb)	R	27 December 1984	(Hungary) Orvosegyetem
3	Bojan Banićević	CF	1.87 m (6 ft 2 in)	91 kg (201 lb)	R	9 March 1993	(Montenegro) Jadran Herceg Novi
4	Marko Petković	D			R	3 March 1989	(Montenegro) Jadran Herceg Novi
5	Darko Brguljan	D	1.82 m (6 ft 0 in)	96 kg (212 lb)	R	5 November 1990	(Germany) Waspo Hannover
6	Aleksandar Radović	D	1.81 m (5 ft 11 in)	98 kg (216 lb)	R	24 February 1987	(Germany) Waspo Hannover
7	Dragan Drašković	D			R	1 September 1988	(Serbia) Crvena zvezda
8	Aleksa Ukropina	D	1.96 m (6 ft 5 in)	91 kg (201 lb)	L	28 September 1998	(Montenegro) Jadran Herceg Novi
9	Đuro Radović	D	1.91 m (6 ft 3 in)	85 kg (187 lb)	L	20 February 1999	(Montenegro) Jadran Herceg Novi
10	Saša Mišić	CF	1.96 m (6 ft 5 in)	106 kg (234 lb)	R	27 March 1987	(Hungary) Miskolc
11	Uroš Čučković	CF	2.00 m (6 ft 7 in)	101 kg (223 lb)	R	25 April 1990	(Hungary) Eger
12	Nikola Murišić	CF	1.88 m (6 ft 2 in)	102 kg (225 lb)	R	16 August 1992	(Romania) Steaua București
13	Miloš Šćepanović (c)	GK	1.85 m (6 ft 1 in)	90 kg (198 lb)	R	9 October 1982	(Montenegro) Jadran Herceg Novi

=== Brazil ===
The following is the Brazilian roster in the men's water polo tournament of the 2017 World Aquatics Championships.

Head coach: Ângelo Coelho

№	Name	Pos.	Height	Weight	L/R	Date of birth	2016/17 club
1	Slobodan Soro (c)	GK	1.97 m (6 ft 6 in)	91 kg (201 lb)	R	23 December 1978	(Brazil) Botafogo
2	Anderson Cruz	D	1.86 m (6 ft 1 in)	88 kg (194 lb)	L	23 August 1991	(Brazil) Paulistano
3	Almeida Guilherme	CF	1.94 m (6 ft 4 in)	91 kg (201 lb)	R	10 January 1990	
4	Gustavo Coutinho	D	1.84 m (6 ft 0 in)	88 kg (194 lb)	R	11 December 1991	(Brazil) Paulistano
5	Ricardo Silva	CF	1.85 m (6 ft 1 in)	87 kg (192 lb)	R	24 March 1998	
6	Ricardo Guimarães	CF	1.85 m (6 ft 1 in)	89 kg (196 lb)	R	10 February 1992	
7	Pedro Stellet	CF	1.87 m (6 ft 2 in)	90 kg (198 lb)	R	17 August 1996	
8	Mateus Stellet	D	1.80 m (5 ft 11 in)	80 kg (176 lb)	R	26 January 2000	
9	Bernardo Rocha	CF	1.88 m (6 ft 2 in)	96 kg (212 lb)	R	3 July 1989	
10	Heitor Carrulo	CF	1.81 m (5 ft 11 in)	96 kg (212 lb)	R	28 January 1989	
11	Gustavo Guimarães	D	1.86 m (6 ft 1 in)	89 kg (196 lb)	R	24 January 1994	
12	Roberto Freitas	D	1.93 m (6 ft 4 in)	90 kg (198 lb)	L	3 April 1997	
13	Leonardo Silva	GK	1.97 m (6 ft 6 in)	98 kg (216 lb)	R	23 November 1996	

=== Canada ===
The following is the Canadian roster in the men's water polo tournament of the 2017 World Aquatics Championships.

Head coach: (Italy) Giuseppe Porzio

№	Name	Pos.	Height	Weight	L/R	Date of birth	2016/17 club
1	Milan Radenović	GK	2.00 m (6 ft 7 in)	91 kg (201 lb)	R	24 August 1993	(Canada) Maverick
2	Gaelan Patterson	D			R	30 April 1996	(Canada) Pacific Storm
3	Jeremie Blanchard	CF			R	15 June 1997	(Canada) CAMO Roadrunners
4	Nicolas Constantin-Bicari (c)	CF	1.95 m (6 ft 5 in)	110 kg (243 lb)	R	5 December 1991	(France) Marseille
5	Matt Halajian	D	1.97 m (6 ft 6 in)	90 kg (198 lb)	R	11 February 1995	(Canada) Fraser Valley
6	Scott Robinson	D	1.90 m (6 ft 3 in)	90 kg (198 lb)	R	8 May 1991	(Italy) Acquachiara
7	Reuel D'Souza	D			R	10 March 1999	(Canada) Pacific Storm
8	David Lapins	D	1.93 m (6 ft 4 in)	99 kg (218 lb)	R	30 June 1994	(Canada) Ottawa Titans
9	Dusan Radojcic	CF	1.87 m (6 ft 2 in)	96 kg (212 lb)	R	31 January 1993	(Canada) Maverick
10	Aria Soleimanipak	D			R	15 August 1997	(Canada) Pacific Storm
11	George Torakis	CF	1.94 m (6 ft 4 in)	97 kg (214 lb)	R	11 December 1989	(Greece) Panathinaikos
12	Devon Thumwood	D			R	13 March 1994	(United States) Pacific Tigers
13	Robin Randall	GK			R	1 May 1980	

=== Kazakhstan ===
The following is the Kazakhstan roster in the men's water polo tournament of the 2017 World Aquatics Championships.

Head coach: (Serbia) Nemanja Knežević

№	Name	Pos.	Height	Weight	L/R	Date of birth	2016/17 club
1	Madikhan Makhmetov	GK	1.78 m (5 ft 10 in)	77 kg (170 lb)	R	3 March 1993	
2	Yevgeniy Medvedev (c)	D	1.86 m (6 ft 1 in)	85 kg (187 lb)	R	9 August 1985	
3	Stanislav Shvedov	D			R	24 November 1998	
4	Roman Pilipenko	CF	1.87 m (6 ft 2 in)	96 kg (212 lb)	R	24 December 1987	
5	Altay Altayev	CF			R	14 February 1996	
6	Alexey Shmider	D	1.83 m (6 ft 0 in)	86 kg (190 lb)	R	19 March 1990	
7	Murat Shakenov	D	1.83 m (6 ft 0 in)	80 kg (176 lb)	R	23 September 1990	
8	Yulian Verdesh	CF			R	19 June 1996	
9	Rustam Ukumanov	D	1.92 m (6 ft 4 in)	95 kg (209 lb)	R	22 March 1986	
10	Mikhail Ruday	CF	1.92 m (6 ft 4 in)	100 kg (220 lb)	R	4 May 1988	
11	Ravil Manafov	CF	1.94 m (6 ft 4 in)	100 kg (220 lb)	R	22 June 1985	
12	Bolat Turlykhanov	CF			R	23 April 1994	
13	Valeriy Shlemov	GK	1.87 m (6 ft 2 in)	80 kg (176 lb)	R	20 September 1995	

== Group B ==
=== Italy ===
The following is the Italian roster in the men's water polo tournament of the 2017 World Aquatics Championships.

Head coach: Alessandro Campagna

№	Name	Pos.	Height	Weight	L/R	Date of birth	2016/17 club
1	Stefano Tempesti	GK	2.05 m (6 ft 9 in)	97 kg (214 lb)	R	9 June 1979	(Italy) Pro Recco
2	Francesco Di Fulvio	D	1.88 m (6 ft 2 in)	82 kg (181 lb)	R	15 August 1993	(Italy) Pro Recco
3	Niccolò Gitto	CF	1.89 m (6 ft 2 in)	76 kg (168 lb)	R	12 October 1986	(Italy) Sport Management
4	Pietro Figlioli (c)	D	1.92 m (6 ft 4 in)	97 kg (214 lb)	R	29 May 1984	(Italy) Pro Recco
5	Nicholas Presciutti	CF	1.90 m (6 ft 3 in)	90 kg (198 lb)	R	14 December 1993	(Italy) Brescia
6	Cristiano Mirarchi	D			R	11 July 1991	(Italy) Sport Management
7	Alessandro Nora	D			L	24 May 1987	(Italy) Brescia
8	Andrea Fondelli	D	1.87 m (6 ft 2 in)	90 kg (198 lb)	L	24 February 1994	(Italy) Pro Recco
9	Vincenzo Renzuto Iodice	D	1.85 m (6 ft 1 in)	80 kg (176 lb)	R	8 April 1993	(Italy) Posillipo
10	Michaël Bodegas	CF			R	3 May 1987	(Italy) Pro Recco
11	Matteo Aicardi	CF	1.92 m (6 ft 4 in)	104 kg (229 lb)	R	19 April 1986	(Italy) Pro Recco
12	Zeno Bertoli	CF			R	22 December 1988	(Italy) Brescia
13	Goran Volarević	GK			R	2 April 1977	(Italy) Pro Recco

=== Hungary ===
The following is the Hungarian roster in the men's water polo tournament of the 2017 World Aquatics Championships.

Head coach: Tamás Märcz

№	Name	Pos.	Height	Weight	L/R	Date of birth	2016/17 club
1	Viktor Nagy	GK	1.98 m (6 ft 6 in)	100 kg (220 lb)	R	24 July 1984	(Hungary) Szolnoki Dózsa
2	Béla Török	CF	2.02 m (6 ft 8 in)	99 kg (218 lb)	R	23 March 1990	(Hungary) Budapesti VSC
3	Krisztián Manhercz	D	1.85 m (6 ft 1 in)	84 kg (185 lb)	R	6 February 1997	(Hungary) Szeged
4	Gergő Zalánki	D			L	26 February 1995	(Hungary) Orvosegyetem
5	Márton Vámos	D	1.99 m (6 ft 6 in)	105 kg (231 lb)	L	24 June 1992	(Hungary) Szolnoki Dózsa
6	Norbert Hosnyánszky	D	1.96 m (6 ft 5 in)	101 kg (223 lb)	R	4 March 1984	(Hungary) Eger
7	Ádám Decker	CF	2.03 m (6 ft 8 in)	110 kg (243 lb)	R	29 February 1984	(Hungary) Eger
8	Miklós Gór-Nagy	CF	1.92 m (6 ft 4 in)	100 kg (220 lb)	R	24 February 1994	(Hungary) Orvosegyetem
9	Balázs Erdélyi	D	1.96 m (6 ft 5 in)	94 kg (207 lb)	R	16 February 1990	(Hungary) Eger
10	Dénes Varga (c)	D	1.93 m (6 ft 4 in)	97 kg (214 lb)	R	29 March 1987	(Hungary) Szolnoki Dózsa
11	Tamás Mezei	CF			L	14 September 1990	(Hungary) Szolnoki Dózsa
12	Balázs Hárai	CF	2.02 m (6 ft 8 in)	110 kg (243 lb)	R	5 April 1987	(Hungary) Eger
13	Attila Decker	GK	1.97 m (6 ft 6 in)	78 kg (172 lb)	R	25 August 1987	(Hungary) Bp. Honvéd

=== Australia ===
The following is the Australian roster in the men's water polo tournament of the 2017 World Aquatics Championships.

Head coach: (Croatia) Elvis Fatović

№	Name	Pos.	Height	Weight	L/R	Date of birth	2016/17 club
1	Edward Slade	GK			R	28 March 1991	(Australia) Fremantle Mariners
2	Timothy Putt	CF			R	6 November 1998	(Australia) UWA Torpedoes
3	George Ford	CF	1.92 m (6 ft 4 in)	95 kg (209 lb)	R	24 February 1993	(Australia) UWA Torpedoes
4	Joe Kayes	CF	1.99 m (6 ft 6 in)	115 kg (254 lb)	R	3 January 1991	(Australia) Cronulla Sharks
5	Nathan Power	CF	2.00 m (6 ft 7 in)	104 kg (229 lb)	R	13 February 1993	(Australia) UNSW Wests Magpies
6	Lachlan Edwards	CF			R	6 February 1995	(Australia) Victorian Seals
7	Jarrod Gilchrist	D	1.90 m (6 ft 3 in)	93 kg (205 lb)	R	13 June 1990	(Australia) UNSW Wests Magpies
8	Aaron Younger (c)	D	1.93 m (6 ft 4 in)	100 kg (220 lb)	R	25 September 1991	(Hungary) Szolnoki Dózsa
9	Andrew Ford	D			R	21 April 1995	(Australia) UWA Torpedoes
10	James Fannon	D			R	28 March 1991	(Australia) Fremantle Mariners
11	Lachlan Hollis	D			R	2 June 1989	(Australia) UNSW Wests Magpies
12	Nicolas Brooks	D			L	12 October 1995	(Australia) Cronulla Sharks
13	Anthony Hrysanthos	GK			R	28 November 1995	(Australia) Sydney Uni Lions

=== France ===
The following is the French roster in the men's water polo tournament of the 2017 World Aquatics Championships.

Head coach: (Croatia) Hrestak Hrvoje

№	Name	Pos.	Height	Weight	L/R	Date of birth	2016/17 club
1	Rémi Garsau	GK	1.90 m (6 ft 3 in)	92 kg (203 lb)	R	19 July 1984	(France) Olympic Nice
2	Rémi Saudadier	CF	1.98 m (6 ft 6 in)	95 kg (209 lb)	R	20 March 1986	(Germany) Spandau 04
3	Igor Kovačević	D	1.90 m (6 ft 3 in)	91 kg (201 lb)	R	3 November 1988	(France) Marseille
4	Logan Piot	CF	1.93 m (6 ft 4 in)	95 kg (209 lb)	R	30 November 1994	(France) Montpellier
5	Dino Guillaume	D	1.89 m (6 ft 2 in)	82 kg (181 lb)	R	24 March 1995	(France) Marseille
6	Thibaut Simon	D	1.92 m (6 ft 4 in)	95 kg (209 lb)	R	18 December 1983	(France) Marseille
7	Ugo Crousillat (c)	D	1.92 m (6 ft 4 in)	90 kg (198 lb)	L	27 October 1990	(Hungary) Szolnoki Dózsa
8	Michael Izdinsky	D	1.77 m (5 ft 10 in)	71 kg (157 lb)	L	23 July 1992	(France) Olympic Nice
9	Mehdi Marzouki	CF	1.93 m (6 ft 4 in)	90 kg (198 lb)	R	26 May 1987	(Germany) Spandau 04
10	Manuel Laversanne	D	1.85 m (6 ft 1 in)	86 kg (190 lb)	R	10 May 1987	(France) Olympic Nice
11	Mathieu Peisson	D	1.85 m (6 ft 1 in)	82 kg (181 lb)	R	29 September 1982	(France) Sète
12	Alexandre Camarasa	D	1.93 m (6 ft 4 in)	91 kg (201 lb)	R	10 June 1987	(France) Marseille
13	Rémi Garsau	GK	1.90 m (6 ft 3 in)	89 kg (196 lb)	R	22 December 1994	(France) Strasbourg

== Group C ==
=== Serbia ===
The following is the Serbian roster in the men's water polo tournament of the 2017 World Aquatics Championships.

Head coach: Dejan Savić

№	Name	Pos.	Height	Weight	L/R	Date of birth	2016/17 club
1	Gojko Pijetlović	GK	1.94 m (6 ft 4 in)	100 kg (220 lb)	R	7 August 1983	(Romania) CSM Oradea
2	Dušan Mandić	D	2.02 m (6 ft 8 in)	115 kg (254 lb)	L	16 June 1994	(Italy) Pro Recco
3	Viktor Rašović	CF	1.90 m (6 ft 3 in)	90 kg (198 lb)	R	13 August 1993	(Spain) Barceloneta
4	Sava Ranđelović	D	1.93 m (6 ft 4 in)	104 kg (229 lb)	R	17 July 1993	(Italy) Brescia
5	Miloš Ćuk	D	1.90 m (6 ft 3 in)	85 kg (187 lb)	R	21 December 1990	(Hungary) Eger
6	Duško Pijetlović	CF	1.92 m (6 ft 4 in)	105 kg (231 lb)	R	25 April 1985	(Italy) Pro Recco
7	Nemanja Ubović	CF	1.94 m (6 ft 4 in)	104 kg (229 lb)	R	24 May 1987	(Italy) Brescia
8	Milan Aleksić	D	1.92 m (6 ft 4 in)	103 kg (227 lb)	L	13 May 1986	(Hungary) Szolnoki Dózsa
9	Nikola Jakšić	D	1.97 m (6 ft 6 in)	99 kg (218 lb)	R	17 January 1997	(Serbia) Partizan
10	Filip Filipović (c)	D	1.96 m (6 ft 5 in)	106 kg (234 lb)	L	2 May 1987	(Italy) Pro Recco
11	Andrija Prlainović	D	1.87 m (6 ft 2 in)	96 kg (212 lb)	R	28 April 1987	(Hungary) Szolnoki Dózsa
12	Stefan Mitrović	D	1.95 m (6 ft 5 in)	91 kg (201 lb)	R	29 March 1988	(Hungary) Ferencváros
13	Branislav Mitrović	GK	2.01 m (6 ft 7 in)	102 kg (225 lb)	R	30 January 1985	(Hungary) Eger

=== Greece ===
The following is the Greek roster in the men's water polo tournament of the 2017 World Aquatics Championships.

Head coach: Thodoris Vlachos

№	Name	Pos.	Height	Weight	L/R	Date of birth	2016/17 club
1	Konstantinos Flegkas	GK	1.93 m (6 ft 4 in)	87 kg (192 lb)	R	17 July 1988	(Greece) Ydraikos
2	Konstantinos Genidounias	D	1.82 m (6 ft 0 in)	90 kg (198 lb)	R	3 May 1993	(Greece) Olympiacos
3	Evangelos Delakas	CF	1.89 m (6 ft 2 in)	89 kg (196 lb)	R	8 February 1985	(Greece) Olympiacos
4	Georgios Dervisis	CF	1.95 m (6 ft 5 in)	95 kg (209 lb)	R	30 October 1994	(Greece) Olympiacos
5	Ioannis Fountoulis (c)	D	1.86 m (6 ft 1 in)	88 kg (194 lb)	R	25 May 1988	(Greece) Olympiacos
6	Marios Kapotsis	D	1.83 m (6 ft 0 in)	87 kg (192 lb)	R	13 September 1991	(Greece) Vouliagmeni
7	Kyriakos Pontikeas	CF	1.90 m (6 ft 3 in)	84 kg (185 lb)	R	9 May 1991	(Greece) Olympiacos
8	Stylianos Argyropoulos	CF	1.86 m (6 ft 1 in)	75 kg (165 lb)	R	2 August 1996	(Greece) Olympiacos
9	Konstantinos Mourikis	CF	1.97 m (6 ft 6 in)	110 kg (243 lb)	R	11 July 1988	(Greece) Olympiacos
10	Christodoulos Kolomvos	CF	1.86 m (6 ft 1 in)	102 kg (225 lb)	R	26 October 1988	(Greece) Olympiacos
11	Alexandros Gounas	D	1.79 m (5 ft 10 in)	74 kg (163 lb)	R	3 October 1989	(Greece) Olympiacos
12	Angelos Vlachopoulos	D	1.80 m (5 ft 11 in)	75 kg (165 lb)	R	28 September 1991	(Italy) Posillipo
13	Emmanouil Zerdevas	GK	1.83 m (6 ft 0 in)	78 kg (172 lb)	R	12 August 1997	(Greece) Vouliagmeni

=== Spain ===
The following is the Spanish roster in the men's water polo tournament of the 2017 World Aquatics Championships.

Head coach: David Martín

№	Name	Pos.	Height	Weight	L/R	Date of birth	2016/17 club
1	Daniel López	GK	1.92 m (6 ft 4 in)	88 kg (194 lb)	R	16 July 1980	(Spain) Barceloneta
2	Alberto Munarriz	CF	1.95 m (6 ft 5 in)	95 kg (209 lb)	R	19 May 1994	(Spain) Barceloneta
3	Álvaro Granados	D			R	8 October 1998	(Spain) Terrassa
4	Miguel del Toro	CF			R	16 August 1993	(Spain) Mediterrani
5	Alejandro Bustos	CF			R	17 March 1997	(Spain) Real Canoe
6	Marc Minguell (c)	CF	1.85 m (6 ft 1 in)	94 kg (207 lb)	R	14 January 1985	(Spain) Barceloneta
7	Alberto Barroso	D			R	8 July 1994	(Italy) Acquachiara
8	Albert Español	D	1.89 m (6 ft 2 in)	86 kg (190 lb)	R	29 October 1985	(Greece) Olympiacos
9	Roger Tahull	CF			R	11 May 1997	(Spain) Barceloneta
10	Francisco Fernández	CF			R	21 June 1986	(Spain) Barceloneta
11	Blai Mallarach	D			L	21 August 1987	(Spain) Barceloneta
12	Víctor Gutiérrez	CF	1.94 m (6 ft 4 in)	105 kg (231 lb)	R	6 March 1991	(Spain) Real Canoe
13	Josè Maria Motos	GK			R	22 June 1992	(Spain) Sabadell

=== South Africa ===
The following is the South African roster in the men's water polo tournament of the 2017 World Aquatics Championships.

Head coach: Paul Martin

№	Name	Pos.	Height	Weight	L/R	Date of birth	2016/17 club
1	Julian Lewis	GK	1.86 m (6 ft 1 in)	81 kg (179 lb)	R	25 October 1995	
2	Etienne Le Roux	D	1.84 m (6 ft 0 in)	84 kg (185 lb)	R	18 December 1987	
3	Devon Card	CF	1.86 m (6 ft 1 in)	110 kg (243 lb)	R	25 February 1991	
4	Nardus Badenhorst	CF	1.98 m (6 ft 6 in)	112 kg (247 lb)	R	26 August 1990	
5	Chris Brown	CF			R	23 July 1987	
6	Joao Marco de Carvalho	CF	1.85 m (6 ft 1 in)	92 kg (203 lb)	R	14 November 1983	
7	Lood Rabie	CF			R	18 May 1990	
8	Nicholas Rodda	D	1.89 m (6 ft 2 in)	86 kg (190 lb)	R	11 January 1992	
9	Dean Whyte	D	1.87 m (6 ft 2 in)	85 kg (187 lb)	R	17 September 1988	
10	Pierre Le Roux (c)	D	1.85 m (6 ft 1 in)	87 kg (192 lb)	R	12 December 1985	
11	Nicholas Molyneux	D	1.85 m (6 ft 1 in)	90 kg (198 lb)	R	23 June 1986	
12	Roarke Olver	D			R	21 April 1995	
13	Themba Mthembu	GK			R	6 September 1997	

== Group D ==
=== Croatia ===
The following is the Croatian roster in the men's water polo tournament of the 2017 World Aquatics Championships.

Head coach: Ivica Tucak

№	Name	Pos.	Height	Weight	L/R	Date of birth	2016/17 club
1	Marko Bijač	GK	2.01 m (6 ft 7 in)	85 kg (187 lb)	R	12 January 1991	(Croatia) Jug Dubrovnik
2	Marko Macan	CF	1.95 m (6 ft 5 in)	110 kg (243 lb)	R	26 April 1993	(Croatia) Jug Dubrovnik
3	Loren Fatović	D			R	16 November 1996	(Croatia) Jug Dubrovnik
4	Luka Lončar	CF	1.95 m (6 ft 5 in)	107 kg (236 lb)	R	26 June 1987	(Croatia) Jug Dubrovnik
5	Maro Joković	D	2.03 m (6 ft 8 in)	95 kg (209 lb)	L	1 October 1987	(Croatia) Jug Dubrovnik
6	Ivan Buljubašić	CF	1.98 m (6 ft 6 in)	108 kg (238 lb)	R	31 October 1987	(Croatia) Primorje Rijeka
7	Ante Vukičević	D	1.86 m (6 ft 1 in)	93 kg (205 lb)	R	24 February 1993	(Croatia) Primorje Rijeka
8	Andro Bušlje	CF	2.00 m (6 ft 7 in)	115 kg (254 lb)	R	4 January 1986	(Greece) Olympiacos
9	Sandro Sukno (c)	D	2.00 m (6 ft 7 in)	93 kg (205 lb)	R	30 June 1990	(Italy) Pro Recco
10	Ivan Krapić	CF	1.96 m (6 ft 5 in)	105 kg (231 lb)	R	14 February 1989	(Italy) Acquachiara
11	Anđelo Šetka	D	1.86 m (6 ft 1 in)	87 kg (192 lb)	R	14 September 1985	(Italy) AS Roma
12	Xavier García	D	1.98 m (6 ft 6 in)	92 kg (203 lb)	L	5 January 1984	(Croatia) Jug Dubrovnik
13	Ivan Marcelić	GK	1.90 m (6 ft 3 in)	90 kg (198 lb)	R	18 February 1994	(Croatia) HAVK Mladost

=== United States ===
The following is the American roster in the men's water polo tournament of the 2017 World Aquatics Championships.

Head coach: (Serbia) Dejan Udovičić

№	Name	Pos.	Height	Weight	L/R	Date of birth	2016/17 club
1	Baron McQuin	GK			L	27 October 1995	(United States) Regency
2	Johnathan Hooper	D			R	24 July 1997	(United States) LA Premier
3	Marko Vavic	D			R	25 April 1999	(United States) USC Trojans
4	Alex Obert (c)	CF			R	18 December 1991	(United States) Sacramento
5	Ben Hallock	CF			R	22 November 1997	(United States) LA Premier
6	Luca Cupido	D			R	9 November 1995	(United States) Newport Beach
7	Thomas Dunstan	D	1.93 m (6 ft 4 in)	75 kg (165 lb)	L	29 September 1997	(United States) Regency
8	Nicholas Carniglia	D			L	7 January 1996	(United States) Davis
9	Alex Bowen	D			R	4 September 1997	(Hungary) Miskolc
10	Chancellor Ramirez	CF			R	1 October 1994	(United States) New York Athletic Club
11	Alex Roelse	CF			R	10 January 1995	(United States) Bruin
12	Maxwell Irving	D			R	21 May 1995	(United States) LA Premier
13	Drew Holland	GK			R	11 April 1995	(United States) Lamorinda

=== Russia ===
The following is the Russian roster in the men's water polo tournament of the 2017 World Aquatics Championships.

Head coach: Sergey Evstigneev

№	Name	Pos.	Height	Weight	L/R	Date of birth	2016/17 club
1	Kirill Korneev	GK	1.88 m (6 ft 2 in)	86 kg (190 lb)	R	29 September 1994	(Russia) Dinamo Astrakhan
2	Nikolay Lazarev	D	1.91 m (6 ft 3 in)	89 kg (196 lb)	L	26 February 1992	
3	Egor Vasilyev	CF			R	30 April 1996	
4	Nikita Dereviankin	CF			L	21 June 1994	
5	Alexey Bugaychuk	D	1.89 m (6 ft 2 in)	103 kg (227 lb)	R	30 March 1989	
6	Artem Ashaev	D	1.90 m (6 ft 3 in)	96 kg (212 lb)	R	5 December 1988	
7	Daniil Merkulov	D	1.90 m (6 ft 3 in)	90 kg (198 lb)	R	3 March 1997	
8	Ivan Nagaev	D	1.95 m (6 ft 5 in)	85 kg (187 lb)	L	30 November 1993	
9	Ivan Suchkov	CF			R	15 June 1995	
10	Dmitrii Kholod	D	1.98 m (6 ft 6 in)	98 kg (216 lb)	R	16 January 1992	
11	Sergey Lisunov (c)	CF	1.98 m (6 ft 6 in)	116 kg (256 lb)	R	12 October 1986	(Russia) Spartak Volgograd
12	Roman Shepelev	D	1.87 m (6 ft 2 in)	80 kg (176 lb)	R	3 August 1993	
13	Vitaly Statsenko	GK			R	21 July 1997	

=== Japan ===
The following is the Japanese roster in the men's water polo tournament of the 2017 World Aquatics Championships.

Head coach: Yoji Omoto

№	Name	Pos.	Height	Weight	L/R	Date of birth	2016/17 club
1	Katsuyuki Tanamura	GK	1.84 m (6 ft 0 in)	84 kg (185 lb)	R	3 August 1989	
2	Seiya Adachi	D	1.72 m (5 ft 8 in)	67 kg (148 lb)	R	24 June 1995	
3	Shuma Kawamoto	D			R	23 April 1996	
4	Mitsuaki Shiga	D	1.77 m (5 ft 10 in)	75 kg (165 lb)	R	16 September 1991	
5	Yoshida Takuma	D			R	11 October 1994	
6	Atsuto Iida	CF	1.81 m (5 ft 11 in)	82 kg (181 lb)	R	24 December 1993	
7	Yusuke Shimizu (c)	CF	1.81 m (5 ft 11 in)	93 kg (205 lb)	L	7 September 1988	
8	Mitsuru Takata	CF			R	8 December 1995	
9	Atsushi Arai	D	1.69 m (5 ft 7 in)	62 kg (137 lb)	R	3 February 1994	
10	Kohei Inaba	D			R	27 January 1996	
11	Keigo Okawa	D	1.83 m (6 ft 0 in)	96 kg (212 lb)	R	11 March 1990	
12	Kenta Araki	CF			R	6 April 1995	
13	Tomoyoshi Fukushima	GK	1.77 m (5 ft 10 in)	75 kg (165 lb)	R	3 June 1993	
