= Water polo at the 2020 Summer Olympics – Men's team rosters =

These are the rosters of all participating teams at the men's water polo tournament at the 2020 Summer Olympics in Tokyo. The twelve national teams were required to submit squads of 12 players. Additionally, teams could name one alternate player. If a player on the submitted squad list suffered an injury or illness, that player would be able to be replaced by the player in the alternate list. On 3 July 2021, the International Olympic Committee (IOC) confirmed that there was a change for the 2020 Summer Olympics, allowing all 13 water polo players named to be available on the roster, with 12 being named for each match. This change was implemented due to the challenges of the COVID-19 pandemic. As of 2 August 2021, all players competed in the men's tournament.

== Abbreviations ==
No.	Cap number	(C)	Captain	Ref	Reference
Pos	Playing position	FP	Field player	GK	Goalkeeper
CB	Centre back	CF	Centre forward	D	Driver
L/R	Handedness	L	Left-handed	R	Right-handed
Apps	International matches played	OG	Olympic participations	Goals	Goals scored in Olympic Games

== Group A ==
=== Greece ===
Greece's final squad was announced on 3 July 2021.

Head coach: Thodoris Vlachos

No.	Player	Pos.	L/R	Height	Weight	Date of birth (age)	Apps	OG/ Goals	Club	Ref
1	Emmanouil Zerdevas	GK	R	1.85 m (6 ft 1 in)	89 kg (196 lb)	12 August 1997 (aged 23)	84	0/0	(Greece) Olympiacos	
2	Konstantinos Genidounias	D	R	1.83 m (6 ft 0 in)	92 kg (203 lb)	3 May 1993 (aged 28)	161	1/4	(Greece) Olympiacos	
3	Dimitrios Skoumpakis	CB	R	2.03 m (6 ft 8 in)	109 kg (240 lb)	18 December 1998 (aged 22)	70	0/0	(Greece) Olympiacos	
4	Marios Kapotsis	D	R	1.83 m (6 ft 0 in)	84 kg (185 lb)	13 September 1991 (aged 29)	108	0/0	(Greece) Olympiacos	
5	Ioannis Fountoulis (C)	D	R	1.85 m (6 ft 1 in)	89 kg (196 lb)	25 May 1988 (aged 33)	311	2/24	(Greece) Olympiacos	
6	Alexandros Papanastasiou	D	R	1.94 m (6 ft 4 in)	86 kg (190 lb)	12 February 1999 (aged 22)	58	0/0	(Croatia) Jug Dubrovnik	
7	Georgios Dervisis	CB	R	1.95 m (6 ft 5 in)	100 kg (220 lb)	30 October 1994 (aged 26)	146	1/3	(Greece) Olympiacos	
8	Stylianos Argyropoulos	CB	R	1.90 m (6 ft 3 in)	100 kg (220 lb)	2 August 1996 (aged 24)	97	0/0	(Greece) Olympiacos	
9	Konstantinos Mourikis	CF	R	1.98 m (6 ft 6 in)	115 kg (254 lb)	11 July 1988 (aged 33)	272	2/11	(Greece) Olympiacos	
10	Christodoulos Kolomvos	CF	R	1.86 m (6 ft 1 in)	106 kg (234 lb)	26 October 1988 (aged 32)	239	1/2	(Turkey) Enka	
11	Konstantinos Gkiouvetsis	D	R	1.91 m (6 ft 3 in)	94 kg (207 lb)	19 November 1999 (aged 21)	28	0/0	(Greece) Vouliagmeni	
12	Angelos Vlachopoulos	D	R	1.80 m (5 ft 11 in)	80 kg (176 lb)	28 September 1991 (aged 29)	183	1/13	(Serbia) Novi Beograd	
13	Konstantinos Galanidis	GK	R	2.02 m (6 ft 8 in)	110 kg (243 lb)	1 September 1990 (aged 30)	103	0/0	(Greece) Apollon Smyrnis	
Average				1.90 m (6 ft 3 in)	96 kg (212 lb)	27 years, 255 days	143			

Note: Age as of 23 July 2021
Source: Greece Men | Tokyo 2020 Olympics

=== Hungary ===
Hungary's final squad was announced on 29 June 2021.

Head coach: Tamás Märcz

No.	Player	Pos.	L/R	Height	Weight	Date of birth (age)	Apps	OG/ Goals	Club	Ref
1	Viktor Nagy	GK	R	1.98 m (6 ft 6 in)	96 kg (212 lb)	24 July 1984 (aged 36)	229	2/0	(Hungary) Szolnoki	
2	Dániel Angyal	CB	R	2.03 m (6 ft 8 in)	108 kg (238 lb)	29 March 1992 (aged 29)	106	0/0	(Hungary) Szolnoki	
3	Krisztián Manhercz	D	R	1.91 m (6 ft 3 in)	91 kg (201 lb)	6 February 1997 (aged 24)	142	1/8	(Hungary) OSC Budapest	
4	Gergő Zalánki	D	L	1.92 m (6 ft 4 in)	91 kg (201 lb)	26 February 1995 (aged 26)	109	1/7	(Hungary) Ferencvárosi	
5	Márton Vámos	D	L	2.02 m (6 ft 8 in)	105 kg (231 lb)	24 June 1992 (aged 29)	241	1/14	(Hungary) Ferencvárosi	
6	Norbert Hosnyánszky	CB	R	1.96 m (6 ft 5 in)	101 kg (223 lb)	4 March 1984 (aged 37)	317	3/24	(Hungary) Budapesti Honvéd	
7	Mátyás Pásztor	D	R			20 February 1987 (aged 34)	22	0/0	(Hungary) Budapesti Vasutas	
8	Szilárd Jansik	CB	R	1.95 m (6 ft 5 in)	96 kg (212 lb)	6 April 1994 (aged 27)	52	0/0	(Hungary) Ferencvárosi	
9	Balázs Erdélyi	D	R	1.96 m (6 ft 5 in)	94 kg (207 lb)	16 February 1990 (aged 31)	167	1/10	(Hungary) OSC Budapest	
10	Dénes Varga (C)	D	R	1.93 m (6 ft 4 in)	96 kg (212 lb)	29 March 1987 (aged 34)	307	3/34	(Hungary) Ferencvárosi	
11	Tamás Mezei	CF	L	1.97 m (6 ft 6 in)	108 kg (238 lb)	14 September 1990 (aged 30)	90	0/0	(Hungary) Ferencvárosi	
12	Balázs Hárai	CF	R	2.02 m (6 ft 8 in)	110 kg (243 lb)	5 April 1987 (aged 34)	250	2/14	(Hungary) OSC Budapest	
13	Soma Vogel	GK	R	1.98 m (6 ft 6 in)	85 kg (187 lb)	7 July 1997 (aged 24)	29	0/0	(Hungary) Ferencvárosi	
Average				1.97 m (6 ft 6 in)	98 kg (216 lb)	30 years, 289 days	159			

Note: Age as of 23 July 2021
Source: Hungary Men | Tokyo 2020 Olympics

=== Italy ===
Italy's final squad was announced on 2 July 2021.

Head coach: Sandro Campagna

No.	Player	Pos.	L/R	Height	Weight	Date of birth (age)	Apps	OG/ Goals	Club	Ref
1	Marco Del Lungo	GK	R	1.90 m (6 ft 3 in)	97 kg (214 lb)	1 March 1990 (aged 31)	190	1/0	(Italy) Brescia	
2	Francesco Di Fulvio	D	R	1.90 m (6 ft 3 in)	88 kg (194 lb)	15 August 1993 (aged 27)	192	1/8	(Italy) Pro Recco	
3	Stefano Luongo	D	R	1.84 m (6 ft 0 in)	84 kg (185 lb)	5 January 1990 (aged 31)	167	0/0	(Italy) Pro Recco	
4	Pietro Figlioli (C)	D	R	1.91 m (6 ft 3 in)	98 kg (216 lb)	29 May 1984 (aged 37)	263	4/42	(Italy) Pro Recco	
5	Nicholas Presciutti	CB	R	1.89 m (6 ft 2 in)	90 kg (198 lb)	14 December 1993 (aged 27)	109	0/0	(Italy) Pro Recco	
6	Alessandro Velotto	D	R	1.86 m (6 ft 1 in)	85 kg (187 lb)	12 February 1995 (aged 26)	153	1/1	(Italy) Pro Recco	
7	Vincenzo Renzuto	D	R	1.91 m (6 ft 3 in)	80 kg (176 lb)	8 April 1993 (aged 28)	95	0/0	(Italy) Brescia	
8	Gonzalo Echenique	D	L	1.95 m (6 ft 5 in)	96 kg (212 lb)	27 April 1990 (aged 31)	59	1/11	(Italy) Pro Recco	
9	Niccolò Figari	CB	R	1.98 m (6 ft 6 in)	91 kg (201 lb)	24 January 1988 (aged 33)	170	0/0	(Italy) Pro Recco	
10	Michaël Bodegas	CF	R	1.92 m (6 ft 4 in)	102 kg (225 lb)	3 May 1987 (aged 34)	122	1/3	(Spain) Barceloneta	
11	Matteo Aicardi	CF	R	1.92 m (6 ft 4 in)	102 kg (225 lb)	19 April 1986 (aged 35)	265	2/9	(Italy) Pro Recco	
12	Vincenzo Dolce	D	R	1.95 m (6 ft 5 in)	92 kg (203 lb)	11 May 1995 (aged 26)	56	0/0	(Italy) Brescia	
13	Gianmarco Nicosia	GK	R	1.96 m (6 ft 5 in)	93 kg (205 lb)	12 February 1998 (aged 23)	58	0/0	(Italy) Telimar Palermo	
Average				1.91 m (6 ft 3 in)	92 kg (203 lb)	30 years, 118 days	146			

Note: Age as of 23 July 2021
Source: Italy Men | Tokyo 2020 Olympics

=== Japan ===
Japan's final squad was announced on 19 May 2021.

Head coach: Yoji Omoto

No.	Player	Pos.	L/R	Height	Weight	Date of birth (age)	Apps	OG/ Goals	Club	Ref
1	Katsuyuki Tanamura	GK	R	1.83 m (6 ft 0 in)	86 kg (190 lb)	3 August 1989 (aged 31)	142	1/0	(Japan) Bourbon	
2	Seiya Adachi	D	R	1.72 m (5 ft 8 in)	76 kg (168 lb)	24 June 1995 (aged 26)	48	1/1	(Romania) CSM Digi Oradea	
3	Harukiirario Koppu	CB	R	1.84 m (6 ft 0 in)	84 kg (185 lb)	28 December 1998 (aged 22)	141	0/0	(Japan) DSK Dragons	
4	Mitsuaki Shiga	D	R	1.77 m (5 ft 10 in)	76 kg (168 lb)	16 September 1991 (aged 29)	136	1/3	(Japan) Kingfisher74	
5	Takuma Yoshida	D	R	1.75 m (5 ft 9 in)	77 kg (170 lb)	11 October 1994 (aged 26)	122	0/0	(Japan) Kingfisher74	
6	Toi Suzuki	D	R	1.83 m (6 ft 0 in)	78 kg (172 lb)	20 October 1999 (aged 21)	112	0/0	(Japan) Nippon Sport	
7	Yusuke Shimizu	CF	L	1.81 m (5 ft 11 in)	95 kg (209 lb)	7 September 1988 (aged 32)		1/1	(Japan) Bourbon	
8	Mitsuru Takata	D	R	1.82 m (6 ft 0 in)	86 kg (190 lb)	8 December 1995 (aged 25)	72	0/0	(Japan) Kingfisher74	
9	Atsushi Arai	D	R	1.68 m (5 ft 6 in)	66 kg (146 lb)	3 February 1994 (aged 27)	18	1/4	(Japan) Kingfisher74	
10	Yusuke Inaba	D	R	1.80 m (5 ft 11 in)	79 kg (174 lb)	11 April 2000 (aged 21)	42	0/0	(Japan) Bourbon	
11	Keigo Okawa (C)	D	R	1.83 m (6 ft 0 in)	90 kg (198 lb)	11 March 1990 (aged 31)	118	1/9	(Japan) Kingfisher74	
12	Kenta Araki	CF	R	1.86 m (6 ft 1 in)	94 kg (207 lb)	6 April 1995 (aged 26)	18	0/0	(Japan) Kingfisher74	
13	Tomoyoshi Fukushima	GK	R	1.78 m (5 ft 10 in)	80 kg (176 lb)	3 June 1993 (aged 28)	112	1/0	(Japan) Kingfisher74	
Average				1.79 m (5 ft 10 in)	82 kg (181 lb)	27 years, 29 days	90			

Note: Age as of 23 July 2021
Source: Japan Men | Tokyo 2020 Olympics

=== South Africa ===
South Africa's squad was announced on 24 June 2021. Roarke Olver was replaced by Timothy Rezelman.

Head coach: Paul Martin

No.	Player	Pos.	L/R	Height	Weight	Date of birth (age)	Apps	OG/ Goals	Club	Ref
1	Lwazi Madi (C)	GK	R			12 December 1994 (aged 26)	35	0/0	(South Africa) Stellenbosch University	
2	Devon Card	CF	R	1.86 m (6 ft 1 in)	110 kg (243 lb)	25 February 1991 (aged 30)	60	0/0	(South Africa) SACS Old Boys	
3	Timothy Rezelman	D	R			13 January 1995 (aged 26)	6	0/0	(South Africa) OJ Eagles	
4	Ignardus Badenhorst	CF	R	1.98 m (6 ft 6 in)	112 kg (247 lb)	26 August 1990 (aged 30)	61	0/0	(South Africa) OJ Eagles	
5	Cameron Laurenson	CB	R			28 April 1998 (aged 23)	37	0/0	(South Africa) Maties (Stellenbosch)	
6	Ross Stone	D	R			15 May 2000 (aged 21)	30	0/0	(South Africa) Stellenbosch University	
7	Jason Evezard	D	R			17 August 1997 (aged 23)	14	0/0	(South Africa) Maties (Stellenbosch)	
8	Nicholas Rodda	D	R	1.89 m (6 ft 2 in)	86 kg (190 lb)	11 October 1992 (aged 28)	30	0/0	(South Africa) OJ Eagles	
9	Yaseen Margro	D	R			12 February 2000 (aged 21)	14	0/0	(South Africa) KNZ (Durban)	
10	Farouk Mayman	CB	R			3 May 1999 (aged 22)	7	0/0	(South Africa) RWC (Cape Town)	
11	Liam Neill	CF	R			26 October 1997 (aged 23)	35	0/0	(South Africa) University of Cape Town	
12	Donn Stewart	CB	R	1.91 m (6 ft 3 in)		22 August 1980 (aged 40)	90	0/0	(South Africa) Clifton (Durban)	
13	Gareth May	GK	R			9 November 1996 (aged 24)	14	0/0	(South Africa) Team Walrus	
Average						26 years, 185 days	33			

Note: Age as of 23 July 2021
Source: South Africa Men | Tokyo 2020 Olympics

=== United States ===
The United States' final squad was announced on 2 July 2021.

Head coach: (Serbia) Dejan Udovičić

No.	Player	Pos.	L/R	Height	Weight	Date of birth (age)	Apps	OG/ Goals	Club	Ref
1	Alex Wolf	GK	R	2.01 m (6 ft 7 in)	103 kg (227 lb)	19 April 1997 (aged 24)	61	0/0	(Greece) Hydraikos	
2	Johnny Hooper	D	R	1.88 m (6 ft 2 in)	88 kg (194 lb)	24 June 1997 (aged 24)	95	0/0	(Greece) Palaio Faliro	
3	Marko Vavic	D	R	1.98 m (6 ft 6 in)	103 kg (227 lb)	25 April 1999 (aged 22)	89	0/0	(Italy) Roma Nuoto	
4	Alex Obert	CF	R	1.96 m (6 ft 5 in)	105 kg (231 lb)	18 December 1991 (aged 29)	204	1/2	(Croatia) Jug Dubrovnik	
5	Hannes Daube	D	R	1.98 m (6 ft 6 in)	106 kg (234 lb)	5 January 2000 (aged 21)	78	0/0	(Greece) Olympiacos	
6	Luca Cupido	D	R	1.91 m (6 ft 3 in)	97 kg (214 lb)	9 November 1995 (aged 25)	139	1/4	(Italy) Camogli	
7	Ben Hallock	CF	R	1.98 m (6 ft 6 in)	115 kg (254 lb)	22 November 1997 (aged 23)	128	1/0	(Italy) Pro Recco	
8	Dylan Woodhead	CB	R	2.01 m (6 ft 7 in)	100 kg (220 lb)	25 September 1998 (aged 22)	40	0/0	(Greece) Glyfada	
9	Alex Bowen	D	R	1.96 m (6 ft 5 in)	106 kg (234 lb)	4 September 1993 (aged 27)	212	1/3	(Greece) Apollon Smyrnis	
10	Ben Stevenson	D	R	1.93 m (6 ft 4 in)	87 kg (192 lb)	16 March 1995 (aged 26)	38	0/0	(Greece) Glyfada	
11	Jesse Smith (C)	CB	R	1.93 m (6 ft 4 in)	112 kg (247 lb)	27 April 1983 (aged 38)	455	4/16	(United States) NYAC	
12	Max Irving	D	R	1.85 m (6 ft 1 in)	81 kg (179 lb)	21 May 1995 (aged 26)	98	0/0	(Greece) Olympiacos	
13	Drew Holland	GK	R	1.96 m (6 ft 5 in)	83 kg (183 lb)	11 April 1995 (aged 26)	53	0/0	(Greece) Chios	
Average				1.95 m (6 ft 5 in)	99 kg (218 lb)	26 years, 24 days	130			

Note: Age as of 23 July 2021
Source: United States Men | Tokyo 2020 Olympics

== Group B ==
=== Australia ===
Australia's final squad was announced on 1 July 2021.

Head coach: (Croatia) Elvis Fatović

No.	Player	Pos.	L/R	Height	Weight	Date of birth (age)	Apps	OG/ Goals	Club	Ref
1	Anthony Hrysanthos	GK	R			28 November 1995 (aged 25)	70	0/0	(Australia) Sydney University Lions	
2	Richie Campbell	CB	R	1.93 m (6 ft 4 in)	99 kg (218 lb)	18 September 1987 (aged 33)	287	3/23	(Australia) UNSW Wests Magpies	
3	George Ford	CB	R	1.92 m (6 ft 4 in)	95 kg (209 lb)	24 February 1993 (aged 28)	132	1/1	(Australia) Sydney University Lions	
4	Goran Tomasevic	CF	R			21 June 1990 (aged 31)	0	0/0	(Australia) Sydney University Lions	
5	Nathan Power	CB	R	2.00 m (6 ft 7 in)	104 kg (229 lb)	13 February 1993 (aged 28)	164	0/0	(Australia) UNSW Wests Magpies	
6	Lachlan Edwards	D	R	1.96 m (6 ft 5 in)		6 February 1995 (aged 26)	79	0/0	(Australia) Drummoyne Devils	
7	Aidan Roach	D	R	1.87 m (6 ft 2 in)	88 kg (194 lb)	7 September 1990 (aged 30)	192	2/6	(Australia) Drummoyne Devils	
8	Aaron Younger (C)	D	R	1.93 m (6 ft 4 in)	100 kg (220 lb)	25 September 1991 (aged 29)	199	2/9	(Italy) Pro Recco	
9	Andrew Ford	D	R	1.89 m (6 ft 2 in)		21 April 1995 (aged 26)	75	0/0	(Australia) UNSW Wests Magpies	
10	Timothy Putt	CB	R			6 November 1998 (aged 22)	70	0/0	(Australia) UNSW Wests Magpies	
11	Rhys Howden	D	R	1.89 m (6 ft 2 in)	84 kg (185 lb)	2 April 1987 (aged 34)	234	3/14	(Australia) Queensland Thunder	
12	Blake Edwards	CF	R	1.88 m (6 ft 2 in)		14 February 1992 (aged 29)	94	0/0	(Australia) Drummoyne Devils	
13	Joel Dennerley	GK	R	1.95 m (6 ft 5 in)	91 kg (201 lb)	25 June 1987 (aged 34)	151	2/0	(Australia) UNSW Wests Magpies	
Average				1.92 m (6 ft 4 in)	94 kg (207 lb)	29 years, 123 days	134			

Note: Age as of 23 July 2021
Source: Australia Men | Tokyo 2020 Olympics

=== Croatia ===
Croatia's final squad was announced on 8 July 2021.

Head coach: Ivica Tucak

No.	Player	Pos.	L/R	Height	Weight	Date of birth (age)	Apps	OG/ Goals	Club	Ref
1	Marko Bijač	GK	R	2.01 m (6 ft 7 in)	88 kg (194 lb)	12 January 1991 (aged 30)	96	1/0	(Greece) Olympiacos	
2	Marko Macan	CB	R	1.95 m (6 ft 5 in)	109 kg (240 lb)	26 April 1993 (aged 28)	109	1/0	(Germany) Waspo 98 Hannover	
3	Loren Fatović	D	R	1.85 m (6 ft 1 in)	84 kg (185 lb)	16 November 1996 (aged 24)	70	0/0	(Croatia) Jug Dubrovnik	
4	Luka Lončar	CF	R	1.95 m (6 ft 5 in)	106 kg (234 lb)	26 June 1987 (aged 34)	182	1/4	(Italy) Pro Recco	
5	Maro Joković	D	L	2.03 m (6 ft 8 in)	96 kg (212 lb)	1 October 1987 (aged 33)	292	3/27	(Italy) Brescia	
6	Luka Bukić	D	R	1.95 m (6 ft 5 in)	90 kg (198 lb)	30 April 1994 (aged 27)	55	1/5	(Croatia) Jadran Split	
7	Ante Vukičević	D	R	1.87 m (6 ft 2 in)	95 kg (209 lb)	24 February 1993 (aged 28)	65	0/0	(France) Marseille	
8	Andro Bušlje (C)	CB	R	1.99 m (6 ft 6 in)	115 kg (254 lb)	4 January 1986 (aged 35)	360	3/14	(Greece) Olympiacos	
9	Lovre Miloš	D	R	1.96 m (6 ft 5 in)	94 kg (207 lb)	5 April 1994 (aged 27)	41	0/0	(Croatia) HAVK Mladost	
10	Josip Vrlić	CF	R	1.98 m (6 ft 6 in)	130 kg (287 lb)	25 April 1986 (aged 35)	44	1/4	(Croatia) HAVK Mladost	
11	Paulo Obradović	CB	R	1.90 m (6 ft 3 in)	100 kg (220 lb)	9 March 1986 (aged 35)	180	1/5	(Croatia) Jug Dubrovnik	
12	Xavier García	D	L	1.98 m (6 ft 6 in)	92 kg (203 lb)	5 January 1984 (aged 37)	385	4/25	(Croatia) Jug Dubrovnik	
13	Ivan Marcelić	GK	R	1.92 m (6 ft 4 in)	106 kg (234 lb)	18 February 1994 (aged 27)	85	0/0	(Croatia) HAVK Mladost	
Average				1.95 m (6 ft 5 in)	100 kg (220 lb)	31 years, 67 days	151			

Note: Age as of 23 July 2021
Source: Croatia Men | Tokyo 2020 Olympics

=== Kazakhstan ===
Head coach: (Montenegro) Nemanja Knežević

No.	Player	Pos.	L/R	Height	Weight	Date of birth (age)	Apps	OG/ Goals	Club	Ref
1	Madikhan Makhmetov	GK	R	1.83 m (6 ft 0 in)	82 kg (181 lb)	3 March 1993 (aged 28)	120	0/0	(Kazakhstan) Astana	
2	Yevgeniy Medvedev	D	R	1.86 m (6 ft 1 in)	90 kg (198 lb)	9 August 1985 (aged 35)	150	0/0	(Kazakhstan) Astana	
3	Miras Aubakirov	D	R	1.83 m (6 ft 0 in)	83 kg (183 lb)	20 October 1996 (aged 24)	170	0/0	(Kazakhstan) Astana	
4	Dušan Marković	CB	R	1.92 m (6 ft 4 in)	103 kg (227 lb)	3 May 1990 (aged 31)	6	0/0	(Serbia) Crvena zvezda	
5	Alexey Shmider	D	R	1.83 m (6 ft 0 in)	83 kg (183 lb)	19 March 1990 (aged 31)	180	1/2	(Kazakhstan) Astana	
6	Danil Artyukh	CB	R	1.93 m (6 ft 4 in)	95 kg (209 lb)	2 June 2003 (aged 18)	6	0/0	(Kazakhstan) Astana	
7	Murat Shakenov (C)	D	R	1.83 m (6 ft 0 in)	80 kg (176 lb)	23 September 1990 (aged 30)	200	1/1	(Kazakhstan) Astana	
8	Srđan Vuksanović	D	R	2.02 m (6 ft 8 in)	85 kg (187 lb)	5 July 1992 (aged 29)	6	0/0	(Serbia) Šabac	
9	Rustam Ukumanov	D	R	1.92 m (6 ft 4 in)	103 kg (227 lb)	22 March 1986 (aged 35)	327	1/3	(Kazakhstan) Astana	
10	Mikhail Ruday	CF	R	1.92 m (6 ft 4 in)	110 kg (243 lb)	4 May 1988 (aged 33)	180	1/0	(Russia) Spartak Volgograd	
11	Altay Altayev	CF	R	1.94 m (6 ft 4 in)	100 kg (220 lb)	14 February 1996 (aged 25)	150	0/0	(Kazakhstan) Astana	
12	Stanislav Shvedov	CB	R	1.83 m (6 ft 0 in)	83 kg (183 lb)	24 November 1998 (aged 22)	100	0/0	(Kazakhstan) Astana	
13	Pavel Lipilin	GK	R	1.97 m (6 ft 6 in)	77 kg (170 lb)	11 July 1999 (aged 22)	36	0/0	(Kazakhstan) Astana	
Average				1.89 m (6 ft 2 in)	90 kg (198 lb)	28 years, 123 days	125			

Note: Age as of 23 July 2021
Source: Kazakhstan Men | Tokyo 2020 Olympics

=== Montenegro ===
Montenegro's final squad was announced on 8 July 2021.

Head coach: Vladimir Gojković

No.	Player	Pos.	L/R	Height	Weight	Date of birth (age)	Apps	OG/ Goals	Club	Ref
1	Slaven Kandić	GK	R	1.97 m (6 ft 6 in)	99 kg (218 lb)	2 April 1991 (aged 30)	68	0/0	(France) Pays d'Aix	
2	Draško Brguljan (C)	D	R	1.94 m (6 ft 4 in)	92 kg (203 lb)	27 December 1984 (aged 36)	347	3/14	(Hungary) Vasas	
3	Miroslav Perković	CF	R	2.02 m (6 ft 8 in)	109 kg (240 lb)	15 March 2001 (aged 20)	14	0/0	(Montenegro) Primorac Kotor	
4	Marko Petković	D	R	1.89 m (6 ft 2 in)	85 kg (187 lb)	3 March 1989 (aged 32)	72	0/0	(Montenegro) Jadran Herceg Novi	
5	Uroš Čučković	CB	R	2.00 m (6 ft 7 in)	102 kg (225 lb)	25 April 1990 (aged 31)	140	1/1	(France) Marseille	
6	Vlado Popadić	CB	R	1.87 m (6 ft 2 in)	89 kg (196 lb)	25 April 1996 (aged 25)	44	0/0	(France) Pays d'Aix	
7	Stefan Vidović	D	R	1.87 m (6 ft 2 in)	85 kg (187 lb)	8 August 1992 (aged 28)	72	0/0	(Italy) Ortigia	
8	Aleksa Ukropina	D	L	1.96 m (6 ft 5 in)	100 kg (220 lb)	28 September 1998 (aged 22)	62	0/0	(Serbia) Radnički Kragujevac	
9	Aleksandar Ivović	CB	R	1.97 m (6 ft 6 in)	108 kg (238 lb)	24 February 1986 (aged 35)	299	3/39	(Italy) Pro Recco	
10	Vladan Spaić	CF	R	1.89 m (6 ft 2 in)	103 kg (227 lb)	18 June 1997 (aged 24)	58	0/0	(France) Marseille	
11	Dušan Matković	D	R	1.90 m (6 ft 3 in)	80 kg (176 lb)	1 February 1999 (aged 22)	23	0/0	(Montenegro) Primorac Kotor	
12	Dušan Banićević	CB	R	1.89 m (6 ft 2 in)	95 kg (209 lb)	12 October 1998 (aged 22)	10	0/0	(Spain) Sabadell	
13	Petar Tešanović	GK	R	1.95 m (6 ft 5 in)	91 kg (201 lb)	26 November 1998 (aged 22)	18	0/0	(Italy) Brescia	
Average				1.93 m (6 ft 4 in)	95 kg (209 lb)	27 years, 120 days	94			

Note: Age as of 23 July 2021
Source: Montenegro Men | Tokyo 2020 Olympics

=== Serbia ===
Serbia's final squad was announced on 8 July 2021.

Head coach: Dejan Savić

No.	Player	Pos.	L/R	Height	Weight	Date of birth (age)	Apps	OG/ Goals	Club	Ref
1	Gojko Pijetlović	GK	R	1.94 m (6 ft 4 in)	92 kg (203 lb)	7 August 1983 (aged 37)	270	2/0	(Serbia) Novi Beograd	
2	Dušan Mandić	D	L	2.02 m (6 ft 8 in)	105 kg (231 lb)	16 June 1994 (aged 27)	194	2/13	(Serbia) Novi Beograd	
3	Nikola Dedović	D	R	1.89 m (6 ft 2 in)	92 kg (203 lb)	25 January 1992 (aged 29)	29	0/0	(Germany) Spandau 04	
4	Sava Ranđelović	CB	R	1.93 m (6 ft 4 in)	98 kg (216 lb)	17 July 1993 (aged 28)	166	1/2	(Hungary) Vasas	
5	Đorđe Lazić	CF	R	1.94 m (6 ft 4 in)	95 kg (209 lb)	19 May 1996 (aged 25)	34	0/0	(Italy) Brescia	
6	Duško Pijetlović	CF	R	1.97 m (6 ft 6 in)	97 kg (214 lb)	25 April 1985 (aged 36)	452	3/29	(Serbia) Novi Beograd	
7	Strahinja Rašović	D	R	1.88 m (6 ft 2 in)	85 kg (187 lb)	9 March 1992 (aged 29)	84	0/0	(Serbia) Novi Beograd	
8	Milan Aleksić	CB	R	1.93 m (6 ft 4 in)	96 kg (212 lb)	13 May 1986 (aged 35)	259	2/9	(Serbia) Partizan	
9	Nikola Jakšić	CB	R	1.97 m (6 ft 6 in)	91 kg (201 lb)	17 January 1997 (aged 24)	99	1/4	(Serbia) Novi Beograd	
10	Filip Filipović (C)	D	L	1.96 m (6 ft 5 in)	101 kg (223 lb)	2 May 1987 (aged 34)	652	3/41	(Greece) Olympiacos	
11	Andrija Prlainović	D	R	1.87 m (6 ft 2 in)	93 kg (205 lb)	28 April 1987 (aged 34)	325	3/31	(France) Marseille	
12	Stefan Mitrović	D	R	1.95 m (6 ft 5 in)	91 kg (201 lb)	29 March 1988 (aged 33)	256	2/18	(Serbia) Partizan	
13	Branislav Mitrović	GK	R	2.01 m (6 ft 7 in)	100 kg (220 lb)	30 January 1985 (aged 36)	163	1/0	(Hungary) Vasas	
Average				1.94 m (6 ft 4 in)	95 kg (209 lb)	31 years, 234 days	229			

Note: Age as of 23 July 2021
Source: Serbia Men | Tokyo 2020 Olympics

=== Spain ===
Spain's final squad was announced on 9 July 2021.

Head coach: David Martín

No.	Player	Pos.	L/R	Height	Weight	Date of birth (age)	Apps	OG/ Goals	Club	Ref
1	Daniel López	GK	R	1.90 m (6 ft 3 in)	90 kg (198 lb)	16 July 1980 (aged 41)	348	2/0	(Spain) Barceloneta	
2	Alberto Munárriz	D	R	1.97 m (6 ft 6 in)	106 kg (234 lb)	19 May 1994 (aged 27)	128	1/9	(Spain) Barceloneta	
3	Álvaro Granados	D	R	1.92 m (6 ft 4 in)	86 kg (190 lb)	8 October 1998 (aged 22)	68	1/0	(Spain) Barceloneta	
4	Bernat Sanahuja	D	R	1.92 m (6 ft 4 in)	86 kg (190 lb)	21 October 2000 (aged 20)	23	0/0	(Spain) Sabadell	
5	Miguel de Toro	CF	R	2.02 m (6 ft 8 in)	110 kg (243 lb)	16 August 1993 (aged 27)	73	0/0	(Spain) Barceloneta	
6	Marc Larumbe	D	R	1.93 m (6 ft 4 in)	94 kg (207 lb)	30 May 1994 (aged 27)	84	0/0	(Spain) Barceloneta	
7	Martin Famera	CB	R	2.00 m (6 ft 7 in)	109 kg (240 lb)	4 November 1988 (aged 32)	5	0/0	(Spain) Barceloneta	
8	Francisco Fernández	D	R	1.85 m (6 ft 1 in)	84 kg (185 lb)	21 June 1986 (aged 35)	153	1/2	(Spain) Barceloneta	
9	Roger Tahull	CF	R	1.96 m (6 ft 5 in)	104 kg (229 lb)	11 May 1997 (aged 24)	65	1/3	(Spain) Barcelona	
10	Felipe Perrone (C)	D	R	1.83 m (6 ft 0 in)	96 kg (212 lb)	27 February 1986 (aged 35)	172	3/42	(Spain) Barceloneta	
11	Blai Mallarach	D	L	1.87 m (6 ft 2 in)	87 kg (192 lb)	21 August 1987 (aged 33)	285	2/13	(Spain) Barceloneta	
12	Alejandro Bustos	CB	R	1.93 m (6 ft 4 in)	106 kg (234 lb)	17 March 1997 (aged 24)	10	0/0	(Spain) Barceloneta	
13	Unai Aguirre	GK	R	1.92 m (6 ft 4 in)	81 kg (179 lb)	14 July 2002 (aged 19)	3	0/0	(Spain) Barcelona	
Average				1.92 m (6 ft 4 in)	95 kg (209 lb)	28 years, 211 days	109			

Note: Age as of 23 July 2021
Source: Spain Men | Tokyo 2020 Olympics

== Team statistics ==
=== Average age ===
Average age (as of 23 July 2021)
Rk	Average age	Men's team	Confederation	Finish
1	31 years, 234 days	Serbia	Europe – LEN	1st
2	31 years, 67 days	Croatia	Europe – LEN	5th
3	30 years, 289 days	Hungary	Europe – LEN	3rd
4	30 years, 118 days	Italy	Europe – LEN	7th
5	29 years, 123 days	Australia	Oceania – OSA	9th
6	28 years, 211 days	Spain	Europe – LEN	4th
7	28 years, 123 days	Kazakhstan	Asia – AASF	11th
8	27 years, 255 days	Greece	Europe – LEN	2nd
9	27 years, 120 days	Montenegro	Europe – LEN	8th
10	27 years, 29 days	Japan	Asia – AASF	10th
11	26 years, 185 days	South Africa	Africa – CANA	12th
12	26 years, 24 days	United States	Americas – UANA	6th

=== Average height ===
Rk	Average height	Men's team	Confederation	Finish
1	1.97 m (6 ft 6 in)	Hungary	Europe – LEN	3rd
2	1.95 m (6 ft 5 in)	Croatia	Europe – LEN	5th
2	1.95 m (6 ft 5 in)	United States	Americas – UANA	6th
4	1.94 m (6 ft 4 in)	Serbia	Europe – LEN	1st
5	1.93 m (6 ft 4 in)	Montenegro	Europe – LEN	8th
6	1.92 m (6 ft 4 in)	Australia	Oceania – OSA	9th
6	1.92 m (6 ft 4 in)	Spain	Europe – LEN	4th
8	1.91 m (6 ft 3 in)	Italy	Europe – LEN	7th
9	1.90 m (6 ft 3 in)	Greece	Europe – LEN	2nd
9	1.90 m (6 ft 3 in)	South Africa	Africa – CANA	12th
11	1.89 m (6 ft 2 in)	Kazakhstan	Asia – AASF	11th
12	1.79 m (5 ft 10 in)	Japan	Asia – AASF	10th

=== Number of left-handed players ===
Number of left-handed players (excluding goalkeepers)
Number of left-handers	Men's team	Confederation	Finish
3	Hungary	Europe – LEN	3rd
2	Croatia	Europe – LEN	5th
2	Serbia	Europe – LEN	1st
1	Italy	Europe – LEN	7th
1	Japan	Asia – AASF	10th
1	Montenegro	Europe – LEN	8th
1	Spain	Europe – LEN	4th
0	Australia	Oceania – OSA	9th
0	Greece	Europe – LEN	2nd
0	Kazakhstan	Asia – AASF	11th
0	South Africa	Africa – CANA	12th
0	United States	Americas – UANA	6th

== Player statistics ==
=== Age records ===
Top 10 oldest players (as of 23 July 2021)
Rk	Age	Player	Men's team	Pos	Date of birth
1	41 years, 7 days	Daniel López	Spain	GK	16 July 1980
2	40 years, 335 days	Donn Stewart	South Africa	CB	22 August 1980
3	38 years, 87 days	Jesse Smith	United States	CB	27 April 1983
4	37 years, 350 days	Gojko Pijetlović	Serbia	GK	7 August 1983
5	37 years, 199 days	Xavier García	Croatia	D	5 January 1984
6	37 years, 141 days	Norbert Hosnyánszky	Hungary	CB	4 March 1984
7	37 years, 55 days	Pietro Figlioli	Italy	D	29 May 1984
8	36 years, 364 days	Viktor Nagy	Hungary	GK	24 July 1984
9	36 years, 208 days	Draško Brguljan	Montenegro	D	27 December 1984
10	36 years, 174 days	Branislav Mitrović	Serbia	GK	30 January 1985

Top 10 youngest players (as of 23 July 2021)
Rk	Age	Player	Men's team	Pos	Date of birth
1	18 years, 51 days	Danil Artyukh	Kazakhstan	CB	2 June 2003
2	19 years, 9 days	Unai Aguirre	Spain	GK	14 July 2002
3	20 years, 130 days	Miroslav Perković	Montenegro	CF	15 March 2001
4	20 years, 275 days	Bernat Sanahuja	Spain	D	21 October 2000
5	21 years, 69 days	Ross Stone	South Africa	D	15 May 2000
6	21 years, 103 days	Yusuke Inaba	Japan	D	11 April 2000
7	21 years, 161 days	Yaseen Margro	South Africa	D	12 February 2000
8	21 years, 199 days	Hannes Daube	United States	D	5 January 2000
9	21 years, 246 days	Konstantinos Gkiouvetsis	Greece	D	19 November 1999
10	21 years, 276 days	Toi Suzuki	Japan	D	20 October 1999

== Coach statistics ==
=== Age ===
Age of head coaches (as of 23 July 2021)
Rk	Age	Head coach	Nationality	Date of birth	Men's team
1	58 years, 27 days	Sandro Campagna	Italy	26 June 1963	Italy
2	54 years, 27 days	Yoji Omoto	Japan	26 June 1967	Japan
3	52 years, 14 days	Thodoris Vlachos	Greece	9 July 1969	Greece
4	51 years, 165 days	Ivica Tucak	Croatia	8 February 1970	Croatia
5	50 years, 362 days	Dejan Udovičić	Serbia	26 July 1970	United States
6	50 years, 76 days	Elvis Fatović	Croatia	8 May 1971	Australia
7	47 years, 6 days	Tamás Märcz	Hungary	17 July 1974	Hungary
8	46 years, 90 days	Dejan Savić	Serbia	24 April 1975	Serbia
9	44 years, 202 days	David Martín	Spain	2 January 1977	Spain
10	40 years, 175 days	Vladimir Gojković	Montenegro	29 January 1981	Montenegro
11	38 years, 284 days	Paul Martin	South Africa	12 October 1982	South Africa
12	37 years, 193 days	Nemanja Knežević	Montenegro	11 January 1984	Kazakhstan

== See also ==
- Water polo at the 2020 Summer Olympics – Women's team rosters

== Sources ==
- Water Polo – Athlete Profiles | Tokyo 2020 Olympics
- Water Polo – Olympic Reports | Tokyo 2020 Olympics
- Water Polo – Official Results Book | Tokyo 2020 Olympics (archive)
- Water Polo – Team Rosters | Tokyo 2020 Olympics
  - Australia, Croatia, Greece, Hungary, Italy, Japan, Kazakhstan, Montenegro, Serbia, South Africa, Spain, United States
