= Maggie Steffens =

American water polo player (born 1993)

Personal information
- Full name: Margaret Ann Steffens
- Nationality: American
- Born: June 4, 1993 (age 33) San Ramon, California, U.S.
- Height: 5 ft 8 in (173 cm)
- Weight: 165 lb (75 kg)

Sport
- Country: United States
- Sport: Water polo
- College team: Stanford University
Medal record
Woman's water polo
Representing the United States
Olympic Games
Gold medal – first place	2012 London	Team
Gold medal – first place	2016 Rio de Janeiro	Team
Gold medal – first place	2020 Tokyo	Team
World Championships
Gold medal – first place	2015 Kazan	Team
Gold medal – first place	2017 Budapest	Team
Gold medal – first place	2019 Gwangju	Team
Gold medal – first place	2022 Budapest	Team
Gold medal – first place	2024 Doha	Team
World Cup
Gold medal – first place	2010 Christchurch
Gold medal – first place	2014 Khanty-Mansiysk
Gold medal – first place	2018 Surgut
Gold medal – first place	2023 Long Beach
World League
Gold medal – first place	2010 La Jolla
Gold medal – first place	2011 Tianjin
Gold medal – first place	2012 Changshu
Gold medal – first place	2014 Kunshan
Gold medal – first place	2015 Shanghai
Gold medal – first place	2016 Shanghai
Gold medal – first place	2017 Shanghai
Gold medal – first place	2018 Kunshan
Gold medal – first place	2019 Budapest
Gold medal – first place	2021 Athens
Bronze medal – third place	2013 Beijing
Pan American Games
Gold medal – first place	2011 Guadalajara	Team
Gold medal – first place	2015 Toronto	Team
Gold medal – first place	2019 Lima	Team
- Updated on February 16, 2024

Margaret Ann Steffens (born June 4, 1993) is an American professional water polo player. She won the gold medal with the United States at the 2012, 2016 and 2020 Summer Olympics. At the 2020 Summer Olympics, Steffens set a new Olympic record for the most goals scored by an individual player in women's water polo at the Olympic Games.

== Early career ==
Steffens played water polo at Monte Vista High School (Danville, California) and helped the team win their league championship in 2007, 2008, and 2009. She also played for Diablo Water Polo in Alamo, California.

== College career ==
Steffens attended Stanford University, playing on the women's water polo team from 2013 to 2017. Steffens lead the team to NCAA championships in 2014, 2015, and 2017, and to second-place finishes in 2013 and 2016.

In 2015, Steffens scored four goals in the semifinal game against USC, which Stanford won, 9–8. In 2017, she scored three goals in Stanford's 8-7 championship victory against UCLA, including the winning goal with 9 seconds left. In 2015 and again in 2017 she was named the MVP of the NCAA tournament.

Steffens graduated from Stanford in June 2017 with a B.S. degree in Science, Technology, and Society.

== International career ==
Her first international appearance was at the 2009 FINA Junior Women's World Championships in Khanty-Mansiysk, Russia, finishing in third place.

Steffens also made her senior debut at the age of 16, at the 10th Holiday Cup in Newport Beach, California, from December 9 to 13, 2009, where she scored twice.

=== 2010 ===
Steffens played on the United States national water polo team which won the 2010 FINA World League Super Final and the 2010 FINA World Cup. She scored the winning goal against Australia in the final match of the FINA World League Super Final.

=== 2011 ===
In 2011, Steffens helped the U.S. win the 2011 FINA World League Super Final again. In the Pan American Games, she scored the winning goal in the shootout of the final match, as the U.S. defeated Canada.

=== 2012 ===
The U.S. won the FINA World League Super Final for the third straight year in 2012, and Steffens led the team with 11 goals.

==== 2012 Summer Olympics ====
2012 Summer Olympics
Gold medal – first place	tournament	team

In the first match of the Summer Olympics, Steffens scored seven goals to tie the Olympic single-game record. She scored 21 total goals in the Olympics, which set a new Olympic record for most goals scored in a women's water polo tournament, as the U.S. won the gold medal.

The gold medal Steffens helped win at the 2012 Summer Olympics was the first Olympic gold medal, men's or women's, won by the United States in the sport of water polo at an Olympic Games since the sport's debut at the Olympic Games.

She was named the Best Female Water Polo Player of 2012 by FINA and the 2012 female Water Polo Player of the Year by Swimming World Magazine.

=== 2016 ===
==== 2016 Summer Olympics ====
2016 Summer Olympics
Gold medal – first place	tournament	team

Steffens was the top goalscorer at the 2016 Olympics with 17 goals, as the U.S. again won the gold medal.

=== 2021 ===
==== 2020 Summer Olympics ====
===== Preliminary round =====
In the first match of the 2020 Summer Olympics water polo tournament in Tokyo, Japan on Saturday July 24, 2021, Steffens helped the USA team win against their opponent, team Japan, with a final score of 25 to 4. She tied for the spot of top scorer in the match with 5 goals. Her first goal was 21 seconds after the start of the match. The score of 25 to 4 set a new Olympic record in the winning margin for a tournament match in women's water polo, the record lasted a few hours until Spain won over South Africa with a score of 29 to 4.

In the second match of the tournament against team China, Steffens scored once and left the pool twice to receive medical attention after being cut on her nose. Eight of her teammates also scored goals and team USA won the match with a final score of 12 to 7.

Steffens chose to play in the third match of the preliminary round of competition against team Hungary, though the blow that had inflicted a cut on her nose in the match against team China had also broken her nose. She scored one goal for her team in the match against team Hungary, bringing her within four goals of becoming the highest scoring woman in the history of water polo at the Olympic Games. Team Hungary won the match with ten goals to team USA's nine goals.

In the fourth and final match of the preliminary round matches for team USA, Steffens contributed to final score of 18 to 5 that helped the team win against team ROC. In the match, Steffens scored her 49th goal at the Olympic Games and set a new Olympic record in the most goals scored by a female water player over the course of their athletic career competing at the Olympic Games.

===== Elimination rounds =====
2020 Summer Olympics
Gold medal – first place	tournament	team

In the quarterfinal match in the elimination rounds of competition, team USA competed against team Canada and won in a final score of 16 to 5 with Steffens scoring three of the goals for team USA. In the team USA semifinal match against team ROC, Steffens scored three of the goals for team USA, the team won with a final score of 15 to 11 and advanced to the gold medal match against team Spain. In the gold medal match, team USA won the gold medal in dominating fashion over Spain, 14 to 5, with Steffens scoring one of the goals for the team. The USA women's water polo team winning their third Olympic gold medal in a row was chosen by FINA as the number five moment from the 2020 Olympic Games.

== Club career ==
In January 2018, Steffens signed contract with Hungarian professional club UVSE from Budapest. On May 10, 2018, she won the Hungarian Championship.

In the summer of 2018, she transferred to Spanish Club Natació Sabadell winning three titles: Spanish Cup, Spanish Championship and LEN Euro League.

== Personal life ==
Steffens was born in San Ramon, California to Peggy Schnugg and Carlos Steffens. She is the youngest of four children (Jessica, Charlie and Teresa). Her father, a native of Puerto Rico, became interested in the sport of water polo after witnessing a match as a child in Puerto Rico. He played for Puerto Rico in three Pan American Games. Her father left the island and joined the water polo team of Berkeley, University of California where he became a three-time All-American, leading the California Golden Bears to the 1977 NCAA championship. In 1979, he was the PAC-10 player of the year in water polo.

Maggie Steffens lives in Danville, California. She became interested and was influenced in the sport of water polo mainly by her father and sister, Jessica Steffens, who is also on the United States national team.

Steffens became an advisor to women's sports website Just Women's Sports in 2020. She said her goal in working with the company was to increase the awareness of the number of female role models in sports.

== See also ==
- United States women's Olympic water polo team records and statistics
- List of Olympic champions in women's water polo
- List of Olympic medalists in water polo (women)
- List of women's Olympic water polo tournament top goalscorers
- List of world champions in women's water polo
- List of World Aquatics Championships medalists in water polo

Awards
Preceded by (Greece) Alexandra Asimaki (Spain) Jennifer Pareja	FINA Water Polo Player of the Year; 2012; 2014	Succeeded by (Spain) Jennifer Pareja; Incumbent
Preceded by (Canada) Krystina Alogbo (United States) Ashleigh Johnson	World Water Polo Player of the Year; 2012; 2017	Succeeded by (Spain) Jennifer Pareja (Netherlands) Sabrina van der Sloot
