= Swimming at the 2019 World Aquatics Championships – Women's 200 metre breaststroke =

Women's 200 metre breaststroke at the 2019 World Aquatics Championships
- Venue: Nambu University Municipal Aquatics Center
- Location: Gwangju, South Korea
- Dates: 25 July (heats and semifinals); 26 July (final)
- Competitors: 34 from 27 nations
- Winning time: 2:20.17

Medalists
gold medal	Yuliya Yefimova	Russia
silver medal	Tatjana Schoenmaker	South Africa
bronze medal	Sydney Pickrem	Canada

The Women's 200 metre breaststroke competition at the 2019 World Championships was held on 25 and 26 July 2019.

== Records ==
Prior to the competition, the existing world and championship records were as follows.

World record	Rikke Møller Pedersen (DEN)	2:19.11	Barcelona, Spain	1 August 2013
Competition record	Rikke Møller Pedersen (DEN)	2:19.11	Barcelona, Spain	1 August 2013

== Results ==
=== Heats ===
The heats were held on 25 July at 10:50.

Rank	Heat	Lane	Name	Nationality	Time	Notes
1	2	5	Sydney Pickrem	Canada	2:24.53	Q
2	3	5	Tatjana Schoenmaker	South Africa	2:24.66	Q
3	4	2	Kaylene Corbett	South Africa	2:24.83	Q
4	2	7	Lisa Mamie	Switzerland	2:24.93	Q, NR
5	4	3	Kelsey Wog	Canada	2:25.01	Q
5	4	4	Yuliya Yefimova	Russia	2:25.01	Q
7	2	2	Fanny Lecluyse	Belgium	2:25.05	Q
8	2	3	Molly Renshaw	Great Britain	2:25.17	Q
8	4	5	Micah Sumrall	United States	2:25.17	Q
10	2	6	Ye Shiwen	China	2:25.41	Q
11	2	4	Reona Aoki	Japan	2:25.93	Q
12	3	6	Maria Temnikova	Russia	2:25.98	Q
13	3	3	Jessica Vall	Spain	2:26.04	Q
14	3	8	Victoria Kaminskaya	Portugal	2:26.06	Q, NR
15	4	7	Jenna Strauch	Australia	2:26.25	Q
16	4	1	Back Su-yeon	South Korea	2:26.56	Q
17	3	2	Yu Jingyao	China	2:26.77	
18	3	1	Martina Carraro	Italy	2:27.41	
19	4	6	Marina García Urzainqui	Spain	2:27.46	
20	4	8	Viktoriya Zeynep Güneş	Turkey	2:27.67	
21	3	7	Jessica Hansen	Australia	2:29.18	
22	2	1	Kotryna Teterevkova	Lithuania	2:29.93	
23	2	8	Sophie Hansson	Sweden	2:29.97	
24	2	0	Weronika Hallmann	Poland	2:30.22	
25	2	9	Margaret Higgs	Bahamas	2:30.50	NR
26	4	0	Anastasia Gorbenko	Israel	2:30.67	
27	1	4	Jenna Laukkanen	Finland	2:31.68	
28	4	9	Alina Zmushka	Belarus	2:35.58	
29	1	5	María Jiménez	Mexico	2:37.49	
30	1	3	Amy Micallef	Malta	2:44.30	
31	1	6	Cheang Weng Lam	Macau	2:46.10	
32	1	2	Tilali Scanlan	American Samoa	2:52.56	
33	1	7	Sajina Aishath	Maldives	3:04.53	NR
	3	4	Lilly King	United States	DSQ	
	3	0	Niamh Coyne	Ireland	DNS	
	3	9	Jamie Yeung	Hong Kong	DNS	

=== Semifinals ===
The semifinals were held on 25 July at 21:21.

==== Semifinal 1 ====
Rank	Lane	Name	Nationality	Time	Notes
1	3	Yuliya Yefimova	Russia	2:21.20	Q
2	4	Tatjana Schoenmaker	South Africa	2:21.79	Q, AF
3	6	Molly Renshaw	Great Britain	2:23.16	Q
4	2	Ye Shiwen	China	2:23.49	Q
5	5	Lisa Mamie	Switzerland	2:24.47	NR
6	7	Maria Temnikova	Russia	2:24.55	
7	1	Victoria Kaminskaya	Portugal	2:25.67	NR
8	8	Back Su-yeon	South Korea	2:26.29	

==== Semifinal 2 ====
Rank	Lane	Name	Nationality	Time	Notes
1	4	Sydney Pickrem	Canada	2:23.11	Q
2	6	Fanny Lecluyse	Belgium	2:23.76	Q, NR
3	3	Kelsey Wog	Canada	2:24.17	Q
4	5	Kaylene Corbett	South Africa	2:24.18	Q
5	2	Micah Sumrall	United States	2:25.41	
6	8	Jenna Strauch	Australia	2:26.65	
7	7	Reona Aoki	Japan	2:27.95	
8	1	Jessica Vall	Spain	2:28.11	

=== Final ===
The final was held on 26 July at 20:50.

Rank	Lane	Name	Nationality	Time	Notes
1st place, gold medalist(s)	4	Yuliya Yefimova	Russia	2:20.17	
2nd place, silver medalist(s)	5	Tatjana Schoenmaker	South Africa	2:22.52	
3rd place, bronze medalist(s)	3	Sydney Pickrem	Canada	2:22.90	
4	2	Ye Shiwen	China	2:23.15	
5	6	Molly Renshaw	Great Britain	2:23.78	
6	1	Kelsey Wog	Canada	2:25.14	
7	7	Fanny Lecluyse	Belgium	2:25.23	
8	8	Kaylene Corbett	South Africa	2:26.62	
