= Boati Motau =

South African water polo player

Boati Moloko Motau
Personal information
- Born: 2002
- Height: 5 ft 4 in (163 cm)
- Weight: 120 lb (54 kg)

Sport
- Country: South Africa
- Sport: Water polo
- Position: Wing
- Club: OJ Eagles

Boati Moloko Motau (born 2002) is a South African water polo player.

She was part of the South Africa women's national water polo team at the 2020 Tokyo Summer Olympics, where they ranked 10th.

== Career statistics ==
Event	Country	Rank	Date	Points
FINA World Women's Junior Waterpolo Championships 2019	POR	12	14 SEP 2019	13 - 12
Tokyo Summer Olympic Games 2020	JAP	10	01 AUG 2021	14 - 1
