= Maiko Hashida =

Japanese water polo player (born 2000)

Personal information
- Nationality: Japanese
- Born: 23 December 2000 (age 25)
- Height: 164 cm (65 in)
- Weight: 58 kg (128 lb)

Sport
- Sport: Water polo
Medal record
Representing Japan
Asian Games
Bronze medal – third place	2018 Jakarta	Team competition

Maiko Hashida (橋田 舞子; born 23 December 2000) is a Japanese water polo player. She was selected to the Japan women's national water polo team, for the 2020 Summer Olympics.

She participated at the 2018 Asian Games, and 2019 FINA Women's Water Polo World League.
