= Delaine Mentoor =

South African water polo player and coach

Personal information
- Born: May 26, 1993 (age 32)

Sport
- Sport: Water polo

Delaine Mentoor (born 26 May 1993) is a South African water polo coach. She was the head coach of the South Africa women's national water polo team at the 2020 Summer Olympics, becoming the first female head coach in the men's and women's Olympic water polo tournaments.
