= Kyoko Kudo =

Japanese water polo player

Personal information
- Nationality: Japanese
- Born: 10 February 2001 (age 25)
- Height: 165 cm (65 in)
- Weight: 56 kg (123 lb)

Sport
- Sport: Water polo

Kyoko Kudo (工藤 恭子, Kudō Kyōko; born 10 February 2001) is a Japanese water polo player. She was selected to the Japan women's national water polo team, for the 2020 Summer Olympics.

She participated at the 2019 Summer Universiade, 2019 FINA World Women's Junior Waterpolo Championships, and 2019 FINA Women's Water Polo World League.
