= Yaseen Margro =

South African water polo player

Personal information
- Nationality: South Africa
- Born: 12 February 2000 (age 25)

Sport
- Sport: Water polo

Yaseen Margro (born 12 February 2000) is a South African water polo player. He competed in the 2020 Summer Olympics.
