= Nina Smith =

Danish economist and academic

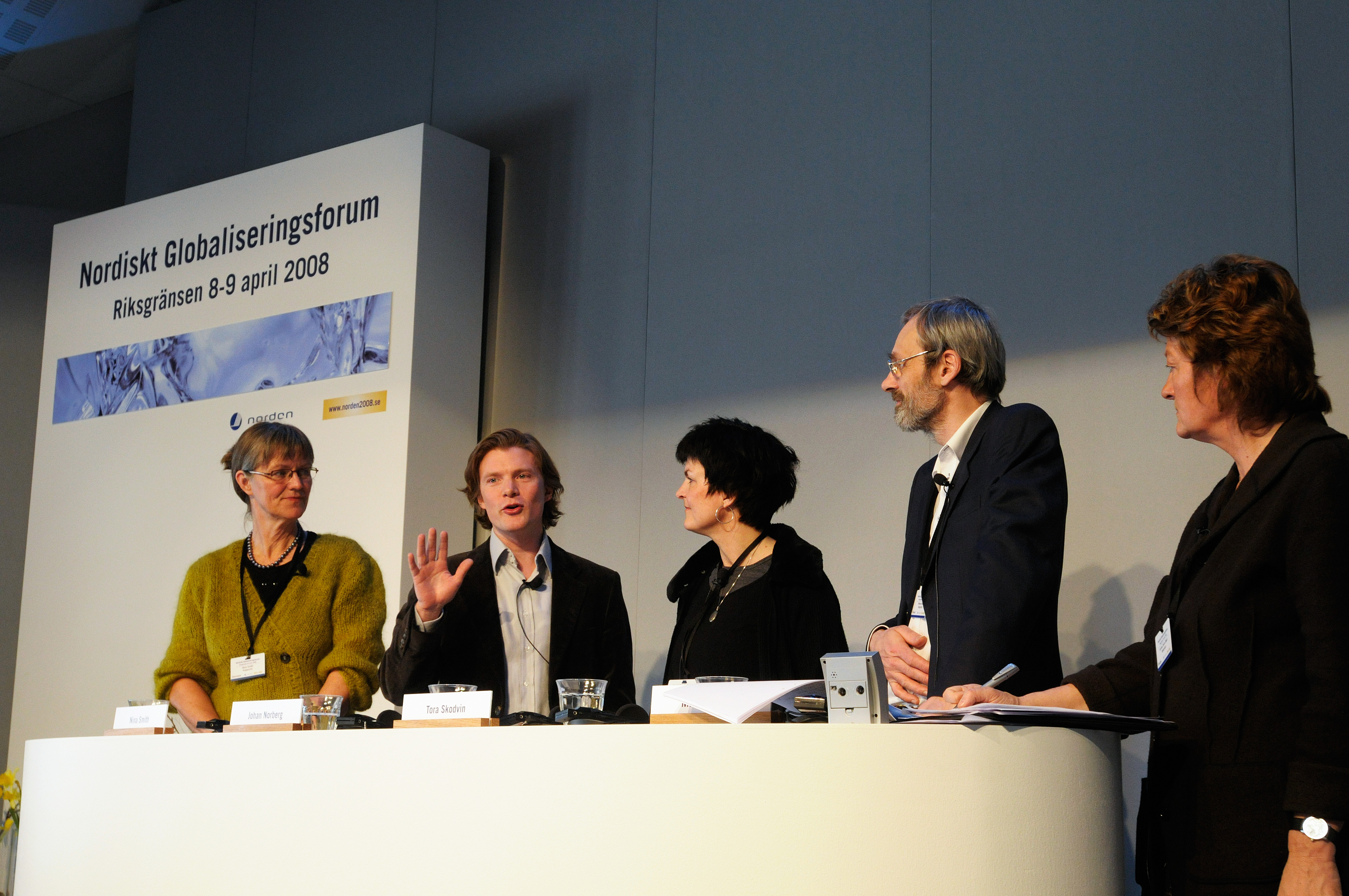
Nina Smith (left) at the Nordic Globalization Forum (2008)

Nina Smith née Gotfred-Rasmussen (born 1955) is a prominent Danish economist. Since 2005, she has been Professor of Economics and Business at Aarhus University. Smith has held a number of major educational and advisory positions, including research professor at the German Institute for Economic Research and head of the board of the Independent Research Fund Denmark. As of July 2021, she serves on the boards of several leading financial companies in Denmark such as Nykredit.

== Biography ==
Born on 17 October 1955 in the village of Ølsted near Broby on the island of Funen, Nina Gottfred-Rasmussen is the daughter of the farmer Laurits Gotfred-Rasmussen and his wife Birthe née Nielsen. On 17 August 1978, she married the research leader Valdemar Smith (born 1954). The couple have four children: Hans Martin (1979), Christian (1983), Anne Marie (1985) and Frederik (1994).

On matriculating from Vestyfyens Gymnasium (1975), Smith graduated in economics at Aarhus University in 1981. She taught at the Southern Jutland School of Business (1982–86) until she was appointed associate professor in the Department of Political Science at Aarhus University. In 1990, she moved to the Aarhus School of Business where she received a professorship in 1993. After holding research positions in Germany at IZA and CIM, in 2001 she was appointed research professor at DIW Berlin. In 2009, she was nominated Professor of Economics and Business at Aarhus University.

Smith has been active in many government-based commissions in Denmark, most recently as chair of the Reform Commission (Reform Kommissionen), which plans to reduce inequalities in the economic sphere. She has explained that in view of Denmark's large public sector interests, action on public finance needs to be taken over the next 10 to 20 years. "This means that in future there will be considerable pressure on taxes," she commented in May 2021.

Nina Smith has received many awards for her contributions, including Knight of the Order of the Dannebrog.
