= Nemanja Knežević =

Montenegrin water polo player and coach

Personal information
- Born: January 11, 1984 (age 42)

Sport
- Sport: Water polo

Nemanja Knežević (born 11 January 1984) is a Montenegrin water polo coach. He was the head coach of the Kazakhstan men's national water polo team at the 2020 Summer Olympics.
