= Stanislav Shvedov =

Kazakhstani water polo player

Personal information
- Native name: Станислав Александрович Шведов
- Full name: Stanislav Aleksandrovich Shvedov
- Born: 24 November 1998 (age 27) Almaty, Kazakhstan

Sport
- Country: Kazakhstan
- Sport: Water polo

Stanislav Shvedov (Станислав Шведов, born 24 November 1998) is a Kazakhstani water polo player. He competed in the men's tournament at the 2020 Summer Olympics.

His father Alexandr represented Kazakhstan in water polo at three Olympics (2000, 2004, 2012).
