= Yanah Gerber =

South African water polo player

Personal information
- Nationality: South African
- Born: 16 March 2001 (age 24)

Sport
- Sport: Water polo

Yanah Gerber (born 16 March 2001) is a South African water polo player. She competed in the 2020 Summer Olympics.
