= Paul Martin (water polo) =

South African water polo player and coach

Personal information
- Born: October 12, 1982 (age 43)

Sport
- Sport: Water polo

Paul Martin (born 12 October 1982) is a South African water polo coach. He was the head coach of the South Africa men's national water polo team at the 2020 Summer Olympics.
