= Montenegro at the 2020 Summer Olympics =

- IOC code: MNE
- NOC: Montenegrin Olympic Committee
- Website: www.cok.me (in Montenegrin)

in Tokyo, Japan 23 July 2021 – 8 August 2021
- Competitors: 34 in 7 sports
- Flag bearers (opening): Jovanka Radičević; Draško Brguljan
- Flag bearer (closing): Dušan Matković
- Medals: Gold 0 Silver 0 Bronze 0 Total 0

Summer Olympics appearances (overview)
- 2008; 2012; 2016; 2020; 2024

Other related appearances
- Yugoslavia (1920–1992W); Independent Olympic Participants (1992S); Serbia and Montenegro (1996–2006)

Montenegro competed at the 2020 Summer Olympics in Tokyo. Originally scheduled to take place from 24 July to 9 August 2020, the Games were postponed to 23 July to 8 August 2021, because of the COVID-19 pandemic. It was the nation's fourth consecutive appearance at the Summer Olympics since gaining independence in 2006.

== Competitors ==
The following is the list of number of competitors in the Games. Note that reserves in handball are not counted:

| Sport | Men | Women | Total |
|---|---|---|---|
| Athletics | 1 | 1 | 2 |
| Handball | 0 | 14 | 14 |
| Judo | 0 | 1 | 1 |
| Sailing | 1 | 0 | 1 |
| Shooting | 0 | 1 | 1 |
| Swimming | 1 | 1 | 2 |
| Water polo | 13 | 0 | 13 |
| Total | 16 | 18 | 34 |

== Athletics ==
Montenegrin athletes further achieved the entry standards, either by qualifying time or by world ranking, in the following track and field events (up to a maximum of 3 athletes in each event):

Key

- Note–Ranks given for track events are within the athlete's heat only
- Q = Qualified for the next round
- q = Qualified for the next round as a fastest loser or, in field events, by position without achieving the qualifying target
- NR = National record
- N/A = Round not applicable for the event
- Bye = Athlete not required to compete in round

Field events

| Athlete | Event | Qualification | | Final | |
| Athlete | Event | Distance | Position | Distance | Position |
|---|---|---|---|---|---|
| Danijel Furtula | Men's discus throw | 59.93 | 24 | Did not advance | |
| Marija Vuković | Women's high jump | 1.95 | =1 Q | 1.96 | 9 |

== Handball ==
Summary

Key:
- ET – After extra time.
- P – Match decided by penalty-shootout.

| Team | Event | Group stage | | | | | | Quarterfinal | Semifinal | Final / BM | |
| Team | Event | Opposition Score | Opposition Score | Opposition Score | Opposition Score | Opposition Score | Rank | Opposition Score | Opposition Score | Opposition Score | Rank |
|---|---|---|---|---|---|---|---|---|---|---|---|
| Montenegro women's | Women's tournament | Angola; W 33–22 | Japan; L 26–29 | Norway; L 23–35 | South Korea; W 28–26 | Netherlands; L 29–30 | 3 QF | ROC; L 26–32 | Did not advance | | |

=== Women's tournament ===
Montenegro women's national handball team qualified for the Olympics by securing a top-two finish at the Podgorica leg of the 2020 IHF Olympic Qualification Tournament.

Team roster

The squad was announced on 9 July 2021.

Head coach: Bojana Popović

| No. | Pos. | Name | Date of birth (age) | Height | App. | Goals | Club |
|---|---|---|---|---|---|---|---|
| 1 | GK | Marina Rajčić | 24 August 1993 (aged 27) | 1.78 m | 119 | 2 | (Turkey) Kastamonu |
| 4 | RW | Jovanka Radičević | 23 October 1986 (aged 34) | 1.69 m | 169 | 935 | (Turkey) Kastamonu |
| 9 | LB | Đurđina Jauković | 24 February 1997 (aged 24) | 1.85 m | 74 | 250 | (France) Brest Bretagne |
| 10 | CB | Matea Pletikosić | 24 April 1998 (aged 23) | 1.69 m | 10 | 5 | (Slovenia) RK Krim |
| 12 | GK | Anastasija Babović | 13 December 2000 (aged 20) | 1.78 m | 11 | 1 | (Montenegro) ŽRK Budućnost |
| 13 | LW | Dijana Mugoša | 22 October 1995 (aged 25) | 1.67 m | 24 | 12 | (Croatia) RK Podravka |
| 15 | RB | Andrea Klikovac | 5 May 1991 (aged 30) | 1.75 m | 87 | 54 | (Romania) CSM București |
| 16 | GK | Ljubica Nenezić | 15 January 1997 (aged 24) | 1.79 m | 37 | 0 | (Romania) SCM Gloria Buzău |
| 34 | P | Tatjana Brnović | 9 November 1998 (aged 22) | 1.84 m | 34 | 59 | (Montenegro) ŽRK Budućnost |
| 55 | LW | Ivona Pavićević | 21 April 1996 (aged 25) | 1.67 m | 42 | 23 | (Montenegro) ŽRK Budućnost |
| 66 | P | Ema Ramusović | 28 November 1996 (aged 24) | 1.86 m | 68 | 76 | (Romania) CSM București |
| 77 | LW | Majda Mehmedović | 25 May 1990 (aged 31) | 1.69 m | 128 | 347 | (Turkey) Kastamonu |
| 80 | LB | Jelena Despotović | 30 April 1994 (aged 27) | 1.83 m | 88 | 113 | (Hungary) Győri Audi ETO KC |
| 96 | CB | Itana Grbić | 1 September 1996 (aged 24) | 1.69 m | 59 | 72 | (Montenegro) ŽRK Budućnost |
| 97 | P | Nikolina Vukčević | 28 July 2000 (aged 20) | 1.79 m | 13 | 5 | (Montenegro) ŽRK Budućnost |

Group play

| Pos | Team | Pld | W | D | L | GF | GA | GD | Pts | Qualification |
|---|---|---|---|---|---|---|---|---|---|---|
| 1 | Norway | 5 | 5 | 0 | 0 | 170 | 123 | +47 | 10 | Quarter-finals |
| 2 | Netherlands | 5 | 4 | 0 | 1 | 169 | 143 | +26 | 8 | Quarter-finals |
| 3 | Montenegro | 5 | 2 | 0 | 3 | 139 | 142 | −3 | 4 | Quarter-finals |
| 4 | South Korea | 5 | 1 | 1 | 3 | 147 | 165 | −18 | 3 (Note: South Korea 31–31 Angola) | Quarter-finals |
| 5 | Angola | 5 | 1 | 1 | 3 | 130 | 156 | −26 | 3 | |
| 6 | Japan (H) | 5 | 1 | 0 | 4 | 124 | 150 | −26 | 2 | |

Source: Tokyo 2020 and IHF
Rules for classification: 1) Points; 2) Head-to-head points; 3) Head-to-head goal difference; 4) Head-to-head goals scored; 5) Goal difference; 6) Goals scored; 7) Draw.
(H) Hosts
Notes:

| 25 July 2021; 14:15 | Montenegro | 33–22 | Angola | Yoyogi National Gymnasium, Tokyo; Referees: Alpaidze, Berezkina (RUS) |
| 25 July 2021; 14:15 | Radičević 12 | (13–12) | Kamalandua 6 | Yoyogi National Gymnasium, Tokyo; Referees: Alpaidze, Berezkina (RUS) |
| 25 July 2021; 14:15 | 2× (yellow card) 3× (suspension) | Report | 5× (suspension) | Yoyogi National Gymnasium, Tokyo; Referees: Alpaidze, Berezkina (RUS) |

| 27 July 2021; 09:00 | Japan | 29–26 | Montenegro | Yoyogi National Gymnasium, Tokyo; Referees: Alpaidze, Berezkina (RUS) |
| 27 July 2021; 09:00 | Hara, Ikehara 6 | (14–13) | Brnović 6 | Yoyogi National Gymnasium, Tokyo; Referees: Alpaidze, Berezkina (RUS) |
| 27 July 2021; 09:00 | 1× (yellow card) 8× (suspension) 1× (red card) | Report | 2× (yellow card) 3× (suspension) | Yoyogi National Gymnasium, Tokyo; Referees: Alpaidze, Berezkina (RUS) |

| 29 July 2021; 16:15 | Montenegro | 23–35 | Norway | Yoyogi National Gymnasium, Tokyo; Referees: Bonaventura, Bonaventura (FRA) |
| 29 July 2021; 16:15 | Radičević 6 | (13–13) | Mørk, Reistad 7 | Yoyogi National Gymnasium, Tokyo; Referees: Bonaventura, Bonaventura (FRA) |
| 29 July 2021; 16:15 | 2× (yellow card) 3× (suspension) | Report | 3× (suspension) | Yoyogi National Gymnasium, Tokyo; Referees: Bonaventura, Bonaventura (FRA) |

| 31 July 2021; 11:00 | Montenegro | 28–26 | South Korea | Yoyogi National Gymnasium, Tokyo; Referees: El-Saied, El-Saied (EGY) |
| 31 July 2021; 11:00 | Radičević 6 | (13–11) | Lee 10 | Yoyogi National Gymnasium, Tokyo; Referees: El-Saied, El-Saied (EGY) |
| 31 July 2021; 11:00 | 2× (yellow card) 4× (suspension) | Report | 3× (suspension) | Yoyogi National Gymnasium, Tokyo; Referees: El-Saied, El-Saied (EGY) |

| 2 August 2021; 19:30 | Netherlands | 30–29 | Montenegro | Yoyogi National Gymnasium, Tokyo; Referees: Fonseca, Santos (POR) |
| 2 August 2021; 19:30 | Van der Heijden 5 | (17–12) | Radičević 8 | Yoyogi National Gymnasium, Tokyo; Referees: Fonseca, Santos (POR) |
| 2 August 2021; 19:30 | 1× (yellow card) 5× (suspension) | Report | 2× (yellow card) 3× (suspension) | Yoyogi National Gymnasium, Tokyo; Referees: Fonseca, Santos (POR) |

Quarterfinal

| 4 August 2021; 09:30 | Montenegro | 26–32 | ROC | Yoyogi National Gymnasium, Tokyo; Referees: Kurtagic, Wetterwik (SWE) |
| 4 August 2021; 09:30 | Radičević 10 | (15–17) | Vyakhireva 8 | Yoyogi National Gymnasium, Tokyo; Referees: Kurtagic, Wetterwik (SWE) |
| 4 August 2021; 09:30 | 1× (yellow card) 1× (suspension) | Report | 7× (suspension) | Yoyogi National Gymnasium, Tokyo; Referees: Kurtagic, Wetterwik (SWE) |

== Judo ==
| Athlete | Event | Round of 32 | Round of 16 | Quarterfinals | Semifinals | Repechage | Final / BM | |
| Athlete | Event | Opposition Result | Opposition Result | Opposition Result | Opposition Result | Opposition Result | Opposition Result | Rank |
|---|---|---|---|---|---|---|---|---|
| Jovana Peković | Women's −78 kg | Prodan (CRO); L 00–01 | Did not advance | | | | | |

== Sailing ==
Montenegro received an invitation from the Tripartite Commission to send a sailor in the Laser class to the Enoshima regatta.

| Athlete | Event | Race | | | | | | | | | | | Net points | Final rank |
| Athlete | Event | 1 | 2 | 3 | 4 | 5 | 6 | 7 | 8 | 9 | 10 | M* | Net points | Final rank |
|---|---|---|---|---|---|---|---|---|---|---|---|---|---|---|
| Milivoj Dukić | Men's Laser | ~~29~~ | 1 | 12 | 26 | 5 | 11 | 15 | 27 | 26 | 14 | EL | 137 | 17 |

M = Medal race; EL = Eliminated – did not advance into the medal race

== Shooting ==
Montenegro received an invitation from ISSF to send a female air pistol shooter to the Olympics, based on her minimum qualifying score (MQS) attained on or before June 5, 2021.

| Athlete | Event | Qualification | | Final | |
| Athlete | Event | Points | Rank | Points | Rank |
|---|---|---|---|---|---|
| Jelena Pantović | Women's 10 m air pistol | 534 | 53 | Did not advance | |

== Swimming ==
Montenegro received a universality invitation from FINA to send two top-ranked swimmers (one per gender) in their respective individual events to the Olympics, based on the FINA Points System of June 28, 2021.

| Athlete | Event | Heat | | Semifinal | | Final | |
| Athlete | Event | Time | Rank | Time | Rank | Time | Rank |
|---|---|---|---|---|---|---|---|
| Boško Radulović | Men's 100 m freestyle | 53.60 | 61 | Did not advance | | | |
| Andela Antunović | Women's 100 m freestyle | 1:00.01 | 49 | Did not advance | | | |

== Water polo ==
Summary

Key:
- FT – After full time.
- P – Match decided by penalty-shootout.

| Team | Event | Group stage | | | | | | Quarterfinal | Classification 5th–8th | 7th Place Game | |
| Team | Event | Opposition Score | Opposition Score | Opposition Score | Opposition Score | Opposition Score | Rank | Opposition Score | Opposition Score | Opposition Score | Rank |
|---|---|---|---|---|---|---|---|---|---|---|---|
| Montenegro men's | Men's tournament | Australia; W 15–10 | Spain; L 6–8 | Croatia; L 8–13 | Kazakhstan; W 19–12 | Serbia; L 6–13 | 4 QF | Greece; L 4–10 | Croatia; L 10–12 | Italy; L 17–18 | 8 |

=== Men's tournament ===
Montenegro men's national water polo team qualified for the Olympics by advancing to the final match of the 2020 World Qualification Tournament in Rotterdam, Netherlands.

Team roster

Montenegro's final squad was announced on 8 July 2021.

Head coach: Vladimir Gojković

| No. | Player | Pos. | L/R | Height | Weight | Date of birth (age) | Apps | OG/ Goals | Club | Ref |
|---|---|---|---|---|---|---|---|---|---|---|
| 1 | Slaven Kandić | GK | R | 1.97 m (6 ft 6 in) | 99 kg (218 lb) | 2 April 1991 (aged 30) | 68 | 0/0 | (France) Pays d'Aix | |
| 2 | Draško Brguljan (C) | D | R | 1.94 m (6 ft 4 in) | 92 kg (203 lb) | 27 December 1984 (aged 36) | 347 | 3/14 | (Hungary) Vasas | |
| 3 | Miroslav Perković | CF | R | 2.02 m (6 ft 8 in) | 109 kg (240 lb) | 15 March 2001 (aged 20) | 14 | 0/0 | (Montenegro) Primorac Kotor | |
| 4 | Marko Petković | D | R | 1.89 m (6 ft 2 in) | 85 kg (187 lb) | 3 March 1989 (aged 32) | 72 | 0/0 | (Montenegro) Jadran Herceg Novi | |
| 5 | Uroš Čučković | CB | R | 2.00 m (6 ft 7 in) | 102 kg (225 lb) | 25 April 1990 (aged 31) | 140 | 1/1 | (France) Marseille | |
| 6 | Vlado Popadić | CB | R | 1.87 m (6 ft 2 in) | 89 kg (196 lb) | 25 April 1996 (aged 25) | 44 | 0/0 | (France) Pays d'Aix | |
| 7 | Stefan Vidović | D | R | 1.87 m (6 ft 2 in) | 85 kg (187 lb) | 8 August 1992 (aged 28) | 72 | 0/0 | (Italy) Ortigia | |
| 8 | Aleksa Ukropina | D | L | 1.96 m (6 ft 5 in) | 100 kg (220 lb) | 28 September 1998 (aged 22) | 62 | 0/0 | (Serbia) Radnički Kragujevac | |
| 9 | Aleksandar Ivović | CB | R | 1.97 m (6 ft 6 in) | 108 kg (238 lb) | 24 February 1986 (aged 35) | 299 | 3/39 | (Italy) Pro Recco | |
| 10 | Vladan Spaić | CF | R | 1.89 m (6 ft 2 in) | 103 kg (227 lb) | 18 June 1997 (aged 24) | 58 | 0/0 | (France) Marseille | |
| 11 | Dušan Matković | D | R | 1.90 m (6 ft 3 in) | 80 kg (176 lb) | 1 February 1999 (aged 22) | 23 | 0/0 | (Montenegro) Primorac Kotor | |
| 12 | Dušan Banićević | CB | R | 1.89 m (6 ft 2 in) | 95 kg (209 lb) | 12 October 1998 (aged 22) | 10 | 0/0 | (Spain) Sabadell | |
| 13 | Petar Tešanović | GK | R | 1.95 m (6 ft 5 in) | 91 kg (201 lb) | 26 November 1998 (aged 22) | 18 | 0/0 | (Italy) Brescia | |
| Average | | | | 1.93 m (6 ft 4 in) | 95 kg (209 lb) | 27 years, 120 days | 94 | | | |

Note: Age as of 23 July 2021
Source: Montenegro Men | Tokyo 2020 Olympics Archived 2021-07-22 at the Wayback Machine

Group play

| Pos | Team | Pld | W | D | L | GF | GA | GD | Pts | Qualification |
|---|---|---|---|---|---|---|---|---|---|---|
| 1 | Spain | 5 | 5 | 0 | 0 | 61 | 31 | +30 | 10 | Quarterfinals |
| 2 | Croatia | 5 | 3 | 0 | 2 | 62 | 46 | +16 | 6 (Note: Croatia 14–12 Serbia) | Quarterfinals |
| 3 | Serbia | 5 | 3 | 0 | 2 | 70 | 46 | +24 | 6 | Quarterfinals |
| 4 | Montenegro | 5 | 2 | 0 | 3 | 54 | 56 | −2 | 4 (Note: Australia 10–15 Montenegro) | Quarterfinals |
| 5 | Australia | 5 | 2 | 0 | 3 | 49 | 60 | −11 | 4 | |
| 6 | Kazakhstan | 5 | 0 | 0 | 5 | 35 | 92 | −57 | 0 | |

Source: Tokyo 2020 and FINA
Rules for classification: 1) Points; 2) Head-to-head points; 3) Head-to-head goal difference; 4) Head-to-head goals scored; 5) Goal difference.
Notes:

| 25 July 2021; 15:30 v | Report | Australia | 10–15 | Montenegro | Tokyo Tatsumi International Swimming Center; Referees: Adrian Alexandrescu (ROU), Alessandro Severo (ITA) |
| 25 July 2021; 15:30 v | Report | Score by quarters: 5–4, 2–2, 1–4, 2–5 | | | Tokyo Tatsumi International Swimming Center; Referees: Adrian Alexandrescu (ROU), Alessandro Severo (ITA) |
| 25 July 2021; 15:30 v | Report | Campbell 3 | Goals | Ukropina 4 | Tokyo Tatsumi International Swimming Center; Referees: Adrian Alexandrescu (ROU), Alessandro Severo (ITA) |

| 27 July 2021; 11:30 v | Report | Montenegro | 6–8 | Spain | Tokyo Tatsumi International Swimming Center; Referees: Sébastien Dervieux (FRA), Georgios Stavridis (GRE) |
| 27 July 2021; 11:30 v | Report | Score by quarters: 2–3, 1–2, 2–2, 1–1 | | | Tokyo Tatsumi International Swimming Center; Referees: Sébastien Dervieux (FRA), Georgios Stavridis (GRE) |
| 27 July 2021; 11:30 v | Report | Matković 3 | Goals | three players 2 | Tokyo Tatsumi International Swimming Center; Referees: Sébastien Dervieux (FRA), Georgios Stavridis (GRE) |

| 29 July 2021; 15:30 v | Report | Croatia | 13–8 | Montenegro | Tokyo Tatsumi International Swimming Center; Referees: Arkadiy Voevodin (RUS), György Kun (HUN) |
| 29 July 2021; 15:30 v | Report | Score by quarters: 1–1, 6–4, 4–3, 2–0 | | | Tokyo Tatsumi International Swimming Center; Referees: Arkadiy Voevodin (RUS), György Kun (HUN) |
| 29 July 2021; 15:30 v | Report | Fatović 3 | Goals | three players 2 | Tokyo Tatsumi International Swimming Center; Referees: Arkadiy Voevodin (RUS), György Kun (HUN) |

| 31 July 2021; 10:00 v | Report | Montenegro | 19–12 | Kazakhstan | Tokyo Tatsumi International Swimming Center; Referees: Frank Ohme (GER), Georgios Stavridis (GRE) |
| 31 July 2021; 10:00 v | Report | Score by quarters: 5–3, 6–3, 3–3, 5–3 | | | Tokyo Tatsumi International Swimming Center; Referees: Frank Ohme (GER), Georgios Stavridis (GRE) |
| 31 July 2021; 10:00 v | Report | three players 4 | Goals | Ruday 3 | Tokyo Tatsumi International Swimming Center; Referees: Frank Ohme (GER), Georgios Stavridis (GRE) |

| 2 August 2021; 14:00 v | Report | Serbia | 13–6 | Montenegro | Tokyo Tatsumi International Swimming Center; Referees: Alessandro Severo (ITA), Frank Ohme (GER) |
| 2 August 2021; 14:00 v | Report | Score by quarters: 6–1, 2–1, 3–2, 2–2 | | | Tokyo Tatsumi International Swimming Center; Referees: Alessandro Severo (ITA), Frank Ohme (GER) |
| 2 August 2021; 14:00 v | Report | Filipović 3 | Goals | Ivović 3 | Tokyo Tatsumi International Swimming Center; Referees: Alessandro Severo (ITA), Frank Ohme (GER) |

Quarterfinal

| 4 August 2021; 15:30 v | Report | Greece | 10–4 | Montenegro | Tokyo Tatsumi International Swimming Center; Referees: Adrian Alexandrescu (ROU), Alessandro Severo (ITA) |
| 4 August 2021; 15:30 v | Report | Score by quarters: 1–0, 2–1, 3–1, 4–2 | | | Tokyo Tatsumi International Swimming Center; Referees: Adrian Alexandrescu (ROU), Alessandro Severo (ITA) |
| 4 August 2021; 15:30 v | Report | Genidounias 5 | Goals | Ivović 2 | Tokyo Tatsumi International Swimming Center; Referees: Adrian Alexandrescu (ROU), Alessandro Severo (ITA) |

5–8th place semifinal

| 6 August 2021; 14:00 v | Report | Montenegro | 10–12 | Croatia | Tokyo Tatsumi International Swimming Center; Referees: Viktor Salnichenko (KAZ), György Kun (HUN) |
| 6 August 2021; 14:00 v | Report | Score by quarters: 0–1, 4–5, 3–3, 3–3 | | | Tokyo Tatsumi International Swimming Center; Referees: Viktor Salnichenko (KAZ), György Kun (HUN) |
| 6 August 2021; 14:00 v | Report | Ivović 3 | Goals | Vukičević 3 | Tokyo Tatsumi International Swimming Center; Referees: Viktor Salnichenko (KAZ), György Kun (HUN) |

Seventh place game

| 8 August 2021; 09:30 v | Report | Montenegro | 14–14; PSO: 3–4 | Italy | Tokyo Tatsumi International Swimming Center; Referees: Viktor Salnichenko (KAZ), Sébastien Dervieux (FRA) |
| 8 August 2021; 09:30 v | Report | Score by quarters: 2–3, 5–4, 4–5, 3–2 | | | Tokyo Tatsumi International Swimming Center; Referees: Viktor Salnichenko (KAZ), Sébastien Dervieux (FRA) |
| 8 August 2021; 09:30 v | Report | Ivović 6 | Goals | Velotto 5 | Tokyo Tatsumi International Swimming Center; Referees: Viktor Salnichenko (KAZ), Sébastien Dervieux (FRA) |
