= Water polo at the 2024 Summer Olympics – Men's team rosters =

These are the rosters of all participating teams at the men's water polo tournament at the 2024 Summer Olympics in Paris. The twelve national teams were required to submit squads of 12 players. Additionally, teams could name one reserve player.

== Group A ==
=== Croatia ===
The roster was announced on 7 July 2024.

Head coach: Ivica Tucak

- 1 Marko Bijač (c) GK
- 2 Rino Burić CB
- 3 Loren Fatović W
- 4 Luka Lončar CF
- 5 Maro Joković W
- 6 Luka Bukić D
- 7 Ante Vukičević D
- 8 Marko Žuvela CB
- 9 Jerko Marinić Kragić D
- 10 Josip Vrlić CF
- 11 Matias Biljaka CB
- 12 Konstantin Kharkov W
- 13 Toni Popadić GK

=== Greece ===
The roster was announced on 6 July 2024.

Head coach: Thodoris Vlachos

- 1 Emmanouil Zerdevas GK
- 2 Konstantinos Genidounias D
- 3 Dimitrios Skoumpakis CB
- 4 Efstathios Kalogeropoulos D
- 5 Ioannis Fountoulis (c) D
- 6 Alexandros Papanastasiou D
- 7 Nikos Gillas D
- 8 Stylianos Argyropoulos CB
- 9 Nikolaos Papanikolaou CF
- 10 Konstantinos Kakaris CF
- 11 Dimitris Nikolaidis CF
- 12 Angelos Vlachopoulos D
- 13 Panagiotis Tzortzatos GK

=== Italy ===
The roster was announced on 7 July 2024.

Head coach: Sandro Campagna

- 1 Marco Del Lungo GK
- 2 Francesco Di Fulvio (c) W
- 3 Alessandro Velotto D
- 4 Tommaso Gianazza CF
- 5 Andrea Fondelli D
- 6 Francesco Condemi W
- 7 Vincenzo Renzuto CB
- 8 Gonzalo Echenique W
- 9 Nicholas Presciutti CB
- 10 Lorenzo Bruni CF
- 11 Edoardo Di Somma D
- 12 Matteo Iocchi Gratta CB
- 13 Gianmarco Nicosia GK

=== Montenegro ===
A 18-player roster was announced on 28 June 2024.

Head coach: Vladimir Gojković

- 1 Dejan Lazović GK
- 2 Marko Mršić W
- 3 Miroslav Perković CB
- 4 Jovan Vujović CB
- 5 Aljoša Mačić CB
- 6 Vlado Popadić W
- 7 Stefan Vidović D
- 8 Bogdan Đurđić W
- 9 Đuro Radović W W
- 10 Vladan Spaić CB
- 11 Dušan Matković W
- 12 Vasilije Radović CB
- 13 Petar Tešanović (c) GK

=== Romania ===
The roster was announced on 10 July 2024.

Head coach: Bogdan Rath

- 1 Marius Țic (c) GK
- 2 Francesco Iudean CB
- 3 Matei Luțescu CB
- 4 Tudor Fulea D
- 5 Andrei Neamțu W
- 6 Andrei Prioteasa W
- 7 Andrei Țepeluș CB
- 8 Nicolae Oanță CB
- 9 Silvian Colodrovschi CF
- 10 Vlad Georgescu D
- 11 Sebastian Oltean D
- 12 Levente Vancsik CF
- 13 Mihai Drăgușin GK

=== United States ===
The roster was announced on 18 June 2024.

Head coach: Dejan Udovičić

No.	Player	Pos.	L/R	Height	Weight	Date of birth (age)	Apps	OG/ Goals	Club	Ref
1	Adrian Weinberg	GK	R	1.96 m (6 ft 5 in)	95 kg (209 lb)	25 November 2001 (aged 22)			(United States) Pride WP	
2	Johnny Hooper	AT	R	1.88 m (6 ft 2 in)	88 kg (194 lb)	24 June 1997 (aged 27)			(Italy) Telimar Palermo	
3	Marko Vavic	AT	R	1.98 m (6 ft 6 in)	103 kg (227 lb)	25 April 1999 (aged 25)			(Italy) RN Savona	
4	Alex Obert	CF	R	1.96 m (6 ft 5 in)	105 kg (231 lb)	18 December 1991 (aged 32)			(United States) NYAC	
5	Hannes Daube	AT	R	1.98 m (6 ft 6 in)	106 kg (234 lb)	5 January 2000 (aged 24)			(Croatia) Jug Dubrovnik	
6	Luca Cupido	AT	R	1.91 m (6 ft 3 in)	97 kg (214 lb)	9 November 1995 (aged 28)			(Italy) CC Ortigia	
7	Ben Hallock (c)	CF	R	1.98 m (6 ft 6 in)	115 kg (254 lb)	22 November 1997 (aged 26)			(Italy) Pro Recco	
8	Dylan Woodhead	AT	R	2.01 m (6 ft 7 in)	100 kg (220 lb)	25 September 1998 (aged 25)			(Greece) NC Vouliagmeni	
9	Alex Bowen	AT	R	1.96 m (6 ft 5 in)	106 kg (234 lb)	4 September 1993 (aged 30)			(France) CN Noisy-le-Sec	
10	Chase Dodd	FP	R	1.94 m (6 ft 4 in)	104 kg (229 lb)	5 April 2003 (aged 21)			(United States) Vanguard	
11	Ryder Dodd	FP	R	1.83 m (6 ft 0 in)	93 kg (205 lb)	19 January 2006 (aged 18)			(United States) Mission WPC	
12	Max Irving	AT	R	1.85 m (6 ft 1 in)	81 kg (179 lb)	21 May 1995 (aged 29)			(Italy) AN Brescia	
13	Drew Holland	GK	R	1.96 m (6 ft 5 in)	83 kg (183 lb)	11 April 1995 (aged 29)			(Greece) G.S. Peristeri	

== Group B ==
=== Australia ===
The roster was announced on 28 May 2024.

Head coach: Tim Hamill

- 1 Nic Porter GK
- 2 Angus Lambie CF
- 3 Milos Maksimovic D
- 4 Charlie Negus D
- 5 Nathan Power (c) CB
- 6 Lachlan Edwards CF
- 7 Luke Pavillard W
- 8 Jacob Mercep W
- 9 Matthew Byrnes D
- 10 Marcus Berehulak CB
- 11 Chaz Poot D
- 12 Blake Edwards D
- 13 John Hedges GK

=== France ===
The roster was announced on 8 July 2024.

Head coach: Florian Bruzzo

- 1 Clément Dubois GK
- 2 Rémi Saudadier CF
- 3 Ugo Crousillat (c) D
- 4 Alexandre Bouet W
- 5 Enzo Khasz CB
- 6 Thomas Vernoux CF
- 7 Romain Marion-Vernoux D
- 8 Emil Bjorch CF
- 9 Mehdi Marzouki D
- 10 Michaël Bodegas CF
- 11 Pierre-Frédéric Vanpeperstraete W
- 12 Enzo Nardon W
- 13 Hugo Fontani GK

=== Hungary ===
The roster was announced on 11 July 2024.

Head coach: Zsolt Varga

- 1 Soma Vogel GK
- 2 Dániel Angyal CB
- 3 Krisztián Manhercz W
- 4 Erik Molnár CB
- 5 Márton Vámos W
- 6 Ádám Nagy CB
- 7 Gergő Fekete D
- 8 Gergő Zalánki W
- 9 Vince Vigvári D
- 10 Dénes Varga W
- 11 Szilárd Jansik (c) D
- 12 Balázs Hárai CF
- 13 Márk Bányai GK

=== Japan ===
The roster was announced on 16 July 2024.

Head coach: Shiota Yoshinori

- 1 Katsuyuki Tanamura GK
- 2 Seiya Adachi W
- 3 Taiyo Watanabe D
- 4 Daichi Ogihara D
- 5 Kai Inoue W
- 6 Toi Suzuki (c) W
- 7 Kiyomu Date W
- 8 Mitsuru Takata CB
- 9 Ikkei Nitta D
- 10 Yusuke Inaba W
- 11 Keigo Okawa W
- 12 Kenta Araki CF
- 13 Towa Nishimura GK

=== Serbia ===
A 19-player roster was announced on 24 June 2024. The final roster was announced on 21 July 2024.

Head coach: Uroš Stevanović

- 1 Radoslav Filipović GK
- 2 Dušan Mandić D
- 3 Strahinja Rašović D
- 4 Sava Ranđelović CB
- 5 Miloš Ćuk D
- 6 Nikola Dedović D
- 7 Radomir Drašović CB
- 8 Nikola Jakšić (c) CB
- 9 Nemanja Ubović CF
- 10 Nemanja Vico CF
- 11 Petar Jakšić CB
- 12 Viktor Rašović D
- 13 Vladimir Mišović GK

=== Spain ===
The roster was announced on 8 July 2024.

Head coach: David Martín

- 1 Unai Aguirre GK
- 2 Alberto Munárriz D
- 3 Álvaro Granados D
- 4 Bernat Sanahuja D
- 5 Miguel de Toro CF
- 6 Marc Larumbe D
- 7 Martin Faměra CB
- 8 Sergi Cabanas CB
- 9 Roger Tahull CF
- 10 Felipe Perrone (c) D
- 11 Unai Biel D
- 12 Alejandro Bustos CB
- 13 Eduardo Lorrio GK

== See also ==
- Water polo at the 2024 Summer Olympics – Women's team rosters
