= 2019 LEN Super Cup =

Water polo match

Ferencváros	CN Marseille
(Hungary)	(France)
14	11
- Date: 2 November 2019
- Venue: Piscine Pierre Garsau, Marseille

The 2019 LEN Super Cup was the 38th edition of the annual trophy organised by LEN and contested by the reigning champions of the two European competitions for men's water polo clubs. The match was played between European champions Ferencváros (winners of the 2018–19 LEN Champions League) and CN Marseille (winners of the 2018–19 LEN Euro Cup) at the Piscine Pierre Garsau in Marseille, France, on 2 November 2019.

Ferencváros contested the match for the third consecutive year, the first in this streak as Champions League's title holder. The Hungarian team won its second consecutive Super Cup, the fourth in total, managing to come back from a 4-goal down.

== Teams ==
Team	Qualification	Previous participation (bold indicates winners)
(Hungary) Ferencváros	Winners of the 2018–19 LEN Champions League	**1978**, **1980**, 2017, **2018**
(France) CN Marseille	Winners of the 2018–19 LEN Euro Cup	Debut

=== Squads ===
Ferencváros
No.	Nat.	Player	Birth Date	Position	L/R
1	(Hungary)	András Gárdonyi	February 6, 1986	Goalkeeper	
2	(Hungary)	Tamás Sedlmayer	January 6, 1995	Guard	
3	(Hungary)	Gergő Zalánki	February 26, 1995		
4	(Hungary)	Zoltán Pohl	March 27, 1995	Guard	
5	(Hungary)	Márton Vámos	June 24, 1992	Centre Back / Wing	L
6	(Hungary)	Tamás Mezei	September 14, 1990	Centre Forward	L
7	(Canada)	Nicolas Constantin-Bicari	December 5, 1991	Centre Back	
8	(Serbia)	Nikola Jakšić	January 17, 1997	Guard	R
9	(Australia)	Aaron Younger	September 25, 1991	Guard	R
10	(Hungary)	Dénes Varga (c)	March 29, 1987	Centre Back	R
11	(Hungary)	Szilárd Jansik	April 6, 1994	Guard	
12	(Greece)	Ioannis Fountoulis	May 25, 1988	Centre Forward	
13	(Hungary)	Soma Vogel	July 7, 1997	Goalkeeper	

Head coach: Zsolt Varga

CN Marseille
No.	Nat.	Player	Birth Date	Position	L/R
1	(France)	Arshak Hovannysyan	January 24, 1997	Goalkeeper	
2	(France)	P.F. Vanpeterstraete	May 14, 1992	Centre Back	R
3	(France)	Mathias Olivon	June 29, 1995	All-Round	R
4	(France)	Mishka Izdinsky	July 23, 1992	Driver	L
5	(Montenegro)	Uroš Čučković	April 25, 1990	Centre Back	R
6	(France)	Thomas Vernoux	March 21, 2002	Field Player	R
7	(France)	Ugo Crousillat	October 27, 1990	Wing	L
8	(Montenegro)	Bogdan Đurđić	August 8, 1996	Wing	R
9	(France)	Romain Marion-Vernoux	January 2, 2002	Wing	R
10	(France)	Igor Kovacevic (c)	November 3, 1988	Driver	R
11	(Croatia)	Ante Vukičević	February 24, 1993	Field Player	R
12	(France)	Alexandre Camarasa	June 10, 1987	Centre Forward	R
13	(Montenegro)	Miloš Šćepanović	September 10, 1982	Goalkeeper	

Head coach: Marc Amardeilh

== Match ==
2 November 2019; 20:30 (CET)	Report	(Hungary) Ferencváros	14–11	CN Marseille (France)	Piscine Pierre Garsau, Marseille; Referees: Margeta (SLO), Colombo (ITA)
2 November 2019; 20:30 (CET)	Report	Score by quarters: 2–2, 2–6, 4–1, 6–2			Piscine Pierre Garsau, Marseille; Referees: Margeta (SLO), Colombo (ITA)
2 November 2019; 20:30 (CET)	Report	5: Fountoulis; 3: Younger; 2: Zalánki, Varga; 1: Constantin-Bicari, Jansik	Goals	3: Đurđić; 2: Kovacevic, Vukičević, Camarasa; 1: Crousillat, Marion-Vernoux	Piscine Pierre Garsau, Marseille; Referees: Margeta (SLO), Colombo (ITA)
