= Montenegro at the 2024 Summer Olympics =

- IOC code: MNE
- NOC: Montenegrin Olympic Committee
- Website: www.cok.me(in Montenegrin)

in Paris, France 26 July 2024 – 11 August 2024
- Competitors: 19 (16 men and 3 women) in 6 sports
- Flag bearer: Milivoj Dukić & Danka Kovinić
- Medals: Gold 0 Silver 0 Bronze 0 Total 0

Summer Olympics appearances (overview)
- 2008; 2012; 2016; 2020; 2024

Other related appearances
- Yugoslavia (1920–1992W); Independent Olympic Participants (1992S); Serbia and Montenegro (1996–2006)

Montenegro competed at the 2024 Summer Olympics in Paris from 26 July to 11 August 2024. It was the nation's fifth consecutive appearance at the Summer Olympics since its official debut in 2008.

== Competitors ==
The following is the list of number of competitors in the Games.

Sport	Men	Women	Total
Athletics	1	0	1
Boxing	0	1	1
Sailing	1	0	1
Swimming	1	1	2
Tennis	0	1	1
Water polo	13	0	13
Total	16	3	19

== Athletics ==
Montenegro sent one sprinter to compete at the 2024 Summer Olympics.

Key

- Note–Ranks given for track events are within the athlete's heat only
- Q = Qualified for the next round
- q = Qualified for the next round as a fastest loser or, in field events, by position without achieving the qualifying target
- NR = National record
- N/A = Round not applicable for the event
- Bye = Athlete not required to compete in round

Track events

Athlete	Event	Preliminary		Heat		Repechage		Semifinal		Final	
Athlete	Event	Result	Rank	Result	Rank	Result	Rank	Result	Rank	Result	Rank
Darko Pešić	Men's 100 m	11.85	43	Did not advance		—		Did not advance			

== Boxing ==
Montenegro entered one female boxer into the Olympic tournament. Bojana Gojković (women's bantamweight) secured her spots in her division, through receiving the allocations of universality spots.

Athlete	Event	Round of 32	Round of 16	Quarterfinals	Semifinals	Final	
Athlete	Event	Opposition Result	Opposition Result	Opposition Result	Opposition Result	Opposition Result	Rank
Bojana Gojković	Women's 54 kg	Huang (TPE); L 0–5	Did not advance				

== Sailing ==
Montenegrin sailors qualified one boat in the following classes through the 2024 ILCA World Championships in Adelaide, Australia.

Medal race events

Athlete	Event	Race													Net points	Final rank
Athlete	Event	1	2	3	4	5	6	7	8	9	10	11	12	M*	Net points	Final rank
Milivoj Dukić	Men's Laser	3	23	13	~~33~~	7	32	2	26	Cancelled		—		EL	106	14

M = Medal race; EL = Eliminated – did not advance into the medal race

== Swimming ==
Montenegro has received a Universality invitation from World Aquatics to send two swimmers (one male and one female) to the Olympics.

Athlete	Event	Heat		Semifinal		Final	
Athlete	Event	Time	Rank	Time	Rank	Time	Rank
Miloš Milenković	Men's 100 m butterfly	54.26	34	Did not advance			
Jovana Kuljača	Women's 50 m freestyle	27.19	40	Did not advance			

== Tennis ==
Montenegro entered one tennis player into the games. Rio 2016 Olympian, Danka Kovinić will represent the nations at the games by virtue of the universality spots allocations results; marking the nations comeback to the sports after the last participation at 2016.

Athlete	Event	Round of 64	Round of 32	Round of 16	Quarterfinals	Semifinals	Final / BM	
Athlete	Event	Opposition Score	Opposition Score	Opposition Score	Opposition Score	Opposition Score	Opposition Score	Rank
Danka Kovinić	Women's singles	Sakkari (GRE); L 0–6, 1–6	Did not advance					

== Water polo ==
Summary

Key:
- FT – After full time.
- P – Match decided by penalty-shootout.

Team	Event	Group stage						Quarterfinal	Semifinal	Final / BM	
Team	Event	Opposition Score	Opposition Score	Opposition Score	Opposition Score	Opposition Score	Rank	Opposition Score	Opposition Score	Opposition Score	Rank
Montenegro men's	Men's tournament	Croatia; L 8–11	Greece; L 16–17	Italy; L 9–11	United States; L 7–12	Romania; W 10–7	5	Did not advance			9

=== Men's tournament ===
Montenegro men's national water polo team qualified for the Olympics by advancing to the quarterfinals and securing an outright berth at the 2024 World Aquatics Championships in Doha, Qatar.

Team roster

A 18-player roster was announced on 28 June 2024.

Head coach: Vladimir Gojković

- 1 Dejan Lazović GK
- 2 Marko Mršić W
- 3 Miroslav Perković CB
- 4 Jovan Vujović CB
- 5 Aljoša Mačić CB
- 6 Vlado Popadić W
- 7 Stefan Vidović D
- 8 Bogdan Đurđić W
- 9 Đuro Radović W W
- 10 Vladan Spaić CB
- 11 Dušan Matković W
- 12 Vasilije Radović CB
- 13 Petar Tešanović (c) GK

Group play

Pos	Team	Pld	W	PSW	PSL	L	GF	GA	GD	Pts	Qualification
1	Greece	5	3	1	0	1	61	52	+9	11 (Note: Greece 9–8 Italy)	Quarterfinals
2	Italy	5	3	1	0	1	60	43	+17	11	Quarterfinals
3	United States	5	3	0	0	2	59	51	+8	9 (Note: Croatia 11–14 United States)	Quarterfinals
4	Croatia	5	3	0	0	2	58	57	+1	9	Quarterfinals
5	Montenegro	5	1	0	2	2	45	50	−5	5	
6	Romania	5	0	0	0	5	37	67	−30	0	

Source: Olympics
Rules for classification: 1) Points; 2) Head-to-head points; 3) Head-to-head goal difference; 4) Head-to-head goals scored; 5) Goal difference.
Notes:

28 July 2024; 16:35 v	Report	Croatia	11–8	Montenegro	Paris Aquatic Centre, Paris; Referees: Boris Margeta (SLO), David Gómez (ESP)
28 July 2024; 16:35 v	Report	Score by quarters: 3–1, 2–4, 3–1, 3–2			Paris Aquatic Centre, Paris; Referees: Boris Margeta (SLO), David Gómez (ESP)
28 July 2024; 16:35 v	Report	Fatović 3	Goals	Đurđić 3	Paris Aquatic Centre, Paris; Referees: Boris Margeta (SLO), David Gómez (ESP)

30 July 2024; 19:30 v	Report	Montenegro	16–17 (PSO)	Greece	Paris Aquatic Centre, Paris; Referees: Frank Ohme (GER), Tamás Kovács (HUN)
30 July 2024; 19:30 v	Report	Score by quarters: 4–2, 3–3, 2–3, 3–4 PSO: 4–5			Paris Aquatic Centre, Paris; Referees: Frank Ohme (GER), Tamás Kovács (HUN)
30 July 2024; 19:30 v	Report	Popadić 4	Goals	Vlachopoulos 3	Paris Aquatic Centre, Paris; Referees: Frank Ohme (GER), Tamás Kovács (HUN)

1 August 2024; 16:35 v	Report	Italy	11–9 (PSO)	Montenegro	Paris Aquatic Centre, Paris; Referees: Boris Margeta (SLO), Michiel Zwart (NED)
1 August 2024; 16:35 v	Report	Score by quarters: 2–2, 2–2, 3–3, 1–1 PSO: 3–1			Paris Aquatic Centre, Paris; Referees: Boris Margeta (SLO), Michiel Zwart (NED)
1 August 2024; 16:35 v	Report	Di Fulvio, Echenique 2	Goals	Popadić 3	Paris Aquatic Centre, Paris; Referees: Boris Margeta (SLO), Michiel Zwart (NED)

3 August 2024; 16:35 v	Report	Montenegro	7–12	United States	Paris Aquatic Centre, Paris; Referees: Frank Ohme (GER), Zhang Liang (CHN)
3 August 2024; 16:35 v	Report	Score by quarters: 1–4, 1–3, 4–3, 1–2			Paris Aquatic Centre, Paris; Referees: Frank Ohme (GER), Zhang Liang (CHN)
3 August 2024; 16:35 v	Report	Đurđić 3	Goals	Daube 5	Paris Aquatic Centre, Paris; Referees: Frank Ohme (GER), Zhang Liang (CHN)

5 August 2024; 21:40 v	Report	Romania	7–10	Montenegro	Paris La Défense Arena, Paris; Referees: Boris Margeta (SLO), Yasser Mehalhel (EGY)
5 August 2024; 21:40 v	Report	Score by quarters: 3–3, 1–2, 1–2, 2–3			Paris La Défense Arena, Paris; Referees: Boris Margeta (SLO), Yasser Mehalhel (EGY)
5 August 2024; 21:40 v	Report	Fulea 2	Goals	Mršić 3	Paris La Défense Arena, Paris; Referees: Boris Margeta (SLO), Yasser Mehalhel (EGY)
