= PVK Jadran =

Professional water polo club in Herceg Novi, Montenegro

- Official logo
- Founded: 1922; 104 years ago
- League: Montenegrin First League; VRL Premier League; Champions League
- Based in: Herceg Novi, Montenegro
- President: Đuro Marić
- Website: www.pvkjadran.com

PVK Jadran is a professional water polo club based in Herceg Novi, Montenegro. As of the 2026–27 season, the club competes in the Montenegrin First League, the regional VRL Premier League, and the Champions League.

PVK Jadran is a 16-time winner of the National league (10 Montenegro, 2 SFR Yugoslavia, 4 Serbia & Montenegro), 13-time winner of the National cup (10 Montenegro, 3 SFR Yugoslavia), 2-time winner of the Regional Water Polo League, and 1-time runner-up of the LEN Champions League.

== History ==
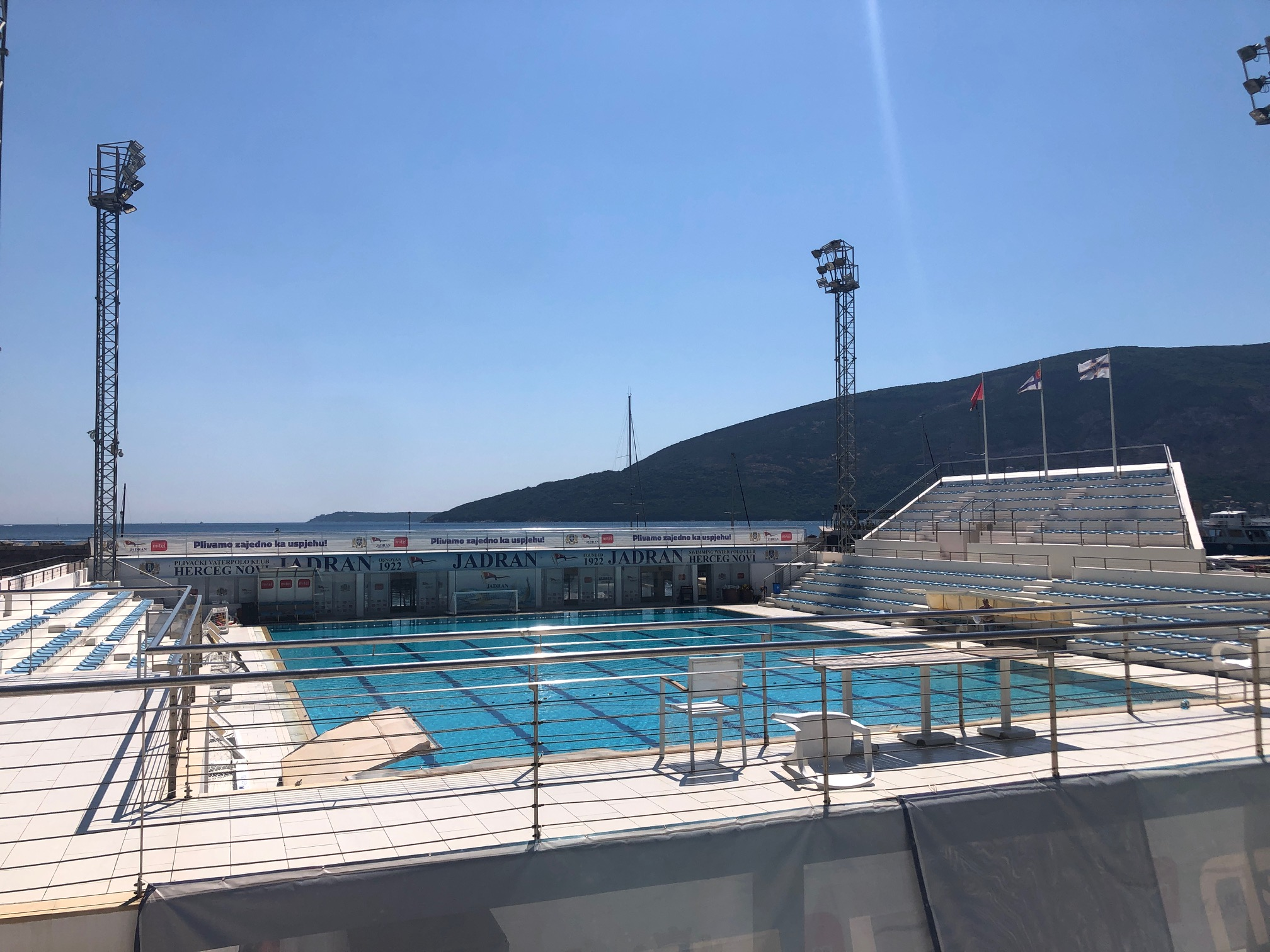
The new water polo stadium of Herceg Novi

PVK Jadran was founded in the summer of 1922 as a merger between two water polo clubs, Bijela Vila and Spjaža. It was then registered with the Swimming Federation of Yugoslavia. It was the only water club in the Bay of Kotor region and played against teams from Dubrovnik. PVK Jadran's first win was when they had beaten VK Građani, the best club in Yugoslavia at the time after VK Jug and VK Jadran.

After World War II in 1945, the national championship was held in Ljubljana and Jadran represented Montenegro, and won fourth place. Jadran also played the final of the Euroleague in 2004 where it was defeated by Honved.

On 19 July 2012, a new stadium was inaugurated, directly in the harbor at the promenade, with a roof for the winter season.

In 2018–19 season, PVK Jadran was a runner-up in 2018–19 LEN Euro Cup, after losing on aggregate with 16–15 to the French team Marseille.

== Notable former players ==
- (Montenegro) Boris Zloković
- (Montenegro) Božidar Stanišić
- (Montenegro) Petar Prlainović
- (Montenegro) Rajko Prlainović
- (Montenegro) Petar Prlainović
- (Montenegro) Aleksandar Ivović
- (Montenegro) Vladimir Gojković
- (Serbia) Andrija Prlainović
- (Montenegro) Nikola Janović
- (Serbia) Vanja Udovičić
- (Montenegro) Aleksandar Radović
- (Montenegro) Miloš Šćepanović
- (Serbia) Denis Šefik
- (Italy) Danijel Premuš
- (Croatia) Marko Jelača
- (Croatia) Marko Elez
- (Montenegro) Nikola Vukčević

== Notable former coaches ==
- (Montenegro) Petar Porobić

== Former squads ==
2007–08 squad

- (Croatia) Višeslav Sarić (Feb 2, 1977)
- (Montenegro) Drago Pejaković (May 28, 1980)
- (Croatia) Marko Elez (Sep 9, 1980)
- (Croatia) Danijel Premuš (Apr 15, 1981)
- (Montenegro) Miloš Šćepanović (Oct 9, 1982) (Goalkeeper)
- (Netherlands) Richard van Eck (Mar 8, 1983)
- (Montenegro) Nikola Vukčević (Nov 14, 1985)
- (Montenegro) Ljubomir Vrbica (Sep 8, 1985)
- (Montenegro) Aleksandar Ivović (Feb 24, 1986)
- (Canada) Kevin Graham (Apr 21, 1986)
- (Montenegro) Novak Jelić (Jan 14, 1986) (Goalkeeper)
- (Montenegro) Luka Sekulić (Jul 1, 1987)
- (Montenegro) Aleksandar Radović (Feb 24, 1987)
- (Montenegro) Filip Klikovac (Feb 7, 1989)

2008–2009 squad

- (Montenegro) Miloš Šćepanović (Goalkeeper)
- (Montenegro) Luka Sekulić
- (Canada) Kevin Graham
- (Croatia) Marko Elez
- (Montenegro) Nikola Vukčević
- (Montenegro) Aleksandar Radović
- (Croatia) Marko Jelača
- (Montenegro) Vladimir Gojković
- (Montenegro) Aleksandar Ivović
- (Montenegro) Drago Pejaković
- (Italy) Danijel Premuš
- (United States) Jesse Smith
- (North Macedonia) Dalibor Perčinić (Goalkeeper)

2009–10 squad

- (Montenegro) Miloš Šćepanović (Goalkeeper)
- (Montenegro) Luka Sekulić
- (Croatia) Ivan Bebić
- (Croatia) Marko Elez
- (Montenegro) Nikola Vukčević
- (Montenegro) Aleksandar Radović
- (Montenegro) Nikola Janović
- (Montenegro) Vladimir Gojković
- (Montenegro) Aleksandar Ivović
- (Montenegro) Boris Zloković
- (Montenegro) Filip Klikovac
- (North Macedonia) Dalibor Perčinić (Goalkeeper)
- (Montenegro) Đorđe Tešanović
- Head Coach : (Croatia) Ivica Tucak
- 2nd Coach : (Montenegro) Vaso Ćuković
- 3rd Coach : (Montenegro) Lazar Vuksanović

2010–2011 squad

- (Montenegro) Miloš Šćepanović (Goalkeeper)
- (Montenegro) Luka Sekulić
- (Montenegro) Damir Crepulja
- (Montenegro) Nikola Janović
- (Serbia) Đorđe Filipović
- (Montenegro) Radovan Latinović
- (Serbia) Uroš Kalinić
- (Montenegro) Vladimir Gojković
- (Italy) Danijel Premuš
- (Montenegro) Gavril Subotić
- (Serbia) Petar Filipović
- (Croatia) Željko Kovačić
- (Montenegro) Đorđe Tešanović
- (Montenegro) Stefan Vidović
- Head Coach : (Croatia) Ivica Tucak
- 2nd Coach : (Montenegro) Vaso Ćuković
- 3rd Coach : (Montenegro) Lazar Vuksanović

2011–12 squad

- (Montenegro) Miloš Šćepanović (Goalkeeper)
- (Montenegro) Luka Sekulić
- (Montenegro) Jovan Sarić
- (Croatia) Ivan Krizman
- (Croatia) Martin Beltrame
- (Montenegro) Radovan Latinović
- (Montenegro) Stefan Vidović
- (Montenegro) Vladimir Gojković
- (Italy) Danijel Premuš
- (Montenegro) Gavril Subotić
- (Montenegro) Nikola Tomašević
- (Montenegro) Bojan Banićević
- (Montenegro) Đorđe Tešanović
- (Montenegro) Petar Vuksanović
- (Montenegro) Slaven Kandić (Goalkeeper)
- Head Coach : (Croatia) Ivica Tucak
- 2nd Coach : (Montenegro) Vaso Ćuković
- 3rd Coach : (Montenegro) Lazar Vuksanović

2012–13 squad

- (Montenegro) Miloš Šćepanović (Goalkeeper)
- (United States) Clayton Snyder
- (Montenegro) Aleksa Brkić
- (Montenegro) Đorđe Tešanović
- (Montenegro) Stefan Vidović
- (Montenegro) Aleksandar Radović
- (Montenegro) Bojan Banićević
- (Montenegro) Jovan Sarić
- (Montenegro) Radovan Latinović
- (Montenegro) Igor Porobić
- (Montenegro) Lazar Pasuljević
- (Montenegro) Nikola Tomašević
- (Croatia) Ivan Krizman
- (Montenegro) Nikola Giga
- (Montenegro) Vlado Popadić
- (Montenegro) Slaven Kandić (Goalkeeper)
- Head Coach : (Montenegro) Vladimir Gojković
- 2nd Coach : (Montenegro) Petar Radanović
- 3rd Coach : (Montenegro) Lazar Vuksanović

2013–14 squad

- (Montenegro) Slaven Kandić (Goalkeeper)
- (Montenegro) Nikola Moskov
- (Montenegro) Vlado Popadić
- (Croatia) Željko Kovačić
- (Montenegro) Stefan Vidović
- (Montenegro) Marko Brajović
- (Montenegro) Bojan Banićević
- (Montenegro) Jovan Sarić
- (Montenegro) Radovan Latinović
- (Montenegro) Luka Sekulić
- (Montenegro) Stefan Pješivac
- (Montenegro) Aleksa Ukropina
- (Montenegro) Nikola Giga
- (Montenegro) Marko Porobić
- (Montenegro) Stefan Porobić
- (Montenegro) Vladan Spaić
- (Montenegro) Miloš Popović (Goalkeeper)
- Head Coach : (Montenegro) Vladimir Gojković
- 2nd Coach : (Montenegro) Petar Radanović
- 3rd Coach : (Montenegro) Lazar Vuksanović

2014–15 squad

- (Montenegro) Slaven Kandić (Goalkeeper)
- (Montenegro) Nikola Moskov
- (Montenegro) Vlado Popadić
- (Georgia (country)) Andria Bitadze
- (Montenegro) Stefan Vidović
- (Montenegro) Bojan Banićević
- (Montenegro) Jovan Sarić
- (Montenegro) Dragan Drašković
- (Montenegro) Radovan Latinović
- (Montenegro) Luka Sekulić
- (Montenegro) Stefan Pješivac
- (Montenegro) Aleksa Ukropina
- (Montenegro) Nikola Giga
- (Montenegro) Stefan Porobić
- (Montenegro) Vladan Spaić
- (Montenegro) Filip Gardašević
- (Montenegro) Nikola Brkić
- (Montenegro) Đuro Radović
- (Montenegro) Petar Mijušković
- (Montenegro) Petar Tešanović (Goalkeeper)
- (Montenegro) Miloš Popović (Goalkeeper)
- Head Coach : (Montenegro) Vladimir Gojković
- 2nd Coach : (Montenegro) Petar Radanović
- 3rd Coach : (Montenegro) Lazar Vuksanović

2015–16 squad

- (Montenegro) Slaven Kandić (Goalkeeper)
- (Serbia) Aleksa Petrovski
- (Montenegro) Vlado Popadić
- (Montenegro) Đuro Radović
- (Montenegro) Stefan Vidović
- (Montenegro) Bojan Banićević
- (Montenegro) Nikola Janović
- (Serbia) Miroslav Ranđić
- (Montenegro) Vladan Spaić
- (Croatia) Željko Kovačić
- (Montenegro) Stefan Pješivac
- (Montenegro) Aleksa Ukropina
- (Montenegro) Nikola Moskov
- (Montenegro) Nikola Brkić
- (Montenegro) Petar Mijušković
- (Montenegro) Filip Gardašević
- (Montenegro) Miloš Popović (Goalkeeper)
- (Montenegro) Dragan Kolesko (Goalkeeper)
- (Montenegro) Petar Tešanović (Goalkeeper)

2016–17 squad

- (Montenegro) Miloš Šćepanović (Goalkeeper)
- (Montenegro) Slaven Kandić (Goalkeeper)
- (Serbia) Marko Petković
- (Montenegro) Vlado Popadić
- (Montenegro) Đuro Radović
- (Montenegro) Stefan Vidović
- (Montenegro) Bojan Banićević
- (Montenegro) Nikola Janović
- (Russia) Danil Merkulov
- (Montenegro) Vladan Spaić
- (Croatia) Željko Kovačić
- (Montenegro) Stefan Pješivac
- (Montenegro) Aleksa Ukropina
- (Montenegro) Nikola Moskov
- (Montenegro) Nikola Brkić
- (Montenegro) Stefan Porobić
- (Montenegro) Petar Mijušković
- (Montenegro) Filip Gardašević
- (Montenegro) Luka Murišić
- (Montenegro) Danilo Radović
- (Montenegro) Martin Gardašević
- (Montenegro) Dragan Kolesko (Goalkeeper)
- (Montenegro) Petar Tešanović (Goalkeeper)
- Head Coach : (Montenegro) Vladimir Gojković
- 2nd Coach : (Montenegro) Petar Radanović
- 3rd Coach : (Montenegro) Lazar Vuksanović

== Recent seasons ==
=== Rankings in Montenegrin First League ===
P.	07	08	09	10	11	12	13	14	15	16	17
1			1	1		1		1	1	1	1
2					2						
3	3	3					3				
4											

=== In European competition ===
Season	Competition	Round	Club	Home	Away	Aggregate
