= 2020–21 LEN Champions League preliminary round =

This article describes the group stage of the 2020–21 LEN Champions League.

The LEN (European Swimming League) Champions League preliminary round began on 12 December 2020 and concluded on 24 April 2021.

== Draw ==
The draw for the group phase took place in Rome on 19 October 2020.

== Format ==
LEN decided to play the 10 match-days of the 2020–21 LEN Champions League preliminary round in bubble format in three rounds, using two venues at each occasion. The ten match-days will be played in three rounds at two venues each time.

Teams of the same group will contest three match-days, one time four, where the participants will be isolated for the entire duration of event because of the COVID-19 pandemic.

== Groups ==
The matchdays were 3 phase. The first phase of matches were played between 14 and 17 December, the second were played between 1–5 March 2021, the third were played between 19 and 22 April 2021. The matches in the Group B were started one day later.

Times were CET/CEST, (Note: CET (UTC+1) for dates up to 27 March 2021 (matchday 1–7), and CEST (UTC+2) for dates thereafter (matchdays 8–10).) as listed by LEN (local times, if different, are in parentheses).

=== Group A ===
Pos	Team	Pld	W	D	L	GF	GA	GD	Pts	Qualification	(Italy) REC	(Croatia) JUG	(Greece) OLY	(France) CNM	(Germany) S04	(Italy) CCO
1	(Italy) Pro Recco	10	10	0	0	127	68	+59	30	Final 8	—	18–3	13–6	11–9	19–6	10–3
2	(Croatia) Jug CO Dubrovnik	10	6	1	3	102	106	−4	19	Final 8	11–12	—	11–11	11–10	12–10	8–6
3	(Greece) Olympiacos	10	4	2	4	89	92	−3	14	Final 8	8–14	8–9	—	11–7	8–8	6–4
4	(France) CN Marseille	10	4	1	5	93	94	−1	13	Final 8	8–10	15–13	9–8	—	8–5	10–11
5	(Germany) Spandau 04	10	1	3	6	79	104	−25	6		7–10	7–13	9–13	7–7	—	12–6
6	(Italy) Ortigia Siracusa	10	1	1	8	69	95	−26	4		7–10	9–11	8–10	7–10	8–8	—

Source: LEN

14 December 2020; 15:15	Report	Olympiacos (Greece)	6–4	(Italy) Ortigia Siracusa	Rome; Referees: Margeta (SLO), Putniković (SRB)
14 December 2020; 15:15	Report	Score by quarters: 1–2, 2–0, 2–1, 1–1			Rome; Referees: Margeta (SLO), Putniković (SRB)
14 December 2020; 15:15	Report	six players 1	Goals	four players 1	Rome; Referees: Margeta (SLO), Putniković (SRB)

14 December 2020; 17:45	Report	Spandau 04 (Germany)	7–13	(Croatia) Jug CO Dubrovnik	Rome; Referees: Kun (HUN), Zwart (NED)
14 December 2020; 17:45	Report	Score by quarters: 1–4, 2–5, 2-2, 2–2			Rome; Referees: Kun (HUN), Zwart (NED)
14 December 2020; 17:45	Report	Kholod 3	Goals	Lončar, Merkulov 3	Rome; Referees: Kun (HUN), Zwart (NED)

14 December 2020; 20:15	Report	Pro Recco (Italy)	11–9	(France) CN Marseille	Rome; Referees: Berishvili (GEO), Ortega (ESP)
14 December 2020; 20:15	Report	Score by quarters: 2–3, 2–3, 4–2, 3–1			Rome; Referees: Berishvili (GEO), Ortega (ESP)
14 December 2020; 20:15	Report	Di Fulvio, Mandić 3	Goals	Prlainović, Camarasa 2	Rome; Referees: Berishvili (GEO), Ortega (ESP)

15 December 2020; 15:15	Report	Jug CO Dubrovnik (Croatia)	11–10	(France) CN Marseille	Rome; Referees: Ortega (ESP), Petronilli (ITA)
15 December 2020; 15:15	Report	Score by quarters: 4–1, 4–2, 1–3, 2–4			Rome; Referees: Ortega (ESP), Petronilli (ITA)
15 December 2020; 15:15	Report	Fatović 3	Goals	Crousillat 3	Rome; Referees: Ortega (ESP), Petronilli (ITA)

15 December 2020; 17:45	Report	Spandau 04 (Germany)	9–13	(Greece) Olympiacos	Rome; Referees: Berishvili (GEO), Margeta (SLO)
15 December 2020; 17:45	Report	Score by quarters: 3–3, 1–5, 2-2, 3–3			Rome; Referees: Berishvili (GEO), Margeta (SLO)
15 December 2020; 17:45	Report	Kholod 4	Goals	Argyropoulos 3	Rome; Referees: Berishvili (GEO), Margeta (SLO)

15 December 2020; 20:15	Report	Ortigia Siracusa (Italy)	7–10	(Italy) Pro Recco	Rome; Referees: Kun (HUN), Zwart (NED)
15 December 2020; 20:15	Report	Score by quarters: 2–2, 1–2, 4–2, 0–2			Rome; Referees: Kun (HUN), Zwart (NED)
15 December 2020; 20:15	Report	Giacoppo 3	Goals	Mandić 3	Rome; Referees: Kun (HUN), Zwart (NED)

16 December 2020; 15:15	Report	CN Marseille (France)	10–11	(Italy) Ortigia Siracusa	Rome; Referees: Margeta (SLO), Ortega (ESP)
16 December 2020; 15:15	Report	Score by quarters: 1–3, 3–2, 4–3, 2–3			Rome; Referees: Margeta (SLO), Ortega (ESP)
16 December 2020; 15:15	Report	three players 2	Goals	Gallo, Napolitano 3	Rome; Referees: Margeta (SLO), Ortega (ESP)

16 December 2020; 17:45	Report	Olympiacos (Greece)	8–9	(Croatia) Jug CO Dubrovnik	Rome; Referees: Berishvili (GEO), Petronilli (ITA)
16 December 2020; 17:45	Report	Score by quarters: 1–0, 4–2, 0-3, 3–4			Rome; Referees: Berishvili (GEO), Petronilli (ITA)
16 December 2020; 17:45	Report	Kapotsis 3	Goals	Obradović 4	Rome; Referees: Berishvili (GEO), Petronilli (ITA)

16 December 2020; 20:15	Report	Pro Recco (Italy)	19–6	(Germany) Spandau 04	Rome; Referees: Putniković (SRB), Zwart (NED)
16 December 2020; 20:15	Report	Score by quarters: 4–0, 5–3, 5–0, 5–3			Rome; Referees: Putniković (SRB), Zwart (NED)
16 December 2020; 20:15	Report	Younger 4	Goals	Kholod 3	Rome; Referees: Putniković (SRB), Zwart (NED)

1 March 2021; 15:15	Report	Spandau 04 (Germany)	7–7	(France) CN Marseille	Rome; Referees: Margeta (SLO), Severo (ITA)
1 March 2021; 15:15	Report	Score by quarters: 3–1, 2–2, 1–2, 1–2			Rome; Referees: Margeta (SLO), Severo (ITA)
1 March 2021; 15:15	Report	Kholod 3	Goals	seven players 1	Rome; Referees: Margeta (SLO), Severo (ITA)

1 March 2021; 17:45	Report	Jug CO Dubrovnik (Croatia)	8–6	(Italy) Ortigia Siracusa	Rome; Referees: Voevodin (RUS), Koryzna (POL)
1 March 2021; 17:45	Report	Score by quarters: 3–1, 2–1, 2-4, 1–0			Rome; Referees: Voevodin (RUS), Koryzna (POL)
1 March 2021; 17:45	Report	Fatović 2	Goals	six players 1	Rome; Referees: Voevodin (RUS), Koryzna (POL)

1 March 2021; 20:15	Report	Olympiacos (Greece)	8–14	(Italy) Pro Recco	Rome; Referees: Periš (CRO), Putniković (SRB)
1 March 2021; 20:15	Report	Score by quarters: 0–1, 3–4, 3–5, 2–4			Rome; Referees: Periš (CRO), Putniković (SRB)
1 March 2021; 20:15	Report	Daube, Argyropoulos 3	Goals	Velotto, Luongo 3	Rome; Referees: Periš (CRO), Putniković (SRB)

2 March 2021; 15:15	Report	Spandau 04 (Germany)	12–6	(Italy) Ortigia Siracusa	Rome; Referees: Periš (CRO), Putniković (SRB)
2 March 2021; 15:15	Report	Score by quarters: 4–2, 4–1, 2–3, 2–0			Rome; Referees: Periš (CRO), Putniković (SRB)
2 March 2021; 15:15	Report	four players 2	Goals	Giacoppo, Gallo 2	Rome; Referees: Periš (CRO), Putniković (SRB)

2 March 2021; 17:45	Report	CN Marseille (France)	9–8	(Greece) Olympiacos	Rome; Referees: Koryzna (POL), Severo (ITA)
2 March 2021; 17:45	Report	Score by quarters: 0–0, 4–3, 3–4, 2–1			Rome; Referees: Koryzna (POL), Severo (ITA)
2 March 2021; 17:45	Report	Spaić, Vukičević 2	Goals	Irving 3	Rome; Referees: Koryzna (POL), Severo (ITA)

2 March 2021; 20:15	Report	Pro Recco (Italy)	18–3	(Croatia) Jug CO Dubrovnik	Rome; Referees: Margeta (SLO), Teixido (ESP)
2 March 2021; 20:15	Report	Score by quarters: 4–0, 4–1, 6–0, 4–2			Rome; Referees: Margeta (SLO), Teixido (ESP)
2 March 2021; 20:15	Report	Figlioli 3	Goals	Fatović 2	Rome; Referees: Margeta (SLO), Teixido (ESP)

3 March 2021; 15:15	Report	CN Marseille (France)	8–10	(Italy) Pro Recco	Rome; Referees: Periš (CRO), Voevodin (RUS)
3 March 2021; 15:15	Report	Score by quarters: 2–4, 1–3, 2–2, 3–1			Rome; Referees: Periš (CRO), Voevodin (RUS)
3 March 2021; 15:15	Report	Crousillat 4	Goals	four players 2	Rome; Referees: Periš (CRO), Voevodin (RUS)

3 March 2021; 17:45	Report	Jug CO Dubrovnik (Croatia)	12–10	(Germany) Spandau 04	Rome; Referees: Putniković (SRB), Severo (ITA)
3 March 2021; 17:45	Report	Score by quarters: 3–3, 3–2, 3-2, 3–3			Rome; Referees: Putniković (SRB), Severo (ITA)
3 March 2021; 17:45	Report	Fatović, Papanastasiou 4	Goals	Kholod 3	Rome; Referees: Putniković (SRB), Severo (ITA)

3 March 2021; 20:15	Report	Ortigia Siracusa (Italy)	8–10	(Greece) Olympiacos	Rome; Referees: Teixido (ESP), Margeta (SLO)
3 March 2021; 20:15	Report	Score by quarters: 2–3, 2–2, 2–3, 2–2			Rome; Referees: Teixido (ESP), Margeta (SLO)
3 March 2021; 20:15	Report	Ferrero, Gallo 2	Goals	three players 2	Rome; Referees: Teixido (ESP), Margeta (SLO)

4 March 2021; 15:15	Report	CN Marseille (France)	15–13	(Croatia) Jug CO Dubrovnik	Rome; Referees: Teixido (ESP), Putniković (SRB)
4 March 2021; 15:15	Report	Score by quarters: 5–3, 4–4, 2–3, 4–3			Rome; Referees: Teixido (ESP), Putniković (SRB)
4 March 2021; 15:15	Report	three players 3	Goals	Fatović 3	Rome; Referees: Teixido (ESP), Putniković (SRB)

4 March 2021; 17:45	Report	Olympiacos (Greece)	8–8	(Germany) Spandau 04	Rome; Referees: Margeta (SLO), Periš (CRO)
4 March 2021; 17:45	Report	Score by quarters: 3–2, 0–3, 4–2, 1–1			Rome; Referees: Margeta (SLO), Periš (CRO)
4 March 2021; 17:45	Report	Argyropoulos 3	Goals	Dedović 4	Rome; Referees: Margeta (SLO), Periš (CRO)

4 March 2021; 20:15	Report	Pro Recco (Italy)	10–3	(Italy) Ortigia Siracusa	Rome; Referees: Voevodin (RUS), Koryzna (POL)
4 March 2021; 20:15	Report	Score by quarters: 2–0, 3–0, 3–3, 2–0			Rome; Referees: Voevodin (RUS), Koryzna (POL)
4 March 2021; 20:15	Report	Di Fulvio 3	Goals	three players 1	Rome; Referees: Voevodin (RUS), Koryzna (POL)

19 April 2021; 15:15	Report	Spandau 04 (Germany)	7–10	(Italy) Pro Recco	Rome; Referees: Mišković (MNE), Franulović (CRO)
19 April 2021; 15:15	Report	Score by quarters: 2–2, 2–4, 2–1, 1–3			Rome; Referees: Mišković (MNE), Franulović (CRO)
19 April 2021; 15:15	Report	Chiru, Dedović 2	Goals	Figari, Mandić 2	Rome; Referees: Mišković (MNE), Franulović (CRO)

19 April 2021; 17:45	Report	Jug CO Dubrovnik (Croatia)	11–11	(Greece) Olympiacos	Rome; Referees: Buch (ESP), Zwart (NED)
19 April 2021; 17:45	Report	Score by quarters: 4–3, 0–3, 4–4, 3–1			Rome; Referees: Buch (ESP), Zwart (NED)
19 April 2021; 17:45	Report	Merkulov 4	Goals	Genidounias 5	Rome; Referees: Buch (ESP), Zwart (NED)

19 April 2021; 20:15	Report	Ortigia Siracusa (Italy)	7–10	(France) CN Marseille	Rome; Referees: Stavridis (GRE), Koryzna (POL)
19 April 2021; 20:15	Report	Score by quarters: 0–3, 4–2, 1–3, 2–2			Rome; Referees: Stavridis (GRE), Koryzna (POL)
19 April 2021; 20:15	Report	Napolitano 2	Goals	three players 2	Rome; Referees: Stavridis (GRE), Koryzna (POL)

20 April 2021; 15:15	Report	Ortigia Siracusa (Italy)	9–11	(Croatia) Jug CO Dubrovnik	Rome; Referees: Marjay (HUN), Mišković (MNE)
20 April 2021; 15:15	Report	Score by quarters: 4–5, 2–4, 2–1, 1–1			Rome; Referees: Marjay (HUN), Mišković (MNE)
20 April 2021; 15:15	Report	three players 2	Goals	Benić 3	Rome; Referees: Marjay (HUN), Mišković (MNE)

20 April 2021; 17:45	Report	CN Marseille (France)	8–5	(Germany) Spandau 04	Rome; Referees: Franulović (CRO), Zwart (NED)
20 April 2021; 17:45	Report	Score by quarters: 2–1, 1–1, 3–1, 2–2			Rome; Referees: Franulović (CRO), Zwart (NED)
20 April 2021; 17:45	Report	Marion-Vernoux, Vukičević 2	Goals	Kholod 2	Rome; Referees: Franulović (CRO), Zwart (NED)

20 April 2021; 20:15	Report	Pro Recco (Italy)	13–6	(Greece) Olympiacos	Rome; Referees: Koryzna (POL), Buch (ESP)
20 April 2021; 20:15	Report	Score by quarters: 2–1, 5–3, 5–0, 1–2			Rome; Referees: Koryzna (POL), Buch (ESP)
20 April 2021; 20:15	Report	Di Fulvio 5	Goals	Argyropoulos, Daube 2	Rome; Referees: Koryzna (POL), Buch (ESP)

21 April 2021; 15:15	Report	Ortigia Siracusa (Italy)	8–8	(Germany) Spandau 04	Rome; Referees: Zwart (NED), Buch (ESP)
21 April 2021; 15:15	Report	Score by quarters: 1–3, 3–1, 4–3, 0–1			Rome; Referees: Zwart (NED), Buch (ESP)
21 April 2021; 15:15	Report	Napolitano 3	Goals	Kholod 4	Rome; Referees: Zwart (NED), Buch (ESP)

21 April 2021; 17:45	Report	Olympiacos (Greece)	11–7	(France) CN Marseille	Rome; Referees: Franulović (CRO), Mišković (MNE)
21 April 2021; 17:45	Report	Score by quarters: 2–2, 3–2, 3–1, 3–2			Rome; Referees: Franulović (CRO), Mišković (MNE)
21 April 2021; 17:45	Report	Genidounias, Mourikis 3	Goals	Crousillat 4	Rome; Referees: Franulović (CRO), Mišković (MNE)

21 April 2021; 20:15	Report	Jug CO Dubrovnik (Croatia)	11–12	(Italy) Pro Recco	Rome; Referees: Stavridis (GRE), Marjay (HUN)
21 April 2021; 20:15	Report	Score by quarters: 3–3, 2–4, 3–1, 3–4			Rome; Referees: Stavridis (GRE), Marjay (HUN)
21 April 2021; 20:15	Report	Merkulov 4	Goals	Figlioli 3	Rome; Referees: Stavridis (GRE), Marjay (HUN)

=== Group B ===
Pos	Team	Pld	W	D	L	GF	GA	GD	Pts	Qualification	(Hungary) FTC	(Spain) BAR	(Italy) BRE	(Germany) HAN	(Georgia (country)) DTB	(Montenegro) JHN
1	(Hungary) FTC Telekom	10	8	0	2	113	73	+40	24	Final 8	—	11–10	7–10	13–9	15–11	12–5
2	(Spain) Zodiac CNA Barceloneta	10	8	0	2	119	81	+38	24	Final 8	7–8	—	10–9	12–8	17–5	13–11
3	(Italy) AN Brescia	10	7	0	3	117	80	+37	21	Final 8	9–6	6–8	—	19–11	14–6	6–7
4	(Germany) Waspo 98 Hannover	10	3	0	7	89	122	−33	9	Final 8	6–19	8–16	10–18	—	10–3	9–4
5	(Georgia (country)) Dinamo Tbilisi	10	2	0	8	74	121	−47	6		4–11	6–14	9–15	6–7	—	11–8
6	(Montenegro) Jadran Herceg Novi	10	2	0	8	74	109	−35	6		2–11	9–12	6–11	12–11	10–13	—

Source: LEN

15 December 2020; 14:00	Report	Dinamo Tbilisi (Georgia (country))	9–15	(Italy) AN Brescia	Danube Arena, Budapest; Referees: Scwartz (ISR), Achladiotis (GRE)
15 December 2020; 14:00	Report	Score by quarters: 4–2, 1–4, 1–6, 3–3			Danube Arena, Budapest; Referees: Scwartz (ISR), Achladiotis (GRE)
15 December 2020; 14:00	Report	Jelaca 3	Goals	Vlachopoulos 5	Danube Arena, Budapest; Referees: Scwartz (ISR), Achladiotis (GRE)

15 December 2020; 16:30	Report	Jadran Herceg Novi (Montenegro)	2–11	(Hungary) FTC Telekom	Danube Arena, Budapest; Referees: Voevodin (RUS), Schapers (NED)
15 December 2020; 16:30	Report	Score by quarters: 0–2, 0–3, 1-4, 1–2			Danube Arena, Budapest; Referees: Voevodin (RUS), Schapers (NED)
15 December 2020; 16:30	Report	Vućurović, Averka 1	Goals	Constantin-Bicari 3	Danube Arena, Budapest; Referees: Voevodin (RUS), Schapers (NED)

15 December 2020; 19:00	Report	Waspo 98 Hannover (Germany)	8–16	(Spain) Zodiac CNA Barceloneta	Danube Arena, Budapest; Referees: Tiozzo (CRO), Koryzna (POL)
15 December 2020; 19:00	Report	Score by quarters: 3–3, 2–5, 1–4, 2–4			Danube Arena, Budapest; Referees: Tiozzo (CRO), Koryzna (POL)
15 December 2020; 19:00	Report	three players 2	Goals	Munarriz 6	Danube Arena, Budapest; Referees: Tiozzo (CRO), Koryzna (POL)

16 December 2020; 14:00	Report	Zodiac CNA Barceloneta (Spain)	17–5	(Georgia (country)) Dinamo Tbilisi	Danube Arena, Budapest; Referees: Koryzna (POL), Marjay (HUN)
16 December 2020; 14:00	Report	Score by quarters: 5–0, 4–2, 5–3, 3–0			Danube Arena, Budapest; Referees: Koryzna (POL), Marjay (HUN)
16 December 2020; 14:00	Report	Granados 5	Goals	Jelaca 2	Danube Arena, Budapest; Referees: Koryzna (POL), Marjay (HUN)

16 December 2020; 16:30	Report	FTC Telekom (Hungary)	7–10	(Italy) AN Brescia	Danube Arena, Budapest; Referees: Achladiotis (GRE), Tiozzo (CRO)
16 December 2020; 16:30	Report	Score by quarters: 1–3, 1–2, 4-4, 1–1			Danube Arena, Budapest; Referees: Achladiotis (GRE), Tiozzo (CRO)
16 December 2020; 16:30	Report	Fountoulis 2	Goals	Cannella 3	Danube Arena, Budapest; Referees: Achladiotis (GRE), Tiozzo (CRO)

16 December 2020; 19:00	Report	Jadran Herceg Novi (Montenegro)	12–11	(Germany) Waspo 98 Hannover	Danube Arena, Budapest; Referees: Scwartz (ISR), Voevodin (RUS)
16 December 2020; 19:00	Report	Score by quarters: 3–1, 3–4, 3–5, 3–1			Danube Arena, Budapest; Referees: Scwartz (ISR), Voevodin (RUS)
16 December 2020; 19:00	Report	Averka 5	Goals	Radović, Nagaev 4	Danube Arena, Budapest; Referees: Scwartz (ISR), Voevodin (RUS)

17 December 2020; 14:00	Report	Dinamo Tbilisi (Georgia (country))	11–8	(Montenegro) Jadran Herceg Novi	Danube Arena, Budapest; Referees: Marjay (HUN), Schapers (NED)
17 December 2020; 14:00	Report	Score by quarters: 2–1, 2–3, 3–0, 4–4			Danube Arena, Budapest; Referees: Marjay (HUN), Schapers (NED)
17 December 2020; 14:00	Report	Bitadze, Jelaca 3	Goals	Radović 3	Danube Arena, Budapest; Referees: Marjay (HUN), Schapers (NED)

17 December 2020; 16:30	Report	Waspo 98 Hannover (Germany)	6–19	(Hungary) FTC Telekom	Danube Arena, Budapest; Referees: Achladiotis (GRE), Koryzna (POL)
17 December 2020; 16:30	Report	Score by quarters: 0–2, 0–3, 1-4, 1–2			Danube Arena, Budapest; Referees: Achladiotis (GRE), Koryzna (POL)
17 December 2020; 16:30	Report	Kubisch 2	Goals	Vígvári 4	Danube Arena, Budapest; Referees: Achladiotis (GRE), Koryzna (POL)

17 December 2020; 19:00	Report	AN Brescia (Italy)	6–8	(Spain) Zodiac CNA Barceloneta	Danube Arena, Budapest; Referees: Voevodin (RUS), Scwartz (ISR)
17 December 2020; 19:00	Report	Score by quarters: 2–1, 1–3, 0–2, 3–2			Danube Arena, Budapest; Referees: Voevodin (RUS), Scwartz (ISR)
17 December 2020; 19:00	Report	Cannella, Vlachopoulos 2	Goals	Munarriz 4	Danube Arena, Budapest; Referees: Voevodin (RUS), Scwartz (ISR)

2 March 2021; 14:00	Report	FTC Telekom (Hungary)	11–10	(Spain) Zodiac CNA Barceloneta	Danube Arena, Budapest; Referees: Dervieux (FRA), Zwart (NED)
2 March 2021; 14:00	Report	Score by quarters: 2–3, 3–3, 4–3, 2–1			Danube Arena, Budapest; Referees: Dervieux (FRA), Zwart (NED)
2 March 2021; 14:00	Report	Zalánki, Fountoulis 3	Goals	Granados, Perrone 3	Danube Arena, Budapest; Referees: Dervieux (FRA), Zwart (NED)

2 March 2021; 16:30	Report	Waspo 98 Hannover (Germany)	10–3	(Georgia (country)) Dinamo Tbilisi	Danube Arena, Budapest; Referees: Alexandrescu (ROU), Colombo (ITA)
2 March 2021; 16:30	Report	Score by quarters: 2–0, 2–0, 3-1, 3–3			Danube Arena, Budapest; Referees: Alexandrescu (ROU), Colombo (ITA)
2 March 2021; 16:30	Report	Radović 3	Goals	three players 1	Danube Arena, Budapest; Referees: Alexandrescu (ROU), Colombo (ITA)

2 March 2021; 19:00	Report	Jadran Herceg Novi (Montenegro)	6–11	(Germany) AN Brescia	Danube Arena, Budapest; Referees: Stavridis (GRE), Gomez (RUS)
2 March 2021; 19:00	Report	Score by quarters: 1–4, 2–1, 0–2, 3–4			Danube Arena, Budapest; Referees: Stavridis (GRE), Gomez (RUS)
2 March 2021; 19:00	Report	Radović, Averka 2	Goals	Joković 3	Danube Arena, Budapest; Referees: Stavridis (GRE), Gomez (RUS)

3 March 2021; 14:00	Report	AN Brescia (Italy)	19–11	(Germany) Waspo 98 Hannover	Danube Arena, Budapest; Referees: Stavridis (GRE), Dervieux (FRA)
3 March 2021; 14:00	Report	Score by quarters: 2–1, 6–5, 5–3, 6–3			Danube Arena, Budapest; Referees: Stavridis (GRE), Dervieux (FRA)
3 March 2021; 14:00	Report	three players 3	Goals	Nagaev 4	Danube Arena, Budapest; Referees: Stavridis (GRE), Dervieux (FRA)

3 March 2021; 16:30	Report	Dinamo Tbilisi (Georgia (country))	4–11	(Hungary) FTC Telekom	Danube Arena, Budapest; Referees: Alexandrescu (ROU), Gomez (ESP)
3 March 2021; 16:30	Report	Score by quarters: 0–5, 1–3, 2-1, 1–2			Danube Arena, Budapest; Referees: Alexandrescu (ROU), Gomez (ESP)
3 March 2021; 16:30	Report	Vapenski 2	Goals	four players 2	Danube Arena, Budapest; Referees: Alexandrescu (ROU), Gomez (ESP)

3 March 2021; 19:00	Report	Jadran Herceg Novi (Montenegro)	9–12	(Spain) Zodiac CNA Barceloneta	Danube Arena, Budapest; Referees: Kun (HUN), Zwart (NED)
3 March 2021; 19:00	Report	Score by quarters: 2–2, 2–2, 2–3, 3–5			Danube Arena, Budapest; Referees: Kun (HUN), Zwart (NED)
3 March 2021; 19:00	Report	Averka 4	Goals	Granados 4	Danube Arena, Budapest; Referees: Kun (HUN), Zwart (NED)

4 March 2021; 14:00	Report	AN Brescia (Italy)	14–6	(Georgia (country)) Dinamo Tbilisi	Danube Arena, Budapest; Referees: Kun (HUN), Dervieux (FRA)
4 March 2021; 14:00	Report	Score by quarters: 4–1, 5–3, 2–0, 3–2			Danube Arena, Budapest; Referees: Kun (HUN), Dervieux (FRA)
4 March 2021; 14:00	Report	Joković 3	Goals	Jelaca 2	Danube Arena, Budapest; Referees: Kun (HUN), Dervieux (FRA)

4 March 2021; 16:30	Report	Zodiac CNA Barceloneta (Spain)	12–8	(Germany) Waspo 98 Hannover	Danube Arena, Budapest; Referees: Alexandrescu (ROU), Colombo (ITA)
4 March 2021; 16:30	Report	Score by quarters: 3–1, 4–3, 2-3, 3–1			Danube Arena, Budapest; Referees: Alexandrescu (ROU), Colombo (ITA)
4 March 2021; 16:30	Report	Munarriz 3	Goals	three players 2	Danube Arena, Budapest; Referees: Alexandrescu (ROU), Colombo (ITA)

4 March 2021; 19:00	Report	FTC Telekom (Hungary)	12–5	(Montenegro) Jadran Herceg Novi	Danube Arena, Budapest; Referees: Stavridis (GRE), Zwart (NED)
4 March 2021; 19:00	Report	Score by quarters: 4–1, 2–2, 3–1, 3–1			Danube Arena, Budapest; Referees: Stavridis (GRE), Zwart (NED)
4 March 2021; 19:00	Report	Vígvári 4	Goals	Radović 2	Danube Arena, Budapest; Referees: Stavridis (GRE), Zwart (NED)

5 March 2021; 14:00	Report	Dinamo Tbilisi (Georgia (country))	6–14	(Spain) Zodiac CNA Barceloneta	Danube Arena, Budapest; Referees: Colombo (ITA), Dervieux (FRA)
5 March 2021; 14:00	Report	Score by quarters: 0–3, 0–4, 3–4, 3–3			Danube Arena, Budapest; Referees: Colombo (ITA), Dervieux (FRA)
5 March 2021; 14:00	Report	Vapenski 2	Goals	Bodegas, Aleksić 4	Danube Arena, Budapest; Referees: Colombo (ITA), Dervieux (FRA)

5 March 2021; 16:30	Report	AN Brescia (Italy)	9–6	(Hungary) FTC Telekom	Danube Arena, Budapest; Referees: Alexandrescu (ROU), Stavridis (GRE)
5 March 2021; 16:30	Report	Score by quarters: 3–3, 3–0, 1–2, 2–1			Danube Arena, Budapest; Referees: Alexandrescu (ROU), Stavridis (GRE)
5 March 2021; 16:30	Report	three players 2	Goals	three players 2	Danube Arena, Budapest; Referees: Alexandrescu (ROU), Stavridis (GRE)

5 March 2021; 19:00	Report	Waspo 98 Hannover (Germany)	9–4	(Montenegro) Jadran Herceg Novi	Danube Arena, Budapest; Referees: Kun (HUN), Gomez (ESP)
5 March 2021; 19:00	Report	Score by quarters: 1–1, 3–1, 3–1, 2–1			Danube Arena, Budapest; Referees: Kun (HUN), Gomez (ESP)
5 March 2021; 19:00	Report	Radović 3	Goals	Averka 2	Danube Arena, Budapest; Referees: Kun (HUN), Gomez (ESP)

20 April 2021; 14:00	Report	FTC Telekom (Hungary)	13–9	(Germany) Waspo 98 Hannover	Danube Arena, Budapest; Referees: Putniković (SRB), Voevodin (RUS)
20 April 2021; 14:00	Report	Score by quarters: 4–3, 2–1, 3–4, 4–1			Danube Arena, Budapest; Referees: Putniković (SRB), Voevodin (RUS)
20 April 2021; 14:00	Report	Varga 6	Goals	Ćorušić, Nagaev 2	Danube Arena, Budapest; Referees: Putniković (SRB), Voevodin (RUS)

20 April 2021; 16:30	Report	Jadran Herceg Novi (Montenegro)	10–13	(Georgia (country)) Dinamo Tbilisi	Danube Arena, Budapest; Referees: Colombo (ITA), Peris (CRO)
20 April 2021; 16:30	Report	Score by quarters: 3–4, 1–2, 2–4, 4–3			Danube Arena, Budapest; Referees: Colombo (ITA), Peris (CRO)
20 April 2021; 16:30	Report	Averka 4	Goals	six players 2	Danube Arena, Budapest; Referees: Colombo (ITA), Peris (CRO)

20 April 2021; 19:00	Report	Zodiac CNA Barceloneta (Spain)	10–9	(Italy) AN Brescia	Danube Arena, Budapest; Referees: Margeta (SLO), Dervieux (FRA)
20 April 2021; 19:00	Report	Score by quarters: 2–3, 2–4, 5–2, 1–0			Danube Arena, Budapest; Referees: Margeta (SLO), Dervieux (FRA)
20 April 2021; 19:00	Report	Mallarach 3	Goals	Cannella 3	Danube Arena, Budapest; Referees: Margeta (SLO), Dervieux (FRA)

21 April 2021; 14:00	Report	Dinamo Tbilisi (Georgia (country))	6–7	(Germany) Waspo 98 Hannover	Danube Arena, Budapest; Referees: Margeta (SLO), Kun (HUN)
21 April 2021; 14:00	Report	Score by quarters: 1–1, 2–2, 3–1, 0–3			Danube Arena, Budapest; Referees: Margeta (SLO), Kun (HUN)
21 April 2021; 14:00	Report	Sarić 3	Goals	Muslim 4	Danube Arena, Budapest; Referees: Margeta (SLO), Kun (HUN)

21 April 2021; 16:30	Report	AN Brescia (Italy)	6–7	(Montenegro) Jadran Herceg Novi	Danube Arena, Budapest; Referees: Dervieux (FRA), Voevodin (RUS)
21 April 2021; 16:30	Report	Score by quarters: 2–2, 0–0, 1–3, 3–2			Danube Arena, Budapest; Referees: Dervieux (FRA), Voevodin (RUS)
21 April 2021; 16:30	Report	six players 1	Goals	Radović 2	Danube Arena, Budapest; Referees: Dervieux (FRA), Voevodin (RUS)

21 April 2021; 19:00	Report	Zodiac CNA Barceloneta (Spain)	7–8	(Hungary) FTC Telekom	Danube Arena, Budapest; Referees: Peris (CRO), Putniković (SRB)
21 April 2021; 19:00	Report	Score by quarters: 1–2, 1–2, 2–3, 3–1			Danube Arena, Budapest; Referees: Peris (CRO), Putniković (SRB)
21 April 2021; 19:00	Report	Bodegas 3	Goals	Fountoulis 4	Danube Arena, Budapest; Referees: Peris (CRO), Putniković (SRB)

22 April 2021; 14:00	Report	Zodiac CNA Barceloneta (Spain)	13–11	(Montenegro) Jadran Herceg Novi	Danube Arena, Budapest; Referees: Margeta (SLO), Putniković (SRB)
22 April 2021; 14:00	Report	Score by quarters: 5–2, 3–3, 3–3, 2–3			Danube Arena, Budapest; Referees: Margeta (SLO), Putniković (SRB)
22 April 2021; 14:00	Report	Granados 5	Goals	Averka 4	Danube Arena, Budapest; Referees: Margeta (SLO), Putniković (SRB)

22 April 2021; 16:30	Report	FTC Telekom (Hungary)	15–11	(Georgia (country)) Dinamo Tbilisi	Danube Arena, Budapest; Referees: Dervieux (FRA), Colombo (ITA)
22 April 2021; 16:30	Report	Score by quarters: 5–3, 4–2, 2–2, 4–4			Danube Arena, Budapest; Referees: Dervieux (FRA), Colombo (ITA)
22 April 2021; 16:30	Report	Vámos, Vigvári 3	Goals	four players 2	Danube Arena, Budapest; Referees: Dervieux (FRA), Colombo (ITA)

22 April 2021; 19:00	Report	Waspo 98 Hannover (Germany)	10–18	(Italy) AN Brescia	Danube Arena, Budapest; Referees: Peris (CRO), Kun (HUN)
22 April 2021; 19:00	Report	Score by quarters: 3–5, 2–3, 2–6, 3–4			Danube Arena, Budapest; Referees: Peris (CRO), Kun (HUN)
22 April 2021; 19:00	Report	Schuetze 4	Goals	Vlachopoulos 4	Danube Arena, Budapest; Referees: Peris (CRO), Kun (HUN)
