= Nikola Brkić =

Montenegrin water polo player

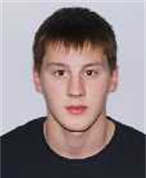
- Brkić 2015

Personal information
- Nationality: Montenegro
- Born: 1 September 1998 (age 27) Kotor, Montenegro
- Height: 1.93 m (6 ft 4 in)
- Weight: 93 kg (205 lb)

Sport
- Sport: Water polo
- Position: Back, Driver
- Club: PVK Jadran 2014-2021 ANO Glyfada 2021-2022 Miskolci VLC 2022-2023 VK Primorac Kotor 2023-
Medal record
LEN Euro Cup
Silver medal – second place	2019 PVK Jadran

Nikola Brkić (born 1 September 1998) is a professional water polo player of Montenegro. Brkić started his career at PVK Jadran.

== Clubs ==
Brkić played for PVK Jadran until 2021. He won the 3 National Cups and 3 National Championships with PVK Jadran. In the season 2018/19 was finalist in LEN Euro Cup.

In 2021 he transferred to ANO Glyfada.

In 2022 he transferred to Miskolci VLC where he played during the 2022/23 club season

In season 2023/2024 he came back to Montenegrin League, this time VPK Primorac Kotor. 2024 - where he won Montenegrin Championship in the same season.

== Senior career ==
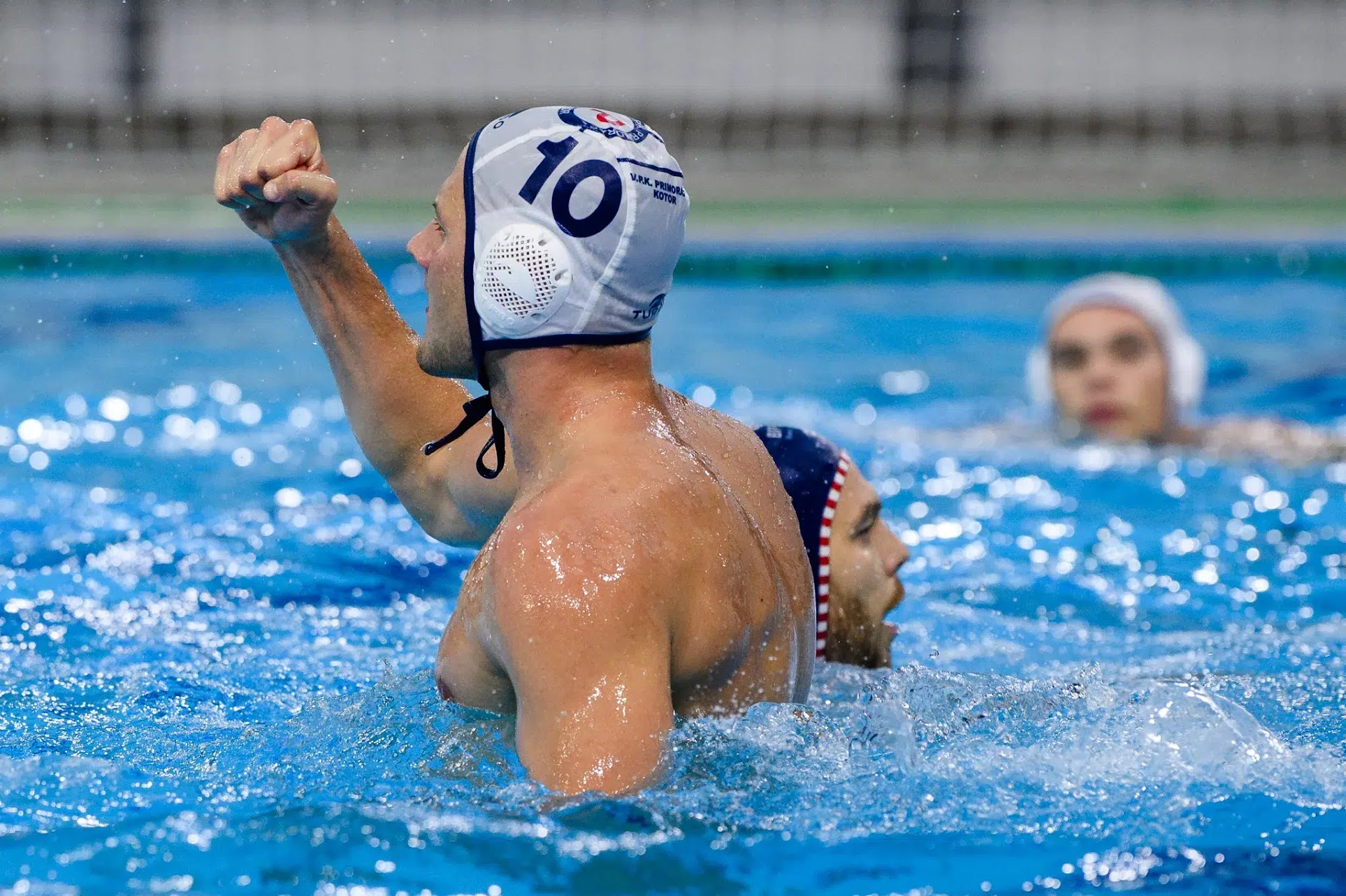
VK Primorac - RN Savona match

PVK Jadran 2014 - 2021

ANO Glyfada 2021 - 2022

Miskolci VLC 2022 - 2023

VK Primorac Kotor 2024 -

== Trophies with clubs ==
PVK Jadran:

Montenegrin First League of Water Polo - 1st place: 2014/15, 2018/19, 2020/21

Montenegrin Water Polo Cup - 1st place: 2018/19, 2019/20, 2020/21

LEN Euro Cup - 2nd place: 2018/19

VK Primorac Kotor:

Montenegrin First League of Water Polo - 1st place: 2023/24

Montenegrin Water Polo Cup - 1st place: 2024/25

== Junior team success ==
With junior team of PVK Jadran, he won tournaments such as Montenegrin first league and Montenengrin cup, Adriatic tournament Olympics hope, Adriatic tournament Final 10. With junior national team of Montenegro, he won gold medal on tournament "4 nations" in Bečej, gold medal on tournament in Szentes, silver medal on tournament "Darko Čukić" in Belgrade, and was part of the Montenegrin team at the 2015 European Games in Baku.
