= Igor Kovacevic =

French water polo player (born 1988)

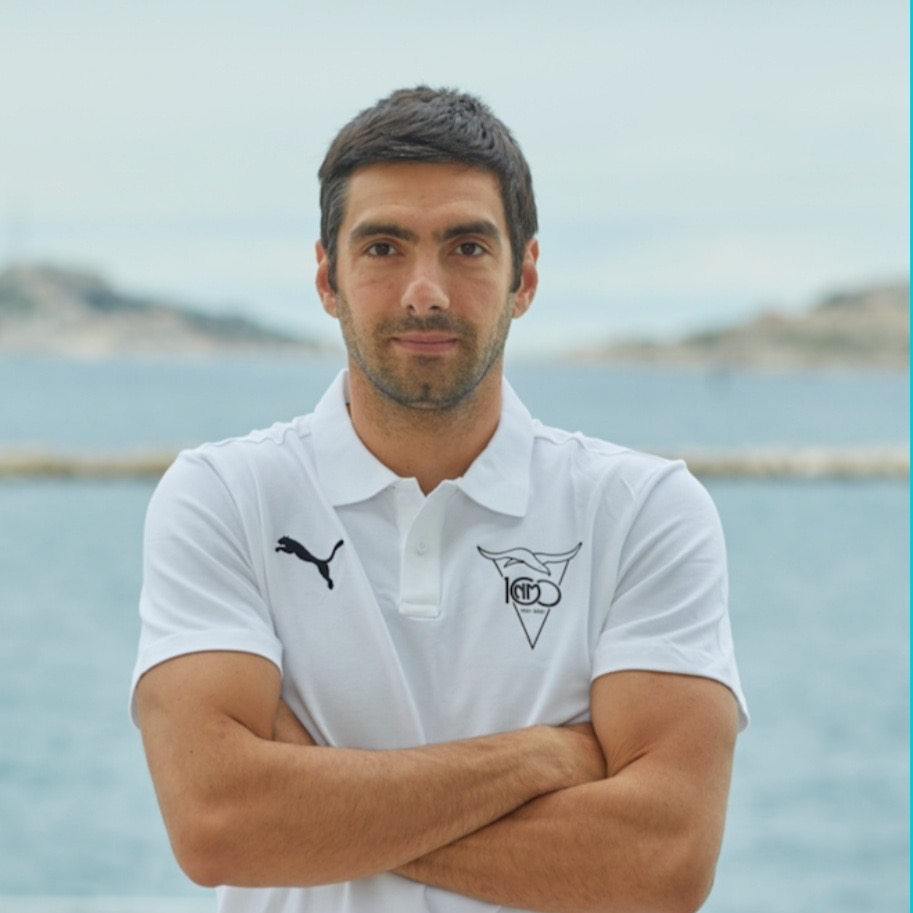
- 2022

Personal information
- Born: 3 November 1988 (age 37) Novi Sad, Serbia
- Height: 190 cm (6 ft 3 in)
- Weight: 88 kg (194 lb)

Sport
- Country: France
- Sport: Water polo
- Club: CN Marseille

Igor Kovacevic (born 3 November 1988) is a water polo player from France. He was part of the French team at the 2016 Summer Olympics, where the team was eliminated in the group stage.
