= Lachlan Edwards =

Lachlan Edwards may refer to:

- Lac Edwards, Australian player of American football
- Lachlan Edwards (water polo), Australian water polo player
