= 2018–19 LEN Champions League =

Water polo sports season

- League: LEN Champions League
- Sport: Water Polo
- Number of teams: 16 (preliminary round)
- Season MVP: (Serbia) Filip Filipović (Pro Recco)
- Top scorer: (Greece) Konstantinos Genidounias 42 goals (Olympiacos)

Final eight
- Champions: (Hungary) FTC Telekom Budapest (1st title)
- Runners-up: (Greece) Olympiacos
- Finals MVP: (Hungary) Denes Varga (Ferencváros)

Champions League seasons
- ← 2017–18 2019–20 →

The 2018–19 LEN Champions League was the 56th edition of LEN's premier competition for men's water polo clubs.

== Overview ==
=== Team allocation ===
12 teams are directly qualified for the preliminary round (TH: Champions League title holders).

Preliminary Round
(Croatia) HAVK Mladost	(Germany) Waspo 98 Hannover	(Italy) Pro Recco	(Russia) Dynamo Moscow
(Croatia) Jug Dubrovnik	(Hungary) ZF Eger	(Greece) Olympiacos ^{TH}	(Serbia) Crvena zvezda
(Germany) Spandau 04	(Hungary) Szolnoki Dozsa	(Romania) Steaua București BA	(Spain) CNA Barceloneta
Qualification round II
(Croatia) Jadran Split	(Greece) NC Vouliagmeni	(Romania) CSM Digi Oradea	(Germany) OSC Potsdam
(Hungary) FTC Telekom Budapest	(Italy) AN Brescia	(Russia) Sintez Kazan	(Spain) CN Sabadell
Qualification round I
(France) Pays D’Aix Natation	(Italy) BPM Sport Management	(Turkey) Enka SK	(Malta) Valletta
(France) Strasbourg	(Romania) Corona Sportul Studențesc	(Netherlands) AZC Alphen	(Georgia (country)) WP Club Tbilisi
(Montenegro) Jadran Carine	(Spain) CN Terrassa	(Ukraine) Dynamo Lviv	

=== Phases and rounds dates ===
The schedule of the competition is as follows.

Phase	Round	First leg	Second leg
Qualifying rounds	Qualification round I	13–16 September 2018	
Qualifying rounds	Qualification round II	28–30 September 2018	
Qualifying rounds	Qualification round III	6 October 2018	10 October 2018
Preliminary round	Matchday 1	17 October 2018	
Preliminary round	Matchday 2	3 November 2018	
Preliminary round	Matchday 3	21 November 2018	
Preliminary round	Matchday 4	5 December 2018	
Preliminary round	Matchday 5	19 December 2018	
Preliminary round	Matchday 6	9 January 2019	
Preliminary round	Matchday 7	23 January 2019	
Preliminary round	Matchday 8	6 February 2019	
Preliminary round	Matchday 9	27 February 2019	
Preliminary round	Matchday 10	16 March 2019	
Preliminary round	Matchday 11	27 March 2019	
Preliminary round	Matchday 12	13 April 2019	
Preliminary round	Matchday 13	24 April 2019	
Preliminary round	Matchday 14	15 May 2019	
Final Eight	Quarterfinals	6 June 2019	
Final Eight	Semifinals	7 June 2019	
Final Eight	Final	8 June 2019	

== Qualifying rounds ==
=== Qualification round I ===
==== Group A ====
Pos	Team	Pld	W	D	L	GF	GA	GD	Pts	Qualification	(Italy) BPM	(France) AIX	(Romania) BRA	(Turkey) ENK	(Ukraine) LVI	(Georgia (country)) TBI
1	(Italy) BPM Sport Management	5	5	0	0	72	28	+44	15	Round II	—	13–8		12–2	22–8	14–3
2	(France) Pays D’Aix Natation	5	4	0	1	61	38	+23	12	Round II		—			15–9	
3	(Romania) Corona Sportul Studențesc (H)	5	3	0	2	45	40	+5	9	Round II	7–11	7–12	—	10–6	9–4	12–7
4	(Turkey) Enka SK	5	2	0	3	32	48	−16	6	Round II		5–11		—	9–8	10–7
5	(Ukraine) Dynamo Lviv	5	1	0	4	39	61	−22	3						—	
6	(Georgia (country)) WP Club Tbilisi	5	0	0	5	27	61	−34	0			4–15			6–10	—

Source: LEN
(H) Hosts

==== Group B ====
Pos	Team	Pld	W	D	L	GF	GA	GD	Pts	Qualification	(Montenegro) JAD	(France) STR	(Spain) TER	(Netherlands) ALP	(Malta) VAL
1	(Montenegro) Jadran Carine	4	4	0	0	63	24	+39	12	Round II	—		10–8		
2	(France) Strasbourg (H)	4	3	0	1	43	30	+13	9	Round II	5–11	—	10–8	12–6	16–5
3	(Spain) CN Terrassa	4	2	0	2	47	32	+15	6	Round II			—	12–9	
4	(Netherlands) AZC Alphen	4	1	0	3	30	47	−17	3	Round II	6–17			—	9–6
5	(Malta) Valletta	4	0	0	4	19	69	−50	0		5–25		3–19		—

Source: LEN
(H) Hosts

=== Qualification round II ===
==== Group C ====
Pos	Team	Pld	W	D	L	GF	GA	GD	Pts	Qualification	(Montenegro) JAD	(Greece) VOU	(Russia) SIN	(Romania) BRA
1	(Montenegro) Jadran Carine (H)	3	3	0	0	41	18	+23	9	Round III	—	8–7	18–6	15–5
2	(Greece) NC Vouliagmeni	3	2	0	1	26	19	+7	6	Round III		—		9–3
3	(Russia) Sintez Kazan	3	1	0	2	27	36	−9	3			8–10	—	
4	(Romania) Corona Sportul Studențesc	3	0	0	3	16	37	−21	0				8–13	—

Source: LEN
(H) Hosts

==== Group D ====
Pos	Team	Pld	W	D	L	GF	GA	GD	Pts	Qualification	(Italy) VER	(Spain) TER	(Spain) SAB	(Germany) POT
1	(Italy) BPM Sport Management	3	2	1	0	42	28	+14	7	Round III	—	13–13		17–11
2	(Spain) CN Terrassa	3	1	2	0	36	26	+10	5	Round III		—		
3	(Spain) CN Sabadell (H)	3	1	1	1	29	27	+2	4		4–12	7–7	—	18–8
4	(Germany) OSC Potsdam	3	0	0	3	25	51	−26	0			6–16		—

Source: LEN
(H) Hosts

==== Group E ====
Pos	Team	Pld	W	D	L	GF	GA	GD	Pts	Qualification	(Italy) BRE	(France) STR	(Romania) ORA	(Turkey) ENK
1	(Italy) AN Brescia	3	3	0	0	43	16	+27	9	Round III	—			12–3
2	(France) Strasbourg	3	2	0	1	24	26	−2	6	Round III	5–16	—		
3	(Romania) CSM Digi Oradea (H)	3	0	1	2	21	31	−10	1		8–15	6–9	—	7–7
4	(Turkey) Enka SK	3	0	1	2	14	29	−15	1			4–10		—

Source: LEN
(H) Hosts

==== Group F ====
Pos	Team	Pld	W	D	L	GF	GA	GD	Pts	Qualification	(Hungary) FTC	(Croatia) SPL	(France) AIX	(Netherlands) ALP
1	(Hungary) FTC Telekom Budapest	3	3	0	0	41	18	+23	9	Round III	—	17–7		14–7
2	(Croatia) Jadran Split	3	2	0	1	37	35	+2	6	Round III		—		
3	(France) Pays D’Aix Natation (H)	3	1	0	2	32	29	+3	3		4–10	11–12	—	17–7
4	(Netherlands) AZC Alphen	3	0	0	3	21	49	−28	0			7–18		—

Source: LEN
(H) Hosts

=== Qualification round III ===
Team 1	Agg.	Team 2	1st leg	2nd leg
FTC Telekom Budapest (Hungary)	22–11	(Greece) NC Vouliagmeni	10–4	12–7
Jadran Split (Croatia)	17–15	(Montenegro) Jadran Carine	11–9	6–6
AN Brescia (Italy)	16–13	(Spain) CN Terrassa	8–4	8–9
Strasbourg (France)	10–26	(Italy) BPM Sport Management	4–10	6–16

== Preliminary round ==
Location of teams of the 2018–19 LEN Champions League group stage.
Red: Group A; Blue: Group B.

The draw for the group stage was held on 5 September 2018 in Barcelona. The 16 teams were drawn into two groups of eight.

In each group, teams play against each other home-and-away in a round-robin format. The group winners, runners-ups and third placed teams advance to the Final 8. They are joined by the host of the tournament and the fourth placed team from a group other than one the host plays in. The matchdays are 17 October, 3 and 21 November, 5 and 19 December 2018, 9 and 23 January, 6 and 27 February, 16 and 27 March, 13 and 24 April, 15 May 2019.

A total of 9 national associations are represented in the group stage.

Key to colors
Advance to the Final Eight	Home team win	Draw	Away team win

=== Group A ===
Pos	Team	Pld	W	D	L	GF	GA	GD	Pts	Qualification	(Italy) PRO	(Spain) BAR	(Italy) BRE	(Hungary) FTC	(Russia) MOS	(Hungary) EGR	(Romania) BUC	(Serbia) CRV
1	(Italy) Pro Recco	14	14	0	0	197	91	+106	42	Final 8	—	8–3	12–6	9–6	11–6	17–7	19–7	21–6
2	(Spain) CNA Barceloneta	14	10	1	3	154	120	+34	31	Final 8	11–15	—	8–8	8–5	13–9	12–7	11–8	14–3
3	(Italy) AN Brescia	14	9	2	3	133	107	+26	29	Final 8	8–9	14–8	—	10–5	10–8	11–6	13–9	7–2
4	(Hungary) FTC Telekom Budapest	14	8	1	5	146	117	+29	25	Final 8	7–13	8–9	8–8	—	13–6	16–9	12–4	17–9
5	(Russia) Dynamo Moscow	14	6	0	8	153	145	+8	18		5–14	12–13	10–6	11–13	—	15–13	16–4	14–4
6	(Hungary) ZF Eger	14	5	0	9	144	179	−35	15		7–16	10–16	8–11	9–12	12–10	—	13–9	17–11
7	(Romania) Steaua București BA	14	2	0	12	109	168	−59	6		8–16	10–14	5–8	6–9	11–14	11–13	—	8–3
8	(Serbia) Crvena zvezda	14	0	0	14	87	196	−109	0		4–17	3–14	9–13	6–15	8–17	12–13	7–9	—

Source: LEN

=== Group B ===
Pos	Team	Pld	W	D	L	GF	GA	GD	Pts	Qualification	(Croatia) JUG	(Greece) OLY	(Italy) VER	(Hungary) SZO	(Croatia) SPL	(Germany) HAN	(Croatia) ZAG	(Germany) SPA
1	(Croatia) Jug Dubrovnik	14	10	2	2	152	110	+42	32	Final 8	—	10–6	9–8	8–7	6–7	18–7	14–11	14–9
2	(Greece) Olympiacos	14	9	3	2	149	98	+51	30	Final 8	10–10	—	11–5	11–10	13–7	17–7	13–8	11–4
3	(Italy) BPM Sport Management	14	8	3	3	125	115	+10	27	Final 8	11–11	7–6	—	7–5	9–8	12–7	12–9	8–6
4	(Hungary) Szolnoki Dozsa	14	6	4	4	135	122	+13	22		10–7	9–9	6–6	—	10–9	10–10	11–8	14–6
5	(Croatia) Jadran Split	14	6	0	8	137	140	−3	18		6–13	3–8	12–9	15–10	—	15–10	10–12	14–8
6	(Germany) Waspo 98 Hannover (Note: Hannover qualified for the Final Eight as the host team of the tournament.)	14	3	3	8	130	169	−39	12	Final 8	7–14	9–9	10–11	9–13	9–8	—	14–9	11–7
7	(Croatia) HAVK Mladost Zagreb	14	3	2	9	129	161	−32	11		5–11	6–14	7–7	8–11	11–12	11–11	—	9–7
8	(Germany) Spandau 04	14	2	1	11	114	156	−42	7		6–7	3–11	8–13	9–9	12–11	15–9	14–15	—

Source: LEN

== Final eight ==
6–8 June 2018—Hannover, Germany

Location of the 2018–19 LEN Champions League Final 8

=== Qualified teams ===
Group	Winners	Runners-up	Third	Fourth	Host
A	(Italy) Pro Recco	(Spain) CNA Barceloneta	(Italy) AN Brescia	(Hungary) FTC Telekom Budapest	
B	(Croatia) Jug Dubrovnik	(Greece) Olympiacos	(Italy) BPM Sport Management		(Germany) Waspo 98 Hannover

=== Bracket ===
Quarterfinals
6 June
(Italy) Pro Recco	14
(Germany) Waspo 98 Hannover	10
6 June
(Greece) Olympiacos	8
(Italy) AN Brescia	7
6 June
(Croatia) Jug Dubrovnik	9
(Hungary) FTC Telekom	10
6 June
(Spain) CNA Barceloneta	12
(Italy) BPM Sport Management	7

Semifinals
7 June
(Italy) Pro Recco	11
(Greece) Olympiacos	12
7 June
(Hungary) FTC Telekom	9
(Spain) CNA Barceloneta	7

Final
8 June
(Greece) Olympiacos	10 (3)
(Hungary) FTC Telekom	10 (4)
Third place game
8 June
(Italy) Pro Recco	8
(Spain) CNA Barceloneta	7

5th–8th place bracket

5th–8th place semifinals
7 June
(Germany) Waspo 98 Hannover	8
(Italy) AN Brescia	11
7 June
(Croatia) Jug Dubrovnik	11
(Italy) BPM Sport Management	8

Fifth place game
8 June
(Italy) AN Brescia	12
(Croatia) Jug Dubrovnik	13
Seventh place game
8 June
(Germany) Waspo 98 Hannover	8
(Italy) BPM Sport Management	10

=== Quarterfinals ===
6 June 2019; 16:00	Report	Jug Dubrovnik (Croatia)	9–10	(Hungary) FTC Telekom Budapest	Hannover; Referees: (Romania) Adrian Alexandrescu (Russia) Sergey Naumov
6 June 2019; 16:00	Report	Score by quarters: 3–5, 2–3, 1–2, 3–0			Hannover; Referees: (Romania) Adrian Alexandrescu (Russia) Sergey Naumov
6 June 2019; 16:00	Report	Fatović 4	Goals	three players 2	Hannover; Referees: (Romania) Adrian Alexandrescu (Russia) Sergey Naumov

6 June 2019; 17:30	Report	CNA Barceloneta (Spain)	12–7	(Italy) BPM Sport Management	Hannover; Referees: (Georgia (country)) Levan Berishvili (France) Sebastien Dervieux
6 June 2019; 17:30	Report	Score by quarters: 2–1, 4–1, 3-3, 3–2			Hannover; Referees: (Georgia (country)) Levan Berishvili (France) Sebastien Dervieux
6 June 2019; 17:30	Report	Granados, Perrone 3	Goals	Mirarchi 4	Hannover; Referees: (Georgia (country)) Levan Berishvili (France) Sebastien Dervieux

6 June 2019; 19:00	Report	Pro Recco (Italy)	14–10	(Germany) Waspo 98 Hannover	Hannover; Referees: (Montenegro) Stanko Ivanovski (Netherlands) Michiel Zwart
6 June 2019; 19:00	Report	Score by quarters: 2–2, 4–3, 4–2, 4–3			Hannover; Referees: (Montenegro) Stanko Ivanovski (Netherlands) Michiel Zwart
6 June 2019; 19:00	Report	Mandić 3	Goals	Radović 4	Hannover; Referees: (Montenegro) Stanko Ivanovski (Netherlands) Michiel Zwart

6 June 2019; 20:30	Report	Olympiacos (Greece)	8–7	(Italy) AN Brescia	Hannover; Referees: (Slovenia) Boris Margeta (Serbia) Ivan Raković
6 June 2019; 20:30	Report	Score by quarters: 2–1, 4–2, 0–1, 2–3			Hannover; Referees: (Slovenia) Boris Margeta (Serbia) Ivan Raković
6 June 2019; 20:30	Report	Mourikis 2	Goals	Presciutti 3	Hannover; Referees: (Slovenia) Boris Margeta (Serbia) Ivan Raković

=== 5th–8th place semifinals ===
7 June 2019; 15:00	Report	Waspo 98 Hannover (Germany)	8–11	(Italy) AN Brescia	Hannover; Referees: (France) Sebastian Dervieux (Montenegro) Stanko Ivanovski
7 June 2019; 15:00	Report	Score by quarters: 1–1, 1–2, 3-3, 3–5			Hannover; Referees: (France) Sebastian Dervieux (Montenegro) Stanko Ivanovski
7 June 2019; 15:00	Report	Brguljan 4	Goals	Rizzo, Muslim 3	Hannover; Referees: (France) Sebastian Dervieux (Montenegro) Stanko Ivanovski

7 June 2019; 16:30	Report	Jug Dubrovnik (Croatia)	11–8	(Italy) BPM Sport Management	Hannover; Referees: (Georgia (country)) Levan Berishvili (Netherlands) Michiel Zwart
7 June 2019; 16:30	Report	Score by quarters: 0–1, 5–3, 1–1, 5–3			Hannover; Referees: (Georgia (country)) Levan Berishvili (Netherlands) Michiel Zwart
7 June 2019; 16:30	Report	Fatović, Benić 4	Goals	Alesiani 3	Hannover; Referees: (Georgia (country)) Levan Berishvili (Netherlands) Michiel Zwart

=== Semifinals ===
7 June 2019; 19:00	SF3	Pro Recco (Italy)	11–12	(Greece) Olympiacos	Hannover; Referees: (Slovenia) Boris Margeta (Russia) Sergey Naumov
7 June 2019; 19:00	SF3	Score by quarters: 3–5, 3–3, 2–3, 3–1			Hannover; Referees: (Slovenia) Boris Margeta (Russia) Sergey Naumov
7 June 2019; 19:00	SF3	Ivović 3	Goals	Fountoulis 3	Hannover; Referees: (Slovenia) Boris Margeta (Russia) Sergey Naumov

7 June 2019; 20:30	SF4	FTC Telekom Budapest (Hungary)	9–7	(Spain) CNA Barceloneta	Hannover; Referees: (Romania) Adrian Alexandrescu (Serbia) Ivan Raković
7 June 2019; 20:30	SF4	Score by quarters: 2-2, 1-1, 2–3, 4–1			Hannover; Referees: (Romania) Adrian Alexandrescu (Serbia) Ivan Raković
7 June 2019; 20:30	SF4	Varga 3	Goals	Granados 3	Hannover; Referees: (Romania) Adrian Alexandrescu (Serbia) Ivan Raković

=== Seventh place game ===
8 June 2019; 15:00	Waspo 98 Hannover (Germany)	8–10	(Italy) BPM Sport Management	Hannover; Referees: (Montenegro) Stanko Ivanovski (Netherlands) Michiel Zwart
8 June 2019; 15:00	Score by quarters: 2–1, 1–5, 2-2, 3–2			Hannover; Referees: (Montenegro) Stanko Ivanovski (Netherlands) Michiel Zwart
8 June 2019; 15:00	Brguljan 3	Goals	Fondelli 4	Hannover; Referees: (Montenegro) Stanko Ivanovski (Netherlands) Michiel Zwart

=== Fifth place game ===
8 June 2019; 16:00	AN Brescia (Italy)	12–13	(Croatia) Jug Dubrovnik	Hannover; Referees: (Georgia (country)) Levan Berishvili (Russia) Sergey Naumov
8 June 2019; 16:00	Score by quarters: 3–4, 4-4, 2-2, 3-3			Hannover; Referees: (Georgia (country)) Levan Berishvili (Russia) Sergey Naumov
8 June 2019; 16:00	Gallo 4	Goals	Fatović 5	Hannover; Referees: (Georgia (country)) Levan Berishvili (Russia) Sergey Naumov

=== Third place game ===
8 June 2019; 19:00	Report	Pro Recco (Italy)	8–7	(Spain) CNA Barceloneta	Hannover; Referees: (Serbia) Ivan Raković (France) Sebastian Dervieux
8 June 2019; 19:00	Report	Score by quarters: 3-3, 2–3, 1-1, 2–0			Hannover; Referees: (Serbia) Ivan Raković (France) Sebastian Dervieux
8 June 2019; 19:00	Report	Filipović 3	Goals	Munarriz 5	Hannover; Referees: (Serbia) Ivan Raković (France) Sebastian Dervieux

=== Final ===
8 June 2019; 20:30	Report	Olympiacos (Greece)	13–14	(Hungary) FTC Telekom Budapest	Hannover; Referees: (Slovenia) Boris Margeta (Romania) Adrian Alexandrescu
8 June 2019; 20:30	Report	Score by quarters: 1–3, 4–5, 2-2, 3–0 PSO: 3–4			Hannover; Referees: (Slovenia) Boris Margeta (Romania) Adrian Alexandrescu
8 June 2019; 20:30	Report	Genidounias 5	Goals	Mitrović 3	Hannover; Referees: (Slovenia) Boris Margeta (Romania) Adrian Alexandrescu

2018–19 LEN Champions League
Champions

FTC Telekom Budapest
1st title

Andras Gardonyi, Tamás Sedlmayer, Mark Kallay, Zoltan Pohl, Márton Vámos, Tamás Mezei, Slobodan Nikić, Nikola Jakšić, Aaron Younger, Dénes Varga, Szilárd Jansik, Soma Vogel, Stefan Mitrović, Norbert Madaras
Head coach
Zsolt Varga

=== Final standings ===
	Team
	(Hungary) FTC Telekom Budapest
Silver medal	(Greece) Olympiacos
Bronze medal	(Italy) Pro Recco
4	(Spain) CNA Barceloneta
5	(Italy) AN Brescia
6	(Croatia) Jug Dubrovnik
7	(Italy) BPM Sport Management
8	(Germany) Waspo 98 Hannover

=== Awards ===
Season MVP	Top Scorer	Player of the Final Eight	Goalkeeper of the Final Eight
(Serbia) Filip Filipović (Pro Recco)	(Greece) Konstantinos Genidounias (Olympiacos) 42 goals	(Hungary) Denes Varga (Ferencváros)	(Hungary) Soma Vogel (Ferencváros)

Total 7 of the Season
LW	(Hungary) Dénes Varga (Ferecvaros)	CF	(Croatia) Josip Vrlić (Barceloneta)	RW	(Hungary) Márton Vámos (Ferecvaros)
LD	(Greece) Konstantinos Genidounias (Olympiacos)	CB	(Croatia) Andro Bušlje (Olympiacos)	RD	(Serbia) Filip Filipović (Pro Recco)
GK	(Hungary) Soma Vogel (Ferecvaros)				

== See also ==
- 2018–19 LEN Euro Cup
