= 2018–19 LEN Euro Cup =

2018−19 LEN Euro Cup
- League: LEN Euro Cup
- Sport: Water Polo
- Duration: 28 September 2018 to 13 April 2019
- Teams: 19
- Finals champions: (France) CN Marseille (1st title)
- Runners-up: (Montenegro) PVK Jadran

Euro Cup seasons
- ← 2017–18 2019−20 →

The 2018–19 LEN Euro Cup was the second tier of European competition in water polo. It ran from 28 September 2018 to 13 April 2019.

== Overview ==
=== Team allocation ===
Qualification round I
(Serbia) VK Partizan	(Germany) SG Neukölln Berlin	(Italy) CC Ortigia	(Greece) NC Ydraikos
(Serbia) VK Nais	(Germany) ASC Duisburg	(Italy) RN Savona	(Montenegro) Primorac Kotor
(France) CN Marseille	(Hungary) BVSC-Zuglo	(Croatia) VK Primorje	(Spain) CN Barcelona
(France) Olympic Nice	(Hungary) OSC Budapest	(Croatia) VK Mornar	
Quarter-finals
(France) Strasbourg (CL Q3)	(Greece) NC Vouliagmeni (CL Q3)	(Montenegro) Jadran Carine (CL Q3)	(Spain) CN Terrassa (CL Q3)

=== Phases and rounds dates ===
The schedule of the competition is as follows.

Phase	Round	First leg	Second leg
Qualifying	Qualification round I	28–30 September 2018	
Qualifying	Qualification round II	12–14 October 2018	
Knockout stage	Quarter-finals	21 November 2018	5 December 2018
Knockout stage	Semi-finals	23 January 2019	27 February 2019
Knockout stage	Final	30 March 2019	13 April 2019

== Qualifying rounds ==
=== Qualification round I ===
==== Group A ====
Pos	Team	Pld	W	D	L	GF	GA	GD	Pts	Qualification	(Hungary) BUD	(Croatia) PRI	(Serbia) PAR	(Germany) DUI
1	(Hungary) OSC Budapest	3	3	0	0	53	18	+35	9	Round II	—		17–7	
2	(Croatia) VK Primorje (H)	3	2	0	1	29	26	+3	6	Round II	7–15	—	13–6	9–5
3	(Serbia) VK Partizan	3	1	0	2	26	38	−12	3				—	13–8
4	(Germany) ASC Duisburg	3	0	0	3	17	43	−26	0		4–21			—

Source: LEN
(H) Hosts

==== Group B ====
Pos	Team	Pld	W	D	L	GF	GA	GD	Pts	Qualification	(France) MAR	(Croatia) MOR	(Italy) SAV	(Germany) BER
1	(France) CN Marseille	3	3	0	0	37	12	+25	9	Round II	—			15–0
2	(Croatia) VK Mornar	3	2	0	1	29	19	+10	6	Round II	8–10	—		
3	(Italy) RN Savona (H)	3	1	0	2	19	24	−5	3		4–12	5–6	—	10–6
4	(Germany) SG Neukölln Berlin	3	0	0	3	10	40	−30	0			4–15		—

Source: LEN
(H) Hosts

==== Group C ====
Pos	Team	Pld	W	D	L	GF	GA	GD	Pts	Qualification	(Spain) BAR	(Hungary) BVS	(France) NIC
1	(Spain) CN Barcelona (H)	2	2	0	0	19	16	+3	6	Round II	—		
2	(Hungary) BVSC-Zuglo	2	1	0	1	26	18	+8	3	Round II	8–9	—	
3	(France) Olympic Nice	3	1	0	2	17	28	−11	3		8–10	9–18	—

Source: LEN
(H) Hosts

==== Group D ====
Pos	Team	Pld	W	D	L	GF	GA	GD	Pts	Qualification	(Montenegro) PRI	(Italy) ORT	(Greece) YDR	(Serbia) NAI
1	(Montenegro) Primorac Kotor	3	3	0	0	33	21	+12	9	Round II	—	9–5		15–8
2	(Italy) CC Ortigia	3	2	0	1	22	19	+3	6	Round II		—		
3	(Greece) NC Ydraikos (H)	3	1	0	2	21	19	+2	3		8–9	5–6	—	8–4
4	(Serbia) VK Nais	3	0	0	3	17	34	−17	0			5–11		—

Source: LEN
(H) Hosts

=== Qualification round II ===
==== Group E ====
Pos	Team	Pld	W	D	L	GF	GA	GD	Pts	Qualification	(Hungary) BUD	(Italy) ORT	(Spain) BAR	(Croatia) MOR
1	(Hungary) OSC Budapest	3	3	0	0	41	17	+24	9	Quarter-finals	—		13–6	
2	(Italy) CC Ortigia (H)	3	2	0	1	27	29	−2	6	Quarter-finals	8–14	—		10–9
3	(Spain) CN Barcelona	3	1	0	2	23	30	−7	3			6–9	—	11–8
4	(Croatia) VK Mornar	3	0	0	3	20	35	−15	0		3–14			—

Source: LEN
(H) Hosts

==== Group F ====
Pos	Team	Pld	W	D	L	GF	GA	GD	Pts	Qualification	(France) MAR	(Montenegro) KOT	(Hungary) BVS	(Croatia) PRI
1	(France) CN Marseille (H)	3	3	0	0	36	19	+17	9	Quarter-finals	—	10–7	12–6	14–6
2	(Montenegro) Primorac Kotor	3	2	0	1	32	27	+5	6	Quarter-finals		—		16–11
3	(Hungary) BVSC-Zuglo	3	1	0	2	24	28	−4	3			6–9	—	
4	(Croatia) VK Primorje	3	0	0	3	24	42	−18	0				7–12	—

Source: LEN
(H) Hosts

== Knockout stage ==
=== Bracket ===
Quarter-finals
(France) Strasbourg	9	6	15
(France) CN Marseille	7	12	19
(Italy) Ortigia Siracusa	7	9	16
(Greece) Vouliagmeni	8	6	14
(Montenegro) Primorac Kotor	9	6	15
(Montenegro) Jadran Carine	11	15	26
(Spain) CN Terrassa	9	7	16
(Hungary) OSC Budapest	9	10	19

Semi-finals
(France) CN Marseille	7	10	17
(Italy) Ortigia Siracusa	4	4	8
(Montenegro) Jadran Carine	11	13	24
(Hungary) OSC Budapest	10	12	22

Final
(France) CN Marseille	9	7	16
(Montenegro) Jadran Carine	8	7	15

=== Quarter-finals ===
Team 1	Agg.	Team 2	1st leg	2nd leg
Strasbourg (France)	15–19	(France) CN Marseille	9–7	6–12
Ortigia Siracusa (Italy)	16–14	(Greece) Vouliagmeni	7–8	9–6
Primorac Kotor (Montenegro)	15–26	(Montenegro) Jadran Carine	9–11	6–15
CN Terrassa (Spain)	16–19	(Hungary) OSC Budapest	9–9	7–10

=== Semi-finals ===
Team 1	Agg.	Team 2	1st leg	2nd leg
Jadran Carine (Montenegro)	24–22	(Hungary) OSC Budapest	11–10	13–12
CN Marseille (France)	17–8	(Italy) Ortigia Siracusa	7–4	10–4

=== Final ===
Team 1	Agg.	Team 2	1st leg	2nd leg
CN Marseille (France)	16–15	(Montenegro) Jadran Carine	9–8	7–7

2018–19 LEN Euro Cup
Champions

CN Marseille
1st Cup

== See also ==
- 2018–19 LEN Champions League
