= Uroš Čučković =

Montenegrin water polo player

Personal information
- Nationality: Montenegrin
- Born: 25 April 1990 (age 36) Kotor, SR Montenegro, SFR Yugoslavia
- Height: 199 cm (6 ft 6 in)
- Weight: 100 kg (220 lb)

Sport
- Country: Montenegro
- Sport: Water polo
- Club: Eger; CN Marseille
Medal record
European Championship
Bronze medal – third place	2020 Budapest	Team
Mediterranean Games
Bronze medal – third place	2018 Tarragona	Team

Uroš Čučković (Serbian Cyrillic: Урош Чучковић; born 25 April 1990) is a Montenegrin professional water polo player. He was part of the Montenegrin team at the 2016 Summer Olympics, where the team finished in fourth place. He is 6 ft 7 in (201 cm) tall and weighs 227 lb (103 kg).
