= Dejan Lazović =

Montenegrin water polo player

Personal information
- National team: Montenegro
- Born: 8 February 1990 (age 36) Budva, Montenegro, Yugoslavia
- Height: 1.98 m (6 ft 6 in)
- Weight: 102 kg (225 lb)

Sport
- Country: Montenegro
- Sport: Water polo
- Position: Goalkeeper
- Club: VPS; Pallanuoto Trieste 2024- CN Marseille 2020-2024; Pallanuoto Sport Management 2015-2020; VK Primorje Rijeka 2013-2014; VK Budva 2008-2013
Medal record
World Championships
Silver medal – second place	2013 Barcelona	Team
European Championship
Gold medal – first place	2008 Málaga
Silver medal – second place	2012 Eindhoven
Silver medal – second place	2016 Belgrade
Bronze medal – third place	2020 Budapest
FINA World League
Gold medal – first place	2018 Budapest
Gold medal – first place	2009 Podgorica
Silver medal – second place	2010 Niš
Bronze medal – third place	2013 Chelyabinsk
Bronze medal – third place	2014 Dubai
Mediterranean Games
Bronze medal – third place	2018 Tarragona

Dejan Lazović (Serbian Cyrillic: Дејан Лазовић; born 8 February 1990) is a Montenegrin professional water polo player. He is currently playing for the VPS and Italian Pallanuoto Trieste. He is 6 ft 6 in (199 cm) tall and weighs 225 lb (102 kg).
