= Marko Jelača =

Georgian water polo player

Personal information
- Nationality: Georgian
- Born: 15 December 1982 (age 43) Croatia
- Height: 2.05 m (6 ft 9 in)
- Weight: 105 kg (231 lb)

Sport
- Sport: Water polo
- Handedness: Right
- Position: Defender
- Current club: CC Ortigia

Senior clubs
- Years: Team
- CC Ortigia
National team
- Years: Team
- Georgia

Marko Jelača (born 15 December 1982) is a Georgian water polo player for CC Ortigia and the Georgian national team.

He participated at the 2018 Men's European Water Polo Championship.
