= Slaven Kandić =

Montenegrin water polo player

Personal information
- Nationality: Montenegro
- Born: 2 April 1991 (age 33)

Sport
- Sport: Water polo

Slaven Kandić (born 2 April 1991) is a Montenegrin water polo player. He competed in the 2020 Summer Olympics.
