= Soma Vogel =

Hungarian water polo player

Personal information
- Full name: Soma Vogel
- Nationality: Hungarian
- Born: 7 July 1997 (age 29) Budapest, Hungary
- Height: 198 cm (78 in)
- Weight: 80 kg (176 lb)

Sport
- Sport: Water polo
- Handedness: Right
- Position: Goalkeeper
- Current club: Ferencváros

Youth career
- Years: Team
- 2006–2013: Ferencváros

Senior clubs
- Years: Team
- 2013–present: Ferencváros
National team
Years	Team	Apps
2017–	Hungary	64
Medal record
Men's water polo
Representing Hungary
Olympic Games
Bronze medal – third place	2020 Tokyo	Team
World Championships
Gold medal – first place	2023 Fukuoka	Team
European Championship
Gold medal – first place	2020 Budapest
Silver medal – second place	2022 Split
Silver medal – second place	2026 Belgrade
- Updated on 1 August 2023

Soma Vogel (born 7 July 1997) is a Hungarian water polo player. He competed in the 2020 Summer Olympics.

== Achievements ==
- LEN Champions League:
  - (gold) 2024
  - (gold) 2019
