= Stefan Vidović =

Montenegrin water polo player

Personal information
- Nationality: Montenegrin
- Born: 8 August 1992 (age 33) Kotor, FR Yugoslavia

Sport
- Sport: Water polo

Stefan Vidović (born 8 August 1992) is a Montenegrin water polo player. He competed in the 2020 Summer Olympics.
