= Petar Tešanović =

Montenegrin water polo player

Personal information
- Nationality: Montenegrin
- Born: 26 November 1998 (age 26)
- Height: 1.95 m (6 ft 5 in)

Sport
- Sport: Water polo
- Club: AN BRESCIA

Petar Tešanović (born 26 November 1998) is a Montenegrin water polo player. He competed in the 2020 Summer Olympics.
