= Vlado Popadić =

Montenegrin water polo player (born 1996)

Personal information
- Nationality: Montenegrin
- Born: 25 April 1996 (age 30)

Sport
- Sport: Water polo

Vlado Popadić (born 25 April 1996) is a Montenegrin water polo player. He competed in the 2020 Summer Olympics.
