= Vladan Spaić =

Montenegrin water polo player

Personal information
- Nationality: Montenegrin
- Born: 8 June 1997 (age 29) Cetinje, Montenegro, FR Yugoslavia
- Height: 1.89 m (6 ft 2 in)
- Weight: 100 kg (220 lb)

Sport
- Country: Montenegro
- Sport: Water polo
- Club: CN Marseille
Medal record
Men's water polo
Representing Montenegro
European Championship
Bronze medal – third place	2020 Budapest
Mediterranean Games
Silver medal – second place	2026 Taranto	Team

Vladan Spaić (Serbian Cyrillic: Владан Спаић; born 18 June 1997) is a Montenegrin water polo player. He is currently playing for the CN Marseille. He is 6 ft 2 1/2 in (189.2 cm) tall and weighs 227 pounds (103 kg).
