= CN Marseille =

Swim club in Marseille, France

Coordinates: 43°17′30.12″N 5°21′20.29″E

- Founded: 1921
- League: Championnat de France
- Based in: Marseille
- Arena: Pierre Garsau, Marseille
- Colors
- President: Paul Leccia
- Head coach: Julien Jacquier (swimming); Franck Esposito (swimming); Miloš Šćepanović (water-polo)
- Championships: 1 LEN Euro Cup; 42 French Leagues; 15 French Cups; 2 French League Cups
- Website: cnmarseille.com

The Cercle des nageurs de Marseille (Circle of Marseille's swimmers) is an elite swim club based in Marseille, France, founded in 1921. It is best known for its water polo team which is the most decorated in France, and also for training many of the French Olympic swimmers, including Frédérick Bousquet, Fabien Gilot, Camille Lacourt, Florent Manaudou, Laure Manaudou and others.

== Facilities ==
Located at the east of the city, next to the sea, the club has 3 pools, 2 covered (one long course, one short course) and one outside short course.

== Waterpolo ==
=== Honours ===
==== Domestic competitions ====
- National Championship (42): 1965, 1966, 1967, 1968, 1969, 1970, 1973, 1974, 1975, 1976, 1977, 1978, 1979, 1980, 1981, 1982, 1983, 1984, 1985, 1986, 1987, 1988, 1989, 1990, 1991, 1996, 2005, 2006, 2007, 2008, 2009, 2010, 2011, 2013, 2015, 2016, 2017, 2021, 2022, 2023, 2024, 2025
- National Cup (15): 1991, 1996, 1997, 1998, 1999, 2007, 2009, 2010, 2011, 2012, 2013, 2022, 2023, 2024, 2025
- League Cup (2): 2015, 2018.

==== European competitions ====
- LEN Euro Cup

Winners (1): 2019

=== Notable players ===
- (France) Michaël Bodegas
- (France) Ugo Crousillat
- (Croatia) Ante Vukičević
- (Montenegro) Uroš Čučković
- (Montenegro) Mlađan Janović
- (Montenegro) Dejan Lazović
- (Montenegro) Miloš Šćepanović
- (Montenegro) Vladan Spaić
- (Serbia) Andrija Prlainović
