= 2023–24 LEN Champions League Final Four =

Men's water polo competition

Tournament details
- Host country: Malta
- Venue: 1 (in 1 host city)
- Dates: 5–7 June
- Teams: 4

Final positions
- Champions: (Hungary) FTC-Telekom (2nd title)
- Runners-up: (Italy) Pro Recco
- Third place: (Greece) Olympiacos Piraeus
- Fourth place: (Serbia) Novi Beograd

Tournament statistics
- Matches played: 4
- Goals scored: 97 (24.25 per match)
- Top scorer: (Serbia) Dušan Mandić (9 goals)

The 2023–24 LEN Champions League Final Four was the season-ending event that decided the champions of the 2023–24 LEN Champions League. The Final Four tournament was held at the National Pool Complex in Valletta, Malta.

FTC-Telekom won their second title after triumphing over Pro Recco in the final.

== Host selection ==
Starting this season, a Final Four tournament was played instead of a Final Eight. On 14 January 2024, Maltese media reported that the Aquatic Sports Association of Malta were in advanced talks with LEN over organizing the Final Four. On 18 January 2024, LEN announced that Valletta would host all Final Four tournaments over the next three seasons.

The Final Four was originally slated for 6–8 June, but the schedule was moved up by a day in order to not coincide with the European Parliament Elections which were held in Malta on 8 June.

== Teams ==
Teams qualified by finishing first and second in the 2023–24 LEN Champions League Quarter-finals round.

Qualified teams

- (Hungary) FTC-Telekom
- (Serbia) Novi Beograd
- (Greece) Olympiacos Piraeus
- (Italy) Pro Recco

=== Group A ===
Pos	Team	Pld	W	PSW	PSL	L	GF	GA	GD	Pts	Qualification
1	(Italy) Pro Recco	6	5	1	0	0	88	58	+30	17	Final Four
2	(Serbia) Novi Beograd	6	4	0	1	1	78	74	+4	13	Final Four
3	(France) CN Marseille	6	2	0	0	4	72	76	−4	6	
4	(Croatia) Jadran Split	6	0	0	0	6	62	92	−30	0	

Source: LEN Champions League

=== Group B ===
Pos	Team	Pld	W	PSW	PSL	L	GF	GA	GD	Pts	Qualification
1	(Hungary) FTC-Telekom	6	5	0	0	1	62	55	+7	15	Final Four
2	(Greece) Olympiacos Piraeus	6	4	1	0	1	78	68	+10	14	Final Four
3	(Spain) Zodiac Atlètic-Barceloneta	6	2	0	1	3	68	65	+3	7	
4	(Italy) AN Brescia	6	0	0	0	6	54	74	−20	0	

Source: LEN Champions League

== Venue ==
The venue for this competition was the National Pool Complex in Valletta, Malta.

== Bracket ==
Semi-finals
5 June
(Italy) Pro Recco (PSO)	13
(Greece) Olympiacos Piraeus	11
5 June
(Hungary) FTC-Telekom (PSO)	18
(Serbia) Novi Beograd	17

Final
7 June
(Italy) Pro Recco	11
(Hungary) FTC-Telekom	12
Third place
7 June
(Greece) Olympiacos Piraeus	9
(Serbia) Novi Beograd	6

=== Semi-finals ===
5 June 2024; 19:00	Report	Pro Recco (Italy)	13–11 (PSO)	(Greece) Olympiacos Piraeus	National Pool Complex, Valletta; Referees: Adrian Tiberiu Alexandrescu (ROU), Sebastien Dervieux (FRA)
5 June 2024; 19:00	Report	Score by quarters: 3–0, 1–2, 3–3, 2–4 PSO: 4–2			National Pool Complex, Valletta; Referees: Adrian Tiberiu Alexandrescu (ROU), Sebastien Dervieux (FRA)
5 June 2024; 19:00	Report	Di Fulvio, Younger 2	Goals	Genidounias 3	National Pool Complex, Valletta; Referees: Adrian Tiberiu Alexandrescu (ROU), Sebastien Dervieux (FRA)

5 June 2024; 21:00	Report	FTC-Telekom (Hungary)	18–17 (PSO)	(Serbia) Novi Beograd	National Pool Complex, Valletta; Referees: Boris Margeta (SLO), David Gomez (ESP)
5 June 2024; 21:00	Report	Score by quarters: 4–4, 3–2, 5–4, 1–3 PSO: 5–4			National Pool Complex, Valletta; Referees: Boris Margeta (SLO), David Gomez (ESP)
5 June 2024; 21:00	Report	Mandić 5	Goals	Vlachopoulos 4	National Pool Complex, Valletta; Referees: Boris Margeta (SLO), David Gomez (ESP)

=== Third place match ===
7 June 2024; 19:00	Report	Olympiacos Piraeus (Greece)	9–6	(Serbia) Novi Beograd	National Pool Complex, Valletta; Referees: Frank Ohme (GER), Andrej Franulović (CRO)
7 June 2024; 19:00	Report	Score by quarters: 4–1, 3–3, 1–1, 1–1			National Pool Complex, Valletta; Referees: Frank Ohme (GER), Andrej Franulović (CRO)
7 June 2024; 19:00	Report	Fountoulis 3	Goals	Ćuk 2	National Pool Complex, Valletta; Referees: Frank Ohme (GER), Andrej Franulović (CRO)

=== Final ===
7 June 2024; 21:00	Report	Pro Recco (Italy)	11–12	(Hungary) FTC-Telekom	National Pool Complex, Valletta; Attendance: 3,000; Referees: Boris Margeta (SLO), Adrian Tiberiu Alexandrescu (ROU)
7 June 2024; 21:00	Report	Score by quarters: 2–2, 2–4, 3–3, 4–3			National Pool Complex, Valletta; Attendance: 3,000; Referees: Boris Margeta (SLO), Adrian Tiberiu Alexandrescu (ROU)
7 June 2024; 21:00	Report	four players 2	Goals	Mandić 4	National Pool Complex, Valletta; Attendance: 3,000; Referees: Boris Margeta (SLO), Adrian Tiberiu Alexandrescu (ROU)

2023–24 LEN Champions League Champions

FTC-Telekom
2nd title

== See also ==
- 2023–24 LEN Euro Cup
- 2023–24 LEN Challenger Cup
- 2023 LEN Super Cup
- 2023–24 LEN Women's Champions League
- 2023–24 LEN Women's Euro Cup
- 2023–24 LEN Women's Challenger Cup
- 2023 LEN Women's Super Cup
