= 2024 European Aquatics Women's Super Cup =

Water polo match

Tournament details
- Arena: Can Llong pool, Sabadell, Spain
- Dates: 18 October 2024

Final positions
- Champions: (Spain) Astralpool Sabadell (5th title)
- Runners-up: (Italy) Antenore Plebiscito Padova

Awards and statistics
- Top scorer(s): (Netherlands) Simone van de Kraats (4 goals)

The 2024 European Aquatics Women's Super Cup was the 18th edition of the annual trophy organised by LEN and contested by the reigning champions of the two European competitions for women's water polo clubs. The match was between European champions Astralpool Sabadell (winners of the 2023–24 LEN Women's Champions League) and Antenore Plebiscito Padova (winners of the 2023–24 LEN Women's Euro Cup). The match was held on 18 October 2024.

Astralpool Sabadell won their fifth title with a win over Antenore Plebiscito Padova in the Super Cup.

== Teams ==
Team	Qualification	Previous participation (bold indicates winners)
(Spain) Astralpool Sabadell	Winners of the 2023–24 LEN Women's Champions League	2011, **2013**, **2014**, **2016**, 2019, **2023**
(Italy) Antenore Plebiscito Padova	Winners of the 2023–24 LEN Women's Euro Cup	2015

== Venue ==
The venue is the Can Llong pool in Sabadell.

== Final ==
18 October; 19:00	Report	**Astralpool Sabadell** (Spain)	**19**–7	(Italy) Antenore Plebiscito Padova	Can Llong pool, Sabadell; Referees: Aurely Blanchard (FRA), Nora Debrecen (HUN)
18 October; 19:00	Report	Score by quarters: **4**–0, **7**–2, **6**–3, 2–2			Can Llong pool, Sabadell; Referees: Aurely Blanchard (FRA), Nora Debrecen (HUN)
18 October; 19:00	Report	van de Kraats 4	**Goals**	Schaap 3	Can Llong pool, Sabadell; Referees: Aurely Blanchard (FRA), Nora Debrecen (HUN)

2024 European Aquatics Women's Super Cup Champions

**Astralpool Sabadell**
Fifth title

== See also ==
- 2024–25 European Aquatics Champions League
- 2024–25 European Aquatics Euro Cup
- 2024–25 European Aquatics Challenger Cup
- 2024 European Aquatics Super Cup
- 2024–25 European Aquatics Women's Champions League
- 2024–25 European Aquatics Women's Euro Cup
- 2024–25 European Aquatics Women's Challenger Cup
