= 2022–23 LEN Women's Euro Cup =

European water polo tournament

- League: Women's LEN Euro Cup
- Sport: Water Polo
- Duration: 13 January 2023 – 29 March 2023
- Teams: 16 (from 9 countries)
- Finals champions: (Hungary) UVSE Budapest (2nd title)
- Runners-up: (Hungary) Ferencvaros

Women's LEN Trophy seasons
- 2021–22 2023–24 →

The 2022–23 Women's LEN Euro Cup is the 24th edition of the European second-tier tournament for women's water polo clubs. Sixteen teams participated in the competition. Ethnikos Piraeus is the defending champion.

== Revamp ==
Starting this season, the tournament was renamed the LEN Women's Euro Cup. The competition also included an expanded format, featuring 16 clubs, rather than the old final four format between the four losing Champions League quarterfinalists. The new format was created to give more club opportunities in women's water polo.

== Schedule ==
=== Rounds and dates ===
Phase	Round	Round date
Group Stage	Group Stage	13–15 January 2023
Quarter-Finals	First Leg	28 January 2023
Quarter-Finals	Second Leg	11 February 2023
Semi-Finals	First leg	25 February 2023
Semi-Finals	Second leg	11 March 2023
Final	First Leg	25 March 2023
Final	Second Leg	29 March 2023

== Preliminary round ==
The sixteen teams are split into four groups of four teams with the top two teams from each group qualifying for the quarterfinals.

=== Group A ===
The group was held in Piraeus, Greece.

Pos	Team	Pld	W	D	L	GF	GA	GD	Pts	Qualification	(Greece) ETH	(Hungary) EGE	(France) NIC	(Malta) SIR
1	(Greece) Ethnikos Piraeus (H)	3	3	0	0	53	23	+30	9	Quarterfinals	—	12–11	15–9	26–3
2	(Hungary) Eger	3	2	0	1	57	24	+33	6	Quarterfinals		—	18–9	
3	(France) Olympic Nice	3	1	0	2	34	37	−3	3				—	16–4
4	(Malta) Sirens ASC	3	0	0	3	10	70	−60	0			3–28		—

Source: Report
(H) Hosts

=== Group B ===
The group was held in Mulhouse, France.

Pos	Team	Pld	W	D	L	GF	GA	GD	Pts	Qualification	(Hungary) FER	(Hungary) USVE	(France) MUL	(France) NAN
1	(Hungary) Ferencvaros	3	3	0	0	53	22	+31	9	Quarterfinals	—			
2	(Hungary) UVSE Budapest	3	2	0	1	42	20	+22	6	Quarterfinals	8–10	—		
3	(France) Mulhouse WP (H)	3	1	0	2	26	40	−14	3		5–18	6–17	—	15–5
4	(France) Grand Nancy AC	3	0	0	3	18	57	−39	0		9–25	4–17		—

Source: Report
(H) Hosts

=== Group C ===
The group was held in Lille, France.

Pos	Team	Pld	W	D	L	GF	GA	GD	Pts	Qualification	(Greece) VOU	(France) LIL	(Netherlands) ZVL	(Germany) SPA
1	(Greece) NC Vouliagmeni	3	3	0	0	60	29	+31	9	Quarterfinals	—			23–8
2	(France) Lille UC (H)	3	2	0	1	51	33	+18	6	Quarterfinals	15–19	—	16–7	20–7
3	(Netherlands) ZVL 1886	3	1	0	2	28	46	−18	3		6–18		—	
4	(Germany) Spandau 04	3	0	0	3	27	58	−31	0				12–15	—

Source: Report
(H) Hosts

=== Group D ===
The group was held in Porto, Portugal.

Pos	Team	Pld	W	D	L	GF	GA	GD	Pts	Qualification	(Italy) PAD	(Spain) TER	(Netherlands) ZAAN	(Portugal) PAC
1	(Italy) Plebiscito Padova	3	2	0	1	49	20	+29	6 (Note: Head-to-head goal difference: Padova 2, Terrassa 0, De Zaan –2.)	Quarterfinals	—		8–10	
2	(Spain) CN Terrassa	3	2	0	1	46	20	+26	6	Quarterfinals	7–11	—		
3	(Netherlands) ZV De Zaan	3	2	0	1	53	25	+28	6			6–10	—	37–7
4	(Portugal) CA Pacense (H)	3	0	0	3	13	96	−83	0		3–30	3–29		—

Source: Report
(H) Hosts

== Knockout stage ==
The draw for the Knockout stage was made on the 16 of January 2023.

=== Bracket ===
Quarterfinals
(Greece) Ethnikos	10	9	19
(Hungary) UVSE Budapest	10	13	23
(Hungary) Tigra Eger	12	19	31 PS
(Greece) Vouliagmeni	15	15	30
(Hungary) Ferencvaros	7	14	21
(Spain) CN Terrassa	9	9	18
(Italy) Plebiscito Padova	12	11	23
(France) Lille UC	10	5	15

Semifinals
(Hungary) UVSE Budapest	12	10	22
(Hungary) Tigra Eger	12	6	18
(Hungary) Ferencvaros	12	7	19
(Italy) Plebiscito Padova	9	9	18

Final
(Hungary) UVSE Budapest	8	13	21
(Hungary) Ferencvaros	9	9	18

=== Quarterfinals ===
Team 1	Agg.	Team 2	1st leg	2nd leg
Ethnikos (Greece)	19–23	(Hungary) UVSE Budapest	10–10	9–13
Ferencvaros (Hungary)	21–18	(Spain) CN Terrassa	7–9	14–9
Vouliagmeni (Greece)	30–31 (Note: Order of legs reversed after original draw.).	(Hungary) Tigra Eger	15–12	15–19 (Note: Eger won 5–4 on penalties (14–11 in regulation))
Plebiscito Padova (Italy)	23–15.	(France) Lille UC	12–10	11–5

=== Semifinals ===
Team 1	Agg.	Team 2	1st leg	2nd leg
Plebiscito Padova (Italy)	18–19	(Hungary) Ferencvaros	9–12	9–7
Tigra Eger (Hungary)	18–22	(Hungary) UVSE Budapest	12–12	6–10

=== Final ===
Team 1	Agg.	Team 2	1st leg	2nd leg
UVSE Budapest (Hungary)	21–18	(Hungary) Ferencvaros	8–9	13–9

== See also ==
- 2022–23 LEN Women's Champions League
- 2023 LEN Women's Super Cup
- 2022–23 LEN Champions League
- 2022–23 LEN Euro Cup
- 2022–23 LEN Challenger Cup
- 2023 LEN Super Cup
