= 2023–24 LEN Euro Cup knockout stage =

2024–25 LEN Euro Cup knockout stage
Tournament information
- Sport: Water polo
- Dates: 8 March–18 May 2024
- Website: Official website

The 2023–24 LEN Euro Cup knockout stage details the matches played to decide the teams that made the final four of the tournament.

== Qualified teams ==
The knockout phase involves 16 teams: the eight teams which qualified as winners and runners-ups of each of the four groups in the group stage, and the eight third and fourth placed teams from the Champions League group stage.

=== Euro Cup group stage winners and runners-up ===
Group	Winners	Runners-up
A	(Spain) CN Barcelona	(France) EN Tourcoing
B	(Italy) RN Savona	(Hungary) A-Híd Vasas Plaket
C	(Croatia) Primorje Erste Bank Rijeka	(Hungary) BVSC-Zugló
D	(Greece) Panionios GSS	(Italy) CC Ortigia

=== Eliminated teams from Champions League ===
Group	Third place	Fourth place
A	(Spain) Astralpool Sabadell	(Romania) Steaua București
B	(Croatia) Jug AO Dubrovnik	(Georgia (country)) Dinamo Tbilisi
C	(Serbia) Crvena zvezda	(Montenegro) Jadran Herceg Novi
D	(Germany) Spandau 04	(Greece) NC Vouliagmeni

== Draw ==
The draw took place in Barcelona on 15 December 2023. The teams were split into two draws, one containing the four teams who finished fourth in the Champions League group stage, who would be pitted up against a Euro Cup group winner. The other half of the draw would see the third place teams from the Champions League group stage be drawn against a runner up of the Euro Cup group stage.

Fourth in Champions League Team (Romania) Steaua București (Georgia (country)) Dinamo Tbilisi (Montenegro) Jadran Herceg Novi (Greece) NC Vouliagmeni	First in Euro Cup Team (Spain) CN Barcelona (Italy) RN Savona (Croatia) Primorje Erste Bank Rijeka (Greece) Panionios GSS

Third in Champions League Team (Spain) Astralpool Sabadell (Croatia) Jug AO Dubrovnik (Serbia) Crvena zvezda (Germany) Spandau 04	Second in Euro Cup Team (France) EN Tourcoing (Hungary) A-Híd Vasas Plaket (Hungary) BVSC-Zugló (Italy) CC Ortigia

== Bracket ==
Eight-finals
8 March/23 March
(Italy) CC Ortigia	8	12	20
(Germany) Spandau 04	8	14	22
8 March/23 March
(Montenegro) Jadran Herceg Novi	10	13	23
(Italy) RN Savona	16	12	28
8 March/23 March
(Spain) Astralpool Sabadell	18	15	33
(France) EN Tourcoing	11	12	23
8 March/23 March
(Romania) Steaua București	11	20 PS	31
(Greece) Panionios GSS	12	18	30
8 March/23 March
(Serbia) Crvena zvezda	11	12	23
(Hungary) BVSC-Zugló	13	9	22
8 March/23 March
(Hungary) A-Híd Vasas Plaket	11	8	19
(Croatia) Jug AO Dubrovnik	12	9	21
8 March/23 March
(Georgia (country)) Dinamo Tbilisi	7	15	22
(Croatia) Primorje Erste Bank Rijeka	8	20	28
8 March/23 March
(Greece) NC Vouliagmeni	17	10	27
(Spain) CN Barcelona	13	6	19

Quarter-finals
6 April/27 April
(Germany) Spandau 04	11	12	23
(Italy) RN Savona	10	10	20
6 April/27 April
(Spain) Astralpool Sabadell	6	7	13
(Romania) Steaua București	5	6	11
9 April/27 April
(Serbia) Crvena zvezda	9	10	19
(Croatia) Jug AO Dubrovnik	15	14	29
6 April/27 April
(Croatia) Primorje Erste Bank Rijeka	9	15	24
(Greece) NC Vouliagmeni	14	9	23

== Eight-finals ==
Team 1	Agg.	Team 2	1st leg	2nd leg
Jug AO Dubrovnik (Croatia)	21–19	(Hungary) A-Híd Vasas Plaket	12–11	9–8
BVSC-Zugló (Hungary)	22–23	(Serbia) Crvena zvezda	13–11	9–12
Spandau 04 (Germany)	22–20	(Italy) CC Ortigia	8–8	14–12
Astralpool Sabadell (Spain)	33–23	(France) EN Tourcoing	18–11	15–12
Panionios GSS (Greece)	30–31	(Romania) Steaua București	12–11	18–20 PS
Primorje Erste Bank Rijeka (Croatia)	28–22	(Georgia (country)) Dinamo Tbilisi	8–7	20–15
RN Savona (Italy)	28–23	(Montenegro) Jadran Herceg Novi	16–10	12–13
CN Barcelona (Spain)	19–27	(Greece) NC Vouliagmeni	13–17	6–10

=== Matches ===
8 March 2024; 19:00	Report	Jug AO Dubrovnik (Croatia)	12–11	(Hungary) A-Híd Vasas Plaket	Dubrovnik, Croatia; Referees: Adrian Tiberiu Alexandrescu (ROU), Julien Bourges (FRA)
8 March 2024; 19:00	Report	Score by quarters: 2–2, 5–3, 2–2, 3–4			Dubrovnik, Croatia; Referees: Adrian Tiberiu Alexandrescu (ROU), Julien Bourges (FRA)
8 March 2024; 19:00	Report	Cabañas 4	Goals	Gergely 4	Dubrovnik, Croatia; Referees: Adrian Tiberiu Alexandrescu (ROU), Julien Bourges (FRA)

23 March 2024; 20:30	Report	A-Híd Vasas Plaket (Hungary)	8–9	(Croatia) Jug AO Dubrovnik	Budapest, Hungary; Referees: Xavier Buch (ESP), Alessandro Severo (ITA)
23 March 2024; 20:30	Report	Score by quarters: 1–4, 2–2, 3–1, 2–2			Budapest, Hungary; Referees: Xavier Buch (ESP), Alessandro Severo (ITA)
23 March 2024; 20:30	Report	Dedović, Ákos 2	Goals	Lazic 3	Budapest, Hungary; Referees: Xavier Buch (ESP), Alessandro Severo (ITA)

Jug AO Dubrovnik won 21–19 on aggregate

8 March 2024; 20:00	Report	BVSC-Zugló (Hungary)	13–11	(Serbia) Crvena zvezda	Budapest, Hungary; Referees: Raffaele Colombo (ITA), Pau Segurana (ESP)
8 March 2024; 20:00	Report	Score by quarters: 3–2, 3–3, 3–2, 4–4			Budapest, Hungary; Referees: Raffaele Colombo (ITA), Pau Segurana (ESP)
8 March 2024; 20:00	Report	Miklós 4	Goals	Subotić 5	Budapest, Hungary; Referees: Raffaele Colombo (ITA), Pau Segurana (ESP)

23 March 2024; 20:15	Report	Crvena zvezda (Serbia)	12–9	(Hungary) BVSC-Zugló	Belgrade, Serbia; Referees: Sebastien Dervieux (FRA), Konstantinos Vasileiou (GRE)
23 March 2024; 20:15	Report	Score by quarters: 4–4, 3–2, 3–2, 2–1			Belgrade, Serbia; Referees: Sebastien Dervieux (FRA), Konstantinos Vasileiou (GRE)
23 March 2024; 20:15	Report	Vasić 3	Goals	Dávid 4	Belgrade, Serbia; Referees: Sebastien Dervieux (FRA), Konstantinos Vasileiou (GRE)

Crvena zvezda won 23–22 on aggregate

8 March 2024; 19:30	Report	Spandau 04 (Germany)	8–8	(Italy) CC Ortigia	Berlin, Germany; Referees: Georgios Stavridis (GRE), Sinisa Matijasevic (MNE)
8 March 2024; 19:30	Report	Score by quarters: 1–2, 2–2, 1–3, 4–1			Berlin, Germany; Referees: Georgios Stavridis (GRE), Sinisa Matijasevic (MNE)
8 March 2024; 19:30	Report	Tkáč 2	Goals	Inaba 3	Berlin, Germany; Referees: Georgios Stavridis (GRE), Sinisa Matijasevic (MNE)

23 March 2024; 19:00	Report	CC Ortigia (Italy)	12–14	(Germany) Spandau 04	Milan, Italy; Referees: Tamas Kovacs-Csatlos (HUN), Juan Carlos Colominas (ESP)
23 March 2024; 19:00	Report	Score by quarters: 1–6, 2–3, 2–3, 7–2			Milan, Italy; Referees: Tamas Kovacs-Csatlos (HUN), Juan Carlos Colominas (ESP)
23 March 2024; 19:00	Report	Cassia, Ferrero 3	Goals	Ćuk 4	Milan, Italy; Referees: Tamas Kovacs-Csatlos (HUN), Juan Carlos Colominas (ESP)

Spandau 04 won 22–20 on aggregate

8 March 2024; 19:30	Report	Astralpool Sabadell (Spain)	18–11	(France) EN Tourcoing	Sabadell, Spain; Referees: Andrej Franulovic (CRO), Axel Bender (GER)
8 March 2024; 19:30	Report	Score by quarters: 4–3, 4–2, 6–4, 4–2			Sabadell, Spain; Referees: Andrej Franulovic (CRO), Axel Bender (GER)
8 March 2024; 19:30	Report	Macarro 6	Goals	Živković 4	Sabadell, Spain; Referees: Andrej Franulovic (CRO), Axel Bender (GER)

23 March 2024; 21:15	Report	EN Tourcoing (France)	12–15	(Spain) Astralpool Sabadell	Tourcoing, France; Referees: Spyridon Achladiotis (GRE), Ivan Rakovic (SRB)
23 March 2024; 21:15	Report	Score by quarters: 2–2, 5–6, 2–4, 3–3			Tourcoing, France; Referees: Spyridon Achladiotis (GRE), Ivan Rakovic (SRB)
23 March 2024; 21:15	Report	Kujacic 3	Goals	Macarro, Mallarach 3	Tourcoing, France; Referees: Spyridon Achladiotis (GRE), Ivan Rakovic (SRB)

Astralpool Sabadell won 33–23 on aggregate

8 March 2024; 20:00	Report	Panionios GSS (Greece)	12–11	(Romania) Steaua București	Athens, Greece; Referees: Andreja Stanojevic (SRB), Radoslaw Koryzna (POL)
8 March 2024; 20:00	Report	Score by quarters: 3–3, 1–2, 3–1, 5–5			Athens, Greece; Referees: Andreja Stanojevic (SRB), Radoslaw Koryzna (POL)
8 March 2024; 20:00	Report	Gounas, Moskov 4	Goals	Georgescu 6	Athens, Greece; Referees: Andreja Stanojevic (SRB), Radoslaw Koryzna (POL)

23 March 2024; 19:00	Report	Steaua București (Romania)	20–18 (PSO)	(Greece) Panionios GSS	Bucharest, Romania; Referees: Raffaele Colombo (ITA), Hendrik Schopp (GER)
23 March 2024; 19:00	Report	Score by quarters: 2–2, 3–2, 2–4, 4–2 PSO: 9–8			Bucharest, Romania; Referees: Raffaele Colombo (ITA), Hendrik Schopp (GER)
23 March 2024; 19:00	Report	Georgescu 6	Goals	Gounas, Kopeliadis 5	Bucharest, Romania; Referees: Raffaele Colombo (ITA), Hendrik Schopp (GER)

Steaua București won 31–30 on aggregate

8 March 2024; 20:00	Report	Primorje Erste Bank Rijeka (Croatia)	8–7	(Georgia (country)) Dinamo Tbilisi	Rijeka, Croatia; Referees: Nikolaos Boudramis (GRE), Jaume Teixido (ESP)
8 March 2024; 20:00	Report	Score by quarters: 3–2, 1–1, 3–2, 1–2			Rijeka, Croatia; Referees: Nikolaos Boudramis (GRE), Jaume Teixido (ESP)
8 March 2024; 20:00	Report	Brubnjak, Cubranic 2	Goals	Magrakvelidze 2	Rijeka, Croatia; Referees: Nikolaos Boudramis (GRE), Jaume Teixido (ESP)

23 March 2024; 19:00	Report	Dinamo Tbilisi (Georgia (country))	15–20	(Croatia) Primorje Erste Bank Rijeka	Tbilisi, Georgia; Referees: Veselin Miskovic (MNE), Peter de Jong (NED)
23 March 2024; 19:00	Report	Score by quarters: 4–6, 3–3, 3–6, 5–5			Tbilisi, Georgia; Referees: Veselin Miskovic (MNE), Peter de Jong (NED)
23 March 2024; 19:00	Report	three players 3	Goals	Te Riele 5	Tbilisi, Georgia; Referees: Veselin Miskovic (MNE), Peter de Jong (NED)

Primorje Erste Bank Rijeka won 28–22 on aggregate

8 March 2024; 19:00	Report	RN Savona (Italy)	16–10	(Montenegro) Jadran Herceg Novi	Savona, Italy; Referees: Michiel Zwart (NED), Matan Schwartz (ISR)
8 March 2024; 19:00	Report	Score by quarters: 3–2, 4–3, 3–3, 6–2			Savona, Italy; Referees: Michiel Zwart (NED), Matan Schwartz (ISR)
8 March 2024; 19:00	Report	Rizzo 4	Goals	Radovic 4	Savona, Italy; Referees: Michiel Zwart (NED), Matan Schwartz (ISR)

23 March 2024; 18:00	Report	Jadran Herceg Novi (Montenegro)	13–12	(Italy) RN Savona	Trebinje, Bosnia and Herzegovina (Note: The game was played in Trebinje due to Jadran Herceg Novi's home venue not meeting requirements.); Referees: Georgios Stavridis (GRE), Pau Segurana (ESP)
23 March 2024; 18:00	Report	Score by quarters: 3–4, 2–2, 5–3, 3–3			Trebinje, Bosnia and Herzegovina; Referees: Georgios Stavridis (GRE), Pau Segurana (ESP)
23 March 2024; 18:00	Report	Nagaev 4	Goals	Bruni 3	Trebinje, Bosnia and Herzegovina; Referees: Georgios Stavridis (GRE), Pau Segurana (ESP)

RN Savona won 28–23 on aggregate

8 March 2024; 20:45	Report	CN Barcelona (Spain)	13–17	(Greece) NC Vouliagmeni	Barcelona, Spain; Referees: Alessandro Severo (ITA), Paul Kovac (AUT)
8 March 2024; 20:45	Report	Score by quarters: 3–5, 2–6, 3–4, 5–2			Barcelona, Spain; Referees: Alessandro Severo (ITA), Paul Kovac (AUT)
8 March 2024; 20:45	Report	Ferrer 5	Goals	Chalyvopoulos, Kalogeropoulos 3	Barcelona, Spain; Referees: Alessandro Severo (ITA), Paul Kovac (AUT)

23 March 2024; 18:00	Report	NC Vouliagmeni (Greece)	10–6	(Spain) CN Barcelona	Athens, Greece; Referees: Nenad Peris (CRO), Vojin Putnikovic (SRB)
23 March 2024; 18:00	Report	Score by quarters: 2–2, 3–1, 3–1, 2–2			Athens, Greece; Referees: Nenad Peris (CRO), Vojin Putnikovic (SRB)
23 March 2024; 18:00	Report	four players 2	Goals	Veich 4	Athens, Greece; Referees: Nenad Peris (CRO), Vojin Putnikovic (SRB)

NC Vouliagmeni won 27–19 on aggregate

== Quarter-finals ==
The draw took place in Barcelona on 26 March 2024. There was no seeding.

Team 1	Agg.	Team 2	1st leg	2nd leg
RN Savona (Italy)	20–23	(Germany) Spandau 04	10–11	10–12
Steaua București (Romania)	11–13	(Spain) Astralpool Sabadell	5–6	6–7
Jug AO Dubrovnik (Croatia)	29–19	(Serbia) Crvena zvezda	15–9	14–10
NC Vouliagmeni (Greece)	23–24	(Croatia) Primorje Erste Bank Rijeka	14–9	9–15

=== Matches ===
6 April 2024; 19:00	Report	RN Savona (Italy)	10–11	(Germany) Spandau 04	Savona, Italy; Referees: Pau Segurana (ESP), Tamas Kovacs-Csatlos (HUN)
6 April 2024; 19:00	Report	Score by quarters: 2–2, 2–6, 2–0, 4–3			Savona, Italy; Referees: Pau Segurana (ESP), Tamas Kovacs-Csatlos (HUN)
6 April 2024; 19:00	Report	Figlioli 4	Goals	Sedlmayer, Tomasović 2	Savona, Italy; Referees: Pau Segurana (ESP), Tamas Kovacs-Csatlos (HUN)

27 April 2024; 19:30	Report	Spandau 04 (Germany)	12–10	(Italy) RN Savona	Berlin, Germany; Referees: Adrian Tiberiu Alexandrescu (ROU), Vojin Putnikovic (SRB)
27 April 2024; 19:30	Report	Score by quarters: 2–2, 4–2, 4–3, 2–3			Berlin, Germany; Referees: Adrian Tiberiu Alexandrescu (ROU), Vojin Putnikovic (SRB)
27 April 2024; 19:30	Report	Tomasović 4	Goals	Figlioli 3	Berlin, Germany; Referees: Adrian Tiberiu Alexandrescu (ROU), Vojin Putnikovic (SRB)

Spandau 04 won 23–20 on aggregate

6 April 2024; 18:00	Report	Steaua București (Romania)	5–6	(Spain) Astralpool Sabadell	Bucharest, Romania; Referees: Sebastien Dervieux (FRA), Christos Kourtidis (GRE)
6 April 2024; 18:00	Report	Score by quarters: 3–1, 0–3, 1–0, 1–2			Bucharest, Romania; Referees: Sebastien Dervieux (FRA), Christos Kourtidis (GRE)
6 April 2024; 18:00	Report	Georgescu, Iudean 2	Goals	Macarro, Mallarach 3	Bucharest, Romania; Referees: Sebastien Dervieux (FRA), Christos Kourtidis (GRE)

27 April 2024; 12:30	Report	Astralpool Sabadell (Spain)	7–6	(Romania) Steaua București	Sabadell, Spain; Referees: Raffaele Colombo (ITA), Veselin Miskovic (MNE)
27 April 2024; 12:30	Report	Score by quarters: 2–0, 2–2, 2–2, 1–2			Sabadell, Spain; Referees: Raffaele Colombo (ITA), Veselin Miskovic (MNE)
27 April 2024; 12:30	Report	Macarro, Valera 3	Goals	Georgescu 3	Sabadell, Spain; Referees: Raffaele Colombo (ITA), Veselin Miskovic (MNE)

Astralpool Sabadell won 13–11 on aggregate

9 April 2024; 19:00	Report	Jug AO Dubrovnik (Croatia)	15–9	(Serbia) Crvena zvezda	Dubrovnik, Croatia
9 April 2024; 19:00	Report	Score by quarters: 5–1, 5–3, 1–2, 4–3			Dubrovnik, Croatia
9 April 2024; 19:00	Report	three players 3	Goals	three players 2	Dubrovnik, Croatia

27 April 2024; 20:00	Report	Crvena zvezda (Serbia)	10–14	(Croatia) Jug AO Dubrovnik	Belgrade, Serbia; Referees: Frank Ohme (GER), Matan Schwartz (ISR)
27 April 2024; 20:00	Report	Score by quarters: 2–4, 3–3, 1–3, 4–4			Belgrade, Serbia; Referees: Frank Ohme (GER), Matan Schwartz (ISR)
27 April 2024; 20:00	Report	Gogov, Seman 3	Goals	Daube, Žuvela 3	Belgrade, Serbia; Referees: Frank Ohme (GER), Matan Schwartz (ISR)

Jug AO Dubrovnik won 29–19 on aggregate

6 April 2024; 18:00	Report	NC Vouliagmeni (Greece)	14–9	(Croatia) Primorje Erste Bank Rijeka	Athens, Greece; Referees: Ivan Rakovic (SRB), Julien Bourges (FRA)
6 April 2024; 18:00	Report	Score by quarters: 5–2, 2–3, 2–2, 5–2			Athens, Greece; Referees: Ivan Rakovic (SRB), Julien Bourges (FRA)
6 April 2024; 18:00	Report	Kalogeropoulos 5	Goals	Te Riele 4	Athens, Greece; Referees: Ivan Rakovic (SRB), Julien Bourges (FRA)

27 April 2024; 20:00	Report	Primorje Erste Bank Rijeka (Croatia)	15–9	(Greece) NC Vouliagmeni	Rijeka, Croatia; Referees: David Gomez (ESP), Gyorgy Kun (HUN)
27 April 2024; 20:00	Report	Score by quarters: 2–1, 5–4, 4–3, 4–1			Rijeka, Croatia; Referees: David Gomez (ESP), Gyorgy Kun (HUN)
27 April 2024; 20:00	Report	Crippa 3	Goals	Kalogeropoulos, Kapotsis 2	Rijeka, Croatia; Referees: David Gomez (ESP), Gyorgy Kun (HUN)

Primorje Erste Bank Rijeka won 24–23 on aggregate
