= 2023–24 LEN Challenger Cup =

European water polo tournament

- League: LEN Challenger Cup
- Sport: Water polo
- Duration: 19 October 2023 – 27 April 2024
- Games: 50
- Teams: 19
- Finals champions: (Turkey) Galatasaray (1st title)
- Runners-up: (Slovenia) Triglav Kranj

LEN Challenger Cup seasons
- ← 2022–23 2024–25 →

The 2023–24 LEN Challenger Cup was the 2nd edition of a water polo competition organised by the Ligue Européenne de Natation (LEN). It acts as the third tier, below the LEN Champions League and the LEN Euro Cup. The reigning champions are GS Apollon Smyrnis, but they won't defend their title due to their involvement in this season's Champions League and Euro Cup.

Galatasaray won the competition, beating Slovenian side, Triglav Kranj, in the final. They become the first men's water polo team from Turkey to win a European title.

== Format ==
This is the first season under the new changes made by LEN. 19 teams are grouped into 4 pools, three with five clubs, and one with four clubs. The pools are held by one of the clubs. The top 2 from every pool advances to the quarter-finals, followed by semi-finals and finals.

== Rankings ==
Only teams below the top 12 can enter the competition.

Rank	Association	Points	Teams
1	Italy	118,765	0
2	Hungary	91,047.5	0
3	Spain	75,387.5	0
4	Serbia	68,902.5	0
5	Greece	64,375	0
6	Croatia	56,065	0
7	France	47,207.5	0
8	Germany	41,660	0
9	Romania	19,800	0
10	Montenegro	17,700	0
11	(Georgia (country)) Georgia	11,245	0
12	Russia	10,490	0
13	Netherlands	5,005	0

Rank	Association	Points	Teams
14	Turkey	4,807.5	3
15	Slovakia	1,870	1
16	Bosnia and Herzegovina	1,415	1
17	Portugal	1,385	3
18	Switzerland	1,210	2
19	Slovenia	1,160	1
20	Israel	860	0
21	Poland	635	0
22	Denmark	560	0
23	Lithuania	515	1
24	Malta	435	1
24	Ukraine	435	0

Rank	Association	Points	Teams
NR	Belgium	0	1
NR	Bulgaria	0	1
NR	Cyprus	0	1
NR	Finland	0	1
NR	(United Kingdom) Great Britain	0	2

== Teams ==
The team were announced on 8 September 2023. Starting this season, no countries ranked in the top 12 of the LEN men's club rankings can take part in this tournament.

Participating teams
(Belgium) Royal Dauphins Mouscronnois	(Bosnia and Herzegovina) VK Banja Luka	(Bulgaria) KVT Komodor	(Cyprus) APOEL Nicosia
(Finland) Cetus Espoo	(United Kingdom) Polytechnic Water Polo Club	(United Kingdom) City Of Manchester Water Polo Club	(Lithuania) EVK Zaibas
(Malta) Valletta (Note: Valletta is actually the Maltese national team, but is playing under the name Valletta.)	(Portugal) Vitória Sport Clube	(Portugal) Clube Fluvial Portuense	Sporting Clube De Portugal
(Slovakia) KVP Novaky	(Slovenia) Triglav Kranj	(Switzerland) SC Kreuzlingen	(Switzerland) Carouge Natation
(Turkey) Galatasaray	(Turkey) ODTU Sport Club	(Turkey) Enka Istanbul	

== Schedule ==
=== Rounds and dates ===
Phase	Round	Round date
Qualification round		19–22 October 2023
Quarter-finals	First leg	25 November 2023
Quarter-finals	Second leg	9 December 2023
Semi-finals	First leg	9 March 2024
Semi-finals	Second leg	23 March 2024
Final	First leg	6 April 2024
Final	Second leg	27 April 2024

== Qualification round ==
=== Draw ===
The draw was on 11 September 2023. H indicates which club is hosting the groups. Teams in bold advanced to the quarter-finals. The seeding was decided by as follows:

- The new LEN club rankings.
- LEN country club rankings.
- LEN men's national team rankings.

Pot 1	Pot 2	Pot 3	Pot 4	Pot 5
(Portugal) Vitória Sport Clube (Turkey) **Galatasaray** **(H)** (Turkey) Enka Istanbul (Switzerland) **Carouge Natation**	(Slovenia) **Triglav Kranj** (Bosnia and Herzegovina) VK Banja Luka (Slovakia) **KVP Novaky** (Lithuania) **EVK Zaibas**	(Malta) **Valletta** **(H)** (Turkey) ODTU Sport Club; Clube Fluvial Portuense **(H)**; Sporting Clube De Portugal	(Switzerland) **SC Kreuzlingen** (Belgium) **Royal Dauphins Mouscronnois** **(H)** (Bulgaria) KVT Komodor (United Kingdom) Polytechnic Water Polo Club	(United Kingdom) City Of Manchester Water Polo Club (Finland) Cetus Espoo (Cyprus) APOEL Nicosia

=== Group A ===
Held in Porto, Portugal

Pos	Team	Pld	W	PSW	PSL	L	GF	GA	GD	Pts	Qualification	(Switzerland) KRE	(Slovenia) TRI	(Portugal) VIT	(Portugal) FLU	(Cyprus) APO
1	(Switzerland) SC Kreuzlingen	4	4	0	0	0	59	36	+23	**12**	Quarter-finals	—	10–9	—	—	—
2	(Slovenia) Triglav Kranj	4	2	0	0	2	47	34	+13	**6 (Note: Head-to-head goal difference: Triglav Kranj +1, Vitoria Sport Clube +1, Clube Fluvial Portuense –2. Head-to-head result: Triglav Kranj 10–8 Vitoria Sport Clube.)**	Quarter-finals	—	—	10–8	—	18–5
3	(Portugal) Vitória Sport Clube	4	2	0	0	2	48	45	+3	**6**		10–12	—	—	—	18–14
4	(Portugal) Clube Fluvial Portuense (H)	4	2	0	0	2	39	51	−12	**6**		8–21	11–10	9–12	—	11–8
5	(Cyprus) APOEL Nicosia	4	0	0	0	4	36	63	−27	**0**		9–16	—	—	—	—

Source: Report
(H) Host

=== Group B ===
Held in Mouscron, Belgium

Pos	Team	Pld	W	PSW	PSL	L	GF	GA	GD	Pts	Qualification	(Switzerland) CAR	(Belgium) DAU	(United Kingdom) MAN	(Turkey) ODT	(Bosnia and Herzegovina) BAN
1	(Switzerland) Carouge Natation	4	3	1	0	0	59	34	+25	**11**	Quarter-finals	—	—	11–10	20–9	20–7
2	(Belgium) Royal Dauphins Mouscronnois (H)	4	3	0	1	0	69	36	+33	**10**	Quarter-finals	11–12 (Note: Match ended 8–8, Carouge Natation won 4–3 on penalties)	—	16–14	20–7	25–7
3	(United Kingdom) City Of Manchester Water Polo Club	4	2	0	0	2	60	42	+18	**6**		—	—	—	—	—
4	(Turkey) ODTU Sport Club	4	1	0	0	3	45	69	−24	**3**		—	—	8–13	—	21–16
5	(Bosnia and Herzegovina) VK Banja Luka	4	0	0	0	4	37	89	−52	**0**		—	—	7–23	—	—

Source: Report
(H) Host

=== Group C ===
Held in Istanbul, Turkey

Pos	Team	Pld	W	PSW	PSL	L	GF	GA	GD	Pts	Qualification	(Turkey) GAL	(Slovakia) NOV	(United Kingdom) POL	(Portugal) SPO
1	(Turkey) Galatasaray (H)	3	3	0	0	0	58	21	+37	**9**	Quarter-finals	—	14–7	17–8	27–6
2	(Slovakia) KVP Novaky	3	2	0	0	1	33	28	+5	**6**	Quarter-finals	—	—	—	15–6
3	(United Kingdom) Polytechnic Water Polo Club	3	1	0	0	2	25	32	−7	**3**		—	8–11	—	—
4	Sporting Clube De Portugal	3	0	0	0	3	16	51	−35	**0**		—	—	4–9	—

Source: Report
(H) Host

=== Group D ===
Held in Valletta, Malta

Pos	Team	Pld	W	PSW	PSL	L	GF	GA	GD	Pts	Qualification	(Lithuania) ZAI	(Malta) VAL	(Turkey) ENK	(Finland) CET	(Bulgaria) KOM
1	(Lithuania) EVK Zaibas	4	3	0	0	1	64	35	+29	**9 (Note: Head-to-head goal difference: EVK Zaibas +1, Valletta 0, Enka Istanbul –1.)**	Quarter-finals	—	—	8–11	22–8	—
2	(Malta) Valletta (H)	4	3	0	0	1	67	33	+34	**9**	Quarter-finals	11–15	—	14–10	21–5	21–3
3	(Turkey) Enka Istanbul	4	3	0	0	1	68	26	+42	**9**		—	—	—	22–1	25–3
4	(Finland) Cetus Espoo	4	1	0	0	3	36	74	−38	**3**		—	—	—	—	22–9
5	(Bulgaria) KVT Komodor	4	0	0	0	4	20	87	−67	**0**		5–19	—	—	—	—

Source: Report
(H) Host

== Knockout stage ==
=== Draw ===
The draw took place on 24 October in Barcelona. The seeded and unseeded clubs consist of the teams that finished first and second in the previous round respectively. The only restriction was that clubs from the same group in the previous round could not be drawn against each other.

Seeded	Unseeded
(Switzerland) SC Kreuzlingen (Switzerland) Carouge Natation (Turkey) Galatasaray (Lithuania) EVK Zaibas	(Slovenia) Triglav Kranj (Belgium) Royal Dauphins Mouscronnois (Slovakia) KVP Novaky (Malta) Valletta

=== Bracket ===
Quarter-finals
(Belgium) Royal Dauphins Mouscronnois	7	7	14
(Lithuania) EVK Zaibas	17	18	35
(Malta) Valletta	6	12	18
(Turkey) Galatasaray	10	15	25
(Slovenia) Triglav Kranj	17	12	29
(Switzerland) Carouge Natation	7	14	21
(Slovakia) KVP Novaky	15	11	26
(Switzerland) SC Kreuzlingen	14	13	27

Semi-finals
(Lithuania) EVK Zaibas	8	9	17
(Turkey) Galatasaray	9	12	21
(Slovenia) Triglav Kranj	11	10	21
(Switzerland) SC Kreuzlingen	10	10	20

Final
(Turkey) Galatasaray	14	19	33
(Slovenia) Triglav Kranj	6	13	19

=== Quarter-finals ===
25 November 2023; 20:30	Report	Royal Dauphins Mouscronnois (Belgium)	7–17	(Lithuania) EVK Zaibas	Mouscron, Belgium; Referees: Peter Radic (SVK), Luis Santos (POR)
25 November 2023; 20:30	Report	Score by quarters: 0–6, 1–1, 2–5, 4–5			Mouscron, Belgium; Referees: Peter Radic (SVK), Luis Santos (POR)
25 November 2023; 20:30	Report	Croquet 2	Goals	Bakulo 4	Mouscron, Belgium; Referees: Peter Radic (SVK), Luis Santos (POR)

9 December 2023; 19:00	Report	EVK Zaibas (Lithuania)	18–7	(Belgium) Royal Dauphins Mouscronnois	Elektrėnai, Lithuania; Referees: Massimo Castrilli (SUI), Rok Vehovec (SLO)
9 December 2023; 19:00	Report	Score by quarters: 3–4, 5–0, 7–1, 3–2			Elektrėnai, Lithuania; Referees: Massimo Castrilli (SUI), Rok Vehovec (SLO)
9 December 2023; 19:00	Report	Bakulo, Jonkus 4	Goals	Lukacs 2	Elektrėnai, Lithuania; Referees: Massimo Castrilli (SUI), Rok Vehovec (SLO)

EVK Zaibas won 35–14 on aggregate.

25 November 2023; 19:00	Report	Valletta (Malta)	6–10	(Turkey) Galatasaray	Gzira, Malta; Referees: Alessandro Severo (ITA), Tomi Kavcic (SLO)
25 November 2023; 19:00	Report	Score by quarters: 2–2, 1–3, 2–4, 1–1			Gzira, Malta; Referees: Alessandro Severo (ITA), Tomi Kavcic (SLO)
25 November 2023; 19:00	Report	Galea, Gialanze 2	Goals	Caner 3	Gzira, Malta; Referees: Alessandro Severo (ITA), Tomi Kavcic (SLO)

9 December 2023; 17:30	Report	Galatasaray (Turkey)	15–12	(Malta) Valletta	Istanbul, Turkey; Referees: Erik Kolar (SVK), Philip Uhlig (GER)
9 December 2023; 17:30	Report	Score by quarters: 4–2, 3–2, 4–4, 4–4			Istanbul, Turkey; Referees: Erik Kolar (SVK), Philip Uhlig (GER)
9 December 2023; 17:30	Report	Caner 4	Goals	Cachia, Gialanze 3	Istanbul, Turkey; Referees: Erik Kolar (SVK), Philip Uhlig (GER)

Galatasaray won 25–18 on aggregate.

2 December 2023; 20:00	Report	Triglav Kranj (Slovenia)	17–7	(Switzerland) Carouge Natation	Kranj, Slovenia; Referees: Karel Dvoracek (CZE), Erkan Turkkan (TUR)
2 December 2023; 20:00	Report	Score by quarters: 3–1, 6–4, 2–2, 6–0			Kranj, Slovenia; Referees: Karel Dvoracek (CZE), Erkan Turkkan (TUR)
2 December 2023; 20:00	Report	Lah 4	Goals	Blary, Roscio 2	Kranj, Slovenia; Referees: Karel Dvoracek (CZE), Erkan Turkkan (TUR)

9 December 2023; 19:15	Report	Carouge Natation (Switzerland)	14–12	(Slovenia) Triglav Kranj	Carouge, Switzerland; Referees: Radosław Koryzna (POL), Boris Margeta (SLO)
9 December 2023; 19:15	Report	Score by quarters: 3–2, 3–5, 3–5, 5–0			Carouge, Switzerland; Referees: Radosław Koryzna (POL), Boris Margeta (SLO)
9 December 2023; 19:15	Report	Blary 7	Goals	Justin 4	Carouge, Switzerland; Referees: Radosław Koryzna (POL), Boris Margeta (SLO)

Triglav Kranj won 29–21 on aggregate.

25 November 2023; 19:00	Report	KVP Novaky (Slovakia)	15–14	(Switzerland) SC Kreuzlingen	Novaky, Slovakia; Referees: Massimo Angileri (MLT), Nerijus Papaurelis (LTU)
25 November 2023; 19:00	Report	Score by quarters: 2–2, 3–4, 6–2, 4–6			Novaky, Slovakia; Referees: Massimo Angileri (MLT), Nerijus Papaurelis (LTU)
25 November 2023; 19:00	Report	Mihal, Tisaj 4	Goals	Geiser, Pleyer 3	Novaky, Slovakia; Referees: Massimo Angileri (MLT), Nerijus Papaurelis (LTU)

9 December 2023; 20:00	Report	SC Kreuzlingen (Switzerland)	13–11	(Slovakia) KVP Novaky	Kreuzlingen, Switzerland
9 December 2023; 20:00	Report	Score by quarters: 2–1, 2–1, 3–4, 6–5			Kreuzlingen, Switzerland
9 December 2023; 20:00	Report	Pleyer 6	Goals	Bielik 3	Kreuzlingen, Switzerland

SC Kreuzlingen won 27–26 on aggregate.

=== Semi-finals ===
9 March 2024; 19:00	Report	EVK Zaibas (Lithuania)	8–9	(Turkey) Galatasaray	Elektrėnai, Lithuania; Referees: Rik Evers (NED), Gernot Haentschel (GER)
9 March 2024; 19:00	Report	Score by quarters: 0–3, 2–2, 5–2, 1–2			Elektrėnai, Lithuania; Referees: Rik Evers (NED), Gernot Haentschel (GER)
9 March 2024; 19:00	Report	Gostautas, Pumputis 2	Goals	Acar, Naipoglu 2	Elektrėnai, Lithuania; Referees: Rik Evers (NED), Gernot Haentschel (GER)

23 March 2024; 19:00	Report	Galatasaray (Turkey)	12–9	(Lithuania) EVK Zaibas	Istanbul, Turkey; Referees: Daniele Bianco (ITA), Tomislav Copic (CRO)
23 March 2024; 19:00	Report	Score by quarters: 4–1, 3–1, 3–5, 2–2			Istanbul, Turkey; Referees: Daniele Bianco (ITA), Tomislav Copic (CRO)
23 March 2024; 19:00	Report	Krstic 4	Goals	Jelača 5	Istanbul, Turkey; Referees: Daniele Bianco (ITA), Tomislav Copic (CRO)

Galatasaray won 21–17 on aggregate

9 March 2024; 18:00	Report	Triglav Kranj (Slovenia)	11–10	(Switzerland) SC Kreuzlingen	Kranj, Slovenia; Referees: Rajmund Fodor (HUN), Jakov Blaskovic (CRO)
9 March 2024; 18:00	Report	Score by quarters: 3–1, 2–2, 3–3, 3–4			Kranj, Slovenia; Referees: Rajmund Fodor (HUN), Jakov Blaskovic (CRO)
9 March 2024; 18:00	Report	Paunovic 3	Goals	Pleyer 3	Kranj, Slovenia; Referees: Rajmund Fodor (HUN), Jakov Blaskovic (CRO)

23 March 2024; 20:00	Report	SC Kreuzlingen (Switzerland)	10–10	(Slovenia) Triglav Kranj	Kreuzlingen, Switzerland; Referees: David Gomez (ESP), Stanko Ivanovski (MNE)
23 March 2024; 20:00	Report	Score by quarters: 3–0, 4–3, 2–3, 1–4			Kreuzlingen, Switzerland; Referees: David Gomez (ESP), Stanko Ivanovski (MNE)
23 March 2024; 20:00	Report	Herzog, Pleyer 4	Goals	Cerar, Troppan 3	Kreuzlingen, Switzerland; Referees: David Gomez (ESP), Stanko Ivanovski (MNE)

Triglav Kranj won 21–20 on aggregate

=== Final ===
6 April 2024; 18:00	Report	Galatasaray (Turkey)	14–6	(Slovenia) Triglav Kranj	Istanbul, Turkey; Referees: Rik Evers (NED), Sinisa Matijasevic (MNE)
6 April 2024; 18:00	Report	Score by quarters: 3–2, 5–2, 3–1, 3–1			Istanbul, Turkey; Referees: Rik Evers (NED), Sinisa Matijasevic (MNE)
6 April 2024; 18:00	Report	Destici 5	Goals	Justin 2	Istanbul, Turkey; Referees: Rik Evers (NED), Sinisa Matijasevic (MNE)

27 April 2024; 20:00	Report	Triglav Kranj (Slovenia)	13–19	(Turkey) Galatasaray	Kranj, Slovenia; Referees: Radoslaw Koryzna (POL), Hendrik Schopp (GER)
27 April 2024; 20:00	Report	Score by quarters: 3–5, 3–2, 3–5, 4–7			Kranj, Slovenia; Referees: Radoslaw Koryzna (POL), Hendrik Schopp (GER)
27 April 2024; 20:00	Report	Rajlic, Stromajer 3	Goals	Naipoglu 4	Kranj, Slovenia; Referees: Radoslaw Koryzna (POL), Hendrik Schopp (GER)

Galatasaray won 33–19 on aggregate

2023–24 LEN Challenger Cup Champions
(Turkey)
Galatasaray
First title

== See also ==
- 2023–24 LEN Champions League
- 2023–24 LEN Euro Cup
- 2023 LEN Super Cup
- 2023–24 LEN Women's Champions League
- 2023–24 LEN Women's Euro Cup
- 2023–24 LEN Women's Challenger Cup
- 2023 LEN Women's Super Cup
