= 2022–23 LEN Women's Champions League =

European water polo tournament

- League: LEN Women's Euro Cup
- Sport: Water Polo
- Duration: 17 November 2022 – 1 April 2023

LEN Women's Champions League seasons
- ← 2021–22 2023–24 →

The 2022–23 LEN Women's Champions League is the 35th edition of the major competition for European women's water polo clubs. It starts on 17 November 2022.

== Qualification round ==
3 teams will progressed from each group. The remaining 8 teams competed in the LEN Euro Cup for women.

=== Group A (Pacos de Ferreira, Portugal) ===
CN Mataro (ESP), Olympic Nice (FRA), Vouliagmeni NC (GRE), Pacence (POR, host team), ZVL 1886 (NED)

Pos	Team	Pts	W	D	L	GF	GA
1	(Spain) CN Mataro	12	4	0	0	92	25
2	(Greece) Vouliagmeni NC	9	3	0	1	64	30
3	(Netherlands) ZVL 1886	6	2	0	2	52	52
4	(France) Nice	3	1	0	3	33	49
5	(Portugal) Pacense	0	0	0	4	19	104

- (Netherlands) ZVL 1886 28–7 Pacense (Portugal)
- (Greece) Vouliagmeni NC 14–4 Nice (France)
- (France) Nice 5–10 ZVL 1886 (Netherlands)
- (Spain) CN Mataro 14–11 Vouliagmeni NC (Greece)
- (Portugal) Pacense 4–20 Nice (France)
- (Netherlands) ZVL 1886 5–27 CN Mataro (Spain)
- (Spain) CN Mataro 30–5 Pacense (Portugal)
- (Greece) Vouliagmeni NC 13–9 ZVL 1886 (Netherlands)
- (France) Nice 4–21 CN Mataro (Spain)
- (Portugal) Pacense 3–26 Vouliagmeni NC (Greece)

=== Group B (Glyfada, Greece) ===
NC Glyfada (GRE, host team), ZV De Zaan (NED), CN Terrassa (ESP), Grand Nancy (FRA), Tigre Eger (HUN)

Pos	Team	Pts	W	D	L	GF	GA
1	(Greece) NC Glyfada	9	3	0	1	58	35
2	(Hungary) Eger	9	3	0	1	53	40
3	(Netherlands) ZV De Zaan	7	2	1	1	51	39
4	(Spain) CN Terassa	4	1	1	2	54	39
5	(France) Grand Nancy	0	0	0	4	11	74

- (Spain) CN Terassa 11–11 ZV De Zaan (Netherlands)
- (Greece) NC Glyfada 21–4 Grand Nancy (France)
- (France) Grand Nancy 1–22 CN Terassa (Spain)
- (Hungary) Eger 15–10 ZV De Zaan (Netherlands)
- (Netherlands) ZV De Zaan 12–11 NC Glyfada (Greece)
- (Hungary) Eger 14–13 CN Terassa (Spain)
- (Greece) NC Glyfada 13–8 CN Terassa (Spain)
- (France) Grand Nancy 4–13 Eger (Hungary)
- (Netherlands) ZV De Zaan 18–2 Grand Nancy (France)
- (Greece) NC Glyfada 13–11 Eger (Hungary)

=== Group C (Barcelona, Spain) ===
Plebiscito Padova (ITA), UA Lille (FRA), Sirens ASC Malta (MLT), FTC-Telekom Budapest (HUN), CE Mediterrani Barcelona (ESP, host)

Pos	Team	Pts	W	D	L	GF	GA
1	(Italy) Plebiscito Padova	9	3	0	1	74	37
2	(Spain) CE Mediterrani	9	3	0	1	71	30
3	(Hungary) FTC-Telekom Budapest	9	3	0	1	68	32
4	(France) UA Lille	3	1	0	3	45	61
5	(Malta) Sirens ASC Malta	0	0	0	4	22	120

- (Italy) Plebiscito Padova 33–7 Sirens ASC Malta (Malta)
- (Spain) CE Mediterrani 7–9 FTC-Telekom Budapest (Hungary)
- (France) UA Lille 8–18 FTC-Telekom Budapest (Hungary)
- (Spain) CE Mediterrani 31–7 Sirens ASC Malta (Malta)
- (Hungary) FTC-Telekom Budapest 33–4 Sirens ASC Malta (Malta)
- (France) UA Lille 10–18 Plebiscito Padova (Italy)
- (Italy) Plebiscito Padova 13–8 FTC-Telekom Budapest (Hungary)
- (Spain) CE Mediterrani 21–4 UA Lille (France)
- (France) UA Lille 23–4 Sirens ASC Malta (Malta)
- (Spain) CE Mediterrani 12–10 Plebiscito Padova (Italy)

=== Group D (Mulhouse, France) ===
Dunaujvarosi Foiskola (HUN), Spandau 04 Berlin (GER), SIS Roma (ITA), Ethnikos Piraeus (GRE), Mulhouse WP (FRA, host team)

Pos	Team	Pts	W	D	L	GF	GA
1	(Italy) SIS Roma	12	4	0	0	75	29
2	(Hungary) Dunaujvarosi Foiskola	9	3	0	1	58	41
3	(Greece) Ethnikos Piraeus	6	2	0	2	53	45
4	(France) Mulhouse	3	1	0	3	44	62
5	(Germany) Spandau 04 Berlin	0	0	0	4	30	83

- (France) Mulhouse 19–12 Spandau 04 Berlin (Germany)
- (Greece) Ethnikos Piraeus 10–16 SIS Roma (Italy)
- (Greece) Ethnikos Piraeus 20–6 Spandau 04 Berlin (Germany)
- (France) Mulhouse 11–14 Dunaujvarosi Foiskola (Hungary)
- (Germany) Spandau 04 Berlin 5–23 SIS Roma (Italy)
- (Greece) Ethnikos Piraeus 8–13 Dunaujvarosi Foiskola (Hungary)
- (Hungary) Dunaujvarosi Foiskola 10–15 SIS Roma (Italy)
- (France) Mulhouse 10–15 Ethnikos Piraeus (Greece)
- (Hungary) Dunaujvarosi Foiskola 21–7 Spandau 04 Berlin (Germany)
- (France) Mulhouse 4–21 SIS Roma (Italy)

== Last 16 ==
=== Group A ===
Ekipe Orizzonte (ITA), Plebiscito Padova (ITA) (Host), Dunaujvarosi Foiskola (HUN), ZVL 1886 (NED)

Pos	Team	Pts	W	D	L	GF	GA
1	(Italy) Ekipe Orizzonte	7	2	1	0	43	21
2	(Hungary) Dunaujvarosi Foiskola	5	1	2	0	38	21
3	(Italy) Plebiscito Padova	4	1	1	1	26	24
4	(Netherlands) ZVL 1886	0	0	0	3	13	54

=== Group B ===
Astralpool Sabadell (ESP), CN Mataro (ESP), Eger (HUN) (Host), FTC Telekom Budapest (HUN)

Pos	Team	Pts	W	D	L	GF	GA
1	(Spain) CN Mataro	9	3	0	0	41	24
2	(Spain) Astralpool Sabadell	6	2	0	1	35	26
3	(Hungary) Eger	3	1	0	2	27	39
4	(Hungary) FTC Telekom Budapest	0	0	0	3	25	39

=== Group C ===
UVSE (HUN) (Host), NC Glyfada (GRE), CE Mediterrani (ESP), Ethnikos Piraeus (GRE)

Pos	Team	Pts	W	D	L	GF	GA
1	(Spain) CE Mediterrani	9	3	0	0	32	25
2	(Greece) NC Glyfada	6	2	0	1	32	26
3	(Hungary) UVSE	3	1	0	2	23	28
4	(Greece) Ethnikos Piraeus	0	0	0	3	27	35

=== Group D ===
Olympiacos Piraeus (GRE), SIS Roma (ITA) (Host), NC Vouliagmeni (GRE), ZV De Zaan (NED)

Pos	Team	Pts	W	D	L	GF	GA
1	(Italy) SIS Roma	7	2	1	0	37	24
2	(Greece) Olympiacos Piraeus	7	2	1	0	40	37
3	(Greece) NC Vouliagmeni	3	1	0	2	24	28
4	(Netherlands) ZV De Zaan	0	0	0	3	24	36

== Quarterfinals ==
Official source:

Team 1	Agg.	Team 2	1st leg	2nd leg
Olympiacos Piraeus (Greece)	21–26	(Spain) CN Mataro	9–11	12–15
Dunaujvarosi Foiskola (Hungary)	22–17	(Spain) CE Mediterrani	13–9	9–8
NC Glyfada (Greece)	22–29	(Italy) Ekipe Orizzonte	13–14	9–15
Astralpool Sabadell (Spain)	25–23	(Italy) SIS Roma	15–10	10–13

=== 1st leg (11/2/2023) ===
- (Greece) Olympiacos Piraeus 9–11 CN Mataro (Spain)
- (Spain) CE Mediterrani 9–13 Dunaujvaros (Hungary)
- (Greece) NC Glyfada 13–14 Ekipe Orizzonte (Italy)
- (Spain) Astralpool Sabadell 15–10 SIS Roma (Italy)

=== 2nd leg (25/2/2023) ===
- (Spain) CN Mataro 15–12 Olympiacos Piraeus (Greece)
- (Hungary) Dunaujvaros 9–8 CE Mediterrani (Spain)
- (Italy) Ekipe Orizzonte 15–9 NC Glyfada (Greece)
- (Italy) SIS Roma 13–10 Astralpool Sabadell (Spain)

== Semifinals ==
Official source:

Team 1	Score	Team 2
Ekipe Orizzonte (Italy)	12–13	(Spain) Astralpool Sabadell
CN Mataro (Spain)	12–9	(Hungary) Dunaujvaros

== Third place play-off ==
Official source:

Team 1	Score	Team 2
Dunaujvaros (Hungary)	8–12	(Italy) Ekipe Orizzonte

== Final ==
Official source:

Team 1	Score	Team 2
CN Mataro (Spain)	8–9	(Spain) Astralpool Sabadell
