= 2023–24 LEN Women's Champions League =

European water polo tournament

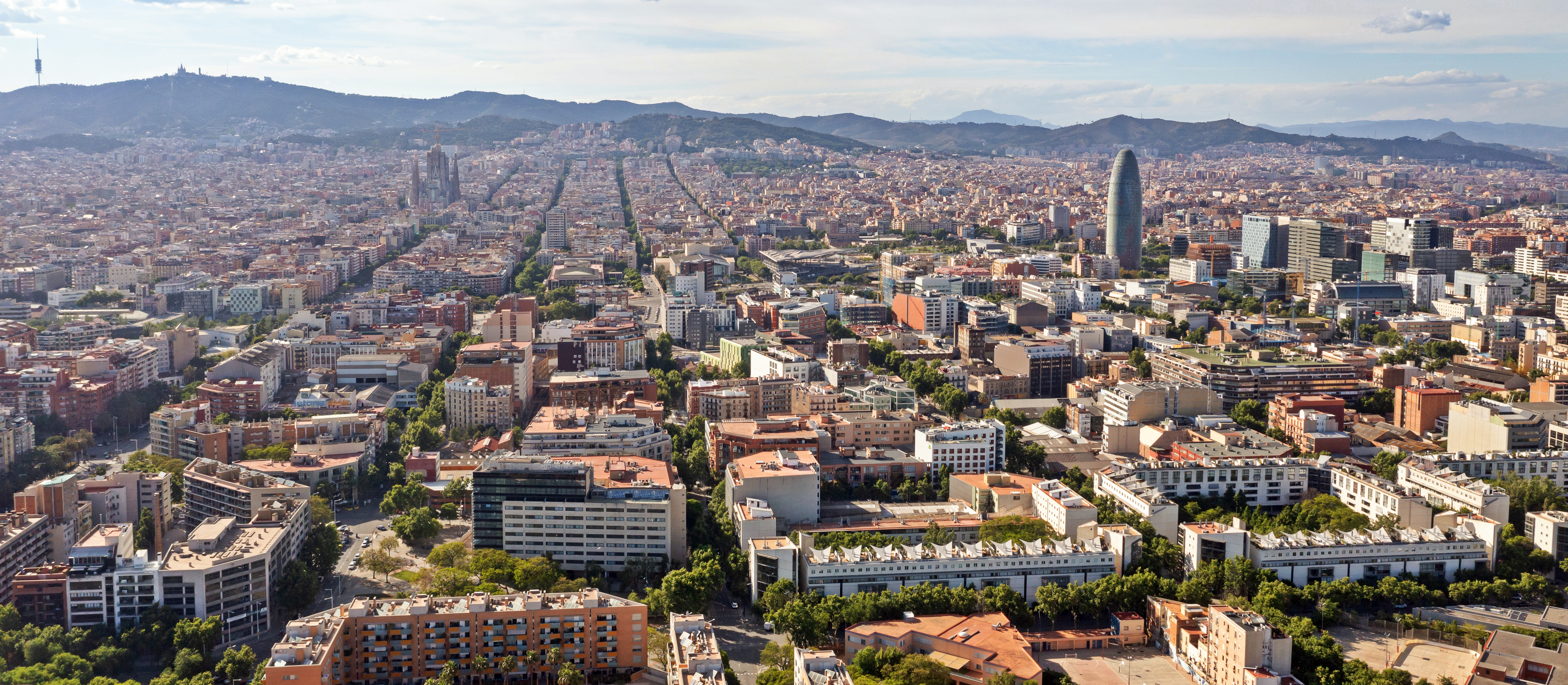
- Barcelona hosted the Final four.
- League: LEN Women's Champions League
- Sport: Water polo
- Duration: 21 September 2023 – 21 April 2024
- Games: 92
- Teams: 24 (from 7 countries)
- Finals champions: (Spain) Astralpool Sabadell (7th title)
- Runners-up: (Greece) Olympiacos Piraeus

LEN Women's Champions League seasons
- 2022–23 2024–25

The 2023–24 LEN Women's Champions League is the 36th edition of the water polo competition organised by the Ligue Européenne de Natation (LEN). This is the first season under the new changes made by LEN. The defending champions are Astralpool Sabadell.

The Spanish side successfully defended their title with a win against Olympiacos Piraeus in the final.

== Format ==
This season, the format has undergone some changes. After one qualification round (instead of two), sixteen teams will qualify for the main round. For the first time ever, the groups in the main round are held in a home and away format. After the main round, the four groups winners will compete in the final four to decide the winners of the LEN Women's Champions League.

== Rankings ==
Starting this season, LEN also started a club rankings. Countries inside the top 6 of the new LEN women's club rankings are eligible to enter 5 clubs into the Champions League. While countries outside the top 6 can enter their league champion into either the Champions League or Challenger Cup.

Rank	Association	Points	Teams
1	Spain	105,597.5	5
2	Greece	91,125	5
3	Hungary	84,842.5	5
4	Italy	76,410	4
5	France	24,127.5	3
6	Russia	53.38	0
7	Netherlands	49.300	1
8	Slovakia	5,145	0
9	Germany	4,620	1
9	Portugal	4,620	0
11	Malta	3,940	0
12	Israel	2,500	0
13	Croatia	1,012.5	0

== Teams ==
Alongside the new changes, LEN increased the number of clubs a country can enter, from 4 to 5. German representative, Spandau 04, was the only club outside the top 6 who decided to enter, starting in the qualifiers. While on the other hand, despite being in the top 6, Russia was banned and Netherlands took the sixth-place spot. All other clubs and countries below the top six entered the 2023–24 LEN Women's Challenger Cup.

Main round
(Greece) Olympiacos Piraeus (1st)	(Hungary) ZF Eger (1st)	(Italy) Ekipe Orizzonte (1st)	(Spain) Astralpool Sabadell ^{CL} (1st)

Qualification round
(France) Lille UC (1st)	(France) Mulhouse WP (2nd)	(France) Grand Nancy AC (3rd)	(Germany) Spandau 04 (1st)
(Greece) NO Vouliagmeni (2hd)	(Greece) Ethnikos Piraeus (3rd)	(Greece) ANC Glyfada (4th)	(Greece) Alimos NAC Betsson (5th)
(Hungary) Dunaújváros (2nd)	(Hungary) FTC Telekom (3rd)	(Hungary) UVSE Budapest (4th)	(Hungary) BVSC-Zugló (5th)
(Italy) SIS Roma (2nd)	(Italy) Antenore Plebiscito Padova (3rd)	(Italy) Pallanuoto Trieste (4th)	(Netherlands) ZV De Zaan (1st)
(Spain) Assolim CN Mataró (2nd)	(Spain) CN Sant Andreu (3rd)	(Spain) CE Mediterrani (4th)	(Spain) CN Terrassa (5th)

== Round and draw dates ==
=== Schedule ===
Phase	Round	Round date
Qualification round		21–24 September 2023
Main round	Matchday 1	7–8 October 2023
Main round	Matchday 2	21 October 2023
Main round	Matchday 3	4 November 2023
Main round	Matchday 4	25 November 2023
Main round	Matchday 5	9 March 2024
Main round	Matchday 6	23 March 2024
Final four	Semifinals	20 April 2024
Final four	Final	21 April 2024

== Draw ==
The draw was on 10 August 2023. The seeding was decided by the new LEN club rankings. H indicates which club is hosting the groups.

Pot 1	Pot 2	Pot 3	Pot 4	Pot 5
(Hungary) Dunaújváros (Spain) Assolim CN Mataró (H) (Hungary) UVSE Budapest (H) (Italy) Antenore Plebiscito Padova	(Greece) NO Vouliagmeni (Spain) CE Mediterrani (Italy) SIS Roma (H) (Hungary) FTC Telekom	(Greece) ANC Glyfada (Greece) Ethnikos Piraeus (Spain) CN Terrassa (France) Lille UC	(Hungary) BVSC-Zugló (Spain) CN Sant Andreu (Germany) Spandau 04 (France) Mulhouse WP (H)	(Netherlands) ZV De Zaan (France) Grand Nancy AC (Greece) Alimos NAC Betsson (Italy) Pallanuoto Trieste

== Qualification round ==
In the qualification round, teams play in a round robin format. The top 3 in every group makes the main round, while the fourth and fifth placed teams in the groups drop down to the 2023–24 LEN Women's Euro Cup group stage.

=== Group A ===
- 21–24 September 2023, Budapest, Hungary.

Pos	Team	Pld	W	PSW	PSL	L	GF	GA	GD	Pts	Qualification	(Hungary) UVSE	(Greece) ALI	(Hungary) FTC	(Greece) GLY	(Germany) SPA
1	(Hungary) UVSE Budapest (H)	4	4	0	0	0	59	34	+25	12	Main round	—	12–7	11–9	21–11	15–7
2	(Greece) Alimos NAC Betsson	4	3	0	0	1	51	43	+8	9	Main round	—	—	—	—	—
3	(Hungary) FTC Telekom	4	2	0	0	2	55	40	+15	6	Main round	—	13–14	—	17–8	16–7
4	(Greece) ANC Glyfada	4	1	0	0	3	37	63	−26	3	Euro Cup	—	9–19	—	—	9–6
5	(Germany) Spandau 04	4	0	0	0	4	29	51	−22	0	Euro Cup	—	9–11	—	—	—

Source: Report
(H) Host

=== Group B ===
- 21–24 September 2023, Mulhouse, France.

Pos	Team	Pld	W	PSW	PSL	L	GF	GA	GD	Pts	Qualification	(France) MUL	(Greece) ETH	(Spain) MED	(Italy) TRI	(Italy) PAD
1	(France) Mulhouse WP (H)	4	4	0	0	0	48	37	+11	12	Main round	—	13–10	14–12	10–9	11–6
2	(Greece) Ethnikos Piraeus	4	2	1	0	1	44	42	+2	8	Main round	—	—	17–15 (Note: Match ended 13–13, Ethnikos Piraeus won 4–2 on penalties)	12–9	9–7
3	(Spain) CE Mediterrani	4	1	0	2	1	55	50	+5	5	Main round	—	—	—	17–10	15–17 (Note: Match ended 13–13, Antenore Plebiscito Padova won 4–2 on penalties)
4	(Italy) Pallanuoto Trieste	4	1	0	0	3	42	51	−9	3	Euro Cup	—	—	—	—	—
5	(Italy) Antenore Plebiscito Padova	4	0	1	0	3	38	47	−9	2	Euro Cup	—	—	—	12–14	—

Source: Report
(H) Host

=== Group C ===
- 21–24 September 2023, Mataró, Spain.

Pos	Team	Pld	W	PSW	PSL	L	GF	GA	GD	Pts	Qualification	(Spain) MAT	(Greece) VOU	(Spain) TER	(Hungary) BVSC	(Netherlands) ZAAN
1	(Spain) Assolim CN Mataró (H)	4	4	0	0	0	68	36	+32	12	Main round	—	15–9	20–7	18–9	15–11
2	(Greece) NO Vouliagmeni	4	3	0	0	1	46	37	+9	9	Main round	—	—	11–6	12–8	14–8
3	(Spain) CN Terrassa	4	2	0	0	2	42	57	−15	6	Main round	—	—	—	—	16–15
4	(Hungary) BVSC-Zugló	4	0	1	0	3	39	54	−15	2	Euro Cup	—	—	11–13	—	16–14 (Note: Match ended 11–11, BVSC-Zugló won 5–3 on penalties)
5	(Netherlands) ZV De Zaan	4	0	0	1	3	45	56	−11	1	Euro Cup	—	—	—	—	—

Source: Report
(H) Host

=== Group D ===
- 21–24 September 2023, Rome, Italy.

Pos	Team	Pld	W	PSW	PSL	L	GF	GA	GD	Pts	Qualification	(Spain) SAN	(Italy) ROM	(Hungary) DUN	(France) LIL	(France) NAN
1	(Spain) CN Sant Andreu	4	4	0	0	0	62	32	+30	12	Main round	—	—	—	—	22–3
2	(Italy) SIS Roma (H)	4	3	0	0	1	48	36	+12	9	Main round	9–15	—	9–8	9–8	21–5
3	(Hungary) Dunaújváros	4	1	1	0	2	51	36	+15	5	Main round	9–11	—	—	—	24–6
4	(France) Lille UC	4	1	0	1	2	50	42	+8	4	Euro Cup	11–14	—	10–13 (Note: Match ended 10–10, Dunaújváros won 3–0 on penalties)	—	—
5	(France) Grand Nancy AC	4	0	0	0	4	23	88	−65	0	Euro Cup	—	—	—	9–21	—

Source: Report
(H) Host

== Main round ==
Location of teams of the 2023–24 LEN Women's Champions League group stage.
Red: Group A; Blue: Group B; Yellow: Group C; Green: Group D.

The draw took place on 26 September 2023 in Barcelona, Spain. The four group winners advance to the final four.

Teams are ranked according to points (3 points for a win, 2 points for a penalty shootout win, 1 point for a penalty shootout loss, 0 points for a loss), and if tied on points, the following tiebreaking criteria are applied, in the order given, to determine the rankings:

- Points in head-to-head matches among tied teams;
- Goal difference in head-to-head matches among tied teams;
- Goals scored in head-to-head matches among tied teams;
- Goal difference in all group matches;
- Goals scored in all group matches.

This is the first time that this round is being held in a home and away format. Five countries are being represented, with Spain boasting the most clubs with five.

Location of Catalonia teams of the 2023–24 LEN Women's Champions League Main Round.
Red: Group A; Blue: Group B;
Yellow: Group C; Green: Group D.

Seeding

Pot 1	Pot 2	Pot 3	Pot 4
(Spain) Astralpool Sabadell (Greece) Olympiacos Piraeus (Italy) Ekipe Orizzonte (Hungary) ZF Eger	(Hungary) UVSE Budapest (France) Mulhouse WP (Spain) Assolim CN Mataró (Spain) CN Sant Andreu	(Greece) Alimos NAC Betsson (Greece) Ethnikos Piraeus (Greece) NO Vouliagmeni (Italy) SIS Roma	(Hungary) FTC Telekom (Spain) CE Mediterrani (Spain) CN Terrassa (Hungary) Dunaújváros

=== Group A ===
Pos	Team	Pld	W	PSW	PSL	L	GF	GA	GD	Pts	Qualification	(Spain) SAN	(Spain) TER	(Italy) ORI	(Italy) ROM
1	(Spain) CN Sant Andreu	6	5	1	0	0	75	57	+18	17	Final four	—	15–9	13–9	10–9
2	(Spain) CN Terrassa	6	3	0	0	3	59	67	−8	9		6–11	—	10–8	13–10
3	(Italy) Ekipe Orizzonte	6	2	0	0	4	68	65	+3	6		10–11	15–9	—	16–11
4	(Italy) SIS Roma	6	1	0	1	4	63	76	−13	4		14–15 (Note: Match ended 10–10, CN Sant Andreu won 5–4 on penalties)	8–12	11–10	—

Source: Report

=== Group B ===
Pos	Team	Pld	W	PSW	PSL	L	GF	GA	GD	Pts	Qualification	(Spain) SAB	(Greece) ALI	(France) MUL	(Hungary) DUN
1	(Spain) Astralpool Sabadell	6	6	0	0	0	91	55	+36	18	Final four	—	14–7	18–10	18–12
2	(Greece) Alimos NAC Betsson	6	3	0	0	3	69	76	−7	9		8–13	—	12–15	14–10
3	(France) Mulhouse WP	6	1	1	0	4	77	94	−17	5		10–19	13–16	—	18–16 (Note: Match ended 15–15, Mulhouse WP won 3–1 on penalties)
4	(Hungary) Dunaújváros	6	1	0	1	4	70	82	−12	4		8–9	11–12	13–11	—

Source: Report

=== Group C ===
Pos	Team	Pld	W	PSW	PSL	L	GF	GA	GD	Pts	Qualification	(Spain) MAT	(Greece) ETH	(Hungary) FTC	(Hungary) EGER
1	(Spain) Assolim CN Mataró	6	6	0	0	0	93	36	+57	18	Final four	—	18–8	13–5	18–6
2	(Greece) Ethnikos Piraeus	6	2	0	1	3	67	83	−16	7		4–13	—	15–13	14–11
3	(Hungary) FTC Telekom	6	2	0	0	4	64	68	−4	6		8–13	12–11	—	18–7
4	(Hungary) ZF Eger	6	1	1	0	4	54	91	−37	5		5–18	16–15 (Note: Match ended 11–11, ZF Eger won 5–4 on penalties)	9–8	—

Source: Report

=== Group D ===
Pos	Team	Pld	W	PSW	PSL	L	GF	GA	GD	Pts	Qualification	(Greece) OLY	(Greece) VOU	(Hungary) UVSE	(Spain) MED
1	(Greece) Olympiacos Piraeus	6	6	0	0	0	84	47	+37	18	Final four	—	12–7	15–8	21–7
2	(Greece) NO Vouliagmeni	6	3	0	0	3	62	65	−3	9 (Note: NO Vouliagmeni 21–20 UVSE Budapest)		9–14	—	13–11	14–9
3	(Hungary) UVSE Budapest	6	3	0	0	3	62	62	0	9		6–7	9–8	—	10–7
4	(Spain) CE Mediterrani	6	0	0	0	6	55	89	−34	0		10–15	10–11	12–18	—

Source: Report

== Final four ==
The Final four was held between 20 and 21 April 2024. The draw was held in Barcelona on 26 March 2024. On 12 April, the Nova Escullera pool in Barcelona was announced as the host.

=== Bracket ===
Semi-finals
20 April
(Spain) CN Sant Andreu	9
(Spain) Astralpool Sabadell	14
20 April
(Greece) Olympiacos Piraeus	16
(Spain) Assolim CN Mataró	12

Final
21 April
(Spain) Astralpool Sabadell	16
(Greece) Olympiacos Piraeus	10
Third place
21 April
(Spain) CN Sant Andreu	8
(Spain) Assolim CN Mataró	7

=== Semi-finals ===
20 April 2024; 12:00	Report	CN Sant Andreu (Spain)	9–14	(Spain) Astralpool Sabadell	Nova Escullera pool, Barcelona; Referees: Alessia Ferrari (ITA), Michiel Zwart (NED)
20 April 2024; 12:00	Report	Score by quarters: 2–2, 3–6, 3–2, 1–4			Nova Escullera pool, Barcelona; Referees: Alessia Ferrari (ITA), Michiel Zwart (NED)
20 April 2024; 12:00	Report	Pérez, Ruiz 3	Goals	González 5	Nova Escullera pool, Barcelona; Referees: Alessia Ferrari (ITA), Michiel Zwart (NED)

20 April 2024; 14:00	Report	Olympiacos Piraeus (Greece)	16–12	(Spain) Assolim CN Mataró	Nova Escullera pool, Barcelona; Referees: Nora Debreceni (HUN), Boris Margeta (SLO)
20 April 2024; 14:00	Report	Score by quarters: 2–2, 3–4, 6–2, 5–4			Nova Escullera pool, Barcelona; Referees: Nora Debreceni (HUN), Boris Margeta (SLO)
20 April 2024; 14:00	Report	Elefteriadou 7	Goals	Van de Kraats 3	Nova Escullera pool, Barcelona; Referees: Nora Debreceni (HUN), Boris Margeta (SLO)

=== Third place match ===
21 April 2024; 12:00	Report	CN Sant Andreu (Spain)	8–7	(Spain) Assolim CN Mataró	Nova Escullera pool, Barcelona; Referees: Alessia Ferrari (ITA), Michiel Zwart (NED)
21 April 2024; 12:00	Report	Score by quarters: 1–2, 4–1, 1–2, 2–2			Nova Escullera pool, Barcelona; Referees: Alessia Ferrari (ITA), Michiel Zwart (NED)
21 April 2024; 12:00	Report	Ruiz 3	Goals	Kestzthelyi 3	Nova Escullera pool, Barcelona; Referees: Alessia Ferrari (ITA), Michiel Zwart (NED)

=== Final ===
21 April 2024; 14:00	Report	Astralpool Sabadell (Spain)	16–10	(Greece) Olympiacos Piraeus	Nova Escullera pool, Barcelona; Referees: Alessia Ferrari (ITA), Boris Margeta (SLO)
21 April 2024; 14:00	Report	Score by quarters: 2–1, 5–3, 6–3, 3–3			Nova Escullera pool, Barcelona; Referees: Alessia Ferrari (ITA), Boris Margeta (SLO)
21 April 2024; 14:00	Report	Giustini 5	Goals	Plevritou 3	Nova Escullera pool, Barcelona; Referees: Alessia Ferrari (ITA), Boris Margeta (SLO)

2023–24 LEN Women's Champions League Champions

Astralpool Sabadell
Seventh title

== See also ==
- 2023–24 LEN Champions League
- 2023–24 LEN Euro Cup
- 2023–24 LEN Challenger Cup
- 2023 LEN Super Cup
- 2023–24 LEN Women's Euro Cup
- 2023–24 LEN Women's Challenger Cup
- 2023 LEN Women's Super Cup
