= Romain Blary =

French water polo player (born 1985)

Personal information
- Born: 20 October 1985 (age 41) Ruffec, Charente, France
- Height: 195 cm (6 ft 5 in)
- Weight: 103 kg (227 lb)

Sport
- Country: France
- Sport: Water polo
- Club: Strasbourg

Romain Blary (born 20 October 1985 in Ruffec, Charente) is a water polo player from France. He was part of the French team at the 2016 Summer Olympics, where the team was eliminated in the group stage.

Despite having announced his retirement in 2020, he is still participating in water polo competitions as of 2023.
