= 2023 LEN Women's Super Cup =

Water polo match

Tournament details
- Arena: Alfréd Hajós National Swimming Stadium; Budapest, Hungary
- Dates: 7 November 2023

Final positions
- Champions: (Spain) Astralpool Sabadell (4th title)
- Runners-up: (Hungary) UVSE Budapest

Awards and statistics
- Top scorer(s): Three players (3 goals each)
- Attendance: 500

The 2023 LEN Women's Super Cup was the 17th edition of the annual trophy organised by LEN and contested by the reigning champions of the two European competitions for women's water polo clubs. The match was between European champions Astralpool Sabadell of Spain (winners of the 2022–23 Women's Champions League) and UVSE Budapest of Hungary (winners of the 2022–23 LEN Women's Euro Cup). The match was held on 7 November 2023. Astralpool Sabadell won a record fourth title, winning the final 14–11.

== Teams ==
Team	Qualification	Previous participation (bold indicates winners)
(Spain) Astralpool Sabadell	Winners of the 2022–23 LEN Women's Champions League	2011, **2013**, **2014**, **2016**, 2019
(Hungary) UVSE Budapest	Winners of the 2022–23 LEN Women's Euro Cup	2017

== Venue ==
The venue is the Alfréd Hajós National Swimming Stadium in Budapest.

Alfréd Hajós Stadium
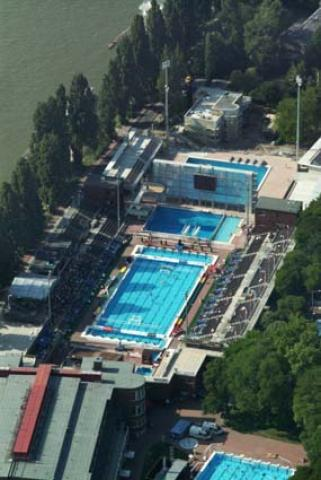

== Final ==
7 November; 18:45	Report	**Astralpool Sabadell** (Spain)	**14**–11	(Hungary) UVSE Budapest	Alfréd Hajós National Swimming Stadium, Budapest; Attendance: 500; Referees: Alessia Ferrari (ITA), Maria Daskalopoulou (GRE)
7 November; 18:45	Report	Score by quarters: **5**–3, 4–4, **3**–2, 2–2			Alfréd Hajós National Swimming Stadium, Budapest; Attendance: 500; Referees: Alessia Ferrari (ITA), Maria Daskalopoulou (GRE)
7 November; 18:45	Report	Forca 3	**Goals**	Panna, Panna 3	Alfréd Hajós National Swimming Stadium, Budapest; Attendance: 500; Referees: Alessia Ferrari (ITA), Maria Daskalopoulou (GRE)

2023 European Aquatics Women's Super Cup Champions

**Astralpool Sabadell**
Fourth title

== See also ==
- 2023–24 LEN Champions League
- 2023–24 LEN Euro Cup
- 2023–24 LEN Challenger Cup
- 2023 LEN Super Cup
- 2023–24 LEN Women's Champions League
- 2023–24 LEN Women's Euro Cup
- 2023–24 LEN Women's Challenger Cup
