= 2023–24 LEN Women's Euro Cup =

Water polo competition

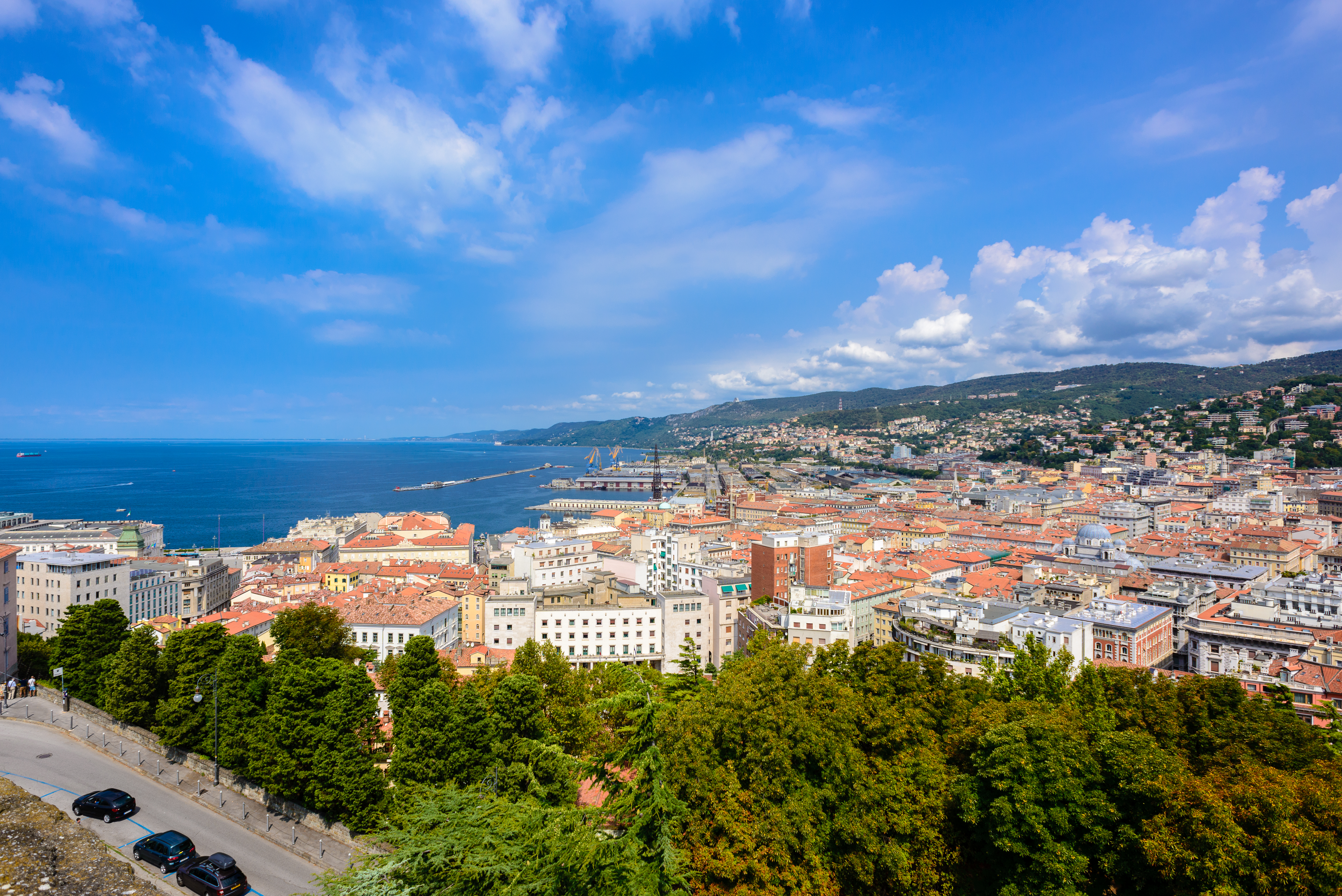
- Trieste hosted the final four.
- League: LEN Women's Euro Cup
- Sport: Water polo
- Duration: 7 October 2023 – 14 April 2024
- Games: 28
- Teams: 8 (from 6 countries)
- Finals champions: (Italy) Antenore Plebiscito Padova (1st title)
- Runners-up: (Italy) Pallanuoto Trieste

LEN Women's Euro Cup seasons
- 2022–23 2024–25

The 2023–24 LEN Women's Euro Cup is the 25th edition of the water polo competition organised by the Ligue Européenne de Natation (LEN). This is the first season under the new changes made by LEN. UVSE Budapest are the reigning champions, but won't defend their title due to their involvement in this season's Champions League.

Antenore Plebiscito Padova won an all-Italian final against Pallanuoto Trieste to secure the Euro Cup title for the first time.

== Format ==
The eight teams that failed to make the Women's Champions League group stage go into two groups of four. For the first time ever, the groups are held in a home and away format. The top two in each group qualify for the final four, which returns after a two edition absence, to decide the winners of the LEN Women's Euro Cup.

== Rankings ==
Starting this season, LEN also started a club rankings. Countries inside the top 6 of the new LEN women's club rankings are eligible to enter teams 5 clubs into the Champions League and Euro Cup. While countries outside the top 6 can enter their league champion into either the Champions League or Challenger Cup.

| Rank | Association | Points | Teams |
|---|---|---|---|
| 1 | Spain | 105,597.5 | 0 |
| 2 | Greece | 91,125 | 1 |
| 3 | Hungary | 84,842.5 | 1 |
| 4 | Italy | 76,410 | 2 |
| 5 | France | 24,127.5 | 2 |
| 6 | Russia | 53.38 | 0 |
| 7 | Netherlands | 49.300 | 1 |
| 8 | Slovakia | 5,145 | 0 |
| 9 | Germany | 4,620 | 1 |
| 9 | Portugal | 4,620 | 0 |
| 11 | Malta | 3,940 | 0 |
| 12 | Israel | 2,500 | 0 |
| 13 | Croatia | 1,012.5 | 0 |

== Teams ==
Teams that failed to make the main round of the Champions League participate in this tournament.

Teams
| (France) Lille UC (4th) | (Greece) ANC Glyfada (4th) | (Hungary) BVSC-Zugló (4th) | (Italy) Pallanuoto Trieste (4th) |
| (France) Grand Nancy AC (5th) | (Germany) Spandau 04 (5th) | (Italy) Antenore Plebiscito Padova (5th) | (Netherlands) ZV De Zaan (5th) |

== Round and draw dates ==
=== Schedule ===
| Phase | Round | Round date |
|---|---|---|
| Main round | Matchday 1 | 7 October 2023 |
| Main round | Matchday 2 | 21 October 2023 |
| Main round | Matchday 3 | 4 November 2023 |
| Main round | Matchday 4 | 25 November 2023 |
| Main round | Matchday 5 | 9 March 2024 |
| Main round | Matchday 6 | 23 March 2024 |
| Final four | Semifinals | 13 April 2024 |
| Final four | Final | 14 April 2024 |

== Draw ==
The draw was held on 26 September 2023 in Barcelona, Spain. Pot 1 and 2 consist of the teams that finished fourth and fifth in the Champions League Qualification round respectively.

| Pot 1 | Pot 2 |
|---|---|
| (Greece) ANC Glyfada (Italy) Pallanuoto Trieste (Hungary) BVSC-Zugló (France) Lille UC | (Germany) Spandau 04 (Italy) Antenore Plebiscito Padova (Netherlands) ZV De Zaan (France) Grand Nancy AC |

== Group stage ==
Location of teams of the 2023–24 LEN Women's Euro Cup group stage.
Red: Group A; Green: Group B.

The top two from each group advance to the final four.

Teams are ranked according to points (3 points for a win, 2 points for a penalty shootout win, 1 point for a penalty shootout loss, 0 points for a loss), and if tied on points, the following tiebreaking criteria are applied, in the order given, to determine the rankings:

- Points in head-to-head matches among tied teams;
- Goal difference in head-to-head matches among tied teams;
- Goals scored in head-to-head matches among tied teams;
- Goal difference in all group matches;
- Goals scored in all group matches.

=== Group A ===
| Pos | Team | Pld | W | PSW | PSL | L | GF | GA | GD | Pts | Qualification | (Italy) PAD | (Netherlands) ZAAN | (France) LIL | (Greece) GLY |
|---|---|---|---|---|---|---|---|---|---|---|---|---|---|---|---|
| 1 | (Italy) Antenore Plebiscito Padova | 6 | 5 | 0 | 0 | 1 | 63 | 51 | +12 | 15 | Final four | — | 13–12 | 14–4 | 8–7 |
| 2 | (Netherlands) ZV De Zaan | 6 | 4 | 0 | 0 | 2 | 66 | 58 | +8 | 12 | Final four | 9–10 | — | 12–9 | 14–10 |
| 3 | (France) Lille UC | 6 | 3 | 0 | 0 | 3 | 57 | 65 | −8 | 9 | | 10–7 | 8–10 | — | 9–8 |
| 4 | (Greece) ANC Glyfada | 6 | 0 | 0 | 0 | 6 | 56 | 68 | −12 | 0 | | 9–11 | 8–9 | 14–17 | — |

Source: Report

=== Group B ===
| Pos | Team | Pld | W | PSW | PSL | L | GF | GA | GD | Pts | Qualification | (Italy) TRI | (Hungary) ZUG | (Germany) SPA | (France) NAN |
|---|---|---|---|---|---|---|---|---|---|---|---|---|---|---|---|
| 1 | (Italy) Pallanuoto Trieste | 6 | 6 | 0 | 0 | 0 | 89 | 48 | +41 | 18 | Final four | — | 14–10 | 9–8 | 21–6 |
| 2 | (Hungary) BVSC-Zugló | 6 | 3 | 0 | 0 | 3 | 88 | 55 | +33 | 9 (Note: BVSC-Zugló 28–20 Spandau 04) | Final four | 8–15 | — | 14–5 | 24–2 |
| 3 | (Germany) Spandau 04 | 6 | 3 | 0 | 0 | 3 | 61 | 59 | +2 | 9 | | 8–11 | 15–14 | — | 14–4 |
| 4 | (France) Grand Nancy AC | 6 | 0 | 0 | 0 | 6 | 31 | 107 | −76 | 0 | | 8–19 | 4–18 | 7–11 | — |

Source: Report

== Final four ==
On 3 April 2024, the hosting rights were given to Pallanuoto Trieste and the event was held at the Bruno Bianchi Swimming Center in Trieste. Tickets are free for the final four.

=== Bracket ===
Semi-finals
13 April
(Italy) Antenore Plebiscito Padova | 15
(Hungary) BVSC-Zugló | 10
13 April
(Italy) Pallanuoto Trieste | 10
(Netherlands) ZV De Zaan | 8

Final
14 April
(Italy) Antenore Plebiscito Padova | 10
(Italy) Pallanuoto Trieste | 8
Third place
14 April
(Hungary) BVSC-Zugló | 8
(Netherlands) ZV De Zaan | 15

=== Semi-finals ===
| 13 April 2024; 17:30 | Report | Pallanuoto Trieste (Italy) | 10–8 | (Netherlands) ZV De Zaan | Bruno Bianchi Swimming Center, Trieste; Attendance: 700; Referees: Maria Daskalopoulou (GRE), Ilkin Cakmakoglu (TUR) |
| 13 April 2024; 17:30 | Report | Score by quarters: 1–2, 2–3, 2–3, 5–0 | | | Bruno Bianchi Swimming Center, Trieste; Attendance: 700; Referees: Maria Daskalopoulou (GRE), Ilkin Cakmakoglu (TUR) |
| 13 April 2024; 17:30 | Report | Gragnolati 5 | Goals | Drewes, Rogge 2 | Bruno Bianchi Swimming Center, Trieste; Attendance: 700; Referees: Maria Daskalopoulou (GRE), Ilkin Cakmakoglu (TUR) |

| 13 April 2024; 19:30 | Report | Antenore Plebiscito Padova (Italy) | 15–10 | (Hungary) BVSC-Zugló | Bruno Bianchi Swimming Center, Trieste; Referees: Hendrik Schopp (GER), Sara Kontek (CRO) |
| 13 April 2024; 19:30 | Report | Score by quarters: 3–2, 4–1, 5–4, 3–3 | | | Bruno Bianchi Swimming Center, Trieste; Referees: Hendrik Schopp (GER), Sara Kontek (CRO) |
| 13 April 2024; 19:30 | Report | Schaap 8 | Goals | Jancso, Meszaros-Farkas 3 | Bruno Bianchi Swimming Center, Trieste; Referees: Hendrik Schopp (GER), Sara Kontek (CRO) |

=== Third place match ===
| 14 April 2024; 15:30 | Report | ZV De Zaan (Netherlands) | 15–8 | (Hungary) BVSC-Zugló | Bruno Bianchi Swimming Center, Trieste; Referees: Sara Kontek (CRO), Maria Daskalopoulou (GRE) |
| 14 April 2024; 15:30 | Report | Score by quarters: 5–3, 4–1, 4–2, 2–2 | | | Bruno Bianchi Swimming Center, Trieste; Referees: Sara Kontek (CRO), Maria Daskalopoulou (GRE) |
| 14 April 2024; 15:30 | Report | Koopman 3 | Goals | Fekete 3 | Bruno Bianchi Swimming Center, Trieste; Referees: Sara Kontek (CRO), Maria Daskalopoulou (GRE) |

=== Final ===
| 14 April 2024; 17:30 | Report | Pallanuoto Trieste (Italy) | 8–10 | (Italy) Antenore Plebiscito Padova | Bruno Bianchi Swimming Center, Trieste; Referees: Ursula Wengenroth (SUI), Ilkin Cakmakoglu (TUR) |
| 14 April 2024; 17:30 | Report | Score by quarters: 2–2, 2–2, 1–4, 3–2 | | | Bruno Bianchi Swimming Center, Trieste; Referees: Ursula Wengenroth (SUI), Ilkin Cakmakoglu (TUR) |
| 14 April 2024; 17:30 | Report | Gragnolati 3 | Goals | Yaacobi 3 | Bruno Bianchi Swimming Center, Trieste; Referees: Ursula Wengenroth (SUI), Ilkin Cakmakoglu (TUR) |

2023–24 LEN Women's Euro Cup Champions

Antenore Plebiscito Padova
First title

== See also ==
- 2023–24 LEN Champions League
- 2023–24 LEN Euro Cup
- 2023–24 LEN Challenger Cup
- 2023 LEN Super Cup
- 2023–24 LEN Women's Champions League
- 2023–24 LEN Women's Challenger Cup
- 2023 LEN Women's Super Cup
