= 2023–24 LEN Champions League =

Water polo sports season

- League: LEN Champions League
- Sport: Water polo
- Duration: 7 September 2023 – 7 June 2024
- Season MVP: (Serbia) Dušan Mandić (FTC-Telekom)
- Top scorer: (Spain) Álvaro Granados 39 goals (Novi Beograd)
- Finals champions: (Hungary) FTC-Telekom (2nd title)
- Runners-up: (Italy) Pro Recco
- Finals MVP: (Serbia) Dušan Mandić (FTC-Telekom)

Champions League seasons
- ← 2022–23 2024–25 →

The 2023–24 LEN Champions League is the 61st edition of LEN's premier competition for men's water polo clubs. Because of the congested schedule, there's a new format this year. Pro Recco are the three-time defending champions.

FTC-Telekom won their second title after triumphing over Pro Recco in the final.

== Format ==
This season, the format has undergone some changes. After one qualification round (instead of three), sixteen teams will qualify for the group stage. Because of the congested schedule, four groups of four will be played instead of two groups of eight. The top two in each group will make the quarter-finals round (also a group stage). The team that finish third and fourth will compete in the 2023–24 LEN Euro Cup knockout stage. The remaining eight teams in the quarter-finals round will play a further six matches, with the top two in each group making the Final Four, which makes a return.

== Rankings ==
Starting this season, LEN also started a club rankings. The top 11 best ranked countries in the new rankings are allowed to have their national champion go directly into the main round, as long as they meet requirements.

Rank	Association	Points	Teams
1	Italy	118,765	3
2	Hungary	91,047.5	3
3	Spain	75,387.5	3
4	Serbia	68,902.5	3
5	Greece	64,375	3
6	Croatia	56,065	3
7	France	47,207.5	3
8	Germany	41,660	3
9	Romania	19,800	3
10	Montenegro	17,700	2
11	(Georgia (country)) Georgia	11,245	1
12	Russia	10,490	0
13	Netherlands	5,005	0

Rank	Association	Points	Teams
14	Turkey	4,807.5	0
15	Slovakia	1,870	0
16	Bosnia and Herzegovina	1,415	0
17	Portugal	1,385	0
18	Switzerland	1,210	0
19	Slovenia	1,160	0
20	Israel	860	0
21	Poland	635	0
22	Denmark	560	0
23	Lithuania	515	0
24	Malta	435	0
24	Ukraine	435	0

== Teams ==
Alongside the 11 domestic champions, the defending champions also get a spot in the main round. In the event that the Champions League defending champions won their national league, the runners-up of the national league will take the vacant spot. Although, the Italian runners-up, AN Brescia, declined the spot because they didn't want to pay the wildcard fee (which was 25,000 Euros), their spot went to the Spanish runners-up, Astrapool Sabadell).

Main round
(Croatia) Jadran Split (1st)	(France) CN Marseille (1st)	(Georgia (country)) Dinamo Tbilisi (1st)	(Germany) Spandau 04 (1st)
(Greece) Olympiacos Piraeus (1st)	(Hungary) FTC-Telekom (1st)	(Italy) Pro Recco ^{CL} (1st)	(Montenegro) Jadran Herceg Novi (1st)
(Romania) Steaua București (1st)	(Serbia) Novi Beograd (1st)	(Spain) Zodiac Atlètic-Barceloneta (1st)	(Spain) Astrapool Sabadell (2nd)

Qualification round
(Croatia) Jug AO Dubrovnik (2nd)	(Croatia) Primorje Erste Bank Rijeka (3rd)	(France) CN Noisy-le-Sec (2nd)	(France) EN Tourcoing (3rd)
(Germany) Waspo'98 Hannover (2nd)	(Germany) ASC Duisburg (3rd)	(Greece) NC Vouliagmeni (2nd)	(Greece) GS Apollon Smyrnis (3rd)
(Hungary) OSC Budapest (2nd)	(Hungary) Endo Plus Service Honvéd (3rd)	(Italy) AN Brescia (2nd)	(Italy) CC Ortigia (3rd)
(Montenegro) Primorac Kotor (2nd)	(Romania) CSM Oradea (2nd)	(Romania) Dinamo București (3rd)	(Serbia) Crvena zvezda (2nd)
(Serbia) Radnički Kragujevac (3rd)	(Spain) CN Barcelona (3rd)		

== Round and draw dates ==
=== Schedule ===
Phase	Round	Round date
Qualification round		7–10 September 2023
Main round	Matchday 1	26–27 September 2023
Main round	Matchday 2	6–7 October 2023
Main round	Matchday 3	17–18 October 2023
Main round	Matchday 4	31 October/1 November 2023
Main round	Matchday 5	21–22 November 2023
Main round	Matchday 6	5–6 December 2023
Quarter-finals round	Matchday 1	8–9 March 2024
Quarter-finals round	Matchday 2	19–20 March 2024
Quarter-finals round	Matchday 3	2–3 April 2024
Quarter-finals round	Matchday 4	23–24 April 2024
Quarter-finals round	Matchday 5	3–4 May 2024
Quarter-finals round	Matchday 6	14–15 May 2024
Final Four	Semifinals	5 June 2024
Final Four	Final	7 June 2024

== Qualification round ==
The group winners qualify for the main round, while everyone else drops down to the Euro Cup qualifiers.

=== Draw ===
The draw was on 10 August 2023. The seeding was decided by the new LEN club rankings. H indicates which club is hosting the groups. Teams in bold advanced to the main round.

Pot 1	Pot 2	Pot 3	Pot 4
(Italy) **AN Brescia** (Croatia) **Jug AO Dubrovnik** **(H)** (Germany) Waspo'98 Hannover **(H)** (Greece) **NC Vouliagmeni**	(Hungary) OSC Budapest (Italy) CC Ortigia (Serbia) Radnički Kragujevac **(H)** (Spain) CN Barcelona	(Serbia) **Crvena zvezda** (Montenegro) Primorac Kotor (France) EN Tourcoing (Romania) CSM Oradea **(H)**	(France) CN Noisy-le-Sec (Greece) GS Apollon Smyrnis (Hungary) Endo Plus Service Honvéd (Germany) ASC Duisburg (Croatia) Primorje Erste Bank Rijeka (Romania) Dinamo București

=== Group A ===
7–10 September 2023, Hannover, Germany

Pos	Team	Pld	W	PSW	PSL	L	GF	GA	GD	Pts	Qualification	(Serbia) CRV	(Spain) BAR	(Germany) HAN	(Greece) APO	(Hungary) HON
1	(Serbia) Crvena zvezda	4	4	0	0	0	50	32	+18	**12**	Main round	—	—	—	12–10	—
2	(Spain) CN Barcelona	4	3	0	0	1	41	42	−1	**9**		9–14	—	—	12–11	9–8
3	(Germany) Waspo'98 Hannover (H)	4	2	0	0	2	39	47	−8	**6**		6–14	9–11	—	11–10	13–12
4	(Greece) GS Apollon Smyrnis	4	1	0	0	3	42	45	−3	**3**		—	—	—	—	11–10
5	(Hungary) Endo Plus Service Honvéd	4	0	0	0	4	37	43	−6	**0**		7–10	—	—	—	—

Source: LEN
(H) Host

=== Group B ===
7–10 September 2023, Kragujevac, Serbia

Pos	Team	Pld	W	PSW	PSL	L	GF	GA	GD	Pts	Qualification	(Italy) BRE	(Serbia) RAD	(France) NOI	(Montenegro) KOT	(Germany) DUI
1	(Italy) AN Brescia	4	4	0	0	0	47	24	+23	**12**	Main round	—	—	—	11–3	11–4
2	(Serbia) Radnički Kragujevac (H)	4	2	1	0	1	46	45	+1	**8**		8–15	—	13–10	17–16 (Note: Match ended 12–12, Radnički Kragujevac won 5–4 on penalties)	—
3	(France) CN Noisy-le-Sec	4	2	0	0	2	52	41	+11	**6**		9–10	—	—	—	—
4	(Montenegro) Primorac Kotor	4	1	0	1	2	41	49	−8	**4**		—	—	10–16	—	16–10
5	(Germany) ASC Duisburg	4	0	0	0	4	30	57	−27	**0**		—	8–13	8–17	—	—

Source: LEN
(H) Host

=== Group C ===
8–10 September 2023, Oradea, Romania

Pos	Team	Pld	W	PSW	PSL	L	GF	GA	GD	Pts	Qualification	(Greece) VOU	(Italy) ORT	(Croatia) RIJ	(Romania) ORA
1	(Greece) NC Vouliagmeni	3	3	0	0	0	40	25	+15	**9**	Main round	—	12–8	—	—
2	(Italy) CC Ortigia	3	2	0	0	1	38	33	+5	**6**		—	—	16–14	—
3	(Croatia) Primorje Erste Bank Rijeka	3	1	0	0	2	36	37	−1	**3**		12–14	—	—	—
4	(Romania) CSM Oradea (H)	3	0	0	0	3	19	38	−19	**0**		5–14	7–14	7–10	—

Source: LEN
(H) Host

=== Group D ===
8–10 September 2023, Dubrovnik, Croatia

Pos	Team	Pld	W	PSW	PSL	L	GF	GA	GD	Pts	Qualification	(Croatia) JUG	(France) TOU	(Hungary) OSC	(Romania) DIN
1	(Croatia) Jug AO Dubrovnik (H)	3	3	0	0	0	47	22	+25	**9**	Main round	—	17–8	14–10	16–4
2	(France) EN Tourcoing	3	2	0	0	1	32	30	+2	**6**		—	—	—	—
3	(Hungary) OSC Budapest	3	1	0	0	2	35	33	+2	**3**		—	5–10	—	20–9
4	(Romania) Dinamo București	3	0	0	0	3	21	50	−29	**0**		—	8–14	—	—

Source: LEN
(H) Host

== Main round ==
Location of teams of the 2023–24 LEN Champions League group stage.
Red: Group A; Blue: Group B; Yellow: Group C; Green: Group D

The top two from each group make the quarter-finals round. The bottom two from each group drops down to the Euro Cup eighth-finals.

Teams are ranked according to points (3 points for a win, 2 points for a penalty shootout win, 1 point for a penalty shootout loss, 0 points for a loss), and if tied on points, the following tiebreaking criteria are applied, in the order given, to determine the rankings:

- Points in head-to-head matches among tied teams;
- Goal difference in head-to-head matches among tied teams;
- Goals scored in head-to-head matches among tied teams;
- Goal difference in all group matches;
- Goals scored in all group matches.

Among the teams, 13 return from last season. Steaua București and Crvena zvezda return after a one-season absence, while Jadran Herceg Novi return after a two-season absence. They all replaced Waspo'98 Hannover, Radnički Kragujevac and Genesys OSC-Budapest.

In regards to countries, all 9 from last season return, with the inclusion of Romania and Montenegro after one and two-season absences, bringing the number up to 11.

=== Group A ===
Pos	Team	Pld	W	PSW	PSL	L	GF	GA	GD	Pts	Qualification	(Serbia) NOV	(Italy) BRE	(Spain) SAB	(Romania) STE
1	(Serbia) Novi Beograd	6	5	0	0	1	78	44	+34	15	Advance to quarter-finals	—	13–5	10–12	19–7
2	(Italy) AN Brescia	6	3	1	0	2	62	56	+6	11	Advance to quarter-finals	8–13	—	11–10	16–7
3	(Spain) Astralpool Sabadell	6	3	0	1	2	58	51	+7	10	Transfer to Euro Cup	7–11	9–10 (Note: Match ended 5–5, AN Brescia won 5–4 on penalties)	—	13–6
4	(Romania) Steaua București	6	0	0	0	6	41	88	−47	0	Transfer to Euro Cup	5–12	8–17	8–11	—

Source: LEN Champions League

=== Group B ===
Pos	Team	Pld	W	PSW	PSL	L	GF	GA	GD	Pts	Qualification	(Italy) PRO	(Greece) OLY	(Croatia) JUG	(Georgia (country)) TBI
1	(Italy) Pro Recco	6	6	0	0	0	81	52	+29	18	Advance to quarter-finals	—	12–11	13–9	15–6
2	(Greece) Olympiacos Piraeus	6	3	1	0	2	83	54	+29	11	Advance to quarter-finals	10–11	—	16–15 (Note: Match ended 12–12, Olympiacos Piraeus won 4–3 on penalties)	16–8
3	(Croatia) Jug AO Dubrovnik	6	2	0	1	3	64	72	−8	7	Transfer to Euro Cup	7–14	5–15	—	19–13
4	(Georgia (country)) Dinamo Tbilisi	6	0	0	0	6	47	97	−50	0	Transfer to Euro Cup	9–16	6–19	5–12	—

Source: LEN Champions League

=== Group C ===
Pos	Team	Pld	W	PSW	PSL	L	GF	GA	GD	Pts	Qualification	(Hungary) FTC	(Croatia) SPI	(Serbia) CRV	(Montenegro) JAD
1	(Hungary) FTC-Telekom	6	5	1	0	0	91	56	+35	17	Advance to quarter-finals	—	13–11	20–6	9–7
2	(Croatia) Jadran Split	6	3	0	1	2	81	78	+3	10	Advance to quarter-finals	17–20 (Note: Match ended 16–16, FTC-Telekom won 4–1 on penalties)	—	16–13	16–14
3	(Serbia) Crvena zvezda	6	2	0	1	3	54	77	−23	7	Transfer to Euro Cup	6–16	12–11	—	9–6
4	(Montenegro) Jadran Herceg Novi	6	0	1	0	5	55	70	−15	2	Transfer to Euro Cup	10–17	10–11	21–20 (Note: Match ended 8–8, Jadran Herceg Novi won 13–12 on penalties)	—

Source: LEN Champions League

=== Group D ===
Pos	Team	Pld	W	PSW	PSL	L	GF	GA	GD	Pts	Qualification	(Spain) BAR	(France) MAR	(Germany) SPA	(Greece) VOU
1	(Spain) Zodiac Atlètic-Barceloneta	6	6	0	0	0	79	52	+27	18	Advance to quarter-finals	—	9–7	16–6	16–10
2	(France) CN Marseille	6	3	0	0	3	69	68	+1	9	Advance to quarter-finals	12–13	—	13–11	15–13
3	(Germany) Spandau 04	6	2	0	0	4	56	75	−19	6	Transfer to Euro Cup	6–13	13–10	—	14–13
4	(Greece) NC Vouliagmeni	6	1	0	0	5	66	75	−9	3	Transfer to Euro Cup	11–12	9–12	10–6	—

Source: LEN Champions League

== Quarter-finals round ==
The four group winners and four group runners-up were drawn into two groups, with each one containing two group winners and two group runners-up. The top two teams in each group advanced to the Final Four.

=== Draw ===
The draw took place in Barcelona. The seeded and unseeded clubs consist of the teams that finished first and second in the previous round respectively. The only restriction was that clubs from the same group in the Main round could not be drawn against each other.

Seeded	Unseeded
(Serbia) Novi Beograd (Italy) Pro Recco (Hungary) FTC-Telekom (Spain) Zodiac Atlètic-Barceloneta	(Italy) AN Brescia (Greece) Olympiacos Piraeus (Croatia) Jadran Split (France) CN Marseille

Teams are ranked according to points (3 points for a win, 2 points for a penalty shootout win, 1 point for a penalty shootout loss, 0 points for a loss), and if tied on points, the following tiebreaking criteria are applied, in the order given, to determine the rankings:

- Points in head-to-head matches among tied teams;
- Goal difference in head-to-head matches among tied teams;
- Goals scored in head-to-head matches among tied teams;
- Goal difference in all group matches;
- Goals scored in all group matches.

=== Group A ===
Pos	Team	Pld	W	PSW	PSL	L	GF	GA	GD	Pts	Qualification	(Italy) PRO	(Serbia) NOV	(France) MAR	(Croatia) JAD
1	(Italy) Pro Recco	6	5	1	0	0	88	58	+30	17	Final four	—	15–7	15–8	18–9
2	(Serbia) Novi Beograd	6	4	0	1	1	78	74	+4	13	Final four	14–15 (Note: Match ended 10–10, Pro Recco won 5–4 on penalties)	—	13–10	15–11
3	(France) CN Marseille	6	2	0	0	4	72	76	−4	6		10–12	13–14	—	17–10
4	(Croatia) Jadran Split	6	0	0	0	6	62	92	−30	0		10–13	10–15	12–14	—

Source: LEN Champions League

=== Group B ===
Pos	Team	Pld	W	PSW	PSL	L	GF	GA	GD	Pts	Qualification	(Hungary) FTC	(Greece) OLY	(Spain) BAR	(Italy) BRE
1	(Hungary) FTC-Telekom	6	5	0	0	1	62	55	+7	15	Final four	—	11–9	13–11	9–8
2	(Greece) Olympiacos Piraeus	6	4	1	0	1	78	68	+10	14	Final four	10–8	—	10–7	17–12
3	(Spain) Zodiac Atlètic-Barceloneta	6	2	0	1	3	68	65	+3	7		8–10	18–19 (Note: Match ended 13–13, Olympiacos Piraeus won 6–5 on penalties)	—	12–8
4	(Italy) AN Brescia	6	0	0	0	6	54	74	−20	0		9–11	12–13	5–12	—

Source: LEN Champions League

== Final Four ==
The Final Four tournament was held from the 5 to 7 June 2024 at the National Pool Complex in Valletta, Malta.

=== Bracket ===
Semi-finals
5 June
(Italy) Pro Recco (PSO)	13
(Greece) Olympiacos Piraeus	11
5 June
(Hungary) FTC-Telekom (PSO)	18
(Serbia) Novi Beograd	17

Final
7 June
(Italy) Pro Recco	11
(Hungary) FTC-Telekom	12
Third place
7 June
(Greece) Olympiacos Piraeus	9
(Serbia) Novi Beograd	6

=== Semi-finals ===
5 June 2024; 19:00	Report	Pro Recco (Italy)	13–11 (PSO)	(Greece) Olympiacos Piraeus	National Pool Complex, Valletta; Referees: Adrian Tiberiu Alexandrescu (ROU), Sebastien Dervieux (FRA)
5 June 2024; 19:00	Report	Score by quarters: 3–0, 1–2, 3–3, 2–4 PSO: 4–2			National Pool Complex, Valletta; Referees: Adrian Tiberiu Alexandrescu (ROU), Sebastien Dervieux (FRA)
5 June 2024; 19:00	Report	Di Fulvio, Younger 2	Goals	Genidounias 3	National Pool Complex, Valletta; Referees: Adrian Tiberiu Alexandrescu (ROU), Sebastien Dervieux (FRA)

5 June 2024; 21:00	Report	FTC-Telekom (Hungary)	18–17 (PSO)	(Serbia) Novi Beograd	National Pool Complex, Valletta; Referees: Boris Margeta (SLO), David Gomez (ESP)
5 June 2024; 21:00	Report	Score by quarters: 4–4, 3–2, 5–4, 1–3 PSO: 5–4			National Pool Complex, Valletta; Referees: Boris Margeta (SLO), David Gomez (ESP)
5 June 2024; 21:00	Report	Mandić 5	Goals	Vlachopoulos 4	National Pool Complex, Valletta; Referees: Boris Margeta (SLO), David Gomez (ESP)

=== Third place match ===
7 June 2024; 19:00	Report	Olympiacos Piraeus (Greece)	9–6	(Serbia) Novi Beograd	National Pool Complex, Valletta; Referees: Frank Ohme (GER), Andrej Franulović (CRO)
7 June 2024; 19:00	Report	Score by quarters: 4–1, 3–3, 1–1, 1–1			National Pool Complex, Valletta; Referees: Frank Ohme (GER), Andrej Franulović (CRO)
7 June 2024; 19:00	Report	Fountoulis 3	Goals	Ćuk 2	National Pool Complex, Valletta; Referees: Frank Ohme (GER), Andrej Franulović (CRO)

=== Final ===
7 June 2024; 21:00	Report	Pro Recco (Italy)	11–12	(Hungary) FTC-Telekom	National Pool Complex, Valletta; Attendance: 3,000; Referees: Boris Margeta (SLO), Adrian Tiberiu Alexandrescu (ROU)
7 June 2024; 21:00	Report	Score by quarters: 2–2, 2–4, 3–3, 4–3			National Pool Complex, Valletta; Attendance: 3,000; Referees: Boris Margeta (SLO), Adrian Tiberiu Alexandrescu (ROU)
7 June 2024; 21:00	Report	four players 2	Goals	Mandić 4	National Pool Complex, Valletta; Attendance: 3,000; Referees: Boris Margeta (SLO), Adrian Tiberiu Alexandrescu (ROU)

2023–24 LEN Champions League Champions

FTC-Telekom
2nd title

== Awards ==
Season MVP	Top Scorer	Finals MVP
(Serbia) Dušan Mandić (FTC-Telekom)	(Spain) Alvaro Granados (Novi Beograd) [39 goals]	(Serbia) Dušan Mandić (FTC-Telekom)

Total 7 of the Season
LW	(Serbia) Andrija Prlainović (CN Marseille)	CF	(Greece) Kostas Kakaris (Pro Recco)	RW	(Serbia) Dušan Mandić (FTC-Telekom)
LD	(Spain) Álvaro Granados (Novi Beograd)	CB	(Australia) Aaron Younger (Pro Recco)	RD	(Greece) Konstantinos Genidounias (Olympiacos Piraeus)
		GK	(Hungary) Soma Vogel (FTC-Telekom)		

== See also ==
- 2023–24 LEN Euro Cup
- 2023–24 LEN Challenger Cup
- 2023 LEN Super Cup
- 2023–24 LEN Women's Champions League
- 2023–24 LEN Women's Euro Cup
- 2023–24 LEN Women's Challenger Cup
- 2023 LEN Women's Super Cup
