= 2023 LEN Super Cup =

Water polo match

Tournament details
- Arena: Mario Rivera Pool; Chiavari, Italy
- Dates: 10 November 2023

Final positions
- Champions: (Italy) Pro Recco (9th title)
- Runners-up: (Hungary) A-Híd VasasPlaket

Awards and statistics
- Top scorer(s): Cannella, Zalánki (6 goals each)

The 2023 LEN Super Cup was the 41st edition of the annual trophy organised by LEN and contested by the reigning champions of the two European competitions for men's water polo clubs. The match was played between European champions Pro Recco (winners of the 2022–23 LEN Champions League) and A-Híd VasasPlaket (winners of the 2022–23 LEN Euro Cup). The match was held on 10 November. Pro Recco won their third consecutive title, becoming the first club to achieve that feat, after they beat A-Híd VasasPlaket 18–10.

== Teams ==
Team	Qualification	Previous participation (bold indicates winners)
(Italy) Pro Recco	Winners of the 2022–23 LEN Champions League	1984 **2003**, **2007**, **2008**, **2010**, **2012**, **2015**, **2021**, **2022**
(Hungary) A-Híd VasasPlaket	Winners of the 2022–23 LEN Euro Cup	1980, **1985**, 1986, 2002

== Match ==
10 November; 20:45	Report	**Pro Recco** (Italy)	**18**–10	(Hungary) A-Híd VasasPlaket	Mario Rivera Pool, Chiavari; Referees: Adrian Tiberiu Alexandrescu (ROU), Sebastien Dervieux (FRA)
10 November; 20:45	Report	Score by quarters: **3**–1, **4**–1, 3–**5**, **8**–3			Mario Rivera Pool, Chiavari; Referees: Adrian Tiberiu Alexandrescu (ROU), Sebastien Dervieux (FRA)
10 November; 20:45	Report	Cannella, Zalánki 6	**Goals**	Bátori, Ranđelović 3	Mario Rivera Pool, Chiavari; Referees: Adrian Tiberiu Alexandrescu (ROU), Sebastien Dervieux (FRA)

== See also ==
- 2023–24 LEN Champions League
- 2023–24 LEN Euro Cup
- 2023–24 LEN Challenger Cup
- 2023–24 LEN Women's Champions League
- 2023–24 LEN Women's Euro Cup
- 2023–24 LEN Women's Challenger Cup
- 2023 LEN Women's Super Cup
