= 2023–24 LEN Euro Cup =

- League: LEN Euro Cup
- Sport: Water polo
- Duration: 21 September 2023 – 18 May 2024
- Games: 140
- Teams: 36 (from 10+1 countries)
- Finals champions: (Croatia) Jug AO Dubrovnik (2nd title)
- Runners-up: (Croatia) Primorje Erste Bank Rijeka

LEN Euro Cup seasons
- 2022–23 2024–25

The 2023–24 LEN Euro Cup is the 32nd edition of the water polo competition organised by the Ligue Européenne de Natation (LEN). This is the first season under the new changes made by LEN.

The defending champions were A-Híd Vasas Plaket, but they were eliminated by Jug AO Dubrovnik in the eight-finals.

The winners were Jug AO Dubrovnik, who defeated Primorje Erste Bank Rijeka 12–6 in an all-Croatian final.

== Format ==
36 teams (14 from Champions League and 18 starting in this competition) will compete in this tournament. The 36 teams are divided into eight groups, four with five clubs and four with four teams. The groups are held in one country, where the top 2 in every group advances to the group stage. For the first time ever, the group stage will be played in a home and away system. Like the previous round, the top 2 progresses into the knockout stage. The 8 teams left, plus the 8 teams that were eliminated at the Champions League main round, go into the knockout stage. There will be eighth-finals, quarter-finals and a final four competition to decide the champions.

== Rankings ==
Starting this season, LEN also started a club rankings. Excluding the teams eliminated from the Champion League, only countries ranked in the top 12 can enter a maximum of three teams in the Euro Cup.

Rank	Association	Points	Teams
1	Italy	118,765	4
2	Hungary	91,047.5	5
3	Spain	75,387.5	4
4	Serbia	68,902.5	4
5	Greece	64,375	4
6	Croatia	56,065	3
7	France	47,207.5	4
8	Germany	41,660	5
9	Romania	19,800	2
10	Montenegro	17,700	1
11	(Georgia (country)) Georgia	11,245	0
12	Russia	10,490	0
13	Netherlands	5,005	0

Rank	Association	Points	Teams
14	Turkey	4,807.5	0
15	Slovakia	1,870	0
16	Bosnia and Herzegovina	1,415	0
17	Portugal	1,385	0
18	Switzerland	1,210	0
19	Slovenia	1,160	0
20	Israel	860	0
21	Poland	635	0
22	Denmark	560	0
23	Lithuania	515	0
24	Malta	435	0
24	Ukraine	435	0

== Teams ==
Eliminated in Champions League qualification round
(Croatia) Primorje Erste Bank Rijeka	(France) CN Noisy-le-Sec	(France) EN Tourcoing	(Germany) Waspo'98 Hannover
(Germany) ASC Duisburg	(Greece) GS Apollon Smyrnis	(Hungary) OSC Budapest	(Hungary) Endo Plus Service Honvéd
(Italy) CC Ortigia	(Montenegro) Primorac Kotor	(Romania) CSM Oradea	(Romania) Dinamo București
(Serbia) Radnički Kragujevac	(Spain) CN Barcelona		

Entering this tournament
(Croatia) HAVK Mladost Zagreb (4th)	(Croatia) Solaris Šibenik (5th)	(France) Pays d'Aix Natation (5th)	(France) Sète Natation (6th)
(Germany) White Sharks Hannover (4th)	(Germany) SV Ludwigsburg 08 (5th)	(Germany) OSC Potsdam (6th)	(Greece) Panionios GSS (4th)
(Greece) G.S. Peristeri (5th)	(Greece) Panathinaikos (6th)	(Hungary) A-Híd Vasas Plaket (4th)	(Hungary) BVSC-Zugló (5th)
(Hungary) Szolnoki Dózsa (6th)	(Italy) Telimar Palermo (4th)	(Italy) Pallanuoto Trieste (5th)	(Italy) RN Savona (6th)
(Serbia) Partizan Beograd (4th)	(Serbia) VK Šabac (5th)	(Serbia) VK Valis (6th)	(Spain) CN Terrassa (4th)
(Spain) CN Mataró (5th)	(Spain) Tenerife Echeyde (6th)		

== Round and draw dates ==
=== Schedule ===
Phase	Round	Round date
Qualification round		21–24 September 2023
Main round	Matchday 1	6–7 October 2023
Main round	Matchday 2	19 October 2023
Main round	Matchday 3	2 November 2023
Main round	Matchday 4	16 November 2023
Main round	Matchday 5	23 November 2023
Main round	Matchday 6	9 December 2024
Eighth-finals	First leg	8 March 2024
Eighth-finals	Second leg	23 March 2024
Quarter-finals	First leg	6 April 2024
Quarter-finals	Second leg	27 April 2024
Final four	Semifinals	17 May 2024
Final four	Final	18 May 2024

== Qualification round ==
=== Draw ===
The draw was on 11 September 2023. H indicates which club is hosting the groups. Teams in bold advanced to the group stage. The seeding was decided by as follows:

- The new LEN club rankings.
- LEN country club rankings.
- LEN men's national team rankings (although not applied).

Pot 1	Pot 2	Pot 3	Pot 4	Pot 5
(Germany) **Waspo'98 Hannover** (Hungary) OSC Budapest (Italy) **CC Ortigia** (Hungary) Szolnoki Dózsa (Italy) **RN Savona** (Serbia) Radnički Kragujevac (Spain) **CN Barcelona** **(H)** (Hungary) **A-Híd Vasas Plaket**	(Croatia) HAVK Mladost Zagreb (Montenegro) **Primorac Kotor** **(H)** (Serbia) **VK Šabac** **(H)** (Italy) **Telimar Palermo** (France) **EN Tourcoing** **(H)** (Romania) CSM Oradea (Hungary) **BVSC-Zugló** **(H)** (Greece) **Panionios GSS** **(H)**	(Italy) **Pallanuoto Trieste** (Spain) CN Terrassa (France) CN Noisy-le-Sec (Greece) **GS Apollon Smyrnis** (Serbia) Partizan Beograd (Croatia) **Solaris Šibenik** (Germany) SV Ludwigsburg 08 (Hungary) **Endo Plus Service Honvéd**	(France) Pays d'Aix Natation (Germany) ASC Duisburg **(H)** (Greece) G.S. Peristeri (Spain) Tenerife Echeyde (Croatia) **Primorje Erste Bank Rijeka** **(H)** (Germany) OSC Potsdam (Serbia) VK Valis (Spain) CN Mataró	(Greece) Panathinaikos (France) Sète Natation (Germany) White Sharks Hannover (Romania) Dinamo București

=== Group A ===
Pos	Team	Pld	W	PSW	PSL	L	GF	GA	GD	Pts	Qualification	(Serbia) SAB	(Italy) ORT	(France) NOI	(Serbia) VAL	(Romania) DIN
1	(Serbia) VK Šabac (H)	4	4	0	0	0	53	27	+26	**12**	Group stage	—	11–9	13–9	14–5	15–4
2	(Italy) CC Ortigia	4	3	0	0	1	55	42	+13	**9**	Group stage	—	—	—	17–10	—
3	(France) CN Noisy-le-Sec	4	2	0	0	2	51	48	+3	**6**		—	11–16	—	—	—
4	(Serbia) VK Valis	4	1	0	0	3	43	52	−9	**3**		—	—	11–14	—	17–7
5	(Romania) Dinamo București	4	0	0	0	4	29	62	−33	**0**		—	10–13	8–17	—	—

Source: Report
(H) Host

=== Group B ===
Pos	Team	Pld	W	PSW	PSL	L	GF	GA	GD	Pts	Qualification	(Hungary) VAS	(Hungary) ZUG	(Spain) MAT	(Germany) LUD
1	(Hungary) A-Híd Vasas Plaket	3	3	0	0	0	54	34	+20	**9**	Group stage	—	—	18–11	20–8
2	(Hungary) BVSC-Zugló (H)	3	2	0	0	1	48	33	+15	**6**	Group stage	15–16	—	16–5	17–12
3	(Spain) CN Mataró	3	1	0	0	2	28	43	−15	**3**		—	—	—	12–9
4	(Germany) SV Ludwigsburg 08	3	0	0	0	3	29	49	−20	**0**		—	—	—	—

Source: Report
(H) Host

=== Group C ===
Pos	Team	Pld	W	PSW	PSL	L	GF	GA	GD	Pts	Qualification	(Italy) TRI	(France) TOU	(Hungary) SZO	(France) PAY
1	(Italy) Pallanuoto Trieste	3	3	0	0	0	46	28	+18	**9**	Group stage	—	—	15–11	—
2	(France) EN Tourcoing (H)	3	2	0	0	1	34	32	+2	**6**	Group stage	11–12	—	—	11–10
3	(Hungary) Szolnoki Dózsa	3	1	0	0	2	43	37	+6	**3**		—	10–12	—	22–10
4	(France) Pays d'Aix Natation	3	0	0	0	3	26	52	−26	**0**		6–19	—	—	—

Source: Report
(H) Host

=== Group D ===
Pos	Team	Pld	W	PSW	PSL	L	GF	GA	GD	Pts	Qualification	(Croatia) PRI	(Croatia) SOL	(Romania) ORA	(Serbia) RAD
1	(Croatia) Primorje Erste Bank Rijeka (H)	3	3	0	0	0	39	20	+19	**9**	Group stage	—	—	11–8	8–6
2	(Croatia) Solaris Šibenik	3	2	0	0	1	29	41	−12	**6**	Group stage	6–20	—	13–12	—
3	(Romania) CSM Oradea	3	1	0	0	2	29	31	−2	**3**		—	—	—	9–7
4	(Serbia) Radnički Kragujevac	3	0	0	0	3	22	27	−5	**0**		—	9–10	—	—

Source: Report
(H) Host

=== Group E ===
Pos	Team	Pld	W	PSW	PSL	L	GF	GA	GD	Pts	Qualification	(Hungary) HON	(Greece) PAN	(Hungary) OSC	(Spain) TEN	(Germany) HAN
1	(Hungary) Endo Plus Service Honvéd	4	4	0	0	0	56	36	+20	**12**	Group stage	—	15–12	—	18–9	—
2	(Greece) Panionios GSS (H)	4	3	0	0	1	64	38	+26	**9**	Group stage	—	—	14–11	—	23–7
3	(Hungary) OSC Budapest	4	2	0	0	2	57	40	+17	**6**		9–10	—	—	20–11	—
4	(Spain) Tenerife Echeyde	4	0	1	0	3	34	63	−29	**2**		—	5–15	—	—	13–11 (Note: Match ended 10–10, Tenerife Echeyde won 3–1 on penalties)
5	(Germany) White Sharks Hannover	4	0	0	1	3	28	62	−34	**1**		6–13	—	5–17	—	—

Source: Report
(H) Host

=== Group F ===
Pos	Team	Pld	W	PSW	PSL	L	GF	GA	GD	Pts	Qualification	(Italy) TEL	(Italy) SAV	(Serbia) PAR	(France) SET	(Germany) DUI
1	(Italy) Telimar Palermo	4	3	0	1	0	53	37	+16	**10**	Group stage	—	—	—	15–7	—
2	(Italy) RN Savona	4	3	0	0	1	57	42	+15	**9**	Group stage	10–12	—	—	—	—
3	(Serbia) Partizan Beograd	4	2	1	0	1	53	45	+8	**8**		17–15 (Note: Match ended 12–12, Partizan Beograd won 5–3 on penalties)	10–15	—	16–7	—
4	(France) Sète Natation	4	1	0	0	3	32	57	−25	**3**		—	8–16	—	—	—
5	(Germany) ASC Duisburg (H)	4	0	0	0	4	40	54	−14	**0**		8–14	9–13	11–14	9–10	—

Source: Report
(H) Host

=== Group G ===
Pos	Team	Pld	W	PSW	PSL	L	GF	GA	GD	Pts	Qualification	(Spain) BAR	(Greece) APO	(Croatia) MLA	(Germany) POT
1	(Spain) CN Barcelona (H)	3	3	0	0	0	47	23	+24	**9**	Group stage	—	13–6	12–11	23–6
2	(Greece) GS Apollon Smyrnis	3	2	0	0	1	40	31	+9	**6**	Group stage	—	—	—	—
3	(Croatia) HAVK Mladost Zagreb	3	1	0	0	2	41	36	+5	**3**		—	7–15	—	—
4	(Germany) OSC Potsdam	3	0	0	0	3	26	64	−38	**0**		—	11–19	9–23	—

Source: Report
(H) Host

=== Group H ===
Pos	Team	Pld	W	PSW	PSL	L	GF	GA	GD	Pts	Qualification	(Montenegro) KOT	(Germany) HAN	(Greece) PER	(Spain) TER	(Greece) PAN
1	(Montenegro) Primorac Kotor (H)	4	3	1	0	0	40	29	+11	**11**	Group stage	—	11–7	12–6	14–12 (Note: Match ended 9–9, Primorac Kotor won 5–3 on penalties)	8–7
2	(Germany) Waspo'98 Hannover	4	3	0	0	1	43	37	+6	**9**	Group stage	—	—	15–9	7–6	—
3	(Greece) G.S. Peristeri	4	1	1	0	2	37	48	−11	**5**		—	—	—	14–13	12–10 (Note: Match ended 8–8, G.S. Peristeri won 4–2 on penalties)
4	(Spain) CN Terrassa	4	1	0	1	2	46	42	+4	**4**		—	—	—	—	18–12
5	(Greece) Panathinaikos	4	0	0	1	3	38	48	−10	**1**		—	11–14	—	—	—

Source: Report
(H) Host

== Group stage ==
Location of teams of the 2023–24 LEN Euro Cup group stage.
Red: Group A; Blue: Group B; Yellow: Group C; Green: Group D.

The draw took place on 26 September 2023 in Barcelona, Spain. The top 2 from every group advances to the eighth-finals.

Teams are ranked according to points (3 points for a win, 2 points for a penalty shootout win, 1 point for a penalty shootout loss, 0 points for a loss), and if tied on points, the following tiebreaking criteria are applied, in the order given, to determine the rankings:

- Points in head-to-head matches among tied teams;
- Goal difference in head-to-head matches among tied teams;
- Goals scored in head-to-head matches among tied teams;
- Goal difference in all group matches;
- Goals scored in all group matches.

This is the first time that this round is being held in a home and away format. Nine countries are being represented, with Italy boasting the most clubs with four.

=== Seeding ===
The eight teams in pot 1 won their group in the qualification round, while the 8 runners-up in the qualification round are in pot 2.

Pot 1	Pot 2
(Serbia) VK Šabac (Hungary) A-Híd Vasas Plaket (Italy) Pallanuoto Trieste (Croatia) Primorje Erste Bank Rijeka (Hungary) Endo Plus Service Honvéd (Italy) Telimar Palermo (Spain) CN Barcelona (Montenegro) Primorac Kotor	(Italy) CC Ortigia (Hungary) BVSC-Zugló (France) EN Tourcoing (Croatia) Solaris Šibenik (Greece) Panionios GSS (Italy) RN Savona (Greece) GS Apollon Smyrnis (Germany) Waspo'98 Hannover

=== Group A ===
Pos	Team	Pld	W	PSW	PSL	L	GF	GA	GD	Pts	Qualification	(Spain) BAR	(France) TOU	(Italy) TEL	(Croatia) SOL
1	(Spain) CN Barcelona	6	5	0	0	1	73	53	+20	15	Eighth-finals	—	15–13	11–3	8–7
2	(France) EN Tourcoing	6	3	0	1	2	65	66	−1	10	Eighth-finals	9–13	—	14–11	17–18 (Note: Match ended 10–10, Solaris Šibenik won 8–7 on penalties)
3	(Italy) Telimar Palermo	6	2	0	0	4	57	68	−11	6		12–11	9–10	—	11–9
4	(Croatia) Solaris Šibenik	6	1	1	0	4	56	64	−8	5		9–15	8–9	13–11	—

Source: LEN

=== Group B ===
Pos	Team	Pld	W	PSW	PSL	L	GF	GA	GD	Pts	Qualification	(Italy) SAV	(Hungary) VAS	(Hungary) HON	(Greece) APO
1	(Italy) RN Savona	6	5	0	0	1	78	64	+14	15	Eighth-finals	—	16–13	14–7	13–10
2	(Hungary) A-Híd Vasas Plaket	6	4	0	1	1	86	74	+12	13	Eighth-finals	18–17	—	16–19 (Note: Match ended 15–15, Endo Plus Service Honvéd won 4–1 on penalties)	19–15
3	(Hungary) Endo Plus Service Honvéd	6	2	1	0	3	53	67	−14	8		5–6	3–11	—	12–11
4	(Greece) GS Apollon Smyrnis	6	0	0	0	6	65	77	−12	0		11–12	8–10	10–11	—

Source: LEN

=== Group C ===
Pos	Team	Pld	W	PSW	PSL	L	GF	GA	GD	Pts	Qualification	(Croatia) RIJ	(Hungary) ZUG	(Serbia) SAB	(Germany) HAN
1	(Croatia) Primorje Erste Bank Rijeka	6	4	0	0	2	84	71	+13	12 (Note: Primorje Erste Bank Rijeka 32–32 BVSC-Zugló, placements are decided by goal difference)	Eighth-finals	—	19–10	15–10	13–9
2	(Hungary) BVSC-Zugló	6	4	0	0	2	78	72	+6	12	Eighth-finals	22–13	—	11–9	10–9
3	(Serbia) VK Šabac	6	3	0	0	3	59	58	+1	9		10–8	10–8	—	14–4
4	(Germany) Waspo'98 Hannover	6	1	0	0	5	56	76	−20	3		10–16	12–17	12–6	—

Source: LEN

=== Group D ===
Pos	Team	Pld	W	PSW	PSL	L	GF	GA	GD	Pts	Qualification	(Greece) PAN	(Italy) ORT	(Montenegro) KOT	(Italy) TRI
1	(Greece) Panionios GSS	6	3	1	0	2	67	62	+5	11	Eighth-finals	—	13–10	8–5	26–25 (Note: Match ended 16–16, Panionios GSS won 10–9 on penalties)
2	(Italy) CC Ortigia	6	3	0	0	3	73	76	−3	9 (Note: CC Ortigia 27–26 Primorac Kotor)	Eighth-finals	13–12	—	9–14	11–14
3	(Montenegro) Primorac Kotor	6	3	0	0	3	61	63	−2	9		9–10	12–18	—	9–8
4	(Italy) Pallanuoto Trieste	6	2	0	1	3	68	68	0	7		9–8	11–12	10–12	—

Source: LEN

== Knockout stage ==
Eight-finals
8 March/23 March
(Italy) CC Ortigia	8	12	20
(Germany) Spandau 04	8	14	22
8 March/23 March
(Montenegro) Jadran Herceg Novi	10	13	23
(Italy) RN Savona	16	12	28
8 March/23 March
(Spain) Astralpool Sabadell	18	15	33
(France) EN Tourcoing	11	12	23
8 March/23 March
(Romania) Steaua București	11	20 PS	31
(Greece) Panionios GSS	12	18	30
8 March/23 March
(Serbia) Crvena zvezda	11	12	23
(Hungary) BVSC-Zugló	13	9	22
8 March/23 March
(Hungary) A-Híd Vasas Plaket	11	8	19
(Croatia) Jug AO Dubrovnik	12	9	21
8 March/23 March
(Georgia (country)) Dinamo Tbilisi	7	15	22
(Croatia) Primorje Erste Bank Rijeka	8	20	28
8 March/23 March
(Greece) NC Vouliagmeni	17	10	27
(Spain) CN Barcelona	13	6	19

Quarter-finals
6 April/27 April
(Germany) Spandau 04	11	12	23
(Italy) RN Savona	10	10	20
6 April/27 April
(Spain) Astralpool Sabadell	6	7	13
(Romania) Steaua București	5	6	11
9 April/27 April
(Serbia) Crvena zvezda	9	10	19
(Croatia) Jug AO Dubrovnik	15	14	29
6 April/27 April
(Croatia) Primorje Erste Bank Rijeka	9	15	24
(Greece) NC Vouliagmeni	14	9	23

=== Eight-finals ===
Team 1	Agg.	Team 2	1st leg	2nd leg
Jug AO Dubrovnik (Croatia)	21–19	(Hungary) A-Híd Vasas Plaket	12–11	9–8
BVSC-Zugló (Hungary)	22–23	(Serbia) Crvena zvezda	13–11	9–12
Spandau 04 (Germany)	22–20	(Italy) CC Ortigia	8–8	14–12
Astralpool Sabadell (Spain)	33–23	(France) EN Tourcoing	18–11	15–12
Panionios GSS (Greece)	30–31	(Romania) Steaua București	12–11	18–20 PS
Primorje Erste Bank Rijeka (Croatia)	28–22	(Georgia (country)) Dinamo Tbilisi	8–7	20–15
RN Savona (Italy)	28–23	(Montenegro) Jadran Herceg Novi	16–10	12–13
CN Barcelona (Spain)	19–27	(Greece) NC Vouliagmeni	13–17	6–10

=== Quarter-finals ===
The draw took place in Barcelona on 26 March 2024. There was no seeding.

Team 1	Agg.	Team 2	1st leg	2nd leg
RN Savona (Italy)	20–23	(Germany) Spandau 04	10–11	10–12
Steaua București (Romania)	11–13	(Spain) Astralpool Sabadell	5–6	6–7
Jug AO Dubrovnik (Croatia)	29–19	(Serbia) Crvena zvezda	15–9	14–10
NC Vouliagmeni (Greece)	23–24	(Croatia) Primorje Erste Bank Rijeka	14–9	9–15

== Final four ==
The final four was held at the Bazeni Kantrida in the Croatian city, Rijeka. The city was given the hosting rights on 2 May 2024. Originally, NC Vouliagmeni won the hosting rights, but after they were eliminated, Primorje Erste Bank Rijeka, backed by the Rijeka government, decided to file an application. Primorje Erste Bank Rijeka paid LEN 40,000 Euros in order to organise the event.

=== Bracket ===
Semi-finals
17 May
(Germany) Spandau 04	12
(Croatia) Primorje Erste Bank Rijeka	14
17 May
(Spain) Astralpool Sabadell	7
(Croatia) Jug AO Dubrovnik	11

Final
18 May
(Croatia) Primorje Erste Bank Rijeka	6
(Croatia) Jug AO Dubrovnik	12
Third place
18 May
(Germany) Spandau 04	2
(Spain) Astralpool Sabadell	9

=== Semi-finals ===
17 May 2024; 17:45	Report	Astralpool Sabadell (Spain)	7–11	(Croatia) Jug AO Dubrovnik	Bazeni Kantrida, Rijeka; Referees: Georgios Stavridis (GRE), Michiel Zwart (NED)
17 May 2024; 17:45	Report	Score by quarters: 2–3, 1–3, 3–3, 1–2			Bazeni Kantrida, Rijeka; Referees: Georgios Stavridis (GRE), Michiel Zwart (NED)
17 May 2024; 17:45	Report	Vidović 2	Goals	Lazic 5	Bazeni Kantrida, Rijeka; Referees: Georgios Stavridis (GRE), Michiel Zwart (NED)

17 May 2024; 20:00	Report	Spandau 04 (Germany)	12–14	(Croatia) Primorje Erste Bank Rijeka	Bazeni Kantrida, Rijeka; Referees: Alessandro Severo (ITA), Tamas Kovacs-Csatlos (HUN)
17 May 2024; 20:00	Report	Score by quarters: 3–4, 3–0, 4–7, 2–3			Bazeni Kantrida, Rijeka; Referees: Alessandro Severo (ITA), Tamas Kovacs-Csatlos (HUN)
17 May 2024; 20:00	Report	Strelezkij 5	Goals	four players 3	Bazeni Kantrida, Rijeka; Referees: Alessandro Severo (ITA), Tamas Kovacs-Csatlos (HUN)

=== Third place match ===
18 May 2024; 17:45	Report	Astralpool Sabadell (Spain)	9–2	(Germany) Spandau 04	Bazeni Kantrida, Rijeka; Referees: Vojin Putnikovic (SRB), Michiel Zwart (NED)
18 May 2024; 17:45	Report	Score by quarters: 1–0, 2–1, 3–0, 3–1			Bazeni Kantrida, Rijeka; Referees: Vojin Putnikovic (SRB), Michiel Zwart (NED)
18 May 2024; 17:45	Report	Stamm, Tkáč 1	Goals	three players 2	Bazeni Kantrida, Rijeka; Referees: Vojin Putnikovic (SRB), Michiel Zwart (NED)

=== Final ===
18 May 2024; 20:00	Report	Jug AO Dubrovnik (Croatia)	12–6	(Croatia) Primorje Erste Bank Rijeka	Bazeni Kantrida, Rijeka; Referees: Georgios Stavridis (GRE), Alessandro Severo (ITA)
18 May 2024; 20:00	Report	Score by quarters: 3–1, 1–1, 6–2, 2–2			Bazeni Kantrida, Rijeka; Referees: Georgios Stavridis (GRE), Alessandro Severo (ITA)
18 May 2024; 20:00	Report	Cabañas, Daube 3	Goals	Brubnjak, Kadivec 2	Bazeni Kantrida, Rijeka; Referees: Georgios Stavridis (GRE), Alessandro Severo (ITA)

2023–24 LEN Euro Cup Champions

Jug AO Dubrovnik
Second title

== See also ==
- 2023–24 LEN Champions League
- 2023–24 LEN Challenger Cup
- 2023 LEN Super Cup
- 2023–24 LEN Women's Champions League
- 2023–24 LEN Women's Euro Cup
- 2023–24 LEN Women's Challenger Cup
- 2023 LEN Women's Super Cup
