= CS Plebiscito Padova =

Italian water polo club

- Founded: 1984
- League: Serie A2 (men); Serie A1 (women)
- Based in: Padua, Italy
- Colors: White and red
- President: Lino Barbiero
- Head coach: Fabrizio Cattaruzzi (men); Stefano Posterivo (women)
- Championships: 1 Italian Cup (women)
- Website: https://www.news2001.it/padova/

CS Plebiscito Padova (Centro Sportivo del Plebiscito Padova) is an Italian professional water polo club based in Padua. Plebiscito Padova is the main water polo team in the city of Padua with men and women teams in the field.

== Men's team ==
The men's team founded in 1984 is currently playing in the Italian league water polo Series A2. As in previous seasons, is one of the few Italian clubs formed by 15/16 rose from Padua, from the youth sector.

== Women's team ==
The women's team plays in Serie A1, is one of the clubs on the national scene that boasts a first team formed by many athletes of the youth sector, which has led over the years to many Italian titles.

In the 2013-2014 season, the first team to enter the play-off series A1 finishing in fourth place in the regular season. In the semifinals the Paduan defeat the favored Horizon Catania and then lose the final against Imperia, graduating anyway vice champions Italy.

The March 8, 2015, Plebiscito Padova won for the first time in its history the Italian Cup, beating Messina.

== Honours ==
women

=== Domestic ===
Italian Cup

- Winners (1): 2014-15

=== European ===
Women's LEN Trophy

- Runners-up (1): 2014-15
- Winners (1): 2023-24
