= Da Veiga =

Da Veiga may refer to:

== Middle name ==
- Alberto da Veiga Guignard (1896–1962), Brazilian painter
- Francisco da Veiga Beirão (1841–1916), Portuguese politician
- Henrique da Veiga de Nápoles, Portuguese nobleman
- Henrique Esteves da Veiga de Nápoles (1438–1502), Portuguese nobleman
- João Esteves da Veiga de Nápoles (1397–1461), Portuguese nobleman

== Surname ==
- Alexandre Varela Da Veiga (born 1979), French record producer
- Alonso Pita da Veiga (born 1485/1490 – 1554), Spanish nobleman and military officer
- Estácio da Veiga (1828–1891), Portuguese archaeologist and writer
- Evaristo da Veiga (1799–1837), Brazilian poet, journalist, and politician
- Francisco Maria da Veiga, Portuguese judge
- Gabriel Pita da Veiga (1909–1993), Spanish admiral
- Lourenço da Veiga (born 1979), Portuguese auto racing driver
- Pimenta da Veiga (born 1947), former communications minister of Brazil
- Simão Luís da Veiga (1903–1959), bullfighting horseman
- Thomas-Steven Da Veiga (born 1995), French professional footballer
- Uriel da Veiga (born 1940), retired Brazilian footballer
