= Nápoles (surname) =

Nápoles (Portuguese for Naples) is a Portuguese and Hispanic surname that may refer to

- Anna María Nápoles, American behavioral epidemiologist and science administrator
- Gustavo Nápoles (born 1973), Mexican football player and manager
- Henrique da Veiga de Nápoles (1449–1520), Portuguese nobleman
- Henrique Esteves da Veiga de Nápoles (1438–1502), Portuguese nobleman
- Janet Lim-Napoles (born 1964), Filipino businesswoman
- Jerald Napoles (born 1983), Filipino theater actor and a comedian
- João Esteves da Veiga de Nápoles (1397–1461), Portuguese nobleman
- José Nápoles (1940–2019), Cuban boxer
- Leonardo Esteves de Nápoles (c. 1350 – 1421), Portuguese nobleman
- Maria Nápoles (born 1936), Portuguese fencer
- Sergio Nápoles (born 1989), Mexican association football player
- Yaisnier Nápoles (born 1987), Cuban association football player
- Yohan Leon Napoles (born 1995), Cuban volleyball player
- Yusiel Nápoles (born 1983), Cuban amateur boxer
