= Napolitano =

Napolitano (Modern Italian "Napoletano", Neapolitan: Nnapulitano, Slang: "Nablidon") is translated in English as Neapolitan. The word can refer to people from Napoli (Naples), their language, culture, in addition to being an Italian surname.

People with the surname:

- Andrew Napolitano (b. 1950), a former Superior Court judge and former legal analyst for Fox News Channel
- Angelina Napolitano (1882–1932), the first person in Canada to use the battered woman defence for murder
- Antonio Napolitano (1928–2014), an Italian film critic
- Antonio Napolitano (born 1999), an Argentine footballer
- Art Napolitano (b. 1956), an American soccer player
- Danilo Napolitano (b. 1981), an Italian cyclist
- Dominic "Sonny Black" Napolitano (1930–1981), a capo in the Bonanno crime family
- George Napolitano, a photographer
- Gian Gaspare Napolitano (1907–1966), an Italian journalist, screenwriter and film director
- Giorgio Napolitano (1925–2023), former President of the Italian Republic
- Grace Napolitano (b. 1936), an American politician, a Democratic member of the United States House of Representatives
- Janet Napolitano (b. 1957), former U.S. Secretary of Homeland Security, Arizona Governor, President of the University of California
- Joe Napolitano (1948–2016), an American film and television director
- Johnette Napolitano (b. 1957), an American musician, the lead singer, songwriter and bassist of Concrete Blonde
- Luca Napolitano (b. 1986), an Italian songwriter
- Luigi G. Napolitano (1928-1991), an Italian aerospace engineer
- Mario Napolitano (1910–1995), an Italian chess player
- Michael Napolitano, the Mayor of Cranston, Rhode Island
- Nicola Napolitano (1838–1863), Italian brigand
- Nicola Napolitano (b. 1983), an Italian footballer
- Norberto Napolitano (1950–2005), an Argentine musician better known as Pappo
- Paolo Maria Napolitano (1944–2016), Italian judge
- Peter Napolitano, known by his pseudonym Produce Pete (1945–2026), an American grocer, food writer, and television personality
- Raimundo Napolitano, an Italian painter of the Renaissance period
- Richard A. Napolitano (1916–1988), former Illinois state Representative
- Stefano Napolitano (b. 1995), Italian tennis player
- Umberto Napolitano (b. 1947), an Italian singer-songwriter

== See also ==
- Luigi G. Napolitano Award, a prize awarded by International Astronautical Congress
- Napoletano
- Napolitan
