= Napoletano =

Napoletano may refer to:

- Any person, thing or concept from Naples (Napoli), Italy
- Neapolitan language
- Neapolitan horse, the Napoletano breed of horse
- Carosello napoletano
- Giallo napoletano
- Mastino Napoletano
- ragù napoletano (ragù alla napoletana)
- Un turco napoletano

== People with the surname ==
- Filippo Napoletano (c. 1587-1589 - 1629), Italian artist
- Pasqualina Napoletano (b. 1949), Italian politician
- Daniele Napoletano (b. 1993), Italian footballer

== See also ==
- Napolitano (disambiguation)
- Neapolitan (disambiguation)
- Napoli (disambiguation)
- Naples (disambiguation)
- Neapoli (disambiguation)
