= 2025–26 European Aquatics Conference Cup quarterfinals =

- 2025–26

Tournament information
- Sport: Water polo
- Date: 20–22 March 2026
- Host(s): (Greece) Athens (Greece) Nea Smyrni
- Teams: 8 (from 10 countries)
- Website: Official website

Tournament statistics
- Matches played: 12

The 2025–26 European Aquatics Conference Cup quarterfinals is played between 20 and 22 March 2026 to determine the 4 teams advancing to the Final Four of the 2025–26 European Aquatics Conference Cup.

== Format ==
The 8 teams were place into two groups of four teams. In each group, teams will play against each other once in a round-robin format. The top two in each group advance to the next round.

Teams are ranked according to points (3 points for a win, 2 points for a penalty shootout win, 1 point for a penalty shootout loss, 0 points for a loss), and if tied on points, the following tiebreaking criteria are applied, in the order given, to determine the rankings:

- Points in head-to-head matches among tied teams;
- Goal difference in head-to-head matches among tied teams;
- Goals scored in head-to-head matches among tied teams;
- Goal difference in all group matches;
- Goals scored in all group matches.

== Draw ==
External videos
- 2025–26 European Aquatics Conference Cup quarterfinals – Draw
- Draw

The draw was on 2 March 2026 in Zagreb, Croatia. The draw started with, in order, pots 1 and 2 being drawn. The position for the team within the group would then be drawn (for the purpose of the schedule).

=== Seeding ===
The pots were decided by as follows:

- Pot 1 consisted of the group winners of the Conference Cup qualification round II
- Pot 2 consisted of the group runners-up of the Conference Cup qualification round II.

Pot 1
Team
(Greece) GS Apollon Smyrnis (H)
(Croatia) VK Mornar Split
(Hungary) Endo Plus SH
(Italy) CN Posillipo

Pot 2
Team
(Greece) Panionios GSS (H)
(Spain) Tenerife Echeyde
(Italy) De Akker Team
(Spain) Solartradex CN Mataró

=== Draw results ===
Group A
Pos	Team
A1	(Italy) CN Posillipo
A2	(Hungary) Endo Plus SH
A3	(Greece) Panionios GSS (H)
A4	(Spain) Tenerife Echeyde

Group B
Pos	Team
B1	(Croatia) VK Mornar Split
B2	(Greece) GS Apollon Smyrnis (H)
B3	(Spain) Solartradex CN Mataró
B4	(Italy) De Akker Team

== Groups ==
=== Group A ===
20–22 March 2026, Nea Smyrni, Greece.

Pos	Team	Pld	W	PSW	PSL	L	GF	GA	GD	Pts	Qualification	END	PAN	POS	TEN
1	(Hungary) Endo Plus SH	3	3	0	0	0	46	39	+7	9	Final Four	—	—	—	—
2	(Greece) Panionios GSS (H)	3	2	0	0	1	40	35	+5	6	Final Four	12–15	—	—	15–8
3	(Italy) CN Posillipo	3	1	0	0	2	41	41	0	3		12–15	12–13	—	—
4	(Spain) Tenerife Echeyde	3	0	0	0	3	36	48	−12	0		15–16	—	13–17	—

Source: European Aquatics Conference Cup
(H) Host

20 March 2026; 18:00	Report	CN Posillipo (Italy)	12–15	(Hungary) Endo Plus SH	Referees: Tomislav Copic (CRO), Veselin Miskovic (MNE)
20 March 2026; 18:00	Report	Score by quarters: 2–4, 4–6, 4–3, 2–2			Referees: Tomislav Copic (CRO), Veselin Miskovic (MNE)
20 March 2026; 18:00	Report	Maksimovic, Rocchino 3	Goals	Moskov 5	Referees: Tomislav Copic (CRO), Veselin Miskovic (MNE)

20 March 2026; 20:00	Report	Panionios GSS (Greece)	15–8	(Spain) Tenerife Echeyde	Referees: Rik Evers (NED), Emin Can Tanik (TUR)
20 March 2026; 20:00	Report	Score by quarters: 4–1, 2–4, 6–1, 3–2			Referees: Rik Evers (NED), Emin Can Tanik (TUR)
20 March 2026; 20:00	Report	Suzuki 5	Goals	Andión 3	Referees: Rik Evers (NED), Emin Can Tanik (TUR)

21 March 2026; 18:00	Report	CN Posillipo (Italy)	12–13	(Greece) Panionios GSS	Referees: Tomislav Copic (CRO), Emin Can Tanik (TUR)
21 March 2026; 18:00	Report	Score by quarters: 3–3, 2–3, 5–4, 2–3			Referees: Tomislav Copic (CRO), Emin Can Tanik (TUR)
21 March 2026; 18:00	Report	three players 3	Goals	Gounas 5	Referees: Tomislav Copic (CRO), Emin Can Tanik (TUR)

21 March 2026; 20:00	Report	Tenerife Echeyde (Spain)	15–16	(Hungary) Endo Plus SH	Referees: Rik Evers (NED), Veselin Miskovic (MNE)
21 March 2026; 20:00	Report	Score by quarters: 4–4, 4–4, 5–5, 2–3			Referees: Rik Evers (NED), Veselin Miskovic (MNE)
21 March 2026; 20:00	Report	Araya 5	Goals	Moskov 7	Referees: Rik Evers (NED), Veselin Miskovic (MNE)

22 March 2026; 11:30	Report	Tenerife Echeyde (Spain)	13–17	(Italy) CN Posillipo	Referees: Veselin Miskovic (MNE), Emin Can Tanik (TUR)
22 March 2026; 11:30	Report	Score by quarters: 3–9, 2–0, 4–5, 4–3			Referees: Veselin Miskovic (MNE), Emin Can Tanik (TUR)
22 March 2026; 11:30	Report	Araya 4	Goals	Cuccovillo 4	Referees: Veselin Miskovic (MNE), Emin Can Tanik (TUR)

22 March 2026; 13:30	Report	Panionios GSS (Greece)	12–15	(Hungary) Endo Plus SH	Referees: Rik Evers (NED), Tomislav Copic (CRO)
22 March 2026; 13:30	Report	Score by quarters: 2–6, 4–4, 5–5, 1–0			Referees: Rik Evers (NED), Tomislav Copic (CRO)
22 March 2026; 13:30	Report	Bitsakos 4	Goals	Moskov 5	Referees: Rik Evers (NED), Tomislav Copic (CRO)

=== Group B ===
20–22 March 2026, Athens, Greece.

Pos	Team	Pld	W	PSW	PSL	L	GF	GA	GD	Pts	Qualification	AKK	APO	MAT	MOR
1	(Italy) De Akker Team	3	2	0	0	1	41	44	−3	6 (Note: De Akker Team 14–11 GS Apollon Smyrnis)	Final Four	—	—	14–13	—
2	(Greece) GS Apollon Smyrnis (H)	3	2	0	0	1	43	33	+10	6	Final Four	11–14	—	15–10	17–9
3	(Spain) Solartradex CN Mataró	3	1	0	0	2	37	41	−4	3 (Note: Solartradex CN Mataró 14–12 VK Mornar Split)		—	—	—	—
4	(Croatia) VK Mornar Split	3	1	0	0	2	41	44	−3	3		20–13	—	12–14	—

Source: European Aquatics Conference Cup
(H) Host
Notes:

20 March 2026; 19:00	Report	De Akker Team (Italy)	14–13	(Spain) Solartradex CN Mataró	Referees: Mihai Balanescu (ROU), Gernot Haentschel (GER)
20 March 2026; 19:00	Report	Score by quarters: 3–4, 4–4, 4–1, 3–4			Referees: Mihai Balanescu (ROU), Gernot Haentschel (GER)
20 March 2026; 19:00	Report	three players 3	Goals	Bertran 4	Referees: Mihai Balanescu (ROU), Gernot Haentschel (GER)

20 March 2026; 21:00	Report	GS Apollon Smyrnis (Greece)	17–9	(Croatia) VK Mornar Split	Referees: Norbert Ercse (HUN), Vuk Milovic (SRB)
20 March 2026; 21:00	Report	Score by quarters: 4–3, 3–4, 4–0, 6–2			Referees: Norbert Ercse (HUN), Vuk Milovic (SRB)
20 March 2026; 21:00	Report	Bogdanovic 4	Goals	Akrap 3	Referees: Norbert Ercse (HUN), Vuk Milovic (SRB)

21 March 2026; 18:30	Report	VK Mornar Split (Croatia)	12–14	(Spain) Solartradex CN Mataró	Referees: Gernot Haentschel (GER), Vuk Milovic (SRB)
21 March 2026; 18:30	Report	Score by quarters: 2–7, 3–3, 4–3, 3–1			Referees: Gernot Haentschel (GER), Vuk Milovic (SRB)
21 March 2026; 18:30	Report	Zivkovic4	Goals	Aguirre 4	Referees: Gernot Haentschel (GER), Vuk Milovic (SRB)

21 March 2026; 20:30	Report	GS Apollon Smyrnis (Greece)	11–14	(Italy) De Akker Team	Referees: Mihai Balanescu (ROU), Norbert Ercse (HUN)
21 March 2026; 20:30	Report	Score by quarters: 4–2, 2–5, 1–3, 4–4			Referees: Mihai Balanescu (ROU), Norbert Ercse (HUN)
21 March 2026; 20:30	Report	Bogdanovic 4	Goals	Campopiano 5	Referees: Mihai Balanescu (ROU), Norbert Ercse (HUN)

22 March 2026; 09:30	Report	VK Mornar Split (Croatia)	20–13	(Italy) De Akker Team	Referees: Vuk Milovic (SRB), Gernot Haentschel (GER)
22 March 2026; 09:30	Report	Score by quarters: 5–5, 5–3, 5–3, 5–2			Referees: Vuk Milovic (SRB), Gernot Haentschel (GER)
22 March 2026; 09:30	Report	Dragas 4	Goals	Erdélyi 4	Referees: Vuk Milovic (SRB), Gernot Haentschel (GER)

22 March 2026; 11:30	Report	GS Apollon Smyrnis (Greece)	15–10	(Spain) Solartradex CN Mataró	Referees: Mihai Balanescu (ROU), Norbert Ercse (HUN)
22 March 2026; 11:30	Report	Score by quarters: 5–3, 2–2, 6–4, 2–1			Referees: Mihai Balanescu (ROU), Norbert Ercse (HUN)
22 March 2026; 11:30	Report	Bogdanovic, Daube 6	Goals	Gil Cedo 3	Referees: Mihai Balanescu (ROU), Norbert Ercse (HUN)

== See also ==
- 2025–26 European Aquatics Champions League
- 2025–26 European Aquatics Euro Cup
- 2025–26 European Aquatics Conference Cup
- 2025–26 European Aquatics Challenger Cup
- 2025 European Aquatics Super Cup
- 2025–26 European Aquatics Women's Champions League
- 2025–26 European Aquatics Women's Euro Cup
- 2025–26 European Aquatics Women's Conference Cup
- 2025–26 European Aquatics Women's Challenger Cup
- 2025 European Aquatics Women's Super Cup

Reference
Matchday 1
Matchday 2
Matchday 3
