= Nápoles (disambiguation) =

Nápoles is an ancient Portuguese family. Nápoles or Napoles may also refer to

- Nápoles (surname)
- Colonia Nápoles in Mexico City
- Nápoles (Mexico City Metrobús), a BRT station in Mexico City
- Hacienda Nápoles in Colombia
