= 2025–26 European Aquatics Conference Cup qualification round II =

- 2025–26

Tournament information
- Sport: Water polo
- Date: 19–22 February 2026
- Host(s): (Germany) Potsdam (Croatia) Split (France) Montpellier (Italy) Naples
- Teams: 18 (from 10 countries)
- Website: Official website

Tournament statistics
- Matches played: 32

The 2025–26 European Aquatics Conference Cup qualification round I is played between 19 and 22 February 2026 to determine the 8 teams advancing to the Quarterfinals of the 2025–26 European Aquatics Conference Cup.

== Format ==
The 18 teams were place into four groups of five or four teams. In each group, teams will play against each other once in a round-robin format. The top two in each group advance to the next round.

Teams are ranked according to points (3 points for a win, 2 points for a penalty shootout win, 1 point for a penalty shootout loss, 0 points for a loss), and if tied on points, the following tiebreaking criteria are applied, in the order given, to determine the rankings:

- Points in head-to-head matches among tied teams;
- Goal difference in head-to-head matches among tied teams;
- Goals scored in head-to-head matches among tied teams;
- Goal difference in all group matches;
- Goals scored in all group matches.

== Draw ==
External videos
- 2025–26 European Aquatics Conference Cup qualification round II – Draw
- Draw

The draw was on 19 November 2025 in Zagreb, Croatia. The clubs that in the same group in the previous round (in both Euro and Conference Cup) could not be drawn against each other. (H) indicates which clubs is hosting a group.

=== Seeding ===
The pots were decided by as follows

- Pot 1 consisted of the second and third place teams in Euro Cup qualification
- Pot 2 consisted of the fourth place teams in Euro Cup qualification
- Pot 3 consisted of the group winners of the Conference Cup qualification round I
- Pot 4 consisted of the group runners-up of the Conference Cup qualification round I.

Key to colours
Teams advancing to Quarterfinals

Pot 1
Team
(Greece) GS Apollon Smyrnis
(Georgia (country)) A-Polo Sport Management
(Serbia) BVK Crvena zvezda
(Romania) CS Rapid București

Pot 2
Team
(Netherlands) ZV De Zaan
(France) Montpellier Water Polo (H)
(Georgia (country)) WPC Dinamo Tbilisi
(Germany) OSC Potsdam (H)

Pot 3
Team
(Italy) CN Posillipo (H)
(Greece) Panionios GSS
(Croatia) VK Mornar Split (H)
(Italy) De Akker Team
(Croatia) VK Primorje EB

Pot 4
Team
(Hungary) Endo Plus SH
(Spain) Tenerife Echeyde
(France) Sète Natation
(Serbia) VK Partizan
(Spain) Solartradex CN Mataró

== Groups ==
=== Group A ===
20–22 February 2026, Potsdam, Germany.

Pos	Team	Pld	W	PSW	PSL	L	GF	GA	GD	Pts	Qualification	APO	PAN	PAR	POT
1	(Greece) GS Apollon Smyrnis	3	3	0	0	0	54	37	+17	9	Quarterfinals	—	—	—	—
2	(Greece) Panionios GSS	3	2	0	0	1	47	35	+12	6	Quarterfinals	13–15	—	—	—
3	(Serbia) VK Partizan	3	1	0	0	2	43	39	+4	3		16–20	11–13	—	—
4	(Germany) OSC Potsdam (H)	3	0	0	0	3	23	56	−33	0		8–19	9–21	6–16	—

Source: European Aquatics Conference Cup
(H) Host

20 February 2026; 17:00	Report	VK Partizan (Serbia)	16–20	(Greece) GS Apollon Smyrnis	Sportpark Luftschiffhafen, Potsdam; Referees: Sergio Turnes Jimenez (ESP), Gregory Courbin (FRA)
20 February 2026; 17:00	Report	Score by quarters: 6–4, 3–5, 5–7, 2–4			Sportpark Luftschiffhafen, Potsdam; Referees: Sergio Turnes Jimenez (ESP), Gregory Courbin (FRA)
20 February 2026; 17:00	Report	Đokanović 4	Goals	Daube 9	Sportpark Luftschiffhafen, Potsdam; Referees: Sergio Turnes Jimenez (ESP), Gregory Courbin (FRA)

20 February 2026; 19:00	Report	OSC Potsdam (Germany)	9–21	(Greece) Panionios GSS	Sportpark Luftschiffhafen, Potsdam; Referees: Maro Savinovic (CRO), Soma Kovacs (HUN)
20 February 2026; 19:00	Report	Score by quarters: 2–5, 2–6, 3–5, 2–5			Sportpark Luftschiffhafen, Potsdam; Referees: Maro Savinovic (CRO), Soma Kovacs (HUN)
20 February 2026; 19:00	Report	Hofmann 4	Goals	Bitsakos 5	Sportpark Luftschiffhafen, Potsdam; Referees: Maro Savinovic (CRO), Soma Kovacs (HUN)

21 February 2026; 15:00	Report	VK Partizan (Serbia)	11–13	(Greece) Panionios GSS	Sportpark Luftschiffhafen, Potsdam; Referees: Soma Kovacs (HUN), Sergio Turnes Jimenez (ESP)
21 February 2026; 15:00	Report	Score by quarters: 2–3, 4–2, 3–5, 2–3			Sportpark Luftschiffhafen, Potsdam; Referees: Soma Kovacs (HUN), Sergio Turnes Jimenez (ESP)
21 February 2026; 15:00	Report	three players 3	Goals	Gounas 6	Sportpark Luftschiffhafen, Potsdam; Referees: Soma Kovacs (HUN), Sergio Turnes Jimenez (ESP)

21 February 2026; 17:00	Report	OSC Potsdam (Germany)	8–19	(Greece) GS Apollon Smyrnis	Sportpark Luftschiffhafen, Potsdam; Referees: Maro Savinovic (CRO), Gregory Courbin (FRA)
21 February 2026; 17:00	Report	Score by quarters: 2–4, 2–6, 1–6, 3–3			Sportpark Luftschiffhafen, Potsdam; Referees: Maro Savinovic (CRO), Gregory Courbin (FRA)
21 February 2026; 17:00	Report	Hofmann 4	Goals	Daube 5	Sportpark Luftschiffhafen, Potsdam; Referees: Maro Savinovic (CRO), Gregory Courbin (FRA)

22 February 2026; 10:00	Report	Panionios GSS (Greece)	13–15	(Greece) GS Apollon Smyrnis	Sportpark Luftschiffhafen, Potsdam; Referees: Sergio Turnes Jimenez (ESP), Maro Savinovic (CRO)
22 February 2026; 10:00	Report	Score by quarters: 3–4, 3–3, 4–5, 3–3			Sportpark Luftschiffhafen, Potsdam; Referees: Sergio Turnes Jimenez (ESP), Maro Savinovic (CRO)
22 February 2026; 10:00	Report	Mourikis 6	Goals	Daube 4	Sportpark Luftschiffhafen, Potsdam; Referees: Sergio Turnes Jimenez (ESP), Maro Savinovic (CRO)

22 February 2026; 12:00	Report	OSC Potsdam (Germany)	6–16	(Serbia) VK Partizan	Sportpark Luftschiffhafen, Potsdam; Referees: Gregory Courbin (FRA), Soma Kovacs (HUN)
22 February 2026; 12:00	Report	Score by quarters: 1–4, 3–5, 1–5, 1–2			Sportpark Luftschiffhafen, Potsdam; Referees: Gregory Courbin (FRA), Soma Kovacs (HUN)
22 February 2026; 12:00	Report	Hofmann 3	Goals	Đokanović 3	Sportpark Luftschiffhafen, Potsdam; Referees: Gregory Courbin (FRA), Soma Kovacs (HUN)

=== Group B ===
20–22 February 2026, Split, Croatia.

Pos	Team	Pld	W	PSW	PSL	L	GF	GA	GD	Pts	Qualification	MOR	TEN	ZDZ	RAP
1	(Croatia) VK Mornar Split (H)	3	2	1	0	0	47	34	+13	8	Quarterfinals	—	—	19–18 (Note: Match ended 12–12. VK Mornar Split won 7–6 on penalties.)	17–9
2	(Spain) Tenerife Echeyde	3	2	0	0	1	45	44	+1	6	Quarterfinals	13–18	—	—	—
3	(Netherlands) ZV De Zaan	3	1	0	1	1	41	40	+1	4		—	12–15	—	17–13
4	(Romania) CS Rapid București	3	0	0	0	3	36	51	−15	0		—	14–17	—	—

Source: European Aquatics Conference Cup
(H) Host

20 February 2026; 18:45	Report	CS Rapid București (Romania)	14–17	(Spain) Tenerife Echeyde	Stari bazen, Split; Referees: Mirko Schiavo (ITA), Rok Vehovec (SLO)
20 February 2026; 18:45	Report	Score by quarters: 3–2, 5–3, 3–7, 3–5			Stari bazen, Split; Referees: Mirko Schiavo (ITA), Rok Vehovec (SLO)
20 February 2026; 18:45	Report	Vrbnjak 5	Goals	Gorria 5	Stari bazen, Split; Referees: Mirko Schiavo (ITA), Rok Vehovec (SLO)

20 February 2026; 20:30	Report	VK Mornar Split (Croatia)	19–18 (PSO)	(Netherlands) ZV De Zaan	Stari bazen, Split; Referees: Levan Berishvili (GEO), Miroslav Mijanovic (MNE)
20 February 2026; 20:30	Report	Score by quarters: 3–3, 4–2, 1–4, 4–3 PSO: 7–6			Stari bazen, Split; Referees: Levan Berishvili (GEO), Miroslav Mijanovic (MNE)
20 February 2026; 20:30	Report	Stojanac 3	Goals	Lucas 5	Stari bazen, Split; Referees: Levan Berishvili (GEO), Miroslav Mijanovic (MNE)

21 February 2026; 18:00	Report	ZV De Zaan (Netherlands)	17–13	(Romania) CS Rapid București	Stari bazen, Split; Referees: Mirko Schiavo (ITA), Miroslav Mijanovic (MNE)
21 February 2026; 18:00	Report	Score by quarters: 4–4, 5–5, 5–1, 3–3			Stari bazen, Split; Referees: Mirko Schiavo (ITA), Miroslav Mijanovic (MNE)
21 February 2026; 18:00	Report	Rempt 5	Goals	Goreta 4	Stari bazen, Split; Referees: Mirko Schiavo (ITA), Miroslav Mijanovic (MNE)

21 February 2026; 19:45	Report	Tenerife Echeyde (Spain)	13–18	(Croatia) VK Mornar Split	Stari bazen, Split; Referees: Rok Vehovec (SLO), Levan Berishvili (GEO)
21 February 2026; 19:45	Report	Score by quarters: 4–4, 4–4, 3–5, 2–5			Stari bazen, Split; Referees: Rok Vehovec (SLO), Levan Berishvili (GEO)
21 February 2026; 19:45	Report	Araya 5	Goals	Živković 6	Stari bazen, Split; Referees: Rok Vehovec (SLO), Levan Berishvili (GEO)

22 February 2026; 09:45	Report	ZV De Zaan (Netherlands)	12–15	(Spain) Tenerife Echeyde	Stari bazen, Split; Referees: Levan Berishvili (GEO), Mirko Schiavo (ITA)
22 February 2026; 09:45	Report	Score by quarters: 3–3, 4–5, 1–4, 4–3			Stari bazen, Split; Referees: Levan Berishvili (GEO), Mirko Schiavo (ITA)
22 February 2026; 09:45	Report	Garancsy 5	Goals	Gorria 6	Stari bazen, Split; Referees: Levan Berishvili (GEO), Mirko Schiavo (ITA)

22 February 2026; 11:00	Report	VK Mornar Split (Croatia)	17–9	(Romania) CS Rapid București	Stari bazen, Split; Referees: Rok Vehovec (SLO), Miroslav Mijanovic (MNE)
22 February 2026; 11:00	Report	Score by quarters: 5–1, 4–4, 2–2, 6–2			Stari bazen, Split; Referees: Rok Vehovec (SLO), Miroslav Mijanovic (MNE)
22 February 2026; 11:00	Report	Hrvatic 5	Goals	three players 2	Stari bazen, Split; Referees: Rok Vehovec (SLO), Miroslav Mijanovic (MNE)

=== Group C ===
19–22 February 2026, Montpellier, France.

Pos	Team	Pld	W	PSW	PSL	L	GF	GA	GD	Pts	Qualification	END	AKK	MAN	PRI	MON
1	(Hungary) Endo Plus SH	4	3	1	0	0	57	41	+16	11	Quarterfinals	—	15–10	20–19 (Note: Match ended 14–14. Endo Plus SH won 6–5 on penalties.)	—	—
2	(Italy) De Akker Team	4	2	1	0	1	64	50	+14	8	Quarterfinals	—	—	—	—	—
3	(Georgia (country)) A-Polo Sport Management	4	1	1	2	0	59	52	+7	7		—	15–16 (Note: Match ended 12–12. De Akker Team won 3–4 on penalties.)	—	23–22 (Note: Match ended 13–13. A-Polo Sport Management won 10–9 on penalties.)	—
4	(Croatia) VK Primorje EB	4	1	0	1	2	57	56	+1	4		9–10	14–17	—	—	—
5	(France) Montpellier Water Polo (H)	4	0	0	0	4	46	84	−38	0		8–18	9–25	13–20	16–21	—

Source: European Aquatics Conference Cup
(H) Host

19 February 2026; 18:30	Report	Endo Plus SH (Hungary)	20–19 (PSO)	(Georgia (country)) A-Polo Sport Management	Olympic Swimming Pool, Montpellier; Referees: Lazar Andjelic (SRB), Mihnea Alexandrescu (ROU)
19 February 2026; 18:30	Report	Score by quarters: 2–3, 3–5, 4–3, 5–3 PSO: 6–4			Olympic Swimming Pool, Montpellier; Referees: Lazar Andjelic (SRB), Mihnea Alexandrescu (ROU)
19 February 2026; 18:30	Report	Moskov 5	Goals	four players 3	Olympic Swimming Pool, Montpellier; Referees: Lazar Andjelic (SRB), Mihnea Alexandrescu (ROU)

19 February 2026; 20:30	Report	Montpellier Water Polo (France)	9–25	(Italy) De Akker Team	Olympic Swimming Pool, Montpellier; Referees: Peter de Jong (NED), Robert Horvath (SVK)
19 February 2026; 20:30	Report	Score by quarters: 0–8, 4–4, 4–7, 1–6			Olympic Swimming Pool, Montpellier; Referees: Peter de Jong (NED), Robert Horvath (SVK)
19 February 2026; 20:30	Report	Mustur, Stojanovic 4	Goals	four players 4	Olympic Swimming Pool, Montpellier; Referees: Peter de Jong (NED), Robert Horvath (SVK)

20 February 2026; 18:30	Report	A-Polo Sport Management (Georgia (country))	23–22 (PSO)	(Croatia) VK Primorje EB	Olympic Swimming Pool, Montpellier; Referees: Robert Horvath (SVK), Lazar Andjelic (SRB)
20 February 2026; 18:30	Report	Score by quarters: 2–2, 3–2, 3–5, 5–4 PSO: 10–9			Olympic Swimming Pool, Montpellier; Referees: Robert Horvath (SVK), Lazar Andjelic (SRB)
20 February 2026; 18:30	Report	Rogač 4	Goals	Brubnjak 4	Olympic Swimming Pool, Montpellier; Referees: Robert Horvath (SVK), Lazar Andjelic (SRB)

20 February 2026; 20:30	Report	Montpellier Water Polo (France)	8–18	(Hungary) Endo Plus SH	Olympic Swimming Pool, Montpellier; Referees: Mihnea Alexandrescu (ROU), Peter de Jong (NED)
20 February 2026; 20:30	Report	Score by quarters: 1–5, 5–6, 1–4, 1–3			Olympic Swimming Pool, Montpellier; Referees: Mihnea Alexandrescu (ROU), Peter de Jong (NED)
20 February 2026; 20:30	Report	Mustur, Stojanovic 4	Goals	Ekler, Szépfalvi 3	Olympic Swimming Pool, Montpellier; Referees: Mihnea Alexandrescu (ROU), Peter de Jong (NED)

21 February 2026; 09:30	Report	A-Polo Sport Management (Georgia (country))	15–16 (PSO)	(Italy) De Akker Team	Olympic Swimming Pool, Montpellier; Referees: Robert Horvath (SVK), Mihnea Alexandrescu (ROU)
21 February 2026; 09:30	Report	Score by quarters: 5–3, 2–4, 3–1, 2–4 PSO: 3–4			Olympic Swimming Pool, Montpellier; Referees: Robert Horvath (SVK), Mihnea Alexandrescu (ROU)
21 February 2026; 09:30	Report	Alekseev, Vuksanović 3	Goals	Bragantini 3	Olympic Swimming Pool, Montpellier; Referees: Robert Horvath (SVK), Mihnea Alexandrescu (ROU)

21 February 2026; 11:30	Report	VK Primorje EB (Croatia)	9–10	(Hungary) Endo Plus SH	Olympic Swimming Pool, Montpellier; Referees: Lazar Andjelic (SRB), Peter de Jong (NED)
21 February 2026; 11:30	Report	Score by quarters: 2–2, 5–3, 0–2, 2–3			Olympic Swimming Pool, Montpellier; Referees: Lazar Andjelic (SRB), Peter de Jong (NED)
21 February 2026; 11:30	Report	Dujmić 3	Goals	Moskov 5	Olympic Swimming Pool, Montpellier; Referees: Lazar Andjelic (SRB), Peter de Jong (NED)

21 February 2026; 19:00	Report	Montpellier Water Polo (France)	13–20	(Georgia (country)) A-Polo Sport Management	Olympic Swimming Pool, Montpellier; Referees: Peter de Jong (NED), Robert Horvath (SVK)
21 February 2026; 19:00	Report	Score by quarters: 3–5, 3–6, 4–4, 3–5			Olympic Swimming Pool, Montpellier; Referees: Peter de Jong (NED), Robert Horvath (SVK)
21 February 2026; 19:00	Report	Mustur, Palantal 4	Goals	Alekseev 5	Olympic Swimming Pool, Montpellier; Referees: Peter de Jong (NED), Robert Horvath (SVK)

21 February 2026; 21:00	Report	VK Primorje EB (Croatia)	14–17	(Italy) De Akker Team	Olympic Swimming Pool, Montpellier; Referees: Mihnea Alexandrescu (ROU), Lazar Andjelic (SRB)
21 February 2026; 21:00	Report	Score by quarters: 6–6, 0–4, 4–3, 4–4			Olympic Swimming Pool, Montpellier; Referees: Mihnea Alexandrescu (ROU), Lazar Andjelic (SRB)
21 February 2026; 21:00	Report	Brubnjak 3	Goals	Bragantini 4	Olympic Swimming Pool, Montpellier; Referees: Mihnea Alexandrescu (ROU), Lazar Andjelic (SRB)

22 February 2026; 10:00	Report	Endo Plus SH (Hungary)	15–10	(Italy) De Akker Team	Olympic Swimming Pool, Montpellier; Referees: Lazar Andjelic (SRB), Peter de Jong (NED)
22 February 2026; 10:00	Report	Score by quarters: 5–2, 4–1, 3–4, 3–3			Olympic Swimming Pool, Montpellier; Referees: Lazar Andjelic (SRB), Peter de Jong (NED)
22 February 2026; 10:00	Report	Moskov 4	Goals	Di Murro 3	Olympic Swimming Pool, Montpellier; Referees: Lazar Andjelic (SRB), Peter de Jong (NED)

22 February 2026; 12:00	Report	Montpellier Water Polo (France)	16–21	(Croatia) VK Primorje EB	Olympic Swimming Pool, Montpellier; Referees: Robert Horvath (SVK), Mihnea Alexandrescu (ROU)
22 February 2026; 12:00	Report	Score by quarters: 1–6, 2–8, 6–3, 7–4			Olympic Swimming Pool, Montpellier; Referees: Robert Horvath (SVK), Mihnea Alexandrescu (ROU)
22 February 2026; 12:00	Report	three players 3	Goals	Crippa 4	Olympic Swimming Pool, Montpellier; Referees: Robert Horvath (SVK), Mihnea Alexandrescu (ROU)

=== Group D ===
19–22 February 2026, Naples, Italy.

Pos	Team	Pld	W	PSW	PSL	L	GF	GA	GD	Pts	Qualification	POS	MAT	CRV	SET	DIN
1	(Italy) CN Posillipo (H)	4	4	0	0	0	51	31	+20	12	Quarterfinals	—	12–10	12–4	14–9	13–8
2	(Spain) Solartradex CN Mataró	4	3	0	0	1	58	35	+23	9	Quarterfinals	—	—	—	22–7	—
3	(Serbia) BVK Crvena zvezda	4	1	1	0	2	32	40	−8	5		—	7–9	—	14–13 (Note: Match ended 10–10. BVK Crvena zvezda won 4–3 on penalties.)	11–9
4	(France) Sète Natation	4	1	0	1	2	42	60	−18	4		—	—	—	—	—
5	(Georgia (country)) WPC Dinamo Tbilisi	4	0	0	0	4	40	57	−17	0		—	9–17	—	14–16	—

Source: European Aquatics Conference Cup
(H) Host

19 February 2026; 19:00	Report	CN Posillipo (Italy)	13–8	(Georgia (country)) WPC Dinamo Tbilisi	Piscina Felice Scandone, Naples; Referees: Alexandros Chatzigoulas (GRE), Canberk Durak (TUR)
19 February 2026; 19:00	Report	Score by quarters: 3–1, 5–1, 1–3, 4–3			Piscina Felice Scandone, Naples; Referees: Alexandros Chatzigoulas (GRE), Canberk Durak (TUR)
19 February 2026; 19:00	Report	Cuccovillo 3	Goals	Tkeshelashvili 4	Piscina Felice Scandone, Naples; Referees: Alexandros Chatzigoulas (GRE), Canberk Durak (TUR)

19 February 2026; 21:00	Report	BVK Crvena zvezda (Serbia)	14–13 (PSO)	(France) Sète Natation	Piscina Felice Scandone, Naples; Referees: Tobias Laufer (GER), Massimo Castrilli (SUI)
19 February 2026; 21:00	Report	Score by quarters: 3–2, 2–2, 3–2, 2–4 PSO: 4–3			Piscina Felice Scandone, Naples; Referees: Tobias Laufer (GER), Massimo Castrilli (SUI)
19 February 2026; 21:00	Report	two players 2	Goals	Sauton 4	Piscina Felice Scandone, Naples; Referees: Tobias Laufer (GER), Massimo Castrilli (SUI)

20 February 2026; 19:00	Report	BVK Crvena zvezda (Serbia)	7–9	(Spain) Solartradex CN Mataró	Piscina Felice Scandone, Naples; Referees: Canberk Durak (TUR), Massimo Castrilli (SUI)
20 February 2026; 19:00	Report	Score by quarters: 1–1, 1–0, 3–3, 2–5			Piscina Felice Scandone, Naples; Referees: Canberk Durak (TUR), Massimo Castrilli (SUI)
20 February 2026; 19:00	Report	Radović 2	Goals	Flaqué Muela, Gil Cedo 2	Piscina Felice Scandone, Naples; Referees: Canberk Durak (TUR), Massimo Castrilli (SUI)

20 February 2026; 21:00	Report	CN Posillipo (Italy)	14–9	(France) Sète Natation	Piscina Felice Scandone, Naples; Referees: Tobias Laufer (GER), Alexandros Chatzigoulas (GRE)
20 February 2026; 21:00	Report	Score by quarters: 5–2, 4–2, 3–2, 2–3			Piscina Felice Scandone, Naples; Referees: Tobias Laufer (GER), Alexandros Chatzigoulas (GRE)
20 February 2026; 21:00	Report	Renzuto, Rocchino 3	Goals	Tomic 6	Piscina Felice Scandone, Naples; Referees: Tobias Laufer (GER), Alexandros Chatzigoulas (GRE)

21 February 2026; 09:30	Report	BVK Crvena zvezda (Serbia)	11–9	(Georgia (country)) WPC Dinamo Tbilisi	Piscina Felice Scandone, Naples; Referees: Alexandros Chatzigoulas (GRE), Massimo Castrilli (SUI)
21 February 2026; 09:30	Report	Score by quarters: 4–1, 2–4, 3–3, 2–1			Piscina Felice Scandone, Naples; Referees: Alexandros Chatzigoulas (GRE), Massimo Castrilli (SUI)
21 February 2026; 09:30	Report	Gajić 6	Goals	Averka 4	Piscina Felice Scandone, Naples; Referees: Alexandros Chatzigoulas (GRE), Massimo Castrilli (SUI)

21 February 2026; 11:30	Report	Solartradex CN Mataró (Spain)	22–7	(France) Sète Natation	Piscina Felice Scandone, Naples; Referees: Tobias Laufer (GER), Canberk Durak (TUR)
21 February 2026; 11:30	Report	Score by quarters: 6–2, 6–2, 6–1, 4–2			Piscina Felice Scandone, Naples; Referees: Tobias Laufer (GER), Canberk Durak (TUR)
21 February 2026; 11:30	Report	Aguirre 6	Goals	Radojević 3	Piscina Felice Scandone, Naples; Referees: Tobias Laufer (GER), Canberk Durak (TUR)

21 February 2026; 18:30	Report	CN Posillipo (Italy)	12–4	(Serbia) BVK Crvena zvezda	Piscina Felice Scandone, Naples; Referees: Massimo Castrilli (SUI), Tobias Laufer (GER)
21 February 2026; 18:30	Report	Score by quarters: 2–1, 5–2, 4–0, 1–1			Piscina Felice Scandone, Naples; Referees: Massimo Castrilli (SUI), Tobias Laufer (GER)
21 February 2026; 18:30	Report	Bertoli 4	Goals	Gajić 2	Piscina Felice Scandone, Naples; Referees: Massimo Castrilli (SUI), Tobias Laufer (GER)

21 February 2026; 20:30	Report	WPC Dinamo Tbilisi (Georgia (country))	9–17	(Spain) Solartradex CN Mataró	Piscina Felice Scandone, Naples; Referees: Canberk Durak (TUR), Alexandros Chatzigoulas (GRE)
21 February 2026; 20:30	Report	Score by quarters: 1–2, 1–6, 5–4, 2–5			Piscina Felice Scandone, Naples; Referees: Canberk Durak (TUR), Alexandros Chatzigoulas (GRE)
21 February 2026; 20:30	Report	Bucan 4	Goals	Rodríguez 4	Piscina Felice Scandone, Naples; Referees: Canberk Durak (TUR), Alexandros Chatzigoulas (GRE)

22 February 2026; 09:30	Report	WPC Dinamo Tbilisi (Georgia (country))	14–16	(France) Sète Natation	Piscina Felice Scandone, Naples; Referees: Tobias Laufer (GER), Canberk Durak (TUR)
22 February 2026; 09:30	Report	Score by quarters: 4–2, 4–2, 4–7, 2–5			Piscina Felice Scandone, Naples; Referees: Tobias Laufer (GER), Canberk Durak (TUR)
22 February 2026; 09:30	Report	Tkeshelashvili 5	Goals	Tomic 4	Piscina Felice Scandone, Naples; Referees: Tobias Laufer (GER), Canberk Durak (TUR)

22 February 2026; 11:30	Report	CN Posillipo (Italy)	12–10	(Spain) Solartradex CN Mataró	Piscina Felice Scandone, Naples; Attendance: 400; Referees: Alexandros Chatzigoulas (GRE), Massimo Castrilli (SUI)
22 February 2026; 11:30	Report	Score by quarters: 1–3, 4–1, 4–3, 3–3			Piscina Felice Scandone, Naples; Attendance: 400; Referees: Alexandros Chatzigoulas (GRE), Massimo Castrilli (SUI)
22 February 2026; 11:30	Report	Renzuto 5	Goals	three players 2	Piscina Felice Scandone, Naples; Attendance: 400; Referees: Alexandros Chatzigoulas (GRE), Massimo Castrilli (SUI)

== See also ==
- 2025–26 European Aquatics Champions League
- 2025–26 European Aquatics Euro Cup
- 2025–26 European Aquatics Conference Cup
- 2025–26 European Aquatics Challenger Cup
- 2025 European Aquatics Super Cup
- 2025–26 European Aquatics Women's Champions League
- 2025–26 European Aquatics Women's Euro Cup
- 2025–26 European Aquatics Women's Conference Cup
- 2025–26 European Aquatics Women's Challenger Cup
- 2025 European Aquatics Women's Super Cup

Reference
Matchday 1
Matchday 2
Matchday 3
Matchday 4
