= Naples railway station =

Naples railway station or Naples station may refer to:

== Italy ==
- Napoli Afragola railway station, a high-speed railway station near Naples
- Napoli Centrale railway station, the main railway station in Naples
- Napoli Centro Direzionale railway station, a Circumvesuviana commuter railway station in Naples
- Napoli Garibaldi railway station, a Circumvesuviana commuter railway station in Naples
- Napoli Gianturco railway station, a Naples Metropolitan commuter railway station
- Napoli Mergellina railway station, a major passenger station in Naples
- Napoli Piazza Amedeo station, a Naples Metropolitan commuter railway station
- Napoli Porta Nolana railway station, the main Circumvesuviana commuter railway terminus in Naples
- Napoli Piazza Garibaldi railway station, a Naples Metropolitan commuter railway station
- Napoli San Giovanni–Barra railway station, a Naples Metropolitan commuter railway terminus

== United States ==
- Naples Seaboard Air Line Railway Station, a historic railroad depot in Naples, Florida

== See also ==
- Naples (disambiguation)
- Napoli (disambiguation)
