= 2025–26 European Aquatics Conference Cup Final Four =

Women's water polo competition

Tournament details
- Host country: Greece
- Venue: 1 (in 1 host city)
- Dates: 2–3 May
- Teams: 4

Final positions
- Champions: (Italy) De Akker Team (1st title)
- Runners-up: (Hungary) Endo Plus SH
- Third place: (Greece) GS Apollon Smyrnis
- Fourth place: (Greece) Panionios GSS

Tournament statistics
- Matches played: 4
- Goals scored: 112 (28 per match)
- Top scorer: (Montenegro) Nikola Moskov (9 goals)

The 2025–26 European Aquatics Conference Cup Final Four was played on 2 and 3 May 2026 to determine the champion of the 2025–26 European Aquatics Conference Cup.

== Venue ==
The Final Four tournament was held at the Restio Swimming Pool in Athens.

== Qualified teams ==
Team	Participations (bold indicates winners)
(Greece) GS Apollon Smyrnis	None
(Greece) Panionios GSS	None
(Hungary) Endo Plus SH	None
(Italy) De Akker Team	None

== Referees ==
These referees were chosen for the Final Four.

Referees
Croatia	Jakov Blaskovic
France	Julien Bourges
Serbia	Ivan Rakovic
Spain	Juan Carlos Colominas

== Bracket ==
Semi-finals
**(Hungary) Endo Plus SH**	**16**
(Greece) GS Apollon Smyrnis	12
**(Italy) De Akker Team**	**13**
(Greece) Panionios GSS	12

Final
(Hungary) Endo Plus SH	14
**(Italy) De Akker Team**	**17**
Third place
**(Greece) GS Apollon Smyrnis**	**15**
(Greece) Panionios GSS	13

=== Semifinals ===
2 May 2026; 19:00	Report	**Endo Plus SH** (Hungary)	**16**–12	(Greece) GS Apollon Smyrnis	Restio Swimming Pool, Athens; Referees: Ivan Rakovic (SRB), Julien Bourges (FRA)
2 May 2026; 19:00	Report	Score by quarters: **4**–2, **5**–4, **4**–3, 3–3			Restio Swimming Pool, Athens; Referees: Ivan Rakovic (SRB), Julien Bourges (FRA)
2 May 2026; 19:00	Report	Moskov, Vadovics 4	**Goals**	Bogdanović, Solanakis 2	Restio Swimming Pool, Athens; Referees: Ivan Rakovic (SRB), Julien Bourges (FRA)

2 May 2026; 21:15	Report	**De Akker Team** (Italy)	**13**–12	(Greece) Panionios GSS	Restio Swimming Pool, Athens; Referees: Jakov Blaskovic (CRO), Juan Carlos Ezponda Colominas (ESP)
2 May 2026; 21:15	Report	Score by quarters: 3–**4**, 2–2, 3–3, **4**–2			Restio Swimming Pool, Athens; Referees: Jakov Blaskovic (CRO), Juan Carlos Ezponda Colominas (ESP)
2 May 2026; 21:15	Report	Campopiano 5	**Goals**	Gounas 5	Restio Swimming Pool, Athens; Referees: Jakov Blaskovic (CRO), Juan Carlos Ezponda Colominas (ESP)

=== Third place game ===
3 May 2026; 18:30	Report	**GS Apollon Smyrnis** (Greece)	**15**–13	(Greece) Panionios GSS	Restio Swimming Pool, Athens; Referees: Julien Bourges (FRA), Juan Carlos Colominas Ezponda (ESP)
3 May 2026; 18:30	Report	Score by quarters: 4–**6**, 3–3, **6**–2, 2–2			Restio Swimming Pool, Athens; Referees: Julien Bourges (FRA), Juan Carlos Colominas Ezponda (ESP)
3 May 2026; 18:30	Report	Gardikas 4	**Goals**	Bitsakos, Gounas 3	Restio Swimming Pool, Athens; Referees: Julien Bourges (FRA), Juan Carlos Colominas Ezponda (ESP)

=== Final ===
3 May 2026; 21:00	Report	Endo Plus SH (Hungary)	14–**17**	(Italy) **De Akker Team**	Restio Swimming Pool, Athens; Referees: Ivan Rakovic (SRB), Jakov Blaskovic (CRO)
3 May 2026; 21:00	Report	Score by quarters: 4–4, 4–4, 3–**4**, 3–**5**			Restio Swimming Pool, Athens; Referees: Ivan Rakovic (SRB), Jakov Blaskovic (CRO)
3 May 2026; 21:00	Report	Moskov 5	**Goals**	Milaković, Lucci 4	Restio Swimming Pool, Athens; Referees: Ivan Rakovic (SRB), Jakov Blaskovic (CRO)

2025–26 European Aquatics Conference Cup Champions

**De Akker Team**
First title

== See also ==
- 2025–26 European Aquatics Champions League
- 2025–26 European Aquatics Euro Cup
- 2025–26 European Aquatics Conference Cup
- 2025–26 European Aquatics Challenger Cup
- 2025 European Aquatics Super Cup
- 2025–26 European Aquatics Women's Champions League
- 2025–26 European Aquatics Women's Euro Cup
- 2025–26 European Aquatics Women's Conference Cup
- 2025–26 European Aquatics Women's Challenger Cup
- 2025 European Aquatics Women's Super Cup

Reference
Matchday 1
Matchday 2
