= Juntos Otra Vez (tour) =

2025 concert tour by Erreway

- Tour by Erreway
- Location: Asia; Europe; South America
- Associated album: Various
- Start date: 20 March 2025
- End date: 13 December 2025
- Legs: 3
- No. of shows: 37

Erreway concert chronology
- Erreway: Gira en España (2006); Juntos Otra Vez (2025); ...

Juntos Otra Vez Tour is the fifth concert tour of the Argentine pop-rock band Erreway, scheduled for 2025. This tour marks the return of the original band members - Felipe Colombo, Camila Bordonaba and Benjamín Rojas - to the stage after several years of absence since their last concert tour, "Erreway: Gira de España in 2006". The tour celebrates the musical legacy of Erreway, a group that achieved great popularity through their participation in the hit teen series Rebelde Way. The tour was announced on November 25, 2024, the tour features the participation of the fourth member of the band Luisana Lopilato.

The tour kicked off on March 28, 2025 in Santiago, Chile, and is set to conclude on 13 December 2025 in Cordoba, Argentina.

== Background ==
Erreway is an Argentine pop-rock band formed in 2002 as part of the successful television series Rebelde Way (2002–2003), created by Cris Morena through the Cris Morena Group. The series starred Luisana Lopilato, Camila Bordonaba, Benjamín Rojas, and Felipe Colombo. The programme came to an end in December 2003 after two highly successful seasons on air, following the release of three studio albums: Señales (2002), Tiempo (2003) and Memoria(2004), and successful international tours. Luisana Lopilato left the band in 2004 to focus on her acting career. On 7 December 2006, Erreway performed their last concert tour, "Erreway: Tour in Spain" in Madrid. The group then immersed themselves in the recording of their fourth album, Vuelvo, which, for unknown reasons, was never released, and their 2007 tour of Spain was cancelled, marking the band's definitive break-up. The album was released on digital platforms in 2021, 14 years after it was recorded.

Between 2002 and 2006, the band Erreway sold more than 5 million albums, 1 million tickets, and received multiple gold and platinum discs for their high sales figures, making them one of the most prominent bands in Hispanic music and one of the biggest pop-rock acts in their country.

On 25 November 2024, Rojas, Colombo and Cris Morena confirmed on social media that the band would be returning to the stage, with a recording featuring the first two and Camila Bordonaba, after years of absence from the entertainment world. The tour will not only mark the group's return to the stage, but will also feature songs from their latest album, which have never been performed live.

Days later, after several rumours and speculations about the presence of the fourth and final member, Luisana Lopilato, she confirmed on her social media accounts that she will not be part of this tour for strictly professional reasons.

After their first concert in Santiago, Chile, Erreway announced their first concert in Argentina in almost 21 years. It will be at the Movistar Arena on 29 August 2025. This show will mark the group's return to their home country, the last time they performed there being on 16 October 2004 at the Luna Park Stadium.

== Setlist ==
This setlist is the one the band plays regularly during the tour.

1. "Girar"
2. "Rebelde Way"
3. "Memoria"
4. "Tiempo"
5. "Solo se"
6. "Que Estés"
7. "Dame"
8. "Vamos al ruedo"
9. "Te soñe"
10. "Mi vida"
11. "Vivo como vivo"
12. "Será de Dios"
13. "Dije adiós" / "Amor de Engaño"
14. "Me da igual"
15. "No estés seguro"
16. "Asignatura Pendiente"
17. "Que se siente"
18. "Vas a Salvarte"
19. "Inmortal"
20. "Bonita de Más"
21. "Para Cosas Buenas"
22. "Será Porque Te Quiero"
23. "Resistiré"
24. "Sweet Baby"

== Tour dates ==
Date	City	Country	Venue	Note	Spectators	Ref
28 March 2025	Santiago	Chile	Movistar Arena	-	-	
5 April 2025	Montevideo	Uruguay	Antel Arena	-	-	
24 April 2025	Quito	Ecuador	Coliseo Rumiñahui	-	-	
26 April 2025	Guayaquil	Ecuador	Estadio Modelo	-	-	
3 May 2025	Lima	Peru	Costa 21	-	-	
4 May 2025	Lima	Peru	Costa 21	-	-	
6 May 2025	Lima	Peru	Costa 21	-	-	
7 May 2025	Lima	Peru	Costa 21	-	-	
4 June 2025	Napoles	Italy	Teatro Palapartenope	-	-	-
6 June 2025	Madrid	Spain	WiZink Center	-	-	
7 June 2025	Barcelona	Spain	Palau Sant Jordi	-	-	
6 July 2025	Limasol	Cyprus	Zante Venue	-	-	-
10 July 2025	Atenas	Greece	Lycabettus Theatre	-	-	
15 July 2025	Atenas	Greece	Lycabettus Theatre	-	-	
13 July 2025	Milan	Italy	Live Arena	Festival	-	-
17 July 2025	Marbella	Spain	Cantera de Nagüeles	Festival	-	
20 July 2025	Madrid	Spain	WiZink Center	-	-	
10 August 2025	Lima	Peru	Costa 21			
12 August 2025	Arequipa	Peru	Jardín de la Cerveza			
16 August 2025	Mexico City	Mexico	World Trade Center Mexico City			
29 August 2025	Buenos Aires	Argentina	Movistar Arena	-	-	
30 August 2025	Buenos Aires	Argentina	Movistar Arena	-	-	
3 September 2025	Buenos Aires	Argentina	Movistar Arena	-	-	
4 September 2025	Buenos Aires	Argentina	Movistar Arena	-	-	
16 September 2025	Buenos Aires	Argentina	Movistar Arena	-	-	
17 September 2025	Buenos Aires	Argentina	Movistar Arena	-	-	
23 September 2025	Buenos Aires	Argentina	Movistar Arena	-	-	
24 September 2025	Buenos Aires	Argentina	Movistar Arena	-	-	
29 September 2025	Buenos Aires	Argentina	Movistar Arena	-	-	
17 October 2025	Santo Domingo	Dominican Republic	Centro Olímpico Juan Pablo Duarte	-	-	
20 October 2025	San José	Costa Rica	Anfiteatro Coca Cola	-		
7 November 2025	Santa Fe	Argentina	Club Unión			
9 November 2025	Rosario	Argentina	Teatro Metropolitano			
15 November 2025	Asunción	Paraguay	Club Paraguayo			
22 November 2025	Montevideo	Uruguay	Antel Arena			
6 December 2025	Tucumán	Argentina	Central Córdoba			
13 December 2025	Córdoba	Argentina	Plaza de la Música			

=== Cancelled dates ===
Date	City	Country	Venue	Reason
12 July 2025	Bucharest	Romania	Arenere Romane	Poor sales
