= Napolitan =

Napolitan may refer to:

- Naporitan or Napolitan, a pasta dish popular in Japan
- Neapolitan (disambiguation), various meanings pertaining to the city or region of Naples (Napoli) in Italy

== Persons ==
- Joseph Napolitan (1929–2013), American political consultant

== See also ==
- Napoletano (disambiguation)
- Napolitano
