= Napoli (disambiguation) =

Napoli is the Italian language name for the city, gulf, and province of Naples.

Napoli may also refer to:

== Places ==
- Gulf of Naples (Italian Golfo di Napoli), the gulf off the coast of Naples
- Metropolitan City of Naples (Italian Città metropolitana di Napoli), Campania, Italy
- Napoli, New York, a town in the United States of America
- Napoli di Malvasia, ancient name of Monemvasia, a city in Greece
- Napoli di Romania, ancient name of Nafplio, a seaport in Greece
- Nāpili, in Hawaii

== Media and entertainment ==
- il Napoli, a local Italian newspaper
- Napoli (album), a 1996 album by Italian singer Mina
- Napoli (ballet), an 1842 ballet by August Bournonville
- Napoli, Napoli, Napoli, a 2009 documentary film about Naples
- Napoli (music project), a Belarusian music project

== Ships ==
- Italian battleship Napoli, an Italian battleship completed in 1908
- MSC Napoli, a container ship which ran aground and was salvaged in Devon in 2007

== Other uses ==
- Napoli (surname)
- S.S. Basket Napoli, an Italian professional basketball club based in Naples
- S.S.C. Napoli, a football team based in Naples
- 54th Infantry Division Napoli, an Italian infantry division of World War II

== See also ==
- Naples (disambiguation)
- Neapoli (disambiguation)
