= 2025–26 European Aquatics Conference Cup qualification round I =

- 2025–26

Tournament information
- Sport: Water polo
- Date: 7–9 November 2025
- Host(s): (Netherlands) Utrecht (Greece) Athens (Croatia) Split (Serbia) Belgrade (Croatia) Rijeka
- Teams: 19 (from 14 countries)
- Website: Official website

Tournament statistics
- Matches played: 27

The 2025–26 European Aquatics Conference Cup qualification round I is played between 7 and 9 November 2025 to determine the 10 teams advancing to the qualification round II of the 2025–26 European Aquatics Conference Cup.

== Format ==
The 19 teams were place into five groups of four or three teams. In each group, teams will play against each other once in a round-robin format. The top two in each group advance to the next round.

Teams are ranked according to points (3 points for a win, 2 points for a penalty shootout win, 1 point for a penalty shootout loss, 0 points for a loss), and if tied on points, the following tiebreaking criteria are applied, in the order given, to determine the rankings:

- Points in head-to-head matches among tied teams;
- Goal difference in head-to-head matches among tied teams;
- Goals scored in head-to-head matches among tied teams;
- Goal difference in all group matches;
- Goals scored in all group matches.

== Draw ==
External videos
- 2025–26 European Aquatics Conference Cup qualification round I – Draw
- Draw

The draw was on 11 August 2025 in Zagreb, Croatia. (H) indicates which clubs is hosting a group. The seeding is based on the club rankings.

Key to colours
Teams advancing to qualification round II

Pot 1
Team	Rank	Points
(Croatia) VK Primorje EB (H)	28	7,350
(Greece) Panionios GSS (H)	29	7,177.5
(Hungary) Endo Plus SH	36	3,915
(Lithuania) EVK Zaibas	37	3,677.5
(Portugal) Vitória SC	42	2,862.5

Pot 2
Team	Rank	Points
(Turkey) Galatasaray SK	43	2,655
(Serbia) VK Partizan (H)	47	2,215
(Spain) Tenerife Echeyde	59	1,330
(Netherlands) UZSC (H)	65	1,060
(Bosnia and Herzegovina) VK Banja Luka	72	760

Pot 3
Team	Rank	Points
(Spain) Solartradex CN Mataró	79	600
(Italy) De Akker Team	80	600
(Greece) AC PAOK	81	600
(Montenegro) PVK Budva BR	96	260
(France) Sète Natation	97	260

Pot 4
Team	Rank	Points
(Germany) White Sharks	100	110
(Italy) CN Posillipo	N/A	
(Croatia) VK Mornar Split (H)	N/A	
(Germany) SG Neukölln Berlin	N/A	

== Groups ==
=== Group A ===
7–9 November 2025, Utrecht, Netherlands.

Pos	Team	Pld	W	PSW	PSL	L	GF	GA	GD	Pts	Qualification	POS	ENDO	PAOK	UZSC
1	(Italy) CN Posillipo	3	2	1	0	0	46	35	+11	8	Qualification round II	—	—	—	—
2	(Hungary) Endo Plus SH	3	2	0	1	0	52	31	+21	7	Qualification round II	16–18	—	15–8	—
3	(Greece) AC PAOK	3	1	0	0	2	39	40	−1	3		—	—	—	12–15
4	(Netherlands) UZSC (H)	3	0	0	0	3	30	61	−31	0		10–18	10–24	10–19	—

Source: European Aquatics Conference Cup
(H) Host

7 November 2025; 19:00	Report	UZSC (Netherlands)	10–24	(Hungary) Endo Plus SH	De Krommerijn Swimming Pool, Utrecht; Referees: Eurico Silva (POR), Slaven Sivcevic (CRO)
7 November 2025; 19:00	Report	Score by quarters: 2–5, 2–6, 2–7, 4–6			De Krommerijn Swimming Pool, Utrecht; Referees: Eurico Silva (POR), Slaven Sivcevic (CRO)
7 November 2025; 19:00	Report	Wijnhoven 4	Goals	Suger 4	De Krommerijn Swimming Pool, Utrecht; Referees: Eurico Silva (POR), Slaven Sivcevic (CRO)

7 November 2025; 20:45	Report	AC PAOK (Greece)	12–15	(Italy) CN Posillipo	De Krommerijn Swimming Pool, Utrecht; Referees: Miroslav Mijanovic (MNE), Ralf Mueller (GER)
7 November 2025; 20:45	Report	Score by quarters: 3–5, 3–3, 3–5, 3–2			De Krommerijn Swimming Pool, Utrecht; Referees: Miroslav Mijanovic (MNE), Ralf Mueller (GER)
7 November 2025; 20:45	Report	Bitsakos 3	Goals	Radovic 5	De Krommerijn Swimming Pool, Utrecht; Referees: Miroslav Mijanovic (MNE), Ralf Mueller (GER)

8 November 2025; 18:00	Report	UZSC (Netherlands)	10–19	(Greece) AC PAOK	De Krommerijn Swimming Pool, Utrecht; Referees: Ralf Mueller (GER), Miroslav Mijanovic (MNE)
8 November 2025; 18:00	Report	Score by quarters: 1–4, 2–5, 6–6, 1–4			De Krommerijn Swimming Pool, Utrecht; Referees: Ralf Mueller (GER), Miroslav Mijanovic (MNE)
8 November 2025; 18:00	Report	De Jong, Edelbroek 3	Goals	Kechalaris 5	De Krommerijn Swimming Pool, Utrecht; Referees: Ralf Mueller (GER), Miroslav Mijanovic (MNE)

8 November 2025; 19:45	Report	Endo Plus SH (Hungary)	16–18 (PSO)	(Italy) CN Posillipo	De Krommerijn Swimming Pool, Utrecht; Referees: Slaven Sivcevic (CRO), Eurico Silva (POR)
8 November 2025; 19:45	Report	Score by quarters: 3–2, 3–3, 3–4, 4–4 PSO: 3–5			De Krommerijn Swimming Pool, Utrecht; Referees: Slaven Sivcevic (CRO), Eurico Silva (POR)
8 November 2025; 19:45	Report	Moskov 5	Goals	three players 3	De Krommerijn Swimming Pool, Utrecht; Referees: Slaven Sivcevic (CRO), Eurico Silva (POR)

9 November 2025; 09:30	Report	Endo Plus SH (Hungary)	15–8	(Greece) AC PAOK	De Krommerijn Swimming Pool, Utrecht; Referees: Slaven Sivcevic (CRO), Miroslav Mijanovic (MNE)
9 November 2025; 09:30	Report	Score by quarters: 4–4, 5–1, 3–2, 3–1			De Krommerijn Swimming Pool, Utrecht; Referees: Slaven Sivcevic (CRO), Miroslav Mijanovic (MNE)
9 November 2025; 09:30	Report	Moskov, Vickovic 5	Goals	Delic 3	De Krommerijn Swimming Pool, Utrecht; Referees: Slaven Sivcevic (CRO), Miroslav Mijanovic (MNE)

9 November 2025; 11:15	Report	UZSC (Netherlands)	10–18	(Italy) CN Posillipo	De Krommerijn Swimming Pool, Utrecht; Referees: Ralf Mueller (GER), Eurico Silva (POR)
9 November 2025; 11:15	Report	Score by quarters: 3–2, 1–5, 5–4, 1–7			De Krommerijn Swimming Pool, Utrecht; Referees: Ralf Mueller (GER), Eurico Silva (POR)
9 November 2025; 11:15	Report	De Jong, Wijnhoven 3	Goals	Cuccovillo, Rocchino 4	De Krommerijn Swimming Pool, Utrecht; Referees: Ralf Mueller (GER), Eurico Silva (POR)

=== Group B ===
7–9 November 2025, Athens, Greece.

Pos	Team	Pld	W	PSW	PSL	L	GF	GA	GD	Pts	Qualification	PAN	TEN	BUD	WHI
1	(Greece) Panionios GSS (H)	3	3	0	0	0	50	34	+16	9	Qualification round II	—	—	16–13	19–10
2	(Spain) Tenerife Echeyde	3	1	1	0	1	49	42	+7	5	Qualification round II	11–15	—	19–18 (Note: Match ended 16–16. Tenerife Echeyde won 3–2 on penalties.)	—
3	(Montenegro) PVK Budva BR	3	1	0	1	1	48	41	+7	4		—	—	—	19–9
4	(Germany) White Sharks	3	0	0	0	3	30	60	−30	0		—	11–22	—	—

Source: European Aquatics Conference Cup
(H) Host

7 November 2025; 18:30	Report	Tenerife Echeyde (Spain)	19–18 (PSO)	(Montenegro) PVK Budva BR	Nea Smyrni Swimming Pool, Athens; Referees: Levan Berishvili (GEO), Tomas Kaseta (LTU)
7 November 2025; 18:30	Report	Score by quarters: 5–2, 5–8, 3–4, 3–2 PSO: 3–2			Nea Smyrni Swimming Pool, Athens; Referees: Levan Berishvili (GEO), Tomas Kaseta (LTU)
7 November 2025; 18:30	Report	Araya 7	Goals	Milic 9	Nea Smyrni Swimming Pool, Athens; Referees: Levan Berishvili (GEO), Tomas Kaseta (LTU)

7 November 2025; 20:30	Report	Panionios GSS (Greece)	19–10	(Germany) White Sharks	Nea Smyrni Swimming Pool, Athens; Referees: Manuel Manea (ROU), Pavle Kis (SRB)
7 November 2025; 20:30	Report	Score by quarters: 4–1, 5–3, 5–2, 5–4			Nea Smyrni Swimming Pool, Athens; Referees: Manuel Manea (ROU), Pavle Kis (SRB)
7 November 2025; 20:30	Report	three players 4	Goals	Molnar 4	Nea Smyrni Swimming Pool, Athens; Referees: Manuel Manea (ROU), Pavle Kis (SRB)

8 November 2025; 18:30	Report	Tenerife Echeyde (Spain)	11–15	(Greece) Panionios GSS	Nea Smyrni Swimming Pool, Athens; Referees: Levan Berishvili (GEO), Manuel Manea (ROU)
8 November 2025; 18:30	Report	Score by quarters: 4–0, 1–7, 3–4, 3–4			Nea Smyrni Swimming Pool, Athens; Referees: Levan Berishvili (GEO), Manuel Manea (ROU)
8 November 2025; 18:30	Report	Ramirez Rodriguez 4	Goals	Gounas 6	Nea Smyrni Swimming Pool, Athens; Referees: Levan Berishvili (GEO), Manuel Manea (ROU)

8 November 2025; 20:30	Report	PVK Budva BR (Montenegro)	19–9	(Germany) White Sharks	Nea Smyrni Swimming Pool, Athens; Referees: Tomas Kaseta (LTU), Pavle Kis (SRB)
8 November 2025; 20:30	Report	Score by quarters: 6–2, 4–2, 4–1, 5–4			Nea Smyrni Swimming Pool, Athens; Referees: Tomas Kaseta (LTU), Pavle Kis (SRB)
8 November 2025; 20:30	Report	Milic 5	Goals	Rotermund 3	Nea Smyrni Swimming Pool, Athens; Referees: Tomas Kaseta (LTU), Pavle Kis (SRB)

9 November 2025; 10:30	Report	White Sharks (Germany)	11–22	(Spain) Tenerife Echeyde	Nea Smyrni Swimming Pool, Athens; Referees: Pavle Kis (SRB), Tomas Kaseta (LTU)
9 November 2025; 10:30	Report	Score by quarters: 5–6, 4–4, 1–6, 1–6			Nea Smyrni Swimming Pool, Athens; Referees: Pavle Kis (SRB), Tomas Kaseta (LTU)
9 November 2025; 10:30	Report	Rotermund 3	Goals	Araya 7	Nea Smyrni Swimming Pool, Athens; Referees: Pavle Kis (SRB), Tomas Kaseta (LTU)

9 November 2025; 13:00	Report	Panionios GSS (Greece)	16–13	(Montenegro) PVK Budva BR	Nea Smyrni Swimming Pool, Athens; Referees: Levan Berishvili (GEO), Manuel Manea (ROU)
9 November 2025; 13:00	Report	Score by quarters: 6–4, 4–3, 4–4, 2–2			Nea Smyrni Swimming Pool, Athens; Referees: Levan Berishvili (GEO), Manuel Manea (ROU)
9 November 2025; 13:00	Report	Gounas 6	Goals	three players 3	Nea Smyrni Swimming Pool, Athens; Referees: Levan Berishvili (GEO), Manuel Manea (ROU)

=== Group C ===
7–9 November 2025, Split, Croatia.

Pos	Team	Pld	W	PSW	PSL	L	GF	GA	GD	Pts	Qualification	MOR	SET	VIT	BAN
1	(Croatia) VK Mornar Split (H)	3	3	0	0	0	64	24	+40	9	Qualification round II	—	—	24–11	24–4
2	(France) Sète Natation	3	2	0	0	1	72	28	+44	6	Qualification round II	9–16	—	—	—
3	(Portugal) Vitória SC	3	1	0	0	2	39	50	−11	3		—	8–20	—	20–6
4	(Bosnia and Herzegovina) VK Banja Luka	3	0	0	0	3	14	87	−73	0		—	4–43	—	—

Source: European Aquatics Conference Cup
(H) Host

7 November 2025; 18:45	Report	VK Banja Luka (Bosnia and Herzegovina)	4–43	(France) Sète Natation	Stari bazen, Split; Referees: Georgios Lampros Kravaritis (GRE), Luis Perez Munoz (ESP)
7 November 2025; 18:45	Report	Score by quarters: 0–10, 1–9, 2–11, 1–13			Stari bazen, Split; Referees: Georgios Lampros Kravaritis (GRE), Luis Perez Munoz (ESP)
7 November 2025; 18:45	Report	four players 1	Goals	Lopinot, Sauton 6	Stari bazen, Split; Referees: Georgios Lampros Kravaritis (GRE), Luis Perez Munoz (ESP)

7 November 2025; 20:30	Report	VK Mornar Split (Croatia)	24–11	(Portugal) Vitória SC	Stari bazen, Split; Referees: Peter Radic (SVK), Riccardo D'Antoni (ITA)
7 November 2025; 20:30	Report	Score by quarters: 9–4, 5–3, 5–1, 5–3			Stari bazen, Split; Referees: Peter Radic (SVK), Riccardo D'Antoni (ITA)
7 November 2025; 20:30	Report	Stojanac 7	Goals	Moreira 3	Stari bazen, Split; Referees: Peter Radic (SVK), Riccardo D'Antoni (ITA)

8 November 2025; 18:00	Report	Vitória SC (Portugal)	20–6	(Bosnia and Herzegovina) VK Banja Luka	Stari bazen, Split; Referees: Peter Radic (SVK), Georgios Lampros Kravaritis (GRE)
8 November 2025; 18:00	Report	Score by quarters: 6–0, 7–2, 4–3, 3–1			Stari bazen, Split; Referees: Peter Radic (SVK), Georgios Lampros Kravaritis (GRE)
8 November 2025; 18:00	Report	Moreira 7	Goals	Cosic, Djukic 2	Stari bazen, Split; Referees: Peter Radic (SVK), Georgios Lampros Kravaritis (GRE)

8 November 2025; 19:45	Report	Sète Natation (France)	9–16	(Croatia) VK Mornar Split	Stari bazen, Split; Referees: Riccardo D'Antoni (ITA), Luis Perez Munoz (ESP)
8 November 2025; 19:45	Report	Score by quarters: 2–4, 2–4, 3–3, 2–5			Stari bazen, Split; Referees: Riccardo D'Antoni (ITA), Luis Perez Munoz (ESP)
8 November 2025; 19:45	Report	Mureddu, Radojevic 2	Goals	Zivkovic 5	Stari bazen, Split; Referees: Riccardo D'Antoni (ITA), Luis Perez Munoz (ESP)

9 November 2025; 11:00	Report	Vitória SC (Portugal)	8–20	(France) Sète Natation	Stari bazen, Split; Referees: Peter Radic (SVK), Luis Perez Munoz (ESP)
9 November 2025; 11:00	Report	Score by quarters: 0–3, 0–5, 4–9, 4–3			Stari bazen, Split; Referees: Peter Radic (SVK), Luis Perez Munoz (ESP)
9 November 2025; 11:00	Report	Mariani Rodrigues, Ramos 2	Goals	Radojevic 5	Stari bazen, Split; Referees: Peter Radic (SVK), Luis Perez Munoz (ESP)

9 November 2025; 12:45	Report	VK Mornar Split (Croatia)	24–4	(Bosnia and Herzegovina) VK Banja Luka	Stari bazen, Split; Referees: Georgios Lampros Kravaritis (GRE), Riccardo D'Antoni (ITA)
9 November 2025; 12:45	Report	Score by quarters: 5–0, 4–0, 6–2, 9–2			Stari bazen, Split; Referees: Georgios Lampros Kravaritis (GRE), Riccardo D'Antoni (ITA)
9 November 2025; 12:45	Report	three players 4	Goals	four players 1	Stari bazen, Split; Referees: Georgios Lampros Kravaritis (GRE), Riccardo D'Antoni (ITA)

=== Group D ===
7–9 November 2025, Belgrade, Serbia.

Pos	Team	Pld	W	PSW	PSL	L	GF	GA	GD	Pts	Qualification	AKK	PAR	ZAI	BER
1	(Italy) De Akker Team	3	2	0	0	1	57	32	+25	6 (Note: Head to head goal difference: De Akker Team 3 Pts, +6 GD; VK Partizan 3 Pts, −1 GD; EVK Zaibas 3 Pts, −5 GD)	Qualification round II	—	—	21–13	—
2	(Serbia) VK Partizan (H)	3	2	0	0	1	47	35	+12	6	Qualification round II	13–11	—	—	21–8
3	(Lithuania) EVK Zaibas	3	2	0	0	1	45	46	−1	6		—	16–13	—	—
4	(Germany) SG Neukölln Berlin	3	0	0	0	3	26	62	−36	0		6–25	—	12–16	—

Source: European Aquatics Conference Cup
(H) Host
Notes:

7 November 2025; 19:00	Report	VK Partizan (Serbia)	21–8	(Germany) SG Neukölln Berlin	11th April Sports and Recreation Center, Belgrade; Referees: Julien Bourges (FRA), Gokhan Can Ciger (TUR)
7 November 2025; 19:00	Report	Score by quarters: 5–3, 4–1, 5–2, 7–2			11th April Sports and Recreation Center, Belgrade; Referees: Julien Bourges (FRA), Gokhan Can Ciger (TUR)
7 November 2025; 19:00	Report	Bodiroga 4	Goals	Costa 4	11th April Sports and Recreation Center, Belgrade; Referees: Julien Bourges (FRA), Gokhan Can Ciger (TUR)

7 November 2025; 20:45	Report	De Akker Team (Italy)	21–13	(Lithuania) EVK Zaibas	11th April Sports and Recreation Center, Belgrade; Referees: Alex Mas Marquez (ESP), Roeland Sonnemans (NED)
7 November 2025; 20:45	Report	Score by quarters: 3–1, 8–3, 6–4, 4–5			11th April Sports and Recreation Center, Belgrade; Referees: Alex Mas Marquez (ESP), Roeland Sonnemans (NED)
7 November 2025; 20:45	Report	Campopiano 6	Goals	Jelača 3	11th April Sports and Recreation Center, Belgrade; Referees: Alex Mas Marquez (ESP), Roeland Sonnemans (NED)

8 November 2025; 17:45	Report	EVK Zaibas (Lithuania)	16–13	(Serbia) VK Partizan	11th April Sports and Recreation Center, Belgrade; Referees: Alex Mas Marquez (ESP), Julien Bourges (FRA)
8 November 2025; 17:45	Report	Score by quarters: 4–4, 3–3, 5–2, 4–4			11th April Sports and Recreation Center, Belgrade; Referees: Alex Mas Marquez (ESP), Julien Bourges (FRA)
8 November 2025; 17:45	Report	Jelača 6	Goals	Dokanovic 5	11th April Sports and Recreation Center, Belgrade; Referees: Alex Mas Marquez (ESP), Julien Bourges (FRA)

8 November 2025; 19:30	Report	SG Neukölln Berlin (Germany)	6–25	(Italy) De Akker Team	11th April Sports and Recreation Center, Belgrade; Referees: Gokhan Can Ciger (TUR), Roeland Sonnemans (NED)
8 November 2025; 19:30	Report	Score by quarters: 0–5, 1–8, 1–7, 4–5			11th April Sports and Recreation Center, Belgrade; Referees: Gokhan Can Ciger (TUR), Roeland Sonnemans (NED)
8 November 2025; 19:30	Report	Costa 2	Goals	Di Murro, Erdely 4	11th April Sports and Recreation Center, Belgrade; Referees: Gokhan Can Ciger (TUR), Roeland Sonnemans (NED)

9 November 2025; 09:00	Report	SG Neukölln Berlin (Germany)	12–16	(Lithuania) EVK Zaibas	11th April Sports and Recreation Center, Belgrade; Referees: Julien Bourges (FRA), Roeland Sonnemans (NED)
9 November 2025; 09:00	Report	Score by quarters: 1–6, 3–5, 5–2, 3–3			11th April Sports and Recreation Center, Belgrade; Referees: Julien Bourges (FRA), Roeland Sonnemans (NED)
9 November 2025; 09:00	Report	Gottfried, Smit 3	Goals	Jonkus 4	11th April Sports and Recreation Center, Belgrade; Referees: Julien Bourges (FRA), Roeland Sonnemans (NED)

9 November 2025; 10:45	Report	VK Partizan (Serbia)	13–11	(Italy) De Akker Team	11th April Sports and Recreation Center, Belgrade; Referees: Alex Mas Marquez (ESP), Gokhan Can Ciger (TUR)
9 November 2025; 10:45	Report	Score by quarters: 1–1, 6–3, 4–4, 2–3			11th April Sports and Recreation Center, Belgrade; Referees: Alex Mas Marquez (ESP), Gokhan Can Ciger (TUR)
9 November 2025; 10:45	Report	Dokanovic 5	Goals	Erdely 4	11th April Sports and Recreation Center, Belgrade; Referees: Alex Mas Marquez (ESP), Gokhan Can Ciger (TUR)

=== Group E ===
7–9 November 2025, Rijeka, Croatia.

Pos	Team	Pld	W	PSW	PSL	L	GF	GA	GD	Pts	Qualification	PRI	MAT	GAL
1	(Croatia) VK Primorje EB (H)	2	2	0	0	0	50	18	+32	6	Qualification round II	—	23–11	27–7
2	(Spain) Solartradex CN Mataró	2	1	0	0	1	33	39	−6	3	Qualification round II	—	—	22–16
3	(Turkey) Galatasaray SK	2	0	0	0	2	23	49	−26	0		—	—	—

Source: European Aquatics Conference Cup
(H) Host

7 November 2025; 19:00	Report	Solartradex CN Mataró (Spain)	22–16	(Turkey) Galatasaray SK	Kantrida Swimming Pool, Rijeka; Referees: Matjaz Homvec (SLO), Antonio Guarracino (ITA)
7 November 2025; 19:00	Report	Score by quarters: 7–7, 5–3, 5–5, 5–1			Kantrida Swimming Pool, Rijeka; Referees: Matjaz Homvec (SLO), Antonio Guarracino (ITA)
7 November 2025; 19:00	Report	Aguirre Rubio 7	Goals	Caner 5	Kantrida Swimming Pool, Rijeka; Referees: Matjaz Homvec (SLO), Antonio Guarracino (ITA)

8 November 2025; 18:00	Report	VK Primorje EB (Croatia)	27–7	(Turkey) Galatasaray SK	Kantrida Swimming Pool, Rijeka; Referees: Matjaz Homvec (SLO), Frank Adam (HUN)
8 November 2025; 18:00	Report	Score by quarters: 8–2, 7–3, 6–1, 6–1			Kantrida Swimming Pool, Rijeka; Referees: Matjaz Homvec (SLO), Frank Adam (HUN)
8 November 2025; 18:00	Report	Crippa 6	Goals	Destici 2	Kantrida Swimming Pool, Rijeka; Referees: Matjaz Homvec (SLO), Frank Adam (HUN)

9 November 2025; 11:00	Report	VK Primorje EB (Croatia)	23–11	(Spain) Solartradex CN Mataró	Kantrida Swimming Pool, Rijeka; Referees: Frank Adam (HUN), Antonio Guarracino (ITA)
9 November 2025; 11:00	Report	Score by quarters: 6–1, 6–5, 4–4, 7–1			Kantrida Swimming Pool, Rijeka; Referees: Frank Adam (HUN), Antonio Guarracino (ITA)
9 November 2025; 11:00	Report	Radulović 8	Goals	Bertran Pont 3	Kantrida Swimming Pool, Rijeka; Referees: Frank Adam (HUN), Antonio Guarracino (ITA)

== See also ==
- 2025–26 European Aquatics Champions League
- 2025–26 European Aquatics Euro Cup
- 2025–26 European Aquatics Conference Cup
- 2025–26 European Aquatics Challenger Cup
- 2025 European Aquatics Super Cup
- 2025–26 European Aquatics Women's Champions League
- 2025–26 European Aquatics Women's Euro Cup
- 2025–26 European Aquatics Women's Conference Cup
- 2025–26 European Aquatics Women's Challenger Cup
- 2025 European Aquatics Women's Super Cup

Reference
Matchday 1
Matchday 2
Matchday 3
