= 2025–26 European Aquatics Conference Cup =

Water polo sports season

European Aquatics Conference Cup
- 2025–26

Tournament information
- Sport: Water polo
- Date: Qualification Round I: 7–9 November 2025; Qualification Round II: 19–22 February 2026; Quarterfinals: 20–22 March 2026; Final Four: 2–3 May 2026
- Tournament format(s): Round Robin and Knockout stage
- Teams: Qualification round I: 19 (Note: From 14 countries); Qualification round II: 10+8 (Note: From 11 countries); Quarterfinals: 8 Final Four: 4 Total: 19+8 (from 16 countries)
- Website: Official website

Final positions
- Champion: (Italy) De Akker Team (1st title)
- Runner-up: (Hungary) Endo Plus SH

The 2025–26 European Aquatics Conference Cup is the 1st edition of European Aquatics's new tertiary club competition (replacing the Challenger Cup) for men's water polo clubs. The season begins on 7 November 2025 and ended on 3 May 2026 with the Final Four.

The winners of the European Aquatics Conference Cup automatically qualify for next season's Euro Cup, (if they choose to enter).

De Akker Team won their first title after beating Endo Plus SH 17–14 in the final in Athens.

== Rankings ==
The results were based on the results of the past four seasons.

- Associations 1–10 can have two teams ranked 5th and 6th qualify.
- Associations 11–12 can have two teams ranked 3rd, 4th and 5th qualify.
- Associations 13 and below can have one team ranked 1st qualify.

Apart from the distribution based on the rankings, countries could have additional teams participating in the Conference Cup, as noted below:

- (EC) – Additional teams dropping down from the Euro Cup

Rank	Association	Points	Teams	Notes
1	Italy	99,917.5	2	
2	Hungary	80,465	1	
3	Serbia	71,510	1	+1 (EC)
4	Spain	69,187.5	2	
5	Greece	59,917.5	2	+1 (EC)
6	Croatia	59,642.5	2	
7	France	41,195	1	+1 (EC)
8	Germany	24,812.5	2	+1 (EC)
9	Romania	23,817.5	0	+1 (EC)
10	Montenegro	18,647.5	1	
11	(Georgia (country)) Georgia	10,292.5	0	+2 (EC)
12	Netherlands	5,790	1	+1 (EC)
13	Turkey	5,722.5	1	
14	Portugal	5,292.5	1	
15	Switzerland	4,245	0	

Rank	Association	Points	Teams	Notes
16	Slovenia	3,800	0	
17	Lithuania	3,677.5	1	
18	Slovakia	3,555	0	
19	(United Kingdom) Great Britain	2,280	0	
20	Belgium	2,170	0	
21	Israel	1,850	0	
22	Cyprus	1,490	0	
23	Malta	1,472	0	
24	Finland	1,420	0	
25	Bosnia and Herzegovina	1,190	1	
26	Russia	1,087.5	0	
27	Bulgaria	370	0	
28	Poland	317.5	0	
29	Denmark	280	0	

=== Ranking facts ===
Biggest rise
Pos	Team	Ori	New	Move
1	Cyprus	28	22	▲ +6
2	Portugal	17	14	▲ +3
2	Israel	24	21	▲ +3

Biggest fall
Pos	Team	Ori	New	Move
1	Russia	13	26	▼ –13
2	Bosnia and Herzegovina	20	25	▼ –5
3	Denmark	25	29	▼ –4

New entries
None

Leaving entries
None

== Teams ==
The teams finishing in fifth and sixth from national leagues ranked 1–10, placing in third through fifth from national leagues ranked 11–12 and champions from countries ranked 13 and below are permitted to enter.

Everyone who enters starts in the qualification round I.

Unlike last season, in the event that a club decides not to enter, the next best ranked team is not allowed to take their place. However, this rule wasn't implemented all the time.

=== Qualified teams ===
The labels in the parentheses show how each team qualified for the place of its starting round:

- 1st, 2nd, 3rd, 4th, etc.: League positions of the previous season
- EC: Transferred from the Euro Cup
  - QR: Transferred from the Euro Cup qualification round

Entry round	Teams			
Qualification round II	(Greece) GS Apollon Smyrnis (EC QR)	(Georgia (country)) A-Polo Sport Management (EC QR)	(Serbia) VK Crvena zvezda (EC QR)	(Romania) CS Rapid București (EC QR)
Qualification round II	(Netherlands) ZV De Zaan (EC QR)	(France) Montpellier Water Polo (EC QR)	(Georgia (country)) WPC Dinamo Tbilisi (EC QR)	(Germany) OSC Potsdam (EC QR)
Qualification round I	(Italy) CN Posillipo (5th)	(Italy) De Akker Team (6th)	(Hungary) Endo Plus SH (5th)	(Serbia) VK Partizan (5th)
Qualification round I	(Spain) CN Mataró (5th)	(Spain) Tenerife Echeyde (6th)	(Greece) Panionios GSS (5th)	(Greece) AC PAOK (6th)
Qualification round I	(Croatia) VK Primorje EB (5th)	(Croatia) VK Mornar Split (6th)	(France) Sète Natation (4th)	(Germany) White Sharks (5th)
Qualification round I	(Germany) SG Neukölln Berlin (6th)	(Montenegro) PVK Budva BR (5th)	(Netherlands) UZSC (3rd)	(Turkey) Galatasaray SK (1st)
Qualification round I	(Portugal) Vitória SC (1st)	(Lithuania) EVK Zaibas (1st)	(Bosnia and Herzegovina) VK Banja Luka (1st)	

==== Name changes ====
The following teams' names were changed during the season.

Original name	New name	Matchday
(Spain) CN Mataró	(Spain) Solartradex CN Mataró	Qualification round I

== Rounds and draw dates ==
=== Schedule ===
Phase	Draw date	Round date
Qualification round I	11 August 2025	7–9 November 2025
Qualification round II	19 November 2025	19–22 February 2026
Quarterfinals	2 March 2026	20–22 March 2026
Final Four	TBD	2–3 May 2026

== Qualification round I ==
The top two qualify for the next round, while every team that comes from a country that is ranked below the top thirteen drop down to the Challenger Cup. The draw was on 11 August 2025 in Zagreb, Croatia. The seeding is based on the club rankings.

=== Group A ===
- 7–9 November 2025, Utrecht, Netherlands.

Pos	Team	Pld	W	PSW	PSL	L	GF	GA	GD	Pts	Qualification	POS	ENDO	PAOK	UZSC
1	(Italy) CN Posillipo	3	2	1	0	0	46	35	+11	8	Qualification round II	—	—	—	—
2	(Hungary) Endo Plus SH	3	2	0	1	0	52	31	+21	7	Qualification round II	16–18	—	15–8	—
3	(Greece) AC PAOK	3	1	0	0	2	39	40	−1	3		—	—	—	12–15
4	(Netherlands) UZSC (H)	3	0	0	0	3	30	61	−31	0		10–18	10–24	10–19	—

Source: European Aquatics Conference Cup
(H) Host

=== Group B ===
- 7–9 November 2025, Athens, Greece.

Pos	Team	Pld	W	PSW	PSL	L	GF	GA	GD	Pts	Qualification	PAN	TEN	BUD	WHI
1	(Greece) Panionios GSS (H)	3	3	0	0	0	50	34	+16	9	Qualification round II	—	—	16–13	19–10
2	(Spain) Tenerife Echeyde	3	1	1	0	1	49	42	+7	5	Qualification round II	11–15	—	19–18 (Note: Match ended 16–16. Tenerife Echeyde won 3–2 on penalties.)	—
3	(Montenegro) PVK Budva BR	3	1	0	1	1	48	41	+7	4		—	—	—	19–9
4	(Germany) White Sharks	3	0	0	0	3	30	60	−30	0		—	11–22	—	—

Source: European Aquatics Conference Cup
(H) Host

=== Group C ===
- 7–9 November 2025, Split, Croatia.

Pos	Team	Pld	W	PSW	PSL	L	GF	GA	GD	Pts	Qualification	MOR	SET	VIT	BAN
1	(Croatia) VK Mornar Split (H)	3	3	0	0	0	64	24	+40	9	Qualification round II	—	—	24–11	24–4
2	(France) Sète Natation	3	2	0	0	1	72	28	+44	6	Qualification round II	9–16	—	—	—
3	(Portugal) Vitória SC	3	1	0	0	2	39	50	−11	3		—	8–20	—	20–6
4	(Bosnia and Herzegovina) VK Banja Luka	3	0	0	0	3	14	87	−73	0		—	4–43	—	—

Source: European Aquatics Conference Cup
(H) Host

=== Group D ===
- 7–9 November 2025, Belgrade, Serbia.

Pos	Team	Pld	W	PSW	PSL	L	GF	GA	GD	Pts	Qualification	AKK	PAR	ZAI	BER
1	(Italy) De Akker Team	3	2	0	0	1	57	32	+25	6 (Note: Head to head goal difference: De Akker Team 3 Pts, +6 GD; VK Partizan 3 Pts, −1 GD; EVK Zaibas 3 Pts, −5 GD)	Qualification round II	—	—	21–13	—
2	(Serbia) VK Partizan (H)	3	2	0	0	1	47	35	+12	6	Qualification round II	13–11	—	—	21–8
3	(Lithuania) EVK Zaibas	3	2	0	0	1	45	46	−1	6		—	16–13	—	—
4	(Germany) SG Neukölln Berlin	3	0	0	0	3	26	62	−36	0		6–25	—	12–16	—

Source: European Aquatics Conference Cup
(H) Host

=== Group E ===
- 7–9 November 2025, Rijeka, Croatia.

Pos	Team	Pld	W	PSW	PSL	L	GF	GA	GD	Pts	Qualification	PRI	MAT	GAL
1	(Croatia) VK Primorje EB (H)	2	2	0	0	0	50	18	+32	6	Qualification round II	—	23–11	27–7
2	(Spain) Solartradex CN Mataró	2	1	0	0	1	33	39	−6	3	Qualification round II	—	—	22–16
3	(Turkey) Galatasaray SK	2	0	0	0	2	23	49	−26	0		—	—	—

Source: European Aquatics Conference Cup
(H) Host

== Qualification round II ==
The top two teams in each group qualify will advance to the next round. The draw was on 19 November 2025 in Zagreb, Croatia.

=== Group A ===
20–22 February 2026, Potsdam, Germany.

Pos	Team	Pld	W	PSW	PSL	L	GF	GA	GD	Pts	Qualification	APO	PAN	PAR	POT
1	(Greece) GS Apollon Smyrnis	3	3	0	0	0	54	37	+17	9	Quarterfinals	—	—	—	—
2	(Greece) Panionios GSS	3	2	0	0	1	47	35	+12	6	Quarterfinals	13–15	—	—	—
3	(Serbia) VK Partizan	3	1	0	0	2	43	39	+4	3		16–20	11–13	—	—
4	(Germany) OSC Potsdam (H)	3	0	0	0	3	23	56	−33	0		8–19	9–21	6–16	—

Source: European Aquatics Conference Cup
(H) Host

=== Group B ===
20–22 February 2026, Split, Croatia.

Pos	Team	Pld	W	PSW	PSL	L	GF	GA	GD	Pts	Qualification	MOR	TEN	ZDZ	RAP
1	(Croatia) VK Mornar Split (H)	3	2	1	0	0	47	34	+13	8	Quarterfinals	—	—	19–18 (Note: Match ended 12–12. VK Mornar Split won 7–6 on penalties.)	17–9
2	(Spain) Tenerife Echeyde	3	2	0	0	1	45	44	+1	6	Quarterfinals	13–18	—	—	—
3	(Netherlands) ZV De Zaan	3	1	0	1	1	41	40	+1	4		—	12–15	—	17–13
4	(Romania) CS Rapid București	3	0	0	0	3	36	51	−15	0		—	14–17	—	—

Source: European Aquatics Conference Cup
(H) Host

=== Group C ===
19–22 February 2026, Montpellier, France.

Pos	Team	Pld	W	PSW	PSL	L	GF	GA	GD	Pts	Qualification	END	AKK	MAN	PRI	MON
1	(Hungary) Endo Plus SH	4	3	1	0	0	57	41	+16	11	Quarterfinals	—	15–10	20–19 (Note: Match ended 14–14. Endo Plus SH won 6–5 on penalties.)	—	—
2	(Italy) De Akker Team	4	2	1	0	1	64	50	+14	8	Quarterfinals	—	—	—	—	—
3	(Georgia (country)) A-Polo Sport Management	4	1	1	2	0	59	52	+7	7		—	15–16 (Note: Match ended 12–12. De Akker Team won 3–4 on penalties.)	—	23–22 (Note: Match ended 13–13. A-Polo Sport Management won 10–9 on penalties.)	—
4	(Croatia) VK Primorje EB	4	1	0	1	2	57	56	+1	4		9–10	14–17	—	—	—
5	(France) Montpellier Water Polo (H)	4	0	0	0	4	46	84	−38	0		8–18	9–25	13–20	16–21	—

Source: European Aquatics Conference Cup
(H) Host

=== Group D ===
19–22 February 2026, Naples, Italy.

Pos	Team	Pld	W	PSW	PSL	L	GF	GA	GD	Pts	Qualification	POS	MAT	CRV	SET	DIN
1	(Italy) CN Posillipo (H)	4	4	0	0	0	51	31	+20	12	Quarterfinals	—	12–10	12–4	14–9	13–8
2	(Spain) Solartradex CN Mataró	4	3	0	0	1	58	35	+23	9	Quarterfinals	—	—	—	22–7	—
3	(Serbia) BVK Crvena zvezda	4	1	1	0	2	32	40	−8	5		—	7–9	—	14–13 (Note: Match ended 10–10. BVK Crvena zvezda won 4–3 on penalties.)	11–9
4	(France) Sète Natation	4	1	0	1	2	42	60	−18	4		—	—	—	—	—
5	(Georgia (country)) WPC Dinamo Tbilisi	4	0	0	0	4	40	57	−17	0		—	9–17	—	14–16	—

Source: European Aquatics Conference Cup
(H) Host

== Quarterfinals ==
The top two teams in each group qualify will advance to the next round. The draw was on 2 March 2026 in Zagreb, Croatia.

=== Group A ===
Pos	Team	Pld	W	PSW	PSL	L	GF	GA	GD	Pts	Qualification	END	PAN	POS	TEN
1	(Hungary) Endo Plus SH	3	3	0	0	0	46	39	+7	9	Final Four	—	—	—	—
2	(Greece) Panionios GSS (H)	3	2	0	0	1	40	35	+5	6	Final Four	12–15	—	—	15–8
3	(Italy) CN Posillipo	3	1	0	0	2	41	41	0	3		12–15	12–13	—	—
4	(Spain) Tenerife Echeyde	3	0	0	0	3	36	48	−12	0		15–16	—	13–17	—

Source: European Aquatics Conference Cup
(H) Host

=== Group B ===
Pos	Team	Pld	W	PSW	PSL	L	GF	GA	GD	Pts	Qualification	AKK	APO	MAT	MOR
1	(Italy) De Akker Team	3	2	0	0	1	41	44	−3	6 (Note: De Akker Team 14–11 GS Apollon Smyrnis)	Final Four	—	—	14–13	—
2	(Greece) GS Apollon Smyrnis (H)	3	2	0	0	1	43	33	+10	6	Final Four	11–14	—	15–10	17–9
3	(Spain) Solartradex CN Mataró	3	1	0	0	2	37	41	−4	3 (Note: Solartradex CN Mataró 14–12 VK Mornar Split)		—	—	—	—
4	(Croatia) VK Mornar Split	3	1	0	0	2	41	44	−3	3		20–13	—	12–14	—

Source: European Aquatics Conference Cup
(H) Host

== Final Four ==
The Final Four was held on 2–3 May 2026. The venue was held at the Restio Swimming Pool in Athens.

Semi-finals
(Hungary) Endo Plus SH	16
(Greece) GS Apollon Smyrnis	12
(Italy) De Akker Team	13
(Greece) Panionios GSS	12

Final
(Hungary) Endo Plus SH	14
(Italy) De Akker Team	17
Third place
(Greece) GS Apollon Smyrnis	15
(Greece) Panionios GSS	13

=== Third place game ===
3 May 2026; 18:30	Report	GS Apollon Smyrnis (Greece)	15–13	(Greece) Panionios GSS	Restio Swimming Pool, Athens; Referees: Julien Bourges (FRA), Juan Carlos Colominas Ezponda (ESP)
3 May 2026; 18:30	Report	Score by quarters: 4–6, 3–3, 6–2, 2–2			Restio Swimming Pool, Athens; Referees: Julien Bourges (FRA), Juan Carlos Colominas Ezponda (ESP)
3 May 2026; 18:30	Report	Gardikas 4	Goals	Bitsakos, Gounas 3	Restio Swimming Pool, Athens; Referees: Julien Bourges (FRA), Juan Carlos Colominas Ezponda (ESP)

=== Final ===
3 May 2026; 21:00	Report	Endo Plus SH (Hungary)	14–17	(Italy) De Akker Team	Restio Swimming Pool, Athens; Referees: Ivan Rakovic (SRB), Jakov Blaskovic (CRO)
3 May 2026; 21:00	Report	Score by quarters: 4–4, 4–4, 3–4, 3–5			Restio Swimming Pool, Athens; Referees: Ivan Rakovic (SRB), Jakov Blaskovic (CRO)
3 May 2026; 21:00	Report	Moskov 5	Goals	Milaković, Lucci 4	Restio Swimming Pool, Athens; Referees: Ivan Rakovic (SRB), Jakov Blaskovic (CRO)

2025–26 European Aquatics Conference Cup Champions

De Akker Team
First title

== See also ==
- 2025–26 European Aquatics Champions League
- 2025–26 European Aquatics Euro Cup
- 2025–26 European Aquatics Challenger Cup
- 2025 European Aquatics Super Cup
- 2025–26 European Aquatics Women's Champions League
- 2025–26 European Aquatics Women's Euro Cup
- 2025–26 European Aquatics Women's Conference Cup
- 2025–26 European Aquatics Women's Challenger Cup
- 2025 European Aquatics Women's Super Cup
