= Leonardo Esteves de Nápoles =

Leonardo Esteves de Nápoles (c. 1350 – 1421) was a Portuguese nobleman and military, the natural son of João Esteves and Catarina Esteves.

Because of his (as well as his father's) deeds in battle, he received an extraordinary amount of Lordships (Senhorios) from King Afonso IV: among these were those of Corjas, Penela and Seia. He was also granted full domain over a large extension of land around Braga, known as Veiga de Santa Maria. Because of this, in contemporary sources he is also referred to as Leonardo Esteves da Veiga). These donations made him one of the wealthiest land owners of his time in Portugal.

== Marriage and Children ==
Leonardo Esteves de Nápoles married Margarida Anes Afonso. Their only known son was João Esteves da Veiga de Nápoles.

== False origins of the family ==
Leonardo Esteves de Nápoles was said to be the eldest (and probably only) son of Stephen of Durazzo (an Italian crusader known in Portugal as Estêvão de Nápoles) and thus the second known member of the Portuguese Nápoles family, a secondary branch of the royal Capetian House of Anjou, of the Kings of Naples, but this is a posterior fabrication, as the origin of the surname de Nápoles, for there is no notice of any such bastard son of a Prince of Naples. His wife was also said to be Margarida Anes Afonso de Menezes, daughter of Dom João Afonso Telo, 4th Count of Barcelos, 1st Count of Ourém and 4th Admiral of Portugal, and wife Dona Guiomar Lopes Pacheco, but they had no daughter with this name.
