= Henrique da Veiga de Nápoles =

Portuguese noble

Henrique Esteves da Veiga de Nápoles, 2nd Lord of the Honour of Molelos (1449–1520) was a Portuguese nobleman and wealthy land owner, the eldest son of Henrique Esteves da Veiga de Nápoles, and therefore scion of the main branch of the Portuguese de Nápoles family.

He attended the Courts of Kings John II and Manuel I of Portugal, having been appointed Privy Counsellor by the latter. He is likely to have finished the construction of the Palace (Paço) of Molelos, started by his father, and he is known to have died there in 1520, upon his return from the court at Lisbon.

== Marriage and children ==
Henrique da Veiga de Nápoles married Beatriz Henriques, a noblewoman from Aveiro, daughter of Diogo Henriques and Catarina Gomes de Quadros. They had eight children, their heir being Henrique Esteves da Veiga de Nápoles, the Young:

- Manuel da Veiga, a Dominican Friar who was elected Bishop of Viseu, which he did not wanted to accept for his great humility
- Henrique Esteves da Veiga de Nápoles, the Young, 3rd Lord of the Honour of Molelos, married firstly Leonor Ortiz, natural daughter of Fernando Ortiz de Vilhegas, Abbot of Castelães, and had issue, and married secondly Violente do Quental, without issue
- Joana Henriques, a Nun at the Convent of Jesus of Aveiro
- Maria Henriques, married to Pedro Viçoso, Nobleman of the Royal Household
- Andreza Henriques, married to Aleixo de Figueiredo
- ... Henriques da Veiga, married to Brites da Veiga; had issue
