= Luigi Mazzella =

Italian lawyer and former judge of the Constitutional Court of Italy (2005–2014)

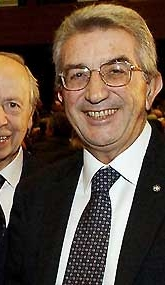
Luigi Mazzella

Luigi Mazzella (born 26 May 1932 in Salerno, Italy) is an Italian lawyer and former judge of the Constitutional Court of Italy (2005–2014).

== Education and career ==
Mazzella graduated cum laude with a degree in law from the University of Naples in 1954.

He was appointed as a state legal advisory officer on 13 December 2001, and a minister without portfolio for public functions from 14 November 2002 to 2 December 2004. He was elected by Parliament to a seat on the Constitutional Court on 15 June 2005, and was sworn in on 28 June 2005. On 29 June 2013 he was made vice president of the Court. His term ended on 28 June 2014.

In 2009 Italian Prime Minister Silvio Berlusconi visited Mazzella at a dinner party at his house, with fellow Constitutional Court judge Paolo Maria Napolitano and Justice Minister Angelino Alfano was also present. At the time an immunity bill which would also affect Berlusconi was under discussion in the Constitutional Court. The gathering provoked outrage under political opponents.
