= Francisco de Paula Vieira da Silva de Tovar, 1st Viscount of Molelos =

Francisco de Paula Vieira da Silva de Tovar 1st Viscount of Molelos
- Born: 1774
- Died: 1852 (aged 77–78)
- Military career
- Allegiance: Portuguese
- Rank: General
- Conflicts: Portuguese invasion of the Banda Oriental

Francisco de Paula Vieira da Silva de Tovar e Nápoles, 11th Lord of the Honour of Molelos, 1st Baron and 1st Viscount of Molelos (1774–1852) was a Portuguese military officer and politician. He is best known for his role in the Portuguese invasion of the Banda Oriental, under the reign of king John VI, as well as for his active participation in Portugal's resistance against the invading troops of Napoleon (1807–1810) and, towards the end of his life, for his support for the Absolutist or Traditionalist faction during the Portuguese Civil War, whose ranks he led as a General.

In 1862, exiled king Miguel I honoured him posthumously by creating his only surviving grandson, António Vieira de Tovar de Magalhães e Albuquerque, 1st Count of Molelos. This title, however, was never legally validated, and his only daughter died an infant.

The viscountcy was transmitted through a collateral line, namely the descendants of António's great-aunt, Josefa Vieira da Silva de Tovar.

== See also ==
- Viscount of Molelos
- Nápoles (family)
- Honour (feudalism)
