= Neapoli =

Neapoli or Neapolis (Greek: Νεάπολη; Ancient Greek: Νεάπολις; 'new town/city') may refer to:

== Geography ==
=== Greece ===
- Neapoli, Thessaloniki, a suburb and former municipality of Thessaloniki
- Neapoli-Sykies, a municipality of Thessaloniki
- Neapoli, Aetolia-Acarnania, a municipality in central Aetolia-Acarnania
- Neapoli, Elis, east of Vouprasías
- Neapoli, Kavala, a subdivision of Kavala
  - Neapolis (Thrace), ancient city of Macedonia, the Neapolis of Acts 16:11 in the Bible, near Neapoli, Kavala
- Neapoli, Lesbos, on the island of Lesbos
- Neapoli Voion, the main town in the municipality of Voies, Laconia
- Neapoli, Crete, municipality in Lasithi, Crete
- Neapoli, Athens, neighbourhood northwest of Lycabettus
- Neapoli Zarouchleikon, neighbourhood of Patras, Greece.
- Neapolis (Chalcidice), an ancient city on the Pallene isthmus, Chalcidice
- Neapoli, the former name of Alexandroupolis

=== Italy ===
- Naples, Italy, ancient name
- Neapolis (Apulia), an ancient city in Apulia, Italy
- Neapolis (Sardinia), an ancient city in southwestern Sardinia, Italy

=== Turkey ===
- Aurelia Neapolis, an ancient town in Caria, Asia Minor
- Neapolis (Bosphorus), an ancient town on the Bosphorus
- Neapolis (Caria), an ancient town in Asia Minor
- Neapolis (Ionia), an ancient town in Asia Minor
- Neapolis (Isauria), an ancient town and bishopric in Asia Minor
- Neapolis (Paphlagonia), an ancient town in Asia Minor, also called Neoklaudioupolis, Andrapa; Ottoman Gedegara, Köprü; modern Vezirköprü
- Neapolis (Pisidia), an ancient town and bishopric in Pisidia, Asia Minor
- Neapolis (Pontus), also known as Phazemon or Thermai Phazemoniton, an ancient town in Asia Minor
- Neapolis (Thracian Chersonese), Greek colony
- Neapolis, a name of Tripolis on the Meander

=== Middle East and Cyprus ===
- Neapolis or Flavia Neapolis, the ancient name of Nablus, Palestine
- A former name of Limassol (Lemesos), Cyprus; used in the Byzantine period
- Neapoli, Nicosia, a suburb of Nicosia, Cyprus

=== North America ===
- Neapolis, Alberta, a locality in Mountain View County, Alberta, Canada
- Neapolis, Ohio, an unincorporated municipality in Lucas County, Ohio, United States

=== Elsewhere ===
- Neapolis (Colchis), town of ancient Colchis, in the Caucasus
- Nabeul, Tunisia, originally Neapolis
- Mandelieu-la-Napoule, France, originally Neapolis
- Scythian Neapolis or Kermenchik, a Scythian town, near modern Simferopol, Ukraine

== Football ==
- Neapoli Stadium (Athens), a stadium used by Greek club Ionikos FC
- F.C. Neapolis, an Italian football club based in Mugnano di Napoli

== Music ==
- Néapolis (album) by Simple Minds

== See also ==
- Palaeopolis (disambiguation)
