= Neapolis (Apulia) =

Ancient city in Italy

Neapolis was a common name of ancient cities, for others see Neapoli (disambiguation)

Neapolis (Greek: Νεάπολις) meaning "New City", was an ancient city of Magna Graecia in Apulia, Italy, not mentioned by any ancient writer, but the existence of which is attested by its coins. There seems good reason to place it at Polignano a Mare, between Barium (modern Bari) and Egnatia (near modern Fasano), where numerous relics of antiquity have been discovered.

== See also ==
- List of ancient Greek cities
