= Aurelia Neapolis =

Town of ancient Caria

Coordinates: 37°41′25″N 28°23′52″E

Aurelia Neapolis, or Neapolis (Ancient Greek: Νεάπολις), was an inland town of ancient Caria, between Orthosia and Aphrodisias, at the foot of Mount Cadmus, in the neighbourhood of Harpasa. During Roman times, it bore the name of Aurelia Neapolis.

Its site is located near modern Inebolu, Turkey.
