= Raimundo Napolitano =

Italian painter

Raimundo Napolitano was an Italian painter of the Renaissance period. He was active in Naples during 1477. He painted frescoes for the church of S. Francesco di Chieri.
