= Neapolitan Republic =

Neapolitan Republic may refer to two different rebellions of Naples and its neighborhood against the king's rule:

- Neapolitan Republic (1647–1648)
- Parthenopean Republic (Neapolitan Republic of 1799)
