= Henrique Esteves da Veiga de Nápoles =

Portuguese noble

Henrique Esteves da Veiga de Nápoles, 1st Lord of the Honour of Molelos (1438–1502) was a Portuguese nobleman, privy counsellor and military officer, the eldest son of João Esteves da Veiga de Nápoles and his wife Leonor Anes de Vasconcelos.

As a wealthy land owner, he supplied the royal armies with a hundred swordsmen and over fifty horsemen during Afonso V's long-lasting wars with Castile, having also fought alongside him at the battle of Toro. In recognition of this support, the king granted him the further Lordships (Senhorios) of Botulho, Nandufe, Mata and Castanheira, having also appointed him a member of his privy council. He began the construction of the Palace (Paço) of Molelos, seat of the Lords of the Honour of Molelos, later Viscounts and Counts of Molelos.

== Marriage and children ==
Henrique Esteves da Veiga de Nápoles married Filipa Gomes de Gouveia, daughter of Fernão Nunes Cardoso, Lord of Gafanhão, and Leonor de Azevedo. They had:

- Fernão Nunes Esteves da Veiga, 1st Lord of the Honour of Nandufe, married to Brígida de Horta, born in Triana, Alenquer; had issue
- Henrique da Veiga de Nápoles, 2nd Lord of the Honour of Molelos
- Vasco Henriques Esteves da Veiga, married to Teresa Gomes de Quadros; had issue
- Petronilha Esteves, married to João Rameiro

== See also ==
- Nápoles (family)
