= Honour of Molelos =

The Honour of Molelos (Honra de Molelos, in Portuguese) was a major lordship in Portugal. It was founded c.1455 by João Esteves da Veiga de Nápoles, heir to a Portuguese branch of the Capetian House of Anjou, the Nápoles family, in the name of his eldest son, Henrique Esteves da Veiga de Nápoles. It would survive until the extinction of the Portuguese lordships after the Liberal triumph of 1834.

The Lords of Molelos were created Viscounts of Molelos by king John VI of Portugal in 1826 and later Counts of Molelos by Miguel I.

Their historical seat has been the Palace (Paço) of Molelos, near Tondela.
