= Guglielmo Marsili =

Italian water polo player

Personal information
- Nationality: Italian
- Born: 2 February 1946 (age 79); Naples, Italy

Sport
- Sport: Water polo

Guglielmo Marsili (born 2 February 1946) is an Italian water polo player. He competed in the men's tournament at the 1972 Summer Olympics.
