= Richard A. Napolitano =

American jurist and politician

Richard Napolitano

Personal details
- Born: September 7, 1916 Chicago, Illinois
- Died: January 31, 1988 (aged 71) Chicago, Illinois

Richard A. Napolitano (September 7, 1916 – January 31, 1988) was an American jurist and politician.

Born in Chicago, Illinois, Napolitano graduated from DePaul University College of Law. He ran his father's novelty business and served as an assistant state's attorney. From 1953 to 1963, Napolitano served in the Illinois House of Representatives as a Democrat. In 1963, Napolitano was elected municipal judge which automatically became Illinois circuit judges in 1964. In 1970, Napolitano was removed from office by the Illinois Courts Commission after pleading the Fifth Amendment about purchasing Illinois State Fair concession contracts under different names and then resold them for profit. Napolitano died in a hospital in Chicago, Illinois.
