= Neapolis (Colchis) =

Neapolis (Ancient Greek: Νεάπολις) was a town of Colchis, in the Caucasus, located south of Dioscurias, and north of Phasis, on the river Chobos or Chorsos.
