= Naples (disambiguation) =

Naples is a major city and province in Italy.

Naples may also refer to:

== Places ==
=== Italy ===
- Naples International Airport
- Port of Naples
- Duchy of Naples, a former duchy
- Gulf of Naples, the bay off the coast of Naples
- Kingdom of Naples, a former kingdom
- Metropolitan City of Naples
- Kingdom of Naples (Napoleonic), a former French client state

=== United States ===
- Naples, Long Beach, California, a neighborhood of Long Beach
- Naples, Santa Barbara County, California, an unincorporated area
- Naples, Florida, a city
  - Naples Airport (Florida)
  - Naples Historic District
  - Naples High School
- Naples, Idaho, an unincorporated community
- Naples, Illinois, a town
- Naples, Maine, a town
  - Naples (CDP), Maine, a census-designated place in the town
- Naples, New York, a town
  - Naples (village), New York, part of the town
- Naples, South Dakota, a town
- Naples, Texas, a city
- Naples, Utah, a city
- Naples, Wisconsin, a town
- Naples Creek, California
- Naples Reef, off the coast of Santa Barbara, California

=== Other places ===
- Naples, Alberta, Canada, a locality
- Naples, the Crusader name for the biblical city of Shechem based on its Roman name Neapolis, now rendered Nablus in Arabic

== People ==
- Al Naples (1926-2021), an American Major League Baseball shortstop
- Donna Naples, American physicist
- Nancy Naples (politician), member of the AMTRAK Board of Directors
- Nancy Naples (sociologist), American sociologist

== Other uses ==
- Epyc Naples, the first generation of AMD's Epyc line of server processors, codenamed Naples

== See also ==
- Neapoli (disambiguation)
- Johan van Napels (1556–1630), Dutch mayor of Haarlem
- National Association for Public Interest Law (NAPIL), original name of Equal Justice Works
