= Paolo Maria Napolitano =

Italian judge

Judge of the Constitutional Court of Italy
- In office 10 July 2006 – 10 July 2015
- Nominated by: Italian Parliament

Personal details
- Born: 3 October 1944 Rome, Italy
- Died: 21 March 2016 (aged 71)

Paolo Maria Napolitano (3 October 1944 – 21 March 2016) was an Italian judge. He was a Judge of the Constitutional Court of Italy between 10 July 2006 and 10 July 2015.

== Career ==
Napolitano was born in Rome on 3 October 1944. He was a judge on the Italian Council of State before being elected to the Constitutional Court by the Italian Parliament on 5 July 2006. Napolitano was sworn in four days later. He was Vice President of the Court between 30 July 2014 and 11 November 2014. His term as judge ended on 10 July 2015.

In 2009, Italian Prime Minister Silvio Berlusconi visited a dinner party at the house of Luigi Mazzella, a fellow judge at the Constitutional Court; Napolitano and Justice Minister Angelino Alfano were also present. At the time, an immunity bill which would affect Berlusconi was under discussion in the Constitutional Court. The gathering provoked outrage among political opponents of Berlusconi, stating that the impartiality of the court was compromised.

Napolitano was made Knight Grand Cross in the Order of Merit of the Italian Republic on 10 July 2006.

Napolitano died on 21 March 2016, aged 71.
