= Neapolitan =

Neapolitan means of or pertaining to Naples, a city in Italy; or to:

== Geography and history ==
- Province of Naples, a province in the Campania region of southern Italy that includes the city
- Duchy of Naples, in existence during the Early and High Middle Ages
- Kingdom of Naples
- Kingdom of the Two Sicilies
- Neapolitan Republic (disambiguation), various entities
- Neapolitan War
- Naples, Florida, which took its name from the Italian city

== Music ==
- Music of Naples or Neapolitan dance
- Canzone Napoletana or Neapolitan song
- Neapolitan School of music
- Neapolitan chord (also known as Neapolitan sixth), the first inversion of a major chord built on the lowered second (supertonic) scale degree
- Neapolitan scale
- Neapolitan mass, a cantata-style mass

== Food ==
- Neapolitan cuisine, a historical cuisine of Naples that date back to the Greco-Roman period to the modern days
- Neapolitan ice cream, a mixture of chocolate, vanilla, and strawberry ice cream side-by-side in the same container
- Neapolitan pizza, the original variety of pizza made according to strict rules
- Neapolitan ragù, one of the two most famous varieties of meat sauces and a speciality of Naples
- Neapolitan sauce, a basic tomato-based sauce derived from Italian cuisine
- Neapolitan wafer, an Austrian wafer and chocolate-cream sandwich biscuit
- Neapolitans (chocolate), individually wrapped square/rectangular pieces of chocolate

== Other ==
- Neapolitan language, the language of southern continental Italy, named after the Kingdom of Naples
- Neapolitan piastra, a currency of the mainland part of the former Kingdom of the Two Sicilies
- Neapolitan horse, an extinct horse breed formerly bred in Naples
- Neapolitan Mastiff, a large, ancient breed of dog
- Neapolitan Novels, a four-part series by Elena Ferrante
- Neopolitan, a fictional character from RWBY

== See also ==
- Napolitan (disambiguation), various meanings including the name of a pasta dish, which is popular in Japan
- Nápoles
