= Viscount of Molelos =

Viscount of Molelos (Portuguese: Visconde de Molelos) is a Portuguese title of nobility, created in 1826 by John VI of Portugal, for General Francisco de Paula Vieira da Silva de Tovar, 11th Lord of the Honour of Molelos and 1st Baron of Molelos, as a reward for his role in the Portuguese invasion of the Banda Oriental.

Although Francisco's descendant continued the title for a short while, the only daughter of António died in infancy and his closest living relatives (the descendants of his great-aunt Josefa Vieira da Silva de Tovar) continued as pretenders to the title.

== List of viscounts ==
1. Francisco de Paula Vieira da Silva de Tovar
2. António Vieira de Tovar de Magalhães e Albuquerque, the only serving grandson of Francisco, but in 1860, exiled king Miguel I created the 2nd Viscount of Molelos, 1st Count of Molelos and 1st Marquess of Belavista. Yet, these titles were, however, never legally validated.
