= Simão Luís da Veiga =

Portuguese bullfighting horseman and farmer (1903-1959)

Simão Luís da Veiga Jr. OC (born in Montemor-o-Novo, Lavre, May 22/June 1903 — died in Caldas da Rainha, August 19, 1959) was a celebrated bullfighting horseman and farmer from Portugal.

== Early life and education ==
He completed the commercial course at the Academic School of Lisbon and from a young age dedicated himself to Bullfighting, following in the footsteps of his father, the naturalist painter and bullfighter Simão Luís da Veiga.

He was the paternal uncle of Luís Miguel da Veiga and great-uncle of Mafalda Veiga.

== Career ==
He debuted in public at just 12 years old, in the Bullring of Montemor-o-Novo, in 1915, and took the alternative as a Bullfighting Horseman on June 4, 1922, in the Monumental Campo Pequeno, having his father, Simão Luís da Veiga, as his Godfather.

Since then, he has fought in all the rings of mainland Portugal, the Azores and Madeira, Angola and Mozambique, as well as in many rings of Spain, France, Venezuela and Mexico. In the latter country, he debuted in the Plaza México, the largest bullring in the world, in 1938.

In the 1927 season, he was the Portuguese horseman who performed the most in Spain and was, moreover, the first to be awarded an ear in Las Ventas. Also in Spain, and accompanied by his father, he took part in the Royal Bullfight of Barcelona, in the Monumental Bullring, organized and offered by King Alfonso XIII of Spain to King Victor Emmanuel III of Italy, who presented them with cigarette cases enriched with the Arms of the Italian Crown.

He first married in Lisbon, on December 1, 1927, to Maria Helena de Sant'Ana Soares Ventura (Lisbon, Santos-o-Velho, May 21, 1910 - Lisbon, July 23, 2001), the only daughter of Henrique Soares Ventura (Montijo, Montijo, February 28, 1862 - Lisbon, October 4, 1934) and his second wife Cristina de Jesus de Sant'Ana, from whom he divorced without issue.

Considered one of the most renowned Portuguese Horsemen, he also fought on foot, but is remembered in the history of horseback bullfighting for having started his career in the era of corridas and making the transition with João Branco Núncio to the fight of the pure bull, allowing the execution of frontal moves, particularly from the late 1930s. He achieved many successes, rivaled the main horsemen and rejoneadores of his time, in addition to João Branco Núncio, the Spaniards António Cañero and Álvaro Domecq Díez, and cultivated many admirers, among them the Nobel laureate Ernest Hemingway who, recalling the bullfights that excited him in his youth in Spain, dedicates a passage to him in The Nick Adams Stories.

He married a second time, civilly, to Ausenda Coelho Guião (Redondo, Redondo, March 30, 1916 - ?), daughter of Manuel Coelho Guião and his wife Deolinda de Vasconcelos, without issue. He was an Honorary Citizen of Lourenço Marques and was awarded the Medals of Italo Balbo and the President of Mexico Manuel Ávila Camacho and as an Officer of the Military Order of Christ, on March 12, 1947. Manuel Conde took the alternative as a bullfighting horseman in Lisbon, in the Campo Pequeno Bullring, on May 18, 1947, having Simão da Veiga as godfather. The brothers Luís Miguel and José Athayde also received the iron of the alternative from the hands of Simão da Veiga, in the same Lisbon ring.

== Death ==
Simão da Veiga performed for the last time in the traditional bullfight of August 15, at the Bullring of Caldas da Rainha, in 1959, suffering a myocardial infarction during the fight that would lead to his death four days later.
