= Neapolis (Bosphorus) =

Town in ancient Thrace

Coordinates: 41°07′19″N 29°03′35″E

Neapolis (Ancient Greek: Νεάπολις), was a coastal town on the European side of the Bosphorus in ancient Thrace. It may also have been called Comarodes.

Its site is located near modern Yeniköy, near Istanbul, Turkey.
