= Il Napoli =

il Napoli
- Front page, 2009-04-21
- Type: Daily newspaper (from Monday to Saturday)
- Format: Compact
- Owner: E Polis
- Founded: December 6, 2006
- Language: Italian
- Headquarters: Naples, Italy
- Website: www.ilnapoli.sm

il Napoli is an Italian local newspaper owned by the San Marino-based publishing company E Polis and based in Naples, Italy.

Although it is not a free newspaper, 70% of copies are distributed free near very busy locations like universities, railway stations and airports, shopping centres and is regularly sold at newsstands.
