= Donna Naples =

American neutrino physicist

Donna Lynne Naples is an American neutrino physicist whose research involves both the use of particle accelerators to generate neutrino beams, and the use of underground neutrino detectors to study cosmic neutrinos and neutrino oscillation. She is a professor in the Department of Physics & Astronomy at the University of Pittsburgh.

== Education and career ==
Naples majored in physics as an undergraduate at the University of Pittsburgh, graduating in 1986. She went to the University of Maryland, College Park for doctoral study in physics, and completed her Ph.D. there in 1993. Her dissertation, A-Dependence of Photoproduced Jets and Comparison with Hadroproduction, was jointly supervised by Chia-Cheh Chang and Harry D. Holmgren, based on research at Fermilab.

She became a postdoctoral researcher on the NuTeV experiment at Fermilab from 1993 to 1995, when she took a faculty position at Kansas State University. She moved to her present position at the University of Pittsburgh in 1999.

Naples has been part of experimental physics collaborations including NuTeV, NuMI, and COSMOS at Fermilab, the NOvA and MicroBooNE neutrino oscillation experiments at Fermilab, and the Deep Underground Neutrino Experiment.

== Recognition ==
Naples was elected as a Fellow of the American Physical Society (APS) in 2018, after a nomination from the APS Division of Particles and Fields, "for advances in the techniques of flux and cross-section determinations in the current and upcoming generation of accelerator-based neutrino experiments and fundamental contributions to neutrino event generators".
