= João Esteves da Veiga de Nápoles =

Portuguese nobleman and Minister-Counselor

João Esteves da Veiga de Nápoles (1397–1461) was a Portuguese nobleman and Minister-Counselor, the eldest (and probably only) son of Leonardo Esteves de Nápoles and his wife Margarida Anes Afonso. He was the 1st Lord (Senhor) of Salvaterra de Magos, Montargil, Vacariça and Vila Nova de Monsarros.

De Nápoles distinguished himself as a diplomat and later as member of the Privy Council of King John I of Portugal. Later in life, de Nápoles founded the Honour of Molelos, a major lordship which would survive until the Liberal triumph of 1848.

== Marriage and children ==
De Nápoles married Leonor Anes de Vasconcelos, daughter of Dom João Rodrigues de Vasconcelos, the Chief Governor (Mordomo-Mór) of King Afonso IV, and wife Constança Soares. They had one son, Henrique Esteves da Veiga de Nápoles, and two daughters, Catarina Anes da Veiga, first wife of Pedro Rodrigues Juzarte, and Margarida, wife of Vasco Pimentel and Luís Pereira.
