= CN Posillipo =

- Founded: 1925
- Based in: Naples
- Colors: Green and red
- President: Stefano Postiglione
- Manager: Giuseppe Porzio
- Website: cnposillipo.org

Circolo Nautico Posillipo (or Posillipo Nautical Club in english) is a Neapolitan multi-sports club established in 1925, which focuses primarily on water sports.

== History ==
The club was founded on 15 July 1925 by 12 dissident members of the Circolo Canottieri Napoli. Known at the time as the Circolo Nautico Giovinezza, his first president was Prince Andrea Carafa D’Andria, while the honorary president was Benito Mussolini. The club burgee was modelled on the Fascist pennant.

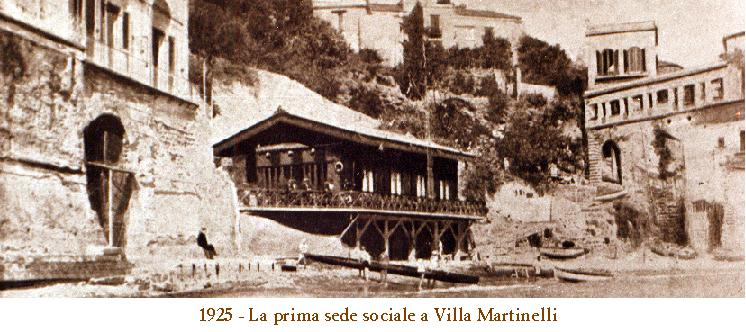
The first headquarter of the club at Villa Martinelli in 1925

Its first headquarters was a wooden chalet on Via Posillipo, near Piazza San Luigi, owned by the Martinelli family. Whilst the 12 founders, needing sports equipment, each contributed 5000 lire to purchase a number of rowing boats. The following year, due to limited space, the club purchased a hangar on a port in the gulf of Naples where the first training sessions took place. Subsequently, the club began to move towards the centre of Naples in the east, they transported the hangar by sea and placed their headquarter to its current location thanks to the city’s council, which leased Villa Mon Plaisir to the club. Then a tennis court and a ballroom were constructed there, enabling the club to host guests on the occasion of high social events.

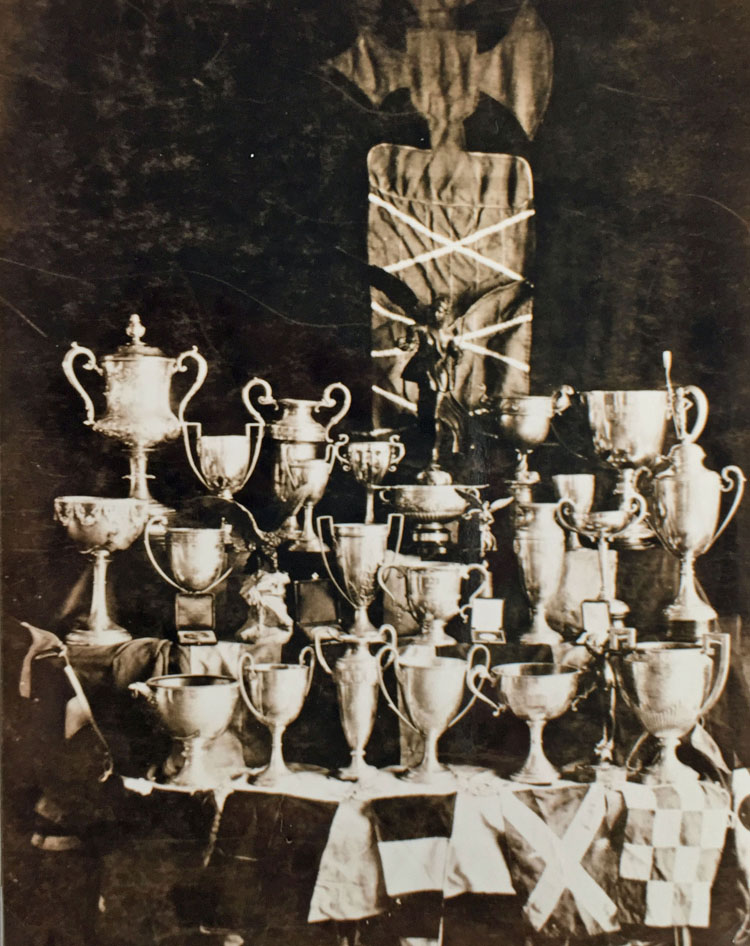
The club’s flag whit the rescued trophies

With the fall of Fascism in 1943, the club suffered numerous acts of vandalism, until it was requisitioned by the Allies. The members managed to save only the cups and trophies. Thanks to the mediation of a Serbian officer who frequented the club’s tennis court, the club was given another opportunity, on condition that members who were openly fascist were expelled and that the colours and the club’s name were changed. The new organisation took the name Yacht Club Canottieri Posillipo, its burgee, which had previously featured a black background with a gold fasces, was changed to resemble the Union Jack but with green instead of blue. In 1956, the name was changed to Circolo Nautico Posillipo.

In the 1960s, under the presidency of Gaetano Cerbone, the club expanded further, partly thanks to funds allocated for theOlympic Games. The foundation stone was laid on 16 August 1960, in the presence of the President of the Italian Republic Giovanni Gronchil, and Giulio Andreotti. Following the renovation, the club became an important location for the jet set, frequented by, amongst others,Sophia Loren, Totò, Giovanni Leone, Walter Chiari, Gina Lollobrigida, Raimondo Vianello, Sandra Mondaini, Renato Rascel and Carlo Campanini.

In 1967, Gaetano Cerbone president of the club since previous decade, stepped down from presidency, partly due to a legal case involving other local clubs in an investigation into gambling, which was widespread at the time. Once the period of administration had passed, the subsequent presidents gave the club a new direction, what had until then been an exclusive club for members to socialise in their spare time was transformed into a ground for champions who went on to make their mark in Italy and around the world.

== Colours and symbols ==
The club’s flag and burgee have a green background, symbolising the hope of rebirth, featuring a red Latin cross and a red St Andrew’s cross, both edged in white. The club shirt has a green background with the burgee in the centre of the chest and red stripes at the sides.

== Infrastructures ==
The CN Posillipo facilities are located in: Naples at Via Posillipo 5 (main headquarters) and Corso Vittorio Emanuele (the Carlo Poerio swimming pool), whilst the rowing sports centre is situated at Lago Patria.

The main headquarters is spread over two levels at different elevations, the first of which is at sea level. It comprises a covered area of 1,743 square metres housing the fencing, canoeing, rowing and sailing sections as well as a range of facilities such as the kitchen, bar, toilets and changing rooms. An open-air annexe covering 12,374 square metres houses the solarium, a 13-metre by 25-metre swimming pool and a 1,614-square-metre marina. In total, the area comprising the harbour, the stretch of water in front of it and the cliff covers a surface area of 8,152 square metres.

== Disciplines ==
The Circolo Nautico Posillipo organises competitions in aquathlon, duathlon, triathlon, winter triathlon, marathon canoeing, canoe polo, sprint, fencing, water polo, lifesaving, swimming, open-water swimming (long-distance), indoor rowing, coastal rowing and rowing.

=== Canoe polo ===
The canoe polo section is one of the most successful teams in Italy, in both the men’s and women’s divisions. The men’s team has won 7 league titles, 8 Italian Cups and 2 European titles, whilst the women’s team has won 8 league titles, 3 Italian Cups and 2 European titles.

=== Rowing ===
The rowing section is the club’s most successful and has been in existence since the club’s foundation. As of 2020, the red-and-green athletes have won 202 Italian titles, 45 golds, 30 silvers, 32 bronzes, 10 Montù Cups and 22 Lysistrata Cups.

=== Water polo ===
The water polo section, which has also been in existence since the club’s foundation, is one of the successful teams in Italy, known for having won 11 league titles and seven European titles.

=== Fencing ===
The fencing section was established in 1961, as the first non-aquatic sport. Notable fencers who came through the club’s youth programme include Sandro Cuomo, Raffaello Caserta, Ferdinando Meglio and Massimo Cavaliere. With one of the best-known fencing halls in Italy and Europe, the roll of honour for Neapolitan fencers includes 7 gold, 5 silver and 9 bronze medals at the World Championships, 3 golds, 2 silvers and 4 bronzes at the European Championships, 5 golds, 5 silvers and 8 bronzes in the World Cup, 4 silvers and 1 bronze at the Mediterranean Games, 9 titles at the Italian Championships, as well as numerous successes at youth level.

=== Sailing ===
The sailing section has been in existence since the club’s foundation. Following the first few decades, during which athletes made their mark in regional competitions, in the 1960s – thanks to the new marina built to host the Finn and Flying Dutchman classes at the Rome Olympics – sailing experienced a surge in popularity amongst enthusiasts, to the extent that between 1956 and 1962, sailors from Posillipo excelled at the European Lightning Championships, winning one gold, three silver and two bronze medals

== Titles ==
The C.N.P. is one of the most laureated Italian clubs. By 2020, across various disciplines, the club has won the following:

=== achievements ===
- Italian titles: 458
- League titles: 38
- Gold medals: 103 (across Olympic Games, World and European Championships)
- Silver medals: 90
- Bronze medals: 119
- Olympic Games appearances: 65
- Player of the Year trophies: 19
- National and international cups: Several dozen

=== Domestic competitions ===
- Serie A1
  - Winners: 11 (1985, 1986, 1988, 1989, 1993, 1994, 1995, 1996, 2000, 2001, 2004)
- Coppa Italia
  - Winners: 1 (1987)

=== European competitions ===
- LEN Champions League / Euroleague
  - Winners: 3 (1997, 1998, 2005)
- LEN Euro Cup
  - Winners: 1 (2015)
- LEN Super Cup
  - Winners: 1 (2005)
- Cup Winners' Cup
  - Winners: 2 (1988, 2003)

== Famous waterpolo players ==
- (Hungary) Tamás Kásás
- (Italy) Fabio Bencivenga
- (Italy) Fabrizio Buonocore
- (Italy) Fabio Galasso
- (Italy) Andrea Scotti Galletta
- (Italy) Fabio Galasso
- (Italy) Valentino Gallo
- (Italy) Luigi Di Costanzo
- (Italy) Antracite Lignano
- (Italy) Mino Marsili
- (Italy) Domenico Mattiello
- (Italy) Massimiliano Migliaccio
- (Italy) Franco Pizzabiocca
- (Italy) Francesco Postiglione
- (Italy) Alfredo Riccitiello
- (Italy) Paride Saccoia
- (Italy) Zeno Bertoli
- (Italy) Vincenzo Renzuto Iodice
- (Italy) Nicola Cuccovillo
- (Italy) Lorenzo Briganti
- (Italy) Fabio Baraldi
- (Italy) Gianluigi Foglio
- (Italy) Giuseppe Porzio
- (Italy) Franco Porzio
- (Italy) Luca Marziali
- (Italy) Tommaso Negri
- (Italy) Carlo Silipo
- (Italy) Dario Vasaturo
- (Italy) Fabio Violetti
- (Croatia) Ratko Štritof
- (Croatia) Andro Bušlje
- (Montenegro) Nikola Janović
- (Montenegro) Darko Brgulian
- (Montenegro) Boris Zloković
- (Montenegro) Filip Klikovac
- (Montenegro) Aleksandar Radovic
- (Serbia) Dušan Popović
- (Serbia) Milan Tadić
- (Serbia) Vanja Udovičić
- (Greece) Angelos Vlachopoulos
- (Italy) Fabio Violetti
- (Montenegro) Meldin Hadžić
