= Stephen of Durazzo =

Italian Nobleman (1328–1380)

Stephen of Durazzo (1328–1380) was an Italian nobleman.

== Biography ==
He was the fourth son of John, Duke of Durazzo, and second wife Agnes of Périgord. He is therefore the nephew of King Charles II of Naples and an agnatic descendant of King Louis VIII of France, father of Saint-Louis.

He became a crusader in Portugal, where in 1340 he participated in the Reconquista and, alongside his cousin Alfonso IV of Portugal, participated in the Battle of Río Salado against the Saracens.

In Portugal, he is known as Estêvão de Nápoles (Stephen of Naples). He married and had a son, João Esteves, who, with Catarina Esteves, had an illegitimate son, Leonardo Esteves, married to Margarida Anes, thus giving rise to the Portuguese family of "de Nápoles" or "da Veiga de Nápoles" (of Naples). This genealogy is questioned by some lineage scholars.

== See also ==
- Naples
- Duchy of Durazzo (Angevin)
- Capetian House of Anjou
