= Nápoles =

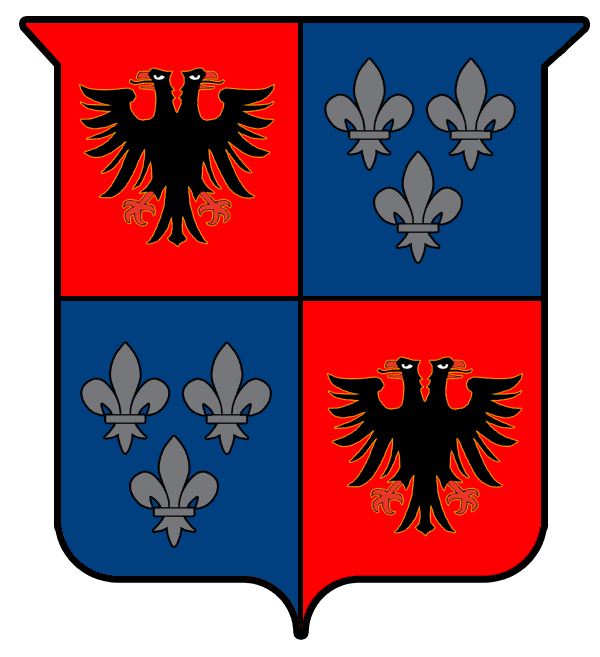
Coat of arms of the Nápoles family, bearing the double-headed eagle of the Kingdom of Albania and the fleurs-de-lys of the House of Anjou

The Nápoles family (Portuguese for Naples) is the name of a Portuguese noble family, whose roots lie in the Kingdom of Naples.

== History ==
A claimed secondary branch of the royal Capetian House of Anjou, of the kings of Naples, the Nápoles descend from Stephen of Durazzo (a claimed younger son of John, Duke of Durazzo, ruler of the Kingdom of Albania, and grandson of Charles II of Naples) who moved to Portugal during the first half of the 14th century to join the ranks of King Afonso IV at the battle of Salado. It has been noted that this might be a posterior fabrication, for there is no notice of any such legitimate or bastard son of a Prince of Naples.

The main branch of the family in Portugal is that of the Lords of the Honour of Molelos, created Viscounts of Molelos by King John VI of Portugal and later raised to Counts of Molelos by King Miguel I, in recognition of their support for the traditionalist faction during the Liberal Wars. Among its members are Leonardo Estêvão de Nápoles, Henrique Esteves da Veiga de Nápoles and Francisco de Paula de Tovar e Nápoles, 1st Viscount of Molelos.

== See also ==
- Napolitano
