= GS Apollon Smyrnis =

Greek multi-sports club

- Full name: Gymnasticos Syllogos Apollon Smyrnis; Γυμναστικός Σύλλογος Απόλλων Σμύρνης
- Nickname: Elafra Taxiarchia (Light Brigade)
- Founded: 1891; 135 years ago
- League: A1 Ethniki Water Polo
- Colours: Navy blue, white
- Anthem: Apollon
- Chairman: Panagiotis Katavelos
- Titles: European Titles: 1
- Website: apollongs.gr

GS Apollon Smyrnis, full name Gymnasticos Syllogos Apollon Smyrnis, literally Gymnastics Society Apollon of Smyrna (Greek: Γυμναστικός Σύλλογος Απόλλων Σμύρνης/ Γ.Σ. Απόλλων Σμύρνης) is a Greek multi-sport club based in Athens. Apollon originally was founded in Smyrna in 1891 and moved to Athens in 1922 after Asia Minor Disaster. The club has got departments in football, basketball, volleyball, waterpolo and other sports. The most successful section is the football team with long presence in Alpha Ethniki. The home stadium of the club is in Rizoupoli, a district of Athens. The club's colours are blue and white and its emblem is the ancient God Apollo.

== History ==
=== Apollon in Smyrna (1891–1922) ===
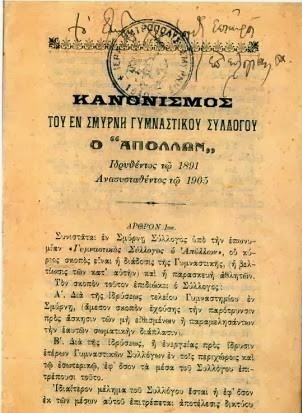
Founding certificate of Apollon Smyrnis 1905

Apollon was founded in 1891 and was re-instated in 1905. The first members from the club belonged earlier to Orpheas Smyrnis, the ancestor of Panionios. The metropolitan bishop of Smyrna Chrysostomos was among the founders of Apollon. In 1894, three years after its foundation, Apollon acquired its own stadium. A few years later the stadium moved in the Smyrni's district of Agios Tryfonas. In 1904, Apollon organised the Apollonian Games, the annual athletics games in Smyrna. Athletes of all the nations in Smyrna take part in the Games besides Turks. The football team of Apollon was founded in 1910 and it became the most popular and successful team of the club.

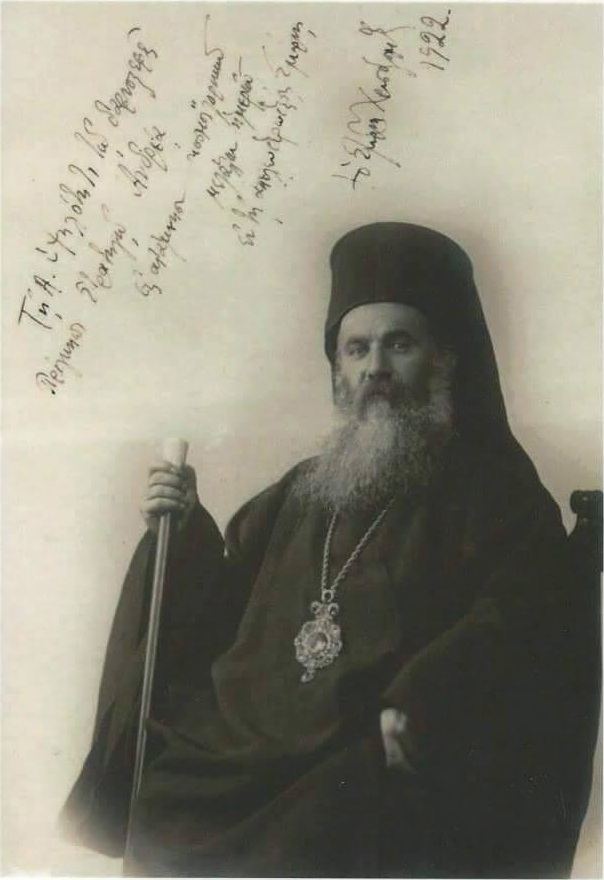
Chrysostomos of Smyrna

=== Apollon in Athens (1922-today) ===
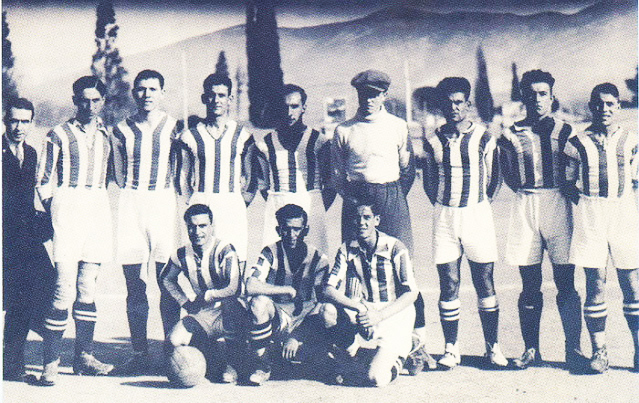
The football team of Apollon in 1924

In 1922, Apollon moved to Athens as result of Asia Minor Disaster and the expulsion of Greek population from Asia Minor. The club originally settled in Columns of the Olympian Zeus. In 1923, Apollon moved to Rouf, a district in the west of Athens. In 1946 the Greek Railway Company bought the area of Apollon in Rouf. The money from the selling was used for the buying an area in Rizoupoli where the new stadium of Apollon was built. The stadium started to be built in 1947 and it inaugurated in 1948. In 2003, the stadium was named Georgios Kamaras after the name of the notable player of Apollon. Apollon was two times the finalist of the championship. Other achievements were the third place in the championship of 1963, and the presence in the final of the Greek Football Cup in 1996 when they were defeated by AEK Athens. The Volleyball and Water Polo sections of Apollon have reached up to second division in their sports. In current season Volleyball and Water Polo team play in A2 Ethniki (2nd-tier). The basketball team had played in Beta Ethniki in 1991–92 and 1992–93 seasons and now it plays in Gamma Ethniki (4th tier).

== Departments ==
- Apollon Smyrnis F.C., Football club that plays in Gamma Ethniki (2026–27)
- Apollon Smyrnis B.C., Basketball club that plays in Β league (2016–17)
- Apollon Smyrnis V.C., Volleyball club that plays in A2 Ethniki Volleyball (2015–16)
- Apollon Smyrnis Water Polo, Water polo club that plays in A2 Ethniki Water Polo (2015–16)

== Sport facilities ==
The football team plays in Giorgos Kamaras Stadium in Rizoupoli. The stadium belongs to Apollon and was built in 1948. The basketball and volleyball team play in Rizoupoli indoor arena and the Water polo team plays in natatorium of Galatsi.

== Honours ==
Apollon men's football

- Panhellenic Championship
  - Finalists (2): 1938, 1948
- Greek Football Cup
  - Finalists (1): 1996
- Smyrna championship
  - Winners (6): 1917, 1918, 1919, 1920, 1921, 1922

Apollon waterpolo

- LEN Challenger Cup
  - Winners (1): 2023

Apollon boxing

- Greek Championship, Men:
  - Winners (1): 1956

== Notable supporters ==
- Giorgos Afroudakis, former water polo player
- Zachos Afroudakis, former water polo player
- Giorgos Arkoulis, author
- Manolis Anagnostakis, distinguished doctor
- Chrysostomos of Smyrna, Greek-orthodox bishop in Smyrna, Asia Minor until 1922
- Giorgos Georgiou, former sports journalist
- Michalis Michalakis, former football player
- Giorgos Kamaras, former football player
- Giorgos Karatzaferis, former politician, journalist
- Michalis Michalakis, former football player
- Panagiotis Monemvasiotis, entrepreneur
- Alekos Papadopoulos, politician, former Former Minister of Finance
- Stamatis Velis, ship owner, former Apollon FC owner
- Tolis Voskopoulos, singer
