= 2024–25 European Aquatics Euro Cup group stage =

Tournament information
- Sport: Water polo
- Dates: 10 October–5 December 2024
- Teams: 16
- Website: Official website

The 2024–25 European Aquatics Euro Cup group stage is played between 10 October and 5 December 2024 to determine the eight teams advancing to the Eighth finals of the 2024–25 European Aquatics Euro Cup.

== Format ==
The 16 teams were place into four groups of four. In each group, teams will play against each other home-and-away in a round-robin format. The top two teams in each group advanced to the Eighth finals.

Teams are ranked according to points (3 points for a win, 2 points for a penalty shootout win, 1 point for a penalty shootout loss, 0 points for a loss), and if tied on points, the following tiebreaking criteria are applied, in the order given, to determine the rankings:

- Points in head-to-head matches among tied teams;
- Goal difference in head-to-head matches among tied teams;
- Goals scored in head-to-head matches among tied teams;
- Goal difference in all group matches;
- Goals scored in all group matches.

== Draw ==
The draw took place on the 30 September 2024 in Zagreb, Croatia. The eight teams in pot 1 won their group in the qualification round, while the 8 runners-up in the qualification round are in pot 2. Teams in bold indicate who advanced.

Pot 1	Pot 2
(Serbia) **VK Šabac** (Italy) **AN Brescia** (Spain) **CN Barcelona** (Croatia) **HAVK Mladost Zagreb** (Hungary) Szolnoki Dozsa-Praktiker (Croatia) **Jug AO Dubrovnik** (Italy) **CC Ortigia** (Hungary) **BVSC-Manna ABC**	(France) Team Strasbourg (Hungary) Endo Plus Service Honvéd (Greece) NC Vouliagmeni (Greece) GS Apollon Smyrnis (Greece) Panionios GSS (Greece) Panathinaikos (Germany) ASC Duisburg (Italy) **Recco Waterpolo**

== Groups ==
=== Group A ===
Pos	Team	Pld	W	PSW	PSL	L	GF	GA	GD	Pts	Qualification	(Italy) BRE	(Croatia) JUG	(Greece) APO	(France) STR
1	(Italy) AN Brescia	6	4	1	0	1	72	67	+5	**14**	Eighth-finals	—	12–10	16–15 (Note: Match ended 11–11. AN Brescia won 5–4 on penalties.)	11–9
2	(Croatia) Jug AO Dubrovnik	6	3	0	0	3	79	73	+6	**9**	Eighth-finals	15–11	—	14–10	15–11
3	(Greece) GS Apollon Smyrnis	6	2	0	1	3	70	71	−1	**7**		9–11	13–12	—	17–11
4	(France) Team Strasbourg	6	2	0	0	4	72	82	−10	**6**		13–16	16–13	12–10	—

Source: European Aquatics

10 October 2024; 19:00	Report	**Jug AO Dubrovnik** (Croatia)	**14**–10	(Greece) GS Apollon Smyrnis	Bazen u Gružu, Dubrovnik; Referees: Rajmund Fodor (HUN), Ruben Sap (NED)
10 October 2024; 19:00	Report	Score by quarters: **4**–1, 2–2, **6**–2, 2–**5**			Bazen u Gružu, Dubrovnik; Referees: Rajmund Fodor (HUN), Ruben Sap (NED)
10 October 2024; 19:00	Report	Herceg, Krzic 3	**Goals**	Bogdanovic 5	Bazen u Gružu, Dubrovnik; Referees: Rajmund Fodor (HUN), Ruben Sap (NED)

10 October 2024; 20:00	Report	**AN Brescia** (Italy)	**11**–9	(France) Team Strasbourg	Mompiano Swimming Center, Brescia; Referees: Alexandru-Andrei Mustata (ROU), Peter de Jong (NED)
10 October 2024; 20:00	Report	Score by quarters: 2–2, 3–**4**, **3**–2, **3**–1			Mompiano Swimming Center, Brescia; Referees: Alexandru-Andrei Mustata (ROU), Peter de Jong (NED)
10 October 2024; 20:00	Report	Balzarini 4	**Goals**	Misic, Popadic 3	Mompiano Swimming Center, Brescia; Referees: Alexandru-Andrei Mustata (ROU), Peter de Jong (NED)

17 October 2024; 20:00	Report	**Team Strasbourg** (France)	**16**–13	(Croatia) Jug AO Dubrovnik	Piscine de la Kibitzenau, Strasbourg; Referees: Andreja Stanojevic (SRB), Philip Uhlig (GER)
17 October 2024; 20:00	Report	Score by quarters: 5–5, 2–**3**, **5**–2, **4**–3			Piscine de la Kibitzenau, Strasbourg; Referees: Andreja Stanojevic (SRB), Philip Uhlig (GER)
17 October 2024; 20:00	Report	Popadic 8	**Goals**	Krzic, Žuvela 4	Piscine de la Kibitzenau, Strasbourg; Referees: Andreja Stanojevic (SRB), Philip Uhlig (GER)

17 October 2024; 21:00	Report	GS Apollon Smyrnis (Greece)	9–**11**	(Italy) **AN Brescia**	Athens, Greece; Referees: Jaume Teixido (ESP), Norbert Ercse (HUN)
17 October 2024; 21:00	Report	Score by quarters: 2–**4**, **2**–0, 3–**4**, 2–**3**			Athens, Greece; Referees: Jaume Teixido (ESP), Norbert Ercse (HUN)
17 October 2024; 21:00	Report	Bogdanovic 3	**Goals**	Ferrero, Irving 3	Athens, Greece; Referees: Jaume Teixido (ESP), Norbert Ercse (HUN)

31 October 2024; 20:00	Report	**AN Brescia** (Italy)	**12**–10	(Croatia) Jug AO Dubrovnik	Mompiano Swimming Center, Brescia; Referees: Gyorgy Kun (HUN), Carlos Juan Colominas (ESP)
31 October 2024; 20:00	Report	Score by quarters: 2–2, **3**–2, **4**–2, 3–**4**			Mompiano Swimming Center, Brescia; Referees: Gyorgy Kun (HUN), Carlos Juan Colominas (ESP)
31 October 2024; 20:00	Report	Balzarini 4	**Goals**	Jokovic, Pavlic 3	Mompiano Swimming Center, Brescia; Referees: Gyorgy Kun (HUN), Carlos Juan Colominas (ESP)

31 October 2024; 20:00	Report	**Team Strasbourg** (France)	**12**–10	(Greece) GS Apollon Smyrnis	Piscine de la Kibitzenau, Strasbourg; Referees: Rajmund Fodor (HUN), Veselin Miskovic (MNE)
31 October 2024; 20:00	Report	Score by quarters: 3–3, **3**–2, 2–**3**, **4**–2			Piscine de la Kibitzenau, Strasbourg; Referees: Rajmund Fodor (HUN), Veselin Miskovic (MNE)
31 October 2024; 20:00	Report	Popadic 3	**Goals**	Troulos 3	Piscine de la Kibitzenau, Strasbourg; Referees: Rajmund Fodor (HUN), Veselin Miskovic (MNE)

14 November 2024; 19:30	Report	**GS Apollon Smyrnis** (Greece)	**13**–12	(Croatia) Jug AO Dubrovnik	Athens, Greece; Referees: Pau Segurana (ESP), Norbert Ercse (HUN)
14 November 2024; 19:30	Report	Score by quarters: **5**–2, 3–3, 1–**3**, 4–4			Athens, Greece; Referees: Pau Segurana (ESP), Norbert Ercse (HUN)
14 November 2024; 19:30	Report	Bogdanovic 4	**Goals**	Žuvela 3	Athens, Greece; Referees: Pau Segurana (ESP), Norbert Ercse (HUN)

14 November 2024; 20:00	Report	Team Strasbourg (France)	13–**16**	(Italy) **AN Brescia**	Piscine de la Kibitzenau, Strasbourg; Referees: Jaume Teixido (ESP), Tamas Kovacs-Csatlos (HUN)
14 November 2024; 20:00	Report	Score by quarters: 3–**5**, 5–5, 2–**4**, **3**–2			Piscine de la Kibitzenau, Strasbourg; Referees: Jaume Teixido (ESP), Tamas Kovacs-Csatlos (HUN)
14 November 2024; 20:00	Report	Popadic 3	**Goals**	Balzarini 4	Piscine de la Kibitzenau, Strasbourg; Referees: Jaume Teixido (ESP), Tamas Kovacs-Csatlos (HUN)

21 November 2024; 19:00	Report	**Jug AO Dubrovnik** (Croatia)	**15**–11	(France) Team Strasbourg	Bazen u Gružu, Dubrovnik; Referees: Xavier F. Buch (ESP), Rajmund Fodor (HUN)
21 November 2024; 19:00	Report	Score by quarters: **5**–2, **3**–1, 3–3, 4–**5**			Bazen u Gružu, Dubrovnik; Referees: Xavier F. Buch (ESP), Rajmund Fodor (HUN)
21 November 2024; 19:00	Report	Žuvela 4	**Goals**	Popadic 4	Bazen u Gružu, Dubrovnik; Referees: Xavier F. Buch (ESP), Rajmund Fodor (HUN)

21 November 2024; 20:00	Report	**AN Brescia** (Italy)	**16**–15 (PSO)	(Greece) GS Apollon Smyrnis	Mompiano Swimming Center, Brescia; Referees: Sinisa Matijasevic (MNE), Peter de Jong (NED)
21 November 2024; 20:00	Report	Score by quarters: **4**–3, 2–**3**, 2–2, 3–3 PSO: **5**–4			Mompiano Swimming Center, Brescia; Referees: Sinisa Matijasevic (MNE), Peter de Jong (NED)
21 November 2024; 20:00	Report	Bogdanovic 4	**Goals**	Dolce, Irving 3	Mompiano Swimming Center, Brescia; Referees: Sinisa Matijasevic (MNE), Peter de Jong (NED)

5 December 2024; 19:00	Report	**Jug AO Dubrovnik** (Croatia)	**15**–11	(Italy) AN Brescia	Bazen u Gružu, Dubrovnik; Referees: Tamas Kovacs-Csatlos (HUN), David Gomez (ESP)
5 December 2024; 19:00	Report	Score by quarters: 5–5, 2–**4**, **3**–1, **5**–1			Bazen u Gružu, Dubrovnik; Referees: Tamas Kovacs-Csatlos (HUN), David Gomez (ESP)
5 December 2024; 19:00	Report	Žuvela 5	**Goals**	Gianazza, Irving 3	Bazen u Gružu, Dubrovnik; Referees: Tamas Kovacs-Csatlos (HUN), David Gomez (ESP)

5 December 2024; 21:00	Report	**GS Apollon Smyrnis** (Greece)	**17**–11	(France) Team Strasbourg	Athens, Greece; Referees: Ivan Rakovic (SRB), Norbert Ercse (HUN)
5 December 2024; 21:00	Report	Score by quarters: **4**–1, 2–**3**, 3–**6**, **8**–1			Athens, Greece; Referees: Ivan Rakovic (SRB), Norbert Ercse (HUN)
5 December 2024; 21:00	Report	Radovic 4	**Goals**	Petkovic 5	Athens, Greece; Referees: Ivan Rakovic (SRB), Norbert Ercse (HUN)

=== Group B ===
Pos	Team	Pld	W	PSW	PSL	L	GF	GA	GD	Pts	Qualification	(Hungary) BVSC	(Italy) ORT	(Greece) VOU	(Greece) PAN
1	(Hungary) BVSC-Manna ABC	6	5	0	0	1	84	67	+17	**15**	Eighth-finals	—	17–11	12–10	15–9
2	(Italy) CC Ortigia	6	4	0	0	2	70	74	−4	**12**	Eighth-finals	10–9	—	16–15	14–11
3	(Greece) NC Vouliagmeni	6	2	0	0	4	70	69	+1	**6**		14–15	11–6	—	9–10
4	(Greece) Panionios GSS	6	1	0	0	5	64	78	−14	**3**		13–16	11–13	10–11	—

Source: European Aquatics

10 October 2024; 19:30	Report	**CC Ortigia** (Italy)	**16**–15	(Greece) NC Vouliagmeni	Paolo Caldarella Swimming Pool, Siracusa; Referees: Jaume Teixido (ESP), Ante Bura (CRO)
10 October 2024; 19:30	Report	Score by quarters: 5–5, **3**–2, **5**–3, 3–**5**			Paolo Caldarella Swimming Pool, Siracusa; Referees: Jaume Teixido (ESP), Ante Bura (CRO)
10 October 2024; 19:30	Report	six players 2	**Goals**	Kalogeropoulos 4	Paolo Caldarella Swimming Pool, Siracusa; Referees: Jaume Teixido (ESP), Ante Bura (CRO)

10 October 2024; 20:30	Report	Panionios GSS (Greece)	13–**16**	(Hungary) **BVSC-Manna ABC**	Nea Smyrni Swimming Pool, Athens; Referees: David Gomez (ESP), Andreja Stanojevic (SRB)
10 October 2024; 20:30	Report	Score by quarters: 2–**5**, 3–**4**, 4–4, **4**–3			Nea Smyrni Swimming Pool, Athens; Referees: David Gomez (ESP), Andreja Stanojevic (SRB)
10 October 2024; 20:30	Report	Gounas 4	**Goals**	Konarik 5	Nea Smyrni Swimming Pool, Athens; Referees: David Gomez (ESP), Andreja Stanojevic (SRB)

17 October 2024; 17:00	Report	NC Vouliagmeni (Greece)	9–**10**	(Greece) **Panionios GSS**	"Cyprus" Swimming Pool, Vari; Referees: Xavier F. Buch (ESP), Jakov Blaskovic (CRO)
17 October 2024; 17:00	Report	Score by quarters: **4**–2, **2**–1, 1–**3**, 2–**4**			"Cyprus" Swimming Pool, Vari; Referees: Xavier F. Buch (ESP), Jakov Blaskovic (CRO)
17 October 2024; 17:00	Report	Kalogeropoulos 3	**Goals**	Gkiouvetsis 4	"Cyprus" Swimming Pool, Vari; Referees: Xavier F. Buch (ESP), Jakov Blaskovic (CRO)

17 October 2024; 18:30	Report	**BVSC-Manna ABC** (Hungary)	**17**–11	(Italy) CC Ortigia	Budapest, Hungary; Referees: Rik Evers (NED), Gernot Haentschel (GER)
17 October 2024; 18:30	Report	Score by quarters: 4–4, **6**–1, **4**–3, 3–3			Budapest, Hungary; Referees: Rik Evers (NED), Gernot Haentschel (GER)
17 October 2024; 18:30	Report	Csapo, Konarik 4	**Goals**	Cassia, Inaba 4	Budapest, Hungary; Referees: Rik Evers (NED), Gernot Haentschel (GER)

31 October 2024; 18:30	Report	**BVSC-Manna ABC** (Hungary)	**12**–10	(Greece) NC Vouliagmeni	Budapest, Hungary; Referees: Julien Bourges (FRA), Stanko Ivanovski (MNE)
31 October 2024; 18:30	Report	Score by quarters: **3**–2, 2–**4**, **3**–2, **4**–2			Budapest, Hungary; Referees: Julien Bourges (FRA), Stanko Ivanovski (MNE)
31 October 2024; 18:30	Report	Ekler 4	**Goals**	Kalogeropoulos, Ubović 3	Budapest, Hungary; Referees: Julien Bourges (FRA), Stanko Ivanovski (MNE)

31 October 2024; 20:30	Report	Panionios GSS (Greece)	11–**13**	(Italy) **CC Ortigia**	Nea Smyrni Swimming Pool, Athens; Referees: Ivan Rakovic (SRB), Vlaho Radicevic (CRO)
31 October 2024; 20:30	Report	Score by quarters: 3–**4**, 3–**4**, **3**–1, 2–**4**			Nea Smyrni Swimming Pool, Athens; Referees: Ivan Rakovic (SRB), Vlaho Radicevic (CRO)
31 October 2024; 20:30	Report	Gounas 3	**Goals**	Inaba 7	Nea Smyrni Swimming Pool, Athens; Referees: Ivan Rakovic (SRB), Vlaho Radicevic (CRO)

14 November 2024; 16:00	Report	**NC Vouliagmeni** (Greece)	**11**–6	(Italy) CC Ortigia	"Cyprus" Swimming Pool, Vari; Referees: Vojin Putnikovic (SRB), Rik Evers (NED)
14 November 2024; 16:00	Report	Score by quarters: **3**–2, 2–**3**, **4**–1, **2**–0			"Cyprus" Swimming Pool, Vari; Referees: Vojin Putnikovic (SRB), Rik Evers (NED)
14 November 2024; 16:00	Report	Kalogeropoulos 3	**Goals**	six players 1	"Cyprus" Swimming Pool, Vari; Referees: Vojin Putnikovic (SRB), Rik Evers (NED)

14 November 2024; 18:30	Report	**BVSC-Manna ABC** (Hungary)	**15**–9	(Greece) Panionios GSS	Budapest, Hungary; Referees: Veselin Miskovic (MNE), Tomislav Copic (CRO)
14 November 2024; 18:30	Report	Score by quarters: 3–3, **5**–1, **4**–3, **3**–2			Budapest, Hungary; Referees: Veselin Miskovic (MNE), Tomislav Copic (CRO)
14 November 2024; 18:30	Report	Dávid 4	**Goals**	Gkiouvetsis 5	Budapest, Hungary; Referees: Veselin Miskovic (MNE), Tomislav Copic (CRO)

21 November 2024; 15:00	Report	**CC Ortigia** (Italy)	**10**–9	(Hungary) BVSC-Manna ABC	Paolo Caldarella Swimming Pool, Siracusa; Referees: David Gomez (ESP), Vuk Milovic (SRB)
21 November 2024; 15:00	Report	Score by quarters: **4**–2, 2–2, 3–**4**, 1–1			Paolo Caldarella Swimming Pool, Siracusa; Referees: David Gomez (ESP), Vuk Milovic (SRB)
21 November 2024; 15:00	Report	Cassia, Inaba 3	**Goals**	Meszaros, Szeghalmi 3	Paolo Caldarella Swimming Pool, Siracusa; Referees: David Gomez (ESP), Vuk Milovic (SRB)

21 November 2024; 20:30	Report	Panionios GSS (Greece)	10–**11**	(Greece) **NC Vouliagmeni**	Nea Smyrni Swimming Pool, Athens; Referees: Matan Schwartz (ISR), Andreja Stanojevic (SRB)
21 November 2024; 20:30	Report	Score by quarters: 2–**3**, 1–**4**, 2–**3**, **5**–1			Nea Smyrni Swimming Pool, Athens; Referees: Matan Schwartz (ISR), Andreja Stanojevic (SRB)
21 November 2024; 20:30	Report	Mourikis 4	**Goals**	four players 2	Nea Smyrni Swimming Pool, Athens; Referees: Matan Schwartz (ISR), Andreja Stanojevic (SRB)

5 December 2024; 15:00	Report	**CC Ortigia** (Italy)	**14**–11	(Greece) Panionios GSS	Paolo Caldarella Swimming Pool, Siracusa; Referees: Andrej Franulovic (CRO), Sinisa Matijasevic (MNE)
5 December 2024; 15:00	Report	Score by quarters: 2–2, 3–**4**, **6**–1, 3–**4**			Paolo Caldarella Swimming Pool, Siracusa; Referees: Andrej Franulovic (CRO), Sinisa Matijasevic (MNE)
5 December 2024; 15:00	Report	Cassia 4	**Goals**	Gkiouvetsis 4	Paolo Caldarella Swimming Pool, Siracusa; Referees: Andrej Franulovic (CRO), Sinisa Matijasevic (MNE)

5 December 2024; 16:00	Report	NC Vouliagmeni (Greece)	14–**15**	(Hungary) **BVSC-Manna ABC**	"Cyprus" Swimming Pool, Vari; Referees: Hendrik Schopp (GER), Ante Bura (CRO)
5 December 2024; 16:00	Report	Score by quarters: **4**–3, 1–**5**, 5–5, **4**–2			"Cyprus" Swimming Pool, Vari; Referees: Hendrik Schopp (GER), Ante Bura (CRO)
5 December 2024; 16:00	Report	Chalyvopoulos 5	**Goals**	three players 3	"Cyprus" Swimming Pool, Vari; Referees: Hendrik Schopp (GER), Ante Bura (CRO)

=== Group C ===
Pos	Team	Pld	W	PSW	PSL	L	GF	GA	GD	Pts	Qualification	(Italy) REC	(Croatia) MLA	(Hungary) SZO	(Germany) DUI
1	(Italy) Recco Waterpolo	6	6	0	0	0	92	53	+39	**18**	Eighth-finals	—	7–4	17–11	19–8
2	(Croatia) HAVK Mladost Zagreb	6	3	0	1	2	79	63	+16	**10**	Eighth-finals	13–16	—	16–14	16–7
3	(Hungary) Szolnoki Dozsa-Praktiker	6	2	1	0	3	81	82	−1	**8**		10–15	18–17 (Note: Match finished 10–10. Szolnoki Dozsa-Praktiker won 8–7 on penalties.)	—	16–12
4	(Germany) ASC Duisburg	6	0	0	0	6	49	103	−54	**0**		7–18	6–17	9–17	—

Source: European Aquatics

10 October 2024; 18:00	Report	**Szolnoki Dozsa-Praktiker** (Hungary)	**18**–17 (PSO)	(Croatia) HAVK Mladost Zagreb	Szolnok Water Polo Arena, Szolnok; Referees: Christos Kourtidis (GRE), Juan Carlos Colominas (ESP)
10 October 2024; 18:00	Report	Score by quarters: 3–3, **4**–2, 4–4, 2–**4** PSO: **8**–7			Szolnok Water Polo Arena, Szolnok; Referees: Christos Kourtidis (GRE), Juan Carlos Colominas (ESP)
10 October 2024; 18:00	Report	Cseh, Schmölcz 3	**Goals**	Bukić 3	Szolnok Water Polo Arena, Szolnok; Referees: Christos Kourtidis (GRE), Juan Carlos Colominas (ESP)

10 October 2024; 20:00	Report	**Recco Waterpolo** (Italy)	**19**–8	(Germany) ASC Duisburg	Municipal Swimming Pool, Sori
10 October 2024; 20:00	Report	Score by quarters: **6**–1, 2–2, **5**–3, **6**–2			Municipal Swimming Pool, Sori
10 October 2024; 20:00	Report	Echenique, Hallock 4	**Goals**	Gusakov 3	Municipal Swimming Pool, Sori

17 October 2024; 19:15	Report	ASC Duisburg (Germany)	9–**17**	(Hungary) **Szolnoki Dozsa-Praktiker**	Schwimmstadion, Duisburg; Referees: Nikolaos Boudramis (GRE), Bozo Duraskovic (MNE)
17 October 2024; 19:15	Report	Score by quarters: 1–**3**, 2–**8**, 4–4, 2–2			Schwimmstadion, Duisburg; Referees: Nikolaos Boudramis (GRE), Bozo Duraskovic (MNE)
17 October 2024; 19:15	Report	Gusakov 2	**Goals**	Zerinváry 4	Schwimmstadion, Duisburg; Referees: Nikolaos Boudramis (GRE), Bozo Duraskovic (MNE)

17 October 2024; 20:45	Report	HAVK Mladost Zagreb (Croatia)	13–**16**	(Italy) **Recco Waterpolo**	Bazen Mladost, Zagreb; Referees: Michiel Zwart (NED), Spyridon Achladiotis (GRE)
17 October 2024; 20:45	Report	Score by quarters: 5–5, 3–**5**, 2–**3**, 3–3			Bazen Mladost, Zagreb; Referees: Michiel Zwart (NED), Spyridon Achladiotis (GRE)
17 October 2024; 20:45	Report	Busic 5	**Goals**	Di Fulvio, Hallock 3	Bazen Mladost, Zagreb; Referees: Michiel Zwart (NED), Spyridon Achladiotis (GRE)

31 October 2024; 19:15	Report	ASC Duisburg (Germany)	6–**17**	(Croatia) **HAVK Mladost Zagreb**	Schwimmstadion, Duisburg; Referees: Alex Marquez (ESP), Peter de Jong (NED)
31 October 2024; 19:15	Report	Score by quarters: 3–**6**, 1–**2**, 2–**5**, 0–**4**			Schwimmstadion, Duisburg; Referees: Alex Marquez (ESP), Peter de Jong (NED)
31 October 2024; 19:15	Report	three players 2	**Goals**	Busic 5	Schwimmstadion, Duisburg; Referees: Alex Marquez (ESP), Peter de Jong (NED)

31 October 2024; 20:45	Report	**Recco Waterpolo** (Italy)	**17**–11	(Hungary) Szolnoki Dozsa-Praktiker	Municipal Swimming Pool, Sori
31 October 2024; 20:45	Report	Score by quarters: **5**–3, **4**–3, **5**–3, **3**–2			Municipal Swimming Pool, Sori
31 October 2024; 20:45	Report	Cannella 5	**Goals**	Bedo 4	Municipal Swimming Pool, Sori

14 November 2024; 19:15	Report	ASC Duisburg (Germany)	7–**18**	(Italy) **Recco Waterpolo**	Schwimmstadion, Duisburg; Referees: Spyridon Achladiotis (GRE), Rastko Prlic (SRB)
14 November 2024; 19:15	Report	Score by quarters: 2–**6**, 1–**4**, 2–**5**, 2–**3**			Schwimmstadion, Duisburg; Referees: Spyridon Achladiotis (GRE), Rastko Prlic (SRB)
14 November 2024; 19:15	Report	Gusakov, Metten 2	**Goals**	Di Fulvio 4	Schwimmstadion, Duisburg; Referees: Spyridon Achladiotis (GRE), Rastko Prlic (SRB)

14 November 2024; 20:45	Report	**HAVK Mladost Zagreb** (Croatia)	**16**–14	(Hungary) Szolnoki Dozsa-Praktiker	Bazen Mladost, Zagreb; Referees: Boris Margeta (SLO), Konstantinos Vasileiou (GRE)
14 November 2024; 20:45	Report	Score by quarters: **4**–3, 4–4, **6**–5, 2–2			Bazen Mladost, Zagreb; Referees: Boris Margeta (SLO), Konstantinos Vasileiou (GRE)
14 November 2024; 20:45	Report	Bukic 6	**Goals**	Schmölcz 5	Bazen Mladost, Zagreb; Referees: Boris Margeta (SLO), Konstantinos Vasileiou (GRE)

21 November 2024; 18:00	Report	**Szolnoki Dozsa-Praktiker** (Hungary)	**16**–12	(Germany) ASC Duisburg	Szolnok Water Polo Arena, Szolnok; Referees: Georgios K. Polychronopoulos (GRE), Gregory Courbin (FRA)
21 November 2024; 18:00	Report	Score by quarters: **5**–3, **6**–1, 2–**3**, 3–**5**			Szolnok Water Polo Arena, Szolnok; Referees: Georgios K. Polychronopoulos (GRE), Gregory Courbin (FRA)
21 November 2024; 18:00	Report	Bedo, Vamosi 3	**Goals**	Metten, Simic 3	Szolnok Water Polo Arena, Szolnok; Referees: Georgios K. Polychronopoulos (GRE), Gregory Courbin (FRA)

21 November 2024; 20:30	Report	**Recco Waterpolo** (Italy)	**7**–4	(Croatia) HAVK Mladost Zagreb	Municipal Swimming Pool, Sori
21 November 2024; 20:30	Report	Score by quarters: **3**–2, **1**–0, **2**–1, 1–1			Municipal Swimming Pool, Sori
21 November 2024; 20:30	Report	Cannella, Gratta 2	**Goals**	Kharkov 2	Municipal Swimming Pool, Sori

5 December 2024; 18:00	Report	Szolnoki Dozsa-Praktiker (Hungary)	10–**15**	(Italy) **Recco Waterpolo**	Szolnok Water Polo Arena, Szolnok; Referees: Xavier F. Buch (ESP), Tomi Kavcic (SLO
5 December 2024; 18:00	Report	Score by quarters: 3–**4**, **5**–4, 1–**4**, 1–**3**			Szolnok Water Polo Arena, Szolnok; Referees: Xavier F. Buch (ESP), Tomi Kavcic (SLO
5 December 2024; 18:00	Report	Bedo, Schmölcz 3	**Goals**	Condemi 5	Szolnok Water Polo Arena, Szolnok; Referees: Xavier F. Buch (ESP), Tomi Kavcic (SLO

5 December 2024; 20:45	Report	**HAVK Mladost Zagreb** (Croatia)	**16**–7	(Germany) ASC Duisburg	Bazen Mladost, Zagreb; Referees: Vojin Putnikovic (SRB), Ruben Garcia (SUI)
5 December 2024; 20:45	Report	Score by quarters: **6**–2, **4**–2, **4**–0, 2–**3**			Bazen Mladost, Zagreb; Referees: Vojin Putnikovic (SRB), Ruben Garcia (SUI)
5 December 2024; 20:45	Report	Bukić 3	**Goals**	Gusakov 4	Bazen Mladost, Zagreb; Referees: Vojin Putnikovic (SRB), Ruben Garcia (SUI)

=== Group D ===
Pos	Team	Pld	W	PSW	PSL	L	GF	GA	GD	Pts	Qualification	(Spain) BAR	(Serbia) SAB	(Greece) PAN	(Hungary) HON
1	(Spain) CN Barcelona	6	4	0	0	2	69	61	+8	**12 (Note: CN Barcelona 24–21 VK Šabac)**	Eighth-finals	—	14–9	13–10	10–9
2	(Serbia) VK Šabac	6	4	0	0	2	60	62	−2	**12**	Eighth-finals	12–10	—	10–8	12–8
3	(Greece) Panathinaikos	6	3	0	0	3	64	60	+4	**9**		8–10	12–5	—	14–11
4	(Hungary) Endo Plus Service Honvéd	6	1	0	0	5	62	72	−10	**3**		13–12	10–12	11–12	—

Source: European Aquatics
Notes:

10 October 2024; 18:00	Report	Panathinaikos (Greece)	8–**10**	(Spain) **CN Barcelona**	Goudi Swimming Pool, Athens; Referees: Massimo Calabro (ITA), Sinisa Matijasevic (MNE)
10 October 2024; 18:00	Report	Score by quarters: 2–**3**, 1–1, 3–**4**, 2–2			Goudi Swimming Pool, Athens; Referees: Massimo Calabro (ITA), Sinisa Matijasevic (MNE)
10 October 2024; 18:00	Report	Papasifakis 3	**Goals**	te Riele 4	Goudi Swimming Pool, Athens; Referees: Massimo Calabro (ITA), Sinisa Matijasevic (MNE)

10 October 2024; 20:00	Report	**VK Šabac** (Serbia)	**12**–8	(Hungary) Endo Plus Service Honvéd	Šabac City Swimming Pool, Šabac; Referees: Riccardo Carmignani (ITA), Julien Bourges (FRA)
10 October 2024; 20:00	Report	Score by quarters: **4**–3, 1–**2**, **5**–2, **2**–1			Šabac City Swimming Pool, Šabac; Referees: Riccardo Carmignani (ITA), Julien Bourges (FRA)
10 October 2024; 20:00	Report	Stojanović 4	**Goals**	Hessels 2	Šabac City Swimming Pool, Šabac; Referees: Riccardo Carmignani (ITA), Julien Bourges (FRA)

17 October 2024; 19:30	Report	Endo Plus Service Honvéd (Hungary)	11–**12**	(Greece) **Panathinaikos**	Kőér Sports Swimming Pool, Budapest; Referees: Alessandro Severo (ITA), Tomislav Copic (CRO)
17 October 2024; 19:30	Report	Score by quarters: 3–3, 3–3, 3–**4**, 2–2			Kőér Sports Swimming Pool, Budapest; Referees: Alessandro Severo (ITA), Tomislav Copic (CRO)
17 October 2024; 19:30	Report	Ekler, Vadovics 3	**Goals**	Papanikolaou, Papasifakis 4	Kőér Sports Swimming Pool, Budapest; Referees: Alessandro Severo (ITA), Tomislav Copic (CRO)

17 October 2024; 20:45	Report	**CN Barcelona** (Spain)	**14**–9	(Serbia) VK Šabac	Nova Escullera Sport Center, Barcelona
17 October 2024; 20:45	Report	Score by quarters: 1–**2**, **3**–2, 3–**4**, **7**–1			Nova Escullera Sport Center, Barcelona
17 October 2024; 20:45	Report	Gorria Puga 4	**Goals**	Pljevančić 3	Nova Escullera Sport Center, Barcelona

31 October 2024; 20:45	Report	**CN Barcelona** (Spain)	**10**–9	(Hungary) Endo Plus Service Honvéd	Nova Escullera Sport Center, Barcelona; Referees: Hendrik Schopp (GER), Ante Bura (CRO)
31 October 2024; 20:45	Report	Score by quarters: **3**–2, 2–**6**, 1–1, **4**–0			Nova Escullera Sport Center, Barcelona; Referees: Hendrik Schopp (GER), Ante Bura (CRO)
31 October 2024; 20:45	Report	four players 2	**Goals**	Ekler, Hessels 2	Nova Escullera Sport Center, Barcelona; Referees: Hendrik Schopp (GER), Ante Bura (CRO)

31 October 2024; 21:00	Report	**Panathinaikos** (Greece)	**12**–5	(Serbia) VK Šabac	Goudi Swimming Pool, Athens; Referees: Matan Schwartz (ISR), Arnaldo Petronilli (ITA)
31 October 2024; 21:00	Report	Score by quarters: **3**–1, **4**–1, **3**–2, **2**–1			Goudi Swimming Pool, Athens; Referees: Matan Schwartz (ISR), Arnaldo Petronilli (ITA)
31 October 2024; 21:00	Report	Georgaras 3	**Goals**	Toholj 2	Goudi Swimming Pool, Athens; Referees: Matan Schwartz (ISR), Arnaldo Petronilli (ITA)

14 November 2024; 19:30	Report	Endo Plus Service Honvéd (Hungary)	10–**12**	(Serbia) **VK Šabac**	Kőér Sports Swimming Pool, Budapest; Referees: Nenad Peris (CRO), Levan Berishvili (GEO)
14 November 2024; 19:30	Report	Score by quarters: **4**–2, 0–**3**, 3–3, 3–**4**			Kőér Sports Swimming Pool, Budapest; Referees: Nenad Peris (CRO), Levan Berishvili (GEO)
14 November 2024; 19:30	Report	Ekler 4	**Goals**	Stojanović 5	Kőér Sports Swimming Pool, Budapest; Referees: Nenad Peris (CRO), Levan Berishvili (GEO)

14 November 2024; 20:45	Report	**CN Barcelona** (Spain)	**13**–10	(Greece) Panathinaikos	Nova Escullera Sport Center, Barcelona; Referees: Raffaele Colombo (ITA), Tomi Kavcic (SLO)
14 November 2024; 20:45	Report	Score by quarters: **2**–1, 3–3, 3–3, **5**–3			Nova Escullera Sport Center, Barcelona; Referees: Raffaele Colombo (ITA), Tomi Kavcic (SLO)
14 November 2024; 20:45	Report	Daura Gomez 4	**Goals**	Papasifakis, Rasovic 3	Nova Escullera Sport Center, Barcelona; Referees: Raffaele Colombo (ITA), Tomi Kavcic (SLO)

21 November 2024; 20:00	Report	**VK Šabac** (Serbia)	**12**–10	(Spain) CN Barcelona	Šabac City Swimming Pool, Šabac; Referees: Massimo Calabro (ITA), Philip Uhlig (GER)
21 November 2024; 20:00	Report	Score by quarters: 3–**5**, 1–1, **5**–3, **3**–1			Šabac City Swimming Pool, Šabac; Referees: Massimo Calabro (ITA), Philip Uhlig (GER)
21 November 2024; 20:00	Report	Stojanović 6	**Goals**	Goma Esforzado 4	Šabac City Swimming Pool, Šabac; Referees: Massimo Calabro (ITA), Philip Uhlig (GER)

21 November 2024; 21:00	Report	**Panathinaikos** (Greece)	**14**–11	(Hungary) Endo Plus Service Honvéd	Goudi Swimming Pool, Athens; Referees: Vlaho Radicevic (CRO), Mihnea Ioan Alexandrescu (ROU)
21 November 2024; 21:00	Report	Score by quarters: 2–**3**, 3–3, **5**–2, **4**–3			Goudi Swimming Pool, Athens; Referees: Vlaho Radicevic (CRO), Mihnea Ioan Alexandrescu (ROU)
21 November 2024; 21:00	Report	Sgouridis, Papanikolaou 4	**Goals**	Ekler 4	Goudi Swimming Pool, Athens; Referees: Vlaho Radicevic (CRO), Mihnea Ioan Alexandrescu (ROU)

5 December 2024; 19:30	Report	**Endo Plus Service Honvéd** (Hungary)	**13**–12	(Spain) CN Barcelona	Kőér Sports Swimming Pool, Budapest; Referees: Bozo Duraskovic (MNE), Daniele Bianco (ITA)
5 December 2024; 19:30	Report	Score by quarters: **4**–3, **3**–1, 2–2, 4–**6**			Kőér Sports Swimming Pool, Budapest; Referees: Bozo Duraskovic (MNE), Daniele Bianco (ITA)
5 December 2024; 19:30	Report	Ekler 6	**Goals**	Daura Gomez, van der Weijden 3	Kőér Sports Swimming Pool, Budapest; Referees: Bozo Duraskovic (MNE), Daniele Bianco (ITA)

5 December 2024; 20:00	Report	**VK Šabac** (Serbia)	**10**–8	(Greece) Panathinaikos	Šabac City Swimming Pool, Šabac; Referees: Alessandro Severo (ITA), Ruben Sap (NED)
5 December 2024; 20:00	Report	Score by quarters: **6**–1, 2–2, 0–**4**, **2**–1			Šabac City Swimming Pool, Šabac; Referees: Alessandro Severo (ITA), Ruben Sap (NED)
5 December 2024; 20:00	Report	Novakovic 3	**Goals**	Papasifakis 3	Šabac City Swimming Pool, Šabac; Referees: Alessandro Severo (ITA), Ruben Sap (NED)

== See also ==
- 2024–25 European Aquatics Champions League
- 2024–25 European Aquatics Euro Cup
- 2024–25 European Aquatics Challenger Cup
- 2024 European Aquatics Super Cup
- 2024–25 European Aquatics Women's Champions League
- 2024–25 European Aquatics Women's Euro Cup
- 2024–25 European Aquatics Women's Challenger Cup
- 2024 European Aquatics Women's Super Cup
