= 2024–25 European Aquatics Euro Cup =

Water polo sports season

European Aquatics Euro Cup
- 2024–25

Tournament information
- Sport: Water polo
- Dates: Qualification round: 26–29 September 2024; Group stage: 10 October – 5 December 2024; Knockout stage: 25 January–24 May 2025
- Teams: Competition proper: 16+8; Total: 36 (from 14 countries)
- Website: Official website

Final positions
- Champion: (Italy) Recco Waterpolo (1st title)
- Runner-up: (Serbia) Radnički Kragujevac

Tournament statistics
- Matches played: 142
- Goals scored: 3,418 (24.07 per match)

The 2024–25 European Aquatics Euro Cup is the 33rd edition of Europe's secondary club water polo competition organised by European Aquatics.

The defending champions were Jug AO Dubrovnik, but they were eliminated by Radnički Kragujevac in the eight-finals.

The winners were Recco Waterpolo, who defeated Radnički Kragujevac 28–21 over two legs. After winning the Euro Cup, Recco Waterpolo have won every major water polo title.

== Format ==
36 teams (14 from Champions League and 22 starting in this competition) will compete in this tournament. The 36 teams are divided into eight groups, four with five clubs and four with four teams. The groups are held in one country, where the top 2 in every group advances to the group stage. The group stage will be played in a home and away system. Like the previous round, the top 2 progresses into the knockout stage. The 8 teams left, plus the 8 teams that were eliminated at the Champions League main round, go into the knockout stage. There will be Eighth-finals, Quarter-finals, Semifinals and Final.

== Rankings ==
Rank	Association	Points	Teams
1	Italy	110,260	4
2	Hungary	84,492.5	4
3	Spain	71,732.5	4
4	Serbia	69,815	2
5	Greece	68,857.5	5
6	Croatia	57,210	4
7	France	45,620	2
8	Germany	33,042.5	4
9	Romania	17,087.5	1
10	Montenegro	14,977.5	2
11	(Georgia (country)) Georgia	12,407.5	0
12	Turkey	7,245	0
13	Russia	5,162.5	0
14	Switzerland	3,685	0
15	Netherlands	3,280	1

Rank	Association	Points	Teams
16	Slovakia	3,180	0
17	Portugal	2,972.5	0
18	Slovenia	2,960	1
19	Lithuania	1,877.5	0
20	Bosnia and Herzegovina	1,790	1
21	(United Kingdom) Great Britain	1,720	0
22	Belgium	1,310	0
23	Malta	1,310	0
24	Israel	860	0
25	Denmark	560	0
26	Finland	560	0
27	Bulgaria	370	0
28	Cyprus	370	0
29	Poland	317.5	0

== Teams ==
Eliminated in Champions League qualification round
(Bosnia and Herzegovina) VK Banja Luka	(Croatia) Jug AO Dubrovnik	(Croatia) HAVK Mladost Zagreb	(France) Pays d'Aix Natation
(Germany) Spandau 04	(Greece) NC Vouliagmeni	(Greece) AC PAOK	(Hungary) BVSC-Manna ABC (Note: BVSC-Zugló's name changed between their participation in this season's Champions League and Euro Cup.)
(Italy) AN Brescia	(Italy) CC Ortigia	(Romania) Dinamo București	(Serbia) VK Šabac
(Spain) CN Barcelona	(Turkey) Enka Istanbul		

Entering this tournament
(Croatia) Primorje EB Rijeka (3rd)	(Croatia) Solaris Šibenik (5th)	(France) Team Strasbourg (4th)	(Germany) ASC Duisburg (3rd)
(Germany) OSC Potsdam (4th)	(Germany) SV Ludwigsburg 08 (5th)	(Greece) Panathinaikos (4th)	(Greece) GS Apollon Smyrnis (5th)
(Greece) Panionios GSS (6th)	(Hungary) OSC Budapest (4th)	(Hungary) Endo Plus Service Honvéd (5th)	(Hungary) Szolnoki Dozsa-Praktiker (6th)
(Italy) Recco Waterpolo (1st)	(Italy) Iren Genova Quinto (5th)	(Italy) De Akker Team (6th)	(Montenegro) VA Cattaro Kotor (3rd)
(Montenegro) Budva Budvanska Rivijera (4th)	(Serbia) VK Valis Vega (6th)	(Slovenia) Triglav Kranj (1st)	(Spain) CN Terrassa (5th)
(Spain) CN Sant Andreu (6th)	(Spain) Tenerife Echeyde (9th)		

== Round and draw dates ==
=== Schedule ===
Phase	Round	Round date
Qualification round		26–29 September 2024
Main round	Matchday 1	10 October 2024
Main round	Matchday 2	17 October 2024
Main round	Matchday 3	31 October 2024
Main round	Matchday 4	14 November 2024
Main round	Matchday 5	21 November 2024
Main round	Matchday 6	5 December 2024
Eighth-finals	First leg	25 January 2025
Eighth-finals	Second leg	6 February 2025
Quarter-finals	First leg	27 February 2025
Quarter-finals	Second leg	20 March 2025
Semi-finals	First leg	3 April 2025
Semi-finals	Second leg	24 April 2025
Finals	First leg	10 May 2025
Finals	Second leg	24 May 2025

== Qualification round ==
=== Draw ===
The draw was on 16 September 2024. H indicates which club is hosting the groups. Teams in bold advanced to the group stage.

All 14 teams who were eliminated from the Champions League were placed in pots 1 and 2. The teams who finished second and third in the Champions League Qualification round were placed into pot 1, while the clubs who finished fourth and fifth are seeded into pot 2. As there are two vacant spots in pot 2, those places were occupied by the two highest ranked clubs from the European Aquatics club rankings who didn't take part in the Champions League Qualification round (Recco Waterpolo and Szolnoki Dozsa-Praktiker).

Regarding, pots 3, 4 and 5 consist of the clubs who didn't take part in the Champions League qualification round. The seeding of these clubs are based on the following:

- European Aquatics club rankings.
- European Aquatics country club rankings.
- European Aquatics men's national team rankings (although not applied).

Pot 1	Pot 2	Pot 3	Pot 4	Pot 5
(Croatia) **Jug AO Dubrovnik** (Hungary) **BVSC-Manna ABC** **(H)** (Germany) Spandau 04 (Serbia) **VK Šabac** **(H)** (Spain) **CN Barcelona** **(H)** (Croatia) **HAVK Mladost Zagreb** **(H)** (Italy) **AN Brescia** (Italy) **CC Ortigia**	(Romania) Dinamo București (Greece) **NC Vouliagmeni** (Greece) AC PAOK (France) Pays d'Aix Natation **(H)** (Bosnia and Herzegovina) VK Banja Luka (Turkey) Enka Istanbul (Italy) **Recco Waterpolo** (Hungary) **Szolnoki Dozsa-Praktiker** **(H)**	(Greece) **Panionios GSS** **(H)** (Croatia) Primorje EB Rijeka **(Hungary) Endo Plus Service Honvéd** (Greece) **GS Apollon Smyrnis** (France) **Team Strasbourg** (Croatia) Solaris Šibenik (Slovenia) Triglav Kranj **(H)** (Germany) SV Ludwigsburg 08	(Spain) CN Terrassa (Spain) Tenerife Echeyde (Germany) **ASC Duisburg** (Spain) CN Sant Andreu (Greece) **Panathinaikos** (Serbia) VK Valis Vega (Germany) OSC Potsdam (Italy) Iren Genova Quinto	(Hungary) OSC Budapest (Italy) De Akker Team (Montenegro) VA Cattaro Kotor (Montenegro) Budva Budvanska Rivijera **(H)**

=== Group A ===
26–29 September 2024, Šabac, Serbia

Pos	Team	Pld	W	PSW	PSL	L	GF	GA	GD	Pts	Qualification	(Serbia) SAB	(France) STR	(Romania) DIN	(Hungary) OSC	(Germany) POT
1	(Serbia) VK Šabac (H)	4	4	0	0	0	54	30	+24	**12**	Group stage	—	14–8	12–10	11–4	17–8
2	(France) Team Strasbourg	4	1	2	0	1	49	44	+5	**7 (Note: Team Strasbourg 15–13 Dinamo București)**	Group stage	—	—	15–13 (Note: Match ended 11–11, Team Strasbourg won 4–2 on penalties.)	11–10 (Note: Match ended 7–7, Team Strasbourg won 4–3 on penalties.)	15–7
3	(Romania) Dinamo București	4	2	0	1	1	58	56	+2	**7**		—	—	—	15–14	20–15
4	(Hungary) OSC Budapest	4	1	0	1	2	44	48	−4	**4**		—	—	—	—	—
5	(Germany) OSC Potsdam	4	0	0	0	4	41	68	−27	**0**		—	—	—	11–16	—

Source: European Aquatics
(H) Host

=== Group B ===
26–29 September 2024, Budva, Montenegro

Pos	Team	Pld	W	PSW	PSL	L	GF	GA	GD	Pts	Qualification	(Italy) BRE	(Hungary) HON	(Serbia) VAL	(Montenegro) BUD	(Bosnia and Herzegovina) BAN
1	(Italy) AN Brescia	4	4	0	0	0	80	26	+54	**12**	Group stage	—	12–7	—	—	32–3
2	(Hungary) Endo Plus Service Honvéd	4	3	0	0	1	68	25	+43	**9**	Group stage	—	—	—	—	32–0
3	(Serbia) VK Valis Vega	4	2	0	0	2	60	38	+22	**6**		9–17	6–10	—	—	—
4	(Montenegro) Budva Budvanska Rivijera (H)	4	1	0	0	3	57	62	−5	**3**		7–19	7–19	8–15	—	35–9
5	(Bosnia and Herzegovina) VK Banja Luka	4	0	0	0	4	15	129	−114	**0**		—	—	3–30	—	—

Source: European Aquatics
(H) Host

=== Group C ===
27–29 September 2024, Barcelona, Spain

Pos	Team	Pld	W	PSW	PSL	L	GF	GA	GD	Pts	Qualification	(Spain) BAR	(Greece) VOU	(Croatia) SOL	(Italy) QUI
1	(Spain) CN Barcelona (H)	3	3	0	0	0	43	35	+8	**9**	Group stage	—	13–11	17–12	13–12
2	(Greece) NC Vouliagmeni	3	2	0	0	1	38	31	+7	**6**	Group stage	—	—	12–10	15–8
3	(Croatia) Solaris Šibenik	3	1	0	0	2	34	38	−4	**3**		—	—	—	—
4	(Italy) Iren Genova Quinto	3	0	0	0	3	29	40	−11	**0**		—	—	9–12	—

Source: European Aquatics
(H) Host

=== Group D ===
26–29 September 2024, Zagreb, Croatia

Pos	Team	Pld	W	PSW	PSL	L	GF	GA	GD	Pts	Qualification	(Croatia) MLA	(Greece) APO	(Turkey) ENK	(Spain) SAN	(Montenegro) CAT
1	(Croatia) HAVK Mladost Zagreb (H)	4	4	0	0	0	68	26	+42	**12**	Group stage	—	13–6	16–7	21–9	18–4
2	(Greece) GS Apollon Smyrnis	4	3	0	0	1	57	31	+26	**9**	Group stage	—	—	—	15–5	—
3	(Turkey) Enka Istanbul	4	1	0	0	3	42	53	−11	**3 (Note: Head-to-head goal difference: Enka Istanbul +8, CN Sant Andreu –3, VA Cattaro Kotor –5.)**		—	7–17	—	16–7	—
4	(Spain) CN Sant Andreu	4	1	0	0	3	38	63	−25	**3**		—	—	—	—	17–11
5	(Montenegro) VA Cattaro Kotor	4	1	0	0	3	34	66	−32	**3**		—	6–19	13–12	—	—

Source: European Aquatics
(H) Host

=== Group E ===
27–29 September 2024, Athens, Greece

Pos	Team	Pld	W	PSW	PSL	L	GF	GA	GD	Pts	Qualification	(Hungary) SZO	(Greece) PAN	(Germany) SPA	(Spain) TEN
1	(Hungary) Szolnoki Dozsa-Praktiker	3	3	0	0	0	39	25	+14	**9**	Group stage	—	13–12	—	—
2	(Greece) Panionios GSS (H)	3	2	0	0	1	42	30	+12	**6**	Group stage	—	—	14–8	16–9
3	(Germany) Spandau 04	3	1	0	0	2	26	34	−8	**3**		7–11	—	—	—
4	(Spain) Tenerife Echeyde	3	0	0	0	3	24	42	−18	**0**		6–15	—	9–11	—

Source: European Aquatics
(H) Host

=== Group F ===
26–29 September 2024, Aix-en-Provence, France

Pos	Team	Pld	W	PSW	PSL	L	GF	GA	GD	Pts	Qualification	(Croatia) JUG	(Greece) PAN	(Italy) AKK	(France) PAY	(Germany) LUD
1	(Croatia) Jug AO Dubrovnik	4	4	0	0	0	67	45	+22	**12**	Group stage	—	17–15	—	—	17–9
2	(Greece) Panathinaikos	4	3	0	0	1	57	34	+23	**9**	Group stage	—	—	—	—	—
3	(Italy) De Akker Team	4	2	0	0	2	43	47	−4	**6**		10–16	4–11	—	—	16–10
4	(France) Pays d'Aix Natation (H)	4	1	0	0	3	49	57	−8	**3**		11–17	9–13	10–13	—	19–14
5	(Germany) SV Ludwigsburg 08	4	0	0	0	4	37	70	−33	**0**		—	4–18	—	—	—

Source: European Aquatics
(H) Host

=== Group G ===
27–29 September 2024, Kranj, Slovenia

Pos	Team	Pld	W	PSW	PSL	L	GF	GA	GD	Pts	Qualification	(Italy) ORT	(Germany) DUI	(Greece) PAOK	(Slovenia) TRI
1	(Italy) CC Ortigia	3	3	0	0	0	54	31	+23	**9**	Group stage	—	—	—	22–12
2	(Germany) ASC Duisburg	3	2	0	0	1	46	38	+8	**6**	Group stage	—	—	12–10	—
3	(Greece) AC PAOK	3	1	0	0	2	50	34	+16	**3**		13–15	—	—	—
4	(Slovenia) AVK Triglav Kranj (H)	3	0	0	0	3	19	66	−47	**0**		6–17	6–22	7–27	—

Source: European Aquatics
(H) Host

=== Group H ===
27–29 September 2024, Budapest, Hungary

Pos	Team	Pld	W	PSW	PSL	L	GF	GA	GD	Pts	Qualification	(Hungary) BVSC	(Italy) REC	(Croatia) RIJ	(Spain) TER
1	(Hungary) BVSC-Manna ABC (H)	3	3	0	0	0	46	34	+12	**9**	Group stage	—	16–11	14–10	16–13
2	(Italy) Recco Waterpolo	3	2	0	0	1	39	29	+10	**6**	Group stage	—	—	13–3	—
3	(Croatia) Primorje EB Rijeka	3	1	0	0	2	29	41	−12	**3**		—	—	—	16–14
4	(Spain) CN Terrassa	3	0	0	0	3	37	47	−10	**0**		—	10–15	—	—

Source: European Aquatics
(H) Host

== Group stage ==
Location of teams of the 2024–25 European Aquatics Euro Cup group stage.
Red: Group A; Blue: Group B; Yellow: Group C; Green: Group D.

The draw took place on the 30 September 2024 in Zagreb, Croatia.

The top 2 from every group advances to the Eighth-finals.

Teams are ranked according to points (3 points for a win, 2 points for a penalty shootout win, 1 point for a penalty shootout loss, 0 points for a loss), and if tied on points, the following tiebreaking criteria are applied, in the order given, to determine the rankings:

- Points in head-to-head matches among tied teams;
- Goal difference in head-to-head matches among tied teams;
- Goals scored in head-to-head matches among tied teams;
- Goal difference in all group matches;
- Goals scored in all group matches.

Seven countries are being represented, with Greece boasting the most clubs with four.

=== Group A ===
Pos	Team	Pld	W	PSW	PSL	L	GF	GA	GD	Pts	Qualification	(Italy) BRE	(Croatia) JUG	(Greece) APO	(France) STR
1	(Italy) AN Brescia	6	4	1	0	1	72	67	+5	14	Eighth-finals	—	12–10	16–15 (Note: Match ended 11–11. AN Brescia won 5–4 on penalties.)	11–9
2	(Croatia) Jug AO Dubrovnik	6	3	0	0	3	79	73	+6	9	Eighth-finals	15–11	—	14–10	15–11
3	(Greece) GS Apollon Smyrnis	6	2	0	1	3	70	71	−1	7		9–11	13–12	—	17–11
4	(France) Team Strasbourg	6	2	0	0	4	72	82	−10	6		13–16	16–13	12–10	—

Source: European Aquatics

=== Group B ===
Pos	Team	Pld	W	PSW	PSL	L	GF	GA	GD	Pts	Qualification	(Hungary) BVSC	(Italy) ORT	(Greece) VOU	(Greece) PAN
1	(Hungary) BVSC-Manna ABC	6	5	0	0	1	84	67	+17	15	Eighth-finals	—	17–11	12–10	15–9
2	(Italy) CC Ortigia	6	4	0	0	2	70	74	−4	12	Eighth-finals	10–9	—	16–15	14–11
3	(Greece) NC Vouliagmeni	6	2	0	0	4	70	69	+1	6		14–15	11–6	—	9–10
4	(Greece) Panionios GSS	6	1	0	0	5	64	78	−14	3		13–16	11–13	10–11	—

Source: European Aquatics

=== Group C ===
Pos	Team	Pld	W	PSW	PSL	L	GF	GA	GD	Pts	Qualification	(Italy) REC	(Croatia) MLA	(Hungary) SZO	(Germany) DUI
1	(Italy) Recco Waterpolo	6	6	0	0	0	92	53	+39	18	Eighth-finals	—	7–4	17–11	19–8
2	(Croatia) HAVK Mladost Zagreb	6	3	0	1	2	79	63	+16	10	Eighth-finals	13–16	—	16–14	16–7
3	(Hungary) Szolnoki Dozsa-Praktiker	6	2	1	0	3	81	82	−1	8		10–15	18–17 (Note: Match finished 10–10. Szolnoki Dozsa-Praktiker won 8–7 on penalties.)	—	16–12
4	(Germany) ASC Duisburg	6	0	0	0	6	49	103	−54	0		7–18	6–17	9–17	—

Source: European Aquatics

=== Group D ===
Pos	Team	Pld	W	PSW	PSL	L	GF	GA	GD	Pts	Qualification	(Spain) BAR	(Serbia) SAB	(Greece) PAN	(Hungary) HON
1	(Spain) CN Barcelona	6	4	0	0	2	69	61	+8	12 (Note: CN Barcelona 24–21 VK Šabac)	Eighth-finals	—	14–9	13–10	10–9
2	(Serbia) VK Šabac	6	4	0	0	2	60	62	−2	12	Eighth-finals	12–10	—	10–8	12–8
3	(Greece) Panathinaikos	6	3	0	0	3	64	60	+4	9		8–10	12–5	—	14–11
4	(Hungary) Endo Plus Service Honvéd	6	1	0	0	5	62	72	−10	3		13–12	10–12	11–12	—

Source: European Aquatics

== Knockout stage ==
In the eighth-finals draw, the teams were split into two draws, one containing the four teams who finished fourth in the Champions League group stage, who would be pitted up against a Euro Cup group winner. The other half of the draw would see the third place teams from the Champions League group stage be drawn against a runner up of the Euro Cup group stage. From the quarterfinals onwards, there will be no seeding for the draws.

Eighth-finals
(Croatia) HAVK Mladost Zagreb	18	13	31
(Romania) Steaua București	11	11	22
(Serbia) VK Šabac	8	4	12
(Montenegro) Jadran Herceg Novi	13	5	18
(Germany) Waspo'98 Hannover	12	11	23
(Italy) AN Brescia	15	11	26
(Croatia) Jug AO Dubrovnik	9	13	22
(Serbia) Radnički Kragujevac	15	14	29
(Spain) CN Barcelona	11	10	21
(Hungary) A-Híd Vasas Plaket	10	15	25
(Italy) Recco Waterpolo	17	17	34
(Georgia (country)) Dinamo Tbilisi	5	5	10
(Italy) CC Ortigia	10	7	17
(Spain) Astralpool Sabadell	13	13	26
(Hungary) BVSC-Manna ABC	16	16	32
(Montenegro) Primorac Kotor	16	17	33

Quarterfinals
(Croatia) HAVK Mladost Zagreb	12	6	18
(Montenegro) Jadran Herceg Novi	8	9	17
(Italy) AN Brescia	9	10	19
(Serbia) Radnički Kragujevac	9	14	23
(Hungary) A-Híd Vasas Plaket	9	7	16
(Italy) Recco Waterpolo	11	14	25
(Spain) Astralpool Sabadell	17	9	26
(Montenegro) Primorac Kotor	9	14	23

Semifinals
(Croatia) HAVK Mladost Zagreb	13	8	21
(Serbia) Radnički Kragujevac	10	15	25
(Italy) Recco Waterpolo	16	10	26
(Spain) Astralpool Sabadell	6	10	16

Final
(Serbia) Radnički Kragujevac	12	9	21
(Italy) Recco Waterpolo	16	12	28

=== Eight-finals ===
Team 1	Agg.	Team 2	1st leg	2nd leg
Jug AO Dubrovnik (Croatia)	22–29	(Serbia) Radnički Kragujevac	9–15	13–14
VK Šabac (Serbia)	12–18	(Montenegro) Jadran Herceg Novi	8–13	4–5
HAVK Mladost Zagreb (Croatia)	31–22	(Romania) Steaua București	18–11	13–11
CC Ortigia (Italy)	17–26	(Spain) Astralpool Sabadell	10–13	7–13
CN Barcelona (Spain)	21–25	(Hungary) A-Híd Vasas Plaket	11–10	10–15
Waspo'98 Hannover (Germany)	23–26	(Italy) AN Brescia	12–15	11–11
Recco Waterpolo (Italy)	34–10	(Georgia (country)) Dinamo Tbilisi	17–5	17–5
BVSC-Manna ABC (Hungary)	32–33	(Montenegro) Primorac Kotor	16–16	16–17

=== Quarterfinals ===
Team 1	Agg.	Team 2	1st leg	2nd leg
HAVK Mladost Zagreb (Croatia)	18–17	(Montenegro) Jadran Herceg Novi	12–8	6–9
AN Brescia (Italy)	19–23	(Serbia) Radnički Kragujevac	9–9	10–14
A-Híd Vasas Plaket (Hungary)	16–25	(Italy) Recco Waterpolo	9–11	7–14
Astralpool Sabadell (Spain)	26–23	(Montenegro) Primorac Kotor	17–9	9–14

=== Semifinals ===
Team 1	Agg.	Team 2	1st leg	2nd leg
HAVK Mladost Zagreb (Croatia)	21–25	(Serbia) Radnički Kragujevac	13–10	8–15
Recco Waterpolo (Italy)	26–16	(Spain) Astralpool Sabadell	16–6	10–10

=== Final ===
Team 1	Agg.	Team 2	1st leg	2nd leg
Radnički Kragujevac (Serbia)	21–28	(Italy) Recco Waterpolo	12–16	9–12

2024–25 European Aquatics Euro Cup Champions

Recco Waterpolo
First title

== See also ==
- 2024–25 European Aquatics Champions League
- 2024–25 European Aquatics Challenger Cup
- 2024 European Aquatics Super Cup
- 2024–25 European Aquatics Women's Champions League
- 2024–25 European Aquatics Women's Euro Cup
- 2024–25 European Aquatics Women's Challenger Cup
- 2024 European Aquatics Women's Super Cup
