= 2024–25 European Aquatics Euro Cup knockout stage =

Tournament information
- Sport: Water polo
- Dates: 25 January–24 May 2025
- Teams: 16
- Website: Official website

Tournament statistics
- Matches played: 30

The 2024–25 European Aquatics Euro Cup knockout stage details the matches played to decide the champion of the tournament. Games took place between the 25 January and 24 May 2025.

== Qualified teams ==
The knockout phase involves 16 teams: the eight teams which qualified as winners and runners-ups of each of the four groups in the group stage, and the eight third and fourth placed teams from the Champions League group stage.

=== Euro Cup group stage winners and runners-up ===
Group	Winners	Runners-up
A	(Italy) AN Brescia	(Croatia) Jug AO Dubrovnik
B	(Hungary) BVSC-Manna ABC	(Italy) CC Ortigia
C	(Italy) Recco Waterpolo	(Croatia) HAVK Mladost Zagreb
D	(Spain) CN Barcelona	(Serbia) VK Šabac

=== Eliminated teams from Champions League ===
Group	Third place	Fourth place
A	(Romania) Steaua București	(Germany) Waspo'98 Hannover
B	(Serbia) Radnički Kragujevac	(Georgia (country)) Dinamo Tbilisi
C	(Montenegro) Jadran Herceg Novi	(Hungary) A-Híd Vasas Plaket
D	(Spain) Astralpool Sabadell	(Montenegro) Primorac Kotor

== Draw ==
The draw took place in Zagreb on 11 December. The teams were split into two draws, one containing the four teams who finished fourth in the Champions League group stage, who would be pitted up against a Euro Cup group winner. The other half of the draw would see the third place teams from the Champions League group stage be drawn against a runner up of the Euro Cup group stage.

Fourth in Champions League Team (Germany) Waspo'98 Hannover (Georgia (country)) Dinamo Tbilisi (Hungary) A-Híd Vasas Plaket (Montenegro) Primorac Kotor	First in Euro Cup Team (Italy) AN Brescia (Hungary) BVSC-Manna ABC (Italy) Recco Waterpolo (Spain) CN Barcelona

Third in Champions League Team (Romania) Steaua București (Serbia) Radnički Kragujevac (Montenegro) Jadran Herceg Novi (Spain) Astralpool Sabadell	Second in Euro Cup Team (Croatia) Jug AO Dubrovnik (Italy) CC Ortigia (Croatia) HAVK Mladost Zagreb (Serbia) VK Šabac

== Bracket ==
Eighth-finals
(Croatia) HAVK Mladost Zagreb	18	13	31
(Romania) Steaua București	11	11	22
(Serbia) VK Šabac	8	4	12
(Montenegro) Jadran Herceg Novi	13	5	18
(Germany) Waspo'98 Hannover	12	11	23
(Italy) AN Brescia	15	11	26
(Croatia) Jug AO Dubrovnik	9	13	22
(Serbia) Radnički Kragujevac	15	14	29
(Spain) CN Barcelona	11	10	21
(Hungary) A-Híd Vasas Plaket	10	15	25
(Italy) Recco Waterpolo	17	17	34
(Georgia (country)) Dinamo Tbilisi	5	5	10
(Italy) CC Ortigia	10	7	17
(Spain) Astralpool Sabadell	13	13	26
(Hungary) BVSC-Manna ABC	16	16	32
(Montenegro) Primorac Kotor	16	17	33

Quarterfinals
(Croatia) HAVK Mladost Zagreb	12	6	18
(Montenegro) Jadran Herceg Novi	8	9	17
(Italy) AN Brescia	9	10	19
(Serbia) Radnički Kragujevac	9	14	23
(Hungary) A-Híd Vasas Plaket	9	7	16
(Italy) Recco Waterpolo	11	14	25
(Spain) Astralpool Sabadell	17	9	26
(Montenegro) Primorac Kotor	9	14	23

Semifinals
(Croatia) HAVK Mladost Zagreb	13	8	21
(Serbia) Radnički Kragujevac	10	15	25
(Italy) Recco Waterpolo	16	10	26
(Spain) Astralpool Sabadell	6	10	16

Final
(Serbia) Radnički Kragujevac	12	9	21
(Italy) Recco Waterpolo	16	12	28

== Eighth-finals ==
Team 1	Agg.	Team 2	1st leg	2nd leg
Jug AO Dubrovnik (Croatia)	22–29	(Serbia) Radnički Kragujevac	9–15	13–14
VK Šabac (Serbia)	12–18	(Montenegro) Jadran Herceg Novi	8–13	4–5
HAVK Mladost Zagreb (Croatia)	31–22	(Romania) Steaua București	18–11	13–11
CC Ortigia (Italy)	17–26	(Spain) Astralpool Sabadell	10–13	7–13
CN Barcelona (Spain)	21–25	(Hungary) A-Híd Vasas Plaket	11–10	10–15
Waspo'98 Hannover (Germany)	23–26	(Italy) AN Brescia	12–15	11–11
Recco Waterpolo (Italy)	34–10	(Georgia (country)) Dinamo Tbilisi	17–5	17–5
BVSC-Manna ABC (Hungary)	32–33	(Montenegro) Primorac Kotor	16–16	16–17

=== Matches ===
25 January 2025; 19:00	Report	Jug AO Dubrovnik (Croatia)	9–15	(Serbia) Radnički Kragujevac	Bazen u Gružu, Dubrovnik; Referees: Boris Margeta (SLO), Frank Ohme (GER)
25 January 2025; 19:00	Report	Score by quarters: 1–4, 3–4, 3–4, 2–3			Bazen u Gružu, Dubrovnik; Referees: Boris Margeta (SLO), Frank Ohme (GER)
25 January 2025; 19:00	Report	three players 2	Goals	Dadvani, Jaksic 3	Bazen u Gružu, Dubrovnik; Referees: Boris Margeta (SLO), Frank Ohme (GER)

6 February 2025; 20:00	Report	Radnički Kragujevac (Serbia)	14–13	(Croatia) Jug AO Dubrovnik	Sports Center Park, Kragujevac; Referees: Gyorgy Kun (HUN), Sebastien Dervieux (FRA)
6 February 2025; 20:00	Report	Score by quarters: 3–2, 6–1, 2–7, 3–3			Sports Center Park, Kragujevac; Referees: Gyorgy Kun (HUN), Sebastien Dervieux (FRA)
6 February 2025; 20:00	Report	four players 2	Goals	Pavlic 3	Sports Center Park, Kragujevac; Referees: Gyorgy Kun (HUN), Sebastien Dervieux (FRA)

Radnički Kragujevac won 29–22 on aggregate

25 January 2025; 19:00	Report	VK Šabac (Serbia)	8–13	(Montenegro) Jadran Herceg Novi	Šabac City Swimming Pool, Šabac; Referees: Gyorgy Kun (HUN), Pau Segurana (ESP)
25 January 2025; 19:00	Report	Score by quarters: 1–4, 2–4, 1–3, 4–2			Šabac City Swimming Pool, Šabac; Referees: Gyorgy Kun (HUN), Pau Segurana (ESP)
25 January 2025; 19:00	Report	Kovacevic 2	Goals	Kholod 4	Šabac City Swimming Pool, Šabac; Referees: Gyorgy Kun (HUN), Pau Segurana (ESP)

6 February 2025; 19:00	Report	Jadran Herceg Novi (Montenegro)	5–4	(Serbia) VK Šabac	Leotar Swimming Club, Trebinje (Note: Due to not having a venue that meets requirements, Jadran Herceg Novi played their home games in Trebinje, Bosnia and Herzegovina.); Referees: Raffaelle Colombo (ITA), George Mihai Balanescu (ROU)
6 February 2025; 19:00	Report	Score by quarters: 0–0, 2–2, 1–1, 2–1			Leotar Swimming Club, Trebinje; Referees: Raffaelle Colombo (ITA), George Mihai Balanescu (ROU)
6 February 2025; 19:00	Report	Kholod 2	Goals	Barac 2	Leotar Swimming Club, Trebinje; Referees: Raffaelle Colombo (ITA), George Mihai Balanescu (ROU)

Jadran Herceg Novi won 18–12 on aggregate

25 January 2025; 18:00	Report	HAVK Mladost Zagreb (Croatia)	18–11	(Romania) Steaua București	Bazen Mladost, Zagreb; Referees: Raffaele Colombo (ITA), Andreja Stanojevic (SRB)
25 January 2025; 18:00	Report	Score by quarters: 3–4, 7–3, 3–2, 5–2			Bazen Mladost, Zagreb; Referees: Raffaele Colombo (ITA), Andreja Stanojevic (SRB)
25 January 2025; 18:00	Report	Bukic 6	Goals	Georgescu 3	Bazen Mladost, Zagreb; Referees: Raffaele Colombo (ITA), Andreja Stanojevic (SRB)

6 February 2025; 18:30	Report	Steaua București (Romania)	11–13	(Croatia) HAVK Mladost Zagreb	Complexul Sportiv Steaua, Bucharest; Referees: Hendrik Schopp (GER), Rajmund Fodor (HUN)
6 February 2025; 18:30	Report	Score by quarters: 4–4, 4–4, 1–3, 2–2			Complexul Sportiv Steaua, Bucharest; Referees: Hendrik Schopp (GER), Rajmund Fodor (HUN)
6 February 2025; 18:30	Report	Georgescu, Iudean 3	Goals	Lazic, Kharkov 3	Complexul Sportiv Steaua, Bucharest; Referees: Hendrik Schopp (GER), Rajmund Fodor (HUN)

HAVK Mladost Zagreb won 31–22 on aggregate

25 January 2025; 16:00	Report	CC Ortigia (Italy)	10–13	(Spain) Astralpool Sabadell	Paolo Caldarella Swimming Pool, Siracusa; Referees: Michiel Zwart (NED), Sinisa Matijasevic (MNE)
25 January 2025; 16:00	Report	Score by quarters: 2–2, 1–4, 2–2, 5–5			Paolo Caldarella Swimming Pool, Siracusa; Referees: Michiel Zwart (NED), Sinisa Matijasevic (MNE)
25 January 2025; 16:00	Report	Inaba 4	Goals	Averka 5	Paolo Caldarella Swimming Pool, Siracusa; Referees: Michiel Zwart (NED), Sinisa Matijasevic (MNE)

6 February 2025; 19:30	Report	Astralpool Sabadell (Spain)	13–7	(Italy) CC Ortigia	Can Llong pool, Sabadell; Referees: Frank Ohme (GER), Jakov Blaskovic (CRO)
6 February 2025; 19:30	Report	Score by quarters: 3–1, 4–3, 3–2, 3–1			Can Llong pool, Sabadell; Referees: Frank Ohme (GER), Jakov Blaskovic (CRO)
6 February 2025; 19:30	Report	three players 2	Goals	Cassia, Campopiano 2	Can Llong pool, Sabadell; Referees: Frank Ohme (GER), Jakov Blaskovic (CRO)

Astralpool Sabadell won 26–17 on aggregate

25 January 2025; 18:30	Report	CN Barcelona (Spain)	11–10	(Hungary) A-Híd Vasas Plaket	Nova Escullera Sport Center, Barcelona; Referees: Georgios Stavridis (GRE), Daniele Bianco (ITA)
25 January 2025; 18:30	Report	Score by quarters: 2–1, 4–2, 1–3, 4–4			Nova Escullera Sport Center, Barcelona; Referees: Georgios Stavridis (GRE), Daniele Bianco (ITA)
25 January 2025; 18:30	Report	Daura Gomez 3	Goals	Durdic, Randelovic 3	Nova Escullera Sport Center, Barcelona; Referees: Georgios Stavridis (GRE), Daniele Bianco (ITA)

6 February 2025; 20:30	Report	A-Híd Vasas Plaket (Hungary)	15–10	(Spain) CN Barcelona	Császár-Komjádi Béla Sport Swimming Pool, Budapest; Referees: Boris Margeta (SLO), Rik Evers (NED)
6 February 2025; 20:30	Report	Score by quarters: 5–0, 4–4, 2–3, 4–3			Császár-Komjádi Béla Sport Swimming Pool, Budapest; Referees: Boris Margeta (SLO), Rik Evers (NED)
6 February 2025; 20:30	Report	three players 3	Goals	Daura Gomez 6	Császár-Komjádi Béla Sport Swimming Pool, Budapest; Referees: Boris Margeta (SLO), Rik Evers (NED)

A-Híd Vasas Plaket won 25–21 on aggregate

25 January 2025; 18:00	Report	Waspo'98 Hannover (Germany)	12–15	(Italy) AN Brescia	Magdeburg Dynamo Schwimmhalle, Magdeburg; Referees: Nikolaos Boudramis (GRE), Maxim Gerasimov (GBR)
25 January 2025; 18:00	Report	Score by quarters: 4–3, 3–3, 3–5, 2–4			Magdeburg Dynamo Schwimmhalle, Magdeburg; Referees: Nikolaos Boudramis (GRE), Maxim Gerasimov (GBR)
25 January 2025; 18:00	Report	Strelezkij 3	Goals	Balzarini, Ferrero 4	Magdeburg Dynamo Schwimmhalle, Magdeburg; Referees: Nikolaos Boudramis (GRE), Maxim Gerasimov (GBR)

6 February 2025; 20:00	Report	AN Brescia (Italy)	11–11	(Germany) Waspo'98 Hannover	Mompiano Swimming Center, Brescia; Referees: Julien Bourges (FRA), Stanko Ivanovski (MNE)
6 February 2025; 20:00	Report	Score by quarters: 3–3, 3–2, 4–3, 1–3			Mompiano Swimming Center, Brescia; Referees: Julien Bourges (FRA), Stanko Ivanovski (MNE)
6 February 2025; 20:00	Report	Alesiani, Irving 3	Goals	Schipper, Lozina 3	Mompiano Swimming Center, Brescia; Referees: Julien Bourges (FRA), Stanko Ivanovski (MNE)

AN Brescia won 26–23 on aggregate

25 January 2025; 20:30	Report	Recco Waterpolo (Italy)	17–5	(Georgia (country)) Dinamo Tbilisi	Municipal Swimming Pool, Sori
25 January 2025; 20:30	Report	Score by quarters: 7–2, 3–1, 3–1, 4–1			Municipal Swimming Pool, Sori
25 January 2025; 20:30	Report	Condemi, Hallock 4	Goals	Pjesicav, Tankosic 2	Municipal Swimming Pool, Sori

6 February 2025; 19:00	Report	Dinamo Tbilisi (Georgia (country))	5–17	(Italy) Recco Waterpolo	Olympic Swimming Pool, Tbilisi; Referees: Jaume Teixido (ESP), Konstantinos VasilEiou (GRE)
6 February 2025; 19:00	Report	Score by quarters: 1–3, 0–5, 2–5, 2–4			Olympic Swimming Pool, Tbilisi; Referees: Jaume Teixido (ESP), Konstantinos VasilEiou (GRE)
6 February 2025; 19:00	Report	Chikovani 2	Goals	four players 3	Olympic Swimming Pool, Tbilisi; Referees: Jaume Teixido (ESP), Konstantinos VasilEiou (GRE)

Recco Waterpolo won 34–10 on aggregate

25 January 2025; 19:00	Report	BVSC-Manna ABC (Hungary)	16–16	(Montenegro) Primorac Kotor	Budapest, Hungary; Referees: Xavier F. Buch (ESP), Sebastien Dervieux (FRA)
25 January 2025; 19:00	Report	Score by quarters: 5–4, 4–3, 3–3, 4–6			Budapest, Hungary; Referees: Xavier F. Buch (ESP), Sebastien Dervieux (FRA)
25 January 2025; 19:00	Report	Konarik 4	Goals	three players 4	Budapest, Hungary; Referees: Xavier F. Buch (ESP), Sebastien Dervieux (FRA)

6 February 2025; 17:30	Report	Primorac Kotor (Montenegro)	17–16	(Hungary) BVSC-Manna ABC	Nikša Bućin Swimming Pool, Kotor; Referees: Spyridon Achladiotis (GRE), Massimo Calabro (ITA)
6 February 2025; 17:30	Report	Score by quarters: 4–3, 5–6, 7–3, 1–4			Nikša Bućin Swimming Pool, Kotor; Referees: Spyridon Achladiotis (GRE), Massimo Calabro (ITA)
6 February 2025; 17:30	Report	Mrsic 5	Goals	Tatrai 5	Nikša Bućin Swimming Pool, Kotor; Referees: Spyridon Achladiotis (GRE), Massimo Calabro (ITA)

Primorac Kotor won 33–32 on aggregate

== Quarterfinals ==
The draw was held on 7 February 2025.

Team 1	Agg.	Team 2	1st leg	2nd leg
HAVK Mladost Zagreb (Croatia)	18–17	(Montenegro) Jadran Herceg Novi	12–8	6–9
AN Brescia (Italy)	19–23	(Serbia) Radnički Kragujevac	9–9	10–14
A-Híd Vasas Plaket (Hungary)	16–25	(Italy) Recco Waterpolo	9–11	7–14
Astralpool Sabadell (Spain)	26–23	(Montenegro) Primorac Kotor	17–9	9–14

=== Matches ===
27 February 2025; 19:30	Report	HAVK Mladost Zagreb (Croatia)	12–8	(Montenegro) Jadran Herceg Novi	Bazen Mladost, Zagreb; Referees: Georgios Stravidis (GRE), Tamas Kovacs-Csatlos (HUN)
27 February 2025; 19:30	Report	Score by quarters: 2–1, 3–0, 5–4, 2–3			Bazen Mladost, Zagreb; Referees: Georgios Stravidis (GRE), Tamas Kovacs-Csatlos (HUN)
27 February 2025; 19:30	Report	Milos 3	Goals	Radovic 4	Bazen Mladost, Zagreb; Referees: Georgios Stravidis (GRE), Tamas Kovacs-Csatlos (HUN)

20 March 2025; 19:00	Report	Jadran Herceg Novi (Montenegro)	9–6	(Croatia) HAVK Mladost Zagreb	Leotar Swimming Club, Trebinje (Note: Due to not having a venue that meets requirements, Jadran Herceg Novi played their home games in Trebinje, Bosnia and Herzegovina.); Referees: Boris Margeta (SLO), Matan Schwartz (ISR)
20 March 2025; 19:00	Report	Score by quarters: 0–3, 3–2, 3–0, 3–1			Leotar Swimming Club, Trebinje; Referees: Boris Margeta (SLO), Matan Schwartz (ISR)
20 March 2025; 19:00	Report	three players 2	Goals	Lazic 2	Leotar Swimming Club, Trebinje; Referees: Boris Margeta (SLO), Matan Schwartz (ISR)

HAVK Mladost Zagreb won 18–17 on aggregate

27 February 2025; 19:00	Report	AN Brescia (Italy)	9–9	(Serbia) Radnički Kragujevac	Mompiano Swimming Center, Brescia; Referees: David Gomez (ESP), Peter de Jong (NED)
27 February 2025; 19:00	Report	Score by quarters: 3–2, 3–3, 1–4, 2–0			Mompiano Swimming Center, Brescia; Referees: David Gomez (ESP), Peter de Jong (NED)
27 February 2025; 19:00	Report	Dolce 4	Goals	three players 2	Mompiano Swimming Center, Brescia; Referees: David Gomez (ESP), Peter de Jong (NED)

20 March 2025; 20:00	Report	Radnički Kragujevac (Serbia)	14–10	(Italy) AN Brescia	Sports Center Park, Kragujevac; Referees: Georgios Stravidis (GRE), Gyorgy Kun (HUN)
20 March 2025; 20:00	Report	Score by quarters: 3–1, 3–2, 4–3, 4–4			Sports Center Park, Kragujevac; Referees: Georgios Stravidis (GRE), Gyorgy Kun (HUN)
20 March 2025; 20:00	Report	Pijetlovic, Rasovic 3	Goals	four players 2	Sports Center Park, Kragujevac; Referees: Georgios Stravidis (GRE), Gyorgy Kun (HUN)

Radnički Kragujevac won 23–19 on aggregate

27 February 2025; 20:00	Report	A-Híd Vasas Plaket (Hungary)	9–11	(Italy) Recco Waterpolo	Császár-Komjádi Béla Sport Swimming Pool, Budapest; Referees: Spyridon Achladiotis (GRE), Vuk Milovic (SRB)
27 February 2025; 20:00	Report	Score by quarters: 2–3, 2–2, 2–2, 3–4			Császár-Komjádi Béla Sport Swimming Pool, Budapest; Referees: Spyridon Achladiotis (GRE), Vuk Milovic (SRB)
27 February 2025; 20:00	Report	Durdic 4	Goals	Cannella 4	Császár-Komjádi Béla Sport Swimming Pool, Budapest; Referees: Spyridon Achladiotis (GRE), Vuk Milovic (SRB)

20 March 2025; 21:00	Report	Recco Waterpolo (Italy)	14–7	(Hungary) A-Híd Vasas Plaket	Municipal Swimming Pool, Sori; Referees: Gernot Haentschel (GER), Andrej Franulovic (CRO)
20 March 2025; 21:00	Report	Score by quarters: 3–1, 3–2, 5–2, 3–2			Municipal Swimming Pool, Sori; Referees: Gernot Haentschel (GER), Andrej Franulovic (CRO)
20 March 2025; 21:00	Report	Cannella 4	Goals	three players 2	Municipal Swimming Pool, Sori; Referees: Gernot Haentschel (GER), Andrej Franulovic (CRO)

Recco Waterpolo won 25–16 on aggregate

27 February 2025; 19:30	Report	Astralpool Sabadell (Spain)	17–9	(Montenegro) Primorac Kotor	Can Llong pool, Sabadell; Referees: Matan Schwartz (ISR), Hendrik Schopp (GER)
27 February 2025; 19:30	Report	Score by quarters: 4–4, 4–2, 4–1, 5–2			Can Llong pool, Sabadell; Referees: Matan Schwartz (ISR), Hendrik Schopp (GER)
27 February 2025; 19:30	Report	Barroso Macarro 4	Goals	Brkic 3	Can Llong pool, Sabadell; Referees: Matan Schwartz (ISR), Hendrik Schopp (GER)

20 March 2025; 17:30	Report	Primorac Kotor (Montenegro)	14–9	(Spain) Astralpool Sabadell	Nikša Bućin Swimming Pool, Kotor; Referees: Sebastien Dervieux (FRA), Nikolaos Boudramis (GRE)
20 March 2025; 17:30	Report	Score by quarters: 2–2, 4–5, 3–2, 5–0			Nikša Bućin Swimming Pool, Kotor; Referees: Sebastien Dervieux (FRA), Nikolaos Boudramis (GRE)
20 March 2025; 17:30	Report	Shushiashvili 4	Goals	three players 2	Nikša Bućin Swimming Pool, Kotor; Referees: Sebastien Dervieux (FRA), Nikolaos Boudramis (GRE)

Astralpool Sabadell won 26–23 on aggregate

== Semifinals ==
Team 1	Agg.	Team 2	1st leg	2nd leg
HAVK Mladost Zagreb (Croatia)	21–25	(Serbia) Radnički Kragujevac	13–10	8–15
Recco Waterpolo (Italy)	26–16	(Spain) Astralpool Sabadell	16–6	10–10

=== Matches ===
3 April 2025; 19:30	Report	HAVK Mladost Zagreb (Croatia)	13–10	(Serbia) Radnički Kragujevac	Bazen Mladost, Zagreb; Referees: Frank Ohme (GER), Tamas Kovacs-Csatlos (HUN)
3 April 2025; 19:30	Report	Score by quarters: 4–1, 2–3, 3–3, 4–3			Bazen Mladost, Zagreb; Referees: Frank Ohme (GER), Tamas Kovacs-Csatlos (HUN)
3 April 2025; 19:30	Report	Kharkov 4	Goals	Jakšić 3	Bazen Mladost, Zagreb; Referees: Frank Ohme (GER), Tamas Kovacs-Csatlos (HUN)

24 April 2025; 19:00	Report	Radnički Kragujevac (Serbia)	15–8	(Croatia) HAVK Mladost Zagreb	Sports Center Park, Kragujevac; Referees: Boris Margeta (SLO), Georgios Stavridis (GRE)
24 April 2025; 19:00	Report	Score by quarters: 5–4, 2–1, 4–3, 4–0			Sports Center Park, Kragujevac; Referees: Boris Margeta (SLO), Georgios Stavridis (GRE)
24 April 2025; 19:00	Report	Dadvani 4	Goals	Kharkov 2	Sports Center Park, Kragujevac; Referees: Boris Margeta (SLO), Georgios Stavridis (GRE)

Radnički Kragujevac won 25–21 on aggregate

3 April 2025; 21:00	Report	Recco Waterpolo (Italy)	16–6	(Spain) Astralpool Sabadell	Municipal Swimming Pool, Sori
3 April 2025; 21:00	Report	Score by quarters: 6–0, 2–1, 4–2, 4–3			Municipal Swimming Pool, Sori
3 April 2025; 21:00	Report	Cannella 5	Goals	Barroso Macarro 3	Municipal Swimming Pool, Sori

24 April 2025; 19:30	Report	Astralpool Sabadell (Spain)	10–10	(Italy) Recco Waterpolo	Can Llong pool, Sabadell; Referees: Gyorgy Kun (HUN), Sebastien Dervieux (FRA)
24 April 2025; 19:30	Report	Score by quarters: 3–3, 0–3, 3–1, 4–3			Can Llong pool, Sabadell; Referees: Gyorgy Kun (HUN), Sebastien Dervieux (FRA)
24 April 2025; 19:30	Report	Averka 4	Goals	Hallock 3	Can Llong pool, Sabadell; Referees: Gyorgy Kun (HUN), Sebastien Dervieux (FRA)

Recco Waterpolo won 26–16 on aggregate

== Final ==
Team 1	Agg.	Team 2	1st leg	2nd leg
Radnički Kragujevac (Serbia)	21–28	(Italy) Recco Waterpolo	12–16	9–12

=== Matches ===
10 May 2025; 21:00	Report	Radnički Kragujevac (Serbia)	12–16	(Italy) Recco Waterpolo	Sports Center Park, Kragujevac; Referees: Xavier F. Buch (ESP), Matan Schwartz (ISR)
10 May 2025; 21:00	Report	Score by quarters: 4–2, 2–5, 2–3, 4–6			Sports Center Park, Kragujevac; Referees: Xavier F. Buch (ESP), Matan Schwartz (ISR)
10 May 2025; 21:00	Report	Dadvani, Rašović 3	Goals	Di Fulvio 5	Sports Center Park, Kragujevac; Referees: Xavier F. Buch (ESP), Matan Schwartz (ISR)

24 May 2025; 20:00	Report	Recco Waterpolo (Italy)	12–9	(Serbia) Radnički Kragujevac	Municipal Swimming Pool, Sori; Referees: Michiel Zwart (NED), Gyorgy Kun (HUN)
24 May 2025; 20:00	Report	Score by quarters: 3–2, 4–1, 2–3, 3–3			Municipal Swimming Pool, Sori; Referees: Michiel Zwart (NED), Gyorgy Kun (HUN)
24 May 2025; 20:00	Report	Cannella 4	Goals	Jakšić, Vapinski 3	Municipal Swimming Pool, Sori; Referees: Michiel Zwart (NED), Gyorgy Kun (HUN)

Recco Waterpolo won 28–21 on aggregate

== See also ==
- 2024–25 European Aquatics Champions League
- 2024–25 European Aquatics Challenger Cup
- 2024 European Aquatics Super Cup
- 2024–25 European Aquatics Women's Champions League
- 2024–25 European Aquatics Women's Euro Cup
- 2024–25 European Aquatics Women's Challenger Cup
- 2024 European Aquatics Women's Super Cup
