= 2016–17 Serie A1 (men's water polo) =

Water polo league season

Serie A1
- Season: 2016–17
- Champions: Pro Recco; 31st

The 2016–17 Serie A1 is the 98th season of the Serie A1, Italy's premier Water polo league.

== Team information ==
Location of teams in 2016–17 Serie A1

The following 14 clubs compete in the Serie A1 during the 2016–17 season:

Serie A1
Team	City	Pool	Founded	Colours
Acquachiara	Naples	Piscina Felipe Scandone	1998	
Brescia	Brescia	Centro Natatorio Mompiano	1973	
Bogliasco	Bogliasco	Stadio del nuoto Gianni Vassallo	1951	
Canottieri Napoli	Naples	Piscina Felipe Scandone	1916	
Lazio	Rome	Salaria Sport Village	1904	
Ortigia	Syracuse	Piscina Paolo Caldarella	1928	
Posillipo	Naples	Piscina Felipe Scandone	1925	
Pro Recco	Recco	Piscina comunale di Sori	1913	
Quinto	Genoa	Stadio del nuoto Gianni Vassallo	1921	
Roma Vis Nova	Rome	Stadio Olimpico del Nuoto	1979	
Savona	Savona	Piscina Carlo Zanelli	1948	
Sport Management	Verona	Centro Natatorio Sportivo Belvedere	1987	
Torino '81	Turin	Piscina Stadio Monumentale	1981	
Trieste	Trieste	Polo Natatorio Città di Trieste	2003	

== Regular season (Prima Fase) ==
=== Standings ===
	Team	Pld	W	D	L	GF	GA	Diff	Pts	Qualification
1	Pro Recco N e PN	2	2	0	0	25	8	+17	6	
2	AN Brescia	2	2	0	0	25	13	+12	6	
3	CC Napoli	2	2	0	0	20	9	+11	6	
4	BPM PN Sport Management	2	2	0	0	17	10	+7	6	
5	CN Posillipo	2	1	0	1	26	19	+7	3	
6	Roma Vis Nova	2	1	0	1	27	26	+1	3	
7	Pallanuoto Trieste	2	1	0	1	20	19	+1	3	
8	Carpisa YamamaY Acquachiara	2	1	0	1	14	17	−3	3	
9	C.C. Ortigia	2	1	0	1	18	22	−4	3	
10	Bogliasco Bene	2	0	1	1	23	26	−3	1	
11	RN Savona	2	0	1	1	16	21	−5	1	
12	Reale Mutua Torino '81 IREN	2	0	0	2	13	25	−12	0	
13	SS Lazio Nuoto	2	0	0	2	10	24	−14	0	
14	Genova Quinto B&B Ass.	2	0	0	2	15	30	−15	0	

== Season statistics ==
=== Number of teams by regions ===
	Regions	No. teams	Teams
1	Liguria	4	Bogliasco, Pro Recco, Quinto and Savona
2	Campania	3	Acquachiara, Canottieri and Posillipo
3	Lazio	2	Lazio and Roma Vis Nova
4	Friuli-Venezia Giulia	1	Trieste
4	Lombardy	1	AN Brescia
4	Piedmont	1	Torino '81
4	Sicily	1	Ortigia
4	Veneto	1	Sport Management
