= 2026–27 European Aquatics Champions League qualification round =

- 2026–27

Tournament information
- Sport: Water polo
- Date: 18–20 September 2026
- Host(s): (Romania) Oradea (Croatia) Split (Georgia (country)) Tbilisi
- Teams: 11 (from 11 countries)
- Website: Official website

Tournament statistics
- Matches played: 15
- Goals scored: 417 (27.8 per match)

The 2026–27 European Aquatics Champions League qualification round was played between 18 and 20 September 2026 to determine the six teams advancing to the group stage of the 2026–27 European Aquatics Champions League.

== Format ==
The 11 teams were placed into three groups, two with four teams and one with three teams. In each group, teams will play against each other once in a round-robin format. The group winners and runners up advanced to the group stage.

Teams are ranked according to points (3 points for a win, 2 points for a penalty shootout win, 1 point for a penalty shootout loss, 0 points for a loss), and if tied on points, the following tiebreaking criteria are applied, in the order given, to determine the rankings:

- Points in head-to-head matches among tied teams;
- Goal difference in head-to-head matches among tied teams;
- Goals scored in head-to-head matches among tied teams;
- Goal difference in all group matches;
- Goals scored in all group matches.

== Draw ==
External videos
- 2026–27 European Aquatics Champions League qualification round – Draw
- Draw

The draw was on 14 August 2026 in Zagreb, Croatia. (H) indicates which clubs is hosting a group. The seeding is based on the club rankings.

Key to colours
Teams advancing to group stage

Pot 1
Team	Rank	Points
(Croatia) Jadran Split (H)	8	21,932.5
(Romania) CSM Oradea (H)	12	15,650
(Georgia (country)) A-Polo Sport Management (H)	54	280

Pot 2
Team	Rank	Points
(Serbia) Novi Beograd Tehnomanija	4	33,687.5
(Italy) AN Brescia	7	22,330

Pot 3
Team	Rank	Points
(Spain) Astralpool CN Sabadell	10	17,260
(Hungary) Endo Plus Service Honvéd	27	7,270

Pot 4
Team	Rank	Points
(Greece) Panathinaikos	28	6,820
(Germany) Spandau 04	31	6,440

Pot 5
Team	Rank	Points
(France) Team Strasbourg	59	1,605
(Montenegro) PVK Budvanska Rivijera	78	935

== Groups ==
=== Group A ===
18–20 September 2026, Oradea, Romania

Pos	Team	Pld	W	PSW	PSL	L	GF	GA	GD	Pts	Qualification	NOV	ORA	SPA	STR
1	(Serbia) Novi Beograd Tehnomanija	3	3	0	0	0	47	36	+11	9	Group stage	—	—	21–14	15–12
2	(Romania) CSM Oradea (H)	3	1	1	0	1	35	34	+1	5	Group stage	10–11	—	19–16 (Note: Match ended 14–14. CSM Oradea won 4–2 on penalties.)	10–8
3	(Germany) Spandau 04	3	1	0	1	1	42	42	0	4		—	—	—	13–6
4	(France) Team Strasbourg	3	0	0	0	3	26	38	−12	0		—	—	—	—

Source: European Aquatics Champions League
(H) Host

18 September 2026; 18:00	Report	Novi Beograd Tehnomanija (Serbia)	15–12	(France) Team Strasbourg	Ioan Alexandrescu, Oradea; Referees: Maro Savinovic (CRO), Natalia Markopoulou (GRE)
18 September 2026; 18:00	Report	Score by quarters: 2–1, 5–4, 5–4, 3–3			Ioan Alexandrescu, Oradea; Referees: Maro Savinovic (CRO), Natalia Markopoulou (GRE)
18 September 2026; 18:00	Report	Martinović 6	Goals	Crippa 4	Ioan Alexandrescu, Oradea; Referees: Maro Savinovic (CRO), Natalia Markopoulou (GRE)

18 September 2026; 20:00	Report	CSM Oradea (Romania)	19–17 (PSO)	(Germany) Spandau 04	Ioan Alexandrescu, Oradea; Referees: Maxim Gerasimov (GBR), Raffaele Colombo (ITA)
18 September 2026; 20:00	Report	Score by quarters: 3–3, 3–5, 3–2, 6–5 PSO: 4–2			Ioan Alexandrescu, Oradea; Referees: Maxim Gerasimov (GBR), Raffaele Colombo (ITA)
18 September 2026; 20:00	Report	Fulea 4	Goals	Hofmann 4	Ioan Alexandrescu, Oradea; Referees: Maxim Gerasimov (GBR), Raffaele Colombo (ITA)

19 September 2026; 18:00	Report	Novi Beograd Tehnomanija (Serbia)	21–14	(Germany) Spandau 04	Ioan Alexandrescu, Oradea; Referees: Raffaele Colombo (ITA), Natalia Markopoulou (GRE)
19 September 2026; 18:00	Report	Score by quarters: 6–6, 7–3, 5–3, 3–2			Ioan Alexandrescu, Oradea; Referees: Raffaele Colombo (ITA), Natalia Markopoulou (GRE)
19 September 2026; 18:00	Report	Urosević, Martinović 4	Goals	Andruskiewicz 5	Ioan Alexandrescu, Oradea; Referees: Raffaele Colombo (ITA), Natalia Markopoulou (GRE)

19 September 2026; 20:00	Report	Team Strasbourg (France)	8–10	(Romania) CSM Oradea	Ioan Alexandrescu, Oradea; Referees: Maxim Gerasimov (GBR), Maro Savinovic (CRO)
19 September 2026; 20:00	Report	Score by quarters: 1–3, 2–3, 0–2, 5–2			Ioan Alexandrescu, Oradea; Referees: Maxim Gerasimov (GBR), Maro Savinovic (CRO)
19 September 2026; 20:00	Report	Stojanović, Crippa 2	Goals	three players 2	Ioan Alexandrescu, Oradea; Referees: Maxim Gerasimov (GBR), Maro Savinovic (CRO)

20 September 2026; 10:30	Report	Spandau 04 (Germany)	13–6	(France) Team Strasbourg	Ioan Alexandrescu, Oradea; Referees: Natalia Markopoulou (GRE), Maxim Gerasimov (GBR)
20 September 2026; 10:30	Report	Score by quarters: 3–2, 4–2, 3–2, 3–0			Ioan Alexandrescu, Oradea; Referees: Natalia Markopoulou (GRE), Maxim Gerasimov (GBR)
20 September 2026; 10:30	Report	Culina 3	Goals	Stojanović 3	Ioan Alexandrescu, Oradea; Referees: Natalia Markopoulou (GRE), Maxim Gerasimov (GBR)

20 September 2026; 12:30	Report	CSM Oradea (Romania)	10–11	(Serbia) Novi Beograd Tehnomanija	Ioan Alexandrescu, Oradea; Referees: Raffaele Colombo (ITA), Maro Savinovic (CRO)
20 September 2026; 12:30	Report	Score by quarters: 1–4, 3–3, 3–4, 3–0			Ioan Alexandrescu, Oradea; Referees: Raffaele Colombo (ITA), Maro Savinovic (CRO)
20 September 2026; 12:30	Report	Kholod 3	Goals	Martinović 4	Ioan Alexandrescu, Oradea; Referees: Raffaele Colombo (ITA), Maro Savinovic (CRO)

=== Group B ===
18–20 September 2026, Tbilisi, Georgia

Pos	Team	Pld	W	PSW	PSL	L	GF	GA	GD	Pts	Qualification	BRE	SAB	MAN	BUD
1	(Italy) AN Brescia	3	2	0	1	0	54	49	+5	7	Group stage	—	16–15	—	—
2	(Spain) Astralpool CN Sabadell	3	2	0	0	1	57	40	+17	6	Group stage	—	—	—	20–12
3	(Georgia (country)) A-Polo Sport Management (H)	3	1	0	0	2	48	59	−11	3		17–21	12–22	—	19–16
4	(Montenegro) PVK Budvanska Rivijera	3	0	1	0	2	45	56	−11	2		21–18 (Note: Match ended 17–17. PVK Budvanska Rivijera won 4–1 on penalties.)	—	—	—

Source: European Aquatics Champions League
(H) Host

18 September 2026; 17:00	Report	AN Brescia (Italy)	16–15	(Spain) Astralpool CN Sabadell	Kutaisi Olympic Swimming Pool, Tbilisi; Referees: Tamas Kovacs-Csaltos (HUN), Sebastien Dervieux (FRA)
18 September 2026; 17:00	Report	Score by quarters: 4–3, 5–5, 4–2, 3–5			Kutaisi Olympic Swimming Pool, Tbilisi; Referees: Tamas Kovacs-Csaltos (HUN), Sebastien Dervieux (FRA)
18 September 2026; 17:00	Report	Ferrero 4	Goals	Valera 5	Kutaisi Olympic Swimming Pool, Tbilisi; Referees: Tamas Kovacs-Csaltos (HUN), Sebastien Dervieux (FRA)

18 September 2026; 19:00	Report	A-Polo Sport Management (Georgia (country))	19–16	(Montenegro) PVK Budvanska Rivijera	Kutaisi Olympic Swimming Pool, Tbilisi; Referees: Mihai Balanescu (ROU), Konstantinos Vasileiou (GRE)
18 September 2026; 19:00	Report	Score by quarters: 4–4, 4–5, 5–3, 6–4			Kutaisi Olympic Swimming Pool, Tbilisi; Referees: Mihai Balanescu (ROU), Konstantinos Vasileiou (GRE)
18 September 2026; 19:00	Report	Draskovic 6	Goals	Đurđić 4	Kutaisi Olympic Swimming Pool, Tbilisi; Referees: Mihai Balanescu (ROU), Konstantinos Vasileiou (GRE)

19 September 2026; 17:00	Report	Astralpool CN Sabadell (Spain)	20–12	(Montenegro) PVK Budvanska Rivijera	Kutaisi Olympic Swimming Pool, Tbilisi; Referees: Sebastien Dervieux (FRA), Mihai Balanescu (ROU)
19 September 2026; 17:00	Report	Score by quarters: 7–5, 6–2, 5–2, 2–3			Kutaisi Olympic Swimming Pool, Tbilisi; Referees: Sebastien Dervieux (FRA), Mihai Balanescu (ROU)
19 September 2026; 17:00	Report	Valera 5	Goals	Mršić 7	Kutaisi Olympic Swimming Pool, Tbilisi; Referees: Sebastien Dervieux (FRA), Mihai Balanescu (ROU)

19 September 2026; 19:00	Report	A-Polo Sport Management (Georgia (country))	17–21	(Italy) AN Brescia	Kutaisi Olympic Swimming Pool, Tbilisi; Referees: Tamas Kovacs-Csaltos (HUN), Konstantinos Vasileiou (GRE)
19 September 2026; 19:00	Report	Score by quarters: 5–4, 5–5, 4–4, 3–8			Kutaisi Olympic Swimming Pool, Tbilisi; Referees: Tamas Kovacs-Csaltos (HUN), Konstantinos Vasileiou (GRE)
19 September 2026; 19:00	Report	Moskov 6	Goals	Leinweber 6	Kutaisi Olympic Swimming Pool, Tbilisi; Referees: Tamas Kovacs-Csaltos (HUN), Konstantinos Vasileiou (GRE)

20 September 2026; 17:00	Report	PVK Budvanska Rivijera (Montenegro)	21–18 (PSO)	(Italy) AN Brescia	Kutaisi Olympic Swimming Pool, Tbilisi; Referees: Levan Berishvili (GEO), Mihai Balanescu (ROU)
20 September 2026; 17:00	Report	Score by quarters: 4–3, 5–4, 3–5, 5–5 PSO: 4–1			Kutaisi Olympic Swimming Pool, Tbilisi; Referees: Levan Berishvili (GEO), Mihai Balanescu (ROU)
20 September 2026; 17:00	Report	Mršić 6	Goals	Leinweber 7	Kutaisi Olympic Swimming Pool, Tbilisi; Referees: Levan Berishvili (GEO), Mihai Balanescu (ROU)

20 September 2026; 19:00	Report	A-Polo Sport Management (Georgia (country))	12–22	(Spain) Astralpool CN Sabadell	Kutaisi Olympic Swimming Pool, Tbilisi; Referees: Tamas Kovacs-Csaltos (HUN), Sebastien Dervieux (FRA)
20 September 2026; 19:00	Report	Score by quarters: 3–5, 3–5, 2–7, 4–5			Kutaisi Olympic Swimming Pool, Tbilisi; Referees: Tamas Kovacs-Csaltos (HUN), Sebastien Dervieux (FRA)
20 September 2026; 19:00	Report	Gardašević 5	Goals	Averka 7	Kutaisi Olympic Swimming Pool, Tbilisi; Referees: Tamas Kovacs-Csaltos (HUN), Sebastien Dervieux (FRA)

=== Group C ===
18–20 September 2026, Split, Croatia

Pos	Team	Pld	W	PSW	PSL	L	GF	GA	GD	Pts	Qualification	PAN	SPL	HON
1	(Greece) Panathinaikos	2	2	0	0	0	24	21	+3	6	Group stage	—	—	9–7
2	(Croatia) Jadran Split (H)	2	1	0	0	1	26	21	+5	3	Group stage	14–15	—	12–6
3	(Hungary) Endo Plus Service Honvéd	2	0	0	0	2	13	21	−8	0		—	—	—

Source: European Aquatics Champions League
(H) Host

18 September 2026; 20:00	Report	Jadran Split (Croatia)	14–15	(Greece) Panathinaikos	Sports Center Poljud, Split; Referees: Michiel Zwart (NED), Daniele Bianco (ITA)
18 September 2026; 20:00	Report	Score by quarters: 4–4, 2–3, 3–4, 5–4			Sports Center Poljud, Split; Referees: Michiel Zwart (NED), Daniele Bianco (ITA)
18 September 2026; 20:00	Report	Matković 4	Goals	Nikolaidis 4	Sports Center Poljud, Split; Referees: Michiel Zwart (NED), Daniele Bianco (ITA)

19 September 2026; 20:00	Report	Panathinaikos (Greece)	9–7	(Hungary) Endo Plus Service Honvéd	Sports Center Poljud, Split; Referees: Daniele Bianco (ITA), Veselin Miskovic (MNE)
19 September 2026; 20:00	Report	Score by quarters: 2–1, 2–1, 3–3, 2–2			Sports Center Poljud, Split; Referees: Daniele Bianco (ITA), Veselin Miskovic (MNE)
19 September 2026; 20:00	Report	Chalyvopoulos 3	Goals	Vadovics, Vickovic 2	Sports Center Poljud, Split; Referees: Daniele Bianco (ITA), Veselin Miskovic (MNE)

20 September 2026; 12:00	Report	Endo Plus Service Honvéd (Hungary)	6–12	(Croatia) Jadran Split	Sports Center Poljud, Split; Referees: Michiel Zwart (NED), Veselin Miskovic (MNE)
20 September 2026; 12:00	Report	Score by quarters: 2–4, 3–3, 1–4, 0–1			Sports Center Poljud, Split; Referees: Michiel Zwart (NED), Veselin Miskovic (MNE)
20 September 2026; 12:00	Report	Ekler 3	Goals	five players 2	Sports Center Poljud, Split; Referees: Michiel Zwart (NED), Veselin Miskovic (MNE)

=== Matchday reports ===
Reference
Matchday 1
Matchday 2
Matchday 3

== See also ==
- 2026–27 European Aquatics Champions League
