= 2023–24 LEN Champions League quarter-finals round =

Tournament information
- Sport: Water polo
- Dates: 8 March–15 May 2024
- Website: Official website

The 2023–24 LEN Champions League quarter-finals round is played between 8 March and 15 May 2024 to determine the four teams advancing to the Final four of the 2023–24 LEN Champions League.

== Format ==
The four group winners and four group runners-up were drawn into two groups, with each one containing two group winners and two group runners-up. In each group, teams will play against each other home-and-away in a round-robin format. The top two teams in each group advanced to the Final four.

Teams are ranked according to points (3 points for a win, 2 points for a penalty shootout win, 1 point for a penalty shootout loss, 0 points for a loss), and if tied on points, the following tiebreaking criteria are applied, in the order given, to determine the rankings:

- Points in head-to-head matches among tied teams;
- Goal difference in head-to-head matches among tied teams;
- Goals scored in head-to-head matches among tied teams;
- Goal difference in all group matches;
- Goals scored in all group matches.

== Draw ==
The draw took place in Barcelona on 15 December 2023. The seeded and unseeded clubs consist of the teams that finished first and second in the previous round respectively. The only restriction was that clubs from the same group in the Main round could not be drawn against each other.

Key to colours
Group winners and runners-up advance to Final four

Seeded Team (Serbia) Novi Beograd (Italy) Pro Recco (Hungary) FTC-Telekom (Spain) Zodiac Atlètic-Barceloneta	Unseeded Team (Italy) AN Brescia (Greece) Olympiacos Piraeus (Croatia) Jadran Split (France) CN Marseille

== Groups ==
=== Group A ===
Pos	Team	Pld	W	PSW	PSL	L	GF	GA	GD	Pts	Qualification	(Italy) PRO	(Serbia) NOV	(France) MAR	(Croatia) JAD
1	(Italy) Pro Recco	6	5	1	0	0	88	58	+30	17	Final four	—	15–7	15–8	18–9
2	(Serbia) Novi Beograd	6	4	0	1	1	78	74	+4	13	Final four	14–15 (Note: Match ended 10–10, Pro Recco won 5–4 on penalties)	—	13–10	15–11
3	(France) CN Marseille	6	2	0	0	4	72	76	−4	6		10–12	13–14	—	17–10
4	(Croatia) Jadran Split	6	0	0	0	6	62	92	−30	0		10–13	10–15	12–14	—

Source: LEN Champions League

8 March 2024; 18:30	Report	Pro Recco (Italy)	15–8	(France) CN Marseille	Recco, Italy; Referees: Boris Margeta (SLO), Christos Kourtidis (GRE)
8 March 2024; 18:30	Report	Score by quarters: 5–2, 2–1, 5–1, 3–4			Recco, Italy; Referees: Boris Margeta (SLO), Christos Kourtidis (GRE)
8 March 2024; 18:30	Report	Cannella, Younger 3	Goals	Crousillat, Vukičević 2	Recco, Italy; Referees: Boris Margeta (SLO), Christos Kourtidis (GRE)

8 March 2024; 19:45	Report	Novi Beograd (Serbia)	15–11	(Croatia) Jadran Split	Belgrade, Serbia; Referees: David Gomez (ESP), Gyorgy Kun (HUN)
8 March 2024; 19:45	Report	Score by quarters: 5–1, 3–1, 3–5, 4–4			Belgrade, Serbia; Referees: David Gomez (ESP), Gyorgy Kun (HUN)
8 March 2024; 19:45	Report	Granados 6	Goals	Harkov 3	Belgrade, Serbia; Referees: David Gomez (ESP), Gyorgy Kun (HUN)

19 March 2024; 18:00	Report	Jadran Split (Croatia)	10–13	(Italy) Pro Recco	Split, Croatia; Referees: Adrian Tiberiu Alexandrescu (ROU), Radoslaw Koryzna (POL)
19 March 2024; 18:00	Report	Score by quarters: 1–3, 1–3, 3–2, 5–5			Split, Croatia; Referees: Adrian Tiberiu Alexandrescu (ROU), Radoslaw Koryzna (POL)
19 March 2024; 18:00	Report	Fatović 3	Goals	Ivović 4	Split, Croatia; Referees: Adrian Tiberiu Alexandrescu (ROU), Radoslaw Koryzna (POL)

19 March 2024; 18:00	Report	CN Marseille (France)	13–14	(Serbia) Novi Beograd	Marseille, France; Referees: Frank Ohme (GER), Nikolaos Boudramis (GRE)
19 March 2024; 18:00	Report	Score by quarters: 3–4, 4–1, 4–5, 2–4			Marseille, France; Referees: Frank Ohme (GER), Nikolaos Boudramis (GRE)
19 March 2024; 18:00	Report	Crousillat 4	Goals	Granados 6	Marseille, France; Referees: Frank Ohme (GER), Nikolaos Boudramis (GRE)

2 April 2024; 19:00	Report	Jadran Split (Croatia)	12–14	(France) CN Marseille	Split, Croatia; Referees: Georgios Stavridis (GRE), Gyorgy Kun (HUN)
2 April 2024; 19:00	Report	Score by quarters: 3–4, 3–2, 1–3, 5–5			Split, Croatia; Referees: Georgios Stavridis (GRE), Gyorgy Kun (HUN)
2 April 2024; 19:00	Report	Kragić 3	Goals	Prlainović 5	Split, Croatia; Referees: Georgios Stavridis (GRE), Gyorgy Kun (HUN)

2 April 2024; 19:45	Report	Novi Beograd (Serbia)	14–15 (PSO)	(Italy) Pro Recco	Belgrade, Serbia; Referees: Xavier F. Buch (ESP), Michiel Zwart (NED)
2 April 2024; 19:45	Report	Score by quarters: 1–1, 1–6, 3–2, 5–1 PSO: 4–5			Belgrade, Serbia; Referees: Xavier F. Buch (ESP), Michiel Zwart (NED)
2 April 2024; 19:45	Report	Skoumpakis 3	Goals	Cannella 3	Belgrade, Serbia; Referees: Xavier F. Buch (ESP), Michiel Zwart (NED)

24 April 2024; 19:00	Report	Jadran Split (Croatia)	10–15	(Serbia) Novi Beograd	Split, Croatia; Referees: Tamas Kovacs-Csatlos (HUN), Pau Segurana (ESP)
24 April 2024; 19:00	Report	Score by quarters: 3–4, 4–5, 1–5, 2–1			Split, Croatia; Referees: Tamas Kovacs-Csatlos (HUN), Pau Segurana (ESP)
24 April 2024; 19:00	Report	Fatović, Kragić 2	Goals	Jakšić 4	Split, Croatia; Referees: Tamas Kovacs-Csatlos (HUN), Pau Segurana (ESP)

24 April 2024; 20:00	Report	CN Marseille (France)	10–12	(Italy) Pro Recco	Marseille, France; Referees: Georgios Stavridis (GRE), Jaume Teixido (ESP)
24 April 2024; 20:00	Report	Score by quarters: 1–2, 2–1, 4–4, 3–5			Marseille, France; Referees: Georgios Stavridis (GRE), Jaume Teixido (ESP)
24 April 2024; 20:00	Report	Crousillat 4	Goals	Hallock 3	Marseille, France; Referees: Georgios Stavridis (GRE), Jaume Teixido (ESP)

4 May 2024; 18:00	Report	Pro Recco (Italy)	18–9	(Croatia) Jadran Split	Recco, Italy; Referees: Veselin Miskovic (MNE), Spyridon Achladiotis (GRE)
4 May 2024; 18:00	Report	Score by quarters: 2–2, 6–3, 6–1, 4–3			Recco, Italy; Referees: Veselin Miskovic (MNE), Spyridon Achladiotis (GRE)
4 May 2024; 18:00	Report	Condemi 4	Goals	Butić 3	Recco, Italy; Referees: Veselin Miskovic (MNE), Spyridon Achladiotis (GRE)

4 May 2024; 19:45	Report	Novi Beograd (Serbia)	13–10	(France) CN Marseille	Belgrade, Serbia; Referees: Tamas Kovacs-Csatlos (HUN), Xavier Buch (ESP)
4 May 2024; 19:45	Report	Score by quarters: 3–2, 3–3, 4–3, 3–2			Belgrade, Serbia; Referees: Tamas Kovacs-Csatlos (HUN), Xavier Buch (ESP)
4 May 2024; 19:45	Report	Granados 5	Goals	Crousillat 3	Belgrade, Serbia; Referees: Tamas Kovacs-Csatlos (HUN), Xavier Buch (ESP)

15 May 2024; 19:00	Report	Pro Recco (Italy)	15–7	(Serbia) Novi Beograd	Recco, Italy; Referees: Frank Ohme (GER), Gad Shimon Schwartz (ISR)
15 May 2024; 19:00	Report	Score by quarters: 3–2, 5–2, 4–1, 3–2			Recco, Italy; Referees: Frank Ohme (GER), Gad Shimon Schwartz (ISR)
15 May 2024; 19:00	Report	Cannella 5	Goals	Granados 3	Recco, Italy; Referees: Frank Ohme (GER), Gad Shimon Schwartz (ISR)

15 May 2024; 20:00	Report	CN Marseille (France)	17–10	(Croatia) Jadran Split	Marseille, France; Referees: Boris Margeta (SLO), Konstantinos Vasileiou (GRE)
15 May 2024; 20:00	Report	Score by quarters: 5–2, 5–3, 3–3, 4–2			Marseille, France; Referees: Boris Margeta (SLO), Konstantinos Vasileiou (GRE)
15 May 2024; 20:00	Report	three players	Goals	Kragić 4	Marseille, France; Referees: Boris Margeta (SLO), Konstantinos Vasileiou (GRE)

=== Group B ===
Pos	Team	Pld	W	PSW	PSL	L	GF	GA	GD	Pts	Qualification	(Hungary) FTC	(Greece) OLY	(Spain) BAR	(Italy) BRE
1	(Hungary) FTC-Telekom	6	5	0	0	1	62	55	+7	15	Final four	—	11–9	13–11	9–8
2	(Greece) Olympiacos Piraeus	6	4	1	0	1	78	68	+10	14	Final four	10–8	—	10–7	17–12
3	(Spain) Zodiac Atlètic-Barceloneta	6	2	0	1	3	68	65	+3	7		8–10	18–19 (Note: Match ended 13–13, Olympiacos Piraeus won 6–5 on penalties)	—	12–8
4	(Italy) AN Brescia	6	0	0	0	6	54	74	−20	0		9–11	12–13	5–12	—

Source: LEN Champions League

9 March 2024; 12:30	Report	Zodiac Atlètic-Barceloneta (Spain)	12–8	(Italy) AN Brescia	Barcelona, Spain; Referees: Nenad Peris (CRO), Frank Ohme (GER)
9 March 2024; 12:30	Report	Score by quarters: 3–1, 4–3, 1–1, 4–3			Barcelona, Spain; Referees: Nenad Peris (CRO), Frank Ohme (GER)
9 March 2024; 12:30	Report	Perrone 3	Goals	three players 2	Barcelona, Spain; Referees: Nenad Peris (CRO), Frank Ohme (GER)

9 March 2024; 20:30	Report	FTC-Telekom (Hungary)	11–9	(Greece) Olympiacos Piraeus	Budapest, Hungary; Referees: Vojin Putniković (SRB), Sebastien Dervieux (FRA)
9 March 2024; 20:30	Report	Score by quarters: 3–2, 2–2, 2–0, 4–5			Budapest, Hungary; Referees: Vojin Putniković (SRB), Sebastien Dervieux (FRA)
9 March 2024; 20:30	Report	Argyropoulos 4	Goals	Genidounias 4	Budapest, Hungary; Referees: Vojin Putniković (SRB), Sebastien Dervieux (FRA)

20 March 2024; 19:30	Report	Olympiacos Piraeus (Greece)	10–7	(Spain) Zodiac Atlètic-Barceloneta	Piraeus, Greece; Referees: Boris Margeta (SLO), Michiel Zwart (NED)
20 March 2024; 19:30	Report	Score by quarters: 4–2, 2–0, 2–2, 2–3			Piraeus, Greece; Referees: Boris Margeta (SLO), Michiel Zwart (NED)
20 March 2024; 19:30	Report	Genidounias 5	Goals	Munárriz 3	Piraeus, Greece; Referees: Boris Margeta (SLO), Michiel Zwart (NED)

20 March 2024; 20:00	Report	AN Brescia (Italy)	9–11	(Hungary) FTC-Telekom	Brescia, Italy; Referees: Andrej Franulovic (CRO), Julien Bourges (FRA)
20 March 2024; 20:00	Report	Score by quarters: 3–3, 1–1, 1–2, 4–5			Brescia, Italy; Referees: Andrej Franulovic (CRO), Julien Bourges (FRA)
20 March 2024; 20:00	Report	Irving 4	Goals	three players 2	Brescia, Italy; Referees: Andrej Franulovic (CRO), Julien Bourges (FRA)

3 April 2024; 19:30	Report	Zodiac Atlètic-Barceloneta (Spain)	8–10	(Hungary) FTC-Telekom	Barcelona, Spain; Referees: Nenad Peris (CRO), Frank Ohme (GER)
3 April 2024; 19:30	Report	Score by quarters: 1–1, 2–3, 3–2, 2–4			Barcelona, Spain; Referees: Nenad Peris (CRO), Frank Ohme (GER)
3 April 2024; 19:30	Report	Munárriz 3	Goals	Gergő 3	Barcelona, Spain; Referees: Nenad Peris (CRO), Frank Ohme (GER)

3 April 2024; 20:00	Report	AN Brescia (Italy)	12–13	(Greece) Olympiacos Piraeus	Brescia, Italy
3 April 2024; 20:00	Report	Score by quarters: 4–4, 3–4, 3–4, 2–1			Brescia, Italy
3 April 2024; 20:00	Report	Irving 4	Goals	Vámos 3	Brescia, Italy

23 April 2024; 17:00	Report	Olympiacos Piraeus (Greece)	10–8	(Hungary) FTC-Telekom	Piraeus, Greece; Referees: Peris Nenad (CRO), Julien Bourges (FRA)
23 April 2024; 17:00	Report	Score by quarters: 1–1, 4–1, 3–3, 2–3			Piraeus, Greece; Referees: Peris Nenad (CRO), Julien Bourges (FRA)
23 April 2024; 17:00	Report	Gkilas 3	Goals	Mandić 2	Piraeus, Greece; Referees: Peris Nenad (CRO), Julien Bourges (FRA)

23 April 2024; 20:00	Report	AN Brescia (Italy)	5–12	(Spain) Zodiac Atlètic-Barceloneta	Brescia, Italy; Referees: Andrej Franulovic (CRO), Ivan Rakovic (SRB)
23 April 2024; 20:00	Report	Score by quarters: 2–3, 1–4, 0–2, 2–3			Brescia, Italy; Referees: Andrej Franulovic (CRO), Ivan Rakovic (SRB)
23 April 2024; 20:00	Report	Gianazza 2	Goals	Munárriz 4	Brescia, Italy; Referees: Andrej Franulovic (CRO), Ivan Rakovic (SRB)

3 May 2024; 18:30	Report	Zodiac Atlètic-Barceloneta (Spain)	18–19 (PSO)	(Greece) Olympiacos Piraeus	Barcelona, Spain; Referees: Sebastien Dervieux (FRA), Vojin Putniković (SRB)
3 May 2024; 18:30	Report	Score by quarters: 3–3, 2–1, 4–2, 3–5 PSO: 5–6			Barcelona, Spain; Referees: Sebastien Dervieux (FRA), Vojin Putniković (SRB)
3 May 2024; 18:30	Report	three players 3	Goals	Genidounias 5	Barcelona, Spain; Referees: Sebastien Dervieux (FRA), Vojin Putniković (SRB)

3 May 2024; 20:00	Report	FTC-Telekom (Hungary)	9–8	(Italy) AN Brescia	Budapest, Hungary; Referees: Adrian Tiberiu Alexandrescu (ROU), Frank Ohme (GER)
3 May 2024; 20:00	Report	Score by quarters: 2–1, 2–2, 3–2, 2–3			Budapest, Hungary; Referees: Adrian Tiberiu Alexandrescu (ROU), Frank Ohme (GER)
3 May 2024; 20:00	Report	Mandić 3	Goals	three players 2	Budapest, Hungary; Referees: Adrian Tiberiu Alexandrescu (ROU), Frank Ohme (GER)

14 May 2024; 18:30	Report	Olympiacos Piraeus (Greece)	17–12	(Italy) AN Brescia	Piraeus, Greece; Referees: Peris Nenad (CRO), Veselin Miskovic (MNE)
14 May 2024; 18:30	Report	Score by quarters: 6–5, 5–3, 4–3, 2–1			Piraeus, Greece; Referees: Peris Nenad (CRO), Veselin Miskovic (MNE)
14 May 2024; 18:30	Report	three players 3	Goals	Irving 4	Piraeus, Greece; Referees: Peris Nenad (CRO), Veselin Miskovic (MNE)

14 May 2024; 20:00	Report	FTC-Telekom (Hungary)	13–11	(Spain) Zodiac Atlètic-Barceloneta	Budapest, Hungary; Referees: Andrej Franulovic (CRO), Julien Bourges (FRA)
14 May 2024; 20:00	Report	Score by quarters: 3–3, 5–1, 1–3, 4–4			Budapest, Hungary; Referees: Andrej Franulovic (CRO), Julien Bourges (FRA)
14 May 2024; 20:00	Report	Vendel 4	Goals	Pavillard, Sanahuja 3	Budapest, Hungary; Referees: Andrej Franulovic (CRO), Julien Bourges (FRA)

== See also ==
- 2023–24 LEN Euro Cup
- 2023–24 LEN Challenger Cup
- 2023 LEN Super Cup
- 2023–24 LEN Women's Champions League
- 2023–24 LEN Women's Euro Cup
- 2023–24 LEN Women's Challenger Cup
- 2023 Women's LEN Super Cup
