= 2026–27 European Aquatics Champions League =

Water polo sports season

European Aquatics Champions League
- 2026–27

Tournament information
- Sport: Water polo
- Date: Qualification round: 18–20 September 2026; Group stage: 6 October – 16 December 2026; Quarter-finals round: 2 February – 20 April 2027; Final Four: 13–15 May 2027
- Tournament format(s): Round Robin and Knockout stage
- Teams: Qualification round: 11 (Note: From 11 countries); Main round: 16 (Note: From 10 countries); Quarter-finals round: 8 Total: 21 (from 11 countries)
- Website: Official website

The 2026–27 European Aquatics Champions League is the 64th edition of European Aquatics's premier competition for men's water polo clubs, and the 16th edition since being rebranded from the Euroleague to the Champions League. The season began on 18 September 2026 and will end on 15 May 2027 with the Final Four.

The winners of the European Aquatics Champions League will automatically qualify for next season's edition (if they choose to enter) and also will qualify for the 2027 Super Cup.

Zodiac Atlètic-Barceloneta are the defending champions.

== Format ==
- Qualification round

Eleven teams participate in the qualification round in September 2026. The runners-up from national leagues ranked 1–10 and A-Polo Sport Management, the champions of Georgia take part. The teams were divided into three separate groups, held in centralised venues. After round robin play, the top two teams in each group progressed to the group stage.

- Group stage

Sixteen teams will play in the group stage which will be held between October to December 2026. The champions of national leagues ranked 1–10 plus the six clubs who advanced from the qualification round will compete. The participants were distributed into four groups of four. After home and away double round robin play, the top two from each group will qualify for the quarter-finals round while the bottom two will drop down to the 2026–27 European Aquatics Euro Cup knockout stage.

- Quarter-finals round

The eight advancing teams from the previous round will be present and will be split into two groups of four. The round will be organized between February and April 2027. After home and away double round robin play, the top two from each group will qualify for the Final Four.

- Final Four

In May 2027, the four remaining clubs will travel to Serbia's capital, Belgrade, to try and obtain the Champions League trophy. Two semifinals, a third place game and final will take place to decide the champions.

== Rankings ==
The results were based on the results of the past four seasons.

- Associations 1–10 can have two teams ranked 1st and 2nd qualify.
- Associations 11–12 can have one team ranked 1st qualify.

Rank	Association	Points	Teams
1	Italy	97,527.5	2
2	Hungary	81,337.5	2
3	Spain	77,410	2
4	Serbia	69,680	2
5	Greece	66,635	2
6	Croatia	63,177.5	2
7	France	36,745	2
8	Romania	26,700	2
9	Germany	25,400	2
10	Montenegro	24,565	2
11	(Georgia (country)) Georgia	9,727.5	1
12	Turkey	8,110	0
13	Netherlands	7,065	0
14	Portugal	5,380	0
15	Slovenia	4,590	0

Rank	Association	Points	Teams
16	Lithuania	4,410	0
17	Malta	3,747	0
18	Switzerland	3,095	0
19	Slovakia	2,900	0
20	Israel	2,410	0
21	Belgium	2,375	0
22	(United Kingdom) Great Britain	2,210	0
23	Finland	1,835	0
24	Cyprus	1,675	0
25	Bosnia and Herzegovina	1,635	0
26	Denmark	280	0
27	Bulgaria	185	0

=== Ranking facts ===
Biggest rise
Pos	Team	Ori	New	Move
1	Malta	23	17	▲ +6
2	Denmark	29	26	▲ +3

Biggest fall
Pos	Team	Ori	New	Move
1	Switzerland	15	18	▼ –3
1	(United Kingdom) Great Britain	19	22	▼ –3
3	Cyprus	22	24	▼ –2

New entries
None

Leaving entries
Russia
Poland

== Teams ==
The Champions League and Euro Cup winners are granted a place in the Champions League group stage and qualification round respectively (however, both spots was not used as both clubs in question qualified via winning their domestic league).

In the event that a club decides not to enter, the third place team is not allowed to take their place.

=== Qualified teams ===
The labels in the parentheses show how each team qualified for the place of its starting round:

- CL: Champions League title holders
- EC: Euro Cup title holders
- 1st, 2nd,: League positions of the previous season

Entry round	Teams			
Main round	(Italy) Pro Recco (1st)	(Hungary) FTC-Telekom (1st)	(Spain) Zodiac Atlètic-Barceloneta ^{CL} (1st)	(Serbia) Radnički Kragujevac (1st)
Main round	(Greece) Olympiacos SF Piraeus (1st)	(Croatia) HAVK Mladost Zagreb (1st)	(France) CN Marseille ^{EC} (1st)	(Romania) Steaua București (1st)
Main round	(Germany) Waspo'98 Hannover (1st)	(Montenegro) Jadran m:tel Herceg Novi (1st)		
Qualification round	(Italy) AN Brescia (2nd)	(Hungary) Endo Plus Service Honvéd (2nd)	(Spain) Astralpool CN Sabadell (2nd)	(Serbia) Novi Beograd Tehnomanija (2nd)
Qualification round	(Greece) Panathinaikos (2nd)	(Croatia) Jadran Split (2nd)	(France) Team Strasbourg (2nd)	(Romania) CSM Oradea (2nd)
Qualification round	(Germany) Spandau 04 (2nd)	(Montenegro) PVK Budvanska Rivijera (2nd)	(Georgia (country)) A-Polo Sport Management (1st)	

== Round and draw dates ==
=== Schedule ===
Phase	Round	Draw dates	Round date
Qualification round	All rounds	14 August 2026	18–20 September 2026
Group stage	Matchday 1	21 September 2026	6–7 October 2026
Group stage	Matchday 2	21 September 2026	27–28 October 2026
Group stage	Matchday 3	21 September 2026	10–11 November 2026
Group stage	Matchday 4	21 September 2026	17–18 November 2026
Group stage	Matchday 5	21 September 2026	1–2 December 2026
Group stage	Matchday 6	21 September 2026	16 December 2026
Quarter-finals round	Matchday 1	TBA	2–3 February 2027
Quarter-finals round	Matchday 2	TBA	9–10 February 2027
Quarter-finals round	Matchday 3	TBA	23–24 March 2027
Quarter-finals round	Matchday 4	TBA	TBA
Quarter-finals round	Matchday 5	TBA	TBA
Quarter-finals round	Matchday 6	TBA	20–21 April 2027
Final Four	Semifinals	TBA	13 May 2027
Final Four	Final	TBA	15 May 2027

== Qualification round ==
The group winners and runners-up qualify for the group stage, while everyone else drops down to the Euro Cup group stage. The draw was on 14 August 2026 in Zagreb, Croatia. The seeding is based on the club rankings.

=== Group A ===
18–20 September 2026, Oradea, Romania

Pos	Team	Pld	W	PSW	PSL	L	GF	GA	GD	Pts	Qualification	NOV	ORA	SPA	STR
1	(Serbia) Novi Beograd Tehnomanija	3	3	0	0	0	47	36	+11	9	Group stage	—	—	21–14	15–12
2	(Romania) CSM Oradea (H)	3	1	1	0	1	35	34	+1	5	Group stage	10–11	—	19–16 (Note: Match ended 14–14. CSM Oradea won 4–2 on penalties.)	10–8
3	(Germany) Spandau 04	3	1	0	1	1	42	42	0	4		—	—	—	13–6
4	(France) Team Strasbourg	3	0	0	0	3	26	38	−12	0		—	—	—	—

Source: European Aquatics Champions League
(H) Host

=== Group B ===
18–20 September 2026, Tbilisi, Georgia

Pos	Team	Pld	W	PSW	PSL	L	GF	GA	GD	Pts	Qualification	BRE	SAB	MAN	BUD
1	(Italy) AN Brescia	3	2	0	1	0	54	49	+5	7	Group stage	—	16–15	—	—
2	(Spain) Astralpool CN Sabadell	3	2	0	0	1	57	40	+17	6	Group stage	—	—	—	20–12
3	(Georgia (country)) A-Polo Sport Management (H)	3	1	0	0	2	48	59	−11	3		17–21	12–22	—	19–16
4	(Montenegro) PVK Budvanska Rivijera	3	0	1	0	2	45	56	−11	2		21–18 (Note: Match ended 17–17. PVK Budvanska Rivijera won 4–1 on penalties.)	—	—	—

Source: European Aquatics Champions League
(H) Host

=== Group C ===
18–20 September 2026, Split, Croatia

Pos	Team	Pld	W	PSW	PSL	L	GF	GA	GD	Pts	Qualification	PAN	SPL	HON
1	(Greece) Panathinaikos	2	2	0	0	0	24	21	+3	6	Group stage	—	—	9–7
2	(Croatia) Jadran Split (H)	2	1	0	0	1	26	21	+5	3	Group stage	14–15	—	12–6
3	(Hungary) Endo Plus Service Honvéd	2	0	0	0	2	13	21	−8	0		—	—	—

Source: European Aquatics Champions League
(H) Host

== Group stage ==
Location of teams of the 2026–27 European Aquatics Champions League group stage.
Red: Group A; Blue: Group B; Yellow: Group C; Green: Group D

The top two from each group make the quarter-finals round. The bottom two from each group drops down to the Euro Cup eighth-finals.

=== Draw ===
The draw was on 21 September 2026 in Zagreb, Croatia. The seeding is based on the club rankings. Teams in bold advanced to the quarter-finals round.

Pot 1	Pot 2	Pot 3	Pot 4
(Hungary) FTC-Telekom (Spain) Zodiac Atlètic-Barceloneta (Italy) Pro Recco (Greece) Olympiacos SF Piraeus	(France) CN Marseille (Croatia) HAVK Mladost Zagreb (Serbia) Radnički Kragujevac (Germany) Waspo'98 Hannover	(Italy) AN Brescia (Serbia) Novi Beograd Tehnomanija (Montenegro) Jadran m:tel Herceg Novi	(Croatia) Jadran Split (Spain) Astralpool CN Sabadell (Romania) CSM Oradea (Romania) Steaua București (Greece) Panathinaikos

=== Group A ===
Pos	Team	Pld	W	PSW	PSL	L	GF	GA	GD	Pts	Qualification	OLY	JAD	SAB	HAN
1	(Greece) Olympiacos Piraeus	4	3	1	0	0	59	46	+13	**11**	Advance to Quarter-finals round	—	19–17 (Note: Match ended 14–14. Olympiacos Piraeus won 5–3 on penalties.)	15–10	13–12
2	(Montenegro) Jadran m:tel Herceg Novi	4	2	0	1	1	59	53	+6	**7**	Advance to Quarter-finals round		—	16–17	
3	(Spain) Astralpool CN Sabadell	4	2	0	0	2	49	51	−2	**6**	Transfer to Euro Cup		10–11	—	12–9
4	(Germany) Waspo'98 Hannover	4	0	0	0	4	43	60	−17	**0**	Transfer to Euro Cup	10–17	12–18		—

Updated to match(es) played on 18 November 2026. Source: European Aquatics Champions League

=== Group B ===
Pos	Team	Pld	W	PSW	PSL	L	GF	GA	GD	Pts	Qualification	RAD	PRO	BRE	ORA
1	(Serbia) Radnički Kragujevac	4	4	0	0	0	63	42	+21	**12**	Advance to Quarter-finals round	—	16–14	18–8	15–11
2	(Italy) Pro Recco	4	3	0	0	1	57	46	+11	**9**	Advance to Quarter-finals round		—	12–7	15–10
3	(Italy) AN Brescia	4	1	0	0	3	45	61	−16	**3**	Transfer to Euro Cup		13–16	—	
4	(Romania) CSM Oradea	4	0	0	0	4	45	61	−16	**0**	Transfer to Euro Cup	9–14		15–17	—

Updated to match(es) played on 18 November 2026. Source: European Aquatics Champions League

=== Group C ===
Pos	Team	Pld	W	PSW	PSL	L	GF	GA	GD	Pts	Qualification	ZOD	MLA	NOV	SPL
1	(Spain) Zodiac Atlètic-Barceloneta	4	4	0	0	0	66	41	+25	**12**	Advance to Quarter-finals round	—	16–5	15–12	
2	(Croatia) HAVK Mladost Zagreb	4	2	0	1	1	45	49	−4	**7**	Advance to Quarter-finals round		—		17–18 (Note: Match ended 14–14. Jadran Split won 4–3 on penalties.)
3	(Serbia) Novi Beograd Tehnomanija	4	1	0	0	3	54	57	−3	**3**	Transfer to Euro Cup	17–18	9–13	—	16–11
4	(Croatia) Jadran Split	4	0	1	0	3	42	60	−18	**2**	Transfer to Euro Cup	7–17	10–13		—

Updated to match(es) played on 17 November 2026. Source: European Aquatics Champions League

=== Group D ===
Pos	Team	Pld	W	PSW	PSL	L	GF	GA	GD	Pts	Qualification	MAR	FTC	PAN	STE
1	(France) CN Marseille	4	3	0	0	1	50	45	+5	**9**	Advance to Quarter-finals round	—	12–10	12–11	
2	(Hungary) FTC-Telekom	4	3	0	0	1	70	43	+27	**9**	Advance to Quarter-finals round		—		23–7
3	(Greece) Panathinaikos	4	2	0	0	2	64	57	+7	**6**	Transfer to Euro Cup	14–12	14–19	—	25–14
4	(Romania) Steaua București	4	0	0	0	4	41	80	−39	**0**	Transfer to Euro Cup	10–14	10–18		—

Updated to match(es) played on 17 November 2026. Source: European Aquatics Champions League

== Quarter-finals round ==
The four group winners and four group runners-up will be drawn into two groups, with each one containing two group winners and two group runners-up. The top two teams in each group will advance to the Final Four.

== Final Four ==
The tournament will be held on the 13–15 May 2027 at the 11 April Sports Complex in Belgrade, Serbia.

== See also ==
- 2026–27 European Aquatics Euro Cup
- 2026–27 European Aquatics Conference Cup
- 2026–27 European Aquatics Challenger Cup
- 2026 European Aquatics Super Cup
- 2026–27 European Aquatics Women's Champions League
- 2026–27 European Aquatics Women's Euro Cup
- 2026–27 European Aquatics Women's Conference Cup
- 2026–27 European Aquatics Women's Challenger Cup
- 2026 European Aquatics Women's Super Cup
