= Yusuke Inaba =

Japanese water polo player (born 2000)

Personal information
- Nationality: Japan
- Born: 11 April 2000 (age 26) Toyama, Japan
- Height: 175 cm (5 ft 9 in)

Sport
- Sport: Water polo
- Club: CC Ortigia
Medal record
Men's water polo
Representing Japan
Asian Games
Gold medal – first place	2022 Hangzhou	Team
Gold medal – first place	2026 Aichi–Nagoya	Team
Silver medal – second place	2018 Jakarta	Team

Yusuke Inaba (稲場 悠介, Inaba Yūsuke, born 11 April 2000) is a Japanese water polo player.

He competed in the 2020 Summer Olympics and 2024 Summer Olympics.

== Career ==
Born in Toyama, Japan in 2000. Graduated from Toyama Municipal Horikawa Junior High School and Daiichi Gakuin High School, a correspondence school.

In 2017, he joined VK Budva in Montenegro, and in 2018, he moved to CSM Digi Oradea in Romania. He won a silver medal at the 2018 Asian Games held in Jakarta, Indonesia in 2018.

He was the top scorer in the FINA Water Polo World League for two consecutive years in 2018 and 2019, and was the top scorer for the third time in the 2021 World League. In 2021, he participated in the 2020 Summer Olympics held in Japan.

He won a gold medal at the 2022 Asian Games held in Hangzhou, China in 2022. He participated as the ace of the Japanese national team at the Paris Olympics held in France in 2024.

He participated as the captain of the Japanese national team at the 2025 World Championships held in Singapore in July 2025.

== Club ==
- 2017 (Mauritania) VK Budva
- 2018-2019 (Romania) CSM Digi Oradea
- 2020 (Italy) Sporting Club Quinto
- 2021-2022 (Italy) Pallanuoto Trieste
- 2023- (Italy) CC Ortigia
