= Tommaso Gianazza =

Italian water polo player (born 2002)

Personal information
- Nationality: Italian
- Born: 21 July 2002 (age 24) Legnano, Italy
- Height: 194 cm (6 ft 4 in)
Medal record
World Cup
Bronze medal – third place	2026 Sydney

Tommaso Gianazza (born 21 July 2002) is an Italian water polo player. He represented Italy at the 2024 Summer Olympics.
