= Sporting Club Quinto =

- Founded: 1921; 105 years ago
- League: Serie A1
- Based in: Genoa, Italy
- Arena: Piscina Marco Paganuzzi (Capacity: 2,500)
- Colors
- President: Giorgio Giorgi
- Head coach: Luca Bittarello
- Website: scquinto.com

Sporting Club Quinto is an Italian water polo club from Quinto, quartiere of Genoa in Liguria. Currently it plays in Serie A1.

== History ==
Sporting Club Quinto was founded in 1921.

== Current team ==
- (Italy) Nicolò Scanu
- (Italy) Federico Accardo
- (Italy) Armando Turbati
- (Italy) Giacomo Boero
- (Italy) Francesco Brambilla
- (Italy) Andrea Amelio
- (Italy) Alessandro Brambilla
- (Italy) Luca Bittarello
- (Italy) Matteo Spigno
- (Serbia) Srdjan Aksentijevic

== Famous players ==
- (Italy) Marco Paganuzzi

== Famous coaches ==
- (Italy) Marco Paganuzzi
