= SN Strasbourg =

French water polo team

Team Strasbourg SNS-ASPTT-PCS
- League: Championnat de France
- Based in: Strasbourg
- Arena: Piscine de la Kibitzenau (1,000 seats)
- Championships: 7 French national championships
- Website: snstrasbourg.fr

The Société de natation de Strasbourg (SNS) is a French professional Water polo team based in Strasbourg. The team competes in the Championnat de France, the highest level of Water polo in France. There, Strasbourg has been a top contender. The team plays its home games in the Piscine de la Kibitzenau.

== Titles ==
- Championnat de France (7)
  - 1958, 1959, 1960, 1961, 1963, 2018, 2019

== Notable players ==
To appear in this section a player must have either:

– Set a club record or won an individual award as a professional player.
– Played at least one official international match for his senior national team at any time.

- (France) Mathieu Dierstein
- (France) Brice Boust
- (France) Alexandre Chevalier
- (France) Romain Blary
- (France) Sebastien Berenguel
- (France) Jimmy Tomasini
- (France) Thibaut Simon
- (France) Yannick Rolland
- (France) Hugo Fontani
- (France) (Malta) Aurélien Cousin
- (Republic of Ireland) Tom Coughlan
- (Republic of Ireland) Colum Lavelle
- (Tunisia) Mohamed Chaouachi
- (Montenegro) Vlado Popadic
- (Montenegro) Marko Petković
- (Belgium) Steven Vitrant
- (North Macedonia) (Montenegro) Saša Mišić
- (New Zealand) Zane McAlpine
