= CC Ortigia =

- Founded: 1928; 98 years ago
- League: Serie A1
- Arena: Piscina Paolo Calderella (Capacity: 1,300)
- Colors
- Championships: 2 LEN Trophies
- Website: canottieriortigia.it

Circolo Canottieri Ortigia, also known as Ortigia Siracusa, is an Italian professional water polo club from Syracuse established in 1928. The club's women's team won two LEN Trophies in 2004 and 2005.

== Titles ==
- Men:
  - COMEN Cup (2)
    - 2000, 2001
- Women:
  - LEN Trophy (2)
    - 2004, 2005
