= 2022–23 LEN Euro Cup =

Secondary European water polo cup

- League: LEN Euro Cup
- Sport: Water Polo
- Duration: 13 October 202–29 April 2023
- Finals champions: (Hungary) A-Híd Vasas Plaket
- Runners-up: (Italy) RN Savona

Euro Cup seasons
- ← 2021–22 2023–24 →

The 2022–23 LEN Euro Cup is the 31st edition of the second-tier European tournament for men's water polo clubs. And it is the first year with the expanded format and presence of the LEN Challenger Cup. The winners were A-Híd Vasas Plaket of Hungary, who defeated RN Savona of Italy on aggregate 23-15 in the final.

== Teams ==
Eighth-Finals
| (Greece) Panionios GSS (CL Q3) | (France) CN Noisy-le-Sec (CL Q3) | (Hungary) A-Híd Vasas Plaket (CL Q3) | (Romania) CSM Oradea (CL Q3) |

Qualification Round II
| (Montenegro) Jadran Herceg Novi (CL Q2) | (Spain) CN Barcelona (CL Q2) | (France) EN Tourcoing (CL Q2) | (Romania) Steaua Bucharest (CL Q2) |
| (Montenegro) Primorac Kotor (CL Q2) | (Italy) RN Savona (CL Q2) | (Lithuania) EVK Zaibas (CL Q2) | (Portugal) Vitória Sport Clube (CL Q2) |
| (Serbia) VK Šabac (CL Q2) | (Croatia) HAVK Mladost Zagreb (CL Q2) | (Germany) ASC Duisburg (CL Q2) | |

Qualification Round I
| (France) Team Strasbourg | (Italy) Telimar Palermo | (Spain) Tenerife Echeyde | (Netherlands) ZV De Zaan |
| (France) Montpellier WP | (Italy) CC Ortigia | (Spain) CN Terrassa | (Serbia) VK Valis |
| (France) Pays D'Aix Natation | (Italy) Pallanuoto Trieste | (Spain) CE Mediterrani | (Serbia) Partizan Beograd |
| (Germany) Ludwigsburg 08 | (Greece) NC Ydraikos | (Hungary) Szolnoki Dózsa | (Serbia) BVK Crvena Zvezda |
| (Slovenia) Triglav Kranj | (Greece) PAOK Thessaloniki | (Hungary) BVSC Zugló | (Croatia) Solaris Šibenik |
| (Slovakia) SKP Kosice | (Greece) GS Apollon Smyrnis | (Hungary) Budapesti Honvéd | |

== Schedule ==
The schedule of the competition is as follows.

| Phase | Round | First leg | Second leg |
|---|---|---|---|
| Qualifying rounds | Qualification round I | 13–16 October 2022 | |
| Qualifying rounds | Qualification round II | 28–30 October 2022 | |
| Knockout phase | Eighth-finals | 30 November 2022 | 14 December 2022 |
| Knockout phase | Quarterfinals | 25 January 2023 | 8 February 2023 |
| Knockout phase | Semifinals | 1 March 2023 | 22 March 2023 |
| Knockout phase | Finals | 15 April 2023 | 29 April 2023 |

== Qualifying rounds ==
=== Qualification round I ===
The top four ranked sides from each group advance. The 5th and 6th place teams continue in the LEN Challenger Cup

==== Group A ====
- 13–16 October 2022, Thessaloniki, Greece.

| Pos | Team | Pld | W | D | L | GF | GA | GD | Pts | Qualification | (Croatia) SOL | (Netherlands) DEZ | (Greece) PAO | (France) MON | (Germany) LUD | (Spain) TEN |
|---|---|---|---|---|---|---|---|---|---|---|---|---|---|---|---|---|
| 1 | (Croatia) Solaris Šibenik | 5 | 4 | 1 | 0 | 54 | 36 | +18 | 13 | Round II | — | 9–5 | — | 10–9 | 11–5 | — |
| 2 | (Netherlands) ZV De Zaan | 5 | 3 | 1 | 1 | 49 | 42 | +7 | 10 (Note: PAOK Thessaloniki 6-7 ZV De Zaan) | Round II | — | — | — | 10–10 | 16–7 | — |
| 3 | (Greece) PAOK Thessaloniki | 5 | 3 | 1 | 1 | 48 | 37 | +11 | 10 | Round II | 9–9 | 6–7 | — | 13–8 | 12–6 | 8–7 |
| 4 | (France) Montpellier WP | 5 | 2 | 1 | 2 | 50 | 45 | +5 | 7 | Round II | — | — | — | — | — | 15–7 |
| 5 | (Germany) Ludwigsburg 08 | 5 | 1 | 0 | 4 | 38 | 60 | −22 | 3 | Challenger Cup | — | — | — | 5–8 | — | 15–13 |
| 6 | (Spain) Tenerife Echeyde | 5 | 0 | 0 | 5 | 45 | 64 | −19 | 0 | Challenger Cup | 8–15 | 10–11 | — | — | — | — |

Source: LEN

==== Group B ====
- 13–16 October 2022, Syracuse, Sicily, Italy.

| Pos | Team | Pld | W | D | L | GF | GA | GD | Pts | Qualification | (Italy) ORT | (Serbia) PAR | (Hungary) SZO | (France) PAY | (Greece) YDR |
|---|---|---|---|---|---|---|---|---|---|---|---|---|---|---|---|
| 1 | (Italy) CC Ortigia | 4 | 4 | 0 | 0 | 59 | 31 | +28 | 12 | Round II | — | — | — | 12–5 | — |
| 2 | (Serbia) Partizan Beograd | 4 | 3 | 0 | 1 | 51 | 45 | +6 | 9 | Round II | 7–14 | — | — | 20–11 | — |
| 3 | (Hungary) Szolnoki Dózsa | 4 | 2 | 0 | 2 | 44 | 31 | +13 | 6 | Round II | 9–11 | 8–10 | — | — | — |
| 4 | (France) Pays D'Aix Natation | 4 | 1 | 0 | 3 | 38 | 52 | −14 | 3 | Round II | — | — | 7–11 | — | 15–9 |
| 5 | (Greece) NC Ydraikos | 4 | 0 | 0 | 4 | 34 | 67 | −33 | 0 | Challenger Cup | 10–22 | 12–14 | 3–16 | — | — |

Source: LEN

==== Group C ====
- 13–16 October 2022, Kranj, Slovenia.

| Pos | Team | Pld | W | D | L | GF | GA | GD | Pts | Qualification | (France) STR | (Hungary) HON | (Italy) PAL | (Serbia) VAL | (Spain) TER | (Slovenia) KRA |
|---|---|---|---|---|---|---|---|---|---|---|---|---|---|---|---|---|
| 1 | (France) Team Strasbourg | 5 | 5 | 0 | 0 | 66 | 46 | +20 | 15 | Round II | — | 12–9 | — | — | — | — |
| 2 | (Hungary) Budapesti Honvéd | 5 | 4 | 0 | 1 | 64 | 39 | +25 | 12 | Round II | — | — | — | 11–6 | 11–7 | — |
| 3 | (Italy) Telimar Palermo | 5 | 3 | 0 | 2 | 89 | 67 | +22 | 9 | Round II | 13–16 | 11–12 | — | 24–16 | 18–15 | — |
| 4 | (Serbia) VK Valis | 5 | 2 | 0 | 3 | 51 | 64 | −13 | 6 | Round II | 10–13 | — | — | — | — | — |
| 5 | (Spain) CN Terrassa | 5 | 1 | 0 | 4 | 57 | 57 | 0 | 3 | Challenger Cup | 11–14 | — | — | 10–11 | — | — |
| 6 | (Slovenia) Triglav Kranj | 5 | 0 | 0 | 5 | 23 | 77 | −54 | 0 | Challenger Cup | 3–11 | 3–21 | 8–23 | 6–8 | 3–14 | — |

Source: LEN

==== Group D ====
- 13–16 October 2022, Barcelona, Spain.

| Pos | Team | Pld | W | D | L | GF | GA | GD | Pts | Qualification | (Serbia) BVK | (Italy) TRI | (Hungary) ZUG | (Spain) CEM | (Greece) APO | (Slovakia) KOS |
|---|---|---|---|---|---|---|---|---|---|---|---|---|---|---|---|---|
| 1 | (Serbia) BVK Crvena Zvezda | 5 | 5 | 0 | 0 | 66 | 30 | +36 | 15 | Round II | — | 11–8 | — | 13–3 | — | 24–4 |
| 2 | (Italy) Pallanuoto Trieste | 5 | 4 | 0 | 1 | 69 | 42 | +27 | 12 | Round II | — | — | 10–7 | 9–6 | — | 29–10 |
| 3 | (Hungary) BVSC-Zugló | 5 | 3 | 0 | 2 | 69 | 48 | +21 | 9 | Round II | 7–8 | — | — | — | — | — |
| 4 | (Spain) CE Mediterrani | 5 | 2 | 0 | 3 | 49 | 54 | −5 | 6 | Round II | — | — | 13–14 | — | — | 17–9 |
| 5 | (Greece) GS Apollon Smyrnis | 5 | 1 | 0 | 4 | 71 | 54 | +17 | 3 | Challenger Cup | 8–10 | 8–13 | 13–15 | 9–10 | — | 34–10 |
| 6 | (Slovakia) SKP Kosice | 5 | 0 | 0 | 5 | 34 | 130 | −96 | 0 | Challenger Cup | — | — | 5–26 | — | — | — |

Source: LEN

=== Qualification round II ===
The qualified teams from Qualification Round I and the eliminated teams from the 2022-23 LEN Champions League Qualification Round I & II. The top two ranked sides from each group advance to the eighth-finals.

==== Group A ====
- 27–30 October 2022, Šabac, Serbia

| Pos | Team | Pld | W | D | L | GF | GA | GD | Pts | Qualification | (Serbia) ŠAB | (Italy) TRI | (Montenegro) JAD | (Croatia) SOL | (France) PAY |
|---|---|---|---|---|---|---|---|---|---|---|---|---|---|---|---|
| 1 | (Serbia) VK Šabac | 4 | 4 | 0 | 0 | 46 | 25 | +21 | 12 | Eighth-Final | — | 10–9 | — | 16–6 | — |
| 2 | (Italy) Pallanuoto Trieste | 4 | 3 | 0 | 1 | 52 | 31 | +21 | 9 | Eighth-Final | — | — | — | 16–6 | 16–6 |
| 3 | (Montenegro) Jadran Herceg Novi | 4 | 2 | 0 | 2 | 39 | 29 | +10 | 6 | | 5–9 | 9–11 | — | — | — |
| 4 | (Croatia) VK Solaris Sibenik | 4 | 1 | 0 | 3 | 28 | 57 | −29 | 3 | | — | — | 2–15 | — | 14–10 |
| 5 | (France) Pays D'Aix Natation | 4 | 0 | 0 | 4 | 28 | 51 | −23 | 0 | | 5–11 | — | 7–10 | — | — |

Source: LEN

==== Group B ====
- 28–30 October 2022, Strasbourg, France.

| Pos | Team | Pld | W | D | L | GF | GA | GD | Pts | Qualification | (Italy) SAV | (Serbia) PAR | (France) STR | (Netherlands) DEZ |
|---|---|---|---|---|---|---|---|---|---|---|---|---|---|---|
| 1 | (Italy) RN Savona | 3 | 2 | 1 | 0 | 34 | 27 | +7 | 7 | Eighth-Final | — | — | — | 14–10 |
| 2 | (Serbia) Partizan Beograd | 3 | 2 | 0 | 1 | 40 | 34 | +6 | 6 | Eighth-Final | 11–14 | — | — | — |
| 3 | (France) Team Strasbourg | 3 | 1 | 1 | 1 | 27 | 27 | 0 | 4 | | 6–6 | 9–12 | — | 12–9 |
| 4 | (Netherlands) ZV De Zaan | 3 | 0 | 0 | 3 | 30 | 43 | −13 | 0 | | — | 11–17 | — | — |

Source: LEN

==== Group C ====
- 28–30 October 2022, Duisburg, Germany.

| Pos | Team | Pld | W | D | L | GF | GA | GD | Pts | Qualification | (France) TOU | (Spain) BAR | (Italy) PAL | (Germany) DUI |
|---|---|---|---|---|---|---|---|---|---|---|---|---|---|---|
| 1 | (France) EN Tourcoing | 3 | 3 | 0 | 0 | 49 | 34 | +15 | 9 | Eighth-Final | — | 14–11 | 14–12 | 21–11 |
| 2 | (Spain) CN Barcelona | 3 | 2 | 0 | 1 | 39 | 39 | 0 | 6 | Eighth-Final | — | — | — | 16–14 |
| 3 | (Italy) Telimar Palermo | 3 | 1 | 0 | 2 | 34 | 36 | −2 | 3 | | — | 11–12 | — | 11–10 |
| 4 | (Germany) ASC Duisburg | 3 | 0 | 0 | 3 | 35 | 48 | −13 | 0 | | — | — | — | — |

Source: LEN

==== Group D ====
- 27–30 October 2022, Zagreb, Croatia.

| Pos | Team | Pld | W | D | L | GF | GA | GD | Pts | Qualification | (Hungary) HON | (Montenegro) PRI | (Spain) CEM | (Greece) PAO | (Croatia) ZAG |
|---|---|---|---|---|---|---|---|---|---|---|---|---|---|---|---|
| 1 | (Hungary) Budapesti Honvéd | 4 | 3 | 0 | 1 | 43 | 33 | +10 | 9 | Eighth-Final | — | — | — | 10–9 | — |
| 2 | (Montenegro) Primorac Kotor | 4 | 2 | 0 | 2 | 40 | 35 | +5 | 6 | Eighth-Final | 6–7 | — | — | — | — |
| 3 | (Spain) CE Mediterrani | 4 | 1 | 2 | 1 | 37 | 45 | −8 | 5 | | 6–15 | 12–11 | — | 9–9 | — |
| 4 | (Greece) PAOK Thessaloniki | 4 | 1 | 1 | 2 | 36 | 41 | −5 | 4 (Note: PAOK Thessaloniki 11-9 HVAK Mladost Zagreb) | | — | 7–13 | — | — | — |
| 5 | (Croatia) HVAK Mladost Zagreb | 4 | 1 | 1 | 2 | 40 | 42 | −2 | 4 | | 12–11 | 9–10 | 10–10 | 9–11 | — |

Source: LEN

==== Group E ====
- 28–30 October 2022, Szolnok, Hungary.

| Pos | Team | Pld | W | D | L | GF | GA | GD | Pts | Qualification | (Hungary) SZO | (Serbia) BVK | (France) MON | (Lithuania) ZAI |
|---|---|---|---|---|---|---|---|---|---|---|---|---|---|---|
| 1 | (Hungary) Szolnoki Dózsa | 3 | 3 | 0 | 0 | 46 | 21 | +25 | 9 | Eighth-Final | — | 10–6 | 15–7 | 21–8 |
| 2 | (Serbia) BVK Crvena Zvezda | 3 | 2 | 0 | 1 | 27 | 21 | +6 | 6 | Eighth-Final | — | — | — | — |
| 3 | (France) Montpellier WP | 3 | 1 | 0 | 2 | 27 | 35 | −8 | 3 | | — | 7–12 | — | 13–8 |
| 4 | (Lithuania) EVK Zaibas | 3 | 0 | 0 | 3 | 20 | 43 | −23 | 0 | | — | 4–9 | — | — |

Source: LEN

==== Group F ====
- 27–30 October 2022, Bucharest, Romania.

| Pos | Team | Pld | W | D | L | GF | GA | GD | Pts | Qualification | (Italy) ORT | (Romania) BUC | (Hungary) ZUG | (Serbia) VAL | (Portugal) VIT |
|---|---|---|---|---|---|---|---|---|---|---|---|---|---|---|---|
| 1 | (Italy) CC Ortigia | 4 | 4 | 0 | 0 | 58 | 26 | +32 | 12 | Eighth-Final | — | 10–8 | 9–8 | — | 25–1 |
| 2 | (Romania) Steaua Bucharest | 4 | 3 | 0 | 1 | 42 | 33 | +9 | 9 | Eighth-Final | — | — | 8–7 | 12–11 | 14–5 |
| 3 | (Hungary) BVSC-Zugló | 4 | 2 | 0 | 2 | 56 | 28 | +28 | 6 | | — | — | — | 18–8 | 23–3 |
| 4 | (Serbia) VK Valis | 4 | 1 | 0 | 3 | 49 | 52 | −3 | 3 | | 9–14 | — | — | — | 21–8 |
| 5 | (Portugal) Vitória Sport Clube | 4 | 0 | 0 | 4 | 17 | 83 | −66 | 0 | | — | — | — | — | — |

Source: LEN

== Knockout stage ==
=== Bracket ===
Eighth-finals
(Serbia) Partizan Beograd | 12 | 8 | 20
(Greece) Panionios GSS | 11 | 12 | 23
(Romania) CSM Oradea | 8 | 10 | 18
(Romania) Steaua Bucharest | 8 | 6 | 14
(Hungary) A-Híd Vasas Plaket | 15 | 7 | 22
(Serbia) BVK Crvena Zvezda | 10 | 11 | 21
(Serbia) VK Šabac | 13 | 11 | 24
(Spain) CN Barcelona | 10 | 12 | 22
(France) CN Noisy-le-Sec | 12 | 13 | 25
(Italy) Pallanuoto Trieste | 20 | 16 | 36
(Hungary) Szolnoki Dózsa | 11 | 8 | 19
(Hungary) Budapesti Honvéd | 12 | 5 | 17
(Italy) RN Savona | 7 | 9 | 16
(Italy) CC Ortigia | 2 | 13 | 15
(France) EN Tourcoing | 7 | 15 | 22
(Montenegro) Primorac Kotor | 7 | 11 | 18

Quarter-finals
(Greece) Panionios GSS (p) | 10 | 8 | 18 (25)
(Romania) CSM Oradea | 5 | 13 | 18 (24)
(Hungary) A-Híd Vasas Plaket | 10 | 9 | 19
(Serbia) VK Šabac | 9 | 6 | 15
(Italy) Pallanuoto Trieste | 13 | 11 | 24
(Hungary) Szolnoki Dózsa | 12 | 10 | 22
(Italy) RN Savona | 8 | 13 | 21
(France) EN Tourcoing | 5 | 10 | 15

Semi-finals
(Greece) Panionios GSS | 9 | 6 | 15
(Hungary) A-Híd Vasas Plaket | 8 | 12 | 20
(Italy) Pallanuoto Trieste | 9 | 12 | 21
(Italy) RN Savona | 9 | 13 | 22

Final
(Hungary) A-Híd Vasas Plaket | 8 | 15 | 23
(Italy) RN Savona | 8 | 7 | 15

=== Eighth-finals ===
The twelve best teams from the 2nd qualification round of the Euro Cup and the four eliminated teams from the Champions League 3rd Qualification Round were drawn into 8 pairings, played on a home & away leg.

| Team 1 | Agg. | Team 2 | 1st leg | 2nd leg |
|---|---|---|---|---|
| Partizan Beograd (Serbia) | 20–23 | (Greece) Panionios GSS | 12–11 | 8–12 |
| CSM Oradea (Romania) | 18–14 | (Romania) Steaua Bucarest | 8–8 | 10–6 |
| A-Híd Vasas Plaket (Hungary) | 22–21 | (Serbia) BVK Crvena Zvezda | 15–10 | 7–11 |
| VK Šabac (Serbia) | 24–22 | (Spain) CN Barcelona | 13–10 | 11–12 |
| CN Noisy-le-Sec (France) | 25–36 | (Italy) Pallanuoto Trieste | 12–20 | 13–16 |
| Szolnoki Dózsa (Hungary) | 19–17 | (Hungary) Budapesti Honvéd | 11–12 | 8–5 |
| RN Savona (Italy) | 16–15 | (Italy) CC Ortigia | 7–2 | 9–13 |
| EN Tourcoing (France) | 22–18 | (Montenegro) Primorac Kotor | 7–7 | 15–11 |

==== Leg 1 ====
| 30 November 2022; 18:00 | Report | (Serbia) Partizan Beograd | 12–11 | (Greece) Panionios GSS | Belgrade, Serbia; Referees: Pascal Bouchez (FRA), Gyorgy Kun (HUN) |
| 30 November 2022; 18:00 | Report | Score by quarters: 5–1, 3–5, 3–3, 1–2 | | | Belgrade, Serbia; Referees: Pascal Bouchez (FRA), Gyorgy Kun (HUN) |
| 30 November 2022; 18:00 | Report | Gounas, Kopeliadis 3 | Goals | Dimitrijevic, Smiljevic 3 | Belgrade, Serbia; Referees: Pascal Bouchez (FRA), Gyorgy Kun (HUN) |

| 30 November 2022; 20:00 | Report | (Romania) Steaua Bucarest | 8–8 | (Romania) CSM Oradea | Bucharest, Romania; Referees: Stanko Ivanovski (MNE), Pau Segurana (SPA) |
| 30 November 2022; 20:00 | Report | Score by quarters: 2–4, 4–2, 0–0, 2–2 | | | Bucharest, Romania; Referees: Stanko Ivanovski (MNE), Pau Segurana (SPA) |
| 30 November 2022; 20:00 | Report | Gheorghe, Vuskovic 3 | Goals | Asanovic, Gheorghe 3 | Bucharest, Romania; Referees: Stanko Ivanovski (MNE), Pau Segurana (SPA) |

| 30 November 2022; 20:00 | Report | (Hungary) A-Híd Vasas Plaket | 15–10 | (Serbia) BVK Crvena Zvezda | Budapest, Hungary; Referees: Jaume Teixido (ESP), Massimo Calabro (ITA) |
| 30 November 2022; 20:00 | Report | Score by quarters: 3–1, 3–4, 4–1, 5–4 | | | Budapest, Hungary; Referees: Jaume Teixido (ESP), Massimo Calabro (ITA) |
| 30 November 2022; 20:00 | Report | three players 3 | Goals | four players 2 | Budapest, Hungary; Referees: Jaume Teixido (ESP), Massimo Calabro (ITA) |

| 30 November 2022; 18:00 | Report | (Serbia) VK Šabac | 13–10 | (Spain) CN Barcelona | Šabac, Serbia; Referees: Michail Birakis (GRE), Filippo Gomez (ITA) |
| 30 November 2022; 18:00 | Report | Score by quarters: 5–3, 3–2, 3–3, 2–2 | | | Šabac, Serbia; Referees: Michail Birakis (GRE), Filippo Gomez (ITA) |
| 30 November 2022; 18:00 | Report | Stojanovic 4 | Goals | Guell 5 | Šabac, Serbia; Referees: Michail Birakis (GRE), Filippo Gomez (ITA) |

| 30 November 2022; 20:00 | Report | (France) CN Noisy-le-Sec | 12–20 | (Italy) Pallanuoto Trieste | Noisy-Le-Sec, France; Referees: Radoslaw Koryzna (POL), Maro Savinovic (CRO) |
| 30 November 2022; 20:00 | Report | Score by quarters: 4–5, 2–5, 2–5, 4–5 | | | Noisy-Le-Sec, France; Referees: Radoslaw Koryzna (POL), Maro Savinovic (CRO) |
| 30 November 2022; 20:00 | Report | Bowen, Petkovic 5 | Goals | Inaba 4 | Noisy-Le-Sec, France; Referees: Radoslaw Koryzna (POL), Maro Savinovic (CRO) |

| 30 November 2022; 18:00 | Report | (Hungary) Budapesti Honvéd | 13–11 | (Hungary) Szolnoki Dózsa | Budapest, Hungary; Referees: Nikolaos Boudramis (GRE), Andreja Stanojevic (SRB) |
| 30 November 2022; 18:00 | Report | Score by quarters: 3–2, 4–4, 3–2, 3–3 | | | Budapest, Hungary; Referees: Nikolaos Boudramis (GRE), Andreja Stanojevic (SRB) |
| 30 November 2022; 18:00 | Report | Pásztor 6 | Goals | Ekler 5 | Budapest, Hungary; Referees: Nikolaos Boudramis (GRE), Andreja Stanojevic (SRB) |

| 30 November 2022; 15:00 | Report | (Italy) RN Savona | 7–2 | (Italy) CC Ortigia | Savona, Italy; Referees: Vuk Milovic (SRB), Andrej Franulovic (CRO) |
| 30 November 2022; 15:00 | Report | Score by quarters: 3–1, 1–1, 1–0, 1–0 | | | Savona, Italy; Referees: Vuk Milovic (SRB), Andrej Franulovic (CRO) |
| 30 November 2022; 15:00 | Report | Durdic 3 | Goals | Condemi, Puga 1 | Savona, Italy; Referees: Vuk Milovic (SRB), Andrej Franulovic (CRO) |

| 30 November 2022; 18:00 | Report | (Montenegro) Primorac Kotor | 7–7 | (France) EN Tourcoing | Kotor, Montenegro; Referees: Peter De Jong (NED), SCHOPP Hendrik Schopp (GER) |
| 30 November 2022; 18:00 | Report | Score by quarters: 2–4, 3–1, 1–0, 1–2 | | | Kotor, Montenegro; Referees: Peter De Jong (NED), SCHOPP Hendrik Schopp (GER) |
| 30 November 2022; 18:00 | Report | seven players 1 | Goals | Marzouki 3 | Kotor, Montenegro; Referees: Peter De Jong (NED), SCHOPP Hendrik Schopp (GER) |

==== Leg 2 ====
| 14 December 2022; 20:00 | Report | (Greece) Panionios GSS | 12–8 | (Serbia) Partizan Beograd | Athens, Greece; Referees: Paoletti Paoletti (ITA), Philip Uhlig (GER) |
| 14 December 2022; 20:00 | Report | Score by quarters: 3–1, 2–2, 5–3, 2–2 | | | Athens, Greece; Referees: Paoletti Paoletti (ITA), Philip Uhlig (GER) |
| 14 December 2022; 20:00 | Report | Gounas 6 | Goals | Smiljevic 3 | Athens, Greece; Referees: Paoletti Paoletti (ITA), Philip Uhlig (GER) |

| 14 December 2022; 18:00 | Report | (Romania) CSM Oradea | 10–6 | (Romania) Steaua Bucarest | Oradea, Romania; Referees: Christos Kourtidis (GRE), Laza Andjelic (SRB) |
| 14 December 2022; 18:00 | Report | Score by quarters: 4–3, 2–1, 1–0, 3–2 | | | Oradea, Romania; Referees: Christos Kourtidis (GRE), Laza Andjelic (SRB) |
| 14 December 2022; 18:00 | Report | four players 2 | Goals | Iudean, Vuskovic 2 | Oradea, Romania; Referees: Christos Kourtidis (GRE), Laza Andjelic (SRB) |

| 14 December 2022; 20:00 | Report | (Serbia) BVK Crvena Zvezda | 11–7 | (Hungary) A-Híd Vasas Plaket | Belgrade, Serbia; Referees: Julien Bourges (FRA), Veselin Miskovic (MNE) |
| 14 December 2022; 20:00 | Report | Score by quarters: 2–2, 3–2, 2–1, 4–2 | | | Belgrade, Serbia; Referees: Julien Bourges (FRA), Veselin Miskovic (MNE) |
| 14 December 2022; 20:00 | Report | Subotic, Vasic 2 | Goals | Randelovic 2 | Belgrade, Serbia; Referees: Julien Bourges (FRA), Veselin Miskovic (MNE) |

| 14 December 2022; 18:00 | Report | (Spain) CN Barcelona | 12–11 | (Serbia) VK Šabac | Barcelona, Spain; Referees: Matan Schwartz (ISR), Erwin Schapers (NED) |
| 14 December 2022; 18:00 | Report | Score by quarters: 1–3, 4–3, 3–4, 4–1 | | | Barcelona, Spain; Referees: Matan Schwartz (ISR), Erwin Schapers (NED) |
| 14 December 2022; 18:00 | Report | Ferrer 5 | Goals | Sulc 4 | Barcelona, Spain; Referees: Matan Schwartz (ISR), Erwin Schapers (NED) |

| 14 December 2022; 18:00 | Report | (Italy) Pallanuoto Trieste | 16–13 | (France) CN Noisy-le-Sec | Trieste, Italy; Referees: David Gomez (SPA), Ivan Rakovic (SRB) |
| 14 December 2022; 18:00 | Report | Score by quarters: 4–6, 3–3, 6–0, 3–4 | | | Trieste, Italy; Referees: David Gomez (SPA), Ivan Rakovic (SRB) |
| 14 December 2022; 18:00 | Report | Inaba 4 | Goals | three players 3 | Trieste, Italy; Referees: David Gomez (SPA), Ivan Rakovic (SRB) |

| 14 December 2022; 18:30 | Report | (Hungary) Szolnoki Dózsa | 8–5 | (Hungary) Budapesti Honvéd | Szolnok, Hungary; Referees: Robert Tiozzo (CRO), Oriol Jaumandreu (SPA) |
| 14 December 2022; 18:30 | Report | Score by quarters: 3–3, 2–0, 3–1, 0–1 | | | Szolnok, Hungary; Referees: Robert Tiozzo (CRO), Oriol Jaumandreu (SPA) |
| 14 December 2022; 18:30 | Report | Pásztor, Szeghalmi 3 | Goals | five players 1 | Szolnok, Hungary; Referees: Robert Tiozzo (CRO), Oriol Jaumandreu (SPA) |

| 14 December 2022; 18:00 | Report | (Italy) CC Ortigia | 13–9 | (Italy) RN Savona | Siracusa, Italy; Referees: Tamas Kovacs Csatlos (HUN), Gernot Haentschel (GER) |
| 14 December 2022; 18:00 | Report | Score by quarters: 4–3, 3–2, 2–1, 4–3 | | | Siracusa, Italy; Referees: Tamas Kovacs Csatlos (HUN), Gernot Haentschel (GER) |
| 14 December 2022; 18:00 | Report | Vidovic 4 | Goals | Durdic 3 | Siracusa, Italy; Referees: Tamas Kovacs Csatlos (HUN), Gernot Haentschel (GER) |

| 14 December 2022; 19:00 | Report | (France) EN Tourcoing | 15–11 | (Montenegro) Primorac Kotor | Tourcoing, France; Referees: Daniele Bianco (ITA), Georgios Konst. Polychronopoulos (GRE) |
| 14 December 2022; 19:00 | Report | 'Score by quarters: 4–3, 6–3, 4–2, 1–3 | | | Tourcoing, France; Referees: Daniele Bianco (ITA), Georgios Konst. Polychronopoulos (GRE) |
| 14 December 2022; 19:00 | Report | Marzouki 5 | Goals | Mrsic 3 | Tourcoing, France; Referees: Daniele Bianco (ITA), Georgios Konst. Polychronopoulos (GRE) |

=== Quarter-finals ===
| Team 1 | Agg. | Team 2 | 1st leg | 2nd leg |
|---|---|---|---|---|
| Panionios GSS (Greece) | 18–18 (25–24 p) | (Romania) CSM Oradea | 10–5 | 8–13 |
| A-Híd Vasas Plaket (Hungary) | 19–15 | (Serbia) VK Šabac | 10–9 | 9–6 |
| Szolnoki Dózsa (Hungary) | 22–24 | (Italy) Pallanuoto Trieste | 12–13 | 10–11 |
| EN Tourcoing (France) | 15–21 | (Italy) RN Savona | 5–8 | 10–13 |

==== Leg 1 ====
| 25 January 2023; 20:00 (EET) | Report | (Greece) Panionios GSS | 10–5 | (Romania) CSM Oradea | Athens, Greece; Referees: R. Colombo (ITA), J. Teixido (ESP) |
| 25 January 2023; 20:00 (EET) | Report | Score by quarters: 2–1, 3–2, 2–0, 3–2 | | | Athens, Greece; Referees: R. Colombo (ITA), J. Teixido (ESP) |
| 25 January 2023; 20:00 (EET) | Report | Papakos 3 | Goals | Negregan, Szabó 2 | Athens, Greece; Referees: R. Colombo (ITA), J. Teixido (ESP) |

| 25 January 2023; 18:30 (CET) | Report | (Hungary) A-Híd Vasas Plaket | 10–4 | (Serbia) VK Šabac | Budapest, Hungary; Referees: D. Bianco (ITA), T. Copic (CRO) |
| 25 January 2023; 18:30 (CET) | Report | Score by quarters: 3–0, 4–3, 2–0, 1–1 | | | Budapest, Hungary; Referees: D. Bianco (ITA), T. Copic (CRO) |
| 25 January 2023; 18:30 (CET) | Report | Negaev 3 | Goals | Repanovic 2 | Budapest, Hungary; Referees: D. Bianco (ITA), T. Copic (CRO) |

| 25 January 2023; 19:00 (CET) | Report | (Hungary) Szolnoki Dózsa | 12–13 | (Italy) Pallanuoto Trieste | Szolnok, Hungary; Referees: G. Hanetschel (GER), A. Stanojevic (SRB) |
| 25 January 2023; 19:00 (CET) | Report | Score by quarters: 3–2, 4–4, 4–4, 1–3 | | | Szolnok, Hungary; Referees: G. Hanetschel (GER), A. Stanojevic (SRB) |
| 25 January 2023; 19:00 (CET) | Report | Pásztor 3 | Goals | Inaba 5 | Szolnok, Hungary; Referees: G. Hanetschel (GER), A. Stanojevic (SRB) |

| 25 January 2023; 20:00 (CET) | Report | (France) EN Tourcoing | 5–8 | (Italy) RN Savona | Tourcoing, France |
| 25 January 2023; 20:00 (CET) | Report | Score by quarters: 0–3, 0–1, 2–2, 3–2 | | | Tourcoing, France |
| 25 January 2023; 20:00 (CET) | Report | Marzouki 3 | Goals | Rizzo, Durdic 2 | Tourcoing, France |

==== Leg 2 ====
| 8 February 2023; 17:00 (EET) | Report | (Romania) CSM Oradea | 19 (6)–15 (7) (PSO) | (Greece) Panionios GSS | Oradea, Romania |
| 8 February 2023; 17:00 (EET) | Report | Score by quarters: 3–1, 4–4, 3–2, 3–1 PSO: 6–7 | | | Oradea, Romania |
| 8 February 2023; 17:00 (EET) | Report | Negrean 5 | Goals | Gounas 5 | Oradea, Romania |

| 8 February 2023; 20:00 (CET) | Report | (Serbia) VK Šabac | 6–9 | (Hungary) A-Híd Vasas Plaket | Šabac, Serbia; Referees: O. Jaumandreu (ESP), H. Schopp (GER) |
| 8 February 2023; 20:00 (CET) | Report | Score by quarters: 1–2, 2–3, 0–1, 3–3 | | | Šabac, Serbia; Referees: O. Jaumandreu (ESP), H. Schopp (GER) |
| 8 February 2023; 20:00 (CET) | Report | Stojanovic 2 | Goals | Randelovic, Negaev 2 | Šabac, Serbia; Referees: O. Jaumandreu (ESP), H. Schopp (GER) |

| 8 February 2023; 20:00 (CET) | Report | (Italy) Pallanuoto Trieste | 11–10 | (Hungary) Szolnoki Dózsa | Trieste, Italy; Referees: R. Koryzna (POL), M. Savinovic (CRO) |
| 8 February 2023; 20:00 (CET) | Report | Score by quarters: 3–2, 4–3, 1–3, 3–2 | | | Trieste, Italy; Referees: R. Koryzna (POL), M. Savinovic (CRO) |
| 8 February 2023; 20:00 (CET) | Report | Mladossich 3 | Goals | Kovács 3 | Trieste, Italy; Referees: R. Koryzna (POL), M. Savinovic (CRO) |

| 8 February 2023; 19:00 (CET) | Report | (Italy) RN Savona | 13–10 | (France) EN Tourcoing | Savona, Italy; Referees: L. Andjelic (SRB), N. Boudramis (GRE) |
| 8 February 2023; 19:00 (CET) | Report | Score by quarters: 2–2, 3–1, 5–4, 3–3 | | | Savona, Italy; Referees: L. Andjelic (SRB), N. Boudramis (GRE) |
| 8 February 2023; 19:00 (CET) | Report | Durdic 6 | Goals | three players 2 | Savona, Italy; Referees: L. Andjelic (SRB), N. Boudramis (GRE) |

=== Semi-finals ===
| Team 1 | Agg. | Team 2 | 1st leg | 2nd leg |
|---|---|---|---|---|
| Panionios GSS (Greece) | 15–20 | (Hungary) A-Híd Vasas Plaket | 9–8 | 6–12 |
| Pallanuoto Trieste (Italy) | 21–22 | (Italy) RN Savona | 9–9 | 12–13 |

==== Leg 1 ====
| 1 March 2023; 20:00 (EET) | Report | (Greece) Panionios GSS | 9–8 | (Hungary) A-Híd Vasas Plaket | Athens, Greece; Referees: F. Ohme (GER), O. Jaumandreu (ESP) |
| 1 March 2023; 20:00 (EET) | Report | Score by quarters: 5–2, 1–2, 1–2, 2–2 | | | Athens, Greece; Referees: F. Ohme (GER), O. Jaumandreu (ESP) |
| 1 March 2023; 20:00 (EET) | Report | Gounas 4 | Goals | Konarik 3 | Athens, Greece; Referees: F. Ohme (GER), O. Jaumandreu (ESP) |

| 1 March 2023; 20:00 (CET) | Report | (Italy) Pallanuoto Trieste | 9–9 | (Italy) RN Savona | Trieste, Italy; Referees: P. Bouchez (FRA), A. Franulovic (CRO) |
| 1 March 2023; 20:00 (CET) | Report | Score by quarters: 1–2, 2–2, 4–2, 2–3 | | | Trieste, Italy; Referees: P. Bouchez (FRA), A. Franulovic (CRO) |
| 1 March 2023; 20:00 (CET) | Report | three players 2 | Goals | Duric 6 | Trieste, Italy; Referees: P. Bouchez (FRA), A. Franulovic (CRO) |

==== Leg 2 ====
| 22 March 2023; 20:00 (CET) | (Hungary) A-Híd Vasas Plaket | 12–6 | (Greece) Panionios GSS | Budapest, Hungary; Referees: Michiel Zwart (NED), Matan Schwartz (ISR) |
| 22 March 2023; 20:00 (CET) | Score by quarters: 2–1, 4–1, 3–2, 3–2 | | | Budapest, Hungary; Referees: Michiel Zwart (NED), Matan Schwartz (ISR) |
| 22 March 2023; 20:00 (CET) | three players 3 | Goals | Kopeliadis, Mouratidis 3 | Budapest, Hungary; Referees: Michiel Zwart (NED), Matan Schwartz (ISR) |

| 22 March 2023; 19:00 (CET) | (Italy) RN Savona | 13–12 | (Italy) Pallanuoto Trieste | Savona, Italy; Referees: Ivan Rakovic (SRB), Radoslaw Koryzna (POL) |
| 22 March 2023; 19:00 (CET) | Score by quarters: 3–2, 2–3, 3–3, 5–4 | | | Savona, Italy; Referees: Ivan Rakovic (SRB), Radoslaw Koryzna (POL) |
| 22 March 2023; 19:00 (CET) | Panerai 4 | Goals | Bini, Valentino 3 | Savona, Italy; Referees: Ivan Rakovic (SRB), Radoslaw Koryzna (POL) |

=== Finals ===
| Team 1 | Agg. | Team 2 | 1st leg | 2nd leg |
|---|---|---|---|---|
| A-Híd Vasas Plaket (Hungary) | 23–15 | (Italy) RN Savona | 8–8 | 15–7 |

==== Leg 1 ====
| 15 April 2023; 19:00 (CET) | (Italy) RN Savona | 8–8 | (Hungary) A-Híd Vasas Plaket | Savona, Italy; Attendance: 1,500; Referees: Jaume Teixido (ESP), Stanko Ivanovski (MNE) |
| 15 April 2023; 19:00 (CET) | Score by quarters: 3–2, 2–3, 2–1, 1–2 | | | Savona, Italy; Attendance: 1,500; Referees: Jaume Teixido (ESP), Stanko Ivanovski (MNE) |
| 15 April 2023; 19:00 (CET) | three players 2 | Goals | Batori 3 | Savona, Italy; Attendance: 1,500; Referees: Jaume Teixido (ESP), Stanko Ivanovski (MNE) |

==== Leg 2 ====
| 20 April 2023; 18:00 (CET) | A-Híd Vasas Plaket (Hungary) | 15–7 | (Italy) RN Savona | Budapest, Hungary; Attendance: 2,000; Referees: Nenad Peris (CRO), Spyridon Achladiotis (GRE) |
| 20 April 2023; 18:00 (CET) | Score by quarters: 5–1, 3–3, 4–0, 3–3 | | | Budapest, Hungary; Attendance: 2,000; Referees: Nenad Peris (CRO), Spyridon Achladiotis (GRE) |
| 20 April 2023; 18:00 (CET) | Randelovic 4 | Goals | Bruni 2 | Budapest, Hungary; Attendance: 2,000; Referees: Nenad Peris (CRO), Spyridon Achladiotis (GRE) |

== See also ==
- 2022–23 LEN Champions League
- 2022–23 LEN Challenger Cup
- 2022–23 Women's Champions League
- 2022–23 Women's LEN Euro Cup
- 2022 LEN Super Cup
- 2022 Women's LEN Super Cup
