= 2022 LEN Super Cup =

Water polo match

Tournament details
- Arena: Sabadell , Spain
- Dates: 19 November 2022

Final positions
- Champions: (Italy) Pro Recco
- Runners-up: (Spain) CN Sabadell

The 2022 LEN Super Cup was the 40th edition of the annual trophy organised by LEN and contested by the reigning champions of the two European competitions for men's water polo clubs. The match was played between European champions Pro Recco (winners of the 2021–22 LEN Champions League) and CN Sabadell (winners of the 2021–22 LEN Euro Cup). The match was held in Sabadell, Spain, on 19 November 2022.

Pro Recco contested the match for the second consecutive year. The Italian side won its second consecutive Super Cup, the eighth in total, beating CN Sabadell 16–8. Pro Recco became the first club to defend the prestigious trophy twice.

== Teams ==
| Team | Qualification | Previous participation (bold indicates winners) |
|---|---|---|
| (Italy) Pro Recco | Winners of the 2021–22 LEN Champions League | 1984, **2003**, **2007**, **2008**, **2010**, **2012**, **2015**, **2021** |
| (Spain) CN Sabadell | Winners of the 2021–22 LEN Euro Cup | Debut |

== Final ==
| 18 October 2022; 20:00 (UTC+2) | **Pro Recco** (Italy) | **16**–8 | (Spain) CN Sabadell | Sabadell, Spain; Referees: Stavridis (GRE), Ohme (GER) |
| 18 October 2022; 20:00 (UTC+2) | Score by quarters: **3**–1, 4–4, **5**–0, **4**–3 | | | Sabadell, Spain; Referees: Stavridis (GRE), Ohme (GER) |
| 18 October 2022; 20:00 (UTC+2) | Di Fulvio 4 | **Goals** | Sanahuja, Averka 2 | Sabadell, Spain; Referees: Stavridis (GRE), Ohme (GER) |

== See also ==
- 2022–23 LEN Champions League
- 2022–23 LEN Euro Cup
- 2022–23 LEN Challenger Cup
- 2022–23 LEN Champions League Women
- 2022–23 Women's LEN Euro Cup
- 2022 Women's LEN Super Cup
