= 2022 Women's LEN Super Cup =

Water polo match

Tournament details
- Arena: Piraeus , Greece
- Dates: 17 December 2022

Final positions
- Champions: (Greece) Olympiacos Piraeus
- Runners-up: (Greece) Ethnikos Piraeus

The 2022 Women's LEN Super Cup was the 16th edition of the annual trophy organised by LEN and contested by the reigning champions of the two European competitions for Women's water polo clubs. The match was an all-Greek derby between European champions Olympiacos Piraeus (winners of the 2021–22 LEN Euro League Women) and Ethnikos Piraeus (winners of the 2021–22 Women's LEN Trophy). The match was held in Piraeus, Greece, on 17 December 2022.

Olympiacos Piraeus contested the match for the second consecutive year. The Greek side won its second consecutive Super Cup, their third in total, beating Ethnikos Piraeus 11–4.

== Teams ==
Team	Qualification	Previous participation (bold indicates winners)
(Greece) Olympiacos Piraeus	Winners of the 2021–22 LEN Euro League Women	2014, **2015**, **2021**
(Greece) Ethnikos Piraeus	Winners of the 2021–22 Women's LEN Trophy	2010

== Final ==
17 December 2022; 17:00	**Olympiacos Piraeus** (Greece)	**11**–4	(Greece) Ethnikos Piraeus	Piraeus, Greece; Referees: Cabanas (ESP), Debreceni (HUN)
17 December 2022; 17:00	Score by quarters: **3**–1, **2**–1, **2**–1, **4**–1			Piraeus, Greece; Referees: Cabanas (ESP), Debreceni (HUN)
17 December 2022; 17:00	Christmas, Eleftheriadou 2	**Goals**	Benekou, Kanetidou 2	Piraeus, Greece; Referees: Cabanas (ESP), Debreceni (HUN)

== See also ==
- 2022–23 LEN Champions League
- 2022–23 LEN Euro Cup
- 2022–23 LEN Challenger Cup
- 2022–23 Women's Champions League
- 2022–23 Women's LEN Euro Cup
- 2022 LEN Super Cup
