= 2022–23 LEN Challenger Cup =

- League: LEN Challenger Cup
- Sport: Water Polo
- Duration: 11 November 2022 – 29 April 2023
- Games: 35
- Teams: 15 (from 11 countries)
- Finals champions: (Greece) GS Apollon Smyrnis (1st title)
- Runners-up: (Spain) CN Terrassa

LEN Challenger Cup seasons
- 2023–24

The 2022–23 LEN Challenger Cup was the inaugural edition of a water polo competition organised by the Ligue Européenne de Natation (LEN). It acts as the third tier, below the LEN Champions League and the LEN Euro Cup. GS Apollon Smyrnis of Greece became the first champions, defeating CN Terrassa of Spain in the final.

== Creation ==
In June 2022, LEN announced the introduction of the LEN Challenger Cup. This tournament was designed to help developing countries and club grow and play more European club games.

== Format ==
Fifteen teams, who had been eliminated from the Champions League and Euro Cup, were divided into three groups of four and one group of three. The groups were held in one country. At the end of the group stage, the top two teams advanced to the Knockout Stage. In the Knockout Stage, the ties were played in a home and away format.

== Composition of teams ==
(CL: Eliminated in Champions League; EC: Eliminated in Euro Cup).

Participating teams
(Bosnia and Herzegovina) VK Banja Luka (CL)	(Bosnia and Herzegovina) VK Invictum Sarajevo (CL)	(Denmark) SK KVIK Kastrup (CL)	(Germany) SV Ludwigsburg 08 (EC)
(Greece) GS Apollon Smyrnis (EC)	(Greece) NC Ydraikos (EC)	(Israel) ASA Tel Aviv (CL)	(Netherlands) ZPC Het Ravijn (CL)
(Slovakia) KVP Nováky (CL)	(Slovakia) SKP Košice (EC)	(Slovenia) Triglav Kranj (EC)	(Spain) CN Terrassa (EC)
(Spain) Tenerife Echeyde (EC)	(Turkey) Enka Istanbul (CL)	(Turkey) Galatasaray (CL)	

== Schedule ==
=== Rounds and dates ===
Phase	Round	Round date
Group Stage	Group Stage	11–13 November 2022
Quarter-Finals	First Leg	24–25 January 2023
Quarter-Finals	Second Leg	8–18 February 2023
Semi-Finals	First leg	1 March 2023
Semi-Finals	Second leg	22 March 2023
Final	First Leg	19 April 2023
Final	Second Leg	29 April 2023

== Draw ==
The draw took place on the 26th of October.

== Group Stage ==
=== Group A ===
- 11–13 November 2022, Novaky, Slovakia.

Pos	Team	Pld	W	D	L	GF	GA	GD	Pts	Qualification	(Spain) TEN	(Turkey) GAL	(Greece) YDR	(Slovakia) NOV
1	(Spain) Tenerife Echeyde	3	3	0	0	40	30	+10	9	Knockout Stage	—	15–11	—	—
2	(Turkey) Galatasaray	3	2	0	1	42	30	+12	6	Knockout Stage	—	—	—	—
3	(Greece) NC Ydraikos	3	1	0	2	44	49	−5	3		11–14	15–18	—	—
4	(Slovakia) KVP Nováky (H)	3	0	0	3	33	44	−11	0		9–12	6–13	18–19	—

Source: LEN
(H) Hosts

11 November 2022; 17:00	NC Ydraikos (Greece)	11–14	(Spain) Tenerife Echeyde	Novaky, Slovakia; Referees: Ralf Mueller (GER), Ghislain Dehon (FRA)
11 November 2022; 17:00	Score by quarters: 3–4, 3–4, 2–3, 2–2			Novaky, Slovakia; Referees: Ralf Mueller (GER), Ghislain Dehon (FRA)
11 November 2022; 17:00	Suzuki 3	Goals	Magana 4	Novaky, Slovakia; Referees: Ralf Mueller (GER), Ghislain Dehon (FRA)

11 November 2022; 18:30	KVP Nováky (Slovakia)	6–13	(Turkey) Galatasaray	Novaky, Slovakia; Referees: Lukasz Krol (POL), Blaz Radonjic (SLO)
11 November 2022; 18:30	Score by quarters: 0–1, 1–3, 2–4, 3–5			Novaky, Slovakia; Referees: Lukasz Krol (POL), Blaz Radonjic (SLO)
11 November 2022; 18:30	Tasaj 2	Goals	Destici 5	Novaky, Slovakia; Referees: Lukasz Krol (POL), Blaz Radonjic (SLO)

12 November 2022; 17:00	NC Ydraikos (Greece)	15–18	(Turkey) Galatasaray	Novaky, Slovakia; Referees: Ralf Mueller (GER), Lukasz Krol (POL)
12 November 2022; 17:00	Score by quarters: 4–4, 3–3, 3–8, 5–3			Novaky, Slovakia; Referees: Ralf Mueller (GER), Lukasz Krol (POL)
12 November 2022; 17:00	Rompopoulos 7	Goals	Senemoglu 5	Novaky, Slovakia; Referees: Ralf Mueller (GER), Lukasz Krol (POL)

12 November 2022; 18:30	KVP Nováky (Slovakia)	9–12	(Spain) Tenerife Echeyde	Novaky, Slovakia; Referees: Ghislain Dehon (FRA), Blaz Radonjic (SLO)
12 November 2022; 18:30	Score by quarters: 3–3, 2–1, 3–5, 1–3			Novaky, Slovakia; Referees: Ghislain Dehon (FRA), Blaz Radonjic (SLO)
12 November 2022; 18:30	Bielik 3	Goals	Lifante 4	Novaky, Slovakia; Referees: Ghislain Dehon (FRA), Blaz Radonjic (SLO)

13 November 2022; 09:30	Tenerife Echeyde (Spain)	15–11	(Turkey) Galatasaray	Novaky, Slovakia; Referees: Ralf Mueller (GER), Blaz Radonjic (SLO)
13 November 2022; 09:30	Score by quarters: 2–3, 5–3, 6–3, 2–2			Novaky, Slovakia; Referees: Ralf Mueller (GER), Blaz Radonjic (SLO)
13 November 2022; 09:30	Lifante, Lopez 4	Goals	Destici 4	Novaky, Slovakia; Referees: Ralf Mueller (GER), Blaz Radonjic (SLO)

13 November 2022; 11:00	KVP Nováky (Slovakia)	18–19	(Greece) NC Ydraikos	Novaky, Slovakia; Referees: Lukasz Krol (POL), Ghislain Dehon (FRA)
13 November 2022; 11:00	Score by quarters: 4–5, 3–5, 7–5, 4–4			Novaky, Slovakia; Referees: Lukasz Krol (POL), Ghislain Dehon (FRA)
13 November 2022; 11:00	Zatovic 5	Goals	Rompopoulos 7	Novaky, Slovakia; Referees: Lukasz Krol (POL), Ghislain Dehon (FRA)

=== Group B ===
- 12–13 November 2022, Terrassa, Spain.

Pos	Team	Pld	W	D	L	GF	GA	GD	Pts	Qualification	(Spain) TER	(Netherlands) HET	(Israel) ASA
1	(Spain) CN Terrassa (H)	2	2	0	0	28	17	+11	6	Knockout Stage	—	16–13	12–4
2	(Netherlands) ZPC Het Ravijn	2	1	0	1	26	20	+6	3	Knockout Stage	—	—	—
3	(Israel) ASA Tel Aviv	2	0	0	2	8	26	−18	0		—	4–14	—

Source: LEN
(H) Hosts

12 November 2022; 10:00	CN Terrassa (Spain)	12–4	(Israel) ASA Tel Aviv	Terrassa, Spain; Referees: Karel Dvoracek (CZE), Alexandros Chatzigoulas (GRE)
12 November 2022; 10:00	Score by quarters: 2–0, 4–1, 4–2, 2–1			Terrassa, Spain; Referees: Karel Dvoracek (CZE), Alexandros Chatzigoulas (GRE)
12 November 2022; 10:00	Baches 4	Goals	four players 1	Terrassa, Spain; Referees: Karel Dvoracek (CZE), Alexandros Chatzigoulas (GRE)

12 November 2022; 18:00	CN Terrassa (Spain)	16–13	(Netherlands) ZPC Het Ravijn	Terrassa, Spain; Referees: Robert Prelovsky (SVK), Karel Dvoracek (CZE)
12 November 2022; 18:00	Score by quarters: 6–3, 3–3, 4–3, 3–4			Terrassa, Spain; Referees: Robert Prelovsky (SVK), Karel Dvoracek (CZE)
12 November 2022; 18:00	Baches 5	Goals	Gottmaker 3	Terrassa, Spain; Referees: Robert Prelovsky (SVK), Karel Dvoracek (CZE)

13 November 2022; 10:30	ASA Tel Aviv (Israel)	4–14	(Netherlands) ZPC Het Ravijn	Terrassa, Spain; Referees: Robert Prelovsky (SVK), Alexandros Chatzigoulas (GRE)
13 November 2022; 10:30	Score by quarters: 1–6, 1–4, 1–2, 1–2			Terrassa, Spain; Referees: Robert Prelovsky (SVK), Alexandros Chatzigoulas (GRE)
13 November 2022; 10:30	Schlein 2	Goals	Wouters 5	Terrassa, Spain; Referees: Robert Prelovsky (SVK), Alexandros Chatzigoulas (GRE)

=== Group C ===
- 11–13 November 2022, Sarajevo, Bosnia and Herzegovina.

Pos	Team	Pld	W	D	L	GF	GA	GD	Pts	Qualification	(Turkey) ESK	(Slovakia) KOS	(Bosnia and Herzegovina) SAR	(Bosnia and Herzegovina) BAN
1	(Turkey) Enka Istanbul	3	3	0	0	74	22	+52	9	Knockout Stage	—	22–10	19–6	33–6
2	(Slovakia) SKP Košice	3	2	0	1	59	36	+23	6	Knockout Stage	—	—	21–6	28–8
3	(Bosnia and Herzegovina) VK Invictum Sarajevo (H)	3	1	0	2	29	52	−23	3		—	—	—	17–12
4	(Bosnia and Herzegovina) VK Banja Luka	3	0	0	3	26	78	−52	0		—	—	—	—

Source: LEN
(H) Hosts

11 November 2022; 19:00	VK Invictum Sarajevo (Bosnia and Herzegovina)	17–12	(Bosnia and Herzegovina) VK Banja Luka	Sarajevo, Bosnia and Herzegovina; Referees: Oriol Jaumandreu (ESP), Tomas Kaseta (LTU)
11 November 2022; 19:00	Score by quarters: 7–5, 3–2, 4–3, 3–2			Sarajevo, Bosnia and Herzegovina; Referees: Oriol Jaumandreu (ESP), Tomas Kaseta (LTU)
11 November 2022; 19:00	Hadzic 7	Goals	Djugum, Cosic 3	Sarajevo, Bosnia and Herzegovina; Referees: Oriol Jaumandreu (ESP), Tomas Kaseta (LTU)

11 November 2022; 21:00	Enka Istanbul (Turkey)	22–10	(Slovakia) SKP Košice	Sarajevo, Bosnia and Herzegovina; Referees: Martin Sand Kristensen (DEN), Maxim Gerasimov (GBR)
11 November 2022; 21:00	Score by quarters: 6–2, 6–5, 6–2, 4–1			Sarajevo, Bosnia and Herzegovina; Referees: Martin Sand Kristensen (DEN), Maxim Gerasimov (GBR)
11 November 2022; 21:00	Baskaya, Obradovic 4	Goals	Motyl 4	Sarajevo, Bosnia and Herzegovina; Referees: Martin Sand Kristensen (DEN), Maxim Gerasimov (GBR)

12 November 2022; 18:00	VK Invictum Sarajevo (Bosnia and Herzegovina)	6–19	(Turkey) Enka Istanbul	Sarajevo, Bosnia and Herzegovina; Referees: Maxim Gerasimov (GBR), Tomas Kaseta (LTU)
12 November 2022; 18:00	Score by quarters: 1–7, 0–3, 2–5, 3–4			Sarajevo, Bosnia and Herzegovina; Referees: Maxim Gerasimov (GBR), Tomas Kaseta (LTU)
12 November 2022; 18:00	Hadzic 2	Goals	Alkan, Kaner 4	Sarajevo, Bosnia and Herzegovina; Referees: Maxim Gerasimov (GBR), Tomas Kaseta (LTU)

12 November 2022; 20:00	SKP Košice (Slovakia)	28–8	(Bosnia and Herzegovina) VK Banja Luka	Sarajevo, Bosnia and Herzegovina; Referees: Oriol Jaumandreu (ESP), Martin Sand Kristensen (DEN)
12 November 2022; 20:00	Score by quarters: 7–1, 4–3, 7–1, 10–0			Sarajevo, Bosnia and Herzegovina; Referees: Oriol Jaumandreu (ESP), Martin Sand Kristensen (DEN)
12 November 2022; 20:00	Orem 6	Goals	Ganic 3	Sarajevo, Bosnia and Herzegovina; Referees: Oriol Jaumandreu (ESP), Martin Sand Kristensen (DEN)

13 November 2022; 09:00	Enka Istanbul (Turkey)	33–6	(Bosnia and Herzegovina) VK Banja Luka	Sarajevo, Bosnia and Herzegovina; Referees: Martin Sand Kristensen (DEN), Tomas Kaseta (LTU)
13 November 2022; 09:00	Score by quarters: 9–1, 4–1, 11–2, 9–2			Sarajevo, Bosnia and Herzegovina; Referees: Martin Sand Kristensen (DEN), Tomas Kaseta (LTU)
13 November 2022; 09:00	Albayrak, Duzenli 7	Goals	Kojcinovic, Vujkovic 2	Sarajevo, Bosnia and Herzegovina; Referees: Martin Sand Kristensen (DEN), Tomas Kaseta (LTU)

13 November 2022; 11:00	VK Invictum Sarajevo (Bosnia and Herzegovina)	6–21	(Slovakia) SKP Košice	Sarajevo, Bosnia and Herzegovina; Referees: Oriol Jaumandreu (ESP), Maxim Gerasimov (GBR)
13 November 2022; 11:00	Score by quarters: 4–5, 2–7, 0–5, 0–4			Sarajevo, Bosnia and Herzegovina; Referees: Oriol Jaumandreu (ESP), Maxim Gerasimov (GBR)
13 November 2022; 11:00	Hadzic 2	Goals	Dily, Orem 4	Sarajevo, Bosnia and Herzegovina; Referees: Oriol Jaumandreu (ESP), Maxim Gerasimov (GBR)

=== Group D ===
- 11–13 November 2022, Kranj, Slovenia.

Pos	Team	Pld	W	D	L	GF	GA	GD	Pts	Qualification	(Greece) APO	(Germany) LUD	(Slovenia) KRA	(Denmark) KAS
1	(Greece) GS Apollon Smyrnis	3	3	0	0	68	20	+48	9	Knockout Stage	—	11–10	—	37–4
2	(Germany) SV Ludwigsburg 08	3	2	0	1	41	28	+13	6	Knockout Stage	—	—	—	—
3	(Slovenia) Triglav Kranj (H)	3	1	0	2	30	42	−12	3		6–20	11–13	—	13–9
4	(Denmark) SK KVIK Kastrup	3	0	0	3	19	68	−49	0		—	6–18	—	—

Source: LEN
(H) Hosts

11 November 2022; 18:30	GS Apollon Smyrnis (Greece)	11–10	(Germany) SV Ludwigsburg 08	Kranj, Slovenia; Referees: Robert Horvath (SVK), Eurico Silva (POR)
11 November 2022; 18:30	Score by quarters: 5–2, 2–2, 2–5, 2–1			Kranj, Slovenia; Referees: Robert Horvath (SVK), Eurico Silva (POR)
11 November 2022; 18:30	Hernandez 4	Goals	four players 2	Kranj, Slovenia; Referees: Robert Horvath (SVK), Eurico Silva (POR)

11 November 2022; 20:15	Triglav Kranj (Slovenia)	13–9	(Denmark) SK KVIK Kastrup	Kranj, Slovenia; Referees: Alper Ozerengin (TUR), Sander Ransjean (NED)
11 November 2022; 20:15	Score by quarters: 3–1, 3–4, 3–3, 4–1			Kranj, Slovenia; Referees: Alper Ozerengin (TUR), Sander Ransjean (NED)
11 November 2022; 20:15	Troppan 5	Goals	Koska 5	Kranj, Slovenia; Referees: Alper Ozerengin (TUR), Sander Ransjean (NED)

12 November 2022; 18:00	GS Apollon Smyrnis (Greece)	37–4	(Denmark) SK KVIK Kastrup	Kranj, Slovenia; Referees: Eurico Silva (POR), Sander Ransjean (NED)
12 November 2022; 18:00	Score by quarters: 8–1, 11–2, 9–2, 9–0			Kranj, Slovenia; Referees: Eurico Silva (POR), Sander Ransjean (NED)
12 November 2022; 18:00	Myrilos 9	Goals	Koska 2	Kranj, Slovenia; Referees: Eurico Silva (POR), Sander Ransjean (NED)

12 November 2022; 20:15	Triglav Kranj (Slovenia)	11–13	(Germany) SV Ludwigsburg 08	Kranj, Slovenia; Referees: Alper Ozerengin (TUR), Robert Horvath (SVK)
12 November 2022; 20:15	Score by quarters: 3–2, 0–5, 4–1, 4–5			Kranj, Slovenia; Referees: Alper Ozerengin (TUR), Robert Horvath (SVK)
12 November 2022; 20:15	Justin 4	Goals	Hernandez 4	Kranj, Slovenia; Referees: Alper Ozerengin (TUR), Robert Horvath (SVK)

13 November 2022; 10:00	SK KVIK Kastrup (Denmark)	6–18	(Germany) SV Ludwigsburg 08	Kranj, Slovenia; Referees: Eurico Silva (POR), Alper Ozerengin (TUR)
13 November 2022; 10:00	Score by quarters: 1–5, 2–2, 2–4, 2–7			Kranj, Slovenia; Referees: Eurico Silva (POR), Alper Ozerengin (TUR)
13 November 2022; 10:00	Lange 4	Goals	Andelic, Dzaja 3	Kranj, Slovenia; Referees: Eurico Silva (POR), Alper Ozerengin (TUR)

13 November 2022; 11:45	Triglav Kranj (Slovenia)	6–20	(Greece) GS Apollon Smyrnis	Kranj, Slovenia; Referees: Robert Horvath (SVK), Sander Ransjean (NED)
13 November 2022; 11:45	Score by quarters: 5–4, 1–5, 0–5, 0–6			Kranj, Slovenia; Referees: Robert Horvath (SVK), Sander Ransjean (NED)
13 November 2022; 11:45	Justin, Lah 2	Goals	Bogdanovic, Goniotakis Korderas 4	Kranj, Slovenia; Referees: Robert Horvath (SVK), Sander Ransjean (NED)

== Knockout Stage ==
The draw for the Knockout Stage was made on the 20 November 2022.

=== Bracket ===
Quarter-finals
(Spain) Tenerife Echeyde	22	13	35
(Slovakia) SKP Košice	8	8	16
(Greece) GS Apollon Smyrnis	9	16	25
(Turkey) Galatasaray	5	8	13
(Spain) CN Terrassa	16	15	31
(Germany) Ludwigsburg 08	7	12	19
(Turkey) Enka Istanbul	14	15	29
(Netherlands) ZPC Het Ravijn	8	16	24

Semi-finals
(Spain) Tenerife Echeyde	11	8	19
(Greece) GS Apollon Smyrnis	10	18	28
(Spain) CN Terrassa	15	12	27
(Turkey) Enka Istanbul	12	8	20

Final
(Greece) GS Apollon Smyrnis	12	18	30
(Spain) CN Terrassa	11	14	25

=== Quarter-Finals ===
25 January 2023; 20:15	Tenerife Echeyde (Spain)	22–8	(Slovakia) SKP Košice	Tenerife, Spain; Referees: Erkan Turkkan (TUR), Philip Uhlig (GER)
25 January 2023; 20:15	Score by quarters: 4–1, 8–1, 3–2, 7–4			Tenerife, Spain; Referees: Erkan Turkkan (TUR), Philip Uhlig (GER)
25 January 2023; 20:15	Lifante 7	Goals	three players 2	Tenerife, Spain; Referees: Erkan Turkkan (TUR), Philip Uhlig (GER)

8 February 2023; 20:00	SKP Košice (Slovakia)	8–13	(Spain) Tenerife Echeyde	Košice, Slovakia; Referees: Spyridon Achladiotis (GRE), Tomi Kavcic (SLO)
8 February 2023; 20:00	Score by quarters: 0–2, 3–3, 2–5, 4–3			Košice, Slovakia; Referees: Spyridon Achladiotis (GRE), Tomi Kavcic (SLO)
8 February 2023; 20:00	Haluska, Muzhychuk 3	Goals	Lopez 5	Košice, Slovakia; Referees: Spyridon Achladiotis (GRE), Tomi Kavcic (SLO)

Tenerife Echeyde won 35–16 on aggregate

25 January 2023; 20:00	GS Apollon Smyrnis (Greece)	9–5	(Turkey) Galatasaray	Athens, Greece; Referees: Sander Ransjean (NED), Vuk Milovic (SRB)
25 January 2023; 20:00	Score by quarters: 3–0, 2–1, 3–4, 1–0			Athens, Greece; Referees: Sander Ransjean (NED), Vuk Milovic (SRB)
25 January 2023; 20:00	Gardikas 3	Goals	Colak, Destici 2	Athens, Greece; Referees: Sander Ransjean (NED), Vuk Milovic (SRB)

18 February 2023; 20:15	Galatasaray (Turkey)	8–16	(Greece) GS Apollon Smyrnis	Istanbul, Turkey; Referees: Mihai George Balanescu (ROU), Boris Obradovic (MNE)
18 February 2023; 20:15	Score by quarters: 1–4, 2–2, 1–5, 4–5			Istanbul, Turkey; Referees: Mihai George Balanescu (ROU), Boris Obradovic (MNE)
18 February 2023; 20:15	Acar 3	Goals	Bogdanovic 4	Istanbul, Turkey; Referees: Mihai George Balanescu (ROU), Boris Obradovic (MNE)

GS Apollon Smyrnis won 25–13 on aggregate

24 January 2023; 19:30	SV Ludwigsburg 08 (Germany)	7–16	(Spain) CN Terrassa	Ludwigsburg, Germany
24 January 2023; 19:30	Score by quarters: 2–4, 2–3, 1–4, 2–5			Ludwigsburg, Germany
24 January 2023; 19:30	Bauer 3	Goals	Alarcon Tevar 4	Ludwigsburg, Germany

8 February 2023; 20:00	CN Terrassa (Spain)	15–12	(Germany) SV Ludwigsburg 08	Terrassa, Spain; Referees: Haldun Toygarli (TUR), Rajmund Fodor (HUN)
8 February 2023; 20:00	Score by quarters: 3–3, 4–3, 6–3, 2–3			Terrassa, Spain; Referees: Haldun Toygarli (TUR), Rajmund Fodor (HUN)
8 February 2023; 20:00	Baches, Martinez 4	Goals	Blazevic, Hernandez 3	Terrassa, Spain; Referees: Haldun Toygarli (TUR), Rajmund Fodor (HUN)

CN Terrassa won 31–19 on aggregate

25 January 2023; 18:30	Enka Istanbul (Turkey)	14–8	(Netherlands) ZPC Het Ravijn	Istanbul, Turkey; Referees: Julien Bourges (FRA), Levan Berishvili (GEO)
25 January 2023; 18:30	Score by quarters: 3–0, 4–4, 2–2, 5–2			Istanbul, Turkey; Referees: Julien Bourges (FRA), Levan Berishvili (GEO)
25 January 2023; 18:30	Obradovic 6	Goals	Muller, Wouters 3	Istanbul, Turkey; Referees: Julien Bourges (FRA), Levan Berishvili (GEO)

8 February 2023; 18:00	ZPC Het Ravijn (Netherlands)	16–15	(Turkey) Enka Istanbul	Het Ravijn, Netherlands; Referees: Luca Castagnola (ITA), Alex Marquez (ESP)
8 February 2023; 18:00	Score by quarters: 5–3, 3–4, 3–3, 5–5			Het Ravijn, Netherlands; Referees: Luca Castagnola (ITA), Alex Marquez (ESP)
8 February 2023; 18:00	Loos 6	Goals	Obradovic 5	Het Ravijn, Netherlands; Referees: Luca Castagnola (ITA), Alex Marquez (ESP)

Enka Istanbul won 29–24 on aggregate

=== Semi-Finals ===
1 March 2023; 20:15	Tenerife Echeyde (Spain)	11–10	(Greece) GS Apollon Smyrnis	Tenerife, Spain; Referees: Daniele Bianco (ITA), Hajmund Fodor (HUN)
1 March 2023; 20:15	Score by quarters: 1–3, 3–1, 4–3, 3–3			Tenerife, Spain; Referees: Daniele Bianco (ITA), Hajmund Fodor (HUN)
1 March 2023; 20:15	Lifante, Lopez 4	Goals	Gardikas 5	Tenerife, Spain; Referees: Daniele Bianco (ITA), Hajmund Fodor (HUN)

22 March 2023; 20:00	GS Apollon Smyrnis (Greece)	18–8	(Spain) Tenerife Echeyde	Athens, Greece; Referees: Peter de Jong (NED), Veselin Miskovic (MNE)
22 March 2023; 20:00	Score by quarters: 6–1, 3–3, 5–2, 4–2			Athens, Greece; Referees: Peter de Jong (NED), Veselin Miskovic (MNE)
22 March 2023; 20:00	Bogdanovic, Gardikas 4	Goals	Magana 3	Athens, Greece; Referees: Peter de Jong (NED), Veselin Miskovic (MNE)

GS Apollon Smyrnis won 28–19 on aggregate

1 March 2023; 20:00	CN Terrassa (Spain)	15–12	(Turkey) Enka Istanbul	Terrassa, Spain; Referees: Andreja Stanojevic (SRB), Gernot Haentschel (GER)
1 March 2023; 20:00	Score by quarters: 5–1, 4–6, 2–3, 4–2			Terrassa, Spain; Referees: Andreja Stanojevic (SRB), Gernot Haentschel (GER)
1 March 2023; 20:00	Fernandez 5	Goals	Ozbek 3	Terrassa, Spain; Referees: Andreja Stanojevic (SRB), Gernot Haentschel (GER)

22 March 2023; 18:30	Enka Istanbul (Turkey)	8–10	(Spain) CN Terrassa	Istanbul, Turkey; Referees: Gabor Vogel (HUN), Julien Bourges (FRA)
22 March 2023; 18:30	Score by quarters: 2–3, 2–2, 3–3, 1–2			Istanbul, Turkey; Referees: Gabor Vogel (HUN), Julien Bourges (FRA)
22 March 2023; 18:30	Obradovic, Ozbek 3	Goals	Fernandez 5	Istanbul, Turkey; Referees: Gabor Vogel (HUN), Julien Bourges (FRA)

CN Terrassa won 25–20 on aggregate

=== Final ===
19 April 2023; 19:45	GS Apollon Smyrnis (Greece)	12–11	(Spain) CN Terrassa	Athens, Greece; Referees: Tamas Kovacs-Csatlos (HUN), Julien Bourges (FRA)
19 April 2023; 19:45	Score by quarters: 3–2, 3–4, 4–2, 2–3			Athens, Greece; Referees: Tamas Kovacs-Csatlos (HUN), Julien Bourges (FRA)
19 April 2023; 19:45	Bogdanovic, Gardikas 4	Goals	Fernandez, Tevar 3	Athens, Greece; Referees: Tamas Kovacs-Csatlos (HUN), Julien Bourges (FRA)

29 April 2023; 18:00	CN Terrassa (Spain)	14–18	(Greece) GS Apollon Smyrnis	Terrassa, Spain; Referees: Raffaele Colombo (ITA), Andreja Stanojevic (SRB)
29 April 2023; 18:00	Score by quarters: 3–4, 4–4, 4–7, 3–3			Terrassa, Spain; Referees: Raffaele Colombo (ITA), Andreja Stanojevic (SRB)
29 April 2023; 18:00	Baches 4	Goals	Vickovic 5	Terrassa, Spain; Referees: Raffaele Colombo (ITA), Andreja Stanojevic (SRB)

GS Apollon Smyrnis won 30–25 on aggregate

2022–23 LEN Challenger Cup Champions
(Greece)
GS Apollon Smyrnis
1st title

== See also ==
- 2022–23 LEN Champions League
- 2022–23 LEN Euro Cup
- 2022–23 Women's Champions League
- 2022–23 Women's LEN Euro Cup
- 2022 LEN Super Cup
- 2022 Women's LEN Super Cup
