= CSM Oradea =

Romanian sports society

- Full name: Clubul Sportiv Municipal Oradea
- Nicknames: Leii Roşii (Red Lions)
- Founded: 2003; 23 years ago
- Colours: Red, Blue, White
- Chairman: Șerban Sere
- Head coach: Cristian Achim
- Club titles: 2016 & 2018
- Website: Official website

CSM Oradea is a Romanian sports society from Oradea, Romania, founded in 2003.

== Men's handball section ==
The men's handball was the first sports section of Oradea Municipal Sports Club and was established in 2003.

The handball team debuted in the country's 2nd tier, but gained promotion to the elite tier, where it played for one season. CSM Oradea was relegated back to the 2nd league, where it had many highly successful seasons, in which it dominated the competition.

CSM Oradea won Romania's 2nd handball division in 2014, 2015, 2017 and 2018. Also, in 2020, it won the group it was part of, qualifying for the semi-final tournament, but did not appear. Each time, due to financial reasons and the lack of interest of private financiers, the men's handball section could not take the step to the National League, but continued its activity in Division A (the 2nd echelon of the country).

== Men's Basketball section ==
During the last few years, CSM Oradea became one of the most powerful teams in Romanian basketball. The Red Lions have won the championship three times, and have played several other finals. In the 2016/17 season, they played in the Basketball Champions League group stages and the FIBA Europe Cup quarter-finals.
