= 2022–23 LEN Champions League =

Water polo sports season

- League: LEN Champions League
- Sport: Water Polo
- Duration: 29 September 2022 – 3 June 2023
- Season MVP: (Hungary) Gergő Zalánki (Pro Recco)
- Top scorer: (Spain) Alvaro Granados 46 goals (Novi Beograd)

Final 8
- Champions: (Italy) Pro Recco (11th title)
- Runners-up: (Serbia) Novi Beograd
- Finals MVP: (Hungary) Gergő Zalánki (Pro Recco)

Champions League seasons
- ← 2021–22 2023–24 →

The 2022–23 LEN Champions League was the 60th edition of LEN's premier competition for men's water polo clubs. The champions were Pro Recco of Italy, who defeated Novi Beograd of Serbia 14–11 in the Final in Belgrade.

== Qualified teams ==
The full list of teams qualified for each stage of the 2022–23 EHF European League was announced on 12 July 2022.

Group stage
(Croatia) Jug AO Dubrovnik	(France) CN Marseille	(Georgia (country)) Dinamo Tbilisi	(Germany) Waspo'98 Hannover
(Germany) Spandau 04 Berlin	(Greece) Olympiacos Piraeus	(Hungary) FTC-Telekom Budapest	(Italy) Pro Recco ^{CL}
(Serbia) Novi Beograd	(Serbia) Radnički Kragujevac	(Spain) Zodiac Atlètic-Barceloneta	(Spain) Astrapool Sabadell

Qualification round II
(Croatia) Jadran Split	(France) CN Noisy-le-Sec	(Germany) ASC Duisburg	(Greece) NC Vouliagmeni
(Hungary) Genesys OSC-Budapest	(Italy) AN Brescia	(Serbia) Šabac	(Spain) Barcelona

Qualification round I
(Bosnia and Herzegovina) Invictum Sarajevo	(Bosnia and Herzegovina) Banja Luka	(Croatia) HAVK Mladost Zagreb	(Denmark) KVIK Kastrup
(France) EN Tourcoing	(Greece) Panionios GSS	(Hungary) A-Híd VasasPlaket	(Israel) ASA Tel Aviv
(Italy) RN Savona	(Lithuania) EVK Žaibas	(Montenegro) Jadran Herceg Novi	(Montenegro) Primorac Kotor
(Netherlands) ZPC Het Ravijn	(Portugal) Vitória Sport Clube	(Romania) Steaua Bucharest	(Romania) CSM Oradea
(Slovakia) KVP Nováky	(Turkey) Galatasaray	(Turkey) Enka Istanbul	

== Schedule ==
The schedule of the competition is as follows.

Phase	Round	1st leg	2nd leg
Qualifying rounds	Qualification round I	29 September–2 October 2022	
Qualifying rounds	Qualification round II	14–16 October 2022	
Qualifying rounds	Qualification round III	29 October 2022	5 November 2022
Preliminary round	Round 1	15/16 November 2022	
Preliminary round	Round 2	29/30 November 2022	
Preliminary round	Round 3	13/14 December 2022	
Preliminary round	Round 4	20/21 December 2022	
Preliminary round	Round 5	10/11 January 2023	
Preliminary round	Round 6	24/25 January 2023	
Preliminary round	Round 7	7/8 February 2023	
Preliminary round	Round 8	17/18 February 2023	
Preliminary round	Round 9	28 February/1 March 2023	
Preliminary round	Round 10	21/22 March 2023	
Preliminary round	Round 11	4/5 April 2023	
Preliminary round	Round 12	25/26 April 2023	
Preliminary round	Round 13	12/13 May 2023	
Preliminary round	Round 14	23/24 May 2023	
Final 8	Quarterfinals	31 May 2023	
Final 8	Semifinals	1 June 2023	
Final 8	Final	3 June 2023	

== Qualifying rounds ==
=== Qualification round I ===
The draw took place in Split. The top three ranked sides will advance from both groups.

==== Group A ====
- 29 September–2 October 2022, Nijverdal, Netherlands.

Pos	Team	Pld	W	D	L	GF	GA	GD	Pts	Qualification	(Hungary) VAS	(Montenegro) PRI	(Romania) STE	(Netherlands) HET	(Bosnia and Herzegovina) SAR
1	(Hungary) A-Híd VasasPlaket	4	4	0	0	75	21	+54	12	Qualification round II	—	13–10	—	—	37–2
2	(Montenegro) Primorac Kotor	4	3	0	1	76	35	+41	9	Qualification round II	—	—	14–11	—	36–4
3	(Romania) Steaua Bucharest	4	2	0	2	58	35	+23	6	Qualification round II	3–10	—	—	—	29–2
4	(Netherlands) ZPC Het Ravijn	4	1	0	3	53	49	+4	3		6–15	7–16	10–15	—	31–3
5	(Bosnia and Herzegovina) Invictum Sarajevo	4	0	0	4	11	133	−122	0		—	—	—	—	—

Source: LEN

==== Group B ====
- 30 September–2 October 2022, Oradea, Romania.

Pos	Team	Pld	W	D	L	GF	GA	GD	Pts	Qualification	(Romania) ORA	(Italy) RNS	(Turkey) GAL	(Israel) ASA
1	(Romania) CSM Oradea	3	3	0	0	34	18	+16	9	Qualification round II	—	10–7	—	12–3
2	(Italy) RN Savona	3	2	0	1	41	24	+17	6	Qualification round II	—	—	10–6	—
3	(Turkey) Galatasaray	3	1	0	2	29	25	+4	3	Qualification round II	8–12	—	—	15–3
4	(Israel) ASA Tel Aviv	3	0	0	3	14	51	−37	0		—	8–24	—	—

Source: LEN

==== Group C ====
- 29 September–2 October 2022, Herceg Novi, Montenegro.

Pos	Team	Pld	W	D	L	GF	GA	GD	Pts	Qualification	(Croatia) MLA	(Montenegro) JHN	(Lithuania) ŽAI	(Turkey) ESK	(Slovakia) NOV
1	(Croatia) HAVK Mladost Zagreb	4	4	0	0	56	23	+33	12	Qualification round II	—	—	—	16–6	16–3
2	(Montenegro) Jadran Herceg Novi	4	3	0	1	54	27	+27	9	Qualification round II	7–9	—	12–2	19–8	16–8
3	(Lithuania) EVK Žaibas	4	2	0	2	36	42	−6	6	Qualification round II	7–15	—	—	—	14–6
4	(Turkey) Enka Istanbul	4	0	1	3	34	59	−25	1		—	—	9–13	—	—
5	(Slovakia) KVP Nováky	4	0	1	3	28	57	−29	1		—	—	—	11–11	—

Source: LEN

==== Group D ====
- 29 September–2 October 2022, Tourcoing, France.

Pos	Team	Pld	W	D	L	GF	GA	GD	Pts	Qualification	(France) ENT	(Greece) PAN	(Portugal) VIT	(Denmark) KAS	(Bosnia and Herzegovina) BAN
1	(France) EN Tourcoing	4	4	0	0	108	16	+92	12	Qualification round II	—	10–5	28–5	29–4	41–2
2	(Greece) Panionios GSS	4	3	0	1	102	20	+82	9	Qualification round II	—	—	21–6	34–2	—
3	(Portugal) Vitória Sport Clube	4	2	0	2	51	64	−13	6	Qualification round II	—	—	—	—	—
4	(Denmark) KVIK Kastrup	4	1	0	3	35	82	−47	3		—	—	6–11	—	23–8
5	(Bosnia and Herzegovina) Banja Luka	4	0	0	4	21	135	−114	0		—	2–42	9–29	—	—

Source: LEN

=== Qualification round II ===
The top two ranked sides from each group advance.

==== Group A ====
- 13–16 October 2022, Split, Croatia.

Pos	Team	Pld	W	D	L	GF	GA	GD	Pts	Qualification	(Croatia) JST	(Hungary) VSC	(Italy) RNS	(Serbia) ŠAB	(Romania) STE
1	(Croatia) Jadran Split	4	4	0	0	57	36	+21	12	Round III	—	13–11	—	14–13	—
2	(Hungary) A-Híd VasasPlaket	4	3	0	1	51	38	+13	9	Round III	—	—	9–8	—	—
3	(Italy) RN Savona	4	2	0	2	38	35	+3	6		5–13	—	—	10–8	—
4	(Serbia) Šabac	4	1	0	3	42	47	−5	3		—	4–13	—	—	17–10
5	(Romania) Steaua Bucharest	4	0	0	4	35	67	−32	0		7–17	13–18	5–15	—	—

Source: LEN

==== Group B ====
- 13–16 October 2022, Barcelona, Spain.

Pos	Team	Pld	W	D	L	GF	GA	GD	Pts	Qualification	(France) CER	(Romania) ORA	(Montenegro) JHN	(Spain) CNB	(Portugal) VIT
1	(France) CN Noisy-le-Sec	4	4	0	0	58	36	+22	12	Round III	—	—	14–12	—	17–4
2	(Romania) CSM Oradea	4	2	0	2	48	31	+17	6	Round III	7–11	—	—	—	—
3	(Montenegro) Jadran Herceg Novi	4	2	0	2	56	42	+14	6		—	9–8	—	—	23–7
4	(Spain) Barcelona	4	2	0	2	54	46	+8	6		13–16	6–12	13–12	—	22–6
5	(Portugal) Vitória Sport Clube	4	0	0	4	22	83	−61	0		—	5–21	—	—	—

Source: LEN

==== Group C ====
- 14–16 October 2022, Kotor, Montenegro.

Pos	Team	Pld	W	D	L	GF	GA	GD	Pts	Qualification	(Hungary) OSC	(Greece) NCV	(France) ENT	(Montenegro) PRI
1	(Hungary) Genesys OSC-Budapest	3	2	0	1	34	27	+7	6	Round III	—	—	7–10	—
2	(Greece) NC Vouliagmeni	3	2	0	1	38	28	+10	6	Round III	9–13	—	—	—
3	(France) EN Tourcoing	3	1	1	1	33	31	+2	4		—	13–14	—	—
4	(Montenegro) Primorac Kotor	3	0	1	2	20	39	−19	1		8–14	2–15	10–10	—

Source: LEN

==== Group D ====
- 13–16 October 2022, Athens, Greece.

Pos	Team	Pld	W	D	L	GF	GA	GD	Pts	Qualification	(Italy) BRE	(Greece) PAN	(Croatia) MLA	(Lithuania) ŽAI	(Germany) DUI
1	(Italy) AN Brescia	4	4	0	0	65	23	+42	12	Round III	—	—	—	—	—
2	(Greece) Panionios GSS	4	3	0	1	41	32	+9	9	Round III	4–9	—	7–6	—	14–8
3	(Croatia) HAVK Mladost Zagreb	4	2	0	2	45	37	+8	6		9–13	—	—	—	—
4	(Lithuania) EVK Žaibas	4	1	0	3	40	70	−30	3		4–25	9–16	10–14	—	17–15
5	(Germany) ASC Duisburg	4	0	0	4	36	65	−29	0		6–18	—	7–16	—	—

Source: LEN

=== Qualification round III ===
The winners in the third round will continue in the preliminary round.

Team 1	Agg.	Team 2	1st leg	2nd leg
Genesys OSC-Budapest (Hungary)	29–18	(Greece) Panionios GSS	17–7	12–11
CN Noisy-le-Sec (France)	23–26	(Greece) NC Vouliagmeni	11–17	12–9
A-Híd VasasPlaket (Hungary)	18–23	(Italy) AN Brescia	10–12	8–11
Jadran Split (Croatia)	21–14	(Romania) CSM Oradea	9–3	12–11

== Preliminary round ==
Location of teams of the 2022–23 LEN Champions League preliminary round.

In the regular season, teams will play against each other home and away in a round-robin format. The top four teams in group A and the top three teams in Group B will advance to the Final 8. Also, Novi Beograd will participate in the Final 8 as the host of the tournament. The matchdays will be from 15 November 2022 to 24 May 2023.

Key to colors
Advance to the Final 8	Home team win	Tie	Away team win

=== Group A ===
Pos	Team	Pld	W	D	L	GF	GA	GD	Pts	Qualification	(Spain) BAR	(Italy) REC	(Greece) OLY	(Greece) NCV	(Croatia) JST	(Serbia) RKG	(Georgia (country)) DTB	(Germany) HAN
1	(Spain) Zodiac Atlètic-Barceloneta	14	13	0	1	169	100	+69	39	Final 8	—	5–11	10–5	13–6	8–6	18–9	13–6	20–5
2	(Italy) Pro Recco	14	12	0	2	192	102	+90	36	Final 8	8–9	—	10–9	14–7	14–7	21–12	20–5	21–4
3	(Greece) Olympiacos Piraeus	14	10	1	3	175	114	+61	31	Final 8	7–9	9–7	—	14–6	10–7	13–7	19–10	15–8
4	(Greece) NC Vouliagmeni	14	5	2	7	130	156	−26	17	Final 8	7–11	7–13	6–14	—	13–12	9–10	12–7	10–9
5	(Croatia) Jadran Split	14	5	2	7	142	141	+1	17		5–9	9–13	8–13	10–10	—	10–10	21–7	12–8
6	(Serbia) Radnički Kragujevac	14	4	3	7	140	175	−35	15		10–14	8–16	10–10	9–9	11–13	—	11–10	13–12
7	(Georgia (country)) Dinamo Tbilisi	14	2	0	12	115	200	−85	6		8–14	3–13	9–21	9–14	7–12	13–8	—	11–14
8	(Germany) Waspo'98 Hannover	14	1	0	13	116	191	−75	3		7–16	8–11	7–16	11–14	8–10	7–12	8–10	—

Source: LEN

=== Group B ===
Pos	Team	Pld	W	D	L	GF	GA	GD	Pts	Qualification	(Italy) BRE	(Serbia) NBG	(Hungary) FTC	(Croatia) JUG	(Spain) SAB	(Hungary) OSC	(France) CNM	(Germany) S04
1	(Italy) AN Brescia	14	11	1	2	169	124	+45	34	Final 8	—	12–9	8–4	14–10	7–4	14–6	15–13	14–10
2	(Serbia) Novi Beograd (Note: Novi Beograd is already qualified as the Final 8 host.)	14	10	2	2	178	136	+42	32	Final 8	11–9	—	14–13	12–12	16–11	17–9	11–4	13–8
3	(Hungary) FTC-Telekom Budapest	14	8	1	5	148	141	+7	25	Final 8	10–6	14–12	—	9–7	10–12	12–11	9–8	12–8
4	(Croatia) Jug AO Dubrovnik	14	4	4	6	156	161	−5	16	Final 8	8–13	11–11	12–12	—	14–10	13–8	14–9	11–13
5	(Spain) Astrapool Sabadell	14	5	1	8	131	147	−16	16		10–14	6–8	7–10	15–12	—	9–8	13–11	9–9
6	(Hungary) Genesys OSC-Budapest	14	3	4	7	143	162	−19	13		14–14	9–11	12–16	9–9	9–8	—	18–13	9–9
7	(France) CN Marseille	14	4	1	9	146	162	−16	13		5–13	13–17	13–7	15–11	9–6	10–10	—	14–7
8	(Germany) Spandau 04 Berlin	14	3	2	9	129	167	−38	11		10–16	5–16	11–10	11–12	10–11	7–11	11–9	—

Source: LEN

== Final 8 ==
31 May–3 June 2023, Belgrade, Serbia.

Location of the 2022–23 LEN Champions League Final 8

=== Qualified teams ===
Group	Winners	Runners-up	Third	Fourth
A	(Spain) Zodiac Atlètic-Barceloneta	(Italy) Pro Recco	(Greece) Olympiacos Piraeus	(Greece) NC Vouliagmeni
B	(Italy) AN Brescia	(Serbia) Novi Beograd	(Hungary) FTC-Telekom Budapest	(Croatia) Jug AO Dubrovnik

=== Bracket ===
Quarterfinals
31 May
(Spain) Zodiac CNAB	11
(Croatia) Jug AO	9
31 May
(Serbia) Novi Beograd	13
(Greece) Olympiacos	11
31 May
(Italy) AN Brescia	10
(Greece) NC Vouliagmeni	11
31 May
(Italy) Pro Recco	8
(Hungary) FTC-Telekom	4

Semifinals
1 June
(Spain) Zodiac CNAB	10
(Serbia) Novi Beograd (PSO)	12
1 June
(Greece) NC Vouliagmeni	8
(Italy) Pro Recco	12

Final
3 June
(Serbia) Novi Beograd	11
(Italy) Pro Recco	14
Third place game
3 June
(Spain) Zodiac CNAB (PSO)	14
(Greece) NC Vouliagmeni	13

5th–8th place bracket

5th–8th place semifinals
1 June
(Croatia) Jug AO	5
(Greece) Olympiacos	14
1 June
(Italy) AN Brescia	8
(Hungary) FTC-Telekom	9

Fifth place game
2 June
(Greece) Olympiacos	9
(Hungary) FTC-Telekom	4
Seventh place game
2 June
(Croatia) Jug AO	14
(Italy) AN Brescia	10

2022–23 LEN Champions League
Champions

Pro Recco
11th title

== Awards ==
Season MVP	Top Scorer	Finals MVP
(Hungary) Gergő Zalánki (Pro Recco)	(Spain) Alvaro Granados (Novi Beograd) [46 goals]	(Hungary) Gergő Zalánki (Pro Recco)

Total 7 of the Season
LW	(Spain) Alvaro Granados (Novi Beograd)	CF	(Greece) Dimitrios Nikolaidis (Vouliagmeni)	RW	(Hungary) Gergő Zalánki (Pro Recco)
LD	(Spain) Felipe Perrone (Atlètic-Barceloneta)	CB	(Croatia) Marko Zuvela (Jug)	RD	(Italy) Edoardo Di Soma (Brescia)
		GK	(Italy) Marco Del Lungo (Pro Recco)		

== See also ==
- 2022–23 LEN Euro Cup
- 2022–23 LEN Challenger Cup
