= ASA Tel Aviv =

Israeli handball team

מועדון כדוריד אס"א תל אביב Handball Club ASA Tel Aviv
- Founded: 1982
- Arena: Tel Aviv University Sports Center
- Capacity: 500
- President: (Israel) Dani Turkenits
- Head coach: (Serbia) Milos Simic
- League: Ligat Winner
- 2022-2023: 8
- Club colours
Home	Away

ASA Tel Aviv (Hebrew: אס"א תל אביב), is a handball club in Tel Aviv, Israel that competes in the Ligat Winner (Israeli premier league). The club was established in 1982. The team won the league championship in 2002 and five state cups (2002, 2005, 2008, 2009, 2010). The club is part of the greater ASA Tel Aviv sports club, which also has tennis, water polo, and women's handball teams.

The team colors are Blue and white, and it hosts home games at Sports Center, Tel Aviv University.

== Titles ==
- Israel Champions (1): 2002
- Israel Cup Holder (5): 2002, 2005, 2008, 2009, 2010

== Notable players ==
- (Israel) Michael (Misha) Levin
- (Israel) Dan Mirkos (Captain)
- (Israel) Ido Lavie
- (Israel) Tom Matalon
- (Israel) Gil Pomerantz
- (Israel) Gil Yaacov
- (Ukraine) Andrei Ternovoi
- (Romania) Viorel Mazilu
- (Croatia) Miro Barisic

== See also ==
- Sports in Israel
