= 2015–16 LEN Champions League squads =

This is a list of the squads with their players that competed at the 2015–16 LEN Champions League.

== CNA Barceloneta ==
| No. | Name | Date of birth | Position | L/R | Height | Weight |
|---|---|---|---|---|---|---|
| 4 | Alberto Munarriz | 19 May 1994 | | B | | |
| 16 | Victor Alegre | 21 January 2000 | | R | | |
| 18 | Alberto Aviles | 21 February 1999 | | R | | |
| 2 | Balázs Szirányi | 10 January 1983 | | B | | |
| 1 | Daniel López | 16 July 1980 | Goalkeeper | B | | |
| 8 | Albert Español | 29 October 1985 | | B | | |
| 12 | Martín Famera | 4 November 1988 | | B | | |
| 17 | Mateus Finizola | 26 January 2000 | | R | | |
| 10 | Francisco Fernández | 21 June 1986 | | B | | |
| 20 | Marcos Higueras | 26 November 1999 | | R | | |
| 5 | Marc Larumbre | 30 May 1994 | | B | | |
| 13 | Miquel Linares | 16 April 1997 | Goalkeeper | B | | |
| 6 | Marc Minguell | 14 January 1985 | | B | | |
| 14 | Nikolas Paul García | 14 June 1999 | | B | | |
| 15 | Sergio Prieto | 27 October 2000 | | R | | |
| 3 | Strahinja Rašović | 9 March 1992 | | B | | |
| 11 | Viktor Rašović | 13 August 1993 | | B | | |
| 7 | Marc Roca | 21 January 1988 | | B | | |
| 19 | Marc Rodríguez | 27 April 2000 | | R | | |
| 9 | Roger Tahull | 11 May 1997 | | B | | |
| 21 | Pol Rubio | 4 September 1998 | | R | | |
| 22 | Salvador Sánchez | 17 November 2000 | | R | | |

== AN Brescia ==
| No. | Name | Date of birth | Position | L/R | Height | Weight |
|---|---|---|---|---|---|---|
| 8 | Alessandro Nora | 24 May 1987 | | B | 191 cm | 88 kg |
| 10 | Zeno Bertoli | 22 December 1988 | | B | | |
| 13 | Brando Dian | 18 January 1991 | Goalkeeper | B | 186 cm | 76 kg |
| 12 | Christian Napolitano | 22 July 1982 | | B | 192 cm | 96 kg |
| 3 | Christian Presciutti | 27 November 1982 | | B | 184 cm | 86 kg |
| 6 | Mattia Cima | 30 January 2001 | | R | | |
| 7 | Luca Damonte | 3 April 1992 | | B | | |
| 8 | Carlo De Iorio | 17 January 1999 | | R | | |
| 1 | Marco Del Lungo | 1 March 1990 | Goalkeeper | B | 190 cm | 93 kg |
| 10 | Vincenzo Dolce | 11 May 1995 | | R | | |
| 5 | Guillermo Molina Rios | 16 March 1984 | | B | 194 cm | 112 kg |
| 9 | Nicholas Presciutti | 14 December 1993 | | B | 190 cm | 90 kg |
| 4 | Sava Ranđelović | 17 July 1993 | | B | | |
| 2 | Stefano Guerrato | 2 October 1997 | | B | | |
| 11 | Nemanja Ubović | 24 February 1991 | | B | | |
| 6 | Valerio Rizzo | 21 September 1984 | | B | 174 cm | 83 kg |
| 17 | Piergiuseppe Zanetti | 11 November 2000 | | R | | |

== VK Budva ==
| No. | Name | Date of birth | Position | L/R | Height | Weight |
|---|---|---|---|---|---|---|
| 10 | Aleksandar Radanović | 6 August 1997 | | B | | |
| 5 | Blažo Mitrović | 1 July 1997 | | B | | |
| 8 | Bogdan Đurđić | 8 August 1996 | | B | | |
| 6 | Savo Ćetković | 4 October 1999 | | B | | |
| 5 | Danilo Dragović | 1 September 1998 | | R | | |
| 12 | Branko Franeta | 4 March 1999 | | B | | |
| 12 | Jovan Franeta | 23 April 1999 | | B | | |
| 8 | Igor Zubac | 23 November 1993 | Goalkeeper | R | | |
| 13 | Miloš Krivokapić | 22 February 1999 | Goalkeeper | B | | |
| 1 | Dejan Lazović | 8 February 1990 | Goalkeeper | B | | |
| 3 | Luka Ćupić | 7 December 1997 | | B | | |
| 2 | Lazar Manojlović | 20 February 1999 | | B | | |
| 13 | Marko Konatar | 22 December 1996 | | R | | |
| 7 | Milorad Radunović | 20 December 1994 | | B | | |
| 13 | Miloš Konatar | 22 December 1996 | Goalkeeper | B | | |
| 16 | Nemanja Nedović | 27 May 1999 | | R | | |
| 11 | Petar Ćetković | | | B | | |
| 18 | Vuk Prodanić | 8 February 1999 | | R | | |
| 19 | Dimitrije Rašković | 19 March 1999 | | R | | |
| 9 | Stefan Kovačević | | | B | | |
| 3 | Nikola Tomanović | | | B | | |
| 4 | Bogdan Vujašević | | | B | | |

== ASC Duisburg ==
| No. | Name | Date of birth | Position | L/R | Height | Weight |
|---|---|---|---|---|---|---|
| 12 | Jan Bakulo | 1 April 1991 | | B | | |
| 13 | Christopher Hans | 9 September 1995 | Goalkeeper | B | | |
| 6 | Daniel Grohs | 27 August 1990 | | B | | |
| 2 | Dennis Eidner | 4 August 1989 | | B | | |
| 5 | Gilbert Schimanski | 20 April 1995 | | R | | |
| 3 | Kristof Hulman | 6 February 1996 | | B | | |
| 5 | Nils Illinger | 15 November 1995 | | B | | |
| 7 | Philipp Kalberg | 6 August 1993 | | B | | |
| 9 | Efstratios Manolakis | 11 September 1998 | | R | | |
| 9 | Manuel Grohs | 16 April 1993 | | B | | |
| 8 | Nick Möller | 3 February 1996 | | B | | |
| 11 | Jan Obschernikat | 15 December 1992 | | B | | |
| 4 | Julian Real | 22 December 1989 | | B | | |
| 1 | Moritz Schenkel | 4 September 1990 | Goalkeeper | B | | |
| 10 | Paul Schüler | 14 June 1987 | | B | | |

== ZF Eger ==
| No. | Name | Date of birth | Position | L/R | Height | Weight |
|---|---|---|---|---|---|---|
| 14 | Dániel Angyal | 29 March 1992 | | B | | |
| 11 | Krisztián Bedő | 4 May 1993 | | B | | |
| 17 | Barnabás Biros | 5 June 1997 | | B | | |
| 3 | Péter Biros | 5 April 1976 | | B | | |
| 16 | Boldizsár Csiszár | 3 March 1997 | | R | | |
| 13 | Kristóf Csoma | 26 January 1992 | Goalkeeper | B | | |
| 4 | Uroš Čučković | 25 April 1990 | | B | | |
| 7 | Miloš Ćuk | 21 December 1990 | | B | | |
| 9 | Balázs Erdélyi | 16 February 1990 | | B | | |
| 12 | Balázs Hárai | 5 April 1987 | | B | | |
| 5 | Norbert Hosnyánszky | 4 March 1984 | | B | | |
| 6 | Bálint Lőrincz | 10 March 1994 | | B | | |
| 18 | Levente Mata | 15 July 1998 | | R | | |
| 1 | Branislav Mitrović | 30 January 1985 | Goalkeeper | B | | |
| 15 | Gábor Szalai | 29 November 1997 | | R | | |
| 8 | István Márton Szivós | 16 August 1981 | | B | | |
| 10 | Boris Vapenski | 9 October 1990 | | B | | |
| 2 | Gergő Zalánki | 26 February 1995 | | B | | |

== Galatasaray ==
| No. | Name | Date of birth | Position | L/R | Height | Weight |
|---|---|---|---|---|---|---|
| 1 | Doruk Üçer | 13 March 2000 | | R | | |
| 10 | Ulvi Burtay Akkaya | 2 May 1998 | | B | | |
| 3 | Utku Binkanat | 29 February 2000 | | R | | |
| 5 | Berk Bıyık | 1 January 1993 | | B | 190 cm | |
| 2 | Engin Ege Çolak | 3 January 1997 | | B | 188 cm | |
| 11 | Atakan Destici | 9 March 1997 | | B | 187 cm | |
| 2 | Gökmen Mehmet Dilek | 5 February 1999 | | B | | |
| 1 | Berk Gezek | 13 November 1992 | Goalkeeper | B | | |
| 2 | Kaan Gezgüç | 4 January 2000 | | B | | |
| 6 | Osman Selim Gülenç | 7 July 1992 | | B | 190 cm | |
| 12 | Zeki Alican Gürelli | 22 March 1999 | | B | | |
| 3 | Mlađan Janović | 11 June 1984 | | B | 190 cm | 93 kg |
| 13 | Hüseyin Kağan Kil | 23 July 1999 | | R | | |
| 7 | Slobodan Nikić | 25 January 1983 | | B | 196 cm | 94 kg |
| 15 | Oğulbey Önkül | 25 August 1998 | | R | 184 cm | |
| 10 | Neşfet Toğkan Özbek Özbek | 2 September 1994 | | B | | |
| 17 | Hikmet Batuhan Öztemel | 7 January 1998 | | R | | |
| 8 | Vjekoslav Pasković | 23 March 1985 | | B | 181 cm | 85 kg |
| 13 | Miloš Šćepanović | 9 October 1982 | Goalkeeper | B | 185 cm | 88 kg |
| 4 | Oğuz Berke Senemoğlu | 3 July 1995 | | B | 185 cm | |
| 12 | Şafak Şimşek | 3 November 1997 | | B | 175 cm | |
| 11 | Eray Turan | 23 February 1998 | | B | | |
| 9 | Nikola Vukčević | 14 November 1985 | | B | 202 cm | |
| 24 | Can Yüksek | 17 September 1994 | | R | 184 cm | |

== Waspo Hannover ==
| No. | Name | Date of birth | Position | L/R | Height | Weight |
|---|---|---|---|---|---|---|
| 5 | Máté Balatoni | 20 January 1984 | | B | | |
| 4 | Marin Ban | 29 March 1986 | | B | | |
| 11 | Marko Bolović | 10 October 1990 | | B | 190 cm | |
| 3 | Erik Bukowski | 18 November 1986 | | B | | |
| 9 | Pere Esteany Esforzado | 22 February 1989 | | B | | |
| 6 | Felix Haarstick | 28 May 1988 | | R | 184 cm | |
| 7 | Alexander Herrmann | 12 May 1993 | | R | | |
| 8 | Ilja Immermann | 7 August 1991 | | R | 186 cm | |
| 7 | Predrag Jokić | 3 February 1983 | | B | | |
| 8 | David Kleine | 21 June 1990 | | B | 189 cm | |
| 1 | Roger Kong | 22 September 1984 | Goalkeeper | B | | |
| 12 | Bojan Paunović | 9 February 1990 | | B | 188 cm | |
| 13 | Ingo Pickert | 24 February 1986 | | R | 187 cm | |
| 14 | Daniele Polverino | 13 December 1979 | | R | 187 cm | |
| 6 | Aleksandar Radović | 24 February 1987 | | B | | |
| 13 | Márton Sági | 16 May 1990 | Goalkeeper | B | 183 cm | |
| 2 | Andreas Schlotterbeck | 2 March 1982 | | B | | |
| 18 | Lukas Taplick | 5 May 1990 | | R | 180 cm | |
| 8 | Marek Tkáč | 9 March 1995 | | B | | |
| 10 | Bence Tóth | 9 December 1988 | | B | 195 cm | |

== Jadran Carine ==
| No. | Name | Date of birth | Position | L/R | Height | Weight |
|---|---|---|---|---|---|---|
| 7 | Bojan Banićević | 9 March 1993 | | B | 187 cm | 88 kg |
| 2 | Dušan Banićević | 12 October 1998 | | R | | |
| 3 | Nikola Brkić | 1 September 1998 | | R | | |
| 2 | Filip Gardašević | 23 May 1997 | | B | 181 cm | 70 kg |
| 8 | Nikola Janović | 22 March 1980 | | B | | |
| 1 | Slaven Kandić | 2 April 1991 | Goalkeeper | B | 198 cm | 96 kg |
| 7 | Dragan Kolesko | 19 June 1997 | | R | 184 cm | 82 kg |
| 4 | Željko Kovačić | 17 December 1981 | | B | | |
| 6 | Petar Mijušković | 1 December 1999 | | B | 189 cm | 81 kg |
| 6 | Nikola Moskov | 28 October 1997 | | B | | |
| 11 | Aleksa Petrovski | 29 May 1996 | | B | | |
| 12 | Stefan Pješivac | 12 December 1996 | | B | 190 cm | 95 kg |
| 3 | Vlado Popadić | 25 April 1996 | | B | 189 cm | 82 kg |
| 13 | Miloš Popović | 12 April 1995 | Goalkeeper | B | | |
| 8 | Stefan Porobić | 18 January 1996 | | B | 186 cm | 71 kg |
| 9 | Đuro Radović | 20 February 1999 | | B | | |
| 10 | Miroslav Ranđić | 28 March 1989 | | B | | |
| 9 | Vladan Spaić | 18 June 1997 | | B | 185 cm | 83 kg |
| 19 | Petar Tešanović | 26 November 1998 | | R | | |
| 2 | Aleksa Ukropina | 28 September 1998 | | B | 194 cm | 85 kg |
| 9 | Nikola Vavić | 12 March 1992 | | B | | |
| 5 | Stefan Vidović | 8 August 1992 | | B | 189 cm | 81 kg |
| 23 | Boris Zloković | 16 March 1983 | | R | | |

== Jug Dubrovnik ==
| No. | Name | Date of birth | Position | L/R | Height | Weight |
|---|---|---|---|---|---|---|
| 19 | Marko Bautović | 3 August 1991 | | B | | |
| 11 | Hrvoje Benić | 20 April 1992 | | B | | |
| 1 | Marko Bijač | 12 January 1991 | Goalkeeper | B | 200 cm | 81 kg |
| 15 | Ivo Brailo | 14 January 2000 | | R | | |
| 16 | Kristijan Čulina | 12 October 2000 | | R | | |
| 3 | Loren Fatović | 16 November 1996 | | B | | |
| 6 | Xavier García Gadea | 5 January 1984 | | B | | |
| 21 | Toni Jarak | 19 March 1998 | Goalkeeper | B | | |
| 5 | Maro Joković | 1 October 1987 | | B | 203 cm | 96 kg |
| 20 | Filip Kržić | 28 August 2000 | | R | | |
| 4 | Luka Lončar | 26 June 1987 | | B | | |
| 8 | Marko Ivanković | 17 December 1991 | | B | | |
| 2 | Marko Macan | 26 April 1993 | | B | | |
| 17 | Jacob Merčep | 8 February 1998 | | B | | |
| 12 | Paulo Obradović | 9 March 1986 | | B | | |
| 14 | Nikola Pavličević | 13 February 1997 | | B | | |
| 7 | Pavo Marković | 20 April 1985 | | B | | |
| 18 | Petar Pejić | 8 February 2000 | | R | | |
| 10 | Felipe Perrone Rocha | 27 February 1986 | | B | | |
| 13 | Toni Popadić Batina | 5 November 1994 | Goalkeeper | B | | |
| 9 | Josip Vrlić | 25 April 1986 | | B | | |

== Lokomotiv Tbilisi ==
| No. | Name | Date of birth | Position | L/R | Height | Weight |
|---|---|---|---|---|---|---|
| 6 | Srđan Aksentijević | 31 January 1986 | | B | | |
| 8 | Mikheil Baghaturia | 9 May 1987 | | B | | |
| 3 | Zurab Chikvaidze | 10 May 1996 | | R | | |
| 3 | Levan Chikvinidze | 9 January 1993 | | B | | |
| 7 | Revaz Chomakhidze | 15 December 1973 | | B | | |
| 1 | Zurab Chumburidze | 8 March 1986 | Goalkeeper | B | | |
| 11 | Dragan Drašković | 1 September 1988 | | B | | |
| 10 | Konstantine Gegelashvili | 7 May 1983 | | B | | |
| 9 | Khvicha Jakhaia | 16 September 1996 | | R | | |
| 10 | Luka Kakhetelidze | 17 May 1995 | | R | | |
| 2 | Beka Kavtaradze | 9 July 1990 | | B | | |
| 4 | George Khvedeliani | 13 April 1988 | | B | | |
| 12 | Filip Kljajević | 25 June 1983 | Goalkeeper | B | | |
| 14 | Giorgi Magrakvelidze | 21 January 1998 | | R | | |
| 15 | Vazha Purtseladze | 8 February 1998 | | R | | |
| 9 | Zurab Rurua | 8 June 1987 | | B | | |
| 5 | Alexander Rusishvili | 25 February 1991 | | B | | |
| 13 | Nikoloz Shubladze | 27 December 1993 | Goalkeeper | B | | |
| 19 | Alexander Urushadze | 5 May 1993 | | R | | |

== CN Marseille ==
| No. | Name | Date of birth | Position | L/R | Height | Weight |
|---|---|---|---|---|---|---|
| 12 | Alexandre Camarasa | 10 June 1987 | | B | | |
| 2 | Jérémy Boughanem | 6 May 1998 | | R | | |
| 9 | Charles Canonne | 9 February 1996 | | B | | |
| 8 | Pierre Chandieu | 26 September 1998 | | R | | |
| 4 | Nicolas Constantin-Bicari | 5 December 1991 | | B | | |
| 7 | Ugo Crousillat | 27 October 1990 | | B | | |
| 11 | David Caumette | 28 March 1997 | | B | | |
| 1 | Rémi Garsau | 19 July 1984 | Goalkeeper | B | | |
| 9 | Alexandre Grimaldi | 22 December 1997 | | R | | |
| 8 | Guillaume Dino | 24 March 1995 | | B | | |
| 13 | Arshak Hovhannisyan | 24 January 1997 | Goalkeeper | B | | |
| 11 | Enzo Khasz | 13 August 1993 | | B | | |
| 10 | Igor Kovačević | 3 November 1988 | | B | | |
| 14 | Alexandre Mari | 28 June 1998 | | R | | |
| 15 | Romain Marion-Vernoux | 2 January 2000 | | R | | |
| 16 | Leonardo Monges | 23 March 1999 | | R | | |
| 5 | Sébastien Monneret | 7 October 1992 | | B | | |
| 3 | Mathias Olivon | 29 June 1995 | | B | | |
| 2 | Logan Piot | 30 November 1994 | | B | | |
| 20 | Hugo Roscio | 21 May 1999 | | R | | |
| 6 | Thibaut Simon | 18 December 1983 | | B | | |

== HAVK Mladost ==
| No. | Name | Date of birth | Position | L/R | Height | Weight |
|---|---|---|---|---|---|---|
| 1 | Luka Bajić | 25 April 2000 | | R | | |
| 10 | Andrija Vlahović | 23 September 1991 | | B | | |
| 3 | Andro Gagulić | 22 July 1995 | | R | | |
| 4 | Andrija Bašić | 9 September 1995 | | R | 193 cm | 92 kg |
| 4 | Matias Biljaka | 20 January 1999 | | B | | |
| 9 | Luka Brčić | 18 March 1997 | | B | | |
| 11 | Domagoj Jajčinović | 5 September 1996 | | B | 196 cm | 98 kg |
| 8 | Franko Geratović | 15 May 1992 | | R | | |
| 9 | Branimir Herceg | 14 February 2000 | | R | | |
| 7 | Ivan Capan | 14 August 1992 | | B | 193 cm | 93 kg |
| 1 | Ivan Marcelić | 18 February 1994 | Goalkeeper | B | 190 cm | 90 kg |
| 3 | Ivan Milaković | 13 August 1980 | | B | | |
| 13 | Ivan Pisk | 2 July 1992 | | R | 194 cm | 87 kg |
| 14 | Ivan Živković | 12 January 1995 | | R | 187 cm | 78 kg |
| 12 | Jerko Anzulović | 28 May 1987 | | B | | |
| 16 | Marin Jukić | 5 January 1995 | | R | 191 cm | 82 kg |
| 8 | Franko Lazić | 25 February 1998 | | B | | |
| 2 | Luka Bukić | 30 April 1994 | | B | | |
| 6 | Marin Dašić | 3 April 1998 | | B | 193 cm | 88 kg |
| 20 | Fran Paškvalin | 22 November 1984 | | R | | |
| 13 | Petar Juraj Selem | 4 January 1992 | Goalkeeper | B | | |
| 5 | Marko Valečić | 12 July 1999 | | B | | |
| 23 | Ivan Domagoj Zović | 18 June 1997 | | R | | |

== Montpellier ==
| No. | Name | Date of birth | Position | L/R | Height | Weight |
|---|---|---|---|---|---|---|
| 1 | Andrei Batin | 29 May 1997 | | R | | |
| 5 | Théo Avena | 17 April 1996 | | B | | |
| 8 | Bastien Vasseur | 11 November 1998 | | B | | |
| 2 | Maël Bonniou | 26 November 1996 | | B | | |
| 12 | Quentin Chipotel | 4 November 1982 | | B | 193 cm | 87 kg |
| 8 | David Heinrich | 3 March 1986 | | B | 185 cm | 87 kg |
| 13 | Léo Delgado | 13 August 1995 | Goalkeeper | B | 185 cm | 80 kg |
| 10 | Duje Živković | 19 December 1990 | | B | | |
| 7 | Petar Filipović | 15 September 1988 | | B | | |
| 1 | Gábor Jászberényi | 27 January 1982 | Goalkeeper | B | 196 cm | 96 kg |
| 9 | Uroš Kalinić | 7 April 1986 | | B | 200 cm | 97 kg |
| 11 | Geoffrey Laux | 14 December 1986 | | B | 177 cm | 77 kg |
| 3 | Miloš Maksimović | 25 January 1994 | | B | | |
| 14 | Marcel Spilliaert | 23 September 1999 | | R | | |
| 4 | Carl Martel | 27 February 1996 | | B | 188 cm | 75 kg |
| 6 | Ilija Mustur | 10 May 1994 | | B | 184 cm | 90 kg |

== Olympiacos ==
| No. | Name | Date of birth | Position | L/R | Height | Weight |
|---|---|---|---|---|---|---|
| 3 | Evangelos Delakas | 8 February 1985 | | B | | |
| 16 | Georgios Dervisis | 30 October 1994 | | B | | |
| 5 | Ioannis Fountoulis | 25 May 1988 | | B | | |
| 13 | Stefanos Galanopoulos | 22 February 1993 | Goalkeeper | B | | |
| 15 | Konstantinos Genidounias | 3 May 1993 | | B | | |
| 4 | Alexandros Gounas | 3 October 1989 | | B | | |
| 10 | Christodoulos Kolomvos | 26 October 1988 | | B | | |
| 11 | Blai Mallarach | 21 August 1987 | | B | | |
| 9 | Konstantinos Mourikis | 11 July 1988 | | B | | |
| 2 | Emmanouil Mylonakis | 9 April 1985 | | B | 185 cm | 74 kg |
| 8 | Georgios Ntoskas | 11 November 1984 | | B | 186 cm | 99 kg |
| 1 | Josip Pavić | 15 January 1982 | Goalkeeper | B | | |
| 7 | Kyriakos Pontikeas | 9 May 1991 | | B | | |
| 6 | Jesse Smith | 27 April 1983 | | B | | |
| 12 | Angelos Vlachopoulos | 28 September 1991 | | B | 180 cm | 73 kg |

== Digi Oradea ==
| No. | Name | Date of birth | Position | L/R | Height | Weight |
|---|---|---|---|---|---|---|
| 6 | Alex Popoviciu | 2 August 1990 | | B | | |
| 9 | Andrei Creţu | 21 September 1989 | | B | | |
| 5 | Mihnea Chioveanu | 21 August 1987 | | B | | |
| 8 | Vojislav Čupić | 10 March 1987 | | B | | |
| 13 | Dorin Creţu | 28 May 1988 | Goalkeeper | B | | |
| 7 | Ramiro Georgescu | 27 November 1982 | | B | | |
| 10 | Gheorghe Dunca | 30 March 1979 | | B | | |
| 11 | Gheorghe Mihnea-Andrei | 15 January 1994 | | B | | |
| 9 | Kálmán Kádár | 11 June 1979 | | R | | |
| 12 | Viktor Kováts | 13 January 1998 | | B | | |
| 4 | Dušan Marković | 3 May 1990 | | B | | |
| 3 | Tiberiu Negrean | 1 September 1988 | | B | | |
| 1 | Gojko Pijetlović | 7 August 1983 | Goalkeeper | B | | |
| 12 | Bogdan Remeş | 10 May 1998 | | B | | |
| 15 | Istvan Janos Szabo | 13 February 1997 | | R | | |
| 2 | Roland Szabó | 18 September 1996 | | B | | |

== OSC Budapest ==
| No. | Name | Date of birth | Position | L/R | Height | Weight |
|---|---|---|---|---|---|---|
| 13 | Botond Barabás | 8 July 1991 | Goalkeeper | B | | |
| 3 | Bence Bátori | 28 December 1991 | | B | 193 cm | 90 kg |
| 1 | Dávid Bisztritsányi | 7 July 1987 | Goalkeeper | B | 187 cm | 90 kg |
| 12 | Draško Brguljan | 27 December 1984 | | B | 194 cm | 85 kg |
| 11 | Erik Bundschuh | 14 July 1989 | | B | 205 cm | 90 kg |
| 2 | Ádám Decker | 29 February 1984 | | B | 203 cm | |
| 10 | Miklós Gór-Nagy | 8 January 1983 | | B | 192 cm | 90 kg |
| 8 | Kevin Graham | 21 April 1986 | | B | | |
| 7 | Gábor Hegedűs | 29 September 1983 | | B | 194 cm | 99 kg |
| 5 | Zsolt Juhász | 8 June 1985 | | B | 178 cm | 80 kg |
| 11 | Joseph Kayes | 1 March 1991 | | R | | |
| 6 | Gábor Kovács | 30 April 1989 | | B | 190 cm | 97 kg |
| 4 | Ádám Nagy | 19 May 1998 | | B | | |
| 4 | Toni Josef Német | 14 January 1994 | | B | | |
| 9 | Ferenc Salamon | 11 November 1988 | | B | 192 cm | 90 kg |
| 13 | Máté Szentesi | 13 February 1994 | Goalkeeper | B | | |

== Partizan ==
| No. | Name | Date of birth | Position | L/R | Height | Weight |
|---|---|---|---|---|---|---|
| 1 | Danilo Adžić | 26 November 1996 | | R | | |
| 12 | Mateja Asanović | 30 October 1995 | | B | | |
| 13 | Lazar Brakočević | 14 August 1996 | Goalkeeper | B | | |
| 6 | Radomir Drašović | 22 July 1997 | | B | | |
| 5 | Stefan Durlević | 27 April 1994 | | R | | |
| 2 | Lucas Gielen | 26 November 1990 | | B | | |
| 7 | Draško Gogov | 18 February 1995 | | B | | |
| 8 | Nikola Jakšić | 17 January 1997 | | B | | |
| 11 | Marko Janković | 27 December 1998 | | B | | |
| 10 | Petar Kasum | 27 January 1998 | | R | | |
| 11 | Marko Kruška | 30 October 1997 | | R | | |
| 3 | Đorđe Lazić | 19 May 1996 | | B | | |
| 13 | Nikola Lukić | 14 April 1998 | | R | | |
| 4 | Marko Manojlović | 1 April 1996 | | B | | |
| 10 | Filip Radojević | 2 November 1997 | | B | | |
| 16 | Nemanja Radonjić | 1 January 1997 | | R | | |
| 1 | Dimitrije Rističević | 7 November 1992 | Goalkeeper | B | | |
| 11 | Ognjen Stojanović | 27 April 1996 | | B | | |
| 5 | Gavril Subotić | 15 September 1995 | | B | | |
| 10 | Đorđe Tanasković | 2 March 1994 | | B | | |
| 3 | Dimitrios Tigkas | 1 April 1993 | | B | | |
| 22 | Petar Velkić | 17 April 1998 | | R | | |
| 9 | Nemanja Vico | 19 November 1994 | | B | | |
| 13 | Mateja Vlahović | 22 April 1999 | Goalkeeper | B | | |
| 12 | Đorđe Vučinić | 15 January 1999 | | B | | |

== VK Primorje ==
| No. | Name | Date of birth | Position | L/R | Height | Weight |
|---|---|---|---|---|---|---|
| 11 | Anđelo Šetka | 14 September 1985 | | B | 186 cm | 88 kg |
| 8 | Antonio Petrović | 24 September 1982 | | B | 193 cm | 95 kg |
| 12 | Miho Bošković | 11 January 1983 | | B | | |
| 2 | Damir Burić | 2 December 1980 | | B | 205 cm | 117 kg |
| 3 | Cosmin Radu | 9 November 1981 | | B | | |
| 13 | Fran Čubranić | 11 June 1997 | Goalkeeper | B | | |
| 7 | Dario Rakovac | 13 August 1996 | | R | | |
| 8 | Davor Car | 5 December 1979 | | R | | |
| 9 | Nikola Dedović | 25 January 1992 | | B | | |
| 10 | Gonzalo Oscar Echenique | 27 April 1990 | | B | | |
| 5 | Ivan Buljubašić | 31 October 1987 | | B | 198 cm | 108 kg |
| 12 | Ivo Radetić | 16 October 1997 | | B | | |
| 1 | Duje Jelovina | 29 April 1992 | Goalkeeper | B | | |
| 4 | Ivan Krapić | 14 February 1989 | | B | 196 cm | 106 kg |
| 15 | Jakov Kren | 8 October 1998 | Goalkeeper | R | | |
| 16 | Luka Križanec | 17 February 1983 | | R | | |
| 7 | Mislav Vrlić | 4 April 1996 | | B | 197 cm | 94 kg |
| 7 | Petar Muslim | 26 March 1988 | | B | 200 cm | 104 kg |
| 2 | Nino Mudražija | 21 July 1994 | | B | 195 cm | 90 kg |
| 5 | Duje Peroš | 15 February 1992 | | B | 186 cm | 89 kg |
| 1 | Frano Vićan | 24 January 1976 | Goalkeeper | B | 193 cm | 95 kg |
| 6 | Ante Vukičević | 24 February 1993 | | B | | |

== VK Radnički ==
| No. | Name | Date of birth | Position | L/R | Height | Weight |
|---|---|---|---|---|---|---|
| 7 | Edi Alijagić | 3 March 1992 | | B | | |
| 3 | Nino Blažević | 2 May 1992 | | B | | |
| 10 | Luka Bosić | 13 February 1998 | | B | | |
| 13 | Lazar Dobožanov | 21 December 1995 | Goalkeeper | B | | |
| 9 | Vukašin Ganić | 26 July 2000 | | B | | |
| 6 | Uroš Jevtić | 30 August 1999 | | R | | |
| 4 | Rade Joksimović | 11 July 1996 | | B | | |
| 8 | Vladimir Koković | 13 September 1996 | | R | | |
| 8 | Đorđe Lekić | 18 April 1995 | | B | | |
| 5 | Marko Martinić | 18 June 1990 | | B | | |
| 11 | Nemanja Mladenović | 12 June 1998 | | R | | |
| 12 | Miloš Ostojić | 20 February 1998 | | R | | |
| 13 | Ilija Prekogačić | 2 April 1996 | | R | | |
| 1 | Denis Šefik | 20 September 1976 | Goalkeeper | B | | |
| 6 | Nemanja Stanojević | 18 March 2001 | | B | | |
| 16 | Nikola Stanojević | 16 January 1999 | | R | | |
| 17 | Nebojša Toholj | 16 February 1997 | | R | | |
| 12 | Nikola Tomašević | 16 January 1989 | | B | | |
| 19 | Veljko Đerković | 19 October 1999 | | R | | |
| 20 | Vuk Verović | 26 September 1998 | | R | | |
| 11 | Lazar Živadinović | 5 April 1996 | | B | | |

== Pro Recco ==
| No. | Name | Date of birth | Position | L/R | Height | Weight |
|---|---|---|---|---|---|---|
| 11 | Aleksandar Ivović | 24 February 1986 | | B | 198 cm | 107 kg |
| 16 | Andrea Fondelli | 27 February 1994 | | B | 188 cm | 85 kg |
| 18 | Michael Bodegas | 3 May 1987 | | B | 192 cm | 102 kg |
| 2 | Francesco Di Fulvio | 15 August 1993 | | B | 188 cm | 82 kg |
| 10 | Filip Filipović | 2 May 1987 | | B | 197 cm | 101 kg |
| 13 | Giacomo Pastorino | 7 June 1980 | Goalkeeper | B | 191 cm | 95 kg |
| 15 | Alex Giorgetti | 24 December 1987 | | B | 186 cm | 78 kg |
| 3 | Dušan Mandić | 16 June 1994 | | B | 200 cm | 101 kg |
| 17 | Massimo Giacoppo | 10 May 1983 | | B | 183 cm | 92 kg |
| 8 | Matteo Aicardi | 19 April 1986 | | B | 192 cm | 104 kg |
| 5 | Niccolo' Figari | 24 January 1988 | | B | 198 cm | 90 kg |
| 12 | Niccolo' Gitto | 12 October 1986 | | B | 190 cm | 89 kg |
| 4 | Pietro Figlioli | 29 May 1984 | | B | 192 cm | 97 kg |
| 6 | Duško Pijetlović | 25 April 1985 | | B | 192 cm | 105 kg |
| 7 | Andrija Prlainović | 28 April 1987 | | B | 187 cm | 95 kg |
| 14 | Stefano Tempesti | 9 June 1986 | Goalkeeper | B | 203 cm | 97 kg |
| 9 | Sandro Sukno | 30 June 1990 | | B | 200 cm | 91 kg |
| 1 | Fabio Viola | 9 January 1996 | Goalkeeper | B | 195 cm | 103 kg |

== CN Sabadell ==
| No. | Name | Date of birth | Position | L/R | Height | Weight |
|---|---|---|---|---|---|---|
| 8 | Abraham Alcaide Portillo | 1 December 1990 | | B | | |
| 2 | Sergi Cabanas Pegado | 10 February 1996 | | B | | |
| 12 | Victor Cabanas Pegado | 20 November 1992 | | B | | |
| 9 | Borja Fenoy Valverde | 6 August 1997 | | B | | |
| 10 | Iván Gallego Vela | 13 February 1987 | | B | | |
| 11 | Esteban Gómez Saavedra | 21 May 1994 | | B | | |
| 5 | Miguel Hernando García | 16 March 1982 | | B | | |
| 3 | Jesse Koopman | 4 April 1993 | | B | | |
| 7 | Gonzalo López Escribano | 21 March 1989 | | B | | |
| 13 | Jordi Mardones Carreras | 10 September 1996 | Goalkeeper | B | | |
| 11 | Eric Marsal Marti | 9 January 1985 | | R | | |
| 4 | Vicente Matoso Alguacil | 21 June 1993 | | B | | |
| 1 | Josè M. Motos Martin | 22 June 1992 | Goalkeeper | B | | |
| 6 | Marc Soler Sallent | 7 September 1990 | | B | | |

== Spandau 04 ==
| No. | Name | Date of birth | Position | L/R | Height | Weight |
|---|---|---|---|---|---|---|
| 1 | László Baksa | 29 January 1986 | Goalkeeper | B | 195 cm | 88 kg |
| 2 | Maximilian Costa | 21 November 1996 | | R | 182 cm | 76 kg |
| 4 | Mateo Ćuk | 21 February 1990 | | B | 196 cm | 105 kg |
| 12 | Tim Donner | 8 February 1993 | | B | 192 cm | 87 kg |
| 12 | Hatem El Ghannam | 9 September 1989 | | B | | |
| 6 | Philipp Gottfried | 12 July 1994 | | R | 186 cm | 78 kg |
| 12 | Spencer Hamby | 12 March 1991 | | B | | |
| 8 | Vincent Hebisch | 2 January 1995 | | R | | |
| 9 | Dan Hilgendorf | 3 August 1998 | | R | | |
| 13 | Tim Höhne | 9 March 1987 | Goalkeeper | B | 192 cm | 92 kg |
| 6 | Maurice Jungling | 6 October 1991 | | B | 184 cm | 88 kg |
| 6 | Lukas Küppers | 31 July 1996 | | B | | |
| 7 | Mehdi Marzouki | 26 May 1987 | | B | | |
| 8 | Erik Miers | 20 October 1983 | | B | 203 cm | 98 kg |
| 10 | Moritz Oeler | 21 October 1985 | | B | 188 cm | 84 kg |
| 16 | Marc Politze | 21 October 1977 | | R | | |
| 5 | Tobias Preuss | 3 August 1988 | | B | | |
| 11 | Marin Restović | 22 July 1990 | | B | 193 cm | 93 kg |
| 2 | Remi Saudadier | 20 March 1986 | | B | | |
| 3 | Christian Schlanstedt | 10 January 1987 | | B | | |
| 21 | Fabian Schroedter | 11 September 1982 | | R | | |
| 9 | Marko Stamm | 30 August 1988 | | B | 187 cm | 96 kg |
| 23 | Tomi Tadim | 25 August 1997 | | R | | |

== Spartak ==
| No. | Name | Date of birth | Position | L/R | Height | Weight |
|---|---|---|---|---|---|---|
| 12 | Alexey Agarkov | 6 April 1983 | | B | 186 cm | 92 kg |
| 8 | Stepan Andryukov | 11 February 1991 | | B | 190 cm | 90 kg |
| 6 | Artem Ashaev | 5 December 1988 | | B | 191 cm | 94 kg |
| 9 | Igor Bychkov | 21 January 1994 | | B | 201 cm | 103 kg |
| 4 | Yury Cheshev | 26 June 1986 | | B | 183 cm | 90 kg |
| 6 | Nikita Dogadin | 26 July 1998 | | R | | |
| 1 | Aleksandr Fedorov | 26 January 1981 | Goalkeeper | B | 197 cm | 90 kg |
| 13 | Petr Fedotov | 2 July 1992 | Goalkeeper | B | | |
| 5 | Vasily Fedotov | 15 August 1994 | | B | | |
| 7 | Pavel Khalturin | 15 September 1983 | | B | 194 cm | 103 kg |
| 5 | Konstantin Kiselev | 16 May 1995 | | B | | |
| 12 | Nikita Krug | 7 June 1998 | | R | | |
| 2 | Nikolay Lazarev | 26 February 1992 | | B | 191 cm | 90 kg |
| 11 | Sergey Lisunov | 12 October 1986 | | B | 198 cm | 115 kg |
| 15 | Sergey Mersh | 28 June 1999 | | R | | |
| 10 | Andrey Rekechinskiy | 7 January 1981 | | B | 190 cm | 120 kg |
| 17 | Konstantin Sheikin | 26 January 1999 | | R | | |
| 18 | Vitaly Statsenko | 21 July 1997 | | R | | |
| 19 | Vladislav Usov | 24 January 1998 | | R | | |
| 3 | Vitaly Yurchik | 17 May 1983 | | B | 204 cm | 118 kg |
| 21 | Vladislav Zaytsev | 25 January 1996 | | R | | |

== Szolnoki VSK ==
| No. | Name | Date of birth | Position | L/R | Height | Weight |
|---|---|---|---|---|---|---|
| 7 | Milan Aleksić | 13 May 1986 | | B | | |
| 13 | Attila Decker | 25 August 1987 | Goalkeeper | B | | |
| 16 | Bence Fülöp | 9 April 1991 | | B | | |
| 2 | Živko Gocić | 22 August 1982 | | B | | |
| 14 | Zoltán Hangay | 17 October 1988 | | B | | |
| 5 | Dávid Jansik | 28 February 1991 | | B | | |
| 17 | Ottó Józsa | 19 July 1995 | | R | | |
| 11 | Gábor Kis | 27 September 1982 | | B | | |
| 3 | Norbert Madaras | 1 December 1979 | | B | | |
| 6 | Tamás Mezei | 14 September 1990 | | B | | |
| 12 | Stefan Mitrović | 29 March 1988 | | B | | |
| 1 | Viktor Nagy | 24 July 1984 | Goalkeeper | B | | |
| 15 | Erik Szabó | 20 September 1995 | | R | | |
| 4 | Márton Vámos | 24 June 1992 | | B | | |
| 9 | Dániel Rudolf Varga | 25 September 1983 | | B | | |
| 10 | Dénes Andor Varga | 29 March 1987 | | B | | |
| 8 | Aaron Younger | 25 September 1991 | | B | 193 cm | |

== Valletta ==
| No. | Name | Date of birth | Position | L/R | Height | Weight |
|---|---|---|---|---|---|---|
| 1 | Alan Borg Cole | 5 October 1990 | Goalkeeper | B | | |
| 2 | Alexander Attard Littschwager | 19 January 1992 | | R | | |
| 9 | Edward Aquilina | 22 July 1983 | | B | | |
| 4 | Peter Borg | 7 February 1990 | | R | | |
| 2 | Nicholas Bugelli | 11 February 1997 | | B | | |
| 4 | Luke Caruana | 16 January 1994 | | B | | |
| 10 | Aurelien Nicholas Cousin | 1 February 1980 | | B | | |
| 12 | Dino Zammit | 14 December 1994 | | B | | |
| 9 | Jerome Gabarretta | 3 June 1990 | | R | | |
| 3 | Andreas Galea | 17 September 1996 | | B | | |
| 11 | Marc Grech | 20 February 1996 | | R | | |
| 13 | Niki Grixti | 13 October 1995 | Goalkeeper | B | | |
| 8 | Jordan Camilleri | 14 September 1992 | | B | | |
| 14 | Kai Dowling | 15 April 1995 | | R | | |
| 5 | Mark Meli | 23 September 1986 | | B | | |
| 6 | Matthew Zammit | 1 October 1987 | | B | | |
| 11 | Clint Mercieca | 31 October 1982 | | B | | |
| 7 | Ryan Mock | 10 February 1990 | | B | | |
| 19 | Niki Lanzon | 16 September 1980 | | R | | |
| 20 | Ben Plumpton | 16 February 1998 | | R | | |
| 21 | Micheal Rizzo | 17 September 1984 | | R | | |
| 22 | Joseph Sammut | 16 November 1989 | | R | | |
| 23 | Ryan Sciortino | 18 April 1991 | | R | | |
| 24 | John Soler | 25 April 1980 | | R | | |
| 25 | Michele Stellini | 12 September 1983 | | R | | |

== Sm Verona ==
| No. | Name | Date of birth | Position | L/R | Height | Weight |
|---|---|---|---|---|---|---|
| 13 | Vinicius Biagi Antonelli | 1 March 1990 | Goalkeeper | B | | |
| 10 | Giacomo Bini | 5 September 1990 | | B | | |
| 3 | Alessandro Brambilla | 27 January 1993 | | B | | |
| 7 | Tommaso Busilacchi | 3 November 1994 | | B | | |
| 4 | Francesco Coppoli | 27 December 1995 | | B | | |
| 12 | Arnaldo Deserti | 1 April 1979 | | B | | |
| 2 | Andrea Di Fulvio | 21 June 1988 | | B | | |
| 3 | Edoardo Di Somma | 30 September 1996 | | B | | |
| 8 | Marko Jelača | 15 December 1982 | | B | | |
| 9 | Cristiano Mirarchi | 11 July 1991 | | B | | |
| 1 | Paolo Oliva | 11 October 1990 | Goalkeeper | B | | |
| 6 | Antonio Petković | 11 January 1986 | | B | | |
| 11 | Andrea Razzi | 9 December 1988 | | B | | |
| 5 | Tommaso Vergano | 19 March 1993 | | B | | |
| 15 | Predrag Zimonjić | 15 October 1970 | | R | | |

== NC Vouliagmeni ==
| No. | Name | Date of birth | Position | L/R | Height | Weight |
|---|---|---|---|---|---|---|
| 8 | Artin Elmisian | 18 October 1982 | | B | | |
| 2 | Georgios Bougiouris | 7 August 1998 | | R | | |
| 7 | Christos Afroudakis | 23 May 1984 | | B | | |
| 5 | Athanasios Chrysospathis | 13 October 1994 | | B | | |
| 3 | Nikolaos Delagrammatikas | 12 March 1998 | | B | | |
| 4 | Ioannis Velonias | 12 March 1993 | | B | | |
| 12 | Giorgos Kalaitzis | 15 March 1997 | | B | | |
| 8 | Foivos Kalis | 20 March 1998 | | R | | |
| 10 | Marios Kapotsis | 13 September 1991 | | B | | |
| 6 | Konstantinos Gouvis | 10 March 1994 | | B | | |
| 1 | Konstantinos Tsalkanis | 23 April 1982 | Goalkeeper | B | | |
| 9 | Nikolaos Kopeliadis | 5 August 1996 | | B | | |
| 13 | Dimitrios Kourouvanis | 7 August 1998 | | R | | |
| 14 | Stamatios Molochadis | 7 January 1998 | | R | | |
| 11 | Panagiotis Papadogkonas | 16 September 1987 | | B | | |
| 16 | Dionysios Theodosis | 4 June 1997 | | R | | |
| 2 | Matthaios Voulgarakis | 14 March 1980 | | B | | |
| 13 | Emmanouil Zerdevas | 12 August 1997 | Goalkeeper | B | | |
