= 2016–17 LEN Euro Cup squads =

This is a list of the squads with their players that competed at the 2016–17 LEN Euro Cup.

== Pays D'Aix Natation ==
No.	Name	Date of birth	Position	L/R
	Billy Noyon	3 January 1994	Goalkeeper	
	Thomas Saux	6 October 1992		
	Bojan Paunovic	3 February 1990		
	Gabin Verweirde	6 November 2000		
	Enzo Khasz	13 August 1993		
	Joyce Lothmann	4 July 1993		
	Alexandre Chauffour	8 April 1995		
	Maxime Dethier	10 April 1993		
	Quentin Vandermeulen	13 April 1989		
	LERA Ruben De	28 March 1992		
	Dmitrii Kholod	16 January 1992		
	Lucas Bonnaud	1 March 1998	Goalkeeper	
	Tom Beteille	11 February 1998		
	Lucas Beteille	11 February 1998		
	Martin Launay	25 January 2001		
	Valentin Bakircilar	30 April 2001		
	Leni Souron	23 February 2001		
	Kaela Billet	17 April 2001		
	Laurent Pouillier	13 January 1986		
	Paul Pittion	19 December 2000		
	Lucas Veron	23 October 1993		

== Bayer Uerdingen ==
No.	Name	Date of birth	Position	L/R
	Niklas Baerendahls	22 March 1995	Goalkeeper	
	Dustin Bauch	3 July 1997		
	Julian Fleck	6 April 1987		
	Tobias Gietz	14 July 1987		
	Oliver Greck	30 May 1988	Goalkeeper	
	Lazar Kilibarda	10 March 1986		
	Gergo Kovacs	15 January 1988		
	Frederik Neber	6 January 1997		
	Gerrit Pape	19 January 1993		
	Mate Rajna	14 January 1991		
	Ben Reibel	27 August 1997		
	Sven Roessing	30 November 1986		
	Marvin Thran	1 June 1992		
	Simon Freisem	6 October 1999		
	Max Gredig	11 August 1999		
	Tobias Tamson	5 December 1992		
	Lucca Janzen	13 January 1990		
	Tim Bongartz	8 July 1998		
	Peer Oberhoff	2 February 1999		
	Sebastian Neber	25 November 1999		
	Vincent Tadday	19 March 2001		
	Simon Luedtke	20 May 2000		
	Kai Gredig	31 May 1997		
	Moritz Wlasowicz	6 January 1999		

== Canottieri Napoli ==
No.	Name	Date of birth	Position	L/R
	Manuel Rossa	23 January 1999	Goalkeeper	
	Fabrizio Buonocore	28 April 1977		
	Antonio Maccioni	8 June 1998		
	Gaetano Baviera	15 September 1998		
	Alex Giorgetti	24 December 1987		
	Biagio Borrelli	31 January 1996		
	Vincenzo Dolce	11 May 1995		
	Eduardo Campopiano	8 April 1997		
	Matteo Gitto	2 July 1991		
	Alessandro Velotto	12 February 1995		
	Fabio Baraldi	21 March 1990		
	Umberto Esposito	11 August 1995		
	Gabriele Vassallo	1 May 1993	Goalkeeper	
	Massimo Di Martire	31 January 2000		

== FTC Budapest ==
No.	Name	Date of birth	Position	L/R
	Andras Gardonyi	6 February 1986	Goalkeeper	
	Marko Avramovic	24 August 1986		
	Farkas Dory	11 September 1993		
	Simon Vogel	14 March 1996		
	Balazs Nyeki	2 August 1980		
	Zoltan Pohl	27 March 1995		
	Szilárd Jansik	6 April 1994		
	Marton Toth	28 September 1985		
	Marko Cuk	10 January 1984		
	Soma Vogel	7 July 1997	Goalkeeper	
	Daniel Varga	25 September 1983		
	Norbert Madaras	1 December 1979		
	Miklos Jokai	16 April 1999		
	David Gal	23 June 1999		
	Marton Irmes	26 February 1998		
	Balint Turnai	20 October 1999		
	Andras Turnai	20 October 1999		
	Balazs Sziranyi	10 January 1983		
	Gergo Katonas	25 February 1980		
	Stefan Mitrovic	29 March 1988		

== Hornets Kosice ==
No.	Name	Date of birth	Position	L/R
	Tomas Hoferica	22 November 1993	Goalkeeper	
	Tomas Krempasky	29 July 1989	Goalkeeper	
	Juraj Hromada	23 October 1992		
	Petr Markoch	24 February 1990		
	Denis Kruglov	5 June 1993		
	Samuel Balaz	5 January 1994		
	Ladislav Vidumansky	11 October 1984		
	Tomas Kostelnik	14 April 1994		
	Richard Kiernosz	12 February 1997		
	Tomas Oros	14 April 1990		
	Samuel Baran	8 February 1999		
	Maksym Ratkov	29 April 1989		
	Adam Mitruk	10 May 1999		
	Peter Barger	4 June 1999		
	Martin Palascak	18 April 1881		
	Martin Laciak	18 August 2000		
	Robert Kaid	11 May 1999		
	Volodymyr Voitenko	16 May 1989		
	Martin Binar	19 July 1999		

== Jadran Carine ==
No.	Name	Date of birth	Position	L/R
	Miloš Šćepanović	9 October 1982	Goalkeeper	
	Marko Petković	3 March 1989		
	Daniil Merkulov	3 March 1997		
	Danilo Radović	10 March 2001		
	Martin Gardašević	9 October 2000		
	Luka Murišić	5 January 2000		
	Željko Kovacić	17 December 1981		
	Slaven Kandić	2 April 1991	Goalkeeper	
	Stefan Vidović	8 August 1992		
	Bojan Banićević	9 March 1993		
	Stefan Porobić	18 January 1996		
	Vlado Popadic	25 April 1996		
	Stefan Pješivac	12 December 1996		
	Vladan Spaić	18 June 1997		
	Nikola Moskov	28 October 1997		
	Filip Gardasević	23 May 1997		
	Aleksa Ukropina	28 September 1998		
	Petar Tesanović	26 November 1998	Goalkeeper	
	Nikola Brkić	1 September 1998		
	Dušan Banićević	12 October 1998		
	Đuro Radović	20 February 1999		
	Petar Mijušković	1 December 1999		
	Dragan Kolesko	19 June 1997		

== Kinef Kirishi ==
No.	Name	Date of birth	Position	L/R
	Aleksandr Iatsenko	25 July 1987		
	Artur Salakhov	11 June 1991		
	Aleksey Kuzmenko	20 August 1985		
	Daniil Andreev	15 July 1997		
	Daniil Maltcev	30 October 1992		
	Timur Sykalov	30 December 1991		
	Aleksei Bogdanov	5 July 1996	Goalkeeper	
	Igor Stepanov	7 November 1999		
	Viktar Ivanou	30 July 1992		
	Vasilii Eskov	25 April 1989		
	Alexander Kostyukevich	31 January 1996		
	Bogdan Melentev	25 August 1998		
	Grigorii Gridnev	19 November 1998	Goalkeeper	
	Victor Buyak	31 January 1991		
	Dmitrii Taraskov	8 August 1995		
	Dmitrii Kablukov	31 March 1996		
	Vitalii Kiselev	4 April 1997		

== Primorac Kotor ==
No.	Name	Date of birth	Position	L/R
	Dimitrije Krijestorac	15 July 1996		
	Janko Krivokapic	4 March 1996		
	Goran Grgurevic	21 March 1998		
	Dusan Matkovic	1 February 1999		
	Darko Brkanovic	10 March 1999		
	Ivan Radonjic	7 February 1999		
	Vidak Todorovic	5 April 2000		
	Milos Sekulic	6 July 2000		
	Ugljesa Vukasovic	23 January 1995		
	Matija Brguljan	22 December 1995		
	Danilo Adzic	26 November 1996		
	Nicolas Saveljic	12 September 1998		
	Vedran Latkovic	20 May 1998		
	Jaksa Kosic	24 November 1993		
	Igor Zubac	23 November 1993	Goalkeeper	
	Antonio Petrovic	24 September 1982		
	Marko Gopcevic	3 September 1990		
	Milorad Radunovic	20 December 1994		
	Milos Popovic	12 April 1995	Goalkeeper	
	Nikola Radonjic	1 January 1997		
	Ugljesa Brguljan	25 December 1986		

== Mladost Zagreb ==
No.	Name	Date of birth	Position	L/R
	Ivan Milakovic	13 August 1980		
	Luka Bukic	30 April 1994		
	Ivan Marcelic	18 February 1994	Goalkeeper	
	Marko Pavicic	1 March 1991		
	Andrija Basic	9 September 1995		
	Andrija Vlahovic	23 September 1991		
	Ivan Zovic	8 June 1997		
	Hrvoje Brlecic	24 August 1983		
	Frano Vican	24 January 1976	Goalkeeper	
	Franko Lazic	25 February 1998		
	Matias Biljaka	20 January 1999		
	Fran Paskvalin	22 November 1984		
	Marko Valecic	12 July 1999		
	Jakov Markic	14 September 2000		
	Branimir Herceg	14 February 2000		
	Luka Bajic	25 April 2000		
	Mate Mardesic	20 February 2000		
	Davorin Sulekic	10 March 1999		
	Andro Nekic	15 June 1997		

== Montpellier ==
No.	Name	Date of birth	Position	L/R
	Tom Christiaens	11 November 1999		
	Carl Martel	27 February 1996		
	Marcel Spilliaert	23 September 1999		
	Andrei Batin	29 May 1997		
	Julien Privat	8 March 1999		
	Bastien Belleil	27 August 2000		
	Alexandre Bouet	5 December 2000		
	Leo Delgado	13 August 1995	Goalkeeper	
	Logan Piot	30 November 1994		
	Bastien Vasseur	11 November 1998		
	Ivan Delas	8 November 1988		
	Marko Martinic	18 June 1990		
	Ilija Mustur	10 May 1994		
	Theo Avena	17 April 1996		
	David Heinrich	3 March 1986		
	Uros Kalinic	7 April 1986		
	Duje Zivkovic	19 December 1990		
	Geoffrey Laux	14 December 1986		
	Drazen Kujacic	20 May 1990		
	Elias Redjala	13 August 1995	Goalkeeper	

== Digi Oradea ==
No.	Name	Date of birth	Position	L/R
	Maximilian Costa	21 November 1996		
	Cristian Dobre	12 December 1997		
	Andrei Cretu	21 September 1989		
	Nicolae Diaconu	4 September 1980		
	Gojko Pijetlovic	7 August 1983	Goalkeeper	
	Florin Dorin Cretu	28 May 1988	Goalkeeper	
	Viktor Kovats	13 January 1998		
	Istvan Szabo	13 February 1997		
	Andrei Prioteasa	3 April 1996		
	Bogdan Remes	10 May 1998		
	Tiberiu Negrean	1 September 1988		
	Mihnea Gheorghe	15 January 1994		
	Mihnea Chioveanu	21 August 1987		
	Ramiro Georgescu	27 November 1982		
	Mateja Asanovic	30 October 1995		
	Boris Pavlovic	12 October 1980		
	Nikola Raden	29 January 1985		
	Raul Gavris	9 November 1998		
	Kalman Kadar	11 June 1979		

== Posillipo Napoli ==
No.	Name	Date of birth	Position	L/R
	Nicola Cuccovillo	16 December 6719		
	Simone Rossi	3 November 1990		
	Gianluigi Foglio	3 June 1995		
	Filip Klikovac	7 February 1989		
	Giuliano Mattiello	23 October 1992		
	IODICE Vincenzo Renzuto	8 April 1993		
	Gavril Subotić	15 September 1995		
	Angelos Vlachopoulos	28 September 1991		
	Luca Marziali	15 April 1991		
	Georgios Dervisis	30 October 1994		
	Paride Saccoia	6 February 1989		
	Tommaso Negri	26 May 1986	Goalkeeper	
	Domenico Iodice	19 February 2001		
	Marco Ricci	4 June 2001		
	Luca Silvestri	26 February 2002		
	Giuseppe Pezzullo	8 August 2001		
	Jacopo Parrella	26 June 2002		
	Pierpaolo Parrella	6 April 2001		
	Antracite Lignano	2 June 1970		
	Mikhailo Sudomlyak	13 December 1999	Goalkeeper	

== OSC Potsdam ==
No.	Name	Date of birth	Position	L/R
	Matteo Dufour	7 April 1991		
	Hatem El Ghannam	9 September 1989		
	Bastian Kaiser	5 October 1990		
	Michael Knelangen	9 November 1988	Goalkeeper	
	Tobias Knuettel	22 June 1998	Goalkeeper	
	Ferdinand Korbel	4 February 1996		
	Florenz Korbel	22 February 1999		
	Frederick Korbel	29 June 1997		
	Max Koessler	9 February 1996		
	Marc Langer	10 February 1991		
	Erik Miers	20 October 1983		
	Thilo Popp	16 February 1998		
	Daniel Reimer	11 November 1998		
	Christian Saggau	26 November 1991		
	Gabriel Satanovsky	3 April 1997		
	Hannes Schulz	25 May 1990		
	Alexander Schwarze	22 October 1998		
	Denis Strelezkij	22 April 1998		
	Alexander Tchigir	6 November 1968		
	Lu Meo Ulrich	11 October 2000		
	Reiko Zech	22 May 1995		
	Philip Uhlig	11 November 1990		

== VK Primorje ==
No.	Name	Date of birth	Position	L/R
	Maros Tkac	13 July 1996		
	Nathan Power McKenzie	13 February 1993		
	Lovro Paparić	5 August 1999		
	Mateo Saftic	20 January 1999		
	Marko Radulović	6 January 2001		
	Ian Petric	13 May 1999		
	Sven Augusti	18 March 1999		
	Duje Peros	15 February 1992		
	Ivan Buljubasic	31 October 1987		
	Fran Čubranić	11 June 1997	Goalkeeper	
	Mislav Vrlić	4 April 1996		
	Nino Mudrazija	21 July 1994		
	Duje Jelovina	29 April 1992	Goalkeeper	
	Cosmin Radu	9 November 1981		
	Dario Rakovac	13 August 1996		
	Ante Vukicevic	24 February 1993		
	Marko Blazic	11 August 1999		
	Petar Bozic	2 June 1999		
	Silvio Poropat	24 January 2000		
	Tin Brubnjak	20 February 2001		
	Antonio Cunko	26 July 1998		

== Posk Split ==
No.	Name	Date of birth	Position	L/R
	Mate Anic	6 April 1994	Goalkeeper	
	Ivo Bego	14 January 1998		
	Ivo Begovic	22 March 1993		
	Marin Borovcic	18 March 1996		
	Kresimir Butic	27 April 1994		
	Zvonimir Butic	2 November 1998		
	Marin Delic	3 June 1996		
	Andro Franicevic	17 June 1985		
	Boze Gadza	1 August 1997		
	Aljosa Kunac	18 August 1980		
	Jerko Penava	13 April 2001		
	Josip Radmilo	28 August 1997		
	Eugen Sunara	19 May 1999	Goalkeeper	
	Stipe Situm	24 December 1999		
	Dominik Skoric	25 December 1999		
	Luka Vukic	9 January 1989		

== Shturm 2002 ==
No.	Name	Date of birth	Position	L/R
	Egor Vasilyev	30 April 1996		
	Ivan Suchkov	15 June 1995		
	Vladimir Zaikin	25 September 1996		
	Egor Emelianov	21 November 1998		
	German Panaioti	24 June 1997		
	Konstantin Kharkov	23 February 1997		
	Iurii Poliakov	7 March 1997	Goalkeeper	
	Artem Makas	31 August 1993	Goalkeeper	
	Pavel Kuzmenkov	29 June 1995		
	Koba Kintsurashvili	6 June 1994		
	Kanstantsin Averka	16 January 1997		
	Artem Khmelevskikh	29 November 1997		
	Vladimir Nezhinskii	16 November 1995		

== CN Terrassa ==
No.	Name	Date of birth	Position	L/R
	Iñaki Aguilar	9 September 1983	Goalkeeper	
	Xavier Serra	23 January 1996		
	Alvaro Granados	8 October 1998		
	Ricard Alarcón	18 August 1991		
	Oscar Aguilar	6 July 1987		
	Alex De La Fuente	17 March 1998		
	Francesc Sanchez	17 January 1987		
	Agusti Pericas	22 January 1997		
	Jordi Perez	4 March 1988		
	Donat Galeev	15 March 1995		
	Oriol Rodriguez	5 November 1999		
	Jordi Chico	24 January 1998		
	Oriol Albacete	18 February 1998	Goalkeeper	
	Marc Salvador	12 September 1998		

== SM Verona ==
No.	Name	Date of birth	Position	L/R
	Dejan Lazovic	8 February 1990	Goalkeeper	
	Valentino Gallo	17 May 1985		L
	Giuseppe Valentino	13 August 1990		
	Romain Blary	20 October 1990		
	Antonio Petkovic	11 January 1986		
	Niccolo' Gitto	11 January 1986		
	Stefano Luongo	5 January 1990		
	Marko Jelaca	15 December 1982		
	Cristiano Mirarchi	11 July 1991		
	Giacomo Bini	5 September 1990		
	Andrea Razzi	9 December 1988		
	Arnaldo Deserti	1 April 1979		
	Fabio Viola	9 January 1996	Goalkeeper	
	Alessandro Casieri	8 July 1999		
	Gabriel Gennari	4 May 1999		

== Bvsc-Zuglo ==
No.	Name	Date of birth	Position	L/R
	Attila Györke	12 March 1986	Goalkeeper	
	Károly Czigány	31 October 1984		
	Miklós Csapó	21 January 1993		
	Bence Szabó	29 February 1996		
	Kristóf Várnai	15 August 1995		
	Béla Török	23 March 1990		
	Krisztián Létay	9 February 1983		
	Ferenc Ambrus	9 December 1986		
	Péter Kovács	16 May 1991		
	Mátyás Pásztor	20 February 1987		
	Árpád Matyok	15 June 1996		
	Dániel Nagy	16 May 1996		
	Loránd Szabó	12 May 1994		
	Dániel Szakonyi	1 March 1994	Goalkeeper	
	Péter Sugár	20 March 1999		
	Milán Lipták	5 October 1997		
	György Ágh	16 September 1999		
	Olivér Fodor	29 August 2000		
	Zoltán Mizsei	1 November 1999		
	István Molnár	6 March 1999		
	Levente Szűcs	9 April 1982		
	András Marcz	17 July 1974		
	Sándor Nagy	2 November 1986		
