= Stefanos Santa =

Greek water polo player

Personal information
- Born: 21 May 1975 (age 51) Cluj-Napoca, Romania

Sport
- Sport: Water polo
Medal record
Representing Greece
World Championships
| Bronze medal – third place | 2005 Montreal | Team competition |

Stefanos-Petros Santa (born 21 May 1975) is a Greek water polo player who competed in the 2004 Summer Olympics. At the 1996 Olympics, he was a member of Romania national water polo team as Ștefan Sanda. Currently, he plays for AEK Athens.

== See also ==
- List of World Aquatics Championships medalists in water polo
