= Konstantinos Flegkas =

Greek water polo player

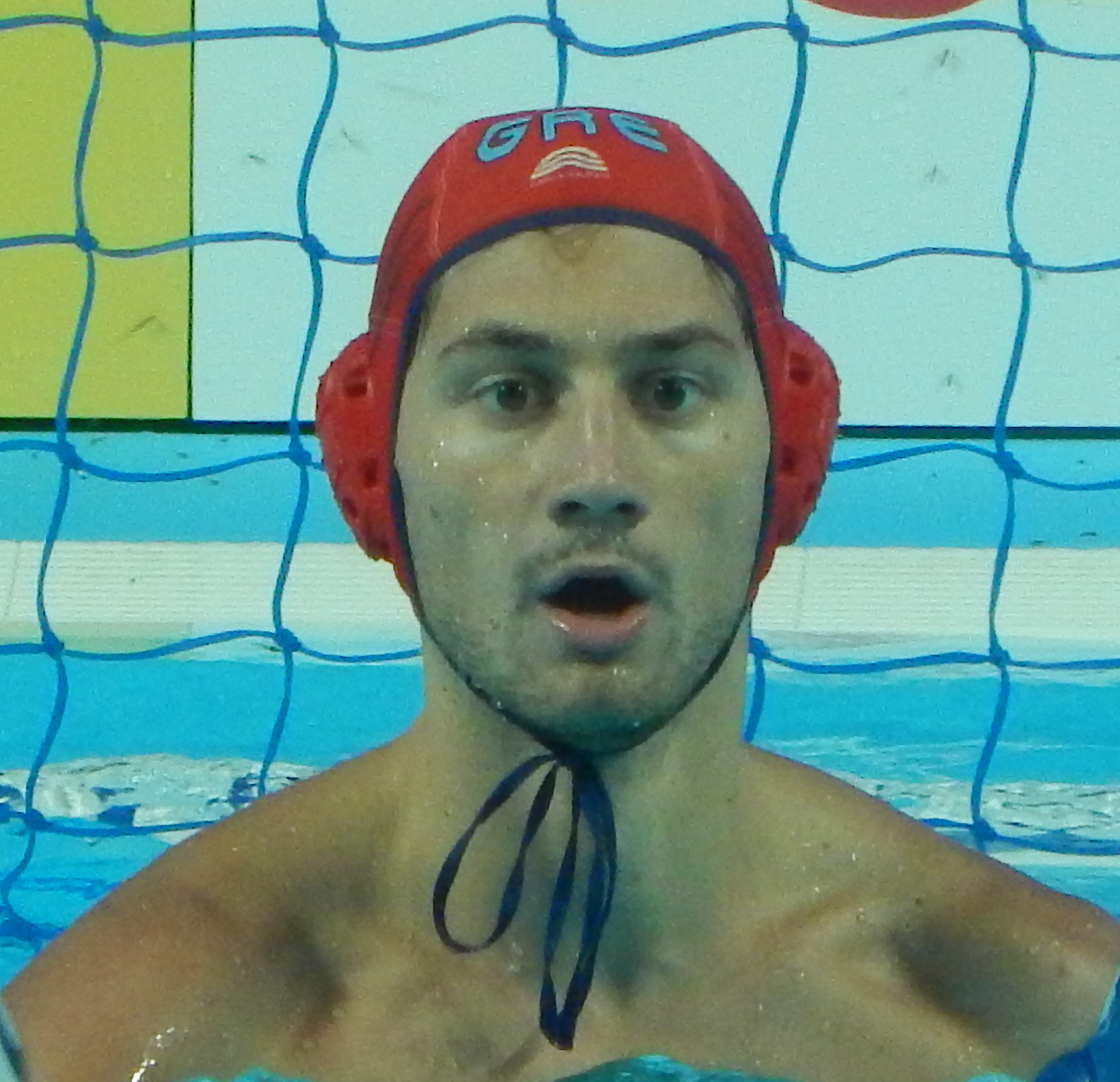

Personal information
- Born: 17 July 1988 (age 37) Greece
- Height: 192 cm (6 ft 4 in)
- Weight: 88 kg (194 lb)
Medal record
Men's water polo
Representing Greece
World Championships
Bronze medal – third place	2015 Kazan	Team
FINA World League
Bronze medal – third place	2016 Huizhou	Team
Mediterranean Games
Silver medal – second place	2018 Tarragona	Team
- Updated on 2 August 2018

Konstantinos Flegkas (born 17 July 1988) is a water polo player of AEK Athens and Greece. He was part of the Greek team winning the bronze medal at the 2015 World Aquatics Championships.

He was a member of the team that competed for Greece at the 2016 Summer Olympics. They finished in 6th place.

== Clubs ==
- (Greece) Panionios: 2005–2012
- (Greece) Nireas Lamias: 2012–2014
- (Greece) Ydraikos: 2014–2019
- (Greece) Panionios: 2019–2020
- (Greece) AEK Athens: 2020–
- (Greece) A.O.P.F: 2023-

== See also ==
- Greece men's Olympic water polo team records and statistics
- List of men's Olympic water polo tournament goalkeepers
- List of World Aquatics Championships medalists in water polo
