= Water polo at the 2013 Mediterranean Games =

- Dates: 19 – 25 June 2013

The water polo tournament at the 2013 Mediterranean Games in Mersin took place between 19 June and 25 June at the Mersin University, Çiftlikköy Campus Swimming Pool. Only the men's water polo tournament was held.

Croatia defeated Spain in the gold medal match.

== Medal summary ==
=== Events ===
Event	Gold	Silver	Bronze
Men	Croatia (CRO); Josip Pavić; Marko Bijač; Nikša Dobud; Ivan Krapić; Andro Bušlje; Ivan Milaković; Luka Lončar; Sandro Sukno; Petar Muslim; Luka Bukić; Maro Joković; Paulo Obradović; Anđelo Šetka	Spain (ESP); Iñaki Aguilar; Ricard Alarcón; Daniel Cercols; Rubén de Lera; Albert Español; Joel Esteller; Pere Estrany; Francisco Fernández; Xavier García; Daniel López; Blai Mallarach; Guillermo Molina; Xavier Vallés	Greece (GRE); Alexandros Gounas; Angelos Vlachopoulos; Christodoulos Kolomvos; Christos Afroudakis; Emmanouil Mylonakis; Evangelos Delakas; Ioannis Fountoulis; Konstantinos Galanidis; Konstantinos Genidounias; Konstantinos Gouvis; Konstantinos Mourikis; Konstantinos Tsalkanis; Kyriakos Pontikeas

== Participating nations ==
Following nations have applied to compete in men's tournament. At least six nations competing is the requirement for tournament to be held. None of the Asian and African nations have opted to compete.

Men

Federation	Nation
LEN Europe	Croatia; France; Greece; Italy; Serbia; Spain; Turkey
