= Christodoulos Kolomvos =

Greek water polo player

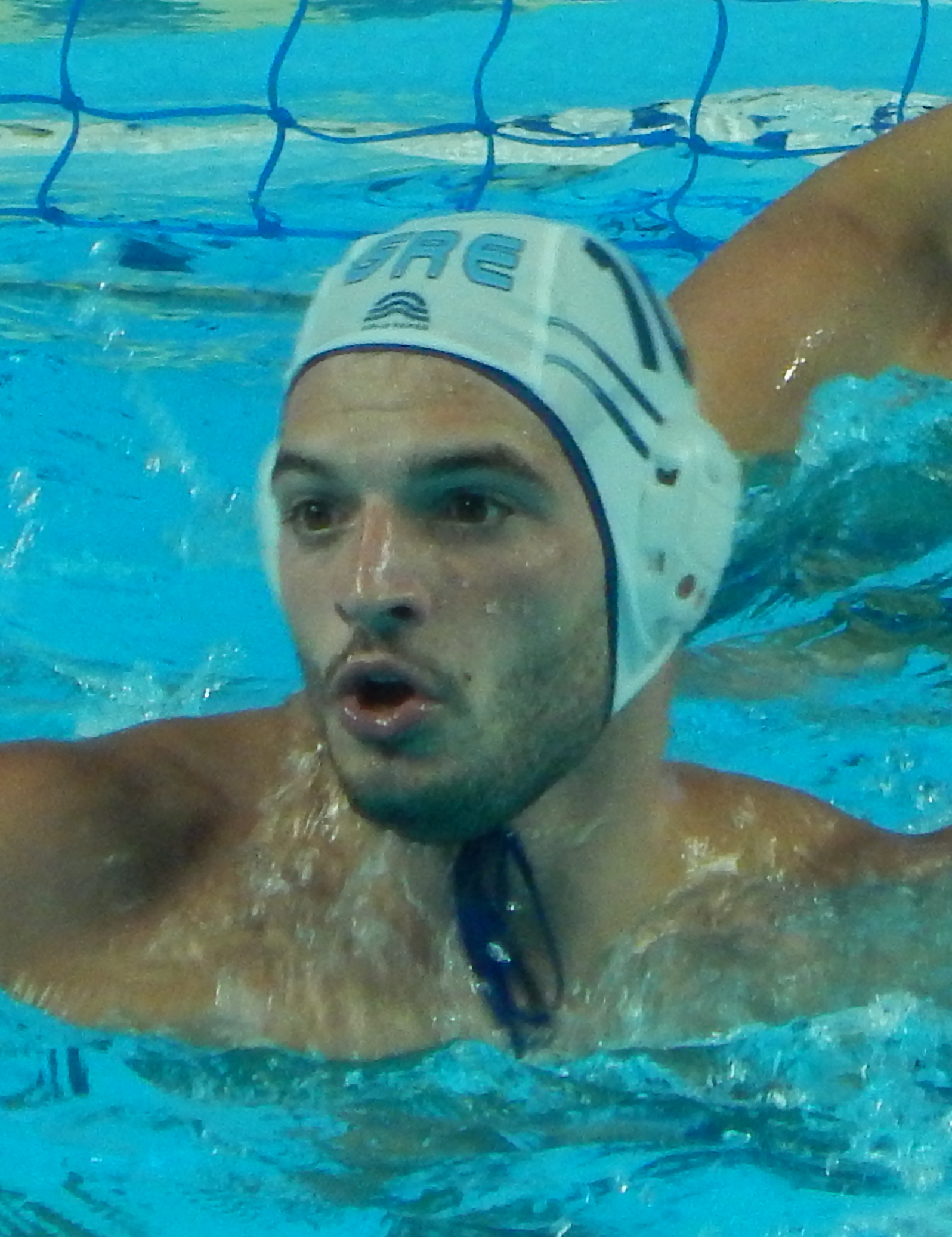
- Kolomvos in 2015

Personal information
- Nationality: Greek
- Born: 26 October 1988 (age 37) Patras, Greece
- Height: 186 cm (73 in)
- Weight: 103 kg (227 lb)

Sport
- Sport: Water polo
- Handedness: Right
- Position: Centre forward
- Current club: Enka SK

Senior clubs
- Years: Team
- 2007–2009: NO Patras
- 2009–2017: Olympiacos
- 2017–2021: Enka SK
- 2021–2023: Olympiacos
- 2023–present: Enka SK
Medal record
Men's water polo
Representing Greece
Olympic Games
Silver medal – second place	2020 Tokyo	Team
World Championships
Bronze medal – third place	2015 Kazan	Team
FINA World League
Bronze medal – third place	2016 Huizhou	Team
Bronze medal – third place	2020 Tbilisi	Team
Mediterranean Games
Silver medal – second place	2018 Tarragona	Team
Bronze medal – third place	2013 Mersin	Team
- Updated on 3 January 2024

Christodoulos Kolomvos (Greek: Χριστόδουλος Κολόμβος, born 26 October 1988) is a water polo player of Greece. He was part of the Greek team winning the bronze medal at the 2015 World Aquatics Championships.

He was a member of the team that competed for Greece at the 2016 Summer Olympics. They finished in 6th place.

He plays for Turkish powerhouse Enka SK.

== See also ==
- List of World Aquatics Championships medalists in water polo

== Honours ==
=== National team ===
- (silver) Silver Medal in 2020 Olympic Games, Tokyo
- (silver) Silver Medal in 2018 Mediterranean Games, Tarragona
- (bronze) Bronze Medal in 2013 Mediterranean Games, Mersin
- (bronze) Bronze Medal in 2015 World Championship, Kazan
- (bronze) Bronze Medal in 2016 World League, Huizhou
- (bronze) Bronze Medal in 2020 World League, Tbilisi
- 4th place in 2016 European Championship, Belgrade
- 4th place in 2017 World Championship, Budapest
- 6th place in 2016 Olympic Games, Rio

=== Club ===
Olympiacos

- Greek Championship (9): 2009–10, 2010–11, 2012–13, 2013–14, 2014–15, 2015–16, 2016–17, 2021–22, 2022–23
- Greek Cup (8): 2009–10, 2010–11, 2012–13, 2013–14, 2014–15, 2015–16, 2021–22, 2022–23
- LEN Champions League runners-up: 2015–16

ENKA

- Turkish Championship (2): 2018–19, 2020–21
- Turkish Cup (2): 2018–19, 2020–21

== Awards ==
- Greek Championship Rookie of the Year: 2009–10
