= Water polo at the 2015 World Aquatics Championships – Men's tournament =

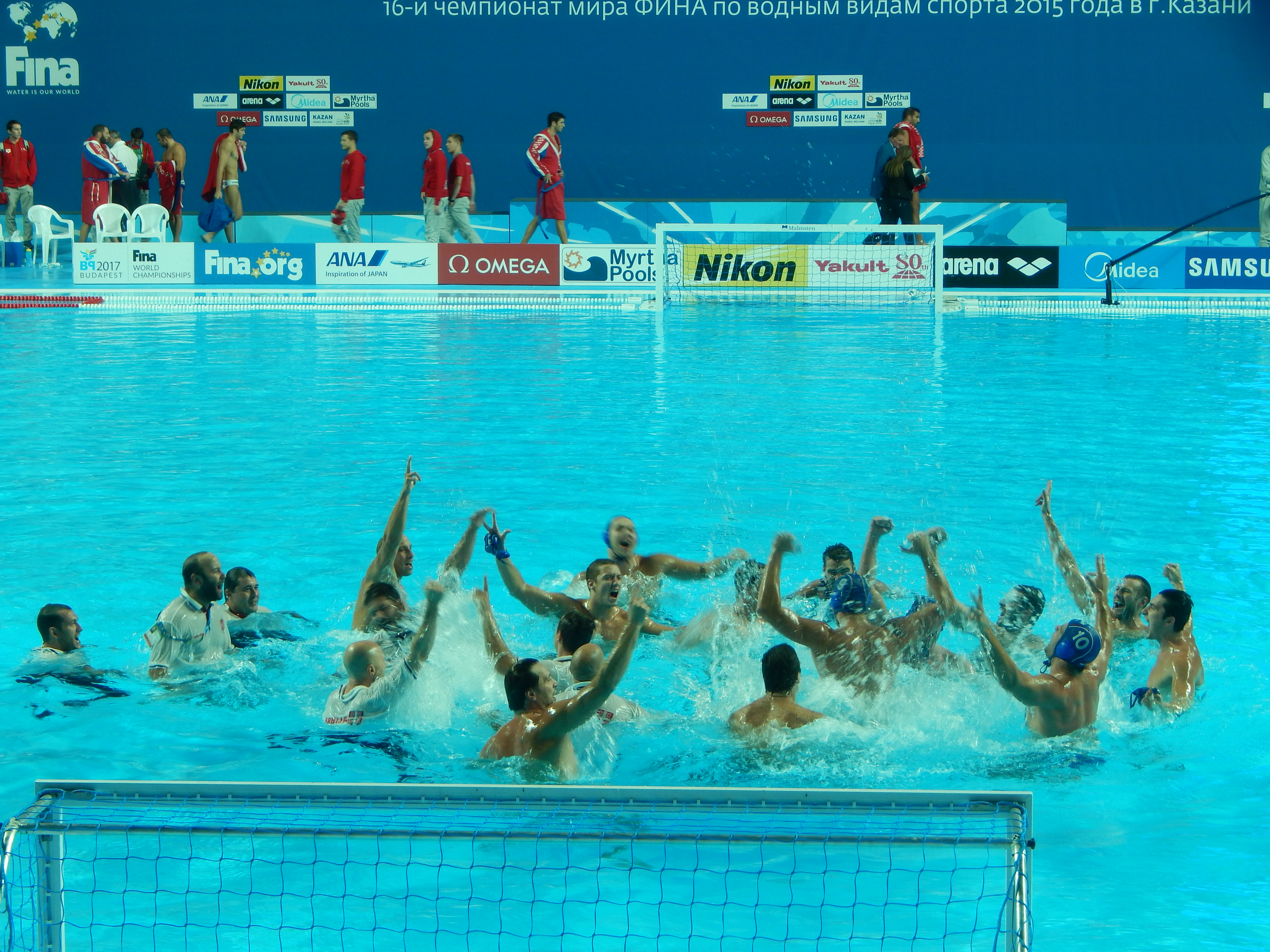
- Team Serbia celebrates after the gold medal match

Tournament details
- Venue: (Russia) Kazan
- Dates: 27 July – 8 August
- Teams: 16 (from 5 confederations)

Final positions
- Champions: Serbia (5th title)
- Runners-up: Croatia
- Third place: Greece
- Fourth place: Italy

Tournament statistics
- Matches played: 48
- Goals scored: 869 (18.1 per match)
- Attendance: 55,994 (1,167 per match)
- Top scorers: (Kazakhstan) Alexandr Axenov (22 goals)

Awards
- Best player: (Serbia) Duško Pijetlović

== Participating teams ==
Africa	Americas	Asia	Europe	Oceania
South Africa	Argentina; Brazil; Canada; United States	China; Japan; Kazakhstan	Croatia; Greece; Hungary; Italy; Montenegro; Russia; Serbia	Australia

=== Groups formed ===
The draw resulted in the following groups:

Group A	Group B	Group C	Group D
Brazil	Greece	Argentina	Australia
Canada	Italy	Hungary	Japan
China	Russia	Kazakhstan	Montenegro
Croatia	United States	South Africa	Serbia

== Format ==
The 16 teams were drawn into four groups of four teams and played a round-robin. The best placed team advanced to the quarterfinal, while the second-and third best team advanced to the playoffs. The last placed team played in placement games for place 13–16. From the quarterfinals on, a knockout system was used to determine the winner. The losers of the playoffs and quarterfinals played in placement games to determine their final position.

== Preliminary round ==
=== Group A ===
Pos	Team	Pld	W	D	L	GF	GA	GD	Pts	Qualification
1	Croatia	3	3	0	0	39	17	+22	6	Advanced to quarterfinals
2	Canada	3	2	0	1	25	20	+5	4	Advanced to playoffs
3	Brazil	3	0	1	2	24	29	−5	1	Advanced to playoffs
4	China	3	0	1	2	12	34	−22	1	

Source: SportResult.com
Rules for classification: 1) points; 2) head-to-head points; 3) head-to-head goal difference; 4) head-to-head number of goals scored; 5) goal difference.

27 July 2015; 09:30	Report	Croatia	12–7	Canada	Kazan; Attendance: 507; Referees: Radosław Koryzna (POL), German Moller (ARG)
27 July 2015; 09:30	Report	Score by quarters: 4–2, 6–2, 1–0, 1–3			Kazan; Attendance: 507; Referees: Radosław Koryzna (POL), German Moller (ARG)
27 July 2015; 09:30	Report	four players 2	Goals	Conway 3	Kazan; Attendance: 507; Referees: Radosław Koryzna (POL), German Moller (ARG)

27 July 2015; 10:45	Report	Brazil	9–9	China	Kazan; Attendance: 700; Referees: Stanko Ivanovski (MNE), Vojin Putniković (SRB)
27 July 2015; 10:45	Report	Score by quarters: 3–4, 2–1, 3–4, 1–0			Kazan; Attendance: 700; Referees: Stanko Ivanovski (MNE), Vojin Putniković (SRB)
27 July 2015; 10:45	Report	Perrone 4	Goals	Dong Tao, Zhang Chufeng 3	Kazan; Attendance: 700; Referees: Stanko Ivanovski (MNE), Vojin Putniković (SRB)

29 July 2015; 20:45	Report	China	2–8	Canada	Kazan; Attendance: 240; Referees: Stanko Ivanovski (MNE), György Kun (HUN)
29 July 2015; 20:45	Report	Score by quarters: 0–3, 0–3, 1–1, 1–1			Kazan; Attendance: 240; Referees: Stanko Ivanovski (MNE), György Kun (HUN)
29 July 2015; 20:45	Report	Tan Feihu 2	Goals	McElroy 3	Kazan; Attendance: 240; Referees: Stanko Ivanovski (MNE), György Kun (HUN)

29 July 2015; 21:30	Report	Croatia	10–9	Brazil	Kazan; Attendance: 230; Referees: Mark Koganov (AZE), Daniel Flahive (AUS)
29 July 2015; 21:30	Report	Score by quarters: 4–2, 4–2, 1–2, 1–3			Kazan; Attendance: 230; Referees: Mark Koganov (AZE), Daniel Flahive (AUS)
29 July 2015; 21:30	Report	Sukno 3	Goals	three players 2	Kazan; Attendance: 230; Referees: Mark Koganov (AZE), Daniel Flahive (AUS)

31 July 2015; 17:30	Report	Croatia	17–1	China	Kazan; Attendance: 874; Referees: Daniel Flahive (AUS), Masoud Rezvani (IRI)
31 July 2015; 17:30	Report	Score by quarters: 4–1, 5–0, 7–0, 1–0			Kazan; Attendance: 874; Referees: Daniel Flahive (AUS), Masoud Rezvani (IRI)
31 July 2015; 17:30	Report	three players 3	Goals	Zhang Chufeng 1	Kazan; Attendance: 874; Referees: Daniel Flahive (AUS), Masoud Rezvani (IRI)

31 July 2015; 20:45	Report	Brazil	6–10	Canada	Kazan; Attendance: 230; Referees: Mark Koganov (AZE), György Kun (HUN)
31 July 2015; 20:45	Report	Score by quarters: 0–3, 3–3, 2–3, 1–1			Kazan; Attendance: 230; Referees: Mark Koganov (AZE), György Kun (HUN)
31 July 2015; 20:45	Report	Silva 2	Goals	Boyd, McElroy 2	Kazan; Attendance: 230; Referees: Mark Koganov (AZE), György Kun (HUN)

=== Group B ===
Pos	Team	Pld	W	D	L	GF	GA	GD	Pts	Qualification
1	Greece	3	3	0	0	37	31	+6	6	Advanced to quarterfinals
2	United States	3	2	0	1	28	26	+2	4	Advanced to playoffs
3	Italy	3	1	0	2	28	28	0	2	Advanced to playoffs
4	Russia	3	0	0	3	23	31	−8	0	

Source: SportResult.com
Rules for classification: 1) points; 2) head-to-head points; 3) head-to-head goal difference; 4) head-to-head number of goals scored; 5) goal difference.

27 July 2015; 12:30	Report	Greece	11–10	Italy	Kazan; Attendance: 883; Referees: Francesc Buch (ESP), György Kun (HUN)
27 July 2015; 12:30	Report	Score by quarters: 4–4, 2–1, 3–2, 2–3			Kazan; Attendance: 883; Referees: Francesc Buch (ESP), György Kun (HUN)
27 July 2015; 12:30	Report	Afroudakis 3	Goals	four players 2	Kazan; Attendance: 883; Referees: Francesc Buch (ESP), György Kun (HUN)

27 July 2015; 18:45	Report	United States	7–6	Russia	Kazan; Attendance: 1,932; Referees: Boris Margeta (SLO), Daniel Flahive (AUS)
27 July 2015; 18:45	Report	Score by quarters: 3–1, 1–2, 2–2, 1–1			Kazan; Attendance: 1,932; Referees: Boris Margeta (SLO), Daniel Flahive (AUS)
27 July 2015; 18:45	Report	Azevedo, Cupido 3	Goals	Bugaychuk 3	Kazan; Attendance: 1,932; Referees: Boris Margeta (SLO), Daniel Flahive (AUS)

29 July 2015; 09:30	Report	Greece	11–10	United States	Kazan; Attendance: 839; Referees: Francesc Buch (ESP), Vojin Putniković (SRB)
29 July 2015; 09:30	Report	Score by quarters: 3–3, 1–3, 4–3, 3–1			Kazan; Attendance: 839; Referees: Francesc Buch (ESP), Vojin Putniković (SRB)
29 July 2015; 09:30	Report	Fountoulis 4	Goals	three players 2	Kazan; Attendance: 839; Referees: Francesc Buch (ESP), Vojin Putniković (SRB)

29 July 2015; 18:00	Report	Russia	6–9	Italy	Kazan; Attendance: 2,350; Referees: Adrian Alexandrescu (ROU), Radosław Koryzna (POL)
29 July 2015; 18:00	Report	Score by quarters: 1–1, 0–5, 3–1, 2–2			Kazan; Attendance: 2,350; Referees: Adrian Alexandrescu (ROU), Radosław Koryzna (POL)
29 July 2015; 18:00	Report	Kholod 3	Goals	Giorgetti 2	Kazan; Attendance: 2,350; Referees: Adrian Alexandrescu (ROU), Radosław Koryzna (POL)

31 July 2015; 18:30	Report	Greece	15–11	Russia	Kazan; Attendance: 2,285; Referees: Adrian Alexandrescu (ROU), Francesc Buch (ESP)
31 July 2015; 18:30	Report	Score by quarters: 5–2, 3–2, 5–3, 2–4			Kazan; Attendance: 2,285; Referees: Adrian Alexandrescu (ROU), Francesc Buch (ESP)
31 July 2015; 18:30	Report	Fountoulis 4	Goals	Nagaev 3	Kazan; Attendance: 2,285; Referees: Adrian Alexandrescu (ROU), Francesc Buch (ESP)

31 July 2015; 21:30	Report	United States	11–9	Italy	Kazan; Attendance: 214; Referees: Boris Margeta (SLO), Nenad Peris (CRO)
31 July 2015; 21:30	Report	Score by quarters: 4–4, 3–2, 2–1, 2–2			Kazan; Attendance: 214; Referees: Boris Margeta (SLO), Nenad Peris (CRO)
31 July 2015; 21:30	Report	Vavić 3	Goals	Di Fulvio 4	Kazan; Attendance: 214; Referees: Boris Margeta (SLO), Nenad Peris (CRO)

=== Group C ===
Pos	Team	Pld	W	D	L	GF	GA	GD	Pts	Qualification
1	Hungary	3	3	0	0	52	13	+39	6	Advanced to quarterfinals
2	Kazakhstan	3	2	0	1	34	24	+10	4	Advanced to playoffs
3	South Africa	3	1	0	2	17	37	−20	2	Advanced to playoffs
4	Argentina	3	0	0	3	17	46	−29	0	

Source: SportResult.com
Rules for classification: 1) points; 2) head-to-head points; 3) head-to-head goal difference; 4) head-to-head number of goals scored; 5) goal difference.

27 July 2015; 13:30	Report	South Africa	10–6	Argentina	Kazan; Attendance: 913; Referees: Masoud Rezvani (IRI), Sergey Naumov (RUS)
27 July 2015; 13:30	Report	Score by quarters: 6–2, 1–2, 1–1, 2–1			Kazan; Attendance: 913; Referees: Masoud Rezvani (IRI), Sergey Naumov (RUS)
27 July 2015; 13:30	Report	E. Le Roux, P. Le Roux 3	Goals	Yañez 3	Kazan; Attendance: 913; Referees: Masoud Rezvani (IRI), Sergey Naumov (RUS)

27 July 2015; 17:30	Report	Hungary	14–5	Kazakhstan	Kazan; Attendance: 1,180; Referees: Joseph Peila (USA), Cory Williams (NZL)
27 July 2015; 17:30	Report	Score by quarters: 4–0, 3–0, 5–2, 2–3			Kazan; Attendance: 1,180; Referees: Joseph Peila (USA), Cory Williams (NZL)
27 July 2015; 17:30	Report	Hárai 4	Goals	Ushakov 2	Kazan; Attendance: 1,180; Referees: Joseph Peila (USA), Cory Williams (NZL)

29 July 2015; 10:25	Report	Kazakhstan	15–7	Argentina	Kazan; Attendance: 1,016; Referees: Nenad Peris (CRO), Hatem Gaber (EGY)
29 July 2015; 10:25	Report	Score by quarters: 5–2, 3–3, 5–1, 2–1			Kazan; Attendance: 1,016; Referees: Nenad Peris (CRO), Hatem Gaber (EGY)
29 July 2015; 10:25	Report	Axenov, Pekovich 4	Goals	Yañez 3	Kazan; Attendance: 1,016; Referees: Nenad Peris (CRO), Hatem Gaber (EGY)

29 July 2015; 12:40	Report	South Africa	4–17	Hungary	Kazan; Attendance: 1,127; Referees: Fabio Toffoli (BRA), Peter de Jong (NED)
29 July 2015; 12:40	Report	Score by quarters: 1–5, 0–3, 2–4, 1–5			Kazan; Attendance: 1,127; Referees: Fabio Toffoli (BRA), Peter de Jong (NED)
29 July 2015; 12:40	Report	Molyneux 2	Goals	Dén. Varga 5	Kazan; Attendance: 1,127; Referees: Fabio Toffoli (BRA), Peter de Jong (NED)

31 July 2015; 09:30	Report	South Africa	3–14	Kazakhstan	Kazan; Attendance: 884; Referees: Fabio Toffoli (BRA), Hatem Gaber (EGY)
31 July 2015; 09:30	Report	Score by quarters: 0–4, 1–3, 1–5, 1–2			Kazan; Attendance: 884; Referees: Fabio Toffoli (BRA), Hatem Gaber (EGY)
31 July 2015; 09:30	Report	three players 1	Goals	Axenov 5	Kazan; Attendance: 884; Referees: Fabio Toffoli (BRA), Hatem Gaber (EGY)

31 July 2015; 10:30	Report	Hungary	21–4	Argentina	Kazan; Attendance: 1,065; Referees: Sergey Naumov (RUS), Peter de Jong (NED)
31 July 2015; 10:30	Report	Score by quarters: 6–2, 3–1, 6–1, 6–0			Kazan; Attendance: 1,065; Referees: Sergey Naumov (RUS), Peter de Jong (NED)
31 July 2015; 10:30	Report	Dén. Varga 5	Goals	López 2	Kazan; Attendance: 1,065; Referees: Sergey Naumov (RUS), Peter de Jong (NED)

=== Group D ===
Pos	Team	Pld	W	D	L	GF	GA	GD	Pts	Qualification
1	Serbia	3	3	0	0	40	26	+14	6	Advanced to quarterfinals
2	Australia	3	1	1	1	24	19	+5	3	Advanced to playoffs
3	Montenegro	3	1	1	1	29	26	+3	3	Advanced to playoffs
4	Japan	3	0	0	3	23	45	−22	0	

Source: SportResult.com
Rules for classification: 1) points; 2) head-to-head points; 3) head-to-head goal difference; 4) head-to-head number of goals scored; 5) goal difference.

27 July 2015; 20:55	Report	Serbia	11–8	Montenegro	Kazan; Attendance: 2,279; Referees: Georgios Stavridis (GRE), Adrian Alexandrescu (ROU)
27 July 2015; 20:55	Report	Score by quarters: 2–1, 4–2, 3–4, 2–1			Kazan; Attendance: 2,279; Referees: Georgios Stavridis (GRE), Adrian Alexandrescu (ROU)
27 July 2015; 20:55	Report	Filipović 3	Goals	three players 2	Kazan; Attendance: 2,279; Referees: Georgios Stavridis (GRE), Adrian Alexandrescu (ROU)

27 July 2015; 21:30	Report	Japan	4–10	Australia	Kazan; Attendance: 2,287; Referees: Massimiliano Caputi (ITA), Hatem Gaber (EGY)
27 July 2015; 21:30	Report	Score by quarters: 0–2, 2–2, 1–3, 1–3			Kazan; Attendance: 2,287; Referees: Massimiliano Caputi (ITA), Hatem Gaber (EGY)
27 July 2015; 21:30	Report	four players 1	Goals	Campbell 3	Kazan; Attendance: 2,287; Referees: Massimiliano Caputi (ITA), Hatem Gaber (EGY)

29 July 2015; 13:45	Report	Australia	5–5	Montenegro	Kazan; Attendance: 313; Referees: Boris Margeta (SLO), Sergey Naumov (RUS)
29 July 2015; 13:45	Report	Score by quarters: 0–2, 1–1, 1–1, 3–1			Kazan; Attendance: 313; Referees: Boris Margeta (SLO), Sergey Naumov (RUS)
29 July 2015; 13:45	Report	Younger 3	Goals	Janović 2	Kazan; Attendance: 313; Referees: Boris Margeta (SLO), Sergey Naumov (RUS)

29 July 2015; 17:30	Report	Serbia	19–9	Japan	Kazan; Attendance: 1,016; Referees: Masoud Rezvani (IRI), Stephane Roy (CAN)
29 July 2015; 17:30	Report	Score by quarters: 2–1, 6–2, 5–3, 6–3			Kazan; Attendance: 1,016; Referees: Masoud Rezvani (IRI), Stephane Roy (CAN)
29 July 2015; 17:30	Report	Nikić 6	Goals	Okawa, Takei 3	Kazan; Attendance: 1,016; Referees: Masoud Rezvani (IRI), Stephane Roy (CAN)

31 July 2015; 12:55	Report	Serbia	10–9	Australia	Kazan; Attendance: 890; Referees: Radosław Koryzna (POL), Georgios Stacridis (GRE)
31 July 2015; 12:55	Report	Score by quarters: 3–2, 2–2, 1–4, 4–1			Kazan; Attendance: 890; Referees: Radosław Koryzna (POL), Georgios Stacridis (GRE)
31 July 2015; 12:55	Report	three players 2	Goals	Younger 3	Kazan; Attendance: 890; Referees: Radosław Koryzna (POL), Georgios Stacridis (GRE)

31 July 2015; 13:30	Report	Japan	10–16	Montenegro	Kazan; Attendance: 640; Referees: Dion Willis (RSA), Massimiliano Caputi (ITA)
31 July 2015; 13:30	Report	Score by quarters: 2–3, 2–5, 2–5, 4–3			Kazan; Attendance: 640; Referees: Dion Willis (RSA), Massimiliano Caputi (ITA)
31 July 2015; 13:30	Report	Takei 4	Goals	Ivović, Radović 4	Kazan; Attendance: 640; Referees: Dion Willis (RSA), Massimiliano Caputi (ITA)

== Knockout stage ==
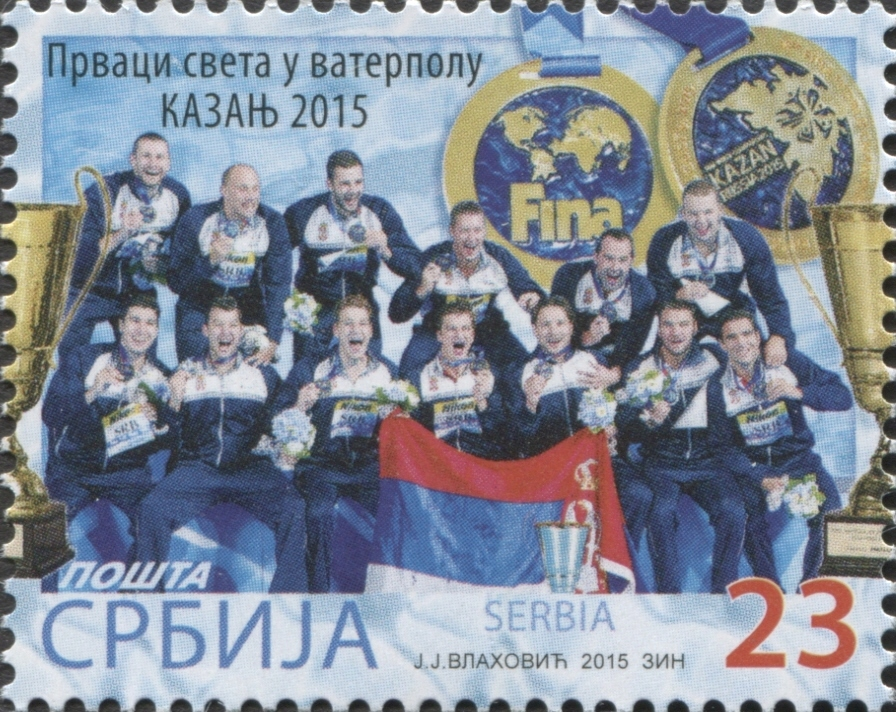
Serbian team with gold medal on a Serbian stamp

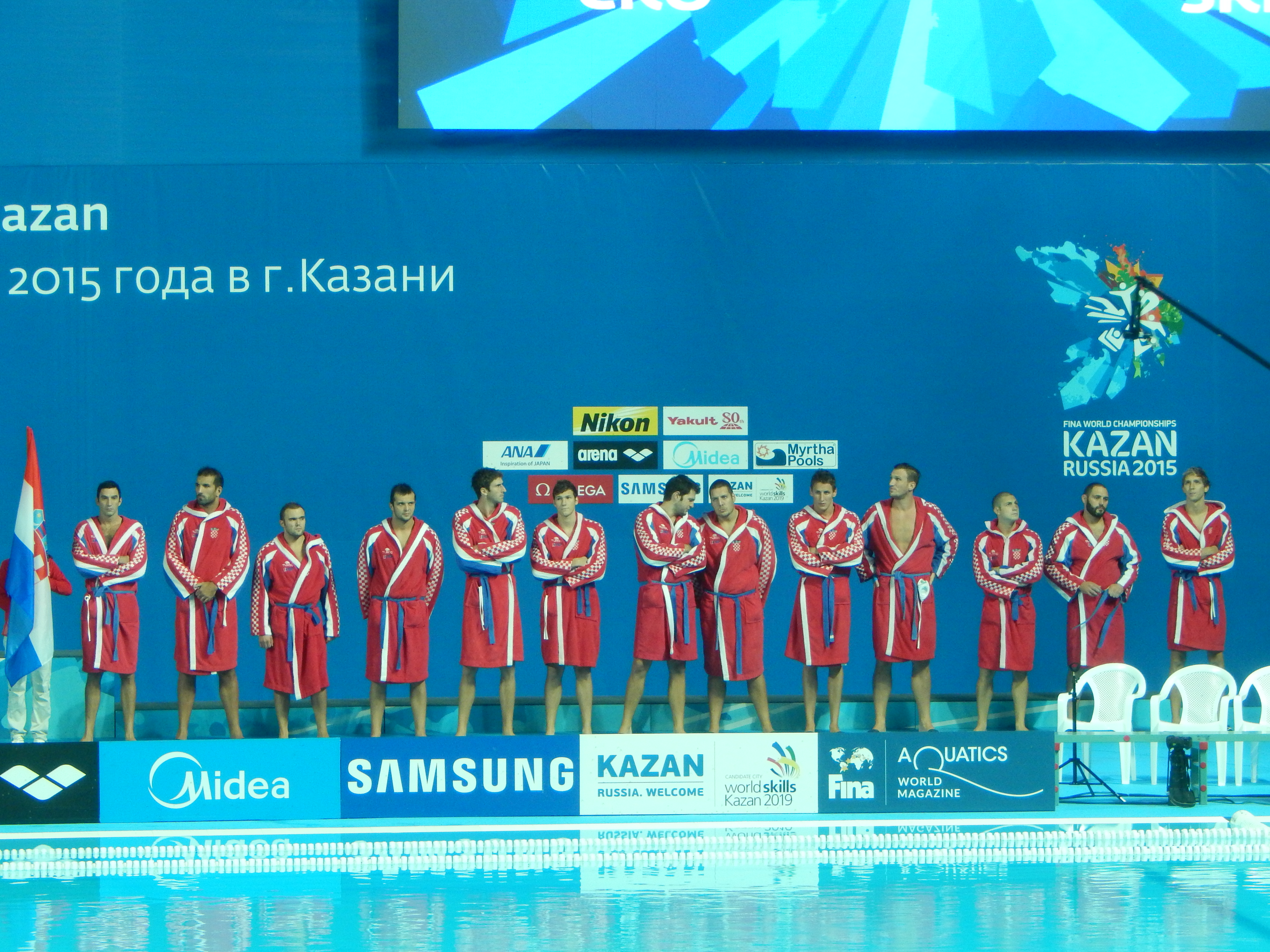
Croatian team won the silver medal

Championship bracket

Playoffs; 2 August
Kazakhstan	8
Montenegro	12
South Africa	1
Australia	17
Canada	2
Italy	8
Brazil	3
United States	7

Quarterfinals; 4 August
Croatia	10
Montenegro	4
Greece (pen.)	7 (5)
Australia	7 (4)
Hungary	7
Italy	8
Serbia	12
United States	7

Semifinals; 6 August
Croatia (pen.)	10 (5)
Greece	10 (3)
Italy	6
Serbia	10

Final; 8 August
Croatia	4
Serbia	11
Third place
Greece (pen.)	7 (4)
Italy	7 (2)

5th place bracket

5th–8th place semifinals
6 August
Montenegro	11
Australia	8
6 August
Hungary	13
United States	9

Fifth place game
8 August
Montenegro	10
Hungary	9
Seventh place game
8 August
Australia	6
United States	10

9th place bracket

9th–12th place semifinals
4 August
Canada	9
Kazakhstan	7
4 August
Brazil	16
South Africa	5

Ninth place game
6 August
Canada (pen.)	7 (5)
Brazil	7 (3)
Eleventh place game
6 August
Kazakhstan	11
South Africa	7

13th place bracket

13th–16th place semifinals
2 August
China	10 (1)
Russia (pen.)	10 (4)
2 August
Argentina	6
Japan	14

13th place game
4 August
Russia	9
Japan	13
15th place game
4 August
China	16
Argentina	9

=== Playoffs ===
2 August 2015; 13:15	Report	Canada	2–8	Italy	Kazan; Attendance: 269; Referees: Mark Koganov (AZE), Francesc Buch (ESP)
2 August 2015; 13:15	Report	Score by quarters: 0–2, 1–1, 1–2, 0–3			Kazan; Attendance: 269; Referees: Mark Koganov (AZE), Francesc Buch (ESP)
2 August 2015; 13:15	Report	Kudaba, Torakis 1	Goals	Giorgetti, Gitto 2	Kazan; Attendance: 269; Referees: Mark Koganov (AZE), Francesc Buch (ESP)

2 August 2015; 17:30	Report	Brazil	3–7	United States	Kazan; Attendance: 2,090; Referees: Boris Margeta (SLO), Adrian Alexandrescu (ROU)
2 August 2015; 17:30	Report	Score by quarters: 0–2, 1–1, 1–1, 1–3			Kazan; Attendance: 2,090; Referees: Boris Margeta (SLO), Adrian Alexandrescu (ROU)
2 August 2015; 17:30	Report	three players 1	Goals	Mann 3	Kazan; Attendance: 2,090; Referees: Boris Margeta (SLO), Adrian Alexandrescu (ROU)

2 August 2015; 18:30	Report	Kazakhstan	8–12	Montenegro	Kazan; Attendance: 2,896; Referees: Joseph Peila (USA), Daniel Flahive (AUS)
2 August 2015; 18:30	Report	Score by quarters: 3–2, 2–3, 1–5, 2–2			Kazan; Attendance: 2,896; Referees: Joseph Peila (USA), Daniel Flahive (AUS)
2 August 2015; 18:30	Report	Gubarev 3	Goals	Brguljan, Janović 3	Kazan; Attendance: 2,896; Referees: Joseph Peila (USA), Daniel Flahive (AUS)

2 August 2015; 15:35	Report	South Africa	1–17	Australia	Kazan; Attendance: 213; Referees: Ni Shi Wei (CHN), German Moller (ARG)
2 August 2015; 15:35	Report	Score by quarters: 1–5, 0–6, 0–2, 0–4			Kazan; Attendance: 213; Referees: Ni Shi Wei (CHN), German Moller (ARG)
2 August 2015; 15:35	Report	E. Le Roux 1	Goals	Younger 4	Kazan; Attendance: 213; Referees: Ni Shi Wei (CHN), German Moller (ARG)

=== Quarterfinals ===
4 August 2015; 17:30	Report	Croatia	10–4	Montenegro	Kazan; Attendance: 1,769; Referees: Radosław Koryzna (POL), Massimiliano Caputi (ITA)
4 August 2015; 17:30	Report	Score by quarters: 1–0, 3–0, 3–3, 3–1			Kazan; Attendance: 1,769; Referees: Radosław Koryzna (POL), Massimiliano Caputi (ITA)
4 August 2015; 17:30	Report	Muslim 3	Goals	Klikovac 3	Kazan; Attendance: 1,769; Referees: Radosław Koryzna (POL), Massimiliano Caputi (ITA)

4 August 2015; 18:30	Report	Greece	7–7 (PSO)	Australia	Kazan; Attendance: 1,996; Referees: Boris Margeta (SLO), Vojin Putniković (SRB)
4 August 2015; 18:30	Report	Score by quarters: 1–0, 1–3, 3–1, 2–3 PSO: 5–4			Kazan; Attendance: 1,996; Referees: Boris Margeta (SLO), Vojin Putniković (SRB)
4 August 2015; 18:30	Report	Fountoulis, Genidounias 2	Goals	Younger 3	Kazan; Attendance: 1,996; Referees: Boris Margeta (SLO), Vojin Putniković (SRB)

4 August 2015; 20:45	Report	Hungary	7–8	Italy	Kazan; Attendance: 693; Referees: Adrian Alexandrescu (ROU), Georgios Stavridis (GRE)
4 August 2015; 20:45	Report	Score by quarters: 2–2, 2–1, 1–2, 2–3			Kazan; Attendance: 693; Referees: Adrian Alexandrescu (ROU), Georgios Stavridis (GRE)
4 August 2015; 20:45	Report	Dán. Varga 3	Goals	Di Fulvio, Luongo 2	Kazan; Attendance: 693; Referees: Adrian Alexandrescu (ROU), Georgios Stavridis (GRE)

4 August 2015; 21:30	Report	Serbia	12–7	United States	Kazan; Attendance: 455; Referees: Francesc Buch (ESP), Nenad Peris (CRO)
4 August 2015; 21:30	Report	Score by quarters: 4–2, 3–3, 2–1, 3–1			Kazan; Attendance: 455; Referees: Francesc Buch (ESP), Nenad Peris (CRO)
4 August 2015; 21:30	Report	Pijetlović 4	Goals	Bonanni 2	Kazan; Attendance: 455; Referees: Francesc Buch (ESP), Nenad Peris (CRO)

=== 13th–16th place semifinals ===
2 August 2015; 10:45	Report	China	10–10 (PSO)	Russia	Kazan; Attendance: 2,263; Referees: Stanko Ivanovski (MNE), Masoud Rezvani (IRI)
2 August 2015; 10:45	Report	Score by quarters: 1–2, 4–4, 2–1, 3–3 PSO: 1–4			Kazan; Attendance: 2,263; Referees: Stanko Ivanovski (MNE), Masoud Rezvani (IRI)
2 August 2015; 10:45	Report	Tan Feihu 4	Goals	four players 2	Kazan; Attendance: 2,263; Referees: Stanko Ivanovski (MNE), Masoud Rezvani (IRI)

2 August 2015; 12:40	Report	Argentina	6–14	Japan	Kazan; Attendance: 218; Referees: Viktor Salnichenko (KAZ), Hatem Gaber (EGY)
2 August 2015; 12:40	Report	Score by quarters: 0–4, 2–2, 2–4, 2–4			Kazan; Attendance: 218; Referees: Viktor Salnichenko (KAZ), Hatem Gaber (EGY)
2 August 2015; 12:40	Report	Carabantes, Demarchi 3	Goals	Takei 4	Kazan; Attendance: 218; Referees: Viktor Salnichenko (KAZ), Hatem Gaber (EGY)

=== 9th–12th place semifinals ===
4 August 2015; 12:40	Report	Canada	9–7	Kazakhstan	Kazan; Attendance: 421; Referees: Stanko Ivanovski (MNE), German Moller (ARG)
4 August 2015; 12:40	Report	Score by quarters: 1–2, 5–0, 2–3, 1–2			Kazan; Attendance: 421; Referees: Stanko Ivanovski (MNE), German Moller (ARG)
4 August 2015; 12:40	Report	Conway 4	Goals	Axenov 3	Kazan; Attendance: 421; Referees: Stanko Ivanovski (MNE), German Moller (ARG)

4 August 2015; 13:35	Report	Brazil	16–5	South Africa	Kazan; Attendance: 213; Referees: Ni Shi Wei (CHN), Hatem Gaber (EGY)
4 August 2015; 13:35	Report	Score by quarters: 7–3, 2–2, 3–0, 4–0			Kazan; Attendance: 213; Referees: Ni Shi Wei (CHN), Hatem Gaber (EGY)
4 August 2015; 13:35	Report	Vrlic 5	Goals	five players 1	Kazan; Attendance: 213; Referees: Ni Shi Wei (CHN), Hatem Gaber (EGY)

=== 5th–8th place semifinals ===
6 August 2015; 15:30	Report	Montenegro	11–8	Australia	Kazan; Attendance: 1,500; Referees: Francesc Buch (ESP), Vojin Putniković (SRB)
6 August 2015; 15:30	Report	Score by quarters: 4–1, 1–1, 4–4, 2–2			Kazan; Attendance: 1,500; Referees: Francesc Buch (ESP), Vojin Putniković (SRB)
6 August 2015; 15:30	Report	Janović 4	Goals	three players 2	Kazan; Attendance: 1,500; Referees: Francesc Buch (ESP), Vojin Putniković (SRB)

6 August 2015; 17:00	Report	Hungary	13–9	United States	Kazan; Attendance: 645; Referees: Massimiliano Caputi (ITA), Sergey Naumov (RUS)
6 August 2015; 17:00	Report	Score by quarters: 4–2, 3–2, 2–2, 4–3			Kazan; Attendance: 645; Referees: Massimiliano Caputi (ITA), Sergey Naumov (RUS)
6 August 2015; 17:00	Report	Hárai 4	Goals	Azevedo, Bonanni 3	Kazan; Attendance: 645; Referees: Massimiliano Caputi (ITA), Sergey Naumov (RUS)

=== Semifinals ===
6 August 2015; 20:30	Report	Croatia	10–10 (PSO)	Greece	Kazan; Attendance: 2,486; Referees: Adrian Alexandrescu (ROU), Daniel Flahive (AUS)
6 August 2015; 20:30	Report	Score by quarters: 3–1, 2–3, 3–2, 2–4 PSO: 5–3			Kazan; Attendance: 2,486; Referees: Adrian Alexandrescu (ROU), Daniel Flahive (AUS)
6 August 2015; 20:30	Report	four players 2	Goals	Vlahopoulos 3	Kazan; Attendance: 2,486; Referees: Adrian Alexandrescu (ROU), Daniel Flahive (AUS)

6 August 2015; 22:00	Report	Italy	6–10	Serbia	Kazan; Attendance: 1,859; Referees: Boris Margeta (SLO), Radosław Koryzna (POL)
6 August 2015; 22:00	Report	Score by quarters: 0–4, 2–4, 2–1, 2–1			Kazan; Attendance: 1,859; Referees: Boris Margeta (SLO), Radosław Koryzna (POL)
6 August 2015; 22:00	Report	Fondelli 2	Goals	S. Mitrovic 3	Kazan; Attendance: 1,859; Referees: Boris Margeta (SLO), Radosław Koryzna (POL)

=== 15th place game ===
4 August 2015; 09:30	Report	China	16–9	Argentina	Kazan; Attendance: 753; Referees: Joseph Peila (USA), Tadao Tahara (JPN)
4 August 2015; 09:30	Report	Score by quarters: 6–2, 3–4, 4–2, 3–1			Kazan; Attendance: 753; Referees: Joseph Peila (USA), Tadao Tahara (JPN)
4 August 2015; 09:30	Report	Dong Tao 4	Goals	Yanez 5	Kazan; Attendance: 753; Referees: Joseph Peila (USA), Tadao Tahara (JPN)

=== 13th place game ===
4 August 2015; 10:30	Report	Russia	9–13	Japan	Kazan; Attendance: 821; Referees: György Kun (HUN), Masoud Rezvani (IRI)
4 August 2015; 10:30	Report	Score by quarters: 4–3, 1–3, 2–5, 2–2			Kazan; Attendance: 821; Referees: György Kun (HUN), Masoud Rezvani (IRI)
4 August 2015; 10:30	Report	Bychkov 3	Goals	Okawa 3	Kazan; Attendance: 821; Referees: György Kun (HUN), Masoud Rezvani (IRI)

=== Eleventh place game ===
6 August 2015; 10:30	Report	Kazakhstan	11–7	South Africa	Kazan; Attendance: 450; Referees: Fabio Toffoli (BRA), Tadao Tahara (JPN)
6 August 2015; 10:30	Report	Score by quarters: 4–2, 1–2, 2–1, 4–2			Kazan; Attendance: 450; Referees: Fabio Toffoli (BRA), Tadao Tahara (JPN)
6 August 2015; 10:30	Report	Axenov 7	Goals	P. Le Roux 3	Kazan; Attendance: 450; Referees: Fabio Toffoli (BRA), Tadao Tahara (JPN)

=== Ninth place game ===
6 August 2015; 12:30	Report	Canada	7–7 (PSO)	Brazil	Kazan; Attendance: 308; Referees: Mark Koganov (AZE), Viktor Salnichenko (KAZ)
6 August 2015; 12:30	Report	Score by quarters: 2–2, 1–1, 2–3, 2–1 PSO: 5–3			Kazan; Attendance: 308; Referees: Mark Koganov (AZE), Viktor Salnichenko (KAZ)
6 August 2015; 12:30	Report	Conway, Kubada 2	Goals	Delgado 3	Kazan; Attendance: 308; Referees: Mark Koganov (AZE), Viktor Salnichenko (KAZ)

=== Seventh place game ===
8 August 2015; 14:00	Report	Australia	6–10	United States	Kazan; Attendance: 1,677; Referees: Nenad Peris (CRO), Francesc Buch (ESP)
8 August 2015; 14:00	Report	Score by quarters: 3–2, 0–2, 1–4, 2–2			Kazan; Attendance: 1,677; Referees: Nenad Peris (CRO), Francesc Buch (ESP)
8 August 2015; 14:00	Report	Younger 2	Goals	Azevedo 4	Kazan; Attendance: 1,677; Referees: Nenad Peris (CRO), Francesc Buch (ESP)

=== Fifth place game ===
8 August 2015; 15:30	Report	Montenegro	10–9	Hungary	Kazan; Attendance: 2,365; Referees: Mark Koganov (AZE), Joseph Peila (USA)
8 August 2015; 15:30	Report	Score by quarters: 2–2, 2–1, 2–2, 4–4			Kazan; Attendance: 2,365; Referees: Mark Koganov (AZE), Joseph Peila (USA)
8 August 2015; 15:30	Report	Ivović 3	Goals	three players 2	Kazan; Attendance: 2,365; Referees: Mark Koganov (AZE), Joseph Peila (USA)

=== Third place game ===
8 August 2015; 20:30	Report	Greece	7–7 (PSO)	Italy	Kazan; Attendance: 2,165; Referees: Adrian Alexandrescu (ROU), Radosław Koryzna (POL)
8 August 2015; 20:30	Report	Score by quarters: 1–0, 2–2, 4–4, 0–1 PSO: 4–2			Kazan; Attendance: 2,165; Referees: Adrian Alexandrescu (ROU), Radosław Koryzna (POL)
8 August 2015; 20:30	Report	Vlahopoulos 3	Goals	Aicardi, Figlioli 2	Kazan; Attendance: 2,165; Referees: Adrian Alexandrescu (ROU), Radosław Koryzna (POL)

=== Final ===
8 August 2015; 22:00	Report	Croatia	4–11	Serbia	Kazan; Attendance: 2,575; Referees: Boris Margeta (SLO), Georgios Stavridis (GRE)
8 August 2015; 22:00	Report	Score by quarters: 2–2, 0–3, 2–2, 0–4			Kazan; Attendance: 2,575; Referees: Boris Margeta (SLO), Georgios Stavridis (GRE)
8 August 2015; 22:00	Report	Sukno 2	Goals	Prlainović 3	Kazan; Attendance: 2,575; Referees: Boris Margeta (SLO), Georgios Stavridis (GRE)

== Final ranking ==
Qualified for the 2016 Olympic Games
Qualified for the 2016 Olympic Games as winner of 2015 World League

Rank	Team
1st place, gold medalist(s)	Serbia
2nd place, silver medalist(s)	Croatia
3rd place, bronze medalist(s)	Greece
4	Italy
5	Montenegro
6	Hungary
7	United States
8	Australia
9	Canada
10	Brazil
11	Kazakhstan
12	South Africa
13	Japan
14	Russia
15	China
16	Argentina

2015 FINA Men's World champions

Serbia
Fifth title

Team Roster

Gojko Pijetlović, Dušan Mandić, Živko Gocić, Radomir Drašović, Miloš Ćuk, Duško Pijetlović, Slobodan Nikić, Milan Aleksić, Nikola Jakšić, Filip Filipović, Andrija Prlainović, Stefan Mitrović, Branislav Mitrović
Head coach: Dejan Savić.

== Medalists ==
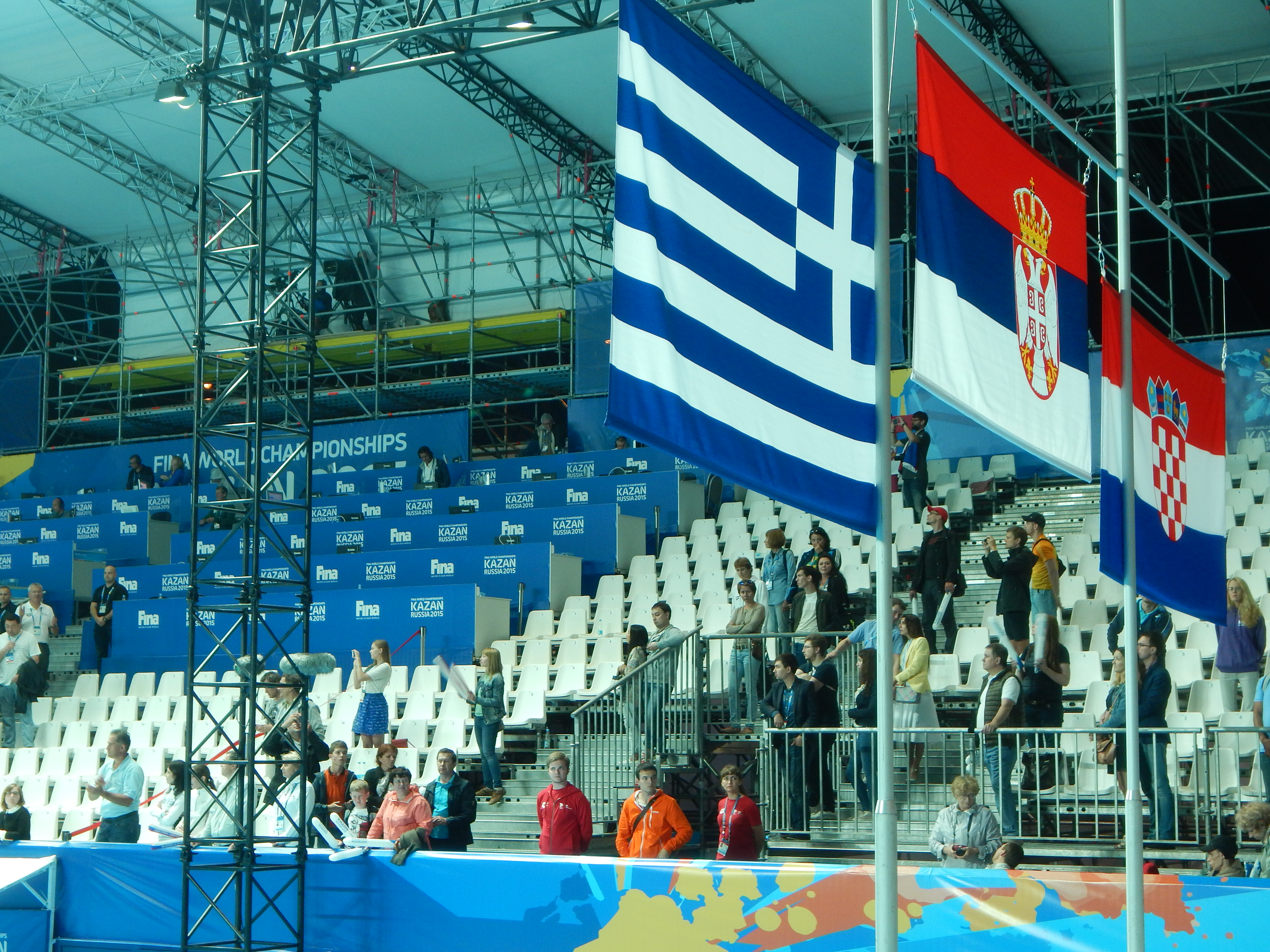
Top three flag ceremony

Gold	Silver	Bronze
Serbia Gojko Pijetlović; Dušan Mandić; Živko Gocić (c); Sava Ranđelović; Miloš Ćuk; Duško Pijetlović; Slobodan Nikić; Milan Aleksić; Nikola Jakšić; Filip Filipović; Andrija Prlainović; Stefan Mitrović; Branislav Mitrović Head coach: Dejan Savić	Croatia Josip Pavić (c); Damir Burić; Antonio Petković; Luka Lončar; Maro Joković; Luka Bukić; Petar Muslim; Andro Bušlje; Sandro Sukno; Fran Paškvalin; Anđelo Šetka; Paulo Obradović; Marko Bijač Head coach: Ivica Tucak	Greece Konstantinos Flegkas; Emmanouil Mylonakis; Georgios Dervisis; Konstantinos Genidounias; Ioannis Fountoulis; Kyriakos Pontikeas; Christos Afroudakis (c); Evangelos Delakas; Konstantinos Mourikis; Christodoulos Kolomvos; Alexandros Gounas; Angelos Vlachopoulos; Stefanos Galanopoulos Head coach: Thodoris Vlachos

== Individual awards ==
Most Valuable Player

- (Serbia) Duško Pijetlović

Best Goalscorer

- (Kazakhstan) Alexandr Axenov – 22 goals

All-Tournament Team

- (Croatia) Josip Pavić
- (Serbia) Duško Pijetlović
- (Italy) Francesco Di Fulvio
- (Greece) Ioannis Fountoulis
- (Croatia) Petar Muslim
- (Kazakhstan) Alexandr Axenov
- (Australia) Aaron Younger
