= Konstantine Gegelashvili =

Georgian water polo player

Personal information
- Nationality: Georgian
- Born: 7 May 1983 (age 43)
- Height: 1.85 m (6 ft 1 in)
- Weight: 94 kg (207 lb)

Sport
- Sport: Water polo
- Handedness: Right
- Position: Centre forward
- Current club: VK Locomotive Tbilisi

Konstantine Gegelashvili (born 7 May 1983) is a Georgian water polo player for VK Locomotive Tbilisi and the Georgian national team.

He participated at the 2018 Men's European Water Polo Championship.
