= Francisco Fernández (water polo) =

Spanish water polo player (born 1986)

Personal information
- Full name: Francisco Fernández Miranda
- Nickname: Fran
- Born: 21 June 1986 (age 40) Madrid, Spain
- Height: 185 cm (6 ft 1 in)
- Weight: 84 kg (185 lb)

Sport
- Sport: Water polo
Medal record
Men's water polo
Representing Spain
European Championship
Silver medal – second place	2018 Barcelona	Team
Silver medal – second place	2020 Budapest	Team
Mediterranean Games
Silver medal – second place	2013 Mersin	Team

Francisco Fernández Miranda (Note: In this Spanish name, the first or paternal surname is Fernández and the second or maternal family name is Miranda.) (born 21 June 1986) is a Spanish former water polo player. He was part of the Spanish team at the 2016 Summer Olympics, where the team finished in seventh place.

== See also ==
- List of World Aquatics Championships medalists in water polo
