= Ricard Alarcón =

Spanish water polo player (born 1991)

Personal information
- Born: 18 August 1991 (age 34)
- Height: 186 cm (6 ft 1 in)
- Weight: 110 kg (243 lb)

Sport
- Sport: Water polo
- Club: CN Terrassa
Medal record
Representing Spain
Mediterranean Games
Silver medal – second place	2013 Mersin	Team competition

Ricard Alarcón Tevar (born 18 August 1991) is a Spanish water polo player. He was part of the Spanish team at the 2016 Summer Olympics, where the team finished in seventh place.
