= Antonio Machoni =

Italian Jesuit, linguist, and cartographer

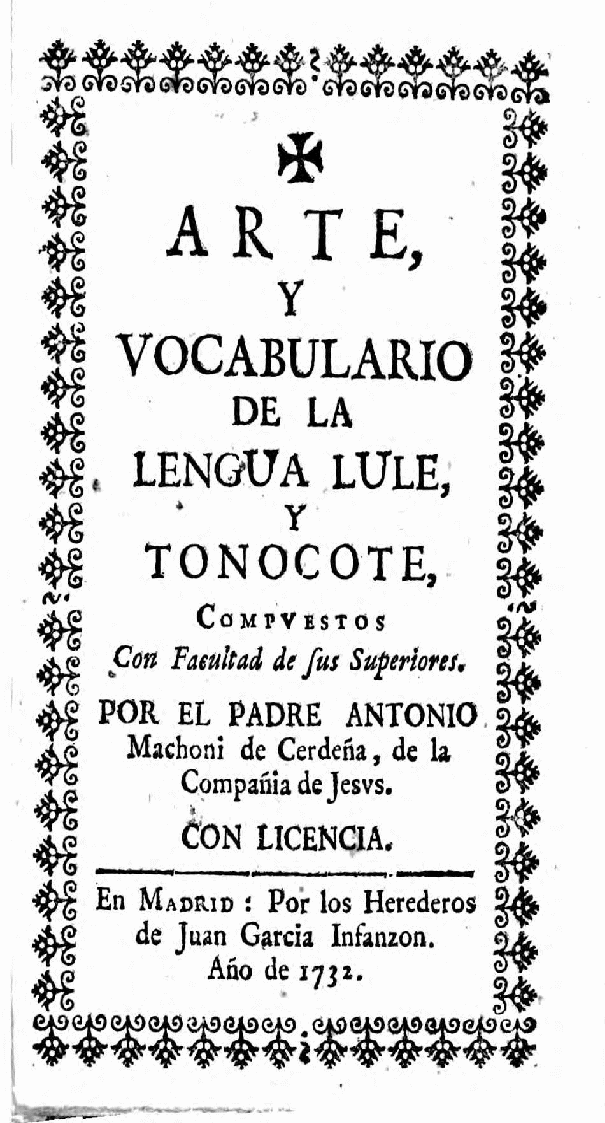

Antonio Machoni (alternatively Maccioni, Machony or Macioni; born 10 October 1671 in Iglesias, Sardinia; died 25 July 1753 in Córdoba, Tucumán) was an Italian Jesuit, linguist and cartographer.
