= Konstantinos Tsalkanis =

Greek water polo player

Personal information
- Born: 23 April 1982 (age 44)
- Height: 185 cm (6 ft 1 in)

Sport
- Country: Greece
- Sport: water polo
Medal record
Representing Greece
Mediterranean Games
Bronze medal – third place	2013 Mersin	Team competition
- Updated on 15 September 2015

Konstantinos Tsalkanis (born 23 April 1982) is a male water polo goalkeeper from Greece. He was part of the Greece men's national water polo team at the 2013 World Aquatics Championships in Barcelona, Spain, where they finished in 6th place.

== See also ==
- Greece at the 2013 World Aquatics Championships
