= Konstantinos Gouvis =

Greek water polo player

Personal information
- Born: 10 March 1994 (age 32) Heraklion, Greece
- Height: 187 cm (6 ft 2 in)
- Weight: 101 kg (223 lb)

Sport
- Country: Greece
- Sport: water polo
- Team: Olympiacos
Medal record
Representing Greece
World Championships
Bronze medal – third place	2022 Budapest	Team
FINA World League
Bronze medal – third place	2020 Tbilisi	Team
Mediterranean Games
Bronze medal – third place	2013 Mersin	Team
- Updated on 15 September 2015

Konstantinos Gouvis (born 10 March 1994 in Heraklion) is a male former water polo player from Greece. He won with the Greek team the bronze medal at the 2013 Mediterranean Games. He was part of the Greek team at the 2013 World Aquatics Championships in Barcelona, Spain, where they finished in 6th place. He played for Olympiacos.

== Honours ==
N.O. Vouliagmeni

- National Cup of Greece (1): 2016–17

== See also ==
- Greece at the 2013 World Aquatics Championships
