= Emmanouil Mylonakis =

Greek water polo player

Manolis Mylonakis
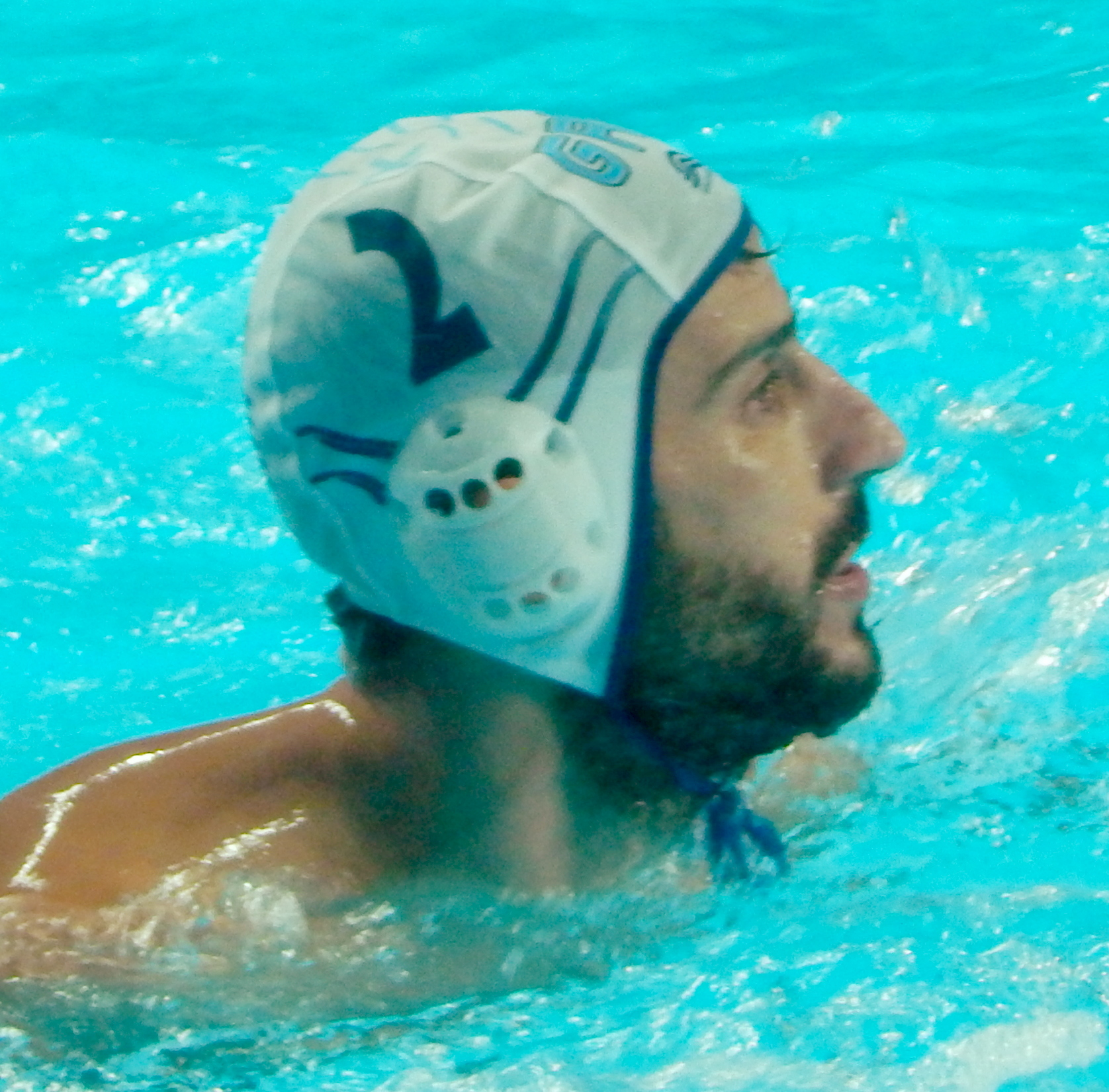

Personal information
- Born: 9 April 1985 (age 41) Greece
- Height: 185 cm (6 ft 1 in)
- Weight: 75 kg (165 lb)

Sport
- Country: Greece
- Sport: Water polo
- Club: Vouliagmeni
Medal record
Men's water polo
Representing Greece
World Championships
Bronze medal – third place	2005 Montreal	Team
Bronze medal – third place	2015 Kazan	Team
FINA World League
Bronze medal – third place	2016 Huizhou	Team
Mediterranean Games
Bronze medal – third place	2013 Mersin	Team
- Updated on 12 January 2017

Emmanouil "Manolis" Mylonakis (born 9 April 1985) is a Greek former water polo player who competed in the 2008 Summer Olympics and 2012 Summer Olympics. He was also a member of the team that competed for Greece at the 2016 Summer Olympics. They finished in 6th place.

He plays for Greek powerhouse Olympiacos, with whom he won the 2017–18 LEN Champions League. His sister Anthoula Mylonaki was also a Water Polo Olympian, winning a silver medal with Greece in 2004.

Titles

9 Greek Championships

10 Greek Cups

1 Greek Super Cup

1 LEN Champions League

== See also ==
- Greece men's Olympic water polo team records and statistics
- List of World Aquatics Championships medalists in water polo
