= Nikoloz Shubladze =

Georgian water polo player

Personal information
- Nationality: Georgian
- Born: 27 December 1993 (age 32)
- Height: 1.90 m (6 ft 3 in)
- Weight: 95 kg (209 lb)

Sport
- Sport: Water polo
- Handedness: Right
- Position: Goalkeeper
- Current club: VK Primorac Kotor

Senior clubs
- Years: Team
- VK Primorac Kotor
National team
- Years: Team
- (Georgia (country)) Georgia

Nikoloz Shubladze (born 27 December 1993) is a Georgian water polo player for VK Primorac Kotor and the Georgian national team.

He participated at the 2018 Men's European Water Polo Championship.
