= Nikola Vukčević (water polo) =

Montenegrin water polo player

Personal information
- Born: 1985 (age 40–41) Herceg Novi
- Height: 198 cm (6 ft 6 in)
- Weight: 106 kg (234 lb)
Medal record
Men's water polo
Representing Serbia and Montenegro
Mediterranean Games
Bronze medal – third place	2005 Almería	Team competition
Representing Montenegro
European Championship
Gold medal – first place	2008 Málaga	Team competition
Silver medal – second place	2016 Belgrade	Team Competition
FINA World League
Bronze medal – third place	2013 Chelyabinsk	Team competition

Nikola Vukčević (Serbian Cyrillic: Никола Вукчевић) is a Montenegrin water polo player He is a member of the Montenegro men's national water polo team at the 2008 Summer Olympics. The team reached the semifinals, where they were defeated by Hungary and met Serbia in the bronze medal match. He was also the member of the Montenegro men's national water polo team in 2012 Summer Olympics where Montenegro finished 4th. He plays for AEK Athens.
