= Kyriakos Pontikeas =

Greek water polo player (born 1991)

Personal information
- Born: 9 May 1991 (age 35) Greece
- Height: 192 cm (6 ft 4 in)
- Weight: 84 kg (185 lb)
Medal record
Men's water polo
Representing Greece
World Championships
Bronze medal – third place	2015 Kazan	Team
FINA World League
Bronze medal – third place	2016 Huizhou	Team
Mediterranean Games
Bronze medal – third place	2013 Mersin	Team
- Updated on 12 January 2017

Kyriakos Pontikeas (born 9 May 1991) is a water polo player of Greece. As a member of the Greek team, he won the bronze medal at the 2015 World Aquatics Championships.

He was a member of the team that competed for Greece at the 2016 Summer Olympics. They finished in 6th place.

He plays for Greek powerhouse Olympiacos.

== See also ==
- List of World Aquatics Championships medalists in water polo
