= Stefanos Galanopoulos =

Greek water polo player

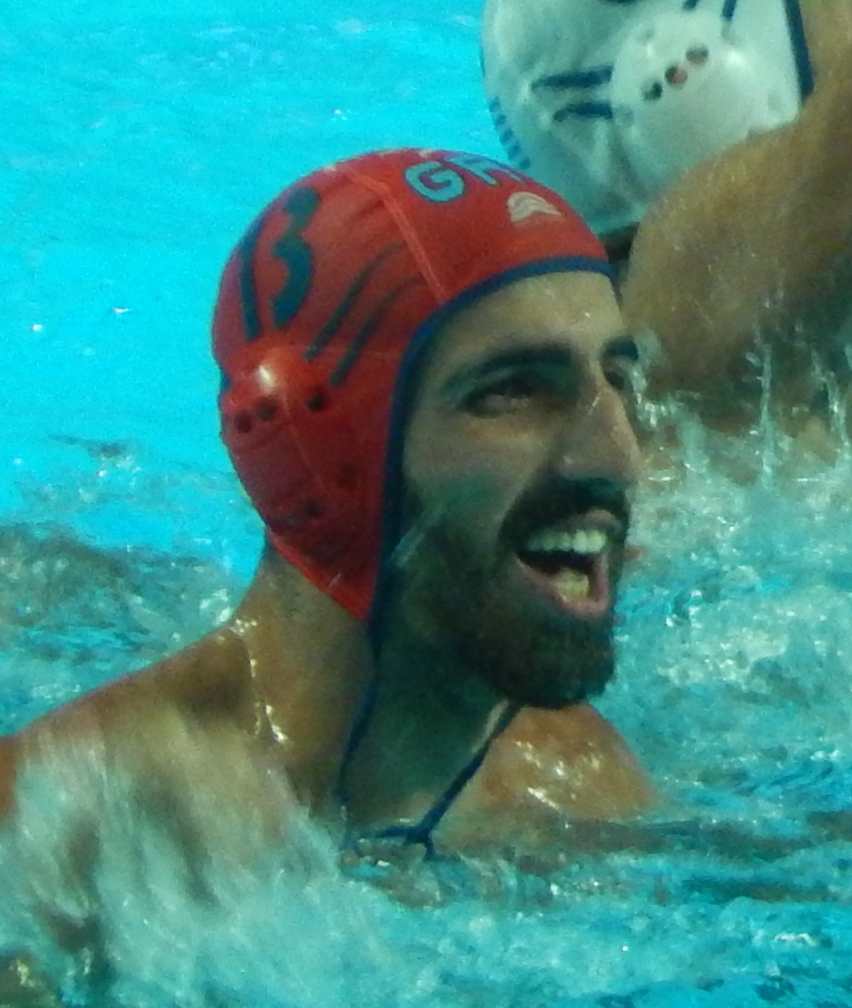

Personal information
- Born: 22 February 1993 (age 33) Greece
- Height: 197 cm (6 ft 6 in)
- Weight: 89 kg (196 lb)

Sport
- Country: Greece
- Sport: Water polo
- Club: Olympiacos
Medal record
Men's water polo
Representing Greece
World Championships
Bronze medal – third place	2015 Kazan	Team
FINA World League
Bronze medal – third place	2016 Huizhou	Team
- Updated on 12 January 2017

Stefanos Galanopoulos (born 22 February 1993) is a water polo player of Greece. He was part of the Greek team winning the bronze medal at the 2015 World Aquatics Championships.

He was a member of the team that competed for Greece at the 2016 Summer Olympics. They finished in 6th place.

He plays for Greek powerhouse Olympiacos, with whom he won the 2017–18 LEN Champions League in Genoa.

== See also ==
- Greece men's Olympic water polo team records and statistics
- List of men's Olympic water polo tournament goalkeepers
- List of World Aquatics Championships medalists in water polo
