= Enzo Khasz =

French water polo player (born 1993)

Personal information
- Born: 13 August 1993 (age 33)
- Height: 203 cm (6 ft 8 in)
- Weight: 105 kg (231 lb)

Sport
- Sport: Water polo
- Club: CN Marseille

Enzo Khasz (born 13 August 1993) is a water polo player from France. He was part of the French team at the 2016 Summer Olympics, where the team was eliminated in the group stage.
