= Marcel Spilliaert =

French water polo player (1924–1992)

Personal information
- Nationality: French
- Born: 4 November 1924 Tourcoing, France
- Died: 17 October 1992 (aged 67) Montpellier, France

Sport
- Sport: Water polo

Senior clubs
- Years: Team
- –: EN Tourcoing
- –: Tourcoing
National team
- Years: Team
- ?-?: France

Marcel Spilliaert (4 November 1924 – 17 October 1992) was a French male water polo player. He was a member of the France men's national water polo team. He competed with the team at the 1948 Summer Olympics.
