= Mislav Vrlić =

Croatian water polo player

Personal information
- Nationality: Croatian
- Born: 4 April 1996 (age 30) Rijeka, Croatia
- Height: 1.99 m (6 ft 6 in)
- Weight: 110 kg (243 lb)

Sport
- Country: Croatia
- Sport: Water polo
- Club: VK Primorje

Mislav Vrlić (born 4 April 1996) is a Croatian professional water polo player. He is currently playing for VK Primorje. He is 6 ft 6 in (1.99 m) tall and weighs 243 lb (110 kg). He started playing water polo at the age of 6. His older brother Josip is also water polo player.
