= Fran Čubranić =

Croatian water polo player

Personal information
- Nationality: Croatian
- Born: 11 June 1997 (age 29) Rijeka, Croatia
- Height: 1.90 m (6 ft 3 in)
- Weight: 95 kg (209 lb)

Sport
- Country: Croatia
- Sport: Water polo
- Club: VK Primorje

Fran Čubranić (born 11 June 1997) is a Croatian professional water polo player. He is currently playing for VK Primorje. He is 6 ft 3 in (1.90 m) tall and weighs 209 lb (95 kg).
