= AEK (men's water polo) =

Greek water polo club from Athens

AEK Water Polo
- Founded: 1962; 2017 (re-establishment)
- League: A2 Ethniki Water Polo
- Based in: Athens, Greece
- Colors
- President: Alexis Alexiou
- Head coach: George Nikolaou
- Website: aek.gr

AEK Men's Water Polo Club is the men's water polo department of the major Greek multi-sport club, AEK Sports Club, based in Athens, Greece. The club's home ground is in Athens. It was founded in 1962 and after its dissolution in the '70s, it was re-established in 2017.

== History ==
The water polo department of AEK was first founded in 1962 and maintained until the early 1970s. During its first season, they won two Third Division Championships. In 1963, AEK was fourth in the Third Division Championship, in the same position in 1964, third in 1965 and champion in 1966, to compete for the following year 1967 in the Second Division where they finished sixth and relegated.

Champion again in 1968 in the Third Division, they did not play in the 1969 championship of the A2 Greek Water Polo League and so, somewhere there, the thread of that team is lost. The department was re-established in 2017. The decision to re-establish the department by the Board of AEK Sports Club was received on March 23, 2017, after the proposal made by Panos Michalopoulos and Giorgos Kirmizoglou, something that was officially announced after a while.

On 6 July 2020, the club was promoted to the Greek Water Polo League for the first time in its history. In 2021 the club participated in the first Greek Cup final of its short history and lost the game against Olympiacos.

== Honours ==
AEK Men's Water Polo honours aek.gr
Type	Competition	Titles	Winners	Runners-up
Domestic	A2 Greek Men's Water Polo League	1	2020	
Domestic	Greek Men's Water Polo C League	3	1966, 1968, 2018	
Domestic	Greek Water Polo Cup	0		2021

- record
- ^{S} Shared record

== Current squad ==
Season 2022–23

№	Nat.	Player	Birth Date	Position	L/R
1	(Greece)	Michalis Tsatalios	July 17, 1988 (age 37)		
2	(Greece)	Anargyros Koryzis		Goalkeeper	
3	(Greece)	Michalis Kazazis	February 5, 1994 (age 32)	Centre Back	
4	(Greece)	Aris Mavrotas	September 5, 2000 (age 25)	Wing	
6	(Greece)	Konstantinos Papakos		Wing	
7	(Greece)	Rafail Manioudakis		Wing	
8	(Greece)	Dimitris Stamelos	March 30, 2001 (age 25)	Wing	
9	(Greece)	Christos Papoukas		Wing	
10	(Greece)	Nikolaos Stellatos	June 17, 1979 (age 47)	Wing	
11	(Greece)	Michalis Diplaros		Wing	
12	(Greece)	Xenofon Zorzos	October 18, 2002 (age 23)	Centre Forward	
13	(Greece)	Lefteris Katsinoulas	June 11, 2002 (age 24)	Goalkeeper	
14	(Montenegro)	Nikola Vukčević	November 14, 1985 (age 40)	Centre Forward	
16	(Greece)	Alexandros Iliopoulos		Wing	
17	(Greece)	Manolis Tsistrakis		Wing	
	(Greece)	Konstantinos Kokkinakis	October 9, 1975 (age 50)	Centre Back	
	(United States)	Luis Araya	July 7, 1998 (age 27)	Wing	

=== Staff ===
Technical Staff
Section Chairman	(Greece) Alexis Alexiou
Section Leader	(Greece) Panos Michalopoulos
Technical Manager	(Greece) Giorgos Kirmizoglou
Head Coach	(Greece) Konstantinos Dandolos
Technical Director	(Greece) Vasilios Davillas

== See also ==
- AEK Women's Water Polo Club

== Sponsorships ==
- Great Sponsor: Molto
