= Luka Bajić =

Croatian water polo player (born 2000)

Personal information
- Nationality: Croatian
- Born: 25 April 2000 (age 26) Croatia
- Height: 1.94 m (6 ft 4 in)
- Weight: 98 kg (216 lb)

Sport
- Country: Switzerland
- Sport: Water polo
- Club: HAVK Mladost Anzio waterpolis

Luka Bajić (born April 25, 2000) is a Croatian professional water polo player. He is currently playing for HAVK Mladost. He is 6 ft 6 in (1.98 m) tall and weighs 216 lb (98 kg).
