= Balázs Szirányi Somogyi =

Spanish water polo player (born 1983)

Balazs Sziranyi
Personal information
- Full name: Balazs Marton Sziranyi Somogyi
- Nationality: Spanish
- Born: 10 January 1983 (age 43) Budapest, Hungary
- Height: 196 cm (77 in)
- Weight: 108 kg (238 lb)

Sport
- Sport: Water polo
- Handedness: R
- Position: Centre forward
- Number: 7
National team
- Years: Team
- 2012-2016: Spain

Balazs Marton Sziranyi Somogyi (born 1983 in Budapest in Hungary) is a Spanish water polo player. At the 2012 Summer Olympics, he competed for the Spain men's national water polo team in the men's event. He is 6 ft 5 inches tall.
