= Marko Martinić =

Croatian water polo player

Personal information
- Nickname: Marta
- Nationality: Croat
- Born: June 18, 1990 (age 36) Zagreb, Croatia
- Height: 183 cm (6 ft 0 in)

Boxing career

Marko Martinić (born June 18, 1990) is a Croatian water polo player.

== Early years ==
He was born in Zagreb and grew up in Srednjaci, a neighborhood in Zagreb close to HAVK Mladost. When he was 5 years old he started training swimming, but at the age of 10 he switched to water polo. Very early he joined the national team and became the captain of the Croatian junior national team.

== Water polo career ==
He started training water polo in HAVK Mladost, club with the most trophies in the world. At the age of 16 he joined Mladost's senior squad and won the Croatian national championship in the season of 2007/2008. In the 2010/2011 season he went on loan to VK Medveščak and ended the season as the fourth best scorer (23 goals) in the Adriatic Water polo League. As the best Medveščak player, in the season 2011/2012 he contributed to the historical success of the club, the Eurocup quarter finals, as he scored 27 goals in the competition. In 2012/2013 season he returned to HAVK Mladost, a season in which they ranked #3 in the Adriatic Water polo League.

Having taken Macedonian citizenship in 2012, he played for the national team of Macedonia in qualifying rounds for Olympic Games in London 2012.

- Playing for Croatian national team:
  - U17 LEN Trophy (2006) - gold
  - U18 European Water Polo Championship, Malta (2007) - bronze
  - U19 European Water Polo Championship, Istanbul (2008) - fifth place
  - U20 European Water Polo Championship, Crete (2009) - gold
