= Olympiacos SFP (men's water polo) =

Men's water polo department of the major Greek multi-sport club, Olympiacos SFP

Olympiacos Water Polo
- Nickname: Thrylos (The Legend); Erythrolefkoi (The Red-Whites)
- Founded: 1925
- League: A1 Ethniki Water Polo; LEN Champions League
- Based in: Piraeus, Greece
- Arena: Papastrateio Pool Piraeus (Capacity: 1000)
- Colors: Red, White
- President: Michalis Kountouris
- Head coach: Elvis Fatovic
- Championships: 2 LEN Champions Leagues; 1 LEN Super Cup; 2 Quadruple Crowns; 40 Greek Leagues; 27 Greek Cups; 5 Greek Super Cups
- Website: olympiacossfp.gr

Olympiacos Men's Waterpolo (Greek: Ολυμπιακός, [olimbiaˈkos]), commonly referred to as Olympiacos, Olympiacos Piraeus or with its full name as Olympiacos CFP, is the professional men's water polo department of the major Greek multi-sport club, Olympiacos CFP, based in Piraeus, Greece. The department was founded in 1925, one of the founding members of the Hellenic Swimming Federation, and their home ground is the Papastrateio Pool in Piraeus.

Olympiacos is one of the most successful teams in Europe and a traditional powerhouse of continental water polo, having won 2 LEN Champions Leagues (2001–02, 2017–18), 1 LEN Super Cup (2002) and 2 Triple Crowns (2002, 2018), the only Greek club to have been crowned European Champions. They have also been six times runners-up (counting nine European finals overall), three in the LEN Champions League (2000–01, 2015–16, 2018–19), two in the LEN Cup Winners' Cup (1997–98, 1998–99) and one more in the LEN Super Cup (2018). In 2001–02, Olympiacos became the first club ever in waterpolo history to win all four competitions they claimed (LEN Champions League, LEN Super Cup, Greek League and Greek Cup), completing a Continental Quadruple. They won their second Continental Quadruple in 2017–18 season (LEN Champions League, Greek League, Greek Cup, Greek Super Cup). After the 2014–15 LEN Euro League win of the women's department, parent club Olympiacos CFP became the second sports club in continental waterpolo history to have been crowned European Champions with both its men's and women's teams and the only one in Europe with both these departments currently active.

Domestically, Olympiacos is the most titled club in Greek water polo history, as the club's 67 domestic titles (71 overall) are the most out of any Greek club. They have won 40 League titles, a record 26 Cups, a record 5 Super Cups and a record 23 Doubles. They are the dominant force since 1992, having set a number of records including a winning streak of 163 straight wins in both the Greek League's regular season and play-offs, which lasted from May 2013 to May 2019. The men's waterpolo department receives great support from the club's large fanbase, as Olympiacos is the most popular sports club in Greece.

Some players who have played for Olympiacos over the years include: Filip Filipović, Gergő Zalánki, Josip Pavić, Maro Joković, Kostas Kakaris, Giannis Fountoulis, Loren Fatović, Andro Bušlje, Márton Vámos, Paulo Obradović, Marko Bijac, Luka Lončar, Konstantin Kharkov, Thodoris Chatzitheodorou, Alexandros Papanastasiou, Stelios Argyropoulos, Petar Trbojević, Slobodan Nikić, Stefan Mitrović, Ivan Buljubašić, Konstantinos Mourikis, Teo Đogaš, Mlađan Janović, Nikola Rađen, Dániel Angyal, Dimitris Nikolaidis, Makis Voltirakis, Antonis Vlontakis, Nikos Deligiannis, Thodoris Kalakonas, Themis Chatzis, Giannis Thomakos, Giorgos Psychos, Sakis Platanitis, Dimitris Kravaritis, Dimitris Skoumpakis, Vangelis Delakas, Manolis Mylonakis, Tasos Schizas, Giorgos Afroudakis, Christos Afroudakis, Giorgos Doskas, Kyriakos Giannopoulos, Nikos Venetopoulos, Chris Humbert, Gavin Arroyo, Albert Español, Jesse Smith, Andrija Komadina, Blai Mallarach, Manolis Zerdevas, Christodoulos Kolomvos, Angelos Vlachopoulos, Dimitris Mazis, Alexandros Gounas, Giorgos Dervisis and Konstantinos Genidounias. Such players, under the guidance of coaches like Nikola Stamenić, Zoltán Kásás, Boris Popov, Dragan Matutinović, Mile Nakić, Thodoris Vlachos, Igor Milanović and Elvis Fatović have made Olympiacos one of the most successful teams in European water polo the last 25 years (only Pro Recco, Jug and Posillipo have won more LEN Champions League titles than Olympiacos since 1993).

== History ==
=== 1925–1945: Early years ===
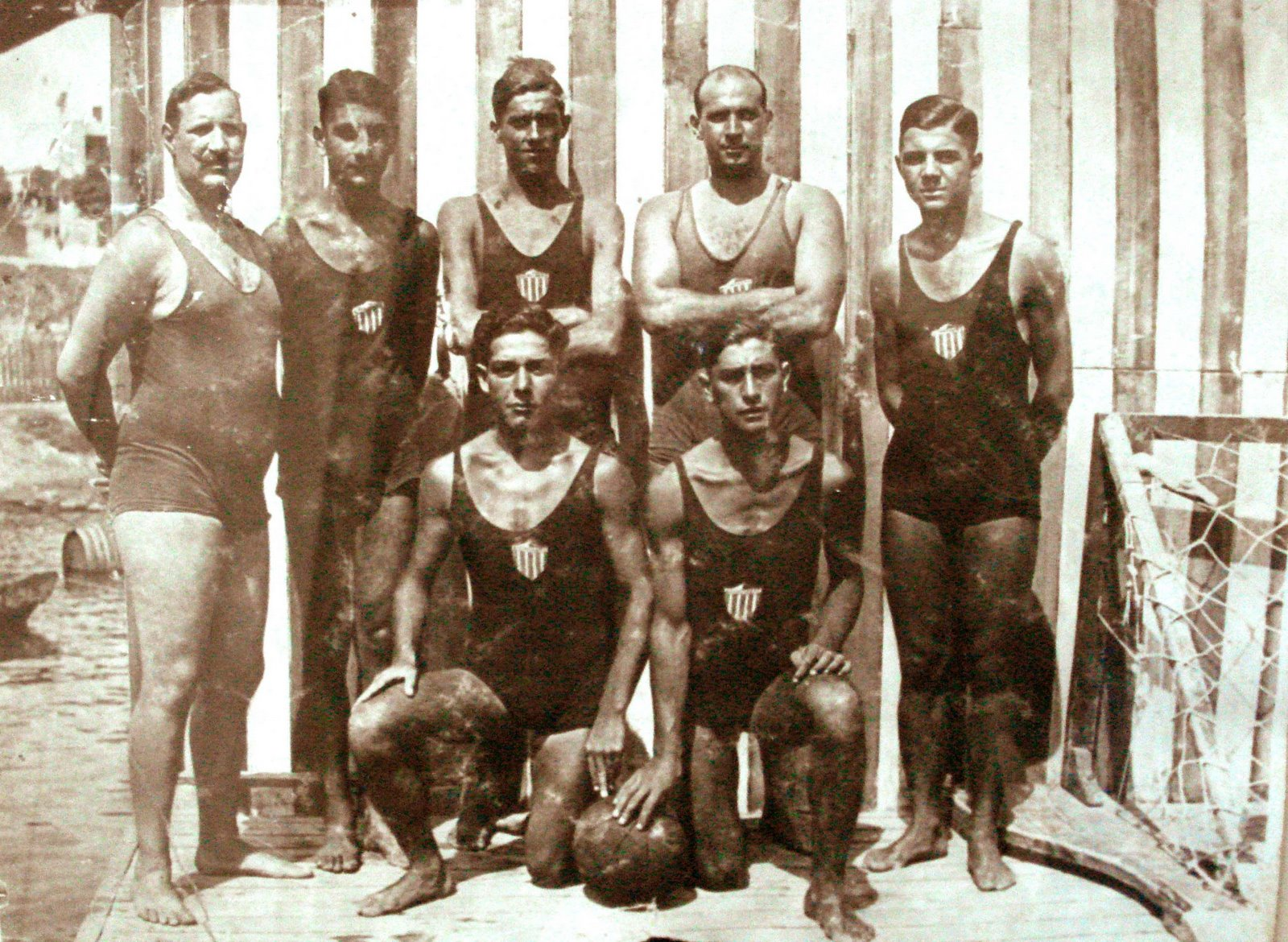
Olympiacos Water Polo team in 1927. This roster won the first Greek League title in Olympiacos' long history.

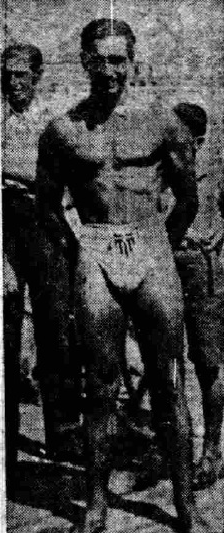
Andreas Kourachanis

Olympiacos men's water polo team was founded in 1925, being one of the first sports departments of Olympiacos CFP that was founded right after the Football team (along with the Athletics and Swimming departments).

In 1927 Olympiacos won the first League title in its history, by defeating Ethnikos Piraeus by a 3–2 scoreline in the final, with players like Nikolaos Kaloudis, Nikolaos Baltatzis - Mavrokordatos, Emmanouil Baltatzis - Mavrokordatos, Ioannis Papadakis, Andreas Athanasianos, Siadimas, Kivotos and Kordopatis.

In 1933 Olympiacos secured their second League title, after a 4–2 win against Ethnikos in the final, with players such as Andreas Kourachanis (goalkeeper), Nikolaos Baltatzis - Mavrokordatos, Takis Provatopoulos, Ioannis Papadakis, Ioannis Isigonis, Andreas Athanasianos and Kivotos. Provatopoulos scored 3 goals and Athanasianos one.

The next season the Red-Whites won a back-to-back League title, by defeating Ethnikos once again with the same 4–2 scoreline in the final. The goals were scored by Provatopoulos (2 goals), Leonidas Alexiou and Isigonis.

In 1936 the team secured their fourth Greek Water Polo League title, this time by defeating K.O. Piraeus with 5–1 in the final.

On 28 October 1940, Fascist Italy invaded Greece, and several Olympiacos players joined the Hellenic Armed Forces to fight against the Axis invaders in World War II. Olympiacos water polo goalkeeper and swimming champion Andreas Kourachanis, was killed in a battle against the Italians. Hellenic Navy Ensign Takis Kontaratos, who was both an Olympiacos water polo player and a midfielder of Olympiacos F.C. as well, was one of the 72 Greek soldiers who were killed in the sinking of Greek destroyer Vasilissa Olga by Junkers Ju 88 bombers of LG 1 of Nazi Germany's Luftwaffe in Lakki harbor of Leros on the morning of 26 September 1943.

=== 1946–1992 ===
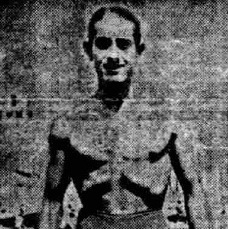
Club legend Takis Provatopoulos

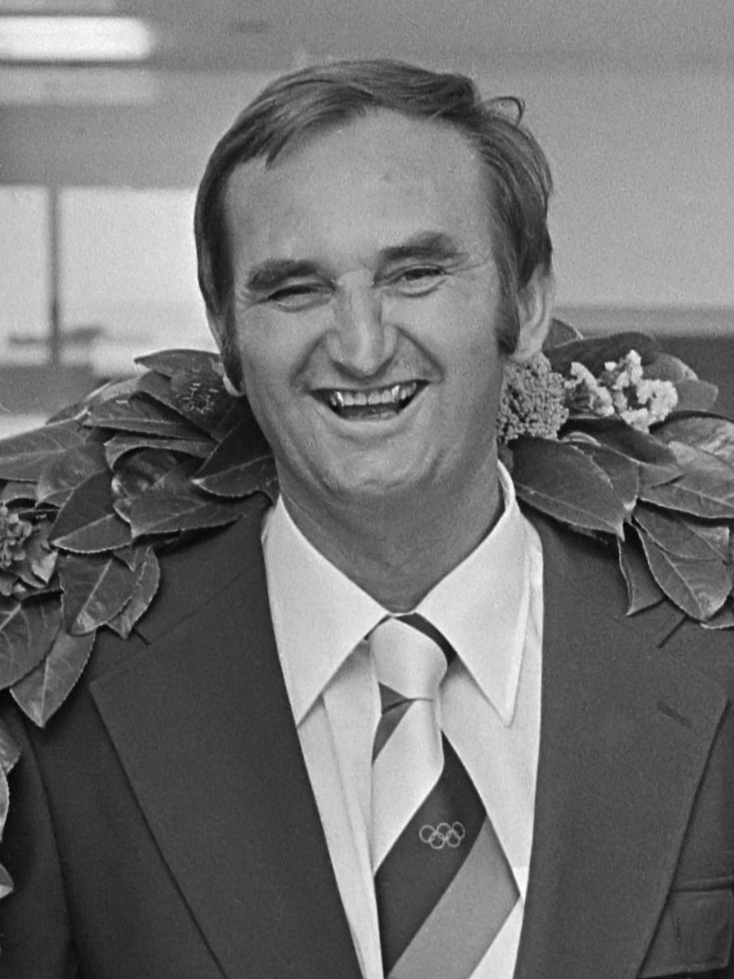
Hall of Fame coach Ivo Trumbić, under whose guidance Olympiacos won the League title in 1971.

After the war, Olympiacos created a very strong team that won 4 Greek League titles from 1947 to 1952 (1947, 1949, 1951, 1952). The 1949 title was won by players like Takis Provatopoulos, Alekos Monastiriotis, Manolis Papadopoulos, Leonidas Alexiou, Christos Oikonomou, Asimakis, Kleoudis, Maragoudakis, Dimitropoulos and Chalas, after a 3–1 win against Ethnikos Piraeus. In 1951 under the guidance of coach Christos Svolopoulos and players like Takis Provatopoulos, Alekos Monastiriotis, Manolis Papadopoulos, Nikos Teleionis, Babis Gerakarakis, Vasilis Ontrias and Asimakis secured the Greek League title after a 6–2 against N.O Mitilinis in the final. The next season, they won their 4th title in 6 years with key players such as Alekos Monastiriotis, Leonidas Alexiou, Nikos Teleionis, Babis Gerakarakis, Nikos Bistis, Vasilis Ontrias and Asimakis.

In 1969, after a 17-year drought, Olympiacos was crowned Greek champions again, under the guidance of coach Makis Charitos and players like Ioannis Palios, Takis Michalos, Periklis Damaskos, Georgios Palikaris, Stathis Sarantos, Vangelis Koskinas, Spyros Tsiminos, Giorgos Venardos, Spyros Ioannidis, Ilias Damaskos and Omiros Polychronopoulos.

In 1971, Olympiacos board hired the world-class head coach Ivo Trumbić (Hall of Fame inductee in 2014), under whose guidance Olympiacos won the League title in 1971, the 10th Greek League title in the club's history, with a roster of solid Greek players like Ioannis Palios, Takis Michalos, Periklis Damaskos, Georgios Palikaris, Stathis Sarantos, Vangelis Koskinas, Giorgos Venardos, Spyros Ioannidis, Sarantis Sarantos, Ilias Damaskos and Omiros Polychronopoulos.

After the 1971 title, Olympiacos created several strong teams in the following years, like the 1979 team coached by Mile Nakić with players like Stathis Sarantos, Spyros Kapralos, Andreas Gounas, Giorgos Venardos, Spyros Tsiminos, Babis Charalambidis, Nikos Beristianos, Christos Daras and Antonis Karavanos. and later on with solid Greek players like Michalis Kouretas, Giorgos Katsoulis, Giannis Ladas, Andreas Miralis, Giorgos Michailidis, Thanasis Katsoulis and Manolis Psarros but nevertheless, the Red-Whites spent twenty-one years without a League title.

=== 1992–2019: The Golden Era ===
==== Domestic domination, first European final (1992–1998) ====
In 1992 Olympiacos finally returns to the top of Greek water polo in an impressive fashion, winning both the Greek League and the Greek Cup to complete the first Double in its history. Under the guidance of coach Nikos Loukatos and players like Kyriakos Giannopoulos, Nikos Venetopoulos, Antonis Aronis, Thodoris Vlachos, Kostas Loudis, Dimitris Kravaritis, Themis Chatzis, Sakis Platanitis, Charis Pavlidis και Zafeiris Tzinis, Olympiacos clinched their history's eleventh Greek League title and their first ever Greek Cup after a 9–8 win against NO Patras in the final.

The next season Olympiacos hired Boris Popov, one of the world's greatest water polo coaches, who was head coach of the Soviet Union men's national water polo team that remained undefeated from 1980 to 1986 and won the gold medal at the 1980 Olympics and the gold medal at the 1982 World Championship. Under Popov's guidance, the Red-Whites won a second consecutive domestic Double, securing their history's 12th League title, as well as the Greek Cup after an 8–4 win against ANO Glyfada in the final.

The next three seasons (1994–95, 1995–96 and 1996–97), Mile Nakić came back for a third successful stint in Olympiacos and coached the Red-Whites to two consecutive Greek League titles (1994–95, 1995–96), beating Ethnikos Piraeus in 1995 (3–0 wins in the finals) and NO Vouliagmeni in 1996 (2–1 wins in the finals) and one Greek Cup (1996–97), beating NO Patras 9–8 in the Cup final. Key players of this Olympiacos team were Thodoris Chatzitheodorou, Nikos Venetopoulos, Kostas Loudis, Makis Voltirakis, Themis Chatzis, Sakis Platanitis, Thodoris Vlachos, Dimitris Kravaritis and Charis Pavlidis.

In season 1997–98, Nikos Loukatos, the coach of the 1992 Double, was hired as head coach and players like Giannis Thomakos, Antonis Vlontakis and Gavin Arroyo joined the team. Under Loukatos guidance, the Red-Whites won the Greek Cup after a 10–8 win against NO Patras in the final and the Greek Super Cup, beating Vouliagmeni 10−5 in the final. Most importantly, Olympiacos reached a European final for the first time in its history; after an impressive campaign, the team qualified for the LEN Cup Winners' Cup two-legged final, where they played against Ferencváros. Olympiacos won the first leg in Piraeus by 7−6, but lost the second leg 8−6 in Budapest after a thrilling game.

==== European powerhouse: twice European champions, Super Cup champions, twice Quadruple winners, domestic dynasty (1998–present) ====
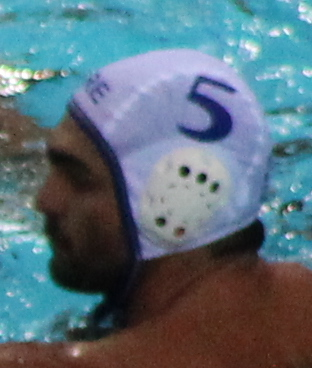
Thodoris Chatzitheodorou played for 15 seasons (1995–2010) for Olympiacos and won 27 titles (1 LEN Champions League, 1 LEN Super Cup, 12 Greek Leagues, 11 Greek Cups, 2 Greek Super Cups) with the club.

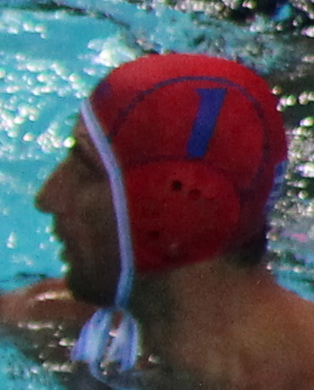
Nikos Deligiannis played for 14 years (2001–2015) for Olympiacos and won 1 LEN Champions League, 1 LEN Super Cup, 12 Greek Leagues and 12 Greek Cups with the Red-Whites.

From 1998 to 2005 Olympiacos won 7 consecutive Greek League titles which is a record for the A1 League, which was established in 1987, and a record as well for the club.

In season 1998–99 Nikola Stamenić, one of the greatest coaches in the history of the sport, became the team's new head coach. Under Stamenić guidance, Yugoslavia men's national water polo team had won the gold medal in both the 1991 World Championship in Perth and the 1991 European Championship in Athens, becoming World and European Champions in the same year. Stamenić imposed strict professional conditions in Olympiacos, establishing a very demanding training program, iron-fisted discipline and meticulous tactical analysis.

Under Stamenić, Olympiacos players improved significantly in both mental, physical, technical and tactical level, and in two years they managed to win 2 Greek League titles, 1 Greek Super Cup, and reach the final of the LEN Cup Winners' Cup in 1999, where they lost to Mladost, despite coming close to an amazing come-back in the second final leg, where they led the score by 10−2 at some point in the game (10−6 final score). Stamenic became a legend for the club and his contribution to Olympiacos and to Greek water polo in general is considered enormous. His training methods, his tactics and his deep understanding of every aspect of the game of water polo exerted a great influence on this generation of Olympiacos players.

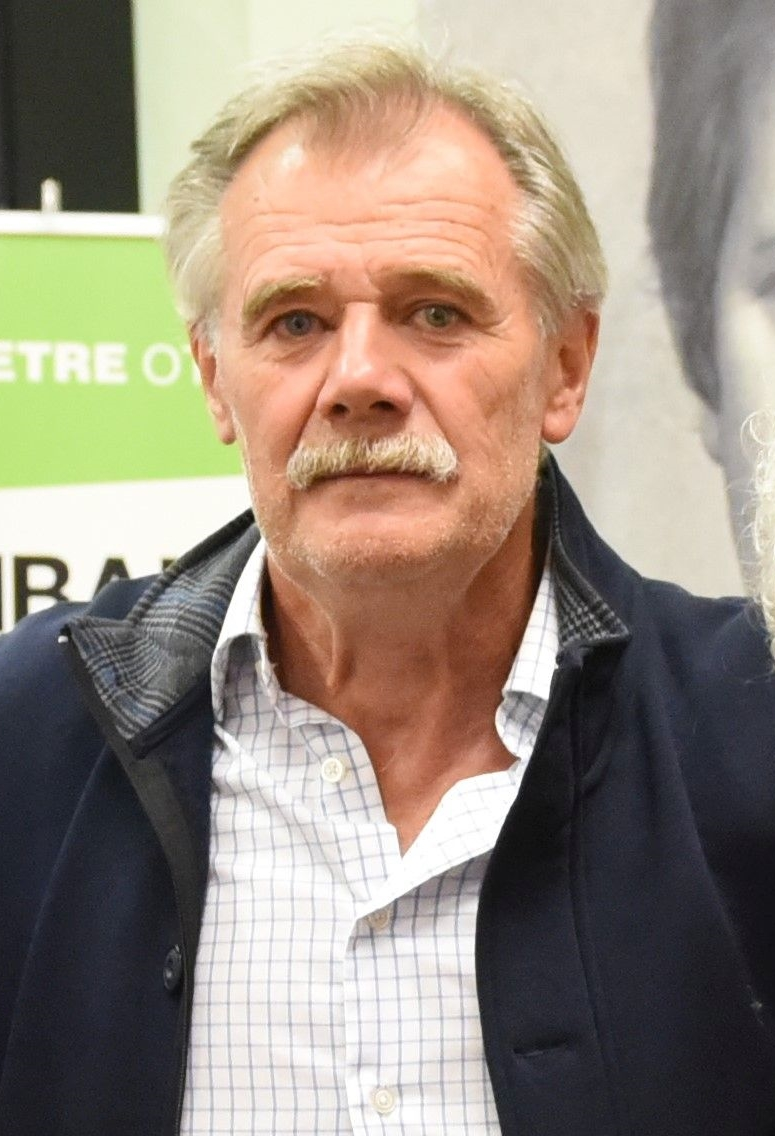
Zoltán Kásás coached Olympiacos to the Continental Quadruple (LEN Champions League, LEN Super Cup, Greek Championship, Greek Cup) in 2002.

Stamenić left Olympiacos in the summer of 2000 and Dragan Matutinović became the team's new head coach. Olympiacos had a very successful season, winning both the Greek League and the Greek Cup and becoming the first ever Greek club to reach the LEN Champions League final. In the semi-final of the LEN Champions League 2000-01 Final Four in Dubrovnik, they beat Italian powerhouse CN Posillipo with 7–6 and reached the final of the competition. There, they faced home team VK Jug and lost 8–7 after two overtimes in a thrilling game which was marked by a highly controversial decision of referee Boris Margeta. With the score at 5–5, Olympiacos scored a goal with a spectacular backhand shot by Thodoris Chatzitheodorou with only 4 seconds left in the game, a goal that was disallowed by Margeta as a foul.

Despite the great season, Matutinović left the club and Olympiacos board signed the great Hungarian coach Zoltán Kásás to replace him. Under Kásás guidance in 2001–02 Olympiacos had the most successful season in their history. They became the first club ever in water polo history (since the establishment of the modern Champions League format in 1996) to win four out of four competitions in a single year, thus completing the Continental Quadruple, comprising the Triple Crown (LEN Champions League, Greek Championship, Greek Cup) and the LEN Super Cup. They won both the 2002 LEN Champions League and the 2002 LEN Super Cup in Budapest, beating home teams Honvéd and Vasas respectively. Key players of this historical Olympiacos team were Makis Voltirakis, Thodoris Chatzitheodorou, Petar Trbojević, Giannis Thomakos, Themis Chatzis, Antonis Vlontakis, Giorgos Psychos, Thodoris Kalakonas, Nikos Deligiannis, Sakis Platanitis, Dimitris Kravaritis and Arsenis Maroulis.

In season 2002–03 with Kásás as head coach Olympiacos went on to win the Greek League and the Greek Cup and the next two seasons (2003–04 and 2004–05) under Veselin Đuho's guidance the club managed to win 7 consecutive Greek League titles, an all-time record.

From 2006 to 2011 Olympiacos under the guidance of Greek coach Vangelis Pateros, won 5 consecutive domestic Doubles, two of which (Greek League and Greek Cup 2009, Greek League and Greek Cup 2010) undefeated and with 31 wins in 31 matches in both seasons, completing 11 Greek League titles in 12 seasons. In European competitions, they reached 2006–07 LEN Euroleague Final Four in Milan, where they lost 10–9 to eventual European Champions Pro Recco in a thrilling semi-final that was decided in the last seconds of the game.

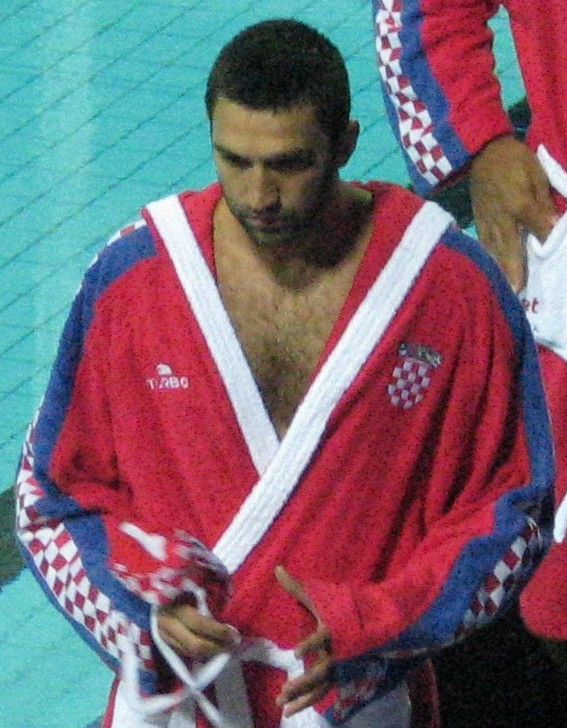
Josip Pavić, FINA World Water Polo Player of the Year in 2012, captained Olympiacos to the 2017–18 Champions League triumph and was voted Final Eight MVP.

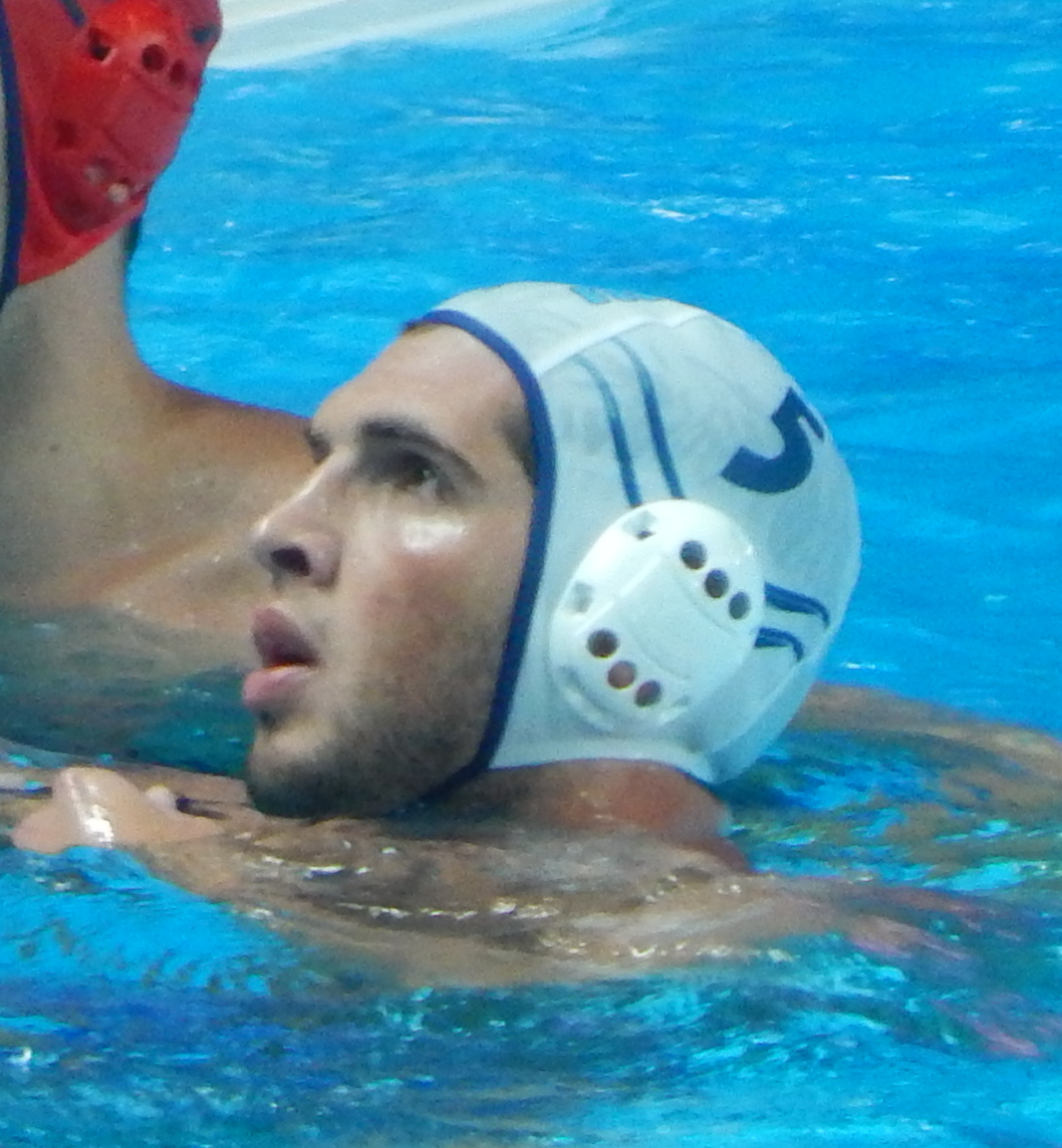
Giannis Fountoulis scored 4 goals in the 2017–18 LEN Champions League Final win against Pro Recco in Genoa.

In 2011, Thodoris Vlachos (who had a long and successful career in Olympiacos as a player) became the new head coach of the team. From 2011 to 2019 under the guidance of Vlachos, Olympiacos have won 1 LEN Champions League, 7 Greek League titles, 6 Greek Cups, 1 Greek Super Cup, 1 Continental Quadruple, and 6 domestic Doubles. In 2018, they won the 2017–18 LEN Champions League in Genoa, beating once again a home team in the final, the Italian powerhouse Pro Recco, the most successful club in the competition with 8 titles. Olympiacos dominated the final game and won the title with a 9–7 scoreline against the Italian side inside their home ground. Along with their second LEN Champions League title, they also completed the second Quadruple Crown in their history (LEN Champions League, Greek Championship, Greek Cup, Greek Super Cup). Key players of this Olympiacos team that was crowned European Champion for the second time in the club's history were Josip Pavić, Giannis Fountoulis, Andro Bušlje, Konstantinos Genidounias, Manolis Mylonakis, Paulo Obradović, Konstantinos Mourikis, Vangelis Delakas, Giorgos Dervisis, Alexandros Gounas, Stelios Argyropoulos and Dimitris Nikolaidis. Under Vlachos, Olympiacos have also reached the final of the 2015–16 LEN Champions League in Budapest, where they lost 6–4 to VK Jug, and the final of the 2018–19 LEN Champions League in Hannover, where they lost in the penalty shootout to Ferencváros.

Overall, from 2006–07 through the 2022–23 season, Olympiacos domestically won 15 Doubles (Greek Championship and Greek Cup) in 17 seasons, five of them straight (2007–2011), and six more undefeated and having won every game (without even a single draw) in both the Greek League and the Greek Cup (2008–09, 2009–10, 2013–14, 2014–15, 2015–16, 2017–18). The club also holds many more unique records in the domestic competitions. They have achieved an all-time record of 163 straight wins in both the Greek League's regular season and play-offs, which lasted from May 2013 to May 2019. Additionally, Olympiacos holds the record for the fewest losses (overall), the most goals scored in a season (446 goals in season 2017–18, beating their previous record of 444 goals in season 2015–16), and the fewest goals conceded in a season (100 goals in season 2015–16).

== Honours ==
=== Continental Competitions ===
- European Aquatics Champions League
  - Champions (2): 2001–02, 2017–18
  - Runners-up (3): 2000–01, 2015–16, 2018–19
  - 3rd place (1): 2023–24
  - 4th place (1): 2006–07
  - Final Four (8): 2001, 2002, 2007, 2016, 2018, 2019, 2024, 2026
- European Aquatics Super Cup
  - Winners (1): 2002
  - Runners-up (1): 2018
- LEN Cup Winners' Cup (defunct)
  - Runners-up (2): 1997–98, 1998–99

=== Domestic Competitions ===
- Greek League

Champions (40) (record): 1926–27, 1932–33, 1933–34, 1935–36, 1946–47, 1948–49, 1950–51, 1951–52, 1968–69, 1970–71, 1991–92, 1992–93, 1994–95, 1995–96, 1998–99, 1999–00, 2000–01, 2001–02, 2002–03, 2003–04, 2004–05, 2006–07, 2007–08, 2008–09, 2009–10, 2010–11, 2012–13, 2013–14, 2014–15, 2015–16, 2016–17, 2017–18, 2018–19, 2019–20, 2020–21, 2021–22, 2022–23, 2023–24, 2024–25, 2025–26

- Greek Cup

Winners (27) (record): 1991–92, 1992–93, 1996–97, 1997–98, 2000–01, 2001–02, 2002–03, 2003–04, 2005–06, 2006–07, 2007–08, 2008–09, 2009–10, 2010–11, 2012–13, 2013–14, 2014–15, 2015–16, 2017–18, 2018–19, 2019–20, 2020–21, 2021–22, 2022–23, 2023–24, 2024–25, 2025–26

- Greek Super Cup

Winners (5) (record): 1997, 1998, 2018, 2019, 2020

=== Individual club awards ===
- Quadruple Crown
  - Winners (2): 2001–02 (LEN Champions League, LEN Super Cup, Greek League, Greek Cup), 2017–18 (LEN Champions League, Greek League, Greek Cup, Greek Super Cup)
- Double
  - Winners (24) (record): 1991–92, 1992–93, 2000–01, 2001–02, 2002–03, 2003–04, 2006–07, 2007–08, 2008–09, 2009–10, 2010–11, 2012–13, 2013–14, 2014–15, 2015–16, 2017–18, 2018–19, 2019–20, 2020–21, 2021–22, 2022–23, 2023–24, 2024–25, 2025–26

== International record ==
Season	Achievement	Notes
LEN Champions League
2000–01	Final	defeated Posillipo 7–6 in the semi-final, lost to Jug 7–8 in the final in Dubrovnik
2001–02	European Champions	defeated Jug 8–5 in the semi-final, defeated Honvéd 9–7 in the final in Budapest
2006–07	Final Four	4th place in Milan, lost to Pro Recco 9–10 in the semi-final, lost to Partizan 13–15 in the 3rd place game
2015–16	Final	defeated Szolnok 8–7 in the semi-final, lost to Jug CO 4–6 in the final in Budapest
2016–17	Final Six	6th place in Budapest, lost to Jug CO 8–11 in the quarter-final, lost to Brescia in the 5th place game
2017–18	European Champions	defeated Atlètic-Barceloneta 6–4 in the semi-final, defeated Pro Recco 9–7 in the final in Genoa
2018–19	Final	defeated Pro Recco 12–11 in the semi-final, lost to FTC Telekom Budapest 10–10 (3–4 p) in the final in Hanover
2020–21	Final Eight	7th place in Belgrade, lost to Atlètic-Barceloneta 9–22 in the quarter-final, defeated CN Marseille 13–12 in the 7th place game
2022–23	Final Eight	5th place in Belgrade, lost to Novi Beograd 11–13 in the quarter-final, defeated Jug CO 14–5 and FTC–Telekom Budapest 9–4 in the fifth place games
LEN Cup Winners' Cup
1997–98	Final	lost to Ferencváros, 7–6 (W) in Piraeus, 6–8 (L) in Budapest, in double finals
1998–99	Final	lost to Mladost Hrvatska Lutrija, 4–13 (L) in Zagreb, 10–6 (W) in Piraeus, in double finals
LEN Super Cup
2002	Champions	defeated Vasas 6–5 in the final in Budapest
2018	Final	lost to FTC Telekom Budapest 7–7 (9–11 p) in the final in Budapest

== The road to two LEN Champions League victories ==
=== 2001–02 LEN Champions League victory ===
Round	Team	Home	Away
Group stage (Group 5)	(Ukraine) Dynamo Kyiv	12–5	
Group stage (Group 5)	(Russia) Dynamo Moscow	4–5	
Group stage (Group 5)	(Spain) Atlètic-Barceloneta	6–5	
Quarter-finals (Blue Group)	(Germany) Spandau 04	14–4	8–6
Quarter-finals (Blue Group)	(France) Olympic Nice	7–7	8–7
Quarter-finals (Blue Group)	(Italy) Telemarket Posillipo	11–7	7–9
Semi-final	(Croatia) Jug	8–5	
Final	(Hungary) Honvéd	9–7	

=== 2017–18 LEN Champions League victory ===
Round	Team	Home	Away
Group A	(Croatia) Jug CO	8–6	8–10
Group A	(Spain) Atlètic-Barceloneta	14–10	7–7
Group A	(Italy) Brescia	13–6	7–6
Group A	(Russia) Dynamo Moscow	17–9	13–9
Group A	(Germany) Waspo'98 Hannover	11–7	12–7
Group A	(Hungary) Orvosegyetem	10–7	10–6
Group A	(Serbia) Partizan	16–8	7–4
Quarter-final	(Germany) Spandau 04	6–5	
Semi-final	(Spain) Atlètic-Barceloneta	6–4	
Final	(Italy) Pro Recco	9–7	

== Supporters ==
Olympiacos fans are known for their support to the men's water polo team, with the atmosphere at home matches in Papastrateio Hall regarded as raucous and passionate to such an extent that is rarely seen in water polo matches. Papastrateio is widely considered one of the most fearsome and strong home grounds in Europe. Starting from season 2015–16, Olympiacos has won 19 out of their last 20 LEN Champions League home games in Piraeus (losing only to Szolnoki in the 2016–17 season), while their last defeat in the domestic competitions was recorded on 8 May 2013, with the Red-Whites counting more than 5 1/2 years with nothing but straight wins at home in both the Greek League and the Greek Cup.

In 2016 Olympiacos fans carried out the largest fan movement in the history of the sport in the European continent, as more than 1000 Olympiacos supporters travelled to Budapest for the 2016 LEN Champions League Final in the Alfréd Hajós Swimming Pool.

The large Alfréd Hajós pool was filled with Olympiacos fans from Greece and many other European cities, who provided a passionate support to the team in both the semi-final and the final game of the competition.

Olympiacos fans have created a very popular chant to describe the atmosphere they usually create in Olympiacos water polo matches in Papastrateio Hall. They sing: "For your glory Legend, we're gonna turn Papastrateio Hall into a madhouse" (Greek: Θρύλε για το δικό σου μεγαλείο, το Παπαστράτειο τρελοκομείο).

== Current roster ==
2026–27

Number	Nationality	Player	Height	Date of birth
Goalkeepers (3)
1	(Greece)	Emmanouil Zerdevas	1.85	12/08/1997
13	(Greece)	Panagiotis Tzortzatos	1.84	11/05/1992
13	(Greece)	Konstantinos Limarakis	1.92	14/08/1999
Defense (3)
2	(Hungary)	Dániel Angyal	2.00	29/03/1992
10	(Greece)	Vangelis Georvasakis	1.89	06/04/2008
11	(Greece)	Alexandros Alamanos	1.97	03/03/2000
Offense (3)
8	(Greece)	Manolis Solanakis	1.85	27/04/1994
8 (10)	(Greece)	Semir Spachits	1.90	18/11/2005
10	(Croatia)	Luka Lončar	1.96	26/06/1997
Midfielder (11)
3	(Croatia)	Loren Fatović	1.86	16/11/1996
4	(Greece)	Konstantinos Genidounias (C)	1.83	03/05/1993
5	(Greece)	Giannis Fountoulis	1.85	25/05/1988
6	(Greece)	Alexandros Papanastasiou	1.94	12/02/1999
7	(Greece)	Nikos Gilas	1.90	21/06/2003
9	(Greece)	Zannis Alafragis	1.93	23/06/1999
11	(Croatia)	Konstantin Kharkov	1.94	23/02/1997
12	(Greece)	Takis Dimou	1.84	28/09/2000
14	(Greece)	Evangelos Pouros	1.95	27/08/2003
15	(Greece)	Spyros Lykoudis	1.89	25/10/2006
15	(Greece)	Panagiotis Mathiopoulos		2009
Coach
	(Croatia)	Elvis Fatović
Assistant coach
	(Greece)	Vangelis Delakas
	(Greece)	Nikitas Kocheilas

=== Staff ===
Name	Job
(Greece) Giorgos Grigoris Karachalios	Doctor
(Greece) Panagiotis Adamopoulos	Physioterapist
(Greece) Nikos Skandalakis	General Manager
(Greece) Manolis Vasileiadis	Trainer
(Greece) Christos Kodellas	Analyst

== Notable players ==
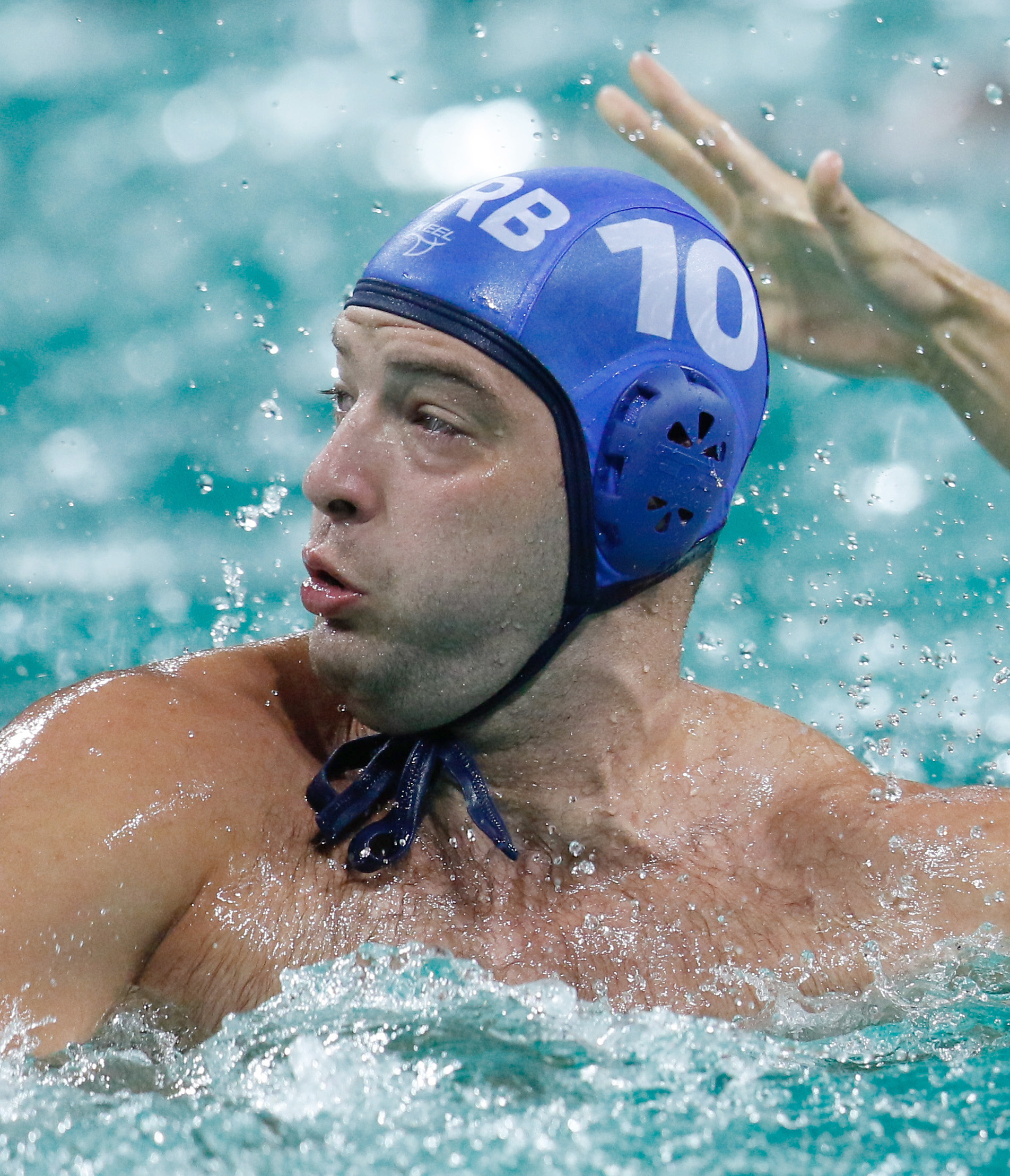
Filip Filipović

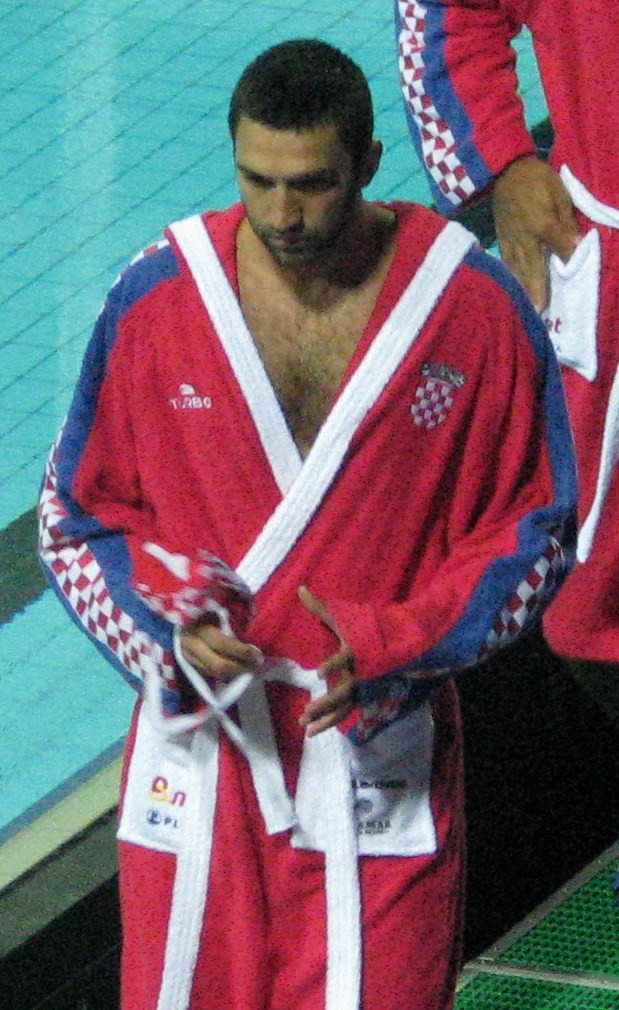
Josip Pavić

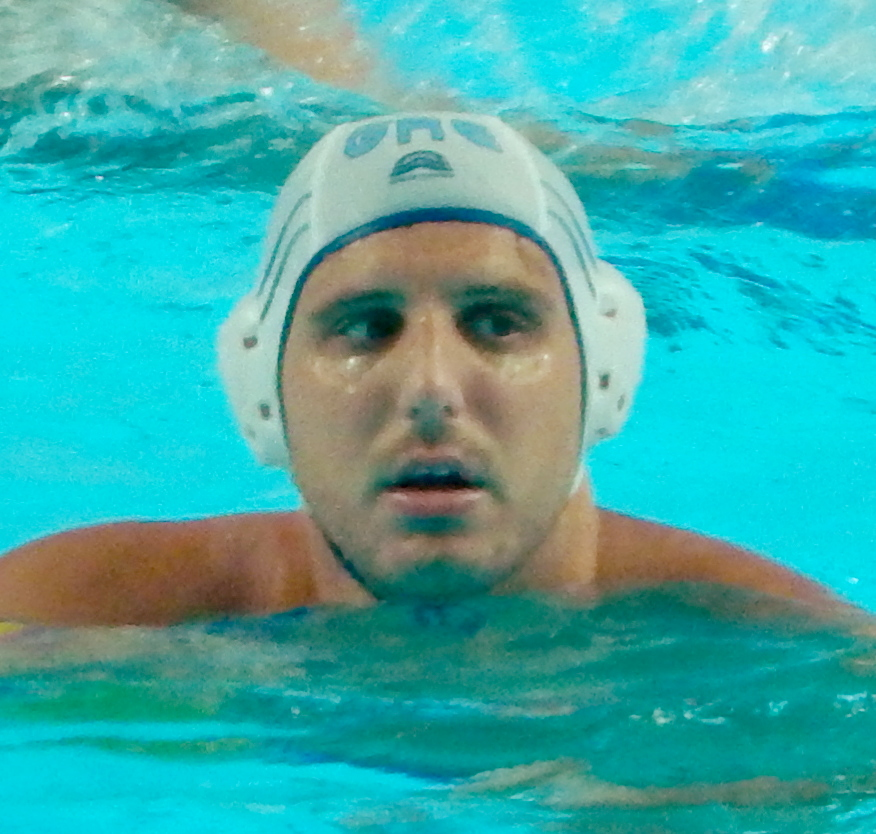
Konstantinos Mourikis

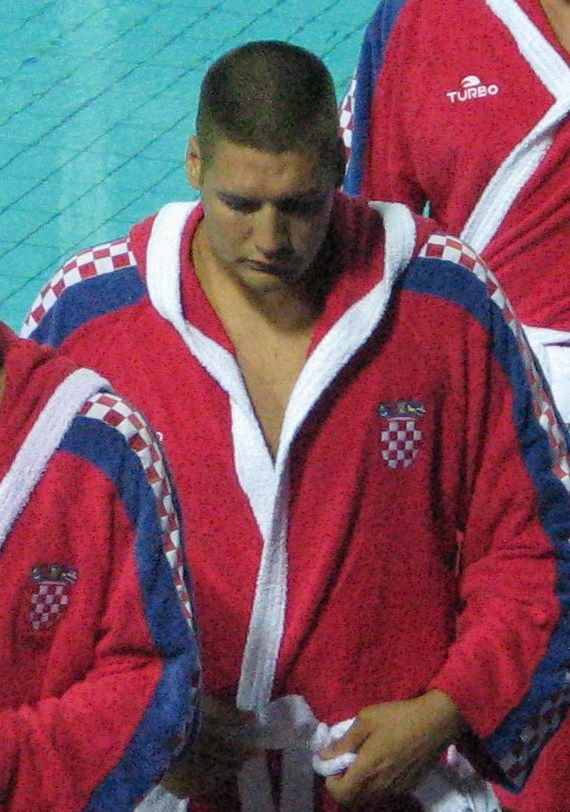
Andro Bušlje

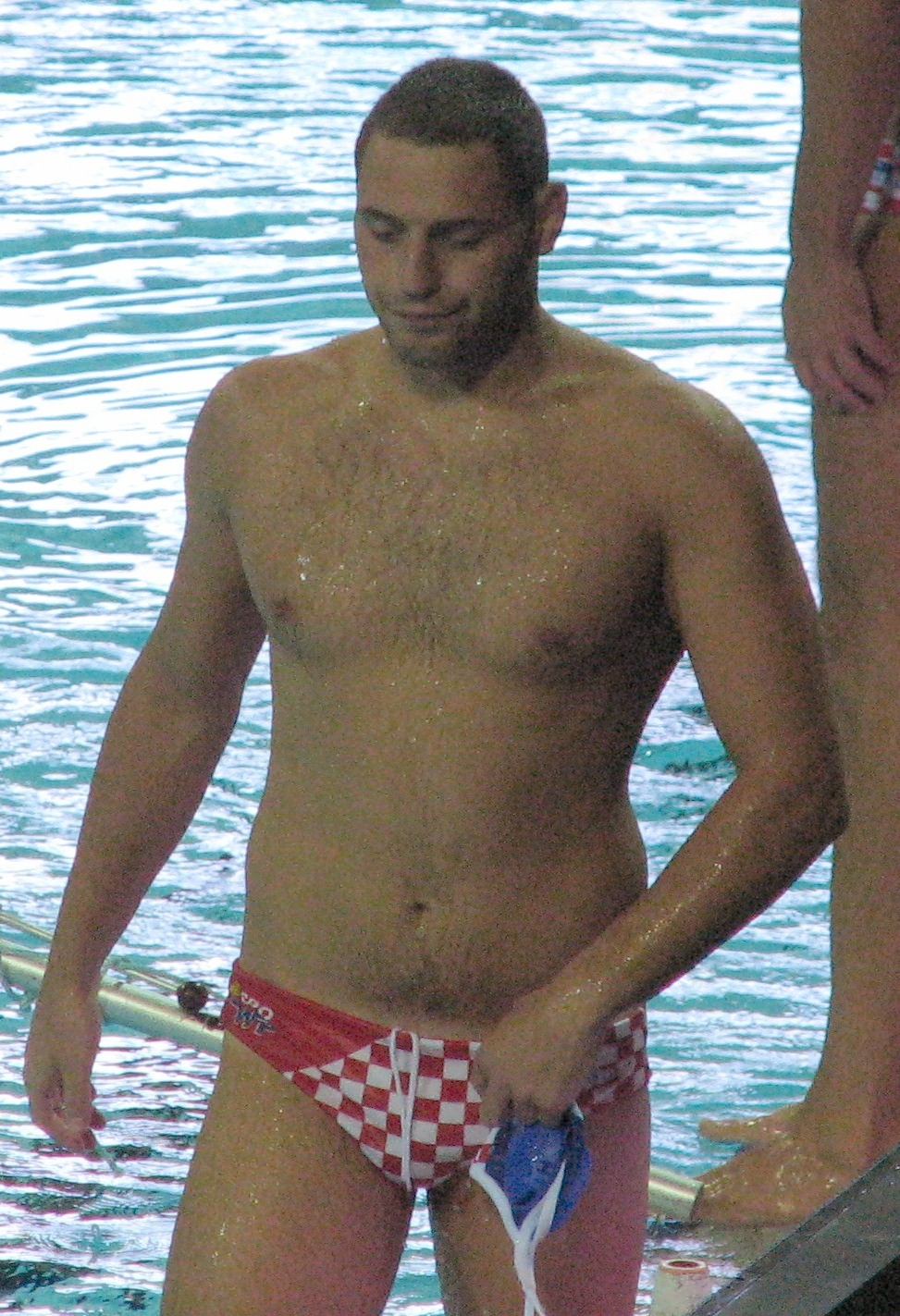
Paulo Obradović

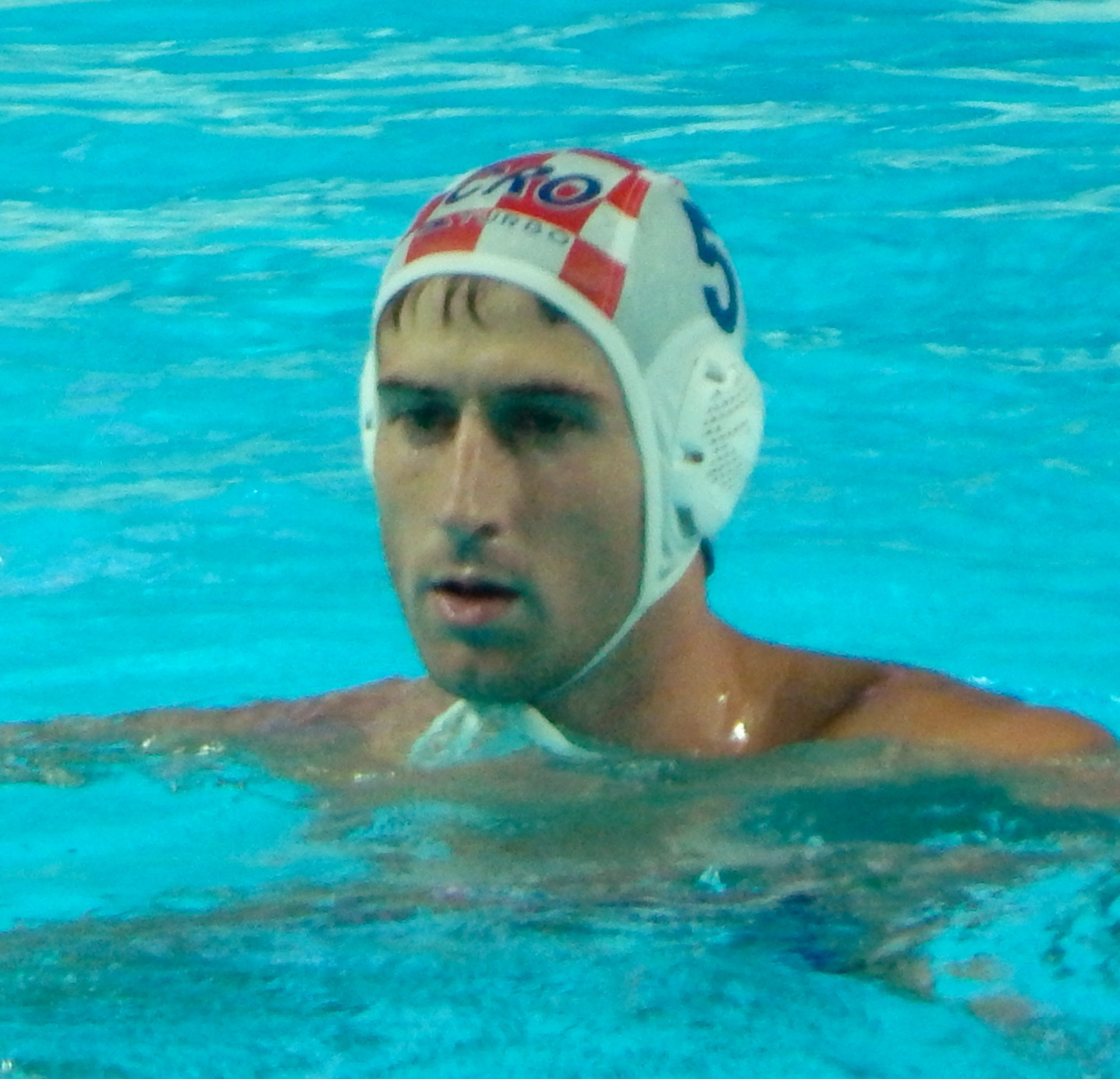
Maro Joković

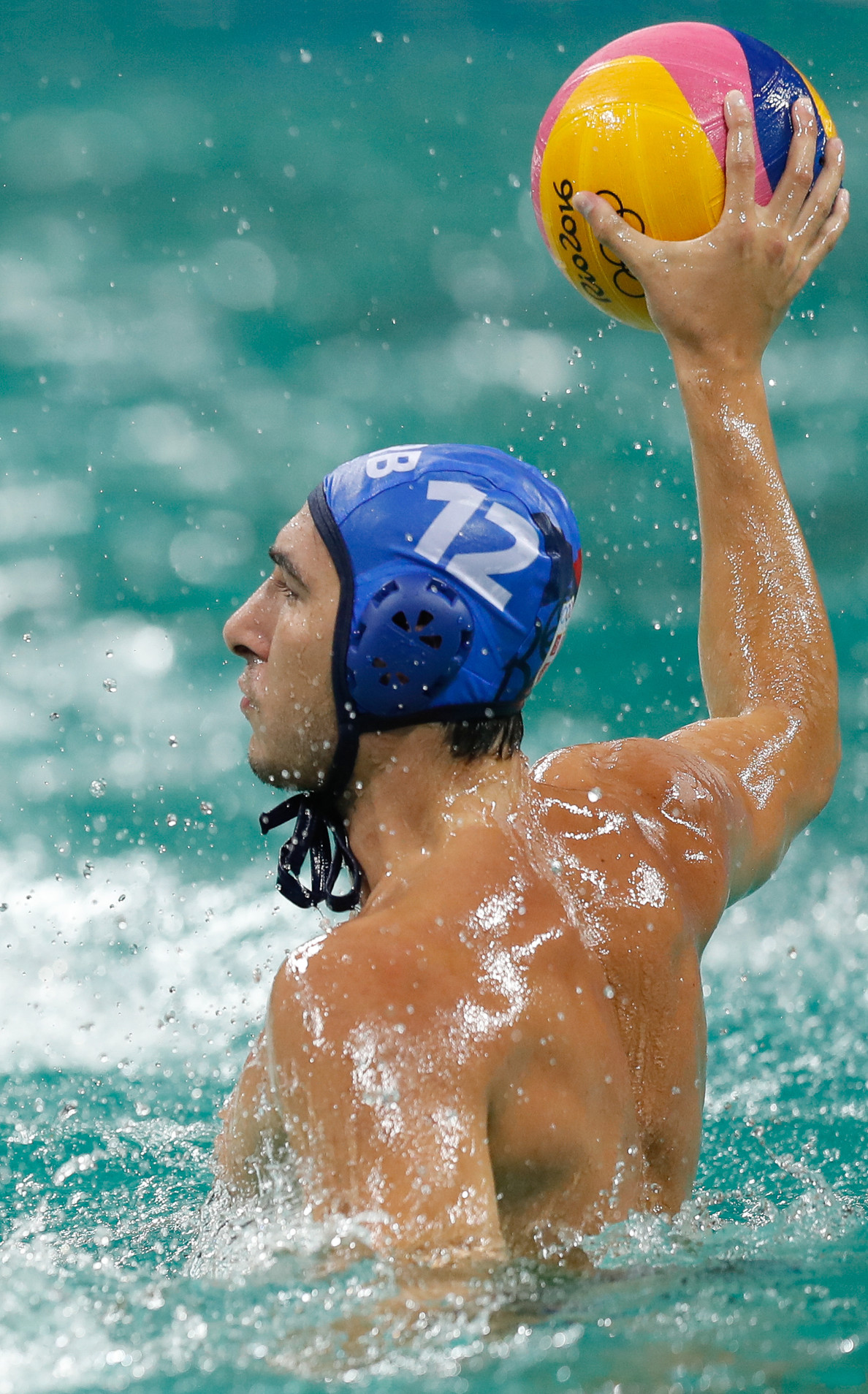
Stefan Mitrović

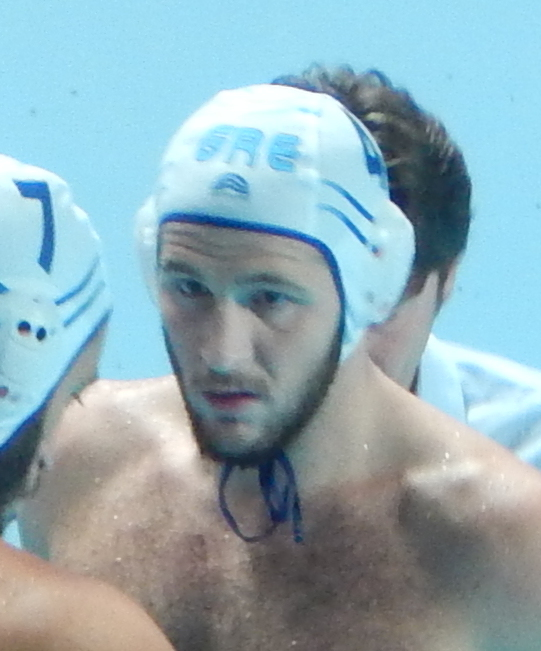
Kostas Genidounias

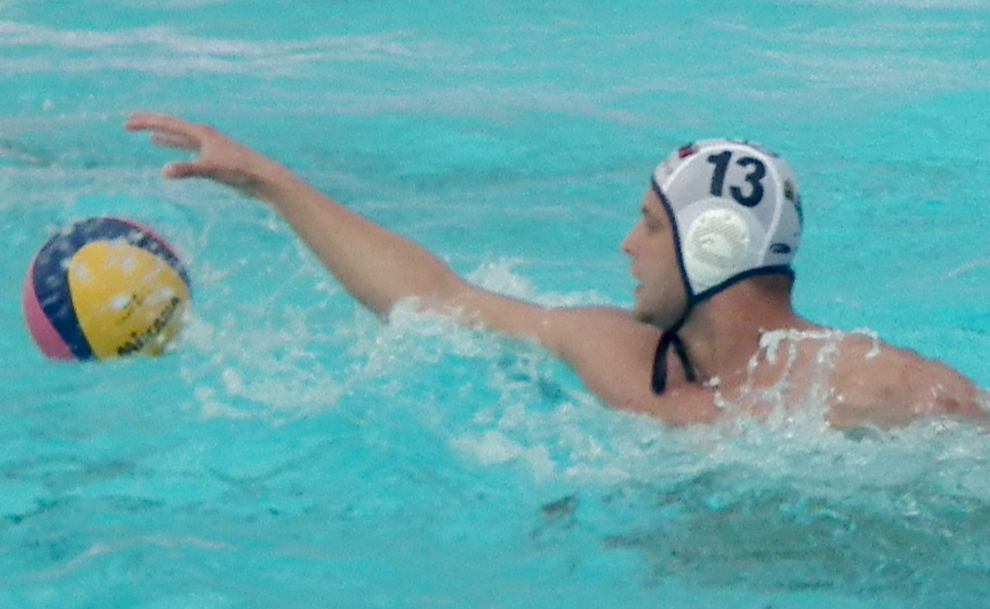
Luka Lončar

Criteria

To appear in this section a player must have either:

- Played at least one season for the club.
- Set a club record or won an individual award while at the club.
- Played at least one official international match for their national team at any time.
- To perform very successfully during period in the club or at later/previous stages of his career.

- (Greece) Giorgos Afroudakis
- (Greece) Christos Afroudakis
- (Greece) Stelios Argyropoulos
- (Greece) Antonis Aronis
- (Greece) Nikos Beristianos
- (Greece) Nikos Bistis
- (Greece) Fotis Blanis
- (Greece) Babis Charalambidis
- (Greece) Makis Charitos
- (Greece) Marios Chatzikiriakakis
- (Greece) Themis Chatzis
- (Greece) Thodoris Chatzitheodorou
- (Greece) Thanasis Chrisospathis
- (Greece) Ilias Damaskos
- (Greece) Periklis Damaskos
- (Greece) Christos Daras
- (Greece) Vangelis Delakas
- (Greece) Nikos Deligiannis
- (Greece) Giorgos Dervisis
- (Greece) Giorgos Doskas
- (Greece) Christos Floros
- (Greece) Giannis Fountoulis
- (Greece) Kostas Galanidis
- (Greece) Stefanos Galanopoulos
- (Greece) Konstantinos Genidounias
- (Greece) Kyriakos Giannopoulos
- (Greece) Alexandros Gounas
- (Greece) Andreas Gounas
- (Greece) Kostas Gouvis
- (Greece) Spyros Ioannidis
- (Greece) Ioannis Isigonis
- (Greece) Konstantinos Kakaris
- (Greece) Thodoris Kalakonas
- (Greece) Nikos Kaloudis
- (Greece) Marios Kapotsis
- (Greece) Spyros Kapralos
- (Greece) Antonis Karavanos
- (Greece) Giorgos Katsoulis
- (Greece) Thanasis Katsoulis
- (Greece) Spyros Kinigalakis
- (Greece) Giannis Kocheilas
- (Greece) Nikitas Kocheilas
- (Greece) Christodoulos Kolomvos
- (Greece) Dimitris Konstas
- (Greece) Vangelis Koskinas
- (Greece) Andreas Kourachanis
- (Greece) Michalis Kouretas
- (Greece) Dimitris Kravaritis
- (Greece) Giannis Ladas
- (Greece) Dimitris Lagonikakis
- (Greece) Kostas Loudis
- (Greece) Charis Malevitis
- (Greece) Arsenis Maroulis
- (Greece) Takis Mathioudakis
- (Greece) Dimitris Mazis
- (Greece) Giorgos Michailidis
- (Greece) Takis Michalos
- (Greece) Alekos Monastiriotis
- (Greece) Konstantinos Mourikis
- (Greece) Dinos Mourtzis
- (Greece) Babis Moutsatsos
- (Greece) Manolis Mylonakis
- (Greece) Dimitris Nikolaidis
- (Greece) Christos Oikonomou
- (Greece) Vasilis Ontrias
- (Greece) Giorgos Palikaris
- (Greece) Giannis Palios
- (Greece) Manolis Papadopoulos
- (Greece) Alexandros Papanastasiou
- (Greece) Charis Pavlidis
- (Greece) Sakis Platanitis
- (Greece) Omiros Polychronopoulos
- (Greece) Kyriakos Pontikeas
- (Greece) Manolis Prekas
- (Greece) Takis Provatopoulos
- (Greece) Manolis Psarros
- (Greece) Giorgos Psychos
- (Greece) Stefanos Santa
- (Greece) Sarantis Sarantos
- (Greece) Stathis Sarantos
- (Greece) Tasos Schizas
- (Greece) Dimitrios Skoumpakis
- (Greece) Nikos Telionis
- (Greece) Giorgos Theodorakopoulos
- (Greece) Argyris Theodoropoulos
- (Greece) Giannis Thomakos
- (Greece) Spyros Tsiminos
- (Greece) Giorgos Venardos
- (Greece) Nikos Venetopoulos
- (Greece) Angelos Vlachopoulos
- (Greece) Thodoris Vlachos
- (Greece) Antonis Vlontakis
- (Greece) Makis Voltirakis
- (Greece) Emmanouil Zerdevas
- (Croatia) Marko Bijač
- (Croatia) Ivan Buljubašić
- (Croatia) Andro Bušlje
- (Croatia) Teo Đogaš
- (Croatia) Luka Lončar
- (Croatia) Maro Joković
- (Croatia) Hrvoje Koljanin
- (Croatia) Andrija Komadina
- (Croatia) Loren Fatović
- (Croatia) Konstantin Kharkov
- (Croatia) Paulo Obradović
- (Croatia) Josip Pavić
- (Croatia) Antonio Petković
- (Croatia) Tihomil Vranješ
- (Germany) Thomas Schertwitis
- (Hungary) Gergő Zalánki
- (Hungary) Dániel Angyal
- (Hungary) Tamás Dala
- (Hungary) Márton Vámos
- (Montenegro) Mlađan Janović
- (Montenegro) Đuro Radović
- (Serbia) Filip Filipović
- (Serbia) Stefan Mitrović
- (Serbia) Slobodan Nikić
- (Serbia) Nikola Rađen
- (Serbia) Petar Trbojević
- (Spain) Albert Español
- (Spain) Blai Mallarach
- (United States) Gavin Arroyo
- (United States) Hannes Daube
- (United States) Chris Humbert
- (United States) Max Irving
- (United States) Jesse Smith
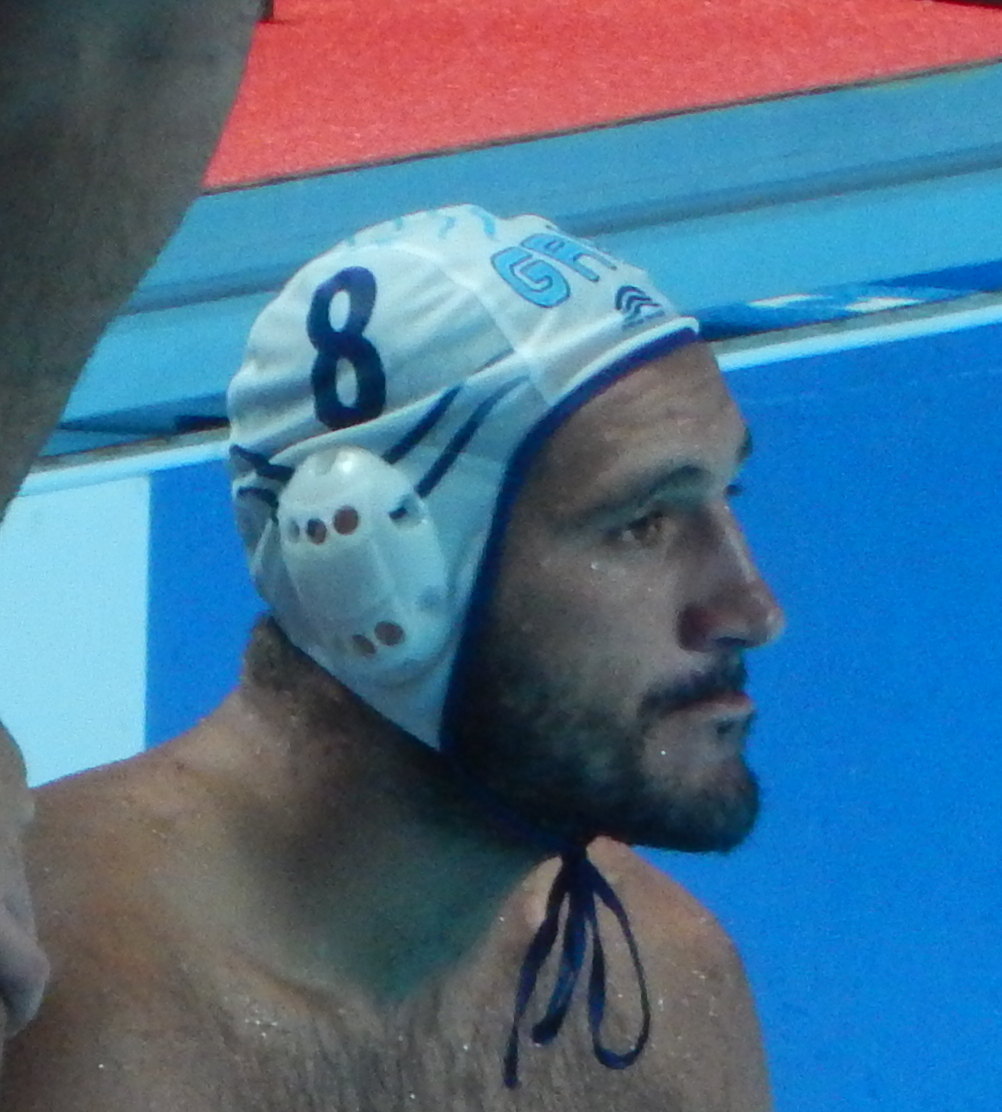
Vangelis Delakas

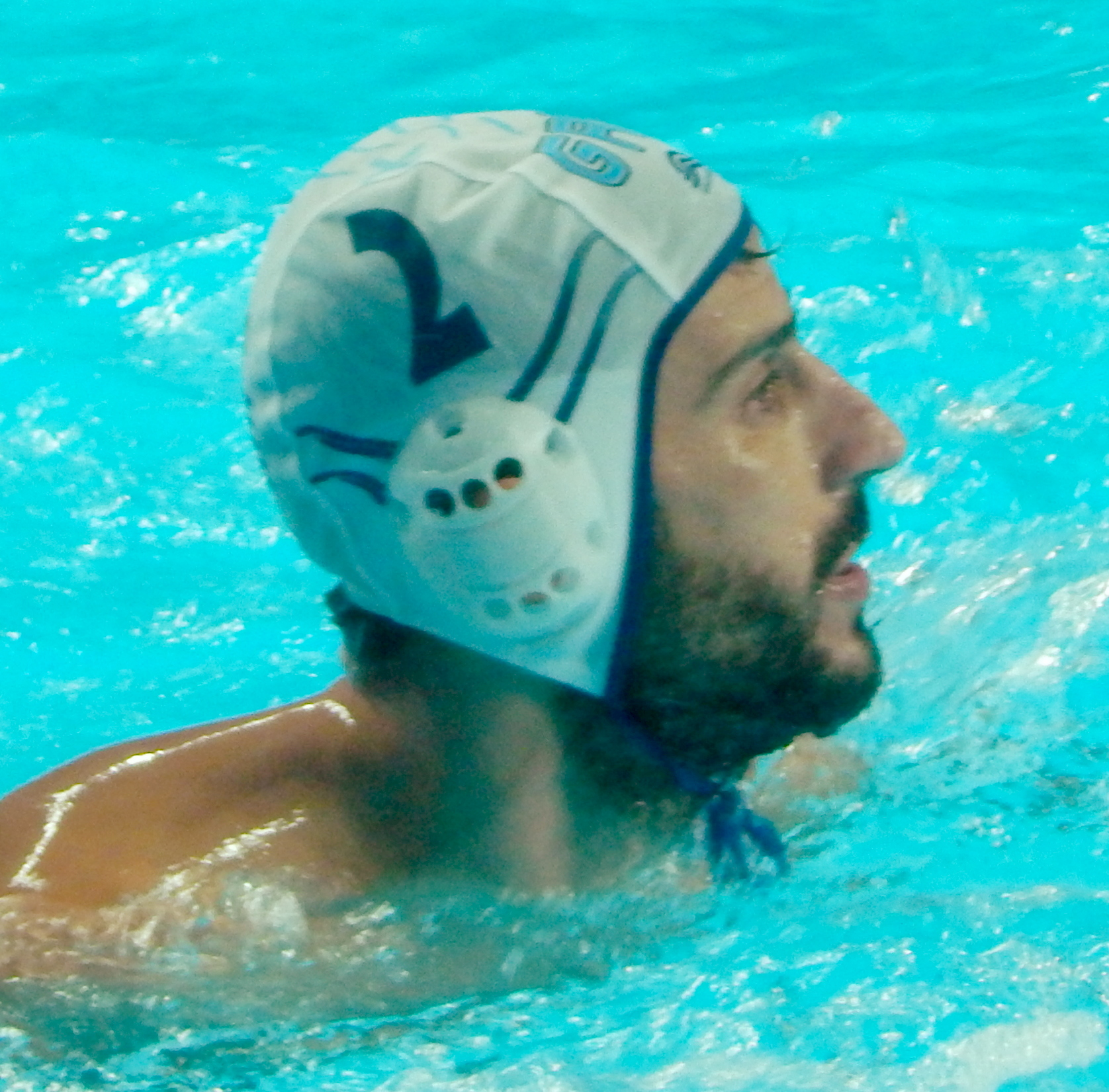
Manolis Mylonakis

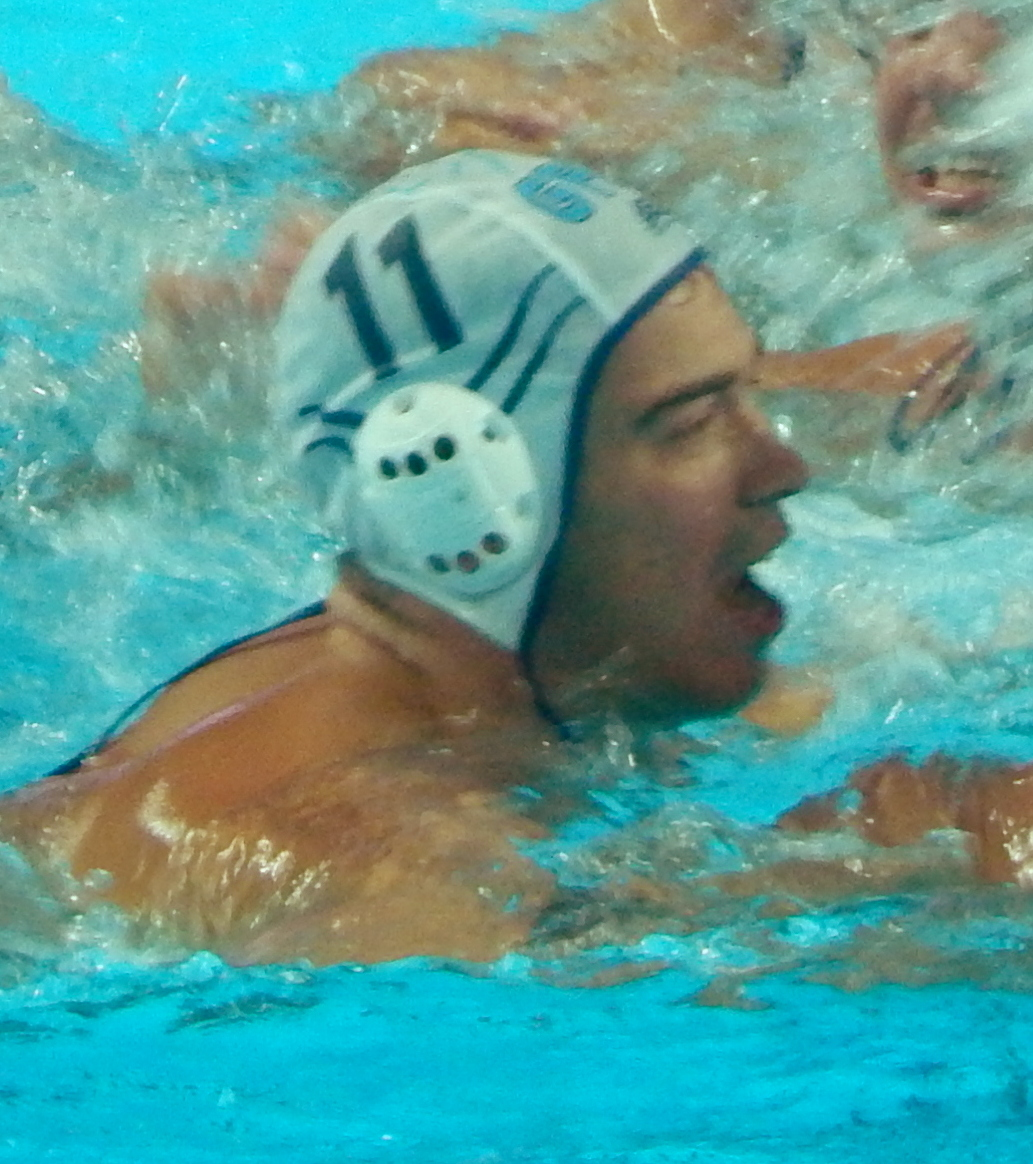
Alexandros Gounas

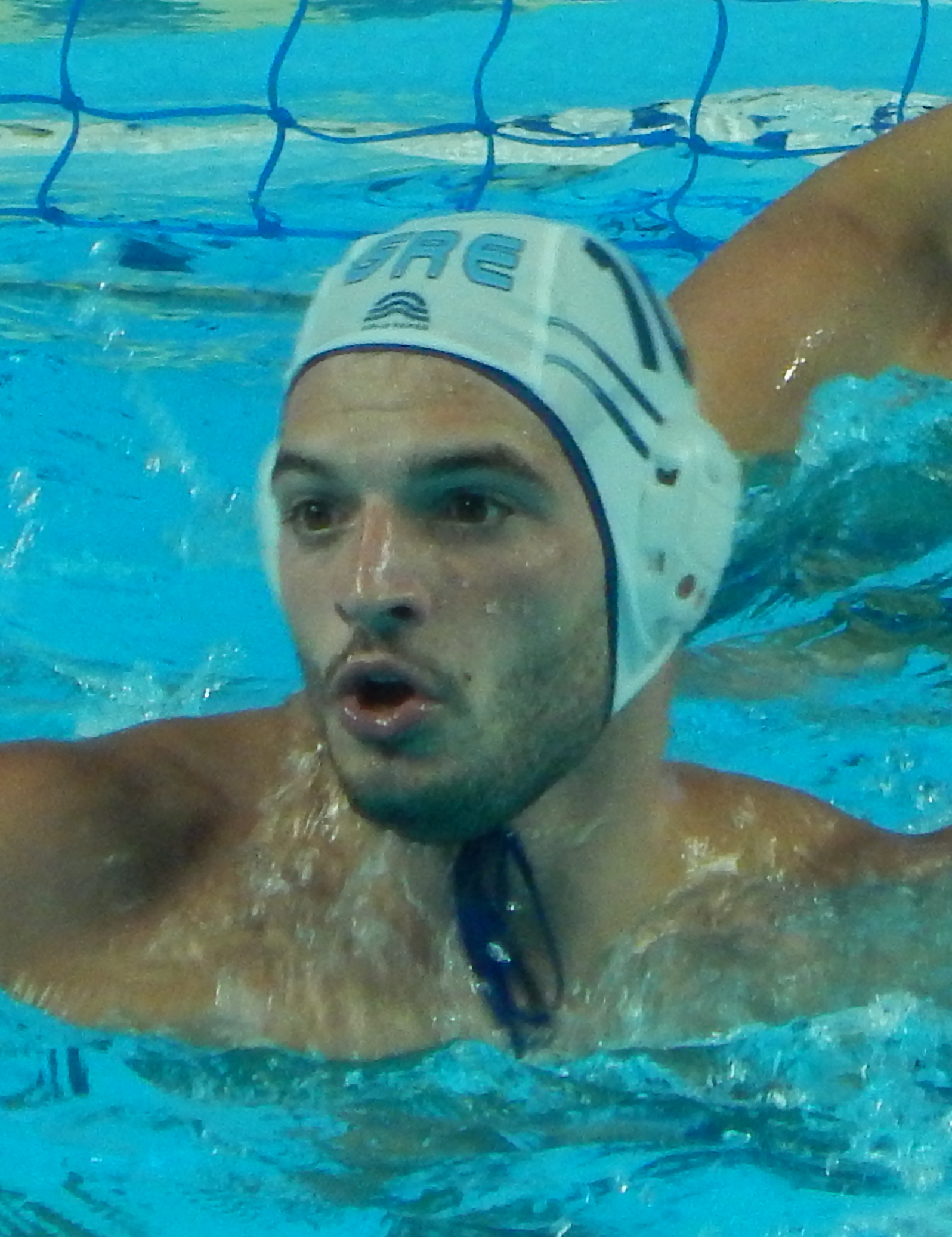
Christodoulos Kolomvos

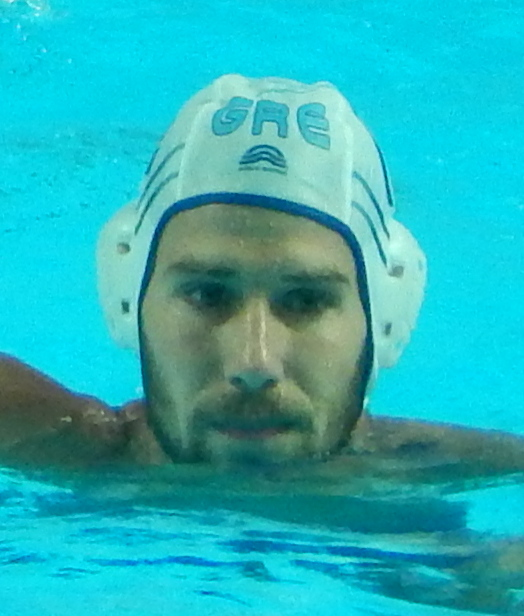
Angelos Vlachopoulos

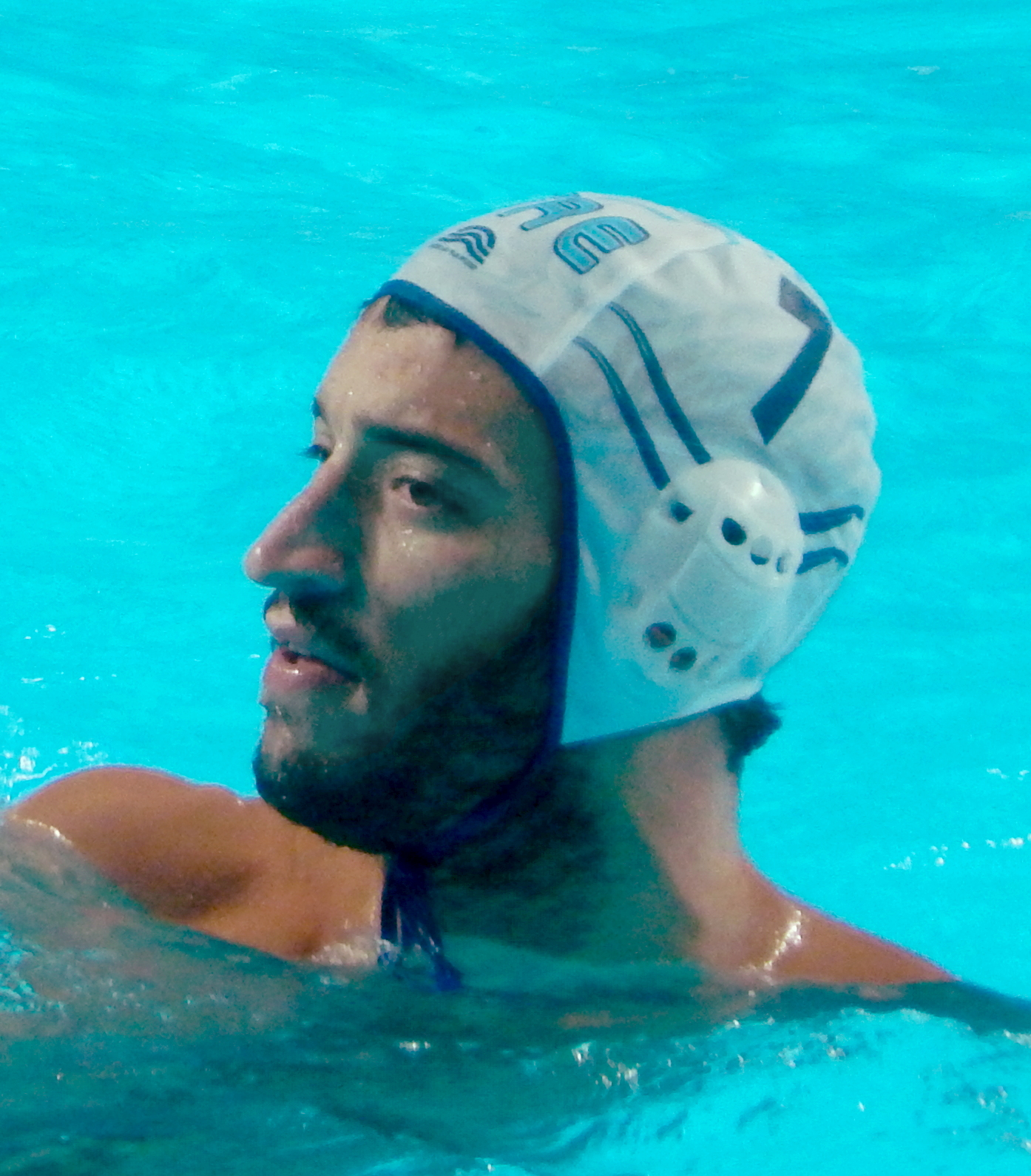
Christos Afroudakis

== Notable coaches ==
- (Greece) Christos Svolopoulos
- (Greece) Makis Charitos
- (Socialist Federal Republic of Yugoslavia) Ivo Trumbić
- (Greece) Nikos Loukatos
- (Russia) Boris Popov
- (Croatia) Mile Nakić
- (Serbia) Nikola Stamenić
- (Croatia) Dragan Matutinović
- (Hungary) Zoltán Kásás
- (Croatia) Veselin Đuho
- (Greece) Vangelis Pateros
- (Greece) Thodoris Vlachos
- (Serbia) Igor Milanović
- (Croatia) Hrvoje Koljanin
- (Croatia) Elvis Fatović

== Statistics ==
=== Greek League records ===
Outline	Record
Most goals scored in a season	446 (2017–18)
Fewest goals conceded in a season	100 (2015–16)
Longest sequence of wins	163 (2nd match of the 2012–13 play-offs on 11 May 2013 – 3rd match of the 2018–19 play-offs on 23 May 2019)
Longest sequence of unbeaten matches	163 (2nd match of the 2012–13 play-offs on 11 May 2013 – 3rd match of the 2018–19 play-offs on 23 May 2019)

== See also ==
- Olympiacos Women's Water Polo Team
