= 2001–02 LEN Champions League =

Water polo sports season

- League: LEN Champions League
- Sport: Water Polo
- Duration: 24 October 2001 to 25 May 2002
- Teams: 8 (preliminary round); 28 (total)

Final Four
- Finals champions: (Greece) Olympiacos (1st title)
- Runners-up: (Hungary) Honvéd

Champions League seasons
- ← 2000–01 2002–03 →

The 2001–02 LEN Champions League was the 39th edition of LEN's premier competition for men's water polo clubs. It ran from 24 October 2001 to 25 May 2002, and it was contested by 28 teams. The Final Four (semifinals, final, and third place game) took place on May 24 and May 25 in Budapest.

== Preliminary round ==
Location of teams of the 2001–02 LEN Champions League group stage.
Blue Group; Red Group.

Key to colors in group tables
Group winners and runners-up advanced to Final four

=== Blue Group ===
Team	Pld	W	D	L	GF	GA	GD	Pts
(Italy) Posillipo	6	5	0	1	56	40	+16	10
(Greece) Olympiacos	6	4	1	1	54	40	+14	9
(France) Olympic Nice	6	1	1	4	44	47	−3	3
(Germany) Spandau 04	6	1	0	5	38	65	−27	2

=== Red Group ===
Team	Pld	W	D	L	GF	GA	GD	Pts
(Croatia) Jug Dubrovnik	6	5	0	1	49	40	+9	10
(Hungary) Honvéd	6	4	0	2	61	45	+16	8
(Russia) Dynamo Moscow	6	1	2	3	38	53	−15	4
(Federal Republic of Yugoslavia) Bečej	6	0	2	4	39	49	−10	2

== Final Four (Budapest) ==
Hajós Alfréd Nemzeti Sportuszoda, Budapest, Hungary

Semifinals; 24 May 2002
(Italy) Posillipo	8
(Hungary) Honvéd	9
(Croatia) Jug Dubrovnik	5
(Greece) Olympiacos	8

Final; 25 May 2002
(Hungary) Honvéd	7
(Greece) Olympiacos	9
Third place
(Italy) Posillipo	8
(Croatia) Jug Dubrovnik	7

=== Final standings ===
	Team
	(Greece) Olympiacos
Silver medal	(Hungary) Honvéd
Bronze medal	(Italy) Posillipo
	(Croatia) Jug Dubrovnik

2001–02 Champions League
Champions
(Greece) Olympiacos
1st title

Themis Khatzis, Theodoros Chatzitheodorou, Nikolaos Deligiannis, Alexandros Gianniotis, Theodoros Kalakonas, Dimitris Kravaritis, Arsenis Maroulis, Athanasios Platanitis, Giorgos Psychos, Ioannis Thomakos, Ilias Lappas, Petar Trbojević, Antonios Vlontakis, Gerasimos Voltirakis
Head coach
Zoltán Kásás

== See also ==
- 2001–02 LEN Cup Winners' Cup
- 2001–02 LEN Cup
