= 2018 LEN Super Cup =

Water polo match

Olympiacos	Ferencváros
(Greece)	(Hungary)
7	7
- Ferencváros won 4–2 on penalties
- Date: 30 November 2018
- Venue: Császár-Komjádi Swimming Stadium, Budapest
- Attendance: 1,600

The 2018 LEN Super Cup was the 37th edition of the LEN Super Cup, an annual water polo match organised by LEN and contested by the reigning champions of the two main European club competitions, the top-tier LEN Champions League and the second-tier LEN Euro Cup. The match was played between European champions Olympiacos, the winners of the 2017–18 LEN Champions League, and Ferencváros, the winners of the 2017–18 LEN Euro Cup.

It was played at the Császár-Komjádi Swimming Stadium in Budapest, Hungary, on 30 November 2018.

== Teams ==
Team	Qualification	Previous participation (bold indicates winners)
(Greece) Olympiacos	Winners of the 2017–18 LEN Champions League	**2002**
(Hungary) Ferencváros	Winners of the 2017–18 LEN Euro Cup	**1978**, **1980**, 2017

=== Squads ===
Olympiacos
No.	Nat.	Player	Birth Date	Position	L/R
1	(Croatia)	Josip Pavić (c)	January 15, 1982	Goalkeeper	R
2	(Greece)	Emmanouil Mylonakis	April 9, 1985	Wing / Centre Back	R
3	(Greece)	Dimitrios Skoumpakis	December 18, 1998	Guard	R
4	(Greece)	Konstantinos Genidounias	May 3, 1993	Centre Back	R
5	(Greece)	Ioannis Fountoulis	May 25, 1988	Wing	R
6	(Greece)	Dimitrios Nikolaidis	June 10, 1999	Centre Forward	R
7	(Greece)	Georgios Dervisis	May 13, 1986	Guard	R
8	(Croatia)	Andro Bušlje	January 4, 1986	Guard	R
9	(Greece)	Konstantinos Mourikis	July 11, 1988	Centre Forward	R
10	(Greece)	Alexandros Gounas	October 3, 1989	Wing	R
11	(Greece)	Stylianos Argyropoulos	August 2, 1996	Centre Forward	R
12	(Croatia)	Paulo Obradović	March 9, 1986	Wing	R
13	(Greece)	Stefanos Galanopoulos	February 22, 1993	Goalkeeper	R

Head coach: Thodoris Vlachos

FTC-Telekom
No.	Nat.	Player	Birth Date	Position	L/R
1	(Hungary)	András Gárdonyi	February 6, 1986	Goalkeeper	
2	(Hungary)	Miklós Gór-Nagy	January 8, 1983	Centre Back / Guard	
3	(Hungary)	Márk Kállay	February 8, 1986	Left Wing	R
4	(Hungary)	Zoltán Pohl	March 27, 1995	Guard	
5	(Hungary)	Márton Vámos	June 24, 1992	Centre Back / Wing	L
6	(Hungary)	Tamás Mezei	September 14, 1990	Centre Forward	L
7	(Hungary)	Toni Német	January 14, 1994	Centre Forward	
8	(Serbia)	Nikola Jakšić	January 17, 1997	Guard	R
9	(Australia)	Aaron Younger	September 25, 1991	Guard	R
10	(Hungary)	Dénes Varga (c)	March 29, 1987	Centre Back	R
11	(Hungary)	Szilárd Jansik	April 6, 1994	Guard	
12	(Serbia)	Stefan Mitrović	March 29, 1988	Centre Back	R
13	(Hungary)	Soma Vogel	July 7, 1997	Goalkeeper	

Head coach: Zsolt Varga

== Match ==
30 November 2018; 20:00 (CET)	Report	(Greece) Olympiacos	7–7 ^{(2–4 PSO)}	Ferencváros (Hungary)	Császár-Komjádi Swimming Stadium, Budapest; Referees: Buch (ESP), Severo (ITA)
30 November 2018; 20:00 (CET)	Report	Score by quarters: 1–1, 3–1, 1–4, 2–1 PSO: 2–4			Császár-Komjádi Swimming Stadium, Budapest; Referees: Buch (ESP), Severo (ITA)
30 November 2018; 20:00 (CET)	Report	2: Dervisis, Nikolaidis; 1: Mylonakis, Genidounias, Mourikis Penalties: Obradović; Dervisis; Genidounias; Fountoulis	Goals	3: Dé. Varga; 2: Mitrović; 1: Kállay, Younger; Penalties: Dé. Varga; Vámos; Younger; Kállay	Császár-Komjádi Swimming Stadium, Budapest; Referees: Buch (ESP), Severo (ITA)
