= Ilias Lappas (water polo) =

Greek water polo player (born 1981)

Personal information
- Nationality: GREEK
- Born: 11-01-1981 KARDITSA
- Occupation: OFFICER IN FIRESERVICE WATER POLO COACH
- Years active: 1995-2020 WATER POLO PLAYER 2007-now OFFICER IN FIRESERVICE 2020-now WATER POLO COACH
- Height: 186 cm (6 ft 1 in)

Sport
- Sport: Water polo
- Club: PLAYING CAREER KO KARDITSA (1995-1998) KOP ILISION (1998-2001) OLYMPIAKOS PIRAEUS (2001-2002) NIREAS CHALNDRIOU (2002-2005) NO LARISSAS (2005-2009) ANO GLYFADAS (2009-2010) NO CHANION (2010-2011) ANO GLYFADAS (2011-2012) NO RETHYMNOU (2012-2015) NO PATRAS (2015-2016) ILISIAKOS AO (2016-2020) COACHING CAREER ILISIAKOS AO (2016-NOW)
- Retired: 2020

Ilias Lappas (Greek: Ηλίας Λάππας, born 11-01-1981) is a Greek water polo player and yet water polo coach. Lappas played for Greek powerhouse Olympiacos with whom he won the 2001–02 LEN Champions League in Budapest. Lappas was part of the Olympiacos squad that won the 2002 Triple Crown (LEN Champions League, Greek Championship, Greek Cup).

DISTINCIONS

• Once (1) 1st place in European Water Polo championship (Men)

• Once (1) 1st place in Hellenic Water Polo championship (A1 division-Men)

• Once (1) 1st place in Hellenic water polo cup (Men)

• Four (4) times in the 1st place in Hellenic Water Polo championship (A2 division-Men)

• Three (3) times in the 1st place in Hellenic Water Polo championship (B division-Men)

• Three (3) times in 1st place in Hellenic Water Polo championship of armed and security forces

• Participation in National Water Polo Team of Armed and Security Forces
