= Emmanouil Papadopoulos =

Emmanouil Papadopoulos (Greek: Εμμανουήλ Παπαδόπουλος) may refer to:

- Emmanouil Papadopoulos (Russian general) (died 1810), Greek officer in Imperial Russian service
- Emmanouil Papadopoulos (water polo player) (fl. 1948), competed in the 1948 Summer Olympics
