= Dimitris Kravaritis =

Greek water polo player

Personal information
- Born: March 28, 1972 (age 54) Greece
Medal record
Men's water polo
Representing Greece
European Games
Bronze medal – third place	2015 Baku	Team (coach)
- Updated on 27 August 2015

Dimitris Kravaritis (Greek: Δημήτρης Κραβαρίτης, born 28 March 1972) is a retired Greek water polo player who played his entire career for Olympiacos. He is the current head coach of Greece Junior national water polo team, whom he led to the bronze medal at the 2015 European Games at Baku and the current assistant coach of Greece men's national water polo team as well. He is also the head of Olympiacos Water Polo Academy.

As a player, Kravaritis played his entire career for Olympiacos, where he won numerous titles including the 2002 LEN Champions League. He was also a member of the Greece men's national water polo team. After his retirement, he became head of Olympiacos Academy. Besides his work at the Academy, he was assistant coach of Olympiacos under coaches Vangelis Pateros and Thodoris Vlachos. In 2014 he became assistant coach of Greece men's national water polo team and in 2015 head coach of the Greece Junior national water polo team, whom he led to the bronze medal at the 2015 European Games at Baku.
