= Giorgos Katsoulis =

Greek water polo player (1963–2023)

Personal information
- Born: 1963
- Died: 22 February 2023 (aged 59–60)

Sport
- Sport: Water polo

Giorgos Katsoulis (Greek: Γιώργος Κατσούλης pronounced [ˈjorɣos kaˈt͜sulis], 1963 – 22 February 2023) was a Greek water polo player and the assistant coach of Olympiacos Women's Water Polo Team, since 2016.

As a player, Katsoulis played for Greek powerhouse Olympiacos from 1978 to 1990. In 1988 Olympiacos Women's Water Polo Team was founded and Katsoulis became the first ever head coach of the department. He remained head coach until 1993 and under his guidance, Olympiacos women's team became one of the top powers in the Greek League. From 1992 to 2000, Katsoulis became assistant coach to many Olympiacos Men's Team world-class head coaches, such as Boris Popov, Mile Nakić and Nikola Stamenić.

In 2000 Katsoulis was appointed head coach of ANO Glyfada Women's Team and led the club to two Greek Championships (2000–01, 2001–02), the silver medal in the 2000–01 LEN Champions Cup (losing to Orizzonte Catania in the final) and the bronze medal in the 2001–02 LEN Champions Cup. In 2002 he was appointed head coach of NC Vouliagmeni Women's Team and led them to the 2002–03 LEN Trophy triumph, which was the first ever European title for the club. He also coached Vouliagmeni to the 2002–03 Greek Championship, putting an end to Glyfada's dominance after 1998. From November 2011 to 2014 he was the head coach of Ethnikos Women's Team.

In 2016-17, he returned in Olympiakos assisting Haris Pavlides, reaching the Final of the Champions Cup in Kirishi, Russia, and winning the Championship in the Greek A1 women's League.

Over the next two years, he ran his “Be a better player” project, a private Academy for improving players of all levels.

From 2020 to 2022, he worked in Panionios water polo, as a coach and technical advisor of all women age groups teams, including the senior women team, and winning a championship in 2022, with the U14 team along with coach Zinovia Karagianni.
