= Emmanouil Zerdevas =

Greek water polo player

Personal information
- Nationality: Greek
- Born: 12 August 1997 (age 29) Athens, Greece
- Height: 1.85 m (6 ft 1 in)
- Weight: 77 kg (170 lb)

Sport
- Sport: Water polo
- Handedness: Right
- Position: Goalkeeper
- Current club: Olympiacos

Senior clubs
- Years: Team
- 2015–2018: Vouliagmeni
- 2019–present: Olympiacos
Medal record
Representing Greece
Olympic Games
Silver medal – second place	2020 Tokyo	Team
World Championships
Silver medal – second place	2023 Fukuoka	Team
Bronze medal – third place	2022 Budapest	Team
European Championship
Bronze medal – third place	2026 Belgrade
FINA World League
Bronze medal – third place	2020 Tbilisi
Mediterranean Games
Silver medal – second place	2018 Tarragona
Youth World Championship
Gold medal – first place	2017 Belgrade

Emmanouil Zerdevas (born 12 August 1997) is a Greek water polo player. He competed in the 2020 Summer Olympics, where he won a silver medal as a member of the Greek team.

== Honours ==
Vouliagmeni

- Greek Cup: 2016–17

Olympiacos

- LEN Champions League runners-up : 2018–19
- Greek Championship: 2018–19, 2019–20, 2020–21, 2021–22, 2022–23, 2023–24
- Greek Cup: 2018–19, 2019–20, 2020–21, 2021–22, 2022–23, 2023–24
- Greek Super Cup: 2018, 2019, 2020

=== Individual ===
- Olympic Tournament Goalkeeper of the Tournament: 2020 Tokyo
- Greek Championship Goalkeeper of the Year: 2016–17, 2020–21
- World Championship Goalkeeper of the Tournament: 2023
- World Championship Team of the Tournament: 2023
- Member of the World Team by total-waterpolo: 2023
