= Periklis Damaskos =

Greek water polo player

Personal information
- Born: July 11, 1952 (age 73)

Sport
- Sport: Water polo

Periklis Damaskos (born 11 July 1952) is a Greek former water polo player who competed in the 1972 Summer Olympics At club level, he played for Olympiacos. After his retirement, he became a water polo coach.
