= Tamás Dala =

Hungarian water polo player

Personal information
- Nationality: Hungary
- Born: 5 June 1968 (age 58) Tatabánya
- Height: 1.80 m (5 ft 11 in)
- Weight: 82 kg (181 lb)

Sport
- Sport: Water polo

Senior clubs
- Years: Team
- ?-? 1996-97: Újpesti TE; Olympiacos
National team
- Years: Team
- ?-?: Hungary

Tamás Dala (born 5 June 1968) is a Hungarian male former water polo player. He was a member of the Hungary men's national water polo team. He competed with the team at the 1996 Summer Olympics.
