= Michalis Kouretas =

Greek water polo player

Personal information
- Born: 1965 (age 60–61) Patras, Greece

Sport
- Sport: Water polo

Michail "Michalis" Kouretas (Greek: Μιχάλης Κουρέτας, born 1965) is a retired Greek water polo player and a FINA and LEN-listed water polo referee.

Kouretas started playing water polo in Nautical Club of Patras of his native city. He was then transferred to Olympiacos, with whom he won the Greek Water Polo League top goalscorer award twice. He returned again to Nautical Club of Patras before his retirement in 1993. Kouretas was also a member of the Greece men's national water polo team.

He is a FINA and LEN-listed referee since 2003 and he has refereed numerous games in FINA and LEN competitions (FINA World Championship, FINA World League, European Championship, LEN Champions League, LEN Euro Cup).
