= Ioannis Thomakos =

Greek water polo player

Giannis Thomakos
Personal information
- Nationality: Greece
- Born: 14 March 1977 (age 49) Athens, Greece

Sport
- Sport: Water polo
- Handedness: Right
- Position: Wing

Senior clubs
- Years: Team
- 1996–1997: Panionios
- 1997–2006: Olympiacos
- 2006–2011: Panionios
- 2011–2012: NO Argostoliou
- 2012–2015: Panionios
- 2015–2016: PAOK
Medal record
Men's Water polo
Representing Greece
FINA World Cup
| Silver medal – second place | 1997 Athens | Team |
World League
| Bronze medal – third place | 2004 Long Beach | Team |

Ioannis Thomakos (born 14 March 1977) is a Greek water polo player who competed in the 2000 Summer Olympics (10th place), the 2004 Summer Olympics (4th place) and the 2008 Summer Olympics (7th place) with the Greece men's national water polo team. He was part of the national squad that won the silver medal at the 1997 World Cup in Athens. and the Bronze Medal in the 2004 World League in Long Beach.

Thomakos started his career at Panionios and in 1997 he moved to Olympiacos where he played for nine consecutive seasons (1997–2006), winning 17 major titles (1 LEN Champions League, 1 LEN Super Cup, 7 Greek Championships, 6 Greek Cups and 2 Greek Super Cups).

Thomakos was a key player in Olympiacos' 2002 Quardruple (LEN Champions League, LEN Super Cup, Greek Championship, Greek Cup all in 2002), scoring a spectacular long-distance goal in the 2002 LEN Champions League final win (9–7) against Honvéd in Budapest.

== Honours ==
=== Club ===
Olympiacos

- LEN Champions League: 2001–02; runners-up: 2000–01
- LEN Super Cup: 2002
- LEN Euro Cup runners-up: 1997–98, 1998–99
- Greek Championship: 1998–99, 1999–00, 2000–01, 2001–02, 2002–03, 2003–04, 2004–05
- Greek Cup: 1997–98, 2000–01, 2001–02, 2002–03, 2003–04, 2005–06
- Greek Super Cup: 1997, 1998

Panionios

- LEN Euro Cup runners-up: 2008–09

=== National team ===
- (silver) Silver Medal in 1997 World Cup, Athens
- (bronze) Bronze Medal in 2004 World League, Long Beach
- 4th place in 2004 Olympic Games, Athens
- 4th place in 2003 World Championship, Barcelona

== Awards ==
- Greek Championship Top scorer: 2007–2008 with Panionios

== See also ==
- Greece men's Olympic water polo team records and statistics
