= Franko Nakić =

Croatian-Greek basketball player

Personal information
- Born: June 9, 1972 (age 54) Šibenik, SR Croatia, SFR Yugoslavia
- Listed height: 6 ft 7 in (2.01 m)
- Listed weight: 200 lb (91 kg)

Career information
- Playing career: 1992–2006
- Position: Small forward
- Number: 9, 11, 12

Career history
- 1992–1998: Olympiacos
- 1998–1999: Alba Berlin
- 1999–2000: Olympiacos
- 2000–2001: Iraklis
- 2001–2002: Aris
- 2002–2003: Near East
- 2003–2004: Peristeri
- 2004: Basket Livorno
- 2004–2005: Olympia Larissa
- 2005–2006: Kolossos Rodou

Career highlights
- EuroLeague champion (1997); 5× Greek League champion (1993, 1994, 1995, 1996, 1997); 2× Greek Cup winner (1994, 1997); German League champion (1999); German Cup winner (1999)

Franko Nakić (Greek: Φράνκο Νάκιτς; born June 9, 1972) is a Croatian-Greek retired professional basketball player. Under his Greek nationality, he is known by the name of Franko Nakits.

== Early life ==
Nakić was born in Šibenik, to his father, Mile Nakić, who is a Croatian sportsman and water polo coach. He moved to Greece to live, and gained Greek citizenship.

== Professional career ==
Nakić started his career with Šibenka 1988. and 1992. he is player in Olympiacos. He played with Olympiacos from 1992 to 1998, winning 5 Greek League championships (1993, 1994, 1995, 1996, 1997) and 2 Greek Cups (1994, 1997). In 1997, Nakić won the EuroLeague championship, Greek League championship, and the Greek Cup all in the same season, thus winning the coveted Triple Crown. He also participated at two EuroLeague Finals (1994 Tel Aviv, 1995 Saragoza) and at the 1997 McDonald's Championship final against the Chicago Bulls of Michael Jordan.

In 1998, he moved to Alba Berlin, and with Alba, he won the German League championship and the German Cup in the year 1999. After the 1998-99 season, he returned to Olympiacos.

In 2000, he moved to the Greek club Iraklis. He also played for the Greek club Aris, Near East, the Italian League club Basket Livorno, and the Greek clubs Peristeri, Olympia Larissa, and Kolossos Rodou.
