= Takis Michalos =

Greek water polo player

Personal information
- Born: 3 October 1947; Ampelokipoi, Greece
- Died: 3 January 2010 (aged 62)

Sport
- Sport: Water polo

Panagiotis "Takis" Michalos (Greek: Παναγιώτης Μίχαλος; 3 October 1947 – 3 January 2010) was a Greek water polo player and coach. He was born in Ampelokipoi, Athens.

== Water polo playing career ==
=== Clubs ===
Michalos was the goalkeeper of Olympiacos, from 1962 until 1975. With Olympiacos, he won two Greek water polo championships (1969, 1971), and broke the dominance of Greek club water polo by Ethnikos.

=== National team ===
As a Greece men's national water polo team, Michalos took part in two Summer Olympics (1968, 1972), in one World Championship (1973), and in one European Cup (1970). He also took part in the Mediterranean Games in 1975.

== Water polo coaching career ==
=== Clubs ===
Michalos was the coach of ANO Glyfada, from 1979 until 1985. With ANO Glyfada, he reached the final of the Greek Water Polo Cup in 1984. From 1985 to 1986, he was the coach of Olympiacos.

=== National team ===
Ιn 1986, Michalos joined the national squads as an assistant coach, and he worked as an assistant coach and coach in the national teams from 1987, until 2002. Within the aforementioned capacities, he was present at three Olympic Games, three World Championships, seven European Championships, four World Cups, and four Mediterranean Games. He led the Greek youth national team to the bronze medal in 1997. He was the coach of the Greek women's national team in 2000, and the Greek men's national team, in the summer of 2002.

== Personal ==
Michalos died in 2010. He had two sons, Nikos and Manos. Nikos is a professional basketball player, and Manos is a journalist.

== See also ==
- Greece men's Olympic water polo team records and statistics
- List of men's Olympic water polo tournament goalkeepers
