= Evangelos Delakas =

Greek water polo player

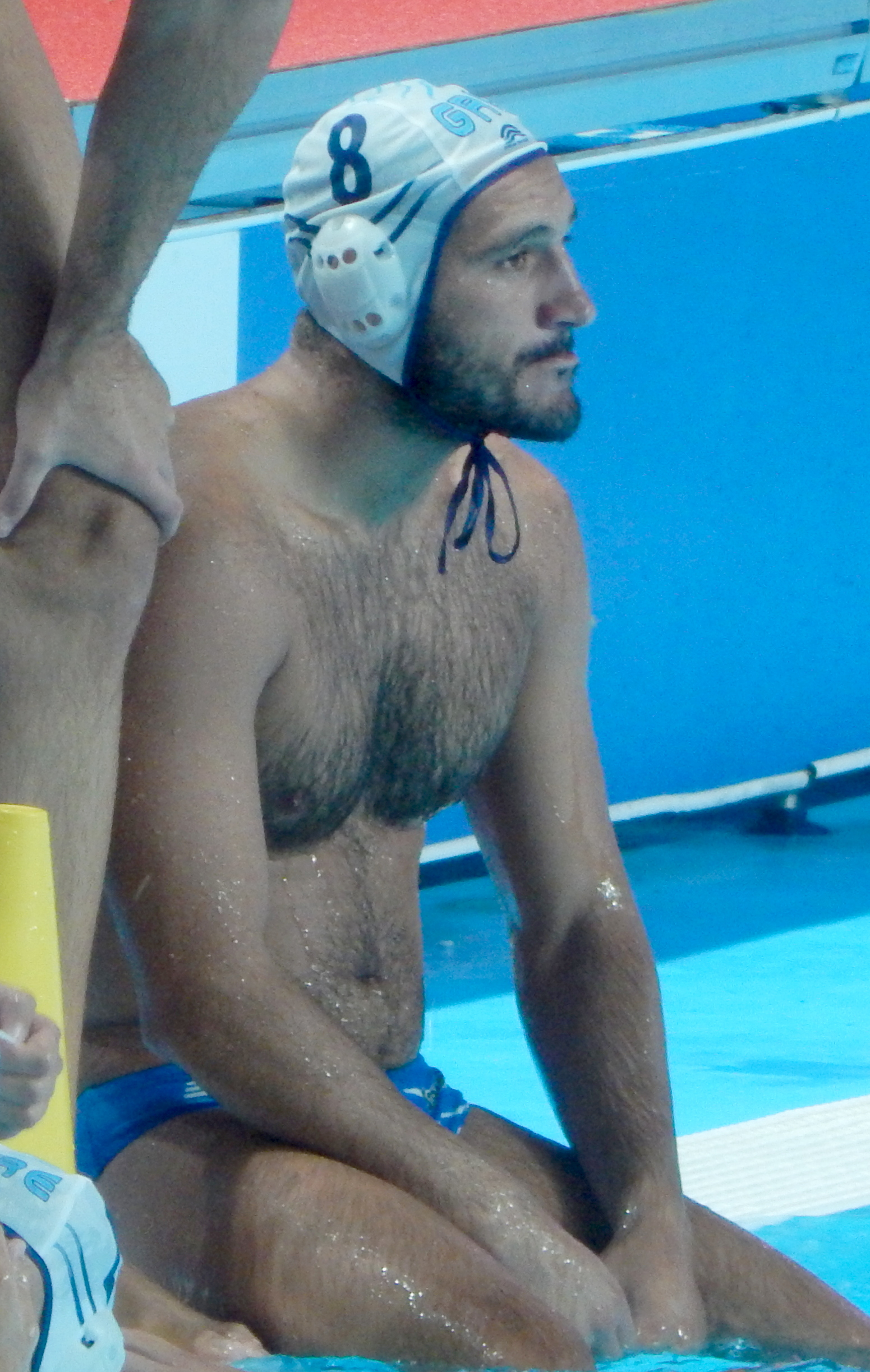
- Delakas at the 2015 World Championships

Personal information
- Full name: Evangelos Ioannis Delakas
- Nationality: Greek
- Born: 8 February 1985 (age 41) Athens, Greece
- Height: 189 cm (6 ft 2 in)
- Weight: 90 kg (198 lb)

Sport
- Sport: Water polo
- Handedness: R
- Position: Point
- Number: 8

Senior clubs
- Years: Team
- 2004–2018: Olympiacos
National team
- Years: Team
- 2012–2016: Greece
Medal record
Representing Greece
World Championships
Bronze medal – third place	2015 Kazan	Team
FINA World League
Bronze medal – third place	2016 Huizhou	Team
Mediterranean Games
Bronze medal – third place	2013 Mersin	Team
- Updated on 12 January 2017

Evangelos Ioannis Delakas (Greek: Ευάγγελος Ιωάννης Δελακάς, born 8 February 1985) is a retired Greek water polo player and the current assistant coach of Greek powerhouse Olympiacos. As a player, Delakas won a bronze medal at the 2015 World Championships and competed at the 2012 and 2016 Olympics. He played for Olympiacos for 14 years (2004–2018) and won 12 Greek Championships, 11 Greek Cups and the 2017–18 LEN Champions League with the club.

Apart from water polo, Delakas runs an art gallery in Kolonaki, together with his wife Fay and his father-in-law.

== See also ==
- List of World Aquatics Championships medalists in water polo
