= Panagiotis Mathioudakis =

Greek water polo player

Personal information
- Born: 1944 (age 80–81); Piraeus, Greece

Sport
- Sport: Water polo

Panagiotis "Takis" Mathioudakis (born 1944) is a Greek former water polo player who competed in the 1968 Summer Olympics. At club level, he played for Olympiacos.
