= Stefan Mitrović (water polo) =

Serbian water polo player

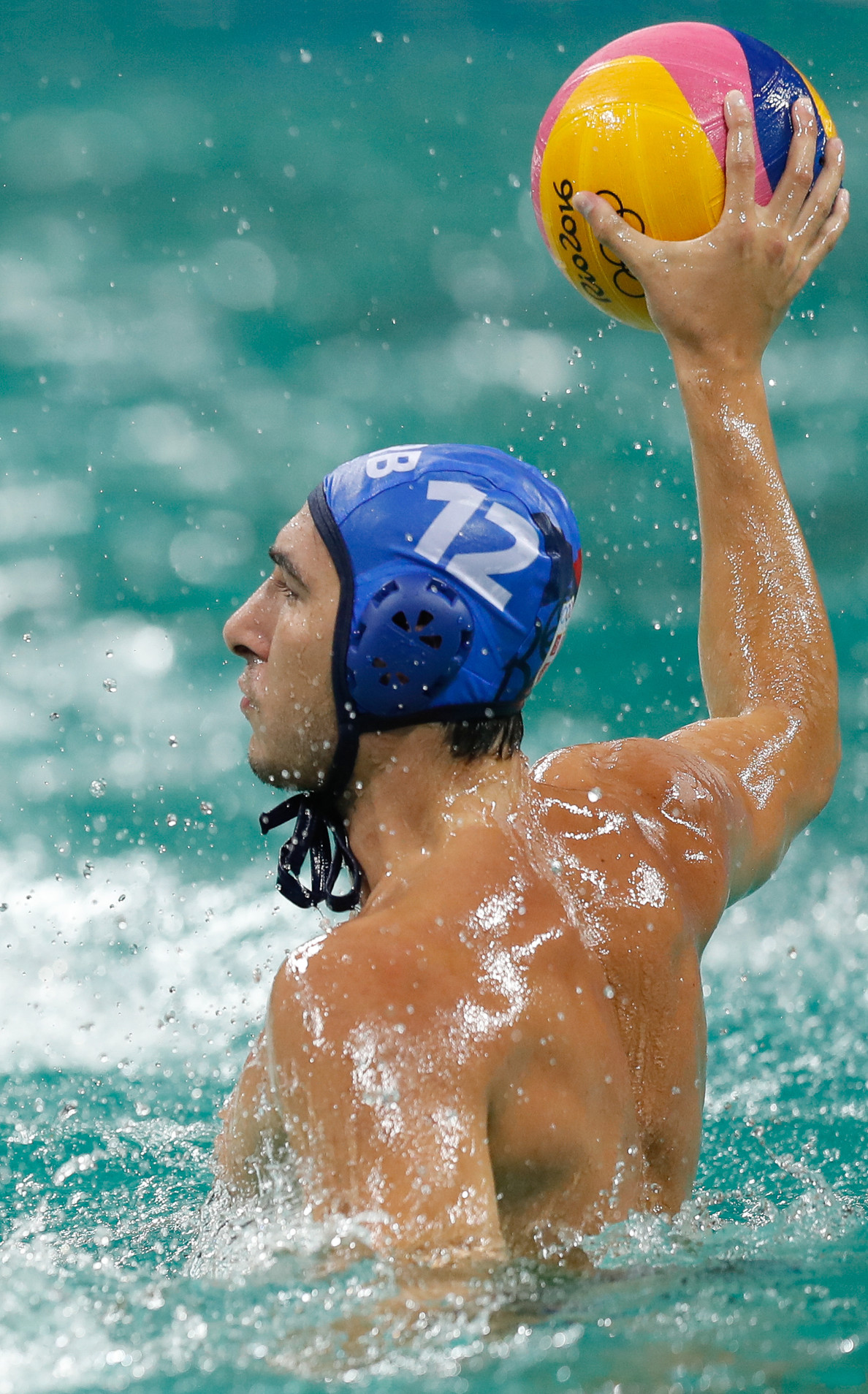
- Mitrović at the 2016 Summer Olympics

Personal information
- Nationality: Serbian
- Born: 29 March 1988 (age 38) Belgrade, SR Serbia, SFR Yugoslavia
- Height: 1.94 m (6 ft 4 in)
- Weight: 91 kg (201 lb)

Sport
- Sport: Water polo
- Current club: Partizan

Senior clubs
- Years: Team
- 2006–2013: Partizan
- 2013–2016: Szolnoki
- 2016–2019: Ferencvárosi
- 2019–2020: Olympiacos
- 2020: Apollon Smyrnis
- 2021–present: Partizan
Medal record
Men's water polo
Representing Serbia
Olympic Games
Gold medal – first place	2016 Rio de Janeiro	Team
Gold medal – first place	2020 Tokyo	Team
Bronze medal – third place	2012 London	Team
World Championship
Gold medal – first place	2009 Rome	Team
Gold medal – first place	2015 Kazan	Team
Silver medal – second place	2011 Shanghai	Team
Bronze medal – third place	2017 Budapest	Team
European Championship
Gold medal – first place	2012 Eindhoven
Gold medal – first place	2014 Budapest
Gold medal – first place	2016 Belgrade
Gold medal – first place	2018 Barcelona
Bronze medal – third place	2010 Zagreb
FINA World League
Gold medal – first place	2007 Berlin
Gold medal – first place	2010 Niš
Gold medal – first place	2011 Firenze
Gold medal – first place	2013 Chelyabinsk
Gold medal – first place	2014 Dubai
Gold medal – first place	2015 Bergamo
Gold medal – first place	2016 Huizhou
Gold medal – first place	2017 Ruza
Gold medal – first place	2019 Belgrade
Bronze medal – third place	2009 Podgorica
FINA World Cup
Gold medal – first place	2010 Oreada
Bronze medal – third place	2018 Berlin
Mediterranean Games
Gold medal – first place	2009 Pescara
Gold medal – first place	2018 Tarragona

Stefan Mitrović (Serbian Cyrillic: Стефан Митровић; born 29 March 1988) is a Serbian water polo center back for Partizan. He was a member of the Serbia men's national water polo teams that won a bronze medal at the 2012 Olympics and gold medals in 2016 and 2020. He was pulled out of the 2008 Beijing Olympics team after suffering injuries in a motorcycle accident. He won the world title in 2009 and 2015 and the European title in 2012, 2014, 2016, and 2018.

== Club career ==
=== Partizan Raiffeisen ===
On 22 October 2011. Mitrović scored three goals in the first round of the Euroleague Group, in an 8–9 loss to Szeged Beton VE. On 26 November Mitrović scored a goal in a 9–6 Euroleague third round win over ZF Eger in Belgrade. Mitrović scored three goals on 14 December in the fourth round of the Euroleague, in the 12–8 second defeat to ZF Eger. On 8 February Stefan Mitrović scored a goal for Partizan in the fifth round of the Euroleague Group in which his team won without much problem 9–5 against TEVA-Vasas-UNIQA. On 15 February Mitrović scored his first goal of the Serbian National Championship season, in the second round of the "A League", in an 8–6 win against Crvena Zvezda VET. On 1 March Mitrović scored a goal against VK Vojvodina in a 10–9 win in the "A League" fourth round.

=== Szolnoki Dózsa-KÖZGÉP ===
Starting with the 2013–2014 season he played for Szolnoki Dózsa-KÖZGÉP. He was part of the team for three seasons, until 2016, winning the national championship in the last two out of the three occasions.

=== Ferencvárosi TC ===
Starting with the 2016–2017 season he will be playing for Ferencvárosi TC alongside other signings from his previous team such as Dániel Varga, Norbert Madaras and Márton Tóth.

=== Olympiacos ===
On 25 June 2019, he signed for Greek powerhouse Olympiacos.

== National career ==
On 16 January, at the European Championship Mitrović scored a goal in the first game in an 8–5 win against Spain. Mitrović was a big part of his team on 19 January, in a big 15–12 victory against the defending European champions Croatia. He scored two goals for his team. On 27 January Mitrović scored two goals in a semifinal 12–8 victory over Italy. Stefan Mitrović won the 2012 European Championship on 29 January. He scored two goals alongside his captain Vanja Udovičić in the final against Montenegro which his national team won by 9–8. Later that year he won a bronze medal at the 2012 Olympics.

== Honours ==
VK Partizan

- LEN Champions League: 2010–11
- Serbian Championship: 2006–07, 2007–08, 2008–09, 2009–10, 2010–11, 2011–12
- Serbian Cup: 2006–07, 2007–08, 2008–09, 2009–10, 2010–11, 2011–12

Szolnoki

- Hungarian Championship: 2014–15, 2015–16
- Hungarian Cup: 2014
- Hungarian Super Cup: 2016

Ferencvaros

- LEN Champions League: 2018–19
- LEN Super Cup: 2018
- LEN Euro Cup: 2016–17, 2017–18
- Hungarian Championships: 2017–18, 2018–19
- Hungarian Cup: 2018
- Hungarian Super Cup: 2017, 2018

Olympiacos

- Greek Championship: 2019–20
- Greek Cup: 2019–20
- Greek Super Cup: 2019

== Awards ==
- Hungarian Championship Top Scorer: 2013–14

== Personal life ==
Mitrović is married to Ilinka. In November 2024, Mitrović joined the ruling populist Serbian Progressive Party.

== See also ==
- Serbia men's Olympic water polo team records and statistics
- List of Olympic champions in men's water polo
- List of Olympic medalists in water polo (men)
- List of world champions in men's water polo
- List of World Aquatics Championships medalists in water polo
