= Panagiotis Provatopoulos =

Greek swimmer

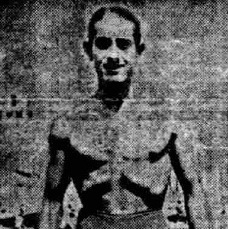
- Takis Provatopoulos

Personal information
- Born: 1914

Sport
- Sport: Swimming

Panagiotis Provatopoulos (born 1914) was a Greek swimmer and water polo player. He competed in the men's 4 × 200 metre freestyle relay at the 1936 Summer Olympics and the water polo tournament at the 1948 Summer Olympics. At club level, he played for Olympiacos.
