= Alexandros Monastiriotis =

Greek water polo player (born 1924)

Personal information
- Born: 1924 Piraeus, Greece

Sport
- Sport: Water polo

Alexandros "Alekos" Monastiriotis (Greek: Αλέξανδρος Μοναστηριώτης; born 1924) was a Greek water polo player. He competed in the 1948 Summer Olympics. At club level, he played for Olympiacos.

== See also ==
- Greece men's Olympic water polo team records and statistics
- List of men's Olympic water polo tournament goalkeepers
