= Arsenis Maroulis =

Greek water polo player

Personal information
- Born: 1978 (age 46–47)

Sport
- Sport: Water polo

Arsenis Maroulis (Greek: Αρσένης Μαρούλης; born 1978) is a retired Greek water polo player and water polo coach, currently coaching G.S. Peristeriou. Maroulis played for Greek powerhouse Olympiacos with whom he won the 2001–02 LEN Champions League in Budapest, being also runner-up of the 2000–01 LEN Champions League in Dubrovnik.

Maroulis was part of the Olympiacos squad that won the 2002 Triple Crown (LEN Champions League, Greek Championship, Greek Cup).
