= Georgios Palikaris =

Greek water polo player (born 1946)

Personal information
- Born: 1946 (age 78–79); Piraeus, Greece

Sport
- Sport: Water polo

Georgios Palikaris (born 1946) is a Greek former water polo player who competed in the 1968 Summer Olympics. At club level, he played for Olympiacos.
