= Thomas Khatzis =

Greek water polo player

Themis Chatzis
Personal information
- Nationality: Greece
- Born: 23 July 1972 (age 54) Greece

Sport
- Sport: Water polo

Senior clubs
- Years: Team
- 1992–2004: Olympiacos
Medal record
Men's Water polo
Representing Greece

Thomas "Themis" Khatzis (born 23 July 1972) is a Greek former water polo player who competed in the 1996 Summer Olympics (6th place) and the 2000 Summer Olympics (10th place) with the Greece men's national water polo team.

Khatzis started his career at Poseidon Ilision and in 1992 he moved to Olympiacos where he played for twelve consecutive seasons (1992–2004), winning 20 major titles (1 LEN Euroleague, 1 LEN Supercup, 9 Greek Championships, 7 Greek Cups and 2 Greek Supercups).

Khatzis was a key player in Olympiacos' 2002 Quardruple (LEN Champions League, LEN Super Cup, Greek Championship, Greek Cup all in 2002), scoring 2 goals in the 2002 LEN Champions League final win (9–7) against Honvéd in Budapest. He was the captain of Olympiacos in the 2002 LEN Super Cup win against Vasas (6–5) in Budapest.

== Honours ==
=== Club ===
Olympiacos

- LEN Euroleague (1): 2001–02
- LEN Super Cup (1): 2002
- Greek Championship (9): 1992–93, 1994–95, 1995–96, 1998–99, 1999–00, 2000–01, 2001–02, 2002–03, 2003–04
- Greek Cup (7): 1992–93, 1996–97, 1997–98, 2000–01, 2001–02, 2002–03, 2003–04
- Greek Super Cup (2): 1997, 1998

=== National team ===
- 6th place in 1996 Olympic Games, Atlanta
