= Ioannis Palios =

Greek water polo player

Personal information
- Born: June 20, 1946 (age 78); Piraeus, Greece

Sport
- Sport: Water polo

Ioannis "Giannis" Palios (born 20 June 1946) is a Greek retired water polo player who competed in the 1968 and the 1972 Summer Olympics. Born in Piraeus, he played at the club level for Olympiacos.
