= Efstathios Sarantos =

Greek water polo player

Personal information
- Born: May 16, 1952 (age 72)

Sport
- Sport: Water polo

Efstathios "Stathis" Sarantos (born 16 May 1952) is a Greek former water polo player who competed in the 1972 Summer Olympics and the 1978 FINA World Championship. At club level, he played for Olympiacos.
