= Georgios Psykhos =

Greek water polo player

Giorgos Psychos
Personal information
- Nationality: Greece
- Born: 5 February 1973 (age 53) Greece

Sport
- Sport: Water polo
- Position: Defender

Senior clubs
- Years: Team
- -1999: NC Vouliagmeni
- 1999-2006: Olympiacos
Medal record
Men's Water polo
Representing Greece
FINA World Cup
Silver medal – second place	1997 Athens	Team

Georgios Psykhos (born 5 February 1973) is a Greek former water polo player who competed in the 1996 Summer Olympics (6th place), the 2000 Summer Olympics (10th place) with the Greece men's national water polo team. He was part of the Greece national team that won the silver medal at the 1997 World Cup in Athens.

At club level, Psykhos had a successful career, playing most notably for Olympiacos and NC Vouliagmeni. As a member of Olympiacos (1999–2006), Psykhos won 1 LEN Champions League, 1 LEN Super Cup, 6 Greek Championships and 5 Greek Cups. He was a key player in Olympiacos' 2002 Quardruple (LEN Champions League, LEN Super Cup, Greek Championship, Greek Cup all in 2002). As a member of NC Vouliagmeni, Psykhos won the 1997 LEN Cup Winners' Cup.

== Honours ==
=== Club ===
Olympiacos

- LEN Champions League (1): 2001–02
- LEN Super Cup (1): 2002
- Greek Championship (6): 2000, 2001, 2002, 2003, 2004, 2005
- Greek Cup (5): 2001, 2002, 2003, 2004, 2006

Vouliagmeni

- LEN Cup Winners' Cup (1) : 1996–97
- Greek Cup (1): 1996

=== National team ===
- (silver) Silver Medal in 1997 World Cup, Athens
- 6th place in 1996 Olympic Games, Atlanta
