= Nikolaos Kaloudis =

Greek football player

Nikolaos Kaloudis (Greek: Νικόλαος Καλούδης; born 1899, date of death unknown) was a Greek football player who played for the club Piraikos Enosi. He was member of the national team for the 1920 Olympic Games in Antwerp.
