= Thodoris Vlachos =

Greek water polo player

Personal information
- Born: July 9, 1969 (age 57) Volos, Greece

Sport
- Sport: Water polo

Senior clubs
- Years: Team
- –1989: NO Volos & Argonautes
- 1989–1998: Olympiacos
- 1998–1999: PAOK
- 1999–2000: Panathinaikos
National team
- Years: Team
- –: Greece

Teams coached
- 2000–2005: Olympiacos (assistant)
- 2005–2011: Palaio Faliro
- 2011–2022: Olympiacos
- 2014–: Greece
Medal record
Men's water polo
Representing Greece (as head coach)
Olympic Games
| Silver medal – second place | 2020 Tokyo | Team |
World Championships
| Silver medal – second place | 2023 Fukuoka | Team |
| Bronze medal – third place | 2015 Kazan | Team |
| Bronze medal – third place | 2022 Budapest | Team |
FINA World League
| Bronze medal – third place | 2016 Huizhou | Team |
| Bronze medal – third place | 2020 Tbilisi | Team |
Mediterranean Games
| Silver medal – second place | 2018 Tarragona | Team |
- Updated on 12 January 2017

Theodoros "Thodoris" Vlachos (Greek: Θοδωρής Βλάχος; born 9 July 1969, in Volos) is a retired Greek water polo player and the current coach of the Greece men's national water polo team. He was named the Greek Coach of the Year, for the years 2021 and 2023.

As a player, Vlachos played for Olympiacos from 1989 to 1998, winning numerous titles. He was also a member of the Greece men's national water polo team. After his retirement, he became assistant coach of Olympiacos under coaches Dragan Matutinović, Zoltán Kásás and Veselin Đuho. He became Olympiacos head coach in 2011, following a successful stint as head coach in Palaio Faliro. Under his guidance, Olympiacos won the 2017–18 LEN Champions League in Genoa, after a 9–7 win against home team Pro Recco in the final and completed a Triple Crown, winning the season's all available titles. Besides the LEN Champions League and the Triple Crown, he has also coached Olympiacos to 10 consecutive Greek League titles (2013, 2014, 2015, 2016, 2017, 2018, 2019, 2020, 2021, 2022) 9 Greek Cups (2013, 2014, 2015, 2016, 2018, 2019, 2020, 2021, 2022) and 7 domestic Doubles.

In 2014, he became head coach of Greece men's national water polo team, whom he led to the bronze medal at the 2015 World Aquatics Championships in Kazan and the bronze medal at the 2016 World League in Huizhou.

Vlachos, as the head coach of Greece's national water polo team, has attained the silver medal in the Olympic Games of Tokyo in 2020, and also the silver medal in the World Championships at Fukuoka in 2023.

== Honours ==
=== Club ===
Olympiacos

- LEN Champions League: 2017–18; runners-up: 2015–16, 2018–19
- Greek Championship: 2012–13, 2013–14, 2014–15, 2015–16, 2016–17, 2017–18, 2018–19, 2019–20, 2020–21, 2021–22
- Greek Cup: 2012–13, 2013–14, 2014–15, 2015–16, 2017–18, 2018–19, 2019–20, 2020–21, 2021–22
- Greek Super Cup: 2018, 2019, 2020

=== National team ===
- (silver) Silver Medal in 2020 Olympic Games, Tokyo
- (silver) Silver Medal in 2023 World Championship, Fukuoka
- (silver) Silver Medal in 2018 Mediterranean Games, Tarragona
- (bronze) Bronze Medal in 2015 World Championship, Kazan
- (bronze) Bronze Medal in 2016 World League, Huizhou
- (bronze) Bronze Medal in 2020 World League, Tbilisi
- 4th place in 2016 European Championship, Belgrade
- 4th place in 2017 World Championship, Budapest
- 6th place in 2016 Olympic Games, Rio

== Awards ==
- PSAT Awards Coach of the Year: 2021
- PSAT Awards Coach of the Year: 2023
