= Antonios Vlontakis =

Greek water polo player

Antonis Vlontakis
Personal information
- Nationality: Greece
- Born: 10 October 1975 (age 51) New Jersey, United States

Sport
- Sport: Water polo
- Position: Center forward

Senior clubs
- Years: Team
- –1997 1997–2002 2002–2008 2008–2009 2009–2011 2011–2012 2012–2013: NO Chania; Olympiacos; Ethnikos Piraeus; Panionios; Olympiacos; NC Chios; NO Chania
Medal record
Men's Water polo
Representing Greece
World Championships
Bronze medal – third place	2005 Montreal	Team competition
World League
Bronze medal – third place	2004 Long Beach	Team competition

Antonios "Antonis" Vlontakis (born 10 October 1975) is a retired Greek water polo player. A long-standing member of the Greece national water polo team, Vlontakis competed in the 2000 Summer Olympics (10th place), the 2004 Summer Olympics (4th place), and the 2008 Summer Olympics (7th place). He was part of the Greece men's national water polo team that won the Bronze Medal in the 2005 World Championship in Montreal and the Bronze Medal in the 2004 World League in Long Beach.

Vlontakis started his career at NO Chania and in 1997 he moved to Olympiacos where he had a successful career (1997–2002, 2009–2011), winning 1 LEN Champions League (2002), 5 Greek Championships (1999, 2000, 2001, 2002, 2010), 4 Greek Cups (1998, 2001, 2002, 2010) and 2 Greek Supercups (1997, 1998). He was a key player of the Olympiacos team that won the 2002 Triple Crown (LEN Champions League, Greek Championship, Greek Cup).

== Honours ==
=== Club ===
Ethnikos

- Greek Championship (1): 2006
- Greek Cup (1): 2005

Olympiacos

- LEN Champions League (1): 2001–02
- Greek Championship (5): 1999, 2000, 2001, 2002, 2010
- Greek Cup (4): 1998, 2001, 2002, 2010
- Greek Super Cup (2): 1997, 1998

=== National team ===
- (bronze) Bronze Medal in 2005 World Championship, Montreal
- (bronze) Bronze Medal in 2004 World League, Long Beach
- 4th place in 2004 Olympic Games, Athens
- 4th place in 2003 World Championship, Barcelona

== See also ==
- List of World Aquatics Championships medalists in water polo
