= Georgios Dervisis =

Greek water polo player

Personal information
- Born: 30 October 1994 (age 31) Athens, Greece
- Height: 1.95 m (6 ft 5 in)
- Weight: 92 kg (203 lb)

Sport
- Country: Greece
- Sport: Water polo
- Club: Olympiacos
Medal record
Men's water polo
Representing Greece
Olympic Games
Silver medal – second place	2020 Tokyo	Team
World Championships
Silver medal – second place	2023 Fukuoka	Team
Bronze medal – third place	2015 Kazan	Team
Bronze medal – third place	2022 Budapest	Team
FINA World League
Bronze medal – third place	2016 Huizhou
Bronze medal – third place	2020 Huizhou
Mediterranean Games
Silver medal – second place	2018 Tarragona
Youth World Championship
Bronze medal – third place	2011 Volos
Youth European Championship
Silver medal – second place	2010 Stuttgart

Georgios Dervisis (Greek: Γιώργος Δερβίσης, born 30 October 1994) is a Greek water polo player. He was part of the Greek team winning the bronze medal at the 2015 World Aquatics Championships.

He was a member of the team that competed for Greece at the 2016 Summer Olympics. They finished in 6th place.

He played for Greek powerhouse Olympiacos, with whom he won the 2017–18 LEN Champions League.

== See also ==
- List of World Aquatics Championships medalists in water polo
