= Athanasios Platanitis =

Greek water polo player

Personal information
- Born: February 28, 1974 (age 51)

Sport
- Sport: Water polo

Athanasios "Sakis" Platanitis (Greek: Σάκης Πλατανίτης, born 28 February 1974) is a retired Greek water polo player who played for Olympiacos. He won numerous titles with Olympiacos, including the 2002 LEN Champions League and the 2002 LEN European Super Cup. He is currently a coach at Olympiacos Water Polo Academy.
