= Mile Nakić =

Croatian water polo player and coach

Personal information
- Full name: Ante Nakić
- Born: 8 January 1942 (age 84) Šibenik, Kingdom of Yugoslavia

Sport
- Sport: Water polo

Teams coached
- Years: Team
- 1967–1978: VK Šibenik
- 1978–1979: Olympiacos
- 1980–1981: VK Biograd
- 1980–1981: Yugoslavia (juniors)
- 1983–1984: Yugoslavia
- 1984–1985: Chios
- 1985–1986: Olympiacos
- 1986–1990: Glyfada
- 1992–1995: Greece
- 1998–1999: Chalkida
- 2001: Iran
- 2002–2004: Iran
- 2002: Al-Qadisiyah
- 2005–2006: Slovakia
- 2007–2008: Slovakia
- 2009–2010: Al-Qadisiyah

Ante "Mile" Nakić (born 8 January 1942) is a Croatian former professional renowned water polo coach and water polo player. He worked as the head coach of the Yugoslavia national team from 1982 to 1983, while from 1992 to 1995 he coached the Greece national team. At a club level, he successfully coached Olympiacos, Glyfada and VK Šibenik. He is the father of the renowned basketball player Franko Nakić.

== Playing career ==
As a player, Nakić played for ten years (1957–1967) for his home town team VK Šibenik.

== Coaching career ==
After his retirement, Nakić became the head coach of VK Šibenik for eleven years (1967–1978). He then moved to Greece as the head coach for Olympiacos (1978–1979). In 1980–81 he coached Biograd, as well as the junior national team of Yugoslavia. His work earned him the position of the head coach of Yugoslavia men's national water polo team in 1983. He resigned in spring 1984, just two months before the 1984 Summer Olympics and he was replaced by Ratko Rudić. Yugoslavia went on to win the Olympic Gold Medal.

In 1984–85 he coached Chios and the next season (1985–86) he returned to Olympiacos for his second tenure at the club as the head coach. In 1986 he became the head coach of Glyfada and led the club to four Greek Championships (1986, 1987, 1989, 1990) and three Greek Cups (1986, 1987, 1989). From 1992 to 1995 he was appointed the head coach of Greece men's national water polo team. After his stint in the Greece men's national water polo team, he returned to Olympiacos for his third tenure in the club and coached the Reds to two Greek Championships (1995, 1996). He also coached Chalkida (1998–1999), Iran men's national water polo team (2001, 2002–2004), Al-Qadisiyah in Saudi Arabia (2002, 2009–2010) and Slovakia men's national water polo team (2005–2006, 2007–2008).
