= Emmanouil Papadopoulos (water polo) =

Greek water polo player

Sport
- Sport: Water polo

Emmanouil "Manolis" Papadopoulos (Greek: Εμμανουήλ "Μπάμπη" Παπαδόπουλος; was a Greek water polo player. He competed in the 1948 Summer Olympics. At club level, he played for Olympiacos.
