= Nikolaos Venetopoulos =

Greek water polo player

Personal information
- Born: April 12, 1969 (age 57) Thessaloniki, Greece

Sport
- Sport: Water polo

Nikolaos Venetopoulos (born 12 April 1969) is a Greek former water polo player who competed in the 1988 Summer Olympics and in the 1992 Summer Olympics.
