= Evangelos Koskinas =

Greek swimmer

Personal information
- Nationality: Greek
- Born: 10 May 1959 (age 67) Drapetsona, Greece

Sport
- Sport: Swimming

Evangelos Koskinas (born 10 May 1959) is a Greek swimmer. He competed in three events at the 1980 Summer Olympics.
