= Andreas Gounas =

Greek water polo player

Personal information
- Born: August 26, 1957 (age 67); Piraeus, Greece

Sport
- Sport: Water polo

Andreas Gounas (born 26 August 1957) is a Greek former water polo player who competed in the 1980 Summer Olympics and in the 1984 Summer Olympics.
