= Evangelos Pateros =

Greek water polo player

Personal information
- Born: October 26, 1962 (age 62)

Sport
- Sport: Water polo

Evangelos Pateros (born 26 October 1962) is a Greek former water polo player who competed in the 1988 Summer Olympics and in the 1992 Summer Olympics.
