= Greek Water Polo Super Cup =

Water polo club competition

- Sport: Water Polo
- Founded: 1996
- No. of teams: 2
- Country: Greece
- Most recent champions: Olympiacos (2020)
- Most titles: Olympiacos (5)

The Greek Water Polo Super Cup is a Water Polo club competition in Greece since 1996. It is an annual match contested between the Water Polo Champion of the Greek League and the Cup's Winner. The matches take place in different cities every year. The competition was held for three consecutive years, between 1996 and 1998. The next years the competition stopped, and it restarted in 2018. Olympiacos has the most cups, and Vouliagmeni follows.

== The matches ==
Year	Winner	Score	Finalist	Location	Source
1996	NC Vouliagmeni	10 - 7	Olympiacos	Athens	
1997	Olympiacos	10 - 5	NC Vouliagmeni	Athens	
1998	Olympiacos	6 - 5	NC Vouliagmeni	Athens	
1999-2017	Not held				
2018	Olympiacos	11 - 4	ANO Glyfada	Athens	
2019	Olympiacos	11 - 5	NC Vouliagmeni	Piraeus	
2020	Olympiacos	21 - 6	Ethnikos Piraeus	Piraeus	

== Performance by club ==
Club	Winners	Runners-up	Years won	Years Runners-up
Olympiacos	5	1	1997, 1998, 2018, 2019, 2020	1996
NC Vouliagmeni	1	3	1996	1997, 1998, 2019
ANO Glyfada	-	1	-	2018
Ethnikos Piraeus	-	1	-	2020
