= Konstantinos Mourikis =

Greek water polo player

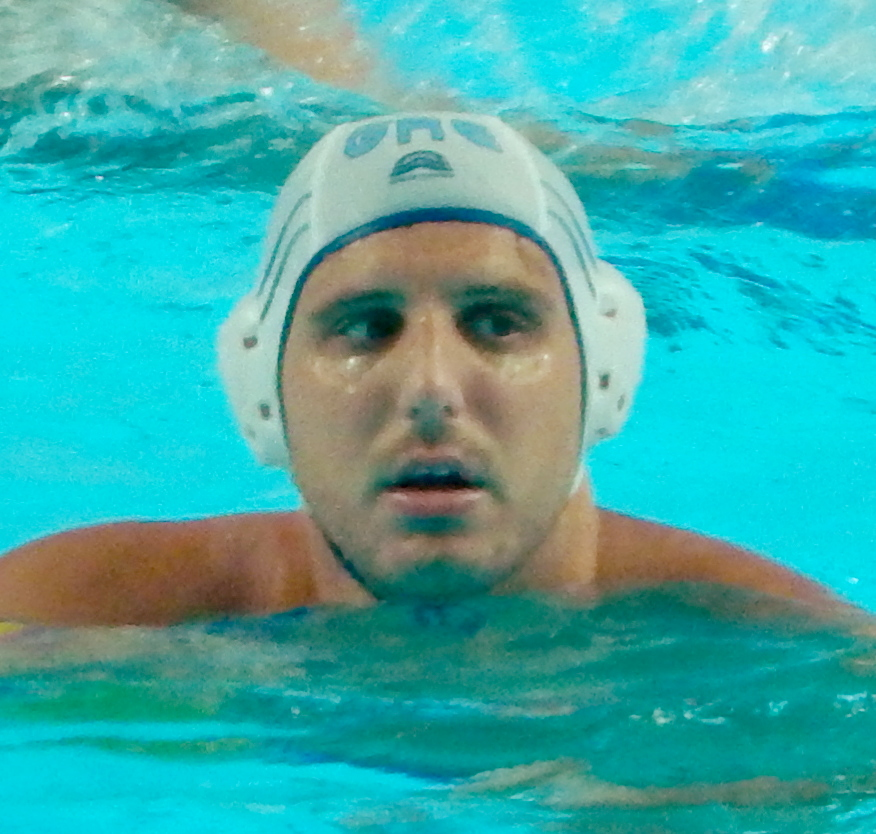
- Mourikis in 2015

Personal information
- Nationality: Greek
- Born: 11 July 1988 (age 38) Marousi, Greece
- Height: 198 cm (78 in)
- Weight: 109 kg (240 lb)

Sport
- Sport: Water polo
- Handedness: Right
- Position: Centre forward
- Current club: Panionios

Senior clubs
- Years: Team
- 2006–2011: Panionios
- 2011–2023: Olympiacos
- 2023–: Panionios
Medal record
Men's water polo
Representing Greece
Olympic Games
Silver medal – second place	2020 Tokyo	Team
World Championships
Bronze medal – third place	2015 Kazan	Team
FINA World League
Bronze medal – third place	2016 Huizhou	Team
Bronze medal – third place	2020 Tbilisi	Team
Mediterranean Games
Silver medal – second place	2018 Tarragona	Team
Bronze medal – third place	2013 Mersin	Team
- Updated on 2 August 2018

Konstantinos Mourikis (born 11 July 1988) is a Greek water polo player. He was part of the Greek team that won the bronze medal at the 2015 World Championship and the bronze medal at the 2016 World League and 2020 World League

At the 2012 Summer Olympics, he competed for the Greece men's national water polo team in the men's event.

He was a member of the team that competed for Greece at the 2016 Summer Olympics. They finished in 6th place.

He plays for Greek powerhouse Olympiacos, with whom he won the 2017–18 LEN Champions League.

== Honours ==
=== Club ===
Panionios

- LEN Euro Cup runners-up: 2008–09, 2010–11

Olympiacos

- LEN Champions League: 2017–18; runners-up: 2015–16, 2018–19
- Greek Championship: 2012–13, 2013–14, 2014–15, 2015–16, 2016–17, 2017–18, 2018–19, 2019–20, 2020–21, 2021–22, 2022–23
- Greek Cup: 2012–13, 2013–14, 2014–15, 2015–16, 2017–18, 2018–19, 2019–20, 2020–21, 2021–22, 2022–23
- Greek Super Cup: 2018, 2019, 2020

=== National team ===
- (silver) Silver Medal in Olympic games 2020, Tokyo
- (silver) Silver Medal in 2018 Mediterranean Games, Tarragona
- (bronze) Bronze Medal in 2013 Mediterranean Games, Mersin
- (bronze) Bronze Medal in 2015 World Championship, Kazan
- (bronze) Bronze Medal in 2016 World League, Huizhou
- (bronze) Bronze Medal in 2020 World League, Tbilisi
- 4th place in 2016 European Championship, Belgrade
- 4th place in 2017 World Championship, Hungary
- 6th place in 2016 Olympic Games, Rio

== See also ==
- List of World Aquatics Championships medalists in water polo
