= Alexandros Gounas =

Greek water polo player

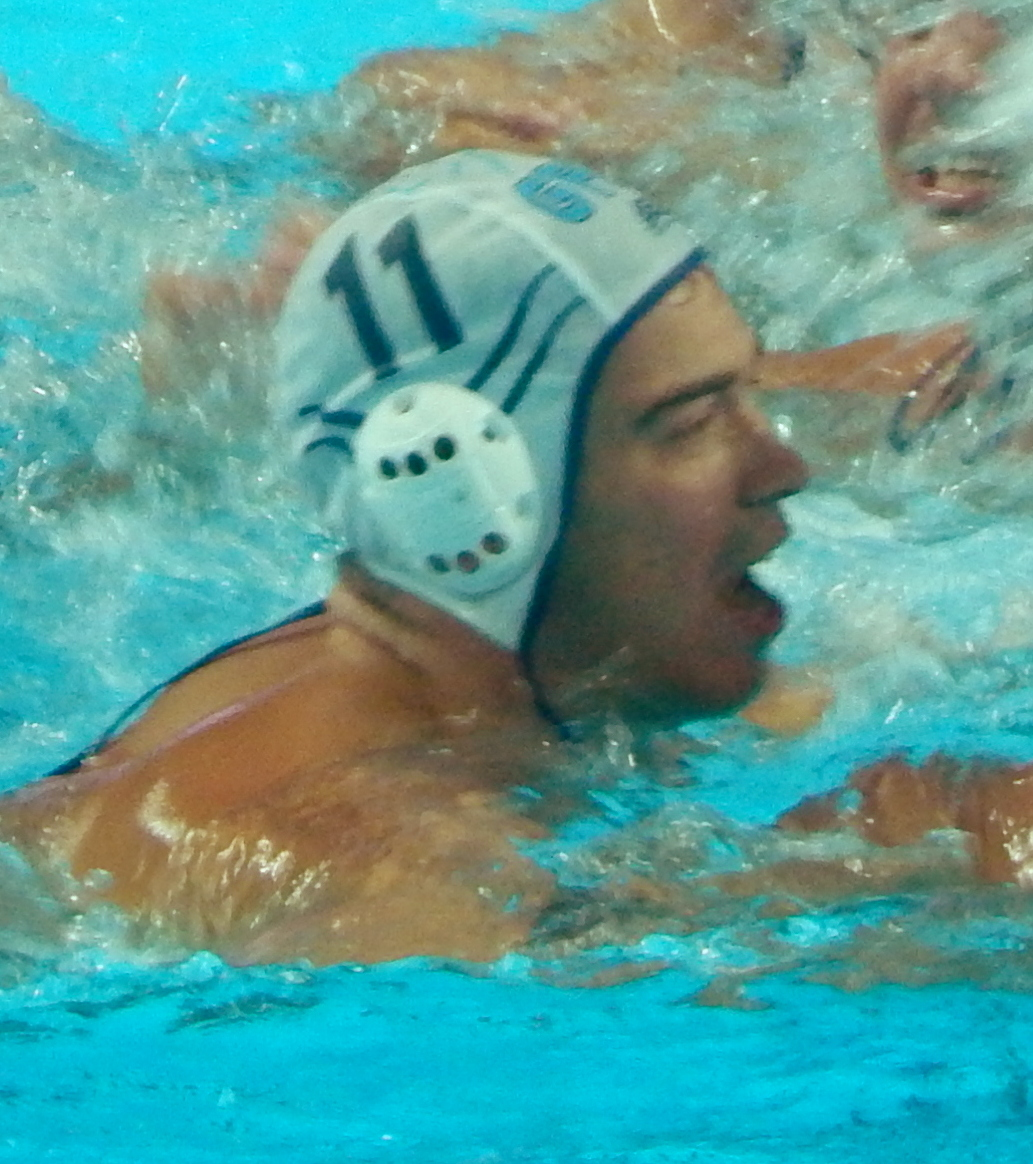
- Gounas at the 2015 World Championships

Personal information
- Full name: Alexandros Evgenios Gounas
- Born: 3 October 1989 (age 37) Greece
- Height: 180 cm (5 ft 11 in)
- Weight: 74 kg (163 lb)

Sport
- Sport: Water polo
- Handedness: Right
- Position: Wing / Driver
- Current club: Appolon Smyrnis
- Number: 10

Senior clubs
- Years: Team
- 1999–2004: Vouliagmeni
- 2004–2008: Glyfada
- 2008–2013: Vouliagmeni
- 2013–2016: Olympiacos
- 2016–2017: Savona
- 2017–2020: Olympiacos
- 2020–2022: Appolon Smyrnis
- 2022–: Panionios
Medal record
Representing Greece
World Championships
Bronze medal – third place	2015 Kazan	Team
FINA World League
Bronze medal – third place	2016 Huizhou	Team
Mediterranean Games
Silver medal – second place	2018 Tarragona	Team
Bronze medal – third place	2013 Mersin	Team
- Updated on 2 August 2018

Alexandros Evgenios Gounas (born 3 October 1989) is a Greek water polo player. He is member of the Greece men's national water polo team since 2008 and won a bronze medal at the 16th FINA World Championships and competed at the 2016 Summer Olympics. He plays for Greek powerhouse Olympiacos, with whom he won the 2017–18 LEN Champions League in Genoa. Moreover, in his collection are 6 Greek Championships and 6 Greek Cups in which he was voted Most Valuable Player four times, with them being the 2011–2012 NC Vouliagmeni, 2013–2014 Olympiacos, 2017–2018 Olympiacos, and 2018–2019 Olympiacos.

== Honours ==
=== Club ===
Vouliagmeni

- Greek Championship: 2011–12
- Greek Cup: 2011–12

Olympiacos

- LEN Champions League: 2017–18; runners-up: 2015–16, 2018–19
- Greek Championship: 2013–14, 2014–15, 2015–16
- Greek Cup: 2013–14, 2014–15, 2015–16, 2017–18, 2018–19, 2019–20
- Greek Super Cup: 2018, 2019

=== National team ===
- (silver) Silver Medal in 2018 Mediterranean Games Tarragona
- (bronze) Bronze Medal in 2013 Mediterranean Games, Mersin
- (bronze) Bronze Medal in 2015 World Championship Kazan
- (bronze) Bronze Medal in 2016 World League Huizhou
- 4th place in 2016 European Championship Belgrade
- 4th place in 2017 World Championship Budapest
- 6th place in 2016 Olympic Games, Rio

== Awards ==
- Greek Championship MVP: 2011–12 with Vouliagmeni, 2013–14, 2017–18, 2018–19, 2019–20 with Olympiacos
- Greek Championship Top Scorer: 2020–21, 2021–22 with Apollon Smyrnis

== See also ==
- List of World Aquatics Championships medalists in water polo
