= Georgios Ntoskas =

Greek water polo player

Giorgos Ntoskas
Personal information
- Nationality: Greece
- Born: 11 November 1984 (age 41) Chios, Greece

Sport
- Sport: Water polo

Senior clubs
- Years: Team
- 2001–2003 2003–2011 2011–2012 2012–2017: NC Chios; Olympiacos; NC Chios; Olympiacos
Medal record
Men's Water polo
Representing Greece
World Championships
Bronze medal – third place	2005 Montreal	Team competition
World League
Bronze medal – third place	2006 Athens	Team competition

Georgios Ntoskas (born 11 November 1984) is a retired Greek water polo player who competed in the 2008 Summer Olympics (7th place) with the Greece men's national water polo team. Ntoskas was part of the national squad that won the Bronze Medal in the 2005 World Championship in Montreal and the Bronze Medal in the 2006 World League in Athens.

Ntoskas started his career at his native NC Chios and in 2003 he moved to Olympiacos where he played for thirteen seasons (2003–2011, 2012–2017), winning 23 major titles (12 Greek Championships and 11 Greek Cups) and being runner-up of the 2015–16 LEN Champions League in Budapest.

== Honours ==
=== Club ===
Olympiacos

- LEN Champions League Runner-up: 2015–16
- Greek Championship (12): 2003–04, 2004–05, 2006–07, 2007–08, 2008–09, 2009–10, 2010–11, 2012–13, 2013–14, 2014–15, 2015–16, 2016–17
- Greek Cup (11): 2003–04, 2005–06, 2006–07, 2007–08, 2008–09, 2009–10, 2010–11, 2012–13, 2013–14, 2014–15, 2015–16

=== National team ===
- (bronze) Bronze Medal in 2005 World Championship, Montreal
- (bronze) Bronze Medal in 2006 World League, Athens

== See also ==
- List of World Aquatics Championships medalists in water polo
