= A2 Ethniki Water Polo =

- Sport: Water polo
- No. of teams: 14
- Country: Greece
- Continent: Europe
- Most recent champion: AEK (1st title)
- Most titles: Iraklis (4 titles)
- Promotion to: A1 Ethniki Water Polo
- Website: www.koe.org.gr

A2 Ethniki Water Polo is the 2nd-tier of the Greek Water Polo championship. It is held in three groups of teams and in current season, 14 teams take part. The championship is held in two stages. The two first teams of the 2nd stage promoted to A1 Ethniki. Current champions AEK won the 2019-20 A2 men's water polo season.

== Winners ==
=== Title holders ===
- 1986–87 Iraklis
- 1987–88 NOP
- 1988–89 NOX
- 1989–90 NOP
- 1990–91 OFTH
- 1991–92 NAO Kerkyras
- 1992–93 Aris
- 1993–94 OFTH
- 1994–95 Panionios
- 1995–96 Poseidon Ilision
- 1996–97 Ilysiakos
- 1997–98 Panathinaikos
- 1998–99 Aris
- 1999–00 PAOK
- 2000–01 Nhreas Chalandriou
- 2001–02 Panionios
- 2002–03 NO Chalkidas
- 2003–04 Glyfada
- 2004–05 Nhreas Chalandriou
- 2005–06 Iraklis
- 2006–07 NEP
- 2007–08 Iraklis
- 2008–09 Poseidon Ilision
- 2009–10 Ethnikos
- 2010–11 NOX
- 2011–12 Ilioupoli
- 2012–13 Glyfada
- 2013–14 NO Kalamakiou
- 2014–15 NEP
- 2015–16 NOP
- 2016–17 Apollon Smyrnis
- 2017–18 Peristeri
- 2018–19 Panathinaikos
- 2019–20 AEK

== Titles ==
=== Titles by club ===
Club	Winners	Winning years
Iraklis	3	1987, 2006, 2008
NOP	3	1988, 1990, 2016
Panathinaikos	2	1998, 2019
NEP	2	2007, 2015
Glyfada	2	2004, 2013
Poseidon Ilision	2	1996, 2009
Nireas Chalandriou	2	2001, 2005
Aris	2	1993, 1999
OFTH	2	1991, 1994
Panionios	2	1995, 2002
NOX	2	1989, 2011
AEK	1	2020

Notes

Classification of first 12 champion teams by the number of titles and year of achievement.

== Current teams ==
The clubs taking part in the 2015–16 league are:

1st Group	2nd Group	3rd Group
Panionios; Ionikos Nikaias; NO Rethymnou; NO Chanion; OFI	GS Peristeriou; GS Apollon Smyrnis; NO Larissas; NO Patras; NO Chalkis	Iraklis Water Polo; Ilisiakos; AS Apollo; NAO Kerkyras
