= Theodoros Chatzitheodorou =

Greek water polo player

Thodoris Chatzitheodorou
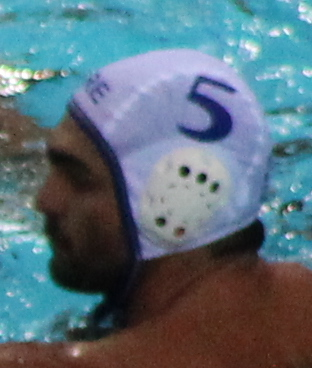
- Chatzitheodorou at the 2012 Summer Olympics

Personal information
- Nationality: Greece
- Born: 1 October 1976 (age 50) Athens, Greece

Sport
- Sport: Water polo
- Position: Head coach
- Current club: P.A.O.K. Water Polo Club

Senior clubs
- Years: Team
- –1995 1995–2010 2010–2011 2011–2012 2012–2013: Ilisiakos; Olympiacos; Partizan; Chios; Nireas Lamias
Medal record
Men's Water polo
Representing Greece
World Championships
Bronze medal – third place	2005 Montreal	Team competition
World League
Bronze medal – third place	2004 Long Beach	Team competition

Theodoros "Thodoris" Chatzitheodorou (Greek: Θεόδωρος Χατζηθεοδώρου [θeˈoðoɾos xadziθeoˈðoɾu], born 1 October 1976) is a retired Greek water polo player and current coach.

Chatzitheodorou started his career at Ilisiakos and then moved to Olympiacos where he played for fifteen consecutive seasons (1995–2010), winning 27 major titles (1 LEN Euroleague, 1 LEN Supercup, 12 Greek Championships, 11 Greek Cups and 2 Greek Supercups) and being voted Best European Player of the Year in 2001. He captained Olympiacos for several years and was a key player in Olympiacos' 2002 Quardruple (LEN Champions League, LEN Super Cup, Greek Championship, Greek Cup all in 2002).

In 2010–2011 season he played for VK Partizan, where he won the LEN Euroleague, the Serbian Championship, the Serbian Cup and the Eurointer Cup.

He has 156 appearances with Greece national water polo team, with whom he won the Bronze Medal in the 2005 World Championship in Montreal and the Bronze Medal in the 2004 World League in Long Beach. A four-time Olympian, Chatzitheodorou competed in the 1996 Summer Olympics (6th place), the 2000 Summer Olympics (10th place), the 2004 Summer Olympics (4th place) and the 2012 Summer Olympics (9th place) with the Greece men's national water polo team.

He is currently the record holder of titles (31) in the history of Greek team sports.

== Club career ==
- 1993–1995 (Greece) Ilisiakos
- 1995–2010 (Greece) Olympiacos
- 2010–2011 (Serbia) Partizan
- 2011–2012 (Greece) Chios
- 2012–2013 (Greece) Nireas Lamias

== Honours ==
=== Club ===
Olympiacos

- LEN Euroleague (1): 2001–02
- LEN Super Cup (1): 2002
- Greek Championship (12): 1996, 1999, 2000, 2001, 2002, 2003, 2004, 2005, 2007, 2008, 2009, 2010
- Greek Cup (11): 1997, 1998, 2001, 2002, 2003, 2004, 2006, 2007, 2008, 2009, 2010
- Greek Super Cup (2): 1997, 1998

Partizan

- LEN Euroleague (1) : 2010–11
- Serbian Championship (1): 2010–11
- Serbian Cup (1): 2010–11
- Eurointer League (1): 2010–11

=== National team ===
- (bronze) Bronze Medal in 2005 World Championship, Montreal
- (bronze) Bronze Medal in 2004 World League, Long Beach
- 4th place in 2004 Olympic Games, Athens
- 6th place in 1996 Olympic Games, Atlanta
- 4th place in 2003 World Championship, Barcelona

=== Individual ===
- Best European Player in 2001

== See also ==
- Greece men's Olympic water polo team records and statistics
- List of players who have appeared in multiple men's Olympic water polo tournaments
- List of World Aquatics Championships medalists in water polo
