= Stylianos Argyropoulos =

Greek water polo player (born 1996)

Stelios Argyropoulos
Personal information
- Full name: Stylianos Argyropoulos Kanakakis
- Nationality: Greek
- Born: 2 August 1996 (age 30) Athens, Greece
- Height: 190 cm (75 in)
- Weight: 105 kg (231 lb)

Sport
- Sport: Water polo
- Position: Drive
- Current club: Ferencváros

Senior clubs
- Years: Team
- 2014–2017: Ethnikos Piraeus
- 2017–2021: Olympiacos
- 2021–2022: Jug
- 2022–present: Ferencváros
Medal record
Representing Greece
Olympic Games
Silver medal – second place	2020 Tokyo	Team
World Championships
Silver medal – second place	2023 Fukuoka	Team
Bronze medal – third place	2022 Budapest	Team
Bronze medal – third place	2025 Singapore	Team
European Championship
Bronze medal – third place	2026 Belgrade
World Cup
Gold medal – first place	2026 Sydney
FINA World League
Bronze medal – third place	2020 Tbilisi
Mediterranean Games
Silver medal – second place	2018 Tarragona	Team

Stylianos "Stelios" Argyropoulos Kanakakis (born 2 August 1996) is a Greek water polo player, who is a member of Greece men's national water polo team. He is regarded as one of the greatest water polo players of his generation.

== Career ==
He started his career in Ethnikos. He was named best rookie of the Greek championship in 2015 and 2016. He then played for Greek powerhouse Olympiacos, with whom he won the 2017–18 LEN Champions League, two Greek Championships and one Greek Cup.

He was part of Greece national team that competed at the 2017 World Aquatics Championships in Budapest.

On 25 January 2026, he was selected in the all-star team of the 2026 Men's European Water Polo Championship held in Belgrade.

Since 2025, he has played with Ferencvárosi TC (FTC-Telekom Waterpolo) in Hungary.

In April 2026, Argyropoulos was the top scorer at the 2026 FINA Men's Water Polo World Cup held in Greece, with 24 goals. In July 2027 at Sydney, Australia, at the Super Final of the same tournament, he was selected in the best "All Star Team" of the 2026 Water Polo World Cup.

== Honours ==
=== Club ===
Olympiacos

- LEN Champions League: 2017–18; runners-up: 2018–19
- Greek Championship: 2017–18, 2018–19, 2019–20, 2020–21
- Greek Cup: 2017–18, 2018–19, 2019–20, 2020–21
- Greek Super Cup : 2018, 2019, 2020

Jug Dubrovnik

- Croatian Championship: 2021–22

Ferencváros

- Hungarian Championship: 2022–23, 2023–24
- Hungarian Cup: 2022–23, 2023–24
- LEN Champions League: 2023–24
- LEN Super Cup: 2024

== Awards ==
- Greek Championship Rookie of the Year 2014–15, 2015–16 with Ethnikos Piraeus
- Summer Olympics 2020 Tokyo Team of the Tournament
- Member of the World Team by totalwaterpolo: 2021
