= Angelos Vlachopoulos =

Greek water polo player

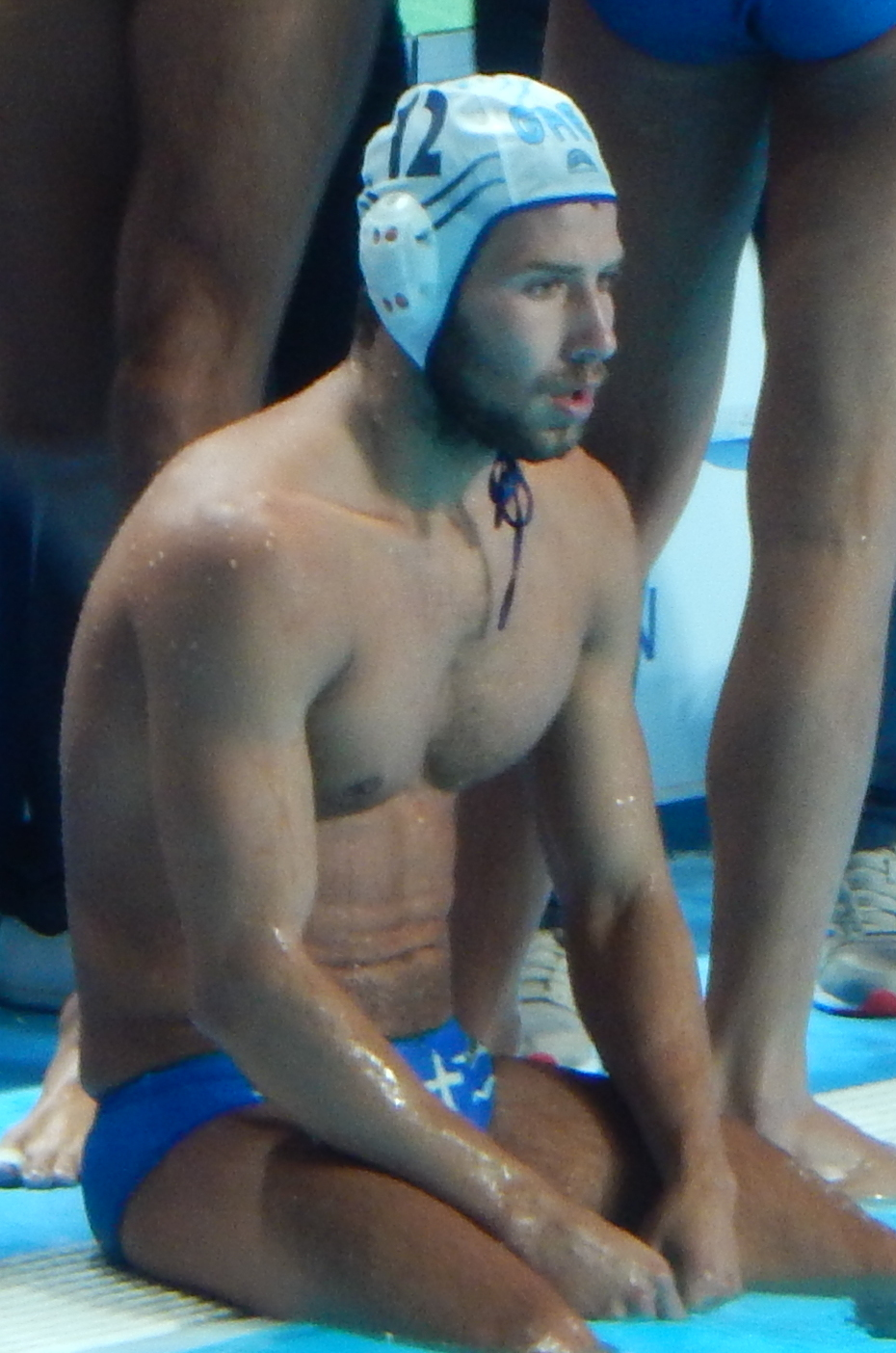
- Vlachopoulos at the 2015 World Championships

Personal information
- Nationality: Greek
- Born: 28 September 1991 (age 35) Thessaloniki, Greece
- Height: 179 cm (5 ft 10 in)
- Weight: 75 kg (165 lb)

Sport
- Sport: Water polo
- Handedness: Right
- Position: Drive/Wing
- Current club: Radnicki

Senior clubs
- Years: Team
- 2009–2013: Vouliagmeni
- 2013–2016: Olympiacos
- 2016–2017: CN Posillipo
- 2017–2020: Egri VK
- 2020–2021: AN Brescia
- 2021–2025: VK Novi Beograd
- 2025-present: Radnicki
Medal record
Representing Greece
Olympic Games
Silver medal – second place	2020 Tokyo	Team
World Championships
Bronze medal – third place	2015 Kazan	Team
Bronze medal – third place	2022 Budapest	Team
FINA World League
Bronze medal – third place	2016 Huizhou	Team
Mediterranean Games
Silver medal – second place	2018 Tarragona	Team
Bronze medal – third place	2013 Mersin	Team
Youth World Championship
Silver medal – second place	2009 Šibenik	Team
Bronze medal – third place	2011 Volos	Team
Youth European Championship
Silver medal – second place	2010 Stuttgart	Team
- Updated on 2 August 2018

Angelos Vlachopoulos (Greek: Άγγελος Βλαχόπουλος; born 28 September 1991) is a Greek water polo player. He won a bronze medal at the 2015 World Championships and competed at the 2016 Summer Olympics. He plays for Serbian club VK Novi Beograd.

== Honours ==
Vouliagmeni

- Greek Championship: 2011–12
- Greek Cup: 2011–12

Olympiacos

- Greek Championship: 2013–14, 2014–15, 2015–16
- Greek Cup: 2013–14, 2014–15, 2015–16
- LEN Champions League runners-up: 2015–16

AN Brescia

- Serie A1: 2020–21

VK Novi Beograd

- LEN Champions League runners-up: 2021–22, 2022–23
- Adriatic League: 2021–22, 2023–24
- Serbian Championship: 2021–22, 2022–23
- Serbian Cup: 2023–24

== Awards ==
- Member of the World Team by total-waterpolo: 2021
- LEN Champions League Top Scorer: 2020–21
- LEN Champions League Left Driver of the Year: 2020–21
- Greek Water Polo Player of the Year: 2022
- Greek Championship MVP: 2015–16
- Greek Championship Right Winger of the Year: 2011–12, 2012–2013, 2013–2014, 2014–2015, 2015–2016
- Adriatic League Right Winger of the Year: 2023–24

== See also ==
- List of World Aquatics Championships medalists in water polo
