= Ioannis Fountoulis =

Greek water polo player

Giannis Fountoulis
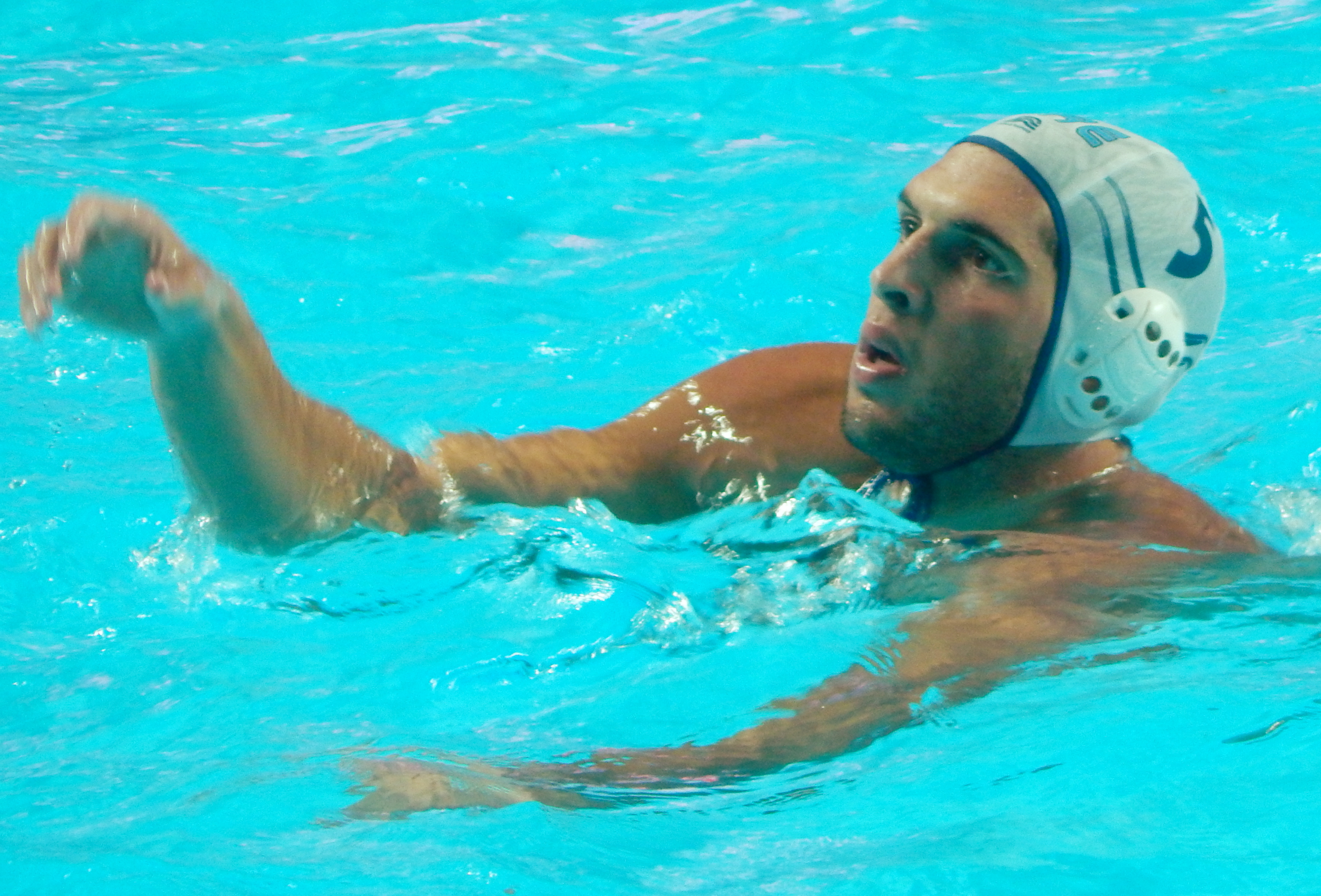
- Fountoulis at the 2015 World Championships

Personal information
- Born: 25 May 1988 (age 38) Chios, Greece
- Height: 186 cm (6 ft 1 in)
- Weight: 90 kg (198 lb)

Sport
- Sport: Water polo
- Handedness: Right
- Position: Wing / Driver
- Current club: Olympiacos

Senior clubs
- Years: Team
- 2005–2009 2009–2019 2019–2021 2021–: Chios; Olympiacos; Ferencváros; Olympiacos
National team
- Years: Team
- 2006–: Greece
Medal record
Representing Greece
Olympic Games
Silver medal – second place	2020 Tokyo	Team
World Championships
Silver medal – second place	2023 Fukuoka	Team
Bronze medal – third place	2015 Kazan	Team
Bronze medal – third place	2022 Budapest	Team
FINA World League
Bronze medal – third place	2006 Athens
Bronze medal – third place	2016 Huizhou
Bronze medal – third place	2020 Tbilisi
Mediterranean Games
Silver medal – second place	2018 Tarragona
Bronze medal – third place	2013 Mersin

Ioannis Fountoulis (also Giannis, Greek: Γιάννης Φουντούλης; born 25 May 1988) is a Greek professional water polo player. He is the former captain of Greece men's national water polo team, with whom he won a bronze medal at the 2015 World Championships, a bronze medal at the 2016 World League, 2020 World League and competed at the 2012 and 2016 Olympics, and 2024 Summer Olympics, being the top scorer of the Greece National Team of all time.

He played for the Greek Olympiacos since 2009, and in 2018 he won the 2017–18 LEN Champions League with the Greek giants, scoring 4 goals in the final game against Pro Recco in Genoa. He is a big scorer and leader. Currently playing for the Greek club Olympiacos.

Fountoulis was the top scorer of the 2017 World Championship with 23 goals and the top scorer of the 2018 European Championship with 17 goals (along with Aleksandar Ivović). He was voted in the All-Tournament Team of the 2015 World Championship as well as the All-Tournament Team of the 2017 World Championship. Fountoulis has been the top scorer of Greek Water Polo League six times (2012–2017, consecutive) playing for Olympiacos. He has been voted MVP of the Greek Water Polo League τhree times in 2012–13, 2014–15 and 2016–17 seasons and three times Greek Cup MVP in 2011, 2013 and 2018.

As of June 2018, Fountoulis has scored 148 goals in LEN Champions League, the most by any Greek player in the history of the top-tier European competition.

Fountoulis was given the honour to carry the national flag of Greece at the closing ceremony of the 2020 Summer Olympics in Tokyo, becoming the 28th water polo player to be a flag bearer at the opening and closing ceremonies of the Olympics.

== Honours ==
=== Club ===
Olympiacos

- LEN Champions League: 2017–18; runners-up: 2015–16, 2018–19
- Greek Championship: 2009–10, 2010–11, 2012–13, 2013–14, 2014–15, 2015–16, 2016–17, 2017–18, 2018–19, 2021–22, 2022–23, 2023–24, 2024-25, 2025–26
- Greek Cup: 2009–10, 2010–11, 2012–13, 2013–14, 2014–15, 2015–16, 2017–18, 2018–19, 2021–22, 2022–23, 2023–24, 2024–25, 2025–26
- Greek Super Cup: 2018

Ferencváros

- LEN Champions League runners-up: 2020–21
- LEN Super Cup: 2019
- Hungarian Cup: 2019–20, 2020–21

=== National team ===
- (silver) Silver Medal in 2020 Olympic Games, Tokyo
- (silver) Silver Medal in 2018 Mediterranean Games Tarragona
- (bronze) Bronze Medal in 2013 Mediterranean Games, Mersin
- (bronze) Bronze Medal in 2015 World Championship Kazan
- (bronze) Bronze Medal in 2006 World League Athens
- (bronze) Bronze Medal in 2016 World League Huizhou
- (bronze) Bronze Medal in 2020 World League Tbilisi
- 4th place in 2016 European Championship Belgrade
- 4th place in 2017 World Championship Budapest
- 5th place in 2024 Olympic Games, Paris
- 6th place in 2016 Olympic Games, Rio

== Awards ==
- LEN Champions League Lefr Winger of the Year: 2015–16
- LEN Champions League Left Driver of the Year: 2017–18
- Top Scorer of the 2017 World Championship: 23 goals
- Top Scorer of the 2018 European Championship: 17 goals
- 2015 World Championship Team of the Tournament
- 2017 World Championship Team of the Tournament
- Greek Championship Top scorer: 2011–12, 2012–13, 2013–14, 2014–15, 2015–16, 2016–17 with Olympiacos
- All-time Greek Top Scorer in the LEN Champions League: 148 goals with Olympiacos
- Greek Championship MVP: 2012–13, 2014–15, 2016–17 with Olympiacos
- Greek Cup MVP: 2011, 2013, 2018 with Olympiacos
- Greek Water Polo Player of the Year: 2021
- Second Top European Player in the World by LEN: 2016
- Third Top European Player in the World by LEN: 2018, 2021
- Member of the World Team 2018 by total-waterpolo

== See also ==
- Greece men's Olympic water polo team records and statistics
- List of flag bearers for Greece at the Olympics
- List of World Aquatics Championships medalists in water polo
