= Konstantinos Genidounias =

Greek water polo player

Konstantinos "Psaraki" Genidounias
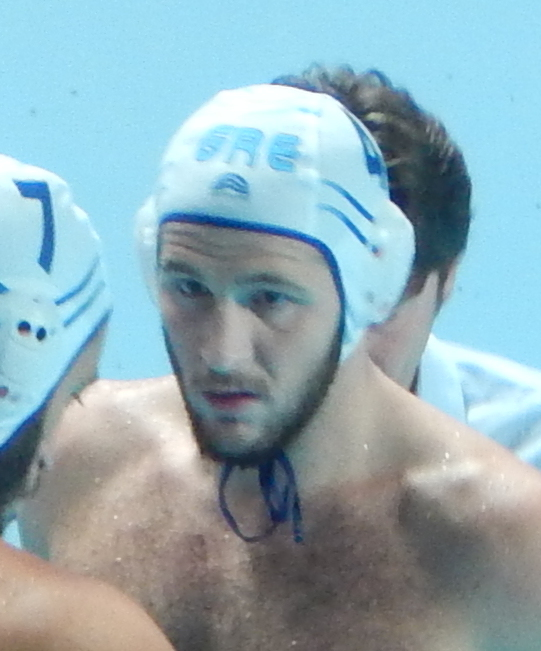
- Genidounias in 2015

Personal information
- Nationality: Greek
- Born: 3 May 1993 (age 33) Athens, Greece
- Height: 183 cm (72 in)
- Weight: 87 kg (192 lb)

Sport
- Sport: Water polo
- Handedness: Right
- Position: Driver
- Current club: Olympiacos
- Number: 4

Senior clubs
- Years: Team
- 2010–2011: Palaio Faliro
- 2011–2015: USC
- 2015–present: Olympiacos
Medal record
Men's water polo
Representing Greece
Olympic Games
| Silver medal – second place | 2020 Tokyo | Team |
World Championships
| Silver medal – second place | 2023 Fukuoka | Team |
| Bronze medal – third place | 2015 Kazan | Team |
| Bronze medal – third place | 2022 Budapest | Team |
| Bronze medal – third place | 2025 Singapore | Team |
European Championship
| Bronze medal – third place | 2026 Belgrade |
FINA World League
| Bronze medal – third place | 2016 Huizhou |
| Bronze medal – third place | 2020 Tbilisi |
Mediterranean Games
| Silver medal – second place | 2018 Tarragona |
| Bronze medal – third place | 2013 Mersin |
Youth World Championship
| Silver medal – second place | 2009 Šibenik |
| Bronze medal – third place | 2011 Volos |
Youth European Championship
| Silver medal – second place | 2010 Stuttgart |

Konstantinos Genidounias (born 3 May 1993) is a Greek water polo player. He was part of the Greek team that won the bronze medal at the 2015 World Aquatics Championships. Genidounias is considered one of the top scorers in the world. His top personal distinction is when he became the top scorer of the Champions League 2018–19 season as he scored 42 goals while in the same year he emerged ninth top player in the world.

== Career ==
He was a member of the team that competed for Greece at the 2016 Summer Olympics. They finished in 6th place.

Graduated with a degree of communications from the University of Southern California where he attended from 2011 to 2014 and was a member of the Men's Water Polo Team winning three consecutive NCAA championships with the USC Trojans under head coach Jovan Vavic.

He plays for Greek powerhouse Olympiacos, with whom he won the 2017–18 LEN Champions League.

== Honours ==
=== National team ===
- (silver) Silver Medal in 2020 Olympic Games, Tokyo
- (silver) Silver Medal in 2023 World Championship, Fukuoka
- (silver) Silver Medal in 2018 Mediterranean Games, Tarragona
- (bronze) Bronze Medal in 2013 Mediterranean Games, Mersin
- (bronze) Bronze Medal in 2015 World Championship, Kazan
- (bronze) Bronze Medal in 2022 World Championship, Budapest
- (bronze) Bronze Medal in 2016 World League, Huizhou
- (bronze) Bronze Medal in 2020 World League, Tbilisi
- 4th place in 2016 European Championship, Belgrade
- 4th place in 2017 World Championship, Budapest
- 5th place in 2024 Olympic Games, Paris
- 6th place in 2016 Olympic Games, Rio

=== Club ===
Olympiacos

- LEN Champions League: 2017–18; runners-up: 2015–16, 2018–19
- Greek Championship: 2015–16, 2016–17, 2017–18, 2018–19, 2019–20, 2020–21, 2021–22, 2022–23, 2023–24, 2024–25
- Greek Cup: 2015–16, 2017–18, 2018–19, 2019–20, 2020–21, 2021–22, 2022–23, 2023–24, 2024–25, 2025–26
- Greek Super Cup: 2018, 2019, 2020

Trojans

- NCCA Championship: 2012, 2013, 2014

== Awards ==
- Youth European Championship MVP: 2010 Stuttgart
- Peter J. Cutino Award: 2015
- LEN Champions League Top Scorer: 2018–19
- LEN Champions League Left Driver of the Year: 2018–19
- LEN Champions League Right Driver of the Year: 2023–24
- Greek Championship MVP: 2020–21
- Greek Championship Left Driver of the Year: 2015–16, 2016–17, 2017–18, 2018–19, 2019–20, 2020–21, 2021–22, 2022–23

== See also ==
- Greece men's Olympic water polo team records and statistics
- List of World Aquatics Championships medalists in water polo
