= G.S. Nireas Lamias =

Aquatic sports club of Lamia, Greece

- Founded: 1998
- League: (Greece) A1 Ethniki
- Based in: Lamia (city)
- Colors
- President: Christos Betchavas
- Head coach: Theodoros Chatzitheodorou
- Website: http://www.nireaslamias.gr/

Nireas Lamias is an aquatic sports club, founded in 1998, in Lamia, Greece. As of the 2013-2014 season, the club participates in the A1 Division replacing NO Chania, which withdrew from the championship. In the 2014-15 season Nireas Lamias was relegated to A2 Ethniki.

== Recent seasons ==
Season	Division	Place	Notes
2012-13	A2 Ethniki	3rd	Promoted to A1 Ethniki
2013-14	A1 Ethniki	5th	
2014-15	A1 Ethniki	12th	Relegated to A2
