= Thriamvos Patras =

Thriamvos Patras (Greek: ΑΟ Θρίαμβος Πατρών) was founded in 1991 and had athletic clubs including water polo, swimming, synchronized diving, basketball, chess and ping pong.

In 2001, its dodgeball club united with Foinikas Patras and changed its name to AS Ormi Patras, the polo and swimming dissolved in 2006 and OPATHA and it became NE Patras.

== Achievements ==
=== Badminton ===
- Second Division Championships: 1

2005

=== Water Polo ===
- Male:
  - Second Division Championships: 3

1989, 1992

  - Third Division Championships: 2

1983, 1985
