= 2020 FINA Men's Water Polo World League =

- League: FINA Water Polo World League
- Sport: Water Polo
- Duration: 12 November 2019 to 1 July 2021

Super Final
- Finals champions: Montenegro (3rd title)
- Runners-up: United States
- Finals MVP: (Montenegro) Aleksandar Ivović

FINA Men's Water Polo World League seasons
- ← 2019 2022 →

The 2020 FINA Men's Water Polo World League was the 19th edition of the annual men's international water polo tournament. It was played between November 2019 and July 2021 and open to all men's water polo national teams. After participating in a preliminary round, eight teams qualified to play in a final tournament, called the Super Final, originally scheduled from 23 to 28 June 2020. The tournament was postponed due to the COVID-19 pandemic. In August 2020, it was announced that it would be played in from January to July 2021.

Montenegro won their third overall title, after defeating the United States in the final.

In the world league, there are specific rules that do not allow matches to end in a draw. If teams are level at the end of the 4th quarter of any world league match, the match will be decided by a penalty shootout. The following points will be awarded per match to each team:

- Match won – 3 points
- Match won by penalty – 2 points
- Match lost by penalty – 1 point
- Match lost or forfeited – 0 points

== European qualification ==
=== Preliminary round ===
- 12 November 2019 – 11 February 2020

The preliminary round was played in the Round-robin system.

==== Group A ====
Pos	Team	Pld	W	OTW	OTL	L	GF	GA	GD	Pts	Qualification	Italy	Greece	Georgia
1	Italy	2	2	0	0	0	23	9	+14	6	Final round	—	—	14–3
2	Greece	2	1	0	0	1	25	16	+9	3	Final round	6–9	—	—
3	Georgia	2	0	0	0	2	10	33	−23	0		—	7–19	—

Source: FINA

==== Group B ====
Pos	Team	Pld	W	OTW	OTL	L	GF	GA	GD	Pts	Qualification	France	Hungary	Russia
1	France	2	1	0	1	0	27	23	+4	4	Final round	—	15–10	—
2	Hungary	2	1	0	0	1	24	21	+3	3	Final round	—	—	14–6
3	Russia	2	0	1	0	1	19	26	−7	2		13–12 (p)	—	—

Source: FINA

==== Group C ====
Pos	Team	Pld	W	OTW	OTL	L	GF	GA	GD	Pts	Qualification	Serbia	Croatia	Netherlands
1	Serbia	2	2	0	0	0	27	18	+9	6	Final round	—	15–11	—
2	Croatia	2	1	0	0	1	27	22	+5	3	Final round	—	—	16–7
3	Netherlands	2	0	0	0	2	14	28	−14	0		7–12	—	—

Source: FINA

==== Group D ====
Pos	Team	Pld	W	OTW	OTL	L	GF	GA	GD	Pts	Qualification	Montenegro	Spain	Ukraine
1	Montenegro	2	2	0	0	0	34	9	+25	6	Final round	—	—	23–3
2	Spain	2	1	0	0	1	26	19	+7	3	Final round	6–11	—	20–8
3	Ukraine	2	0	0	0	2	11	43	−32	0		—	—	—

Source: FINA

=== Final round ===
- 8–10 January 2021, Debrecen, Hungary

==== Bracket ====
Quarterfinals
8 January 2021
Montenegro (PSO)	15
Croatia	14
8 January 2021
Italy	9
Hungary	8
10 March 2020
Serbia	11
Spain	13
8 January 2021
France	3
Greece	12

Semifinals
9 January 2021
Montenegro	14
Italy	10
9 January 2021
Spain	11
Greece	12

Final
10 January 2021
Montenegro	7
Greece	12
Third place game
10 January 2021
Italy	9
Spain	8

5th–8th place bracket

5th–8th place semifinals
9 January 2021
Croatia	11
Hungary	13
9 January 2021
Serbia	10
France	6

Fifth place game
10 January 2021
Hungary	7
Serbia	9
Seventh place game
10 January 2021
Croatia	17
France	5

==== Final ranking ====
Qualified to the Super Final

Rank	Team
Gold medal	Greece
Silver medal	Montenegro
Bronze medal	Italy
4	Spain
5	Serbia
6	Hungary
7	Croatia
8	France

== Inter-Continental Cup ==
- 24 – 31 May 2021, Indianapolis, United States — cancelled

== Super final ==
Super final
Tournament details
- Host country: Georgia
- Venue: 1 (in 1 host city)
- Dates: 26 June – 1 July 2021
- Teams: 8 (from 3 confederations)

Tournament statistics
- Matches played: 24
- Goals scored: 534 (22.25 per match)
- Top scorers: (Japan) Yusuke Inaba (21 goals)

As host country

- Georgia

Qualified teams

- Greece
- Italy
- Montenegro

Invited teams

- France
- Japan
- Kazakhstan
- United States

=== Preliminary round ===
All times are local (UTC+4).

==== Group A ====
Pos	Team	Pld	W	OTW	OTL	L	GF	GA	GD	Pts
1	Italy	3	3	0	0	0	42	26	+16	9
2	Greece	3	2	0	0	1	32	28	+4	6
3	France	3	1	0	0	2	27	35	−8	3
4	Kazakhstan	3	0	0	0	3	31	43	−12	0

Source: Microplustiming
Rules for classification: 1) points; 2) head-to-head points; 3) head-to-head goal difference; 4) head-to-head number of goals scored; 5) goal difference.

26 June 2021; 18:15	Report	Greece	10–8	France	Tbilisi Olympic Pool, Tbilisi; Referees: Frank Ohme (GER), Vakhtang Mebuke (GEO)
26 June 2021; 18:15	Report	Score by quarters: 2–2, 3–1, 2–3, 3–2			Tbilisi Olympic Pool, Tbilisi; Referees: Frank Ohme (GER), Vakhtang Mebuke (GEO)
26 June 2021; 18:15	Report	Argyropoulos, Genidounias 3	Goals	Bouët, Canonne 2	Tbilisi Olympic Pool, Tbilisi; Referees: Frank Ohme (GER), Vakhtang Mebuke (GEO)

26 June 2021; 20:00	Report	Kazakhstan	11–17	Italy	Tbilisi Olympic Pool, Tbilisi; Referees: Stanko Ivanovski (MNE), Michael Goldenberg (USA)
26 June 2021; 20:00	Report	Score by quarters: 1–3, 3–3, 3–6, 4–3			Tbilisi Olympic Pool, Tbilisi; Referees: Stanko Ivanovski (MNE), Michael Goldenberg (USA)
26 June 2021; 20:00	Report	Vuksanovich 4	Goals	Damonte, Fondelli 3	Tbilisi Olympic Pool, Tbilisi; Referees: Stanko Ivanovski (MNE), Michael Goldenberg (USA)

27 June 2021; 14:45	Report	Kazakhstan	11–12	France	Tbilisi Olympic Pool, Tbilisi; Referees: Dion Willis (RSA), Michael Goldenberg (USA)
27 June 2021; 14:45	Report	Score by quarters: 2–2, 2–3, 3–6, 4–1			Tbilisi Olympic Pool, Tbilisi; Referees: Dion Willis (RSA), Michael Goldenberg (USA)
27 June 2021; 14:45	Report	three players 3	Goals	Vernoux 4	Tbilisi Olympic Pool, Tbilisi; Referees: Dion Willis (RSA), Michael Goldenberg (USA)

27 June 2021; 18:15	Report	Italy	11–8	Greece	Tbilisi Olympic Pool, Tbilisi; Referees: Frank Ohme (GER), Stanko Ivanovski (MNE)
27 June 2021; 18:15	Report	Score by quarters: 1–1, 4–3, 4–3, 2–1			Tbilisi Olympic Pool, Tbilisi; Referees: Frank Ohme (GER), Stanko Ivanovski (MNE)
27 June 2021; 18:15	Report	Di Fulvio 4	Goals	three players 2	Tbilisi Olympic Pool, Tbilisi; Referees: Frank Ohme (GER), Stanko Ivanovski (MNE)

28 June 2021; 14:45	Report	Greece	14–9	Kazakhstan	Tbilisi Olympic Pool, Tbilisi; Referees: Dion Willis (RSA), Nenad Periš (CRO)
28 June 2021; 14:45	Report	Score by quarters: 3–1, 5–3, 3–4, 3–1			Tbilisi Olympic Pool, Tbilisi; Referees: Dion Willis (RSA), Nenad Periš (CRO)
28 June 2021; 14:45	Report	Dervisis, Fountoulis 3	Goals	Vuksanovic 4	Tbilisi Olympic Pool, Tbilisi; Referees: Dion Willis (RSA), Nenad Periš (CRO)

28 June 2021; 20:00	Report	France	7–14	Italy	Tbilisi Olympic Pool, Tbilisi; Referees: Vakhtang Mebuke (GEO), Michael Goldenberg (USA)
28 June 2021; 20:00	Report	Score by quarters: 1–4, 4–4, 0–3, 2–3			Tbilisi Olympic Pool, Tbilisi; Referees: Vakhtang Mebuke (GEO), Michael Goldenberg (USA)
28 June 2021; 20:00	Report	Bouët 3	Goals	Velotto 3	Tbilisi Olympic Pool, Tbilisi; Referees: Vakhtang Mebuke (GEO), Michael Goldenberg (USA)

==== Group B ====
Pos	Team	Pld	W	OTW	OTL	L	GF	GA	GD	Pts
1	Montenegro	3	3	0	0	0	45	22	+23	9
2	United States	3	2	0	0	1	34	26	+8	6
3	Georgia (H)	3	1	0	0	2	30	44	−14	3
4	Japan	3	0	0	0	3	27	44	−17	0

Source: Microplustiming
Rules for classification: 1) points; 2) head-to-head points; 3) head-to-head goal difference; 4) head-to-head number of goals scored; 5) goal difference.
(H) Host

26 June 2021; 14:45	Report	Montenegro	10–6	United States	Tbilisi Olympic Pool, Tbilisi; Referees: Sébastien Dervieux (FRA), Adil Aimbetov (KAZ)
26 June 2021; 14:45	Report	Score by quarters: 0–2, 5–2, 3–2, 2–0			Tbilisi Olympic Pool, Tbilisi; Referees: Sébastien Dervieux (FRA), Adil Aimbetov (KAZ)
26 June 2021; 14:45	Report	Ivović 3	Goals	Hooper 2	Tbilisi Olympic Pool, Tbilisi; Referees: Sébastien Dervieux (FRA), Adil Aimbetov (KAZ)

26 June 2021; 16:30	Report	Japan	12–13	Georgia	Tbilisi Olympic Pool, Tbilisi; Referees: Nenad Periš (CRO), Vojin Putniković (SRB)
26 June 2021; 16:30	Report	Score by quarters: 3–3, 2–4, 6–5, 1–1			Tbilisi Olympic Pool, Tbilisi; Referees: Nenad Periš (CRO), Vojin Putniković (SRB)
26 June 2021; 16:30	Report	Inaba 5	Goals	Baraldi 5	Tbilisi Olympic Pool, Tbilisi; Referees: Nenad Periš (CRO), Vojin Putniković (SRB)

27 June 2021; 16:30	Report	Georgia	8–19	Montenegro	Tbilisi Olympic Pool, Tbilisi; Referees: Nenad Periš (CRO), Christos Kourtidis (GRE)
27 June 2021; 16:30	Report	Score by quarters: 2–8, 4–6, 1–3, 1–2			Tbilisi Olympic Pool, Tbilisi; Referees: Nenad Periš (CRO), Christos Kourtidis (GRE)
27 June 2021; 16:30	Report	Shushiashvili 3	Goals	Ivović, Matković 4	Tbilisi Olympic Pool, Tbilisi; Referees: Nenad Periš (CRO), Christos Kourtidis (GRE)

27 June 2021; 20:00	Report	Japan	7–15	United States	Tbilisi Olympic Pool, Tbilisi; Referees: Sébastien Dervieux (FRA), Alessandro Severo (ITA)
27 June 2021; 20:00	Report	Score by quarters: 2–3, 2–4, 2–3, 1–5			Tbilisi Olympic Pool, Tbilisi; Referees: Sébastien Dervieux (FRA), Alessandro Severo (ITA)
27 June 2021; 20:00	Report	Inaba 3	Goals	Hallock 4	Tbilisi Olympic Pool, Tbilisi; Referees: Sébastien Dervieux (FRA), Alessandro Severo (ITA)

28 June 2021; 16:30	Report	United States	13–9	Georgia	Tbilisi Olympic Pool, Tbilisi; Referees: Alessandro Severo (ITA), Vojin Putniković (SRB)
28 June 2021; 16:30	Report	Score by quarters: 3–1, 5–2, 2–3, 3–3			Tbilisi Olympic Pool, Tbilisi; Referees: Alessandro Severo (ITA), Vojin Putniković (SRB)
28 June 2021; 16:30	Report	Daube, Irving 3	Goals	Jelača 3	Tbilisi Olympic Pool, Tbilisi; Referees: Alessandro Severo (ITA), Vojin Putniković (SRB)

28 June 2021; 18:15	Report	Montenegro	16–8	Japan	Tbilisi Olympic Pool, Tbilisi; Referees: Germán Moller (ARG), Frank Ohme (GER)
28 June 2021; 18:15	Report	Score by quarters: 4–5, 4–1, 5–1, 3–1			Tbilisi Olympic Pool, Tbilisi; Referees: Germán Moller (ARG), Frank Ohme (GER)
28 June 2021; 18:15	Report	Vidović 4	Goals	Inaba 4	Tbilisi Olympic Pool, Tbilisi; Referees: Germán Moller (ARG), Frank Ohme (GER)

=== Knockout stage ===
==== Bracket ====
Quarterfinals
29 June
Greece	20
Georgia	8
29 June
Kazakhstan	6
Montenegro	18
29 June
France	11
United States	12
29 June
Italy	15
Japan	12

Semifinals
30 June
Greece	4
Montenegro	8
30 June
United States	10
Italy	8

Final
1 July
Montenegro	9
United States	8
Third place game
1 July
Greece	10
Italy	8

5th–8th place bracket

5th–8th place semifinals
30 June
Georgia	15
Kazakhstan (PSO)	16
30 June
France	10
Japan	16

Fifth place game
1 July
Kazakhstan	10
Japan	17
Seventh place game
1 July
Georgia	5
France	10

==== Quarterfinals ====
29 June 2021; 14:45	Report	France	11–12	United States	Tbilisi Olympic Pool, Tbilisi; Referees: Stanko Ivanovski (MNE), Adil Aimbetov (KAZ)
29 June 2021; 14:45	Report	Score by quarters: 5–2, 0–5, 4–4, 2–1			Tbilisi Olympic Pool, Tbilisi; Referees: Stanko Ivanovski (MNE), Adil Aimbetov (KAZ)
29 June 2021; 14:45	Report	Crousillat 4	Goals	Daube 3	Tbilisi Olympic Pool, Tbilisi; Referees: Stanko Ivanovski (MNE), Adil Aimbetov (KAZ)

29 June 2021; 16:30	Report	Greece	20–8	Georgia	Tbilisi Olympic Pool, Tbilisi; Referees: Dion Willis (RSA), Sébastien Dervieux (FRA)
29 June 2021; 16:30	Report	Score by quarters: 5–1, 5–2, 6–1, 4–4			Tbilisi Olympic Pool, Tbilisi; Referees: Dion Willis (RSA), Sébastien Dervieux (FRA)
29 June 2021; 16:30	Report	Fountoulis 6	Goals	three players 2	Tbilisi Olympic Pool, Tbilisi; Referees: Dion Willis (RSA), Sébastien Dervieux (FRA)

29 June 2021; 18:15	Report	Italy	15–12	Japan	Tbilisi Olympic Pool, Tbilisi; Referees: Vakhtang Mebuke (GEO), Christos Kourtidis (GRE)
29 June 2021; 18:15	Report	Score by quarters: 4–1, 5–4, 3–2, 3–5			Tbilisi Olympic Pool, Tbilisi; Referees: Vakhtang Mebuke (GEO), Christos Kourtidis (GRE)
29 June 2021; 18:15	Report	Alesiani, Echenique 3	Goals	four players 2	Tbilisi Olympic Pool, Tbilisi; Referees: Vakhtang Mebuke (GEO), Christos Kourtidis (GRE)

29 June 2021; 20:00	Report	Kazakhstan	6–18	Montenegro	Tbilisi Olympic Pool, Tbilisi; Referees: Germán Moller (ARG), Vojin Putniković (SRB)
29 June 2021; 20:00	Report	Score by quarters: 2–6, 0–6, 3–3, 1–3			Tbilisi Olympic Pool, Tbilisi; Referees: Germán Moller (ARG), Vojin Putniković (SRB)
29 June 2021; 20:00	Report	six players 1	Goals	Ivović 4	Tbilisi Olympic Pool, Tbilisi; Referees: Germán Moller (ARG), Vojin Putniković (SRB)

==== 5–8th place semifinals ====
30 June 2021; 14:45	Report	France	10–16	Japan	Tbilisi Olympic Pool, Tbilisi; Referees: Germán Moller (ARG), Alessandro Severo (ITA)
30 June 2021; 14:45	Report	Score by quarters: 4–3, 1–4, 5–2, 0–7			Tbilisi Olympic Pool, Tbilisi; Referees: Germán Moller (ARG), Alessandro Severo (ITA)
30 June 2021; 14:45	Report	Crousillat, Vernoux 4	Goals	Inaba 5	Tbilisi Olympic Pool, Tbilisi; Referees: Germán Moller (ARG), Alessandro Severo (ITA)

30 June 2021; 16:30	Report	Georgia	15–16 (PSO)	Kazakhstan	Tbilisi Olympic Pool, Tbilisi; Referees: Michael Goldenberg (USA), Christos Kourtidis (GRE)
30 June 2021; 16:30	Report	Score by quarters: 2–3, 5–0, 3–4, 1–4 PSO: 4–5			Tbilisi Olympic Pool, Tbilisi; Referees: Michael Goldenberg (USA), Christos Kourtidis (GRE)
30 June 2021; 16:30	Report	Shushiashvili, Vapenski 3	Goals	Vuksanovic 4	Tbilisi Olympic Pool, Tbilisi; Referees: Michael Goldenberg (USA), Christos Kourtidis (GRE)

==== Semifinals ====
30 June 2021; 18:15	Report	Greece	4–8	Montenegro	Tbilisi Olympic Pool, Tbilisi; Referees: Nenad Periš (CRO), Sébastien Dervieux (FRA)
30 June 2021; 18:15	Report	Score by quarters: 2–2, 1–0, 0–4, 1–2			Tbilisi Olympic Pool, Tbilisi; Referees: Nenad Periš (CRO), Sébastien Dervieux (FRA)
30 June 2021; 18:15	Report	four players 1	Goals	Matković 2	Tbilisi Olympic Pool, Tbilisi; Referees: Nenad Periš (CRO), Sébastien Dervieux (FRA)

30 June 2021; 20:00	Report	United States	10–8	Italy	Tbilisi Olympic Pool, Tbilisi; Referees: Dion Willis (RSA), Stanko Ivanovski (MNE)
30 June 2021; 20:00	Report	Score by quarters: 4–4, 2–3, 3–0, 1–1			Tbilisi Olympic Pool, Tbilisi; Referees: Dion Willis (RSA), Stanko Ivanovski (MNE)
30 June 2021; 20:00	Report	Daube 3	Goals	three players 2	Tbilisi Olympic Pool, Tbilisi; Referees: Dion Willis (RSA), Stanko Ivanovski (MNE)

==== Seventh place game ====
1 July 2021; 16:15	Report	Georgia	5–10	France	Tbilisi Olympic Pool, Tbilisi; Referees: Vojin Putniković (SRB), Adil Aimbetov (KAZ)
1 July 2021; 16:15	Report	Score by quarters: 1–3, 1–3, 1–3, 2–2			Tbilisi Olympic Pool, Tbilisi; Referees: Vojin Putniković (SRB), Adil Aimbetov (KAZ)
1 July 2021; 16:15	Report	five players 1	Goals	Vernoux 3	Tbilisi Olympic Pool, Tbilisi; Referees: Vojin Putniković (SRB), Adil Aimbetov (KAZ)

==== Fifth place game ====
1 July 2021; 14:30	Report	Kazakhstan	10–17	Japan	Tbilisi Olympic Pool, Tbilisi; Referees: Frank Ohme (GER), Vakhtang Mebuke (GEO)
1 July 2021; 14:30	Report	Score by quarters: 2–3, 5–5, 2–2, 1–7			Tbilisi Olympic Pool, Tbilisi; Referees: Frank Ohme (GER), Vakhtang Mebuke (GEO)
1 July 2021; 14:30	Report	Ruday 4	Goals	Arai, Koppu 3	Tbilisi Olympic Pool, Tbilisi; Referees: Frank Ohme (GER), Vakhtang Mebuke (GEO)

==== Third place game ====
1 July 2021; 18:00	Report	Greece	10–8	Italy	Tbilisi Olympic Pool, Tbilisi; Referees: Sébastien Dervieux (FRA), Michael Goldenberg (USA)
1 July 2021; 18:00	Report	Score by quarters: 3–4, 2–1, 4–1, 1–2			Tbilisi Olympic Pool, Tbilisi; Referees: Sébastien Dervieux (FRA), Michael Goldenberg (USA)
1 July 2021; 18:00	Report	Genidounias 3	Goals	Bodegas 4	Tbilisi Olympic Pool, Tbilisi; Referees: Sébastien Dervieux (FRA), Michael Goldenberg (USA)

==== Final ====
1 July 2021; 19:45	Report	Montenegro	9–8	United States	Tbilisi Olympic Pool, Tbilisi; Referees: Nenad Periš (CRO), Alessandro Severo (ITA)
1 July 2021; 19:45	Report	Score by quarters: 2–0, 2–2, 3–2, 2–3			Tbilisi Olympic Pool, Tbilisi; Referees: Nenad Periš (CRO), Alessandro Severo (ITA)
1 July 2021; 19:45	Report	Ivović 5	Goals	Daube 3	Tbilisi Olympic Pool, Tbilisi; Referees: Nenad Periš (CRO), Alessandro Severo (ITA)

=== Final ranking ===
Rank	Team
Gold medal	Montenegro
Silver medal	United States
Bronze medal	Greece
4	Italy
5	Japan
6	Kazakhstan
7	France
8	Georgia

=== Awards ===
The awards were announced on 1 July 2021.

Award	Player
MVP	(Montenegro) Aleksandar Ivović
Best goalkeeper	(United States) Drew Holland
Topscorer	(Japan) Yusuke Inaba
