= NO Patras =

Greek water polo club

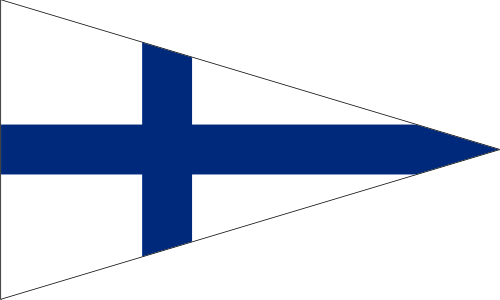
- Full name: Naftikos Omilos Patras
- Sports: Water polo, swimming
- Founded: 1929
- Arena: NOP Arena
- Colours: Blue, white
- Championships: 1935, 1937, 1938, 1939, 1940, 1945, 1946, 1950, 1995

NO Patras (NOP), (Greek: Ναυταθλητικός Όμιλος Πατρών = Nautical Club of Patras), is a water polo club participating in the First Division of the Greek Championship (A1 Ethniki).

== History ==
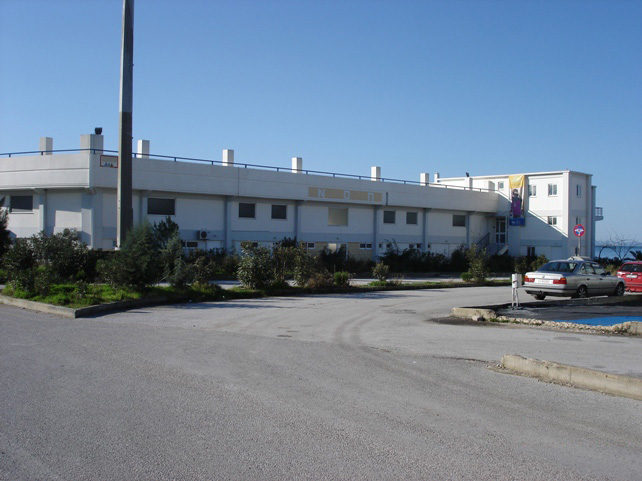
NO Patras aquatic center, Akti Dymeon, Patras

NOP was founded on April 19, 1929, in Patras, Western Greece and immediately became one of the protagonists of Greek water polo, dominating the 1930s and 1940s by winning 8 Greek Championships. During the next decades the club continually participated at the First Division (with the exception of six seasons in the Second Division/A2 Ethniki). The club also reached 8 times the final of the Greek Water Polo Cup, winning the trophy in 1995. NO Patras was the runner-up of the LEN Trophy in 1999.

== Honours ==
- National Titles: 9
- Men
  - Greek Championship
    - Winners (8): 1935, 1937, 1938, 1939, 1940, 1945, 1946, 1950
  - Greek Cup
    - Winners (1): 1995
    - finalists (7): 1957, 1958, 1992, 1996, 1997, 1998, 2005
  - LEN Euro Cup
    - finalists (1): 1999

== Rankings in the Greek First Division (A1 & A Ethniki) ==
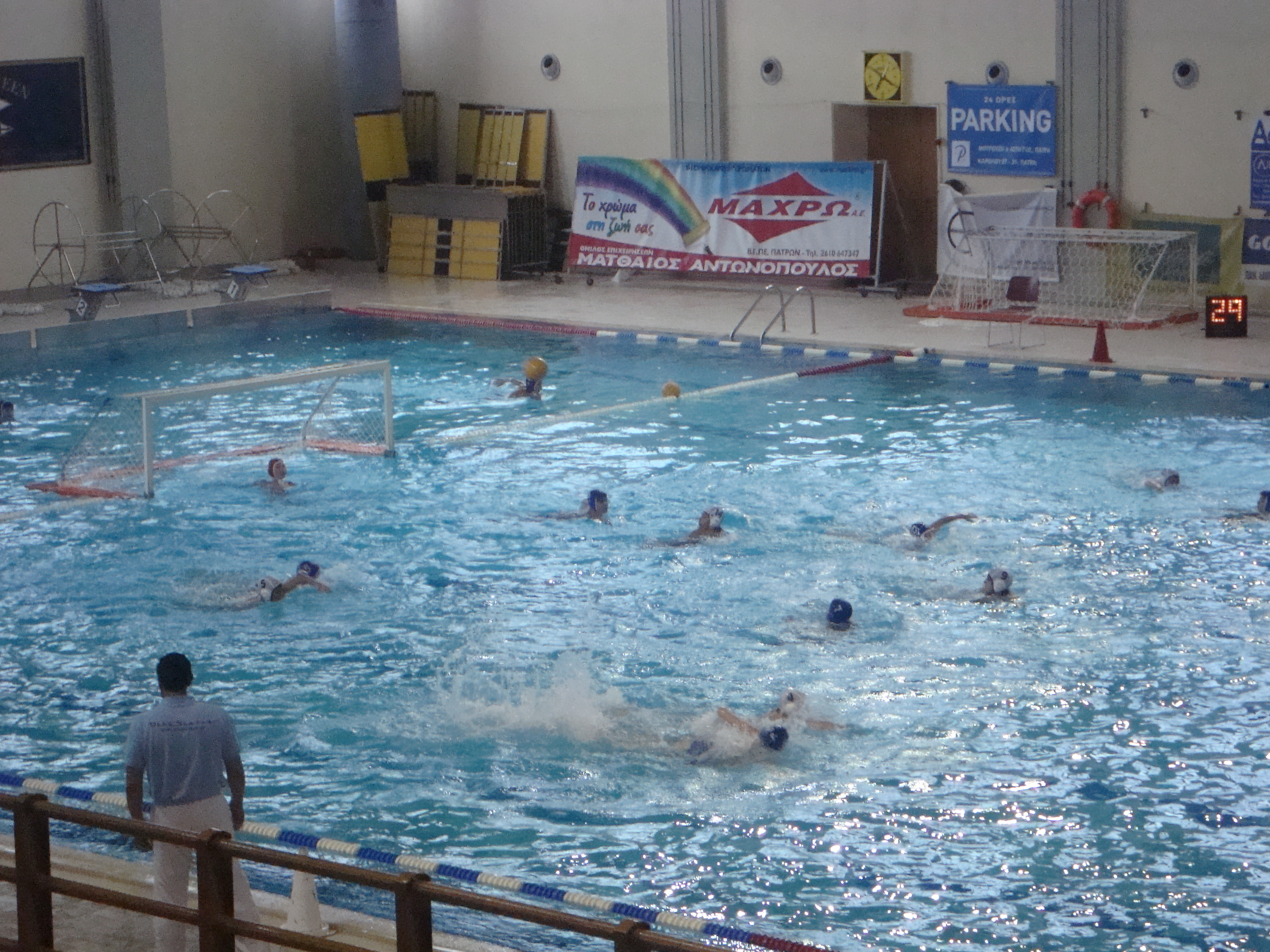
NO Patras, 2011 tournament

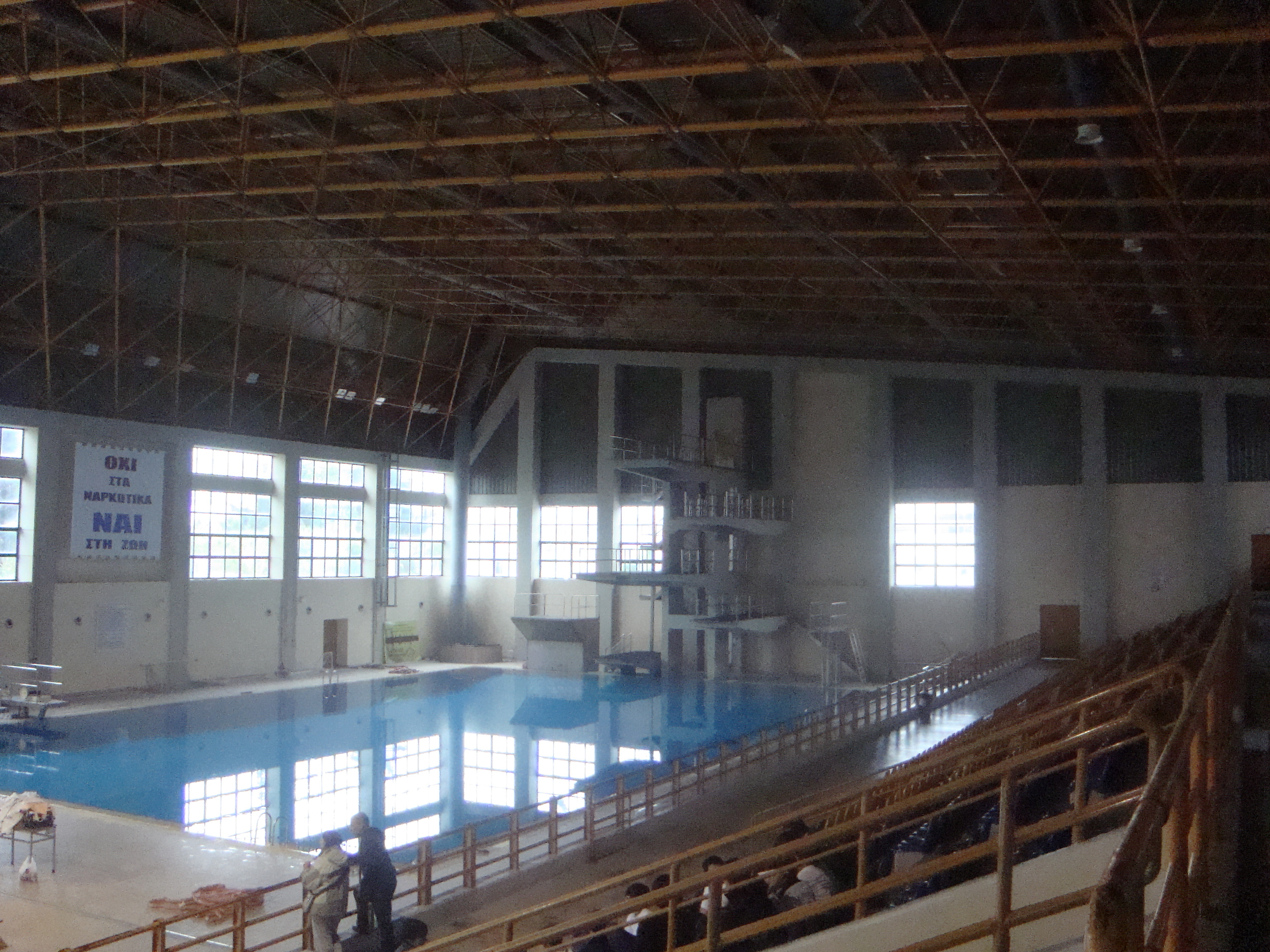
Antonios Pepanos aquatic center, Koukouli (Patras).

A1 League: 24 participations

| Season | Rank |
|---|---|
| 1929-30 | 6th |
| 1930-31 | 3rd |
| 1931-32 | - |
| 1932-33 | 5th |
| 1933-34 | 4th |
| 1934-35 | 1st |
| 1935-36 | 2nd |
| 1936-37 | 1st |
| 1937-38 | 1st |
| 1938-39 | 1st |
| 1939-40 | 1st |
| 1940-44 | World War II |
| 1944-45 | 1st |
| 1945-46 | 1st |
| 1946-47 | 2nd |
| 1947-48 | - |
| 1948-49 | 2nd |
| 1949-50 | 1st |
| 1950-51 | 2nd |

| Season | Rank |
|---|---|
| 1951-52 | 2nd |
| 1952-53 | 3rd |
| 1953-54 | - |
| 1954-55 | 3rd |
| 1955-56 | 2nd |
| 1956-57 | 5th |
| 1957-58 | 2nd |
| 1958-59 | 2nd |
| 1959-60 | 3rd |
| 1960-61 | 2nd |
| 1961-62 | 2nd |
| 1962-63 | 3rd |
| 1963-64 | 3rd |
| 1964-65 | 3rd |
| 1965-66 | 3rd |
| 1966-67 | 7th |
| 1967-68 | 3rd |
| 1968-69 | 5th |
| 1969-70 | 5th |

| Season | Rank |
|---|---|
| 1970-71 | 6th |
| 1971-72 | 5th |
| 1972-73 | 5th |
| 1973-74 | 4th |
| 1974-75 | 4th |
| 1975-76 | 4th |
| 1976-77 | 7th |
| 1977-78 | 6th |
| 1978-79 | 7th |
| 1979-80 | 8th |
| 1980-81 | 5th |
| 1981-82 | 6th |
| 1982-83 | 8th |
| 1983-84 | 9th |
| 1984-85 | 10th |
| 1985-86 | 7th |
| 1986-87 | 7th |
| 1987-88 | A2 |
| 1988-89 | 8th |

| Season | Rank |
|---|---|
| 1989-90 | A2 |
| 1990-91 | 5th |
| 1991-92 | 5th |
| 1992-93 | 5th |
| 1993-94 | 5th |
| 1994-95 | 5th |
| 1995-96 | 3rd |
| 1996-97 | 3rd |
| 1997-98 | 3rd |
| 1998-99 | 7th |
| 1999-00 | 6th |
| 2000-01 | 7th |
| 2001-02 | 10th |
| 2002-03 | 7th |
| 2003-04 | 3rd |
| 2004-05 | 7th |
| 2005-06 | 11th |
| 2006-07 | A2 |
| 2007-08 | A2 |

| Season | Rank |
|---|---|
| 2008-09 | 7th |
| 2009-10 | 8th |
| 2010-11 | 9th |
| 2011-12 | 10th |
| 2012-13 | 12th |
| 2013-14 | A2 |
| 2014-15 | A2 |
| 2015-16 | A2 |
| 2016-17 | 11th |
| 2017-18 | A2 |
| 2018-19 | A2 |
| 2019-20 | A2 |

== Greek Cup ==
In the Greek Water Polo Cup, N.O. Patras has reached the final 7 times, winning the trophy once. The team was the Greek Cup Winner in 1995, when they defeated Vouliagmeni 13-12 in the OAKA Indoor Aquatic Centre.

It was defeated in the following finals:

| 1958 | to Ethnikos Piraeus | 5–2 |
| 1992 | to Olympiacos | 9–8 |
| 1996 | to Vouliagmeni | 11–8 |
| 1997 | to Olympiacos | 9–8 |
| 1998 | to Olympiacos | 10–8 |
| 2005 | to Ethnikos Piraeus | 12–8 |

== European Cups ==
The greatest honour of NO Patras was in 1999 when they reached the LEN Trophy double finals against Újpest Budapest. In the first final, in Patras, NOP was defeated 7-12, while it won 9-10 in the second final in Budapest. Before reaching the final, NOP had eliminated Montpellier, Crişul Oradea, Adalar and Dynamo Lviv. In the quarter-finals they defeated Primorac Kotor and in the semi-finals the Real Canoe NC.

Another successful year for NOP in Europe was in 1992, when they reached the semi-finals of the LEN Cup Winners' Cup.
