= Aris Water Polo Club =

Greek water polo club

Aris Thessaloniki Water Polo Club is a Water Polo Club from Thessaloniki, Greece, part of A.S. Aris Thessaloniki multi-sport club. Aris currently participates in the second division, but it is the 4th most successful team in championship titles in Greece. Its home ground is Poseidoneio Hall in Thessaloniki.

== Honours ==
Greek League

- Winners (4): 1927–28, 1928–29, 1929–30, 1931–32
- Runners-up (1): 1930–31

Greek Cup

- Runners-up (2): 1954–55, 1984–85
