= Greek Water Polo Cup =

Water polo competition in Greece

Greek Water Polo cup
- Countries: Greece
- Confederation: KOE
- Founded: 1953
- Domestic championship: Greek championship
- Current winner: Olympiacos Piraeus
- Most titles: Olympiacos Piraeus (27)

The Greek Water Polo cup is the second most important competition of Greek men's waterpolo and is organised by KOE (Hellenic Swimming Federation). It was first held in 1953. Initially started as a competition in memory of Pantelis Psychas, Greek athlete of the swimming. The competition was interrupted from 1959 to 1983. Moreover, it wasn't held in 1993-94 season. From 1998-99 season the Final Four system was instituted. Olympiacos Piraeus have won the most titles (27), followed by Ethnikos Piraeus (12). Olympiacos is the team with the most appearances in finals (33) and at the same time holds the record for the most consecutive wins (9).

== Title holders ==
- 1953 Ethnikos Piraeus
- 1954 Ethnikos Piraeus
- 1955 Ethnikos Piraeus
- 1956 Ethnikos Piraeus
- 1957 Ethnikos Piraeus
- 1958 Ethnikos Piraeus
- 1959–83 Not held
- 1983–84 Ethnikos Piraeus
- 1984–85 Ethnikos Piraeus
- 1985–86 ANO Glyfada
- 1986–87 ANO Glyfada
- 1987–88 Ethnikos Piraeus
- 1988–89 ANO Glyfada
- 1989–90 NO Chios
- 1990–91 Ethnikos Piraeus
- 1991–92 Olympiacos
- 1992–93 Olympiacos
- 1993–94 Not held
- 1994–95 NO Patras
- 1995–96 NO Vouliagmeni
- 1996–97 Olympiacos
- 1997–98 Olympiacos
- 1998–99 NO Vouliagmeni
- 1999–00 Ethnikos Piraeus
- 2000–01 Olympiacos
- 2001–02 Olympiacos
- 2002–03 Olympiacos
- 2003–04 Olympiacos
- 2004–05 Ethnikos Piraeus
- 2005–06 Olympiacos
- 2006–07 Olympiacos
- 2007–08 Olympiacos
- 2008–09 Olympiacos
- 2009–10 Olympiacos
- 2010–11 Olympiacos
- 2011–12 NO Vouliagmeni
- 2012–13 Olympiacos
- 2013–14 Olympiacos
- 2014–15 Olympiacos
- 2015–16 Olympiacos
- 2016–17 NO Vouliagmeni
- 2017–18 Olympiacos
- 2018–19 Olympiacos
- 2019–20 Olympiacos
- 2020–21 Olympiacos
- 2021–22 Olympiacos
- 2022–23 Olympiacos
- 2023–24 Olympiacos
- 2024–25 Olympiacos
- 2025–26 Olympiacos

== Finals ==
Season	City	Winner	Finalist	Score
1952–53	Athens	Ethnikos OFPF	Olympiacos SFP	5–4 (ext)
1953–54	Athens	Ethnikos OFPF	Olympiacos SFP	12–0
1954–55	Athens	Ethnikos OFPF	Aris Thessaloniki	1–0 (w/o)
1955–56	Athens	Ethnikos OFPF	Held in a round-robin with the participation of 4 teams.	
1956–57	Athens	Ethnikos OFPF	Olympiacos SFP	6–4 (ext)
1957–58	Athens	Ethnikos OFPF	NO Patras	5–2
1958–83	Not held			
1983–84	Athens	Ethnikos OFPF	ANO Glyfada	8–5
1984–85	Athens	Ethnikos OFPF	Aris Thessaloniki	8–7
1985–86	Piraeus	ANO Glyfada	NO Vouliagmeni	5–4
1986–87	Athens	ANO Glyfada	NO Vouliagmeni	10–7
1987–88	Athens	Ethnikos OFPF	NO Vouliagmeni	8–6
1988–89	Athens	ANO Glyfada	NO Vouliagmeni	10–8 (ext)
1989–90	Athens	NO Chios	ANO Glyfada	8–5 (ext)
1990–91	Athens (Marousi)	Ethnikos OFPF	ANO Glyfada	10–7
1991–92	Athens (Marousi)	Olympiacos SFP	NO Patras	9–8
1992–93	Athens (Marousi)	Olympiacos SFP	ANO Glyfada	8–4
1993–94	Not held			
1994–95	Athens (Marousi)	NO Patras	NO Vouliagmeni	13–12
1995–96	Athens (Marousi)	NO Vouliagmeni	NO Patras	11–8
1996–97	Athens (Marousi)	Olympiacos SFP	NO Patras	9–8
1997–98	Athens (Marousi)	Olympiacos SFP	NO Patras	10–8
1998–99	Kerkyra	NO Vouliagmeni	Olympiacos SFP	8–7
1999–00	Piraeus (Nikaia)	Ethnikos OFPF	Olympiacos SFP	12–11 (ext)
2000–01	Patras	Olympiacos SFP	NO Vouliagmeni	9–7
2001–02	Volos	Olympiacos SFP	NO Vouliagmeni	10–9 (ext)
2002–03	Chios	Olympiacos SFP	NO Chania	14–5
2003–04	Athens (Marousi)	Olympiacos SFP	NO Vouliagmeni	6–5
2004–05	Thessaloniki	Ethnikos OFPF	NO Patras	12–8
2005–06	Arta	Olympiacos SFP	Panionios	16–5
2006–07	Kalamata	Olympiacos SFP	Ethnikos OFPF	11–5
2007–08	Tripoli	Olympiacos SFP	Panionios	10–4
2008–09	Ptolemaida	Olympiacos SFP	Panionios	9–6
2009–10	Ermoupoli	Olympiacos SFP	Panionios	7–6 (ext)
2010–11	Kalymnos	Olympiacos SFP	Panionios	10−8
2011–12	Argostoli	NO Vouliagmeni	NO Chios	6−4
2012–13	Lamia	Olympiacos SFP	NO Vouliagmeni	6−5
2013–14	Athens (Palaio Faliro)	Olympiacos SFP	NO Vouliagmeni	11−10
2014–15	Karpenisi	Olympiacos SFP	Panathinaikos	18−10
2015–16	Vouliagmeni	Olympiacos SFP	NO Vouliagmeni	12−5
2016–17	Karpenisi	NO Vouliagmeni	Olympiacos SFP	8−7
2017–18	Chios	Olympiacos SFP	ANO Glyfada	14−8
2018–19	Karpenisi	Olympiacos SFP	NO Vouliagmeni	6−4
2019–20	Chios	Olympiacos SFP	Ethnikos OFPF	18−6
2020–21	Vouliagmeni	Olympiacos SFP	AEK Athens	20−4
2021–22	Larissa	Olympiacos SFP	NO Vouliagmeni	9−8
2022–23	Patras	Olympiacos SFP	Panathinaikos	14−4
2023–24	Vouliagmeni	Olympiacos SFP	Apollon Smyrnis	16−8
2024–25	Volos	Olympiacos SFP	Panathinaikos	22−9
2025–26	Athens (Vari)	Olympiacos SFP	Panathinaikos	13−12

== Performance by club ==
Club	Winner	Finalist	Years won
Olympiacos SFP	27	6	1992, 1993, 1997, 1998, 2001, 2002, 2003, 2004, 2006, 2007, 2008, 2009, 2010, 2011, 2013, 2014, 2015, 2016, 2018, 2019, 2020, 2021, 2022, 2023, 2024, 2025, 2026
Ethnikos OFPF	12	2	1953, 1954, 1955, 1956, 1957, 1958, 1984, 1985, 1988, 1991, 2000, 2005
NO Vouliagmeni	4	13	1996, 1999, 2012, 2017
ANO Glyfada	3	5	1986, 1987, 1989
NO Patras	1	6	1995
NO Chios	1	1	1990
Panionios	–	5	—
Panathinaikos	–	4	—
Aris Thessaloniki	–	2	—
NO Chania	–	1	—
AEK Athens	–	1	—
Apollon Smyrnis	–	1	—

== MVPs and Top Scorers ==
Year	MVP	Club	Top Scorer	Club
1984	–		Antonis Aronis (20)	Ethnikos Piraeus
1985	–		Nikos Venetopoulos (15)	Iraklis Thessaloniki
1986	–		Tasos Papanastasiou "Pilotos" (14)	ANO Glyfada
1987	–		Giannis Lastoridis (14)	NO Kavala
1988	–		Thodoris Moustakaridis (10)	Ethnikos Piraeus
1988	–		Charis Pavlidis (10)	Aris Thessaloniki
1989	–		Christos Mantzouridis (32)	Iraklis Thessaloniki
1990	–		Tasos Papanastasiou «Gatos» (23)	ANO Glyfada
1991	–		Christos Mantzouridis (32)	Iraklis Thessaloniki
1992	–		Nikos Venetopoulos (32)	Olympiacos
1993	–		Alexandros Papanellopoulos (17)	NAO Kerkyra
1995	–		Teo Lorantos (16)	NO Vouliagmeni
1996	–		Dimitris Seletopoulos (16)	NO Chalcis
1997	–		Dmitry Apanasenko (26)	NO Chios
1998	–		Thodoris Kalakonas (17)	Ethnikos Piraeus
1999	Giorgos Afroudakis	NO Vouliagmeni	Tasos Papanastasiou "Pilotos" (16)	Panathinaikos
2000	Thodoris Kalakonas	Ethnikos Piraeus	Adrian Cretu (21)	NO Chios
2001	Thodoris Hatzitheodorou	Olympiacos	Thodoris Hatzitheodorou (16)	Olympiacos
2002	Thodoris Hatzitheodorou	Olympiacos	Giorgos Afroudakis (14)	NO Vouliagmeni
2003	Nicos Doulas	NO Chios	Manthos Voulgarakis (13)	NO Chania
2004			Giannis Thomakos (15)	Olympiacos
2005	Dimitris Mazis	Ethnikos Piraeus	Argyris Theodoropoulos (16)	Olympiacos
2006	Thodoris Hatzitheodorou	Olympiacos	Giannis Fountoulis (12)	NO Chios
2007	Giorgos Doskas	Olympiacos	Zachos Anastasiadis (9)	Panionios
2008	Slobodan Nikić	Olympiacos	Slobodan Nikić (13)	Olympiacos
2009	Slobodan Nikić	Olympiacos	Mimis Alichanidis (13)	P.A.O.K.
2010	Thodoris Hatzitheodorou	Olympiacos	Andreas Miralis (16)	Panionios
2011	Giannis Fountoulis	Olympiacos	Petre Santa (11)	NO Chios
2012	Christos Afroudakis	NO Vouliagmeni	Dimitrios Tingas (7)	NO Vouliagmeni
2013	Giannis Fountoulis	Olympiacos	Blai Mallarach (7)	Olympiacos
2014	Kostas Mourikis	Olympiacos	Christos Afroudakis (10)	NO Vouliagmeni
2015	Manolis Mylonakis	Olympiacos	Angelos Vlachopoulos (9)	Olympiacos
2016	Angelos Vlachopoulos	Olympiacos	Stelios Argyropoulos (13)	Ethnikos Piraeus
2017	Manos Zerdevas	NO Vouliagmeni	Christos Afroudakis (6)	NO Vouliagmeni
2017	Manos Zerdevas	NO Vouliagmeni	Albert Español (6)	Olympiacos
2017	Manos Zerdevas	NO Vouliagmeni	Jovan Šarić (6)	P.A.O.K.
2018	Giannis Fountoulis	Olympiacos	Alexandros Papanastasiou (10)	ANO Glyfada
2019	Alexandros Gounas	Olympiacos	Alexandros Gounas (8)	Olympiacos
2019	Alexandros Gounas	Olympiacos	Giorgos Dervisis (8)	Olympiacos
2019	Alexandros Gounas	Olympiacos	Dimitrios Tingas (8)	NO Vouliagmeni
2020	Maro Joković	Olympiacos	Alexandros Gounas (11)	Olympiacos
2021	Dinos Genidounias	Olympiacos	Dinos Genidounias (13)	Olympiacos
2022	Manos Zerdevas	Olympiacos	Filip Filipović (5)	Olympiacos
2022	Manos Zerdevas	Olympiacos	Stathis Kalogeropoulos (5)	NO Vouliagmeni
2023	Dinos Genidounias	Olympiacos	Dinos Genidounias (7)	Olympiacos
2024	Alexandros Papanastasiou	Olympiacos	Takis Dimou (10)	Olympiacos
2025	Dinos Genidounias	Olympiacos	Dinos Genidounias (8)	Olympiacos
2025	Dinos Genidounias	Olympiacos	Gergő Zalánki (8)	Olympiacos
2026	Dinos Genidounias	Olympiacos	Gergő Zalánki (8)	Olympiacos
