= NE Patras =

N.E. Patras
- Full name: Naftathlitiki Enosi Patron
- Founded: 2006
- League: (Greece) A1 Ethniki Water Polo
- Based in: Patras, Greece
- Arena: Antonios Pepanos aquatic center (capacity: 4,000)
- Colors: Blue, White
- Website: https://nep.org.gr/

NE Patras (NEP), Nautical Union of Patras (Ναυταθλητική Ένωση Πατρών), is a water polo and swimming club situated in Patras, Greece.

== History ==
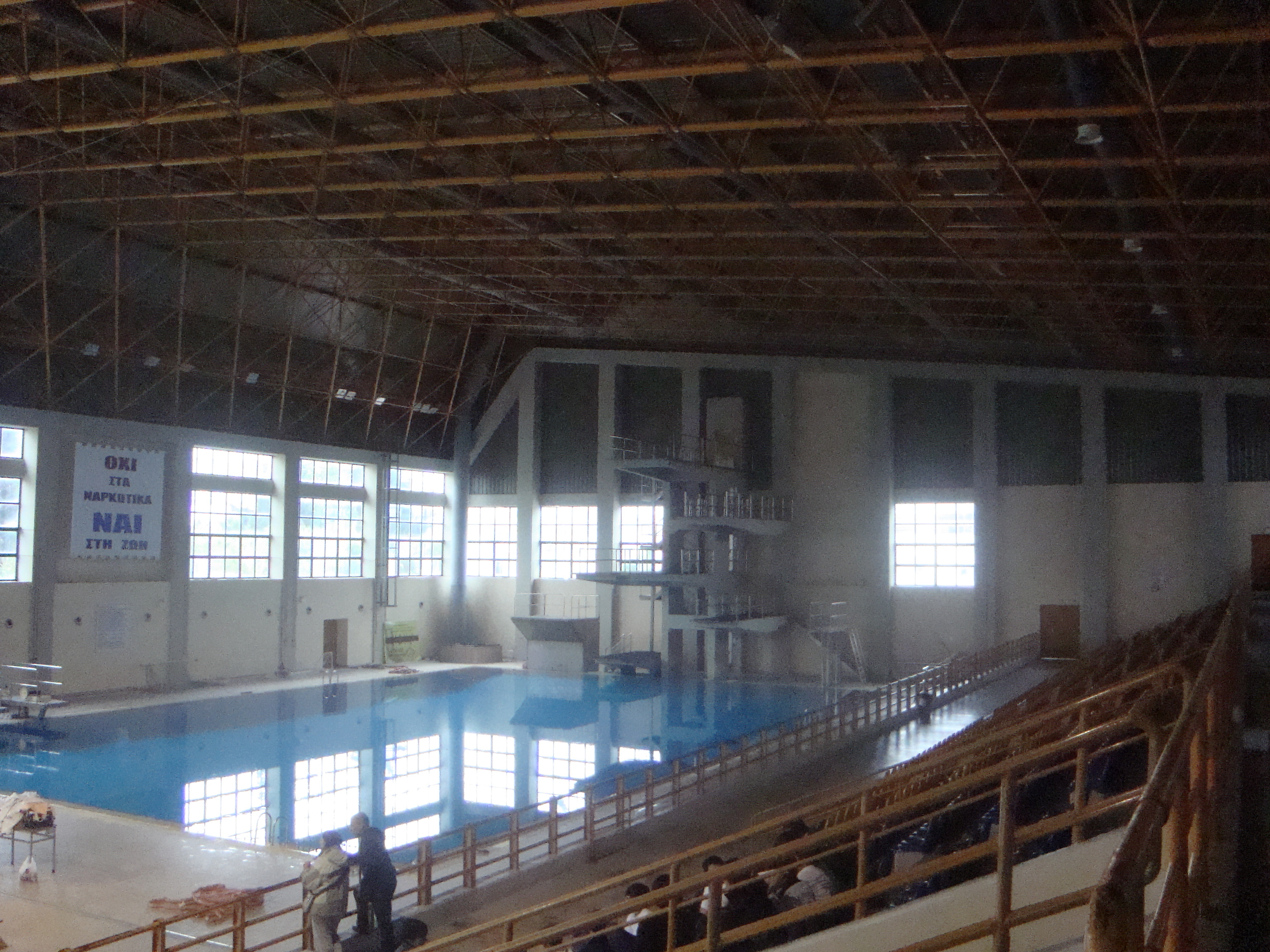
Antonios Pepanos aquatic center, Koukouli (Patras).

NEP was founded in 2006 in Patras, Western Greece with the unification of two nautical clubs of the city: Thriamvos Patras (founded in 1976) and Poseidon Patras (founded in 1982).

The club is today participating in the Second Division/A2 Ethniki of the Greek Championship of men. Women are participating in the first division of greek championship of women.

NEP has participated in the First Division (A1 Ethniki) and the A1 Ethniki Women's, reaching in both department the League's fourth place. In 2010, NEP Women's team reached the Women's LEN Trophy final four, ending up in the third place.

== Honours ==
- Women
  - A1 Ethniki Women participation: 2006, 2007, 2008, 2009, 2010, 2011, 2012, 2013
  - Women's LEN Trophy participation: 2007, 2008, 2010
- Men
  - A1 Ethniki participation: 2008, 2009, 2010, 2011
  - LEN Euro Cup participation: 2010

== Gallery ==
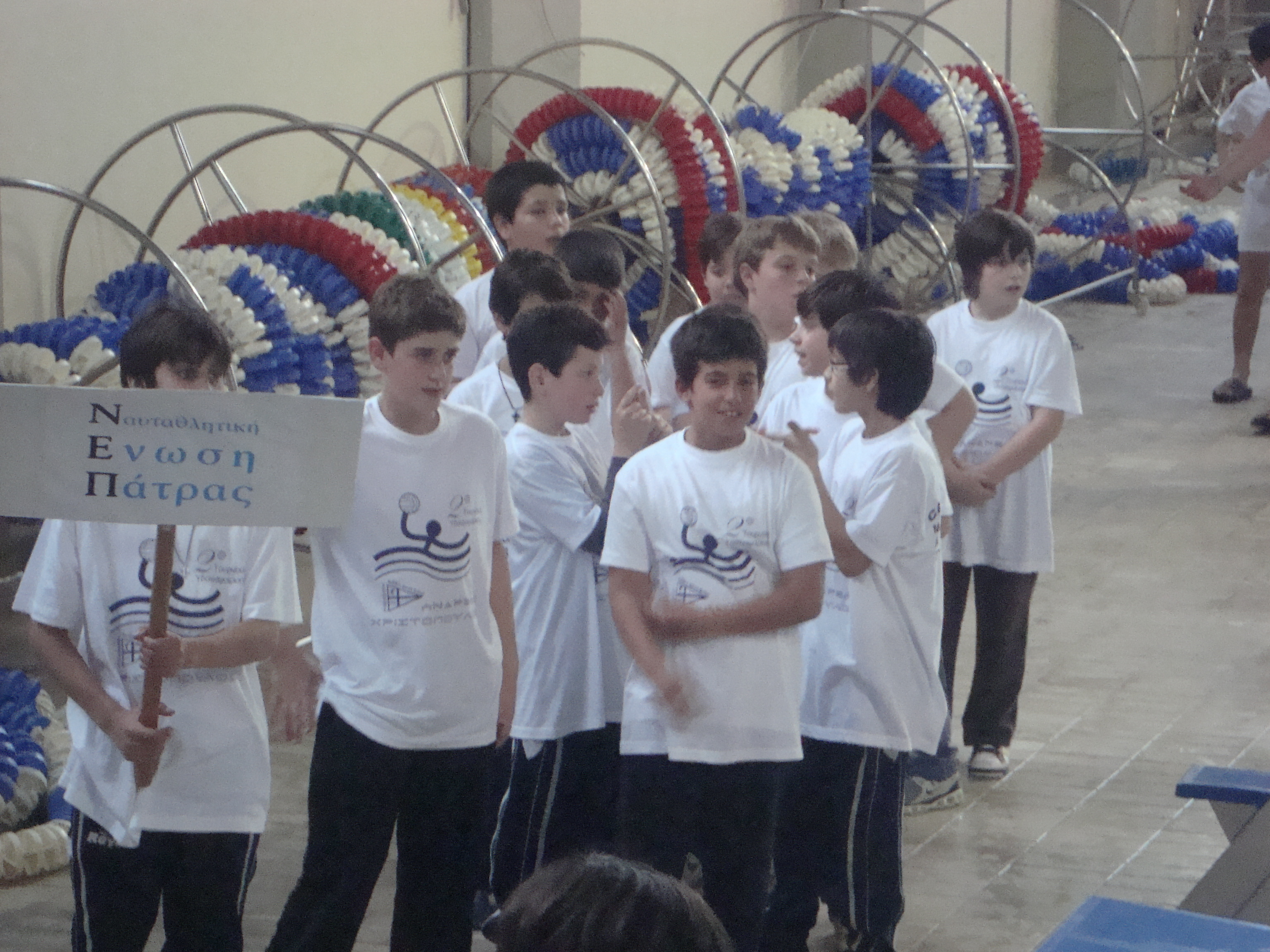
NE Patras children's swimming department, 2011.
