= NO Chios =

Greek aquatic club

- Founded: 1930
- League: A1 Ethniki Water Polo
- Based in: Chios, Greece
- Arena: Ionian Natatorium of Chios
- Colors: Blue, White
- President: Dimitris Skapinakis
- Championships: 1 Greek Cup
- Website: noxiou.gr

Nautical Club of Chios (Greek: Ναυτικός Όμιλος Χίου) is an aquatic club based in Chios. It was founded in 1930. Chios plays almost constantly in A1 Ethniki (first division of Greek Water Polo championship) and it has won a Greek Cup. One time also it was the runner-up of the championship.

== History ==
NO Chios was founded by prominent residents of Chios in 1930. At first was a club for vessel owners. Nevertheless, in 1932 evolved to a sport club. The first natatorium was near the port of Chios. During 40s decade the club declined due to World War. The club's premises were used by German army as fort. During 50s it started the reorganisation of the club. At the beginning of 60s the club faced problems but a new administration helped the club to surpass them. Since 1966, Water Polo team plays constantly in A1 Ethniki (first division). It has won a Cup and has finished in the first places of the championship many times.

=== Recent seasons ===
Season	Division	Place	Notes
1999-00	A1 Ethniki	7th	
2000-01	A1 Ethniki	6th	
2001-02	A1 Ethniki	7th	
2002-03	A1 Ethniki	4th	
2003-04	A1 Ethniki	7th	
2004-05	A1 Ethniki	4th	
2005-06	A1 Ethniki	5th	
2006-07	A1 Ethniki	3rd	
2007-08	A1 Ethniki	4th	
2008-09	A1 Ethniki	6th	
2009-10	A1 Ethniki	9th	
2010-11	A1 Ethniki	5th	
2011-12	A1 Ethniki	3rd	Finalist Greek Cup
2012-13	A1 Ethniki	3rd	
2013-14	A1 Ethniki	7th	
2014-15	A1 Ethniki	9th	
2015-16	A1 Ethniki	8th	

== Honours ==
- Greek Championship
  - Runners-up (1): 1997
- Greek Water Polo Cup
  - Winner (1): 1990
  - Runners-up (1): 2012
