= Hellenic Swimming Federation =

Sports governing body in Greece

Hellenic Swimming Federation Κολυμβητική Ομοσπονδία Ελλάδος
- Sport: Water polo, swimming, Artistic swimming, diving, FinSwimming, Open Water Swimming
- Jurisdiction: Greece
- Abbreviation: (ΚΟΕ)
- Founded: 1927
- Affiliation: International Swimming Federation (FINA); European Swimming League (LEN); European Aquatics, World Aquatics
- Headquarters: 236, Syggrou Ave., Kallithea, Attica
- Location: Athens, Greece
- President: Kyriakos Giannopoulos
- Secretary: Dimitrios Kyrkos

Official website
- www.koe.org.gr

The Hellenic Swimming Federation (Greek: Κολυμβητική Ομοσπονδία Ελλάδος) founded in 1927, is the aquatics national federation for Greece. It oversees competition in 4 Olympic aquatic sports (swimming, synchronized swimming, diving and water polo).

It is affiliated to:

- FINA, the International Swimming Federation
- LEN, the European Swimming League
- HOC, the Hellenic Olympic Committee.

== See also ==
- Greece men's national water polo team
- Greece women's national water polo team
- List of Greek records in swimming
