= 2014–15 A1 Ethniki (men's water polo) =

A1 Ethniki
- Season: 2014–15
- Champions: Olympiacos; 29th title
- Relegated: Panionios; Nireas Lamia
- Top goalscorer: Ioannis Fountoulis (108 goals)
- Biggest home win: Olympiacos 28–3 Panionios
- Biggest away win: N. Lamia 3–31 Olympiacos
- Highest scoring: N. Lamia 3–31 Olympiacos

The 2014–15 A1 Ethniki is the 84th season of the Greek premier Water polo league and the 29th of A1 Ethniki. The winner of the league was Olympiacos, which beat Panathinaikos in the league's playoff's finals. It was the first final of the eternal enemies in Water Polo Championship. The clubs Panionios and Nireas Lamias (withdrawn shortly before the end of the championship) were relegated to the Greek A2 League.

== Team information ==
Location of teams in 2014-15 A1 Ethniki

The following 12 clubs compete in the A1 Ethniki during the 2014–15 season:

A1 Ethniki
Team	City	Pool	Founded	Colours
Chios	Chios	Ionikó natatorium	1930	
Ethnikos	Piraeus	Papastrateio natatorium	1923	
Glyfada	Glyfada	Alymou natatorium	1946	
Kalamaki	Alimos		1947	
Nireas Lamias	Lamia	Lamia natatorium	1998	
Olympiacos	Piraeus	Papastrateio natatorium	1925	
Palaio Faliro	Palaio Faliro			
Panathinaikos	Athens	Olympic Aquatic Centre	1930	
Panionios	Nea Smyrni	Nea Smyrni natatorium	1985	
PAOK	Thessaloniki	Ptolemaida natatorium	1931	
Vouliagmeni	Vouliagmeni	NOV natatorium	1937	
Ydraikos	Hydra			

== Regular season ==
=== Standings ===
	Team	Pld	W	D	L	GF	GA	Diff	Pts
1	Olympiacos	22	22	0	0	389	85	+304	66
2	Ethnikos Piraeus	22	18	0	4	219	174	+45	54
3	Vouliagmeni	22	16	1	5	222	133	+89	49
4	Panathinaikos	22	14	2	6	204	153	+51	44
5	PAOK	22	12	2	8	208	211	−3	38
6	Ydraikos	22	9	5	8	165	166	−1	32
7	ANO Glyfada	22	9	0	13	161	201	−40	27
8	NO Kalamaki	22	8	1	13	150	205	−55	25
9	NO Chios	22	6	2	14	162	197	−35	20
10	Palaio Faliro	22	5	1	16	163	241	−78	16
11	Panionios	22	5	4	13	153	248	−95	16
12	Nireas Lamias	22	0	0	22	114	290	−176	−3 *

Championship Playoff
Relegation Playout
Relegation

Pld - Played; W - Won; D - Drawn; L - Lost; GF - Goals for; GA - Goals against; Diff - Difference; Pts - Points.

- Nireas Lamias was docked 3 points.

==== Schedule and results ====
1. round ( 2014.11.15 )
ANO Glyfada – Vouliagmeni	7–9
Panathinaikos – Olympiacos	2–11
Palaio Faliro – Kalamaki	4–6
Ethnikos – Panionios	16–9
Chios – PAOK	9–9
Ydraikos – Nireas Lamias	11–4

2. round ( 2014.11.22 )
ANO Glyfada – Palaio Faliro	8–9
Vouliagmeni – Nireas Lamias	18–5
PAOK – Ydraikos	10–8
Panionios – Chios	11–9
Olympiacos – Ethnikos	15–4
Kalamaki – Panathinaikos	4–10

3. round ( 2014.11.29 )
Ydraikos – Panionios	11–11
Nireas Lamias – PAOK	6–13
Palaio Faliro – Vouliagmeni	7–11
Panathinaikos – ANO Glyfada	10–5
Ethnikos – Kalamaki	15–8
Chios – Olympiacos	1–18

4. round ( 2014.12.06 )
Kalamaki – Chios	8–5
ANO Glyfada – Ethnikos	7–8
Palaio Faliro – Panathinaikos	4–14
Vouliagmeni – PAOK	8–8
Panionios – Nireas Lamias	5–0*
Olympiacos – Ydraikos	17–2

5. round ( 2014.12.13 )
Ydraikos – Kalamaki	8–9
Nireas Lamias – Olympiacos	3–31
PAOK – Panionios	11–8
Panathinaikos – Vouliagmeni	6–5
Ethnikos – Palaio Faliro	13–11
Chios – ANO Glyfada	8–6

6. round ( 2014.12.20 )
Kalamaki – Nireas Lamias	12–9
ANO Glyfada – Ydraikos	3–7
Palaio Faliro – Chios	8–6
Panathinaikos – Ethnikos	11–10
Vouliagmeni – Panionios	13–4
Olympiacos – PAOK	19–3

7. round ( 2015.01.10 )
Chios – Panathinaikos	7–12
Ydraikos – Palaio Faliro	11–8
Nireas Lamias – ANO Glyfada	8–11
PAOK – Kalamaki	10–8
Panionios – Olympiacos	4–19
Ethnikos – Vouliagmeni	11–8

8. round ( 2015.01.17 )
Vouliagmeni – Olympiacos	5–8
Kalamaki – Panionios	8–6
ANO Glyfada – PAOK	11–6
Palaio Faliro – Nireas Lamias	20–7
Panathinaikos – Ydraikos	6–6
Ethnikos – Chios	8–3

9. round ( 2015.01.24 )
Olympiacos – Kalamaki	14–2
Chios – Vouliagmeni	5–8
Ydraikos – Ethnikos	7–10
Nireas Lamias – Panathinaikos	7–12
PAOK – Palaio Faliro	16–10
Panionios – ANO Glyfada	6–12

10. round ( 2015.01.31 )
Ethnikos – Nireas Lamias	12–4
Chios – Ydraikos	8–8
Vouliagmeni – Kalamaki	9–8
ANO Glyfada – Olympiacos	5–14
Palaio Faliro – Panionios	8–7
Panathinaikos – PAOK	9–4

11. round ( 2015.02.04 )
Panionios – Panathinaikos	6–11
Olympiacos – Palaio Faliro	21–6
Kalamaki – ANO Glyfada	6–7
Ydraikos – Vouliagmeni	3–9
Nireas Lamias – Chios	6–12
PAOK – Ethnikos	9–13

12. round ( 2015.02.07 )
Vouliagmeni – ANO Glyfada	14–5
Kalamaki – Palaio Faliro	9–8
Olympiacos – Panathinaikos	16–7
Panionios – Ethnikos	6–14
PAOK – Chios	11–9
Nireas Lamias – Ydraikos	3–14

13. round ( 2015.02.14 )
Palaio Faliro – ANO Glyfada	9–10
Nireas Lamias – Vouliagmeni	6–14
Ydraikos – PAOK	8–6
Chios – Panionios	12–4
Ethnikos – Olympiacos	4–15
Panathinaikos – Kalamaki	6–4

14. round ( 2015.02.21 )
Panionios – Ydraikos	9–9
PAOK – Nireas Lamias	16–10
Vouliagmeni – Palaio Faliro	14–4
ANO Glyfada – Panathinaikos	8–13
Kalamaki – Ethnikos	4–7
Olympiacos – Chios	17–2

15. round ( 2015.02.28 )
Chios – Kalamaki	13–6
Ethnikos – ANO Glyfada	12–5
Panathinaikos – Palaio Faliro	10–3
PAOK – Vouliagmeni	7–5
Nireas Lamias – Panionios	6–8
Ydraikos – Olympiacos	8–14

16. round ( 2015.03.07 )
Kalamaki – Ydraikos	4–6
Olympiacos – Nireas Lamias	21–2
Panionios – PAOK	10–12
Vouliagmeni – Panathinaikos	8–6
Palaio Faliro – Ethnikos	8–11
ANO Glyfada – Chios	7–6

17. round ( 2015.03.14 )
Nireas Lamias – Kalamaki	8–13
Ydraikos – ANO Glyfada	7–4
Chios – Palaio Faliro	17–5
Ethnikos – Panathinaikos	9–8
Panionios – Vouliagmeni	3–16
PAOK – Olympiacos	5–19

18. round ( 2015.03.21 )
Panathinaikos – Chios	15–4
Palaio Faliro – Ydraikos	5–6
ANO Glyfada – Nireas Lamias	14–8
Kalamaki – PAOK	10–9
Olympiacos – Panionios	28–3
Vouliagmeni – Ethnikos	9–5

19. round ( 2015.03.28 )
Olympiacos – Vouliagmeni	9–8
Panionios – Kalamaki	8–8
PAOK – ANO Glyfada	11–6
Nireas Lamias – Palaio Faliro	8–12
Ydraikos – Panathinaikos	7–7
Chios – Ethnikos	8–12

20. round ( 2015.04.04 )
Kalamaki – Olympiacos	4–23
Vouliagmeni – Chios	10–8
Ethnikos – Ydraikos	7–6
Panathinaikos – Nireas Lamias	11–4
Palaio Faliro – PAOK	5–11
ANO Glyfada – Panionios	8–7

21. round ( 2015.05.02 )
Nireas Lamias – Ethnikos	0–5*
Ydraikos – Chios	8–5
Kalamaki – Vouliagmeni	4–14
Olympiacos – ANO Glyfada	23–4
Panionios – Palaio Faliro	8–8
PAOK – Panathinaikos	11–9

22. round ( 2015.05.09 )
Panathinaikos – Panionios	9–10
Palaio Faliro – Olympiacos	1–17
ANO Glyfada – Kalamaki	6–5
Vouliagmeni – Ydraikos	7–4
Chios – Nireas Lamias	5–0*
Ethnikos – PAOK	11–10

== Playout and 5th place ==
At the play-out matches Paleo Faliro defeated Panionios. In the matches of ranking for the place 9-10 Chios defeated Faliro. In the matches of ranking for the place 5-6 Ydraikos defeated PAOK.

Play-out			9th place
			9	NC Chios	1
10	Paleo Faliro	2	10	Paleo Faliro	0
11	Panionios	0

== Championship playoff ==
Teams in bold won the playoff series. Numbers to the left of each team indicate the team's original playoff seeding. Numbers to the right indicate the score of each playoff game.

Quarterfinals
3	**Vouliagmeni**	**10**	**10**
6	Ydraikos	6	3
4	**Panathinaikos**	**10**	**11**
5	PAOK	9	6

Semifinals
1	**Olympiacos**	**10**	**10**
3	Vouliagmeni	4	5
2	Ethnikos Piraeus	6	7
4	**Panathinaikos**	**9**	**9**

Final
1	**Olympiacos**	**16**	**8**	**10**
4	Panathinaikos	2	7	6
Third place
2	Ethnikos Piraeus	7	9
3	**Vouliagmeni**	**8**	**10**

=== Final ===
- **1st leg**

27 May; 17:00 (UTC+3)	Report	**Olympiacos**	**16**–2	Panathinaikos	Papastrateio natatorium, Piraeus; Referees: Boudramis, Kourtidis
27 May; 17:00 (UTC+3)	Report	Score by quarters: **2**–0, **3**–1, **5**–1, **6**–0			Papastrateio natatorium, Piraeus; Referees: Boudramis, Kourtidis
27 May; 17:00 (UTC+3)	Report	Mallarach 4	**Goals**	Gerakoudis, Kalogerakos 1	Papastrateio natatorium, Piraeus; Referees: Boudramis, Kourtidis

- **2nd leg**

29 May; 19:00 (UTC+2)	Report	Panathinaikos	7–**8**	**Olympiacos**	Ilisio Swimming Pool, Athens; Referees: Miralis, Birakis
29 May; 19:00 (UTC+2)	Report	Score by quarters: 1–1, 1–**2**, 2–**3**, **3**–2			Ilisio Swimming Pool, Athens; Referees: Miralis, Birakis
29 May; 19:00 (UTC+2)	Report	Kalogerakos, Papadogonas, Theodoropoulos 2	**Goals**	Vlachopoulos 3	Ilisio Swimming Pool, Athens; Referees: Miralis, Birakis

- **3rd leg**

2 June; 20:30 (UTC+2)	Report	**Olympiacos**	**10**–6	Panathinaikos	Papastrateio natatorium, Piraeus; Referees: Skalochoritis, Stavridis
2 June; 20:30 (UTC+2)	Report	Score by quarters: **4**–2, 0–0, 3–3, **3**–1			Papastrateio natatorium, Piraeus; Referees: Skalochoritis, Stavridis
2 June; 20:30 (UTC+2)	Report	Fountoulis 3	**Goals**	Theodoropoulos 2	Papastrateio natatorium, Piraeus; Referees: Skalochoritis, Stavridis

Olympiacos won Championship final series 3–0.

== Final standings ==
Pos	Team
1	Olympiacos
2	Panathinaikos
3	Vouliagmeni
4	Ethnikos Piraeus
5	Ydraikos
6	PAOK
7	ANO Glyfada
8	NO Kalamaki
9	NO Chios
10	Palaio Faliro
11	Panionios
12	Nireas Lamias
