= Panathinaikos Water Polo Club =

Water polo club in Athens, Greece

Panathinaikos Water Polo
- Nicknames: The Trifolium
- Founded: 1928; 98 years ago
- League: Greek Water Polo League; Champions League
- Based in: Athens, Greece
- Arena: Serafio City of Athens
- Colours: Green and White
- President: Dimitris Vranopoulos
- Head coach: Dimitris Mazis
- Website: pao1908.com

Panathinaikos AC Water Polo, founded in 1930, is the water polo department of Panathinaikos A.C., the Athens-based Greek multi-sport club. Despite its early establishment it doesn't have any particular honours so far. The best result it has achieved in the A1 Ethniki Water Polo is the second place.

== History in the Greek Championship ==
Panathinaikos AC Water Polo was initially established in 1930, but three years later it was forced to close because of the lack of a swimming pool. The club was re-established in 1959. Without facing any particular difficulties it won the tournaments of the lower divisions and managed to qualify for the first division 3 years later, in 1962. In the years 1963, 1966, 1967, 1971, 1972, 1973, 1974 Panathinaikos WPC reached the third position. In 1993 PAO WPC returned for another time to second division. Until now PAO WPC have never won a national title.

In 2011 the club took the third place, along with the participation ticket for the first time in its history in the LEN Euroleague. The club ended up in the third place once again in the season 2013-2014. The team finished second for the first time in its history in the season 2014-15.

== Greek Cup ==
In the Greek Water Polo Cup Panathinaikos participated in the final in the seasons 2014-15, 2022-23, 2024-25 and 2025-26.

The team had previously reached the semi-finals in the seasons: 1983-84, 1984-85, 2001-02, 2008-09, 2009-10, 2010-11 and 2011-12.

== European Honours ==
Athens Olympic Aquatic Centre

In its first participation in the LEN Euroleague (2011–12), Panathinaikos succeeded in advancing from the preliminary round to the first group stage. The club succeeded in winning against Kharkiv and VK Primorac Kotor (8-11) but it was eventually eliminated from the second group stage.
Following its elimination from the Euroleague, PAO went on to compete in the LEN Trophy, where it advanced until the round of "16" after winning against Le Ben and eventually having a draw 7-7 against Galatasaray. Finally Panathinaikos did not advance to the quarter-finals after being eliminated by Panionios 6-8 in OAKA, and 13-14 (10-12) in Nea Smirni.

== Current roster ==
Season 2026–27

Number	Nationality	Player	Height	Date of birth
Goalkeepers
1	(United States)	Adrian Weinberg	1.96	25/11/2001
13	(Greece)	Nektarios Iliopoulos	1.98	11/07/2003
Defense
3	(Greece)	Dimitrios Skoumpakis	2.03	18/12/1998
9	(Greece)	Giorgos Nikolaidis	1.88	17/02/2005
15	(United States)	Dylan Woodhead	2.01	25/09/1998
Center
4	(Greece)	Nikos Papanikolaou (C)	1.92	31/08/2000
11	(Greece)	Dimitris Nikolaidis	1.94	10/06/1999
Offense
2	(Greece)	Aristeidis Chalyvopoulos	1.83	20/03/2002
5	(Greece)	Konstantinos Gkiouvetsis	1.91	19/11/1999
6	(Greece)	Nikolas Alvertis	1.88	14/01/1995
7	(Greece)	Nikolaos Kourouvanis	1.87	26/10/2000
8	(Greece)	Efstathios Kalogeropoulos	1.87	28/06/2001
10	(Greece)	Nikolas Papasifakis	1.80	01/04/1998
12	(Italy)	Vincenzo Dolce	1.95	11/05/1995
14	(Greece)	Nikolaos Kopeliadis	1.88	05/08/1996

== Technical and managerial staff ==
Staff
Head coach	(Greece) Dimitris Mazis
Assistant coach	(Greece) Nasos Ireiotis
Assistant coach	(Greece) Makis Voltirakis
Trainer	(Greece) Michalis Vlachos
Physiotherapist	(Greece) Ilias Arvanitakis
Team manager	(Greece) Andreas Papadimitrakopoulos

== Notable players ==
- Nikos Anagnostopoulos
- Georgios Afroudakis
- Giannis Bostantzoglou
- Dimosthenis Dermitzakis
- Petros Egogiannis
- Kostas Kasidokostas
- Grigoris Kasidokostas
- Aris Kefalogiannis
- Theodoros Lorantos
- Konstantinos Loudis
- Fontas Moudatsios
- Ioakeim Marcelos
- Petros Pomonis
- Vangelis Patras
- Tasos Papanastasiou
- Dimitris Seletopoulos
- Robin Lindhout
- Dmitry Apanasenko
- Viktor Rašović
- Dušan Vasić
- Dimitrije Rističević
- Chris Humbert
- Ben Stevenson
