= 2015–16 A1 Ethniki (men's water polo) =

A1 Ethniki
- Season: 2015-16
- Champions: Olympiacos; 30th title
- Top goalscorer: Ioannis Fountoulis (100 goals)

The 2015–16 A1 Ethniki is the 85th season of the Greek premier Water polo league and the 30th of A1 Ethniki.

== Team information ==
Location of teams in 2015-16 A1 Ethniki

The following 12 clubs compete in the A1 Ethniki during the 2015–16 season:

A1 Ethniki
Team	City	Pool	Founded	Colours
Chios	Chios	Ionikó natatorium	1930	
Ethnikos	Piraeus	Papastrateio natatorium	1923	
Glyfada	Glyfada	Alymou natatorium	1946	
Kalamaki	Alimos		1947	
GS Ilioupolis	Ilioupoli			
NE Patras	Patras		2006	
Olympiacos	Piraeus	Papastrateio natatorium	1925	
Palaio Faliro	Palaio Faliro			
Panathinaikos	Athens	Olympic Aquatic Centre	1930	
PAOK	Thessaloniki	Poseidoneio natatorium	1931	
Vouliagmeni	Vouliagmeni	NOV natatorium	1937	
Ydraikos	Hydra			

== Regular season ==
=== Standings ===
Championship Playoff
Relegation Playout

	Team	Pld	W	D	L	GF	GA	Diff	Pts
1	Olympiacos	22	22	0	0	387	72	+315	66
2	Vouliagmeni	22	19	1	2	213	115	+98	58
3	Panathinaikos	22	14	4	4	217	151	+66	46
4	Ydraikos	22	13	3	6	191	176	+15	42
5	Ethnikos	22	12	3	7	189	160	+29	39
6	PAOK	22	10	2	10	198	199	−1	32
7	Glyfada	22	9	3	13	193	192	+1	30
8	Chios	22	9	2	11	143	181	−38	29
9	Palaio Faliro	22	7	2	13	171	207	−36	23
10	Kalamaki	22	3	1	18	151	262	−111	10
11	GS Ilioupolis	22	3	0	19	120	257	−137	9
12	NE Patras	22	0	1	21	103	304	−201	−2

Pld - Played; W - Won; D - Drawn; L - Lost; GF - Goals for; GA - Goals against; Diff - Difference; Pts - Points.

Source: A1 Ethniki

== Playoffs ==
Quarterfinals
4	Ydraikos	11	7	7
5	Ethnikos Piraeus	9	10	12
3	Panathinaikos	12	12	–
6	PAOK	6	6	–

Semifinals
1	Olympiacos	13	13	–
5	Ethnikos Piraeus	7	5	–
2	Vouliagmeni	12	4	12
3	Panathinaikos	10	8	6

Final
1	Olympiacos	11	10	10	–	–
2	Vouliagmeni	3	8	5	–	–
Third place
3	Panathinaikos	7	12	–
5	Ethnikos Piraeus	2	10	–

5th place match
4	Ydraikos	7
6	PAOK	6

== Play outs ==
Relegation series
9	Palaio Faliro	12	17	22	–	–
12	NE Patras	9	6	2	–	–
10	Kalamaki	6	10	5	–	–
11	GS Ilioupolis	3	8	4	–	–

9th place match
9	Palaio Faliro	13
10	Kalamaki	6
11th place match
11	GS Ilioupolis	27
12	NE Patras	2

== Final standings ==
Qualified for the 2016–17 LEN Champions League
Qualified for the 2016–17 LEN Euro Cup
Relegated to the 2016–17 A2 Ethniki

Rank	Team
1st place, gold medalist(s)	Olympiacos
2nd place, silver medalist(s)	Vouliagmeni
3rd place, bronze medalist(s)	Panathinaikos
4	Ethnikos
5	Ydraikos
6	PAOK
7	Glyfada
8	Chios
9	Palaio Faliro
10	Kalamaki
11	GS Ilioupolis
12	NE Patras

== See also ==
- 2015–16 LEN Champions League
- 2015–16 LEN Euro Cup
