= Panionios Water Polo Club =

Greek water polo team

Panionios Water Polo
- Founded: 1985 (refounded)
- League: A1 Ethniki Water Polo
- Based in: Nea Smyrni, Greece
- Arena: Nea Smyrni naratorioum
- Colors
- Head coach: Kostas Dimou
- Website: panionios.gr

Panionios Water Polo Club is the water polo team of Panionios multi sport club. It has got teams both men and women. The men's team of Panionios is playing in A1 Ethniki (first division) and the women's team is also playing in A1 Ethniki Women (first division).

== Men's team ==
Panionios had had a water polo team by the period it was based in Smyrna, before 1922. It kept up the team when it moved in Athens but some time later it was dissolved.
The water polo team of Panionios was refounded again in 1985, after the building of natatorium in Nea Smirni.
In the ’90s, the water polo men section gradually comes back to top levels and participates in the top division A1 Ethniki for several years (1993-1994, 1995-1996, 1997-1998, 1998-1999). However, poor economics cause the section to relegate again to B division. In season 1994-95, Panionios won the championship of A2 Ethniki (second division) and got promoted to A1 Ethniki (first division).
Since 2005, Panionios stars in the championship, finishing in the first places every year. Soonly it had successes in European competitions. It played two times in the final of the LEN Euro Cup (2009 and 2011) but was defeated. Panionios had played five times in the final of the Greek cup but has been defeated in all matches.

=== Recent seasons ===
| Season | Division | Place | Notes |
|---|---|---|---|
| 2001-02 | A2 Ethniki | 1st | Promoted to A1 |
| 2002-03 | A1 Ethniki | 8th | |
| 2003-04 | A1 Ethniki | 4th | |
| 2004-05 | A1 Ethniki | 3rd | |
| 2005-06 | A1 Ethniki | 3rd | Finalist Greek Cup |
| 2006-07 | A1 Ethniki | 5th | |
| 2007-08 | A1 Ethniki | 3rd | Finalist Greek Cup |
| 2008-09 | A1 Ethniki | 2nd | Finalist Greek Cup, Finalist Len Euro Cup |
| 2009-10 | A1 Ethniki | 2nd | Finalist Greek Cup |
| 2010-11 | A1 Ethniki | 4th | Finalist Greek Cup, Finalist Len Euro Cup |
| 2011-12 | A1 Ethniki | 5th | |
| 2012-13 | A1 Ethniki | 9th | |
| 2013-14 | A1 Ethniki | 8th | |
| 2014-15 | A1 Ethniki | 11th | Relegated to A2 |
| 2015-16 | A2 Ethniki | 2nd | Promoted to A1 |
| 2016-17 | A1 Ethniki | 10th | |
| 2017-18 | A1 Ethniki | 11th | Relegated to A2 |
| 2018-19 | A2 Ethniki | 2nd | Promoted to A1 |
| 2019-20 | A1 Ethniki | 8th | |
| 2020-21 | A1 Ethniki | 7th | |

=== Honours ===
- A1 Ethniki
  - Runners-up (2):2009, 2010
- Greek Water Polo Cup
  - Runners-up (5): 2006, 2008, 2009, 2010, 2011
- LEN Euro Cup
  - Runners-up (2):2009, 2011

=== Current roster ===
2020–21
Players:

- (Greece) Konstantinos Limarakis
- (Greece) Matthaios Salteris
- (Greece) Aristos Anagnostou
- (Greece) Gregory Kapetanakis
- (Greece) John spiropoulos
- (Greece) Dimitrios Bouzalas
- (Greece) Kostas Koukounas
- (Greece) George Kalaitzis
- (Greece) Dimitris Dimou
- (Canada) Sean Spooner
- (Greece) Dionysis Braimi
- (Greece) Spyros Gavalas
- (Greece) Jason Dalapas
- (Greece) Dimitris Mosxovelis
- (Greece) Christos helmis
- (Greece) George Pournaras
- (Greece) Nikos Karakasis
- (Egypt) Ahmed Barakat
- (Greece) Kimon Alexiou
- (Greece) Dimokritos Zouridis

Coach:

- (Greece) Kostas Dimou

== Women's team ==
The women team of Panionios was founded in 1988. In season 1993-94 played in first division (A1 Ethniki) but it relegated. It played again in first division from season 2009–10 to 2011–12. In the last season (2012–13) played in A2 Ethniki and finished in second place.

=== Recent seasons ===
| Season | Division | Place | Notes |
|---|---|---|---|
| 2007-08 | A2 Ethniki | 2nd | |
| 2008-09 | A2 Ethniki | 1st | Promoted to A1 |
| 2009-10 | A1 Ethniki | 6th | |
| 2010-11 | A1 Ethniki | 7th | |
| 2011-12 | A1 Ethniki | 8th | Relegated to A2 |
| 2012-13 | A2 Ethniki | 2nd | |
