= ANO Glyfada =

Greek nautical sports club

ANOG Glyfada
- Founded: 1946
- League: A1 Ethniki Water Polo
- Based in: Glyfada, Athens
- Colours
- Club titles: European Titles: 2
- Website: anog.gr

The Athletic Nautical Club of Glyfada , or "ANOG" (Greek: Αθλητικός Ναυτικός Όμιλος Γλυφάδας, "ΑΝΟΓ") was founded by 20 local sportsmen in 1946 and is located in Glyfada, Athens.

The first name of the club was Athletic Club of Glyfada (AOG), (Αθλητικός Όμιλος Γλυφάδας) and the departments was basketball, volleyball, swimming, track and field and last water Polo. In 1956 was founded the club Nautical Athletic Club of Glyfada (NAOG), (Ναυτικός Αθλητικός Όμιλος Γλυφάδας). In 1967 AOG and NAOG merged and the club took the name Athletic Nautical Club of Glyfada (ANOG).

== Departments ==
Swimming, Men's water polo, Women's water polo, Sailing, Tennis. The basketball department of ANOG merged with Esperides BC in 2003.

== Titles ==
- Women's water polo:
  - 2 European championships: 2000, 2003
  - 8 Greek championships: 1989, 1996, 1999, 2000, 2001, 2002, 2004, 2008
- Men's water polo:
  - 4 Greek championships: 1986, 1987, 1989, 1990
  - 3 Greek cups: 1986, 1987, 1989
- Women's basketball:
  - 2 Greek cups: 2002, 2003

== European honours ==
season	women's water polo
1999-00	LEN Euro League Champions
2000-01	LEN Euro League Final
2001-02	LEN Euro League 3rd place
2002-03	LEN Euro League Champions
2003-04	LEN Euro League Final
2005-06	LEN Trophy Final
2006-07	LEN Euro League 3rd place
