= A1 Ethniki Water Polo =

Water polo league in Greece

A1 Ethniki
- Current season, competition or edition: 2024–25 A1 Ethniki
- Sport: Water polo
- Founded: 1927; 99 years ago
- Administrator: Hellenic Swimming Federation
- No. of teams: 16
- Country: Greece
- Confederation: LEN
- Most recent champion: Olympiacos Piraeus (2025–26)
- Most titles: Olympiacos Piraeus (40 titles)
- Broadcaster: ERT
- Level on pyramid: Level 1
- Relegation to: A2 Ethniki Water Polo
- Domestic cup: Greek Cup
- International cups: LEN Champions League; LEN Euro Cup
- Website: koe.org.gr

The A1 Ethniki (Greek: Α1 Εθνική Κατηγορία), often referred to as the Greek Water Polo League, is the highest professional water polo league in Greece. It is run by the Hellenic Swimming Federation. It is considered one of the top national leagues in European water polo, as its clubs have made significant success in European competitions.

Olympiacos Piraeus has conquered the most Greek League titles, with 39. Ethnikos also has the record for consecutive championships, with 18.

== History ==
- 1923-27: Panhellenic Championship (held by SEGAS)
- 1927–28 to 1965-66: Panhellenic Championship (held by Hellenic Swimming Federation)
- 1966–67 to 1985-86: A Ethniki (held by Hellenic Swimming Federation)
- 1986–87 to present: A1 Ethniki (held by Hellenic Swimming Federation)

=== Title holders ===
- 1922–23 Peiraikos
- 1925–26 Ethnikos Piraeus
- 1926–27 Olympiacos Piraeus
- 1927–28 Aris Thessaloniki
- 1928–29 Aris Thessaloniki (2)
- 1929–30 Aris Thessaloniki (3)
- 1930–31 Ethnikos Piraeus (2)
- 1931–32 Aris Thessaloniki (4)
- 1932–33 Olympiacos Piraeus (2)
- 1933–34 Olympiacos Piraeus (3)
- 1934–35 NO Patras
- 1935–36 Olympiacos Piraeus (4)
- 1936–37 NO Patras (2)
- 1937–38 NO Patras (3)
- 1938–39 NO Patras (4)
- 1939–40 NO Patras (5)
- 1941–44 Not held due to WW II
- 1944–45 NO Patras (6)
- 1945–46 NO Patras (7)
- 1946–47 Olympiacos Pireaus (5)
- 1947–48 Ethnikos Piraeus (3)
- 1948–49 Olympiacos Piraeus (6)
- 1949–50 NO Patras (8)
- 1950–51 Olympiacos Piraeus (7)
- 1951–52 Olympiacos Piraeus (8)
- 1952–53 Ethnikos Piraeus (4)
- 1953–54 Ethnikos Piraeus (5)
- 1954–55 Ethnikos Piraeus (6)
- 1955–56 Ethnikos Piraeus (7)
- 1956–57 Ethnikos Piraeus (8)
- 1957–58 Ethnikos Piraeus (9)
- 1958–59 Ethnikos Piraeus (10)
- 1959–60 Ethnikos Piraeus (11)
- 1960–61 Ethnikos Piraeus (12)
- 1961–62 Ethnikos Piraeus (13)
- 1962–63 Ethnikos Piraeus (14)
- 1963–64 Ethnikos Piraeus (15)
- 1964–65 Ethnikos Piraeus (16)
- 1965–66 Ethnikos Piraeus (17)
- 1966–67 Ethnikos Piraeus (18)
- 1967–68 Ethnikos Piraeus (19)
- 1968–69 Ethnikos Piraeus (20) &
  Olympiacos Piraeus (9)
- 1969–70 Ethnikos Piraeus (21)
- 1970–71 Olympiacos Piraeus (10)
- 1971–72 Ethnikos Piraeus (22)
- 1972–73 Ethnikos Piraeus (23)
- 1973–74 Ethnikos Piraeus (24)
- 1974–75 Ethnikos Piraeus (25)
- 1975–76 Ethnikos Piraeus (26)
- 1976–77 Ethnikos Piraeus (27)
- 1977–78 Ethnikos Piraeus (28)
- 1978–79 Ethnikos Piraeus (29)
- 1979–80 Ethnikos Piraeus (30)
- 1980–81 Ethnikos Piraeus (31)
- 1981–82 Ethnikos Piraeus (32)
- 1982–83 Ethnikos Piraeus (33)
- 1983–84 Ethnikos Piraeus (34)
- 1984–85 Ethnikos Piraeus (35)
- 1985–86 ANO Glyfada
- 1986–87 ANO Glyfada (2)
- 1987–88 Ethnikos Piraeus (36)
- 1988–89 ANO Glyfada (3)
- 1989–90 ANO Glyfada (4)
- 1990–91 NO Vouliagmeni
- 1991–92 Olympiacos Piraeus (11)
- 1992–93 Olympiacos Piraeus (12)
- 1993–94 Ethnikos Piraeus (37)
- 1994–95 Olympiacos Piraeus (13)
- 1995–96 Olympiacos Piraeus (14)
- 1996–97 NO Vouliagmeni (2)
- 1997–98 NO Vouliagmeni (3)
- 1998–99 Olympiacos Piraeus (15)
- 1999–00 Olympiacos Piraeus (16)
- 2000–01 Olympiacos Piraeus (17)
- 2001–02 Olympiacos Piraeus (18)
- 2002–03 Olympiacos Piraeus (19)
- 2003–04 Olympiacos Piraeus (20)
- 2004–05 Olympiacos Piraeus (21)
- 2005–06 Ethnikos Piraeus (38)
- 2006–07 Olympiacos Piraeus (22)
- 2007–08 Olympiacos Piraeus (23)
- 2008–09 Olympiacos Piraeus (24)
- 2009–10 Olympiacos Piraeus (25)
- 2010–11 Olympiacos Piraeus (26)
- 2011–12 NO Vouliagmeni (4)
- 2012–13 Olympiacos Piraeus (27)
- 2013–14 Olympiacos Piraeus (28)
- 2014–15 Olympiacos Piraeus (29)
- 2015–16 Olympiacos Piraeus (30)
- 2016–17 Olympiacos Piraeus (31)
- 2017–18 Olympiacos Piraeus (32)
- 2018–19 Olympiacos Piraeus (33)
- 2019–20 Olympiacos Piraeus (34)
- 2020–21 Olympiacos Piraeus (35)
- 2021–22 Olympiacos Piraeus (36)
- 2022–23 Olympiacos Piraeus (37)
- 2023–24 Olympiacos Piraeus (38)
- 2024–25 Olympiacos Piraeus (39)
- 2025–26 Olympiacos Piraeus (40)

== Titles by club ==
No.	Club	Winners	Winning years
1.	Olympiacos Piraeus	40	1927, 1933, 1934, 1936, 1947, 1949, 1951, 1952, 1969*, 1971, 1992, 1993, 1995, 1996, 1999, 2000, 2001, 2002, 2003, 2004, 2005, 2007, 2008, 2009, 2010, 2011, 2013, 2014, 2015, 2016, 2017, 2018, 2019, 2020, 2021, 2022, 2023, 2024, 2025, 2026
2.	Ethnikos Piraeus	38	1926, 1931, 1948, 1953, 1954, 1955, 1956, 1957, 1958, 1959, 1960, 1961, 1962, 1963, 1964, 1965, 1966, 1967, 1968, 1969*, 1970, 1972, 1973, 1974, 1975, 1976, 1977, 1978, 1979, 1980, 1981, 1982, 1983, 1984, 1985, 1988, 1994, 2006
3.	NO Patras	8	1935, 1937, 1938, 1939, 1940, 1945, 1946, 1950
4.	Aris Thessaloniki	4	1928, 1929, 1930, 1932
5.	ANO Glyfada	4	1986, 1987, 1989, 1990
6.	NO Vouliagmeni	4	1991, 1997, 1998, 2012
7.	Peiraikos	1	1923

* The 1969 Championship was shared between Olympiacos and Ethnikos

== Consecutive championships ==
18 in a row

- Ethnikos Piraeus→1953–1970

14 in a row

- Ethnikos Piraeus→1972–1985
- Olympiacos Piraeus→2013–2026

9 in a row

- Olympiacos Piraeus→1999–2005

6 in a row

- NO Patras→1937–1946

5 in a row

- Olympiacos Piraeus→2007–2011

3 in a row

- Aris Thessaloniki→1928–1930

2 in a row

- Olympiacos→1933–1934, 1951–1952, 1992–1993, 1995–1996
- ANO Glyfada→1986–1987, 1989–1990
- NO Vouliagmeni→1997–1998

== Appearances in A' Ethniki (1967―2026) ==
A' Ethniki (National Division) started in 1967, but the Greek championship started in 1923 as a Panhellenic Championship. The Hellenic Swimming Federation declares all championship winning teams as champions from 1928 and onwards. Teams in bold participate in the 2025–26 season.

App	Club
60	**Olympiacos S.F. Piraeus**
58	**Ethnikos O.F. Piraeus**
51	**Chios Nautical Club**
48	**Panathinaikos Athens**
47	**NO Patras**
46	**Vouliagmeni Nautical Club**
46	**Glyfada Athletic Nautical Club**
38	**Palaio Faliro Athletic Club**
31	**P.A.O.K. Thessaloniki**
30	**Chania Nautical Club**
26	**Panionios G.S.S. (Athens)**
16	Iraklis Thessaloniki

App	Club
16	Kerkyra Nautical Athletic Club
14	Volos - Argonaftes Nautical Club
13	Kalamaki Nautical Club
12	**Ydraikos Nautical Club**
10	Aris Thessaloniki
9	**O.F. Thalassis Thessaloniki**
9	**Apollon Smyrnis**
7	Chalcis Nautical Club
7	Ilisiakos Athletic Club Athens
7	**Peristeri Gymnastic Club**
6	Poseidon Ilision SC (Athens)
6	NE Patras

App	Club
5	E.N.O. Egyptioton Athens
5	A.E.K. Athens
4	**Larissa Nautical Club**
3	Argostoli Nautical Club
3	Nireas Chalandri Athletic Club
3	Mytilene Nautical Club
3	G.N.O. Aris Nikaias
2	Nireas Lamia Gymnastic Club
2	Ilioupolis Gymastic Club (Athens)
2	O.Y.K. Volos
1	O.F.I. (Heraklion)
1	Phoenix Piraeus

== Greek clubs in European competitions ==
Club	Champions League				Euro Cup				Cup Winners' Cup (defunct)				Super Cup		
Club	C	Years	RU	SF	C	Years	RU	SF	C	Years	RU	SF	C	Years	RU
Olympiacos Piraeus	2	2002,2018	3	1	–				0		2		1	2002	1
Ethnikos Piraeus	0		0	1	0		0	1	0		0		–		
NO Vouliagmeni	0		0	1	0		1	2	1	1997	0	1	–		
Panionios	0		0	0	0		2	2	–				–		
NO Patras	–				0		1	0	–				–		
