= 2016–17 LEN Champions League squads =

This is a list of the squads with their players that competed at the 2016–17 LEN Champions League from 30 September 2016 to 27 June 2017.

== KS Arkonia Szczecin ==
No.	Name	Date of birth	Position
	(Poland) Michal Diakonow	23 November 1983	Goalkeeper
	(Poland) Aleks Brokmeier	5 November 1994	
	(Poland) Robert Sekula	15 May 1986	
	(Poland) Krystian Lukaszewicz	18 March 1994	
	(Croatia) Luka Nimac	18 April 1995	
	(Poland) Piotr Gorczyca	11 January 1994	
	(Poland) Piotr Lawniczak	1 January 1991	
	(Poland) Dawid Hamera	4 September 2000	
	(Poland) Karol Walkowiak	24 November 1992	
	(Poland) Kacper Maciejczyk	8 January 1998	Goalkeeper
	(Poland) Piotr Szymanski	12 August 1990	
	(Poland) Jakub Gaczynski	28 December 1999	

== CNA Barceloneta ==
No.	Name	Date of birth	Position
	Luka Lozina	6 January 1995	
	Martin Famera	4 November 1988	
	Strahinja Rašović	9 March 1992	
	Viktor Rašović	13 August 1993	
	Marc Minguell	14 January 1985	
	Daniel Lopez Pinedo	16 July 1980	
	Marc Larumbe	30 May 1994	
	Francisco Fernandez	21 July 1986	
	Alberto Munarriz	19 May 1994	
	Marc Roca	21 January 1988	
	Roger Tahull	11 May 1997	
	Miguel Linares	16 April 1997	
	Sergio Prieto	27 October 2000	
	Pau Linares	20 August 2001	
	Salvador Sanchez	17 November 2000	
	Alberto Aviles	21 February 1999	
	Victor Alegre	21 January 2000	
	Blai Mallarach	21 August 1987	
	Alejandro Bustos	17 March 1997	

== AN Brescia ==
No.	Name	Date of birth	Position
	Stefano Guerrato	2 October 1997	
	Christian Presciutti	27 November 1982	
	Marco Del Lungo	1 March 1990	Goalkeeper
	Sava Ranđelović	17 July 1993	
	Valerio Rizzo	21 September 1984	
	Alessandro Nora	24 May 1987	
	Nicholas Presciutti	14 December 1993	
	Zeno Bertoli	22 December 1988	
	Christian Napolitano	22 July 1982	
	Edoardo Manzi	22 June 1998	
	Petar Muslim	26 March 1988	
	Vjekoslav Pasković	23 March 1985	
	Nemanja Ubović	24 February 1991	
	Brando Dian	18 January 1991	
	Stefano Morretti	15 January 1998	

== CF Portuense ==
No.	Name	Date of birth	Position
	Rui Santos	21 October 1982	
	Paulo Andrade	28 May 1992	
	Jorge Nuno Lopes	14 August 1988	
	Nuno Andre Marques	8 February 1992	
	Marco Augusto Carvalho	15 July 1984	
	Manuel Cardoso	16 July 1990	
	Joao Pedro Leite	7 May 1993	
	Joao Pedro Vieira	3 May 1983	
	Sergio Marques	7 September 1992	
	Tiago Aparicio	20 January 1992	Goalkeeper
	Cassio Zanatto	29 June 1998	
	Tiago Paraty	1 September 1993	
	Pedro Maria Andre	30 October 1984	
	Carlos Gomes	14 February 1990	
	Ricardo Santos	14 December 1991	
	Pedro Sousa	9 September 1991	

== VK Crvena Zvezda ==
No.	Name	Date of birth	Position
	Stefan Todorovski	17 February 1998	
	Aleksandar Ignjatović	11 December 1990	
	Branko Peković	7 May 1979	
	Dragan Drasković	1 September 1988	
	Aleksandro Kralj	3 January 1990	Goalkeeper
	Veljko Tankosić	7 November 1997	
	Stefan Ilić	8 March 1995	
	Petar Jović	6 February 1997	
	Zlatan Nikocević	10 April 1999	
	Nikola Nikolov	7 February 1994	
	Mihailo Parezanović	5 March 1992	
	Djordje Ljubenović	2 July 1996	
	Aleksandar Mitrović	7 September 1996	
	Filip Corić	22 June 1995	
	Nikola Bursac	27 November 1998	
	Petar Ivosević	2 August 1987	
	Luka Stamatov	8 August 1999	
	Marko Radović	9 October 2001	

== ASC Duisburg ==
No.	Name	Date of birth	Position
	Jan Bakulo	1 April 1991	
	Dennis Eidner	4 August 1989	
	Manuel Grohs	16 April 1993	
	Christopher Hans	9 September 1995	Goalkeeper
	Kristof Hulmann	6 February 1996	
	Philipp Kalberg	6 August 1993	
	Nils Illinger	15 November 1995	
	Efstratios Manolakis	11 September 1998	
	Nick Moeller	3 February 1996	
	Jan Obschernikat	15 December 1992	
	Julian Real	22 December 1989	
	Moritz Schenkel	4 September 1990	Goalkeeper
	Gilbert Schimanksi	20 April 1995	
	Bastian Schmellenkamp	23 January 1995	
	Paul Schueler	14 June 1987	
	Bela Basso	4 August 2000	

== ZF Eger ==
No.	Name	Date of birth	Position
	Dániel Angyal	29 March 1992	
	Krisztián Bedő	4 May 1993	
	Barnabás Biros	5 June 1997	
	Boris Vapenski	9 October 1990	
	Branislav Mitrović	30 January 1985	Goalkeeper
	Boldizsár Csiszár	3 March 1997	Goalkeeper
	Ádám Decker	29 February 1984	
	Balázs Erdélyi	16 February 1990	
	Balázs Hárai	5 April 1987	
	Norbert Hosnyánszky	4 March 1984	
	Gergő Kovács	2 September 1995	
	Bálint Lőrincz	10 March 1994	
	Milos Ćuk	21 December 1990	
	Uroš Čučković	25 April 1990	
	Gábor Szalai	29 November 1997	
	Levente Mata	15 July 1998	
	Benedek Fejes	8 March 1998	
	Gergő Zsolt Tota	17 November 2000	

== Enka Sport Club ==
No.	Name	Date of birth	Position
	Atilla Sezer	13 September 1975	Goalkeeper
	Boris Letica	2 May 1983	
	Damir Burić	2 December 1980	
	Tugay Ergin	3 January 1993	
	Ruso Yakimovic	5 January 1984	
	Aytac Yegin	16 January 1984	
	Caner Goksu	15 October 1984	
	Arda Inan Akyar	22 June 1990	
	Batukan Bayar	4 July 1992	Goalkeeper
	Atamer Albayrak	29 March 1997	
	Kaan Ozden Yildiz	17 March 1997	
	Berk Alkan	22 April 1998	
	Fatih Acar	22 November 1998	
	Berke Can Yalcin	13 November 1999	
	Ege Kahraman	8 March 1999	
	Arda Isik	12 November 1999	
	Emre Gurdenli	17 May 2000	
	Yusa Han Duzenli	15 September 2001	
	Sercan Garen Demircioglu	22 March 1999	

== Galatasaray ==
No.	Name	Date of birth	Position
	Osman Gulenc	7 July 1992	
	Berk Biyik	1 January 1993	
	Nesfet Ozbek	2 September 1994	
	Berk Gezek	13 November 1992	Goalkeeper
	Oguz Senemoglu	3 July 1995	
	Can Gozusulu	11 February 1991	
	Deniz Balta	30 March 1989	
	Eray Turan	23 February 1998	
	Kaan Gezguc	4 January 2000	
	Ilhan Gorseval	23 May 2000	
	Togan Ozbek	18 June 2001	
	Kaan Hamurculu	29 November 2000	
	Zeki Gurelli	22 March 1999	
	Utku Binkanat	29 February 2000	
	Ozgur Izcan	12 December 2001	
	Doruk Ucer	13 March 2000	
	Kagan Ferik	28 January 2001	
	Stefan Živojinović	8 July 1989	Goalkeeper
	Miloš Korolija	21 November 1981	
	Hikmet Oztemel	27 April 1983	
	Gokmen Dilek	5 February 1999	
	Huseyin Kil	23 July 1999	
	Arda Guclu	4 April 1997	
	Ulvi Akkaya	2 May 1998	
	Kerim Sismanoglu	23 January 1999	

== WASPO Hannover ==
No.	Name	Date of birth	Position
	Roger Kong	22 September 1984	Goalkeeper
	Marin Ban	29 May 1986	
	Erik Marcin Bukowski	18 November 1986	
	Pere Estrany	22 February 1989	
	Felix Haarstick	28 May 1988	
	Alexander Herrmann	12 May 1993	
	Ilja Immermann	7 August 1991	
	Predrag Jokić	3 February 1983	
	Ingo Pickert	24 February 1986	
	Aleksandar Radović	24 February 1987	
	Marton Sagi	16 May 1990	Goalkeeper
	Lukas Taplick	5 May 1990	
	Marek Tkáč	9 March 1995	
	Jorn Winkelhorst	26 December 1991	
	Vincent Winkler	17 August 1998	
	Luka Sekulić	1 July 1987	
	Ante Ćorušić	2 July 1990	
	Darko Braguljan	5 November 1990	
	Mate Balatoni	20 January 1984	
	Luka Sučić	13 December 1992	

== Jadran Carine ==
No.	Name	Date of birth	Position
	Miloš Šćepanović	9 October 1982	Goalkeeper
	Marko Petković	3 March 1989	
	Daniil Merkulov	3 March 1997	
	Danilo Radović	10 March 2001	
	Martin Gardašević	9 October 2000	
	Luka Murišić	5 January 2000	
	Zeljko Kovačić	17 December 1981	
	Slaven Kandić	2 April 1991	Goalkeeper
	Stefan Vidović	8 August 1992	
	Bojan Banićević	9 March 1993	
	Stefan Porobić	18 January 1996	
	Vlado Popadić	25 April 1996	
	Stefan Pješivac	12 December 1996	
	Vladan Spaić	18 June 1997	
	Nikola Moskov	28 October 1997	
	Filip Gardašević	23 May 1997	
	Aleksa Ukropina	28 September 1998	
	Petar Tešanović	26 November 1998	Goalkeeper
	Nikola Brkić	1 September 1998	
	Dušan Banićević	12 October 1998	
	Đuro Radović	20 February 1999	
	Petar Mijušković	1 December 1999	
	Dragan Kolesko	19 June 1997	

== JUG Dubrovnik ==
No.	Name	Date of birth	Position
	Hrvoje Benić	20 April 1992	
	Marko Bijač	12 January 1991	
	Ivo Brailo	14 January 2000	
	Kristijan Culina	12 October 2000	
	Mavro Farčić	12 January 2000	
	Loren Fatović	16 November 1996	
	Javier Garcia Gadea	5 January 1984	
	Toni Jarak	19 March 1998	
	Maro Joković	1 October 1987	
	Filip Kržić	28 August 2000	
	Luka Lončar	26 June 1987	
	Marko Ivanković	17 December 1991	
	Marko Macan	26 April 1993	
	Jacob Merčep	8 February 1998	
	Paulo Obradović	9 March 1986	
	Nikola Pavličević	13 February 1997	
	Pavo Marković	20 April 1985	
	Petar Pejić	8 February 2000	
	Felipe Perrone Rocha	27 February 1986	
	Toni Popadić	5 November 1994	
	Josip Vrlić	25 April 1986	
	Antonio Vukojević	2 March 2000	
	Marko Žuvela	22 December 2001	

== CN Marseille ==
No.	Name	Date of birth	Position
	Frederic Audon	16 March 1979	
	Miroslav Ranđić	28 March 1989	
	Strajo Dimitrije Rističević	7 November 1992	Goalkeeper
	Dušan Marković	3 May 1990	
	Jordan Kremers-Taylor	13 February 1995	
	Mathias Olivon	29 June 1995	
	Nicolas Constantin-Bicari	5 December 1991	
	Thibaut Simon	18 December 1983	
	Guillaume Dino	24 March 1995	
	Igor Kovačević	3 November 1988	
	Alexandre Camarasa	10 June 1987	
	Arshak Hovhannisyan	24 January 1997	Goalkeeper
	Silvian Colodrovschi	2 August 2000	
	Thomas Vernoux	21 March 2002	
	Romain Marion-Vernoux	2 January 2000	
	Alexandre Grimaldi	22 December 1997	
	Jeremy Boughanem	6 May 1998	
	Hugo Roscio	21 May 1999	
	Leonardo Monges	23 March 1999	

== VK Mornar Split ==
No.	Name	Date of birth	Position
	Antonio Buha	9 June 1995	
	Rino Burić	5 April 1997	
	Marino Čagalj	23 June 1994	
	Slavko Ćalić	6 March 1994	
	Karlo Erak	19 April 1995	
	Antun Goreta	30 March 1995	
	Luka Kolar	3 January 1992	
	Karlo Kreković	27 January 1999	
	Ivan Krolo	27 September 1998	
	Marino Marović	20 June 1998	
	Petar Martinović	31 January 1998	
	Hrvoje Miletić	20 March 1999	
	Luka Podrug	20 October 1998	
	Boren Prkić	26 February 1999	
	Toma Rodin	19 June 1989	
	Marin Sparada	6 September 1996	Goalkeeper
	Marin Vrdoljak	3 February 1999	
	Ivan Živković	12 January 1995	
	Antonio Dužević	22 October 1997	

== Olympic Nice ==
No.	Name	Date of birth	Position
	Mathias Bachelier	21 December 1995	
	Arthur Bruyere	8 December 1986	
	Jovan Cakić	17 August 1986	
	Lorris Canovas	7 February 2001	
	David Caumette	28 March 1997	
	Pierre Chandieu	26 September 1998	
	Julien Crosetti	4 July 1994	
	Bogdan Čutović	18 February 1998	
	Remi Garsau	19 July 1984	
	Lukas Guetti	1 April 2000	
	Julien Guilloteau	7 August 1990	
	Emil Morgen Hansen	29 August 1987	
	Michal Izdinsky	23 July 1992	
	Tomas Kopenec	6 July 1993	
	Hugo Lafaurie	17 October 1995	
	Manuel Laversanne	10 May 1987	
	Sebastien Monneret	7 October 1992	
	Jocelyn Mutambayi	11 February 1999	
	Cedric Rocchietta	14 December 1996	
	Theo Zuccarini	31 January 1999	

== Olympiacos ==
No.	Name	Date of birth	Position
	Josip Pavić	15 January 1982	
	Mlađan Janović	11 June 1984	
	Andro Bušlje	4 January 1986	
	Albert Espanol	29 October 1985	
	Kyriakos Pontikeas	9 May 1991	
	Konstantinos Genidounias	3 May 1993	
	Konstantinos Mourikis	11 July 1988	
	Emmanouil Mylonakis	9 April 1985	
	Ioannis Fountoulis	25 May 1988	
	Georgios Ntoskas	11 November 1984	
	Christodoulos Kolomvos	26 October 1988	
	Stefanos Galanopoulos	22 February 1993	
	Stylianos Argyropoulos	2 August 1996	
	Evangelos Delakas	8 February 1985	
	Emmanouil Prekas	28 February 1996	

== DIGI Oradea ==
No.	Name	Date of birth	Position
	Maximilian Costa	21 November 1996	
	Cristian Dobre	12 December 1997	
	Andrei Cretu	21 September 1989	
	Nicolae Diaconu	4 September 1980	
	Gojko Pijetlović	7 August 1983	Goalkeeper
	Florin Dorin Cretu	28 May 1988	Goalkeeper
	Viktor Kovats	13 January 1998	
	Istvan Szabo	13 February 1997	
	Andrei Prioteasa	3 April 1996	
	Bogdan Remes	10 May 1998	
	Tiberiu Negrean	1 September 1988	
	Mihnea Gheorghe	15 January 1994	
	Mihnea Chioveanu	21 August 1987	
	Ramiro Georgescu	27 November 1982	
	Mateja Asanović	30 October 1995	
	Boris Pavlović	12 October 1980	
	Nikola Raden	29 January 1985	
	Raul Gavris	9 November 1998	
	Kálmán Kádár	11 June 1979	

== OSC Budapest ==
No.	Name	Date of birth	Position
	Bence Batori	28 December 1991	
	David Bisztritsanyi	7 June 1987	Goalkeeper
	Toni Josef Nemet	14 January 1994	
	Zsolt Juhasz	8 June 1985	
	Gabor Kovacs	30 April 1989	
	Gabor Hegedus	29 September 1983	
	Miklos Gor-Nagy	8 January 1983	
	Erik Bundschuh	14 July 1989	
	Botond Barabas	8 July 1991	Goalkeeper
	Ádám Nagy	19 May 1998	
	Draško Brguljan	27 December 1984	
	Slobodan Nikić	25 January 1983	
	Ferenc Salamon	11 November 1988	
	Lukas Seman	6 October 1987	
	Balazs Szabo	8 May 1990	
	Gergo Zalanki	26 February 1995	

== VK Partizan ==
No.	Name	Date of birth	Position
	Aleksandar Andrejević	8 April 1996	
	Milutin Belopavlović	19 January 1998	
	Marko Bolović	10 October 1990	
	Lazar Brakočević	14 August 1996	
	Lazar Dobožanov	21 December 1995	
	Radomir Drašović	22 July 1997	
	Nikola Jakšić	17 January 1997	
	Filip Janković	5 October 1996	
	Marko Janković	27 December 1998	
	Nikola Japundžić	11 March 1997	
	Petar Kasum	27 January 1998	
	Đorde Lazić	19 May 1996	
	Nikola Lukić	14 April 1998	
	Marko Manojlović	1 April 1996	
	Aleksandar Radanović	6 August 1997	
	Filip Radojevic	2 November 1997	
	Nikola Radulović	2 December 1995	
	Mihajlo Repanović	10 August 1995	
	Ognjen Stojanović	27 April 1996	
	Dimitrije Šejat	18 March 1999	
	Đorde Tanasković	2 March 1994	
	Nebojša Toholj	16 February 1997	
	Petar Tomić	2 August 1999	
	Petar Velkić	17 April 1998	
	Đorde Vučinić	15 January 1999	

== VK Primorje ==
No.	Name	Date of birth	Position
	Maroš Tkáč	13 July 1996	
	Nathan Power McKenzie	13 February 1993	
	Lovro Paparić	5 August 1999	
	Mateo Saftić	20 January 1999	
	Marko Radulović	6 January 2001	
	Ian Petrić	13 May 1999	
	Sven Augusti	18 March 1999	
	Duje Peroš	15 February 1992	
	Ivan Buljubašić	31 October 1987	
	Fran Čubranić	11 June 1997	
	Mislav Vrlić	4 April 1996	
	Nino Mudražija	21 July 1994	
	Duje Jelovina	29 April 1992	Goalkeeper
	Cosmin Radu	9 November 1981	
	Dario Rakovac	13 August 1996	
	Ante Vukičević	24 February 1993	
	Marko Blažić	11 August 1999	
	Petar Božić	2 June 1999	
	Silvio Poropat	24 January 2000	
	Tin Brubnjak	20 February 2001	
	Antonio Čunko	26 July 1998	

== Pro Recco ==
No.	Name	Date of birth	Position
	Matteo Aicardi	19 April 1986	
	Jacopo Alesiani	18 June 1996	
	Michael Bodegas	3 May 1987	
	Lorenzo Bruni	8 April 1994	
	Francesco Di Fulvio	15 August 1993	
	Edoardo Di Somma	30 September 1996	
	Gonzalo Echenique	27 April 1990	
	Niccolo' Figari	24 January 1988	
	Pietro Figlioli	29 May 1984	
	Filip Filipović	2 May 1987	
	Andrea Fondelli	27 February 1994	
	Aleksandar Ivović	24 February 1986	
	Dušan Mandić	16 June 1994	
	Guillermo Molina Rios	16 March 1984	
	Duško Pijetlović	25 April 1985	
	Sandro Sukno	30 June 1990	
	Stefano Tempesti	9 June 1979	
	Goran Volarević	2 April 1977	

== CN Sabadell ==
No.	Name	Date of birth	Position
	Gonzalo Lopez Escribano	21 March 1989	
	Vicente Matoso	21 June 1993	
	Victor Cabanas	20 November 1992	
	Eric Marsal	9 January 1985	
	Borja Fenoy	6 August 1997	
	Jordi Ernesto Mardones	10 September 1996	
	Oscar Carrillo	18 October 1991	
	Ivan Gallego	13 February 1984	
	Jose Maria Motos	22 June 1992	Goalkeeper
	Jose Javier Bustos	24 February 1994	
	Marc Soler	7 September 1990	
	Abraham Alcaide	1 December 1990	
	Sergi Cabanas	10 February 1996	
	Javier Gorria	24 November 1994	

== Sintez Kazan ==
No.	Name	Date of birth	Position
	Jure Marelja	1 April 1980	
	Nikolay Maksimov	15 November 1972	Goalkeeper
	Ivan Nagaev	30 November 1993	
	Adel Latypov	16 December 1990	
	Alexey Ryzhov-Alenichev	20 February 1989	
	Anton Antonov	1 June 1983	Goalkeeper
	Lev Magomaev	1 February 1989	
	Artem Odintsov	16 January 1988	
	Roman Shepelev	3 August 1993	
	Igor Bychkov	21 January 1994	
	Kirill Nikolaenko	19 July 1989	
	Igor Pliskevich	18 May 1990	
	Albert Zinnatullin	27 April 1990	
	Anvar Galimzyanov	19 November 1990	
	Arslan Zakirov	22 March 1997	
	Timur Shaikhutdinov	15 June 1998	
	Daniil Pronin	29 October 1998	
	Nikita Ekomazov	19 January 1995	
	Aleksandr Smirnov	30 May 1996	

== Spandau 04 ==
No.	Name	Date of birth	Position
	Nikola Dedović	25 January 1992	
	Lucas Gielen	26 November 1990	
	Philipp Gottfried	12 July 1994	
	Spencer Hamby	12 March 1991	
	Tim Hoehne	9 March 1987	
	Maurice Juengling	6 October 1991	
	Mehdi Marzouki	26 May 1987	
	Lukas Kueppers	31 July 1996	
	Laszlo Baksa	29 January 1986	
	Mateo Ćuk	21 February 1990	
	Moritz Oeler	21 October 1985	
	Tobias Preuss	3 August 1988	
	Marin Restović	22 July 1990	
	Rémi Saudadier	20 March 1986	
	Marko Stamm	30 August 1988	
	Tomi Tadin	25 August 1997	
	Luka Goetz	29 March 2001	
	Moritz Ostmann	24 April 2001	
	Luka Vučićević	26 March 2000	

== Steaua Bucharest ==
No.	Name	Date of birth	Position
	Dragos Stoenescu	30 May 1979	Goalkeeper
	Đorđe Filipović	16 April 1983	
	Petru Ianc	15 March 1990	
	Adria Delgado	7 April 1990	
	Daniel Teohari	11 May 1993	
	Andrei Bușilă	10 November 1980	
	Nikola Murišić	16 August 1992	
	Ivan Krizman	26 January 1987	
	Pavel Popescu	29 June 1988	
	Daniel Robu	28 July 1987	
	Andrei Ghiban	12 October 1986	
	Dimitri Goanta		
	Mihai Dragusin	5 January 1984	Goalkeeper
	Iulian Radoi	11 March 1981	
	Codrin Cotrau	15 July 1987	
	Tudor Popescu	26 June 1997	
	Albert Vatrai	22 August 1997	
	Alexandru Pantazi	29 June 1988	

== Szolnoki VSK ==
No.	Name	Date of birth	Position
	Milan Aleksić	13 May 1986	
	Bence Fulop	9 April 1991	
	Živko Gocić	22 August 1982	
	Dávid Jansik	28 February 1991	
	Gábor Kis	27 September 1982	
	Tamas Mezei	14 September 1990	
	Viktor Nagy	24 July 1984	
	Marton Vamos	24 June 1992	
	Denes Varga	29 March 1987	
	Aaron Younger	25 September 1991	
	Ugo Crousillat	27 October 1990	
	Kristof Szatmari	6 January 1997	
	Istvan Kardos	1 September 1995	
	Zsombor Szeghalmi	4 September 2002	
	Milan Kovacs	14 March 2002	
	Peter Kotlar	10 October 2000	
	Tamas Bodoroczki	26 March 2001	
	Patrik Bagi	18 January 2001	
	Zoltan Hangay	17 October 1988	
	Andrija Prlainović	28 April 1987	

== UZSC Utrecht ==
No.	Name	Date of birth	Position
	Casper Landeweer	17 May 1985	
	Yoran Frauenfelder	21 May 1992	
	Hendrik Garos	30 August 1991	Goalkeeper
	Loek Foster	5 June 1993	
	Tycho Huijsen	3 November 1997	
	Stefan Wateler	12 February 1997	
	Mike van den Brink	6 August 1988	
	Jesper Aantjes	24 March 1993	
	Ruben Hoepelman	30 August 1993	Goalkeeper
	Joep van den Bersselaar	2 June 1993	
	Benjamin Hoepelman	26 May 1995	
	Marc Winkelhorst	15 February 1990	
	Bram van den Bersselaar	20 February 1997	
	Jesper Hoepelman		

== Valletta ==
No.	Name	Date of birth	Position
	Jake Tanti	12 June 1998	Goalkeeper
	Jordan Camilleri	14 September 1992	
	Jeremy Abela	10 June 1998	
	Miguel Zammit	19 November 1997	
	Matthew Zammit	1 October 1987	
	Darren Zammit	1 January 1999	
	Zachary Mizzi	3 September 1993	
	Nicholas-Kane Grixti	13 October 1995	
	Alexander Attard Littschwager	19 January 1992	
	Edward Aquilina	22 July 1983	
	Nicholas Bugelli	11 February 1997	
	Michael Spiteri Staines	4 August 1992	
	Ryan Sciortino	18 April 1991	
	Andrea Bianchi	14 March 1986	
	Jacob Sciberras	7 January 2000	
	David Fenech	5 August 1998	
	Kurt Griscti	15 January 1990	

== SM Verona ==
No.	Name	Date of birth	Position
	Dejan Lazović	8 February 1990	
	Valentino Gallo	17 May 1985	
	Giuseppe Valentino	13 August 1990	
	Romain Blary	20 October 1990	
	Antonio Petković	11 January 1986	
	Niccolo' Gitto	11 January 1986	
	Stefano Luongo	5 January 1990	
	Marko Jelača	15 December 1982	
	Cristiano Mirarchi	11 July 1991	
	Giacomo Bini	5 September 1990	
	Andrea Razzi	9 December 1988	
	Arnaldo Deserti	1 April 1979	
	Fabio Viola	9 January 1996	Goalkeeper
	Alessandro Casieri	8 July 1999	
	Gabriel Gennari	4 May 1999	

== NC Vouliagmeni ==
No.	Name	Date of birth	Position
	Dimitrios Dimou	28 September 2000	
	Alessandro Piovan	26 December 2000	
	Vaios Vlachotasios	5 February 1999	
	Stavros Xanthopoulos	4 February 2000	
	Efstathios Kalogeropoulos	28 January 2001	
	Dimitrios Kourouvanis	7 August 1998	Goalkeeper
	Marios Kapotsis	13 September 1991	
	Emmanouil Zerdevas	12 August 1997	
	Nikolaos Delagrammatikas	12 March 1998	
	Kalaitzis Georgios	15 March 1997	
	Achilleas Grammatikos	28 August 2000	
	Nikolaos Kourouvanis	26 October 2000	Goalkeeper
	Christos Afroudakis	23 May 1984	
	Antonios Giannouris	5 July 1999	
	Emmanouil Solanakis	27 April 1994	
	Chrysovalantis Chrysospathis	13 October 1994	
	Konstantinos Gouvis	10 March 1994	
	Dimitrios Tigkas	1 April 1993	
	Theodoros Pateros	21 June 2000	
	Ioannis Velonias	12 March 1993	
	Nikolaos Kopeliadis	5 August 1996	
	Nemanja Vico	19 November 1994	

== ZP Barendrecht ==
No.	Name	Date of birth	Position
	Yoran Lodder	25 September 1996	Goalkeeper
	Oscar Visser	7 March 1991	
	Yorick ter Heegde	31 December 1989	
	Kevin van Baarle	22 July 1993	
	Quint Gerdes	25 May 1994	
	Matthijs de Bruijn	27 May 1977	
	Ruben Dentro	1 December 1996	
	Anthonie van der Velden	16 May 1990	
	Jari Krijgsman	18 January 1996	
	Michael de Kreek	3 February 1989	
	Twan de Kadt	5 July 1989	
	Stephan de Ruijter	8 February 1992	
	Pim Versluis	23 February 1995	Goalkeeper
	Dennis Dieben	13 December 1988	
	Steven Bloemberg	4 January 1996	
	Sean Lichtenberg	20 March 1997	
	Cornelis Hofman	24 July 1975	
	Jacobus Zwetsloot	30 January 1986	
