= 2016 Men's European Water Polo Championship squads =

This article shows all participating team squads at the 2016 Men's European Water Polo Championship, held in Serbia from 10 to 23 January 2016.

== Group A ==
=== Montenegro ===
No.	Name	Date of birth	Position	L/R	Height	Weight	Club
1	Dejan Lazović	8 February 1990	Goalkeeper	R	198 cm (6 ft 6 in)	98 kg (216 lb)	(Italy) Sport Management
2	Draško Brguljan	27 December 1984	Wing	R	194 cm (6 ft 4 in)	88 kg (194 lb)	(Hungary) OSC
3	Vjekoslav Pasković	23 March 1985	Wing	R	181 cm (5 ft 11 in)	85 kg (187 lb)	(Turkey) Galatasaray
4	Antonio Petrović	24 September 1982	Point	R	193 cm (6 ft 4 in)	100 kg (220 lb)	(Croatia) Primorje
5	Darko Brguljan	5 November 1990	Wing	R	182 cm (6 ft 0 in)	99 kg (218 lb)	(Italy) Canottieri Napoli
6	Aleksandar Radović	24 February 1987	Driver	R	191 cm (6 ft 3 in)	98 kg (216 lb)	(Germany) Waspo Hannover
7	Mlađan Janović	11 June 1984	Driver	R	189 cm (6 ft 2 in)	95 kg (209 lb)	(Turkey) Galatasaray
8	Nikola Janović (c)	22 March 1980	Driver	R	191 cm (6 ft 3 in)	100 kg (220 lb)	(Montenegro) Jadran Herceg Novi
9	Aleksandar Ivović	24 February 1986	Driver	R	198 cm (6 ft 6 in)	107 kg (236 lb)	(Italy) Pro Recco
10	Sasa Misić	27 March 1987	Centre forward	R	198 cm (6 ft 6 in)	107 kg (236 lb)	(Russia) Kinef Kirishi
11	Nikola Vukčević	14 November 1985	Centre forward	R	197 cm (6 ft 6 in)	105 kg (231 lb)	(Turkey) Galatasaray
12	Predrag Jokić	3 February 1983	Point	R	188 cm (6 ft 2 in)	102 kg (225 lb)	(Germany) Waspo Hannover
13	Miloš Šćepanović	9 October 1982	Goalkeeper	R	185 cm (6 ft 1 in)	89 kg (196 lb)	(Turkey) Galatasaray
Head coach: Vladimir Gojković

=== Spain ===
No.	Name	Date of birth	Position	L/R	Height	Weight	Club
1	Iñaki Aguilar	9 September 1983	Goalkeeper	R	189 cm (6 ft 2 in)	82 kg (181 lb)	(Spain) Terrassa
2	Alberto Munarriz	19 May 1994	Centre forward	R	197 cm (6 ft 6 in)	105 kg (231 lb)	(Spain) Barceloneta
3	Gonzalo Lopez Escribano	21 March 1989	Driver	R	186 cm (6 ft 1 in)	90 kg (200 lb)	(Spain) Sabadell
4	Marc Roca	21 January 1988	Centre forward	R	188 cm (6 ft 2 in)	94 kg (207 lb)	(Spain) Barceloneta
5	Guillermo Molina Rios (c)	16 March 1984	Driver	R	194 cm (6 ft 4 in)	105 kg (231 lb)	(Italy) AN Brescia
6	Marc Minguell	14 January 1985	Driver	R	186 cm (6 ft 1 in)	93 kg (205 lb)	(Spain) Barceloneta
7	Balázs Szirányi	10 January 1983	Centre forward	R	196 cm (6 ft 5 in)	108 kg (238 lb)	(Spain) Barceloneta
8	Albert Español	29 October 1985	Driver	R	189 cm (6 ft 2 in)	86 kg (190 lb)	(Spain) Barceloneta
9	Roger Tahull	11 May 1997	Centre forward	R	195 cm (6 ft 5 in)	104 kg (229 lb)	(Spain) Barceloneta
10	Francisco Fernández	21 June 1986	Wing	R	185 cm (6 ft 1 in)	84 kg (185 lb)	(Spain) Barceloneta
11	Blai Mallarach	21 August 1987	Wing	L	187 cm (6 ft 2 in)	87 kg (192 lb)	(Greece) Olympiacos
12	Gonzalo Echenique	27 April 1990	Wing	L	194 cm (6 ft 4 in)	96 kg (212 lb)	(Croatia) Primorje
13	Daniel López Pinedo	16 July 1980	Goalkeeper	R	191 cm (6 ft 3 in)	91 kg (201 lb)	(Spain) Barceloneta
Head coach: Gabriel Hernández

=== Netherlands ===
No.	Name	Date of birth	Position	L/R	Height	Weight	Club
1	Eelco Wagenaar	22 November 1991	Goalkeeper	R	196 cm (6 ft 5 in)	90 kg (200 lb)	(Netherlands) Polar Bears
2	Yoran Frauenfelder	21 May 1992	Point	R	195 cm (6 ft 5 in)	95 kg (209 lb)	(Spain) Sant Andreu
3	Jorn Winkelhorst	26 December 1991	Centre forward	R	200 cm (6 ft 7 in)	95 kg (209 lb)	(Spain) Sant Andreu
4	Ruud van der Horst	3 June 1991	Driver	R	192 cm (6 ft 4 in)	95 kg (209 lb)	(Netherlands) Polar Bears
5	Luuk Gielen	26 November 1990	Point	R	205 cm (6 ft 9 in)	100 kg (220 lb)	(Serbia) Partizan
6	Robin Lindhout	25 October 1990	Driver	R	193 cm (6 ft 4 in)	90 kg (200 lb)	(Spain) Mataró
7	Lars Gottemaker	29 July 1987	Wing	L	192 cm (6 ft 4 in)	85 kg (187 lb)	(Netherlands) Het Ravijn
8	Lars Reuten	25 August 1993	Driver	R	192 cm (6 ft 4 in)	90 kg (200 lb)	(Spain) Rubí
9	Joep van den Bersselaar	2 June 1993	Wing	L	193 cm (6 ft 4 in)	90 kg (200 lb)	(Netherlands) UZSC
10	Roeland Spijker (c)	13 March 1985	Point	R	187 cm (6 ft 2 in)	90 kg (200 lb)	(Netherlands) UZSC
11	Jesse Koopman	4 April 1993	Driver	R	193 cm (6 ft 4 in)	90 kg (200 lb)	(Spain) Sabadell
12	Thomas Lucas	25 April 1989	Centre forward	R	200 cm (6 ft 7 in)	95 kg (209 lb)	(Spain) Mataró
13	Ruben Hoepelman	30 August 1993	Goalkeeper	R	190 cm (6 ft 3 in)	90 kg (200 lb)	(Netherlands) UZSC
Head coach: Robin van Galen

=== Slovakia ===
No.	Name	Date of birth	Position	L/R	Height	Weight	Club
1	Lukáš Kozmér	6 December 1993	Goalkeeper	R	196 cm (6 ft 5 in)	88 kg (194 lb)	(France) Olympic Nice
2	Martin Faměra	4 November 1988	Centre forward	R	200 cm (6 ft 7 in)	105 kg (231 lb)	(Spain) Barceloneta
3	Juraj Zaťovič (c)	22 October 1982	Centre forward	R	192 cm (6 ft 4 in)	98 kg (216 lb)	(Slovakia) KVP Nováky
4	Jozef Hrošík	26 March 1981			186 cm (6 ft 1 in)	96 kg (212 lb)	
5	Lukáš Ďurík	2 December 1992	Point	R	198 cm (6 ft 6 in)	111 kg (245 lb)	(Spain) Real Canoe
6	Samuel Baláž	5 January 1994	Centre forward	R	184 cm (6 ft 0 in)	88 kg (194 lb)	(Spain) Sant Andreu
7	Lukáš Seman	6 October 1987	Point	R	204 cm (6 ft 8 in)	127 kg (280 lb)	(Hungary) Szeged
8	Maros Tkáč	13 July 1996	Wing	R	189 cm (6 ft 2 in)	90 kg (200 lb)	(Slovakia) KVP Nováky
9	Tomáš Bielik	19 November 1993	Wing	R	188 cm (6 ft 2 in)	90 kg (200 lb)	(Slovakia) Slávia UK Bratislava
10	Kristián Polovic	19 March 1992	Wing	L	196 cm (6 ft 5 in)	108 kg (238 lb)	(Hungary) Kaposvár
11	Martin Kolárik	18 March 1986	Wing	R	194 cm (6 ft 4 in)	100 kg (220 lb)	(Slovakia) KVP Komárno
12	Tomáš Brúder	7 September 1979	Centre forward	R	190 cm (6 ft 3 in)	95 kg (209 lb)	(Spain) Sant Andreu
13	Michal Gogola	30 May 1980	Goalkeeper	R	185 cm (6 ft 1 in)	96 kg (212 lb)	(Slovakia) KVP Nováky
Head coach: (Spain) Antonio Esteller

== Group B ==
=== Serbia ===
No.	Name	Date of birth	Position	L/R	Height	Weight	Club
1	Gojko Pijetlović	7 August 1983	Goalkeeper	R	194 cm (6 ft 4 in)	92 kg (203 lb)	(Romania) CSM Oradea
2	Dušan Mandić	16 June 1994		L	202 cm (6 ft 8 in)	96 kg (212 lb)	(Italy) Pro Recco
3	Živko Gocić (c)	22 August 1982	Wing	R	193 cm (6 ft 4 in)	91 kg (201 lb)	(Hungary) Szolnok
4	Sava Ranđelović	17 July 1993	Point	R	193 cm (6 ft 4 in)	93 kg (205 lb)	(Italy) Brescia
5	Miloš Ćuk	21 December 1990	Wing	R	191 cm (6 ft 3 in)	91 kg (201 lb)	(Hungary) Eger
6	Duško Pijetlović	25 April 1985	Centre forward	R	192 cm (6 ft 4 in)	91 kg (201 lb)	(Italy) Pro Recco
7	Slobodan Nikić	25 January 1983	Centre forward	R	197 cm (6 ft 6 in)	96 kg (212 lb)	(Turkey) Galatasaray
8	Milan Aleksić	13 May 1986			193 cm (6 ft 4 in)	93 kg (205 lb)	(Hungary) Szolnok
9	Nikola Jakšić	19 January 1997	Driver	R	197 cm (6 ft 6 in)	90 kg (200 lb)	(Serbia) Partizan
10	Filip Filipović	2 May 1987	Wing	L	196 cm (6 ft 5 in)	93 kg (205 lb)	(Italy) Pro Recco
11	Andrija Prlainović	28 April 1988	Wing	R	187 cm (6 ft 2 in)	91 kg (201 lb)	(Italy) Pro Recco
12	Stefan Mitrović	29 March 1988	Wing	R	195 cm (6 ft 5 in)	91 kg (201 lb)	(Hungary) Szolnok
13	Branislav Mitrović	30 January 1985	Goalkeeper	R	191 cm (6 ft 3 in)	91 kg (201 lb)	(Hungary) Eger
Head coach: Dejan Savić

=== Croatia ===
No.	Name	Date of birth	Position	L/R	Height	Weight	Club
1	Josip Pavić (c)	15 January 1982	Goalkeeper	R	195 cm (6 ft 5 in)	90 kg (200 lb)	(Greece) Olympiacos
2	Damir Burić	2 December 1980	Hole Guard	R	205 cm (6 ft 9 in)	115 kg (254 lb)	(Croatia) Primorje
3	Antonio Petković	11 January 1986		R	182 cm (6 ft 0 in)	85 kg (187 lb)	(Italy) Sport Management
4	Luka Lončar	26 June 1987	Centre forward	R	195 cm (6 ft 5 in)	107 kg (236 lb)	(Croatia) Mladost
5	Maro Joković	1 October 1987		L	203 cm (6 ft 8 in)	95 kg (209 lb)	(Croatia) Jug Dubrovnik
6	Luka Bukić	30 April 1994	Wing	R	194 cm (6 ft 4 in)	81 kg (179 lb)	(Croatia) Mladost
7	Ante Vukicević	24 February 1993		R	186 cm (6 ft 1 in)	93 kg (205 lb)	(Croatia) Primorje
8	Andro Bušlje	4 January 1986	Hole Guard	R	200 cm (6 ft 7 in)	115 kg (254 lb)	(Italy) Posillipo
9	Sandro Sukno	30 June 1990		R	200 cm (6 ft 7 in)	93 kg (205 lb)	(Italy) Pro Recco
10	Boris Pavlović	12 October 1980	Centre forward	R	200 cm (6 ft 7 in)	110 kg (240 lb)	(Croatia) Jadran Split
11	Anđelo Šetka	14 September 1985		R	186 cm (6 ft 1 in)	87 kg (192 lb)	(Croatia) Primorje
12	Marko Macan	26 April 1993	Hole Guard	R	195 cm (6 ft 5 in)	98 kg (216 lb)	(Croatia) Jug Dubrovnik
13	Marko Bijač	12 January 1991	Goalkeeper	R	201 cm (6 ft 7 in)	85 kg (187 lb)	(Croatia) Jug Dubrovnik
Head coach: Ivica Tucak

=== France ===
No.	Name	Date of birth	Position	L/R	Height	Weight	Club
1	Rémi Garsau	19 July 1984	Goalkeeper	R	190 cm (6 ft 3 in)	82 kg (181 lb)	(France) CN Marseille
2	Rémi Saudadier	20 March 1986	Centre forward	R	198 cm (6 ft 6 in)	103 kg (227 lb)	(Germany) Spandau 04
3	Igor Kovacevic	3 November 1988	Wing	R	190 cm (6 ft 3 in)	85 kg (187 lb)	(France) CN Marseille
4	Enzo Khasz	13 August 1993	Centre forward	R	203 cm (6 ft 8 in)	105 kg (231 lb)	(France) CN Marseille
5	Romain Blary	20 October 1985	Centre forward	R	195 cm (6 ft 5 in)	103 kg (227 lb)	(France) SNS Strasbourg
6	Thibaut Simon	18 December 1983	Driver	R	192 cm (6 ft 4 in)	98 kg (216 lb)	(France) CN Marseille
7	Ugo Crousillat	27 October 1990	Wing	L	190 cm (6 ft 3 in)	94 kg (207 lb)	(France) CN Marseille
8	Michal Iždinský	23 July 1992	Wing	L	178 cm (5 ft 10 in)	75 kg (165 lb)	(France) Olympic Nice
9	Mehdi Marzouki	26 May 1987	Driver	R	192 cm (6 ft 4 in)	103 kg (227 lb)	(Germany) Spandau 04
10	Manuel Laversanne	10 May 1987	Wing	R	185 cm (6 ft 1 in)	83 kg (183 lb)	(France) Olympic Nice
11	Petar Tomašević	2 January 1989	Driver	R	192 cm (6 ft 4 in)	102 kg (225 lb)	(France) Olympic Nice
12	Alexandre Camarasa (c)	10 June 1987	Centre forward	R	193 cm (6 ft 4 in)	104 kg (229 lb)	(France) CN Marseille
13	Jonathan Moriame	19 June 1984	Goalkeeper	R	203 cm (6 ft 8 in)	104 kg (229 lb)	(France) Noisy-le-Sec
Head coach: Florian Bruzzo

=== Malta ===
No.	Name	Date of birth	Position	L/R	Height	Weight	Club
1	Alan Borg Cole	5 October 1990	Goalkeeper	R	180 cm (5 ft 11 in)	76 kg (168 lb)	(Malta) Neptunes
2	Niki Lanzon (c)	16 September 1980			176 cm (5 ft 9 in)	80 kg (180 lb)	(Malta) Neptunes
3	Jerome Gabarretta	3 June 1990		R	196 cm (6 ft 5 in)	100 kg (220 lb)	(Malta) Sliema
4	Nicholas Bugelli	11 February 1997		R	182 cm (6 ft 0 in)	74 kg (163 lb)	(Malta) Sliema *
5	Mark Meli	23 September 1986		R	189 cm (6 ft 2 in)	94 kg (207 lb)	(Malta) Sliema
6	Matthew Zammit	1 October 1987			196 cm (6 ft 5 in)	118 kg (260 lb)	(Malta) San Giljan
7	Stevie Camilleri	4 July 1987			190 cm (6 ft 3 in)	93 kg (205 lb)	(Italy) Ortigia
8	Jordan Camilleri	14 September 1992		R	186 cm (6 ft 1 in)	88 kg (194 lb)	(Malta) Neptunes
9	John Brownrigg	2 April 1986		R	182 cm (6 ft 0 in)	102 kg (225 lb)	(Malta) Sliema
10	Aurelien Cousin	1 February 1980		R	198 cm (6 ft 6 in)	105 kg (231 lb)	(Malta) San Giljan
11	Ben Plumpton	16 February 1998			180 cm (5 ft 11 in)	76 kg (168 lb)	(Malta) San Giljan
12	Dino Zammit	14 December 1994		L	180 cm (5 ft 11 in)	95 kg (209 lb)	(Malta) San Giljan
13	Nicholas Grixti	13 October 1995	Goalkeeper	R	186 cm (6 ft 1 in)	87 kg (192 lb)	(Malta) ASA Youth Selection
Head coach: Karl Izzo

== Group C ==
=== Italy ===
No.	Name	Date of birth	Position	L/R	Height	Weight	Club
1	Stefano Tempesti (c)	9 June 1979	Goalkeeper		205 cm (6 ft 9 in)	97 kg (214 lb)	(Italy) Pro Recco
2	Francesco Di Fulvio	15 August 1993			188 cm (6 ft 2 in)	82 kg (181 lb)	(Italy) Pro Recco
3	Niccolò Gitto	12 October 1986			189 cm (6 ft 2 in)	76 kg (168 lb)	(Italy) Pro Recco
4	Pietro Figlioli	29 May 1984			192 cm (6 ft 4 in)	97 kg (214 lb)	(Italy) Pro Recco
5	Alex Giorgetti	24 December 1987			186 cm (6 ft 1 in)	78 kg (172 lb)	(Italy) Pro Recco
6	Michael Bodegas	3 May 1987	Centre forward		192 cm (6 ft 4 in)	102 kg (225 lb)	(Italy) Pro Recco
7	Massimo Giacoppo	10 May 1983			184 cm (6 ft 0 in)	92 kg (203 lb)	(Italy) Pro Recco
8	Valentino Gallo	17 July 1985			193 cm (6 ft 4 in)	92 kg (203 lb)	(Italy) Posillipo
9	Christian Presciutti	27 November 1982			185 cm (6 ft 1 in)	84 kg (185 lb)	(Italy) AN Brescia
10	Stefano Luongo	5 January 1990			186 cm (6 ft 1 in)	87 kg (192 lb)	(Italy) Acquachiara
11	Matteo Aicardi	19 April 1986	Centre forward		192 cm (6 ft 4 in)	104 kg (229 lb)	(Italy) Pro Recco
12	Fabio Baraldi	21 March 1990	Centre forward		199 cm (6 ft 6 in)	110 kg (240 lb)	(Italy) Canottieri Napoli
13	Marco Del Lungo	1 March 1990	Goalkeeper		190 cm (6 ft 3 in)	100 kg (220 lb)	(Italy) AN Brescia
Head coach: Alessandro Campagna

=== Romania ===
No.	Name	Date of birth	Position	L/R	Height	Weight	Club
1	Dragoș Stoenescu	30 May 1979	Goalkeeper	R	197 cm (6 ft 6 in)	96 kg (212 lb)	(Romania) Steaua București
2	Cosmin Radu (c)	9 September 1981	Centre forward	L	195 cm (6 ft 5 in)	105 kg (231 lb)	(Croatia) Primorje
3	Tiberiu Negrean	1 September 1988	Driver	R	187 cm (6 ft 2 in)	88 kg (194 lb)	(Romania) CSM Oradea
4	Mihnea Gheorghe	15 January 1994	Driver	R	188 cm (6 ft 2 in)	92 kg (203 lb)	(Romania) Steaua București
5	Nicolae Oanță	14 August 1990	Driver	R	193 cm (6 ft 4 in)	93 kg (205 lb)	(Romania) Sportul Studenţesc
6	Dan Andrei Busila	10 November 1980	Driver	R	202 cm (6 ft 8 in)	110 kg (240 lb)	(Romania) Steaua București
7	Daniel Teohari	11 May 1993	Wing	L	191 cm (6 ft 3 in)	85 kg (187 lb)	(Romania) Steaua București
8	Mihnea Chioveanu	21 August 1987	Centre forward	R	199 cm (6 ft 6 in)	108 kg (238 lb)	(Romania) CSM Oradea
9	Dimitri Goanță	17 July 1987	Driver	R	202 cm (6 ft 8 in)	115 kg (254 lb)	(Romania) Steaua București
10	Roland Szabo	18 September 1996	Driver	R	186 cm (6 ft 1 in)	80 kg (180 lb)	(Romania) CSM Oradea
11	Alexandru Ghiban	12 October 1986	Driver	R	194 cm (6 ft 4 in)	98 kg (216 lb)	(Romania) Steaua București
12	Alex Popoviciu	2 August 1990	Wing	R	190 cm (6 ft 3 in)	80 kg (180 lb)	(Romania) CSM Oradea
13	Marius Tic	9 September 1996	Goalkeeper	R	191 cm (6 ft 3 in)	78 kg (172 lb)	(Romania) Sportul Studenţesc
Head coach: (Serbia) Dejan Stanojević

=== Germany ===
No.	Name	Date of birth	Position	L/R	Height	Weight	Club
1	Roger Kong	21 September 1984	Goalkeeper	R	184 cm (6 ft 0 in)	86 kg (190 lb)	(Germany) Waspo Hannover
2	Erik Bukowski	18 November 1986	Driver	R	186 cm (6 ft 1 in)	86 kg (190 lb)	(Germany) Waspo Hannover
3	Timo van der Bosch	29 November 1993	Point	R	194 cm (6 ft 4 in)	97 kg (214 lb)	(Germany) SSV Esslingen
4	Julian Real (c)	21 December 1989	Point	R	200 cm (6 ft 7 in)	110 kg (240 lb)	(Germany) ASC Duisburg
5	Tobias Preuß	3 August 1988	Wing	R	183 cm (6 ft 0 in)	91 kg (201 lb)	(Germany) Spandau 04
6	Maurice Jüngling	6 October 1991	Point	R	184 cm (6 ft 0 in)	87 kg (192 lb)	(Germany) Spandau 04
7	Heiko Nossek	14 March 1982	Driver	R	190 cm (6 ft 3 in)	100 kg (220 lb)	(Germany) SSV Esslingen
8	Paul Schüler	14 June 1987	Driver	R	184 cm (6 ft 0 in)	96 kg (212 lb)	(Germany) ASC Duisburg
9	Marko Stamm	30 August 1988	Wing	R	186 cm (6 ft 1 in)	99 kg (218 lb)	(Germany) Spandau 04
10	Mateo Cuk	21 February 1990	Centre forward	R	196 cm (6 ft 5 in)	107 kg (236 lb)	(Germany) Spandau 04
11	Marin Restovic	22 July 1990	Wing	L	192 cm (6 ft 4 in)	93 kg (205 lb)	(Germany) Spandau 04
12	Dennis Eidner	4 August 1989	Centre forward	R	180 cm (5 ft 11 in)	110 kg (240 lb)	(Germany) ASC Duisburg
13	Moritz Schenkel	4 September 1990	Goalkeeper	R	203 cm (6 ft 8 in)	105 kg (231 lb)	(Germany) ASC Duisburg
Head coach: Patrick Weissinger

=== Georgia ===
No.	Name	Date of birth	Position	L/R	Height	Weight	Club
1	Nikoloz Shubladze	27 December 1993	Goalkeeper	R	198 cm (6 ft 6 in)	91 kg (201 lb)	
2	Beka Kavtaradze	9 July 1990	Driver	R	189 cm (6 ft 2 in)	102 kg (225 lb)	(Georgia (country)) Lokomotiv Tbilisi
3	Damir Tsrepulia	16 January 1984	Wing	L	190 cm (6 ft 3 in)	98 kg (216 lb)	
4	Marko Elez	9 September 1980			198 cm (6 ft 6 in)	90 kg (200 lb)	(Italy) Trieste
5	Andria Bitadze	17 May 1997	Centre forward	R	202 cm (6 ft 8 in)	105 kg (231 lb)	
6	Marko Jelača	15 December 1982	Point	R	204 cm (6 ft 8 in)	99 kg (218 lb)	(Italy) Sport Management
7	George Khvedeliani	14 April 1988	Point	R	191 cm (6 ft 3 in)	90 kg (200 lb)	(Georgia (country)) Lokomotiv Tbilisi
8	Mikheil Baghaturia	9 May 1987	Wing	R	183 cm (6 ft 0 in)	95 kg (209 lb)	(Georgia (country)) Lokomotiv Tbilisi
9	Zurab Rurua (c)	8 June 1987	Wing	R	187 cm (6 ft 2 in)	90 kg (200 lb)	(Georgia (country)) Lokomotiv Tbilisi
10	Konstantine Gegelashvili	7 May 1983	Centre forward	R	185 cm (6 ft 1 in)	95 kg (209 lb)	(Georgia (country)) Lokomotiv Tbilisi
11	Khvicha Jakhaia	16 September 1996	Point	R	196 cm (6 ft 5 in)	102 kg (225 lb)	
12	Revaz Imnaishvili	9 August 1997	Driver	R	185 cm (6 ft 1 in)	91 kg (201 lb)	
13	Ivan Strujić	13 October 1981	Goalkeeper	R	204 cm (6 ft 8 in)	101 kg (223 lb)	
Head coach: (Montenegro) Jovan Popović

== Group D ==
=== Hungary ===
No.	Name	Date of birth	Position	L/R	Height	Weight	Club
1	Viktor Nagy	24 July 1984	Goalkeeper	R	198 cm (6 ft 6 in)	100 kg (220 lb)	(Hungary) Szolnok
2	Miklós Gór-Nagy	8 January 1983	Driver	R	192 cm (6 ft 4 in)	110 kg (240 lb)	(Hungary) OSC
3	Bence Bátori	28 December 1991	Wing	R	193 cm (6 ft 4 in)	90 kg (200 lb)	(Hungary) OSC
4	Balázs Erdélyi	16 February 1990	Wing	R	196 cm (6 ft 5 in)	94 kg (207 lb)	(Hungary) Eger
5	Márton Vámos	24 June 1992	Wing	L	199 cm (6 ft 6 in)	105 kg (231 lb)	(Hungary) Szolnok
6	Norbert Hosnyánszky	4 March 1984	Wing	R	196 cm (6 ft 5 in)	101 kg (223 lb)	(Hungary) Eger
7	Ádám Decker	29 February 1984	Driver	R	203 cm (6 ft 8 in)	110 kg (240 lb)	(Hungary) OSC
8	Krisztián Manhercz	6 February 1997	Wing	R	185 cm (6 ft 1 in)	84 kg (185 lb)	(Hungary) Szeged
9	Dániel Varga (c)	25 September 1983	Point	R	201 cm (6 ft 7 in)	96 kg (212 lb)	(Hungary) Szolnok
10	Dénes Varga	29 March 1987	Wing	R	193 cm (6 ft 4 in)	97 kg (214 lb)	(Hungary) Szolnok
11	Gábor Kis	27 September 1982	Centre forward	R	194 cm (6 ft 4 in)	110 kg (240 lb)	(Hungary) Szolnok
12	Balázs Hárai	5 April 1987	Centre forward	R	202 cm (6 ft 8 in)	110 kg (240 lb)	(Hungary) Eger
13	Dávid Bisztritsányi	7 June 1987	Goalkeeper	R	187 cm (6 ft 2 in)	85 kg (187 lb)	(Hungary) OSC
Head coach: Tibor Benedek

=== Greece ===
No.	Name	Date of birth	Position	L/R	Height	Weight	Club
1	Konstantinos Flegkas	17 July 1988	Goalkeeper	R	193 cm (6 ft 4 in)	87 kg (192 lb)	(Greece) Ydraikos
2	Emmanouil Mylonakis	9 April 1985	Wing	R	185 cm (6 ft 1 in)	86 kg (190 lb)	(Greece) Olympiacos
3	Georgios Dervisis	30 October 1994	Point	R	195 cm (6 ft 5 in)	95 kg (209 lb)	(Greece) Olympiacos
4	Konstantinos Genidounias	3 May 1993	Driver	R	182 cm (6 ft 0 in)	90 kg (200 lb)	(Greece) Olympiacos
5	Ioannis Fountoulis	26 May 1988	Wing	R	186 cm (6 ft 1 in)	88 kg (194 lb)	(Greece) Olympiacos
6	Kyriakos Pontikeas	9 May 1991	Point	R	190 cm (6 ft 3 in)	84 kg (185 lb)	(Greece) Olympiacos
7	Christos Afroudakis (c)	23 May 1984	Driver	R	188 cm (6 ft 2 in)	88 kg (194 lb)	(Greece) Vouliagmeni
8	Evangelos Delakas	8 February 1985	Point	R	189 cm (6 ft 2 in)	89 kg (196 lb)	(Greece) Olympiacos
9	Konstantinos Mourikis	11 July 1988	Centre forward	R	197 cm (6 ft 6 in)	110 kg (240 lb)	(Greece) Olympiacos
10	Christodoulos Kolomvos	26 October 1988	Centre forward	R	186 cm (6 ft 1 in)	102 kg (225 lb)	(Greece) Olympiacos
11	Alexandros Gounas	3 October 1989	Driver	R	179 cm (5 ft 10 in)	74 kg (163 lb)	(Greece) Olympiacos
12	Angelos Vlachopoulos	28 September 1991	Point	R	180 cm (5 ft 11 in)	75 kg (165 lb)	(Greece) Olympiacos
13	Stefanos Galanopoulos	21 February 1993	Goalkeeper	R	197 cm (6 ft 6 in)	89 kg (196 lb)	(Greece) Olympiacos
Head coach: Thodoris Vlachos

=== Russia ===
No.	Name	Date of birth	Position	L/R	Height	Weight	Club
1	Anton Antonov	1 June 1983	Goalkeeper		195 cm (6 ft 5 in)	100 kg (220 lb)	(Russia) Dinamo Astrakhan
2	Lev Magomaev	1 February 1989			186 cm (6 ft 1 in)	98 kg (216 lb)	(Russia) Dynamo Moscow
3	Artem Odintsov	16 February 1988			195 cm (6 ft 5 in)	106 kg (234 lb)	(Russia) Sintez Kazan
4	Igor Bychkov	21 January 1994			189 cm (6 ft 2 in)	105 kg (231 lb)	(Russia) Spartak Volgograd
5	Alexey Bugaychuk	30 March 1989			184 cm (6 ft 0 in)	93 kg (205 lb)	(Russia) Dynamo Moscow
6	Mikhail Krasnov	17 June 1991			189 cm (6 ft 2 in)	90 kg (200 lb)	(Russia) Dinamo Astrakhan
7	Daniil Merkulov	3 March 1997			190 cm (6 ft 3 in)	90 kg (200 lb)	(Russia) Kinef Kirishi
8	Andrey Balakirev	31 March 1996		R	186 cm (6 ft 1 in)	90 kg (200 lb)	(Russia) Dynamo Moscow
9	Kirill Nikolaenko	19 July 1989			178 cm (5 ft 10 in)	80 kg (180 lb)	(Russia) Kinef Kirishi
10	Dmitrii Kholod (c)	16 January 1992			197 cm (6 ft 6 in)	103 kg (227 lb)	(Russia) Dynamo Moscow
11	Sergey Lisunov	12 October 1986			195 cm (6 ft 5 in)	113 kg (249 lb)	(Russia) Spartak Volgograd
12	Adel Giniiatov	22 January 1996			186 cm (6 ft 1 in)	80 kg (180 lb)	(Russia) Shturm Ruza
13	Kirill Korneev	29 September 1994	Goalkeeper		184 cm (6 ft 0 in)	88 kg (194 lb)	(Russia) Dinamo Astrakhan
Head coach: Erkin Shagaev

=== Turkey ===
No.	Name	Date of birth	Position	L/R	Height	Weight	Club
1	Atilla Sezer	13 September 1975	Goalkeeper	R	199 cm (6 ft 6 in)	109 kg (240 lb)	(Turkey) Enkaspor
2	Mahir Agkurt	7 April 1995	Centre forward	R	181 cm (5 ft 11 in)	87 kg (192 lb)	(Turkey) Adanlar
3	Srđan Aksentijević	31 January 1986	Wing	R	186 cm (6 ft 1 in)	83 kg (183 lb)	(Georgia (country)) Lokomotiv Tbilisi
4	Oytun Okman	1 August 1982	Driver	R	192 cm (6 ft 4 in)	96 kg (212 lb)	(Turkey) Manisa
5	Arslan Sutalo	27 May 1990	Driver	R	192 cm (6 ft 4 in)	112 kg (247 lb)	(Turkey) İstanbul YİK
6	Osman Selim Gulenç	7 July 1992	Point	R	196 cm (6 ft 5 in)	99 kg (218 lb)	(Turkey) Galatasaray
7	Cemil Bahadır Özbakış	25 May 1996	Driver	L	191 cm (6 ft 3 in)	90 kg (200 lb)	
8	Nadir Sönmez	29 October 1992	Driver	R	184 cm (6 ft 0 in)	86 kg (190 lb)	(Turkey) Heybeliada
9	Ali Can Yılmaz	10 June 1989	Point	R	188 cm (6 ft 2 in)	91 kg (201 lb)	(Turkey) Heybeliada
10	Mihajlo Korolija	17 April 1980	Point	R	201 cm (6 ft 7 in)	116 kg (256 lb)	
11	Halil Beşkardeşler	16 June 1983	Centre forward	R	189 cm (6 ft 2 in)	106 kg (234 lb)	
12	Alican Çağatay (c)	15 October 1990	Wing	R	190 cm (6 ft 3 in)	91 kg (201 lb)	(Turkey) Manisa
13	Deniz Şen	13 August 1980	Goalkeeper	R	195 cm (6 ft 5 in)	119 kg (262 lb)	(Turkey) Adanlar
Head coach: Mehmet Alp Olcaytu

== Statistics ==
=== Player representation by club ===
Clubs with 8 or more players represented are listed.

Club	Players
(Italy) Pro Recco	14
(Greece) Olympiacos	13
(Spain) Barceloneta	9
(Hungary) Szolnok	8

=== Coaches representation by country ===
Coaches in bold represent their own country.

Nº	Country	Coaches
2	Montenegro	**Vladimir Gojković**, Jovan Popović (Georgia)
2	Serbia	**Dejan Savić**, Dejan Stanojević (Romania)
2	Spain	Antonio Esteller (Slovakia), **Gabriel Hernández**
1	Croatia	**Ivica Tucak**
1	France	**Florian Bruzzo**
1	Germany	**Patrick Weissinger**
1	Greece	**Thodoris Vlachos**
1	Hungary	**Tibor Benedek**
1	Italy	**Alessandro Campagna**
1	Malta	**Karl Izzo**
1	Netherlands	**Robin van Galen**
1	Russia	**Erkin Shagaev**
1	Turkey	**Mehmet Alp Olcaytu**
