= Dražen Petrović Award =

Dražen Petrović Award (Croatian: Nagrada Dražen Petrović) is an award established in 2006 by the Croatian Olympic Committee. Awarded to talented young athletes and teams for outstanding sporting results and sports development. The award was named after Dražen Petrović.

== Recipients ==
Year	Female Athlete	Male Athlete	Female Team	Male Team	Female Promise	Male Promise
2007	Danijela Grgić	Filip Grgić	Junior volleyball team: Ana Grbac Danijela Anđelić Ivana Kalebić Paola Došen Jelena Alajbeg Danica Uljević Ines Medved Simona Ušić Tara Vekić Marina Ljubičić Magda Petković Matea Ikić	Junior handball team: Ivan Pešić Ante Granić Mario Gagulić Stipe Borovac Domagoj Duvnjak Manuel Štrlek Marko Tarabochia Igor Karačić Marko Matić Ivan Sever Josip Crnić Goran Bogunović Hrvoje Tojčić Josip Ilić Ivan Škegro Dinko Vuleta Luka Raković	—N/a	—N/a
2008	Martina Zubčić	Marin Premeru	Junior karate team: Ema Aničić Azra Saleš Maša Martinović Ivana Goricaj	Junior basketball team: Ivan Batur Mario Delaš Goran Fodor Toni Prostran Leon Radošević Ivan Ramljak Robert Rikić Sven Smajlagić Tomislav Zubčić Josip Bilinovac Darko Planinić Nikola Došen	—N/a	—N/a
2009	Sandra Perković	Dino Mansour	Junior bowling team: Nika Cvitković Jasmina Dubić Maja Nanić Saša Pavlović Matea Skupnjak Tihana Čavlović	Junior handball team: Josip Pivac Alen Grd Ante Vukas Damir Vučko Lovro Šprem Krešimir Ladinski Luka Sokolić Ivan Belfinger Luka Stepančić Nikola Špelić Slaven Brdar Dario Černeka Krešimir Kozina Vedran Hud Robert Markotić Marino Marić Ivan Slišković	—N/a	—N/a
2010	Barbara Matić	Filip Hrgović	Cadet basketball team: Ana-Marija Begić Lana Pačkovski Inja Butina Ivana Tikvić Ružica Džankić Antonija Chiabov Iva Cigić Andrijana Cvitković Anja Majstorović Dana Šarić Lucija Martinović Karmen Čičić	Cadet basketball team: Mislav Brzoja Martin Junaković Karlo Lebo Ivan Jukić Dario Šarić Dino Šamanić Dominik Mavra Antonio Črnjević Tomislav Radoš Nikola Urli Daniel Zovko Filip Bundović	—N/a	—N/a
2011	Lea Rakovac	Mihael Vukić	Junior table tennis team: Mateja Jeger Petra Petek Ivana Tubikanec	Cadet basketball team: Lovre Bašić Ivan Jukić Paolo Marinelli Domagoj Bošnjak Mario Hezonja Bruno Žganec Dorian Jelenek Tomislav Gabrić Leon Tomić Marko Arapović Ivan Bender Karlo Žganec	—N/a	—N/a
2012	Mateja Kunović	Ivan Horvat	Junior table tennis team: Lea Rakovac Mateja Jeger Ivana Tubikanec Ida Jazbec	Junior basketball team: Marko Proleta Tomislav Gabrić Karlo Lebo Jakov Mustapić Lovro Demo Dario Šarić Mislav Brzoja Dominik Mavra Antonio Črnjević Daniel Zovko Marin Marić Karlo Žganec	Brigita Matić	Ante Krišto
2013	Ana Konjuh	Matija Gregurić	Junior bowling team: Klara Sedlar Mirna Bosak Milana Pavlić Ana Jambrović Valentina Pavlaković Helena Bolić	Junior water polo team: Ivan Marcelić Luka Bukić Marko Macan Antun Goreta Loren Fatović Marino Čagalj Andrija Bašić Antonio Buha Ante Visković Ivan Živković Ante Vukičević Luka Lozina Andro Gagulić	Ana Konjuh	Dominik Perković
2014	Ivana Babić	Martin Marković	Junior judo team: Beata Guszak Tena Šikić Ana Kokeza Maja Blagojević Barbara Matić Brigita Matić Ivana Šutalo	Junior basketball team: Roko Badžim Ivan Majcunić Ivan Vučić Borna Kapusta Josip Jukić Goran Filipović Luka Božić Lovro Mazalin Nik Slavica Marko Arapović Dragan Bender Ante Toni Žižić	Ida Štimac	Nikola Obrovac
2015	Valentina Gustin	Borna Ćorić	Cadet judo team: Karla Prodan Tihea Topolovec Lara Kliba Dora Bortas Matea Brletić Lucija Babić Iva Oberan Lea Gobec	Junior basketball team: Ante Toni Žižić Roko Badžim Ivan Majcunić Marko Arapović Borna Kapusta Nik Slavica Ivica Zubac Ivan Karačić Goran Filipović Luka Božić Ivan Vraneš	Lana Zbašnik	Duje Ajduković
2016	Brigita Matić	Istok Rodeš	Cadet judo team: Matea Brletić Lara Cvjetko Iva Oberan Lara Kliba Lucija Babić Anđela Violić Helena Vuković Lorena Štengl Matea Behin	Cadet handball team: Ivan Panjan Mateo Radočaj Leon Strbad Tomislav Špruk Filip Turčić Dario Raguž Adrian Miličević Nikola Grahovac Halil Jaganjac Josip Šarac Daniel Vusić Tin Lučin Ivan Koncul Vito Bahtijarević Ivan Martinović Filip Curiš Ivan Ereš Anthony Jurman	Jelena Pehar	Luka Štrbenac
2017	Helena Vuković	Miran Maričić	Cadet bowling team: Tea Dragičević Matea Juričić Tamara Sinković Vanesa Bogdanović Ivana Neralić	Cadet waterpolo team: Luka Podrug Ivan Krolo Karlo Kreković Marko Valečić Zvonimir Butić Jacob Merčep Duje Pejković Franko Lazić Lovro Paparić Matias Biljaka Petar Bratim Branimir Herceg Luka Bajić	Lea Vukoja	Paško Božić
2018	Nika Klepac	Marino Bloudek	Not awarded	Cadet basketball team: Matej Bošnjak Ivan Perasović Roko Prkačin Filip Paponja Boris Tišma Lukša Buljević Hrvoje Majcunić Ante Perkušić Dominik Rašić Tomislav Ivišić Duje Brala Mario Krešić	Ana Viktorija Puljiz	Mili Poljičak
2019	Ana Viktorija Puljiz	Franko Grgić	Junior beach handball team: Mia Bošnjak Ana Malec Petra Lovrenčević Saša Sladić Mia Tupek Rea Banić Nika Vojnović Anja Vida Lukšić Vanja Perenčević	Cadet handball team: Matija Car Ivan Barbić Mislav Trninić Mislav Obradović Rok Malin David Štrković Jakov Neralić Adam Šalić Matej Mandić Marin Lisac Matej Svržnjak Dominik Kuzmanović Fabijan Grubišić Zlatko Raužan Mario Zakić	Antonia Ružić	Franko Grgić
2020	Nika Petanjek	Renato Rešetar	Junior karate team: Stela Horvat Inga Grgić Sabina Petković	Not awarded	Zrinka Ljutić	Dino Prižmić
2021	Lara Cvjetko	Josip Teskera	Junior bowling team: Magdalena Škreblin Sara Pejak Anamarija Grdić Amela Nicol Imširović Paula Polanščak	Cadet handball team: Dominik Kuzmanović Ivan Barbić Matija Car Adam Šalić Fabijan Grubišić Marin Lisac David Jurišić Patrik Hršak Matej Mandić Marin Božičević Jakov Dujić Matej Komljenović Mario Zakić Jakov Neralić Zlatko Raužan Mislav Obradović Toma Lučin Roka Malin Tin Tompić	Tea Peteh	Duje Markovina
2022	Zrinka Ljutić	Mili Poljičak	Cadet basketball team: Petra Božan Tonka Jakšić Ella Majstorović Josipa Milković Gina Nikola Pirjak Viktoria Rogić Andrea Stanković Jelena Brkičić Zara Valčić Lena Bilić Hana Arnautović Hana Budimir	Junior beach handball team: Gabriel Botić Borna Bubalo Fran Cvjetićanin Antonio Fabek Roko Filipović Luka Glevendekić Matija Jurasović Vigo Konforta Antonio Kranjčević Josip Tomić	Jana Koščak	Matej Nevešćanin
2023	Veronika Vilk	Dino Prižmić	Cadet volleyball team: Carla Stošić Anika Kontošić Iva Ucović Gabrijela Roso Leni Ivković Ana Prkačin Maša Mlinar Lana Francetić Lorena Smojver Franka Golemac Klara Vasilj Asja Zolota Iva Lucija Caušević Antonija Gulin	Junior handball team: Tin Herceg Toni Matošević Tonči Ivanišević Gabrijel Bartolić Marko Tkalec Vito Glivetić Marko Bajan Maksimilijan Molc Aleksandar Čaprić Fran Zovak Tian Borovec Martin Tomšić Karlo Jurić Marko Prpić Petar Krupić Franko Krstić Luka Malinarich Ivan Petrović Adrian Ćosić Karlo Bjeliš	Jana Pavalić	Roko Brantuša
2024	Jana Koščak	Roko Farkaš	Junior shooting team: Lana Špirelja Anna Ćukušić Marija Maglica	Junior 3x3 basketball team: Roko Cetina Vito Mlatac Juraj Brkić Niko Bandov	Petra Uglešić	Toma Smirčić
2024	Jana Koščak	Roko Farkaš	Junior shooting team: Lana Špirelja Anna Ćukušić Marija Maglica	Junior 3x3 basketball team: Roko Cetina Vito Mlatac Juraj Brkić Niko Bandov	Vita Erceg	Lucijan Nikolić-Malora
2025	Magdalena Matić	Josip Tafra	Cadet handball team: Nika Batinić Vanessa Bebić Nika Bodrožić Mare Čuraković Ana Đolonga Helena Furčić Luna Gojak Katja Gregurić Antea Jerković Tena Jurlina Matea Koska Iva Sunčica Mastelić Eda Nikolić Vanja Špehar Rahela Varga Vanna Zdrinščak Anamarija Barić	Junior water polo team: Ivan Mauro Čubranić Jakov Ćosić Viktor Tončinić Šime Žilić Duje Katunarić Ivuša Burđelez Mauro Prkoča Amar Fajković Ante Jerković Dominik Obuljen Luka Penava Duje Cuzzi Vlaho Pavlić Gabrijel Burburan Maro Šušić Karlo Dragošević Mislav Ćurković Jan Bušić	Lorena Opačak	Luka Jakovina
2026	Vita Barbić	Oscar Kovačić	Not awarded	Junior water polo team: Nikola Batoš Marin Bajurin Dominik Beljan Mate Šorić Filip Rogić Petar Erenda Deni Sappe Mihael Mladineo Ivano Lončar Nardo Dragaš Toma Drobac Nikola Ferić Toni Galušić Nardo Skejić Duje Burazin	Katia Milić	Vito Rupčić
