= Water polo at the 2019 Summer Universiade – Men's tournament =

Water polo tournament

Men's water polo at the XXX Summer Universiade
- Venue: Stadio del Nuoto, Caserta; Piscina Felice Scandone, Naples
- Dates: 2–14 July 2019
- Teams: 10

Medalists
1st place, gold medalist(s)		Italy
2nd place, silver medalist(s)		United States
3rd place, bronze medalist(s)		Hungary

Men's water polo at the 2019 Summer Universiade was held in Caserta and Naples (Italy) from 2 to 14 July 2019.

Italy won the competition for the fourth time, defeating the United States in the gold-medal match.

== Results ==
All times are local (UTC+01:00)

=== Preliminary round ===
==== Group A ====
Team	Pts	Pld	W	D	L	GF	GA	GD
United States	12	4	4	0	0	70	22	48
Russia	9	4	3	0	1	76	21	55
France	6	4	2	0	2	49	31	18
Great Britain	3	4	1	0	3	30	66	–36
South Korea	0	4	0	0	4	15	100	–85

2 July 2019; 13:30	Match 1	Russia	25–1	Great Britain	Stadio del Nuoto (Caserta); Referees: MacKay (CAN); Ogino (JPN)
2 July 2019; 13:30	Match 1	Score by quarters: 5–0, 7–1, 7–0, 6–1			Stadio del Nuoto (Caserta); Referees: MacKay (CAN); Ogino (JPN)
2 July 2019; 13:30	Match 1	Vasilev: 6 Zinnurov: 5	Goals	Daley: 1	Stadio del Nuoto (Caserta); Referees: MacKay (CAN); Ogino (JPN)

2 July 2019; 15:30	Match 2	United States	30–0	South Korea	Stadio del Nuoto (Caserta); Referees: Marjay (HUN); Kohout (CZE)
2 July 2019; 15:30	Match 2	Score by quarters: 8–0, 8–1, 8–1, 6–1			Stadio del Nuoto (Caserta); Referees: Marjay (HUN); Kohout (CZE)
2 July 2019; 15:30	Match 2	Rossman: 6 Abramson, Williams: 5	Goals	Kang J.: 2	Stadio del Nuoto (Caserta); Referees: Marjay (HUN); Kohout (CZE)

3 July 2019; 09:30	Match 5	Great Britain	17–9	South Korea	Stadio del Nuoto (Caserta); Referees: Calabro (ITA); Kohout (CZE)
3 July 2019; 09:30	Match 5	Score by quarters: 4–1, 5–4, 5–1, 3–3			Stadio del Nuoto (Caserta); Referees: Calabro (ITA); Kohout (CZE)
3 July 2019; 09:30	Match 5	Paddon: 5 Elliot: 3	Goals	Song K., Lee C.: 2	Stadio del Nuoto (Caserta); Referees: Calabro (ITA); Kohout (CZE)

3 July 2019; 11:30	Match 6	Russia	12–4	France	Stadio del Nuoto (Caserta); Referees: Fodor (HUN); Bianco (ITA)
3 July 2019; 11:30	Match 6	Score by quarters: 3–2, 2–1, 3–0, 4–1			Stadio del Nuoto (Caserta); Referees: Fodor (HUN); Bianco (ITA)
3 July 2019; 11:30	Match 6	Bychkov: 4	Goals	4 players: 1	Stadio del Nuoto (Caserta); Referees: Fodor (HUN); Bianco (ITA)

5 July 2019; 13:30	Match 9	South Korea	0–22	France	Stadio del Nuoto (Caserta); Referees: Calabro (ITA); Ogino (JPN)
5 July 2019; 13:30	Match 9	Score by quarters: 0–5, 0–4, 0–9, 0–4			Stadio del Nuoto (Caserta); Referees: Calabro (ITA); Ogino (JPN)
5 July 2019; 13:30	Match 9		Goals	Bouet, Mustur: 4 Lepoint: 3	Stadio del Nuoto (Caserta); Referees: Calabro (ITA); Ogino (JPN)

5 July 2019; 15:30	Match 10	Great Britain	3–17	United States	Stadio del Nuoto (Caserta); Referees: Pang (CHN); MacKay (CAN)
5 July 2019; 15:30	Match 10	Score by quarters: 1–3, 1–2, 1–7, 0–5			Stadio del Nuoto (Caserta); Referees: Pang (CHN); MacKay (CAN)
5 July 2019; 15:30	Match 10	Paddon, Carpenter, Pratt: 1	Goals	Cavano: 5 Ehrhardt: 4 Abramson: 3	Stadio del Nuoto (Caserta); Referees: Pang (CHN); MacKay (CAN)

6 July 2019; 13:30	Match 13	France	8–10	United States	Stadio del Nuoto (Caserta); Referees: Calabro (ITA); Fodor (HUN)
6 July 2019; 13:30	Match 13	Score by quarters: '2–4, 4–3, 1–1, 1–2			Stadio del Nuoto (Caserta); Referees: Calabro (ITA); Fodor (HUN)
6 July 2019; 13:30	Match 13	Cannone: 5 Vitrant: 2	Goals	Ehrhardt, Williams, Langiewicz, Woodhead: 2	Stadio del Nuoto (Caserta); Referees: Calabro (ITA); Fodor (HUN)

6 July 2019; 15:30	Match 14	South Korea	3–31	Russia	Stadio del Nuoto (Caserta); Referees: Castrilli (SUI); Saito (JPN)
6 July 2019; 15:30	Match 14	Score by quarters: 0–7, 2–11, 1–5, 0–8			Stadio del Nuoto (Caserta); Referees: Castrilli (SUI); Saito (JPN)
6 July 2019; 15:30	Match 14	Jang, Song G., Lee C.: 1	Goals	Krug: 8 Gusarov: 5	Stadio del Nuoto (Caserta); Referees: Castrilli (SUI); Saito (JPN)

8 July 2019; 13:30	Match 17	United States	13–8	Russia	Stadio del Nuoto (Caserta); Referees: Fodor (HUN); Bianco (ITA)
8 July 2019; 13:30	Match 17	Score by quarters: 3–2, 5–0, 2–4, 3–2			Stadio del Nuoto (Caserta); Referees: Fodor (HUN); Bianco (ITA)
8 July 2019; 13:30	Match 17	Abramson: 4 Cavano, Rosenfeld, Williams: 2	Goals	Merkulov: 3 Vasilev, Bychkov: 2	Stadio del Nuoto (Caserta); Referees: Fodor (HUN); Bianco (ITA)

8 July 2019; 15:30	Match 18	France	15–9	Great Britain	Stadio del Nuoto (Caserta); Referees: MacKay (CAN); Kohout (CZE)
8 July 2019; 15:30	Match 18	Score by quarters: 3–1, 4–4, 4–2, 4–2			Stadio del Nuoto (Caserta); Referees: MacKay (CAN); Kohout (CZE)
8 July 2019; 15:30	Match 18	Marion-Vernoux: 4 Olivon: 3	Goals	Carpenter: 3 Pratt: 2	Stadio del Nuoto (Caserta); Referees: MacKay (CAN); Kohout (CZE)

==== Group B ====
Team	Pts	Pld	W	D	L	GF	GA	GD
Italy	12	4	4	0	0	67	38	29
Hungary	9	4	3	0	1	60	43	17
Croatia	6	4	2	0	2	61	56	5
Australia	3	4	1	0	3	35	67	–32
Japan	0	4	0	0	4	55	74	–19

2 July 2019; 17:30	Match 3	Croatia	17–9	Australia	Stadio del Nuoto (Caserta); Referees: Courbin (FRA); Peila (USA)
2 July 2019; 17:30	Match 3	Score by quarters: 5–4, 5–0, 5–1, 2–4			Stadio del Nuoto (Caserta); Referees: Courbin (FRA); Peila (USA)
2 July 2019; 17:30	Match 3	Buha: 5 Lazić, Delić: 4	Goals	Townsend: 2	Stadio del Nuoto (Caserta); Referees: Courbin (FRA); Peila (USA)

2 July 2019; 19:30	Match 4	Italy	22–11	Japan	Stadio del Nuoto (Caserta); Referees: Krizhanovskhiy (RUS); Bouchez (FRA)
2 July 2019; 19:30	Match 4	Score by quarters: 5–2, 5–2, 7–4, 5–3			Stadio del Nuoto (Caserta); Referees: Krizhanovskhiy (RUS); Bouchez (FRA)
2 July 2019; 19:30	Match 4	Cannella: 8 Panerai, Di Martire: 3	Goals	Inaba: 4 Date: 2	Stadio del Nuoto (Caserta); Referees: Krizhanovskhiy (RUS); Bouchez (FRA)

4 July 2019; 17:30	Match 7	Australia	15–14	Japan	Stadio del Nuoto (Caserta); Referees: Buch (ESP); Stankevitch (USA)
4 July 2019; 17:30	Match 7	Score by quarters: 4–5, 3–3, 4–3, 4–3			Stadio del Nuoto (Caserta); Referees: Buch (ESP); Stankevitch (USA)
4 July 2019; 17:30	Match 7	Lambie: 5 Gillfeather, Negus: 3	Goals	Inaba, Date: 5	Stadio del Nuoto (Caserta); Referees: Buch (ESP); Stankevitch (USA)

4 July 2019; 19:30	Match 8	Croatia	12–15	Hungary	Stadio del Nuoto (Caserta); Referees: Colicov (RUS); Peila (USA)
4 July 2019; 19:30	Match 8	Score by quarters: 1–4, 3–2, 5–4, 3–5			Stadio del Nuoto (Caserta); Referees: Colicov (RUS); Peila (USA)
4 July 2019; 19:30	Match 8	Buha, Delić: 4	Goals	Burián, Várnai, Gyárfás: 4	Stadio del Nuoto (Caserta); Referees: Colicov (RUS); Peila (USA)

5 July 2019; 17:30	Match 11	Japan	12–18	Hungary	Stadio del Nuoto (Caserta); Referees: Buch (ESP); Dalli (MLT)
5 July 2019; 17:30	Match 11	Score by quarters: 4–7, 3–2, 2–6, 3–3			Stadio del Nuoto (Caserta); Referees: Buch (ESP); Dalli (MLT)
5 July 2019; 17:30	Match 11	Date: 4 Kageta: 3	Goals	Gyárfás: 4 Fejős: 3	Stadio del Nuoto (Caserta); Referees: Buch (ESP); Dalli (MLT)

5 July 2019; 19:30	Match 12	Australia	5–18	Italy	Stadio del Nuoto (Caserta); Referees: Colikov (RUS); Corbin (FRA)
5 July 2019; 19:30	Match 12	Score by quarters: 0–4, 1–5, 2–6, 2–3			Stadio del Nuoto (Caserta); Referees: Colikov (RUS); Corbin (FRA)
5 July 2019; 19:30	Match 12	Elphick: 2	Goals	Cannella: 4 Campopiano, Bruni, Alesiani: 3	Stadio del Nuoto (Caserta); Referees: Colikov (RUS); Corbin (FRA)

6 July 2019; 17:30	Match 15	Japan	18–19	Croatia	Stadio del Nuoto (Caserta); Referees: Corbin (FRA); Krizhakovskiy (RUS)
6 July 2019; 17:30	Match 15	Score by quarters: 2–4, 8–5, 2–6, 6–4			Stadio del Nuoto (Caserta); Referees: Corbin (FRA); Krizhakovskiy (RUS)
6 July 2019; 17:30	Match 15	Suzuki: 5 Inaba: 4	Goals	Herceg: 5 Lazić, Butić, Delić: 3	Stadio del Nuoto (Caserta); Referees: Corbin (FRA); Krizhakovskiy (RUS)

6 July 2019; 19:30	Match 16	Hungary	10–13	Italy	Stadio del Nuoto (Caserta); Referees: Peila (USA); Matache (ROU)
6 July 2019; 19:30	Match 16	Score by quarters: 2–3, 2–2, 4–5, 2–3			Stadio del Nuoto (Caserta); Referees: Peila (USA); Matache (ROU)
6 July 2019; 19:30	Match 16	Gyárfás: 3 Burián: 2	Goals	Di Martire: 4 Cannella: 3	Stadio del Nuoto (Caserta); Referees: Peila (USA); Matache (ROU)

8 July 2019; 17:30	Match 19	Hungary	18–6	Australia	Stadio del Nuoto (Caserta); Referees: Castrilli (SUI); Bouchez (FRA)
8 July 2019; 17:30	Match 19	Score by quarters: 5–1, 2–1, 6–3, 5–1			Stadio del Nuoto (Caserta); Referees: Castrilli (SUI); Bouchez (FRA)
8 July 2019; 17:30	Match 19	Gyárfás: 6 Csacsovszky: 3	Goals	Elphick: 2	Stadio del Nuoto (Caserta); Referees: Castrilli (SUI); Bouchez (FRA)

8 July 2019; 19:30	Match 20	Italy	14–13	Croatia	Stadio del Nuoto (Caserta); Referees: Buch (ESP); Golikov (RUS)
8 July 2019; 19:30	Match 20	Score by quarters: 4–3, 4–3, 3–1, 3–6			Stadio del Nuoto (Caserta); Referees: Buch (ESP); Golikov (RUS)
8 July 2019; 19:30	Match 20	Cannella: 5 Del Basso: 3	Goals	Delić: 5 Buha: 3	Stadio del Nuoto (Caserta); Referees: Buch (ESP); Golikov (RUS)

=== Knock-out stage ===
==== Brackets ====
- Main bracket

Round of 16
B4	Australia	21
A5	South Korea	4
A4	Great Britain	10
B5	Japan	18

Quarter-finals
B1	Italy	15
A3	France	9
A2	Russia	13
B4	Australia	7
A1	United States	12
B3	Croatia	11
B2	Hungary	18
B5	Japan	3

Semifinals
B1	Italy	14
A2	Russia	6
A1	United States	12
B2	Hungary	9

Gold Medal final
B1	Italy	18
A1	United States	7
Bronze Medal final
A2	Russia	22
B2	Hungary (p)	23

- 5th to 8th place blacket

Semifinals
France	7
Australia	3
Croatia	16
Japan	17

5th place Final
France	9
Japan	17
7th place Final
Australia	4
Croatia	12

==== Round of 16 ====
9 July 2019; 17:30	Match 21	Great Britain	10–18	Japan	Stadio del Nuoto (Caserta); Referees: Pang (CHN); Corbin (FRA)
9 July 2019; 17:30	Match 21	Score by quarters: 2–9, 4–3, 0–2, 4–4			Stadio del Nuoto (Caserta); Referees: Pang (CHN); Corbin (FRA)
9 July 2019; 17:30	Match 21	Paddon: 5	Goals	Date: 8 Inaba: 3	Stadio del Nuoto (Caserta); Referees: Pang (CHN); Corbin (FRA)

9 July 2019; 19:30	Match 22	Australia	21–4	South Korea	Stadio del Nuoto (Caserta); Referees: Jukes (GBR); Ogino (JPN)
9 July 2019; 19:30	Match 22	Score by quarters: 4–2, 7–1, 5–0, 5–1			Stadio del Nuoto (Caserta); Referees: Jukes (GBR); Ogino (JPN)
9 July 2019; 19:30	Match 22	Gillfeather: 4 Lambie, Elphick, Nangle: 3	Goals	Kang M.: 2	Stadio del Nuoto (Caserta); Referees: Jukes (GBR); Ogino (JPN)

==== Quarter-finals ====
10 July 2019; 13:30	Match 24	Russia	13–7	Australia	Stadio del Nuoto (Caserta); Referees: Calabro (ITA); Ogino (JPN)
10 July 2019; 13:30	Match 24	Score by quarters: 5–0, 1–4, 4–2, 3–1			Stadio del Nuoto (Caserta); Referees: Calabro (ITA); Ogino (JPN)
10 July 2019; 13:30	Match 24	Merkulov, Bychkov, Zinnurov: 3	Goals	Townsend: 3	Stadio del Nuoto (Caserta); Referees: Calabro (ITA); Ogino (JPN)

10 July 2019; 15:30	Match 25	United States	12–11	Croatia	Stadio del Nuoto (Caserta); Referees: Buch (ESP); Marjay (HUN)
10 July 2019; 15:30	Match 25	Score by quarters: 4–3, 3–3, 1–3, 4–2			Stadio del Nuoto (Caserta); Referees: Buch (ESP); Marjay (HUN)
10 July 2019; 15:30	Match 25	Abramson: 5 Ehrhardt, Williams: 3	Goals	Herceg, Butić; Buha, Rakovac: 2	Stadio del Nuoto (Caserta); Referees: Buch (ESP); Marjay (HUN)

10 July 2019; 17:30	Match 26	Hungary	18–3	Japan	Stadio del Nuoto (Caserta); Referees: MacKay (CAN); Pang (CHN)
10 July 2019; 17:30	Match 26	Score by quarters: 6–3, 2–0, 5–0, 5–0			Stadio del Nuoto (Caserta); Referees: MacKay (CAN); Pang (CHN)
10 July 2019; 17:30	Match 26	Várnai: 4; 6 players: 2	Goals	Inaba, Date, Suzuki: 1	Stadio del Nuoto (Caserta); Referees: MacKay (CAN); Pang (CHN)

10 July 2019; 19:30	Match 23	Italy	15–9	France	Stadio del Nuoto (Caserta); Referees: Peila (USA); Castrilli (SUI)
10 July 2019; 19:30	Match 23	Score by quarters: 5–3, 4–3, 4–1, 2–2			Stadio del Nuoto (Caserta); Referees: Peila (USA); Castrilli (SUI)
10 July 2019; 19:30	Match 23	Cannella: 4 Alesiani, Di Martire: 3	Goals	Olivon, Vitrant, Marion-Vernoux: 2	Stadio del Nuoto (Caserta); Referees: Peila (USA); Castrilli (SUI)

==== Semifinals ====
13 July 2019; 12:00	Match 32	Italy	14–6	Russia	Piscina Felice Scandone (Naples); Referees: Buch (ESP); Matache (ROU)
13 July 2019; 12:00	Match 32	Score by quarters: 4–1, 3–2, 3–0, 4–3			Piscina Felice Scandone (Naples); Referees: Buch (ESP); Matache (ROU)
13 July 2019; 12:00	Match 32	Cannella: 4 Alesiani: 3	Goals	Bychkov: 3 Merkulov: 2	Piscina Felice Scandone (Naples); Referees: Buch (ESP); Matache (ROU)

13 July 2019; 14:00	Match 33	United States	12–9	Hungary	Piscina Felice Scandone (Naples); Referees: Dalli (MLT); Calabro (ITA)
13 July 2019; 14:00	Match 33	Score by quarters: 2–4, 3–3, 3–1, 4–1			Piscina Felice Scandone (Naples); Referees: Dalli (MLT); Calabro (ITA)
13 July 2019; 14:00	Match 33	Cavano, Woodhead: 3 Ehrhardt, Langiewicz: 2	Goals	Burián: 5 Gyárfás: 2	Piscina Felice Scandone (Naples); Referees: Dalli (MLT); Calabro (ITA)

- 5th to 8th place

11 July 2019; 17:30	Match 27	France	7–3	Australia	Stadio del Nuoto (Caserta); Referees: Colikov (RUS); Stankevitch (USA)
11 July 2019; 17:30	Match 27	Score by quarters: 2–2, 1–1, 2–0, 2–0			Stadio del Nuoto (Caserta); Referees: Colikov (RUS); Stankevitch (USA)
11 July 2019; 17:30	Match 27	7 players: 1	Goals	Lambie, Negus, Townsend: 1	Stadio del Nuoto (Caserta); Referees: Colikov (RUS); Stankevitch (USA)

11 July 2019; 19:30	Match 28	Croatia	16–17	Japan	Stadio del Nuoto (Caserta); Referees: MacKay (CAN); Corbin (FRA)
11 July 2019; 19:30	Match 28	Score by quarters: 3–7, 5–4, 4–4, 4–2			Stadio del Nuoto (Caserta); Referees: MacKay (CAN); Corbin (FRA)
11 July 2019; 19:30	Match 28	Buha: 4 Delić: 3	Goals	Date: 6 Inaba: 5	Stadio del Nuoto (Caserta); Referees: MacKay (CAN); Corbin (FRA)

==== Finals ====
- 9th/10th place match

11 July 2019; 15:30	Match 29	South Korea	7–15	Great Britain	Stadio del Nuoto (Caserta); Referees: Kohout (CZE); Krizhanovskiy (RUS)
11 July 2019; 15:30	Match 29	Score by quarters: 0–6, 1–3, 3–4, 3–2			Stadio del Nuoto (Caserta); Referees: Kohout (CZE); Krizhanovskiy (RUS)
11 July 2019; 15:30	Match 29	Kang J.: 3 Song G., Song K.: 2	Goals	Elliot: 3; 4 players: 2	Stadio del Nuoto (Caserta); Referees: Kohout (CZE); Krizhanovskiy (RUS)

- 7th/8th place match

12 July 2019; 17:30	Match 30	Australia	4–12	Croatia	Stadio del Nuoto (Caserta); Referees: Peila (USA); Castrilli (SUI)
12 July 2019; 17:30	Match 30	Score by quarters: 1–3, 1–3, 0–4, 2–2			Stadio del Nuoto (Caserta); Referees: Peila (USA); Castrilli (SUI)
12 July 2019; 17:30	Match 30	4 players: 1	Goals	Pejković, Delić: 3 Biljaka: 2	Stadio del Nuoto (Caserta); Referees: Peila (USA); Castrilli (SUI)

- 5th/6th place match

12 July 2019; 19:30	Match 31	France	9–17	Japan	Stadio del Nuoto (Caserta); Referees: Marjay (HUN); Bianco (ITA)
12 July 2019; 19:30	Match 31	Score by quarters: 2–5, 4–4, 2–4, 1–4			Stadio del Nuoto (Caserta); Referees: Marjay (HUN); Bianco (ITA)
12 July 2019; 19:30	Match 31	Cannone: 4 Marion-Vernoux: 2	Goals	Date: 6 Inaba: 3	Stadio del Nuoto (Caserta); Referees: Marjay (HUN); Bianco (ITA)

- Bronze medal match

14 July 2019; 11:00	Match 34	Russia	22–23 (p) (PSO)	Hungary	Piscina Felice Scandone (Naples); Referees: Peila (USA); Matache (ROU)
14 July 2019; 11:00	Match 34	Score by quarters: 1–3, 4–2, 2–0, 3–5 PSO: 12-13			Piscina Felice Scandone (Naples); Referees: Peila (USA); Matache (ROU)
14 July 2019; 11:00	Match 34	Merkulov: 4 Stuchkov, Bychkov: 2	Goals	Burián: 4 Gyárfás: 3	Piscina Felice Scandone (Naples); Referees: Peila (USA); Matache (ROU)

- Gold medal match

14 July 2019; 13:00	Match 35	Italy	18–7	United States	Piscina Felice Scandone (Naples); Referees: Buch (ESP); Dalli (MLT)
14 July 2019; 13:00	Match 35	Score by quarters: 4–1, 3–2, 3–1, 8–3			Piscina Felice Scandone (Naples); Referees: Buch (ESP); Dalli (MLT)
14 July 2019; 13:00	Match 35	Campopiano: 4 Cannella: 3	Goals	Abramson, Cavano, Woodhead: 2	Piscina Felice Scandone (Naples); Referees: Buch (ESP); Dalli (MLT)

== Final standing ==
Rank	Team
1st place, gold medalist(s)	Italy
2nd place, silver medalist(s)	United States
3rd place, bronze medalist(s)	Hungary
4	Russia
5	Japan
6	France
7	Croatia
8	Australia
9	Great Britain
10	South Korea

== Top scorers ==
Overall standing

Rank	Player	Goals
1	(Japan) Kiyomu Date	33
2	(Italy) Giacomo Cannella	31
3	(Japan) Kohei Inaba	27
4	(Hungary) Tamás Gyárfás	24
5	(Croatia) Marin Delić	22
6	(United States) Tyler Abramson	20
6	(Croatia) Antonio Buha	20
6	(Russia) Daniil Merkulov	20
9	(Hungary) Gergely Burián	19
10	(Russia) Igor Bychkov	18
