= Weissinger =

Weissinger is a surname of German origin. Notable people with the name include:

- George Weissinger Smith (1864–1931), Mayor of Louisville, Kentucky (United States) from 1917 to 1921
- Patrick Weissinger (born 1973), German polo player and coach
- René Weissinger (born 1978), German cyclist
