= Esteller =

Esteller is a surname. Notable people with the surname include:

- Antonio Esteller (born 1955), Spanish water polo player
- Eduard Carbonell i Esteller (1946–2025), Spanish art historian
- Manel Esteller (born 1968), Spanish molecular geneticist
