= Water polo at the 2015 Summer Universiade – Men's tournament =

Water polo at the XXVIII Summer Universiade

Medalists
1st place, gold medalist(s)		Hungary
2nd place, silver medalist(s)		Italy
3rd place, bronze medalist(s)		United States

Men's water polo at the 2015 Summer Universiade was held in Yeomju Indoor Aquatics Center, Gwangju, Korea from 2–14 July 2015.

== Results ==
All times are Korea Standard Time (UTC+09:00)

=== Preliminary round ===
==== Group A ====
Team	Pld	W	D	L	GF	GA	GD	Pts
Hungary	6	5	1	0	67	36	+31	11
Australia	6	4	1	1	62	39	+23	9
France	6	4	0	2	64	62	+2	8
Italy	6	3	0	3	66	49	+17	6
Netherlands	6	3	0	3	77	53	+24	6
Brazil	6	1	0	5	41	78	-37	2
South Korea	6	0	0	6	31	91	-60	0

2 July; 12:30	Report	Italy	8–10	Hungary	Yeomju Indoor Aquatics Center, Gwangju; Referees: Dragan Stampalija (CRO); Joseph Peila (USA)
2 July; 12:30	Report	Score by quarters: 1–4, 2–2, 3–2, 2–2			Yeomju Indoor Aquatics Center, Gwangju; Referees: Dragan Stampalija (CRO); Joseph Peila (USA)
2 July; 12:30	Report	Mirarchi, Damonte 2	Goals	Bátori 4	Yeomju Indoor Aquatics Center, Gwangju; Referees: Dragan Stampalija (CRO); Joseph Peila (USA)

2 July; 14:00	Report	France	10–9	Netherlands	Yeomju Indoor Aquatics Center, Gwangju; Referees: Nikolaos Boudramis (GRE); Irfan Sadekov (RUS)
2 July; 14:00	Report	Score by quarters: 3–1, 2–2, 3–2, 2–4			Yeomju Indoor Aquatics Center, Gwangju; Referees: Nikolaos Boudramis (GRE); Irfan Sadekov (RUS)
2 July; 14:00	Report	Izdinsky 3	Goals	four players 2	Yeomju Indoor Aquatics Center, Gwangju; Referees: Nikolaos Boudramis (GRE); Irfan Sadekov (RUS)

2 July; 20:00	Report	Australia	14–3	South Korea	Yeomju Indoor Aquatics Center, Gwangju; Referees: Yosuke Kajiwara (JPN); Ivanka Rakovic Krstonosic (SRB)
2 July; 20:00	Report	Score by quarters: 4–1, 3–0, 3–2, 4–0			Yeomju Indoor Aquatics Center, Gwangju; Referees: Yosuke Kajiwara (JPN); Ivanka Rakovic Krstonosic (SRB)
2 July; 20:00	Report	Edwards 5	Goals	three players 2	Yeomju Indoor Aquatics Center, Gwangju; Referees: Yosuke Kajiwara (JPN); Ivanka Rakovic Krstonosic (SRB)

4 July; 17:00	Report	Netherlands	18–6	Brazil	Yeomju Indoor Aquatics Center, Gwangju; Referees: Zhang Liang (CHN); Yosuke Kjiwara (JPN)
4 July; 17:00	Report	Score by quarters: 5–2, 5–1, 2–1, 6–2			Yeomju Indoor Aquatics Center, Gwangju; Referees: Zhang Liang (CHN); Yosuke Kjiwara (JPN)
4 July; 17:00	Report	Winkelhorst 5	Goals	Vergara 3	Yeomju Indoor Aquatics Center, Gwangju; Referees: Zhang Liang (CHN); Yosuke Kjiwara (JPN)

4 July; 18:30	Report	Hungary	8–8	Australia	Yeomju Indoor Aquatics Center, Gwangju; Referees: Vladimir Gerzanich (RUS); Joseph Peila (USA)
4 July; 18:30	Report	Score by quarters: 4–3, 1–2, 2–0, 1–3			Yeomju Indoor Aquatics Center, Gwangju; Referees: Vladimir Gerzanich (RUS); Joseph Peila (USA)
4 July; 18:30	Report	Bátori 2	Goals	three players 2	Yeomju Indoor Aquatics Center, Gwangju; Referees: Vladimir Gerzanich (RUS); Joseph Peila (USA)

4 July; 20:00	Report	South Korea	9–14	France	Yeomju Indoor Aquatics Center, Gwangju; Referees: Chen Ziliang (CHN) Hiroaki Ogino (JPN)
4 July; 20:00	Report	Score by quarters: 2–4, 2–3, 3–3, 2–4			Yeomju Indoor Aquatics Center, Gwangju; Referees: Chen Ziliang (CHN) Hiroaki Ogino (JPN)
4 July; 20:00	Report	Youn 3	Goals	Cammarasa 5	Yeomju Indoor Aquatics Center, Gwangju; Referees: Chen Ziliang (CHN) Hiroaki Ogino (JPN)

5 July; 15:30	Report	Brazil	10–14	France	Yeomju Indoor Aquatics Center, Gwangju; Referees: Zhang Liang (CHN); Ivanka Rakovic Krstonosic (SRB)
5 July; 15:30	Report	Score by quarters: 4–4, 2–4, 2–4, 2–2			Yeomju Indoor Aquatics Center, Gwangju; Referees: Zhang Liang (CHN); Ivanka Rakovic Krstonosic (SRB)
5 July; 15:30	Report	Mendonca 4	Goals	Cammarasa 6	Yeomju Indoor Aquatics Center, Gwangju; Referees: Zhang Liang (CHN); Ivanka Rakovic Krstonosic (SRB)

5 July; 17:00	Report	Netherlands	9–8	Australia	Yeomju Indoor Aquatics Center, Gwangju; Referees: Vladimir Gerzanich (RUS); Yosuke Kajiwara (JPN)
5 July; 17:00	Report	Score by quarters: 2–2, 2–2, 5–3, 0–1			Yeomju Indoor Aquatics Center, Gwangju; Referees: Vladimir Gerzanich (RUS); Yosuke Kajiwara (JPN)
5 July; 17:00	Report	Lindhout 4	Goals	Edwards 3	Yeomju Indoor Aquatics Center, Gwangju; Referees: Vladimir Gerzanich (RUS); Yosuke Kajiwara (JPN)

5 July; 18:30	Report	South Korea	5–13	Italy	Yeomju Indoor Aquatics Center, Gwangju; Referees: Nikolaos Boudramis (GRE); Haldun Toygarli (TUR)
5 July; 18:30	Report	Score by quarters: 2–3, 1–4, 1–3, 1–3			Yeomju Indoor Aquatics Center, Gwangju; Referees: Nikolaos Boudramis (GRE); Haldun Toygarli (TUR)
5 July; 18:30	Report	Youn 2	Goals	four players 2	Yeomju Indoor Aquatics Center, Gwangju; Referees: Nikolaos Boudramis (GRE); Haldun Toygarli (TUR)

6 July; 17:00	Report	France	9–14	Australia	Yeomju Indoor Aquatics Center, Gwangju; Referees: Dario Blazevic (SRB); Joseph Peila (USA)
6 July; 17:00	Report	Score by quarters: 4-4, 1-3, 3-4, 1-3			Yeomju Indoor Aquatics Center, Gwangju; Referees: Dario Blazevic (SRB); Joseph Peila (USA)
6 July; 17:00	Report	Sindone 4	Goals	Camarasa 3	Yeomju Indoor Aquatics Center, Gwangju; Referees: Dario Blazevic (SRB); Joseph Peila (USA)

6 July; 18:30	Report	Brazil	7–16	Italy	Yeomju Indoor Aquatics Center, Gwangju; Referees: Ziliang Chen (CHN); Ogino Hiroaki (JPN)
6 July; 18:30	Report	Score by quarters: 3–3, 1–4, 2–5, 1–4			Yeomju Indoor Aquatics Center, Gwangju; Referees: Ziliang Chen (CHN); Ogino Hiroaki (JPN)
6 July; 18:30	Report	Mendonca 3	Goals	Marziali 4	Yeomju Indoor Aquatics Center, Gwangju; Referees: Ziliang Chen (CHN); Ogino Hiroaki (JPN)

6 July; 20:00	Report	Netherlands	8–9	Hungary	Yeomju Indoor Aquatics Center, Gwangju; Referees: Zhang Liang (CHN); Irfan Sadekov (RUS)
6 July; 20:00	Report	Score by quarters: 2-1, 1-0, 2-4, 3-4			Yeomju Indoor Aquatics Center, Gwangju; Referees: Zhang Liang (CHN); Irfan Sadekov (RUS)
6 July; 20:00	Report	Lindhout 3	Goals	four players 2	Yeomju Indoor Aquatics Center, Gwangju; Referees: Zhang Liang (CHN); Irfan Sadekov (RUS)

7 July; 15:30	Report	Australia	8–6	Italy	Yeomju Indoor Aquatics Center, Gwangju; Referees: Dario Blazevic (SRB); Haldun Tougarli (TUR)
7 July; 15:30	Report	Score by quarters: 1-0, 1-3, 2-2, 4-1			Yeomju Indoor Aquatics Center, Gwangju; Referees: Dario Blazevic (SRB); Haldun Tougarli (TUR)
7 July; 15:30	Report	two players 2	Goals	two players 2	Yeomju Indoor Aquatics Center, Gwangju; Referees: Dario Blazevic (SRB); Haldun Tougarli (TUR)

7 July; 17:00	Report	France	7–12	Hungary	Yeomju Indoor Aquatics Center, Gwangju; Referees: Joseph Peila (USA); Vladimir Gerzanich (RUS)
7 July; 17:00	Report	'Score by quarters: 2-1, 3-3, 1-3, 1-5			Yeomju Indoor Aquatics Center, Gwangju; Referees: Joseph Peila (USA); Vladimir Gerzanich (RUS)
7 July; 17:00	Report	Camarasa 4	Goals	Sedlmayer 4	Yeomju Indoor Aquatics Center, Gwangju; Referees: Joseph Peila (USA); Vladimir Gerzanich (RUS)

7 July; 18:30	Report	Brazil	11–7	South Korea	Yeomju Indoor Aquatics Center, Gwangju; Referees: Dragan Stampalija (SRB); Chen Ziliang (CHN)
7 July; 18:30	Report	Score by quarters: 3-1, 3-2, 2-2, 3-2			Yeomju Indoor Aquatics Center, Gwangju; Referees: Dragan Stampalija (SRB); Chen Ziliang (CHN)
7 July; 18:30	Report	Tenenbojn 3	Goals	three players 2	Yeomju Indoor Aquatics Center, Gwangju; Referees: Dragan Stampalija (SRB); Chen Ziliang (CHN)

8 July; 17:00	Report	Hungary	13–3	Brazil	Yeomju Indoor Aquatics Center, Gwangju; Referees: Zhang Liang (CHN); Hiroaki Ogino (JPN)
8 July; 17:00	Report	Score by quarters: 4-0, 3-1, 2-1, 4-1			Yeomju Indoor Aquatics Center, Gwangju; Referees: Zhang Liang (CHN); Hiroaki Ogino (JPN)
8 July; 17:00	Report	Kovacs 4	Goals	three players 1	Yeomju Indoor Aquatics Center, Gwangju; Referees: Zhang Liang (CHN); Hiroaki Ogino (JPN)

8 July; 18:30	Report	Italy	8–10	France	Yeomju Indoor Aquatics Center, Gwangju; Referees: Ernest Inesta Peralta (ESP); Dario Blazevic (SRB)
8 July; 18:30	Report	Score by quarters: 1-2, 2-1, 3-3, 2-4			Yeomju Indoor Aquatics Center, Gwangju; Referees: Ernest Inesta Peralta (ESP); Dario Blazevic (SRB)
8 July; 18:30	Report	Bruni 3	Goals	Marzouki 4	Yeomju Indoor Aquatics Center, Gwangju; Referees: Ernest Inesta Peralta (ESP); Dario Blazevic (SRB)

8 July; 20:00	Report	South Korea	5–24	Netherlands	Yeomju Indoor Aquatics Center, Gwangju; Referees: Zhang Liang (CHN); Yosuke Kajiwara (JPN)
8 July; 20:00	Report	Score by quarters: 2-6, 2-5, 1-4, 0-9			Yeomju Indoor Aquatics Center, Gwangju; Referees: Zhang Liang (CHN); Yosuke Kajiwara (JPN)
8 July; 20:00	Report	Chu 2	Goals	Lindhout 6	Yeomju Indoor Aquatics Center, Gwangju; Referees: Zhang Liang (CHN); Yosuke Kajiwara (JPN)

10 July; 17:00	Report	Italy	15–9	Netherlands	Yeomju Indoor Aquatics Center, Gwangju; Referees: Nikolaos Boudramis (GRE); Irfan Sadekov (RUS)
10 July; 17:00	Report	Score by quarters: 4-2, 4-1, 3-1, 4-5			Yeomju Indoor Aquatics Center, Gwangju; Referees: Nikolaos Boudramis (GRE); Irfan Sadekov (RUS)
10 July; 17:00	Report	Bruni 4	Goals	Lindhout 4	Yeomju Indoor Aquatics Center, Gwangju; Referees: Nikolaos Boudramis (GRE); Irfan Sadekov (RUS)

10 July; 18:30	Report	Australia	10–4	Brazil	Yeomju Indoor Aquatics Center, Gwangju; Referees: Yosuke Kajiwara (JPN); Joseph Peila (USA)
10 July; 18:30	Report	Score by quarters: 0-2, '5-1, 4-1, 1-0			Yeomju Indoor Aquatics Center, Gwangju; Referees: Yosuke Kajiwara (JPN); Joseph Peila (USA)
10 July; 18:30	Report	Edwards 3	Goals	Mendonca 2	Yeomju Indoor Aquatics Center, Gwangju; Referees: Yosuke Kajiwara (JPN); Joseph Peila (USA)

10 July; 20:00	Report	South Korea	2–15	Hungary	Yeomju Indoor Aquatics Center, Gwangju; Referees: Chen Ziliang (CHN); Hiroaki Ogino (JPN)
10 July; 20:00	Report	'Score by quarters: 1-3, 0-3, 1-5, 0-4			Yeomju Indoor Aquatics Center, Gwangju; Referees: Chen Ziliang (CHN); Hiroaki Ogino (JPN)
10 July; 20:00	Report	Chu 2	Goals	Kovács 4	Yeomju Indoor Aquatics Center, Gwangju; Referees: Chen Ziliang (CHN); Hiroaki Ogino (JPN)

==== Group B ====
Team	Pld	W	D	L	GF	GA	GD	Pts
Russia	5	5	0	0	59	35	+24	10
United States	5	4	0	1	50	43	+7	8
Serbia	5	2	1	2	51	37	+14	5
Japan	5	1	2	2	56	65	-9	4
Turkey	5	0	2	3	46	57	−11	2
China	5	0	1	4	38	63	−25	1

2 July; 15:30	Report	Russia	14–7	China	Yeomju Indoor Aquatics Center, Gwangju; Referees: Marie-Claude Deslieres (CAN); Ernest Inesta Peralta (ESP)
2 July; 15:30	Report	Score by quarters: 6–2, 3–0, 0–2, 5–3			Yeomju Indoor Aquatics Center, Gwangju; Referees: Marie-Claude Deslieres (CAN); Ernest Inesta Peralta (ESP)
2 July; 15:30	Report	Latypov, Krasnoc 3	Goals	Liang 5	Yeomju Indoor Aquatics Center, Gwangju; Referees: Marie-Claude Deslieres (CAN); Ernest Inesta Peralta (ESP)

2 July; 17:00	Report	United States	13–12	Japan	Yeomju Indoor Aquatics Center, Gwangju; Referees: Fabio Brasiliano (ITA); Zsolt Marjay (HUN)
2 July; 17:00	Report	Score by quarters: 2–3, 4–2, 4–3, 3–4			Yeomju Indoor Aquatics Center, Gwangju; Referees: Fabio Brasiliano (ITA); Zsolt Marjay (HUN)
2 July; 17:00	Report	Fellner 4	Goals	Iida 3	Yeomju Indoor Aquatics Center, Gwangju; Referees: Fabio Brasiliano (ITA); Zsolt Marjay (HUN)

2 July; 18:30	Report	Serbia	10–6	Turkey	Yeomju Indoor Aquatics Center, Gwangju; Referees: Gabor Boros-Djevi (AUS); Chen Ziliang (CHN)
2 July; 18:30	Report	Score by quarters: 1–1, 2–2, 2–2, 5–1			Yeomju Indoor Aquatics Center, Gwangju; Referees: Gabor Boros-Djevi (AUS); Chen Ziliang (CHN)
2 July; 18:30	Report	Stojanović 3	Goals	Yilmaz 2	Yeomju Indoor Aquatics Center, Gwangju; Referees: Gabor Boros-Djevi (AUS); Chen Ziliang (CHN)

4 July; 12:30	Report	China	11–13	Japan	Yeomju Indoor Aquatics Center, Gwangju; Referees: Gabor Boros-Djevi (AUS); Stefano Pinato (ITA)
4 July; 12:30	Report	Score by quarters: 2–4, 2–2, 3–5, 4–2			Yeomju Indoor Aquatics Center, Gwangju; Referees: Gabor Boros-Djevi (AUS); Stefano Pinato (ITA)
4 July; 12:30	Report	Hu, Chen 4	Goals	Adachi 8	Yeomju Indoor Aquatics Center, Gwangju; Referees: Gabor Boros-Djevi (AUS); Stefano Pinato (ITA)

4 July; 14:00	Report	Turkey	8–12	United States	Yeomju Indoor Aquatics Center, Gwangju; Referees: Nikolaos Boudramis (GRE); Erwin Schapers (NED)
4 July; 14:00	Report	Score by quarters: 3–3, 1–2, 2–5, 2–2			Yeomju Indoor Aquatics Center, Gwangju; Referees: Nikolaos Boudramis (GRE); Erwin Schapers (NED)
4 July; 14:00	Report	Cagatay 3	Goals	Roberts, Fellner 3	Yeomju Indoor Aquatics Center, Gwangju; Referees: Nikolaos Boudramis (GRE); Erwin Schapers (NED)

4 July; 15:30	Report	Russia	9–8	Serbia	Yeomju Indoor Aquatics Center, Gwangju; Referees: Marie-claude Deslieres (CAN); Dragan Stampalija (CRO)
4 July; 15:30	Report	Score by quarters: 2–2, 3–3, 1–2, 3–1			Yeomju Indoor Aquatics Center, Gwangju; Referees: Marie-claude Deslieres (CAN); Dragan Stampalija (CRO)
4 July; 15:30	Report	Nikolaenko, Latypov 3	Goals	Joksimovic 6	Yeomju Indoor Aquatics Center, Gwangju; Referees: Marie-claude Deslieres (CAN); Dragan Stampalija (CRO)

6 July; 12:30	Report	Japan	12–12	Turkey	Yeomju Indoor Aquatics Center, Gwangju; Referees: Erwin Schapers (NED); Zsolt Marjay (HUN)
6 July; 12:30	Report	Score by quarters: 2- 3, 5-2, 3-4, 2-3			Yeomju Indoor Aquatics Center, Gwangju; Referees: Erwin Schapers (NED); Zsolt Marjay (HUN)
6 July; 12:30	Report	Adachi, Hamada 3	Goals	Biyik 3	Yeomju Indoor Aquatics Center, Gwangju; Referees: Erwin Schapers (NED); Zsolt Marjay (HUN)

6 July; 14:00	Report	Serbia	13–1	China	Yeomju Indoor Aquatics Center, Gwangju; Referees: Lee Taik-weon; Gabor Boros-Djevi (AUS)
6 July; 14:00	Report	Score by quarters: 5-0, 1-0, 3-1, 4-0			Yeomju Indoor Aquatics Center, Gwangju; Referees: Lee Taik-weon; Gabor Boros-Djevi (AUS)
6 July; 14:00	Report	Stojanović, Anderjevic 3	Goals	Chu 1	Yeomju Indoor Aquatics Center, Gwangju; Referees: Lee Taik-weon; Gabor Boros-Djevi (AUS)

6 July; 15:30	Report	United States	6–9	Russia	Yeomju Indoor Aquatics Center, Gwangju; Referees: Dragan Stampalija (CRO); Fabio Brasiliano (ITA)
6 July; 15:30	Report	Score by quarters: 2-2, 2-2, 2-1, 0-4			Yeomju Indoor Aquatics Center, Gwangju; Referees: Dragan Stampalija (CRO); Fabio Brasiliano (ITA)
6 July; 15:30	Report	Roberts 2	Goals	Balakirev 2	Yeomju Indoor Aquatics Center, Gwangju; Referees: Dragan Stampalija (CRO); Fabio Brasiliano (ITA)

8 July; 12:30	Report	China	11–11	Turkey	Yeomju Indoor Aquatics Center, Gwangju; Referees: Fabio Brasiliano (ITA); Gabor Boros-Djevi (AUS)
8 July; 12:30	Report	Score by quarters: 5-2, 3-2, 1-3, 2-4			Yeomju Indoor Aquatics Center, Gwangju; Referees: Fabio Brasiliano (ITA); Gabor Boros-Djevi (AUS)
8 July; 12:30	Report	Liang 5	Goals	Cagatay 5	Yeomju Indoor Aquatics Center, Gwangju; Referees: Fabio Brasiliano (ITA); Gabor Boros-Djevi (AUS)

8 July; 14:00	Report	Russia	15–5	Japan	Yeomju Indoor Aquatics Center, Gwangju; Referees: Stefano Pinato (ITA); David Gerrie (AUS)
8 July; 14:00	Report	Score by quarters: 3-2, 4-1, 2-0, 6-2			Yeomju Indoor Aquatics Center, Gwangju; Referees: Stefano Pinato (ITA); David Gerrie (AUS)
8 July; 14:00	Report	Alexey 5	Goals	Adachi 2	Yeomju Indoor Aquatics Center, Gwangju; Referees: Stefano Pinato (ITA); David Gerrie (AUS)

8 July; 15:30	Report	Serbia	6–7	United States	Yeomju Indoor Aquatics Center, Gwangju; Referees: Nikolaos Boudramis (GRE); Zsolt Marjay (HUN)
8 July; 15:30	Report	Score by quarters: 1-2, 1-1, 4-2, 0-2			Yeomju Indoor Aquatics Center, Gwangju; Referees: Nikolaos Boudramis (GRE); Zsolt Marjay (HUN)
8 July; 15:30	Report	Gogov 2	Goals	Roberts 3	Yeomju Indoor Aquatics Center, Gwangju; Referees: Nikolaos Boudramis (GRE); Zsolt Marjay (HUN)

10 July; 12:30	Report	United States	12–8	China	Yeomju Indoor Aquatics Center, Gwangju; Referees: Zsolt Marjay (HUN); Erwin Schapers (NED)
10 July; 12:30	Report	Score by quarters: 3-2, 0-0, 6-4, 3-2			Yeomju Indoor Aquatics Center, Gwangju; Referees: Zsolt Marjay (HUN); Erwin Schapers (NED)
10 July; 12:30	Report	Dirving 3	Goals	Hu, Chen 2	Yeomju Indoor Aquatics Center, Gwangju; Referees: Zsolt Marjay (HUN); Erwin Schapers (NED)

10 July; 14:00	Report	Japan	14–14	Serbia	Yeomju Indoor Aquatics Center, Gwangju; Referees: Ernest Inesta Peralta (ESP); Fabio Brasiliano (ITA)
10 July; 14:00	Report	Score by quarters: 0-3, 5-4, 3-3, 6-4			Yeomju Indoor Aquatics Center, Gwangju; Referees: Ernest Inesta Peralta (ESP); Fabio Brasiliano (ITA)
10 July; 14:00	Report	three players 2	Goals	Stojanović 3	Yeomju Indoor Aquatics Center, Gwangju; Referees: Ernest Inesta Peralta (ESP); Fabio Brasiliano (ITA)

10 July; 15:30	Report	Russia	12–9	Turkey	Yeomju Indoor Aquatics Center, Gwangju
10 July; 15:30	Report	Score by quarters: 4-3, 3-0, 2-4, 3-2			Yeomju Indoor Aquatics Center, Gwangju
10 July; 15:30	Report	Latypov 4	Goals	Biyik 4	Yeomju Indoor Aquatics Center, Gwangju

== Final round ==
=== Places 9-13 ===
12 July; 12:30	Netherlands	17–6	China	Yeomju Indoor Aquatics Center, Gwangju

12 July; 14:00	Turkey	8–9	Brazil	Yeomju Indoor Aquatics Center, Gwangju

13 July; 12:30	Brazil	15–10	China	Yeomju Indoor Aquatics Center, Gwangju

13 July; 14:00	South Korea	7–16	Turkey	Yeomju Indoor Aquatics Center, Gwangju

14 July; 09:00	Turkey	9–19	Netherlands	Yeomju Indoor Aquatics Center, Gwangju

13 July; 10:30	South Korea	10–12	China	Yeomju Indoor Aquatics Center, Gwangju

=== Final eight ===
Quarterfinals
11 July
Russia	11
Italy	12
11 July
Australia	8
Serbia	10
11 July
France	9
United States	11
11 July
Hungary	12
Japan	7

Semifinals
12 July
Italy	10
Serbia	7
12 July
United States	3
Hungary	4

Final
14 July
Italy	13
Hungary	14
3rd place match
14 July
United States	5
Serbia	4

5th–8th semifinals
12 July
Australia	9
Russia	14
12 July
France	14
Japan	12

5th place match
13 July
Russia	16
France	13
7th place match
13 July
Australia	16
Japan	9

==== Quarterfinals ====
11 July; 12:30	Russia	11–12	Italy	Yeomju Indoor Aquatics Center, Gwangju

11 July; 14:00	Australia	8–10	Serbia	Yeomju Indoor Aquatics Center, Gwangju

11 July; 15:30	France	9–11	United States	Yeomju Indoor Aquatics Center, Gwangju

11 July; 17:00	Hungary	12–7	Japan	Yeomju Indoor Aquatics Center, Gwangju

==== 5th–8th semifinals ====
12 July; 15:30	Russia	14–9	Australia	Yeomju Indoor Aquatics Center, Gwangju

12 July; 17:00	France	14–12	Japan	Yeomju Indoor Aquatics Center, Gwangju

==== Semifinals ====
12 July; 18:30	Italy	10–7	Serbia	Yeomju Indoor Aquatics Center, Gwangju

12 July; 20:00	United States	3–4	Hungary	Yeomju Indoor Aquatics Center, Gwangju

-

==== 7th place match ====
13 July; 15:30	Australia	16–8	Japan	Yeomju Indoor Aquatics Center, Gwangju

==== 5th place match ====
13 July; 17:00	Russia	16–13	France	Yeomju Indoor Aquatics Center, Gwangju

-

==== 3rd place match ====
14 July; 12:00	Serbia	4–5	United States	Yeomju Indoor Aquatics Center, Gwangju

==== Final ====
14 July; 13:30	Italy	13–14	Hungary	Yeomju Indoor Aquatics Center, Gwangju

== Final standing ==
Rank	Team
1st place, gold medalist(s)	Hungary
2nd place, silver medalist(s)	Italy
3rd place, bronze medalist(s)	United States
4	Serbia
5	Russia
6	France
7	Australia
8	Japan
9	Netherlands
10	Brazil
11	Turkey
12	China
13	South Korea
