= Andy Hoepelman =

Dutch water polo player (born 1955)

Personal information
- Full name: Ilja Mohandas Hoepelman
- Born: March 26, 1955 (age 71) Hilversum, North Holland, Netherlands
Medal record
Men's water polo
Representing the Netherlands
Olympic Games
Bronze medal – third place	1976 Montreal	Team competition

Ilja Mohandas "Andy" Hoepelman (born March 26, 1955) is a Dutch former Olympic water polo player and current professor in medicine, subspecialty infectious diseases. He has more than 500 peer-reviewed articles on his name. He retired in August 2021. He won an Olympic bronze medal at the 1976 Montreal Olympics as part of the Dutch men's team. He is with his Masters team HZC de Robben European champion in Istanbul (2011), Budapest (2013), Rijeka (2016) and Kranj (2018). In 2015 the team became world Champion in Kazan. From 2012 to 2016 he was a member of the LEN TWPC (Technical Waterpolo Committee). Since 2017 he has been a member of the World Aquatics (FINA) TWPC, where his interest is in modernizing Waterpolo rules, education of referees and beach water polo. He was cofounder and chairman of the regional Waterpolo training Centre "Talent Centraal" until 2015 when TC was discontinued. In 2018 he founded together with others a regional Waterpolo training center where he currently serves as chairman. In 2020 he was re-elected as member of LEN TWPC. Since July 2020 he has been chairman of the Dutch Waterpolo club UZSC, 6 times champion in the Netherlands since 2014. In December 2020 he stepped down and became vice-chairman.

== Life ==
Hoepelman obtained MD and PhD degrees from Utrecht University, writing a dissertation entitled Iron and Infection. He worked at Rockefeller University in New York City and was head of the Department of Internal Medicine and Infectious Diseases at the University Medical Center in Utrecht until 2017. Since that time he has been Head of the division of Infectious Diseases at the University Medical Center. More than 50 students finished there thesis under his supervision. He has authored more than 500 peer-reviewed publications

His sons Ruben Hoepelman and Benjamin Hoepelman have followed their father in playing water polo at an international level.

== See also ==
- List of Olympic medalists in water polo (men)
