= Josip Crnić =

Croatian handball player (born 1989)

Personal information
- Nationality: Croatian
- Born: 11 January 1989 (age 37) Rijeka
- Height: 1.86 m (6 ft 1 in)

Sport
- Sport: Handball
- Position: Right wing
- Current club: NEXE
- Number: 7

Youth career
- Years: Team
- –: RK Kvarner
- –: RK Kozala
- –: Zamet

Senior clubs
- Years: Team
- 2005-2008: Zamet
- 2008-2010: Perutnina PIPO IPC
- 2010-2011: Poreč
- 2011-2013: RK Kozala
- 2011-2013: Siscia
- 2014-2016: NEXE
- (loan)2015: Đakovo
- 2016-present: OHV Aurich
National team
- Years: Team
- 2005-2006: Croatia U-18
- 2006-2007: Croatia U-19
- Croatia: 2009
Medal record
Representing Croatia
Cadet European Championship
Gold medal – first place	2006 Estonia	Team competition
Juniors World Championship
Silver medal – second place	2007 Bahrain	Team competition

Josip Crnić (born January 11, 1989) is a Croatian handball right winger.

== Club career ==
Crnić started his senior career in local premier league club Zamet. He would soon leave and spend two year at Perutnina Pipo IPC from Međimurje. In 2011 he returned to his youth club RK Kozala helping them earn promotion from 2.HRL to 1.HRL.

From 2011 to 2013 he played both for Kozala in the 1.HRL and for Siscia in the Dukat Premier League.

In 2013 he went into retirement due to job obligations.

He came out of retirement in 2014 and signed to RK Nexe Našice.

In July 2016 it was announced that Crnić had moved to German club OHV Aurich.

== International career ==
Crnić played for the Croatia U-18 and Croatia U-19 national team.

== Honours ==
Zamet

- Croatian Handball Championship U-18 Runner-up (1): 2008

Kozala

- 2.HRL Runner-up (1): 2011–12

NEXE Našice

- Dukat Premier League Runner-up (2): 2014–15, 2015–16
- Croatian Cup
  - Runner-up (1): 2015
  - Third (1): 2016

Individual

- Dražen Petrović Award - 2007
