= Marko Blažić (water polo) =

Croatian water polo player

Personal information
- Nationality: Croatian
- Born: 11 August 1999 (age 26) Rijeka, Croatia
- Height: 190 cm (6 ft 3 in)
- Weight: 110 kg (243 lb)

Sport
- Country: Croatia
- Sport: Water polo
- Club: VK Primorje

Marko Blažić (born August 11, 1999) is a Croatian professional water polo player. He is currently playing for VK Primorje. He is 6 ft 3 in (1.90 m) tall and weighs 243 lb (110 kg).
