= Kiyomu Date =

Japanese water polo player (born 1997)

Personal information
- Nationality: Japanese
- Born: 9 April 1997 (age 29) Saitama Prefecture, Japan
- Education: Nippon Sport Science University

Sport
- Sport: Water polo
- Position: Driver
Medal record
Men's water polo
Representing Japan
Asian Games
Gold medal – first place	2022 Hangzhou	Team
Gold medal – first place	2026 Aichi-Nagoya	Team

Kiyomu Date (Japanese: 伊達清武; born 9 April 1997) is a Japanese water polo player who plays as a driver. He represents Japan internationally and competed at the 2024 Summer Olympics. He won gold medals with Japan at the 2022 Asian Games and 2026 Asian Games.

== Early life and education ==
Date was born in Saitama Prefecture and began playing water polo at the age of nine. He attended Saitama Sakae High School, where he won the national high school championship and the National Sports Festival. He later attended Nippon Sport Science University, where he won four consecutive Intercollegiate Championships.

== Career ==
After graduating from university, Date played in overseas professional leagues before returning to Japan. He subsequently became a regular member of the Japanese national team and competed domestically for AIDEN and IKAI・Kingfisher74.

Date was selected for Japan's men's water polo team at the 2022 Asian Games, which were held in Hangzhou in 2023 after being postponed. Japan won the men's tournament and Date was part of the gold-medal-winning team.

In 2024, Date represented Japan at the 2024 Summer Olympics in Paris. Japan finished 11th in the men's water polo tournament.

In 2025, Date continued to represent Japan at major international competitions. He was a member of the Japanese team at the 2025 World Aquatics Championships in Singapore, where Japan finished ninth overall.

In 2026, Date was selected for Japan's men's water polo team at the 2026 Asian Games in Aichi-Nagoya. He was listed as a driver and represented Tokyo Gas Lifebal Yokohama Chuo Energy and AIDEN.

Before the Asian Games, Date said that Japan's objective was to retain the title it had won in Hangzhou. He also expressed his intention to promote water polo to children and spectators through his performances.

Japan advanced to the men's water polo final against Kazakhstan. On 3 October 2026, Japan defeated Kazakhstan 24–7 to win the gold medal and successfully defend its Asian Games title. Date scored one of Japan's goals in the opening period as Japan established a 5–0 lead and went on to win the final. The victory gave his second Asian Games gold medal and helped Japan win its fifth men's water polo title at the Asian Games.
