= Patrick Weissinger =

German water polo player and coach

Personal information
- Nationality: Germany
- Born: 2 April 1973 (age 53) Stuttgart, West Germany
- Height: 1.94 m (6 ft 4 in)
- Weight: 90 kg (200 lb)

Sport
- Sport: Water polo
- Position: centre back

Senior clubs
- Years: Team
- ?-?: Wasserfreunde Spandau 04
National team
- Years: Team
- ?-?: Germany

Teams coached
- ?-?: Germany

Patrick Weissinger (born 2 April 1973) is a German male water polo player and coach. He was a member of the Germany men's national water polo team, playing as a centre back. He was a part of the team at the 2004 Summer Olympics as the team captain. On the club level he played for Wasserfreunde Spandau 04 in Germany.

After his career he became a water polo coach, and was the coach of the German national team at the 2016 Men's European Water Polo Championship squads.
