= Lorenzo Bruni =

Italian water polo player (born 1994)

Personal information
- Nationality: Italian
- Born: 8 April 1994 (age 32) Prato, Italy
- Height: 190 cm (6 ft 3 in)
Medal record
Men's water polo
Representing Italy
World Championships
Silver medal – second place	2022 Budapest	Team
Silver medal – second place	2024 Doha	Team
European Championship
Bronze medal – third place	2024 Zagreb
World Cup
Silver medal – second place	2023 Los Angeles
Summer Universiade
Gold medal – first place	2019 Napoli	Team
Silver medal – second place	2015 Gwangju	Team
Bronze medal – third place	2017 Taipei	Team

Lorenzo Bruni (born 8 April 1994) is an Italian water polo player. He represented Italy at the 2024 Summer Olympics.
