= Ruben Hoepelman =

Dutch water polo player (born 1993)

Personal information
- Nationality: Dutch
- Born: 30 August 1993 (age 33)
- Height: 190 cm (75 in)
- Weight: 90 kg (198 lb)

Sport
- Sport: Water polo
- Handedness: Right
- Position: Goalkeeper
- Current club: UZSC
- Number: 13
National team
- Years: Team
- 2016–current: Netherlands

Ruben Hoepelman (born 30 August 1993) is a Dutch male water polo player who plays at the goalkeeper position. He is part of the Netherlands men's national water polo team. He competed at the 2016 Men's European Water Polo Championship.

He is the son of the water polo player Andy Hoepelman. His brother Benjamin Hoepelman is also playing water polo.
