= Luka Lozina =

Croatian water polo player

Personal information
- Nationality: Croatian
- Born: 6 January 1995 (age 31) Split, Croatia
- Height: 2.00 m (6 ft 7 in)
- Weight: 113 kg (249 lb)

Sport
- Country: Croatia
- Sport: Water polo
- Club: VK Jug

Luka Lozina (born 6 January 1995) is a Croatian professional water polo player. He is currently playing for VK Jug. He is 6 ft 7 in (2.00 m) tall and weighs 249 lb (113 kg).
