= Duje Pejković =

Croatian water polo player

Personal information
- Nationality: Croatian
- Born: 19 May 1998 (age 28) Split, Croatia
- Height: 1.96 m (6 ft 5 in)
- Weight: 107 kg (236 lb)

Sport
- Country: Croatia
- Sport: Water polo
- Club: VK Jadran Split

Duje Pejković (born May 19, 1998) is a Croatian professional water polo player. He is currently playing for VK Jadran Split. He is 6 ft 4 in (1.93 m) tall and weighs 236 lb (107 kg).
