= Lovro Paparić =

Croatian water polo player

Personal information
- Nationality: Croatian
- Born: 5 August 1999 (age 26) Rijeka, Croatia
- Height: 1.95 m (6 ft 5 in)
- Weight: 118 kg (260 lb)

Sport
- Country: Croatia
- Sport: Water polo
- Club: VK Primorje

Lovro Paparić (born August 5, 1999) is a Croatian professional water polo player. He is currently playing for VK Primorje. He is 6 ft 5 in (1.95 m) tall and weighs 260 lb (118 kg). He started playing waterpolo at the age of 6.
