= Antonio Esteller =

Spanish water polo player (born 1955)

Personal information
- Nationality: Spanish
- Born: 27 April 1955 (age 71) Barcelona, Spain

Sport
- Sport: Water polo
Medal record
Representing Spain
European Championships
Bronze medal – third place	1983 Rome	Team competition
Mediterranean Games
Silver medal – second place	1983 Casablanca	Team competition
Silver medal – second place	1987 Latakia	Team competition
Bronze medal – third place	1979 Split	Team competition

Antonio Esteller (born 27 April 1955) is a Spanish water polo player. He competed in the men's tournament at the 1980 Summer Olympics.
