= Michal Izdinsky =

French water polo player (born 1992)

Personal information
- Born: 23 July 1992 (age 34) Bratislava, Czechoslovakia
- Height: 178 cm (5 ft 10 in)
- Weight: 75 kg (165 lb)

Sport
- Country: France
- Sport: Water polo
- Club: Olympic Nice

Michal Izdinsky (born 23 July 1992) is a water polo player from France. He was part of the French team at the 2016 Summer Olympics, where the team was eliminated in the group stage.
