= Croatia men's national water polo team =

Croatia
- FINA code: CRO
- Nickname(s): Barakude (The Barracudas)
- Association: Croatian Water Polo Federation
- Confederation: LEN (Europe)
- Head coach: Ivica Tucak
- Asst coach: Pero Kuterovac; Jure Marelja; Pavo Marković; Renco Posinković
- Captain: Marko Bijač
- Most caps: Igor Hinić (417)
- Top scorer(s): Miho Bošković (369)

FINA ranking (since 2008)
- Current: 1 (as of 12 July 2025)
- Highest: 1 (2012, 2013, 2024)
- Lowest: 6 (2008)

Olympic Games (team statistics)
- Appearances: 8 (first in 1996)
- Best result: (gold) (2012)
- 5-time Olympian(s): Igor Hinić (1996–2012)
- Most medals: Perica Bukić (3 medals, 2 gold and 1 silver)
- Top scorer(s): Sandro Sukno (31 goals, 2012–2016)
- Most saves: Frano Vićan (123 saves, 2000–2012)
- Top sprinter(s): Maro Joković (25 sprints won, 2008–2016)
- Flag bearer(s): Perica Bukić (1996); Dubravko Šimenc (2004); Josip Pavić (2016)

World Championship
- Appearances: 16 (first in 1994)
- Best result: (gold) (2007, 2017, 2024)

World Cup
- Appearances: 9 (first in 1995)
- Best result: (silver) (2010)

World League
- Appearances: 9 (first in 2002)
- Best result: (gold) (2012)

European Championship
- Appearances: 17 (first in 1993)
- Best result: (gold) (2010, 2022)

Europa Cup
- Appearances: 1 (first in 2018)
- Best result: (gold) (2018)

Mediterranean Games
- Appearances: 6 (first in 1993)
- Best result: (gold) (2013)

Media
- Website: hvs.hr (in Croatian)
Medal record
| Event | 1st | 2nd | 3rd |
|---|---|---|---|
| Olympic Games | 1 | 3 | 0 |
| World Championship | 3 | 1 | 4 |
| World Cup | 0 | 1 | 1 |
| World League | 1 | 3 | 3 |
| European Championship | 2 | 3 | 1 |
| Europa Cup | 1 | 1 | 0 |
| Mediterranean Games | 1 | 1 | 1 |
| Total | 9 | 13 | 10 |
Olympic Games
| Gold medal – first place | 2012 London | Team |
| Silver medal – second place | 1996 Atlanta | Team |
| Silver medal – second place | 2016 Rio de Janeiro | Team |
| Silver medal – second place | 2024 Paris | Team |
World Championship
| Gold medal – first place | 2007 Melbourne | Team |
| Gold medal – first place | 2017 Budapest | Team |
| Gold medal – first place | 2024 Doha | Team |
| Silver medal – second place | 2015 Kazan | Team |
| Bronze medal – third place | 2009 Rome | Team |
| Bronze medal – third place | 2011 Shanghai | Team |
| Bronze medal – third place | 2013 Barcelona | Team |
| Bronze medal – third place | 2019 Gwangju | Team |
World Cup
| Silver medal – second place | 2010 Oradea | |
| Bronze medal – third place | 2014 Almaty | |
World League
| Gold medal – first place | 2012 Almaty | |
| Silver medal – second place | 2009 Podgorica | |
| Silver medal – second place | 2015 Bergamo | |
| Silver medal – second place | 2019 Belgrade | |
| Bronze medal – third place | 2010 Niš | |
| Bronze medal – third place | 2011 Florence | |
| Bronze medal – third place | 2017 Ruza | |
European Championship
| Gold medal – first place | 2010 Zagreb | |
| Gold medal – first place | 2022 Split | |
| Silver medal – second place | 1999 Florence | |
| Silver medal – second place | 2003 Kranj | |
| Silver medal – second place | 2024 Dubrovnik/Zagreb | |
| Bronze medal – third place | 2018 Barcelona | |
Europa Cup
| Gold medal – first place | 2018 Rijeka | |
| Silver medal – second place | 2019 Zagreb | |
Mediterranean Games
| Gold medal – first place | 2013 Mersin | |
| Silver medal – second place | 1993 Languedoc-Roussillon | |
| Bronze medal – third place | 1997 Bari | |

The Croatia men's national water polo team represents Croatia in international water polo competitions and is controlled by the Croatian Water Polo Federation. They have won gold medals in the Olympics, World and European Championships, FINA World League and Mediterranean Games, making them one of the most successful men's water polo teams in the world. Overall Croatia won 33 medals at competitions.

It was the first Croatian national team to win a gold medal at the Olympics or World Games, the World and European Championships.

Croatia played their 800th game since gaining independence on 20 August 2022 and they won their 517th victory.

== History ==
After the independence of Croatia the national water polo team competed at its first tournament and also its first finals at 1993 Mediterranean Games, followed by the 1993 European Championships where Croatia won 5th place.

Croatia has since become Olympic champion (2012), triple World champion (2007, 2017, 2024) and European champion (2010). Croatia has also won eight other medals at the Olympic Games, World Championships and European Championships and was fourth on six occasions. The team holds a record streak of winning 7 medals in a row at World Championships and has reached semi-finals in over 60% of appearances at the Olympic Games, World Championships and European Championships altogether since 2017. Since the formation of national team Croatia has qualified for every big tournament. It is the first Croatian national team in any Olympic team sport that has won gold medals at all three big competitions. Croatia has also won World League (2012) and Mediterranean Games (2013). The only competition Croatia has yet to win is World Cup where the national team won silver medal in 2010.

The team has been awarded with Franjo Bučar State Award for Sport in 1996. So far two International Swimming Hall of Fame inductees have been members of Croatia national team – Perica Bukić as a player and Ratko Rudić as a coach.

Croatia played their 800 game since gaining independence on 20 August 2022. and they won their 517 victory which makes 64,62% of victories.

== Results ==
=== Medals ===
Updated after 2024 World Championships

| Competition | 1st place, gold medalist(s) | 2nd place, silver medalist(s) | 3rd place, bronze medalist(s) | Total |
|---|---|---|---|---|
| Olympic Games | 1 | 3 | 0 | 4 |
| World Championship | 3 | 1 | 4 | 8 |
| World Cup | 0 | 1 | 1 | 2 |
| World League | 1 | 3 | 3 | 7 |
| European Championship | 2 | 3 | 1 | 6 |
| Europa Cup | 1 | 1 | 0 | 2 |
| Summer Universuade | 0 | 1 | 0 | 1 |
| Mediterranean Games | 1 | 1 | 1 | 3 |
| Total | 9 | 14 | 10 | 33 |

Champions Runners-up Third place Fourth place

=== Summer Olympics ===
| Year | Round | Position | Pld | W | D | L | GF | GA | GD |
|---|---|---|---|---|---|---|---|---|---|
| (Spain) 1992 | Could not participate in qualification | | | | | | | | |
| (United States) 1996 | Final | 2nd place, silver medalist(s) | 8 | 5 | 0 | 3 | 71 | 58 | +13 |
| (Australia) 2000 | Quarterfinal | 7th | 8 | 5 | 1 | 2 | 68 | 56 | +12 |
| (Greece) 2004 | Preliminary Round | 10th | 6 | 2 | 0 | 4 | 47 | 42 | +5 |
| (China) 2008 | Quarterfinal | 6th | 7 | 4 | 0 | 3 | 71 | 49 | +22 |
| (United Kingdom) 2012 | Final | 1st place, gold medalist(s) | 8 | 8 | 0 | 0 | 73 | 42 | +31 |
| (Brazil) 2016 | Final | 2nd place, silver medalist(s) | 8 | 5 | 0 | 3 | 66 | 62 | +4 |
| (Japan) 2020 | Quarterfinal | 5th | 8 | 5 | 0 | 3 | 99 | 82 | +17 |
| (France) 2024 | Final | 2nd place, silver medalist(s) | 8 | 4 | 0 | 4 | 88 | 86 | +2 |
| Total | Qualified: 8/8 | | 65 | 41 | 1 | 23 | 641 | 505 | +126 |

==== Record against other teams at the Summer Olympics ====
| National team | Pld | W | D | L | PF | PA | PD |
|---|---|---|---|---|---|---|---|
| Australia | 2 | 2 | 0 | 1 | 29 | 25 | +4 |
| China | 1 | 1 | 0 | 0 | 16 | 4 | +12 |
| Egypt | 1 | 1 | 0 | 0 | 12 | 1 | +11 |
| Germany | 1 | 1 | 0 | 0 | 13 | 5 | +8 |
| Greece | 3 | 3 | 0 | 0 | 25 | 16 | +9 |
| Hungary | 2 | 1 | 0 | 1 | 16 | 17 | −1 |
| Italy | 5 | 4 | 0 | 1 | 45 | 35 | +10 |
| Kazakhstan | 2 | 2 | 0 | 0 | 40 | 15 | +25 |
| Montenegro | 3 | 1 | 0 | 1 | 26 | 20 | +6 |
| Netherlands | 1 | 1 | 0 | 0 | 11 | 7 | +4 |
| Romania | 1 | 1 | 0 | 0 | 11 | 6 | +5 |
| Russia | 1 | 0 | 0 | 1 | 8 | 9 | −1 |
| Serbia | 3 | 2 | 0 | 2 | 43 | 44 | −1 |
| Serbia and Montenegro | 3 | 1 | 1 | 1 | 20 | 21 | −1 |
| Spain | 4 | 1 | 0 | 3 | 30 | 34 | −4 |
| Ukraine | 1 | 1 | 0 | 0 | 16 | 8 | +8 |
| United States | 6 | 2 | 0 | 4 | 45 | 42 | +3 |
| Total | 17 teams | | | | | | |

=== World Championships ===
| Year | Round | Position | Pld | W | D | L | GF | GA | GD |
|---|---|---|---|---|---|---|---|---|---|
| (Italy) 1994 | Semi-final | 4th | 7 | 4 | 0 | 3 | 87 | 57 | +30 |
| (Australia) 1998 | Second Round | 9th | 8 | 4 | 2 | 2 | 94 | 46 | +48 |
| (Japan) 2001 | Second Round | 8th | 8 | 4 | 0 | 4 | 70 | 52 | +18 |
| (Spain) 2003 | Second Round | 9th | 6 | 3 | 1 | 2 | 49 | 39 | +10 |
| (Canada) 2005 | Semi-final | 4th | 7 | 4 | 0 | 3 | 59 | 44 | +15 |
| (Australia) 2007 | Final | 1st place, gold medalist(s) | 6 | 6 | 0 | 0 | 62 | 40 | +22 |
| (Italy) 2009 | Semi-final | 3rd place, bronze medalist(s) | 6 | 5 | 0 | 1 | 63 | 35 | +28 |
| (China) 2011 | Semi-final | 3rd place, bronze medalist(s) | 6 | 5 | 0 | 1 | 72 | 42 | +30 |
| (Spain) 2013 | Semi-final | 3rd place, bronze medalist(s) | 7 | 6 | 0 | 1 | 89 | 44 | +45 |
| (Russia) 2015 | Final | 2nd place, silver medalist(s) | 6 | 5 | 0 | 1 | 68 | 45 | +23 |
| (Hungary) 2017 | Final | 1st place, gold medalist(s) | 6 | 6 | 0 | 0 | 70 | 47 | +23 |
| (South Korea) 2019 | Semi-final | 3rd place, bronze medalist(s) | 6 | 5 | 0 | 1 | 77 | 37 | +40 |
| (Hungary) 2022 | Semi-final | 4th | 7 | 4 | 1 | 2 | 81 | 66 | +15 |
| (Japan) 2023 | Classification round | 9th | 6 | 4 | 0 | 2 | 93 | 57 | +36 |
| (Qatar) 2024 | Final | 1st place, gold medalist(s) | 7 | 4 | 2 | 1 | 107 | 63 | +44 |
| (Singapore) 2025 | Classification round | 5th | 6 | 5 | 0 | 1 | 93 | 66 | +27 |
| Total | Qualified: 16/16 | | 105 | 74 | 6 | 25 | 1234 | 776 | +458 |

==== Record against other teams at the World Championships ====
| National team | Pld | W | D | L | PF | PA | PD |
|---|---|---|---|---|---|---|---|
| Australia | 6 | 5 | 0 | 1 | 49 | 43 | +6 |
| Brazil | 4 | 4 | 0 | 0 | 52 | 22 | +30 |
| Canada | 5 | 5 | 0 | 0 | 68 | 26 | +42 |
| China | 3 | 3 | 0 | 0 | 49 | 7 | +42 |
| Germany | 1 | 0 | 0 | 1 | 3 | 7 | −4 |
| Greece | 4 | 2 | 0 | 2 | 51 | 49 | +2 |
| Hungary | 5 | 2 | 1 | 3 | 50 | 56 | −6 |
| Italy | 4 | 1 | 1 | 2 | 32 | 34 | −2 |
| Japan | 2 | 2 | 0 | 0 | 26 | 9 | +17 |
| Kazakhstan | 1 | 1 | 0 | 0 | 19 | 4 | +15 |
| Montenegro | 4 | 4 | 0 | 0 | 40 | 21 | +19 |
| Netherlands | 2 | 2 | 0 | 0 | 23 | 13 | +10 |
| New Zealand | 3 | 3 | 0 | 0 | 75 | 8 | +67 |
| Romania | 3 | 3 | 0 | 0 | 25 | 18 | +7 |
| Russia | 6 | 3 | 0 | 3 | 51 | 38 | +13 |
| Serbia | 4 | 2 | 0 | 2 | 37 | 41 | −4 |
| Serbia and Montenegro | 2 | 0 | 1 | 1 | 10 | 11 | −1 |
| Slovakia | 1 | 1 | 0 | 0 | 12 | 3 | +9 |
| South Africa | 2 | 2 | 0 | 0 | 32 | 5 | +27 |
| Spain | 2 | 0 | 0 | 2 | 10 | 17 | −7 |
| United States | 6 | 5 | 0 | 1 | 56 | 43 | +13 |
| Total | 21 teams | | | | | | |

=== World Cup ===
| Year | Round | Position | Pld | W | D | L | GF | GA | GD |
|---|---|---|---|---|---|---|---|---|---|
| (Greece) 1993 | Could not qualify | | | | | | | | |
| (United States) 1995 | Preliminary Round | 6th | 5 | 2 | 0 | 3 | 25 | 31 | −6 |
| (Greece) 1997 | Preliminary Round | 8th | 5 | 1 | 0 | 4 | 30 | 40 | −10 |
| (Australia) 1999 | did not qualify | | | | | | | | |
| (Federal Republic of Yugoslavia) 2002 | Preliminary Round | 8th | 4 | 0 | 1 | 3 | 26 | 32 | −6 |
| (Hungary) 2006 | Semi-final | 4th | 6 | 2 | 1 | 3 | 54 | 56 | −2 |
| (Romania) 2010 | Final | 2nd place, silver medalist(s) | 6 | 5 | 0 | 1 | 74 | 43 | +31 |
| (Kazakhstan) 2014 | Semi-final | 3rd place, bronze medalist(s) | 6 | 4 | 0 | 2 | 43 | 37 | +6 |
| (Germany) 2018 | Quarterfinal | 5th | 6 | 4 | 1 | 1 | 84 | 41 | +43 |
| (United States) 2023 | did not qualify | | | | | | | | |
| (Montenegro) 2025 | Semi-final | 4th | 7 | 4 | 1 | 2 | 102 | 84 | +18 |
| (Australia) 2026 | Preliminary Round | 7th | 3 | 1 | 0 | 2 | 43 | 44 | −1 |
| Total | Qualified: 8/10 | | 48 | 23 | 4 | 21 | 481 | 480 | +73 |

==== Record against other teams at the World Cup ====
| National team | Pld | W | D | L | PF | PA | PD |
|---|---|---|---|---|---|---|---|
| Australia | 1 | 1 | 0 | 0 | 6 | 3 | +3 |
| China | 1 | 1 | 0 | 0 | 14 | 4 | +10 |
| Greece | 2 | 1 | 1 | 0 | 12 | 11 | +1 |
| Hungary | 3 | 0 | 0 | 3 | 17 | 30 | −13 |
| Iran | 1 | 1 | 0 | 0 | 23 | 2 | +21 |
| Italy | 2 | 0 | 0 | 2 | 9 | 13 | −4 |
| Kazakhstan | 1 | 1 | 0 | 0 | 14 | 7 | +7 |
| Montenegro | 1 | 1 | 0 | 0 | 6 | 5 | +1 |
| Netherlands | 1 | 1 | 0 | 0 | 9 | 7 | +2 |
| Romania | 1 | 1 | 0 | 0 | 10 | 7 | +3 |
| Russia | 2 | 1 | 0 | 1 | 17 | 19 | −2 |
| Serbia | 3 | 1 | 0 | 2 | 21 | 28 | −7 |
| Serbia and Montenegro | 3 | 1 | 0 | 2 | 18 | 18 | 0 |
| Spain | 5 | 0 | 1 | 4 | 33 | 45 | −12 |
| United States | 5 | 3 | 0 | 2 | 43 | 40 | +3 |
| Total | 15 teams | | | | | | |

=== World League ===
Wins/Defeats after penalty shootout counted as wins/defeats.
* marks instances of not qualifying for the super final due to "host rule".

| Year | Round | Position | Pld | W | D | L |
|---|---|---|---|---|---|---|
| (Greece) 2002 | did not qualify for the Super Final | | 12 | 2 | 0 | 10 |
| (United States) 2003 | did not compete | | | | | |
| (United States) 2004 | did not compete | | | | | |
| (Serbia and Montenegro) 2005 | Group Round | 4th | 14 | 8 | 0 | 6 |
| (Greece) 2006 * | did not qualify for the Super Final | | 11 | 7 | 0 | 4 |
| (Germany) 2007 | did not qualify for the Super Final | | 8 | 3 | 0 | 5 |
| (Italy) 2008 * | did not qualify for the Super Final | | 6 | 3 | 0 | 3 |
| (Montenegro) 2009 | Final | 2nd place, silver medalist(s) | 12 | 9 | 0 | 3 |
| (Serbia) 2010 | Semi-final | 3rd place, bronze medalist(s) | 12 | 8 | 0 | 4 |
| (Italy) 2011 | Semi-final | 3rd place, bronze medalist(s) | 11 | 10 | 0 | 1 |
| (Kazakhstan) 2012 | Final | 1st place, gold medalist(s) | 10 | 10 | 0 | 0 |
| (Russia) 2013 * | did not qualify for the Super Final | | 6 | 4 | 0 | 2 |
| (United Arab Emirates) 2014 | did not qualify for the Super Final | | 4 | 1 | 0 | 3 |
| (Italy) 2015 | Final | 2nd place, silver medalist(s) | 14 | 12 | 0 | 2 |
| (China) 2016 | did not qualify for the Super Final | | 6 | 4 | 0 | 2 |
| (Russia) 2017 | Semi-final | 3rd place, bronze medalist(s) | 12 | 10 | 0 | 2 |
| (Hungary) 2018 | Quarterfinal | 5th | 10 | 7 | 0 | 3 |
| (Serbia) 2019 | Final | 2nd place, silver medalist(s) | 13 | 9 | 0 | 4 |
| (Georgia (country)) 2020 | did not qualify for the Super Final | | 5 | 2 | 0 | 3 |
| (France) 2022 | did not qualify for the Super Final | | 5 | 3 | 0 | 2 |
| Total | Participated: 18/20 Qualified for the Super Final: 9/18 | | 171 | 112 | 0 | 59 |

=== European Championships ===
| Year | Round | Position | Pld | W | D | L | GF | GA | GD |
|---|---|---|---|---|---|---|---|---|---|
| (United Kingdom) 1993 | Preliminary round | 5th | 7 | 5 | 0 | 2 | 72 | 58 | +14 |
| (Austria) 1995 | Semi-final | 4th | 7 | 2 | 2 | 3 | 78 | 58 | +20 |
| (Spain) 1997 | Semi-final | 4th | 8 | 5 | 1 | 2 | 60 | 44 | +16 |
| (Italy) 1999 | Final | 2nd place, silver medalist(s) | 8 | 6 | 0 | 2 | 71 | 59 | +12 |
| (Hungary) 2001 | Semi-final | 4th | 8 | 3 | 2 | 3 | 63 | 57 | +6 |
| (Slovenia) 2003 | Final | 2nd place, silver medalist(s) | 8 | 6 | 0 | 2 | 66 | 55 | +11 |
| (Serbia) 2006 | Preliminary round | 7th | 8 | 4 | 2 | 2 | 90 | 72 | +18 |
| (Spain) 2008 | Semi-final | 4th | 8 | 4 | 1 | 3 | 81 | 69 | +12 |
| (Croatia) 2010 | Final | 1st place, gold medalist(s) | 7 | 6 | 0 | 1 | 71 | 44 | +27 |
| (Netherlands) 2012 | Preliminary round | 9th | 7 | 4 | 0 | 3 | 80 | 66 | +14 |
| (Hungary) 2014 | Quarterfinal | 5th | 7 | 3 | 2 | 2 | 64 | 54 | +10 |
| (Serbia) 2016 | Quarterfinal | 7th | 7 | 4 | 0 | 3 | 88 | 50 | +38 |
| (Spain) 2018 | Semi-final | 3rd place, bronze medalist(s) | 6 | 5 | 0 | 1 | 76 | 41 | +35 |
| (Hungary) 2020 | Semi-final | 4th | 6 | 4 | 0 | 2 | 75 | 53 | +22 |
| (Croatia) 2022 | Final | 1st place, gold medalist(s) | 6 | 5 | 1 | 0 | 73 | 41 | +42 |
| (Croatia) 2024 | Final | 2nd place, silver medalist(s) | 6 | 4 | 0 | 2 | 66 | 54 | +12 |
| (Serbia) 2026 | Main round | 6th | 7 | 4 | 0 | 3 | 106 | 70 | +36 |
| Total | Qualified: 17/17 | | 121 | 74 | 11 | 36 | 1280 | 945 | +335 |

==== Record against other teams at the European Championships ====
| National team | Pld | W | D | L | PF | PA | PD |
|---|---|---|---|---|---|---|---|
| Austria | 1 | 1 | 0 | 0 | 26 | 2 | +24 |
| France | 3 | 3 | 0 | 0 | 38 | 21 | +17 |
| Germany | 8 | 4 | 2 | 2 | 76 | 66 | +10 |
| Greece | 10 | 7 | 3 | 0 | 91 | 73 | +18 |
| Hungary | 12 | 2 | 1 | 9 | 108 | 128 | −20 |
| Italy | 9 | 5 | 1 | 3 | 66 | 62 | +4 |
| Montenegro | 5 | 2 | 0 | 3 | 46 | 49 | −3 |
| Netherlands | 3 | 3 | 0 | 0 | 40 | 13 | +27 |
| Romania | 4 | 2 | 0 | 2 | 43 | 35 | +8 |
| Russia | 5 | 3 | 1 | 1 | 44 | 36 | +8 |
| Serbia | 3 | 1 | 1 | 1 | 30 | 32 | −2 |
| Serbia and Montenegro | 4 | 1 | 0 | 3 | 30 | 32 | −2 |
| Slovakia | 6 | 5 | 0 | 1 | 64 | 37 | +27 |
| Slovenia | 3 | 3 | 0 | 0 | 37 | 16 | +21 |
| Spain | 9 | 6 | 1 | 2 | 80 | 73 | +7 |
| Turkey | 1 | 1 | 0 | 0 | 16 | 3 | +13 |
| Ukraine | 3 | 3 | 0 | 0 | 34 | 19 | +15 |
| Total | 17 teams | | | | | | |

=== Europa Cup ===
| Year | Round | Position | Pld | W | D | L |
|---|---|---|---|---|---|---|
| (Croatia) 2018 | Final | 1st place, gold medalist(s) | 8 | 7 | 0 | 1 |
| (Croatia) 2019 | Final | 2nd place, silver medalist(s) | 7 | 5 | 0 | 2 |
| Total | Participated: 2/2 Qualified for the Super Final: 2/2 | | 15 | 12 | 0 | 3 |

=== Mediterranean Games ===
| Year | Round | Position | Pld | W | D | L |
|---|---|---|---|---|---|---|
| (France) 1993 | Final | 2nd place, silver medalist(s) | | | | |
| (Italy) 1997 | Final | 2nd place, silver medalist(s) | | | | |
| (Tunisia) 2001 | Preliminary Round | 5th | | | | |
| (Spain) 2005 | Semi-final | 4th | 5 | 2 | 0 | 3 |
| (Italy) 2009 | Semi-final | 4th | 5 | 3 | 0 | 2 |
| (Turkey) 2013 | Final | 1st place, gold medalist(s) | 4 | 4 | 0 | 0 |
| (Spain) 2018 | did not participate | | | | | |
| (Algeria) 2022 | did not participate | | | | | |
| Total | Participated: 6/8 | | 14 | 9 | 0 | 5 |

== Team ==
=== Current squad ===
Roster for the 2026 Men's European Water Polo Championship.

Head coach: Ivica Tucak

| Name | Date of birth | Pos. | Club |
|---|---|---|---|
| Marko Bijač (C) | 12 January 1991 (age 35) | GK | (Croatia) VK Jadran Split |
| Rino Burić | 5 April 1997 (age 29) | DF | (Italy) Pro Recco |
| Loren Fatović | 16 November 1996 (age 29) | CF | (Croatia) VK Jadran Split |
| Luka Lončar | 26 June 1987 (age 39) | CF | (Croatia) HAVK Mladost |
| Franko Lazić | 25 February 1998 (age 28) | W | (Croatia) HAVK Mladost |
| Luka Bukić | 30 April 1994 (age 32) | W | (Croatia) HAVK Mladost |
| Ante Vukičević | 24 February 1993 (age 33) | W | (Croatia) HAVK Mladost |
| Marko Žuvela | 22 December 2001 (age 24) | DF | (Croatia) Jug AO Dubrovnik |
| Matias Biljaka | 20 January 1999 (age 27) | DF | (Croatia) HAVK Mladost |
| Josip Vrlić | 25 April 1986 (age 40) | CF | (Croatia) HAVK Mladost |
| Zvonimir Butić | 2 November 1998 (age 27) | W | (Croatia) VK Jadran Split |
| Konstantin Kharkov | 23 February 1997 (age 29) | W | (Croatia) HAVK Mladost |
| Ivan Marcelić | 23 February 1997 (age 29) | GK | (Croatia) HAVK Mladost |
| Filip Kržič | 28 August 2000 (age 25) | DF | (Croatia) Jug AO Dubrovnik |

=== Player statistics ===
Most appearances
| Player | Matches | Position | Active on Nat'l Team? |
|---|---|---|---|
| Igor Hinić | 417 | C | No |
| Tomislav Paškvalin | 285 | C | No |
| Samir Barać | 176 | PP | No |
| Andro Bušlje | 167 | HG | No |
| Teo Đogaš | 148 | PP | No |
| Frano Vićan | 129 | GK | No |
| Elvis Fatović | 128 | PP | No |
| Josip Pavić | 120 | GK | No |
| Damir Burić | 117 | HG | No |
| Miho Bošković | 108 | PP, HG | No |
| Sandro Sukno | 97 | PP | No |
| Petar Muslim | 90 | PP, SC | No |
| Maro Joković | 89 | PP | No |
| Nikša Dobud | 83 | C | No |
| Vjekoslav Kobešćak | 86 | PP | No |
| Ratko Štritof | 80 | HG | No |
| Ivan Buljubašić | 79 | HG | No |
| Paulo Obradović | 68 | PP, HG | No |
| Zdeslav Vrdoljak | 58 | PP | No |
| Anđelo Šetka | 57 | PP | No |
| Dubravko Šimenc | 52 | PP | No |
| Goran Volarević | 52 | GK | No |
| Frano Karač | 37 | PP | No |
| Tihomil Vranješ | 35 | PP | No |
| Pavo Marković | 33 | PP | No |
| Perica Bukić | 30 | PP | No |
| Antonio Petković | 22 | PP | No |
| Luka Lončar | 20 | C | Yes |

Top scorers
| Name | Goals | Average | Position |
|---|---|---|---|
| Miho Bošković | 369 | 3.42 | PP, HG |
| Paulo Obradović | 197 | | PP, HG |
| Maro Joković | 158 | | PP |
| Samir Barać | 135 | 0.77 | PP |
| Igor Hinić | 113 | 0.27 | C |
| Petar Muslim | 100 | | PP, SC |
| Nikša Dobud | 86 | 1.02 | C |

=== Head coaches ===
- Duško Antunović (1991–1993)
- Bruno Silić (1993–1998)
- Neven Kovačević (1998–2001)
- Veselin Đuho (2002–2003)
- Zoran Roje (2003–2005)
- Ratko Rudić (2005–2012)
- Ivica Tucak (2012–)

=== Notable players ===
- Milivoj Bebić (Note: FINA Water Polo Player of the Year in 1982, 1984 and 1985. Scored 28 goals in one game which is a world record for water polo game (final score: Yugoslavia 62–0 Guatemala). First water polo player in history to sign a 6 digit contract.)
- Zdravko Ježić
- Zdravko Kovačić
- Renco Posinković
- Karlo Stipanić

=== Naturalized players ===
Andrey Belofastov (Ukraine), Xavier García (Spain) Konstantin Kharkov (Russia),

== Statistics ==
=== Record against other teams ===
As of 10 August 2024 after game against Hungary in Olympic Games 2024

NO FRIENDLY fixtures.

Key
| Positive total balance (more wins) |
| Neutral total balance (equal W/L ratio) |
| Negative total balance (more losses) |

Wins/Defeats after penalty shootout counted as wins/defeats.

| National team | Total | | | | Olympic Games | | | | World Championship | | | | World Cup | | | | World League | | | | European Championship | | | | Europa Cup | | | | Mediterranean Games | | | | Qualifications | | | |
| National team | Pld | W | D | L | Pld | W | D | L | Pld | W | D | L | Pld | W | D | L | Pld | W | D | L | Pld | W | D | L | Pld | W | D | L | Pld | W | D | L | Pld | W | D | L |
|---|---|---|---|---|---|---|---|---|---|---|---|---|---|---|---|---|---|---|---|---|---|---|---|---|---|---|---|---|---|---|---|---|---|---|---|---|
| Argentina | 1 | 1 | 0 | 0 | 0 | 0 | 0 | 0 | 1 | 0 | 0 | 0 | 0 | 0 | 0 | 0 | 0 | 0 | 0 | 0 | — | — | — | — | — | — | — | — | — | — | — | — | 0 | 0 | 0 | 0 |
| Australia | 23 | 18 | 0 | 5 | 3 | 2 | 0 | 2 | 9 | 8 | 0 | 1 | 2 | 1 | 0 | 1 | 8 | 7 | 0 | 1 | — | — | — | — | — | — | — | — | — | — | — | — | 0 | 0 | 0 | 0 |
| Austria | 1 | 1 | 0 | 0 | 0 | 0 | 0 | 0 | 0 | 0 | 0 | 0 | 0 | 0 | 0 | 0 | 0 | 0 | 0 | 0 | 1 | 1 | 0 | 0 | 0 | 0 | 0 | 0 | — | — | — | — | 0 | 0 | 0 | 0 |
| Belarus | 1 | 1 | 0 | 0 | 0 | 0 | 0 | 0 | 0 | 0 | 0 | 0 | 0 | 0 | 0 | 0 | 0 | 0 | 0 | 0 | 0 | 0 | 0 | 0 | 0 | 0 | 0 | 0 | — | — | — | — | 1 | 1 | 0 | 0 |
| Brazil | 8 | 7 | 0 | 1 | 1 | 1 | 0 | 0 | 4 | 4 | 0 | 0 | 0 | 0 | 0 | 0 | 3 | 2 | 0 | 1 | — | — | — | — | — | — | — | — | — | — | — | — | 0 | 0 | 0 | 0 |
| Canada | 8 | 8 | 0 | 0 | 0 | 0 | 0 | 0 | 6 | 6 | 0 | 0 | 0 | 0 | 0 | 0 | 1 | 1 | 0 | 0 | — | — | — | — | — | — | — | — | — | — | — | — | 1 | 1 | 0 | 0 |
| China | 7 | 7 | 0 | 0 | 1 | 1 | 0 | 0 | 3 | 3 | 0 | 0 | 1 | 1 | 0 | 0 | 2 | 2 | 0 | 0 | — | — | — | — | — | — | — | — | — | — | — | — | 0 | 0 | 0 | 0 |
| Egypt | 1 | 1 | 0 | 0 | 1 | 1 | 0 | 0 | 0 | 0 | 0 | 0 | 0 | 0 | 0 | 0 | 0 | 0 | 0 | 0 | — | — | — | — | — | — | — | — | 0 | 0 | 0 | 0 | 0 | 0 | 0 | 0 |
| France | 13 | 12 | 0 | 1 | 1 | 0 | 0 | 1 | 1 | 1 | 0 | 0 | 0 | 0 | 0 | 0 | 4 | 4 | 0 | 0 | 5 | 5 | 0 | 0 | 1 | 1 | 0 | 0 | 0 | 0 | 0 | 0 | 1 | 1 | 0 | 0 |
| (Georgia (country)) Georgia | 3 | 3 | 0 | 0 | 0 | 0 | 0 | 0 | 1 | 1 | 0 | 0 | 0 | 0 | 0 | 0 | 0 | 0 | 0 | 0 | 1 | 1 | 0 | 0 | 0 | 0 | 0 | 0 | — | — | — | — | 1 | 1 | 0 | 0 |
| Germany | 27 | 21 | 2 | 4 | 1 | 1 | 0 | 0 | 3 | 2 | 0 | 1 | 0 | 0 | 0 | 0 | 12 | 11 | 0 | 1 | 9 | 5 | 2 | 2 | 0 | 0 | 0 | 0 | — | — | — | — | 2 | 2 | 0 | 0 |
| (United Kingdom) Great Britain | 1 | 1 | 0 | 0 | 0 | 0 | 0 | 0 | 0 | 0 | 0 | 0 | 0 | 0 | 0 | 0 | 0 | 0 | 0 | 0 | 0 | 0 | 0 | 0 | 0 | 0 | 0 | 0 | — | — | — | — | 1 | 1 | 0 | 0 |
| Greece | 42 | 26 | 6 | 10 | 4 | 3 | 0 | 1 | 5 | 1 | 1 | 3 | 2 | 1 | 1 | 0 | 14 | 9 | 0 | 5 | 13 | 9 | 4 | 0 | 2 | 1 | 0 | 1 | 2 | 2 | 0 | 0 | 0 | 0 | 0 | 0 |
| Hungary | 41 | 12 | 2 | 27 | 4 | 3 | 0 | 1 | 9 | 4 | 1 | 4 | 3 | 0 | 0 | 3 | 11 | 3 | 0 | 8 | 14 | 3 | 1 | 10 | 0 | 0 | 0 | 0 | — | — | — | — | 0 | 0 | 0 | 0 |
| Iran | 1 | 1 | 0 | 0 | 0 | 0 | 0 | 0 | 0 | 0 | 0 | 0 | 1 | 1 | 0 | 0 | 0 | 0 | 0 | 0 | — | — | — | — | — | — | — | — | — | — | — | — | 0 | 0 | 0 | 0 |
| Italy | 45 | 25 | 2 | 18 | 7 | 5 | 0 | 2 | 6 | 3 | 1 | 2 | 2 | 0 | 0 | 2 | 14 | 8 | 0 | 6 | 12 | 7 | 1 | 4 | 0 | 0 | 0 | 0 | 3 | 1 | 0 | 2 | 1 | 1 | 0 | 0 |
| Japan | 7 | 7 | 0 | 0 | 0 | 0 | 0 | 0 | 5 | 5 | 0 | 0 | 0 | 0 | 0 | 0 | 2 | 2 | 0 | 0 | — | — | — | — | — | — | — | — | — | — | — | — | 0 | 0 | 0 | 0 |
| Kazakhstan | 11 | 11 | 0 | 0 | 4 | 4 | 0 | 0 | 2 | 2 | 0 | 0 | 1 | 1 | 0 | 0 | 4 | 4 | 0 | 0 | — | — | — | — | — | — | — | — | — | — | — | — | 0 | 0 | 0 | 0 |
| (North Macedonia) Macedonia | 4 | 4 | 0 | 0 | 0 | 0 | 0 | 0 | 0 | 0 | 0 | 0 | 0 | 0 | 0 | 0 | 4 | 4 | 0 | 0 | 0 | 0 | 0 | 0 | 0 | 0 | 0 | 0 | 0 | 0 | 0 | 0 | 0 | 0 | 0 | 0 |
| Malta | 3 | 3 | 0 | 0 | 0 | 0 | 0 | 0 | 0 | 0 | 0 | 0 | 0 | 0 | 0 | 0 | 0 | 0 | 0 | 0 | 2 | 2 | 0 | 0 | 1 | 1 | 0 | 0 | 0 | 0 | 0 | 0 | 0 | 0 | 0 | 0 |
| Moldova | 1 | 1 | 0 | 0 | 0 | 0 | 0 | 0 | 0 | 0 | 0 | 0 | 0 | 0 | 0 | 0 | 0 | 0 | 0 | 0 | 0 | 0 | 0 | 0 | 0 | 0 | 0 | 0 | — | — | — | — | 1 | 1 | 0 | 0 |
| Montenegro | 31 | 20 | 0 | 11 | 8 | 7 | 0 | 1 | 4 | 3 | 0 | 1 | 1 | 1 | 0 | 0 | 9 | 3 | 0 | 6 | 7 | 4 | 0 | 3 | 1 | 1 | 0 | 0 | 0 | 0 | 0 | 0 | 1 | 1 | 0 | 0 |
| Netherlands | 14 | 14 | 0 | 0 | 1 | 1 | 0 | 0 | 2 | 2 | 0 | 0 | 1 | 1 | 0 | 0 | 4 | 4 | 0 | 0 | 5 | 5 | 0 | 0 | 1 | 1 | 0 | 0 | — | — | — | — | 0 | 0 | 0 | 0 |
| New Zealand | 3 | 3 | 0 | 0 | 0 | 0 | 0 | 0 | 3 | 3 | 0 | 0 | 0 | 0 | 0 | 0 | 0 | 0 | 0 | 0 | — | — | — | — | — | — | — | — | — | — | — | — | 0 | 0 | 0 | 0 |
| Poland | 1 | 1 | 0 | 0 | 0 | 0 | 0 | 0 | 0 | 0 | 0 | 0 | 0 | 0 | 0 | 0 | 0 | 0 | 0 | 0 | 0 | 0 | 0 | 0 | 0 | 0 | 0 | 0 | — | — | — | — | 1 | 1 | 0 | 0 |
| Puerto Rico | 1 | 1 | 0 | 0 | 0 | 0 | 0 | 0 | 0 | 0 | 0 | 0 | 0 | 0 | 0 | 0 | 0 | 0 | 0 | 0 | — | — | — | — | — | — | — | — | — | — | — | — | 1 | 1 | 0 | 0 |
| Romania | 18 | 15 | 0 | 3 | 2 | 2 | 0 | 0 | 3 | 3 | 0 | 0 | 1 | 1 | 0 | 0 | 4 | 3 | 0 | 1 | 4 | 2 | 0 | 2 | 1 | 1 | 0 | 0 | — | — | — | — | 3 | 3 | 0 | 0 |
| Russia | 35 | 23 | 1 | 11 | 1 | 1 | 0 | 0 | 7 | 4 | 0 | 3 | 2 | 1 | 0 | 1 | 18 | 13 | 0 | 5 | 6 | 4 | 1 | 1 | 0 | 0 | 0 | 0 | — | — | — | — | 1 | 0 | 0 | 1 |
| Serbia * | 48 | 18 | 8 | 27 | 7 | 4 | 1 | 2 | 8 | 4 | 1 | 3 | 7 | 2 | 1 | 4 | 11 | 2 | 0 | 9 | 9 | 2 | 1 | 6 | 3 | 3 | 0 | 0 | 2 | 0 | 0 | 2 | 0 | 0 | 0 | 0 |
| Slovakia | 9 | 8 | 0 | 1 | 0 | 0 | 0 | 0 | 1 | 1 | 0 | 0 | 0 | 0 | 0 | 0 | 0 | 0 | 0 | 0 | 7 | 6 | 0 | 1 | 0 | 0 | 0 | 0 | — | — | — | — | 1 | 1 | 0 | 0 |
| Slovenia | 6 | 6 | 0 | 0 | 0 | 0 | 0 | 0 | 0 | 0 | 0 | 0 | 0 | 0 | 0 | 0 | 0 | 0 | 0 | 0 | 3 | 3 | 0 | 0 | 0 | 0 | 0 | 0 | 1 | 1 | 0 | 0 | 2 | 2 | 0 | 0 |
| South Africa | 6 | 6 | 0 | 0 | 0 | 0 | 0 | 0 | 3 | 3 | 0 | 0 | 1 | 1 | 0 | 0 | 2 | 2 | 0 | 0 | — | — | — | — | — | — | — | — | — | — | — | — | 0 | 0 | 0 | 0 |
| Spain | 43 | 19 | 2 | 22 | 7 | 2 | 0 | 5 | 5 | 0 | 0 | 5 | 5 | 0 | 1 | 4 | 11 | 6 | 0 | 5 | 9 | 6 | 1 | 2 | 2 | 2 | 0 | 0 | 4 | 3 | 0 | 1 | 0 | 0 | 0 | 0 |
| Turkey | 10 | 10 | 0 | 0 | 0 | 0 | 0 | 0 | 0 | 0 | 0 | 0 | 0 | 0 | 0 | 0 | 6 | 6 | 0 | 0 | 2 | 2 | 0 | 0 | 0 | 0 | 0 | 0 | 2 | 2 | 0 | 0 | 0 | 0 | 0 | 0 |
| Switzerland | 1 | 1 | 0 | 0 | 0 | 0 | 0 | 0 | 0 | 0 | 0 | 0 | 0 | 0 | 0 | 0 | 0 | 0 | 0 | 0 | 0 | 0 | 0 | 0 | 0 | 0 | 0 | 0 | — | — | — | — | 1 | 1 | 0 | 0 |
| Ukraine | 4 | 4 | 0 | 0 | 1 | 1 | 0 | 0 | 0 | 0 | 0 | 0 | 0 | 0 | 0 | 0 | 0 | 0 | 0 | 0 | 3 | 3 | 0 | 0 | 0 | 0 | 0 | 0 | — | — | — | — | 0 | 0 | 0 | 0 |
| United States | 37 | 25 | 0 | 12 | 9 | 4 | 0 | 5 | 8 | 7 | 0 | 1 | 7 | 5 | 0 | 2 | 13 | 9 | 0 | 4 | — | — | — | — | — | — | — | — | — | — | — | — | 0 | 0 | 0 | 0 |
| Total (36) | 515 | 344 | 19 | 152 | | | | | | | | | | | | | | | | | | | | | | | | | | | | | | | | |

* includes games against Serbia and Montenegro / FR Yugoslavia

=== Biggest wins ===
double digit goal difference

| Olympic Games | World Championship | World Cup | World League | European Championship | Europa Cup | Mediterranean Games | Qualifications |
|---|---|---|---|---|---|---|---|
| +12 vs. China (16–4) 2008; +11 vs. Egypt (12–1) 2004 | +34 vs. New Zealand (35–1) 1994; +19 vs. South Africa (19–0) 2013; +17 vs. New Zealand (21–4) 2013; +16 vs. New Zealand (19–3) 1998; +15 vs. Canada (19–4) 2005; +15 vs. Kazakhstan (19–4) 1998; +11 vs. Brasil (17–6) 1998; +11 vs. Japan (18–7) 2011; +10 vs. Canada (13–3) 2003; +10 vs. China (15–5) 2009; +10 vs. Japan (16–6) 2017; +10 vs. Russia (13–3) 2007 | +23 vs. South Africa (25–2) 2018; +21 vs. Iran (23–2) 2010; +13 vs. South Africa (16–3) 2018; +10 vs. China (14–4) 2010 | +21 vs. South Africa (22–1) 2010; +19 vs. Turkey (20–1) 2013; +17 vs. Brasil (20–3) 2012; +16 vs. Kazakhstan (20–4) 2019; +16 vs. Kazakhstan (19–3) 2017; +14 vs. Turkey (17–3) 2013; +13 vs. Spain (19–6) 2006; +13 vs. Turkey (19–6) 2016; +13 vs. Turkey (16–3) 2016; +11 vs. Netherlands (18–7) 2017; +10 vs. Brasil (17–7) 2005; +10 vs. China (15–5) 2011; +10 vs. China (14–4) 2015; +10 vs. France (16–6) 2017; +10 vs. Kazakhstan (15–5) 2018; +10 vs. Netherlands (17–7) 2017; +10 vs. Russia (14–4) 2018; +10 vs. Turkey (13–3) 2015 | +24 vs. Austria (26–2) 1995; +21 vs. Turkey (23–2) 2018; +20 vs. Malta (22–2) 2016; +15 vs. France (20–5) 2016; +13 vs. Turkey (16–3) 2010; +12 vs. Netherlands (16–4) 2012; +11 vs. Slovenia (19–8) 2006; +10 vs. Slovakia (15–5) 2008 | +15 vs. France (20–5) 2018; +12 vs. Netherlands (16–4) 2018; +11 vs. Malta (16–5) 2018 | +13 vs. Turkey (17–4) 2013; +11 vs. Greece (14–3) 2009 | +20 vs. Georgia (23–3) 1999; +17 vs. Puerto Rico (18–1) 2004; +12 vs. Romania (12–0) 2004 |

=== Biggest losses ===
| Olympic Games | World Championship | World Cup | World League | European Championship | Europa Cup | Mediterranean Games |
|---|---|---|---|---|---|---|
| -4 vs. Serbia (7–11) 2016; -4 vs. Italy (7–11) 2004 | -7 vs. Serbia (4–11) 2015; -6 vs. Hungary (4–10) 2005; -5 vs. Spain (6–11) 1994 | -6 vs. Serbia (7–13) 2010; -5 vs. Hungary (6–11) 1997; -5 vs. Russia (5–10) 1997; -5 vs. Spain (2–7) 1995 | -9 vs. Hungary (6–15) 2007; -8 vs. Greece (5–13) 2008; -7 vs. Brasil (10–17) 2015 | -7 vs. Serbia (6–13) 2016; -6 vs. Hungary (5–11) 1995; -5 vs. Hungary (11–16) 2006 | -2 vs. Greece 2018; -2 vs. Hungary 2019 | -9 vs. Italy (5–14) 2005; -6 vs. Serbia (8–14) 2009 |

== Non-senior competitions ==
=== World Youth Championship ===
U-18

| Year | Round | Position |
|---|---|---|
| (Australia) 2012 | Semi-final | 4th |
| (Turkey) 2014 | Quarterfinal | 8th |
| (Montenegro) 2016 | Champions | 1st |
| (Hungary) 2018 | Quarterfinal | 6th |
| (Serbia) 2022 | Quarterfinal | 5th |
| (Argentina) 2024 | Quarterfinal | 8th |
| (Portugal) 2026 | Champions | 1st |

=== World Junior Championship ===
U-20

| Year | Round | Position |
|---|---|---|
| (United States) 1991 | | |
| (Egypt) 1993 | | |
| (France) 1995 | | |
| (Cuba) 1997 | Final | 1st place, gold medalist(s) |
| (Kuwait) 1999 | | |
| (Turkey) 2001 | Final | 2nd place, silver medalist(s) |
| (Italy) 2003 | Quarterfinal | 7th |
| (Argentina) 2005 | Final | 2nd place, silver medalist(s) |
| (United States) 2007 | Semi-final | 3rd place, bronze medalist(s) |
| (Croatia) 2009 | Final | 1st place, gold medalist(s) |
| (Greece) 2011 | Quarterfinal | 6th |
| (Hungary) 2013 | Final | 2nd place, silver medalist(s) |
| (Kazakhstan) 2015 | | |
| (Serbia) 2017 | Final | 2nd place, silver medalist(s) |
| (Croatia) 2025 | Semi-final | 3rd place, bronze medalist(s) |

=== European Youth Championship ===
U-17

| Year | Round | Position |
|---|---|---|
| (Turkey) 2003 | Semi-final | 3rd place, bronze medalist(s) |
| (Bulgaria) 2005 | Final | 2nd place, silver medalist(s) |
| (Malta) 2007 | Semi-final | 3rd place, bronze medalist(s) |
| (Serbia) 2008 | Semi-final | 3rd place, bronze medalist(s) |
| (Greece) 2009 | Final | 1st place, gold medalist(s) |
| (Croatia) 2011 | Final | 1st place, gold medalist(s) |
| (Malta) 2013 | Qualified | |
| (Azerbaijan) 2015 * | Semi-final | 4th |

* incorporated in the 1st European Games

=== European Junior Championship ===
U-19

| Year | Round | Position |
|---|---|---|
| (Malta) 2004 | Final | 2nd place, silver medalist(s) |
| (Romania) 2006 | Semi-final | 4th |
| (Turkey) 2008 | Quarterfinal | 5th |
| (Germany) 2010 | Semi-final | 3rd place, bronze medalist(s) |
| (France) 2012 | Semi-final | 3rd place, bronze medalist(s) |
| (Georgia (country)) 2014 | Semi-final | 3rd place, bronze medalist(s) |
| (Bulgaria) 2024 | Champions | 1st place, gold medalist(s) |

== Awards ==
- Croatian team of the year: 1999, 2017, 2010, 2011, 2012, 2017

== See also ==
- Croatia men's Olympic water polo team records and statistics
- Yugoslavia men's national water polo team
- List of Olympic champions in men's water polo
- List of men's Olympic water polo tournament records and statistics
- List of world champions in men's water polo
