= Josip Pavić =

Croatian water polo player

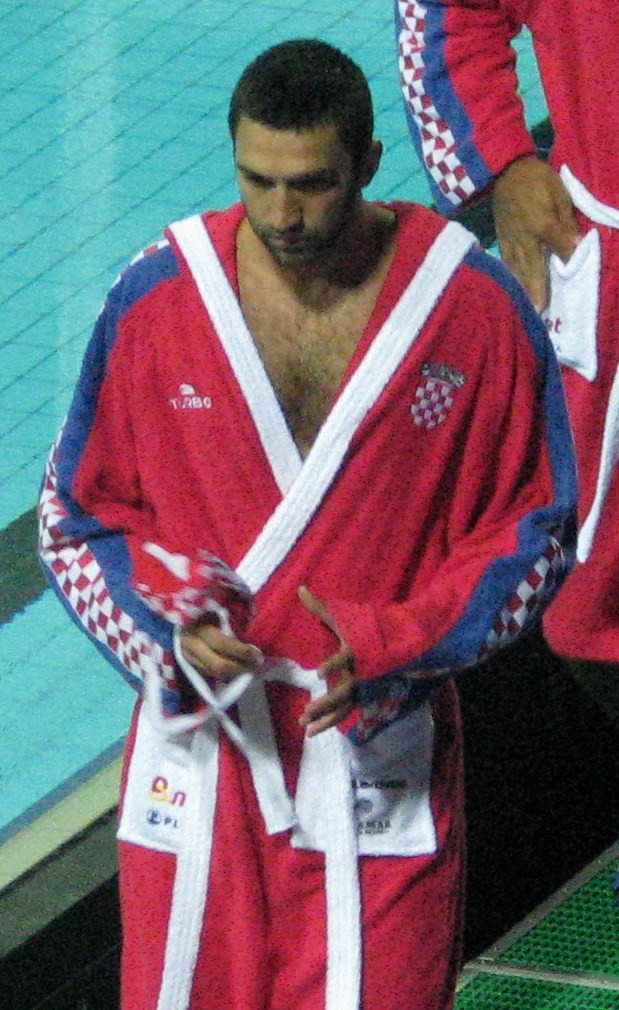

Personal information
- Nationality: Croatian
- Born: 15 January 1982 (age 44) Split, SR Croatia, SFR Yugoslavia
- Height: 1.95 m (6 ft 5 in)
- Weight: 90 kg (198 lb)

Sport
- Country: Croatia
- Sport: Water polo
- Club: Olympiacos
Medal record
Olympic Games
Gold medal – first place	2012 London	Team
Silver medal – second place	2016 Rio de Janeiro	Team
World Championship
Gold medal – first place	2007 Melbourne	Team
Silver medal – second place	2015 Kazan	Team
Bronze medal – third place	2009 Rome	Team
Bronze medal – third place	2011 Shanghai	Team
Bronze medal – third place	2013 Barcelona	Team
European Championship
Gold medal – first place	2010 Zagreb
World Cup
Silver medal – second place	2010 Oradea
FINA World League
Gold medal – first place	2012 Almaty
Silver medal – second place	2015 Bergamo
Silver medal – second place	2009 Podgorica
Bronze medal – third place	2010 Niš
Bronze medal – third place	2011 Florence
Mediterranean Games
Gold medal – first place	2013 Mersin	Team

Josip Pavić (Croatian pronunciation: [jǒsip pǎːʋitɕ]; born 15 January 1982) is a Croatian water polo player who competed in the 2008, 2012 and 2016 Summer Olympics, winning the gold medal in 2012 and the silver in 2016. He was widely regarded as the best goalkeeper in the 2012 Olympic tournament. He was named the best world water polo player in 2012, by FINA.

Pavić was given the honour to carry the national flag of Croatia at the opening ceremony of the 2016 Summer Olympics in Rio, becoming the 24th water polo player to be a flag bearer at the opening and closing ceremonies of the Olympics.

Since 2015, he plays for Greek powerhouse Olympiacos. In 2018, he won the 2017–18 LEN Champions League as captain of Olympiacos and he was voted Final Eight MVP.

== Honours ==
=== Club ===
HAVK Mladost

- Croatian Championship: 2001–02, 2002–03, 2007–08
- Croatian Cup: 2001–02, 2005–06, 2010–11, 2011–12
- LEN Euro Cup runners-up: 2013–14

Olympiacos

- Greek Championship: 2015–16, 2016–17, 2017–18, 2018–19
- Greek Cup: 2015–16, 2017–18, 2018–19
- Greek Super Cup: 2018
- LEN Champions League: 2017–18;runners-up: 2015–16, 2018–19

== Awards ==
- Member of the Best Team of the Year 2000–2020 in the World by total-waterpolo
- FINA "World Player of the Year" award: 2012
- Swimming World Magazine's man water polo ''World Player of the Year"award: 2012
- Olympics Tournament MVP: 2012 Pekin
- Croatian Water Polo Player of the Year: 2005, 2011, 2012 with Mladost
- Best Croatian Goalkeeper of the Year: 2011–12, 2012–13 with Mladost
- Best Goalkeeper of 2015 World League
- Best Goalkeeper of 2015 World Championship
- Best Goalkeeper of Greek Championship: 2015–16, 2017–18, 2018–19 with Olympiacos
- LEN Champions League MVP: 2017–18
- LEN Champions League Goalkeeper of the Year: 2017–18
- Best Goalkeeper of 2018 Final Eight with Olympiacos
- LEN Champions League Final Eight MVP: 2018 with Olympiacos
- All-Tournament Team of the 2015 World Championship

== See also ==
- Croatia men's Olympic water polo team records and statistics
- List of Olympic champions in men's water polo
- List of Olympic medalists in water polo (men)
- List of men's Olympic water polo tournament goalkeepers
- List of flag bearers for Croatia at the Olympics
- List of world champions in men's water polo
- List of World Aquatics Championships medalists in water polo

Sporting positions
Preceded by Samir Barać	Croatia captain 2013–2016	Succeeded by Sandro Sukno
Awards
Preceded by (Serbia) Filip Filipović	FINA Water Polo Player of the Year; 2012	Succeeded by (Hungary) Dénes Varga
Olympic Games
Preceded by Venio Losert	Flagbearer for Croatia; Rio de Janeiro 2016	Succeeded by Incumbent
