= Nikša Dobud =

Croatian water polo player

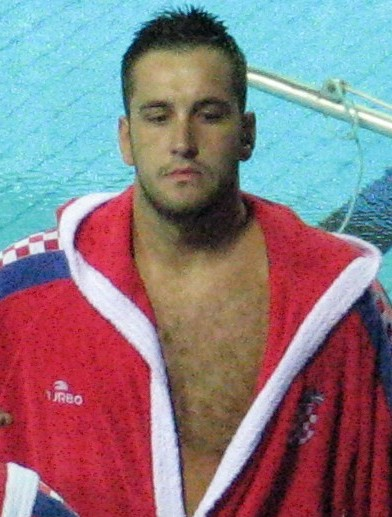

Personal information
- Nationality: Croatian
- Born: 5 August 1985 (age 40) Dubrovnik, SR Croatia, SFR Yugoslavia
- Height: 2.00 m (6 ft 7 in)
- Weight: 125 kg (276 lb)

Sport
- Country: Croatia
- Sport: Water polo
Medal record
Olympic Games
Gold medal – first place	2012 London	Team
World Championship
Bronze medal – third place	2009 Rome	Team competition
Bronze medal – third place	2011 Shanghai	Team competition
Bronze medal – third place	2013 Barcelona	Team competition
European Championship
Gold medal – first place	2010 Zagreb	Team competition
World Cup
Silver medal – second place	2010 Oradea	Team competition
FINA World League
Gold medal – first place	2012 Almaty	Team competition
Silver medal – second place	2009 Podgorica	Team competition
Bronze medal – third place	2010 Niš	Team competition
Bronze medal – third place	2011 Florence	Team competition
Mediterranean Games
Gold medal – first place	2013 Mersin	Team

Nikša Dobud (born 5 August 1985) is a Croatian water polo player. At the 2012 Summer Olympics, he competed for the Croatia men's national water polo team in the men's event. He is 6 ft 7 in (201 cm) tall and weighs 276 lb (125 kg).

In 2015, Dobud received a four-year suspension for attempting to evade a FINA drug test.

His suspension ended in April 2019. He then signed a contract to play for Italian water polo club Pro Recco. He also intended to play for Maltese club San Giljan in the summer.

== See also ==
- Croatia men's Olympic water polo team records and statistics
- List of Olympic champions in men's water polo
- List of Olympic medalists in water polo (men)
- List of World Aquatics Championships medalists in water polo
