= Igor Hinić =

Croatian water polo player

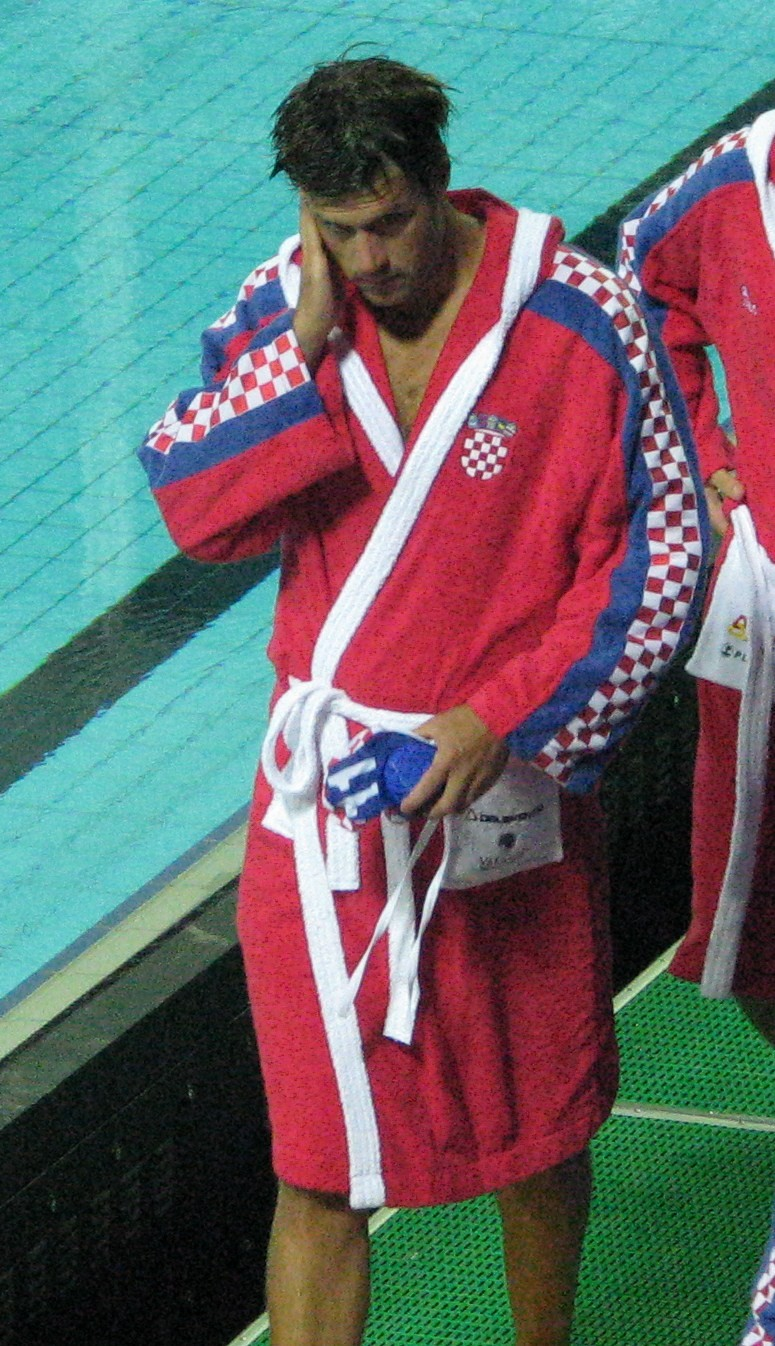
- Hinić in 2010 with Croatia

Personal information
- Nationality: Croatian
- Born: 4 December 1975 (age 50) Rijeka, SR Croatia, SFR Yugoslavia
- Height: 203 cm (80 in)
- Weight: 110 kg (243 lb)

Sport
- Sport: Water polo
- Handedness: Right

Senior clubs
- Years: Team
- 1990–2000: Primorje
- 2000–2001: Roma
- 2001–2008: Brescia
- 2006: Jadran Kostrena
- 2008–2012: HAVK Mladost
- 2012–2016: Enka SK
National team
- Years: Team
- Croatia
Medal record
Men's water polo
Representing Croatia
Olympic Games
Gold medal – first place	2012 London	Team
Silver medal – second place	1996 Atlanta	Team
World Championship
Gold medal – first place	2007 Melbourne	Team
Bronze medal – third place	2009 Rome	Team
European Championship
Gold medal – first place	2010 Zagreb	Team
Silver medal – second place	1999 Florence	Team
Silver medal – second place	2003 Kranj	Team
World Cup
Silver medal – second place	2010 Oradea	Team
World League
Gold medal – first place	2012 Almaty	Team
Silver medal – second place	2009 Podgorica	Team

Igor Hinić (born 4 December 1975) is a Croatian former professional water polo player, who was a member of the Croatia national team, that won the silver medal at the 1996 Summer Olympics in Atlanta, and the gold medal at the 2012 Summer Olympics in London.

Hinić played in five consecutive Summer Olympics for his native country from 1996 to 2012. He is, jointly with Greek Georgios Afroudakis and Hungarian Tamás Kásás, the tenth athlete to compete in water polo at five Olympics. He was also voted the Croatia national team's most valuable player.

He played for Primorje, Brescia, Mladost, Enka Istanbul, and was right handed. He won the Italian Championship 2003, and Turkish Championship in 2015.

Currently, Hinić is the coach in his hometown of Rijeka. He is 6'8" tall and weighs 243 lbs.

== See also ==
- Croatia men's Olympic water polo team records and statistics
- List of athletes with the most appearances at Olympic Games
- List of players who have appeared in multiple men's Olympic water polo tournaments
- List of Olympic champions in men's water polo
- List of Olympic medalists in water polo (men)
- List of world champions in men's water polo
- List of World Aquatics Championships medalists in water polo
