= Andro Bušlje =

Croatian water polo player (born 1986)

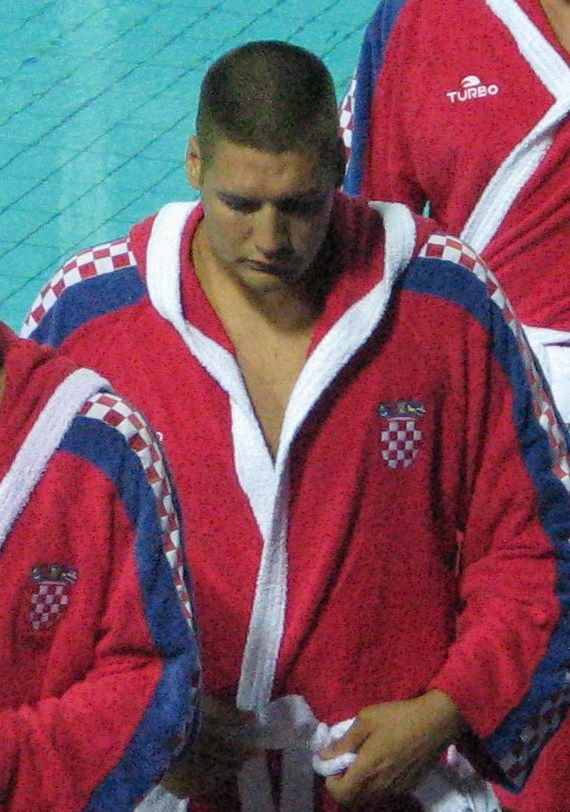

Personal information
- Nationality: Croatian
- Born: 4 January 1986 (age 40) Dubrovnik, SR Croatia, SFR Yugoslavia
- Height: 2.00 m (6 ft 7 in)
- Weight: 115 kg (254 lb)

Sport
- Sport: Water polo
- Handedness: Right
- Position: Centre back
- Current club: Olympiacos

Senior clubs
- Years: Team
- 2004–2015: Jug Dubrovnik
- 2015–2016: Posillipo
- 2016–2019: Olympiacos
- 2019–2020: Pro Recco
- 2020–2021: Mladost
- 2021–: Olympiacos
National team
- Years: Team
- 2005–2022: Croatia
Medal record
Men's water polo
Representing Croatia
Olympic Games
Gold medal – first place	2012 London	Team
Silver medal – second place	2016 Rio de Janeiro	Team
World Championship
Gold medal – first place	2007 Melbourne	Team
Gold medal – first place	2017 Budapest	Team
Silver medal – second place	2015 Kazan	Team
Bronze medal – third place	2009 Rome	Team
Bronze medal – third place	2011 Shanghai	Team
Bronze medal – third place	2013 Barcelona	Team
Bronze medal – third place	2019 Gwanjgu	Team
European Championship
Gold medal – first place	2010 Zagreb
Bronze medal – third place	2018 Barcelona
World Cup
Silver medal – second place	2010 Oradea
Bronze medal – third place	2014 Kazakhstan
FINA World League
Gold medal – first place	2012 Almaty
Silver medal – second place	2009 Podgorica
Silver medal – second place	2019 Belgrade
Silver medal – second place	2015 Bergamo
Bronze medal – third place	2010 Niš
Bronze medal – third place	2011 Florence
Bronze medal – third place	2017 Ruza
Mediterranean Games
Gold medal – first place	2013 Mersin	Team

Andro Bušlje (born 4 January 1986) is a Croatian water polo player who competed in the 2008 Summer Olympics, 2012 Summer Olympics and 2016 Summer Olympics. At the 2012 Summer Olympics he was part of the Croatian team that won the gold medal. He is right-handed and plays the center defender position. From 2016 to 2019 he played for Greek powerhouse Olympiacos, with whom he won the 2017–18 LEN Champions League. He started playing water polo at the age of 12, and he made his national team debut in 2005. Bušlje is one of the top defenders in the world.

Bušlje is currently the captain of the Croatia national team, with whom he has become Olympic gold medalist, 2 times World Champion and European Champion. He is the only water polo player in the world to have won 7 FINA World Championship medals (2 gold, 1 silver and 4 bronze), an all-time record as of 2017

Bušlje was given the honour to carry the national flag of Croatia at the closing ceremony of the 2020 Summer Olympics in Tokyo, becoming the 29th water polo player to be a flag bearer at the opening and closing ceremonies of the Olympics.

== Honours ==
=== Club ===
Jug Dubrovnik

- LEN Champions League: 2005–06; runners-up: 2006–07, 2007–08, 2012–13
- LEN Super Cup: 2006
- Croatian Championship: 2003–04, 2004–05, 2005–06, 2006–07, 2008–09, 2009–10, 2010–11, 2011–12, 2012–13
- Croatian Cup: 2003–04, 2004–05, 2006–07, 2007–08, 2008–09, 2009–10
- Adriatic League: 2008–09

Olympiacos

- LEN Champions League: 2017–18; runners-up: 2018–19
- Greek Championship: 2016–17, 2017–18, 2018–19, 2021–22, 2022–23, 2023–24
- Greek Cup: 2017–18, 2018–19, 2021–22, 2022–23, 2023–24
- Greek Super Cup: 2018

Mladost

- Croatian Championship: 2020–21
- Croatian Cup: 2020–21

=== Individual ===
- Member of the World Team by total-waterpolo 2017
- LEN Champions League Defender of the Year: 2017–18, 2018–19, 2024–25
- Croatian Water Polo Player of the Year: 2018
- Adriatic League Defender of the Year: 2008–09, 2009–10, 2010–11, 2011–12, 2013–14
- Serie A1 Defender of the Year: 2015–16
- Croatian Championship MVP: 2009–10, 2020–21
- Croatian Championship Defender of the Year: 2003–04, 2004–05, 2005–06, 2006–07, 2008–09, 2009–10, 2010–11, 2011–12, 2012–13, 2014–15, 2020–21
- Greek Championship Defender of the Year: 2016–17, 2017–18, 2018–19

== See also ==
- Croatia men's Olympic water polo team records and statistics
- List of Olympic champions in men's water polo
- List of Olympic medalists in water polo (men)
- List of flag bearers for Croatia at the Olympics
- List of world champions in men's water polo
- List of World Aquatics Championships medalists in water polo
- 2017–18 Croatian "Athlete of the Year "
- fifth best player in the world: 2018
- Croatian Championship MVP 2020–21

Sporting positions
Preceded by Sandro Sukno	Croatia captain 2017–	Succeeded by Incumbent
