= Tihomil Vranješ =

Croatian water polo player

Personal information
- Nationality: Croatia
- Born: 10 November 1977 (age 48) Dubrovnik
- Height: 1.89 m (6 ft 2 in)
- Weight: 87 kg (192 lb)

Sport
- Sport: Water polo
- Position: driver

Senior clubs
- Years: Team
- –: VK Jug Dubrovnik
- –: Olympiacos
National team
- Years: Team
- ?-?: Croatia
Medal record
European Championship
Silver medal – second place	2003 Kranj	Team competition

Tihomil Vranješ (born 10 November 1977) is a Croatian male water polo player. He was a member of the Croatia men's national water polo team, playing as a driver. He was a part of the team at the 2004 Summer Olympics. On club level he played most notably for VK Jug Dubrovnik in Croatia and Olympiacos in Greece.

== See also ==
- Croatia men's Olympic water polo team records and statistics
