= Damir Burić (water polo) =

Croatian water polo player

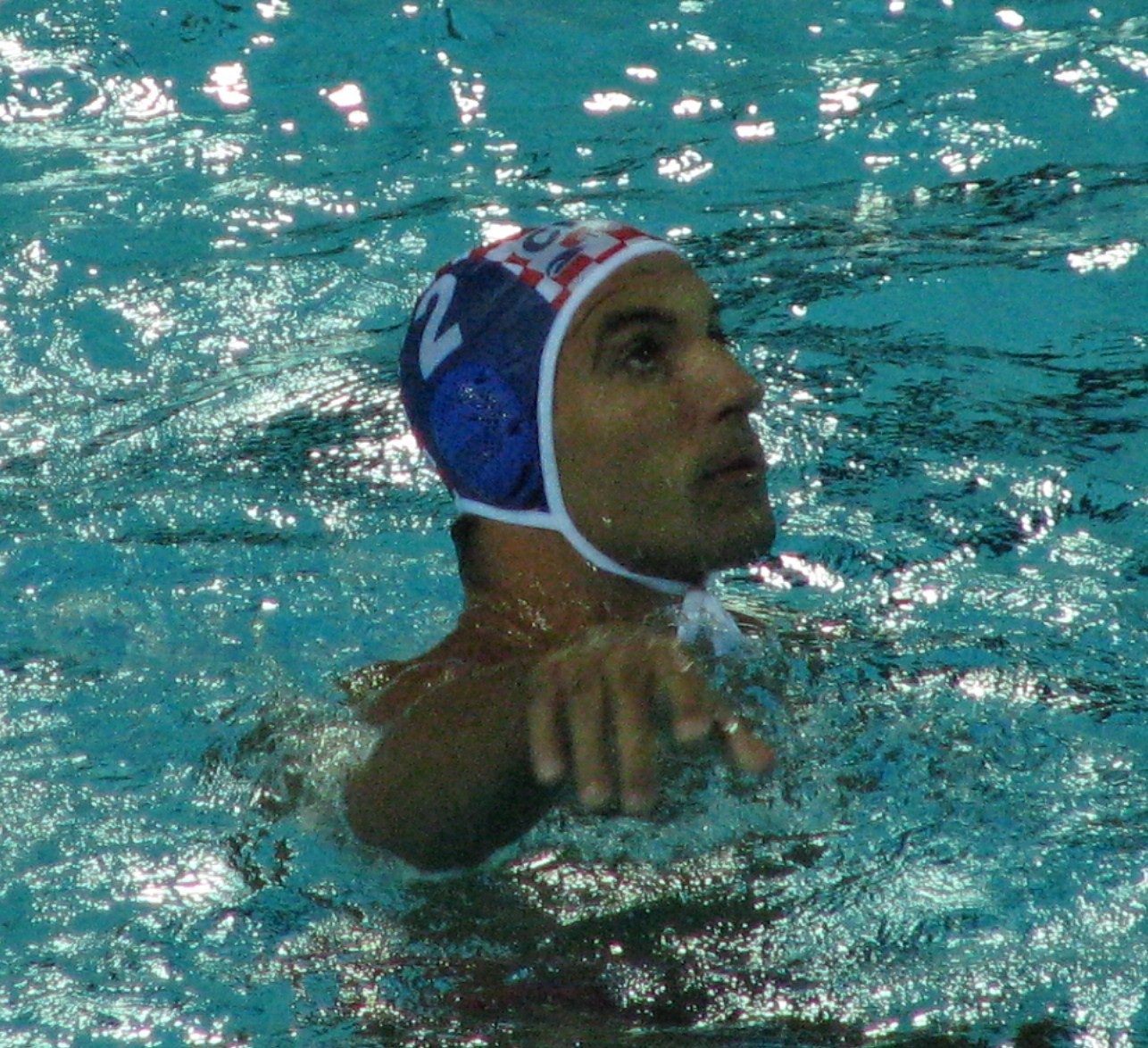

Personal information
- Nationality: Croatian
- Born: 2 December 1980 (age 45) Pula, SR Croatia, SFR Yugoslavia
- Height: 2.05 m (6 ft 9 in)
- Weight: 125 kg (276 lb)
- Spouse: Ivana

Sport
- Country: Croatia
- Sport: Water polo
Medal record
Olympic Games
Gold medal – first place	2012 London	Team
Silver medal – second place	2016 Rio de Janeiro	Team
World Championship
Gold medal – first place	2007 Melbourne	Team
Silver medal – second place	2015 Kazan	Team
Bronze medal – third place	2009 Rome	Team
Bronze medal – third place	2011 Shanghai	Team
European Championship
Gold medal – first place	2010 Zagreb
Silver medal – second place	2003 Kranj
World Cup
Silver medal – second place	2010 Oradea
FINA World League
Gold medal – first place	2012 Almaty
Silver medal – second place	2009 Podgorica
Bronze medal – third place	2010 Niš
Bronze medal – third place	2011 Florence

Damir Burić (born 2 December 1980) is a Croatian water polo player who competed in the 2004 Summer Olympics and in the 2008 Summer Olympics. At the 2012 Summer Olympics, he was part of the Croatian team that won the Olympic tournament. He has also been World champion and European champion.

== See also ==
- Croatia men's Olympic water polo team records and statistics
- List of Olympic champions in men's water polo
- List of Olympic medalists in water polo (men)
- List of players who have appeared in multiple men's Olympic water polo tournaments
- List of world champions in men's water polo
- List of World Aquatics Championships medalists in water polo
