= Croatia men's Olympic water polo team records and statistics =

This article lists various water polo records and statistics in relation to the Croatia men's national water polo team at the Summer Olympics.

The Croatia men's national water polo team has participated in 7 of 27 official men's water polo tournaments.

== Abbreviations ==
Apps	Appearances	Rk	Rank	Ref	Reference	Cap No.	Water polo cap number
Pos	Playing position	FP	Field player	GK	Goalkeeper	ISHOF	International Swimming Hall of Fame
L/R	Handedness	L	Left-handed	R	Right-handed	Oly debut	Olympic debut in water polo
(C)	Captain	p.	page	pp.	pages		

== Team statistics ==
=== Comprehensive results by tournament ===
Notes:

- Results of Olympic qualification tournaments are not included. Numbers refer to the final placing of each team at the respective Games.
- At the 1904 Summer Olympics, a water polo tournament was contested, but only American contestants participated. Currently the International Olympic Committee (IOC) and the International Swimming Federation (FINA) consider water polo event as part of unofficial program in 1904.
- Related team: Yugoslavia men's Olympic water polo team^{†} (statistics).
- Last updated: 5 May 2021.

Legend

- 1 – Champions
- 2 – Runners-up
- 3 – Third place
- 4 – Fourth place
- — – The nation did not participate in the Games
- Q – Qualified for forthcoming tournament
- Team^{†} – Defunct team

Men's team	00	04	08	12	20	24	28	32	36	48	52	56	60	64	68	72	76	80	84	88	92	96	00	04	08	12	16	20	24	Years
Croatia	—	—	—	—	Part of Yugoslavia																	2	7	10	6	1	2	5	2	8
Yugoslavia^{†}	—	—	—	—					10	9	2	2	4	2	1	5	5	2	1	1	Defunct									12
Total teams	7		4	6	12	13	14	5	16	18	21	10	16	13	15	16	12	12	12	12	12	12	12	12	12	12	12	12	12	

=== Number of appearances ===
Last updated: 18 June 2026.

Men's team	Apps	Record streak	Active streak	Debut	Most recent	Best finish	Confederation
Croatia	8	8	8	1996	2024	Champions	Europe – LEN

=== Best finishes ===
Last updated: 27 July 2021.

Men's team	Best finish	Apps	Confederation
Croatia	Champions (2012)	7	Europe – LEN

=== Finishes in the top four ===
Last updated: 18 June 2026.

Men's team	Total	Champions	Runners-up	Third place	Fourth place	First	Last
Croatia	3	1 (2012)	3 (1996, 2016, 2024)			1996	2024

=== Medal table ===
Last updated: 18 June 2026.

Men's team	Gold	Silver	Bronze	Total
Croatia (CRO)	1	3	0	4

== Player statistics ==
=== Multiple appearances ===
The following table is pre-sorted by number of Olympic appearances (in descending order), year of the last Olympic appearance (in ascending order), year of the first Olympic appearance (in ascending order), date of birth (in ascending order), name of the player (in ascending order), respectively.

- Number of six-time Olympians: 0
- Number of five-time Olympians: 2
- Number of four-time Olympians: 6
- Last updated: 27 July 2021.

Abbreviation

- CRO – Croatia
- ESP – Spain
- YUG – Yugoslavia

Male athletes who competed in water polo at four or more Olympics
Apps	Player	Birth	Pos	Water polo tournaments					Age of first/last	ISHOF member	Note	Ref
Apps	Player	Birth	Pos	1	2	3	4	5	Age of first/last	ISHOF member	Note	Ref
5	Igor Hinić	1975	FP	1996	2000	2004	2008	2012	20/36			
5	Xavier García	1984	FP	2004; ESP	2008; ESP	2012; ESP	2016; CRO	2020	20/37			
4	Dubravko Šimenc	1966	FP	1988; YUG		1996; CRO	2000; CRO	2004; CRO	21/37		Flag bearer for Croatia (2004)	
4	Samir Barać	1973	FP	2000	2004	2008	2012		26/38			
4	Frano Vićan	1976	GK	2000	2004	2008	2012		24/36			
4	Damir Burić	1980	FP	2004	2008	2012	2016		23/35			
4	Andro Bušlje	1986	FP	2008	2012	2016	2020		22/35		Flag bearer for Croatia (2020)	
4	Maro Joković	1987	FP	2008	2012	2016	2020		20/33			

=== Multiple medalists ===
The following table is pre-sorted by total number of Olympic medals (in descending order), number of Olympic gold medals (in descending order), number of Olympic silver medals (in descending order), year of receiving the last Olympic medal (in ascending order), year of receiving the first Olympic medal (in ascending order), name of the player (in ascending order), respectively.

- Number of four-time Olympic medalists: 0
- Number of three-time Olympic medalists: 1
- Last updated: 1 May 2021.

Abbreviation

- CRO – Croatia
- YUG – Yugoslavia

Male athletes who won three or more Olympic medals in water polo
Rk	Player	Birth	Height	Pos	Water polo tournaments					Period (age of first/last)	Medals				Ref
Rk	Player	Birth	Height	Pos	1	2	3	4	5	Period (age of first/last)	G	S	B	T	Ref
1	Perica Bukić	1966	1.98 m (6 ft 6 in)	FP	1984; YUG	1988; YUG		1996; CRO		12 years (18/30)	2	1	0	3	

=== Top goalscorers ===
The following table is pre-sorted by number of total goals (in descending order), year of the last Olympic appearance (in ascending order), year of the first Olympic appearance (in ascending order), name of the player (in ascending order), respectively.

- Number of goalscorers (50+ goals): 0
- Number of goalscorers (40–49 goals): 0
- Number of goalscorers (30–39 goals): 2
- Last updated: 1 April 2021.

Abbreviation

- CRO – Croatia
- YUG – Yugoslavia

Male players with 30 or more goals at the Olympics
Rk	Player	Birth	L/R	Total goals	Water polo tournaments (goals)					Age of first/last	ISHOF member	Note	Ref
Rk	Player	Birth	L/R	Total goals	1	2	3	4	5	Age of first/last	ISHOF member	Note	Ref
1	Sandro Sukno	1990	Right	31	2012 (14)	2016 (17)				22/26			
2	Dubravko Šimenc	1966	Right	30	1988; YUG (3)		1996; CRO (14)	2000; CRO (9)	2004; CRO (4)	21/37		Flag bearer for Croatia (2004)	

Sources:

- Official Reports (PDF): 1988, 1996;
- Official Results Books (PDF): 2000 (pp. 48, 51, 54, 79, 82, 86–87, 92), 2004 (pp. 191–192), 2008 (pp. 190–191), 2012 (pp. 471–472), 2016 (pp. 109–110).

=== Goalkeepers ===
The following table is pre-sorted by edition of the Olympics (in ascending order), cap number or name of the goalkeeper (in ascending order), respectively.

Last updated: 27 July 2021.

Abbreviation

- Eff % – Save efficiency (Saves / Shots)

Year	Cap No.	Goalkeeper	Birth	Age	Saves	Shots	Eff %	ISHOF member	Note	Ref
1996 (silver)	1	Siniša Školneković	1968	28	77	135	57.0%		Starting goalkeeper	
1996 (silver)	12	Maro Balić	1971	25	0	0	—			
2000	1	Siniša Školneković (2)	1968	32	33	70	47.1%			
2000	12	Frano Vićan	1976	24	23	42	54.8%			
2004	1	Frano Vićan (2)	1976	28	41	81	50.6%		Starting goalkeeper	
2004	5	Goran Volarević	1977	27	11	32	34.4%			
2008	1	Frano Vićan (3)	1976	32	49	94	52.1%		Starting goalkeeper	
2008	13	Josip Pavić	1982	26	5	9	55.6%			
2012 (gold)	1	Josip Pavić (2)	1982	30	85	121	70.2%		Starting goalkeeper	
2012 (gold)	13	Frano Vićan (4)	1976	36	10	16	62.5%			
2016 (silver)	1	Josip Pavić (3)	1982	34	24	45	53.3%		Flag bearer for Croatia	
2016 (silver)	13	Marko Bijač	1991	25	57	98	58.2%			
2020	1	Marko Bijač (2)	1991	30						
2020	13	Ivan Marcelić	1994	27						
Year	Cap No.	Goalkeeper	Birth	Age	Saves	Shots	Eff %	ISHOF member	Note	Ref

Sources:

- Official Reports (PDF): 1996 (pp. 62–66, 70, 72–73);
- Official Results Books (PDF): 2000 (pp. 48, 51, 54, 79, 82, 86–87, 92), 2004 (pp. 191–192), 2008 (pp. 190–191), 2012 (pp. 471–472), 2016 (pp. 109–110).

=== Top sprinters ===
The following table is pre-sorted by number of total sprints won (in descending order), year of the last Olympic appearance (in ascending order), year of the first Olympic appearance (in ascending order), name of the sprinter (in ascending order), respectively.

* Number of sprinters (30+ sprints won, since 2000): 0

- Number of sprinters (20–29 sprints won, since 2000): 1
- Number of sprinters (10–19 sprints won, since 2000): 2
- Number of sprinters (5–9 sprints won, since 2000): 4
- Last updated: 15 May 2021.

Abbreviation

- Eff % – Efficiency (Sprints won / Sprints contested)
- CRO – Croatia
- ESP – Spain

Male players with 5 or more sprints won at the Olympics (statistics since 2000)
Rk	Sprinter	Birth	Total sprints won	Total sprints contested	Eff %	Water polo tournaments (sprints won / contested)					Age of first/last	ISHOF member	Note	Ref
Rk	Sprinter	Birth	Total sprints won	Total sprints contested	Eff %	1	2	3	4	5	Age of first/last	ISHOF member	Note	Ref
1	Maro Joković	1987	25	36	69.4%	2008 (16/21)	2012 (7/13)	2016 (2/2)			20/28			
2	Xavier García	1984	14	28	50.0%	2004; ESP (5/12)	2008; ESP (7/11)	2012; ESP (1/4)	2016; CRO (1/1)		20/32			
2	Sandro Sukno	1990	14	19	73.7%	2012 (11/16)	2016 (3/3)				22/26			
4	Tihomil Vranješ	1977	9	24	37.5%	2004 (9/24)					26/26			
5	Anđelo Šetka	1985	8	14	57.1%	2016 (8/14)					30/30			
6	Samir Barać	1973	6	21	28.6%	2000 (5/19)	2004 (1/2)	2008 (0/0)	2012 (0/0)		26/38			
6	Luka Bukić	1994	6	12	50.0%	2016 (6/12)					22/22			

- Official Results Books (PDF): 2000 (pp. 48, 51, 54, 79, 82, 86–87, 92), 2004 (pp. 191–192), 2008 (pp. 190–191), 2012 (pp. 471–472), 2016 (pp. 109–110).

== Coach statistics ==
=== Medals as coach and player ===
The following table is pre-sorted by total number of Olympic medals (in descending order), number of Olympic gold medals (in descending order), number of Olympic silver medals (in descending order), year of winning the last Olympic medal (in ascending order), year of winning the first Olympic medal (in ascending order), name of the person (in ascending order), respectively. Last updated: 5 May 2021.

Ratko Rudić won a silver medal for Yugoslavia at the 1980 Summer Olympics. As a head coach, he led Croatia men's national water polo team to win an Olympic gold medal in 2012.

Rk	Person	Birth	Height	Player				Head coach			Total medals				Ref
Rk	Person	Birth	Height	Age	Men's team	Pos	Medal	Age	Men's team	Medal	G	S	B	T	Ref
1	Ratko Rudić	1948	1.88 m (6 ft 2 in)	32	Yugoslavia	FP	1980 (silver)	64	Croatia	2012 (gold)	1	1	0	2	

== Olympic champions ==
=== 2012 Summer Olympics ===
- Edition of men's tournament: 26th
- Host city: London, United Kingdom
- Number of participating teams: 12
- Competition format: Round-robin pools advanced teams to classification matches
- Champion: Croatia (1st title; 1st place in preliminary A group)

Results
Match	Round	Date	Cap color	Opponent	Result	Goals for	Goals against	Goal diff.
Match 1/8	Preliminary round – Group A	29 July 2012	Blue	Greece	Won	8	6	2
Match 2/8	Preliminary round – Group A	31 July 2012	White	Spain	Won	8	7	1
Match 3/8	Preliminary round – Group A	2 August 2012	Blue	Italy	Won	11	6	5
Match 4/8	Preliminary round – Group A	4 August 2012	White	Australia	Won	11	6	5
Match 5/8	Preliminary round – Group A	6 August 2012	Blue	Kazakhstan	Won	12	4	8
Match 6/8	Quarter-finals	8 August 2012	White	United States	Won	8	2	6
Match 7/8	Semi-finals	10 August 2012	White	Montenegro	Won	7	5	2
Match 8/8	Gold medal match	12 August 2012	White	Italy	Won	8	6	2
Total	Matches played: 8 • Wins: 8 • Ties: 0 • Defeats: 0 • Win %: 100%					73	42	31

Source: Official Results Books (PDF): 2012 (pp. 373, 391, 399, 415, 421, 433, 445, 455).

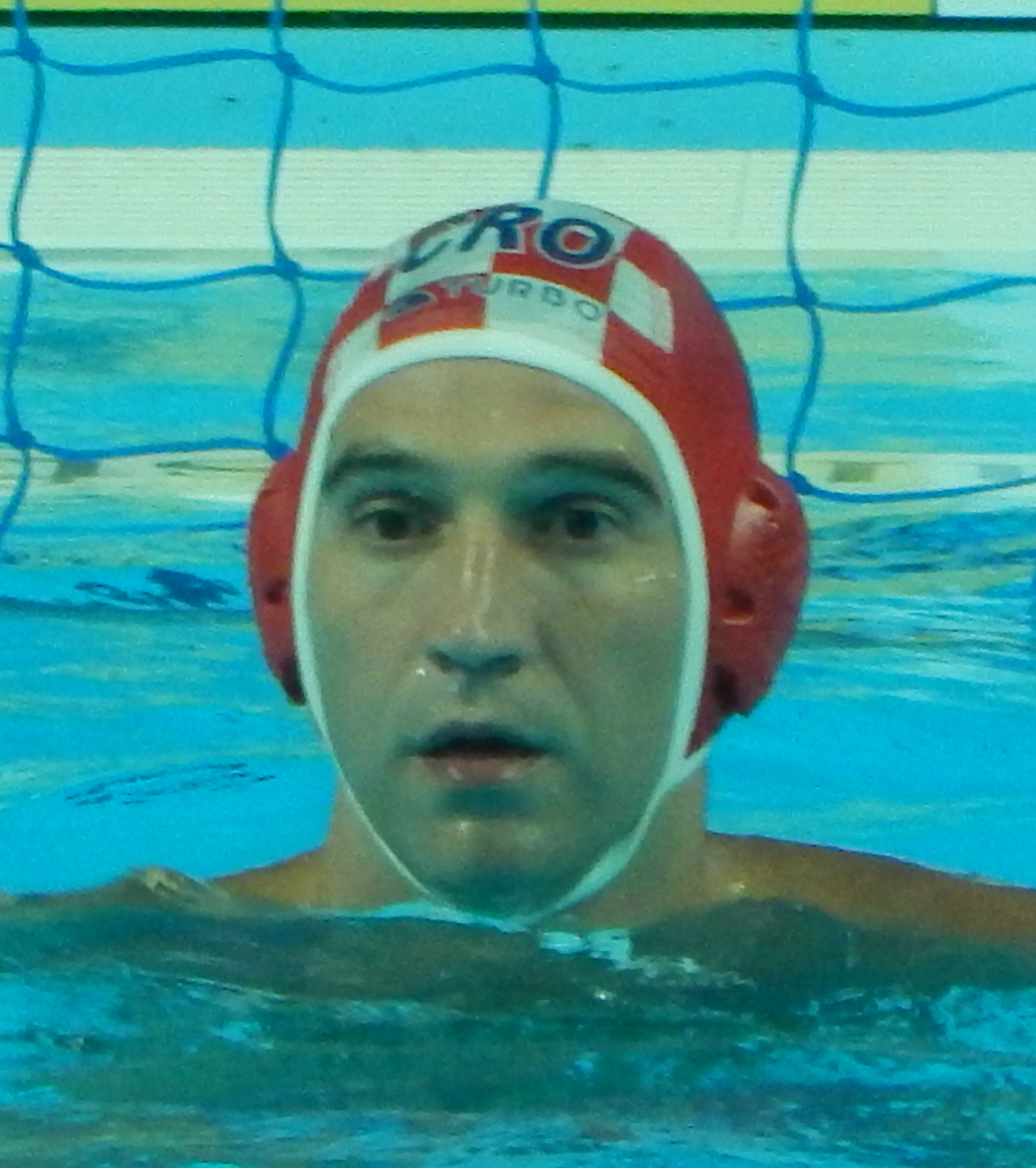
Josip Pavić saved 85 shots at the 2012 Games, helping Croatia win the Olympic title. He was named the Most Valuable Player of the men's water polo tournament.

- Head coach: (Croatia) Ratko Rudić (4th title as head coach)
- Assistant coaches: (Croatia) Elvis Fatović, (Croatia) Vjekoslav Kobešćak

Roster
Cap No.	Player	Pos	L/R	Height	Weight	Date of birth	Age of winning gold	Oly debut	ISHOF member
1	Josip Pavić	GK	R	1.95 m (6 ft 5 in)	90 kg (198 lb)	15 January 1982	30 years, 210 days	No	
2	Damir Burić	FP	R	2.05 m (6 ft 9 in)	115 kg (254 lb)	2 December 1980	31 years, 254 days	No	
3	Miho Bošković	FP	R	1.96 m (6 ft 5 in)	96 kg (212 lb)	11 January 1983	29 years, 214 days	No	
4	Nikša Dobud	FP	R	1.99 m (6 ft 6 in)	118 kg (260 lb)	5 August 1985	27 years, 7 days	Yes	
5	Maro Joković	FP	L	2.03 m (6 ft 8 in)	95 kg (209 lb)	1 October 1987	24 years, 316 days	No	
6	Ivan Buljubašić	FP	R	1.98 m (6 ft 6 in)	108 kg (238 lb)	31 October 1987	24 years, 286 days	Yes	
7	Petar Muslim	FP	R	2.00 m (6 ft 7 in)	102 kg (225 lb)	26 March 1988	24 years, 139 days	Yes	
8	Andro Bušlje	FP	R	2.00 m (6 ft 7 in)	115 kg (254 lb)	4 January 1986	26 years, 221 days	No	
9	Sandro Sukno	FP	R	2.00 m (6 ft 7 in)	93 kg (205 lb)	30 June 1990	22 years, 43 days	Yes	
10	Samir Barać (C)	FP	R	1.87 m (6 ft 2 in)	89 kg (196 lb)	2 November 1973	38 years, 284 days	No	
11	Igor Hinić	FP	R	2.02 m (6 ft 8 in)	110 kg (243 lb)	4 December 1975	36 years, 252 days	No	
12	Paulo Obradović	FP	R	1.90 m (6 ft 3 in)	100 kg (220 lb)	9 March 1986	26 years, 156 days	Yes	
13	Frano Vićan	GK	R	1.92 m (6 ft 4 in)	94 kg (207 lb)	24 January 1976	36 years, 201 days	No	
Average				1.97 m (6 ft 6 in)	102 kg (225 lb)	19 May 1983	29 years, 85 days		
Coach	Ratko Rudić			1.88 m (6 ft 2 in)		7 June 1948	64 years, 66 days		2007

Sources:

- Official Results Books (PDF): 2012 (p. 472);
- ISHOF.

Abbreviation

- MP – Matches played
- Min – Minutes
- G – Goals
- Sh – Shots
- AS – Assists
- TF – Turnover fouls
- ST – Steals
- BL – Blocked shots
- SP – Sprints
- 20S – 20 seconds exclusion
- DE – Double exclusion
- Pen – Penalty
- EX – Exclusion

Statistics
Cap No.	Player	Pos	MP	Minutes played		Goals/Shots			AS	TF	ST	BL	Sprints			Personal fouls			
Cap No.	Player	Pos	MP	Min	%	G	Sh	%	AS	TF	ST	BL	Won	SP	%	20S	DE	Pen	EX
1	Josip Pavić	GK	8	222	86.7%						4								
2	Damir Burić	FP	8	131	51.2%	5	14	35.7%	1	5	4	7				10		1	
3	Miho Bošković	FP	8	155	60.5%	15	33	45.5%	9	10	2		1	2	50.0%	7			1
4	Nikša Dobud	FP	8	149	58.2%	12	20	60.0%		29	2	5				6	1		
5	Maro Joković	FP	8	206	80.5%	8	25	32.0%	15	8	2	6	7	13	53.8%	4		1	
6	Ivan Buljubašić	FP	8	88	34.4%	3	16	18.8%	6		3					13			2
7	Petar Muslim	FP	8	118	46.1%	2	18	11.1%	5	11		2				4	1		
8	Andro Bušlje	FP	8	115	44.9%	3	13	23.1%	1	7	5	4				13		1	3
9	Sandro Sukno	FP	8	210	82.0%	14	30	46.7%	7	11	7	3	11	16	68.8%	7	1	1	1
10	Samir Barać (C)	FP	8	135	52.7%	4	15	26.7%	4	2	1	1				9			
11	Igor Hinić	FP	8	105	41.0%	2	8	25.0%	2	11	3	5				3	1	1	
12	Paulo Obradović	FP	8	124	48.4%	5	12	41.7%	4	7	2	4	0	1	0.0%	9	1		1
13	Frano Vićan	GK	8	34	13.3%				1										
Team										6									
Total			8	256	100%	73	204	35.8%	55	107	35	37	19	32	59.4%	85	5	5	8
Against						42	230	18.3%	31	86	55	19	13	32	40.6%	82	5	8	7

Cap No.	Player	Pos	Saves/Shots		
Cap No.	Player	Pos	Saves	Shots	%
1	Josip Pavić	GK	85	121	70.2%
13	Frano Vićan	GK	10	16	62.5%
Total			95	137	69.3%

Source: Official Results Books (PDF): 2012 (p. 471).

== Water polo people at the opening and closing ceremonies ==
=== Flag bearers ===
Some sportspeople were chosen to carry the national flag of their country at the opening and closing ceremonies of the Olympic Games. As of the 2020 Summer Olympics, three male water polo players were given the honour to carry the flag for Croatia.

Legend

- 2008 O – Opening ceremony of the 2008 Summer Olympics
- 2012 C – Closing ceremony of the 2012 Summer Olympics
- Flag bearer^{‡} – Flag bearer who won the tournament with his team

Water polo people who were flag bearers at the opening and closing ceremonies of the Olympic Games
#	Year	Country	Flag bearer	Birth	Age	Height	Team	Pos	Water polo tournaments					Period (age of first/last)	Medals				Ref
#	Year	Country	Flag bearer	Birth	Age	Height	Team	Pos	1	2	3	4	5	Period (age of first/last)	G	S	B	T	Ref
1	1996 O	Croatia	Perica Bukić	1966	30	1.98 m (6 ft 6 in)	Yugoslavia	FP	1984	1988				12 years (18/30)	2	1	0	3	
1	1996 O	Croatia	Perica Bukić	1966	30	1.98 m (6 ft 6 in)	Croatia	FP				1996		12 years (18/30)	2	1	0	3	
2	2004 O	Croatia	Dubravko Šimenc	1966	37	2.01 m (6 ft 7 in)	Yugoslavia	FP	1988					16 years (21/37)	1	1	0	2	
2	2004 O	Croatia	Dubravko Šimenc	1966	37	2.01 m (6 ft 7 in)	Croatia	FP			1996	2000	2004	16 years (21/37)	1	1	0	2	
3	2016 O	Croatia	Josip Pavić	1982	34	1.95 m (6 ft 5 in)	Croatia	GK	2008	2012	2016			8 years (26/34)	1	1	0	2	

== See also ==
- Yugoslavia men's Olympic water polo team records and statistics
- List of men's Olympic water polo tournament records and statistics
- Lists of Olympic water polo records and statistics
- Croatia at the Olympics

== Sources ==
=== Official Reports (IOC) ===
PDF documents in the LA84 Foundation Digital Library:

- Official Report of the 1896 Olympic Games (download, archive)
- Official Report of the 1900 Olympic Games (download, archive)
- Official Report of the 1904 Olympic Games (download, archive)
- Official Report of the 1908 Olympic Games (download, archive) (pp. 359–361)
- Official Report of the 1912 Olympic Games (download, archive) (pp. 1021–1024, 1031–1037)
- Official Report of the 1920 Olympic Games (download, archive) (p. 130)
- Official Report of the 1924 Olympic Games (download, archive) (pp. 439–440, 486–494)
- Official Report of the 1928 Olympic Games (download, archive) (pp. 746–757, 797–807)
- Official Report of the 1932 Olympic Games (download, archive) (pp. 619–623, 646–652)
- Official Report of the 1936 Olympic Games, v.2 (download, archive) (pp. 345–356)
- Official Report of the 1948 Olympic Games (download, archive) (pp. 537–540, 640–647)
- Official Report of the 1952 Olympic Games (download, archive) (pp. 600–608)
- Official Report of the 1956 Olympic Games (download, archive) (pp. 592–594, 624–627)
- Official Report of the 1960 Olympic Games (download, archive) (pp. 552–555, 617–634)
- Official Report of the 1964 Olympic Games, v.2 (download, archive) (pp. 682–698)
- Official Report of the 1968 Olympic Games, v.3 (download, archive) (pp. 449–466, 811–826)
- Official Report of the 1972 Olympic Games, v.3 (download, archive) (pp. 331, 353–365)
- Official Report of the 1976 Olympic Games, v.3 (download, archive) (pp. 446–447, 484–497)
- Official Report of the 1980 Olympic Games, v.3 (download, archive) (pp. 458, 495–510)
- Official Report of the 1984 Olympic Games, v.2 (download, archive) (pp. 528–534)
- Official Report of the 1988 Olympic Games, v.2 (download, archive) (pp. 590–598)
- Official Report of the 1992 Olympic Games, v.5 (download, archive) (pp. 354, 386–400)
- Official Report of the 1996 Olympic Games, v.3 (download, archive) (pp. 56–73)

=== Official Results Books (IOC) ===
PDF documents in the LA84 Foundation Digital Library:

- Official Results Book – 2000 Olympic Games – Water Polo (download, archive)
- Official Results Book – 2004 Olympic Games – Water Polo (download, archive)
- Official Results Book – 2008 Olympic Games – Water Polo (download, archive)

PDF documents on the FINA website:

- Official Results Book – 2012 Olympic Games – Diving, Swimming, Synchronised Swimming, Water Polo (archive) (pp. 284–507)

PDF documents in the Olympic World Library:

- Official Results Book – 2016 Olympic Games – Water Polo (archive)

PDF documents on the International Olympic Committee website:

- Official Results Book – 2020 Olympic Games – Water Polo (archive)
- Official Results Book – 2024 Olympic Games – Water Polo

=== Official Reports (FINA) ===
PDF documents on the FINA website:

- HistoFINA – Water polo medalists and statistics (as of September 2019) (archive) (pp. 4–13)
- 1870–2020 | 150 years of Water Polo – Evolution of its rules (archive)

=== Official website (IOC) ===
Water polo on the International Olympic Committee website:

- Water polo
- Men's water polo

=== Olympedia ===
Water polo on the Olympedia website:

- Water polo Archived 2021-12-28 at the Wayback Machine
- Men's water polo
- Athlete count for water polo
- Water polo venues
- Water polo at the 1900 Summer Olympics (men's tournament)
- Water polo at the 1904 Summer Olympics (men's tournament)
- Water polo at the 1908 Summer Olympics (men's tournament)
- Water polo at the 1912 Summer Olympics (men's tournament)
- Water polo at the 1920 Summer Olympics (men's tournament)
- Water polo at the 1924 Summer Olympics (men's tournament)
- Water polo at the 1928 Summer Olympics (men's tournament)
- Water polo at the 1932 Summer Olympics (men's tournament)
- Water polo at the 1936 Summer Olympics (men's tournament)
- Water polo at the 1948 Summer Olympics (men's tournament)
- Water polo at the 1952 Summer Olympics (men's tournament)
- Water polo at the 1956 Summer Olympics (men's tournament)
- Water polo at the 1960 Summer Olympics (men's tournament)
- Water polo at the 1964 Summer Olympics (men's tournament)
- Water polo at the 1968 Summer Olympics (men's tournament)
- Water polo at the 1972 Summer Olympics (men's tournament)
- Water polo at the 1976 Summer Olympics (men's tournament)
- Water polo at the 1980 Summer Olympics (men's tournament)
- Water polo at the 1984 Summer Olympics (men's tournament)
- Water polo at the 1988 Summer Olympics (men's tournament)
- Water polo at the 1992 Summer Olympics (men's tournament)
- Water polo at the 1996 Summer Olympics (men's tournament)
- Water polo at the 2000 Summer Olympics (men's tournament)
- Water polo at the 2004 Summer Olympics (men's tournament)
- Water polo at the 2008 Summer Olympics (men's tournament)
- Water polo at the 2012 Summer Olympics (men's tournament)
- Water polo at the 2016 Summer Olympics (men's tournament)
- Water polo at the 2020 Summer Olympics (men's tournament)

=== Sports Reference ===
Water polo on the Sports Reference website:

- Country Medal Leaders & Athlete Medal Leaders (1900–2016) (archived)
- Men's water polo (1900–2016) (archived)
- Water polo at the 1900 Summer Games (men's tournament) (archived)
- Water polo at the 1904 Summer Games (men's tournament) (archived)
- Water polo at the 1908 Summer Games (men's tournament) (archived)
- Water polo at the 1912 Summer Games (men's tournament) (archived)
- Water polo at the 1920 Summer Games (men's tournament) (archived)
- Water polo at the 1924 Summer Games (men's tournament) (archived)
- Water polo at the 1928 Summer Games (men's tournament) (archived)
- Water polo at the 1932 Summer Games (men's tournament) (archived)
- Water polo at the 1936 Summer Games (men's tournament) (archived)
- Water polo at the 1948 Summer Games (men's tournament) (archived)
- Water polo at the 1952 Summer Games (men's tournament) (archived)
- Water polo at the 1956 Summer Games (men's tournament) (archived)
- Water polo at the 1960 Summer Games (men's tournament) (archived)
- Water polo at the 1964 Summer Games (men's tournament) (archived)
- Water polo at the 1968 Summer Games (men's tournament) (archived)
- Water polo at the 1972 Summer Games (men's tournament) (archived)
- Water polo at the 1976 Summer Games (men's tournament) (archived)
- Water polo at the 1980 Summer Games (men's tournament) (archived)
- Water polo at the 1984 Summer Games (men's tournament) (archived)
- Water polo at the 1988 Summer Games (men's tournament) (archived)
- Water polo at the 1992 Summer Games (men's tournament) (archived)
- Water polo at the 1996 Summer Games (men's tournament) (archived)
- Water polo at the 2000 Summer Games (men's tournament) (archived)
- Water polo at the 2004 Summer Games (men's tournament) (archived)
- Water polo at the 2008 Summer Games (men's tournament) (archived)
- Water polo at the 2012 Summer Games (men's tournament) (archived)
- Water polo at the 2016 Summer Games (men's tournament) (archived)
- Water polo at the 2020 Summer Games (men's tournament) (archived)

=== Todor66 ===
Water polo on the Todor66 website:

- Water polo at the Summer Games
- Water polo at the 1900 Summer Olympics (men's tournament)
- Water polo at the 1904 Summer Olympics (men's tournament)
- Water polo at the 1908 Summer Olympics (men's tournament)
- Water polo at the 1912 Summer Olympics (men's tournament)
- Water polo at the 1920 Summer Olympics (men's tournament)
- Water polo at the 1924 Summer Olympics (men's tournament)
- Water polo at the 1928 Summer Olympics (men's tournament)
- Water polo at the 1932 Summer Olympics (men's tournament)
- Water polo at the 1936 Summer Olympics (men's tournament)
- Water polo at the 1948 Summer Olympics (men's tournament)
- Water polo at the 1952 Summer Olympics (men's tournament)
- Water polo at the 1956 Summer Olympics (men's tournament)
- Water polo at the 1960 Summer Olympics (men's tournament)
- Water polo at the 1964 Summer Olympics (men's tournament)
- Water polo at the 1968 Summer Olympics (men's tournament, men's qualification)
- Water polo at the 1972 Summer Olympics (men's tournament, men's qualification)
- Water polo at the 1976 Summer Olympics (men's tournament, men's European qualification)
- Water polo at the 1980 Summer Olympics (men's tournament, men's European qualification, men's world qualification)
- Water polo at the 1984 Summer Olympics (men's tournament, men's qualification)
- Water polo at the 1988 Summer Olympics (men's tournament, men's qualification)
- Water polo at the 1992 Summer Olympics (men's tournament, men's qualification)
- Water polo at the 1996 Summer Olympics (men's tournament, men's qualification)
- Water polo at the 2000 Summer Olympics (men's tournament, men's qualification)
- Water polo at the 2004 Summer Olympics (men's tournament, men's qualification)
- Water polo at the 2008 Summer Olympics (men's tournament, men's qualification)
- Water polo at the 2012 Summer Olympics (men's tournament, men's qualification)
- Water polo at the 2016 Summer Olympics (men's tournament, men's qualification)
- Water polo at the 2020 Summer Olympics (men's tournament, men's qualification)
- Water polo at the 2024 Summer Olympics (men's tournament, men's qualification)

=== ISHOF ===
International Swimming Hall of Fame (ISHOF) website:

- Honorees Listed by Category – Water Polo
- Honorees Listed by Category – Coaches
- Honorees Listed by Category – Contributors
- Honorees by Country
- Honorees By Last Name
