= Water polo at the 2007 World Aquatics Championships – Men's tournament =

Tournament details
- Venue(s): Australia (in Melbourne host cities)
- Dates: 19 March – 1 April
- Teams: 16 (from 5 confederations)

Final positions
- Champions: Croatia (1st title)
- Runners-up: Hungary
- Third place: Spain
- Fourth place: Serbia

Tournament statistics
- Matches played: 48
- Goals scored: 943 (19.65 per match)
- Top scorer(s): (United States) Anthony Azevedo (19 goals)

Awards
- Best player: (Spain) Guillermo Molina

The men's water polo tournament at the 2007 World Aquatics Championships, organised by the FINA, was held in Melbourne, Australia from 19 March to 1 April 2007.

The men's tournament was won by Croatia who won all of their matches and beat Hungary 9–8 in the final game.

== Participating teams ==
Africa	Americas	Asia	Europe	Oceania
South Africa	Canada; United States	China; Japan	Croatia; Germany; Greece; Hungary; Italy; Romania; Russia; Serbia; Spain	Australia; New Zealand

=== Groups formed ===
Group A

- Germany
- Italy
- Japan
- Serbia

Group B

- Australia
- Croatia
- South Africa
- United States

Group C

- China
- Greece
- Russia
- Spain

Group D

- Canada
- Hungary
- New Zealand
- Romania

== Preliminary round ==
Qualified for the quarterfinals
Qualified for the playoff round
Will play for places 13–16

=== Group A ===
Team	Pld	W	D	L	GF	GA	GDIF	Points
Serbia	3	3	0	0	35	13	+22	6
Italy	3	2	0	1	31	15	+16	4
Germany	3	1	0	2	27	26	+1	2
Japan	3	0	0	3	16	55	-39	0

20 March 2007
Japan	6 – 20	Italy	09:00 AEDT
Germany	7 – 11	Serbia	11:40 AEDT
22 March 2007
Japan	7 – 17	Germany	10:20 AEDT
Serbia	6 – 3	Italy	13:00 AEDT
24 March 2007
Japan	3 – 18	Serbia	09:00 AEDT
Germany	3 – 8	Italy	13:00 AEDT

=== Group B ===
Team	Pld	W	D	L	GF	GA	GDIF	Points
Croatia	3	3	0	0	43	30	+13	6
(United States) USA	3	2	0	1	39	27	+12	4
Australia	3	1	0	2	24	25	-1	2
South Africa	3	0	0	3	15	39	-24	0

20 March 2007
Croatia	13 – 5	South Africa	10:20 AEDT
Australia	3 – 9	USA	21:00 AEDT
22 March 2007
USA	14 – 4	South Africa	11:40 AEDT
Croatia	10 – 9	Australia	21:00 AEDT
24 March 2007
Croatia	10 – 8	USA	11:40 AEDT
Australia	12 – 6	South Africa	21:00 AEDT

=== Group C ===
Team	Pld	W	D	L	GF	GA	GDIF	Points
Spain	3	3	0	0	35	19	+16	6
Greece	3	2	0	1	28	20	+8	4
(Russia) Russian Federation	3	1	0	2	26	28	-2	2
China	3	0	0	3	15	37	-22	0

20 March 2007
China	4 – 15	Spain	13:00 AEDT
Greece	10 – 7	Russia	17:00 AEDT
22 March 2007
Russia	8 – 12	Spain	17:00 AEDT
China	5 – 11	Greece	18:20 AEDT
24 March 2007
China	6 – 11	Russia	10:20 AEDT
Greece	7 – 8	Spain	17:00 AEDT

=== Group D ===
Team	Pld	W	D	L	GF	GA	GDIF	Points
Hungary	3	3	0	0	51	17	+34	6
Canada	3	2	0	1	24	35	-11	4
Romania	3	1	0	2	35	24	+11	2
New Zealand	3	0	0	3	17	51	-34	0

20 March 2007
Canada	9 – 8	Romania	18:20 AEDT
Hungary	21 – 5	New Zealand	19:40 AEDT
22 March 2007
New Zealand	4 – 18	Romania	09:00 AEDT
Canada	3 – 19	Hungary	19:40 AEDT
24 March 2007
Canada	12 – 8	New Zealand	18:20 AEDT
Hungary	11 – 9	Romania	19:40 AEDT

== Final round ==
=== Finals ===
Play-off; 26 March 2007
Greece	8
Romania	7
(Russia) Russian Fed.	17
Canada	13
Italy	12
Australia	11
Germany	6
(United States) USA	3

Quarterfinals; 28 March 2007
Serbia	8
Greece	3
Croatia	13
(Russia) Russian Fed.	3
Spain	7
Italy	5
Hungary	13
Germany	6

Semifinals; 30 March 2007
Serbia	7
Croatia	10
Spain	11
Hungary (AET)	12

Final; 1 April 2007
Croatia (AET)	9
Hungary	8
Third place
Spain (pen)	18
Serbia	17

=== 5th-8th place ===
5th-8th place
30 March 2007 – 11:40 AEST
Greece	9
(Russia) Russian Fed.	8
30 March 2007 – 16:00 AEST
Italy	6
Germany	5

5th/6th place
1 April 2007 – 10:20 AEST
Greece	15
Italy (pen)	16
7th/8th place
1 April 2007 – 09:00 AEST
(Russia) Russian Fed.	11
Germany	8

=== 9th-12th place ===
9th-12th place
28 March 2007 – 21:00 AEST
Australia	15
Romania	9
28 March 2007 – 11:40 AEST
(United States) USA	16
Canada	11

9th/10th place
30 March 2007 – 10:20 AEST
Australia	9
(United States) USA	10
11th/12th place
30 March 2007 – 09:00 AEST
Romania	15
Canada	13

=== 13th-16th place ===
13th-16th place
26 March 2007 – 09:00 AEST
Japan	7
South Africa	9
26 March 2007 – 10:20 AEST
People's Republic of China	11
New Zealand	8

13th/14th place
28 March 2007 – 10:20 AEST
South Africa	12
People's Republic of China	13
15th/16th place
28 March 2007 – 09:00 AEST
Japan	9
New Zealand	10

== Final ranking ==
Gold medal	Croatia
Silver medal	Hungary
Bronze medal	Spain
4	Serbia
5	Italy
6	Greece
7	Russia
8	Germany
9	United States
10	Australia
11	Romania
12	Canada
13	China
14	South Africa
15	New Zealand
16	Japan

2007 FINA Men's World champions

Croatia
First title

Team Roster

Samir Barać, Miho Bošković, Damir Burić, Andro Bušlje, Teo Đogaš, Maro Joković, Igor Hinić, Maro Joković, Aljoša Kunac, Pavo Marković, Josip Pavić, Mile Smodlaka, Frano Vićan, and Zdeslav Vrdoljak
Head coach: Ratko Rudić

== Medalists ==
Gold	Silver	Bronze
Croatia Samir Barač; Miho Bošković; Damir Burić; Andro Bušlje; Teo Đogaš; Igor Hinić; Maro Joković; Aljoša Kunac; Pavo Marković; Josip Pavić; Mile Smodlaka; Frano Vićan; Zdeslav Vrdoljak (c) Head coach Ratko Rudić	Hungary Tibor Benedek (c); Péter Biros; Rajmund Fodor; Tamás Kásás; Gábor Kis; Gergely Kiss; Norbert Madaras; Tamás Molnár; Viktor Nagy; Zoltán Szécsi; Márton Szivós; Dániel Varga; Dénes Varga Head coach Dénes Kemény	Spain Iñaki Aguilar; Ángel Andreo; Iván Gallego; Mario García; Xavier García; David Martín; Marc Minguell; Guillermo Molina; Iván Pérez (c); Felipe Perrone; Ricardo Perrone; Svilen Piralkov; Xavier Vallès Head coach Rafael Aguilar

Croatia, Hungary and Spain qualified for the 2008 Summer Olympics in Beijing, PR China

== Individual awards ==
- Most Valuable Player

- Guillermo Molina (ESP)

- Best Goalkeeper

- Alexander Tchigir (GER)

- Topscorer

- Anthony Azevedo (USA) — 19 goals
