= Goran Volarević =

Croatian-Italian water polo player

Goran Volarevic
Personal information
- Nationality: Croatia
- Born: 2 April 1977 (age 49) Pula, Croatia
- Height: 1.89 m (6 ft 2 in)
- Weight: 91 kg (201 lb)

Sport
- Sport: Water polo
- Position: goalkeeper

Senior clubs
- Years: Team
- VK Jug Dubrovnik
- RN Savona
National team
- Years: Team
- ?-? 2012: Croatia
Medal record
Representing Croatia
European Championships
| Silver medal – second place | 2003 Kranj | Team competition |

Goran Volarević (born 2 April 1977) is a Croatian and Italian male water polo player. He was a member of the Croatia men's national water polo team, playing as a goalkeeper. He was a part of the team at the 2004 Summer Olympics. On club level he played for VK Jug Dubrovnik in Croatia.

== See also ==
- Croatia men's Olympic water polo team records and statistics
- List of men's Olympic water polo tournament goalkeepers
- List of sportspeople who competed for more than one nation
