= Maro Balić =

Croatian water polo player (born 1971)

Personal information
- Born: 5 June 1971 (age 55) Dubrovnik, Yugoslavia
- Height: 189 cm (6 ft 2 in)
- Weight: 86 kg (190 lb)

Sport
- Sport: Water polo
Medal record
Representing Croatia
Olympic Games
Silver medal – second place	1996 Atlanta	Team

Maro Balić (born 5 June 1971) is a retired water polo player from Croatia, who was a member of the national team that won the silver medal at the 1996 Summer Olympics in Atlanta, Georgia.

== See also ==
- Croatia men's Olympic water polo team records and statistics
- List of Olympic medalists in water polo (men)
- List of men's Olympic water polo tournament goalkeepers
