= Zdeslav Vrdoljak =

Croatian water polo player

Personal information
- Born: 15 March 1971 (age 55) Split, Yugoslavia
- Height: 189 cm (6 ft 2 in)
- Weight: 96 kg (212 lb)

Sport
- Sport: Water polo
Medal record
Representing Croatia
Olympic Games
Silver medal – second place	1996 Atlanta	Team competition
World Championship
Gold medal – first place	2007 Melbourne	Team competition

Zdeslav Vrdoljak (born 15 March 1971) is a water polo player from Croatia, who was a member of the national team that won the silver medal at the 1996 Summer Olympics in Atlanta, Georgia.

== See also ==
- List of Olympic medalists in water polo (men)
- List of world champions in men's water polo
- List of World Aquatics Championships medalists in water polo
