= Frano Vićan =

Croatian water polo player

Personal information
- Born: 24 January 1976 (age 50) Dubrovnik, Yugoslavia

Sport
- Sport: Water polo
Medal record
Representing Croatia
Olympic Games
Gold medal – first place	2012 London	Team competition
World Championship
Gold medal – first place	2007 Melbourne	Team competition
European Championship
Gold medal – first place	2010 Zagreb	Team competition
Silver medal – second place	1999 Florence	Team competition
Silver medal – second place	2003 Kranj	Team competition

Frano Vićan (born 24 January 1976 in Dubrovnik) is a Croatian water polo player who competed in the 2000 Summer Olympics, in the 2004 Summer Olympics, and in the 2008 Summer Olympics. He was also a member of Croatia's gold medal-winning team at the 2012 Summer Olympics.

== See also ==
- Croatia men's Olympic water polo team records and statistics
- List of Olympic champions in men's water polo
- List of Olympic medalists in water polo (men)
- List of players who have appeared in multiple men's Olympic water polo tournaments
- List of men's Olympic water polo tournament goalkeepers
- List of world champions in men's water polo
- List of World Aquatics Championships medalists in water polo
