= Pavo Marković =

Croatian water polo player

Personal information
- Born: 20 April 1985 (age 41) Dubrovnik, Yugoslavia

Sport
- Sport: Water polo
Medal record
Representing Croatia
World Championship
Gold medal – first place	2007 Melbourne	Team competition

Pavo Marković (born 20 April 1985) is a Croatian water polo player who competed in the 2008 Summer Olympics.

== See also ==
- List of world champions in men's water polo
- List of World Aquatics Championships medalists in water polo
