= Samir Barać =

Croatian water polo player (born 1973)

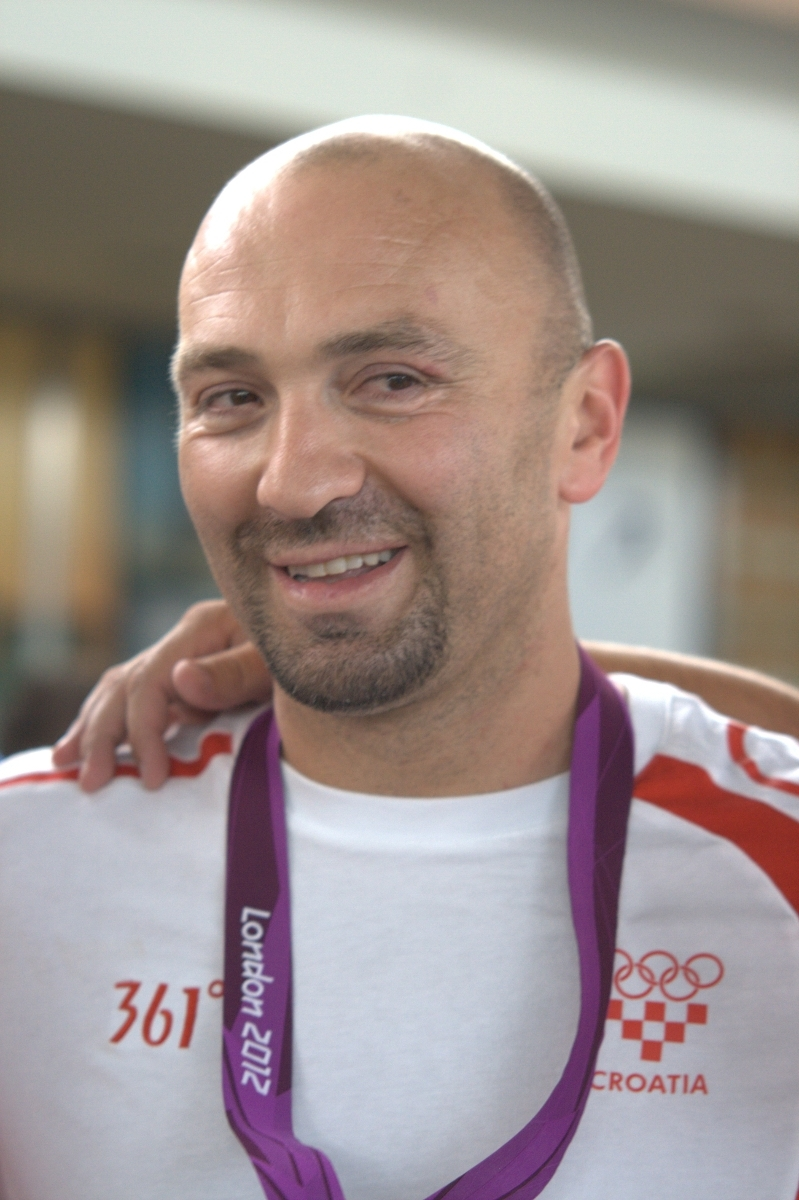
- Barać at 2012 Summer Olympics

Personal information
- Born: November 2, 1973 (age 52) Rijeka, Yugoslavia

Sport
- Sport: Water polo
Medal record
Representing Croatia
Olympic Games
Gold medal – first place	2012 London	Team
World Championship
Gold medal – first place	2007 Melbourne	Team competition
Bronze medal – third place	2009 Rome	Team competition
Bronze medal – third place	2011 Shanghai	Team competition
European Championship
Gold medal – first place	2010 Zagreb	Team competition
Silver medal – second place	1999 Florence	Team competition
Silver medal – second place	2003 Kranj	Team competition
World Cup
Silver medal – second place	2010 Oradea	Team competition
FINA World League
Gold medal – first place	2012 Almaty	Team competition
Silver medal – second place	2009 Podgorica	Team competition
Bronze medal – third place	2011 Florence	Team competition

Samir Barać (born 2 November 1973) is a Croatian water polo player who competed in the 2000, 2004, 2008, and 2012 Summer Olympics. As team captain, he was part of the Croatian team that won the gold medal in 2012. He played for VK Primorje Rijeka, POŠK Split, HAVK Mladost Zagreb and Brescia.

== See also ==
- Croatia men's Olympic water polo team records and statistics
- List of Olympic champions in men's water polo
- List of Olympic medalists in water polo (men)
- List of players who have appeared in multiple men's Olympic water polo tournaments
- List of world champions in men's water polo
- List of World Aquatics Championships medalists in water polo
