= Water polo at the 2013 Mediterranean Games – Men's tournament =

Men's water polo at the 2013 Mediterranean Games
Tournament details
- Host country: Turkey
- Venue: 1 (in 1 host city)
- Dates: 19–25 June
- Teams: 7 (from 1 confederation)

Final positions
- Champions: Croatia
- Runners-up: Spain
- Third place: Greece
- Fourth place: Italy

Tournament statistics
- Matches played: 15
- Goals scored: 232 (15.47 per match)

The men's tournament of water polo at the 2013 Mediterranean Games in Mersin, Turkey, were held between June 19 and June 25. All games were held at the Mersin University, Çiftlikköy Campus Swimming Pool.

== Format ==
- Seven teams are divided into two preliminary groups. One group consists three teams and the other four teams.
- The top 2 teams from each group will qualify for Semifinals, other teams will qualify for the placement matches.
- Winners of the Semifinals contested the gold medal game and the losers the bronze medal game.

== Preliminary round ==
All times are Eastern European Summer Time (UTC+3).

Qualified for the semifinals

=== Group A ===
Team	Pld	W	D	L	GF	GA	GD	Pts
Greece	3	3	0	0	32	14	+18	6
Italy	3	2	0	1	26	19	+7	4
France	3	1	0	2	19	24	−5	2
Serbia	3	0	0	3	11	31	−20	0

June 19, 2013; 16:30	Report	Greece	12–3	Serbia	Çiftlikköy Campus Swimming Pool, Mersin; Referees: Matache (ROU) and Kokarağaç (TUR)
June 19, 2013; 16:30	Report	Score by quarters: 3–1, 1–1, 4–0, 4–1			Çiftlikköy Campus Swimming Pool, Mersin; Referees: Matache (ROU) and Kokarağaç (TUR)
June 19, 2013; 16:30	Report	Fountoulis 4	Goals	three players 1	Çiftlikköy Campus Swimming Pool, Mersin; Referees: Matache (ROU) and Kokarağaç (TUR)

June 19, 2013; 18:00	Report	Italy	9–6	France	Çiftlikköy Campus Swimming Pool, Mersin; Referees: Vlašić (CRO) and Colominas (ESP)
June 19, 2013; 18:00	Report	Score by quarters: 1–0, 2–2, 3–1, 3–3			Çiftlikköy Campus Swimming Pool, Mersin; Referees: Vlašić (CRO) and Colominas (ESP)
June 19, 2013; 18:00	Report	three players 2	Goals	Marzouki, Camarasa 2	Çiftlikköy Campus Swimming Pool, Mersin; Referees: Vlašić (CRO) and Colominas (ESP)

June 21, 2013; 16:30	Report	Greece	12–6	France	Çiftlikköy Campus Swimming Pool, Mersin; Referees: Gideon (NED) and Vlašić (CRO)
June 21, 2013; 16:30	Report	Score by quarters: 1–1, 3–1, 4–1, 4–2			Çiftlikköy Campus Swimming Pool, Mersin; Referees: Gideon (NED) and Vlašić (CRO)
June 21, 2013; 16:30	Report	Fountoulis 4	Goals	Simon 4	Çiftlikköy Campus Swimming Pool, Mersin; Referees: Gideon (NED) and Vlašić (CRO)

June 21, 2013; 18:00	Report	Serbia	5–12	Italy	Çiftlikköy Campus Swimming Pool, Mersin; Referees: Matache (ROU) and Colominas (ESP)
June 21, 2013; 18:00	Report	Score by quarters: 2–5, 2–2, 0–3, 1–2			Çiftlikköy Campus Swimming Pool, Mersin; Referees: Matache (ROU) and Colominas (ESP)
June 21, 2013; 18:00	Report	Tanasković, Rašović 2	Goals	Giorgetti 3	Çiftlikköy Campus Swimming Pool, Mersin; Referees: Matache (ROU) and Colominas (ESP)

June 22, 2013; 16:30	Report	Greece	8–5	Italy	Çiftlikköy Campus Swimming Pool, Mersin; Referees: Matache (ROU) and Colominas (ESP)
June 22, 2013; 16:30	Report	Score by quarters: 3–0, 2–3, 2–1, 1–1			Çiftlikköy Campus Swimming Pool, Mersin; Referees: Matache (ROU) and Colominas (ESP)
June 22, 2013; 16:30	Report	Fountoulis, Mourikis 2	Goals	Gallo 2	Çiftlikköy Campus Swimming Pool, Mersin; Referees: Matache (ROU) and Colominas (ESP)

June 22, 2013; 18:00	Report	France	7–3	Serbia	Çiftlikköy Campus Swimming Pool, Mersin; Referees: Kokarağaç (TUR) and Reemnet (NED)
June 22, 2013; 18:00	Report	Score by quarters: 1–1, 0–2, 3–0, 3–0			Çiftlikköy Campus Swimming Pool, Mersin; Referees: Kokarağaç (TUR) and Reemnet (NED)
June 22, 2013; 18:00	Report	Simon 3	Goals	three players 1	Çiftlikköy Campus Swimming Pool, Mersin; Referees: Kokarağaç (TUR) and Reemnet (NED)

=== Group B ===
Team	Pld	W	D	L	GF	GA	GD	Pts
Croatia	2	2	0	0	25	11	+14	4
Spain	2	1	0	1	20	11	+9	2
Turkey	2	0	0	2	7	30	−23	0

June 19, 2013; 19:30	Report	Croatia	8–7	Spain	Çiftlikköy Campus Swimming Pool, Mersin; Referees: Reemnet (NED) and Collantoni (ITA)
June 19, 2013; 19:30	Report	Score by quarters: 3–0, 2–2, 3–1, 0–4			Çiftlikköy Campus Swimming Pool, Mersin; Referees: Reemnet (NED) and Collantoni (ITA)
June 19, 2013; 19:30	Report	Obradović 3	Goals	Alarcón, Español 2	Çiftlikköy Campus Swimming Pool, Mersin; Referees: Reemnet (NED) and Collantoni (ITA)

June 21, 2013; 19:30	Report	Turkey	3–13	Spain	Çiftlikköy Campus Swimming Pool, Mersin; Referees: Mišković (SRB) and Collantoni (ITA)
June 21, 2013; 19:30	Report	Score by quarters: 1–3, 1–4, 0–3, 1–3			Çiftlikköy Campus Swimming Pool, Mersin; Referees: Mišković (SRB) and Collantoni (ITA)
June 21, 2013; 19:30	Report	three players 1	Goals	Español, Cercols 3	Çiftlikköy Campus Swimming Pool, Mersin; Referees: Mišković (SRB) and Collantoni (ITA)

June 22, 2013; 19:30	Report	Turkey	4–17	Croatia	Çiftlikköy Campus Swimming Pool, Mersin; Referees: Mišković (SRB) and Collantoni (ITA)
June 22, 2013; 19:30	Report	Score by quarters: 1–5, 1–6, 1–4, 1–2			Çiftlikköy Campus Swimming Pool, Mersin; Referees: Mišković (SRB) and Collantoni (ITA)
June 22, 2013; 19:30	Report	Hantal 2	Goals	Muslim 5	Çiftlikköy Campus Swimming Pool, Mersin; Referees: Mišković (SRB) and Collantoni (ITA)

== Elimination stage ==
=== Classification 5–7 bracket ===
Crossover		Fifth place
		Serbia	3
Serbia	9	France	6
Turkey	8

==== Crossover ====
June 23, 2013; 16:30	Report	Serbia	9–8 (OT)	Turkey	Çiftlikköy Campus Swimming Pool, Mersin; Referees: Reemnet (NED) and Collantoni (ITA)
June 23, 2013; 16:30	Report	Score by quarters: 1–1, 0–2, 2–3, 5–2 OT: (0–0, 1–0)			Çiftlikköy Campus Swimming Pool, Mersin; Referees: Reemnet (NED) and Collantoni (ITA)
June 23, 2013; 16:30	Report	Stojanović 3	Goals	Šutalo 4	Çiftlikköy Campus Swimming Pool, Mersin; Referees: Reemnet (NED) and Collantoni (ITA)

==== Fifth place match ====
June 25, 2013; 16:30	Report	Serbia	3–6	France	Çiftlikköy Campus Swimming Pool, Mersin; Referees: Reemnet (NED) and Vlašić (CRO)
June 25, 2013; 16:30	Report	Score by quarters: 0–0, 0–1, 2–3, 1–3			Çiftlikköy Campus Swimming Pool, Mersin; Referees: Reemnet (NED) and Vlašić (CRO)
June 25, 2013; 16:30	Report	Rašović 2	Goals	Khasz 2	Çiftlikköy Campus Swimming Pool, Mersin; Referees: Reemnet (NED) and Vlašić (CRO)

=== Championship bracket ===
Semi-finals
June 23
Greece	7
Spain	10
June 23
Croatia	7
Italy	5

Final
June 25
Spain	9
Croatia	11
Third place
June 25
Greece	9
Italy	8

==== Semifinals ====
June 23, 2013; 18:00	Report	Greece	7–10	Spain	Çiftlikköy Campus Swimming Pool, Mersin; Referees: Matache (ROU) and Vlašić (CRO)
June 23, 2013; 18:00	Report	Score by quarters: 1–1, 2–1, 3–5, 1–3			Çiftlikköy Campus Swimming Pool, Mersin; Referees: Matache (ROU) and Vlašić (CRO)
June 23, 2013; 18:00	Report	Fountoulis 3	Goals	Español 3	Çiftlikköy Campus Swimming Pool, Mersin; Referees: Matache (ROU) and Vlašić (CRO)

June 23, 2013; 19:30	Report	Croatia	7–5	Italy	Çiftlikköy Campus Swimming Pool, Mersin; Referees: Kokarağaç (TUR) and Mišković (SRB)
June 23, 2013; 19:30	Report	Score by quarters: 2–2, 2–2, 0–1, 3–0			Çiftlikköy Campus Swimming Pool, Mersin; Referees: Kokarağaç (TUR) and Mišković (SRB)
June 23, 2013; 19:30	Report	Bušlje, Obradović 2	Goals	Giorgetti, Figlioli 2	Çiftlikköy Campus Swimming Pool, Mersin; Referees: Kokarağaç (TUR) and Mišković (SRB)

==== Bronze medal match ====
June 25, 2013; 18:00	Report	Greece	9–8	Italy	Çiftlikköy Campus Swimming Pool, Mersin; Referees: Reemnet (NED) and Colominas (ESP)
June 25, 2013; 18:00	Report	Score by quarters: 1–3, 3–3, 4–1, 1–1			Çiftlikköy Campus Swimming Pool, Mersin; Referees: Reemnet (NED) and Colominas (ESP)
June 25, 2013; 18:00	Report	Fountoulis, Mourikis 2	Goals	three players 2	Çiftlikköy Campus Swimming Pool, Mersin; Referees: Reemnet (NED) and Colominas (ESP)

==== Gold medal match ====
June 25, 2013; 19:30	Report	Spain	9–11	Croatia	Çiftlikköy Campus Swimming Pool, Mersin; Referees: Matache (ROU) and Collantoni (ITA)
June 25, 2013; 19:30	Report	Score by quarters: 3–2, 2–4, 3–3, 1–2			Çiftlikköy Campus Swimming Pool, Mersin; Referees: Matache (ROU) and Collantoni (ITA)
June 25, 2013; 19:30	Report	Español, Mallarach 2	Goals	Sukno 4	Çiftlikköy Campus Swimming Pool, Mersin; Referees: Matache (ROU) and Collantoni (ITA)

== Final standings ==
Rank	Team	Record
Gold medal	Croatia	4–0
Silver medal	Spain	2–2
Bronze medal	Greece	4–1
4	Italy	2–3
5	France	2–2
6	Serbia	1–4
7	Turkey	0–3
