= 2010 FINA Men's Water Polo World Cup =

- League: FINA Water Polo World Cup
- Sport: Water polo
- Duration: 1 – 4 August

Super Final

FINA Water Polo World Cup seasons
- ← 2006 2014 →

The 14th edition of the Men's FINA Water Polo World Cup was held in Oradea, Romania from July 27 to August 1, 2010.

== Format ==
8 teams qualified for the 2010 FINA World Cup. They were split into two groups of 4 teams. After playing a Round-robin every team advanced to the quarterfinals. The best ranked team of Group A played against the fourth ranked team of Group B, the second ranked team of Group A against the third ranked team of Group B the third ranked team of Group A against the second ranked team of Group B and the fourth ranked team of Group A against the best ranked team of Group B. The winners of those quarterfinals advanced to the Semis and played out the champion while the losers of the quarterfinals competed in placement matches.

== Teams ==
The top eight teams from the previous world championship are no longer qualified. Now only the top three teams from the previous world championship qualify, with one guest per continent (the highest-ranked team from the previous world championship).

Teams	Qualified as
Romania; Serbia; Spain; Croatia (European Host); United States; Australia; China (South Africa); Iran	Host (7th 2009 World Championship); 1st 2009 World Championship; 2nd 2009 World Championship; 3rd 2009 World Championship; 1st European team at 2009 World Championship; 1st American team at 2009 World Championship; 1st Oceanian team at 2009 World Championship; 1st Asian team at 2009 World Championship; 1st African team at 2009 World Championship replace South Africa withdrawn

== Groups ==
Group A	Group B
Spain; Romania (H); Australia; Iran	Serbia; Croatia; United States; China

== Preliminary round ==
All times are EEST (UTC+3)

=== Group A ===
	Team	G	W	D	L	GF	GA	Diff	Points	Qualification
1.	Spain	3	3	0	0	49	16	+33	6	Quarter-finals
2.	Romania (H)	3	2	0	1	45	24	+21	4	Quarter-finals
3.	Australia	3	1	0	2	42	24	+18	2	Quarter-finals
4.	Iran	3	0	0	3	6	78	−72	0	Quarter-finals

27 July 2010; 17:00	Report	Iran	1–26	Romania	Referees: Jianguo (CHN), Cabral (BRA)
27 July 2010; 17:00	Report	Score by quarters: 0–8, 0–8, 0–6, 1–4			Referees: Jianguo (CHN), Cabral (BRA)
27 July 2010; 17:00	Report	Jafari 1	Goals	Georgescu 5	Referees: Jianguo (CHN), Cabral (BRA)

27 July 2010; 20:00	Report	Australia	7–9	Spain	Referees: Štampalija (CRO), Goldenberg (USA)
27 July 2010; 20:00	Report	Score by quarters: 4–2, 1–3, 0–1, 2–3			Referees: Štampalija (CRO), Goldenberg (USA)
27 July 2010; 20:00	Report	McGregor 3	Goals	Molina, Perrone 3	Referees: Štampalija (CRO), Goldenberg (USA)

28 July 2010; 17:00	Report	Australia	9–11	Romania	Referees: Ćirić (SRB), Koganov (AZE)
28 July 2010; 17:00	Report	Score by quarters: 3–1, 3–4, 1–2, 2–4			Referees: Ćirić (SRB), Koganov (AZE)
28 July 2010; 17:00	Report	Miller 3	Goals	Redu, Kádár 3	Referees: Ćirić (SRB), Koganov (AZE)

28 July 2010; 20:00	Report	Iran	1–26	Spain	Referees: Cabral (BRA), Štampalija (CRO)
28 July 2010; 20:00	Report	Score by quarters: 0–6, 0–7, 1–5, 0–8			Referees: Cabral (BRA), Štampalija (CRO)
28 July 2010; 20:00	Report	Jafari 1	Goals	Garcia 5	Referees: Cabral (BRA), Štampalija (CRO)

29 July 2010; 17:00	Report	Romania	8–14	Spain	Referees: Ćirić (SRB), Koganov (AZE)
29 July 2010; 17:00	Report	Score by quarters: 1–1, 2–4, 3–6, 2–3			Referees: Ćirić (SRB), Koganov (AZE)
29 July 2010; 17:00	Report	Iosep, Georgescu 2	Goals	Minguell, García 3	Referees: Ćirić (SRB), Koganov (AZE)

29 July 2010; 20:00	Report	Iran	4–26	Australia
29 July 2010; 20:00	Report	Score by quarters: 0-6, 1-3, 3-8, 0-9
29 July 2010; 20:00	Report	Kouhi 2	Goals	Campbell, Younger, Miller 4

=== Group B ===
	Team	G	W	D	L	GF	GA	Diff	Points	Qualification
1.	Croatia	3	3	0	0	33	19	+14	6	Quarter-finals
2.	Serbia	3	2	0	1	40	27	+13	4	Quarter-finals
3.	United States	3	1	0	2	26	32	−6	2	Quarter-finals
4.	China	3	0	0	3	18	39	−21	0	Quarter-finals

27 July 2010; 15:00	Report	United States	10–6	China	Referees: Alexandrescu (ROU), Hafezi (IRN)
27 July 2010; 15:00	Report	Score by quarters: 1–0, 3–3, 3–1, 3–2			Referees: Alexandrescu (ROU), Hafezi (IRN)
27 July 2010; 15:00	Report	Sharf, Hopkins, Hutten 2	Goals	Tan Feihu 2	Referees: Alexandrescu (ROU), Hafezi (IRN)

27 July 2010; 18:30	Report	Croatia	10–8	Serbia	Referees: Shaydakov (RUS), Koganov (AZE)
27 July 2010; 18:30	Report	Score by quarters: 2–2, 1–1, 3–2, 4–3			Referees: Shaydakov (RUS), Koganov (AZE)
27 July 2010; 18:30	Report	Sukno 4	Goals	Udovičić, Filipović 2	Referees: Shaydakov (RUS), Koganov (AZE)

28 July 2010; 15:00	Report	Croatia	14–4	China	Referees: Hart (AUS), Hafezi (IRN)
28 July 2010; 15:00	Report	Score by quarters: 3–1, 4–1, 2–0, 5–2			Referees: Hart (AUS), Hafezi (IRN)
28 July 2010; 15:00	Report	Dobud 4	Goals	Liang 3	Referees: Hart (AUS), Hafezi (IRN)

28 July 2010; 18:30	Report	United States	9–17	Serbia	Referees: Moliner (ESP), Shaydakov (RUS)
28 July 2010; 18:30	Report	Score by quarters: 1–3, 1–3, 1–4, 6–7			Referees: Moliner (ESP), Shaydakov (RUS)
28 July 2010; 18:30	Report	Sharf, Azevedo 2	Goals	Udovičić 5	Referees: Moliner (ESP), Shaydakov (RUS)

29 July 2010; 15:00	Report	China	8–15	Serbia	Referees: Moliner (ESP), Hart (AUS)
29 July 2010; 15:00	Report	Score by quarters: 2–1, 0–4, 2–6, 4–4			Referees: Moliner (ESP), Hart (AUS)
29 July 2010; 15:00	Report	Liang 2	Goals	Udovičić, Vapenski, Nikić, Aleksić, Filipović, Mitrović 2	Referees: Moliner (ESP), Hart (AUS)

29 July 2010; 18:30	Report	United States	7–9	Croatia	Referees: Shaydakov (RUS), Alexandrescu (ROU)
29 July 2010; 18:30	Report	Score by quarters: 1-2, 1-2, 1-3, 4-2			Referees: Shaydakov (RUS), Alexandrescu (ROU)
29 July 2010; 18:30	Report	Hopkins, Bailey 2	Goals	Joković, Sukno 3	Referees: Shaydakov (RUS), Alexandrescu (ROU)

== Knockout round ==
=== Championship ===
Quarter-finals
July 30 – Oradea
Spain	11
China	5
July 30 – Oradea
Australia	9
Serbia	12
July 30 – Oradea
Iran	2
Croatia	23
July 30 – Oradea
Romania	12
United States	14

Semi-finals
July 31 – Oradea
Spain	10
Serbia	12
July 31 – Oradea
Croatia	11
United States	9

Final
August 1 – Oradea
Serbia	13
Croatia	7
Third place
August 1 – Oradea
Spain	12
United States	8

==== Quarterfinals ====
All times are EEST (UTC+3)

30 July 2010; 15:30	Report	Australia	9–12	Serbia	Referees: Alexandrescu (ROU), Cabral (BRA)
30 July 2010; 15:30	Report	Score by quarters: 2–3, 2–4, 2–3, 3–2			Referees: Alexandrescu (ROU), Cabral (BRA)
30 July 2010; 15:30	Report	Younger, Howden 2	Goals	Aleksić 3	Referees: Alexandrescu (ROU), Cabral (BRA)

30 July 2010; 17:00	Report	Romania	12–14	United States	Referees: Moliner (ESP), Shaydakov (RUS)
30 July 2010; 17:00	Report	Score by quarters: 1–1, 4–4, 4–4, 3–5			Referees: Moliner (ESP), Shaydakov (RUS)
30 July 2010; 17:00	Report	Negrean 4	Goals	Azevedo, Bailey, Hutten 3	Referees: Moliner (ESP), Shaydakov (RUS)

30 July 2010; 18:30	Report	Spain	11–5	China	Referees: Hafezi (IRI), Hart (AUS)
30 July 2010; 18:30	Report	Score by quarters: 1–2, 5–1, 2–0, 3–2			Referees: Hafezi (IRI), Hart (AUS)
30 July 2010; 18:30	Report	Molina, Español, Vallès, García 2	Goals	Tan, Liang, Pan, Wang, Han 1	Referees: Hafezi (IRI), Hart (AUS)

30 July 2010; 20:00	Report	Iran	2–23	Croatia	Referees: Jianguo (CHN), Koganov (AZE)
30 July 2010; 20:00	Report	Score by quarters: 0–6, 1–8, 0–5, 1–4			Referees: Jianguo (CHN), Koganov (AZE)
30 July 2010; 20:00	Report	Mirmehdi, Soltani 1	Goals	Bošković, Sukno 4	Referees: Jianguo (CHN), Koganov (AZE)

==== Semifinals ====
All times are EEST (UTC+3)

31 July 2010; 18:30	Report	United States	9–11	Croatia	Referees: Alexandrescu (ROU), Hart (AUS)
31 July 2010; 18:30	Report	Score by quarters: 1–3, 2–3, 4–2, 2–3			Referees: Alexandrescu (ROU), Hart (AUS)
31 July 2010; 18:30	Report	Azevedo, Bailey 3	Goals	Bošković 4	Referees: Alexandrescu (ROU), Hart (AUS)

31 July 2010; 20:00	Report	Serbia	12–10	Spain	Referees: Koganov (AZE), Cabral (BRA)
31 July 2010; 20:00	Report	Score by quarters: 4–4, 3–3, 4–3, 1–0			Referees: Koganov (AZE), Cabral (BRA)
31 July 2010; 20:00	Report	Prlainović 4	Goals	García 3	Referees: Koganov (AZE), Cabral (BRA)

==== Bronze medal match ====
All times are EEST (UTC+3)

1 August 2010; 16:00	Report	United States	8–12	Spain	Referees: Hart (AUS), Alexandrescu (ROU)
1 August 2010; 16:00	Report	Score by quarters: 1–3, 3–3, 1–2, 3–4			Referees: Hart (AUS), Alexandrescu (ROU)
1 August 2010; 16:00	Report	Powers 2	Goals	García 4	Referees: Hart (AUS), Alexandrescu (ROU)

==== Final ====
All times are EEST (UTC+3)

1 August 2010; 17:30	Report	Croatia	7–13	Serbia	Referees: Goldenberg (USA), Koganov (AZE)
1 August 2010; 17:30	Report	Score by quarters: 0–4, 3–2, 3–5, 1–2			Referees: Goldenberg (USA), Koganov (AZE)
1 August 2010; 17:30	Report	Sukno 3	Goals	Gocić, Udovičić, Filipović 3	Referees: Goldenberg (USA), Koganov (AZE)

=== 5th–8th playoffs ===
Semi-finals
July 31 – Oradea
China	6
Australia	10
July 31 – Oradea
Iran	6
Romania	24

Fifth place
August 1 – Oradea
Australia	5
Romania	9
Seventh place
August 1 – Oradea
China	20
Iran	5

==== 5th–8th semifinals ====
All times are EEST (UTC+3)

31 July 2010; 15:30	Report	Australia	10–6	China	Referees: Goldenberg (USA), Hafezi (IRI)
31 July 2010; 15:30	Report	Score by quarters: 4–1, 2–2, 1–2, 3–1			Referees: Goldenberg (USA), Hafezi (IRI)
31 July 2010; 15:30	Report	Campbell, Younger, McGregor 2	Goals	Pan 2	Referees: Goldenberg (USA), Hafezi (IRI)

31 July 2010; 17:00	Report	Romania	24–6	Iran	Referees: Štampalija (CRO), Ćirić (SRB)
31 July 2010; 17:00	Report	Score by quarters: 4–1, 8–3, 9–1, 3–1			Referees: Štampalija (CRO), Ćirić (SRB)
31 July 2010; 17:00	Report	Negrean 6	Goals	Mardani, Mirmehdi, Jafari 2	Referees: Štampalija (CRO), Ćirić (SRB)

==== 7th place playoff ====
All times are EEST (UTC+3)

1 August 2010; 10:00	Report	China	20–5	Iran	Referees: Cabral (BRA), Ćirić (SRB)
1 August 2010; 10:00	Report	Score by quarters: 5–0, 6–2, 4–1, 5–2			Referees: Cabral (BRA), Ćirić (SRB)
1 August 2010; 10:00	Report	Junliang 4	Goals	Karami, Pirouzkhah 2	Referees: Cabral (BRA), Ćirić (SRB)

==== 5th place playoff ====
All times are EEST (UTC+3)

1 August 2010; 11:30	Report	Australia	5–9	Romania	Referees: Moliner (ESP), Štampalija (CRO)
1 August 2010; 11:30	Report	Score by quarters: 1–1, 1–3, 2–2, 1–3			Referees: Moliner (ESP), Štampalija (CRO)
1 August 2010; 11:30	Report	McGregor 3	Goals	Iosep 3	Referees: Moliner (ESP), Štampalija (CRO)

== Final standings ==
RANK	TEAM
	Serbia
	Croatia
	Spain
4.	United States
5.	Romania
6.	Australia
7.	China
8.	Iran

2010 Men's FINA Water Polo World Cup

Serbia
Second title

Team roster

1. Slobodan Soro (GK), 2. Marko Avramović, 3. Živko Gocić, 4. Vanja Udovičić, 5. Boris Vapenski, 6. Duško Pijetlović, 7. Slobodan Nikić, 8. Milan Aleksić, 9. Miloš Miličić, 10. Filip Filipović, 11. Andrija Prlainović, 12. Stefan Mitrović, and 13. Gojko Pijetlović (GK). Head coach: Dejan Udovičić.

- Serbia, Croatia, Spain, United States and Romania qualified for the 2011 World Aquatics Championships.

== Individual awards ==
- Best Player
  - Vanja Udovičić (SRB)
- Best Goalkeeper
  - Slobodan Soro (SRB)
- Best Scorer
  - Sandro Sukno (CRO) — 17 goals
