= 2017 Croatian Water Polo Cup =

2017 Kup Hrvatske
Tournament details
- Country: Croatia
- Date: 1–17 December 2017
- Teams: 10

Final positions
- Champions: Jug CO (13th title)
- Runners-up: Jadran Split

The 2017 Croatian Cup is the 26th edition of the tournament.

== Schedule ==
The rounds of the 2017 competition are scheduled as follows:

Round	Draw date and time	Matches
Preliminary round	11 November 2017	1–3 December 2017
Final four	3 December 2017	16–17 December 2017

== Preliminary round ==
The first round ties are scheduled for 1 and 3 December 2017.

=== Group A ===
Tournament will be played at Bazen u Gružu, Dubrovnik.

Team	Pld	W	D	L	GF	GA	GD	Pts
Jug CO	4	4	0	0	65	20	+45	12
Jadran Split	4	3	0	1	52	25	+27	9
Primorje EB	4	2	0	2	31	43	−12	6
Medveščak	4	1	0	3	33	46	−13	3
Jadran Kostrena	4	0	0	4	23	70	−47	0

=== Group B ===
Tournament will be played at Bazen Crnica, Šibenik.

Team	Pld	W	D	L	GF	GA	GD	Pts
Mornar BS	4	4	0	0	43	29	+14	12
OVK POŠK	4	3	0	1	46	31	+15	9
HAVK Mladost	4	2	0	2	56	29	+27	6
Solaris	4	1	0	3	24	46	−22	3
Zadar 1952	4	0	0	4	27	61	−34	0

== Final four ==
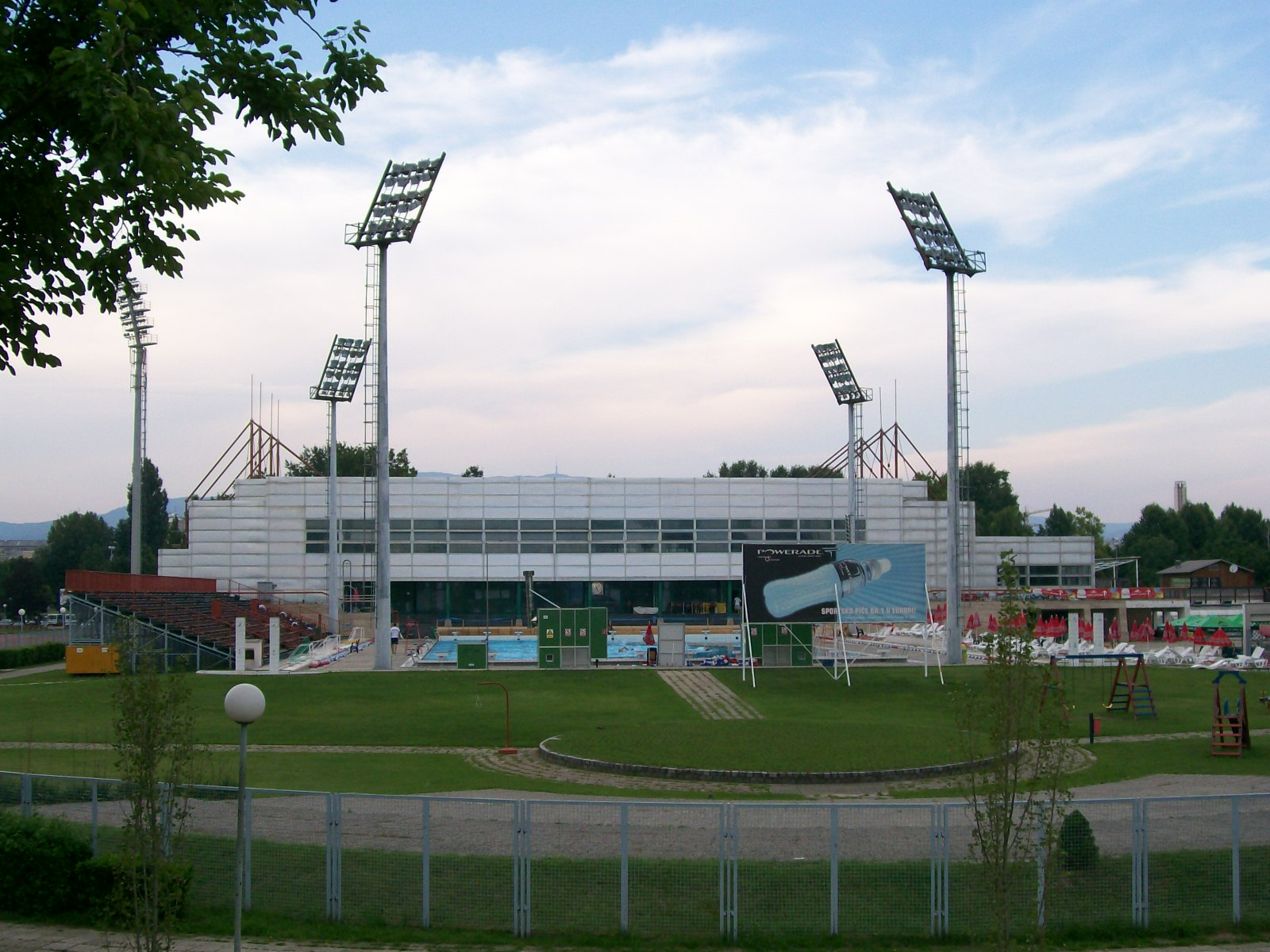
Sports Park Mladost, Zagreb

The final four will be held on 16 and 17 December 2017 at the Sports Park Mladost in Zagreb.

Semi-finals
16 December, 18:15
Jug CO	18
OVK POŠK	6
16 December, 16:45
Mornar BS	7
Jadran Split	9

Final
17 December, 16:00
Jug CO	11
Jadran Split	4

=== Semi-finals ===
16 December 2017; 18:15 (CET)	Report	Jug Croatia osiguranje	18–6	OVK POŠK	Bazen na Savi, Zagreb; Attendance: 350; Referees: Copić, Bura
16 December 2017; 18:15 (CET)	Report	Score by quarters: 5–1, 5–2, 6–2, 2–1			Bazen na Savi, Zagreb; Attendance: 350; Referees: Copić, Bura
16 December 2017; 18:15 (CET)	Report	seven players 2	Goals	six players 1	Bazen na Savi, Zagreb; Attendance: 350; Referees: Copić, Bura

16 December 2017; 16:45 (CET)	Report	Mornar Brodospas	7–9	Jadran Split	Bazen na Savi, Zagreb; Attendance: 250; Referees: Štampalija, Matijević
16 December 2017; 16:45 (CET)	Report	Score by quarters: 1–2, 3–3, 1–2, 2–2			Bazen na Savi, Zagreb; Attendance: 250; Referees: Štampalija, Matijević
16 December 2017; 16:45 (CET)	Report	Goreta 3	Goals	Krapić, Marelja 2	Bazen na Savi, Zagreb; Attendance: 250; Referees: Štampalija, Matijević

=== Final ===
17 December 2017; 16:00 (CET)	Report	Jug Croatia osiguranje	11–4	Jadran Split	Bazen na Savi, Zagreb; Referees: Franulović, Vlašić
17 December 2017; 16:00 (CET)	Report	Score by quarters: 0–1, 4–0, 3–1, 4–2			Bazen na Savi, Zagreb; Referees: Franulović, Vlašić
17 December 2017; 16:00 (CET)	Report	Fatović, Joković 3	Goals	Visković 2	Bazen na Savi, Zagreb; Referees: Franulović, Vlašić

2017 Croatian Cup
Winner

Jug Croatia osiguranje
13th title

Bijač – Jarak, Macan, Fatović, Lončar, Joković (c), García
Reserves: Ivanković, Rašović, Renzuto, Pavličević, Benić, Lozina, Žuvela (goalkeeper)
Head coach
Vjekoslav Kobešćak

==== Final standings ====
	Team
	Jug Croatia osiguranje
Silver medal	Jadran Split
Bronze medal	OVK POŠK
Bronze medal	Mornar Brodospas
