= Xavier García (water polo) =

Spanish water polo player

Personal information
- Full name: Xavier García Gadea
- Nationality: Spanish/Croatian
- Born: 5 January 1984 (age 42) Barcelona, Spain
- Height: 1.98 m (6 ft 6 in)
- Weight: 92 kg (203 lb)

Sport
- Sport: Water polo
- Handedness: Left
- Position: Right Wing

Senior clubs
- Years: Team
- 2003–2005: Barcelona
- 2005–2006: CN Terrassa
- 2006–2010: CN Atlètic-Barceloneta
- 2010–2015: Primorje Rijeka
- 2015–2021: VK Jug
National team
- Years: Team
- 1999–2013: Spain
- 2016–: Croatia
Medal record
Representing Spain
World Championships
Silver medal – second place	2009 Rome	Team
Bronze medal – third place	2007 Melbourne	Team
European Championship
Bronze medal – third place	2006 Belgrade
Mediterranean Games
Gold medal – first place	2005 Almería
Silver medal – second place	2013 Mersin	Team
Representing Croatia
Olympic Games
Silver medal – second place	2016 Rio de Janeiro	Team
World Championship
Gold medal – first place	2017 Budapest	Team
Bronze medal – third place	2019 Gwanjgu	Team
European Water Polo Championship
Bronze medal – third place	2006 Belgrade	Team

Xavier García Gadea (born 5 January 1984) is a Spanish-Croatian water polo player. He was a member of the Spain national team between 1999 and 2013, finishing in sixth place at the 2004 Summer Olympics in Athens, fifth at the 2008 Summer Olympics in Beijing and sixth again at the 2012 Summer Olympics in London. In 2003, García, then playing for CN Barcelona-Noferthe, ended up in fifth place with the national side at the 2003 World Aquatics Championships in his home town of Barcelona.

Since 2010, García has played in Croatia. After being left out of the Spain national team in 2013, he obtained the Croatian citizenship in 2016 to be able to take part in the Rio Olympics, facing Spain in the group stage.

== Honours ==
CN Barcelona

- LEN Euro Cup: 2003–04
- Spanish Championship: 2003–04, 2004–05
- Copa del Rey: 2002–03

CN Atlètic-Barceloneta

- Spanish Championship: 2006–07, 2008–09, 2009–10
- Copa del Rey: 2006–07, 2008–09, 2009–10
- Supercopa de España: 2007, 2009, 2010

Primorje Rijeka

- LEN Champions League runners-up: 2011–12, 2014–15
- Adriatic League: 2012–13, 2013–14, 2014–15
- Croatian Championship: 2013–14, 2014–15
- Croatian Cup: 2012–13, 2013–14, 2014–15

VK Jug

- LEN Champions League: 2015–16; runners-up: 2016–17
- LEN Super Cup: 2016
- Adriatic League: 2015–16, 2016–17, 2017–18
- Croatian Championship: 2015–16, 2016–17, 2017–18, 2018–19, 2019–20
- Croatian Cup: 2015–16, 2016–17, 2017–18, 2018–19

== Awards ==
- Member of the World Team 2018 by total-waterpolo

== Orders ==
- Order of Danica Hrvatska with face of Franjo Bučar – 2016

== See also ==
- Croatia men's Olympic water polo team records and statistics
- List of Olympic medalists in water polo (men)
- List of players who have appeared in multiple men's Olympic water polo tournaments
- List of world champions in men's water polo
- List of World Aquatics Championships medalists in water polo
