= Cosmin Radu =

Romanian water polo player

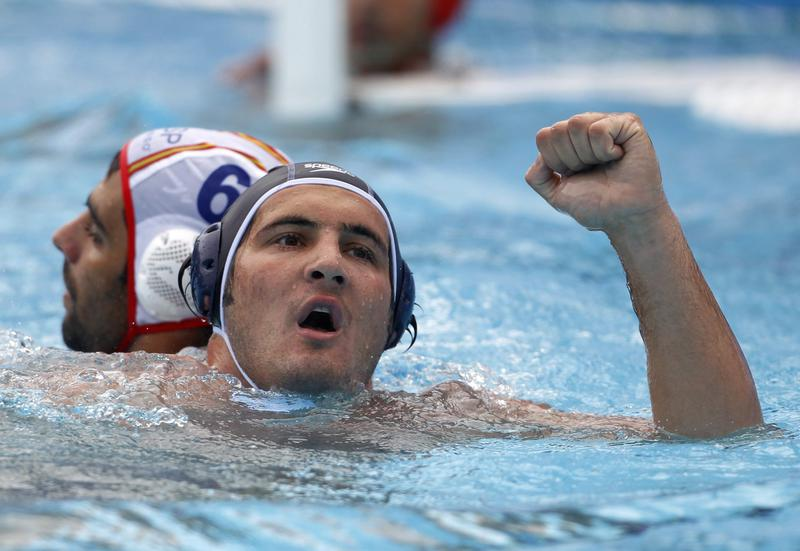

Personal information
- Full name: Cosmin Alexandru Radu
- Nationality: Romanian
- Born: November 9, 1981 (age 44) Bucharest, Romania
- Height: 194 cm (6 ft 4 in)
- Weight: 108 kg (238 lb; 17 st 0 lb)

Sport
- Sport: Water polo
- Handedness: L
- Position: Center

Senior clubs
- Years: Team
- 1997–2004: Rapid București
- 2004–2011: Florentia
- 2011–2013: Mladost
- 2013–2017: Primorje Rijeka
- 2017–2021: Mladost
- 2023–: Dinamo București
National team
- Years: Team
- 1999–2021: Romania

Cosmin Alexandru Radu (born November 9, 1981) is a former Romanian professional water polo player who is currently vice-president of the Romanian Waterpolo Federation. He has played for, Rapid Bucharest, Rari Nantes Florentia, Primorje Rijeka, HAVK Mladost. He was also the captain of Romania's national team for 12 years from 2009 until the end of his international career in 2021.

== Club career ==
Radu was born in Bucharest where he started playing water polo for Rapid Bucharest in 1992. His first year at the senior level was 1997 and continued to play with the team until 2004. He has won 4 consecutive national championships from 2001 until 2004. In 2001 and 2004 has won the award for Top Scorer.

From 2004 to 2011, he played for the Italian club team Rari Nantes Florentia. From 2011 to 2013, he played with the Croatian water polo team HAVK Mladost. He won the Croatian Cup, which took place in Zadar in December 2011, and was named MVP of the competition. Additionally, he finished third in the 2011 Champions League and also secured third place in the Croatian Championship. In the Adriatic League, he finished in the same position as in the other competitions he took part in, which was third place.

During the summer of 2013 he played for the New York Athletic Club (USA) and won the US Open being declared MVP of the competition.

Starting from 2013 had been playing for Primorje Rijeka. In December 2013 he won the Croatian Cup by beating 13-11 Jug Dubrovnik. In April 2014 he had won the Adriatic League at the Final Four played in Zadar by beating Jadran Herceg Novi 13-3 in the semifinals and 8-7 Jug Dubrovnik in the final game.

In May 2014 he won the Croatian Championship defeating in the Finals his former club, HAVK Mladost, with 3-0 at games (13-7 / 11-5 / 13-7). Later the same month he played the Final Six of The Champions League where he lost the semifinal against Barceloneta (10-8), who were to become the champions that year, and won the bronze medal by defeating Partizan Belgrade with 12-6.

In December 2014 he won the Croatian Cup after defeating in the final HAVK Mladost with the score of 12-7.

In April 2015 has played in Rijeka the Final Four of the seventh year of the Jadranska Liga (also known as Regionalna Liga) where in the final Primorje Rijeka won against Jug Dubrovnik (15-9). At the end of the game Radu was elected MVP of the Final Four. In the Croatian Finals in May 2015 that was played against Jug Dubrovnik, at the end of five games that finished 9-8 / 12-13(penalties) / 9-8 / 11-12(penalties) / 11-8, he won the Croatian Championship for the second time in a row. At the end of the same month was played the Final Six of the Champions League. In the semifinal they met again against Jug Dubrovnik which they defeated 10-9 and went to the final game where they eventually lost against Pro Recco with the score of 8-7.

During the 2015–2016 has finished Runner up in the Croatian Cup losing the final against JUG Dubrovnik 10-8. In the Final Four of the Regional League that took place in Dubrovnik in March 2016, Primorje lost 9-5 against Jug Dubrovnik finishing in the second place. The Final of the Croatian Championship that was played best out of 5 games saw the same two teams battling with Jug Dubrovnik winning 3-0 (12-9 / 5-7 / 13-7) and again putting the team of Radu on the second place.

In the summer of 2016 he has played in the Maltese Summer League for the Neptunes WPSC. At the end of the season they managed to win the championship finishing with 11 victories, 3 draws and no defeats. In 14 games he helped his team with 41 goals.

Starting the 2017/2018 season he returned to HAVK Mladost where, in 2018, he won the silver medal in the Regional League after being defeated in the final by Jug Dubrovnik with the score of 15-8.

During the 2018/2019 season HAVK Mladost played multiple finals against JUG Dubrovnik. In the Croatian Cup they were awarded the silver medals after bowing to Jug 8-7 but in the Regional League, after finishing for the first time in the club's history the first place in the regular season, the defeated in the Final Four of the competition Jug 13-12 after a pretty one sided game. At the conclusion of the tournament he received the award MVP of the regular season. In the Croatian Championship his team finished second after losing The Finals with a total of 3-0 (4-10/9-10/11-14) against Jug Dubrovnik.

In December 2019 Mladost (2019/2020 season) defeated Jug Dubrovnik 16-12 in the Final of the Croatian Cup bringing the trophy back to Zagreb after 8 years.

== International career ==
The first selection in the national team came in 1999. Was selected as the captain of the team in 2009.
Has played in 10 European Championships, the most notable result being the 4th Place at the 2006 European Championships in Belgrade.
The other ones were:

- 2001 Budapest - 11th place
- 2003 Kranj - 10th place
- 2008 Malaga - 9th place
- 2010 Zagreb - 7th place
- 2012 Eindhoven - 8th place
- 2014 Budapest - 8th place
- 2016 Belgrade - 10th place
- 2018 Barcelona - 10th place
- 2020 Budapest - 11th place

Has won the Top Scorer award at the 2011 FINA World Aquatics Championships in Shanghai with 20 goals and has participated at the following World Championships:

- 2003 Barcelona - 12th place
- 2005 Montreal - 6th place
- 2007 Melbourne - 11th place
- 2009 Rome - 7th place
- 2011 Shanghai - 12th place

Fina Cup:

- 2006 Budapest - 6th place
- 2010 Oradea - 5th place

World League:

- 2007 Berlin - 7th place

Has qualified to the 2012 Summer Olympics London and finished 10th with the national team.

== Honours ==
=== Club ===
Rapid București

- Romanian Championship: 2000–01, 2001–02, 2002–03, 2003–04

Mladost

- LEN Champions League third: 2011–12
- Croatian Championship: 2020–21
- Croatian Cup: 2011–12, 2019–20, 2020–21
- Regional League: 2019-2020

Primorje Rijeka

- LEN Champions League third and runners-up: 2013–14, 2014–15
- Croatian Championship: 2013–14, 2014–15
- Croatian Cup: 2012–13, 2013–14, 2014–15
- Adriatic League: 2012–13, 2013–14, 2014–15

New York Athletic Club

- US Open: 2013

Neptunes WPSC

- Summer League: 2016

== Awards ==
2001-2002 Top Scorer of The Romanian Superleague
2003-2004 Top Scorer of The Romanian Superleague
2011 Top Scorer World Championships in Shanghai
2011 MVP of The Croatian Cup
2013 MVP of US Open
2014-2015 MVP of The Final Four Regional League
2018-2019 MVP of The Regional League
