= Ivan Buljubašić =

Croatian water polo player (born 1987)

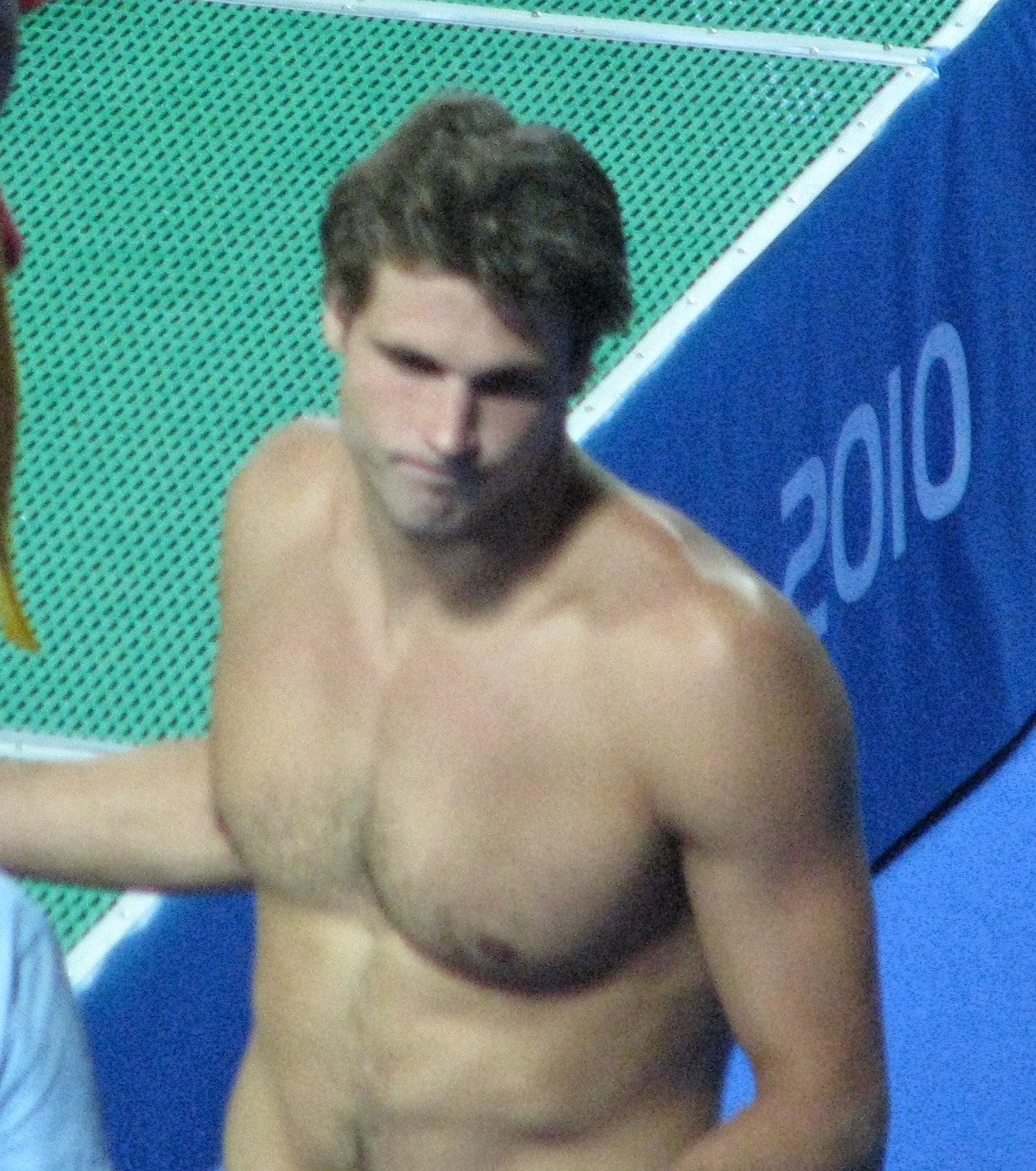

Personal information
- Born: 31 October 1987 (age 38) Makarska, SR Croatia, SFR Yugoslavia
- Height: 6 ft (1.8 m)
- Weight: 238 lb (108 kg)

Sport
- Sport: Water polo
- Handedness: Right
- Position: Centre back
- Current club: Pallanuoto Trieste

Senior clubs
- Years: Team
- 2003–2007: Jadran Herceg Novi
- 2007–20011: Mladost
- 2011–2019: Primorje Rijeka
- 2019–2020: Olympiacos
- 2020–: Pallanuoto Trieste
Medal record
Olympic Games
Gold medal – first place	2012 London	Team
World Championship
Gold medal – first place	2017 Budapest	Team
Bronze medal – third place	2009 Rome	Team
Bronze medal – third place	2011 Shanghai	Team
European Championship
Gold medal – first place	2010 Zagreb
Bronze medal – third place	2018 Barcelona
World Cup
Silver medal – second place	2010 Oradea
FINA World League
Bronze medal – third place	2017 Ruza
Silver medal – second place	2019 Belgrade
Silver medal – second place	2015 Bergamo
Gold medal – first place	2012 Almaty
Silver medal – second place	2009 Podgorica
Bronze medal – third place	2011 Florence

Ivan Buljubašić (born 31 October 1987) is a Croatian water polo player. At the 2012 Summer Olympics, he competed for the gold medal-winning Croatian men's national water polo team in the men's event.

At club level, Buljubašić plays for Greek powerhouse Olympiacos.

== Honours ==
=== Club ===
Jardan Herceg Novi

- Montenegrin Cup: 2006–07

Mladost

- Croatian Championship: 2007–08
- Croatian Cup: 2010–11

Primorje Rijeka

- LEN Champions League runners-up: 2011–12, 2014–15
- Croatian Championship: 2013–14, 2014–15
- Croatian Cup: 2012–13, 2013–14, 2014–15
- Adriatic League: 2012–13, 2013–14, 2014–15

Olympiacos

- Greek Championship: 2019–20
- Greek Cup: 2019–20
- Greek Super Cup: 2019

== See also ==
- Croatia men's Olympic water polo team records and statistics
- List of Olympic champions in men's water polo
- List of Olympic medalists in water polo (men)
- List of world champions in men's water polo
- List of World Aquatics Championships medalists in water polo
