= Kristijan Milaković =

Croatian professional water polo player (born 1992)

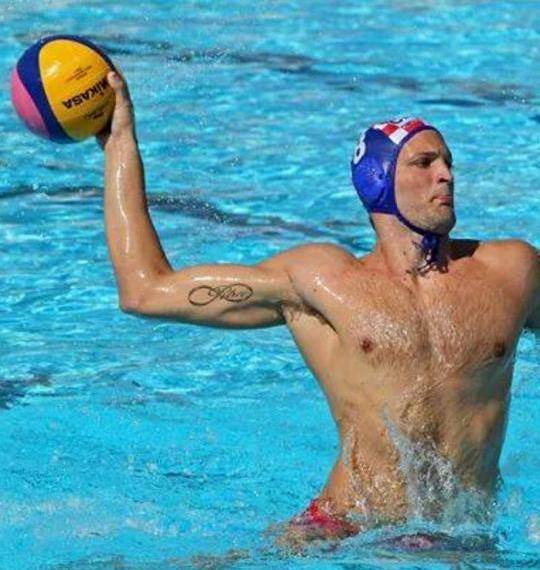
- Kristijan Milaković playing for Croatia in 2014

Personal information
- Nationality: Croatian
- Born: April 21, 1992 (age 34) Zagreb, Croatia
- Height: 2.03 m (6 ft 8 in)
- Weight: 120 kg (265 lb)

Sport
- Sport: Water polo
- Position: Left driver
- Number: 8
Medal record
Men's water polo
Representing Croatia
World Cup
| Bronze medal – third place | 2014 Almaty | Team |
U18 World Championship
| Gold medal – first place | 2009 Šibenik | Team |
U17 European Championship
| Bronze medal – third place | 2008 Belgrade | Team |

Kristijan Milaković (born April 21, 1992) is a Croatian professional water polo player who currently plays for Savona of the Serie A1 (water polo). He also represents the Croatia men's national water polo team. Although his primary positions are left or right flat (driver), he is polivalent player and he can play as Hole D as well. He is 203 cm tall and 105 kg heavy but his main advantage and the fact with whom he is making difference among other water polo players in the pool is 220 cm long arm span (reach).

== Personal life ==
Kristijan Milaković was born and raised in Zagreb. He started with swimming, but at the age of 8 he switched to water polo.

In 2011 Milaković passed the entrance exam at the Zagreb School of Business to become a part-time undergraduate student of Communications management.

== Club career ==
=== VK Medveščak Zagreb ===
Milaković started to play water polo at the age of 8 in VK Medveščak Zagreb. From first appearance he was considered as a major talent, what he proved through following years where he won numerous medals in youth (18) and junior (6) competitions and also by winning 4 individual awards. Because of his great performances he was transferred to senior team when he was 15 years old. After the first year where he collected experience and successfully overcame all the traps of senior age, his talent and skills once again came to the fore. His good performances were not missed by Mladost scouts who wanted to bring him in the summer of 2010, but Medveščak did not want to get rid of his services so easily. Milaković did not sink after an unsuccessful transfer, but became a leading player of VK Medveščak. Especially he proved himself in Cup match against Mladost which resulted with the first victory of VK Medveščak after more than 40 years, where he was one of the most notable individuals. After the end of 2010/11 season two clubs made an agreement and Milaković finally became new player of Mladost.

=== HAVK Mladost Zagreb ===
After joining Mladost, Milaković started to adjust to new teammates and accordingly his performances varied. His first notable performance with the new club was in the 2011 Croatian Cup finals, where he played under temperature. That fact did not stop him from helping his team by scoring 2 goals in a monstrous win over Jug who entered the finals as a huge favorite. He continued with playing his first season in "warm-cold" style with occasional flashes. The first season with Mladost ended magnificently since his performances helped the club to win its second bronze medal in a row in Champions League.

== Accomplishments ==
=== Club competitions ===
Milaković won numerous medals in his youth (18) and junior (6) competitions while he was playing for VK Medveščak. As a part of the class of '92, who made great contribution to the club, he has a special place in club's showcase.

Milaković continued winning trophies while he was playing for HAVK Mladost and won 10 medals with his former club. The full table is listed below.

| Year | Competition | Achievement | Club |
|---|---|---|---|
| 2014 | Euro Cup | 2nd place, silver medalist(s) | HAVK Mladost |
| 2014 | Croatian Championship | 2nd place, silver medalist(s) | HAVK Mladost |
| 2014 | Adriatic League | 3rd place, bronze medalist(s) | HAVK Mladost |
| 2013 | Croatian Cup | 3rd place, bronze medalist(s) | HAVK Mladost |
| 2013 | Adriatic League | 3rd place, bronze medalist(s) | HAVK Mladost |
| 2013 | Croatian Championship | 3rd place, bronze medalist(s) | HAVK Mladost |
| 2012 | Croatian Cup | 3rd place, bronze medalist(s) | HAVK Mladost |
| 2012 | Champions League | 3rd place, bronze medalist(s) | HAVK Mladost |
| 2012 | Croatian Championship | 3rd place, bronze medalist(s) | HAVK Mladost |
| 2011 | Croatian Cup | 1st place, gold medalist(s) | HAVK Mladost |

=== National team ===
In summer of 2007 Milaković joined the Croatian National Team and passed all youth and junior categories. In 2012 he passed to senior tem where he continued with conquering medals for home country.

| Year | Event | Host | Placement | Country |
|---|---|---|---|---|
| 2014 | World Cup | (Kazakhstan) Almaty | 3rd | Croatia |
| 2014 | Samartzidis Cup | (Greece) Athens | 1st | Croatia |
| 2014 | Bnet Cup | (Croatia) Zagreb | 1st | Croatia |
| 2011 | U20 World Championship | (Greece) Volos | 6th | Croatia |
| 2009 | U18 World Championship | (Croatia) Šibenik | 1st | Croatia |
| 2008 | U17 European Championship | (Serbia) Belgrade | 3rd | Croatia |
| 2007 | U16 International Tournament | (Serbia) Obrenovac | 1st | Croatia |

== Career statistics ==
=== Club ===
As of match played 28 November 2015

Club statistics
| Club | Season | League | | | Championship | | National Cup | | Europe | | Total | | |
| Club | Season | Division | Apps | Goals | Apps | Goals | Apps | Goals | Apps | Goals | Apps | Goals | % |
|---|---|---|---|---|---|---|---|---|---|---|---|---|---|
| (Croatia) HAVK Mladost | 2011–12 | Adriatic League | 16 | 19 | 5 | 9 | 3 | 3 | 16 | 12 | 40 | 43 | 1,1 |
| (Croatia) HAVK Mladost | 2012–13 | Adriatic League | 18 | 41 | 4 | 3 | 2 | 4 | — | | 24 | 48 | 2,0 |
| (Croatia) HAVK Mladost | 2013–14 | Adriatic League | 23 | 54 | 5 | 7 | 2 | 5 | 12 | 33 | 42 | 99 | 2,3 |
| (Croatia) HAVK Mladost | Total | | 57 | 114 | 14 | 19 | 7 | 12 | 28 | 45 | 106 | 190 | 1,8 |
| (Italy) Como Nuoto | 2014–15 | Serie A1 | 22 | 34 | — | | 3 | 5 | — | | 25 | 39 | 1,6 |
| (Italy) Como Nuoto | Total | | 22 | 34 | — | | 3 | 5 | — | | 25 | 39 | 1,6 |
| (Italy) Savona | 2015–16 | Serie A1 | 10 | 17 | — | | - | - | — | | 10 | 17 | 1,7 |
| (Italy) Savona | Total | | 10 | 17 | — | | - | - | — | | 10 | 17 | 1,7 |
| (Italy) Trieste | –21 | | | | | | | | | | | | |
| (Hungary) Szolnok | 2021– | OB I | | | | | | | | | | | |
| Career total | | | 89 | 165 | 14 | 19 | 10 | 17 | 28 | 45 | 141 | 246 | 1,7 |

=== International ===
As of match played 24 August 2014

| National team | Year | Apps | Goals |
|---|---|---|---|
| Croatia | 2012 | 1 | 3 |
| Croatia | 2013 | 2 | 1 |
| Croatia | 2014 | 16 | 15 |
| Total | | 19 | 19 |

== Individual awards ==
- (2014) Top scorer of LEN Euro Cup
- (2011) Zagreb's best male sports team - HAVK Mladost (common award for all players)
- (2009) All-star team of U18 World Championship in Šibenik
- (2009) Annual award from Zagreb Water polo Association for extraordinary contribution in conquering of gold medal on U18 World Championship in Šibenik
- (2009) Annual award for best U17 water polo player from Zagreb Water polo Association
- (2008) MVP of U17 Croatian Championship
- (2008) MVP of U17 Croatian Cup
- (2007) MVP of U16 Christmas International Tournament in Kamnik, Slovenia
- (2007) MVP of U16 "Trophy of Belgrade" Tournament in Belgrade, Serbia

== See also ==
- Glossary of water polo
- History of water polo
