= Sandro Sukno =

Croatian water polo player (born 1990)

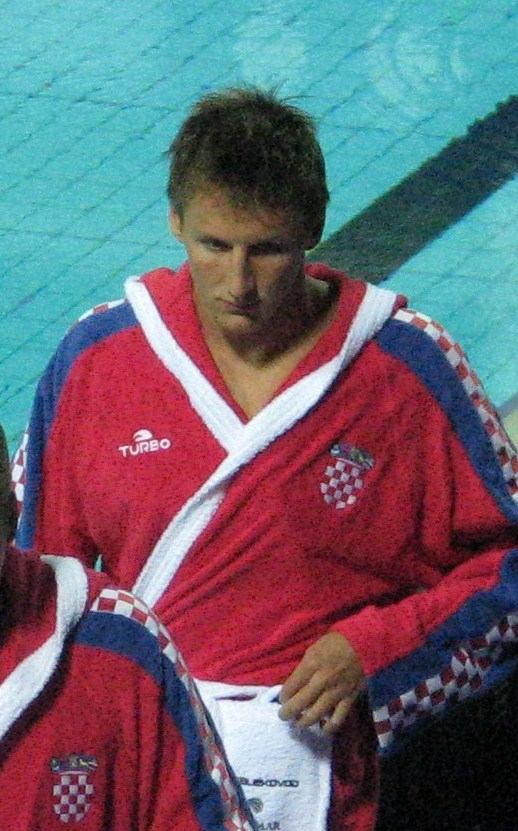

Personal information
- Full name: Sandro Sukno
- Nationality: Croatian
- Born: 30 June 1990 (age 36) Dubrovnik, SR Croatia, SFR Yugoslavia
- Height: 2.00 m (6 ft 7 in)
- Weight: 93 kg (205 lb)

Sport
- Sport: Water polo
- Handedness: Right
- Position: Wing

Senior clubs
- Years: Team
- 2008–2011: Jug Dubrovnik
- 2011–2012: Pro Recco
- 2012–2015: Primorje Rijeka
- 2015–2017: Pro Recco
- 2018–2019: Jug Dubrovnik
Medal record
Olympic Games
| Gold medal – first place | 2012 London | Team |
| Silver medal – second place | 2016 Rio de Janeiro | Team |
World Championship
| Gold medal – first place | 2017 Budapest | Team |
| Silver medal – second place | 2015 Kazan | Team |
| Bronze medal – third place | 2009 Rome | Team |
| Bronze medal – third place | 2011 Shanghai | Team |
| Bronze medal – third place | 2013 Barcelona | Team |
European Championship
| Gold medal – first place | 2010 Zagreb |
World Cup
| Silver medal – second place | 2010 Oradea |
FINA World League
| Gold medal – first place | 2012 Almaty |
| Silver medal – second place | 2009 Podgorica |
| Bronze medal – third place | 2010 Niš |
| Bronze medal – third place | 2011 Florence |
Mediterranean Games
| Gold medal – first place | 2013 Mersin | Team |

Sandro Sukno (born 30 June 1990) is a Croatian former professional water polo player. At the 2012 Summer Olympics, he competed for the Croatia national team in the men's event winning the gold medal. He also won a silver medal at the 2016 Summer Olympics. He last played for VK Jug. He currently works as head coach of the Italian club team Pro Recco.

Sukno's father is Goran Sukno, water polo gold medalist for Yugoslavia at the 1984 Summer Olympics.

Sukno was named Croatian water polo player of the year in 2014 and 2015, and best player in the 2014–15 Prva Liga. In December 2017, Sukno won the trophy for the best water polo player in the 2016–17 season. In 2017 he was named to the All-Star Team of the World Championships. Croatia also won the World Championship that year. In May 2019, he announced his retirement from playing professional water polo citing heart problems.

== Honours ==
=== As player ===
Pro Recco

- LEN Champions League: 2011–12
- LEN Super Cup: 2012, 2015
- Adriatic League: 2011 –12
- Serie A1: 2011–12, 2015–16, 2016–17
- Coppa Italia: 2015–16, 2016–17

Primorje Rijeka

- LEN Champions League runners-up: 2014–15
- Croatian Championship: 2013–14, 2014–15
- Croatian Cup: 2012–13, 2013–14, 2014–15
- Adriatic League: 2012–13, 2013–14, 2014–15

=== As coach ===
Pro Recco

- Serie A1: 2022, 2023, 2024, 2025, 2026
- LEN Champions League: 2022, 2023
- LEN Super Cup: 2021, 2022, 2023
- Coppa Italia: 2022, 2023, 2025, 2026

== Awards ==
- Total-waterpolo magazine's man water polo "World Player of the Year" award: 2017
- Member of the Second World Team of the Year's 2000–20 by total-waterpolo
- Member of the World Team 2017 by total-waterpolo
- LEN Champions League MVP: 2014–15
- Croatian Water Polo Player of the Year: 2014 with Primorje Rijeka
- Croatian Water Polo Player of the Year: 2015 with Primorje Rijeka
- Croatian Water Polo Player of the Year: 2017 with Pro Recco
- Adriatic League MVP 2012–13 with Primorje Rijeka
- Adriatic League MVP 2014–15 with Primorje Rijeka
- Adriatic League Top Scorer: 2010–11 with Primorje Rijeka
- Adriatic League Top Scorer: 2014–15 with Primorje Rijeka
- LEN Champions League Top Scorer: 2014–15 with Primorje Rijeka
- World Cup Top Scorer: 2010 Oradea
- World League Top Scorer: 2011 Firenze
- European Championship Top Scorer: 2012 Eindhoven
- World Championship Top Scorer: 2013 Barcelona
- Olympic Games 2016 Team of the Tournament
- 2013 World Championship Team of the Tournament
- 2017 World Championship Team of the Tournament

== Orders ==
- Order of Danica Hrvatska with face of Franjo Bučar - 2016

== See also ==
- Croatia men's Olympic water polo team records and statistics
- List of Olympic champions in men's water polo
- List of Olympic medalists in water polo (men)
- List of men's Olympic water polo tournament top goalscorers
- List of world champions in men's water polo
- List of World Aquatics Championships medalists in water polo

Sporting positions
| Preceded by Josip Pavić | Croatia captain 2016–2017 | Succeeded by Andro Bušlje |
