= Paulo Obradović =

Croatian water polo player

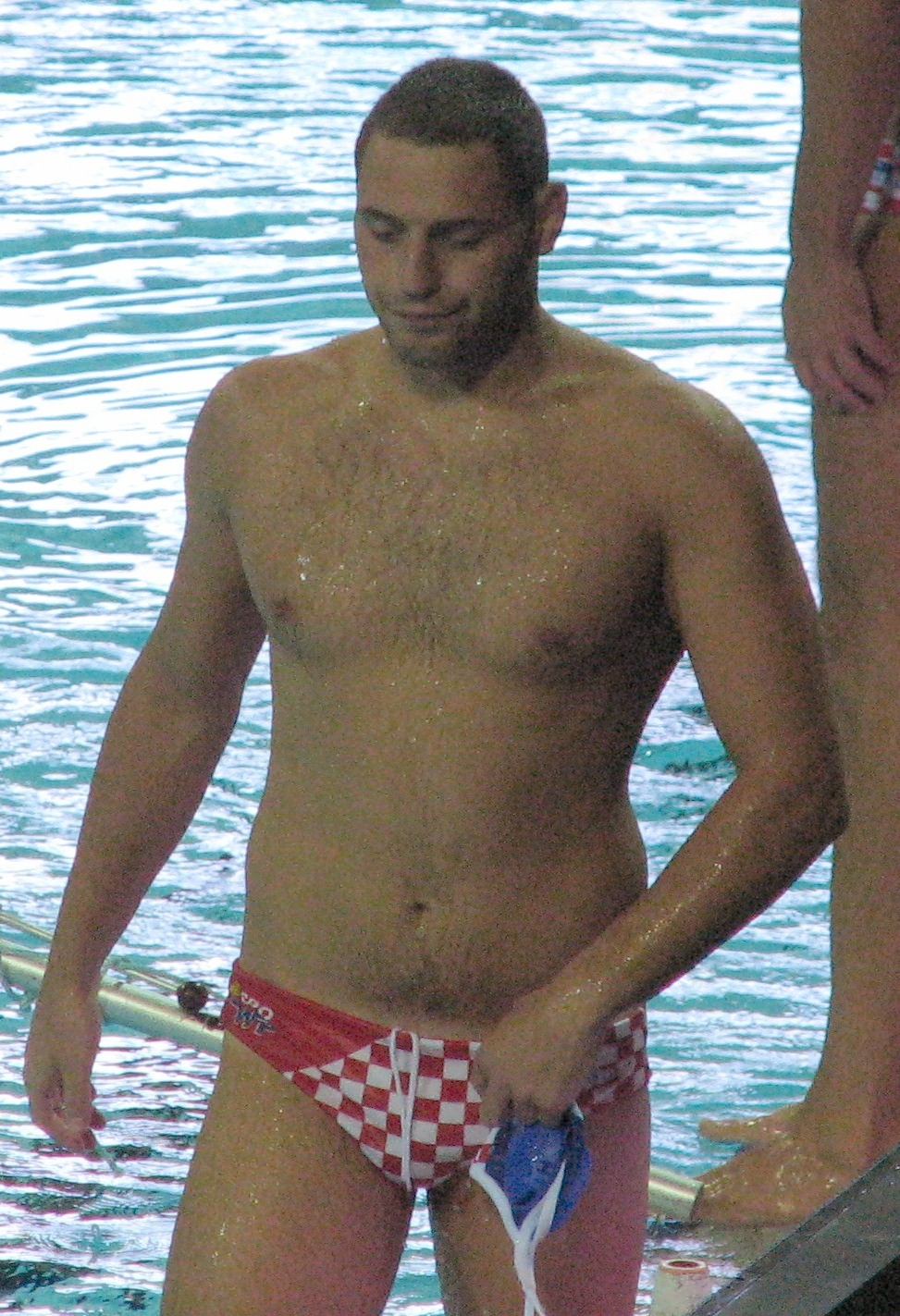

Personal information
- Nationality: Croatian
- Born: 9 March 1986 (age 40) Dubrovnik, SR Croatia, SFR Yugoslavia
- Height: 190 cm (75 in)
- Weight: 100 kg (220 lb)

Sport
- Sport: Water polo
- Current club: Enka

Senior clubs
- Years: Team
- 2003–2012: Jug Dubrovnik
- 2012–2014: Primorje Rijeka
- 2014–2017: Jug Dubrovnik
- 2017–2019: Olympiacos
- 2019–2021: Jug Dubrovnik
- 2021–present: Enka
Medal record
Olympic Games
Gold medal – first place	2012 London	Team
World Championship
Silver medal – second place	2015 Kazan	Team
Bronze medal – third place	2009 Rome	Team
Bronze medal – third place	2011 Shanghai	Team
Bronze medal – third place	2013 Barcelona	Team
European Championship
Gold medal – first place	2010 Zagreb	Team
FINA World League
Silver medal – second place	2009 Podgorica	Team
Bronze medal – third place	2010 Niš	Team
Bronze medal – third place	2011 Florence	Team
Mediterranean Games
Gold medal – first place	2013 Mersin	Team

Paulo Obradović (born 9 March 1986) is a Croatian water polo player. At the 2012 Summer Olympics, he competed for the Croatia men's national water polo team in the men's event, where they won the gold medal. He is 6 ft 3 inches tall. At club level, he played for Greek powerhouse Olympiacos, with whom he won the 2017–18 LEN Champions League.

He went on loan for the summer 2018 with San Giljan A.S.C. He now plays for Jug AO.

== Honours ==
Jug Dubrovnik

- LEN Champions League: 2005–06, 2015–16; runners-up: 2006–07, 2007–08, 2016–17
- LEN Super Cup: 2006, 2016
- Adriatic League: 2008–09, 2015–16, 2016–17
- Croatian Championship: 2003–04, 2004–05, 2005–06 2006–07, 2008–09, 2009–10, 2010–11, 2011–12, 2015–16, 2016–17, 2019–20
- Croatian Cup: 2005–06, 2006–07, 2007–08, 2008–09, 2009–10, 2015–16, 2016–17

Primorje Rijeka

- LEN Champions League runners-up: 2011–12
- Croatian Championship: 2013–14
- Adriatic League: 2012–13, 2013–14
- Croatian Cup: 2012–13, 2013–14

Olympiacos

- LEN Champions League: 2017–18; runners-up: 2018–19
- Greek Championship: 2017–18, 2018–19
- Greek Cup: 2017–18, 2018–19
- Greek Super Cup: 2018

== Awards ==
- MVP of the 2013–14 Adriatic League with Primorje Rijeka
- Top Scorer of the 2016–17 Adriatic League with Jug Dubrovnik

== See also ==
- Croatia men's Olympic water polo team records and statistics
- List of Olympic champions in men's water polo
- List of Olympic medalists in water polo (men)
- List of World Aquatics Championships medalists in water polo
