= Bruno Silić =

Personal information
- Full name: Bruno Silić
- Nationality: Croatian
- Born: 1 December 1958 Split, PR Croatia, FPR Yugoslavia
- Died: 18 January 2004 (aged 45) Zagreb, Croatia

Sport
- Sport: Water polo

Teams coached
- Years: Team
- 1978–1986: Jadran Split (youth)
- 1986–1990: Jadran Split
- 1991–1992: VK Triglav
- 1992–1993: ANO Glyfada
- 1993–1995: Mladost Zagreb
- 1994–1998: Croatia
- 2000–2003: Mladost Zagreb
Medal record
Head coach for Croatia
Olympic Games
Silver medal – second place	1996 Atlanta

Bruno Silić (1 December 1958 – 18 January 2004) was a Croatian professional water polo player and coach.

== Career ==
He was the coach of Jadran Split, Triglav Kranj, Glyfada and Mladost Zagreb.

He also was the coach of the senior men's Croatia national team from 1993 until 1998, winning the silver medal at the 1996 Summer Olympics in Atlanta.

Leading Mladost Zagreb, he won four Croatian Championships, two Croatian Cups, as well as the LEN Cup in 2001.
