= Luka Lončar =

Croatian water polo player (born 1987)

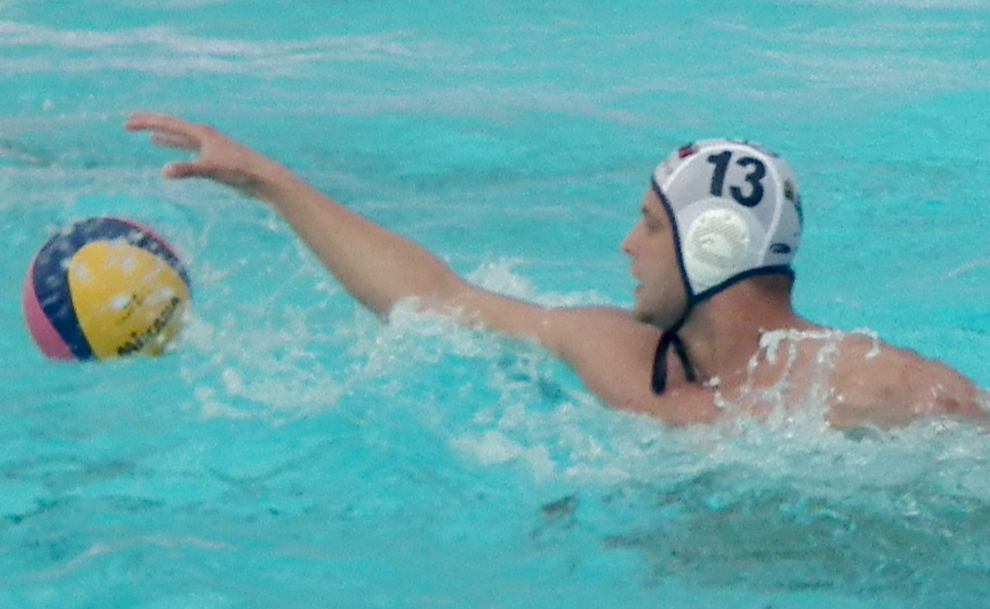
- Lončar in 2011

Personal information
- Nationality: Croatian
- Born: 26 June 1987 (age 39) Zagreb, SR Croatia, Yugoslavia
- Height: 1.95 m (6 ft 5 in)
- Weight: 118 kg (260 lb)

Sport
- Sport: Water polo
- Handedness: Right
- Position: Centre forward
- Current club: Olympiacos Piraeus
- Number: 10

Senior clubs
- Years: Team
- 2010–2011: Medveščak
- 2011–2013: Brescia
- 2013–2015: Mladost
- 2015–2021: Jug Dubrovnik
- 2021–2023: Pro Recco
- 2023–2025: Olympiacos Piraeus
- 2025–2026: Mladost
- 2026–: Olympiacos Piraeus
National team
- Years: Team
- Croatia
Medal record
Men's water polo
Representing Croatia
Olympic Games
Silver medal – second place	2016 Rio de Janeiro	Team
Silver medal – second place	2024 Paris	Team
World Championship
Gold medal – first place	2017 Budapest	Team
Gold medal – first place	2024 Doha	Team
Silver medal – second place	2015 Kazan	Team
Bronze medal – third place	2013 Barcelona	Team
Bronze medal – third place	2019 Gwanjgu	Team
European Championship
Silver medal – second place	2024 Zagreb
Bronze medal – third place	2018 Barcelona
FINA World League
Silver medal – second place	2015 Bergamo
Bronze medal – third place	2017 Ruza
Silver medal – second place	2019 Belgrade
World Cup
Bronze medal – third place	2014 Kazakhstan
Mediterranean Games
Gold medal – first place	2013 Mersin	Team

Luka Lončar (born 26 June 1987) is a Croatian professional water polo player. He was part of the Croatian team at the 2016 Summer Olympics, and the 2024 Summer Olympics, winning a silver medal each year. Lončar also competed for Croatia at the 2020 Summer Olympics, where the team finished in fifth place.

== Honours ==
=== Club ===
AN Brescia

- Coppa Italia: 2011–12

Jug Dubrovnik

- LEN Champions League: 2015–16; runners-up: 2016–17
- LEN Super Cup: 2016
- Croatian Championship: 2015–16, 2016–17, 2017–18, 2018–19, 2019–20
- Croatian Cup: 2015–16, 2016–17, 2017–18, 2018–19
- Adriatic League: 2015–16, 2016–17, 2017–18

Pro Recco

- LEN Champions League: 2021–22, 2022–23
- LEN Super Cup: 2021
- Serie A1: 2021–22, 2022–23
- Coppa Italia: 2021–22, 2022–23

Olympiacos

- Greek Championship: 2023–24, 2024–25
- Greek Cup: 2023–24, 2024–25

== Awards ==
- Member of the World Team by total-waterpolo : 2017, 2018
- LEN Champions League Center Forward of the Year: 2015–16, 2016–17
- Adriatic League MVP: 2016–17
- Croatian Championship MVP: 2016–17, 2017–18
- Croatian Championship Center Forward of the Year: 2015–16, 2016–17, 2017–18, 2018–19, 2019–20, 2020–21
- Adriatic League Center Forward of the Year: 2015–16, 2016–17, 2017–18, 2018–19
- Croatian Water Polo Player of the Year: 2018
- World Championship Team of the Tournament: 2017

== See also ==
- List of Olympic medalists in water polo (men)
- List of world champions in men's water polo
- List of World Aquatics Championships medalists in water polo
