= Vjekoslav Kobešćak =

Croatian water polo player

Personal information
- Nationality: Croatian
- Born: 20 January 1974 (age 52) Zagreb, SFR Yugoslavia
- Height: 189 cm (74 in)
- Weight: 89 kg (196 lb)

Sport
- Sport: Water polo
- Current club: Jug (head coach)

Senior clubs
- Years: Team
- –: Mladost Zagreb

Teams coached
- 2015–: Jug
Medal record
Men's water polo
Representing Croatia
Olympic Games
Silver medal – second place	1996 Atlanta	Team

Vjekoslav Kobešćak (born 20 January 1974) is a Croatian professional water polo coach and former player. He competed in the 1996, 2000 and 2004 Summer Olympics, representing the Croatia national team. He is currently the head coach of VK Jug.

His father Vlado is a former president of the Croatian Water Polo Federation, while his brother Dario is a former Croatian water polo player. He is married Antonia Kojan.

On 3 February 2000, Kobeščak was sentenced in Municipal Court in Croatia to a one-year prison sentence. He was convicted of a serious traffic accident that happened on 6 November 1993, in which his passenger Marijana Matošin was killed.

== Honours ==
Coach

Jug Dubrovnik

- LEN Champions League (1): 2015–16
- LEN Champions League runners-up: 2016–17
- LEN Super Cup (1): 2016
- Adriatic League (4): 2015–16, 2016–17, 2017–18,2022-23
- National Championship of Croatia (6): 2015–16, 2016–17, 2017–18, 2018–19, 2019–20, 2021–22
- National Cup of Croatia (5):2015-16, 2016–17, 2017–18, 2018–19,2022-23

Croatian Supercup: 2022-23

== See also ==
- List of Olympic medalists in water polo (men)
