= 2014–15 Adriatic Water Polo League =

2014–15 Adriatic League season
- League: Adriatic League
- Sport: Water polo
- Duration: October 4, 2014 – January 31, 2015 (regular season)
- Teams: Croatia (7 teams); Serbia (4 teams); Montenegro (3 team); Slovenia (1 team)
- Season champions: VK Primorje
- Top scorer: Sandro Sukno (62)

Adriatic Water Polo League seasons
- ← 2013–14 2015–16 →

The 2014–15 Adriatic League (known as the Triglav Regionalna Liga for sponsorship reasons) was the 7th season of the Adriatic Water Polo League, with 15 teams from Croatia, Serbia, Montenegro and Slovenia participating in it.

Regular season started on October 4, 2014, and lasted until January 31, 2015 followed by playoffs of the four best placed teams, for the 2 groups.

== Team information ==
Locations of the 2014–15 Adriatic Water Polo League (former Yugoslavia)

Country	Teams	Team	City	Pool
Croatia	7			
Croatia	7	Jadran	Split	Bazen Jadran
Croatia	7	Jug	Dubrovnik	Bazen u Gružu
Croatia	7	Medveščak	Zagreb	Bazen Utrina
Croatia	7	HAVK Mladost	Zagreb	Bazen Mladost na Savi
Croatia	7	Mornar	Split	Bazeni Poljud
Croatia	7	POŠK	Split	Bazeni Poljud
Croatia	7	Primorje	Rijeka	Bazeni Kantrida
Serbia	4			
Serbia	4	Crvena zvezda	Belgrade	Bazen Tašmajdan
Serbia	4	Partizan	Belgrade	SC Banjica
Serbia	4	Radnički	Kragujevac	SC „Park“
Serbia	4	Vojvodina	Novi Sad	SC Slana bara
Montenegro	3			
Montenegro	3	Budva	Budva	SRC Budva
Montenegro	3	Jadran	Herceg Novi	Bazen "Simo Milošević"
Montenegro	3	Primorac	Kotor	Bazen „Nikša Bućin“
Slovenia	1	AVK Branik	Maribor	Kopališče Pristan

== Regular season ==
=== Standings (Group A) ===
	Team	Pld	W	D	L	GF	GA	Diff	Pts
1	Primorje Erste Banka	14	13	1	0	208	71	+137	40
2	Radnički Kon Tiki	14	10	2	2	163	95	+68	32
2	HAVK Mladost	14	9	1	4	170	106	+64	28
4	Partizan Raifaisen	14	7	1	6	157	124	+33	22
5	OVK POŠK	14	5	1	8	119	153	−34	16
6	Budva	14	4	3	7	105	152	−47	15
7	Jadran Split	14	3	1	10	109	167	−58	10
8	Branik Maribor	14	0	0	14	103	266	−163	0

=== Standings (Group B) ===
	Team	Pld	W	D	L	GF	GA	Diff	Pts
1	Jug Dubrovnik	12	12	0	0	186	77	+109	36
2	Mornar	12	8	0	4	123	102	+21	24
3	Jadran Herceg Novi	12	7	2	3	123	103	+20	23
4	Crvena zvezda	12	7	0	5	126	113	+13	21
5	Vojvodina	12	3	2	7	83	121	−38	11
6	Primorac Kotor	12	1	1	10	82	142	−60	4
7	Medveščak	12	1	1	10	72	137	−65	4

== Season statistics ==
=== Top goalscorers ===
Updated to games played on 20 December 2014.

Rank	Player	Team	Goals
1	(Croatia) Sandro Sukno	Primorje	37
2	(Serbia) Gavril Subotić	Partizan	26
3	(Romania) Cosmin Radu	Primorje	23
3	(Serbia) Srđan Vuksanović	Radnički	23
5	(Croatia) Ivica Prižmić	POŠK	21
5	(Croatia) Jerko Marinić Kragić	Mornar	21
7	(Croatia) Ante Vukičević	Mladost	20
7	(Croatia) Luka Bukić	Mladost	20
7	(Montenegro) Nikola Murišić	Budva	20
10	(Canada) Nicolas Constantin-Bicari	Jug	18

== Adriatic League clubs in European competitions ==
As of 20 December 2014

Key to colors
Teams still participating

Team	Competition	Progress
(Croatia) Jug Dubrovnik	Champions League	Preliminary round
(Serbia) Partizan	Champions League	Preliminary round
(Croatia) Primorje Riejka	Champions League	Preliminary round
(Serbia) Crvena zvezda	Champions League	Qualification round III
(Croatia) HAVK Mladost	Champions League	Qualification round III
(Serbia) Radnički Kragujevac	Champions League	Preliminary round
(Croatia) Mornar	Euro Cup	Semi-finals
(Montenegro) Primorac Kotor	Euro Cup	Qualification round II
(Montenegro) Jadran Herceg Novi	Euro Cup*	Qualification round II
(Serbia) Vojvodina	Euro Cup	Qualification round II
