= VK Opatija =

- Founded: 1981
- League: Croatian First League; Adriatic League
- Based in: Opatija, Croatia
- Arena: Kantrida; Capacity: 1,200
- Colors
- President: Nikica Pažin
- Head coach: Danijel Kancijanić
- Website: vk-kvarner-opatija.hr

VK Opatija (Croatian: Vaterpolski klub Opatija) is a Croatian water polo club based in Opatija. The club currently competes in Croatian First League and in Adriatic League.

== History ==
The club was founded in 1981. as VK Opatija. Under that name, the club was active until 1992. when they change their name into VK Kvarner. In 2007., new club management has made the decision to return the original name of the club so that the club can identify with the city and the entire region of Liburnia so the club is now called VK Opatija 1981.

In 1986., Croatian Water Polo Federation awarded the club a trophy for the best water polo collective in Croatia.

=== Name changes ===
- VK Opatija (1981. - 1989.)
- VK KEY Opatija (1989. - 1992.)
- VK Kvarner Express (1992. - 2007.)
- VK Opatija 1981 (2007. - present)
