= Maro Joković =

Croatian water polo player (born 1987)

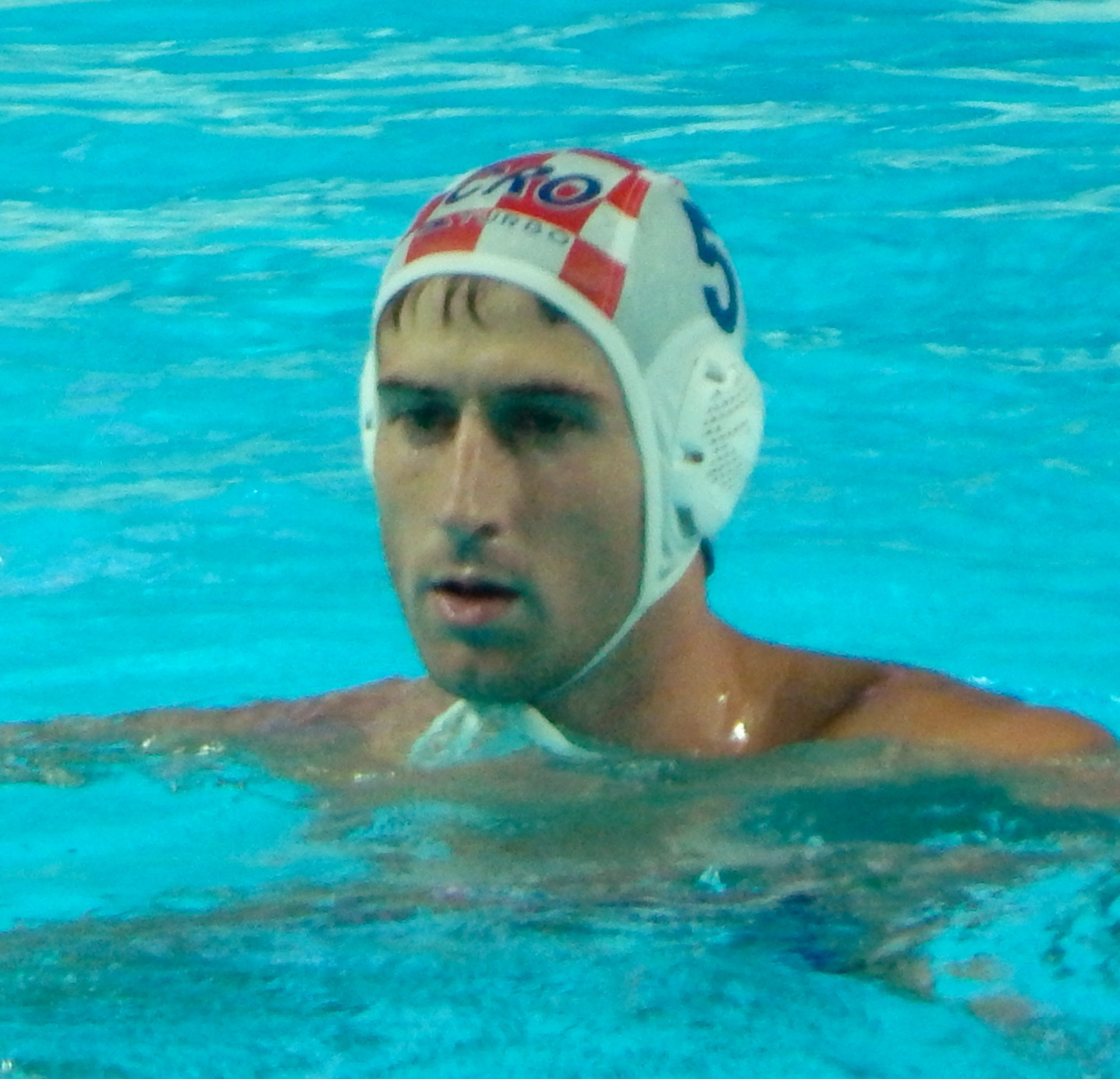
- Joković at the 2015 World Championships

Personal information
- Nationality: Croatian
- Born: 1 October 1987 (age 39) Dubrovnik, SR Croatia, SFR Yugoslavia
- Height: 2.03 m (6 ft 8 in)
- Weight: 95 kg (209 lb)

Sport
- Sport: Water polo
- Handedness: Left
- Position: Right Wing
- Current club: VK Jug

Senior clubs
- Years: Team
- 2004–2013: VK Jug
- 2013–2015: Pro Recco
- 2015–2019: VK Jug
- 2019–2020: Olympiacos
- 2020–2021: AN Brescia
- 2021–: VK Jug
National team
- Years: Team
- Croatia
Medal record
Men's water polo
Representing Croatia
Olympic Games
Gold medal – first place	2012 London	Team
Silver medal – second place	2016 Rio de Janeiro	Team
Silver medal – second place	2024 Paris	Team
World Championship
Gold medal – first place	2007 Melbourne	Team
Gold medal – first place	2017 Budapest	Team
Silver medal – second place	2015 Kazan	Team
Bronze medal – third place	2011 Shanghai	Team
Bronze medal – third place	2013 Barcelona	Team
Bronze medal – third place	2019 Gwanjgu	Team
European Championship
Gold medal – first place	2010 Zagreb
Bronze medal – third place	2018 Barcelona
World Cup
Silver medal – second place	2010 Oradea
Bronze medal – third place	2014 Kazakhstan
FINA World League
Gold medal – first place	2012 Almaty
Silver medal – second place	2019 Belgrade
Silver medal – second place	2015 Bergamo
Bronze medal – third place	2010 Niš
Bronze medal – third place	2011 Florence
Bronze medal – third place	2017 Ruza
Mediterranean Games
Gold medal – first place	2013 Mersin	Team

Maro Joković (born 1 October 1987) is a Croatian water polo player. He is left-handed and plays in the right wing position. He competed at the 2008, 2012, 2016, 2020 and 2024 Summer Olympics, winning a gold medal in 2012 and a silver in 2016 and 2024. He held the world title in 2007 and 2017 and the European title in 2010.

Joković took up water polo aged seven at a local club near Dubrovnik. At the age of 14, he joined VK Jug Dubrovnik. He is currently studying economics at the University of Dubrovnik. He is married to Maria and has three daughters. In 2013, he worked as a model for fashion designer Ivana Barač.

At club level, Joković plays for Croatian powerhouse Jug Dubrovnik.

In the summer of 2023, Maro joined San Giljan ASC to take part in the summer competitions for the Maltese champions alongside Pro Recco and Australia men's national water polo team star Aaron Younger

== Honours ==
=== Club ===
Jug Dubrovnik

- LEN Champions League: 2005–06, 2015–16; runners-up : 2006–07, 2007–08, 2012–13, 2016–17
- LEN Euro Cup: 2023–24
- LEN Super Cup: 2006, 2016
- Croatian Championship: 2003–04, 2004–05, 2005–06 2006–07, 2008–09, 2009–10, 2010–11 2011–12, 2012–13, 2015–16, 2016–17, 2017–18, 2018–19, 2021–22
- Adriatic League: 2009, 2016, 2017, 2018, 2023
- Croatian Cup: 2005–06, 2006–07, 2007–08, 2008–09, 2009–10, 2015–16, 2016–17, 2017–18, 2018–19, 2022–23
- Croatian Super Cup: 2022

Pro Recco

- LEN Champions League: 2014–15
- Serie A1: 2013–14, 2014–15
- Coppa Italia: 2013–14, 2014–15

Olympiacos

- Greek Championship: 2019–20
- Greek Cup: 2019–20
- Greek Super Cup: 2019

AN Brescia

- Serie A1: 2020–21

== Awards ==
- Swimming World Magazine's man water polo ''World Player of the Year " award: 2012
- Member of World Team by total-waterpolo: 2019
- Member of Second World Team of the Year's 2000–2020 by total-waterpolo
- LEN Champions League Right Winger of the Year: 2015–16, 2017–18
- Fourth Top European Player in the World by LEN: 2016
- World League Top Scorer: 2012
- Olympic Games 2012 Team of the Tournament
- Croatian Championship Top Scorer 2015–16 with Jug Dubrovnik
- Croatian Championship Top Scorer 2018–19 with Jug Dubrovnik
- Croatian Championship MVP 2018–19 with Jug Dubrovnik
- Croatian "Athlete of the Year ": 2018–19
- Best Croatian Right Wing of the Year: 2015, 2016, 2017, 2018, 2019, 2020, 2021
- 2019 World Championship Team of the Tournament
- Croatian Water Polo Player of the Year: 2020 with Olympiacos, 2021 with Jug Dubrovnik

== See also ==
- Croatia men's Olympic water polo team records and statistics
- List of Olympic champions in men's water polo
- List of Olympic medalists in water polo (men)
- List of world champions in men's water polo
- List of World Aquatics Championships medalists in water polo
- List of Swimming World Swimmers of the Year
