= VK Osijek =

Croatian water polo club

Water Polo Club Osijek
- Founded: 1946 (as VK Sloga)
- League: 1. B Croatian League
- Based in: Osijek, Croatia
- Arena: Gradski bazeni Osijek
- Colors
- President: Zoran Škorić
- Head coach: Bariša Petrović, Marko Lukenda, Nikica Bodulja
- Manager: Dejan Stojanović
- Website: www.vkkruna-osijek.com

VK Osijek (VK Kruna-Osijek) is a water polo club from Osijek, Croatia.

Currently, VK Osijek competes in the 1. B Croatian League of Water Polo.

VK Osijek was established in 1946 as "VK Sloga", as part of sports society "Sloga".
