= Nikola Milošević =

Nikola Milošević may refer to:

- Nikola Milošević (politician) (1929–2007), Serbian writer, political philosopher, literary critic, and politician
- Nikola Milošević (computer scientist) (born 1986), Serbian computer scientist
- Nikola Milošević (footballer, born 1993), Serbian football midfielder
- Nikola Milošević (footballer, born 1996), Serbian footballer
- Nikola Milošević (water polo) (born 2001), Croatian water polo player
- Nikola Milošević (handballer) (born 1994), Serbian handball player for RK Borac Banja Luka
- Nikola Milošević (sambo), Serbian sambo fighter at the 2013 Summer Universiade
