= Water polo at the 2017 World Aquatics Championships – Men's tournament =

Tournament details
- Venue: Hungary (in Budapest host cities)
- Dates: 17–29 July
- Teams: 16 (from 5 confederations)

Final positions
- Champions: Croatia (2nd title)
- Runners-up: Hungary
- Third place: Serbia
- Fourth place: Greece

Tournament statistics
- Matches played: 48
- Goals scored: 871 (18.15 per match)
- Top scorers: (Greece) Ioannis Fountoulis (23 goals)

Awards
- Best player: (Hungary) Márton Vámos

The men's water polo tournament at the 2017 World Aquatics Championships, organised by the FINA, was held in Budapest, Hungary from 17 to 29 July 2017.

Croatia captured their second title by defeating host Hungary 8–6 in the final match. Bronze was secured by Serbia who beat Greece 11–8.

== Participating teams ==
Africa	Americas	Asia	Europe	Oceania
South Africa	Brazil; Canada; United States	Japan; Kazakhstan	Croatia; France; Greece; Hungary; Italy; Montenegro; Russia; Serbia; Spain	Australia

=== Qualification ===
- Hungary qualified as host.
- Serbia and United States qualified as 2016 FINA World League finalists.
- Croatia, Italy, Montenegro and Greece qualified at the 2016 Olympic tournament
- Spain, Russia and France qualified at the 2016 European Championship.
- Brazil and Canada qualified at the 2017 UANA Cup.
- Japan and Kazakhstan qualified at the Asia tournament.
- South Africa qualified at the African tournament.
- Australia qualified at the Oceanian tournament.

=== Groups formed ===
The draw resulted in the following groups:

Group A	Group B	Group C	Group D
Brazil	Australia	Greece	Croatia
Canada	France	Serbia	Japan
Kazakhstan	Hungary	South Africa	Russia
Montenegro	Italy	Spain	United States

== Preliminary round ==
=== Group A ===
Pos	Team	Pld	W	D	L	GF	GA	GD	Pts	Qualification
1	Montenegro	3	2	1	0	35	18	+17	5	Quarterfinals
2	Brazil	3	1	1	1	17	22	−5	3	Playoffs
3	Kazakhstan	3	1	0	2	17	28	−11	2 (Note: Kazakhstan 10–9 Canada)	Playoffs
4	Canada	3	0	2	1	23	24	−1	2	

Source: Sportresult
Rules for classification: 1) points; 2) head-to-head points; 3) head-to-head goal difference; 4) head-to-head number of goals scored; 5) better result against higher placed team.
Notes:

17 July 2017; 09:30	Report	Brazil	6–2	Kazakhstan	Alfréd Hajós National Swimming Stadium, Budapest; Referees: Matan Schwartz (ISR), Yosuke Kajiwara (JPN)
17 July 2017; 09:30	Report	Score by quarters: 1–1, 0–1, 3–0, 2–0			Alfréd Hajós National Swimming Stadium, Budapest; Referees: Matan Schwartz (ISR), Yosuke Kajiwara (JPN)
17 July 2017; 09:30	Report	G. Guimarães 4	Goals	Turlykhanov, Ukumanov 1	Alfréd Hajós National Swimming Stadium, Budapest; Referees: Matan Schwartz (ISR), Yosuke Kajiwara (JPN)

17 July 2017; 17:05	Report	Montenegro	8–8	Canada	Alfréd Hajós National Swimming Stadium, Budapest; Referees: Georgios Stavridis (GRE), Francesc Buch (ESP)
17 July 2017; 17:05	Report	Score by quarters: 3–1, 2–2, 1–1, 2–4			Alfréd Hajós National Swimming Stadium, Budapest; Referees: Georgios Stavridis (GRE), Francesc Buch (ESP)
17 July 2017; 17:05	Report	Petković 3	Goals	three players 2	Alfréd Hajós National Swimming Stadium, Budapest; Referees: Georgios Stavridis (GRE), Francesc Buch (ESP)

19 July 2017; 18:30	Report	Canada	9–10	Kazakhstan	Alfréd Hajós National Swimming Stadium, Budapest; Referees: Georgios Stavridis (GRE), Nader Ghafouri (IRI)
19 July 2017; 18:30	Report	Score by quarters: 2–2, 3–3, 3–2, 1–3			Alfréd Hajós National Swimming Stadium, Budapest; Referees: Georgios Stavridis (GRE), Nader Ghafouri (IRI)
19 July 2017; 18:30	Report	Thumwood 4	Goals	Medvedev, Ukumanov 4	Alfréd Hajós National Swimming Stadium, Budapest; Referees: Georgios Stavridis (GRE), Nader Ghafouri (IRI)

19 July 2017; 21:30	Report	Brazil	5–14	Montenegro	Alfréd Hajós National Swimming Stadium, Budapest; Referees: Dion Willis (RSA), Yosuke Kajiwara (JPN)
19 July 2017; 21:30	Report	Score by quarters: 0–4, 2–3, 2–4, 1–3			Alfréd Hajós National Swimming Stadium, Budapest; Referees: Dion Willis (RSA), Yosuke Kajiwara (JPN)
19 July 2017; 21:30	Report	G. Guimarães 2	Goals	A. Radović 3	Alfréd Hajós National Swimming Stadium, Budapest; Referees: Dion Willis (RSA), Yosuke Kajiwara (JPN)

21 July 2017; 17:30	Report	Brazil	6–6	Canada	Alfréd Hajós National Swimming Stadium, Budapest; Referees: Andrej Franulović (CRO), Dion Willis (RSA)
21 July 2017; 17:30	Report	Score by quarters: 1–2, 3–2, 1–2, 1–0			Alfréd Hajós National Swimming Stadium, Budapest; Referees: Andrej Franulović (CRO), Dion Willis (RSA)
21 July 2017; 17:30	Report	Coutinho 2	Goals	six players 1	Alfréd Hajós National Swimming Stadium, Budapest; Referees: Andrej Franulović (CRO), Dion Willis (RSA)

21 July 2017; 18:05	Report	Montenegro	13–5	Kazakhstan	Alfréd Hajós National Swimming Stadium, Budapest; Referees: Georgios Stavridis (GRE), Steven Rotstart (USA)
21 July 2017; 18:05	Report	Score by quarters: 2–0, 4–0, 3–2, 4–3			Alfréd Hajós National Swimming Stadium, Budapest; Referees: Georgios Stavridis (GRE), Steven Rotstart (USA)
21 July 2017; 18:05	Report	Čučković 4	Goals	Ukumanov 2	Alfréd Hajós National Swimming Stadium, Budapest; Referees: Georgios Stavridis (GRE), Steven Rotstart (USA)

=== Group B ===
Pos	Team	Pld	W	D	L	GF	GA	GD	Pts	Qualification
1	Hungary (H)	3	2	1	0	35	19	+16	5 (Note: Hungary placed higher because of better goal difference against Australia.)	Quarterfinals
2	Italy	3	2	1	0	40	23	+17	5	Playoffs
3	Australia	3	1	0	2	19	36	−17	2	Playoffs
4	France	3	0	0	3	26	42	−16	0	

Source: Sportresult
Rules for classification: 1) points; 2) head-to-head points; 3) head-to-head goal difference; 4) head-to-head number of goals scored; 5) better result against higher placed team.
(H) Hosts
Notes:

17 July 2017; 12:30	Report	France	9–18	Italy	Alfréd Hajós National Swimming Stadium, Budapest; Referees: Vojin Putniković (SRB), Frank Ohme (GER)
17 July 2017; 12:30	Report	Score by quarters: 2–5, 4–3, 1–7, 2–3			Alfréd Hajós National Swimming Stadium, Budapest; Referees: Vojin Putniković (SRB), Frank Ohme (GER)
17 July 2017; 12:30	Report	Crousillat 3	Goals	Di Fulvio 5	Alfréd Hajós National Swimming Stadium, Budapest; Referees: Vojin Putniković (SRB), Frank Ohme (GER)

17 July 2017; 20:30	Report	Australia	3–13	Hungary	Alfréd Hajós National Swimming Stadium, Budapest; Referees: Andrej Franulović (CRO), Steven Rotsart (USA)
17 July 2017; 20:30	Report	Score by quarters: 1–1, 1–4, 1–2, 0–6			Alfréd Hajós National Swimming Stadium, Budapest; Referees: Andrej Franulović (CRO), Steven Rotsart (USA)
17 July 2017; 20:30	Report	three players 1	Goals	Varga 4	Alfréd Hajós National Swimming Stadium, Budapest; Referees: Andrej Franulović (CRO), Steven Rotsart (USA)

19 July 2017; 09:30	Report	France	10–11	Australia	Alfréd Hajós National Swimming Stadium, Budapest; Referees: Vojin Putniković (SRB), Andrej Franulović (CRO)
19 July 2017; 09:30	Report	Score by quarters: 5–4, 1–2, 1–3, 3–2			Alfréd Hajós National Swimming Stadium, Budapest; Referees: Vojin Putniković (SRB), Andrej Franulović (CRO)
19 July 2017; 09:30	Report	Crousillat 3	Goals	Younger 3	Alfréd Hajós National Swimming Stadium, Budapest; Referees: Vojin Putniković (SRB), Andrej Franulović (CRO)

19 July 2017; 20:30	Report	Hungary	9–9	Italy	Alfréd Hajós National Swimming Stadium, Budapest; Referees: Sergey Naumov (RUS), Matan Schwartz (ISR)
19 July 2017; 20:30	Report	Score by quarters: 4–4, 2–1, 1–3, 2–1			Alfréd Hajós National Swimming Stadium, Budapest; Referees: Sergey Naumov (RUS), Matan Schwartz (ISR)
19 July 2017; 20:30	Report	Varga, Vámos 3	Goals	Renzuto 3	Alfréd Hajós National Swimming Stadium, Budapest; Referees: Sergey Naumov (RUS), Matan Schwartz (ISR)

21 July 2017; 20:00	Report	France	7–13	Hungary	Alfréd Hajós National Swimming Stadium, Budapest; Referees: Radosław Koryzna (POL), Sergey Naumov (RUS)
21 July 2017; 20:00	Report	Score by quarters: 1–6, 3–2, 1–3, 2–2			Alfréd Hajós National Swimming Stadium, Budapest; Referees: Radosław Koryzna (POL), Sergey Naumov (RUS)
21 July 2017; 20:00	Report	Marzouki 4	Goals	Vámos 4	Alfréd Hajós National Swimming Stadium, Budapest; Referees: Radosław Koryzna (POL), Sergey Naumov (RUS)

21 July 2017; 21:30	Report	Australia	5–13	Italy	Alfréd Hajós National Swimming Stadium, Budapest; Referees: Francesc Buch (ESP), Stanko Ivanovski (MNE)
21 July 2017; 21:30	Report	Score by quarters: 2–5, 0–3, 3–2, 0–3			Alfréd Hajós National Swimming Stadium, Budapest; Referees: Francesc Buch (ESP), Stanko Ivanovski (MNE)
21 July 2017; 21:30	Report	five players 1	Goals	Figlioli, Bodegas 3	Alfréd Hajós National Swimming Stadium, Budapest; Referees: Francesc Buch (ESP), Stanko Ivanovski (MNE)

=== Group C ===
Pos	Team	Pld	W	D	L	GF	GA	GD	Pts	Qualification
1	Serbia	3	3	0	0	43	16	+27	6	Quarterfinals
2	Greece	3	2	0	1	32	20	+12	4	Playoffs
3	Spain	3	1	0	2	28	23	+5	2	Playoffs
4	South Africa	3	0	0	3	11	55	−44	0	

Source: Sportresult
Rules for classification: 1) points; 2) head-to-head points; 3) head-to-head goal difference; 4) head-to-head number of goals scored; 5) better result against higher placed team.

17 July 2017; 13:00	Report	Spain	7–8	Greece	Alfréd Hajós National Swimming Stadium, Budapest; Referees: Radosław Koryzna (POL), Péter Molnár (HUN)
17 July 2017; 13:00	Report	Score by quarters: 1–3, 2–2, 1–1, 3–2			Alfréd Hajós National Swimming Stadium, Budapest; Referees: Radosław Koryzna (POL), Péter Molnár (HUN)
17 July 2017; 13:00	Report	Mallarach 2	Goals	Fountoulis, Vlachopoulos 2	Alfréd Hajós National Swimming Stadium, Budapest; Referees: Radosław Koryzna (POL), Péter Molnár (HUN)

17 July 2017; 17:30	Report	Serbia	21–5	South Africa	Alfréd Hajós National Swimming Stadium, Budapest; Referees: Michael Brooks (NZL), Nader Ghafouri (IRI)
17 July 2017; 17:30	Report	Score by quarters: 6–1, 7–1, 5–1, 3–2			Alfréd Hajós National Swimming Stadium, Budapest; Referees: Michael Brooks (NZL), Nader Ghafouri (IRI)
17 July 2017; 17:30	Report	three players 3	Goals	Le Roux 2	Alfréd Hajós National Swimming Stadium, Budapest; Referees: Michael Brooks (NZL), Nader Ghafouri (IRI)

19 July 2017; 10:30	Report	South Africa	2–18	Greece	Alfréd Hajós National Swimming Stadium, Budapest; Referees: Péter Molnár (HUN), Maged El Shamy (AUS)
19 July 2017; 10:30	Report	Score by quarters: 0–5, 2–3, 0–5, 0–5			Alfréd Hajós National Swimming Stadium, Budapest; Referees: Péter Molnár (HUN), Maged El Shamy (AUS)
19 July 2017; 10:30	Report	Le Roux, Molyneux 1	Goals	Fountoulis 6	Alfréd Hajós National Swimming Stadium, Budapest; Referees: Péter Molnár (HUN), Maged El Shamy (AUS)

19 July 2017; 15:45	Report	Spain	5–11	Serbia	Alfréd Hajós National Swimming Stadium, Budapest; Referees: Adrian Alexandrescu (ROU), Mikhail Dykman (CAN)
19 July 2017; 15:45	Report	Score by quarters: 1–3, 0–2, 2–3, 2–3			Alfréd Hajós National Swimming Stadium, Budapest; Referees: Adrian Alexandrescu (ROU), Mikhail Dykman (CAN)
19 July 2017; 15:45	Report	Bustos 2	Goals	three players 2	Alfréd Hajós National Swimming Stadium, Budapest; Referees: Adrian Alexandrescu (ROU), Mikhail Dykman (CAN)

21 July 2017; 09:30	Report	Spain	16–4	South Africa	Alfréd Hajós National Swimming Stadium, Budapest; Referees: Ni Shiwei (CHN), Michael Brooks (NZL)
21 July 2017; 09:30	Report	Score by quarters: 3–2, 1–0, 6–1, 6–1			Alfréd Hajós National Swimming Stadium, Budapest; Referees: Ni Shiwei (CHN), Michael Brooks (NZL)
21 July 2017; 09:30	Report	three players 3	Goals	four players 1	Alfréd Hajós National Swimming Stadium, Budapest; Referees: Ni Shiwei (CHN), Michael Brooks (NZL)

21 July 2017; 17:45	Report	Serbia	11–6	Greece	Alfréd Hajós National Swimming Stadium, Budapest; Referees: Péter Molnár (HUN), Frank Ohme (GER)
21 July 2017; 17:45	Report	Score by quarters: 2–1, 3–3, 3–0, 3–2			Alfréd Hajós National Swimming Stadium, Budapest; Referees: Péter Molnár (HUN), Frank Ohme (GER)
21 July 2017; 17:45	Report	Filipović 3	Goals	Delakas, Fountoulis 2	Alfréd Hajós National Swimming Stadium, Budapest; Referees: Péter Molnár (HUN), Frank Ohme (GER)

=== Group D ===
Pos	Team	Pld	W	D	L	GF	GA	GD	Pts	Qualification
1	Croatia	3	3	0	0	38	21	+17	6	Quarterfinals
2	Russia	3	1	0	2	34	32	+2	2 (Note: Russia 2 Pts, +4 GD; Japan 2 Pts, +1 GD; United States 2 Pts, −5 GD)	Playoffs
3	Japan	3	1	0	2	29	38	−9	2	Playoffs
4	United States	3	1	0	2	28	38	−10	2	

Source: Sportresult
Rules for classification: 1) points; 2) head-to-head points; 3) head-to-head goal difference; 4) head-to-head number of goals scored; 5) better result against higher placed team.
Notes:

17 July 2017; 18:50	Report	United States	7–12	Croatia	Alfréd Hajós National Swimming Stadium, Budapest; Referees: Adrian Alexandrescu (ROU), Alessandro Severo (ITA)
17 July 2017; 18:50	Report	Score by quarters: 1–3, 2–4, 1–3, 3–2			Alfréd Hajós National Swimming Stadium, Budapest; Referees: Adrian Alexandrescu (ROU), Alessandro Severo (ITA)
17 July 2017; 18:50	Report	Bowen, Cupido 2	Goals	García, Lončar 4	Alfréd Hajós National Swimming Stadium, Budapest; Referees: Adrian Alexandrescu (ROU), Alessandro Severo (ITA)

17 July 2017; 21:30	Report	Japan	8–15	Russia	Alfréd Hajós National Swimming Stadium, Budapest; Referees: Daniel Flahive (AUS), Stanko Ivanovski (MNE)
17 July 2017; 21:30	Report	Score by quarters: 1–5, 2–3, 2–3, 3–4			Alfréd Hajós National Swimming Stadium, Budapest; Referees: Daniel Flahive (AUS), Stanko Ivanovski (MNE)
17 July 2017; 21:30	Report	three players 2	Goals	four players 3	Alfréd Hajós National Swimming Stadium, Budapest; Referees: Daniel Flahive (AUS), Stanko Ivanovski (MNE)

19 July 2017; 13:30	Report	Russia	8–10	Croatia	Alfréd Hajós National Swimming Stadium, Budapest; Referees: Radosław Koryzna (POL), Frank Ohme (GER)
19 July 2017; 13:30	Report	Score by quarters: 3–1, 3–3, 1–4, 1–2			Alfréd Hajós National Swimming Stadium, Budapest; Referees: Radosław Koryzna (POL), Frank Ohme (GER)
19 July 2017; 13:30	Report	Lisunov 2	Goals	Joković 4	Alfréd Hajós National Swimming Stadium, Budapest; Referees: Radosław Koryzna (POL), Frank Ohme (GER)

19 July 2017; 17:30	Report	United States	7–15	Japan	Alfréd Hajós National Swimming Stadium, Budapest; Referees: Daniel Flahive (AUS), Benjamin Mercier (FRA)
19 July 2017; 17:30	Report	Score by quarters: 2–1, 2–5, 2–4, 1–5			Alfréd Hajós National Swimming Stadium, Budapest; Referees: Daniel Flahive (AUS), Benjamin Mercier (FRA)
19 July 2017; 17:30	Report	Dunstan, Hallock 2	Goals	Adachi 7	Alfréd Hajós National Swimming Stadium, Budapest; Referees: Daniel Flahive (AUS), Benjamin Mercier (FRA)

21 July 2017; 12:10	Report	United States	14–11	Russia	Alfréd Hajós National Swimming Stadium, Budapest; Referees: Alessandro Severo (ITA), Matan Schwartz (ISR)
21 July 2017; 12:10	Report	Score by quarters: 6–1, 3–5, 3–1, 2–4			Alfréd Hajós National Swimming Stadium, Budapest; Referees: Alessandro Severo (ITA), Matan Schwartz (ISR)
21 July 2017; 12:10	Report	Bowen, Cupido 4	Goals	four players 2	Alfréd Hajós National Swimming Stadium, Budapest; Referees: Alessandro Severo (ITA), Matan Schwartz (ISR)

21 July 2017; 13:30	Report	Japan	6–16	Croatia	Alfréd Hajós National Swimming Stadium, Budapest; Referees: Daniel Flahive (AUS), Benjamin Mercier (FRA)
21 July 2017; 13:30	Report	Score by quarters: 1–5, 3–5, 1–4, 1–2			Alfréd Hajós National Swimming Stadium, Budapest; Referees: Daniel Flahive (AUS), Benjamin Mercier (FRA)
21 July 2017; 13:30	Report	Arai 2	Goals	four players 3	Alfréd Hajós National Swimming Stadium, Budapest; Referees: Daniel Flahive (AUS), Benjamin Mercier (FRA)

== Knockout stage ==
=== Bracket ===
Championship bracket

Playoffs
23 July
Greece	14
Japan	4
23 July
Spain	10
Russia	11
23 July
Brazil	3
Australia	8
23 July
Kazakhstan	7
Italy	12

Quarterfinals
25 July
Greece	12
Montenegro	7
25 July
Hungary	14
Russia	5
25 July
Serbia	15
Australia	5
25 July
Croatia	12
Italy	9

Semifinals
27 July
Greece	5
Hungary	7
27 July
Serbia	11
Croatia	12

Final
29 July
Hungary	6
Croatia	8
Third place game
29 July
Greece	8
Serbia	11

5th place bracket

5th–8th place semifinals
27 July
Montenegro	9
Russia	8
27 July
Australia	4
Italy	8

Fifth place game
29 July
Montenegro	5
Italy	4
Seventh place game
29 July
Russia	7
Australia	10

9th place bracket

9th–12th place semifinals
25 July
Japan	9
Brazil	7
25 July
Kazakhstan	6
Spain	18

Ninth place game
27 July
Japan	11
Spain	13
Eleventh place game
27 July
Brazil	5
Kazakhstan	9

13th place bracket

13th–16th place semifinals
23 July
France	10
Canada	6
23 July
South Africa	4
United States	13

13th place game
25 July
France	8
United States	11
15th place game
25 July
Canada	9
South Africa	6

=== Playoffs ===
23 July 2017; 13:30	Report	Brazil	3–8	Australia	Alfréd Hajós National Swimming Stadium, Budapest; Referees: Georgios Stavridis (GRE), Andrej Franulović (CRO)
23 July 2017; 13:30	Report	Score by quarters: 2–2, 0–2, 1–2, 0–2			Alfréd Hajós National Swimming Stadium, Budapest; Referees: Georgios Stavridis (GRE), Andrej Franulović (CRO)
23 July 2017; 13:30	Report	G. Guimarães 2	Goals	Kayes 3	Alfréd Hajós National Swimming Stadium, Budapest; Referees: Georgios Stavridis (GRE), Andrej Franulović (CRO)

23 July 2017; 15:00	Report	Kazakhstan	7–12	Italy	Alfréd Hajós National Swimming Stadium, Budapest; Referees: Péter Molnár (HUN), Nader Ghafouri (IRI)
23 July 2017; 15:00	Report	Score by quarters: 1–3, 1–2, 1–4, 4–3			Alfréd Hajós National Swimming Stadium, Budapest; Referees: Péter Molnár (HUN), Nader Ghafouri (IRI)
23 July 2017; 15:00	Report	Shakenov 3	Goals	Mirarchi, Renzuto 3	Alfréd Hajós National Swimming Stadium, Budapest; Referees: Péter Molnár (HUN), Nader Ghafouri (IRI)

23 July 2017; 20:30	Report	Greece	14–4	Japan	Alfréd Hajós National Swimming Stadium, Budapest; Referees: Frank Ohme (GER), Steven Rotsart (USA)
23 July 2017; 20:30	Report	Score by quarters: 5–2, 5–0, 2–2, 2–0			Alfréd Hajós National Swimming Stadium, Budapest; Referees: Frank Ohme (GER), Steven Rotsart (USA)
23 July 2017; 20:30	Report	Fountoulis 4	Goals	Adachi 2	Alfréd Hajós National Swimming Stadium, Budapest; Referees: Frank Ohme (GER), Steven Rotsart (USA)

23 July 2017; 22:00	Report	Spain	10–11	Russia	Alfréd Hajós National Swimming Stadium, Budapest; Referees: Adrian Alexandrescu (ROU), Vojin Putniković (SRB)
23 July 2017; 22:00	Report	Score by quarters: 2–3, 2–4, 3–3, 3–1			Alfréd Hajós National Swimming Stadium, Budapest; Referees: Adrian Alexandrescu (ROU), Vojin Putniković (SRB)
23 July 2017; 22:00	Report	Tahull 4	Goals	Lisunov, Merkulov 3	Alfréd Hajós National Swimming Stadium, Budapest; Referees: Adrian Alexandrescu (ROU), Vojin Putniković (SRB)

=== Quarterfinals ===
25 July 2017; 15:30	Report	Montenegro	7–12	Greece	Alfréd Hajós National Swimming Stadium, Budapest; Referees: Adrian Alexandrescu (ROU), Daniel Flahive (AUS)
25 July 2017; 15:30	Report	Score by quarters: 0–1, 2–5, 1–4, 4–2			Alfréd Hajós National Swimming Stadium, Budapest; Referees: Adrian Alexandrescu (ROU), Daniel Flahive (AUS)
25 July 2017; 15:30	Report	A. Radović 2	Goals	Fountoulis 4	Alfréd Hajós National Swimming Stadium, Budapest; Referees: Adrian Alexandrescu (ROU), Daniel Flahive (AUS)

25 July 2017; 16:15	Report	Serbia	15–5	Australia	Alfréd Hajós National Swimming Stadium, Budapest; Referees: Sergey Naumov (RUS), Frank Ohme (GER)
25 July 2017; 16:15	Report	Score by quarters: 4–1, 4–2, 4–2, 3–0			Alfréd Hajós National Swimming Stadium, Budapest; Referees: Sergey Naumov (RUS), Frank Ohme (GER)
25 July 2017; 16:15	Report	Filipović 3	Goals	five players 1	Alfréd Hajós National Swimming Stadium, Budapest; Referees: Sergey Naumov (RUS), Frank Ohme (GER)

25 July 2017; 20:30	Report	Hungary	14–5	Russia	Alfréd Hajós National Swimming Stadium, Budapest; Referees: Alessandro Severo (ITA), Francesc Buch (ESP)
25 July 2017; 20:30	Report	Score by quarters: 5–0, 3–1, 3–3, 3–1			Alfréd Hajós National Swimming Stadium, Budapest; Referees: Alessandro Severo (ITA), Francesc Buch (ESP)
25 July 2017; 20:30	Report	Hosnyánszky, Varga 4	Goals	Bugaychuk 2	Alfréd Hajós National Swimming Stadium, Budapest; Referees: Alessandro Severo (ITA), Francesc Buch (ESP)

25 July 2017; 22:00	Report	Croatia	12–9	Italy	Alfréd Hajós National Swimming Stadium, Budapest; Referees: Georgios Stavridis (GRE), Matan Schwartz (ISR)
25 July 2017; 22:00	Report	Score by quarters: 3–2, 2–3, 3–1, 4–3			Alfréd Hajós National Swimming Stadium, Budapest; Referees: Georgios Stavridis (GRE), Matan Schwartz (ISR)
25 July 2017; 22:00	Report	García, Sukno 4	Goals	Renzuto 3	Alfréd Hajós National Swimming Stadium, Budapest; Referees: Georgios Stavridis (GRE), Matan Schwartz (ISR)

=== 13th–16th place semifinals ===
23 July 2017; 10:30	Report	Canada	6–10	France	Alfréd Hajós National Swimming Stadium, Budapest; Referees: Stanko Ivanovski (MNE), Matan Schwartz (ISR)
23 July 2017; 10:30	Report	Score by quarters: 4–3, 1–2, 1–2, 0–3			Alfréd Hajós National Swimming Stadium, Budapest; Referees: Stanko Ivanovski (MNE), Matan Schwartz (ISR)
23 July 2017; 10:30	Report	Thumwood 2	Goals	Crousillat, Marzouki 3	Alfréd Hajós National Swimming Stadium, Budapest; Referees: Stanko Ivanovski (MNE), Matan Schwartz (ISR)

23 July 2017; 12:00	Report	South Africa	4–13	United States	Alfréd Hajós National Swimming Stadium, Budapest; Referees: Radosław Koryzna (POL), Maged El-Shamy (EGY)
23 July 2017; 12:00	Report	Score by quarters: 0–1, 3–6, 1–3, 0–3			Alfréd Hajós National Swimming Stadium, Budapest; Referees: Radosław Koryzna (POL), Maged El-Shamy (EGY)
23 July 2017; 12:00	Report	four players 1	Goals	Irving, Obert 3	Alfréd Hajós National Swimming Stadium, Budapest; Referees: Radosław Koryzna (POL), Maged El-Shamy (EGY)

=== 9th–12th place semifinals ===
25 July 2017; 12:10	Report	Brazil	7–9	Japan	Alfréd Hajós National Swimming Stadium, Budapest; Referees: Diana Dutilh-Dumas (NED), Radosław Koryzna (POL)
25 July 2017; 12:10	Report	Score by quarters: 1–3, 3–4, 1–1, 2–1			Alfréd Hajós National Swimming Stadium, Budapest; Referees: Diana Dutilh-Dumas (NED), Radosław Koryzna (POL)
25 July 2017; 12:10	Report	Coutinho, Freitas 2	Goals	Adachi 3	Alfréd Hajós National Swimming Stadium, Budapest; Referees: Diana Dutilh-Dumas (NED), Radosław Koryzna (POL)

25 July 2017; 13:30	Report	Kazakhstan	6–18	Spain	Alfréd Hajós National Swimming Stadium, Budapest; Referees: Mikhail Dykman (CAN), Stanko Ivanovski (MNE)
25 July 2017; 13:30	Report	Score by quarters: 0–4, 1–5, 1–3, 4–6			Alfréd Hajós National Swimming Stadium, Budapest; Referees: Mikhail Dykman (CAN), Stanko Ivanovski (MNE)
25 July 2017; 13:30	Report	Shakenov 4	Goals	Barroso 5	Alfréd Hajós National Swimming Stadium, Budapest; Referees: Mikhail Dykman (CAN), Stanko Ivanovski (MNE)

=== 5th–8th place semifinals ===
27 July 2017; 13:30	Report	Montenegro	9–8	Russia	Alfréd Hajós National Swimming Stadium, Budapest; Referees: Georgios Stavridis (GRE), Radosław Koryzna (POL)
27 July 2017; 13:30	Report	Score by quarters: 1–1, 4–2, 2–4, 2–1			Alfréd Hajós National Swimming Stadium, Budapest; Referees: Georgios Stavridis (GRE), Radosław Koryzna (POL)
27 July 2017; 13:30	Report	Dr. Brguljan 4	Goals	Lisunov, Merkulov 2	Alfréd Hajós National Swimming Stadium, Budapest; Referees: Georgios Stavridis (GRE), Radosław Koryzna (POL)

27 July 2017; 15:00	Report	Australia	4–8	Italy	Alfréd Hajós National Swimming Stadium, Budapest; Referees: Péter Molnár (HUN), Vojin Putniković (SRB)
27 July 2017; 15:00	Report	Score by quarters: 2–4, 2–2, 1–1, 0–2			Alfréd Hajós National Swimming Stadium, Budapest; Referees: Péter Molnár (HUN), Vojin Putniković (SRB)
27 July 2017; 15:00	Report	Hollis 2	Goals	Di Fulvio, Figlioli 2	Alfréd Hajós National Swimming Stadium, Budapest; Referees: Péter Molnár (HUN), Vojin Putniković (SRB)

=== Semifinals ===
27 July 2017; 20:30	Report	Greece	5–7	Hungary	Alfréd Hajós National Swimming Stadium, Budapest; Referees: Sergey Naumov (RUS), Francesc Buch (ESP)
27 July 2017; 20:30	Report	Score by quarters: 1–2, 3–3, 0–1, 1–1			Alfréd Hajós National Swimming Stadium, Budapest; Referees: Sergey Naumov (RUS), Francesc Buch (ESP)
27 July 2017; 20:30	Report	Genidounias 3	Goals	Hosnyánszky, Vámos 2	Alfréd Hajós National Swimming Stadium, Budapest; Referees: Sergey Naumov (RUS), Francesc Buch (ESP)

27 July 2017; 22:00	Report	Serbia	11–12	Croatia	Alfréd Hajós National Swimming Stadium, Budapest; Referees: Steven Rotsart (USA), Adrian Alexandrescu (ROU)
27 July 2017; 22:00	Report	Score by quarters: 1–1, 4–4, 4–4, 2–3			Alfréd Hajós National Swimming Stadium, Budapest; Referees: Steven Rotsart (USA), Adrian Alexandrescu (ROU)
27 July 2017; 22:00	Report	Prlainović 6	Goals	Joković, Sukno 3	Alfréd Hajós National Swimming Stadium, Budapest; Referees: Steven Rotsart (USA), Adrian Alexandrescu (ROU)

=== 15th place game ===
25 July 2017; 09:30	Report	Canada	9–6	South Africa	Alfréd Hajós National Swimming Stadium, Budapest; Referees: Diego Garibaldi (ARG), Michael Brooks (NZL)
25 July 2017; 09:30	Report	Score by quarters: 1–2, 4–1, 2–1, 2–2			Alfréd Hajós National Swimming Stadium, Budapest; Referees: Diego Garibaldi (ARG), Michael Brooks (NZL)
25 July 2017; 09:30	Report	Constantin-Bicari 5	Goals	Le Roux 2	Alfréd Hajós National Swimming Stadium, Budapest; Referees: Diego Garibaldi (ARG), Michael Brooks (NZL)

=== 13th place game ===
25 July 2017; 10:50	Report	France	8–11	United States	Alfréd Hajós National Swimming Stadium, Budapest; Referees: Péter Molnár (HUN), Viktor Salnichenko (KAZ)
25 July 2017; 10:50	Report	Score by quarters: 1–0, 2–3, 3–4, 2–4			Alfréd Hajós National Swimming Stadium, Budapest; Referees: Péter Molnár (HUN), Viktor Salnichenko (KAZ)
25 July 2017; 10:50	Report	Crousillat, Marzouki 2	Goals	Cupido 3	Alfréd Hajós National Swimming Stadium, Budapest; Referees: Péter Molnár (HUN), Viktor Salnichenko (KAZ)

=== Eleventh place game ===
27 July 2017; 10:30	Report	Brazil	5–9	Kazakhstan	Alfréd Hajós National Swimming Stadium, Budapest; Referees: Andrej Franulović (CRO), Nader Ghafouri (IRI)
27 July 2017; 10:30	Report	Score by quarters: 1–4, 2–2, 0–1, 2–2			Alfréd Hajós National Swimming Stadium, Budapest; Referees: Andrej Franulović (CRO), Nader Ghafouri (IRI)
27 July 2017; 10:30	Report	Coutinho 2	Goals	Shakenov, Ukumanov 2	Alfréd Hajós National Swimming Stadium, Budapest; Referees: Andrej Franulović (CRO), Nader Ghafouri (IRI)

=== Ninth place game ===
27 July 2017; 12:00	Report	Japan	11–13	Spain	Alfréd Hajós National Swimming Stadium, Budapest; Referees: Stanko Ivanovski (MNE), Viktor Salnichenko (KAZ)
27 July 2017; 12:00	Report	Score by quarters: 2–1, 4–6, 3–4, 2–2			Alfréd Hajós National Swimming Stadium, Budapest; Referees: Stanko Ivanovski (MNE), Viktor Salnichenko (KAZ)
27 July 2017; 12:00	Report	Adachi, Okawa 3	Goals	Español 5	Alfréd Hajós National Swimming Stadium, Budapest; Referees: Stanko Ivanovski (MNE), Viktor Salnichenko (KAZ)

=== Seventh place game ===
29 July 2017; 12:00	Report	Russia	7–10	Australia	Alfréd Hajós National Swimming Stadium, Budapest; Referees: Stanko Ivanovski (MNE), Frank Ohme (GER)
29 July 2017; 12:00	Report	Score by quarters: 3–4, 2–2, 1–3, 1–1			Alfréd Hajós National Swimming Stadium, Budapest; Referees: Stanko Ivanovski (MNE), Frank Ohme (GER)
29 July 2017; 12:00	Report	Kholod 3	Goals	Younger 2	Alfréd Hajós National Swimming Stadium, Budapest; Referees: Stanko Ivanovski (MNE), Frank Ohme (GER)

=== Fifth place game ===
29 July 2017; 13:30	Report	Montenegro	5–4	Italy	Alfréd Hajós National Swimming Stadium, Budapest; Referees: Georgios Stavridis (GRE), Francesc Buch (ESP)
29 July 2017; 13:30	Report	Score by quarters: 1–1, 1–1, 3–2, 0–0			Alfréd Hajós National Swimming Stadium, Budapest; Referees: Georgios Stavridis (GRE), Francesc Buch (ESP)
29 July 2017; 13:30	Report	Dr. Brguljan 3	Goals	Mirarchi 2	Alfréd Hajós National Swimming Stadium, Budapest; Referees: Georgios Stavridis (GRE), Francesc Buch (ESP)

=== Third place game ===
29 July 2017; 15:00	Report	Greece	8–11	Serbia	Alfréd Hajós National Swimming Stadium, Budapest; Referees: Sergey Naumov (RUS), Benjamin Mercier (FRA)
29 July 2017; 15:00	Report	Score by quarters: 3–5, 1–2, 3–3, 1–1			Alfréd Hajós National Swimming Stadium, Budapest; Referees: Sergey Naumov (RUS), Benjamin Mercier (FRA)
29 July 2017; 15:00	Report	Fountoulis 3	Goals	D. Pijetlović, Ranđelović 2	Alfréd Hajós National Swimming Stadium, Budapest; Referees: Sergey Naumov (RUS), Benjamin Mercier (FRA)

=== Final ===
29 July 2017; 20:30	Report	Hungary	6–8	Croatia	Alfréd Hajós National Swimming Stadium, Budapest; Referees: Adrian Alexandrescu (ROU), Alessandro Severo (ITA)
29 July 2017; 20:30	Report	Score by quarters: 0–4, 2–0, 2–2, 2–2			Alfréd Hajós National Swimming Stadium, Budapest; Referees: Adrian Alexandrescu (ROU), Alessandro Severo (ITA)
29 July 2017; 20:30	Report	Vámos 3	Goals	Sukno 3	Alfréd Hajós National Swimming Stadium, Budapest; Referees: Adrian Alexandrescu (ROU), Alessandro Severo (ITA)

== Final standing ==
Rank	Team
1st place, gold medalist(s)	Croatia
2nd place, silver medalist(s)	Hungary
3rd place, bronze medalist(s)	Serbia
4	Greece
5	Montenegro
6	Italy
7	Australia
8	Russia
9	Spain
10	Japan
11	Kazakhstan
12	Brazil
13	United States
14	France
15	Canada
16	South Africa

2017 FINA Men's World champions

Croatia
Second title

Team Roster

Marko Bijač, Marko Macan, Loren Fatović, Luka Lončar, Maro Joković, Ivan Buljubašić, Ante Vukičević, Andro Bušlje, Sandro Sukno, Ivan Krapić, Anđelo Šetka, Xavier García, and Ivan Marcelić
Head coach: Ivica Tucak.

== Medalists ==
Gold	Silver	Bronze
Croatia Marko Bijač; Marko Macan; Loren Fatović; Luka Lončar; Maro Joković; Ivan Buljubašić; Ante Vukičević; Andro Bušlje; Sandro Sukno (c); Ivan Krapić; Anđelo Šetka; Xavier García; Ivan Marcelić Head coach: Ivica Tucak	Hungary Viktor Nagy; Béla Török; Krisztián Manhercz; Gergő Zalánki; Márton Vámos; Norbert Hosnyánszky; Miklós Gór-Nagy; Ádám Decker; Balázs Erdélyi; Dénes Varga (c); Tamás Mezei; Balázs Hárai; Attila Decker Head coach: Tamás Märcz	Serbia Gojko Pijetlović; Dušan Mandić; Viktor Rašović; Sava Ranđelović; Miloš Ćuk; Duško Pijetlović; Nemanja Ubović; Milan Aleksić; Nikola Jakšić; Filip Filipović (c); Andrija Prlainović; Stefan Mitrović; Branislav Mitrović Head coach: Dejan Savić

== Statistics and awards ==
=== Top goalscorers ===
Rank	Name	Goals	Shots	%
1	(Greece) Ioannis Fountoulis	23	55	42
2	(Croatia) Sandro Sukno	16	28	57
2	(Hungary) Márton Vámos	16	32	50
2	(Japan) Seiya Adachi	16	37	43
5	(Serbia) Andrija Prlainović	15	30	50
6	(Hungary) Dénes Varga	14	31	45
6	(Italy) Francesco Di Fulvio	14	42	33
8	(France) Mehdi Marzouki	13	34	38
8	(Italy) Vincenzo Renzuto	13	29	45
8	(Russia) Sergey Lisunov	13	27	48
8	(Russia) Daniil Merkulov	13	30	43

Source: SportResult

=== Awards ===
Most Valuable Player

- (Hungary) Márton Vámos

Best Goalscorer

- (Greece) Ioannis Fountoulis – 23 goals

Media All-Star Team

- (Hungary) Viktor Nagy – Goalkeeper
- (Croatia) Luka Lončar – Centre forward
- (Italy) Francesco Di Fulvio
- (Greece) Ioannis Fountoulis
- (Serbia) Andrija Prlainović
- (Croatia) Sandro Sukno
- (Hungary) Márton Vámos
