= Marijan Žužej =

Croatian water polo player (1934–2011)

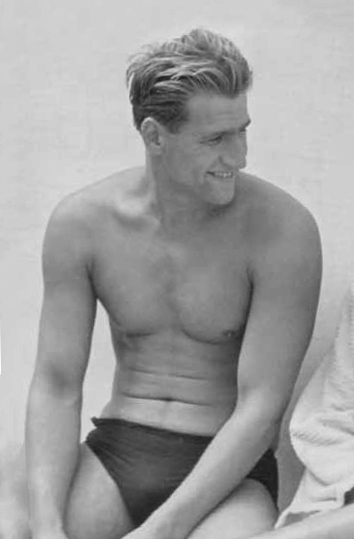
- Žužej in 1956

Personal information
- Born: 8 February 1934 Maribor, Drava Banovina, Kingdom of Yugoslavia
- Died: 18 December 2011 (aged 77) Zagreb, Croatia
- Height: 186 cm (6 ft 1 in)
- Weight: 93 kg (205 lb)

Sport
- Sport: Water polo
- Club: HAVK Mladost
Medal record
Representing Yugoslavia
Olympic Games
Silver medal – second place	1956 Melbourne	Team
European Water Polo Championships
Silver medal – second place	1954 Turin	Team

Marijan Žužej (8 February 1934 – 18 December 2011) was a Croatian water polo player of Slovenian origin. He was part of the Yugoslavia teams that won a silver medal at the 1956 Olympics and placed fourth in 1960.

Žužej was born in Maribor to Slovenian parents and lost his father at early age. His mother and stepfather were doctors and fought with Yugoslav partisans during World War II. Žužej took up swimming and water polo in 1946, and in 1954 was included to the Yugoslav national team that won a bronze medal at European championships. In late 1957 he had a serious car accident. He recovered by the 1960 Olympics, but retired from competitions after that to become a water polo coach and administrator at his club HAVK Mladost. Besides water polo he worked as an architect in Slovenia and Austria.

== See also ==
- List of Olympic medalists in water polo (men)
