= COMEN Cup =

Water polo competition in Europe

The COMEN (COnfederación MEditerránea de Natación) Cup was a competition in the sport of water polo, organized by the Mediterranean Swimming Confederation the period from 1984 to 2007. Participating clubs came primarily from European, African and Asian countries bordering the shores of the Mediterranean Sea like Spain, France, Italy, Malta, Greece, Cyprus, Egypt, Yugoslavia (and after Yugolslavia's split, Croatia, Montenegro and Serbia).

== Title holders ==
- 1984 (Socialist Federal Republic of Yugoslavia) POŠK
- 1985 (Socialist Federal Republic of Yugoslavia) POŠK
- 1986 (Socialist Federal Republic of Yugoslavia) POŠK
- 1987 (Socialist Federal Republic of Yugoslavia) Mladost
- 1988 Not held
- 1989 (Socialist Federal Republic of Yugoslavia) Partizan
- 1990 (Socialist Federal Republic of Yugoslavia) Mladost
- 1991 (Socialist Federal Republic of Yugoslavia) Jadran Split
- 1992 (Italy) Volturno
- 1993 Not held
- 1994 (Italy) Como
- 1995 (Croatia) Jadran Split
- 1996 (Croatia) VK Primorje Rijeka
- 1997 Not held
- 1998 (Croatia) Dubrovnik
- 1999 Not held
- 2000 (Italy) Ortigia
- 2001 (Italy) Ortigia
- 2002 (Italy) Camogli
- 2003-06 Not held
- 2007 (Italy) Sori
