= VK Mornar =

- Official logo
- Founded: 1949; 77 years ago
- League: Croatian League; Regional League A1
- Based in: Split, Croatia
- Head coach: Danijel Burić
- Website: vkmornar-brodospas.hr

Vaterpolski klub Mornar is a professional water polo club based in Split, Croatia. As of 2021–22 season, it competes in the Croatian League and Regional League A1.

== History ==
The club founded in 1949 under the name "Plivačko-vaterpolski klub Mornar" and the golden age for this team has coincided with the period between 1950 and 1961, when it won 5 times the Yugoslav League. The Mornar was regularly found at the top of the standings.

In 1987 Mornar won the first international title in its history, the LEN Cup Winners' Cup, defeating in the final the Spanish nautical club Catalunya. thanks to the playing quality that had the following roster: Deni Marinković, Renco Posinković, Vojko Šegvić, Branimir Bucan, Branislav Zovko, Boris Katić, Nenad Matosic, Zoran Filipović, Mladen Hraste, Tonko Bezina, Teo Novaković, Rino Katunaric, Josko Krekovic, Srdjan Trgo. Coach of that team was Dragan Matutinović and Damir Kotrulja was his vice.

However, in the Croatian league introduced in 1992, the club has never managed to win the national title. The roll of honour sees the supremacy of the Jug and Mladost and also the appearance of another club of Split, POŠK, champion in 1999. No win also with regard to the national cup.

== Honours ==
=== European competitions ===
LEN Cup Winners' Cup

- Winners (1): 1986–87

=== Domestic competitions ===
Yugoslav League

- Winners (5): 1952, 1953, 1955, 1956, 1961
