= Yugoslav Water Polo Championship =

Defunct Yugoslav water polo competition

The Yugoslav Water Polo Championship was the premier league competition for men's water polo clubs in Yugoslavia. Originally established in 1921 in the Kingdom of Yugoslavia, it ran for almost 20 years before being suspended due to the Second World War and the Invasion of Yugoslavia.

In 1945 it was re-established as the top water polo club competition in the communist SFR Yugoslavia. It ran until 1991 and was dissolved following the breakup of Yugoslavia and the outbreak of the Yugoslav Wars.

Jug was the most successful club in the interwar period, winning 14 titles between 1925 and 1940. In the post-war period, Belgrade-based Partizan won 17 titles, followed by Jug with eight, Jadran Split with seven and Mladost with six.

Partizan and Mladost also had success in European competitions, with each winning the LEN Champions League seven times. Jug, KPK Korčula, Mornar and POŠK had also won LEN competitions.

== Title holders ==
- 1921: Polet Sombor
- 1922: Polet Sombor
- 1923: Baluni Split
- 1924: Polet Sombor
- 1925: Jug
- 1926: Jug
- 1927: Jug
- 1928: Jug
- 1929: Jug
- 1930: Jug
- 1931: Jug
- 1932: Jug
- 1933: Jug
- 1934: Jug
- 1935: Jug
- 1936: Jug
- 1937: Jug
- 1938: Viktorija Sušak
- 1939: Jadran Split
- 1940: Jug
- 1941-44: Not held due to WWII
- 1945: PR Croatia
- 1946: Jadran Split
- 1947: Hajduk Split
- 1948: Hajduk Split
- 1949: Jug
- 1950: Jug
- 1951: Jug
- 1952: Mornar
- 1953: Mornar
- 1954: Jadran Split
- 1955: Mornar
- 1956: Mornar
- 1957: Jadran Split
- 1958: Jadran
- 1959: Jadran
- 1960: Jadran Split
- 1961: Mornar
- 1962: Mladost
- 1963: Partizan
- 1964: Partizan
- 1965: Partizan
- 1966: Partizan
- 1967: Mladost
- 1968: Partizan
- 1969: Mladost
- 1970: Partizan
- 1971: Mladost
- 1972: Partizan
- 1973: Partizan
- 1974: Partizan
- 1975: Partizan
- 1976: Partizan
- 1977: Partizan
- 1978: Partizan
- 1979: Partizan
- 1980: Jug
- 1981: Jug
- 1981–82: Jug
- 1982–83: Jug
- 1983–84: Partizan
- 1984–85: Jug
- 1985–86: Primorac Kotor
- 1986–87: Partizan
- 1987–88: Partizan
- 1988–89: Mladost
- 1989–90: Mladost
- 1990–91: Jadran Split

== Titles by club ==
Club	City	Titles	Winning years
Jug	Dubrovnik	22	1925, 1926, 1927, 1928, 1929, 1930, 1931, 1932, 1933, 1934, 1935, 1936, 1937, 1940, 1949, 1950, 1951, 1980, 1981, 1981-82, 1982-83, 1984-85
Partizan	Belgrade	17	1963, 1964, 1965, 1966, 1968, 1970, 1972, 1973, 1974, 1975, 1976, 1977, 1978, 1979, 1983-84, 1986-87, 1987-88
Jadran Split	Split	9	1923, 1939, 1946, 1947, 1948, 1954, 1957, 1960, 1990-91
Mladost	Zagreb	6	1962, 1967, 1969, 1971, 1988-89, 1989-90
Mornar	Split	5	1952, 1953, 1955, 1956, 1961
Polet Sombor	Sombor	3	1921, 1922, 1924
Jadran	Herceg Novi	2	1958, 1959
Primorje	Rijeka	1	1938
PR Croatia	Zagreb	1	1945
Primorac Kotor	Kotor	1	1985-86

== Successor leagues ==
- Bosnia and Herzegovina → Bosnia and Herzegovina Water Polo League
- Croatia → Croatian First League of Water Polo (1992–present)
- Montenegro → Montenegrin First League of Water Polo (2006–present; from 1992–2006 had a joint league with Serbia)
- Serbia → Serbian Water Polo League A (2006–present, from 1992–2006 had a joint league with Montenegro)

== See also ==
- Yugoslavia men's national water polo team
