= Nikola Milošević (water polo) =

Croatian water polo player

Personal information
- Nationality: Croatian
- Born: 7 April 2001 (age 25) Rijeka, Croatia
- Height: 1.97 m (6 ft 6 in)
- Weight: 115 kg (254 lb)

Sport
- Country: Croatia
- Sport: Water polo
- Club: VK Primorje; VK Jadran Kostrena

Nikola Milošević (born April 7, 2001) is a Croatian professional junior water polo player. He is currently playing for VK Primorje at the position of a goalkeeper. He is 6 ft 6 in (1.97 m) tall and weighs 254 lb (115 kg).
