= Croatian Water Polo Federation =

Governing body of water polo in Croatia

The Croatian Water Polo Federation (Croatian: Hrvatski vaterpolski savez, abbr. HVS) is the governing body of water polo in Croatia. Formed on 21 May 1971 in Split, it is based in Zagreb.

Water polo is played in Croatia since as early as 1908. In 2004 Perica Bukić was elected as president of the Federation.

As of 2026, president of the Federation was Mladen Drnasin, executive vice-president Perica Bukić, president of the Advisory board Ratko Rudić, general secretary Ivan Milaković etc.

Federation organizes the Croatian Cup of Water Polo and governs Croatian national teams:

- men's team (World, European and Olympic champions)
- women's team
- junior men's team
- U-18 men's team (2016 and 2026 World champions)
- U-16 men's team (2026 World champions)

== League system ==
Level	Leagues			
1	Regionalna liga (Adriatic water polo league); 7 clubs			
2	1. B liga 13 clubs			
3	2. liga Sjever; 3 clubs		2. liga Jug; 4 clubs	
4	3. liga Slavonija; 5 clubs	3. liga Rijeka; 5 clubs	3. liga Split; 5 clubs	3. liga Šibenik; 4 clubs
