= VK Jadran Split =

Men's professional water polo club in Split, Croatia

- Official logo
- Founded: 23 September 1920; 105 years ago
- League: Croatian League; Champions League
- Based in: Split, Croatia
- Arena: Sports Center Poljud
- President: Albert Pavlović
- Head coach: Mile Smodlaka
- Website: vkjadransplit.hr

Vaterpolski klub Jadran Split (English: Jadran Split Water Polo Club), commonly referred to as Jadran Split or simply Jadran, is a professional water polo club based in Split, Croatia. As of 2025–26 season, the club competes in the Croatian League and Champions League.

== History ==
Jadran was founded in 1920 originally called "Pomorski klub Baluni" which changed to "Jadran Split" almost the year after the winning of the first national championship in 1923. Immediately after the Second World War (1946–60) the club topped the league six times, two of these (1947, 1948) as the water polo section of the famous multi-sports club of Hajduk Split. Thirty years later Jadran returned powerfully to the forefront in 1991 by winning the last league of united Yugoslavia, followed by two consecutive conquests of the European Championship in 1992 and 1993 as a representative value of the newly independent Croatia. The 1997–98 season found Jadran in another one European cup final but this time lost the LEN Trophy from Partizan.

== Honours ==
=== European competitions ===
LEN Champions League

- Winners (2): 1991–92, 1992-93

LEN Trophy

- Runners-up (1): 1997–98

LEN Super Cup

- Runners-up (2): 1992, 1993

COMEN Cup

- Winners (2): 1991, 1995

Regional League

- Runners-up (1): 2021–22

=== Domestic competitions ===
Yugoslav League

- Winners (9): 1923, 1939, 1946, 1947, 1948, 1953, 1957, 1960, 1990–91

Croatian League

- Winners (3): 2022–23, 2023-24, 2024-25

Croatian Cup

- Winners (1): 2021–22

== Current squad ==
Season 2021–22

No.	Nat.	Player	Birth Date	Position	L/R
1	(Croatia)	Ivan Marcelić	November 5, 1994 (age 31)	Goalkeeper	
2	(Croatia)	Rino Burić	April 5, 1997 (age 29)	Guard	
3	(Croatia)	Jerko Marinić Kragić	January 24, 1991 (age 35)	Wing	
4	(Croatia)	Marino Čagalj	January 1, 2002 (age 24)	Guard	R
5	(Croatia)	Zvonimir Butić	January 1, 1987 (age 39)	Wing	L
6	(Croatia)	Duje Pejković	January 1, 1999 (age 27)	Wing	
7	(Croatia)	Luka Bukić	April 20, 1994 (age 32)	Wing	
8	(Croatia)	Konstantin Kharkov	January 1, 1997 (age 29)	Wing	
9	(Croatia)	Marin Delić	June 3, 1996 (age 30)	Wing	
10	(Croatia)	Nikša Dobud	August 5, 1985 (age 40)	Center	R
11	(Croatia)	Anđelo Šetka	September 14, 1985 (age 40)	Wing	R
12	(Croatia)	Toni Radan	January 1, 2001 (age 25)	Wing	R
13	(Croatia)	Mate Anić	April 6, 1994 (age 32)	Goalkeeper	R
14	(Croatia)	Robert Stojanac	January 1, 2005 (age 21)	Wing	R
