= VK Primorje =

Croatian water polo club

VK Bank
- Founded: 1908; 118 years ago
- League: Croatian League
- Based in: Rijeka, Croatia
- Arena: Kantrida (Capacity: 1,200)
- Colors
- President: Samir Barać
- Head coach: Igor Hinić
- Local media: Facebook
- Website: vaterpolo-primorje.hr

VK Bank (Croatian: Vaterpolski klub Primorje Erste Bank, commonly referred to as VK Primorje EB) is a professional water polo club based in Rijeka, Croatia. As of 2025–26 season, the club competes in the Croatian League.

== History ==
The club was founded in 1908, as HŠK Victoria (Croatian Sports Club Victoria), and is the oldest swimming club in Croatia. Under that name, the club was active until World War II. After the war, the club was re-established in 1948 as Primorje. Since 1991 and the breakup of Yugoslavia the club has been competing in Croatian First League, as well as the regional Adriatic League and LEN Champions League.

VK Primorje EB has won three national championships, the first in 1938 (as HŠK Victoria), and the second and third in the 2013/14 and 2014/15 seasons. Primorje has won three Adriatic League titles, in 2012/13, 2013/14 and 2014/15. Primorje has also won five national cup competitions.

The club has produced many players that have had a significant impact for the Croatia men's national water polo team, including Igor Hinić, Damir Glavan, Damir Burić, and Samir Barać, all of whom have won medals at major international competitions. In addition, the club also produced Danijel Premuš and Vladimir Vujasinović, who went on to win olympic medals for Italy and Serbia respectively.

== Venue ==
The club's home games are held at the newly built Bazeni Kantrida, the venue which hosted the 2008 European Short Course Swimming Championships. The capacity of the new swimming complex is approximately 1,200 and is located within walking distance from HNK Rijeka's football stadium.

== Team ==
=== Current squad ===
Season 2019–2020

No.	Nat.	Player	Pos.
1	(Croatia)	Fran Čubranić	GK
13	(Croatia)	Nikola Milošević	GK
19	(Croatia)	Noa Olić	GK
3	(Croatia)	Tin Brubnjak
4	(Croatia)	Iv Marić
5	(Croatia)	Duje Peroš (c)
6	(Croatia)	Marko Blažić
7	(Slovakia)	Maroš Tkač
8	(Croatia)	Dario Rakovac
9	(Croatia)	Sven Augusti
10	(Croatia)	Mislav Vrlić
11	(Croatia)	Ian Petrić
12	(Croatia)	Lovro Paparić
2	(Croatia)	Antonio Čunko
14	(Croatia)	Ian Petrić
15	(Croatia)
16	(Croatia)
17	(Croatia)
18	(Croatia)
19	(Croatia)

=== Technical staff ===
- Head coach: Igor Hinić
- Assistant coach: Ivan Matković, prof

== Honours ==
=== European competitions ===
LEN Champions League

- Runners-up (2): 2011–12, 2014–15
- Third placed (2): 2003–04, 2013–14

LEN Euro Cup

- Runners-up (1): 2023–24

LEN Cup Winners' Cup

- Runners-up (1): 1976–77
- Third placed (2): 1979–80, 1995–96

COMEN Cup

- Winners (1): 1996

Adriatic League

- Winners (3): 2012–13, 2013–14, 2014–15
- Runners-up (2): 2011–12, 2015–16

=== Domestic competitions ===
Croatian League

- Winners (2): 2013–14, 2014–15
- Runners-up (5): 2003–04, 2010–11, 2011–12, 2012–13, 2015–16

Croatian Cup

- Winners (4): 1995–96, 2012–13, 2013–14, 2014–15
- Runners-up (3): 2002–03, 2010–11, 2015–16

Yugoslav League

- Winners (1): 1938
- Runners-up (2): 1978–79, 1982–83

Yugoslav Cup

- Winners (1): 1979
- Runners-up (1): 1976
