= VK Jug =

Professional water polo club based in Dubrovnik, Croatia

Vaterpolski klub Jug
- Founded: 1923; 103 years ago
- League: Croatian League; Euro Cup
- Based in: Dubrovnik, Croatia
- Arena: Bazen u Gružu (Capacity: 2,500)
- Colours: Red and blue
- President: Tomislav Dumančić
- Head coach: Vjekoslav Kobešćak
- Championships: 4 Champions League; 2 Euro Cup; 2 LEN Super Cup; 5 Regional Water Polo League; 17 Croatian Championships; 16 Croatian Cups; 22 Yugoslav Championships; 2 Yugoslav Cups
- Website: jug.hr

Vaterpolski klub Jug (English: Jug Water Polo Club) is a professional water polo club based in Dubrovnik, Croatia. The club was established in 1923 as part of sports society "JUG". As of the 2025–26 season, VK Jug competes in the Croatian League and Euro Cup.

== History ==
=== 1923–1941 ===
Since establishment in 1923, Jug was one of the most successful water polo clubs in Yugoslavia. It won fourteen Yugoslav Water Polo Championship titles in Kingdom of Yugoslavia.

=== 1945–1991 ===
During the existence of SFR Yugoslavia, Jug was among the elite Yugoslav water polo clubs, winning a total of eights Yugoslav Water Polo Championship titles; three in a row from 1949 to 1951, four in a row from 1980 to 1983, and their last one in 1985. Jug also won its first European title, the Champions Cup, in 1981. It also won the National Cup of Yugoslavia in 1981 and 1983.

=== 1991–2008 ===
After the breakup of Yugoslavia in 1991, Jug won six Croatian First League of Water Polo championships and eight Croatian Water Polo Cup titles until the 2007–08 season. It cemented its dominance in Croatia by winning the top-tier continental 2000–01 LEN Champions League and 2005–06 LEN Euroleague titles.

Dubrovnik City Council honoured the club in 1997 with the City of Dubrovnik Award.

=== 2008–present ===
In the 2008–09 season, Jug won the inaugural season of the Regional Water Polo League. From 2009–10 to 2014–15, Jug was five-time runner-up in the competition and finished in third place once. In Croatia, it won five consecutive championship titles from 2008–09 to 2012–13 and Croatian Cup in the 2008–09 season.

In the 2015–16 season, Jug set a record by winning all competitions it played in. After taking the Croatian League championship and Croatian Cup title, Jug won the Regional Water Polo League for the second time in club's history and was crowned the 2015–16 LEN Champions League champion for fourth time in club's history.

Starting the 2016–17 season, Jug won the 2016 LEN Super Cup. Jug defended the Regional Water Polo League title in 2016–17, but was stopped in the final of the 2016–17 LEN Champions League by Hungarian team Szolnoki. In the 2017–18 season, Jug won third Regional League title in a row and lost in third-place game of the 2017–18 LEN Champions League.

In the 2018–19 season, Jug failed to defend the Regional Water Polo League title for fourth season in a row, losing to HAVK Mladost. Also, in the 2018–19 LEN Champions League, it lost in the quarterfinals to Hungarian team Ferencvárosi with 10–9.

== Honours ==
Competition	#	Winning years
National Championships	39	
National Championship of Croatia	17	2000, 2001, 2004, 2005, 2006, 2007, 2009, 2010, 2011, 2012, 2013, 2016, 2017, 2018, 2019, 2020, 2022
National Championship of Communist Yugoslavia	8	1949, 1950, 1951, 1980, 1981, 1982, 1983, 1985
National Championship of the Kingdom of Yugoslavia	14	1925, 1926, 1927, 1928, 1929, 1930, 1931, 1932, 1933, 1934, 1935, 1936, 1937, 1940
National Cups	18	
National Cup of Croatia	16	1994, 1996, 2000, 2002, 2003, 2004, 2006, 2007, 2008, 2009, 2016, 2017, 2018, 2019, 2022, 2023
National Cup of Communist Yugoslavia	2	1981, 1983
Regional Championships	5	
Regional Water Polo League	5	2009, 2016, 2017, 2018, 2023
European Cups	8	
LEN Champions League	4	1981, 2001, 2006, 2016
LEN Super Cup	2	2006, 2016
LEN Cup	2	2000, 2024

== Current squad ==
Season 2021–22

No.	Nat.	Player	Birth Date	Position	L/R
1	(Croatia)	Toni Popadić	5 November 1994 (age 31)	Goalkeeper	
2	(Croatia)	Hrvoje Zvono	31 January 2003 (age 23)	Wing	
3	(Croatia)	Loren Fatović	16 November 1996 (age 29)	Wing	
4	(Croatia)	Luka Stahor	21 April 2002 (age 24)	Center	R
5	(Croatia)	Maro Joković	1 October 1987 (age 38)	Wing	L
6	(Greece)	Alexandros Papanastasiou	12 February 1999 (age 27)	Wing	
7	(Croatia)	Marin Tomasović	26 January 2001 (age 25)	Wing	
8	(Greece)	Stylianos Argyropoulos	2 August 1996 (age 29)	Wing	
9	(Croatia)	Filip Kržić	28 August 2000 (age 25)	Wing	
10	(Greece)	Konstantinos Kakaris	2 July 1999 (age 26)	Center	R
11	(Croatia)	Hrvoje Benić	26 April 1992 (age 34)	Guard	R
12	(Croatia)	Marko Žuvela	22 December 2001 (age 24)	Guard	R
13	(Croatia)	Ivan Jurišić	28 August 2003 (age 22)	Goalkeeper	R
14	(Croatia)	Ivuša Burđelez	11 July 2005 (age 20)	Guard	R

=== Staff ===
Technical Staff
Chairman	(Croatia) Tomislav Dumančić
Vice-chairman	(Croatia) Željan Konsuo
Vice-chairman	(Croatia) Pero Kulaš
Vice-chairman	(Croatia) Lukša Jakobušić
Club director	(Croatia) Ognjen Kržić
Head coach	(Croatia) Vjekoslav Kobešćak
Assistant coach	(Croatia) Đani Pecotić
Assistant coach	(Croatia) Miho Bobić
Goalkeeping coach	(Croatia) Maro Balić

== Recent seasons ==
As of 7 May 2025.

Season	Tier	League	Pos.	Domestic cup	Regional League	European competitions	
1992	1	1. HVL	3rd	not held			
1992–93	1	1. HVL	3rd	Runner-up			
1993–94	1	1. HVL	5th	Runner-up			
1994–95	1	1. HVL	2nd	Champion			
1995–96	1	1. HVL	2nd	Runner-up			
1996–97	1	1. HVL	3rd	Champion		3 LEN Cup	SF
1997–98	1	1. HVL	4th	Quarterfinalist			
1998–99	1	1. HVL	2nd	Quarterfinalist		3 LEN Cup	SF
1999–00	1	1. HVL	1st	Runner-up		3 LEN Cup	C
2000–01	1	1. HVL	1st	Champion		1 Champions League	C
2001–02	1	1. HVL	2nd	Runner-up		1 Champions League	4th
2002–03	1	1. HVL	2nd	Champion		2 Cup Winners' Cup	QF
2003–04	1	1. HVL	1st	Champion		1 Euroleague	PR
2004–05	1	1. HVL	1st	Champion		1 Euroleague	4th
2005–06	1	1. HVL	1st	Runner-up		1 Euroleague	C
2006–07	1	1. HVL	1st	Champion		LEN Super Cup	C
2006–07	1	1. HVL	1st	Champion		1 Euroleague	F
2007–08	1	1. HVL	2nd	Champion		1 Euroleague	F
2008–09	1	1. HVL	1st	Champion	Champion	1 Euroleague	3rd
2009–10	1	1. HVL	1st	Champion	Runner-up	1 Euroleague	4th
2010–11	1	1. HVL	1st	Semifinalist	Runner-up	1 Euroleague	SGR
2011–12	1	1. HVL	1st	Runner-up	Semifinalist	1 Champions League	QF
2012–13	1	1. HVL	1st	Runner-up	Runner-up	1 Champions League	F
2013–14	1	1. HVL	3rd	Runner-up	Runner-up	1 Champions League	PR
2014–15	1	1. HVL	2nd	Semifinalist	Runner-up	1 Champions League	4th
2015–16	1	1. HVL	1st	Champion	Champion	1 Champions League	C
2016–17	1	1. HVL	1st	Champion	Champion	LEN Super Cup	C
2016–17	1	1. HVL	1st	Champion	Champion	1 Champions League	F
2017–18	1	1. HVL	1st	Champion	Champion	1 Champions League	4th
2018–19	1	1. HVL	1st	Champion	Runner-up	1 Champions League	5th
2019–20	1	1. HVL	1st	Runner-up	Runner-up	1 Champions League	—^{1}
2020–21	1	1. HVL	2nd	Runner-up	Runner-up	1 Champions League	5th
2021–22	1	1. HVL	1st	Runner-up	Semifinalist	1 Champions League	8th
2022–23	1	1. HVL	2nd	Champion	Champion	1 Champions League	QF
2023–24	1	1. HVL	1st	Champion	3rd	2 Euro Cup	C
2024–25	1	1. HVL	3rd	Champion	8th	Super Cup	F
2024–25	1	1. HVL	3rd	Champion	8th	1 Champions League	QR
2024–25	1	1. HVL	3rd	Champion	8th	2 Euro Cup	EF

^1 Cancelled due to the COVID-19 pandemic.
