= HAVK Mladost =

Croatian water polo club

- Founded: 1946; 80 years ago
- League: Croatian League; Champions League
- Based in: Zagreb, Croatia
- President: Boris Labar
- Head coach: Zoran Bajić
- Website: havk-mladost.hr

Hrvatski akademski vaterpolo klub Mladost (English: Croatian Academic Water Polo Club Mladost) or simply HAVK Mladost is a professional water polo club based in Zagreb, Croatia. The club was formed in 1946 and it is part of the Mladost sports society. As of the 2025–26 season, it competes in the Croatian League and Champions League.

== Honours ==
=== Domestic competitions ===
- Croatian League

Winners (11): 1991–92, 1992–93, 1993–94, 1994–95, 1995–96, 1996–97, 1998–99, 2001–02, 2002–03, 2007–08, 2020–21

- Croatian Cup

Winners (10): 1992–93, 1993–94, 1997–98, 1998–99, 2001–02, 2005–06, 2010–11, 2011–12, 2019–20, 2020–21

- Yugoslav League (defunct)

Winners (6): 1962, 1967, 1969, 1971, 1988–89, 1989–90

- Yugoslav Cup (defunct)

Winners (1): 1988–89

=== European competitions ===
- LEN Champions League

Winners (7): 1967–68, 1968–69, 1969–70, 1971–72, 1989–90, 1990–91, 1995–96
Runners–up (4): 1970–71, 1992–93, 1996–97, 1999–2000

- LEN Cup Winners' Cup (defunct)

Winners (2): 1975–76, 1998–99
Runners–up (1): 2001–02

- LEN Cup

Winners (1): 2000–01
Runners–up (1): 2013–14

- LEN Super Cup

Winners (3): 1976, 1990, 1996
Runners–up (1): 1991

=== Regional competitions ===
- Regional Water Polo League

Winners (2): 2018–19, 2019–20

- Runners-up (1): 2017-18
- COMEN Cup (defunct)

Winners (2): 1987, 1990

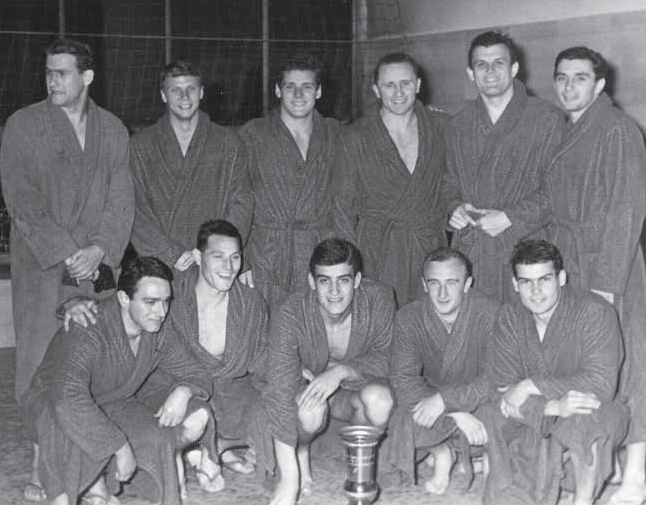
Mladost squad that won the 1961 Yugoslav Winter Championship: Žužej, Legradić, Janković, Ježić, Jeger, Žagar, Fulgozi, Šimenc, Bonačić, Verži, and Stipanić.
