= Croatian Water Polo Cup =

Water polo competition in Croatia

The Croatian Water Polo Cup is a national cup of water polo in Croatia. It is organized by the Croatian Water Polo Federation.

== Title holders ==
- 1992–93 Mladost
- 1993–94 Mladost
- 1994–95 Jug
- 1995–96 Primorje
- 1996–97 Jug
- 1997–98 Mladost
- 1998–99 Mladost
- 1999–00 POŠK
- 2000–01 Jug
- 2001–02 Mladost
- 2002–03 Jug
- 2003–04 Jug
- 2004–05 Jug
- 2005–06 Mladost
- 2006–07 Jug
- 2007–08 Jug
- 2008–09 Jug
- 2009–10 Jug
- 2010–11 Mladost
- 2011–12 Mladost
- 2012–13 Primorje
- 2013–14 Primorje
- 2014–15 Primorje
- 2015–16 Jug
- 2016–17 Jug
- 2017–18 Jug
- 2018–19 Jug
- 2019–20 Mladost
- 2020–21 Mladost
- 2021–22 Jadran
- 2022–23 Jug
- 2023–24 Jug
- 2024-25 Jug
- 2025-26 Mladost

== Results ==
Year	Winner	Runner-up
1992/93	Mladost	Jug
1993/94	Mladost (2)	Jug
1994/95	Jug	Mladost
1995/96	Primorje	Jug
1996/97	Jug (2)	POŠK
1997/98	Mladost (3)	POŠK
1998/99	Mladost (4)	Dubrovnik
1999/00	POŠK	Jug
2000/01	Jug (3)	Mladost
2001/02	Mladost (5)	Jug
2002/03	Jug (4)	Primorje
2003/04	Jug (5)	Jadran
2004/05	Jug (6)	Mladost
2005/06	Mladost (6)	Jug
2006/07	Jug (7)	Mladost
2007/08	Jug (8)	Mladost
2008/09	Jug (9)	Mladost
2009/10	Jug (10)	Mladost
2010/11	Mladost (7)	Primorje
2011/12	Mladost (8)	Jug
2012/13	Primorje (2)	Jug
2013/14	Primorje (3)	Jug
2014/15	Primorje (4)	Mladost
2015/16	Jug (11)	Primorje
2016/17	Jug (12)	Mladost
2017/18	Jug (13)	Mladost
2018/19	Jug (14)	Mladost
2019/20	Mladost (9)	Jug
2020/21	Mladost (10)	Jug
2021/22	Jadran	Jug
2022/23	Jug (15)	Jadran
2023/24	Jug (16)	Jadran
2024/25	Jug (17)	Jadran
2025/26	Mladost	Jadran

=== Results by club ===
Club	Total cups	Cup-winning seasons
Jug	17	1994/95, 1996/97, 2000/01, 2002/03, 2003/04, 2004/05, 2006/07, 2007/08, 2008/09, 2009/10, 2015/16, 2016/17, 2017/18, 2018/19, 2022/23, 2023/24, 2024/25
Mladost	11	1992/93, 1993/94, 1997/98, 1998/99, 2001/02, 2005/06, 2010/11, 2011/12, 2019/20, 2020/21, 2025/26
Primorje	4	1995/96, 2012/13, 2013/14, 2014/15
POŠK	1	1999/00
Jadran	1	2021/22

== See also ==
- Croatian First League of Water Polo
