= Croatian First League of Water Polo =

Water polo league

Croatian First League
- Current season, competition or edition: 2025–26
- Sport: Water polo
- No. of teams: 11
- Confederation: European Aquatics
- Most championships: Jug (17 championships)
- Most recent champion: HAVK Mladost (2025–26)
- Level on pyramid: 1
- Domestic cup: Croatian Cup
- International cup: European Aquatics Champions League European Aquatics Euro Cup
- Website: hvs.hr

The Croatian First League of Water Polo (Croatian: Prva hrvatska vaterpolo liga) is the top water polo league in Croatia.

The league was formed in 1991 with the dissolution of the Yugoslav First League of Water Polo and its first season started in 1992. The league is operated by the Croatian Water Polo Federation.

== Current teams ==
The following 11 clubs compete in the league during the 2025–26 season:

Croatian First League of Water Polo
Team	City	Founded
Jadran	Split	1920
Jug	Dubrovnik	1923
Medveščak	Zagreb	1946
Mladost	Zagreb	1946
Mornar	Split	1949
Solaris	Šibenik	2006
POŠK	Split	1937
Primorje	Rijeka	1908
Zadar 1952	Zadar	1952
OVK Split	Split	2010
KPK	Korčula	1930

== Previous winners ==
Key

†	League champions also won the Croatian Water Polo Cup.

Season	Champions (titles)	Runners-up
1991–92	Mladost †	Jadran
1992–93	Mladost †	Jadran
1993–94	Mladost	Jadran
1994–95	Mladost	Jug
1995–96	Mladost	Jug
1996–97	Mladost †	Jadran
1997–98	POŠK	Mladost
1998–99	Mladost	Jug
1999–00	Jug †	POŠK
2000–01	Jug	Mladost
2001–02	Mladost	Jug
2002–03	Mladost	Jug
2003–04	Jug †	Primorje
2004–05	Jug	Mladost
2005–06	Jug †	Mladost
2006–07	Jug †	Mladost
2007–08	Mladost	Jug
2008–09	Jug †	Mladost
2009–10	Jug	Mladost
2010–11	Jug	Primorje
2011–12	Jug	Primorje
2012–13	Jug	Primorje
2013–14	Primorje †	Mladost
2014–15	Primorje †	Jug
2015–16	Jug †	Primorje
2016–17	Jug †	Mladost
2017–18	Jug †	Mladost
2018–19	Jug †	Mladost
2019–20	Jug	Mladost
2020–21	Mladost †	Jug
2021–22	Jug	Jadran
2022–23	Jadran	Jug
2023–24	Jadran	Jug
2024–25	Jadran	Mladost
2025–26	Mladost †	Jadran

== Performances ==
=== By club ===
Club	Winners	Runners-up	Third place	Winning years
Jug Dubrovnik	17	8	2	2000, 2001, 2004, 2005, 2006, 2007, 2009, 2010, 2011, 2012, 2013, 2016, 2017, 2018, 2019, 2020, 2022
Mladost Zagreb	12	12	3	1992, 1993, 1994, 1995, 1996, 1997, 1999, 2002, 2003, 2008, 2021, 2026
Jadran Split	3	6	4	2023, 2024, 2025
Primorje	2	5	2	2014, 2015
POŠK	1	2	-	1998

All-time Titles

Including titles in SFR Yugoslavia

Club	City	Titles	Winning years
Jug	Dubrovnik	39	1925, 1926, 1927, 1928, 1929, 1930, 1931, 1932, 1933, 1934, 1935, 1936, 1937, 1940, 1949, 1950, 1951, 1980, 1981, 1981-82, 1982-83, 1984-85, 1999-00, 2000-01, 2003-04, 2004-05, 2005-06, 2006-07, 2008-09, 2009-10, 2010-11, 2011-12, 2012-13, 2015-16, 2016-17, 2017-18, 2018-19, 2019-20, 2021-22
Mladost	Zagreb	18	1962, 1967, 1969, 1971, 1988-89, 1989-90, 1991-92, 1992-93, 1993-94, 1994-95, 1995-96, 1996-97, 1998-99, 2001-02, 2002-03, 2007-08, 2020-21, 2025–26
Jadran Split	Split	12	1923, 1939, 1946, 1947, 1948, 1954, 1957, 1960, 1990-91, 2022-23, 2023-24, 2024-25
Mornar	Split	5	1952, 1953, 1955, 1956, 1961
Primorje	Rijeka	3	1938, 2013-14, 2014-15
POŠK	Split	1	1997-98
PR Croatia	Zagreb	1	1945
