= Croatia at the 2022 World Aquatics Championships =

- Flag of Croatia
- World Aquatics code: CRO
- National federation: Croatian Swimming Federation

in Budapest, Hungary
- Competitors: 17 in 4 sports
- Medals: Gold 0 Silver 0 Bronze 0 Total 0

World Aquatics Championships appearances
- 1994; 1998; 2001; 2003; 2005; 2007; 2009; 2011; 2013; 2015; 2017; 2019; 2022; 2023; 2024; 2025

Other related appearances
- Yugoslavia (1973–1991)

Croatia competed at the 2022 World Aquatics Championships in Budapest, Hungary from 18 June to 3 July.

== Artistic swimming ==
Croatia entered 2 artistic swimmers.

Women

Athlete	Event	Preliminaries		Final	
Athlete	Event	Points	Rank	Points	Rank
Klara Šilobodec	Solo technical routine	72.4970	19	did not advance	
Klara Šilobodec	Solo free routine	73.9333	19	did not advance	
Antonija Huljev; Klara Šilobodec	Duet free routine	74.1000	23	did not advance	

== Open water swimming ==
Croatia entered 1 open water swimmer

Men

Athlete	Event	Time	Rank
Grgo Mujan	5 km	1:00:11.7	47

== Swimming ==
Croatia entered 1 swimmer.

Women

Athlete	Event	Heat		Semifinal		Final	
Athlete	Event	Time	Rank	Time	Rank	Time	Rank
Meri Mataja	50 m breaststroke	32.34	34	did not advance			

== Water polo ==
Summary

Team	Event	Group stage				Playoff	Quarterfinal	Semifinal	Final / BM	
Team	Event	Opposition Score	Opposition Score	Opposition Score	Rank	Opposition Score	Opposition Score	Opposition Score	Opposition Score	Rank
Croatia	Men's tournament	Greece; D 8–8	Germany; W 13–9	Japan; W 21–12	2 P/off	Georgia; W 13–7	Serbia; W 14–12	Spain; L 5–10	Greece; L 7–9	4

=== Men's tournament ===
Team roster

The following is Croatian roster in the Water polo at the 2022 World Aquatics Championships – Men's tournament.

Head coach: Ivica Tucak

- 1 Marko Bijač GK
- 2 Rino Burić FP
- 3 Loren Fatović FP
- 4 Ivan Krapić FP
- 5 Franko Lazić FP
- 6 Luka Bukić FP
- 7 Ante Vukičević FP
- 8 Marko Žuvela FP
- 9 Jerko Marinić Kragić FP
- 10 Josip Vrlić FP
- 11 Andrija Bašić FP
- 12 Konstantin Kharkov FP
- 13 Toni Popadić GK

Group play

Pos	Team	Pld	W	D	L	GF	GA	GD	Pts	Qualification
1	Greece	3	2	1	0	42	23	+19	5 (Note: Greece 8–8 Croatia)	Quarterfinals
2	Croatia	3	2	1	0	42	30	+12	5	Playoffs
3	Japan	3	1	0	2	32	50	−18	2	Playoffs
4	Germany	3	0	0	3	28	41	−13	0	

Source: Sportresult
Rules for classification: 1) points; 2) head-to-head points; 3) head-to-head goal difference; 4) head-to-head number of goals scored; 5) Goal difference.
Notes:

21 June 2022; 19:30	Report	Greece	8–8	Croatia	Debrecen Swimming Pool Complex, Debrecen; Referees: Boris Margeta (SLO), David Gómez (ESP)
21 June 2022; 19:30	Report	Score by quarters: 4–1, 1–4, 2–1, 1–2			Debrecen Swimming Pool Complex, Debrecen; Referees: Boris Margeta (SLO), David Gómez (ESP)
21 June 2022; 19:30	Report	Vlachopoulos 4	Goals	Kharkov 3	Debrecen Swimming Pool Complex, Debrecen; Referees: Boris Margeta (SLO), David Gómez (ESP)

23 June 2022; 18:00	Report	Croatia	13–9	Germany	Debrecen Swimming Pool Complex, Debrecen; Referees: Michiel Zwart (NED), Ivan Raković (SRB)
23 June 2022; 18:00	Report	Score by quarters: 4–1, 4–1, 2–2, 3–5			Debrecen Swimming Pool Complex, Debrecen; Referees: Michiel Zwart (NED), Ivan Raković (SRB)
23 June 2022; 18:00	Report	Bašić, Krapić 3	Goals	Küppers 3	Debrecen Swimming Pool Complex, Debrecen; Referees: Michiel Zwart (NED), Ivan Raković (SRB)

25 June 2022; 18:00	Report	Japan	13–21	Croatia	Debrecen Swimming Pool Complex, Debrecen; Referees: Michael Goldenberg (USA), David Gómez (ESP)
25 June 2022; 18:00	Report	Score by quarters: 3–4, 6–3, 2–7, 2–7			Debrecen Swimming Pool Complex, Debrecen; Referees: Michael Goldenberg (USA), David Gómez (ESP)
25 June 2022; 18:00	Report	Inaba 5	Goals	Kharkov, Krapić 5	Debrecen Swimming Pool Complex, Debrecen; Referees: Michael Goldenberg (USA), David Gómez (ESP)

Playoffs

27 June 2022; 15:30	Report	Georgia	7–13	Croatia	Alfréd Hajós National Swimming Stadium, Budapest; Referees: Boris Margeta (SLO), György Kun (HUN)
27 June 2022; 15:30	Report	Score by quarters: 2–3, 2–4, 0–3, 3–3			Alfréd Hajós National Swimming Stadium, Budapest; Referees: Boris Margeta (SLO), György Kun (HUN)
27 June 2022; 15:30	Report	Vapenski, Vasić 2	Goals	Kharkov 4	Alfréd Hajós National Swimming Stadium, Budapest; Referees: Boris Margeta (SLO), György Kun (HUN)

Quarterfinals

29 June 2022; 16:00	Report	Serbia	12–14	Croatia	Alfréd Hajós National Swimming Stadium, Budapest; Referees: Georgios Stavridis (GRE), György Kun (HUN)
29 June 2022; 16:00	Report	Score by quarters: 1–1, 3–4, 5–5, 3–4			Alfréd Hajós National Swimming Stadium, Budapest; Referees: Georgios Stavridis (GRE), György Kun (HUN)
29 June 2022; 16:00	Report	Mandić 4	Goals	four players 2	Alfréd Hajós National Swimming Stadium, Budapest; Referees: Georgios Stavridis (GRE), György Kun (HUN)

Semifinals

1 July 2022; 19:30	Report	Spain	10–5	Croatia	Alfréd Hajós National Swimming Stadium, Budapest; Referees: Boris Margeta (SLO), Frank Ohme (GER)
1 July 2022; 19:30	Report	Score by quarters: 3–3, 4–2, 0–0, 3–0			Alfréd Hajós National Swimming Stadium, Budapest; Referees: Boris Margeta (SLO), Frank Ohme (GER)
1 July 2022; 19:30	Report	Granados 4	Goals	Bukić 2	Alfréd Hajós National Swimming Stadium, Budapest; Referees: Boris Margeta (SLO), Frank Ohme (GER)

Third place game

3 July 2022; 14:30	Report	Greece	9–7	Croatia	Alfréd Hajós National Swimming Stadium, Budapest; Referees: Frank Ohme (GER), Michiel Zwart (NED)
3 July 2022; 14:30	Report	Score by quarters: 1–0, 4–3, 3–2, 1–2			Alfréd Hajós National Swimming Stadium, Budapest; Referees: Frank Ohme (GER), Michiel Zwart (NED)
3 July 2022; 14:30	Report	Kakaris 3	Goals	Bukić 2	Alfréd Hajós National Swimming Stadium, Budapest; Referees: Frank Ohme (GER), Michiel Zwart (NED)
