= Water polo at the 2022 World Aquatics Championships – Men's tournament =

Tournament details
- Venue: Hungary (in Budapest, Szeged, Debrecen, Sopron host cities)
- Dates: 21 June – 3 July
- Teams: 16 (from 5 confederations)

Final positions
- Champions: Spain (3rd title)
- Runners-up: Italy
- Third place: Greece
- Fourth place: Croatia

Tournament statistics
- Matches played: 43
- Goals scored: 962 (22.37 per match)
- Top scorers: (United States) Alex Bowen (21 goals)

The men's water polo tournament at the 2022 World Aquatics Championships was held from 21 June to 3 July 2022 in Budapest, Hungary. This was the 19th time that the men's water polo tournament has been played since the first edition in 1973.

Spain won their third title with a win over Italy, while Greece beat Croatia to win the bronze medal.

== Qualification ==
Event	Dates	Hosts	Quota	Qualifier(s)
Host nation	—N/a		1	Hungary
2020 FINA World League	26 June – 1 July 2020	(Georgia (country)) Tbilisi	2	Montenegro; United States
2020 Summer Olympics	25 July – 8 August 2020	(Japan) Tokyo	4	Serbia; Greece; Spain; Croatia
2020 Men's European Water Polo Championship	14–26 January 2020	(Hungary) Budapest	2	Italy; ~~Russia~~; Germany
2022 Intercontinental Cup (Americas qualifier)	7–13 March 2022	(Peru) Lima	2	Canada; Brazil
Asian selection	—N/a		2	Kazakhstan; Japan
African selection	—N/a		1	South Africa
Oceanian selection	—N/a		1	Australia
Wild card	—N/a		1	Georgia
Total			16	

Russia was excluded due to the 2022 Russian invasion of Ukraine.

== Draw ==
The draw was held on 12 April 2022.

=== Seeding ===
The pots were determined as follow.

- Pot 1: the 4 semifinalists of the 2020 Summer Olympics
- Pot 2: the 2 finalists of the World League, Europe Qualifier 1 and America Qualifier 1
- Pot 3: Europe Qualifier 2, Europe Qualifier 3, Oceania Qualifier 1, America Qualifier 2
- Pot 4: Africa Qualifier 1, Asia Qualifier 1, Asia Qualifier 2, Europe Qualifier 4.

Pot 1	Pot 2	Pot 3	Pot 4
Serbia; Greece; Hungary; Spain	Montenegro; United States; Croatia; Canada	Brazil; Italy; Germany; Australia	South Africa; Kazakhstan; Japan; Georgia

The draw resulted in the following groups:

Group A	Group B	Group C	Group D
Hungary	Greece	Spain	Serbia
Montenegro	Croatia	Canada	United States
Brazil	Germany	Italy	Australia
Georgia	Japan	South Africa	Kazakhstan

== Preliminary round ==
=== Group A ===
Pos	Team	Pld	W	D	L	GF	GA	GD	Pts	Qualification
1	Hungary (H)	3	3	0	0	50	28	+22	6	Quarterfinals
2	Montenegro	3	2	0	1	38	26	+12	4	Playoffs
3	Georgia	3	1	0	2	37	38	−1	2	Playoffs
4	Brazil	3	0	0	3	21	54	−33	0	

Source: Sportresult
Rules for classification: 1) points; 2) head-to-head points; 3) head-to-head goal difference; 4) head-to-head number of goals scored; 5) Goal difference.
(H) Hosts

21 June 2022; 19:30	Report	Brazil	10–14	Georgia	Alfréd Hajós National Swimming Stadium, Budapest; Referees: Maro Savinović (CRO), Dion Willis (RSA)
21 June 2022; 19:30	Report	Score by quarters: 2–2, 3–3, 3–6, 2–3			Alfréd Hajós National Swimming Stadium, Budapest; Referees: Maro Savinović (CRO), Dion Willis (RSA)
21 June 2022; 19:30	Report	Freitas 4	Goals	Sarić, Vapenski 4	Alfréd Hajós National Swimming Stadium, Budapest; Referees: Maro Savinović (CRO), Dion Willis (RSA)

21 June 2022; 21:00	Report	Montenegro	8–12	Hungary	Alfréd Hajós National Swimming Stadium, Budapest; Referees: Michael Goldenberg (USA), Frank Ohme (GER)
21 June 2022; 21:00	Report	Score by quarters: 3–3, 1–3, 2–3, 2–3			Alfréd Hajós National Swimming Stadium, Budapest; Referees: Michael Goldenberg (USA), Frank Ohme (GER)
21 June 2022; 21:00	Report	Petković 4	Goals	Zalánki 4	Alfréd Hajós National Swimming Stadium, Budapest; Referees: Michael Goldenberg (USA), Frank Ohme (GER)

23 June 2022; 19:30	Report	Georgia	9–10	Montenegro	Alfréd Hajós National Swimming Stadium, Budapest; Referees: Pascal Bouchez (FRA), Maro Savinović (CRO)
23 June 2022; 19:30	Report	Score by quarters: 1–4, 3–0, 3–4, 2–2			Alfréd Hajós National Swimming Stadium, Budapest; Referees: Pascal Bouchez (FRA), Maro Savinović (CRO)
23 June 2022; 19:30	Report	Vasić 5	Goals	Đurđić 4	Alfréd Hajós National Swimming Stadium, Budapest; Referees: Pascal Bouchez (FRA), Maro Savinović (CRO)

23 June 2022; 21:00	Report	Hungary	20–6	Brazil	Alfréd Hajós National Swimming Stadium, Budapest; Referees: Andrew Carney (AUS), Frank Ohme (GER)
23 June 2022; 21:00	Report	Score by quarters: 7–1, 4–2, 3–1, 6–2			Alfréd Hajós National Swimming Stadium, Budapest; Referees: Andrew Carney (AUS), Frank Ohme (GER)
23 June 2022; 21:00	Report	three players 3	Goals	Real 2	Alfréd Hajós National Swimming Stadium, Budapest; Referees: Andrew Carney (AUS), Frank Ohme (GER)

25 June 2022; 19:30	Report	Brazil	5–20	Montenegro	Alfréd Hajós National Swimming Stadium, Budapest; Referees: Andrew Carney (AUS), Frank Ohme (GER)
25 June 2022; 19:30	Report	Score by quarters: 0–4, 2–6, 0–7, 3–3			Alfréd Hajós National Swimming Stadium, Budapest; Referees: Andrew Carney (AUS), Frank Ohme (GER)
25 June 2022; 19:30	Report	five players 1	Goals	three players 3	Alfréd Hajós National Swimming Stadium, Budapest; Referees: Andrew Carney (AUS), Frank Ohme (GER)

25 June 2022; 21:00	Report	Hungary	18–14	Georgia	Alfréd Hajós National Swimming Stadium, Budapest; Referees: Dion Willis (RSA), Pascal Bouchez (FRA)
25 June 2022; 21:00	Report	Score by quarters: 3–3, 7–3, 4–5, 4–3			Alfréd Hajós National Swimming Stadium, Budapest; Referees: Dion Willis (RSA), Pascal Bouchez (FRA)
25 June 2022; 21:00	Report	Manhercz, Zalánki 4	Goals	Shushiashvili, Vapenski 3	Alfréd Hajós National Swimming Stadium, Budapest; Referees: Dion Willis (RSA), Pascal Bouchez (FRA)

=== Group B ===
Pos	Team	Pld	W	D	L	GF	GA	GD	Pts	Qualification
1	Greece	3	2	1	0	42	23	+19	5 (Note: Greece 8–8 Croatia)	Quarterfinals
2	Croatia	3	2	1	0	42	30	+12	5	Playoffs
3	Japan	3	1	0	2	32	50	−18	2	Playoffs
4	Germany	3	0	0	3	28	41	−13	0	

Source: Sportresult
Rules for classification: 1) points; 2) head-to-head points; 3) head-to-head goal difference; 4) head-to-head number of goals scored; 5) Goal difference.
Notes:

21 June 2022; 18:00	Report	Germany	11–12	Japan	Debrecen Swimming Pool Complex, Debrecen; Referees: Ivan Raković (SRB), Adil Aimbetov (KAZ)
21 June 2022; 18:00	Report	Score by quarters: 2–5, 2–3, 2–3, 5–1			Debrecen Swimming Pool Complex, Debrecen; Referees: Ivan Raković (SRB), Adil Aimbetov (KAZ)
21 June 2022; 18:00	Report	Schütze 3	Goals	Inaba 5	Debrecen Swimming Pool Complex, Debrecen; Referees: Ivan Raković (SRB), Adil Aimbetov (KAZ)

21 June 2022; 19:30	Report	Greece	8–8	Croatia	Debrecen Swimming Pool Complex, Debrecen; Referees: Boris Margeta (SLO), David Gómez (ESP)
21 June 2022; 19:30	Report	Score by quarters: 4–1, 1–4, 2–1, 1–2			Debrecen Swimming Pool Complex, Debrecen; Referees: Boris Margeta (SLO), David Gómez (ESP)
21 June 2022; 19:30	Report	Vlachopoulos 4	Goals	Kharkov 3	Debrecen Swimming Pool Complex, Debrecen; Referees: Boris Margeta (SLO), David Gómez (ESP)

23 June 2022; 18:00	Report	Croatia	13–9	Germany	Debrecen Swimming Pool Complex, Debrecen; Referees: Michiel Zwart (NED), Ivan Raković (SRB)
23 June 2022; 18:00	Report	Score by quarters: 4–1, 4–1, 2–2, 3–5			Debrecen Swimming Pool Complex, Debrecen; Referees: Michiel Zwart (NED), Ivan Raković (SRB)
23 June 2022; 18:00	Report	Bašić, Krapić 3	Goals	Küppers 3	Debrecen Swimming Pool Complex, Debrecen; Referees: Michiel Zwart (NED), Ivan Raković (SRB)

23 June 2022; 19:30	Report	Japan	7–18	Greece	Debrecen Swimming Pool Complex, Debrecen; Referees: Adil Aimbetov (KAZ), Michael Goldenberg (USA)
23 June 2022; 19:30	Report	Score by quarters: 1–3, 2–4, 2–5, 2–6			Debrecen Swimming Pool Complex, Debrecen; Referees: Adil Aimbetov (KAZ), Michael Goldenberg (USA)
23 June 2022; 19:30	Report	three players 2	Goals	Argyropoulos 6	Debrecen Swimming Pool Complex, Debrecen; Referees: Adil Aimbetov (KAZ), Michael Goldenberg (USA)

25 June 2022; 18:00	Report	Japan	13–21	Croatia	Debrecen Swimming Pool Complex, Debrecen; Referees: Michael Goldenberg (USA), David Gómez (ESP)
25 June 2022; 18:00	Report	Score by quarters: 3–4, 6–3, 2–7, 2–7			Debrecen Swimming Pool Complex, Debrecen; Referees: Michael Goldenberg (USA), David Gómez (ESP)
25 June 2022; 18:00	Report	Inaba 5	Goals	Kharkov, Krapić 5	Debrecen Swimming Pool Complex, Debrecen; Referees: Michael Goldenberg (USA), David Gómez (ESP)

25 June 2022; 19:30	Report	Greece	16–8	Germany	Debrecen Swimming Pool Complex, Debrecen; Referees: Harvey Hinds (CUR), Ivan Raković (SRB)
25 June 2022; 19:30	Report	Score by quarters: 4–1, 5–1, 4–2, 3–4			Debrecen Swimming Pool Complex, Debrecen; Referees: Harvey Hinds (CUR), Ivan Raković (SRB)
25 June 2022; 19:30	Report	Genidounias 5	Goals	Božić 2	Debrecen Swimming Pool Complex, Debrecen; Referees: Harvey Hinds (CUR), Ivan Raković (SRB)

=== Group C ===
Pos	Team	Pld	W	D	L	GF	GA	GD	Pts	Qualification
1	Spain	2	2	0	0	42	14	+28	4	Quarterfinals
2	Italy	2	1	0	1	34	18	+16	2	Playoffs
3	South Africa	2	0	0	2	6	50	−44	0	Playoffs
4	Canada (Note: On 24 June, the Canadian team withdrew from the tournament after multiple positive COVID-19 cases amongst the team.)	0	0	0	0	0	0	0	0	Withdrew

Source: Sportresult
Rules for classification: 1) points; 2) head-to-head points; 3) head-to-head goal difference; 4) head-to-head number of goals scored; 5) Goal difference.
Notes:

21 June 2022; 18:00	Report	South Africa	4–22	Italy	Sopron Lőver Pool, Sopron; Referees: Radu Matache (ROU), Wallop Jirathornwattana (THA)
21 June 2022; 18:00	Report	Score by quarters: 1–3, 1–1, 0–7, 2–11			Sopron Lőver Pool, Sopron; Referees: Radu Matache (ROU), Wallop Jirathornwattana (THA)
21 June 2022; 18:00	Report	four players 1	Goals	Fondelli 4	Sopron Lőver Pool, Sopron; Referees: Radu Matache (ROU), Wallop Jirathornwattana (THA)

23 June 2022; 18:00	Report	Spain	28–2	South Africa	Sopron Lőver Pool, Sopron; Referees: Wallop Jirathornwattana (THA), Agustin Pinski (ARG)
23 June 2022; 18:00	Report	Score by quarters: 7–1, 7–0, 6–1, 8–0			Sopron Lőver Pool, Sopron; Referees: Wallop Jirathornwattana (THA), Agustin Pinski (ARG)
23 June 2022; 18:00	Report	Granados 6	Goals	Cronje, Howard 1	Sopron Lőver Pool, Sopron; Referees: Wallop Jirathornwattana (THA), Agustin Pinski (ARG)

25 June 2022; 18:00	Report	Italy	12–14	Spain	Sopron Lőver Pool, Sopron; Referees: Boris Margeta (SLO), Michiel Zwart (NED)
25 June 2022; 18:00	Report	Score by quarters: 4–5, 6–3, 2–2, 0–4			Sopron Lőver Pool, Sopron; Referees: Boris Margeta (SLO), Michiel Zwart (NED)
25 June 2022; 18:00	Report	Di Somma 3	Goals	Granados 3	Sopron Lőver Pool, Sopron; Referees: Boris Margeta (SLO), Michiel Zwart (NED)

21 June 2022 (Annulled) (Note: The Canadian national team later withdrew, so the result of the match was canceled and annulled afterward.); 19:30	Report	Canada	2–19	Spain	Sopron Lover Pool, Sopron; Referees: György Kun (HUN), Agustin Pinski (ARG)
21 June 2022 (Annulled); 19:30	Report	Score by quarters: 0–2, 2–7, 0–6, 0–4			Sopron Lover Pool, Sopron; Referees: György Kun (HUN), Agustin Pinski (ARG)
21 June 2022 (Annulled); 19:30	Report	Constantin-Bicari, D'Souza 1	Goals	Perrone 5	Sopron Lover Pool, Sopron; Referees: György Kun (HUN), Agustin Pinski (ARG)

Cancelled (Note: The match, originally scheduled for 23 June 2022, was postponed due to health concerns.)	Italy	–	Canada

Cancelled	Canada	–	South Africa

=== Group D ===
Pos	Team	Pld	W	D	L	GF	GA	GD	Pts	Qualification
1	Serbia	3	3	0	0	45	21	+24	6	Quarterfinals
2	United States	3	2	0	1	44	30	+14	4	Playoffs
3	Australia	3	1	0	2	24	24	0	2	Playoffs
4	Kazakhstan	3	0	0	3	11	49	−38	0	

Source: Sportresult
Rules for classification: 1) points; 2) head-to-head points; 3) head-to-head goal difference; 4) head-to-head number of goals scored; 5) Goal difference.

21 June 2022; 18:00	Report	Australia	10–4	Kazakhstan	Szeged Tiszavirág Pool, Szeged; Referees: Levan Berishvili (GEO), Veselin Mišković (MNE)
21 June 2022; 18:00	Report	Score by quarters: 1–0, 3–0, 3–2, 3–2			Szeged Tiszavirág Pool, Szeged; Referees: Levan Berishvili (GEO), Veselin Mišković (MNE)
21 June 2022; 18:00	Report	Pavillard, Power 3	Goals	Shmider 3	Szeged Tiszavirág Pool, Szeged; Referees: Levan Berishvili (GEO), Veselin Mišković (MNE)

21 June 2022; 19:30	Report	United States	13–17	Serbia	Szeged Tiszavirág Pool, Szeged; Referees: Georgios Stavridis (GRE), Raffaele Colombo (ITA)
21 June 2022; 19:30	Report	Score by quarters: 5–5, 2–3, 3–3, 3–6			Szeged Tiszavirág Pool, Szeged; Referees: Georgios Stavridis (GRE), Raffaele Colombo (ITA)
21 June 2022; 19:30	Report	Bowen 4	Goals	Mandić 4	Szeged Tiszavirág Pool, Szeged; Referees: Georgios Stavridis (GRE), Raffaele Colombo (ITA)

23 June 2022; 18:00	Report	Serbia	6–5	Australia	Szeged Tiszavirág Pool, Szeged; Referees: Raffaele Colombo (ITA), David Gómez (ESP)
23 June 2022; 18:00	Report	Score by quarters: 1–1, 2–2, 2–2, 1–0			Szeged Tiszavirág Pool, Szeged; Referees: Raffaele Colombo (ITA), David Gómez (ESP)
23 June 2022; 18:00	Report	Lukić, Mandić 2	Goals	Edwards, Power 2	Szeged Tiszavirág Pool, Szeged; Referees: Raffaele Colombo (ITA), David Gómez (ESP)

23 June 2022; 19:30	Report	Kazakhstan	4–17	United States	Szeged Tiszavirág Pool, Szeged; Referees: Levan Berishvili (GEO), Veselin Mišković (MNE)
23 June 2022; 19:30	Report	Score by quarters: 1–7, 2–3, 1–2, 0–5			Szeged Tiszavirág Pool, Szeged; Referees: Levan Berishvili (GEO), Veselin Mišković (MNE)
23 June 2022; 19:30	Report	Shakenov 2	Goals	Irving 4	Szeged Tiszavirág Pool, Szeged; Referees: Levan Berishvili (GEO), Veselin Mišković (MNE)

25 June 2022; 18:00	Report	Kazakhstan	3–22	Serbia	Szeged Tiszavirág Pool, Szeged; Referees: Raffaele Colombo (ITA), Fabio Toffoli (BRA)
25 June 2022; 18:00	Report	Score by quarters: 0–4, 1–8, 0–5, 2–5			Szeged Tiszavirág Pool, Szeged; Referees: Raffaele Colombo (ITA), Fabio Toffoli (BRA)
25 June 2022; 18:00	Report	Vuksanović 3	Goals	S. Rašović 6	Szeged Tiszavirág Pool, Szeged; Referees: Raffaele Colombo (ITA), Fabio Toffoli (BRA)

25 June 2022; 19:30	Report	United States	14–9	Australia	Szeged Tiszavirág Pool, Szeged; Referees: Levan Berishvili (GEO), Veselin Mišković (MNE)
25 June 2022; 19:30	Report	Score by quarters: 4–2, 4–2, 4–3, 2–2			Szeged Tiszavirág Pool, Szeged; Referees: Levan Berishvili (GEO), Veselin Mišković (MNE)
25 June 2022; 19:30	Report	Irving 4	Goals	three players 2	Szeged Tiszavirág Pool, Szeged; Referees: Levan Berishvili (GEO), Veselin Mišković (MNE)

== Knockout stage ==
=== Bracket ===
Championship bracket

Playoffs
27 June
Italy	17
Australia	6
27 June
South Africa	2
United States	24
27 June
Montenegro	10
Japan	9
27 June
Georgia	7
Croatia	13

Quarter-finals
29 June
Hungary	10
Italy	11
29 June
Greece	16
United States	11
29 June
Spain	7
Montenegro	6
29 June
Serbia	12
Croatia	14

Semi-finals
1 July
Italy	11
Greece	10
1 July
Spain	10
Croatia	5

Final
3 July
Italy	9 (5)
Spain (PSO)	9 (6)
Third place
3 July
Greece	9
Croatia	7

5th place bracket

5th–8th place semifinals
1 July
Hungary	11 (4)
United States (PSO)	11 (5)
1 July
Montenegro	7
Serbia	10

Fifth place game
3 July
United States	10
Serbia	13
Seventh place game
3 July
Hungary	8
Montenegro	6

9th place bracket

9th–12th place semifinals
29 June
Japan	15
Australia	7
29 June
Georgia	20
South Africa	7

Ninth place game
1 July
Japan	16
Georgia	15
Eleventh place game
1 July
Australia	19
South Africa	4

13th place bracket

13th–15th place semifinals
27 June
Brazil	9
Germany	10

13th place game
29 June
Germany	16
Kazakhstan	7

=== Playoffs ===
27 June 2022; 14:00	Report	Montenegro	10–9	Japan	Alfréd Hajós National Swimming Stadium, Budapest; Referees: Michael Goldenberg (USA), Michiel Zwart (NED)
27 June 2022; 14:00	Report	Score by quarters: 3–1, 2–5, 3–2, 2–1			Alfréd Hajós National Swimming Stadium, Budapest; Referees: Michael Goldenberg (USA), Michiel Zwart (NED)
27 June 2022; 14:00	Report	Perković 3	Goals	Takata 2	Alfréd Hajós National Swimming Stadium, Budapest; Referees: Michael Goldenberg (USA), Michiel Zwart (NED)

27 June 2022; 15:30	Report	Georgia	7–13	Croatia	Alfréd Hajós National Swimming Stadium, Budapest; Referees: Boris Margeta (SLO), György Kun (HUN)
27 June 2022; 15:30	Report	Score by quarters: 2–3, 2–4, 0–3, 3–3			Alfréd Hajós National Swimming Stadium, Budapest; Referees: Boris Margeta (SLO), György Kun (HUN)
27 June 2022; 15:30	Report	Vapenski, Vasić 2	Goals	Kharkov 4	Alfréd Hajós National Swimming Stadium, Budapest; Referees: Boris Margeta (SLO), György Kun (HUN)

27 June 2022; 17:00	Report	Italy	17–6	Australia	Alfréd Hajós National Swimming Stadium, Budapest; Referees: Frank Ohme (GER), Georgios Stavridis (GRE)
27 June 2022; 17:00	Report	Score by quarters: 4–0, 3–3, 4–1, 6–2			Alfréd Hajós National Swimming Stadium, Budapest; Referees: Frank Ohme (GER), Georgios Stavridis (GRE)
27 June 2022; 17:00	Report	Cannella, Del Lungo 3	Goals	Edwards 3	Alfréd Hajós National Swimming Stadium, Budapest; Referees: Frank Ohme (GER), Georgios Stavridis (GRE)

27 June 2022; 18:30	Report	South Africa	2–24	United States	Alfréd Hajós National Swimming Stadium, Budapest; Referees: Adil Aimbetov (KAZ), Andrew Carney (AUS)
27 June 2022; 18:30	Report	Score by quarters: 0–6, 0–6, 0–5, 2–7			Alfréd Hajós National Swimming Stadium, Budapest; Referees: Adil Aimbetov (KAZ), Andrew Carney (AUS)
27 June 2022; 18:30	Report	Stone, Swanepoel 1	Goals	Dodd 6	Alfréd Hajós National Swimming Stadium, Budapest; Referees: Adil Aimbetov (KAZ), Andrew Carney (AUS)

=== Quarterfinals ===
29 June 2022; 13:00	Report	Greece	16–11	United States	Alfréd Hajós National Swimming Stadium, Budapest; Referees: Michiel Zwart (NED), Frank Ohme (GER)
29 June 2022; 13:00	Report	Score by quarters: 3–1, 4–6, 3–0, 6–4			Alfréd Hajós National Swimming Stadium, Budapest; Referees: Michiel Zwart (NED), Frank Ohme (GER)
29 June 2022; 13:00	Report	Argyropoulos 5	Goals	three players 3	Alfréd Hajós National Swimming Stadium, Budapest; Referees: Michiel Zwart (NED), Frank Ohme (GER)

29 June 2022; 16:00	Report	Serbia	12–14	Croatia	Alfréd Hajós National Swimming Stadium, Budapest; Referees: Georgios Stavridis (GRE), György Kun (HUN)
29 June 2022; 16:00	Report	Score by quarters: 1–1, 3–4, 5–5, 3–4			Alfréd Hajós National Swimming Stadium, Budapest; Referees: Georgios Stavridis (GRE), György Kun (HUN)
29 June 2022; 16:00	Report	Mandić 4	Goals	four players 2	Alfréd Hajós National Swimming Stadium, Budapest; Referees: Georgios Stavridis (GRE), György Kun (HUN)

29 June 2022; 19:30	Report	Spain	7–6	Montenegro	Alfréd Hajós National Swimming Stadium, Budapest; Referees: Michael Goldenberg (USA), Raffaele Colombo (ITA)
29 June 2022; 19:30	Report	Score by quarters: 2–1, 3–2, 1–2, 1–1			Alfréd Hajós National Swimming Stadium, Budapest; Referees: Michael Goldenberg (USA), Raffaele Colombo (ITA)
29 June 2022; 19:30	Report	Mallarach 2	Goals	Đurđić 2	Alfréd Hajós National Swimming Stadium, Budapest; Referees: Michael Goldenberg (USA), Raffaele Colombo (ITA)

29 June 2022; 21:00	Report	Hungary	10–11	Italy	Alfréd Hajós National Swimming Stadium, Budapest; Referees: Boris Margeta (SLO), David Gómez (ESP)
29 June 2022; 21:00	Report	Score by quarters: 3–2, 2–4, 1–2, 4–3			Alfréd Hajós National Swimming Stadium, Budapest; Referees: Boris Margeta (SLO), David Gómez (ESP)
29 June 2022; 21:00	Report	Vámos 3	Goals	Di Fulvio 4	Alfréd Hajós National Swimming Stadium, Budapest; Referees: Boris Margeta (SLO), David Gómez (ESP)

=== 13–15th place semifinals ===
27 June 2022; 17:00	Report	Brazil	9–10	Germany	Szeged Tiszavirág Pool, Szeged; Referees: Radu Matache (ROU), Levan Bertishvili (GEO)
27 June 2022; 17:00	Report	Score by quarters: 2–2, 3–2, 3–3, 1–3			Szeged Tiszavirág Pool, Szeged; Referees: Radu Matache (ROU), Levan Bertishvili (GEO)
27 June 2022; 17:00	Report	Coutinho 3	Goals	Küppers, Strelezkij 3	Szeged Tiszavirág Pool, Szeged; Referees: Radu Matache (ROU), Levan Bertishvili (GEO)

=== 9–12th place semifinals ===
29 June 2022; 17:00	Report	Japan	15–7	Australia	Szeged Tiszavirág Pool, Szeged; Referees: Ivan Raković (SRB), Veselin Mišković (MNE)
29 June 2022; 17:00	Report	Score by quarters: 2–2, 5–2, 5–2, 3–1			Szeged Tiszavirág Pool, Szeged; Referees: Ivan Raković (SRB), Veselin Mišković (MNE)
29 June 2022; 17:00	Report	Date 4	Goals	seven players 1	Szeged Tiszavirág Pool, Szeged; Referees: Ivan Raković (SRB), Veselin Mišković (MNE)

29 June 2022; 18:30	Report	Georgia	20–7	South Africa	Szeged Tiszavirág Pool, Szeged; Referees: Radu Matache (ROU), Anbar Anbar (KUW)
29 June 2022; 18:30	Report	Score by quarters: 3–1, 5–1, 7–2, 5–3			Szeged Tiszavirág Pool, Szeged; Referees: Radu Matache (ROU), Anbar Anbar (KUW)
29 June 2022; 18:30	Report	three players 3	Goals	Olver 2	Szeged Tiszavirág Pool, Szeged; Referees: Radu Matache (ROU), Anbar Anbar (KUW)

=== 5–8th place semifinals ===
1 July 2022; 14:30	Report	Montenegro	7–10	Serbia	Alfréd Hajós National Swimming Stadium, Budapest; Referees: Georgios Stavridis (GRE), David Gómez (ESP)
1 July 2022; 14:30	Report	Score by quarters: 2–2, 2–3, 2–3, 1–2			Alfréd Hajós National Swimming Stadium, Budapest; Referees: Georgios Stavridis (GRE), David Gómez (ESP)
1 July 2022; 14:30	Report	Đurđić 3	Goals	Jakšić, S. Rašović 3	Alfréd Hajós National Swimming Stadium, Budapest; Referees: Georgios Stavridis (GRE), David Gómez (ESP)

1 July 2022; 21:00	Report	Hungary	15–16 (PSO)	United States	Alfréd Hajós National Swimming Stadium, Budapest; Referees: Maro Savinović (CRO), Raffaele Colombo (ITA)
1 July 2022; 21:00	Report	Score by quarters: 4–3, 2–2, 2–3, 3–3 PSO: 4–5			Alfréd Hajós National Swimming Stadium, Budapest; Referees: Maro Savinović (CRO), Raffaele Colombo (ITA)
1 July 2022; 21:00	Report	Manhercz, Nagy 3	Goals	Daube 3	Alfréd Hajós National Swimming Stadium, Budapest; Referees: Maro Savinović (CRO), Raffaele Colombo (ITA)

=== Semifinals ===
1 July 2022; 16:00	Report	Italy	11–10	Greece	Alfréd Hajós National Swimming Stadium, Budapest; Referees: Michael Goldenberg (USA), Michiel Zwart (NED)
1 July 2022; 16:00	Report	Score by quarters: 4–2, 2–3, 1–1, 4–4			Alfréd Hajós National Swimming Stadium, Budapest; Referees: Michael Goldenberg (USA), Michiel Zwart (NED)
1 July 2022; 16:00	Report	Dolce 3	Goals	Vlachopoulos 3	Alfréd Hajós National Swimming Stadium, Budapest; Referees: Michael Goldenberg (USA), Michiel Zwart (NED)

1 July 2022; 19:30	Report	Spain	10–5	Croatia	Alfréd Hajós National Swimming Stadium, Budapest; Referees: Boris Margeta (SLO), Frank Ohme (GER)
1 July 2022; 19:30	Report	Score by quarters: 3–3, 4–2, 0–0, 3–0			Alfréd Hajós National Swimming Stadium, Budapest; Referees: Boris Margeta (SLO), Frank Ohme (GER)
1 July 2022; 19:30	Report	Granados 4	Goals	Bukić 2	Alfréd Hajós National Swimming Stadium, Budapest; Referees: Boris Margeta (SLO), Frank Ohme (GER)

=== 13th place game ===
29 June 2022; 15:30	Report	Germany	16–7	Kazakhstan	Szeged Tiszavirág Pool, Szeged; Referees: Levan Berishvili (GEO), Agustin Pinski (ARG)
29 June 2022; 15:30	Report	Score by quarters: 4–2, 4–2, 3–1, 5–2			Szeged Tiszavirág Pool, Szeged; Referees: Levan Berishvili (GEO), Agustin Pinski (ARG)
29 June 2022; 15:30	Report	Küppers 4	Goals	Shakenov 3	Szeged Tiszavirág Pool, Szeged; Referees: Levan Berishvili (GEO), Agustin Pinski (ARG)

=== Eleventh place game ===
1 July 2022; 17:00	Report	Australia	19–4	South Africa	Szeged Tiszavirág Pool, Szeged; Referees: Levan Berishvili (GEO), Agustin Pinski (ARG)
1 July 2022; 17:00	Report	Score by quarters: 3–2, 6–0, 4–1, 6–1			Szeged Tiszavirág Pool, Szeged; Referees: Levan Berishvili (GEO), Agustin Pinski (ARG)
1 July 2022; 17:00	Report	Pavillard 5	Goals	Swanepoel 2	Szeged Tiszavirág Pool, Szeged; Referees: Levan Berishvili (GEO), Agustin Pinski (ARG)

=== Ninth place game ===
1 July 2022; 18:30	Report	Japan	16–15	Georgia	Szeged Tiszavirág Pool, Szeged; Referees: Veselin Mišković (MNE), Ivan Raković (SRB)
1 July 2022; 18:30	Report	Score by quarters: 3–5, 7–4, 2–2, 4–4			Szeged Tiszavirág Pool, Szeged; Referees: Veselin Mišković (MNE), Ivan Raković (SRB)
1 July 2022; 18:30	Report	Adachi 5	Goals	Bitadze, Vapenski 4	Szeged Tiszavirág Pool, Szeged; Referees: Veselin Mišković (MNE), Ivan Raković (SRB)

=== Seventh place game ===
3 July 2022; 13:00	Report	Hungary	8–6	Montenegro	Alfréd Hajós National Swimming Stadium, Budapest; Referees: Levan Bertishvili (GEO), David Gómez (ESP)
3 July 2022; 13:00	Report	Score by quarters: 1–0, 4–2, 2–1, 1–3			Alfréd Hajós National Swimming Stadium, Budapest; Referees: Levan Bertishvili (GEO), David Gómez (ESP)
3 July 2022; 13:00	Report	Nagy, Zalánki 2	Goals	three players 2	Alfréd Hajós National Swimming Stadium, Budapest; Referees: Levan Bertishvili (GEO), David Gómez (ESP)

=== Fifth place game ===
3 July 2022; 17:00	Report	United States	10–13	Serbia	Alfréd Hajós National Swimming Stadium, Budapest; Referees: György Kun (HUN), Raffaele Colombo (ITA)
3 July 2022; 17:00	Report	Score by quarters: 3–3, 3–5, 1–3, 3–2			Alfréd Hajós National Swimming Stadium, Budapest; Referees: György Kun (HUN), Raffaele Colombo (ITA)
3 July 2022; 17:00	Report	Bowen 4	Goals	S. Rašović 4	Alfréd Hajós National Swimming Stadium, Budapest; Referees: György Kun (HUN), Raffaele Colombo (ITA)

=== Third place game ===
3 July 2022; 14:30	Report	Greece	9–7	Croatia	Alfréd Hajós National Swimming Stadium, Budapest; Referees: Frank Ohme (GER), Michiel Zwart (NED)
3 July 2022; 14:30	Report	Score by quarters: 1–0, 4–3, 3–2, 1–2			Alfréd Hajós National Swimming Stadium, Budapest; Referees: Frank Ohme (GER), Michiel Zwart (NED)
3 July 2022; 14:30	Report	Kakaris 3	Goals	Bukić 2	Alfréd Hajós National Swimming Stadium, Budapest; Referees: Frank Ohme (GER), Michiel Zwart (NED)

=== Final ===
3 July 2022; 20:00	Report	Italy	14–15 (PSO)	Spain	Alfréd Hajós National Swimming Stadium, Budapest; Referees: Boris Margeta (SLO), Georgios Stavridis (GRE)
3 July 2022; 20:00	Report	Score by quarters: 3–3, 0–3, 3–2, 3–1 PSO: 5–6			Alfréd Hajós National Swimming Stadium, Budapest; Referees: Boris Margeta (SLO), Georgios Stavridis (GRE)
3 July 2022; 20:00	Report	Cannella 2	Goals	Granados 4	Alfréd Hajós National Swimming Stadium, Budapest; Referees: Boris Margeta (SLO), Georgios Stavridis (GRE)

== Final ranking ==
Rank	Team
1st place, gold medalist(s)	Spain
2nd place, silver medalist(s)	Italy
3rd place, bronze medalist(s)	Greece
4	Croatia
5	Serbia
6	United States
7	Hungary
8	Montenegro
9	Japan
10	Georgia
11	Australia
12	South Africa
13	Germany
14	Kazakhstan
15	Brazil
16	Canada

2022 Men's Water Polo World Champions

Spain
Third title

Team roster: Unai Aguirre, Alberto Munarriz, Álvaro Granados, Bernat Sanahuja, Miguel de Toro, Marc Larumbe, Martin Famera, Sergi Cabanas, Roger Tahull, Felipe Perrone (c), Blai Mallarach, Alejandro Bustos, Eduardo Lorrio
Head coach: David Martin

== Medalists ==
Gold	Silver	Bronze
Spain Unai Aguirre; Alberto Munarriz; Álvaro Granados; Bernat Sanahuja; Miguel de Toro; Marc Larumbe; Martin Famera; Sergi Cabanas; Roger Tahull; Felipe Perrone (c); Blai Mallarach; Alejandro Bustos; Eduardo Lorrio Head coach: David Martin	Italy Marco Del Lungo (c); Francesco Di Fulvio; Luca Damonte; Matteo Iocchi Gratta; Andrea Fondelli; Giacomo Cannella; Luca Marziali; Gonzalo Echenique; Nicholas Presciutti; Lorenzo Bruni; Edoardo Di Somma; Vincenzo Dolce; Gianmarco Nicosia Head coach: Alessandro Campagna	Greece Manos Zerdevas; Dinos Genidounias; Dimitris Skoumpakis; Stathis Kalogeropoulos; Yiannis Fountoulis (c); Alexandros Papanastasiou; Giorgos Dervisis; Stelios Argyropoulos; Costas Gouvis; Costas Kakaris; Dimitris Nikolaidis; Angelos Vlachopoulos; Panagiotis Tzortzatos Head coach: Thodoris Vlachos

== Awards and statistics ==
=== Top goalscorers ===
Rank	Name	Goals	Shots	%
1	(United States) Alexander Bowen	21	43	49
2	(Spain) Álvaro Granados	18	38	37
3	(Georgia (country)) Boris Vapenski	17	47	36
3	(Serbia) Strahinja Rašović	17	36	47
5	(Croatia) Konstantin Kharkov	16	42	38
5	(Hungary) Gergő Zalánki	16	29	55
5	(Japan) Yusuke Inaba	16	47	34
8	(Greece) Stylianos Argyropoulos	15	30	50
8	(Greece) Angelos Vlachopoulos	15	30	50
10	(Italy) Francesco Di Fulvio	14	34	41
10	(Serbia) Dušan Mandić	14	32	44
10	(United States) Ben Hallock	14	26	54

=== Awards ===
The awards were announced on 3 July 2022.

Position	Player
Goalkeeper	(Spain) Unai Aguirre
Field player	(Croatia) Konstantin Kharkov
Field player	(Greece) Konstantinos Kakaris
Field player	(Italy) Francesco Di Fulvio
Field player	(Serbia) Strahinja Rašović
Field player	(Spain) Álvaro Granados
Field player	(United States) Alex Bowen
Most Valuable Goalkeeper	(Spain) Unai Aguirre
Most Valuable Player in Final	(Spain) Felipe Perrone
