= Croatia at the 2023 World Aquatics Championships =

- Flag of Croatia
- FINA code: CRO
- National federation: Croatian Swimming Federation
- Website: www.hrvatski-plivacki-savez.hr (in Croatian)

in Fukuoka, Japan
- Competitors: 23 in 5 sports
- Medals: Gold 0 Silver 0 Bronze 0 Total 0

World Aquatics Championships appearances
- 1994; 1998; 2001; 2003; 2005; 2007; 2009; 2011; 2013; 2015; 2017; 2019; 2022; 2023; 2024

Other related appearances
- Yugoslavia (1973–1991)

Croatia competed at the 2023 World Aquatics Championships in Fukuoka, Japan from 14 to 30 July.

== Artistic swimming ==
Croatia entered 1 artistic swimmer.

Women

Athlete	Event	Preliminaries		Final	
Athlete	Event	Points	Rank	Points	Rank
Matea Butorac	Solo free routine	166.7458	9 Q	151.1520	11

== Diving ==
Croatia entered 2 divers.

Men

Athlete	Event	Preliminaries		Semifinals		Final	
Athlete	Event	Points	Rank	Points	Rank	Points	Rank
David Ledinski	1 m springboard	288.55	38	—		Did not advance	
David Ledinski	3 m springboard	297.35	49	Did not advance			
Matej Neveščanin	1 m springboard	257.55	49	—		Did not advance	
Matej Neveščanin	3 m springboard	366.50	23	Did not advance			
David Ledinski; Matej Neveščanin	Synchronized 3 m springboard	335.73	15	—		Did not advance	

== Open water swimming ==
Croatia entered 2 open water swimmers.

Men

Athlete	Event	Time	Rank
Grgo Mujan	Men's 5 km	1:01:09.6	50

Women

Athlete	Event	Time	Rank
Klara Bošnjak	Women's 5 km	1:03:12.3	43

== Swimming ==
Croatia entered 3 swimmers.

Men

Athlete	Event	Heat		Semifinal		Final	
Athlete	Event	Time	Rank	Time	Rank	Time	Rank
Nikola Miljenić	50 metre freestyle	22.61	45	Did not advance			

Women

Athlete	Event	Heat		Semifinal		Final	
Athlete	Event	Time	Rank	Time	Rank	Time	Rank
Ana Blažević	100 metre breaststroke	1:08.70	30	Did not advance			
Ana Blažević	200 metre breaststroke	2:26.60	17	Did not advance			
Amina Kajtaz	100 metre butterfly	58.50 NR	14 Q	58.49 NR	14	Did not advance	
Amina Kajtaz	200 metre butterfly	2:12.57	21	Did not advance			

== Water polo ==
Summary

Team	Event	Group stage				Playoff	Quarterfinal	Semifinal	Final / BM	
Team	Event	Opposition Score	Opposition Score	Opposition Score	Rank	Opposition Score	Opposition Score	Opposition Score	Opposition Score	Rank
Croatia	Men's tournament	Argentina; W 24–5	Hungary; L 10–12	Japan; W 17–12	2 QP	Montenegro; L 12–13	—	Canada; W 13–5	Australia; W 17–10	9

=== Men's tournament ===
Team roster

The following is the Croatian roster.

Head coach: Ivica Tucak

- 1 Marko Bijač GK
- 2 Rino Burić FP
- 3 Marino Čagalj FP
- 4 Ivan Krapić FP
- 5 Franko Lazić FP
- 6 Luka Bukić FP
- 7 Ante Vukičević FP
- 8 Marko Žuvela FP
- 9 Jerko Marinić Kragić FP
- 10 Josip Vrlić FP
- 11 Andrija Bašić FP
- 12 Konstantin Kharkov FP
- 13 Toni Popadić GK
- Filip Kržić FP
- Zvonimir Butić FP

Group play

Pos	Team	Pld	W	PSW	PSL	L	GF	GA	GD	Pts	Qualification
1	Hungary	3	3	0	0	0	49	31	+18	9	Quarterfinals
2	Croatia	3	2	0	0	1	51	29	+22	6	Playoffs
3	Japan (H)	3	1	0	0	2	40	42	−2	3	Playoffs
4	Argentina	3	0	0	0	3	27	65	−38	0	

Source: Sportresult
Rules for classification: 1) points; 2) head-to-head points; 3) head-to-head goal difference; 4) head-to-head number of goals scored; 5) Goal difference.
(H) Host

17 July 2023; 16:00	Report	Argentina	5–24	Croatia	Marine Messe Fukuoka, Fukuoka; Referees: David Couper (NZL), Jennifer McCall (USA)
17 July 2023; 16:00	Report	Score by quarters: 2–8, 1–4, 0–7, 2–5			Marine Messe Fukuoka, Fukuoka; Referees: David Couper (NZL), Jennifer McCall (USA)
17 July 2023; 16:00	Report	five players 1	Goals	Marinić Kragić 5	Marine Messe Fukuoka, Fukuoka; Referees: David Couper (NZL), Jennifer McCall (USA)

19 July 2023; 12:00	Report	Croatia	10–12	Hungary	Marine Messe Fukuoka, Fukuoka; Referees: Adrian-Tiberiu Alexandrescu (ROU), Frank Ohme (GER)
19 July 2023; 12:00	Report	Score by quarters: 1–3, 2–2, 3–3, 4–4			Marine Messe Fukuoka, Fukuoka; Referees: Adrian-Tiberiu Alexandrescu (ROU), Frank Ohme (GER)
19 July 2023; 12:00	Report	three players 2	Goals	Zalánki 3	Marine Messe Fukuoka, Fukuoka; Referees: Adrian-Tiberiu Alexandrescu (ROU), Frank Ohme (GER)

21 July 2023; 19:00	Report	Croatia	17–12	Japan	Marine Messe Fukuoka, Fukuoka; Referees: Georgios Stavridis (GRE), Michiel Zwartt (NED)
21 July 2023; 19:00	Report	Score by quarters: 4–3, 3–3, 8–3, 2–3			Marine Messe Fukuoka, Fukuoka; Referees: Georgios Stavridis (GRE), Michiel Zwartt (NED)
21 July 2023; 19:00	Report	Kharkov 4	Goals	Adachi 4	Marine Messe Fukuoka, Fukuoka; Referees: Georgios Stavridis (GRE), Michiel Zwartt (NED)

Playoffs

23 July 2023; 17:00	Report	Croatia	12–13	Montenegro	Marine Messe Fukuoka, Fukuoka; Referees: Boris Margeta (SLO), Michiel Zwartt (NED)
23 July 2023; 17:00	Report	Score by quarters: 3–2, 0–3, 5–4, 4–4			Marine Messe Fukuoka, Fukuoka; Referees: Boris Margeta (SLO), Michiel Zwartt (NED)
23 July 2023; 17:00	Report	Marinić Kragić 4	Goals	Matković, Radović 4	Marine Messe Fukuoka, Fukuoka; Referees: Boris Margeta (SLO), Michiel Zwartt (NED)

9–12th place semifinals

25 July 2023; 12:00	Report	Canada	5–13	Croatia	Marine Messe Fukuoka, Fukuoka; Referees: Veselin Mišković (MNE), Zhang Liang (CHN)
25 July 2023; 12:00	Report	Score by quarters: 2–3, 1–3, 1–5, 1–2			Marine Messe Fukuoka, Fukuoka; Referees: Veselin Mišković (MNE), Zhang Liang (CHN)
25 July 2023; 12:00	Report	five players 1	Goals	Butić, Lazić 3	Marine Messe Fukuoka, Fukuoka; Referees: Veselin Mišković (MNE), Zhang Liang (CHN)

Ninth place game

27 July 2023; 10:30	Report	Croatia	17–10	Australia	Marine Messe Fukuoka, Fukuoka; Referees: Georgios Stavridis (GRE), Veselin Mišković (MNE)
27 July 2023; 10:30	Report	Score by quarters: 3–2, 5–4, 6–2, 3–2			Marine Messe Fukuoka, Fukuoka; Referees: Georgios Stavridis (GRE), Veselin Mišković (MNE)
27 July 2023; 10:30	Report	Vukičević 5	Goals	Poot 3	Marine Messe Fukuoka, Fukuoka; Referees: Georgios Stavridis (GRE), Veselin Mišković (MNE)
