= Water polo at the 2022 World Aquatics Championships – Women's tournament =

15th edition, held in Hungary

Tournament details
- Venues: 4 (in 4 host cities)
- Dates: 20 June – 2 July
- Teams: 16 (from 5 confederations)

Final positions
- Champions: United States (7th title)
- Runners-up: Hungary
- Third place: Netherlands
- Fourth place: Italy

Tournament statistics
- Matches played: 48
- Goals scored: 1,059 (22.06 per match)
- Top scorer(s): (Spain) Judith Forca (Spain) Beatriz Ortiz (21 goals)

Awards
- Best player: (United States) Maddie Musselman
- Best goalkeeper: (United States) Ashleigh Johnson

The women's water polo tournament at the 2022 World Aquatics Championships is held from 20 June to 2 July 2022. This is the 15th time that the women's water polo tournament has been played since the first edition in 1986.

The United States secured their fourth consecutive and seventh overall title with a win over Hungary, while the Netherlands beat Italy to win the bronze medal.

== Qualification ==
Event	Dates	Hosts	Quota	Qualifier(s)
Host nation	—N/a		1	Hungary
2020 FINA World League	14– 19 June 2021	(Greece) Athens	1	United States; ~~Russia~~
2020 Summer Olympics	24 July – 7 August 2021	(Japan) Tokyo	4	Spain; Australia; Netherlands; Canada
2020 Women's European Water Polo Championship	12–25 January 2020	(Hungary) Budapest	3	Italy; Greece; France
2022 Intercontinental Cup (Americas qualifier)	7–13 March 2022	(Peru) Lima	2	Brazil; Argentina
Asian Qualifier	—N/a		1	~~China~~; ~~Japan~~; Kazakhstan
African Qualifier	—N/a		1	South Africa
Oceanian Qualifier	—N/a		1	New Zealand
Wild cards	—N/a		2	Colombia; Thailand
Total			16	

Russia was excluded due to the 2022 Russian invasion of Ukraine.
Due the COVID-19 pandemic local restritictions China and Japan withdrew before the tournament.

== Draw ==
The draw was held on 12 April 2022.

=== Seeding ===
Pot 1	Pot 2	Pot 3	Pot 4
United States; Spain; Hungary; Australia	Netherlands; Canada; Brazil; Greece	Argentina; Italy; France; New Zealand	Kazakhstan; Colombia; Thailand; South Africa

== Preliminary round ==
=== Group A ===
Pos	Team	Pld	W	D	L	GF	GA	GD	Pts	Qualification
1	Italy	3	2	1	0	48	21	+27	5	Quarterfinals
2	Hungary (H)	3	2	0	1	55	21	+34	4	Playoffs
3	Canada	3	1	1	1	36	20	+16	3	Playoffs
4	Colombia	3	0	0	3	11	88	−77	0	

Source: Sportresult
Rules for classification: 1) points; 2) head-to-head points; 3) head-to-head goal difference; 4) head-to-head number of goals scored; 5) Goal difference.
(H) Hosts

20 June 2022; 19:30	Report	Canada	7–7	Italy	Alfréd Hajós National Swimming Stadium, Budapest; Referees: Georgios Stavridis (GRE), Andrew Carney (AUS)
20 June 2022; 19:30	Report	Score by quarters: 2–4, 3–2, 1–1, 1–0			Alfréd Hajós National Swimming Stadium, Budapest; Referees: Georgios Stavridis (GRE), Andrew Carney (AUS)
20 June 2022; 19:30	Report	McKelvey, Wright 2	Goals	Giustini 2	Alfréd Hajós National Swimming Stadium, Budapest; Referees: Georgios Stavridis (GRE), Andrew Carney (AUS)

20 June 2022; 21:00	Report	Hungary	35–4	Colombia	Alfréd Hajós National Swimming Stadium, Budapest; Referees: Pascal Bouchez (FRA), Maro Savinović (CRO)
20 June 2022; 21:00	Report	Score by quarters: 8–2, 12–0, 7–0, 8–2			Alfréd Hajós National Swimming Stadium, Budapest; Referees: Pascal Bouchez (FRA), Maro Savinović (CRO)
20 June 2022; 21:00	Report	Rybanská 6	Goals	Vanegas 2	Alfréd Hajós National Swimming Stadium, Budapest; Referees: Pascal Bouchez (FRA), Maro Savinović (CRO)

22 June 2022; 19:30	Report	Colombia	2–22	Canada	Alfréd Hajós National Swimming Stadium, Budapest; Referees: Anbar Anbar (KUW), Dion Willis (RSA)
22 June 2022; 19:30	Report	Score by quarters: 1–3, 1–5, 0–7, 0–7			Alfréd Hajós National Swimming Stadium, Budapest; Referees: Anbar Anbar (KUW), Dion Willis (RSA)
22 June 2022; 19:30	Report	Ortega, Restrepo 1	Goals	McKelvey 5	Alfréd Hajós National Swimming Stadium, Budapest; Referees: Anbar Anbar (KUW), Dion Willis (RSA)

22 June 2022; 21:00	Report	Italy	10–9	Hungary	Alfréd Hajós National Swimming Stadium, Budapest; Referees: Boris Margeta (SLO), Andrew Carney (AUS)
22 June 2022; 21:00	Report	Score by quarters: 3–4, 2–2, 3–1, 2–2			Alfréd Hajós National Swimming Stadium, Budapest; Referees: Boris Margeta (SLO), Andrew Carney (AUS)
22 June 2022; 21:00	Report	Avegno, Marletta 2	Goals	Parkes 3	Alfréd Hajós National Swimming Stadium, Budapest; Referees: Boris Margeta (SLO), Andrew Carney (AUS)

24 June 2022; 19:30	Report	Italy	31–5	Colombia	Alfréd Hajós National Swimming Stadium, Budapest; Referees: Anbar Anbar (KUW), Dion Willis (RSA)
24 June 2022; 19:30	Report	Score by quarters: 5–2, 7–0, 6–2, 13–1			Alfréd Hajós National Swimming Stadium, Budapest; Referees: Anbar Anbar (KUW), Dion Willis (RSA)
24 June 2022; 19:30	Report	Avegno 6	Goals	Restrepo 2	Alfréd Hajós National Swimming Stadium, Budapest; Referees: Anbar Anbar (KUW), Dion Willis (RSA)

24 June 2022; 21:00	Report	Hungary	11–7	Canada	Alfréd Hajós National Swimming Stadium, Budapest; Referees: Michiel Zwart (NED), Frank Ohme (GER)
24 June 2022; 21:00	Report	Score by quarters: 2–1, 3–3, 4–0, 2–3			Alfréd Hajós National Swimming Stadium, Budapest; Referees: Michiel Zwart (NED), Frank Ohme (GER)
24 June 2022; 21:00	Report	Keszthelyi 3	Goals	McKelvey 3	Alfréd Hajós National Swimming Stadium, Budapest; Referees: Michiel Zwart (NED), Frank Ohme (GER)

=== Group B ===
Pos	Team	Pld	W	D	L	GF	GA	GD	Pts	Qualification
1	United States	3	3	0	0	58	12	+46	6	Quarterfinals
2	Netherlands	3	2	0	1	58	18	+40	4	Playoffs
3	Argentina	3	1	0	2	16	58	−42	2	Playoffs
4	South Africa	3	0	0	3	9	53	−44	0	

Source: Sportresult
Rules for classification: 1) points; 2) head-to-head points; 3) head-to-head goal difference; 4) head-to-head number of goals scored; 5) Goal difference.

20 June 2022; 18:00	Report	South Africa	2–24	United States	Debrecen Swimming Pool Complex, Debrecen; Referees: Megan Perry (NZL), Ivan Raković (SRB)
20 June 2022; 18:00	Report	Score by quarters: 0–7, 0–10, 1–3, 1–4			Debrecen Swimming Pool Complex, Debrecen; Referees: Megan Perry (NZL), Ivan Raković (SRB)
20 June 2022; 18:00	Report	Meecham, Zondo 1	Goals	Haralabidis 5	Debrecen Swimming Pool Complex, Debrecen; Referees: Megan Perry (NZL), Ivan Raković (SRB)

20 June 2022; 19:30	Report	Netherlands	29–6	Argentina	Debrecen Swimming Pool Complex, Debrecen; Referees: Harvey Hinds (CUR), Edgar Baron (COL)
20 June 2022; 19:30	Report	Score by quarters: 8–1, 8–1, 6–2, 7–2			Debrecen Swimming Pool Complex, Debrecen; Referees: Harvey Hinds (CUR), Edgar Baron (COL)
20 June 2022; 19:30	Report	Van de Kraats 5	Goals	Ruiz 3	Debrecen Swimming Pool Complex, Debrecen; Referees: Harvey Hinds (CUR), Edgar Baron (COL)

22 June 2022; 18:00	Report	Argentina	7–6	South Africa	Debrecen Swimming Pool Complex, Debrecen; Referees: Adil Aimbetov (KAZ), Edgar Baron (COL)
22 June 2022; 18:00	Report	Score by quarters: 1–1, 1–2, 3–1, 2–2			Debrecen Swimming Pool Complex, Debrecen; Referees: Adil Aimbetov (KAZ), Edgar Baron (COL)
22 June 2022; 18:00	Report	Leonard 3	Goals	Vaughan 2	Debrecen Swimming Pool Complex, Debrecen; Referees: Adil Aimbetov (KAZ), Edgar Baron (COL)

22 June 2022; 19:30	Report	United States	11–7	Netherlands	Debrecen Swimming Pool Complex, Debrecen; Referees: Ivan Raković (SRB), Megan Perry (NZL)
22 June 2022; 19:30	Report	Score by quarters: 3–2, 3–1, 3–2, 2–2			Debrecen Swimming Pool Complex, Debrecen; Referees: Ivan Raković (SRB), Megan Perry (NZL)
22 June 2022; 19:30	Report	Musselman 4	Goals	Van de Kraats, Moolhuijzen 2	Debrecen Swimming Pool Complex, Debrecen; Referees: Ivan Raković (SRB), Megan Perry (NZL)

24 June 2022; 18:00	Report	United States	23–3	Argentina	Debrecen Swimming Pool Complex, Debrecen; Referees: Harvey Hinds (CUR), Megan Perry (NZL)
24 June 2022; 18:00	Report	Score by quarters: 6–0, 5–0, 6–2, 6–1			Debrecen Swimming Pool Complex, Debrecen; Referees: Harvey Hinds (CUR), Megan Perry (NZL)
24 June 2022; 18:00	Report	Haralabidis, Weber 4	Goals	three players 1	Debrecen Swimming Pool Complex, Debrecen; Referees: Harvey Hinds (CUR), Megan Perry (NZL)

24 June 2022; 19:30	Report	Netherlands	22–1	South Africa	Debrecen Swimming Pool Complex, Debrecen; Referees: Ivan Raković (SRB), Edgar Baron (COL)
24 June 2022; 19:30	Report	Score by quarters: 5–1, 4–0, 7–0, 6–0			Debrecen Swimming Pool Complex, Debrecen; Referees: Ivan Raković (SRB), Edgar Baron (COL)
24 June 2022; 19:30	Report	Moolhuijzen 5	Goals	Versfeld 1	Debrecen Swimming Pool Complex, Debrecen; Referees: Ivan Raković (SRB), Edgar Baron (COL)

=== Group C ===
Pos	Team	Pld	W	D	L	GF	GA	GD	Pts	Qualification
1	Australia	3	3	0	0	47	13	+34	6	Quarterfinals
2	New Zealand	3	2	0	1	29	30	−1	4	Playoffs
3	Kazakhstan	3	1	0	2	27	40	−13	2	Playoffs
4	Brazil	3	0	0	3	19	39	−20	0	

Source: Sportresult
Rules for classification: 1) points; 2) head-to-head points; 3) head-to-head goal difference; 4) head-to-head number of goals scored; 5) Goal difference.

20 June 2022; 18:00	Report	New Zealand	12–8	Brazil	Sopron Lőver Pool, Sopron; Referees: Radu Matache (ROU), Agustin Pinski (ARG)
20 June 2022; 18:00	Report	Score by quarters: 3–3, 5–2, 3–3, 1–0			Sopron Lőver Pool, Sopron; Referees: Radu Matache (ROU), Agustin Pinski (ARG)
20 June 2022; 18:00	Report	McDowall 4	Goals	Leão 3	Sopron Lőver Pool, Sopron; Referees: Radu Matache (ROU), Agustin Pinski (ARG)

20 June 2022; 19:30	Report	Kazakhstan	6–19	Australia	Sopron Lőver Pool, Sopron; Referees: György Kun (HUN), Chisato Kurosaki (JPN)
20 June 2022; 19:30	Report	Score by quarters: 1–6, 1–9, 3–3, 1–1			Sopron Lőver Pool, Sopron; Referees: György Kun (HUN), Chisato Kurosaki (JPN)
20 June 2022; 19:30	Report	Yeremina 3	Goals	Arancini 5	Sopron Lőver Pool, Sopron; Referees: György Kun (HUN), Chisato Kurosaki (JPN)

22 June 2022; 18:00	Report	Australia	11–2	New Zealand	Sopron Lőver Pool, Sopron; Referees: Asumi Tsuzaki (JPN), Agustin Pinski (ARG)
22 June 2022; 18:00	Report	Score by quarters: 3–1, 4–1, 3–0, 1–0			Sopron Lőver Pool, Sopron; Referees: Asumi Tsuzaki (JPN), Agustin Pinski (ARG)
22 June 2022; 18:00	Report	Halligan 3	Goals	McDowall, Nicholson 1	Sopron Lőver Pool, Sopron; Referees: Asumi Tsuzaki (JPN), Agustin Pinski (ARG)

22 June 2022; 19:30	Report	Brazil	6–10	Kazakhstan	Sopron Lőver Pool, Sopron; Referees: Radu Matache (ROU), Georgios Stavridis (GRE)
22 June 2022; 19:30	Report	Score by quarters: 2–3, 2–2, 1–1, 1–4			Sopron Lőver Pool, Sopron; Referees: Radu Matache (ROU), Georgios Stavridis (GRE)
22 June 2022; 19:30	Report	Coutinho 2	Goals	Turova, Yeremina 3	Sopron Lőver Pool, Sopron; Referees: Radu Matache (ROU), Georgios Stavridis (GRE)

24 June 2022; 18:00	Report	Brazil	5–17	Australia	Sopron Lőver Pool, Sopron; Referees: György Kun (HUN), Asumi Tsuzaki (JPN)
24 June 2022; 18:00	Report	Score by quarters: 1–5, 0–4, 1–5, 3–3			Sopron Lőver Pool, Sopron; Referees: György Kun (HUN), Asumi Tsuzaki (JPN)
24 June 2022; 18:00	Report	Belorio 2	Goals	Halligan 5	Sopron Lőver Pool, Sopron; Referees: György Kun (HUN), Asumi Tsuzaki (JPN)

24 June 2022; 19:30	Report	Kazakhstan	11–15	New Zealand	Sopron Lőver Pool, Sopron; Referees: Maro Savinović (CRO), Agustin Pinski (ARG)
24 June 2022; 19:30	Report	Score by quarters: 3–4, 5–2, 2–5, 1–4			Sopron Lőver Pool, Sopron; Referees: Maro Savinović (CRO), Agustin Pinski (ARG)
24 June 2022; 19:30	Report	Muravyeva 3	Goals	Josephson 4	Sopron Lőver Pool, Sopron; Referees: Maro Savinović (CRO), Agustin Pinski (ARG)

=== Group D ===
Pos	Team	Pld	W	D	L	GF	GA	GD	Pts	Qualification
1	Greece	3	2	1	0	53	15	+38	5 (Note: Spain 10–10 Greece)	Quarterfinals
2	Spain	3	2	1	0	58	20	+38	5	Playoffs
3	France	3	1	0	2	36	41	−5	2	Playoffs
4	Thailand	3	0	0	3	11	82	−71	0	

Source: Sportresult
Rules for classification: 1) points; 2) head-to-head points; 3) head-to-head goal difference; 4) head-to-head number of goals scored; 5) Goal difference.
Notes:

20 June 2022; 18:00	Report	Greece	28–1	Thailand	Szeged Tiszavirag Pool, Szeged; Referees: Helene Painchaud (CAN), Fabio Toffoli (BRA)
20 June 2022; 18:00	Report	Score by quarters: 7–0, 9–0, 5–0, 7–1			Szeged Tiszavirag Pool, Szeged; Referees: Helene Painchaud (CAN), Fabio Toffoli (BRA)
20 June 2022; 18:00	Report	Xenaki 5	Goals	Puangtong 1	Szeged Tiszavirag Pool, Szeged; Referees: Helene Painchaud (CAN), Fabio Toffoli (BRA)

20 June 2022; 19:30	Report	France	8–18	Spain	Szeged Tiszavirag Pool, Szeged; Referees: Levan Berishvili (GEO), Raffaele Colombo (ITA)
20 June 2022; 19:30	Report	Score by quarters: 1–4, 3–3, 2–5, 2–6			Szeged Tiszavirag Pool, Szeged; Referees: Levan Berishvili (GEO), Raffaele Colombo (ITA)
20 June 2022; 19:30	Report	Vernoux 4	Goals	Forca 5	Szeged Tiszavirag Pool, Szeged; Referees: Levan Berishvili (GEO), Raffaele Colombo (ITA)

22 June 2022; 18:00	Report	Spain	10–10	Greece	Szeged Tiszavirag Pool, Szeged; Referees: Levan Berishvili (GEO), Veselin Mišković (MNE)
22 June 2022; 18:00	Report	Score by quarters: 2–3, 4–3, 2–2, 2–2			Szeged Tiszavirag Pool, Szeged; Referees: Levan Berishvili (GEO), Veselin Mišković (MNE)
22 June 2022; 18:00	Report	Ruiz 4	Goals	E. Plevritou, V. Plevritou 3	Szeged Tiszavirag Pool, Szeged; Referees: Levan Berishvili (GEO), Veselin Mišković (MNE)

22 June 2022; 19:30	Report	Thailand	8–24	France	Szeged Tiszavirag Pool, Szeged; Referees: Hélène Painchaud (CAN), Fabio Toffoli (BRA)
22 June 2022; 19:30	Report	Score by quarters: 2–6, 2–7, 0–7, 4–4			Szeged Tiszavirag Pool, Szeged; Referees: Hélène Painchaud (CAN), Fabio Toffoli (BRA)
22 June 2022; 19:30	Report	Puangtong 4	Goals	Guillet 6	Szeged Tiszavirag Pool, Szeged; Referees: Hélène Painchaud (CAN), Fabio Toffoli (BRA)

24 June 2022; 18:00	Report	Thailand	2–30	Spain	Szeged Tiszavirag Pool, Szeged; Referees: Fabio Toffoli (BRA), Veselin Mišković (MNE)
24 June 2022; 18:00	Report	Score by quarters: 0–5, 0–7, 2–11, 0–7			Szeged Tiszavirag Pool, Szeged; Referees: Fabio Toffoli (BRA), Veselin Mišković (MNE)
24 June 2022; 18:00	Report	Puangtong 2	Goals	Forca 7	Szeged Tiszavirag Pool, Szeged; Referees: Fabio Toffoli (BRA), Veselin Mišković (MNE)

24 June 2022; 19:30	Report	France	4–15	Greece	Szeged Tiszavirag Pool, Szeged; Referees: Hélène Painchaud (CAN), Raffaele Colombo (ITA)
24 June 2022; 19:30	Report	Score by quarters: 1–4, 1–4, 1–3, 1–4			Szeged Tiszavirag Pool, Szeged; Referees: Hélène Painchaud (CAN), Raffaele Colombo (ITA)
24 June 2022; 19:30	Report	Bouloukbachi 2	Goals	three players 3	Szeged Tiszavirag Pool, Szeged; Referees: Hélène Painchaud (CAN), Raffaele Colombo (ITA)

== Knockout stage ==
=== Bracket ===
Championship bracket

Playoffs
26 June
New Zealand	9 (4)
France (PSO)	9 (5)
26 June
Kazakhstan	1
Spain	14
26 June
Hungary	23
Argentina	6
26 June
Canada	7
Netherlands	10

Quarter-finals
28 June
Italy	17
France	7
28 June
United States	13
Spain	8
28 June
Australia	6
Hungary	7
28 June
Greece	7
Netherlands	12

Semi-finals
30 June
Italy	6
United States	14
30 June
Hungary	13
Netherlands	12

Final
2 July
United States	9
Hungary	7
Third place
2 July
Italy	5
Netherlands	7

5th place bracket

5th–8th place semifinals
30 June
France	5
Spain	18
30 June
Australia (PSO)	12 (4)
Greece	12 (2)

Fifth place game
2 July
Spain	8
Australia	5
Seventh place game
2 July
France	7
Greece	16

9th place bracket

9th–12th place semifinals
28 June
Argentina	7
New Zealand	13
28 June
Kazakhstan	11
Canada	19

Ninth place game
30 June
New Zealand	11
Canada	20
Eleventh place game
30 June
Argentina	6
Kazakhstan	12

13th place bracket

13th–16th place semifinals
26 June
Colombia	11
South Africa	14
26 June
Brazil	12
Thailand	9

13th place game
28 June
South Africa	8
Brazil	7
15th place game
28 June
Colombia	6
Thailand	10

=== Playoffs ===
26 June 2022; 14:00	Report	Canada	7–10	Netherlands	Alfréd Hajós National Swimming Stadium, Budapest; Referees: Raffaele Colombo (ITA), David Gómez (ESP)
26 June 2022; 14:00	Report	Score by quarters: 2–1, 1–2, 2–6, 2–1			Alfréd Hajós National Swimming Stadium, Budapest; Referees: Raffaele Colombo (ITA), David Gómez (ESP)
26 June 2022; 14:00	Report	seven players 1	Goals	three players 2	Alfréd Hajós National Swimming Stadium, Budapest; Referees: Raffaele Colombo (ITA), David Gómez (ESP)

26 June 2022; 15:30	Report	New Zealand	13–14 (PSO)	France	Alfréd Hajós National Swimming Stadium, Budapest; Referees: Georgios Stavridis (GRE), Adil Aimbetov (KAZ)
26 June 2022; 15:30	Report	Score by quarters: 2–1, 3–3, 2–3, 2–2 PSO: 4–5			Alfréd Hajós National Swimming Stadium, Budapest; Referees: Georgios Stavridis (GRE), Adil Aimbetov (KAZ)
26 June 2022; 15:30	Report	McDowall 5	Goals	Dhalluin 4	Alfréd Hajós National Swimming Stadium, Budapest; Referees: Georgios Stavridis (GRE), Adil Aimbetov (KAZ)

26 June 2022; 17:00	Report	Kazakhstan	1–14	Spain	Alfréd Hajós National Swimming Stadium, Budapest; Referees: Helene Painchaud (CAN), Harvey Hinds (CUR)
26 June 2022; 17:00	Report	Score by quarters: 0–4, 1–2, 0–7, 0–1			Alfréd Hajós National Swimming Stadium, Budapest; Referees: Helene Painchaud (CAN), Harvey Hinds (CUR)
26 June 2022; 17:00	Report	Turova 1	Goals	Ortiz 4	Alfréd Hajós National Swimming Stadium, Budapest; Referees: Helene Painchaud (CAN), Harvey Hinds (CUR)

26 June 2022; 18:30	Report	Hungary	23–6	Argentina	Alfréd Hajós National Swimming Stadium, Budapest; Referees: Dion Willis (RSA), Maro Savinović (CRO)
26 June 2022; 18:30	Report	Score by quarters: 4–0, 7–2, 6–3, 6–1			Alfréd Hajós National Swimming Stadium, Budapest; Referees: Dion Willis (RSA), Maro Savinović (CRO)
26 June 2022; 18:30	Report	Gurisatti 5	Goals	Leonard 3	Alfréd Hajós National Swimming Stadium, Budapest; Referees: Dion Willis (RSA), Maro Savinović (CRO)

=== Quarterfinals ===
28 June 2022; 13:00	Report	Italy	17–7	France	Alfréd Hajós National Swimming Stadium, Budapest; Referees: Helene Painchaud (CAN), Maro Savinović (CRO)
28 June 2022; 13:00	Report	Score by quarters: 3–2, 4–1, 6–1, 4–3			Alfréd Hajós National Swimming Stadium, Budapest; Referees: Helene Painchaud (CAN), Maro Savinović (CRO)
28 June 2022; 13:00	Report	Giustini 6	Goals	Guillet 4	Alfréd Hajós National Swimming Stadium, Budapest; Referees: Helene Painchaud (CAN), Maro Savinović (CRO)

28 June 2022; 16:00	Report	United States	13–8	Spain	Alfréd Hajós National Swimming Stadium, Budapest; Referees: Georgios Stavridis (GRE), Frank Ohme (GER)
28 June 2022; 16:00	Report	Score by quarters: 3–3, 3–2, 5–3, 2–0			Alfréd Hajós National Swimming Stadium, Budapest; Referees: Georgios Stavridis (GRE), Frank Ohme (GER)
28 June 2022; 16:00	Report	Haralabidis 6	Goals	Forca, García Godoy 2	Alfréd Hajós National Swimming Stadium, Budapest; Referees: Georgios Stavridis (GRE), Frank Ohme (GER)

28 June 2022; 19:30	Report	Greece	7–12	Netherlands	Alfréd Hajós National Swimming Stadium, Budapest; Referees: David Gómez (ESP), Boris Margeta (SLO)
28 June 2022; 19:30	Report	Score by quarters: 1–3, 2–3, 3–3, 1–3			Alfréd Hajós National Swimming Stadium, Budapest; Referees: David Gómez (ESP), Boris Margeta (SLO)
28 June 2022; 19:30	Report	Patra, E. Plevritou 2	Goals	Moolhuijzen 4	Alfréd Hajós National Swimming Stadium, Budapest; Referees: David Gómez (ESP), Boris Margeta (SLO)

28 June 2022; 21:00	Report	Australia	6–7	Hungary	Alfréd Hajós National Swimming Stadium, Budapest; Referees: Michael Goldenberg (USA), Raffaele Colombo (ITA)
28 June 2022; 21:00	Report	Score by quarters: 3–2, 0–1, 0–2, 3–2			Alfréd Hajós National Swimming Stadium, Budapest; Referees: Michael Goldenberg (USA), Raffaele Colombo (ITA)
28 June 2022; 21:00	Report	Halligan 3	Goals	Keszthelyi 3	Alfréd Hajós National Swimming Stadium, Budapest; Referees: Michael Goldenberg (USA), Raffaele Colombo (ITA)

=== 13–16th place semifinals ===
26 June 2022; 17:00	Report	Colombia	11–14	South Africa	Szeged Tiszavirag Pool, Szeged; Referees: Asumi Tsuzaki (JPN), Pascal Bouchez (FRA)
26 June 2022; 17:00	Report	Score by quarters: 3–4, 3–5, 3–3, 2–2			Szeged Tiszavirag Pool, Szeged; Referees: Asumi Tsuzaki (JPN), Pascal Bouchez (FRA)
26 June 2022; 17:00	Report	Marín, Vanegas 3	Goals	MacLeod 4	Szeged Tiszavirag Pool, Szeged; Referees: Asumi Tsuzaki (JPN), Pascal Bouchez (FRA)

26 June 2022; 18:30	Report	Brazil	12–9	Thailand	Szeged Tiszavirag Pool, Szeged; Referees: Megan Perry (NZL), Anbar Anbar (KUW)
26 June 2022; 18:30	Report	Score by quarters: 4–1, 4–1, 3–3, 1–4			Szeged Tiszavirag Pool, Szeged; Referees: Megan Perry (NZL), Anbar Anbar (KUW)
26 June 2022; 18:30	Report	Ferreira 6	Goals	Puangton, Turon 4	Szeged Tiszavirag Pool, Szeged; Referees: Megan Perry (NZL), Anbar Anbar (KUW)

=== 9–12th place semifinals ===
28 June 2022; 17:00	Report	Argentina	7–13	New Zealand	Szeged Tiszavirag Pool, Szeged; Referees: Levan Berishvili (GEO), Radu Matache (ROU)
28 June 2022; 17:00	Report	Score by quarters: 3–3, 2–4, 1–4, 1–2			Szeged Tiszavirag Pool, Szeged; Referees: Levan Berishvili (GEO), Radu Matache (ROU)
28 June 2022; 17:00	Report	Ruiz 3	Goals	five players 2	Szeged Tiszavirag Pool, Szeged; Referees: Levan Berishvili (GEO), Radu Matache (ROU)

28 June 2022; 18:30	Report	Canada	19–11	Kazakhstan	Szeged Tiszavirag Pool, Szeged; Referees: Ivan Raković (SRB), Fabio Toffoli (BRA)
28 June 2022; 18:30	Report	Score by quarters: 3–2, 6–3, 5–3, 5–3			Szeged Tiszavirag Pool, Szeged; Referees: Ivan Raković (SRB), Fabio Toffoli (BRA)
28 June 2022; 18:30	Report	three players 4	Goals	Yeremina 3	Szeged Tiszavirag Pool, Szeged; Referees: Ivan Raković (SRB), Fabio Toffoli (BRA)

=== 5–8th place semifinals ===
30 June 2022; 14:30	Report	France	5–18	Spain	Alfréd Hajós National Swimming Stadium, Budapest; Referees: Adil Aimbetov (KAZ), Dion Willis (RSA)
30 June 2022; 14:30	Report	Score by quarters: 1–3, 2–3, 1–5, 1–7			Alfréd Hajós National Swimming Stadium, Budapest; Referees: Adil Aimbetov (KAZ), Dion Willis (RSA)
30 June 2022; 14:30	Report	five players 1	Goals	four players 3	Alfréd Hajós National Swimming Stadium, Budapest; Referees: Adil Aimbetov (KAZ), Dion Willis (RSA)

30 June 2022; 19:30	Report	Australia	16–14 (PSO)	Greece	Alfréd Hajós National Swimming Stadium, Budapest; Referees: Raffaele Colombo (ITA), György Kun (HUN)
30 June 2022; 19:30	Report	Score by quarters: 2–2, 4–2, 4–4, 2–4 PSO: 4–2			Alfréd Hajós National Swimming Stadium, Budapest; Referees: Raffaele Colombo (ITA), György Kun (HUN)
30 June 2022; 19:30	Report	Leeson-Smith, Ridge 3	Goals	Xenaki 4	Alfréd Hajós National Swimming Stadium, Budapest; Referees: Raffaele Colombo (ITA), György Kun (HUN)

=== Semifinals ===
30 June 2022; 16:00	Report	Italy	6–14	United States	Alfréd Hajós National Swimming Stadium, Budapest; Referees: Georgios Stavridis (GRE), David Gómez (ESP)
30 June 2022; 16:00	Report	Score by quarters: 0–3, 2–3, 1–4, 3–4			Alfréd Hajós National Swimming Stadium, Budapest; Referees: Georgios Stavridis (GRE), David Gómez (ESP)
30 June 2022; 16:00	Report	Avegno, Bianconi 2	Goals	five players 2	Alfréd Hajós National Swimming Stadium, Budapest; Referees: Georgios Stavridis (GRE), David Gómez (ESP)

30 June 2022; 21:00	Report	Hungary	13–12	Netherlands	Alfréd Hajós National Swimming Stadium, Budapest; Referees: Maro Savinović (CRO), Frank Ohme (GER)
30 June 2022; 21:00	Report	Score by quarters: 2–3, 4–3, 5–4, 2–2			Alfréd Hajós National Swimming Stadium, Budapest; Referees: Maro Savinović (CRO), Frank Ohme (GER)
30 June 2022; 21:00	Report	Leimeter 4	Goals	Van de Kraats 5	Alfréd Hajós National Swimming Stadium, Budapest; Referees: Maro Savinović (CRO), Frank Ohme (GER)

=== 15th place game ===
28 June 2022; 14:00	Report	Colombia	6–10	Thailand	Szeged Tiszavirag Pool, Szeged; Referees: Asumi Tsuzaki (JPN), Agustin Pinski (ARG)
28 June 2022; 14:00	Report	Score by quarters: 2–2, 2–1, 2–2, 0–5			Szeged Tiszavirag Pool, Szeged; Referees: Asumi Tsuzaki (JPN), Agustin Pinski (ARG)
28 June 2022; 14:00	Report	Restrepo 5	Goals	Puengpongsakul 3	Szeged Tiszavirag Pool, Szeged; Referees: Asumi Tsuzaki (JPN), Agustin Pinski (ARG)

=== 13th place game ===
28 June 2022; 15:30	Report	South Africa	8–7	Brazil	Szeged Tiszavirag Pool, Szeged; Referees: Megan Perry (NZL), Veselin Mišković (MNE)
28 June 2022; 15:30	Report	Score by quarters: 2–2, 3–3, 0–1, 3–1			Szeged Tiszavirag Pool, Szeged; Referees: Megan Perry (NZL), Veselin Mišković (MNE)
28 June 2022; 15:30	Report	January 2	Goals	Coutinho 3	Szeged Tiszavirag Pool, Szeged; Referees: Megan Perry (NZL), Veselin Mišković (MNE)

=== Eleventh place game ===
30 June 2022; 17:00	Report	Argentina	6–12	Kazakhstan	Szeged Tiszavirag Pool, Szeged; Referees: Levan Berishvili (GEO), Edgar Baron (COL)
30 June 2022; 17:00	Report	Score by quarters: 2–4, 1–3, 1–3, 2–2			Szeged Tiszavirag Pool, Szeged; Referees: Levan Berishvili (GEO), Edgar Baron (COL)
30 June 2022; 17:00	Report	Leonard 3	Goals	Roga 5	Szeged Tiszavirag Pool, Szeged; Referees: Levan Berishvili (GEO), Edgar Baron (COL)

=== Ninth place game ===
30 June 2022; 18:30	Report	New Zealand	11–20	Canada	Szeged Tiszavirag Pool, Szeged; Referees: Pascal Bouchez (FRA), Veselin Mišković (MNE)
30 June 2022; 18:30	Report	Score by quarters: 1–4, 1–5, 5–6, 4–5			Szeged Tiszavirag Pool, Szeged; Referees: Pascal Bouchez (FRA), Veselin Mišković (MNE)
30 June 2022; 18:30	Report	Houghton 6	Goals	Lekness 4	Szeged Tiszavirag Pool, Szeged; Referees: Pascal Bouchez (FRA), Veselin Mišković (MNE)

=== Seventh place game ===
2 July 2022; 13:00	Report	France	7–16	Greece	Alfréd Hajós National Swimming Stadium, Budapest; Referees: Veselin Mišković (MNE), Dion Willis (RSA)
2 July 2022; 13:00	Report	Score by quarters: 2–5, 1–3, 2–5, 2–3			Alfréd Hajós National Swimming Stadium, Budapest; Referees: Veselin Mišković (MNE), Dion Willis (RSA)
2 July 2022; 13:00	Report	Millot 3	Goals	Myriokefalitaki 5	Alfréd Hajós National Swimming Stadium, Budapest; Referees: Veselin Mišković (MNE), Dion Willis (RSA)

=== Fifth place game ===
2 July 2022; 17:00	Report	Spain	8–5	Australia	Alfréd Hajós National Swimming Stadium, Budapest; Referees: Helene Painchaud (CAN), Ivan Raković (SRB)
2 July 2022; 17:00	Report	Score by quarters: 2–0, 1–1, 3–1, 2–3			Alfréd Hajós National Swimming Stadium, Budapest; Referees: Helene Painchaud (CAN), Ivan Raković (SRB)
2 July 2022; 17:00	Report	three players 2	Goals	five players 1	Alfréd Hajós National Swimming Stadium, Budapest; Referees: Helene Painchaud (CAN), Ivan Raković (SRB)

=== Third place game ===
2 July 2022; 14:30	Report	Italy	5–7	Netherlands	Alfréd Hajós National Swimming Stadium, Budapest; Referees: Maro Savinović (CRO), Georgios Stavridis (GRE)
2 July 2022; 14:30	Report	Score by quarters: 2–1, 2–1, 0–2, 1–3			Alfréd Hajós National Swimming Stadium, Budapest; Referees: Maro Savinović (CRO), Georgios Stavridis (GRE)
2 July 2022; 14:30	Report	Giustini, Marletta 2	Goals	seven players 1	Alfréd Hajós National Swimming Stadium, Budapest; Referees: Maro Savinović (CRO), Georgios Stavridis (GRE)

=== Final ===
2 July 2022; 20:00	Report	United States	9–7	Hungary	Alfréd Hajós National Swimming Stadium, Budapest; Referees: Boris Margeta (SLO), Frank Ohme (GER)
2 July 2022; 20:00	Report	Score by quarters: 2–1, 2–2, 3–1, 2–3			Alfréd Hajós National Swimming Stadium, Budapest; Referees: Boris Margeta (SLO), Frank Ohme (GER)
2 July 2022; 20:00	Report	Musselman 5	Goals	Gurisatti 3	Alfréd Hajós National Swimming Stadium, Budapest; Referees: Boris Margeta (SLO), Frank Ohme (GER)

== Final ranking ==
Rank	Team
1st place, gold medalist(s)	United States
2nd place, silver medalist(s)	Hungary
3rd place, bronze medalist(s)	Netherlands
4	Italy
5	Spain
6	Australia
7	Greece
8	France
9	Canada
10	New Zealand
11	Kazakhstan
12	Argentina
13	South Africa
14	Brazil
15	Thailand
16	Colombia

2022 Women's Water Polo World Champions

United States
Seventh title

== Awards and statistics ==
=== Top goalscorers ===
Rank	Name	Goals	Shots	%
1	(Spain) Judith Forca	21	46	46
1	(Spain) Beatriz Ortiz	21	44	48
3	(United States) Maddie Musselman	20	28	71
4	(Hungary) Rita Keszthelyi	18	46	39
4	(Netherlands) Simone van de Kraats	18	35	51
4	(United States) Stephania Haralabidis	18	27	67
7	(Hungary) Gréta Gurisatti	17	38	45
7	(Italy) Sofia Giustini	17	32	53
7	(Netherlands) Lola Moolhuijzen	17	30	57
7	(Spain) Elena Ruiz	17	41	41

=== Awards ===
The awards were announced on 2 July 2022.

Position	Player
Goalkeeper	(United States) Ashleigh Johnson
Field player	(Australia) Bronte Halligan
Field player	(Hungary) Rita Keszthelyi
Field player	(Netherlands) Lola Moohuijzen
Field player	(Spain) Judith Forca
Field player	(Spain) Beatriz Ortiz
Field player	(United States) Maddie Musselman
Most Valuable Goalkeeper	(United States) Ashleigh Johnson
Most Valuable Player in Final	(United States) Maddie Musselman
