= Croatia at the 2015 World Aquatics Championships =

- Flag of Croatia
- World Aquatics code: CRO
- National federation: Croatian Swimming Federation
- Website: www.croswim.org

in Kazan, Russia
- Competitors: 24 in 5 sports
- Medals Ranked 26th: Gold 0 Silver 1 Bronze 0 Total 1

World Aquatics Championships appearances
- 1994; 1998; 2001; 2003; 2005; 2007; 2009; 2011; 2013; 2015; 2017; 2019; 2022; 2023; 2024; 2025

Other related appearances
- Yugoslavia (1973–1991)

Croatia competed at the 2015 World Aquatics Championships in Kazan, Russia from 24 July to 9 August 2015.

== Medalists ==
Medal	Name	Sport	Event	Date
Silver	Croatia men's national water polo team: Marko Bijač; Luka Bukić; Damir Burić; Andro Bušlje; Maro Joković; Luka Lončar; Petar Muslim; Paulo Obradović; Josip Pavić; Fran Paškvalin; Antonio Petković; Anđelo Šetka; Sandro Sukno	Water polo	Men's tournament	August 8

== Diving ==
Croatian divers qualified for the individual spots and synchronized teams at the World Championships.

Women

Athlete	Event	Preliminaries		Semifinals		Final	
Athlete	Event	Points	Rank	Points	Rank	Points	Rank
Maja Borić	1 m springboard	195.60	35	—N/a		did not advance	
Marcela Marić	1 m springboard	183.30	36	—N/a		did not advance	
Marcela Marić	3 m springboard	228.60	38	did not advance			
Maja Borić; Marcela Marić	3 m synchronized springboard	223.89	19	—N/a		did not advance	

== Open water swimming ==
Croatia has qualified two swimmers to compete in the open water marathon.

Athlete	Event	Time	Rank
Ivan Šitić	Men's 5 km	did not start	
Ivan Šitić	Men's 10 km	2:00:05.7	59
Karla Šitić	Women's 5 km	did not start	
Karla Šitić	Women's 10 km	did not finish	

== Swimming ==
Croatian swimmers have achieved qualifying standards in the following events (up to a maximum of 2 swimmers in each event at the A-standard entry time, and 1 at the B-standard):

Men

Athlete	Event	Heat		Semifinal		Final	
Athlete	Event	Time	Rank	Time	Rank	Time	Rank
Sven Arnar Saemundsson	400 m freestyle	3:55.43	45	—N/a		did not advance	
Sven Arnar Saemundsson	800 m freestyle	8:07.40	32	—N/a		did not advance	
Sven Arnar Saemundsson	1500 m freestyle	15:53.43	39	—N/a		did not advance	
Mario Todorović	50 m freestyle	22.71	30	did not advance			
Mario Todorović	100 m freestyle	50.66	49	did not advance			
Mario Todorović	50 m butterfly	24.00	25	did not advance			

Women

Athlete	Event	Heat		Semifinal		Final	
Athlete	Event	Time	Rank	Time	Rank	Time	Rank
Sanja Jovanović	50 m backstroke	28.40	14 Q	28.39	14	did not advance	
Ana Radić	100 m breaststroke	1:10.83	41	did not advance			
Ana Radić	200 m breaststroke	2:29.71	28	did not advance			
Ana Radić	200 m individual medley	2:17.04	29	did not advance			
Matea Samardžić	100 m backstroke	1:04.07	44	did not advance			
Matea Samardžić	200 m backstroke	2:14.05	26	did not advance			

== Synchronized swimming ==
Croatia has qualified two synchronized swimmers to compete in each of the following events.

Athlete	Event	Preliminaries		Final	
Athlete	Event	Points	Rank	Points	Rank
Rebecca Domika	Solo free routine	76.9667	18	did not advance	
Rebecca Domika; Mia Šestan	Duet free routine	76.0000	25	did not advance	

== Water polo ==
=== Men's tournament ===
Team roster

- Josip Pavić
- Damir Burić
- Antonio Petković
- Luka Lončar
- Maro Joković
- Luka Bukić
- Petar Muslim
- Andro Bušlje
- Sandro Sukno
- Fran Paškvalin
- Anđelo Šetka
- Paulo Obradović
- Marko Bijač

Group play

Pos	Team	Pld	W	D	L	GF	GA	GD	Pts	Qualification
1	Croatia	3	3	0	0	39	17	+22	6	Advanced to quarterfinals
2	Canada	3	2	0	1	25	20	+5	4	Advanced to playoffs
3	Brazil	3	0	1	2	24	29	−5	1	Advanced to playoffs
4	China	3	0	1	2	12	34	−22	1	

Source: SportResult.com
Rules for classification: 1) points; 2) head-to-head points; 3) head-to-head goal difference; 4) head-to-head number of goals scored; 5) goal difference.

27 July 2015; 09:30	Report	Croatia	12–7	Canada	Kazan; Attendance: 507; Referees: Radosław Koryzna (POL), German Moller (ARG)
27 July 2015; 09:30	Report	Score by quarters: 4–2, 6–2, 1–0, 1–3			Kazan; Attendance: 507; Referees: Radosław Koryzna (POL), German Moller (ARG)
27 July 2015; 09:30	Report	four players 2	Goals	Conway 3	Kazan; Attendance: 507; Referees: Radosław Koryzna (POL), German Moller (ARG)

29 July 2015; 21:30	Report	Croatia	10–9	Brazil	Kazan; Attendance: 230; Referees: Mark Koganov (AZE), Daniel Flahive (AUS)
29 July 2015; 21:30	Report	Score by quarters: 4–2, 4–2, 1–2, 1–3			Kazan; Attendance: 230; Referees: Mark Koganov (AZE), Daniel Flahive (AUS)
29 July 2015; 21:30	Report	Sukno 3	Goals	three players 2	Kazan; Attendance: 230; Referees: Mark Koganov (AZE), Daniel Flahive (AUS)

31 July 2015; 17:30	Report	Croatia	17–1	China	Kazan; Attendance: 874; Referees: Daniel Flahive (AUS), Masoud Rezvani (IRI)
31 July 2015; 17:30	Report	Score by quarters: 4–1, 5–0, 7–0, 1–0			Kazan; Attendance: 874; Referees: Daniel Flahive (AUS), Masoud Rezvani (IRI)
31 July 2015; 17:30	Report	three players 3	Goals	Zhang Chufeng 1	Kazan; Attendance: 874; Referees: Daniel Flahive (AUS), Masoud Rezvani (IRI)

Quarterfinals

4 August 2015; 17:30	Report	Croatia	10–4	Montenegro	Kazan; Attendance: 1,769; Referees: Radosław Koryzna (POL), Massimiliano Caputi (ITA)
4 August 2015; 17:30	Report	Score by quarters: 1–0, 3–0, 3–3, 3–1			Kazan; Attendance: 1,769; Referees: Radosław Koryzna (POL), Massimiliano Caputi (ITA)
4 August 2015; 17:30	Report	Muslim 3	Goals	Klikovac 3	Kazan; Attendance: 1,769; Referees: Radosław Koryzna (POL), Massimiliano Caputi (ITA)

Semifinals

6 August 2015; 20:30	Report	Croatia	10–10 (PSO)	Greece	Kazan; Attendance: 2,486; Referees: Adrian Alexandrescu (ROU), Daniel Flahive (AUS)
6 August 2015; 20:30	Report	Score by quarters: 3–1, 2–3, 3–2, 2–4 PSO: 5–3			Kazan; Attendance: 2,486; Referees: Adrian Alexandrescu (ROU), Daniel Flahive (AUS)
6 August 2015; 20:30	Report	four players 2	Goals	Vlahopoulos 3	Kazan; Attendance: 2,486; Referees: Adrian Alexandrescu (ROU), Daniel Flahive (AUS)

Final

8 August 2015; 22:00	Report	Croatia	4–11	Serbia	Kazan; Attendance: 2,575; Referees: Boris Margeta (SLO), Georgios Stavridis (GRE)
8 August 2015; 22:00	Report	Score by quarters: 2–2, 0–3, 2–2, 0–4			Kazan; Attendance: 2,575; Referees: Boris Margeta (SLO), Georgios Stavridis (GRE)
8 August 2015; 22:00	Report	Sukno 2	Goals	Prlainović 3	Kazan; Attendance: 2,575; Referees: Boris Margeta (SLO), Georgios Stavridis (GRE)
