= Croatia at the 2013 World Aquatics Championships =

- Flag of Croatia
- World Aquatics code: CRO
- National federation: Croatian Swimming Federation
- Website: www.croswim.org

in Barcelona, Spain
- Competitors: 21 in 5 sports
- Medals Ranked 28th: Gold 0 Silver 0 Bronze 1 Total 1

World Aquatics Championships appearances
- 1994; 1998; 2001; 2003; 2005; 2007; 2009; 2011; 2013; 2015; 2017; 2019; 2022; 2023; 2024; 2025

Other related appearances
- Yugoslavia (1973–1991)

Croatia competed at the 2013 World Aquatics Championships in Barcelona, Spain between 19 July and 4 August 2013.

== Medalists ==
Medal	Name	Sport	Event	Date
Bronze	Croatia men's national water polo team: Josip Pavić; Luka Lončar; Ivan Milaković; Fran Paskvalin; Maro Joković; Luka Bukić; Petar Muslim; Andro Bušlje; Sandro Sukno; Nikša Dobud; Anđelo Šetka; Paulo Obradović; Marko Bijač	Water polo	Men's tournament	3 August

== Diving ==
Croatia qualified two quota places for the following diving events:

Women

Athlete	Event	Preliminaries		Final	
Athlete	Event	Points	Rank	Points	Rank
Maja Borić; Marcela Marić	3 m synchronized springboard	227.07	19	Did not advance	

== Open water swimming ==
Croatia qualified a single quota in open water swimming:

Athlete	Event	Time	Rank
Karla Šitić	Women's 10 km	DNS	

== Swimming ==
Croatian swimmers achieved qualifying standards in the following events (up to a maximum of 2 swimmers in each event at the A-standard entry time, and 1 at the B-standard):

Men

Athlete	Event	Heat		Semifinal		Final	
Athlete	Event	Time	Rank	Time	Rank	Time	Rank
Marko Krce Rabar	200 m backstroke	2:03.50	26	Did not advance			
Fran Krznarić	200 m individual medley	2:04.51	41	Did not advance			
Mario Todorović	100 m freestyle	49.80	26	Did not advance			
Mario Todorović	50 m butterfly	23.53	16 Q	23.47	14	Did not advance	
Mario Todorović	100 m butterfly	52.92	22	Did not advance			

Women

Athlete	Event	Heat		Semifinal		Final	
Athlete	Event	Time	Rank	Time	Rank	Time	Rank
Sanja Jovanović	50 m backstroke	28.44	=13 Q	28.60	15	Did not advance	

== Synchronized swimming ==
Croatia has qualified two synchronized swimmers.

Athlete	Event	Preliminaries		Final	
Athlete	Event	Points	Rank	Points	Rank
Rebecca Domika; Tina Panić	Duet free routine	71.860	25	Did not advance	

== Water polo ==
=== Men's tournament ===
Team roster

- Josip Pavić
- Luka Lončar
- Ivan Milaković
- Fran Paskvalin
- Maro Joković
- Luka Bukić
- Petar Muslim
- Andro Bušlje
- Sandro Sukno
- Nikša Dobud
- Anđelo Šetka
- Paulo Obradović
- Marko Bijač

Group play

	Pl	W	D	L	GF	GA	GD	Pts
Croatia	3	3	0	0	41	15	+26	6
United States	3	2	0	1	31	19	+12	4
Canada	3	1	0	2	32	32	0	2
South Africa	3	0	0	3	14	52	−38	0

22 July 2013; 10:50	Report	Croatia	9–7	United States	Piscines Bernat Picornell, Barcelona; Attendance: 300; Referees: Bender (GER), Moller (ARG)
22 July 2013; 10:50	Report	Score by quarters: 1–1, 2–2, 3–1, 3–3			Piscines Bernat Picornell, Barcelona; Attendance: 300; Referees: Bender (GER), Moller (ARG)
22 July 2013; 10:50	Report	three players 2	Goals	de Trane, Mann 2	Piscines Bernat Picornell, Barcelona; Attendance: 300; Referees: Bender (GER), Moller (ARG)

24 July 2013; 10:50	Report	Croatia	13–8	Canada	Piscines Bernat Picornell, Barcelona; Attendance: 800; Referees: Koganov (AZE), Rezvani (IRN)
24 July 2013; 10:50	Report	Score by quarters: 3–0, 3–3, 4–3, 3–2			Piscines Bernat Picornell, Barcelona; Attendance: 800; Referees: Koganov (AZE), Rezvani (IRN)
24 July 2013; 10:50	Report	Muslim, Sukno 3	Goals	Constantin-Bicari 2	Piscines Bernat Picornell, Barcelona; Attendance: 800; Referees: Koganov (AZE), Rezvani (IRN)

26 July 2013; 18:50	Report	Croatia	19–0	South Africa	Piscines Bernat Picornell, Barcelona; Attendance: 800; Referees: Ni (CHN), Rezvani (IRN)
26 July 2013; 18:50	Report	Score by quarters: 3–0, 4–0, 7–0, 5–0			Piscines Bernat Picornell, Barcelona; Attendance: 800; Referees: Ni (CHN), Rezvani (IRN)
26 July 2013; 18:50	Report	Sukno 5	Goals		Piscines Bernat Picornell, Barcelona; Attendance: 800; Referees: Ni (CHN), Rezvani (IRN)

Round of 16

28 July 2013; 12:10	Report	Croatia	21–4	New Zealand	Piscines Bernat Picornell, Barcelona; Attendance: 600; Referees: Drury (USA), Melliar (RSA)
28 July 2013; 12:10	Report	Score by quarters: 6–1, 4–2, 8–0, 3–1			Piscines Bernat Picornell, Barcelona; Attendance: 600; Referees: Drury (USA), Melliar (RSA)
28 July 2013; 12:10	Report	Muslim, Sukno 5	Goals	four players 1	Piscines Bernat Picornell, Barcelona; Attendance: 600; Referees: Drury (USA), Melliar (RSA)

Quarterfinal

30 July 2013; 17:00	Report	Croatia	7–6 (OT)	Australia	Piscines Bernat Picornell, Barcelona; Attendance: 800; Referees: Borrell (ESP), Bianchi (ITA)
30 July 2013; 17:00	Report	Score by quarters: 1–1, 1–1, 0–1, 3–2 OT: 1–1, 1–0			Piscines Bernat Picornell, Barcelona; Attendance: 800; Referees: Borrell (ESP), Bianchi (ITA)
30 July 2013; 17:00	Report	Joković 2	Goals	Miller 2	Piscines Bernat Picornell, Barcelona; Attendance: 800; Referees: Borrell (ESP), Bianchi (ITA)

Semifinal

1 August 2013; 20:15	Report	Hungary	11–10	Croatia	Piscines Bernat Picornell, Barcelona; Attendance: 4,000; Referees: Flahive (AUS), Naumov (RUS)
1 August 2013; 20:15	Report	Score by quarters: 2–3, 4–2, 3–2, 2–3			Piscines Bernat Picornell, Barcelona; Attendance: 4,000; Referees: Flahive (AUS), Naumov (RUS)
1 August 2013; 20:15	Report	Vámos, Szivós 3	Goals	four players 2	Piscines Bernat Picornell, Barcelona; Attendance: 4,000; Referees: Flahive (AUS), Naumov (RUS)

Third place game

3 August 2013; 16:30	Report	Croatia	10–8	Italy	Piscines Bernat Picornell, Barcelona; Attendance: 2,500; Referees: Stavridis (GRE), Alexandrescu (ROU)
3 August 2013; 16:30	Report	Score by quarters: 4–2, 4–1, 1–2, 1–3			Piscines Bernat Picornell, Barcelona; Attendance: 2,500; Referees: Stavridis (GRE), Alexandrescu (ROU)
3 August 2013; 16:30	Report	Sukno, Joković 3	Goals	Giorgetti 3	Piscines Bernat Picornell, Barcelona; Attendance: 2,500; Referees: Stavridis (GRE), Alexandrescu (ROU)
