= Croatia at the 2017 World Aquatics Championships =

- Flag of Croatia
- World Aquatics code: CRO
- National federation: Croatian Swimming Federation
- Website: www.croswim.org

in Budapest, Hungary
- Competitors: 29 in 5 sports
- Medals Ranked 16th: Gold 1 Silver 0 Bronze 0 Total 1

World Aquatics Championships appearances
- 1994; 1998; 2001; 2003; 2005; 2007; 2009; 2011; 2013; 2015; 2017; 2019; 2022; 2023; 2024; 2025

Other related appearances
- Yugoslavia (1973–1991)

Croatia is scheduled to compete at the 2017 World Aquatics Championships in Budapest, Hungary from 14 July to 30 July.

== Medalists ==
Medal	Name	Sport	Event	Date
Gold	Croatia men's national water polo team: Marko Bijač; Marko Macan; Loren Fatović; Luka Lončar; Maro Joković; Ivan Buljubašić; Ante Vukičević; Andro Bušlje; Sandro Sukno; Ivan Krapić; Anđelo Šetka; Xavier García; Ivan Marcelić	Water polo	Men's tournament	29 July

== Diving ==
Croatia has entered 2 divers (one male and one female).

Athlete	Event	Preliminaries		Semifinals		Final	
Athlete	Event	Points	Rank	Points	Rank	Points	Rank
Juraj Melša	Men's 1 m springboard	289.30	38	—N/a		did not advance	
Marcela Marić	Women's 1 m springboard	219.70	29	—N/a		did not advance	
Marcela Marić	Women's 3 m springboard	245.35	28	did not advance			

== Open water swimming ==
Croatia has entered one open water swimmer

Athlete	Event	Time	Rank
Doris Beroš	Women's 10 km	2:11:54.4	45

== Swimming ==
Croatian swimmers have achieved qualifying standards in the following events (up to a maximum of 2 swimmers in each event at the A-standard entry time, and 1 at the B-standard):

Athlete	Event	Heat		Semifinal		Final	
Athlete	Event	Time	Rank	Time	Rank	Time	Rank
Anton Loncar	Men's 100 m backstroke	55.88	29	did not advance			
Anton Loncar	Men's 200 m backstroke	2:00.46	27	did not advance			
Nikola Obrovac	Men's 50 m breaststroke	27.61	20	did not advance			
Nikola Obrovac	Men's 100 m breaststroke	1:02.90	45	did not advance			
Mislav Sever	Men's 50 m freestyle	22.71	=38	did not advance			
Mislav Sever	Men's 100 m freestyle	49.61	34	did not advance			

== Synchronized swimming ==
Croatia's synchronized swimming team consisted of 10 athletes (10 female).

Women

Athlete	Event	Preliminaries		Final	
Athlete	Event	Points	Rank	Points	Rank
Mia Bubanko; Lara Čibenecki; Sara Jurić; Antonia Milković; Tea Mustač; Antica Nekic; Tina Panić (R); Paula Popović; Magdalena Radovčić; Iva Štrukan (R)	Team technical routine	70.7239	22	did not advance	

Legend: (R) = Reserve Athlete

== Water polo ==
Croatia qualified a men's team.

=== Men's tournament ===
Team roster

- Marko Bijač
- Marko Macan
- Loren Fatović
- Luka Lončar
- Maro Joković
- Ivan Buljubašić
- Ante Vukičević
- Andro Bušlje
- Sandro Sukno (C)
- Ivan Krapić
- Anđelo Šetka
- Xavier García
- Ivan Marcelić

Group play

Pos	Team	Pld	W	D	L	GF	GA	GD	Pts	Qualification
1	Croatia	3	3	0	0	38	21	+17	6	Quarterfinals
2	Russia	3	1	0	2	34	32	+2	2 (Note: Russia 2 Pts, +4 GD; Japan 2 Pts, +1 GD; United States 2 Pts, −5 GD)	Playoffs
3	Japan	3	1	0	2	29	38	−9	2	Playoffs
4	United States	3	1	0	2	28	38	−10	2	

Source: Sportresult
Rules for classification: 1) points; 2) head-to-head points; 3) head-to-head goal difference; 4) head-to-head number of goals scored; 5) better result against higher placed team.
Notes:

17 July 2017; 18:50	Report	United States	7–12	Croatia	Alfréd Hajós National Swimming Stadium, Budapest; Referees: Adrian Alexandrescu (ROU), Alessandro Severo (ITA)
17 July 2017; 18:50	Report	Score by quarters: 1–3, 2–4, 1–3, 3–2			Alfréd Hajós National Swimming Stadium, Budapest; Referees: Adrian Alexandrescu (ROU), Alessandro Severo (ITA)
17 July 2017; 18:50	Report	Bowen, Cupido 2	Goals	García, Lončar 4	Alfréd Hajós National Swimming Stadium, Budapest; Referees: Adrian Alexandrescu (ROU), Alessandro Severo (ITA)

19 July 2017; 13:30	Report	Russia	8–10	Croatia	Alfréd Hajós National Swimming Stadium, Budapest; Referees: Radoslaw Koryzna (POL), Frank Ohme (GER)
19 July 2017; 13:30	Report	Score by quarters: 3–1, 3–3, 1–4, 1–2			Alfréd Hajós National Swimming Stadium, Budapest; Referees: Radoslaw Koryzna (POL), Frank Ohme (GER)
19 July 2017; 13:30	Report	Lisunov 2	Goals	Joković 4	Alfréd Hajós National Swimming Stadium, Budapest; Referees: Radoslaw Koryzna (POL), Frank Ohme (GER)

21 July 2017; 13:30	Report	Japan	6–16	Croatia	Alfréd Hajós National Swimming Stadium, Budapest; Referees: Daniel Flahive (AUS), Benjamin Mercier (FRA)
21 July 2017; 13:30	Report	Score by quarters: 1–5, 3–5, 1–4, 1–2			Alfréd Hajós National Swimming Stadium, Budapest; Referees: Daniel Flahive (AUS), Benjamin Mercier (FRA)
21 July 2017; 13:30	Report	Arai 2	Goals	four players 3	Alfréd Hajós National Swimming Stadium, Budapest; Referees: Daniel Flahive (AUS), Benjamin Mercier (FRA)

Quarterfinals

25 July 2017; 22:00	Report	Croatia	12–9	Italy	Alfréd Hajós National Swimming Stadium, Budapest; Referees: Georgios Stavridis (GRE), Matan Schwartz (ISR)
25 July 2017; 22:00	Report	Score by quarters: 3–2, 2–3, 3–1, 4–3			Alfréd Hajós National Swimming Stadium, Budapest; Referees: Georgios Stavridis (GRE), Matan Schwartz (ISR)
25 July 2017; 22:00	Report	García, Sukno 4	Goals	Renzuto 3	Alfréd Hajós National Swimming Stadium, Budapest; Referees: Georgios Stavridis (GRE), Matan Schwartz (ISR)

Semifinals

27 July 2017; 22:00	Report	Serbia	11–12	Croatia	Alfréd Hajós National Swimming Stadium, Budapest; Referees: Steven Rotsart (USA), Adrian Alexandrescu (ROU)
27 July 2017; 22:00	Report	Score by quarters: 1–1, 4–4, 4–4, 2–3			Alfréd Hajós National Swimming Stadium, Budapest; Referees: Steven Rotsart (USA), Adrian Alexandrescu (ROU)
27 July 2017; 22:00	Report	Prlainović 6	Goals	Joković, Sukno 3	Alfréd Hajós National Swimming Stadium, Budapest; Referees: Steven Rotsart (USA), Adrian Alexandrescu (ROU)

Final

29 July 2017; 20:30	Report	Hungary	6–8	Croatia	Alfréd Hajós National Swimming Stadium, Budapest; Referees: Adrian Alexandrescu (ROU), Alessandro Severo (ITA)
29 July 2017; 20:30	Report	Score by quarters: 0–4, 2–0, 2–2, 2–2			Alfréd Hajós National Swimming Stadium, Budapest; Referees: Adrian Alexandrescu (ROU), Alessandro Severo (ITA)
29 July 2017; 20:30	Report	Vámos 3	Goals	Sukno 3	Alfréd Hajós National Swimming Stadium, Budapest; Referees: Adrian Alexandrescu (ROU), Alessandro Severo (ITA)
