= Croatia at the 2011 World Aquatics Championships =

- Flag of Croatia
- FINA code: CRO
- National federation: Croatian Swimming Federation
- Website: www.croswim.org
- Medals: Gold 0 Silver 0 Bronze 0 Total 0

World Aquatics Championships appearances
- 1994; 1998; 2001; 2003; 2005; 2007; 2009; 2011; 2013; 2015; 2017; 2019; 2022; 2023; 2024

Other related appearances
- Yugoslavia (1973–1991)

Croatia competed at the 2011 World Aquatics Championships in Shanghai, China.

== Medalists ==
Medal	Name	Sport	Event	Date
Bronze	Josip Pavic; Damir Buric; Miho Boskovic; Niksa Dobud; Maro Jokovic; Petar Muslim; Frano Karac; Andro Buslje; Sandro Sukno; Samir Barac; Fran Paskvalin; Paulo Obradovic; Ivan Buljubasic	Water polo	Men's Tournament	30 July

== Open water swimming ==
Men

Athlete	Event	Final	
Athlete	Event	Time	Position
Josip Soldo	Men's 10km	2:08:12.9	51
Josip Soldo	Men's 25km	DNF	
Tomislav Soldo	Men's 10km	2::12:30.2	57
Tomislav Soldo	Men's 25km	DNF	

Women

Athlete	Event	Final	
Athlete	Event	Time	Position
Karla Šitić	Women's 10km	2:02:29.6	17
Karla Šitić	Women's 25km	5:37:49.8	12

== Swimming ==
Croatia qualified 7 swimmers.

Men

Athlete	Event	Heats		Semifinals		Final	
Athlete	Event	Time	Rank	Time	Rank	Time	Rank
Mario Todorović	Men's 100m Freestyle	50.16	38	did not advance			
Mario Todorović	Men's 50m Butterfly	24.05	20	did not advance			
Mario Todorović	Men's 100m Butterfly	53.56	33	did not advance			
Dominik Straga	Men's 200m Freestyle	1:51.35	34	did not advance			
Erazmo Marsanic	Men's 800m Freestyle	8:23.53	44			did not advance	
Roko Simunic	Men's 50m Backstroke	26.07	23	did not advance			
Lovro Bilonic	Men's 100m Breaststroke	1:02.44	46	did not advance			
Niksa Roki	Men's 200m IM	2:03.89	30	did not advance			

Women

Athlete	Event	Heats		Semifinals		Final	
Athlete	Event	Time	Rank	Time	Rank	Time	Rank
Sanja Jovanovic	Women's 50m Backstroke	29.03	22	did not advance			
Sanja Jovanovic	Women's 100m Backstroke	1:02.75	31	did not advance			

== Water polo ==
=== Men ===
Team Roster

- Josip Pavic
- Damir Buric
- Miho Boskovic
- Niksa Dobud
- Maro Jokovic
- Petar Muslim
- Frano Karac
- Andro Buslje
- Sandro Sukno
- Samir Barac – Captain
- Fran Paskvalin
- Paulo Obradovic
- Ivan Buljubasic

==== Group C ====
Team	Pld	W	D	L	GF	GA	GD	Pts
Croatia	3	3	0	0	43	16	+27	6
Canada	3	2	0	1	28	25	+3	4
Japan	3	1	0	2	25	40	–15	2
Brazil	3	0	0	3	25	40	–15	0

July 18, 2011; 13:30	Report	Brazil	5–14	Croatia	Shanghai Oriental Sports Center, Shanghai; Attendance: 250; Referees: Gonzalez (PUR), Ciric (SRB)
July 18, 2011; 13:30	Report	Score by quarters: 0–5, 1–3, 3–4, 1–2			Shanghai Oriental Sports Center, Shanghai; Attendance: 250; Referees: Gonzalez (PUR), Ciric (SRB)
July 18, 2011; 13:30	Report	Crivella 2	Goals	Bošković 4	Shanghai Oriental Sports Center, Shanghai; Attendance: 250; Referees: Gonzalez (PUR), Ciric (SRB)

July 20, 2011; 10:50	Report	Canada	4–11	Croatia	Shanghai Oriental Sports Center, Shanghai; Attendance: 300; Referees: Borrell (ESP), Williams (NZL)
July 20, 2011; 10:50	Report	Score by quarters: 1–3, 3–3, 0–3, 0–2			Shanghai Oriental Sports Center, Shanghai; Attendance: 300; Referees: Borrell (ESP), Williams (NZL)
July 20, 2011; 10:50	Report	four players 1	Goals	Dobud 4	Shanghai Oriental Sports Center, Shanghai; Attendance: 300; Referees: Borrell (ESP), Williams (NZL)

July 22, 2011; 10:50	Report	Japan	7–18	Croatia	Shanghai Oriental Sports Center, Shanghai; Attendance: 500; Referees: Ni (CHN), Balfanvayev (KAZ)
July 22, 2011; 10:50	Report	Score by quarters: 1–6, 1–3, 2–4, 3–5			Shanghai Oriental Sports Center, Shanghai; Attendance: 500; Referees: Ni (CHN), Balfanvayev (KAZ)
July 22, 2011; 10:50	Report	three players 2	Goals	Joković 3	Shanghai Oriental Sports Center, Shanghai; Attendance: 500; Referees: Ni (CHN), Balfanvayev (KAZ)

==== Quarterfinals ====
July 26, 2011; 16:40	Report	Croatia	9–6	Montenegro	Shanghai Oriental Sports Center, Shanghai; Attendance: 350; Referees: Tulga (TUR), Stavridis (GRE)
July 26, 2011; 16:40	Report	Score by quarters: 2–2, 2–1, 4–0, 1–3			Shanghai Oriental Sports Center, Shanghai; Attendance: 350; Referees: Tulga (TUR), Stavridis (GRE)
July 26, 2011; 16:40	Report	Joković 4	Goals	Radović 2	Shanghai Oriental Sports Center, Shanghai; Attendance: 350; Referees: Tulga (TUR), Stavridis (GRE)

==== Semifinals ====
July 28, 2011; 21:00	Report	Croatia	8–9	Italy	Shanghai Oriental Sports Center, Shanghai; Attendance: 1,200; Referees: Borrell (ESP), Koganov (AZE)
July 28, 2011; 21:00	Report	Score by quarters: 0–1, 1–2, 3–5, 4–1			Shanghai Oriental Sports Center, Shanghai; Attendance: 1,200; Referees: Borrell (ESP), Koganov (AZE)
July 28, 2011; 21:00	Report	Bošković 3	Goals	Giorgetti 3	Shanghai Oriental Sports Center, Shanghai; Attendance: 1,200; Referees: Borrell (ESP), Koganov (AZE)

==== Bronze medal game ====
July 30, 2011; 16:00	Report	Hungary	11–12	Croatia	Shanghai Oriental Sports Center, Shanghai; Attendance: 1,200; Referees: Borrell (ESP), Stavridis (GRE)
July 30, 2011; 16:00	Report	Score by quarters: 2–5, 2–3, 5–3, 2–1			Shanghai Oriental Sports Center, Shanghai; Attendance: 1,200; Referees: Borrell (ESP), Stavridis (GRE)
July 30, 2011; 16:00	Report	Varga, Biros 3	Goals	Bošković 4	Shanghai Oriental Sports Center, Shanghai; Attendance: 1,200; Referees: Borrell (ESP), Stavridis (GRE)
