= Eszter Pécsi =

Hungarian architect, structural engineer (1898-1975)

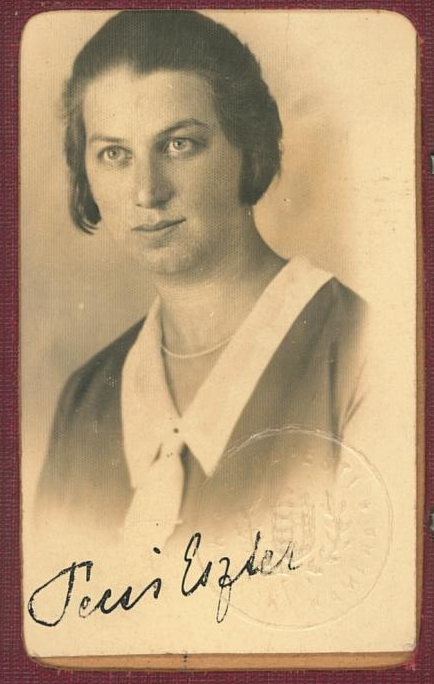
- Pécsi on her Budapest Chamber of Engineers membership card, 1931
- Born: 8 March 1898; Kecskemét
- Died: 4 May 1975 (aged 77); New York City
- Citizenship: Hungarian
- Occupation: Architect Structural engineer

Eszter Pécsi (March 8, 1898 – May 4, 1975) was the first female Hungarian architect and a structural engineer. She designed a number of iconic buildings in Hungary, Austria and America.

== Early life and education ==
Eszter Pécsi was born Eszter Pollák on March 8, 1898, in Kecskemét to Mór Pollák, a flour merchant, and Sarolta Szántó (née Schäfer). She was one of seven children and money was tight. The family changed its name to Pécsi in 1900. Two of Pécsi's sisters, Vilma and Margit, became doctors, a third, Berta, became a teacher. A brother, Illés, graduated in engineering in 1913.

Pécsi attended the Royal College of Technology in Charlottenburg, Berlin, between 1915 and 1919. In 1918, the Hungarian government passed laws enabling women to study at universities, so in 1919 Pécsi returned to Hungary to complete her education at Királyi József Műegyetem (Budapest University of Technology and Economics). She graduated on 8 March 1920, her twenty-second birthday, the first Hungarian woman to qualify as an architect. Pécsi was one of the first four women to study at the university, alongside Marianne Sternberg-Várnay, mechanical engineer Villma Máhrer and Irma Simonyi-Hajós.

== Early career ==
After graduation, Pécsi worked for a decade in the Guth and Gergely architectural engineering offices in Budapest, being promoted to senior designer after a few years at the company.

Her work during this time included designing the articulated reinforced concrete arches of the Alfréd Hajós Swimming Pool in Margitsziget. It was the first indoor swimming pool in Hungary and the largest in Europe at the time, covered by five reinforced concrete beams with a span of 31 meters and an internal height of 14 meters. The pool was the brainchild of Alfréd Hajós, a Hungarian architect and Olympic swimmer who described it as "The large hall, bridged by huge reinforced concrete arches, has an extremely impressive effect on the viewer, these arches span the wide space without any intermediate supports."

Pécsi also worked on the foundation of the central (turbine lake) turbine in Bánhida during these years.

== Marriage and partnership ==
On 3 December 1922 Pécsi married modernist architect József Fischer, and had two sons, György and János, who both grew up to become architects. The couple were both members of the Congres Internationaux d’Architecture Moderne (CIAM), which played a key role in the expansion of modernist architecture.

From 1931 to 1948 the couple ran an architectural firm together. During this period, Pécsi designed and engineered significant floating reinforced concrete slabs and tower foundations, as well as higher-than-usual steel frame structures, working as a structural engineer with many of the period's leading Hungarian architects, including Fishcher and Farkas Molnár. Her work, with original structural solutions, included the Fiumei út emergency hospital, and the Kútvölgyi út hospital, the first high-rise high-rise buildings in Budapest. She also worked on several modern houses.

During World War II, Hungary was part of the Axis powers. Pécsi's husband was conscripted into but eventually deserted the army in 1944, when Germany invaded Hungary. The couple's home was used to shelter fugitives, which endangered the family, as did Fischer's desertion.

After the war, Pécsi inspected the bomb-damaged buildings in the capital and directed the reinforcement work on the cracked roof of the National Theater.

Hungarian businesses were nationalised in 1948, and from 1949 she was an employee of the Design Office of the Ministry of Metallurgy and Mechanical Engineering (KGMTI) and then chief structural engineer. She worked on the rail manufacturer MÁVAG's forging workshop (ensuring continuous operation without any factory closures). She designed a special foundation around and above the obsolete timber-framed hall in the plant, so that old parts could be demolished. She also wrote several articles.

== Politics and the Hungarian Revolution ==
Pécsi and her husband were both members of the Magyarországi Szociáldemokrata Párt the Social Democratic Party of Hungary. Fischer was chosen as a candidate for the party in the 1939 general election, and was chairman of the architects’ group within the party. The party was suppressed under Soviet rule.

The Hungarian Revolution of 1956 was a nationwide revolution against the Hungarian People's Republic and its Soviet-imposed policies, lasting from 23 October until 10 November 1956. Pécsi became a commissioner, involved in the uprising. During the revolution, her home became a meeting place for Social Democratic politicians. Her husband József Fischer was elected to the leadership of the Social Democratic Party of Hungary when it revived during the revolution. On 3 November, Fischer was appointed as state minister in the coalition government as the party's nominee. The next day, the Soviets invaded Hungary and the revolution was crushed within a week. Fischer went into hiding for a time. In 1957, as part of the reprisals and clamp down by the Soviet authorities, Pécsi was dismissed from her job because of her involvement in the revolution.

== Life outside Hungary ==
In 1957, Pécsi left Hungary without her husband and lived in Vienna for two years, where she worked for the Krapfenbauer architectural firm and designed the structural plans for the city's first downtown multi-storey car park near the Vienna Opera House.

Her husband was dismissed from his job in 1959 and made an application to emigrate and join her, but this was denied for seven years.

Pécsi then moved to New York, where one of her sons had settled. She joined the architectural company Farkas & Barron as a structural engineer, then worked with Marcel Breuer the Hungarian architect-designer, and a leader in the Bauhaus movement. Pécsi later became a Fellow of SOM (Skidmore, Owings and Merrill), one of America's leading architectural firms, and was part of the team which drew up structural plans for the city's tallest reinforced concrete frame building at the time, the Hotel Americana, later known as the Sheraton. She also designed the structural plans for high rise buildings at Columbia University.

Her husband was finally able to join her in 1964, having had to wait over seven years for a passport to be granted.

In 1965, Pécsi was awarded the “Best Structural Engineer of the Year” award for the special foundations method she invented which allowed high-rise buildings to be built on the banks of the Hudson River.

Between 1959 and 1970 she also lectured at New York University.

In 1970 Pécsi became paralysed following due to a severe stroke. Nursed by her husband, she died on 4 May 1975 in New York City. Her ashes were taken back to Hungary and placed in Budapest's Farkasréti Cemetery.

Her granddaughter Zsuzsanna Szabóné Fischer also became a structural engineer.

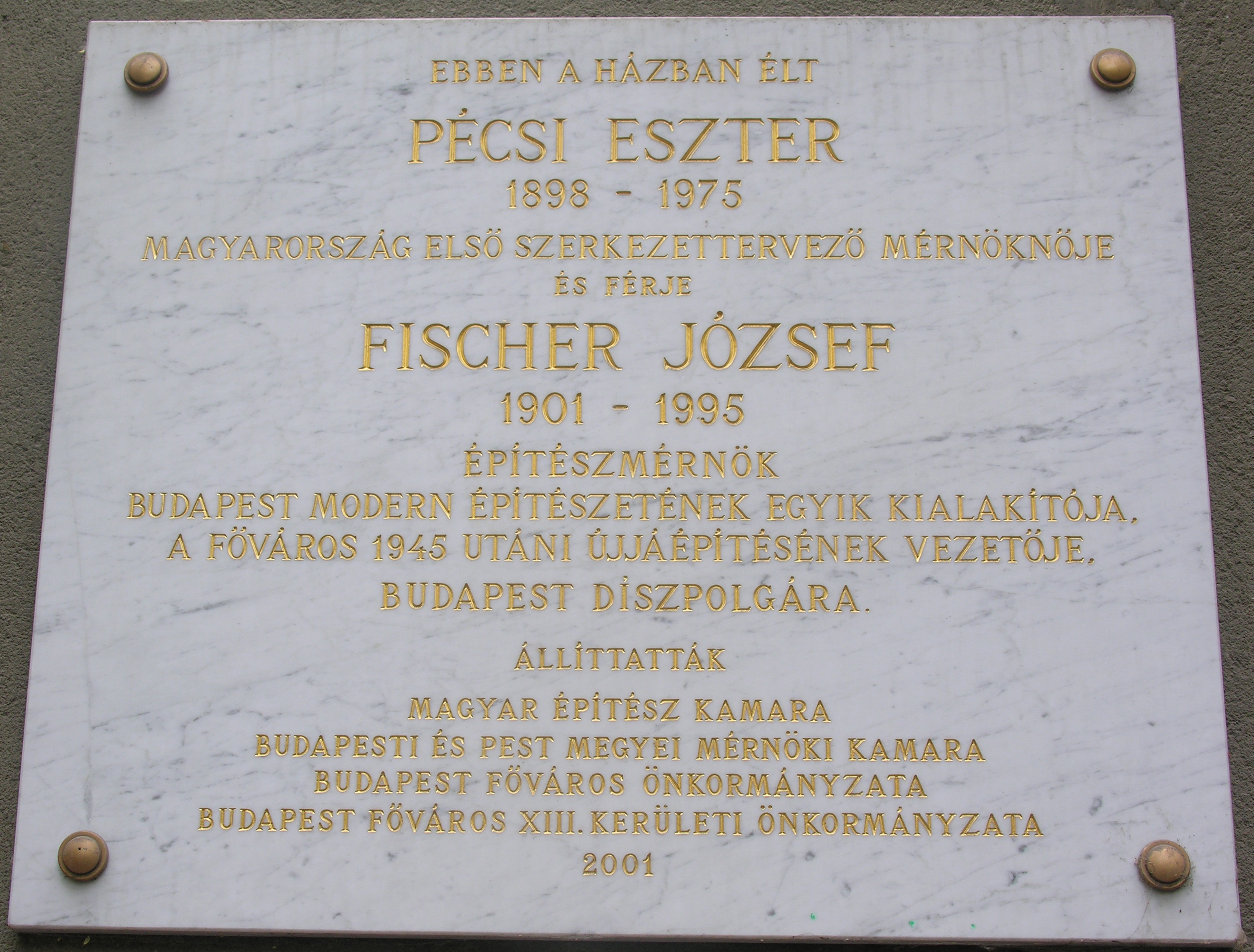
PécsiFischer SztIstvánPark16

== Commemoration ==
A plaque was placed on her birthplace in Kecskemét in 2000 and on the wall of the couple's house in Szent István Park in Budapest in 2001.

A room was named after Pécsi at the Budapest University of Technology and Economics, on the 100th anniversary of her graduation with an engineering degree.
