= Debrecen Swimming Pool Complex =

Sports venue in Hungary

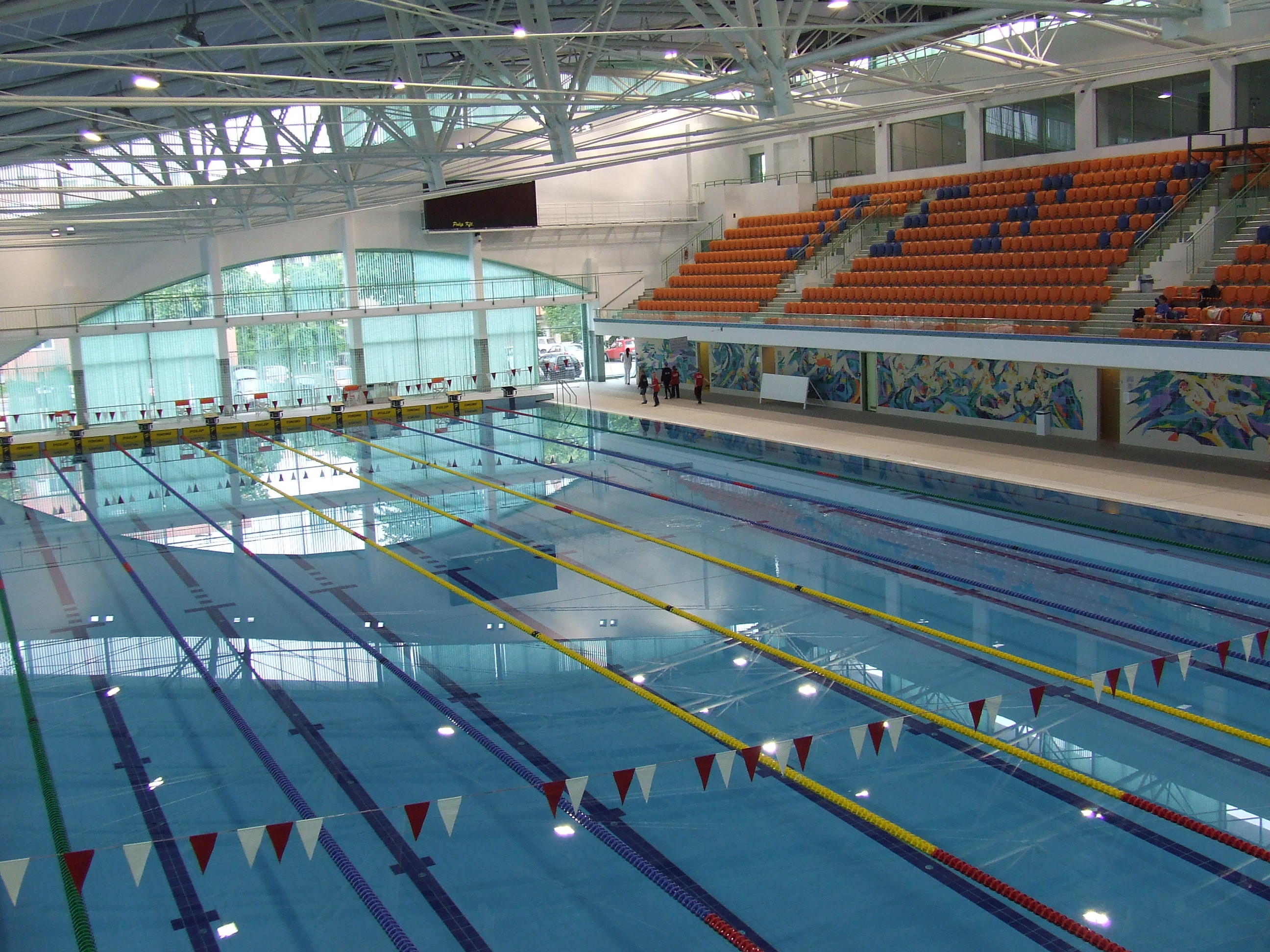
- Interactive map of Debrecen Swimming Pool Complex
- Address: Debrecen, Hungary
- Coordinates: 47°32′47″N 21°38′17″E
- Capacity: 2,000

Construction
- Built: October 2005 – September 2006
- Opened: October 2006
- Cost: €12 million

Tenant
- Debreceni Cívis Póló Vízilabda SE

The Debrecen Swimming Pool Complex is an aquatics venue in Debrecen, Hungary. The facility features a competitive long course pool, a warm up pool, a training pool, Jacuzzi, sauna and an outdoor thermal bath with a water temperature of 34–36 °C (93–97 °F). The 50 metres long course pool can be reduced to 33 metres or 25 metres by a mobile wall, making it available for short course events.

The construction of the pool began in October 2005 and took 11 months to complete. It was opened in October 2006 with a three-day-long inauguration festival, that included water polo matches and swimming competitions. The opening ceremony featured Tamás Gyárfás, president of the Hungarian Swimming Association and Lajos Kósa, mayor of Debrecen, while the ribbon-cutting ceremony was carried out by five time Olympic champion Krisztina Egerszegi.

The first major event held in the venue was the 2007 European Short Course Swimming Championships, which was followed by a number of national and international swimming and water polo competitions. In February 2012, after Antwerp withdrew from organizing the swimming events 2012 European Aquatics Championships, Debrecen stepped in as the new host and the races are now set to take place at the pool complex between 21 and 27 May 2012.

Preceded by Mäkelänrinne Swimming Center; Helsinki	European Short Course Swimming Championships; Venue; 2007	Succeeded by Kantrida Pool; Rijeka
Preceded by Alfréd Hajós National Swimming Stadium; Budapest	European Aquatics Championships; Venue; 2012; With: Pieter van den Hoogenband Swimming Stadium	Succeeded by TBA; Berlin
