= Petar Muslim =

Croatian water polo player

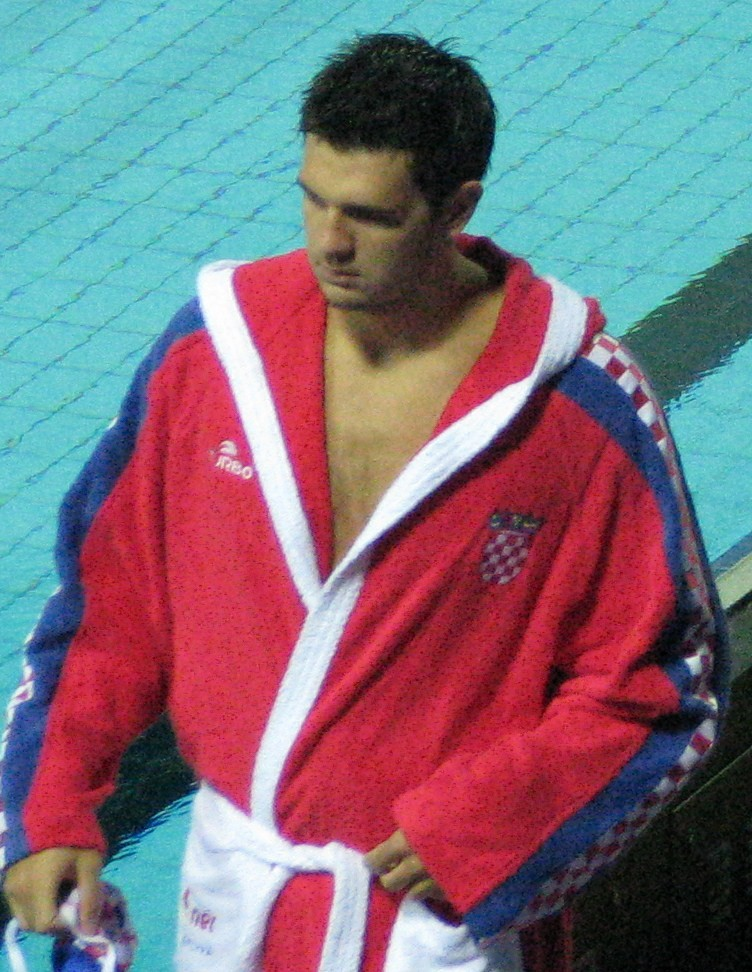

Personal information
- Born: 16 April 1988 (age 38) Split, SR Croatia, SFR Yugoslavia
- Height: 6 ft (1.8 m)
- Weight: 230 lb (104 kg)

Sport
- Sport: Water polo

Senior clubs
- Years: Team
- 2007–2011: Mladost Zagreb
- 2011–2016: Primorje Rijeka
- 2016–2019: AN Brescia
- 2019–2022: Waspo 98 Hannover
- 2022–: Primorje Rijeka
Medal record
Men's Water polo
Representing Croatia
Olympic Games
Gold medal – first place	2012 London	Team
World Championship
Silver medal – second place	2015 Kazan	Team
Bronze medal – third place	2011 Shanghai	Team
Bronze medal – third place	2013 Barcelona	Team
European Championship
Gold medal – first place	2010 Zagreb	Team
World Cup
Silver medal – second place	2010 Oradea	Team
FINA World League
Gold medal – first place	2012 Almaty	Team
Bronze medal – third place	2010 Niš	Team
Bronze medal – third place	2011 Florence	Team
Mediterranean Games
Gold medal – first place	2013 Mersin	Team

Petar Muslim (born 26 March 1988) is a Croatian water polo player who was playing for the Croatian club Primorje EB since 2022. At the 2012 Summer Olympics, he competed for the Croatia men's national water polo team in the men's event where he won gold.

== Honours ==
=== Club ===
Primorje Rijeka

- LEN Champions League runners-up: 2014–15
- Croatian Championship: 2013–14, 2014–15
- Adriatic League: 2012–13, 2013–14, 2014–15
- Croatian Cup: 2011–12, 2012–13, 2013–14, 2014–15

Mladost

- Croatian Championship: 2007–08
- Croatian Cup: 2009–10, 2010–11

== See also ==
- Croatia men's Olympic water polo team records and statistics
- List of Olympic champions in men's water polo
- List of Olympic medalists in water polo (men)
- List of World Aquatics Championships medalists in water polo
