= Andrija Bašić =

Croatian water polo player

Personal information
- Nationality: Croatian
- Born: 9 September 1995 (age 30) Šibenik, Croatia
- Height: 1.92 m (6 ft 4 in)
- Weight: 92 kg (203 lb)

Sport
- Country: Croatia
- Sport: Water polo
- Club: HAVK Mladost; NC Vouliagmeni
Medal record
European Championship
Gold medal – first place	2022 Split

Andrija Bašić (born 9 September 1995) is a Croatian water polo player. He is currently playing for German water polo club Waspo 98 Hannover. He is 6 ft 4 in (1.92 m) tall and weighs (203 lb (92 kg).
