= Ivan Krapić =

Croatian water polo player

Personal information
- Nationality: Croatian
- Born: 14 February 1989 (age 37) Rijeka, SR Croatia, SFR Yugoslavia
- Height: 1.94 m (6 ft 4 in)
- Weight: 103 kg (227 lb)

Sport
- Country: Croatia
- Sport: Water polo
Medal record
Olympic Games
Silver medal – second place	2016 Rio de Janeiro	Team
World Championship
Gold medal – first place	2017 Budapest	Team
Gold medal – first place	2024 Doha	Team
European Championship
Gold medal – first place	2022 Split

Ivan Krapić (born 14 February 1989) is a Croatian professional water polo player. He represented his country at the 2016 Summer Olympics.

== Orders ==
- Order of Danica Hrvatska with face of Franjo Bučar – 2016

== See also ==
- List of Olympic medalists in water polo (men)
- List of world champions in men's water polo
- List of World Aquatics Championships medalists in water polo
