= Luka Bukić =

Croatian water polo player

Personal information
- Born: 20 April 1994 (age 32) Zagreb, Croatia
- Height: 1.95 m (6 ft 5 in)
- Weight: 90 kg (198 lb)

Sport
- Sport: Water polo
- Club: Jadran Split
Medal record
Men's water polo
Representing Croatia
Olympic Games
Silver medal – second place	2016 Rio de Janeiro	Team
Silver medal – second place	2024 Paris	Team
World Aquatics Championships
Silver medal – second place	2015 Kazan	Team
Bronze medal – third place	2013 Barcelona	Team
European Championship
Gold medal – first place	2022 Split
Silver medal – second place	2024 Zagreb
Mediterranean Games
Gold medal – first place	2013 Mersin	Team

Luka Bukić (born 20 April 1994) is a Croatian water polo player. He was part of the Croatian team at the 2016 Summer Olympics, and the 2024 Summer Olympics, winning a silver medal each year. Bukić also competed for Croatia at the 2020 Summer Olympics, where the team finished in fifth place.

== Honours ==
Mladost

- Regional Waterpolo League: 2019–20
- Croatian Cup: 2010–11, 2011–12, 2019–20, 2020–21
- Croatian championship: 2020–21

Jadran

- Croatian Cup: 2021–22

Pro Recco

- Italia championship: 2018–19
- Italian Cup: 2018–19

== See also ==
- Croatia men's Olympic water polo team records and statistics
- List of Olympic medalists in water polo (men)
- List of World Aquatics Championships medalists in water polo
