= Alfréd Hajós National Swimming Stadium =

Swimming venue in Budapest, Hungary

Coordinates: 47°31′17″N 19°2′34″E

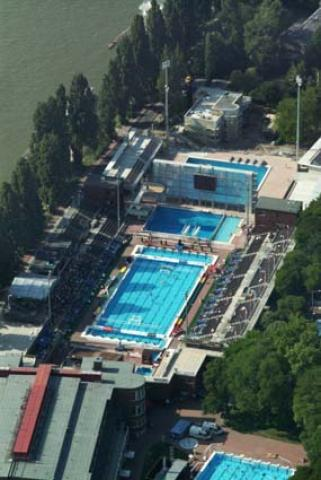
Alfréd Hajós National Swimming Stadium

The Alfréd Hajós National Swimming Stadium is an aquatics complex located on Margaret Island in Budapest, Hungary. The facility has four floors, covers an area of about 80,000 square meters and has eight indoor and outdoor pools, including training pools, diving pools and competitive swimming pools both for short course and long course.

The indoor swimming pool was built in 1930, off the plans of the renowned Hungarian swimmer and architect Alfréd Hajós, of whom the centre takes its name after. Eszter Pécsi, Hungary's first female architect and structural engineer, designed the articulated reinforced concrete arches. The outdoor swimming pool and the diving facility were completed in 1937, and since then they have expanded and improved several times.

Recently the facility was renovated before the 2006 European Championship, with an additional outdoor 50-meter pool and diving pool, named after Tamás Széchy. This brought the total number of indoor and outdoor pools up to 8 including an international standard diving platform for professional and amateur athletes.

The Hajós Alfréd National Sports Club has hosted many world competitions and regularly hosts international water polo tournaments.

The venue was the home of the European Aquatics Championships in 2006 and 2010 and the 2014 Men's European Water Polo Championship and 2014 Women's European Water Polo Championship competitions.
