= 2014–15 LEN Champions League preliminary round =

This article describes the group stage of the 2014–15 LEN Champions League.

== Format ==
12 teams were drawn into two groups of six teams, where they play each other twice. The top three teams will advance to the final six.

Key to colours in group tables
Top three placed teams advanced to the Final six

== Group A ==
Team	Pld	W	D	L	GF	GA	GD	Pts	REC	EGE	OLY	BAR	RAD	BRE
(Italy) Pro Recco	10	10	0	0	129	68	+61	30	—	11–9	17–12	17−7	19–6	8–5
(Hungary) Eger	10	5	1	4	82	79	+3	16	4–12	—	10–9	11–6	7–6	10–5
(Greece) Olympiacos	10	4	1	5	90	95	−5	13	8–12	8−6	—	7–9	13–7	8–6
(Spain) Atlètic-Barceloneta (H)	10	3	2	5	75	103	−28	11	7–15	7–7	12–8	—	9–7	7–7
(Serbia) Radnički Kragujevac	10	3	0	7	81	105	−24	9	5–12	12–11	7–8	12−7	—	13−10
(Italy) Brescia	10	2	2	6	71	78	−7	8	5–6	3−7	9–9	12–4	9–6	—

(H) Host Final Six

29 November 2014; 15:00	Brescia (Italy)	9 – 9	(Greece) Olympiacos	Piscina La Marmora, Brescia; Referees: Franulović, Raković
29 November 2014; 15:00	Presciutti 3	(2–2, 3–0, 2–3, 2–4)	Fountoulis 3	Piscina La Marmora, Brescia; Referees: Franulović, Raković
29 November 2014; 15:00		Report		Piscina La Marmora, Brescia; Referees: Franulović, Raković

29 November 2014; 20:00	Atletic-Barceloneta (Spain)	7 – 7	(Hungary) Eger	Piscinas Sant Sebastiá, Barcelona; Referees: Margeta, Stampalija
29 November 2014; 20:00	Szirányi, Espanol 2	(1–1, 1–1, 3–3, 2–2)	Vapenski 2	Piscinas Sant Sebastiá, Barcelona; Referees: Margeta, Stampalija
29 November 2014; 20:00		Report		Piscinas Sant Sebastiá, Barcelona; Referees: Margeta, Stampalija

30 November 2014; 18:00	Radnički Kragujevac (Serbia)	5 – 12	(Italy) Pro Recco	SC „Park“, Kragujevac; Referees: Stavridis, Borrell
30 November 2014; 18:00	Dedović 3	(2–2, 2–4, 0–3, 1–3)	Ivović 3	SC „Park“, Kragujevac; Referees: Stavridis, Borrell
30 November 2014; 18:00		Report		SC „Park“, Kragujevac; Referees: Stavridis, Borrell

17 December 2014; 17:00	Olympiacos (Greece)	13 – 7	(Serbia) Radnički Kragujevac	Papastrateio natatorium, Piraeus; Referees: Alexandrescu, Bianco
17 December 2014; 17:00	Fountoulis, Mourikis 3	(4–2, 2–2, 4–3, 3–0)	Vuksanović, Ćuk 3	Papastrateio natatorium, Piraeus; Referees: Alexandrescu, Bianco
17 December 2014; 17:00		Report		Papastrateio natatorium, Piraeus; Referees: Alexandrescu, Bianco

17 December 2014; 19:00	Eger (Hungary)	4 – 12	(Italy) Pro Recco	Bitskey Aladár uszoda, Eger; Referees: Birakis, Peris
17 December 2014; 19:00	Ćuk 2	(1–5, 2–2, 1–3, 0–1)	four players 2	Bitskey Aladár uszoda, Eger; Referees: Birakis, Peris
17 December 2014; 19:00		Report		Bitskey Aladár uszoda, Eger; Referees: Birakis, Peris

18 December 2014; 19:30	Atletic-Barceloneta (Spain)	7 – 7	(Italy) Brescia	Piscinas Sant Sebastiá, Barcelona; Referees: Ivanovski, Stampalija
18 December 2014; 19:30	Perrone, Roca 2	(2–2, 1–0, 2–3, 2–2)	Molina 2	Piscinas Sant Sebastiá, Barcelona; Referees: Ivanovski, Stampalija
18 December 2014; 19:30		Report		Piscinas Sant Sebastiá, Barcelona; Referees: Ivanovski, Stampalija

14 January 2015; 16:30	Radnički Kragujevac (Serbia)	12 – 7	(Spain) Atletic-Barceloneta	SC „Park“, Kragujevac; Referees: Paoletti, Schwartz
14 January 2015; 16:30	Dedović 3	(2–2, 4–4, 3–1, 3–0)	Echenique 3	SC „Park“, Kragujevac; Referees: Paoletti, Schwartz
14 January 2015; 16:30		Report		SC „Park“, Kragujevac; Referees: Paoletti, Schwartz

14 January 2015; 20:30	Brescia (Italy)	3 – 7	(Hungary) Eger	Piscina La Marmora, Brescia; Referees: Polychronopoulos, Sadekov
14 January 2015; 20:30	Molina 2	(1–1, 1–2, 0–3, 1–1)	Angyal, Ćuk 2	Piscina La Marmora, Brescia; Referees: Polychronopoulos, Sadekov
14 January 2015; 20:30		Report		Piscina La Marmora, Brescia; Referees: Polychronopoulos, Sadekov

15 January 2015; 19:00	Pro Recco (Italy)	17 – 12	(Greece) Olympiacos	Piscina Comunale, Sori; Referees: Voevodin, Vlašić
15 January 2015; 19:00	Prlainović 4	(5–3, 3–3, 6–2, 3–4)	Gounas 4	Piscina Comunale, Sori; Referees: Voevodin, Vlašić
15 January 2015; 19:00		Report		Piscina Comunale, Sori; Referees: Voevodin, Vlašić

28 January 2015; 18:45	Eger (Hungary)	10 – 9	(Greece) Olympiacos	Bitskey Aladár uszoda, Eger; Referees: Gomez, Putniković
28 January 2015; 18:45	Hosnyánszky 3	(4–3, 3–2, 3–2, 0–2)	Fountoulis 5	Bitskey Aladár uszoda, Eger; Referees: Gomez, Putniković
28 January 2015; 18:45		Report		Bitskey Aladár uszoda, Eger; Referees: Gomez, Putniković

28 January 2015; 20:30	Brescia (Italy)	9 – 6	(Serbia) Radnički Kragujevac	Piscina La Marmora, Brescia; Referees: Kun, Buch
28 January 2015; 20:30	Presciutti 5	(1–1, 3–2, 3–2, 2–1)	Dedović, Ćuk 2	Piscina La Marmora, Brescia; Referees: Kun, Buch
28 January 2015; 20:30		Report		Piscina La Marmora, Brescia; Referees: Kun, Buch

28 January 2015; 21:00	Atletic-Barceloneta (Spain)	7 – 15	(Italy) Pro Recco	Piscinas Sant Sebastiá, Barcelona; Referees: Spiegel, Koryzna
28 January 2015; 21:00	Roca, Tahull 2	(0–4, 1–3, 4–5, 2–3)	Ivović 3	Piscinas Sant Sebastiá, Barcelona; Referees: Spiegel, Koryzna
28 January 2015; 21:00		Report		Piscinas Sant Sebastiá, Barcelona; Referees: Spiegel, Koryzna

11 February 2015; 17:00	Olympiacos (Greece)	7 – 9	(Spain) Atletic-Barceloneta	Papastrateio natatorium, Piraeus; Referees: Peris, Voevodin
11 February 2015; 17:00	Vlachopoulos, Ntoskas, Mallarach 2	(1–2, 0–3, 3–3, 3–1)	Espanol 3	Papastrateio natatorium, Piraeus; Referees: Peris, Voevodin
11 February 2015; 17:00		Report		Papastrateio natatorium, Piraeus; Referees: Peris, Voevodin

11 February 2015; 18:00	Radnički Kragujevac (Serbia)	12 – 11	(Hungary) Eger	SC „Park“, Kragujevac; Referees: Stavropolous, Vasenin
11 February 2015; 18:00	Dedović, Ćuk 4	(3–3, 3–4, 5–1, 1–3)	Hosnyánszky 4	SC „Park“, Kragujevac; Referees: Stavropolous, Vasenin
11 February 2015; 18:00		Report		SC „Park“, Kragujevac; Referees: Stavropolous, Vasenin

11 February 2015; 20:30	Pro Recco (Italy)	8 – 5	(Italy) Brescia	Piscina Comunale, Sori; Referees: Koganov, Stavridis
11 February 2015; 20:30	Giacoppo, Filipović 2	(2–2, 2–1, 2–1, 2–1)	five players 1	Piscina Comunale, Sori; Referees: Koganov, Stavridis
11 February 2015; 20:30		Report		Piscina Comunale, Sori; Referees: Koganov, Stavridis

4 March 2015; 18:45	Eger (Hungary)	7 – 6	(Serbia) Radnički Kragujevac	Bitskey Aladár uszoda, Eger; Referees: Buch, Taylan
4 March 2015; 18:45	Erdélyi 2	(1–1, 1–2, 1–0, 4–3)	six players 1	Bitskey Aladár uszoda, Eger; Referees: Buch, Taylan
4 March 2015; 18:45		Report		Bitskey Aladár uszoda, Eger; Referees: Buch, Taylan

4 March 2015; 19:15	Atletic-Barceloneta (Spain)	12 – 8	(Greece) Olympiacos	Piscinas Sant Sebastiá, Barcelona; Referees: Alexandrescu, Putniković
4 March 2015; 19:15	Perrone, Espanol 3	(2–2, 3–3, 3–2, 4–1)	Vlachopoulos, Fountoulis, Ntoskas 2	Piscinas Sant Sebastiá, Barcelona; Referees: Alexandrescu, Putniković
4 March 2015; 19:15		Report		Piscinas Sant Sebastiá, Barcelona; Referees: Alexandrescu, Putniković

4 March 2015; 20:00	Brescia (Italy)	5 – 6	(Italy) Pro Recco	Piscina La Marmora, Brescia; Referees: Margeta, Naumov
4 March 2015; 20:00	five players 1	(1–2, 0–1, 3–0, 1–3)	Ivović 4	Piscina La Marmora, Brescia; Referees: Margeta, Naumov
4 March 2015; 20:00		Report		Piscina La Marmora, Brescia; Referees: Margeta, Naumov

25 March 2015; 18:00	Radnički Kragujevac (Serbia)	13 – 10	(Italy) Brescia	SC „Park“, Kragujevac; Referees: Stavridis, Bender
25 March 2015; 18:00	Dedović 4	(2–0, 2–2, 4–4, 5–4)	Rizzo 3	SC „Park“, Kragujevac; Referees: Stavridis, Bender
25 March 2015; 18:00		Report		SC „Park“, Kragujevac; Referees: Stavridis, Bender

25 March 2015; 19:00	Olympiacos (Greece)	8 – 6	(Hungary) Eger	Papastrateio natatorium, Piraeus; Referees: Margeta, Savinović
25 March 2015; 19:00	Mourikis, Mallarach 2	(2–2, 4–1, 0–1, 2–2)	Hosnyánszky 3	Papastrateio natatorium, Piraeus; Referees: Margeta, Savinović
25 March 2015; 19:00		Report		Papastrateio natatorium, Piraeus; Referees: Margeta, Savinović

25 March 2015; 20:30	Pro Recco (Italy)	17 – 7	(Spain) Atletic-Barceloneta	Piscina Comunale, Sori; Referees: Kun, Vasenin
25 March 2015; 20:30	Aicardi 3	(5–1, 6–3, 2–1, 4–2)	Fernández 3	Piscina Comunale, Sori; Referees: Kun, Vasenin
25 March 2015; 20:30		Report		Piscina Comunale, Sori; Referees: Kun, Vasenin

8 April 2015; 18:30	Eger (Hungary)	10 – 5	(Italy) Brescia	Bitskey Aladár uszoda, Eger; Referees: Ćirić, Teixido
8 April 2015; 18:30	Erdélyi 3	(3–2, 2–1, 2–1, 3–1)	five players 1	Bitskey Aladár uszoda, Eger; Referees: Ćirić, Teixido
8 April 2015; 18:30		Report		Bitskey Aladár uszoda, Eger; Referees: Ćirić, Teixido

8 April 2015; 19:00	Atletic-Barceloneta (Spain)	9 – 7	(Serbia) Radnički Kragujevac	Piscinas Sant Sebastiá, Barcelona; Referees: Margeta, Voevodin
8 April 2015; 19:00	Perrone 3	(1–3, 4–2, 2–2, 2–0)	seven players 1	Piscinas Sant Sebastiá, Barcelona; Referees: Margeta, Voevodin
8 April 2015; 19:00		Report		Piscinas Sant Sebastiá, Barcelona; Referees: Margeta, Voevodin

8 April 2015; 20:45	Olympiacos (Greece)	8 – 12	(Italy) Pro Recco	Papastrateio natatorium, Piraeus; Referees: Peris, Raković
8 April 2015; 20:45	Mallarach 4	(1–2, 4–3, 2–1, 1–6)	Aicardi, Filipović 3	Papastrateio natatorium, Piraeus; Referees: Peris, Raković
8 April 2015; 20:45		Report		Papastrateio natatorium, Piraeus; Referees: Peris, Raković

17 April 2015; 19:00	Brescia (Italy)	12 – 4	(Spain) Atletic-Barceloneta	Piscina La Marmora, Brescia; Referees: Kun, Mišković
17 April 2015; 19:00	Molina, N. Presciutti 3	(1–0, 4–2, 3–0, 4–2)	Perrone 2	Piscina La Marmora, Brescia; Referees: Kun, Mišković
17 April 2015; 19:00		Report		Piscina La Marmora, Brescia; Referees: Kun, Mišković

18 April 2015; 18:00	Radnički Kragujevac (Serbia)	7 – 8	(Greece) Olympiacos	SC „Park“, Kragujevac; Referees: Gomez, Naumov
18 April 2015; 18:00	Basara 3	(2–1, 0–2, 3–1, 2–4)	Fountoulis, Rađen 2	SC „Park“, Kragujevac; Referees: Gomez, Naumov
18 April 2015; 18:00		Report		SC „Park“, Kragujevac; Referees: Gomez, Naumov

18 April 2015; 20:30	Pro Recco (Italy)	11 – 9	(Hungary) Eger	Piscina Comunale, Sori; Referees: Schwartz, Teixido
18 April 2015; 20:30	Ivović, Prlainović 2	(4–1, 2–5, 3–3, 2–0)	Ćuk 3	Piscina Comunale, Sori; Referees: Schwartz, Teixido
18 April 2015; 20:30		Report		Piscina Comunale, Sori; Referees: Schwartz, Teixido

2 May 2015; 16:15	Eger (Hungary)	11 – 6	(Spain) Atletic-Barceloneta	Bitskey Aladár uszoda, Eger; Referees: Koganov, Rak
2 May 2015; 16:15	Szívós 4	(5–3, 0–1, 3–1, 3–1)	Espanol 3	Bitskey Aladár uszoda, Eger; Referees: Koganov, Rak
2 May 2015; 16:15		Report		Bitskey Aladár uszoda, Eger; Referees: Koganov, Rak

2 May 2015; 17:15	Olympiacos (Greece)	8 – 6	(Italy) Brescia	Papastrateio natatorium, Piraeus; Referees: Margeta, Savinović
2 May 2015; 17:15	Vlachopoulos, Mallarach 2	(2–2, 3–1, 3–2, 0–1)	Bodegas 2	Papastrateio natatorium, Piraeus; Referees: Margeta, Savinović
2 May 2015; 17:15		Report		Papastrateio natatorium, Piraeus; Referees: Margeta, Savinović

2 May 2015; 20:30	Pro Recco (Italy)	19 – 6	(Serbia) Radnički Kragujevac	Piscina Comunale, Sori
2 May 2015; 20:30	Pijetlović, Giacoppo, Lapenna 3	(5–1, 5–3, 5–1, 4–1)	Joksimović 3	Piscina Comunale, Sori
2 May 2015; 20:30		Report		Piscina Comunale, Sori

== Group B ==
Team	Pld	W	D	L	GF	GA	GD	Pts	PRI	SZO	JUG	PAR	SPA	GAL
(Croatia) Primorje	10	8	0	2	114	74	+40	24	—	9–7	10–5	14−8	11−5	16–11
(Hungary) Szolnok	10	8	0	2	122	90	+32	24	13–12	—	8−7	12–7	11–7	15–11
(Croatia) Jug	10	7	1	2	94	73	+21	22	9–6	11–9	—	13–6	12–6	11−5
(Serbia) Partizan	10	3	0	7	76	100	−24	9	7–11	7–13	3–5	—	8–6	10–7
(Germany) Spandau 04	10	2	0	8	70	109	−39	6	5–15	7–17	8–9	8–6	—	10−9
(Turkey) Galatasaray	10	1	1	8	93	123	−30	4	4–10	12–17	12–12	11–14	11–8	—

29 November 2014; 16:00	Szolnok (Hungary)	13 – 12	(Croatia) Primorje Rijeka	Tiszaligeti uszoda, Szolnok; Referees: Gomez, Voevodin
29 November 2014; 16:00	Dá. Varga 3	(3–2, 3–1, 3–5, 4–4)	Sukno, Muslim 4	Tiszaligeti uszoda, Szolnok; Referees: Gomez, Voevodin
29 November 2014; 16:00		Report		Tiszaligeti uszoda, Szolnok; Referees: Gomez, Voevodin

29 November 2014; 18:00	Spandau 04 (Germany)	8 – 9	(Croatia) Jug Dubrovnik	SSH Schöneberg, Berlin; Referees: Sadekov, Stavropulos
29 November 2014; 18:00	Faměra 3	(2–2, 3–3, 3–1, 0–3)	Dobud, Obradović 3	SSH Schöneberg, Berlin; Referees: Sadekov, Stavropulos
29 November 2014; 18:00		Report		SSH Schöneberg, Berlin; Referees: Sadekov, Stavropulos

17 January 2015; 20:00	Partizan (Serbia)	10 – 7	(Turkey) Galatasaray	SC Banjica, Belgrade; Referees: Kun, Buch
17 January 2015; 20:00	Mandić 4	(1–0, 2–4, 3–3, 4–0)	Janović 3	SC Banjica, Belgrade; Referees: Kun, Buch
17 January 2015; 20:00		Report		SC Banjica, Belgrade; Referees: Kun, Buch

17 December 2014; 19:00	Spandau 04 (Germany)	7 – 17	(Hungary) Szolnok	SSH Schöneberg, Berlin; Referees: Teixido, Toygarli
17 December 2014; 19:00	Jüngling 3	(1–4, 1–5, 3–4, 2–4)	Tóth 5	SSH Schöneberg, Berlin; Referees: Teixido, Toygarli
17 December 2014; 19:00		Report		SSH Schöneberg, Berlin; Referees: Teixido, Toygarli

17 December 2014; 20:00	Galatasaray (Turkey)	4 – 10	(Croatia) Primorje Rijeka	„Engin Bora” Havuzu, Istanbul; Referees: Koganov, Margeta
17 December 2014; 20:00	Aksentijević 2	(0–2, 1–2, 2–1, 1–5)	Radu 2	„Engin Bora” Havuzu, Istanbul; Referees: Koganov, Margeta
17 December 2014; 20:00		Report		„Engin Bora” Havuzu, Istanbul; Referees: Koganov, Margeta

17 December 2014; 20:00	Partizan (Serbia)	3 – 5	(Croatia) Jug Dubrovnik	SC Banjica, Belgrade; Referees: Severo, Schwartz
17 December 2014; 20:00	Mandić 3	(0–1, 0–2, 3–2, 0–0)	Janović 2	SC Banjica, Belgrade; Referees: Severo, Schwartz
17 December 2014; 20:00		Report		SC Banjica, Belgrade; Referees: Severo, Schwartz

14 January 2015; 18:50	Primorje Rijeka (Croatia)	11 – 5	(Germany) Spandau 04	Bazeni Kantrida, Rijeka; Referees: Fekete, Ivanovski
14 January 2015; 18:50	Radu 4	(4–1, 4–1, 1–1, 2–2)	Restović 3	Bazeni Kantrida, Rijeka; Referees: Fekete, Ivanovski
14 January 2015; 18:50		Report		Bazeni Kantrida, Rijeka; Referees: Fekete, Ivanovski

14 January 2015; 19:00	Jug Dubrovnik (Croatia)	11 – 5	(Turkey) Galatasaray	Bazen u Gružu, Dubrovnik; Referees: Gomez, Häntschel
14 January 2015; 19:00	Janović 4	(4–1, 2–0, 2–2, 3–2)	Vukčević 2	Bazen u Gružu, Dubrovnik; Referees: Gomez, Häntschel
14 January 2015; 19:00		Report		Bazen u Gružu, Dubrovnik; Referees: Gomez, Häntschel

14 January 2015; 19:00	Szolnok (Hungary)	12 – 7	(Serbia) Partizan	Tiszaligeti uszoda, Szolnok; Referees: Galindo, Margeta
14 January 2015; 19:00	Aleksić 5	(3–1, 2–2, 3–2, 4–2)	Mandić 4	Tiszaligeti uszoda, Szolnok; Referees: Galindo, Margeta
14 January 2015; 19:00		Report		Tiszaligeti uszoda, Szolnok; Referees: Galindo, Margeta

28 January 2015; 17:30	Partizan (Serbia)	7 – 11	(Croatia) Primorje Rijeka	SC Banjica, Belgrade; Referees: Teixido, Naumov
28 January 2015; 17:30	Subotić 3	(2–3, 2–2, 2–3, 1–3)	Sukno 3	SC Banjica, Belgrade; Referees: Teixido, Naumov
28 January 2015; 17:30		Report		SC Banjica, Belgrade; Referees: Teixido, Naumov

28 January 2015; 19:00	Jug Dubrovnik (Croatia)	11 – 9	(Hungary) Szolnok	Bazen u Gružu, Dubrovnik; Referees: Koganov, Margeta
28 January 2015; 19:00	Janović, Obradović 3	(4–3, 1–2, 4–1, 2–3)	Mitrović 4	Bazen u Gružu, Dubrovnik; Referees: Koganov, Margeta
28 January 2015; 19:00		Report		Bazen u Gružu, Dubrovnik; Referees: Koganov, Margeta

28 January 2015; 20:00	Galatasaray (Turkey)	11 – 8	(Germany) Spandau 04	„Engin Bora” Havuzu, Istanbul; Referees: Rovida, Franulović
28 January 2015; 20:00	Vukčević 4	(2–2, 1–1, 5–2, 3–3)	Ćuk, Jüngling 2	„Engin Bora” Havuzu, Istanbul; Referees: Rovida, Franulović
28 January 2015; 20:00		Report		„Engin Bora” Havuzu, Istanbul; Referees: Rovida, Franulović

11 February 2015; 18:50	Primorje Rijeka (Croatia)	10 – 5	(Croatia) Jug Dubrovnik	Bazeni Kantrida, Rijeka; Referees: Gomez, Vogel
11 February 2015; 18:50	Sukno 3	(5–1, 3–2, 1–1, 1–1)	five players 1	Bazeni Kantrida, Rijeka; Referees: Gomez, Vogel
11 February 2015; 18:50		Report		Bazeni Kantrida, Rijeka; Referees: Gomez, Vogel

11 February 2015; 19:00	Spandau 04 (Germany)	8 – 6	(Serbia) Partizan	SSH Schöneberg, Berlin; Referees: Koryzna, Severo
11 February 2015; 19:00	Ćuk 4	(1–2, 3–1, 2–2, 2–1)	Stojanović 2	SSH Schöneberg, Berlin; Referees: Koryzna, Severo
11 February 2015; 19:00		Report		SSH Schöneberg, Berlin; Referees: Koryzna, Severo

11 February 2015; 19:00	Szolnok (Hungary)	15 – 11	(Turkey) Galatasaray	Tiszaligeti uszoda, Szolnok; Referees: Rasković, Alexandrescu
11 February 2015; 19:00	Mitrović 5	(3–2, 3–5, 7–1, 2–3)	Pasković 4	Tiszaligeti uszoda, Szolnok; Referees: Rasković, Alexandrescu
11 February 2015; 19:00		Report		Tiszaligeti uszoda, Szolnok; Referees: Rasković, Alexandrescu

4 March 2015; 18:00	Partizan (Serbia)	8 – 6	(Germany) Spandau 04	SC Banjica, Belgrade; Referees: Moiralis, Collantoni
4 March 2015; 18:00	Mandić, Subotić, Stojanović 2	(2–2, 2–1, 3–0, 1–3)	Miers 2	SC Banjica, Belgrade; Referees: Moiralis, Collantoni
4 March 2015; 18:00		Report		SC Banjica, Belgrade; Referees: Moiralis, Collantoni

4 March 2015; 19:00	Jug Dubrovnik (Croatia)	9 – 6	(Croatia) Primorje Rijeka	Bazen u Gružu, Dubrovnik; Referees: Stavropulos, Severo
4 March 2015; 19:00	Bošković, Janović 3	(2–3, 2–0, 3–1, 2–2)	Radu, Sukno 2	Bazen u Gružu, Dubrovnik; Referees: Stavropulos, Severo
4 March 2015; 19:00		Report		Bazen u Gružu, Dubrovnik; Referees: Stavropulos, Severo

4 March 2015; 20:00	Galatasaray (Turkey)	12 – 17	(Hungary) Szolnok	„Engin Bora” Havuzu, Istanbul; Referees: Abramović, Teixido
4 March 2015; 20:00	Janović, Nikić 3	(2–5, 4–5, 3–2, 3–5)	Dé. Varga, Mitrović 5	„Engin Bora” Havuzu, Istanbul; Referees: Abramović, Teixido
4 March 2015; 20:00		Report		„Engin Bora” Havuzu, Istanbul; Referees: Abramović, Teixido

25 March 2015; 18:50	Primorje Rijeka (Croatia)	14 – 8	(Serbia) Partizan	Bazeni Kantrida, Rijeka; Referees: Birakis, Koryzna
25 March 2015; 18:50	Sukno 3	(0–0, 3–2, 7–5, 4–1)	eight players 1	Bazeni Kantrida, Rijeka; Referees: Birakis, Koryzna
25 March 2015; 18:50		Report		Bazeni Kantrida, Rijeka; Referees: Birakis, Koryzna

25 March 2015; 19:00	Spandau 04 (Germany)	10 – 9	(Turkey) Galatasaray	SSH Schöneberg, Berlin; Referees: Ivanovski, Colombo
25 March 2015; 19:00	Restović 4	(2–1, 3–3, 3–3, 2–2)	Kljajević, Pasković 3	SSH Schöneberg, Berlin; Referees: Ivanovski, Colombo
25 March 2015; 19:00		Report		SSH Schöneberg, Berlin; Referees: Ivanovski, Colombo

25 March 2015; 19:00	Szolnok (Hungary)	8 – 7	(Croatia) Jug Dubrovnik	Tiszaligeti uszoda, Szolnok; Referees: Alexandrescu, Gomez
25 March 2015; 19:00	Vámos, Aleksić, Dé. Varga 2	(3–0, 1–2, 2–2, 2–3)	Bošković, Janović 2	Tiszaligeti uszoda, Szolnok; Referees: Alexandrescu, Gomez
25 March 2015; 19:00		Report		Tiszaligeti uszoda, Szolnok; Referees: Alexandrescu, Gomez

8 April 2015; 18:00	Partizan (Serbia)	7 – 13	(Hungary) Szolnok	SC Banjica, Belgrade; Referees: Buch, Spiegel
8 April 2015; 18:00	Mandić, Jakšić 3	(4–2, 1–5, 2–3, 0–3)	Dé. Varga 5	SC Banjica, Belgrade; Referees: Buch, Spiegel
8 April 2015; 18:00		Report		SC Banjica, Belgrade; Referees: Buch, Spiegel

8 April 2015; 19:00	Spandau 04 (Germany)	5 – 15	(Croatia) Primorje Rijeka	SSH Schöneberg, Berlin; Referees: Schwartz, Vogel
8 April 2015; 19:00	five players 1	(1–5, 3–4, 0–4, 1–2)	Radu 4	SSH Schöneberg, Berlin; Referees: Schwartz, Vogel
8 April 2015; 19:00		Report		SSH Schöneberg, Berlin; Referees: Schwartz, Vogel

8 April 2015; 20:00	Galatasaray (Turkey)	12 – 12	(Croatia) Jug Dubrovnik	„Engin Bora” Havuzu, Istanbul; Referees: Boudramis,
8 April 2015; 20:00	Pasković, Vukčević 3	(2–3, 5–3, 2–2, 3–4)	Ivanković 3	„Engin Bora” Havuzu, Istanbul; Referees: Boudramis,
8 April 2015; 20:00		Report		„Engin Bora” Havuzu, Istanbul; Referees: Boudramis,

18 April 2015; 17:15	Primorje Rijeka (Croatia)	16 – 11	(Turkey) Galatasaray	Bazeni Kantrida, Rijeka; Referees: Colombo, Kyranis
18 April 2015; 17:15	Burić 4	(2–2, 6–1, 3–1, 5–7)	Pasković 4	Bazeni Kantrida, Rijeka; Referees: Colombo, Kyranis
18 April 2015; 17:15		Report		Bazeni Kantrida, Rijeka; Referees: Colombo, Kyranis

18 April 2015; 18:00	Szolnok (Hungary)	11 – 7	(Germany) Spandau 04	Tiszaligeti uszoda, Szolnok; Referees: Radičević, Matache
18 April 2015; 18:00	Mitrović 4	(3–1, 3–2, 4–3, 1–1)	Jüngling, Gottfried 2	Tiszaligeti uszoda, Szolnok; Referees: Radičević, Matache
18 April 2015; 18:00		Report		Tiszaligeti uszoda, Szolnok; Referees: Radičević, Matache

18 April 2015; 19:00	Jug Dubrovnik (Croatia)	13 – 6	(Serbia) Partizan	Bazen u Gružu, Dubrovnik; Referees: Mercier, Achladiotis
18 April 2015; 19:00	Bošković 3	(2–1, 4–1, 2–3, 5–1)	Subotić 3	Bazen u Gružu, Dubrovnik; Referees: Mercier, Achladiotis
18 April 2015; 19:00		Report		Bazen u Gružu, Dubrovnik; Referees: Mercier, Achladiotis

2 May 2015; 17:00	Jug Dubrovnik (Croatia)	12 – 6	(Germany) Spandau 04	Bazen u Gružu, Dubrovnik; Referees: Taylan, Gomez
2 May 2015; 17:00	Bošković 3	(3–1, 3–2, 2–2, 4–1)	Restović 3	Bazen u Gružu, Dubrovnik; Referees: Taylan, Gomez
2 May 2015; 17:00		Report		Bazen u Gružu, Dubrovnik; Referees: Taylan, Gomez

2 May 2015; 18:05	Primorje Rijeka (Croatia)	9 – 7	(Hungary) Szolnok	Bazeni Kantrida, Rijeka; Referees: Alexandrescu, Stavridis
2 May 2015; 18:05	Radu 3	(1–3, 2–0, 2–2, 4–2)	seven players 1	Bazeni Kantrida, Rijeka; Referees: Alexandrescu, Stavridis
2 May 2015; 18:05		Report		Bazeni Kantrida, Rijeka; Referees: Alexandrescu, Stavridis

2 May 2015; 20:00	Galatasaray (Turkey)	11 – 14	(Serbia) Partizan	„Engin Bora” Havuzu, Istanbul; Referees: Bianco, Inesta
2 May 2015; 20:00	Pasković 3	(1–4, 4–3, 3–2, 3–5)	Mandić 3	„Engin Bora” Havuzu, Istanbul; Referees: Bianco, Inesta
2 May 2015; 20:00		Report		„Engin Bora” Havuzu, Istanbul; Referees: Bianco, Inesta
