= 2024 Men's European Water Polo Championship =

Tournament details
- Host country: Croatia
- Venues: 2 (in 2 host cities)
- Dates: 4–16 January
- Teams: 16 (from 1 confederation)

Final positions
- Champions: Spain (1st title)
- Runners-up: Croatia
- Third place: Italy
- Fourth place: Hungary

Tournament statistics
- Matches played: 48
- Goals scored: 1,067 (22.23 per match)
- Top scorers: (Croatia) Nikolay Bonev (25 goals)

Awards
- Best player: (Croatia) Nikolay Bonev
- Best goalkeeper: (Croatia) Marko Bijač

The 2024 Men's European Water Polo Championship was the 36th edition of the tournament, held in Dubrovnik and Zagreb, Croatia from 4 to 16 January 2024. Originally, Israel had been selected as host and the competition was slated to be held in Netanya, from 3 to 16 January 2024. Due to security concerns after the breakout of the Gaza war, LEN announced the Championship would be hosted elsewhere.

== Host selection ==
The championship was originally going to be held in Tel Aviv, Israel between 7 and 21 October 2023 (although it would still be called the 2024 European Championship). But on 31 March 2023, it was moved to the Israeli city of Netanya and rescheduled for 3 to 16 January 2024 at the Wingate Institute Olympic swimming pool. This decision was made to reduce the travel costs for the participating teams and make sure there was only one stoppage during the season instead of two (due to the 2024 World Aquatics Championships being held in February 2024).

However, after the Gaza war broke out, LEN said they would monitor the situation on 12 October. But on 2 November, LEN announced that the tournament would not be hosted in Israel.

After that announcement, Budapest, Belgrade, Berlin, Romania (city not known) and Zagreb had been reported as possibly interested in hosting the championships Croatia was announced as the host on 17 November, with Dubrovnik and Zagreb as venues. Croatia became the first country to host the men's championships twice in a row.

== Format ==
This was the first edition with teams sorted into two Divisions, based on the last edition and the qualifiers. The top eight teams made Division 1 and the other eight teams Division 2. Both divisions were split into two groups of four teams. The top two teams from each group of Division 1 advanced directly to the quarterfinals, while the other two teams from each group played against one of the top two sides from each group in Division 2 in a play-off round. Starting with quarterfinals onward, the regular knock-out system was used.

== Qualification ==
Sixteen teams competed at the main event.

- The host nation
- The top eight teams from the 2022 European Championship not already qualified as host nation
- Final seven from the qualifiers.

All sixteen teams from 2022 qualified again.

As of 2026, this is the last time Germany qualified for the European championship and last time Turkey failed to qualify.

Event	Date	Location	Quotas	Nation(s)
Host	13 May 2022	–	1	Israel
2022 European Championship	29 August – 10 September	(Croatia) Split	8	Croatia; Hungary; Spain; Italy; Greece; France; Montenegro; Georgia
Qualifiers	23–25 June 2023	Various	7	Netherlands; Germany; Serbia; Romania; Slovenia; Malta; Slovakia

== Venues ==
This tournament marked the first time that the championships was held in more than one venue, with Dubrovnik and Zagreb hosting games. The latter hosted the games from the quarter finals onwards.

Dubrovnik	Zagreb	2024 Men's European Water Polo Championship is located in Croatia
Bazen u Gružu; Capacity: 2,500	Bazen Mladost; Capacity: 2,000	2024 Men's European Water Polo Championship is located in Croatia

== Draw ==
The draw was held on 12 September 2023 in Netanya, Israel.

Division 1

The pots for Division 1 were decided by the rankings of the 2022 European Championship

Pot 1	Pot 2	Pot 3	Pot 4
Croatia; Hungary	Spain; Italy	Greece; France	Montenegro; Georgia

Division 2

The seeding for Division 2 was decided by who finished first and second in the qualifiers (excluding Israel).

Pot 1	Pot 2
Netherlands; Germany; Serbia; Romania	Israel; Malta; Slovakia; Slovenia

== Preliminary round ==
The schedule was announced on 24 November 2023.

All times are local (UTC+1).

=== Division 1 ===
==== Group A ====
Pos	Team	Pld	W	PSW	PSL	L	GF	GA	GD	Pts	Qualification
1	Spain	3	2	0	1	0	32	27	+5	7	Quarterfinals
2	Croatia (H)	3	1	1	1	0	32	27	+5	6	Quarterfinals
3	Montenegro	3	0	2	0	1	33	35	−2	4	Playoffs
4	France	3	0	0	1	2	23	31	−8	1	Playoffs

Source: LEN
Rules for classification: 1) points; 2) head-to-head points; 3) head-to-head goal difference; 4) head-to-head number of goals scored; 5) Goal difference.
(H) Host

4 January 2024; 17:00	Report	Montenegro	20–19 (PSO)	France	Bazen u Gružu, Dubrovnik; Referees: Georgios Stavridis (GRE), Raffaele Colombo (ITA)
4 January 2024; 17:00	Report	Score by quarters: 2–4, 2–1, 3–2, 3–3 PSO: 10–9			Bazen u Gružu, Dubrovnik; Referees: Georgios Stavridis (GRE), Raffaele Colombo (ITA)
4 January 2024; 17:00	Report	Matković 3	Goals	Vernoux 4	Bazen u Gružu, Dubrovnik; Referees: Georgios Stavridis (GRE), Raffaele Colombo (ITA)

4 January 2024; 20:15	Report	Spain	12–14 (PSO)	Croatia	Bazen u Gružu, Dubrovnik; Referees: Vojin Putniković (SRB), Tamás Kovács Csatlós (HUN)
4 January 2024; 20:15	Report	Score by quarters: 1–2, 5–2, 2–2, 1–3 PSO: 3–5			Bazen u Gružu, Dubrovnik; Referees: Vojin Putniković (SRB), Tamás Kovács Csatlós (HUN)
4 January 2024; 20:15	Report	four players 2	Goals	Bukić, Fatović 2	Bazen u Gružu, Dubrovnik; Referees: Vojin Putniković (SRB), Tamás Kovács Csatlós (HUN)

6 January 2024; 17:45	Report	Montenegro	12–14	Spain	Bazen u Gružu, Dubrovnik; Referees: Tamás Kovács Csatlós (HUN), Raffaele Colombo (ITA)
6 January 2024; 17:45	Report	Score by quarters: 2–4, 4–4, 3–2, 3–4			Bazen u Gružu, Dubrovnik; Referees: Tamás Kovács Csatlós (HUN), Raffaele Colombo (ITA)
6 January 2024; 17:45	Report	three players 3	Goals	Granados 5	Bazen u Gružu, Dubrovnik; Referees: Tamás Kovács Csatlós (HUN), Raffaele Colombo (ITA)

6 January 2024; 20:15	Report	Croatia	12–7	France	Bazen u Gružu, Dubrovnik; Referees: Georgios Stavridis (GRE), Vojin Putniković (SRB)
6 January 2024; 20:15	Report	Score by quarters: 3–1, 3–1, 4–3, 2–2			Bazen u Gružu, Dubrovnik; Referees: Georgios Stavridis (GRE), Vojin Putniković (SRB)
6 January 2024; 20:15	Report	Burić 3	Goals	Vernoux 3	Bazen u Gružu, Dubrovnik; Referees: Georgios Stavridis (GRE), Vojin Putniković (SRB)

8 January 2024; 17:45	Report	Spain	9–6	France	Bazen u Gružu, Dubrovnik; Referees: Raffaele Colombo (ITA), Vojin Putniković (SRB)
8 January 2024; 17:45	Report	Score by quarters: 1–1, 3–2, 3–1, 2–2			Bazen u Gružu, Dubrovnik; Referees: Raffaele Colombo (ITA), Vojin Putniković (SRB)
8 January 2024; 17:45	Report	Granados, Perrone 3	Goals	Crousillat 2	Bazen u Gružu, Dubrovnik; Referees: Raffaele Colombo (ITA), Vojin Putniković (SRB)

8 January 2024; 20:15	Report	Montenegro	15–13 (PSO)	Croatia	Bazen u Gružu, Dubrovnik; Referees: Georgios Stavridis (GRE), Tamás Kovács Csatlós (HUN)
8 January 2024; 20:15	Report	Score by quarters: 2–4, 3–1, 3–4, 3–2 PSO: 4–2			Bazen u Gružu, Dubrovnik; Referees: Georgios Stavridis (GRE), Tamás Kovács Csatlós (HUN)
8 January 2024; 20:15	Report	Đ. Radović 3	Goals	Marinić Kragić, Žuvela 3	Bazen u Gružu, Dubrovnik; Referees: Georgios Stavridis (GRE), Tamás Kovács Csatlós (HUN)

==== Group B ====
Pos	Team	Pld	W	PSW	PSL	L	GF	GA	GD	Pts	Qualification
1	Hungary	3	2	0	0	1	33	26	+7	6 (Note: Hungary 3 Pts, +3 GD; Italy 3 Pts, +2 GD; Greece 3 Pts, −5 GD)	Quarterfinals
2	Italy	3	2	0	0	1	42	23	+19	6	Quarterfinals
3	Greece	3	2	0	0	1	36	32	+4	6	Playoffs
4	Georgia	3	0	0	0	3	25	55	−30	0	Playoffs

Source: LEN
Rules for classification: 1) points; 2) head-to-head points; 3) head-to-head goal difference; 4) head-to-head number of goals scored; 5) Goal difference.
Notes:

4 January 2024; 17:00	Report	Georgia	5–22	Italy	Bazen Mladost, Zagreb; Referees: Tomislav Copić (CRO), Peter Radič (SVK)
4 January 2024; 17:00	Report	Score by quarters: 0–5, 2–6, 0–6, 3–5			Bazen Mladost, Zagreb; Referees: Tomislav Copić (CRO), Peter Radič (SVK)
4 January 2024; 17:00	Report	Pjesivac 2	Goals	Di Fulvio, Fondelli 5	Bazen Mladost, Zagreb; Referees: Tomislav Copić (CRO), Peter Radič (SVK)

4 January 2024; 19:00	Report	Hungary	8–10	Greece	Bazen Mladost, Zagreb; Referees: Adrian-Tiberiu Alexandrescu (ROU), Julien Bourges (FRA)
4 January 2024; 19:00	Report	Score by quarters: 1–2, 2–3, 3–2, 2–3			Bazen Mladost, Zagreb; Referees: Adrian-Tiberiu Alexandrescu (ROU), Julien Bourges (FRA)
4 January 2024; 19:00	Report	Fekete 3	Goals	four players 2	Bazen Mladost, Zagreb; Referees: Adrian-Tiberiu Alexandrescu (ROU), Julien Bourges (FRA)

6 January 2024; 17:00	Report	Georgia	11–15	Hungary	Bazen Mladost, Zagreb; Referees: Siniša Matijašević (MNE), Tomislav Copić (CRO)
6 January 2024; 17:00	Report	Score by quarters: 2–5, 3–4, 6–4, 0–2			Bazen Mladost, Zagreb; Referees: Siniša Matijašević (MNE), Tomislav Copić (CRO)
6 January 2024; 17:00	Report	Akhvlediani 3	Goals	Nagy 4	Bazen Mladost, Zagreb; Referees: Siniša Matijašević (MNE), Tomislav Copić (CRO)

6 January 2024; 19:00	Report	Greece	8–15	Italy	Bazen Mladost, Zagreb; Referees: Adrian-Tiberiu Alexandrescu (ROU), Pau Segurana Ferré (ESP)
6 January 2024; 19:00	Report	Score by quarters: 2–4, 2–3, 2–5, 2–3			Bazen Mladost, Zagreb; Referees: Adrian-Tiberiu Alexandrescu (ROU), Pau Segurana Ferré (ESP)
6 January 2024; 19:00	Report	Vlachopoulos 3	Goals	Di Somma 5	Bazen Mladost, Zagreb; Referees: Adrian-Tiberiu Alexandrescu (ROU), Pau Segurana Ferré (ESP)

8 January 2024; 17:00	Report	Georgia	9–18	Greece	Bazen Mladost, Zagreb; Referees: Siniša Matijašević (MNE), Ruben Garcia (SUI)
8 January 2024; 17:00	Report	Score by quarters: 2–5, 3–6, 3–3, 1–4			Bazen Mladost, Zagreb; Referees: Siniša Matijašević (MNE), Ruben Garcia (SUI)
8 January 2024; 17:00	Report	Jelaca 6	Goals	three players 3	Bazen Mladost, Zagreb; Referees: Siniša Matijašević (MNE), Ruben Garcia (SUI)

8 January 2024; 19:00	Report	Hungary	10–5	Italy	Bazen Mladost, Zagreb; Referees: Boris Margeta (SLO), Pau Segurana Ferré (ESP)
8 January 2024; 19:00	Report	Score by quarters: 0–1, 3–0, 4–3, 3–1			Bazen Mladost, Zagreb; Referees: Boris Margeta (SLO), Pau Segurana Ferré (ESP)
8 January 2024; 19:00	Report	Fekete 3	Goals	five players 1	Bazen Mladost, Zagreb; Referees: Boris Margeta (SLO), Pau Segurana Ferré (ESP)

=== Division 2 ===
==== Group C ====
Pos	Team	Pld	W	PSW	PSL	L	GF	GA	GD	Pts	Qualification
1	Serbia	3	3	0	0	0	57	11	+46	9	Playoffs
2	Germany	3	2	0	0	1	38	35	+3	6	Playoffs
3	Malta	3	1	0	0	2	30	50	−20	3	Classification round
4	Israel	3	0	0	0	3	20	49	−29	0	Classification round

Source: LEN
Rules for classification: 1) points; 2) head-to-head points; 3) head-to-head goal difference; 4) head-to-head number of goals scored; 5) Goal difference.

5 January 2024; 17:00	Report	Serbia	22–1	Israel	Bazen Mladost, Zagreb; Referees: Pau Segurana Ferré (ESP), Ruben Garcia (SUI)
5 January 2024; 17:00	Report	Score by quarters: 6–0, 5–0, 5–1, 6–0			Bazen Mladost, Zagreb; Referees: Pau Segurana Ferré (ESP), Ruben Garcia (SUI)
5 January 2024; 17:00	Report	Radulović 4	Goals	Gros 1	Bazen Mladost, Zagreb; Referees: Pau Segurana Ferré (ESP), Ruben Garcia (SUI)

5 January 2024; 19:00	Report	Germany	18–13	Malta	Bazen Mladost, Zagreb; Referees: Siniša Matijašević (MNE), Rik Evers (NED)
5 January 2024; 19:00	Report	Score by quarters: 6–5, 3–4, 6–2, 3–2			Bazen Mladost, Zagreb; Referees: Siniša Matijašević (MNE), Rik Evers (NED)
5 January 2024; 19:00	Report	Chiru 5	Goals	Galea, Muscat Melito 4	Bazen Mladost, Zagreb; Referees: Siniša Matijašević (MNE), Rik Evers (NED)

7 January 2024; 17:00	Report	Malta	13–11	Israel	Bazen Mladost, Zagreb; Referees: Boris Margeta (SLO), Rik Evers (NED)
7 January 2024; 17:00	Report	Score by quarters: 2–5, 3–3, 3–2, 5–1			Bazen Mladost, Zagreb; Referees: Boris Margeta (SLO), Rik Evers (NED)
7 January 2024; 17:00	Report	Gialanze 4	Goals	Gros 4	Bazen Mladost, Zagreb; Referees: Boris Margeta (SLO), Rik Evers (NED)

7 January 2024; 19:00	Report	Serbia	14–6	Germany	Bazen Mladost, Zagreb; Referees: Julien Bourges (FRA), Peter Radič (SVK)
7 January 2024; 19:00	Report	Score by quarters: 3–2, 5–2, 2–2, 4–0			Bazen Mladost, Zagreb; Referees: Julien Bourges (FRA), Peter Radič (SVK)
7 January 2024; 19:00	Report	Radulović 4	Goals	three players 2	Bazen Mladost, Zagreb; Referees: Julien Bourges (FRA), Peter Radič (SVK)

9 January 2024; 17:00	Report	Germany	14–8	Israel	Bazen Mladost, Zagreb; Referees: Julien Bourges (FRA), Ruben Garcia (SUI)
9 January 2024; 17:00	Report	Score by quarters: 6–3, 3–2, 3–1, 2–2			Bazen Mladost, Zagreb; Referees: Julien Bourges (FRA), Ruben Garcia (SUI)
9 January 2024; 17:00	Report	three players 3	Goals	Goldschmidt 3	Bazen Mladost, Zagreb; Referees: Julien Bourges (FRA), Ruben Garcia (SUI)

9 January 2024; 19:00	Report	Serbia	21–4	Malta	Bazen Mladost, Zagreb; Referees: Rik Evers (NED), Tomislav Copić (CRO)
9 January 2024; 19:00	Report	Score by quarters: 5–0, 6–1, 5–1, 5–2			Bazen Mladost, Zagreb; Referees: Rik Evers (NED), Tomislav Copić (CRO)
9 January 2024; 19:00	Report	Milojević 4	Goals	four players 1	Bazen Mladost, Zagreb; Referees: Rik Evers (NED), Tomislav Copić (CRO)

==== Group D ====
Pos	Team	Pld	W	PSW	PSL	L	GF	GA	GD	Pts	Qualification
1	Romania	3	3	0	0	0	33	20	+13	9	Playoffs
2	Netherlands	3	2	0	0	1	48	25	+23	6	Playoffs
3	Slovakia	3	1	0	0	2	24	32	−8	3	Classification round
4	Slovenia	3	0	0	0	3	19	47	−28	0	Classification round

Source: LEN
Rules for classification: 1) points; 2) head-to-head points; 3) head-to-head goal difference; 4) head-to-head number of goals scored; 5) Goal difference.

5 January 2024; 17:45	Report	Slovakia	11–7	Slovenia	Bazen u Gružu, Dubrovnik; Referees: Massimo Angileri (MLT), Eurico Silva (POR)
5 January 2024; 17:45	Report	Score by quarters: 5–2, 0–1, 2–2, 4–2			Bazen u Gružu, Dubrovnik; Referees: Massimo Angileri (MLT), Eurico Silva (POR)
5 January 2024; 17:45	Report	Marek Tkáč 4	Goals	Kadivec 3	Bazen u Gružu, Dubrovnik; Referees: Massimo Angileri (MLT), Eurico Silva (POR)

5 January 2024; 20:15	Report	Netherlands	8–12	Romania	Bazen u Gružu, Dubrovnik; Referees: Levan Berishvili (GEO), Hendrik Schopp (GER)
5 January 2024; 20:15	Report	Score by quarters: 1–3, 3–3, 3–4, 1–2			Bazen u Gružu, Dubrovnik; Referees: Levan Berishvili (GEO), Hendrik Schopp (GER)
5 January 2024; 20:15	Report	De Weerd, Ten Broek 2	Goals	Fulea 4	Bazen u Gružu, Dubrovnik; Referees: Levan Berishvili (GEO), Hendrik Schopp (GER)

7 January 2024; 17:45	Report	Romania	13–5	Slovenia	Bazen u Gružu, Dubrovnik; Referees: Levan Berishvili (GEO), Tal Shildan (ISR)
7 January 2024; 17:45	Report	Score by quarters: 6–1, 2–2, 2–1, 3–1			Bazen u Gružu, Dubrovnik; Referees: Levan Berishvili (GEO), Tal Shildan (ISR)
7 January 2024; 17:45	Report	Georgescu 3	Goals	five players 1	Bazen u Gružu, Dubrovnik; Referees: Levan Berishvili (GEO), Tal Shildan (ISR)

7 January 2024; 20:15	Report	Slovakia	6–17	Netherlands	Bazen u Gružu, Dubrovnik; Referees: Hendrik Schopp (GER), Eurico Silva (POR)
7 January 2024; 20:15	Report	Score by quarters: 1–5, 3–4, 2–3, 0–5			Bazen u Gružu, Dubrovnik; Referees: Hendrik Schopp (GER), Eurico Silva (POR)
7 January 2024; 20:15	Report	Baláž 3	Goals	Ten Broek 4	Bazen u Gružu, Dubrovnik; Referees: Hendrik Schopp (GER), Eurico Silva (POR)

9 January 2024; 17:45	Report	Slovakia	7–8	Romania	Bazen u Gružu, Dubrovnik; Referees: Hendrik Schopp (GER), Tal Shildan (ISR)
9 January 2024; 17:45	Report	Score by quarters: 1–1, 3–3, 3–2, 0–2			Bazen u Gružu, Dubrovnik; Referees: Hendrik Schopp (GER), Tal Shildan (ISR)
9 January 2024; 17:45	Report	Baláž, Marek Tkáč 2	Goals	Fulea 4	Bazen u Gružu, Dubrovnik; Referees: Hendrik Schopp (GER), Tal Shildan (ISR)

9 January 2024; 20:15	Report	Netherlands	23–7	Slovenia	Bazen u Gružu, Dubrovnik; Referees: Massimo Angileri (MLT), Eurico Silva (POR)
9 January 2024; 20:15	Report	Score by quarters: 7–2, 4–1, 8–3, 4–1			Bazen u Gružu, Dubrovnik; Referees: Massimo Angileri (MLT), Eurico Silva (POR)
9 January 2024; 20:15	Report	Ten Broek, Van der Weijden 5	Goals	Stefanović 3	Bazen u Gružu, Dubrovnik; Referees: Massimo Angileri (MLT), Eurico Silva (POR)

== Knockout stage ==
=== Bracket ===
Play-offs
10 January
France	10
Serbia	14
11 January
Greece	15
Netherlands	10
11 January
Georgia	11
Romania	18
10 January
Montenegro	10
Germany	5

Quarter-finals
12 January
Hungary (PSO)	10 (5)
Serbia	10 (4)
12 January
Croatia	13
Greece	8
12 January
Spain	24
Romania	7
12 January
Italy	14
Montenegro	8

Semi-finals
14 January
Hungary	8
Croatia	11
14 January
Spain	7
Italy	4

Final
16 January
Croatia	10
Spain	11
Third place
16 January
Hungary	7
Italy	12

=== Playoffs ===
10 January 2024; 18:30	Report	France	10–14	Serbia	Bazen Mladost, Zagreb; Referees: Boris Margeta (SLO), Pau Segurana Ferré (ESP)
10 January 2024; 18:30	Report	Score by quarters: 2–3, 4–3, 1–3, 3–5			Bazen Mladost, Zagreb; Referees: Boris Margeta (SLO), Pau Segurana Ferré (ESP)
10 January 2024; 18:30	Report	Vernoux 3	Goals	Drašović, Mandić 4	Bazen Mladost, Zagreb; Referees: Boris Margeta (SLO), Pau Segurana Ferré (ESP)

10 January 2024; 20:15	Report	Montenegro	10–5	Germany	Bazen Mladost, Zagreb; Referees: Adrian-Tiberiu Alexandrescu (ROU), Julien Bourges (FRA)
10 January 2024; 20:15	Report	Score by quarters: 3–1, 3–2, 4–1, 0–1			Bazen Mladost, Zagreb; Referees: Adrian-Tiberiu Alexandrescu (ROU), Julien Bourges (FRA)
10 January 2024; 20:15	Report	Ukropina 3	Goals	Strelezkij 3	Bazen Mladost, Zagreb; Referees: Adrian-Tiberiu Alexandrescu (ROU), Julien Bourges (FRA)

11 January 2024; 17:00	Report	Greece	15–10	Netherlands	Bazen Mladost, Zagreb; Referees: Vojin Putniković (SRB), Tamás Kovács Csatlós (HUN)
11 January 2024; 17:00	Report	Score by quarters: 5–3, 4–2, 3–3, 3–2			Bazen Mladost, Zagreb; Referees: Vojin Putniković (SRB), Tamás Kovács Csatlós (HUN)
11 January 2024; 17:00	Report	Genidounias 5	Goals	Te Riele 4	Bazen Mladost, Zagreb; Referees: Vojin Putniković (SRB), Tamás Kovács Csatlós (HUN)

11 January 2024; 19:00	Report	Georgia	11–18	Romania	Bazen Mladost, Zagreb; Referees: Georgios Stavridis (GRE), Raffaele Colombo (ITA)
11 January 2024; 19:00	Report	Score by quarters: 1–5, 3–5, 2–3, 5–5			Bazen Mladost, Zagreb; Referees: Georgios Stavridis (GRE), Raffaele Colombo (ITA)
11 January 2024; 19:00	Report	Vasić 3	Goals	Georgescu 5	Bazen Mladost, Zagreb; Referees: Georgios Stavridis (GRE), Raffaele Colombo (ITA)

=== 13–16th place bracket ===
13–16th place semifinals
11 January
Slovakia	15
Israel	9
11 January
Slovenia	10
Malta	8

13th place
13 January
Slovakia	14
Slovenia	10
15th place
13 January
Israel	12 (4)
Malta (PSO)	12 (5)

==== 13–16th place semifinals ====
11 January 2024; 17:45	Report	Slovakia	15–9	Israel	Bazen u Gružu, Dubrovnik; Referees: Levan Berishvili (GEO), Rik Evers (NED)
11 January 2024; 17:45	Report	Score by quarters: 4–2, 1–3, 4–0, 6–4			Bazen u Gružu, Dubrovnik; Referees: Levan Berishvili (GEO), Rik Evers (NED)
11 January 2024; 17:45	Report	Furman 6	Goals	Goldschmidt 4	Bazen u Gružu, Dubrovnik; Referees: Levan Berishvili (GEO), Rik Evers (NED)

11 January 2024; 20:15	Report	Slovenia	10–8	Malta	Bazen u Gružu, Dubrovnik; Referees: Hendrik Schopp (GER), Siniša Matijašević (MNE)
11 January 2024; 20:15	Report	Score by quarters: 2–2, 4–3, 2–1, 2–2			Bazen u Gružu, Dubrovnik; Referees: Hendrik Schopp (GER), Siniša Matijašević (MNE)
11 January 2024; 20:15	Report	Troppan 4	Goals	Cutajar 4	Bazen u Gružu, Dubrovnik; Referees: Hendrik Schopp (GER), Siniša Matijašević (MNE)

==== 15th place game ====
13 January 2024; 11:15	Report	Israel	16–17 (PSO)	Malta	Bazen u Gružu, Dubrovnik; Referees: Eurico Silva (POR), Peter Radič (SVK)
13 January 2024; 11:15	Report	Score by quarters: 4–4, 3–1, 2–2, 3–5 PSO: 4–5			Bazen u Gružu, Dubrovnik; Referees: Eurico Silva (POR), Peter Radič (SVK)
13 January 2024; 11:15	Report	Goldschmidt 3	Goals	Muscat 6	Bazen u Gružu, Dubrovnik; Referees: Eurico Silva (POR), Peter Radič (SVK)

==== 13th place game ====
13 January 2024; 13:30	Report	Slovakia	14–10	Slovenia	Bazen u Gružu, Dubrovnik; Referees: Tal Shildan (ISR), Massimo Angileri (MLT)
13 January 2024; 13:30	Report	Score by quarters: 3–2, 4–2, 3–4, 4–2			Bazen u Gružu, Dubrovnik; Referees: Tal Shildan (ISR), Massimo Angileri (MLT)
13 January 2024; 13:30	Report	Baláž 5	Goals	Lah, Troppan 3	Bazen u Gružu, Dubrovnik; Referees: Tal Shildan (ISR), Massimo Angileri (MLT)

=== 9–12th place bracket ===
9–12th place semifinals
13 January
France	16
Netherlands	9
13 January
Georgia	15
Germany	10

Ninth place
15 January
France	12
Georgia	6
Eleventh place
15 January
Netherlands	16
Germany	10

==== 9–12th place semifinals ====
13 January 2024; 15:45	Report	France	16–9	Netherlands	Bazen u Gružu, Dubrovnik; Referees: Levan Berishvili (GEO), Hendrik Schopp (GER)
13 January 2024; 15:45	Report	Score by quarters: 4–2, 4–3, 4–2, 4–2			Bazen u Gružu, Dubrovnik; Referees: Levan Berishvili (GEO), Hendrik Schopp (GER)
13 January 2024; 15:45	Report	Vernoux 5	Goals	Muller 3	Bazen u Gružu, Dubrovnik; Referees: Levan Berishvili (GEO), Hendrik Schopp (GER)

13 January 2024; 18:00	Report	Georgia	15–10	Germany	Bazen u Gružu, Dubrovnik; Referees: Siniša Matijašević (MNE), Rik Evers (NED)
13 January 2024; 18:00	Report	Score by quarters: 1–2, 5–4, 2–3, 7–1			Bazen u Gružu, Dubrovnik; Referees: Siniša Matijašević (MNE), Rik Evers (NED)
13 January 2024; 18:00	Report	Vasić 5	Goals	Strelezkij 4	Bazen u Gružu, Dubrovnik; Referees: Siniša Matijašević (MNE), Rik Evers (NED)

==== Eleventh place game ====
15 January 2024; 17:45	Report	Netherlands	16–10	Germany	Bazen u Gružu, Dubrovnik; Referees: Siniša Matijašević (MNE), Levan Berishvili (GEO)
15 January 2024; 17:45	Report	Score by quarters: 5–2, 6–5, 3–2, 2–1			Bazen u Gružu, Dubrovnik; Referees: Siniša Matijašević (MNE), Levan Berishvili (GEO)
15 January 2024; 17:45	Report	Koopman, Van der Weijden 4	Goals	Chiru 5	Bazen u Gružu, Dubrovnik; Referees: Siniša Matijašević (MNE), Levan Berishvili (GEO)

==== Ninth place game ====
15 January 2024; 20:15	Report	France	12–6	Georgia	Bazen u Gružu, Dubrovnik; Referees: Rik Evers (NED), Hendrik Schopp (GER)
15 January 2024; 20:15	Report	Score by quarters: 2–1, 3–1, 3–3, 4–1			Bazen u Gružu, Dubrovnik; Referees: Rik Evers (NED), Hendrik Schopp (GER)
15 January 2024; 20:15	Report	Vernoux 5	Goals	Akhvlediani, Dzikhtsiarenka 2	Bazen u Gružu, Dubrovnik; Referees: Rik Evers (NED), Hendrik Schopp (GER)

=== Quarterfinals ===
12 January 2024; 15:00	Report	Hungary	15–14 (PSO)	Serbia	Bazen Mladost, Zagreb; Referees: Adrian-Tiberiu Alexandrescu (ROU), Pau Segurana Ferré (ESP)
12 January 2024; 15:00	Report	Score by quarters: 3–3, 2–2, 4–3, 1–2 PSO: 5–4			Bazen Mladost, Zagreb; Referees: Adrian-Tiberiu Alexandrescu (ROU), Pau Segurana Ferré (ESP)
12 January 2024; 15:00	Report	Vi. Vigvári 4	Goals	four players 2	Bazen Mladost, Zagreb; Referees: Adrian-Tiberiu Alexandrescu (ROU), Pau Segurana Ferré (ESP)

12 January 2024; 16:30	Report	Spain	24–7	Romania	Bazen Mladost, Zagreb; Referees: Julien Bourges (FRA), Tomislav Copić (CRO)
12 January 2024; 16:30	Report	Score by quarters: 6–2, 4–2, 7–1, 7–2			Bazen Mladost, Zagreb; Referees: Julien Bourges (FRA), Tomislav Copić (CRO)
12 January 2024; 16:30	Report	Granados 6	Goals	Belenyesi 2	Bazen Mladost, Zagreb; Referees: Julien Bourges (FRA), Tomislav Copić (CRO)

12 January 2024; 18:30	Report	Croatia	13–8	Greece	Bazen Mladost, Zagreb; Referees: Boris Margeta (SLO), Raffaele Colombo (ITA)
12 January 2024; 18:30	Report	Score by quarters: 3–3, 2–3, 4–0, 4–2			Bazen Mladost, Zagreb; Referees: Boris Margeta (SLO), Raffaele Colombo (ITA)
12 January 2024; 18:30	Report	Marinić Kragić 4	Goals	Argyropoulos, Papanastasiou 2	Bazen Mladost, Zagreb; Referees: Boris Margeta (SLO), Raffaele Colombo (ITA)

12 January 2024; 20:15	Report	Italy	14–8	Montenegro	Bazen Mladost, Zagreb; Referees: Georgios Stavridis (GRE), Tamás Kovács Csatlós (HUN)
12 January 2024; 20:15	Report	Score by quarters: 3–4, 5–0, 3–1, 3–3			Bazen Mladost, Zagreb; Referees: Georgios Stavridis (GRE), Tamás Kovács Csatlós (HUN)
12 January 2024; 20:15	Report	Di Somma 4	Goals	Đ. Radović 2	Bazen Mladost, Zagreb; Referees: Georgios Stavridis (GRE), Tamás Kovács Csatlós (HUN)

=== 5–8th place bracket ===
5–8th place semifinals
14 January
Serbia	10
Greece	12
14 January
Romania	11
Montenegro	18

Fifth place
16 January
Greece	15
Montenegro	10
Seventh place
16 January
Serbia	18
Romania	7

==== 5–8th place semifinals ====
14 January 2024; 15:00	Report	Serbia	10–12	Greece	Bazen Mladost, Zagreb; Referees: Tamás Kovács Csatlós (HUN), Julien Bourges (FRA)
14 January 2024; 15:00	Report	Score by quarters: 5–3, 2–4, 1–1, 2–4			Bazen Mladost, Zagreb; Referees: Tamás Kovács Csatlós (HUN), Julien Bourges (FRA)
14 January 2024; 15:00	Report	Mandić 3	Goals	Fountoulis, Genidounias 3	Bazen Mladost, Zagreb; Referees: Tamás Kovács Csatlós (HUN), Julien Bourges (FRA)

14 January 2024; 20:15	Report	Romania	11–18	Montenegro	Bazen Mladost, Zagreb; Referees: Ruben Garcia (SUI), Tomislav Copić (CRO)
14 January 2024; 20:15	Report	Score by quarters: 3–4, 3–5, 2–4, 3–5			Bazen Mladost, Zagreb; Referees: Ruben Garcia (SUI), Tomislav Copić (CRO)
14 January 2024; 20:15	Report	Georgescu 3	Goals	Đ. Radović 4	Bazen Mladost, Zagreb; Referees: Ruben Garcia (SUI), Tomislav Copić (CRO)

==== Seventh place game ====
16 January 2024; 15:00	Report	Serbia	18–7	Romania	Bazen Mladost, Zagreb; Referees: Raffaele Colombo (ITA), Julien Bourges (FRA)
16 January 2024; 15:00	Report	Score by quarters: 5–1, 3–2, 4–1, 6–3			Bazen Mladost, Zagreb; Referees: Raffaele Colombo (ITA), Julien Bourges (FRA)
16 January 2024; 15:00	Report	Lazić, Mandić 4	Goals	Vranceanu 2	Bazen Mladost, Zagreb; Referees: Raffaele Colombo (ITA), Julien Bourges (FRA)

==== Fifth place game ====
16 January 2024; 18:30	Report	Greece	15–10	Montenegro	Bazen Mladost, Zagreb; Referees: Tamás Kovács Csatlós (HUN), Pau Segurana Ferré (ESP)
16 January 2024; 18:30	Report	Score by quarters: 6–2, 2–3, 1–2, 6–3			Bazen Mladost, Zagreb; Referees: Tamás Kovács Csatlós (HUN), Pau Segurana Ferré (ESP)
16 January 2024; 18:30	Report	Genidounias 4	Goals	three players 2	Bazen Mladost, Zagreb; Referees: Tamás Kovács Csatlós (HUN), Pau Segurana Ferré (ESP)

=== Semifinals ===
14 January 2024; 16:30	Report	Spain	7–4	Italy	Bazen Mladost, Zagreb; Referees: Boris Margeta (SLO), Georgios Stavridis (GRE)
14 January 2024; 16:30	Report	Score by quarters: 2–1, 2–0, 1–0, 2–3			Bazen Mladost, Zagreb; Referees: Boris Margeta (SLO), Georgios Stavridis (GRE)
14 January 2024; 16:30	Report	Granados, Perrone 2	Goals	Condemi 2	Bazen Mladost, Zagreb; Referees: Boris Margeta (SLO), Georgios Stavridis (GRE)

14 January 2024; 18:30	Report	Hungary	8–11	Croatia	Bazen Mladost, Zagreb; Referees: Adrian-Tiberiu Alexandrescu (ROU), Vojin Putniković (SRB)
14 January 2024; 18:30	Report	Score by quarters: 2–2, 0–2, 4–3, 2–4			Bazen Mladost, Zagreb; Referees: Adrian-Tiberiu Alexandrescu (ROU), Vojin Putniković (SRB)
14 January 2024; 18:30	Report	Nagy, Vi. Vigvári 3	Goals	Marinić Kragić 3	Bazen Mladost, Zagreb; Referees: Adrian-Tiberiu Alexandrescu (ROU), Vojin Putniković (SRB)

=== Third place game ===
16 January 2024; 16:30	Report	Hungary	7–12	Italy	Bazen Mladost, Zagreb; Referees: Adrian-Tiberiu Alexandrescu (ROU), Vojin Putniković (SRB)
16 January 2024; 16:30	Report	Score by quarters: 1–4, 2–4, 1–2, 3–2			Bazen Mladost, Zagreb; Referees: Adrian-Tiberiu Alexandrescu (ROU), Vojin Putniković (SRB)
16 January 2024; 16:30	Report	Vi. Vigvári 3	Goals	Echenique, Fondelli 3	Bazen Mladost, Zagreb; Referees: Adrian-Tiberiu Alexandrescu (ROU), Vojin Putniković (SRB)

=== Final ===
16 January 2024; 20:15	Report	Croatia	10–11	Spain	Bazen Mladost, Zagreb; Referees: Boris Margeta (SLO), Georgios Stavridis (GRE)
16 January 2024; 20:15	Report	Score by quarters: 5–3, 2–3, 3–2, 0–3			Bazen Mladost, Zagreb; Referees: Boris Margeta (SLO), Georgios Stavridis (GRE)
16 January 2024; 20:15	Report	Bukić 4	Goals	Granados, Sanahuja 3	Bazen Mladost, Zagreb; Referees: Boris Margeta (SLO), Georgios Stavridis (GRE)

== Final standings ==
Spain qualified for the 2024 Summer Olympics as the highest ranked team not yet qualified for the event. Croatia, Montenegro and Romania secured the three remaining European tickets to the 2024 World Aquatics Championships.

Rank	Team
1st place, gold medalist(s)	Spain
2nd place, silver medalist(s)	Croatia
3rd place, bronze medalist(s)	Italy
4	Hungary
5	Greece
6	Montenegro
7	Serbia
8	Romania
9	France
10	Georgia
11	Netherlands
12	Germany
13	Slovakia
14	Slovenia
15	Malta
16	Israel

Qualified for the 2024 Summer Olympics
Qualified for the 2024 World Championships

2024 Men's European Water Polo Championship

Spain
First title

== Awards and statistics ==
=== Top goalscorers ===
Rank	Name	Goals	Shots	%
1	(Croatia) Nikolay Bonev	25	40	62
2	(Spain) Álvaro Granados	21	47	45
3	(Serbia) Dušan Mandić	19	34	56
4	(Greece) Konstantinos Genidounias	17	29	59
5	(Netherlands) Lars ten Broek	16	30	53
5	(Serbia) Marko Radulović	16	33	48
5	(Germany) Denis Strelezkij	16	47	34
8	(Netherlands) Mart van der Weijden	15	26	58
8	(Hungary) Vince Vigvári	15	38	39
8	(Romania) Vlad Georgescu	15	39	38
8	(Malta) Jake Muscat Melito	15	44	34

=== Awards ===
The awards were announced on 16 January 2024.

Position	Player
Best goalkeeper	(Croatia) Marko Bijač
Most Valuable Player	(Croatia) Nikolay Bonev

== Marketing ==
On 7 December 2023, the Croatian Water Polo Federation announced the logo for the event. Logo was inspired by Croatian interlace and slogan of the championship was: "Waves of Unity".
