= 2016 LEN Super Cup =

Water polo match

Jug Dubrovnik	Brescia
(Croatia)	(Italy)
10	4
- Date: 14 December 2016
- Venue: Bazen u Gružu, (Croatia) Dubrovnik
- Attendance: 1200

The 2016 LEN Super Cup was the 35th edition of the annual trophy organised by LEN and contested by the reigning champions of the two European competitions for men's water polo clubs. The match took place between Croatian side VK Jug (2015–16 European Champions) and Italian side AN Brescia (Euro Cup's holder) at the Gruž City Pool in Dubrovnik, Croatia, on 14 December 2016.

The teams already faced each other in the 2006 edition. Jug defeated Brescia as it happened 10 years before and won the trophy for the second time, while the Italian team lost the Super Cup final for the third time in its history.

== Teams ==
Team	Qualification	Previous participation (bold indicates winners)
(Croatia) VK Jug	Winners of the 2015–16 LEN Champions League	1981, **2006**
(Italy) AN Brescia	Winners of the 2015–16 LEN Euro Cup	2003, 2006

=== Squads ===
Jug Dubrovnik
№	**Nat.**	**Player**	**Birth Date**	**Position**
1	(Croatia)	Marko Bijač	12 January 1991	Goalkeeper
2	(Croatia)	Marko Macan	26 April 1993	Field Player
3	(Croatia)	Loren Fatović	16 November 1996	Field Player
4	(Croatia)	Luka Lončar	26 June 1987	Field Player
5	(Croatia)	Maro Joković	1 October 1987	Field Player
6	(Croatia)	Xavier García	5 January 1984	Field Player
7	(Croatia)	Josip Vrlić	25 April 1986	Field Player
8	(Croatia)	Marko Ivanković	17 December 1991	Field Player
9	(Croatia)	Nikola Pavličević	13 February 1997	Field Player
10	(Brazil)	Felipe Perrone	27 February 1986	Field Player
11	(Croatia)	Hrvoje Benić	26 April 1992	Field Player
12	(Croatia)	Paulo Obradović	9 March 1986	Field Player
13	(Croatia)	Toni Popadić	5 November 1994	Goalkeeper

Head coach: Vjekoslav Kobeščak

Brescia
№	**Nat.**	**Player**	**Birth Date**	**Position**
1	(Italy)	Marco Del Lungo	1 March 1990	Goalkeeper
2	(Italy)	Edoardo Manzi	22 June 1998	Field Player
3	(Italy)	Christian Presciutti	27 November 1982	Field Player
4	(Serbia)	Sava Ranđelović	17 July 1993	Field Player
5	(Montenegro)	Vjekoslav Pasković	23 March 1985	Field Player
6	(Italy)	Valerio Rizzo	21 September 1984	Field Player
7	(Croatia)	Petar Muslim	26 March 1988	Field Player
8	(Italy)	Alessandro Nora	24 May 1987	Field Player
9	(Italy)	Nicholas Presciutti	14 December 1993	Field Player
10	(Italy)	Zeno Bertoli	22 December 1988	Field Player
11	(Serbia)	Nemanja Ubović	22 February 1991	Field Player
12	(Italy)	Christian Napolitano	22 July 1982	Field Player
13	(Italy)	Brando Dian	18 January 1991	Goalkeeper

Head coach: Alessandro Bovo

== Match ==
14 December 2016; 18:00 (CET)	Report	(Croatia) Jug Dubrovnik	10–4	Brescia (Italy)	Bazen u Gružu, Dubrovnik; Attendance: 1200; Referees: Stavridis (GRE), Margeta (SLO)
14 December 2016; 18:00 (CET)	Report	Score by quarters: 2–0, 2–0, 3–0, 3–4			Bazen u Gružu, Dubrovnik; Attendance: 1200; Referees: Stavridis (GRE), Margeta (SLO)
14 December 2016; 18:00 (CET)	Report	3: Lončar; 2: Perrone; 1: Fatović, García, Ivanović, Benić, Obradović	Goals	1: Manzi, Muslim, N. Presciutti, Ubović	Bazen u Gružu, Dubrovnik; Attendance: 1200; Referees: Stavridis (GRE), Margeta (SLO)

== See also ==
- 2016 Women's LEN Super Cup
