= 2014–15 LEN Champions League =

Water polo sports season

- League: LEN Champions League
- Sport: Water Polo
- Duration: 26 September 2014 to 30 May 2015
- Teams: 12 (preliminary round); 26 (total)
- Season MVP: (Croatia) Sandro Sukno (Primorje Rijeka)
- Top scorer: (Croatia) Sandro Sukno 34 goals (Primorje Rijeka)

Final Six
- Finals champions: (Italy) Pro Recco (8th title)
- Runners-up: (Croatia) Primorje
- Finals MVP: (Spain) Felipe Perrone (CN Atlètic-Barceloneta)

Champions League seasons
- ← 2013–14 2015−16 →

The 2014–15 LEN Champions League was the 52nd edition of LEN's premier competition for men's water polo clubs. It ran from 26 September 2014 to 30 May 2015, and it is contested by 26 teams from 13 countries. The Final Six (quarterfinals, semifinals, final, and third place game) took place on May 28 and May 30 in Barcelona.

== Overview ==
=== Team allocation ===
8 teams are directly qualified for the preliminary round.

Preliminary round
(Croatia) Jug	(Germany) Spandau 04	(Hungary) Eger	(Serbia) Partizan
(Spain) Atlètic-Barceloneta^{TH}	(Greece) Olympiacos	(Italy) Brescia	(Turkey) Galatasaray
Qualification round II
(Croatia) Primorje	(Hungary) Szolnok	(Serbia) Crvena Zvezda	(Turkey) İstanbul YİK
(Germany) Duisburg	(Italy) Pro Recco		
Qualification round I
(Croatia) Mladost	(Georgia (country)) Ligamus Tbilisi	(Italy) Posillipo	(Russia) Spartak Volgograd
(France) Montpellier	(Germany) Waspo 98 Hannover	(Montenegro) Jadran	(Russia) Sintez Kazan
(France) Marseille	(Hungary) Orvosegyetem	(Romania) Oradea	(Serbia) Radnički Kragujevac

=== Round and draw dates ===
The schedule of the competition is as follows.

Phase	Round	First leg	Second leg
Qualifying	Qualification round I	26–28 September 2014	
Qualifying	Qualification round II	17–19 October 2014	
Qualifying	Qualification round III (Play-off round)	29 October 2014	12 November 2014
Preliminary round	Matchday 1	29 November 2014	
Preliminary round	Matchday 2	17 December 2014	
Preliminary round	Matchday 3	14 January 2015	
Preliminary round	Matchday 4	28 January 2015	
Preliminary round	Matchday 5	11 February 2015	
Preliminary round	Matchday 6	4 March 2015	
Preliminary round	Matchday 7	25 March 2015	
Preliminary round	Matchday 8	8 April 2015	
Preliminary round	Matchday 9	18 April 2015	
Preliminary round	Matchday 10	2 May 2015	
Final 6 (Barcelona)	Quarter-finals	28 May 2015 at Piscines Picornell	
Final 6 (Barcelona)	Semi-finals	29 May 2015 at Piscines Picornell	
Final 6 (Barcelona)	Final	30 May 2015 at Piscines Picornell	

== Qualifying rounds ==
=== Qualification round I ===
- 26-28 September

Twelve teams will take part in the Qualification round I. They will be drawn into two groups of six teams, whose played on 26–28 September 2014. Top 5 teams of each group advance to qualification round II. Teams finishing 6th continue in 2014–15 LEN Euro Cup qualification.

Key to colors in group tables
Progress to the Round II

==== Group A ====
CN Marseille has the right to organize the tournament.

Team	Pld	W	D	L	GF	GA	GD	Pts
(Hungary) Orvosegyetem	5	4	1	0	61	29	+32	13
(Russia) Spartak Volgograd	5	4	1	0	68	46	+22	13
(Serbia) Radnički Kragujevac	5	3	0	2	47	37	+10	9
(France) Marseille	5	2	0	3	55	51	+4	6
(Italy) Posillipo	5	1	0	4	40	51	−11	3
(Georgia (country)) Ligamus Tbilisi	5	0	0	5	28	85	−57	0

==== Group B ====
Jadran Herceg Novi has the right to organize the tournament.

Team	Pld	W	D	L	GF	GA	GD	Pts
(Croatia) Mladost	5	5	0	0	57	35	+22	15
(Russia) Sintez Kazan	5	4	0	1	53	43	+10	12
(Montenegro) Jadran	5	2	1	2	40	40	0	7
(Germany) Waspo 98 Hannover	5	1	1	3	46	56	−10	4
(Romania) Oradea	5	0	3	2	36	44	−8	3
(France) Montpellier	5	0	1	4	40	54	−14	1

=== Qualification round II ===
- 17–19 October

Sixteen teams will take part in the Qualification round II. These clubs will form four groups of four and will have round robin tournaments at four host cities on 17–19 October. Top 2 of these groups advance to play-off (qualification round 3), Teams finishing 3rd, 4th continue in 2014–15 LEN Euro Cup qualification.

Key to colors in group tables
Progress to the Round III

==== Group C ====
Waspo Hannover has the right to organize the tournament.

Team	Pld	W	D	L	GF	GA	GD	Pts
(Italy) Pro Recco	3	3	0	0	45	19	+26	9
(Serbia) Crvena Zvezda	3	1	0	2	30	32	−2	3
(Russia) Spartak Volgograd	3	1	0	2	26	38	−12	3
(Germany) Waspo Hannover	3	1	0	2	26	38	−12	3

==== Group D ====
Orvosegyetem SC has the right to organize the tournament.

Team	Pld	W	D	L	GF	GA	GD	Pts
(Hungary) Orvosegyetem	3	3	0	0	36	27	+9	9
(Romania) Oradea	3	2	0	1	36	32	+4	6
(Russia) Sintez Kazan	3	1	0	2	38	37	+1	3
(Germany) Duisburg	3	0	0	3	29	43	−14	0

==== Group E ====
HAVK Mladost has the right to organize the tournament.

Team	Pld	W	D	L	GF	GA	GD	Pts
(Croatia) Primorje	3	3	0	0	35	18	+17	9
(Croatia) Mladost	3	1	1	1	24	24	0	4
(Montenegro) Jadran	3	1	1	1	20	24	−4	4
(France) Marseille	3	0	0	3	24	37	−13	0

==== Group F ====
Radnički Kragujevac has the right to organize the tournament.

Team	Pld	W	D	L	GF	GA	GD	Pts
(Serbia) Radnički Kragujevac	3	3	0	0	39	18	+21	9
(Hungary) Szolnok	3	2	0	1	41	27	+14	6
(Italy) Posillipo	3	1	0	2	23	29	−6	3
(Turkey) İstanbul YİK	3	0	0	3	20	49	−29	0

=== Qualification round III ===
- 29 October 2014 1st match
- 12 November 2014 2nd match

Key to colors
Seeded in qualification round III draw
Unseeded in qualification round III draw

Group	Winners	Runners-up
C	(Italy) Pro Recco	(Serbia) Crvena Zvezda
D	(Hungary) Orvosegyetem	(Romania) Oradea
E	(Croatia) Primorje	(Croatia) Mladost
F	(Serbia) Radnički Kragujevac	(Hungary) Szolnok

Eight teams will take part in the Qualification round III. These teams played against each other over two legs on a home-and-away basis. The mechanism of the draws for each round was as follow:

- In the draw for the Qualification round III, the four group winners were seeded, and the four group runners-up were unseeded. The seeded teams were drawn against the unseeded teams, with the seeded teams hosting the second leg. Teams from the same group could not be drawn against each other.

The first legs were played on 29 October, and the second legs were played on 12 November 2014.

Team 1	Agg.	Team 2	1st leg	2nd leg
Orvosegyetem (Hungary)	20–22	(Hungary) Szolnok	11–11	9–11
Pro Recco (Italy)	22–14	(Croatia) Mladost	13–9	9–5
Crvena Zvezda (Serbia)	19–29	(Croatia) Primorje	11–14	8–15
Radnički Kragujevac (Serbia)	22–18	(Romania) Oradea	13–8	9–10

== Preliminary round ==
Location of teams of the 2014–15 LEN Champions League group stage.
Red: Group A; Blue: Group B.

The regular season was played between 29 November 2014 and 2 May 2015. If teams are level on record at the end of the preliminary round, tiebreakers are applied in the following order:

1. Head-to-head record.
2. Head-to-head point differential.
3. Point differential during the Regular Season.
4. Points scored during the regular season.
5. Sum of quotients of points scored and points allowed in each Regular Season match.

In each group, teams played against each other home-and-away in a round-robin format. The matchdays were 29 November, 17 December 2014, 14 January, 28 January, 11 February, 4 March, 25 March, 8 April, 18 April, and 2 May 2015. The top three teams advanced to the final six.

The Final Six (quarterfinals, semifinals, third place game and final) will be played in Barcelona, Spain from 28 to 30 May 2015.

Key to colors
Top three places in each group advance to Final Six

=== Group A ===
Team	Pld	W	D	L	GF	GA	GD	Pts	REC	EGE	OLY	BAR	RAD	BRE
(Italy) Pro Recco	10	10	0	0	129	68	+61	30	—	11–9	17–12	17−7	19–6	8–5
(Hungary) Eger	10	5	1	4	82	79	+3	16	4–12	—	10–9	11–6	7–6	10–5
(Greece) Olympiacos	10	4	1	5	90	95	−5	13	8–12	8−6	—	7–9	13–7	8–6
(Spain) Atlètic-Barceloneta (H)	10	3	2	5	75	103	−28	11	7–15	7–7	12–8	—	9–7	7–7
(Serbia) Radnički Kragujevac	10	3	0	7	81	105	−24	9	5–12	12–11	7–8	12−7	—	13−10
(Italy) Brescia	10	2	2	6	71	78	−7	8	5–6	3−7	9–9	12–4	9–6	—

(H) Host Final Six

=== Group B ===
Team	Pld	W	D	L	GF	GA	GD	Pts	PRI	SZO	JUG	PAR	SPA	GAL
(Croatia) Primorje	10	8	0	2	114	74	+40	24	—	9–7	10–5	14−8	11−5	16–11
(Hungary) Szolnok	10	8	0	2	122	90	+32	24	13–12	—	8−7	12–7	11–7	15–11
(Croatia) Jug	10	7	1	2	94	73	+21	22	9–6	11–9	—	13–6	12–6	11−5
(Serbia) Partizan	10	3	0	7	76	100	−24	9	7–11	7–13	3–5	—	8–6	10–7
(Germany) Spandau 04	10	2	0	8	70	109	−39	6	5–15	7–17	8–9	8–6	—	10−9
(Turkey) Galatasaray	10	1	1	8	93	123	−30	4	4–10	12–17	12–12	11–14	11–8	—

== Final Six (Barcelona) ==
Piscines Bernat Picornell, Barcelona, Spain

Quarterfinals; 28 May 2015
A2	(Hungary) Eger	8
B3	(Croatia) Jug Dubrovnik	10
A3	(Spain) Atlètic-Barceloneta (pen)	10
B2	(Hungary) Szolnok	9

Semifinals; 29 May 2015
B1	(Croatia) Primorje	10
B3	(Croatia) Jug Dubrovnik	9
A1	(Italy) Pro Recco	12
A3	(Spain) Atlètic-Barceloneta	11
5th place
A2	(Hungary) Eger	8
B2	(Hungary) Szolnok	7

Final; 30 May 2015
B1	(Croatia) Primorje	7
A1	(Italy) Pro Recco	8
Third place
A3	(Croatia) Jug Dubrovnik	12
B3	(Spain) Atlètic-Barceloneta	14

Quarter-finals

28 May; 18:00	Report	Eger (Hungary)	8–10	(Croatia) Jug Dubrovnik	Piscines Bernat Picornell, Barcelona; Referees: Alexandrescu, Naumov
28 May; 18:00	Report	Score by quarters: 1–2, 2–2, 2–3, 3–3			Piscines Bernat Picornell, Barcelona; Referees: Alexandrescu, Naumov
28 May; 18:00	Report	Szívós, Vapenski 2	Goals	Bušlje 3	Piscines Bernat Picornell, Barcelona; Referees: Alexandrescu, Naumov

28 May; 19:30	Report	Atlètic-Barceloneta (Spain)	10–9 (OT)	(Hungary) Szolnok	Piscines Bernat Picornell, Barcelona; Referees: Margeta, Schwartz
28 May; 19:30	Report	Score by quarters: 2–1, 2–1, 2–1, 0–3 OT: pen. 4–3			Piscines Bernat Picornell, Barcelona; Referees: Margeta, Schwartz
28 May; 19:30	Report	six players 1	Goals	Madaras 3	Piscines Bernat Picornell, Barcelona; Referees: Margeta, Schwartz

5th place

29 May; 16:30	Report	Eger (Hungary)	8–7	(Hungary) Szolnok	Piscines Bernat Picornell, Barcelona; Referees: Naumov, Schwartz
29 May; 16:30	Report	Score by quarters: 3–1, 1–3, 3–2, 1–1			Piscines Bernat Picornell, Barcelona; Referees: Naumov, Schwartz
29 May; 16:30	Report	three players 2	Goals	Dé. Varga 4	Piscines Bernat Picornell, Barcelona; Referees: Naumov, Schwartz

Semi-finals

29 May; 18:00	Report	Jug Dubrovnik (Croatia)	9–10	(Croatia) Primorje	Piscines Bernat Picornell, Barcelona; Referees: Margeta, Alexandrescu
29 May; 18:00	Report	Score by quarters: 2–2, 3–2, 2–4, 2–2			Piscines Bernat Picornell, Barcelona; Referees: Margeta, Alexandrescu
29 May; 18:00	Report	Janović 3	Goals	Sukno 4	Piscines Bernat Picornell, Barcelona; Referees: Margeta, Alexandrescu

29 May; 19:30	Report	Atlètic-Barceloneta (Spain)	11–12	(Italy) Pro Recco	Piscines Bernat Picornell, Barcelona; Referees: Koryzna, Stavridis
29 May; 19:30	Report	Score by quarters: 3–2, 4–3, 3–5, 1–2			Piscines Bernat Picornell, Barcelona; Referees: Koryzna, Stavridis
29 May; 19:30	Report	Perrone 4	Goals	Filipović 5	Piscines Bernat Picornell, Barcelona; Referees: Koryzna, Stavridis

Third place

30 May; 18:00	Report	Jug Dubrovnik (Croatia)	12–14	(Spain) Atlètic-Barceloneta	Piscines Bernat Picornell, Barcelona; Referees: Naumov, Alexandrescu
30 May; 18:00	Report	Score by quarters: 5–3, 3–5, 1–3, 3–3			Piscines Bernat Picornell, Barcelona; Referees: Naumov, Alexandrescu
30 May; 18:00	Report	Obradović 4	Goals	Perrone 4	Piscines Bernat Picornell, Barcelona; Referees: Naumov, Alexandrescu

Final

30 May; 19:30	Report	Primorje (Croatia)	7–8	(Italy) Pro Recco	Piscines Bernat Picornell, Barcelona; Referees: Margeta, Stavridis
30 May; 19:30	Report	Score by quarters: 3–1, 0–2, 2–4, 2–1			Piscines Bernat Picornell, Barcelona; Referees: Margeta, Stavridis
30 May; 19:30	Report	Sukno 3	Goals	three players 2	Piscines Bernat Picornell, Barcelona; Referees: Margeta, Stavridis

2014-15 Champions League
Champions

8th title

Stefano Tempesti, Andrija Prlainović, Maro Joković, Pietro Figlioli, Alex Giorgetti, Duško Pijetlović, Massimo Giacoppo, Matteo Aicardi, Francesco Di Fulvio, Filip Filipović, Aleksandar Ivović, Niccolò Gitto, Giacomo Pastorino
Head coach
Igor Milanović

=== Final standings ===
	Team
	(Italy) Pro Recco
Silver medal	(Croatia) Primorje
Bronze medal	(Spain) Atlètic-Barceloneta
	(Croatia) Jug Dubrovnik
	(Hungary) Eger
	(Hungary) Szolnok

=== Awards ===
Player of the Season	Top Scorer	Player of the Final Six
(Croatia) Sandro Sukno (Primorje Rijeka)	(Croatia) Sandro Sukno(Primorje Rijeka) 34 goals	(Spain) Felipe Perrone(CN Atlètic-Barceloneta)

== See also ==
- 2014–15 LEN Euro Cup
