= Sports park Mladost =

Sports complex in Zagreb, Croatia

Coordinates: 45.7827°N 15.9443°E

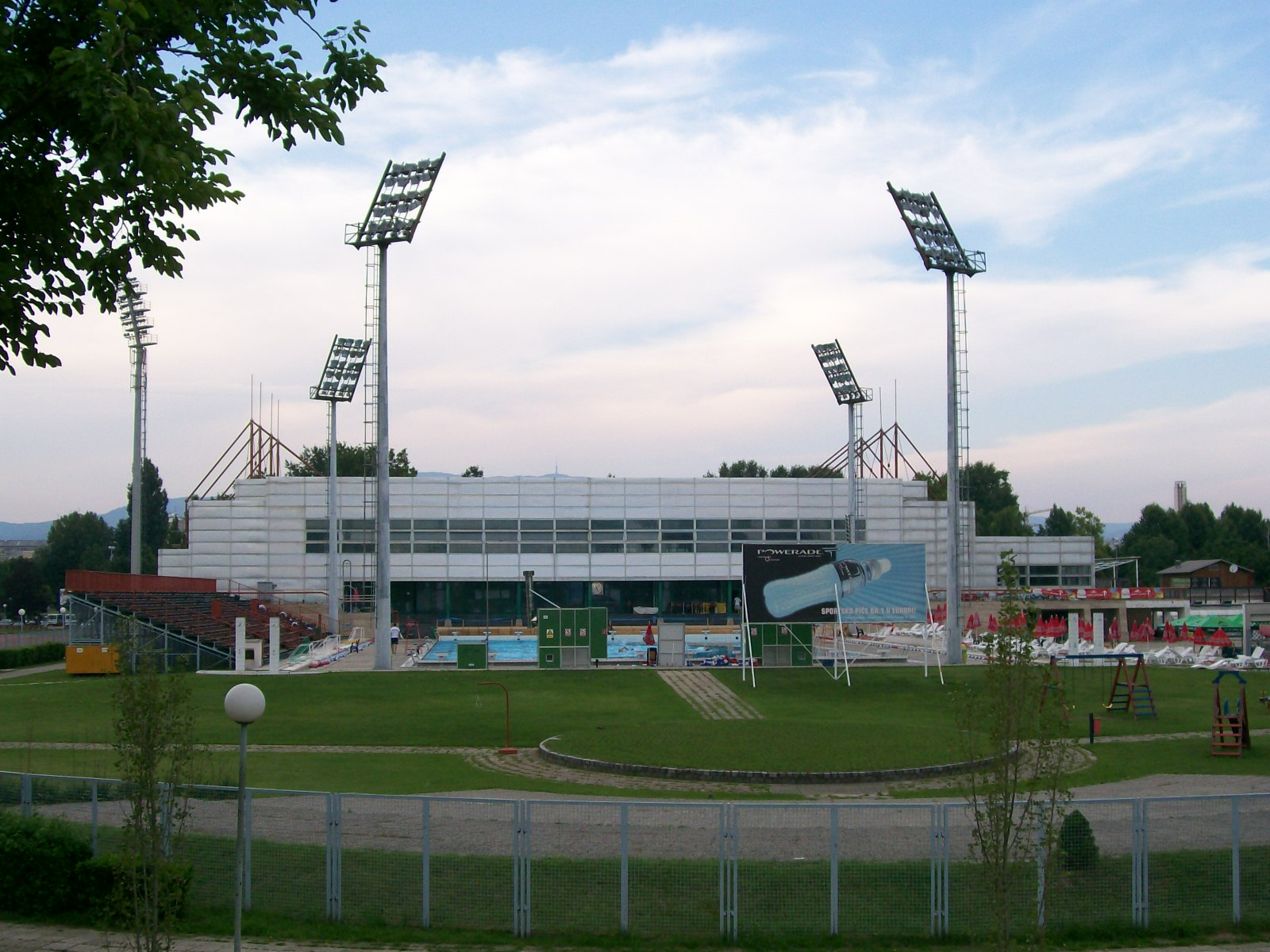
Bazeni Mladost.

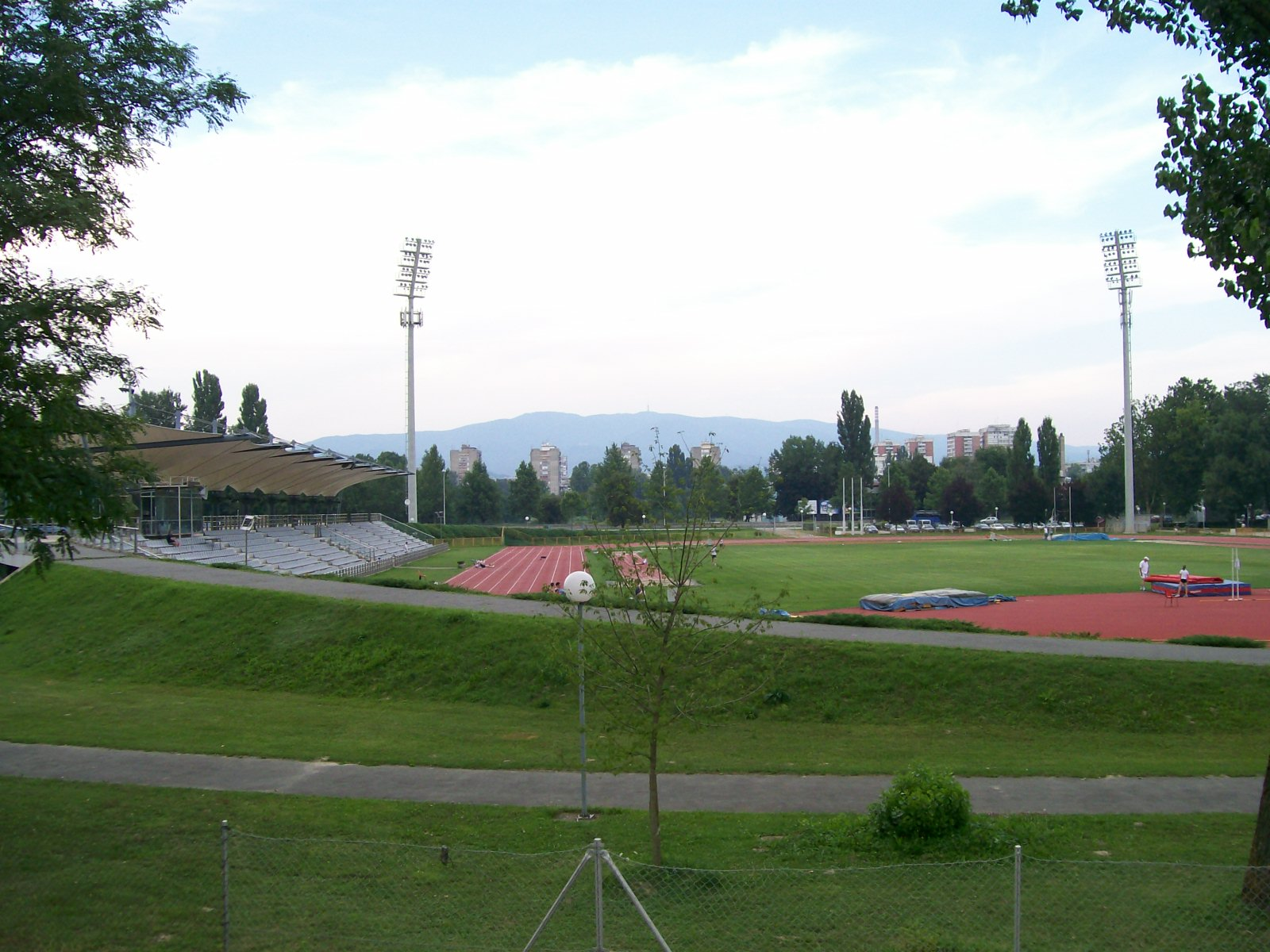
Track and field.

Sports park Mladost (lit. 'Youth Sports park'), officially Sportski park Mladost, is a multi-purpose sports complex of the City of Zagreb located along the left bank of the Sava River in Jarun neighbourhood, between the Adriatic Bridge and Jarun Lake, and in the immediate vicinity of the Faculty of Kinesiology and the Stjepan Radić Student Dormitory. Most of the facilities were built or renovated for the needs of the 1987 Summer Universiade, hosted by Zagreb. From then on, the "Mladost" is one of the most important sports facilities in the city, hosting Hanžeković Memorial as well as international competitions in several sports (Zagreb Open in tennis, two European Water Polo Championships etc.).

== Structure ==
The central object of the complex is Swimming and waterpolo centre (plivačko-vaterpolski centar), which has indoor and outdoor Olympic-size swimming pools (25×50 m), several smaller pools, children's pool, sun bathing space and other facilities. There are 16 tennis courts with grain surface, basketball, volleyball, handball, football and field hockey playgrounds, as well as athletics stadium, rugby field, martial arts and table tennis indoor venues and both fencing and indoor soccer playgrounds.

The Mladost Sports park includes:

- Bazeni Mladost ('Mladost Pools');
- Dom odbojke Bojan Stranić (Bojan Stranic Volleyball Center);
- Dom Lovro Ratković - tabble tennis and judo venues;
- 6 clay tennis courts, 8 auxiliary courts for recreational play and 2 concrete courts;
- field hockey rink (located next to the athletics stadium);
- playgrounds for indoor soccer, handball and basketball;
- athletics stadium.

== Competitions hosted ==
- 1987 Summer Universiade
- 2016 European Universities Games (co-host: Rijeka)

=== Stadion Mladost (athletics) ===
- Hanžeković Memorial
- track and field events of the 1999 Military World Games, 11-16 August 1999

=== Bazeni Mladost (aquatics) ===
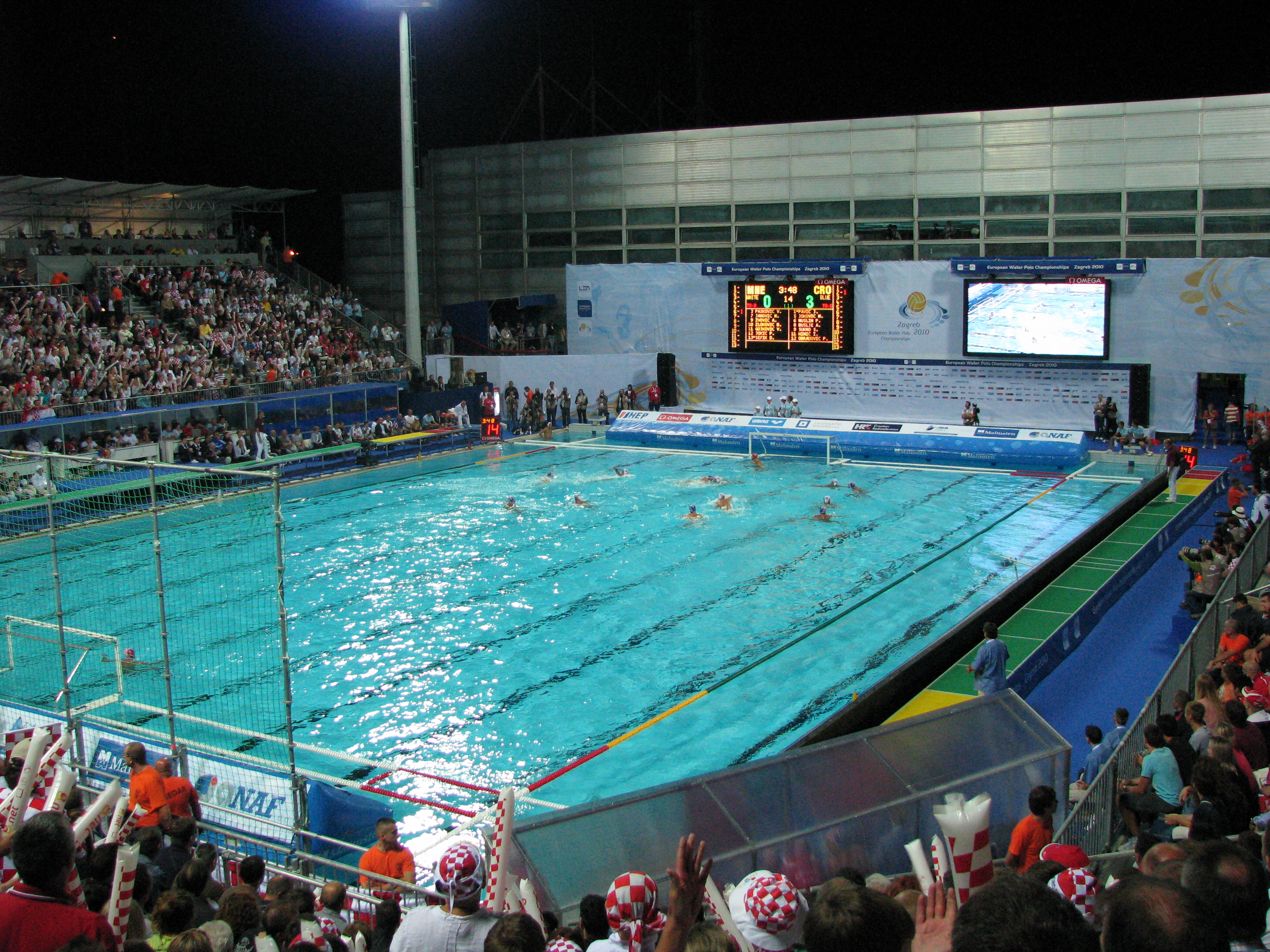
Montenegro vs. Croatia match of the 2010 Men's European Water Polo Championship.

- 2010 Men's European Water Polo Championship
- 2024 Men's European Water Polo Championship (co-host with Bazen u Gružu, Dubrovnik)
- 2026 World Aquatics Women's U16 Water Polo Championships
- 2026 World Aquatics Men's U16 Water Polo Championships

=== Tennis terrains ===
- Zagreb Open (1996-2011)
