= 2024 Men's European Water Polo Championship Qualifiers =

The tournaments for the qualification for the 2024 Men's European Water Polo Championship was held between 23 and 25 June 2023.

== Format ==
The 16 teams were split into four groups of four teams. The tournament was played at a single venue with the group winners and the three best second-ranked teams qualified for the final tournament.

== Draw ==
The draw took place on 1 April 2023.

=== Seeding ===
The seeding was announced on 29 March 2023.

Pot 1	Pot 2	Pot 3	Pot 4
Serbia; Romania; Netherlands; Germany	Malta; Slovakia; Slovenia; Lithuania	Switzerland; Turkey; Ukraine; Poland	Bulgaria; Finland; Great Britain; Portugal

== Groups ==
=== Group A ===
Pos	Team	Pld	W	D	L	GF	GA	GD	Pts	Qualification
1	Netherlands (H)	3	3	0	0	72	16	+56	9	Final tournament
2	Portugal	3	2	0	1	47	40	+7	6	
3	Poland	3	1	0	2	25	55	−30	3	
4	Lithuania	3	0	0	3	18	51	−33	0	

Source: LEN
Rules for classification: 1) points; 2) head-to-head points; 3) head-to-head goal difference; 4) head-to-head number of goals scored; 5) Goal difference.
(H) Hosts

All times are local (UTC+2).

23 June 2023; 18:30	Report	Lithuania	9–19	Portugal	Amersfoort; Referees: Andreja Stanojević (SRB), Akif Uz (TUR)
23 June 2023; 18:30	Report	Score by quarters: 4–3, 1–5, 1–5, 3–6			Amersfoort; Referees: Andreja Stanojević (SRB), Akif Uz (TUR)
23 June 2023; 18:30	Report	Vitkauskas 2	Goals	Ramos 10	Amersfoort; Referees: Andreja Stanojević (SRB), Akif Uz (TUR)

23 June 2023; 20:30	Report	Netherlands	29–5	Poland	Amersfoort
23 June 2023; 20:30	Report	Score by quarters: 5–1, 7–2, 6–0, 11–2			Amersfoort
23 June 2023; 20:30	Report	Te Riele 6	Goals	Michalski 2	Amersfoort

24 June 2023; 18:30	Report	Lithuania	7–8	Poland	Amersfoort; Referees: Andreja Stanojević (SRB), Robert Prelovský (SVK)
24 June 2023; 18:30	Report	Score by quarters: 1–2, 0–1, 4–1, 2–4			Amersfoort; Referees: Andreja Stanojević (SRB), Robert Prelovský (SVK)
24 June 2023; 18:30	Report	Jonkus 3	Goals	Michalski 3	Amersfoort; Referees: Andreja Stanojević (SRB), Robert Prelovský (SVK)

24 June 2023; 20:30	Report	Netherlands	19–9	Portugal	Amersfoort; Referees: Maxim Gerasimov (GBR), Akif Uz (TUR)
24 June 2023; 20:30	Report	Score by quarters: 2–1, 4–2, 7–3, 6–3			Amersfoort; Referees: Maxim Gerasimov (GBR), Akif Uz (TUR)
24 June 2023; 20:30	Report	Van IJperen 7	Goals	Sousa 7	Amersfoort; Referees: Maxim Gerasimov (GBR), Akif Uz (TUR)

25 June 2023; 09:30	Report	Poland	12–19	Portugal	Amersfoort
25 June 2023; 09:30	Report	Score by quarters: 3–3, 2–7, 3–5, 4–4			Amersfoort
25 June 2023; 09:30	Report	Maciejewski 4	Goals	Sousa 6	Amersfoort

25 June 2023; 11:30	Report	Netherlands	24–2	Lithuania	Amersfoort
25 June 2023; 11:30	Report	Score by quarters: 3–1, 5–0, 10–0, 6–1			Amersfoort
25 June 2023; 11:30	Report	Te Riele 6	Goals	Bakulo, Jonkus 1	Amersfoort

=== Group B ===
Pos	Team	Pld	W	D	L	GF	GA	GD	Pts	Qualification
1	Germany	3	3	0	0	56	17	+39	9	Final tournament
2	Malta (H)	3	2	0	1	46	26	+20	6	Final tournament
3	Ukraine	3	1	0	2	34	44	−10	3	
4	Bulgaria	3	0	0	3	20	69	−49	0	

Source: LEN
Rules for classification: 1) points; 2) head-to-head points; 3) head-to-head goal difference; 4) head-to-head number of goals scored; 5) Goal difference.
(H) Hosts

All times are local (UTC+2).

23 June 2023; 18:30	Report	Germany	24–3	Bulgaria	Gżira; Referees: Łukasz Król (POL), Tomas Kašėta (LTU)
23 June 2023; 18:30	Report	Score by quarters: 5–1, 9–0, 4–2, 6–0			Gżira; Referees: Łukasz Król (POL), Tomas Kašėta (LTU)
23 June 2023; 18:30	Report	Chiru 5	Goals	three players 1	Gżira; Referees: Łukasz Król (POL), Tomas Kašėta (LTU)

23 June 2023; 19:45	Report	Malta	14–7	Ukraine	Gżira; Referees: Erwin Schapers (NED), Luis Santos (POR)
23 June 2023; 19:45	Report	Score by quarters: 2–1, 3–0, 5–3, 4–3			Gżira; Referees: Erwin Schapers (NED), Luis Santos (POR)
23 June 2023; 19:45	Report	Muscat, Plumpton 3	Goals	Alieksieiev 2	Gżira; Referees: Erwin Schapers (NED), Luis Santos (POR)

24 June 2023; 18:30	Report	Bulgaria	13–23	Ukraine	Gżira; Referees: Luis Santos (POR), Łukasz Król (POL)
24 June 2023; 18:30	Report	Score by quarters: 4–5, 2–5, 2–7, 5–6			Gżira; Referees: Luis Santos (POR), Łukasz Król (POL)
24 June 2023; 18:30	Report	Metodiev 4	Goals	Diadiura 4	Gżira; Referees: Luis Santos (POR), Łukasz Król (POL)

24 June 2023; 19:45	Report	Malta	10–15	Germany	Gżira; Referees: Tomas Kašėta (LTU), Erwin Schapers (NED)
24 June 2023; 19:45	Report	Score by quarters: 2–3, 2–4, 3–2, 3–6			Gżira; Referees: Tomas Kašėta (LTU), Erwin Schapers (NED)
24 June 2023; 19:45	Report	Muscat 3	Goals	Bozic 5	Gżira; Referees: Tomas Kašėta (LTU), Erwin Schapers (NED)

25 June 2023; 09:00	Report	Malta	22–4	Bulgaria	Gżira; Referees: Łukasz Król (POL), Erwin Schapers (NED)
25 June 2023; 09:00	Report	Score by quarters: 4–0, 9–1, 3–0, 6–3			Gżira; Referees: Łukasz Król (POL), Erwin Schapers (NED)
25 June 2023; 09:00	Report	Zammit 6	Goals	four players 1	Gżira; Referees: Łukasz Król (POL), Erwin Schapers (NED)

25 June 2023; 10:15	Report	Ukraine	4–17	Germany	Gżira; Referees: Tomas Kašėta (LTU), Luis Santos (POR)
25 June 2023; 10:15	Report	Score by quarters: 1–4, 2–4, 1–6, 0–3			Gżira; Referees: Tomas Kašėta (LTU), Luis Santos (POR)
25 June 2023; 10:15	Report	Ashanin 2	Goals	Kueppers, Schipper 4	Gżira; Referees: Tomas Kašėta (LTU), Luis Santos (POR)

=== Group C ===
Pos	Team	Pld	W	D	L	GF	GA	GD	Pts	Qualification
1	Serbia	3	3	0	0	59	12	+47	9	Final tournament
2	Slovakia	3	2	0	1	36	28	+8	6	Final tournament
3	Turkey (H)	3	1	0	2	29	29	0	3	
4	Great Britain	3	0	0	3	9	64	−55	0	

Source: LEN
Rules for classification: 1) points; 2) head-to-head points; 3) head-to-head goal difference; 4) head-to-head number of goals scored; 5) Goal difference.
(H) Hosts

All times are local (UTC+3).

23 June 2023; 17:00	Report	Turkey	6–11	Slovakia	Istanbul; Referees: Alexandru Mustață (ROU), Tomi Kavčič (SLO)
23 June 2023; 17:00	Report	Score by quarters: 3–1, 1–3, 2–3, 0–4			Istanbul; Referees: Alexandru Mustață (ROU), Tomi Kavčič (SLO)
23 June 2023; 17:00	Report	Oğuzcan 2	Goals	Baláž, Zaťovič 3	Istanbul; Referees: Alexandru Mustață (ROU), Tomi Kavčič (SLO)

23 June 2023; 19:00	Report	Serbia	28–0	Great Britain	Istanbul; Referees: Antti Ruohonen (FIN), Ruben Garcia (SUI)
23 June 2023; 19:00	Report	Score by quarters: 6–0, 6–0, 7–0, 9–0			Istanbul; Referees: Antti Ruohonen (FIN), Ruben Garcia (SUI)
23 June 2023; 19:00	Report	Lazić 5	Goals		Istanbul; Referees: Antti Ruohonen (FIN), Ruben Garcia (SUI)

24 June 2023; 17:00	Report	Slovakia	8–15	Serbia	Istanbul; Referees: Tomi Kavčič (SLO), Ruben Garcia (SUI)
24 June 2023; 17:00	Report	Score by quarters: 2–3, 3–3, 2–4, 1–5			Istanbul; Referees: Tomi Kavčič (SLO), Ruben Garcia (SUI)
24 June 2023; 17:00	Report	Tkáč 3	Goals	Jakšić, Vučinić 3	Istanbul; Referees: Tomi Kavčič (SLO), Ruben Garcia (SUI)

24 June 2023; 19:00	Report	Great Britain	2–19	Turkey	Istanbul; Referees: Alexandru Mustață (ROU), Antti Ruohonen (FIN)
24 June 2023; 19:00	Report	Score by quarters: 0–6, 0–5, 2–3, 0–5			Istanbul; Referees: Alexandru Mustață (ROU), Antti Ruohonen (FIN)
24 June 2023; 19:00	Report	Elliot, Pratt 1	Goals	three players 3	Istanbul; Referees: Alexandru Mustață (ROU), Antti Ruohonen (FIN)

25 June 2023; 11:30	Report	Great Britain	7–17	Slovakia	Istanbul; Referees: Alexandru Mustață (ROU), Tomi Kavčič (SLO)
25 June 2023; 11:30	Report	Score by quarters: 1–5, 3–4, 2–6, 1–2			Istanbul; Referees: Alexandru Mustață (ROU), Tomi Kavčič (SLO)
25 June 2023; 11:30	Report	Paddon 4	Goals	Tkáč 6	Istanbul; Referees: Alexandru Mustață (ROU), Tomi Kavčič (SLO)

25 June 2023; 13:30	Report	Turkey	4–16	Serbia	Istanbul; Referees: Antti Ruohonen (FIN), Ruben Garcia (SUI)
25 June 2023; 13:30	Report	Score by quarters: 1–6, 0–2, 2–3, 1–5			Istanbul; Referees: Antti Ruohonen (FIN), Ruben Garcia (SUI)
25 June 2023; 13:30	Report	four players 1	Goals	Drašović 6	Istanbul; Referees: Antti Ruohonen (FIN), Ruben Garcia (SUI)

=== Group D ===
Pos	Team	Pld	W	D	L	GF	GA	GD	Pts	Qualification
1	Romania	3	2	1	0	48	25	+23	7	Final tournament
2	Slovenia (H)	3	2	1	0	46	23	+23	7	Final tournament
3	Switzerland	3	1	0	2	33	40	−7	3	
4	Finland	3	0	0	3	20	59	−39	0	

Source: LEN
Rules for classification: 1) points; 2) head-to-head points; 3) head-to-head goal difference; 4) head-to-head number of goals scored; 5) Goal difference.
(H) Hosts

All times are local (UTC+2).

23 June 2023; 19:00	Report	Switzerland	9–19	Romania	Kranj; Referees: Gernot Häntschel (GER), Ardaches Ovanezian (BUL)
23 June 2023; 19:00	Report	Score by quarters: 1–5, 2–6, 2–3, 4–5			Kranj; Referees: Gernot Häntschel (GER), Ardaches Ovanezian (BUL)
23 June 2023; 19:00	Report	three players 2	Goals	Georgescu 5	Kranj; Referees: Gernot Häntschel (GER), Ardaches Ovanezian (BUL)

23 June 2023; 20:40	Report	Slovenia	25–4	Finland	Kranj; Referees: Massimo Angileri (MLT), Vyacheslav Byelyevtsov (UKR)
23 June 2023; 20:40	Report	Score by quarters: 9–0, 4–0, 4–3, 8–1			Kranj; Referees: Massimo Angileri (MLT), Vyacheslav Byelyevtsov (UKR)
23 June 2023; 20:40	Report	Kadivec 6	Goals	Olilla 2	Kranj; Referees: Massimo Angileri (MLT), Vyacheslav Byelyevtsov (UKR)

24 June 2023; 19:00	Report	Finland	6–19	Romania	Kranj; Referees: Ardaches Ovanezian (BUL), Vyacheslav Byelyevtsov (UKR)
24 June 2023; 19:00	Report	Score by quarters: 1–5, 3–7, 0–2, 2–5			Kranj; Referees: Ardaches Ovanezian (BUL), Vyacheslav Byelyevtsov (UKR)
24 June 2023; 19:00	Report	Johnsson 3	Goals	Vancsik 4	Kranj; Referees: Ardaches Ovanezian (BUL), Vyacheslav Byelyevtsov (UKR)

24 June 2023; 20:40	Report	Slovenia	11–9	Switzerland	Kranj; Referees: Gernot Häntschel (GER), Massimo Angileri (MLT)
24 June 2023; 20:40	Report	Score by quarters: 3–1, 2–2, 2–3, 4–3			Kranj; Referees: Gernot Häntschel (GER), Massimo Angileri (MLT)
24 June 2023; 20:40	Report	Kadivec 5	Goals	Pleyer, Szer 3	Kranj; Referees: Gernot Häntschel (GER), Massimo Angileri (MLT)

25 June 2023; 09:30	Report	Switzerland	15–10	Finland	Kranj; Referees: Massimo Angileri (MLT), Gernot Häntschel (GER)
25 June 2023; 09:30	Report	Score by quarters: 3–2, 5–4, 4–1, 3–3			Kranj; Referees: Massimo Angileri (MLT), Gernot Häntschel (GER)
25 June 2023; 09:30	Report	Pleyer 6	Goals	Olilla 4	Kranj; Referees: Massimo Angileri (MLT), Gernot Häntschel (GER)

25 June 2023; 11:10	Report	Slovenia	10–10	Romania	Kranj; Referees: Ardaches Ovanezian (BUL), Vyacheslav Byelyevtsov (UKR)
25 June 2023; 11:10	Report	Score by quarters: 3–3, 1–3, 3–3, 3–1			Kranj; Referees: Ardaches Ovanezian (BUL), Vyacheslav Byelyevtsov (UKR)
25 June 2023; 11:10	Report	Kadivec 3	Goals	Fulea 4	Kranj; Referees: Ardaches Ovanezian (BUL), Vyacheslav Byelyevtsov (UKR)

=== Ranking of second-placed teams ===
Pos	Grp	Team	Pld	W	D	L	GF	GA	GD	Pts	Qualification
1	D	Slovenia	3	2	1	0	46	23	+23	7	Final tournament
2	B	Malta	3	2	0	1	46	26	+20	6	Final tournament
3	C	Slovakia	3	2	0	1	36	28	+8	6	Final tournament
4	A	Portugal	3	2	0	1	47	40	+7	6	

Source: LEN
Rules for classification: 1) points; 2) goal difference; 3) number of goals scored.

== See also ==
- 2024 Women's European Water Polo Championship Qualifiers
