= Marko Radulović (water polo) =

Serbian water polo player

Personal information
- Nationality: Croatian / Serbian
- Born: 6 January 2001 (age 25) Rijeka, Croatia
- Height: 1.94 m (6 ft 4 in)
- Weight: 94 kg (207 lb)

Sport
- Sport: Water polo
- Current club: CN Posillipo

Senior clubs
- Years: Team
- 2016–2018: Primorje
- 2018–2019: Vojvodina
- 2019–2020: Šabac
- 2020–2023: Radnički
- 2023–2024: Novi Beograd
- 2024-: Posillipo

Marko Radulović (Serbian Cyrillic: Марко Радуловић; born 6 January 2001) is a Serbian professional water polo player for Novi Beograd. He is 1.94 metres (6.4 ft) tall and weighs 94 kilograms (207 lb).

== Career ==
He began playing with youth categories of VK Primorje and made senior club debut at the age of 15. He stayed with the club for two seasons since then. In October 2018, he moved to the Serbian club Vojvodina. In the summer of 2020, he moved to Radnički. In the beginning of 2023 he transferred to VK Novi Beograd.

== International career ==
After playing with the youth categories of the Croatia men's national water polo team, in October 2020 he decided to move to the Serbia men's national water polo team.
