= Bazen u Gružu =

Olympic pool in Dubrovnik, Croatia

City Swimming Pool Gruž
- Gradski bazen u Gružu
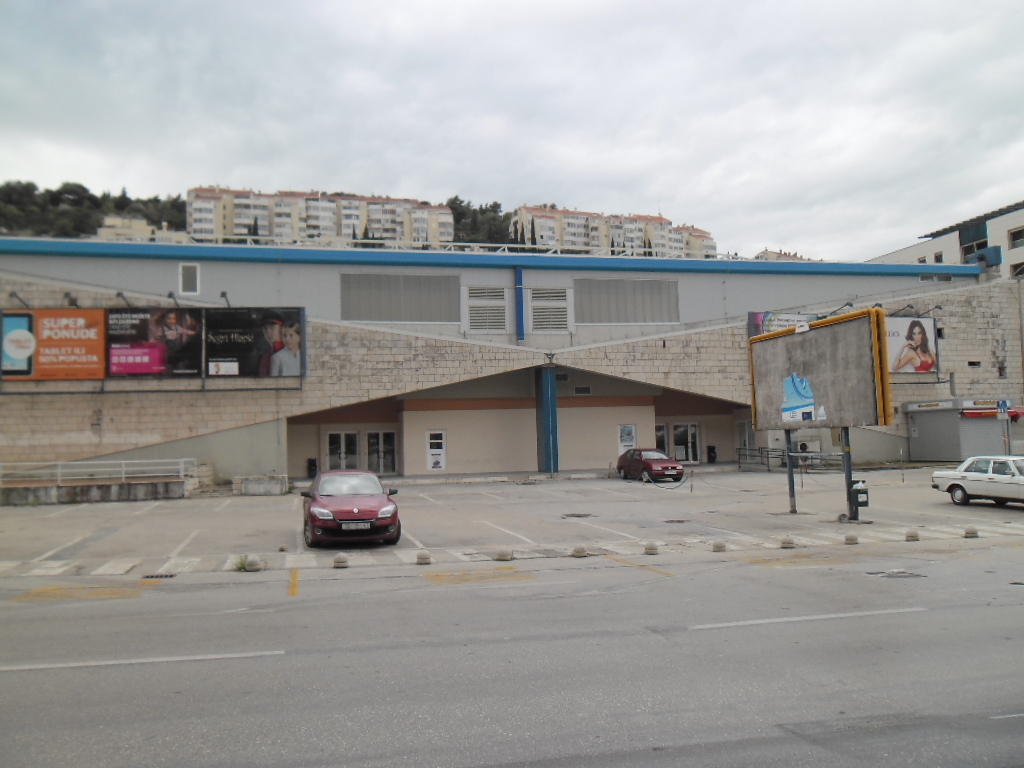
- Swimming Pool Gruž from outside, November 2013

- Location within Croatia
- Location: Dubrovnik, Croatia
- Coordinates: 42°39′06″N 18°05′23″E
- Owner: City of Dubrovnik
- Operator: Športski objekti Dubrovnik
- Capacity: 2,500 (3,000 with auxiliary stands)
- Scoreboard: Yes
- Field size: 50 × 25 m

Construction
- Opened: 4 July 1961; 65 years ago
- Renovated: 2005

Tenants
- VK Jug (1961–present); PK Jug; ŽVK Jug

City Swimming Pool Gruž (Croatian: Gradski bazen u Gružu) or Jug Swimming Pool is a swimming pool in Dubrovnik, Croatia.

Together with Bazen Mladost in Zagreb, it was venue of the 2024 Men's European Water Polo Championship.

== History ==
Gruž Swimming Pool was opened on 4 July 1961. During the 1990s, the swimming pool got a temporary roof and in 2003 the actual retractable roof was installed.

In 2019, reconstruction of the complex was announced.

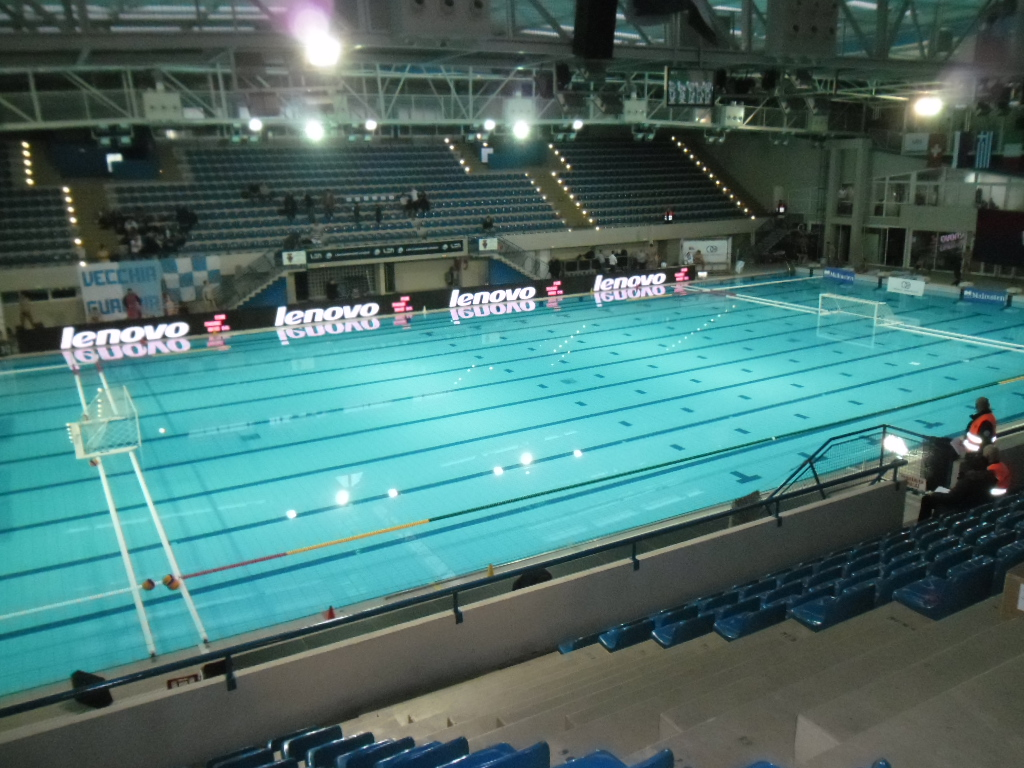
Swimming Pool in January 2014
