= LEN Champions League records and statistics =

This page details statistics of the European Cup, Euroleague and Champions League.

== General performances ==
=== By club ===
Performance in the European Cup/Euroleague/LEN Champions League by club
Club	Winners	Runners-up	Years won	Years runner-up
(Italy) Pro Recco	11	8	1965, 1984, 2003, 2007, 2008, 2010, 2012, 2015, 2021, 2022, 2023	1967, 1970, 1972, 2006, 2009, 2011, 2018, 2024
(Croatia) HAVK Mladost	7	4	1968, 1969, 1970, 1972, 1990, 1991, 1996	1971, 1993, 1997, 2000
(Serbia) Partizan	7	3	1964, 1966, 1967, 1971, 1975, 1976, 2011	1965, 1973, 1980
(West Germany) Spandau 04	4	4	1983, 1986, 1987, 1989	1981, 1982, 1988, 1990
(Croatia) Jug Dubrovnik	4	4	1981, 2001, 2006, 2016	2007, 2008, 2013, 2017
(Hungary) Ferencvarosi TC	3	1	2019, 2024, 2025	2021
(Italy) Posillipo	3	0	1997, 1998, 2005	—
(Greece) Olympiacos	2	3	2002, 2018	2001, 2016, 2019
(Hungary) Orvosegyetem	2	2	1973, 1979	1974, 1975
(Hungary) Vasas	2	1	1980, 1985	1976
(Croatia) Jadran Split	2	0	1992, 1993	—
(Hungary) Honvéd	1	3	2004	2002, 2003, 2005
(Soviet Union) CSKA Moscow	1	2	1977	1978, 1985
(Hungary) Újpest	1	2	1994	1995, 1996
(Spain) Catalunya	1	2	1995	1989, 1994
(Italy) Canottieri Napoli	1	1	1978	1991
(Italy) Pescara	1	1	1988	1998
(Serbia and Montenegro) Bečej	1	1	2000	1999
(Montenegro) Primorac Kotor	1	1	2009	2010
(Hungary) FTC Telekom Budapest	1	1	2019	2021
(Soviet Union) MGU Moscow	1	0	1974	—
(Spain) Barcelona	1	0	1982	—
(Croatia) POŠK	1	0	1999	—
(Serbia) Crvena zvezda	1	0	2013	—
(Spain) Atlètic-Barceloneta	1	0	2014	—
(Hungary) Szolnok	1	0	2017	—
(Soviet Union) Dynamo Moscow	0	3	—	1964, 1969, 1987
(Croatia) Primorje Rijeka	0	2	—	2012, 2015
(East Germany) Magdeburg	0	1	—	1966
(Romania) Dinamo Bucureşti	0	1	—	1968
(Netherlands) Zian	0	1	—	1977
(Spain) Montjuïc	0	1	—	1979
(Soviet Union) Dynamo Alma-Ata	0	1	—	1983
(Netherlands) Alphen ZC	0	1	—	1984
(Hungary) BVSC	0	1	—	1986
(Italy) Savona	0	1	—	1992
(Serbia and Montenegro) Jadran Herceg Novi	0	1	—	2004
(Serbia) Radnički Kragujevac	0	1	—	2014
(Serbia) Novi Beograd	0	1	—	2022

=== By nation ===
Country	Winners	Runners-up	Winning clubs	Runners-up
Italy	15	10	Pro Recco (10), Posillipo (3), Canottieri Napoli (1), Pescara (1)	Pro Recco (7), Canottieri Napoli (1), Savona (1), Pescara (1)
Yugoslavia ^{[A]}	14	6	Partizan (6), HAVK Mladost (6), Jug Dubrovnik (1), Bečej (1)	Partizan (3), HAVK Mladost (1), Bečej (1), Jadran Herceg Novi (1)
Hungary	8	9	Orvosegyetem (2), Vasas (2), Újpest (1), Honvéd (1), Szolnok (1), FTC (1)	Honvéd (3), Orvosegyetem (2), Újpest (2), Vasas (1), Budapesti VSC (1)
Croatia	7	9	Jadran Split (2), Jug Dubrovnik (3), HAVK Mladost (1), POŠK Split (1)	Jug Dubrovnik (4), HAVK Mladost (3), Primorje Rijeka (2)
Germany	4	4	Spandau 04 (4)	Spandau 04 (4)
Serbia	2	2	Partizan (1), Crvena zvezda (1)	Radnički Kragujevac (1), Novi Beograd (1)
Spain	3	3	Barcelona (1), Catalunya (1), Atlètic-Barceloneta (1)	Catalunya (2), Montjuïc (1)
Soviet Union ^{[B]}	2	6	MGU Moscow (1), CSKA Moscow (1)	Dynamo Moscow (3), CSKA Moscow (2), Dynamo Alma-Ata (1)
Greece	2	3	Olympiacos (2)	Olympiacos (3)
Montenegro	1	1	Primorac Kotor (1)	Primorac Kotor (1)
Netherlands	0	2	—	Zian (1), Alphen (1)
East Germany	0	1	—	Magdeburg (1)
Romania	0	1	—	Dinamo București (1)

==== Notes ====
- ^{A} Results until the Breakup of Yugoslavia in early 1990s. Clubs from present day Serbia won the title six times and were runners-up additional three times, clubs from present day Croatia won the title seventh and were runners-up once times.
- ^{B} Results until the Dissolution of the Soviet Union in 1991. Clubs from present day Russia won the title two times and were runners-up additional five times, clubs from present day Kazakhstan were runners-up once times.

=== By city ===
City	Winners	Runners-up	Winning clubs	Runners-up
(Italy) Recco	10	7	Pro Recco (10)	Pro Recco (7)
(Serbia) Belgrade	8	4	Partizan (7), Crvena zvezda (1)	Partizan (3), Novi Beograd (1)
(Hungary) Budapest	7	9	Orvosegyetem (2), Vasas (2), Újpest (1), Honvéd (1), FTC (1)	Honvéd (3), Orvosegyetem (2), Újpest (2), Vasas (1), Budapesti VSC (1)
(Croatia) Zagreb	7	4	HAVK Mladost (7)	HAVK Mladost (4)
(Germany) Berlin	4	4	Spandau 04 (4)	Spandau 04 (4)
(Croatia) Dubrovnik	4	4	Jug Dubrovnik (4)	Jug Dubrovnik (4)
(Italy) Naples	4	1	Posillipo (3), Canottieri Napoli (1)	Canottieri Napoli (1)
(Spain) Barcelona	3	3	Barcelona (1), Catalunya (1), Atlètic-Barceloneta (1)	Catalunya (2), Montjuïc (1)
(Croatia) Split	3	0	Jadran Split (2), POŠK Split (1)	—
(Russia) Moscow	2	5	MGU Moscow (1), CSKA Moscow (1)	Dynamo Moscow (3), CSKA Moscow (2)
(Greece) Piraeus	2	3	Olympiacos (2)	Olympiacos (3)
(Italy) Pescara	1	1	Pescara (1)	Pescara (1)
(Serbia) Bečej	1	1	Bečej (1)	Bečej (1)
(Montenegro) Kotor	1	1	Primorac Kotor (1)	Primorac Kotor (1)
(Hungary) Szolnok	1	0	Szolnok (1)	—
(Germany) Magdeburg	0	1	—	Magdeburg (1)
(Romania) București	0	1	—	Dinamo București (1)
(Netherlands) The Hague	0	1	—	Zian (1)
(Kazakhstan) Almaty	0	1	—	Dynamo Alma-Ata (1)
(Netherlands) Alphen aan den Rijn	0	1	—	Alphen (1)
(Italy) Savona	0	1	—	Savona (1)
(Montenegro) Herceg Novi	0	1	—	Jadran Herceg Novi (1)
(Serbia) Kragujevac	0	1	—	Radnički Kragujevac (1)

== Clubs ==
=== By semi-final appearances (European Cup, Euroleague and LEN Champions League) ===
Team	No. of Appearances	Years in Semi-finals
(Italy) Pro Recco	27	**1965**, 1966, **1967**, 1968, **1970**, **1972**, 1979, 1983, **1984**, **2003**, 2005, **2006**, **2007**, **2008**, **2009**, **2010**, **2011**, **2012**, **2015**, 2016, 2017, **2018**, 2019, **2021**, **2022**, **2023**, **2024**
(Serbia) Partizan	21	**1964**, **1965**, **1966**, **1967**, 1969, **1971**, **1973**, 1974, **1975**, **1976**, 1977, 1978, **1980**, 1985, 1988, 1989, 2007, 2010, **2011**, 2013, 2014
(Croatia) HAVK Mladost	18	**1968**, **1969**, **1970**, **1971**, **1972**, **1990**, **1991**, **1993**, 1995, **1996**, **1997**, 1998, **2000**, 2003, 2008, 2009, 2011, 2012
(Croatia) Jug Dubrovnik	16	**1981**, 1984, 1986, **2001**, 2002, 2005, **2006**, **2007**, **2008**, 2009, 2010, **2013**, 2015, **2016**, **2017**, 2018
(Germany) Spandau 04	15	1980, **1981**, **1982**, **1983**, 1984, 1985, **1986**, **1987**, **1988**, **1989**, **1990**, 1991, 1992, 1995, 2003
(Soviet Union) CSKA Moscow	10	1965, 1966, 1968, 1972, 1973, **1977**, **1978**, **1985**, 1990, 1991
(Hungary) Vasas	9	**1976**, **1980**, 1981, 1982, 1983, **1985**, 1990, 2008, 2012
(Italy) Posillipo	9	1994, 1996, **1997**, **1998**, 1999, 2001, 2002, **2005**, 2006
(Spain) Barceloneta	8	2013, **2014**, 2015, 2018, 2019, 2021, 2023, 2025
(Greece) Olympiacos	7	**2001**, **2002**, 2007, **2016**, **2018**, **2019**, 2024
(Russia) Dynamo Moscow	5	**1964**, **1969**, 1971, **1987**, 1999
(East Germany) Magdeburg	5	1964, 1965, **1966**, 1967, 1969
(Romania) Dinamo București	5	1967, **1968**, 1973, 1975, 1988
(Hungary) Orvosegyetem	5	1970, **1973**, **1974**, **1975**, **1979**
(Spain) Barcelona	4	1970, **1982**, 1996, 1997
(Italy) Canottieri Napoli	4	1974, 1976, **1978**, **1991**
(Hungary) Újpest	4	1987, **1994**, **1995**, **1996**
(Serbia and Montenegro) Bečej	4	1997, **1999**, **2000**, 2001
(Hungary) Honvéd	4	**2002**, **2003**, **2004**, **2005**
(Croatia) Primorje Rijeka	4	2004, **2012**, 2014, **2015**
(Netherlands) De Robben	3	1972, 1975, 1976
(West Germany) Würzburg 05	3	1977, 1978, 1979
(Spain) Montjuïc	3	**1979**, 1980, 1986
(Montenegro) Primorac Kotor	3	1987, **2009**, **2010**
(Spain) Catalunya	3	**1989**, **1994**, **1995**
(Croatia) Jadran Split	3	**1992**, **1993**, 1994
(Netherlands) Alphen	2	1982, **1984**
(Hungary) Budapesti VSC	2	**1986**, 2000
(Italy) Pescara	2	**1988**, **1998**
(Italy) Savona	2	**1992**, 2006
(Netherlands) Polar Bears Ede	2	1992, 1993
(Croatia) POŠK Split	2	**1999**, 2000
(Hungary) Szolnok	2	2016, **2017**
(West Germany) Duisburg	1	1964
(Sweden) SKK Stockholm	1	1971
(Soviet Union) MGU Moscow	1	**1974**
(Netherlands) Zian	1	**1977**
(Greece) Ethnikos	1	1981
(Soviet Union) Dynamo Alma-Ata	1	**1983**
(Hungary) Ferencváros	1	1989
(France) Olympic Nice	1	1993
(Russia) Spartak Volgograd	1	1998
(Serbia and Montenegro) Jadran Herceg Novi	1	**2004**
(Russia) Shturm Chekhov	1	2004
(Montenegro) Budva	1	2011
(Serbia) Crvena zvezda	1	**2013**
(Serbia) Radnički Kragujevac	1	**2014**
(Hungary) Eger	1	2017
(Hungary) FTC	1	**2019**
Team in Bold:		Finalist team in season

=== All-time table for semi-finalists and clubs with at least 10 participations in the main tournament ===
As of the end of the 2025/26 season
Defunct clubs
Wins/Defeats after penalty shootout counted as draws.
Top4 appearances in brackets denote finishes in the top 4 out of total, when group stage was played to determine the winner.
Total participations - includes unsuccessful participations in qualifications for the main tournament in addition to participations in the main tournament.
Season 2019/20 in statistic of the 'main tournament' is ONLY included in 'participations' column, because teams did not play an equal number of games in the group stage.

Country	Team	Main tournament												Total (Main + Qual.)					Qualifications	
Country	Team	Part.	F	Top4	Pld	W	D	L	Wins		Defeats		1st Ssn	Tot. Part.	Pld	W	D	L	Qualifications	
Country	Team	Part.	F	Top4	Pld	W	D	L	BGD	MGS	BGD	MGC	1st Ssn	Tot. Part.	Pld	W	D	L	Ent.	Q
(Netherlands) NED	Alphen	9	1	2(1)	44	10	3	31					1977/78							
(Spain) ESP	Barcelona	20	1	4(1)	81	25	8	48					1963/64							
(Spain) ESP	Barceloneta	25	2	9	245	135	30	77					1970/71							
(Serbia) SRB	Bečej	6	2	4	56	35	4	17					1996/97							
(Italy) ITA	Brescia	16	0	2	168	78	19	71					2004/05							
(Montenegro) MNE	Budva	4	0	1	36	14	2	20					2008/09							
(Hungary) HUN	BVSC	8	1	2	53	25	8	20					1966/67							
(Italy) ITA	Canottieri Napoli	5	2	4(3)	31	15	2	14					1963/64							
(Spain) ESP	Catalunya	6	3	3	31	13	7	11					1988/89							
(Serbia) SRB	Crvena zvezda	4	1	1	48	13	3	32					2012/13							
(Russia) RUS	CSK VMF Moscow	13	3	10(5)	62	29	14	19					1964/65							
(Netherlands) NED	De Robben	8	0	3(3)	35	10	1	24					1967/68							
(Romania) ROM	Dinamo București	11	1	5(2)	46	19	3	24					1964/65							
(Germany) GER	Duisburg	2	0	1(1)	8	2	0	6					1963/64							
(Kazakhstan) KAZ	Dynamo Alma-Ata	1	1	1(1)	3	2	0	1					1982/83							
(Germany) GER	Dynamo Magdeburg	5	1	5(2)	29	13	4	12					1963/64							
(Russia) RUS	Dynamo Moscow	11	3	5(2)	83	43	7	33					1963/64							
(Hungary) HUN	Eger	12	0	1	122	47	14	61					2006/07							
(Greece) GRE	Ethnikos Piraeus	15	0	1(1)	54	8	6	40	+16	19	–17	–24	1963/64	27	156	60	12	84		
(Hungary) HUN	Ferencváros	11	4	9	122	82	12	28					1963/64; 1965/66							
(Hungary) HUN	Honvéd	8	4	4	70	42	5	23					2001/02							
(Montenegro) MNE	Jadran Herceg Novi	15	1	1	119	39	16	64					2003/04							
(Croatia) CRO	Jadran Split	10	2	3	88	30	7	51					1991/92							
(Croatia) CRO	Jug	28	8	16(1)	277	166	31	80					1980/81							
(Slovakia) SVK	Košice	11	0	0	33	5	2	26					1971/72							
(France) FRA	Marseille	21	0	1	137	45	4	88					1968/69							
(Russia) RUS	MGU Moscow	2	1	1(1)	10	7	2	1					1973/74							
(Croatia) CRO	Mladost	27	11	18(2)	207	115	22	70					1967/68							
(Spain) ESP	Montjuïc	3	1	3(2)	17	6	4	7					1978/79							
(Serbia) SRB	Novi Beograd	5	3	4	74	46	9	19					2021/22							
(Greece) GRE	Olympiakos	32	5	8	286	142	37	107					1969/70							
(France) FRA	Olympic Nice	11	0	1	76	17	6	53					1992/93							
(Hungary) HUN	OSC	12	4	5(4)	94	41	10	43					1969/70							
(Serbia) SRB	Partizan	34	10	21(10)	259	142	29	88					1963/64							
(Italy) ITA	Pescara	4	2	2	18	10	2	6					1987/88							
(Netherlands) NED	Polar Bears Ede	3	0	2	10	5	1	4					1990/91							
(Italy) ITA	Posillipo	16	3	9	102	62	7	33					1985/86							
(Croatia) CRO	POŠK	2	1	2	25	20	1	4					1998/99							
(Montenegro) MNE	Primorac	8	2	3	59	32	7	20					1986/87							
(Croatia) CRO	Primorje	7	2	4	72	41	9	22					2003/04							
(Italy) ITA	Pro Recco	33	20	28(3)	311	246	19	46					1964/65							
(Serbia) SRB	Radnički Kragujevac	6	1	1	62	27	6	29					2013/14							
(Italy) ITA	Savona	4	1	2	30	15	2	13					1991/92							
(Germany) GER	Spandau 04	37	8	15(3)	276	93	31	152					1979/80							
(Russia) RUS	Shturm	5	0	1	34	8	6	20					2003/04							
(Sweden) SWE	SKK Stockholm	6	0	1(1)	23	4	1	18					1969/70							
(Russia) RUS	Spartak Volgograd	9	0	1	62	27	7	28					1997/98							
(Hungary) HUN	Szolnok	7	1	2	71	47	6	18					1964/65							
(Hungary) HUN	Újpest	4	3	3	23	11	5	7					1986/87							
(Hungary) HUN	Vasas	21	3	9(4)	138	62	20	56					1975/76							
(Greece) GRE	Vouliagmeni	7	0	1	60	24	3	33					1991/92							
(Germany) GER	Würzburg 05	4	0	3(3)	21	10	0	11					1974/75							
(Netherlands) NED	Zian	1	1	1(1)	6	3	1	2					1976/77							

=== Euroleague and LEN Champions League Final4, Final6, Final8 ===
The history of the LEN Champions League (Euroleague) Final Four system, which was permanently introduced in the 1996–97 season.

==== By season ====
Final4

Season	1st Place	2nd Place	3rd Place	4th Place
1996–97	(Italy) Posillipo	(Croatia) HAVK Mladost	(Spain) Barcelona	(Serbia and Montenegro) Bečej
1997–98	(Italy) Posillipo	(Italy) Pescara	(Croatia) HAVK Mladost	(Russia) Spartak Volgograd
1998–99	(Croatia) POŠK Split	(Serbia and Montenegro) Bečej	(Russia) Dynamo Moscow	(Italy) Posillipo
1999–00	(Serbia and Montenegro) Bečej	(Croatia) HAVK Mladost	(Hungary) Budapesti VSC	(Croatia) POŠK Split
2000–01	(Croatia) Jug Dubrovnik	(Greece) Olympiacos	(Italy) Posillipo	(Serbia and Montenegro) Bečej
2001–02	(Greece) Olympiacos	(Hungary) Honvéd	(Italy) Posillipo	(Croatia) Jug Dubrovnik
2002–03	(Italy) Pro Recco	(Hungary) Honvéd	(Croatia) HAVK Mladost	(Germany) Spandau 04
2003–04	(Hungary) Honvéd	(Serbia and Montenegro) Jadran Herceg Novi	(Croatia) Primorje Rijeka	(Russia) Shturm Chekhov
2004–05	(Italy) Posillipo	(Hungary) Honvéd	(Italy) Pro Recco	(Croatia) Jug Dubrovnik
2005–06	(Croatia) Jug Dubrovnik	(Italy) Pro Recco	(Italy) Posillipo	(Italy) Savona
2006–07	(Italy) Pro Recco	(Croatia) Jug Dubrovnik	(Serbia) Partizan	(Greece) Olympiacos
2007–08	(Italy) Pro Recco	(Croatia) Jug Dubrovnik	(Hungary) Vasas	(Croatia) HAVK Mladost
2008–09	(Montenegro) Primorac Kotor	(Italy) Pro Recco	(Croatia) Jug Dubrovnik	(Croatia) HAVK Mladost
2009–10	(Italy) Pro Recco	(Montenegro) Primorac Kotor	(Serbia) Partizan	(Croatia) Jug Dubrovnik
2010–11	(Serbia) Partizan	(Italy) Pro Recco	(Croatia) HAVK Mladost	(Montenegro) Budva
2011–12	(Italy) Pro Recco	(Croatia) Primorje Rijeka	(Croatia) HAVK Mladost	(Hungary) Vasas
2012–13	(Serbia) Crvena zvezda	(Croatia) Jug Dubrovnik	(Spain) CNA Barceloneta	(Serbia) Partizan

Final6

Season	1st Place	2nd Place	3rd Place	4th Place	5th Place	6th Place
2013–14	(Spain) CNA Barceloneta	(Serbia) Radnički Kragujevac	(Croatia) Primorje Rijeka	(Serbia) Partizan	(Italy) Brescia	(Italy) Pro Recco
2014–15	(Italy) Pro Recco	(Croatia) Primorje Rijeka	(Spain) CNA Barceloneta	(Croatia) Jug Dubrovnik	(Hungary) Egrer	(Hungary) Szolnok
2015–16	(Croatia) Jug Dubrovnik	(Greece) Olympiacos	(Hungary) Szolnok	(Italy) Pro Recco	(Spain) CNA Barceloneta	(Hungary) Egrer
2016–17	(Hungary) Szolnok	(Croatia) Jug Dubrovnik	(Italy) Pro Recco	(Hungary) Egrer	(Italy) Brescia	(Greece) Olympiacos

Final8

Season	1st Place	2nd Place	3rd Place	4th Place	5th Place	6th Place	7th Place	8th Place
2017–18	(Greece) Olympiacos	(Italy) Pro Recco	(Spain) CNA Barceloneta	(Croatia) Jug CO	(Hungary) Szolnoki VSC	(Hungary) ZF Eger	(Italy) AN Brescia	(Germany) Spandau 04
2018–19	(Hungary) FTC Telekom Budapest	(Greece) Olympiacos	(Italy) Pro Recco	(Spain) CNA Barceloneta	(Italy) AN Brescia	(Croatia) Jug CO	(Italy) BPM Sport Management	(Germany) Waspo 98 Hannover

=== Countries ===
- Only on three occasions has the final of the tournament involved two teams from the same country:
  - 1971 Yugoslavia: Partizan vs HAVK Mladost 4–4
  - 1993 Croatia: Jadran Split vs HAVK Mladost 13–12 (7–8, 6–4)
  - 1998 Italy: Posillipo vs Pescara 8–6
- The country providing the highest number of wins is Yugoslavia with 13 victories, shared by two teams, Partizan (6), HAVK Mladost (6) and Jug Dubrovnik (1)

=== Country representation in the main tournament ===
Qualifications not included.

Country	Debut	Part.	Clubs	
Country	Debut	Part.	No.	List with debut ssn
(Austria) AUT	1963/64			
(Belarus) BLR	2012/13			
(Belgium) BEL	1963/64			
(Bulgaria) BUL	1963/64			
(Croatia) CRO	1967/68			
(Denmark) DEN	1979/80			
(France) FRA	1963/64			
(Georgia (country)) GEO	2012/13			
(Germany) GER	1963/64			
(United Kingdom) GBR	1971/72			
(Greece) GRE	1963/64			
(Hungary) HUN	1964/65			
(Italy) ITA	1963/64			
(Kazakhstan) KAZ	1982/83			
(Malta) MLT	2001/02			
(Montenegro) MNE	1986/87			
(Netherlands) NED	1963/64			
(Poland) POL	1963/64			
(Romania) ROM	1963/64			
(Russia) RUS	1963/64			
(Serbia) SRB	1963/64			
(Slovakia) SVK	1971/72			
(Slovenia) SLO	1998/99			
(Spain) ESP	1964/65			
(Sweden) SWE	1966/67			
(Switzerland) SUI	1977/78			
(Turkey) TUR	1975/76			
(Ukraine) UKR	1998/99			
