= Orvosegyetem SC =

Hungarian water polo club from Budapest

Genesys OSC-Újbuda
- Full name: Orvosegyetem Sport Club
- Short name: OSC
- Founded: 1961; 65 years ago (re-founded in 2006)
- League: Országos Bajnokság I
- Based in: Budapest, Hungary
- Arena: Nyéki Imre uszoda
- Colors: Blue and white
- President: Dr. Konrád Mária
- Head coach: Dániel Varga
- Championships: 2 European Cup; 1 LEN Super Cup; 7 Hungarian Championships; 2 Hungarian Cups
- 2021–22: Országos Bajnokság I, 2nd of 14
- Website: oscwaterpolo.hu

Orvosegyetem Sport Club is a Hungarian professional water polo club from Budapest established in 1957 in the Semmelweis University.

The club's peak was the 1970s. Orvosegyetem won six national championships in a row between 1969 and 1974, and in 1973 it won the European Cup, beating 4-times champion Partizan Belgrade in the final. In 1974 and 1975 also reached the European Cup's final, but lost to MGU Moscow and Partizan respectively. In 1976 it played its fourth European final, losing the Cup Winners' Cup to Mladost Zagreb. In 1978 and 1979 the team culminated its golden era winning its seventh national championship and its second European Cup. The team declined in subsequent years, but it still played in the Hungarian First Championship.

However, with the team moving to XI. district in Budapest, and with the new title sponsor, A-HÍD Zrt. from the 2014–15 season was a very successful one, winning silver medal in both the Hungarian Cup and the Hungarian Championship, whilst also going three rounds in the LEN Champions League qualifiers before falling out against Szolnoki VSC.

== Naming history ==
- Orvosegyetem Sport Club (OSC): (1961 – 1978)
- Medicor-OSC: (1979 – 1985/86)
- OSC: (1986/87 – 1989/90)
- OSC-Boniper (1990/91 – 1991/92)
- OSC: (1992/93 – 1999/00)
- OSC-British Knights: (2000/01 – 2004/05)
- OSC-Kaposvár: (2005/06) - Merged with Kaposvári VK
- OSC-Opus Via: (2006/07 – 2008/09)
- OSC: (2009/10 – 2013/14)
- A-Híd OSC-Újbuda: (2014/15 – 2019/20)
- OSC-Újbuda: (2020/21 – 2021/22)
- Genesys OSC-Újbuda: (2021/22 – ... )

== Honours ==
=== Domestic competitions ===
- Országos Bajnokság I (National Championship of Hungary)

Champions (7): 1969, 1970, 1971, 1972, 1973, 1974, 1978
Runners-up (7): 1968, 1975, 1977, 1979, 1980, 2014–15, 2018–19, 2020–21
Third place (4): 1976, 1981, 2015–16, 2016–17

- Magyar Kupa (National Cup of Hungary)

Winners (2): 1970, 1974
Finalist (5): 1968, 1973, 1981, 2014, 2017

=== European competitions ===
- LEN Champions League (Champions Cup)

Winners (2): 1972–73, 1978–79

- LEN Cup Winners' Cup

Runners-up (1): 1975–76

- LEN Super Cup

Winners (1): 1979

== Current squad ==
Season 2020–21

No.	Nat.	Player	Birth Date	Position	L/R
1	(Hungary)	Dávid Bisztritsányi	June 7, 1987 (age 39)	Goalkeeper	R
3	(Hungary)	Miklós Gór-Nagy (c)	January 8, 1983 (age 43)	Centre back	R
5	(Hungary)	Ferenc Salamon	November 11, 1988 (age 37)	Centre back / wing	
6	(Hungary)	Gábor Kovács	April 30, 1989 (age 37)	Wing	
7	(Hungary)	Gábor Hegedüs	September 29, 1983 (age 42)	Wing	
8	(Slovakia)	Lukáš Seman	October 6, 1987 (age 38)	Centre forward	R
9	(Hungary)	Balázs Erdélyi	February 16, 1990 (age 36)	Defender	R
10	(Hungary)	Zsolt Juhász	June 8, 1985 (age 41)	Wing	
11	(Slovakia) (Hungary)	Erik Bundschuch	July 14, 1991 (age 34)	Guard	
12	(Hungary)	Balázs Hárai	April 5, 1987 (age 39)	Centre forward	R
13	(Hungary)	Márton Tóth	September 28, 1985 (age 40)	Centre forward / wing	
14	(Hungary)	Botond Barabás	July 8, 1991 (age 34)	Goalkeeper	
	(Hungary)	Balázs Szabó	May 8, 1990 (age 36)		
	(Hungary)	Krisztián Manhercz	February 6, 1997 (age 29)	Left side	R

=== Staff ===
Technical Staff
Head coach	(Hungary) Dániel Varga

- Sporting director: Péter Becsey
- Team Manager: Zoltán Menyhárt
- Youth coach: Attila Petik
- Masseur: Ákos Horváth
- Club doctor: Koppány Kocsis, MD
- Video analyst: Buza Balázs

=== Transfers (2017-18) ===
Source: vizipolo.hu

In:

- (Hungary) Balázs Erdélyi (from Eger)
- (Hungary) Marcell Kolozsi (from Pécsi VSK)
- (Serbia) Sava Ranđelović (from AN Brescia)
- (Hungary) Márton Tóth (from Ferencváros)
- (Serbia) Nemanja Ubović (from AN Brescia)

Out:

- (Hungary) Bence Bátori (to Szolnoki Dózsa)
- (Hungary) Ádám Nagy (to Miskolci VLC)
- (Hungary) Toni Német (to Ferencváros)
- (Serbia) Slobodan Nikić (to Ferencváros)
- (Hungary) Gergő Zalánki (to Szolnoki Dózsa)

== Recent seasons ==
As of 3 September 2023.

Season	Tier	League	Pos.	Domestic cup	European competitions	
1984–85	1	OB I	12th	Quarterfinalist		
1985–86	1	OB I	10th	Round of 16		
1986–87	1	OB I	13th	Round of 16		
1987–88	1	OB I	13th	Round of 16		
1988–89	1	OB I	10th	Round of 16		
1989–90	1	OB I	11th	Quarterfinalist		
1990–91	1	OB I	10th	Round of 16		
1991–92	1	OB I	10th	Round of 16		
1992–93	1	OB I	11th			
1993–94	1	OB I	12th			
1994–95	2	OB I/B	1st			
1995–96	1	OB I	11th			
1996–97	1	OB I	10th			
1997–98	1	OB I	11th			
1998–99	1	OB I	11th			
1999–00	2	OB I/B				
2000–01	1	OB I	10th	Round of 16		
2001–02	1	OB I	7th	Semifinalist		
2002–03	1	OB I	7th	Round of 16		
2003–04	1	OB I	8th	did not held		
2004–05	1	OB I	10th			
2005–06	1	OB I	11th			
2006–07	1	OB I	10th			
2007–08	1	OB I	11th			
2008–09	1	OB I	9th			
2009–10	1	OB I	10th	Preliminary round		
2010–11	1	OB I	10th	Preliminary round		
2011–12	1	OB I	10th	Preliminary round		
2012–13	1	OB I	9th	Preliminary round		
2013–14	1	OB I	11th	Preliminary round		
2014–15	1	OB I	2nd	Runner-up	1 Champions League	QR3
2015–16	1	OB I	3rd	Semifinalist	1 Champions League	PR
2016–17	1	OB I	3rd	Semifinalist	1 Champions League	PR
2017–18	1	OB I	4th	Runner-up	1 Champions League	PR
2018–19	1	OB I	2nd	Semifinalist	2 Euro Cup	SF
2019–20	1	OB I	2nd^{1}	Runner-up	1 Champions League	—^{1}
2020–21	1	OB I	2nd	did not start	1 Champions League	QR
2020–21	1	OB I	2nd	did not start	2 Euro Cup	F
2021–22	1	OB I	2nd	Semifinalist	1 Champions League	PR
2022–23	1	OB I	2nd	Runner-up	1 Champions League	PR
2023–24	1	OB I		Semifinalist	1 Champions League	

^1 Cancelled due to the COVID-19 pandemic.

=== In European competition ===
- Participations in Champions League (European Cup, Euroleague): 11x
- Participations in Euro Cup: 1x
- Participations in Cup Winners' Cup: 1x

Season	Competition	Round	Club	Home	Away	Aggregate
1969-70	European Cup	Quarter-final round	(Socialist Federal Republic of Yugoslavia) HAVK Mladost	5-6		2nd place
1969-70	European Cup	Quarter-final round	(Sweden) Stockholms KK	6-1		2nd place
1969-70	European Cup	Quarter-final round	(Netherlands) De Robben	12-3		2nd place
1969-70	European Cup	Semi-finals	(Italy) Pro Recco	5-3	6-10	11–13
1970-71	European Cup	Semi-final round	(Soviet Union) Dynamo Moscow	4-7		3rd place
1970-71	European Cup	Semi-final round	(Socialist Federal Republic of Yugoslavia) HAVK Mladost	3-6		3rd place
1970-71	European Cup	Semi-final round	(Spain) Barceloneta	6-4		3rd place
1972-73	European Cup; Champion	Semi-final round	(Soviet Union) CSKA Moscow	3-3		1st place
1972-73	European Cup; Champion	Semi-final round	(Spain) Barcelona	8-1		1st place
1972-73	European Cup; Champion	Semi-final round	(Greece) Ethnikos	9-3		1st place
1972-73	European Cup; Champion	Final round	(Socialist Federal Republic of Yugoslavia) Partizan	5–4		1st place
1972-73	European Cup; Champion	Final round	(Romania) Dinamo București	5–4		1st place
1972-73	European Cup; Champion	Final round	(Soviet Union) CSKA Moscow	4–5		1st place
1973-74	European Cup; Finalist	Semi-final round	(Italy) Canottieri Napoli	10–8		1st place
1973-74	European Cup; Finalist	Semi-final round	(Romania) Rapid București	5-3		1st place
1973-74	European Cup; Finalist	Semi-final round	(Sweden) Stockholms KK	6-1		1st place
1973-74	European Cup; Finalist	Semi-final round	(Czechoslovakia) Hornets Košice	11-6		1st place
1973-74	European Cup; Finalist	Final round	(Soviet Union) MGU Moscow	3-4		2nd place
1973-74	European Cup; Finalist	Final round	(Socialist Federal Republic of Yugoslavia) Partizan	5-4		2nd place
1973-74	European Cup; Finalist	Final round	(Italy) Canottieri Napoli	9-2		2nd place
1974-75	European Cup; Finalist	Semi-final round	(Socialist Federal Republic of Yugoslavia) Partizan	6-7		2nd place
1974-75	European Cup; Finalist	Semi-final round	(Italy) Pro Recco	7-4		2nd place
1974-75	European Cup; Finalist	Semi-final round	(West Germany) Würzburg 05	7-2		2nd place
1974-75	European Cup; Finalist	Final round	(Netherlands) De Robben	7-3		2nd place
1974-75	European Cup; Finalist	Final round	(Socialist Federal Republic of Yugoslavia) Partizan	2-6		2nd place
1974-75	European Cup; Finalist	Final round	(Romania) Dinamo București	8-6		2nd place
1975-76	Cup Winners' Cup; Finalist	Finals	(Socialist Federal Republic of Yugoslavia) HAVK Mladost			
1978-79	European Cup; Champion	Semi-final round	(West Germany) Würzburg 05	4-6		2nd place
1978-79	European Cup; Champion	Semi-final round	(Socialist Federal Republic of Yugoslavia) Partizan	8-5		2nd place
1978-79	European Cup; Champion	Semi-final round	(Bulgaria) Akademik Sofia	8-2		2nd place
1978-79	European Cup; Champion	Final round	(West Germany) Würzburg 05	5-4		1st place
1978-79	European Cup; Champion	Final round	(Italy) Pro Recco	7-4		1st place
1978-79	European Cup; Champion	Final round	(Spain) Montjuïc	5-2		1st place
2014-15	Champions League	elimination in Third qualifying round				
2015-16	Champions League	Preliminary round (Group B)	(Italy) Pro Recco	7-12	2-7	4th place
2015-16	Champions League	Preliminary round (Group B)	(Serbia) Partizan	10-8	4-5	4th place
2015-16	Champions League	Preliminary round (Group B)	(Croatia) Jug Dubrovnik	7-9	7-10	4th place
2015-16	Champions League	Preliminary round (Group B)	(Turkey) Galatasaray	13-4	12-9	4th place
2015-16	Champions League	Preliminary round (Group B)	(Hungary) Szolnok	12-6	7-8	4th place
2016-17	Champions League	Preliminary round (Group A)	(Greece) Olympiacos	7-8	4-7	4th place
2016-17	Champions League	Preliminary round (Group A)	(Hungary) Szolnok	8-9	8-10	4th place
2016-17	Champions League	Preliminary round (Group A)	(Germany) Spandau 04	5-5	10-6	4th place
2016-17	Champions League	Preliminary round (Group A)	(France) Olympic Nice	11-9	13-7	4th place
2016-17	Champions League	Preliminary round (Group A)	(Italy) Brescia	7-7	6-6	4th place
2017-18	Champions League	Preliminary round (Group A)	(Russia) Dynamo Moscow	5-10	7-7	7th place
2017-18	Champions League	Preliminary round (Group A)	(Croatia) Jug Dubrovnik	4-7	10-12	7th place
2017-18	Champions League	Preliminary round (Group A)	(Spain) Barceloneta	6-8	6-12	7th place
2017-18	Champions League	Preliminary round (Group A)	(Germany) Waspo Hannover	8-7	8-13	7th place
2017-18	Champions League	Preliminary round (Group A)	(Serbia) Partizan	14-6	11-7	7th place
2017-18	Champions League	Preliminary round (Group A)	(Italy) Brescia	6-8	5-9	7th place
2017-18	Champions League	Preliminary round (Group A)	(Greece) Olympiacos	6-10	7-10	7th place
2018-19	Euro Cup	Quarter-finals	(Spain) Terrassa	10-7	9-9	19–16
2018-19	Euro Cup	Semi-finals	(Montenegro) Jadran Herceg Novi	12-13	10-11	22–24
2019-20	Champions League	Preliminary round (Group B)	(Hungary) Ferencváros	10-10	11-8	Cancelled
2019-20	Champions League	Preliminary round (Group B)	(Croatia) HAVK Mladost	13-10	(canc.)	Cancelled
2019-20	Champions League	Preliminary round (Group B)	(Italy) Pro Recco	10-14	12-9	Cancelled
2019-20	Champions League	Preliminary round (Group B)	(Spain) Terrassa	21-4	15-10	Cancelled
2019-20	Champions League	Preliminary round (Group B)	(Germany) Waspo Hannover	19-10	(canc.)	Cancelled
2019-20	Champions League	Preliminary round (Group B)	(France) Marseille	10-13	(canc.)	Cancelled
2019-20	Champions League	Preliminary round (Group B)	(Georgia (country)) Dinamo Tbilisi	(canc.)	14-8	Cancelled
2020-21	Champions League	elimination in Qualifying round				
2020-21	Euro Cup; Finalist	Round of 16	(France) Pays d'Aix	20-9	22-6	42–15
2020-21	Euro Cup; Finalist	Quarter-finals	(Spain) Sabadell	17-11	10-12	27–23
2020-21	Euro Cup; Finalist	Semi-finals	(Greece) Vouliagmeni	10-7	11-9	21–16
2020-21	Euro Cup; Finalist	Finals	(Hungary) Szolnok	11-8	11-14	22–22 (0–3 p)
2021-22	Champions League	Preliminary round (Group B)	(Italy) Pro Recco	8-14	14-17	5th place
2021-22	Champions League	Preliminary round (Group B)	(Croatia) Jug Dubrovnik	10-15	12-11	5th place
2021-22	Champions League	Preliminary round (Group B)	(Germany) Waspo Hannover	12-17	12-12	5th place
2021-22	Champions League	Preliminary round (Group B)	(France) Marseille	9-14	9-13	5th place
2021-22	Champions League	Preliminary round (Group B)	(Germany) Spandau 04	0-10^{w/o}	12-11	5th place
2021-22	Champions League	Preliminary round (Group B)	(Romania) Steaua București	13-9	11-8	5th place
2021-22	Champions League	Preliminary round (Group B)	(Serbia) Crvena zvezda	14-8	15-9	5th place
2022-23	Champions League	Preliminary round (Group B)	(Serbia) Novi Beograd	-	9-17	
2022-23	Champions League	Preliminary round (Group B)	(Hungary) Ferencváros	-	-	
2022-23	Champions League	Preliminary round (Group B)	(France) Marseille	-	10-10	
2022-23	Champions League	Preliminary round (Group B)	(Croatia) Jug Dubrovnik	-	-	
2022-23	Champions League	Preliminary round (Group B)	(Spain) Sabadell	9-8	-	
2022-23	Champions League	Preliminary round (Group B)	(Germany) Spandau 04	9-9	-	
2022-23	Champions League	Preliminary round (Group B)	(Italy) Brescia	-	-	

== Notable former players ==
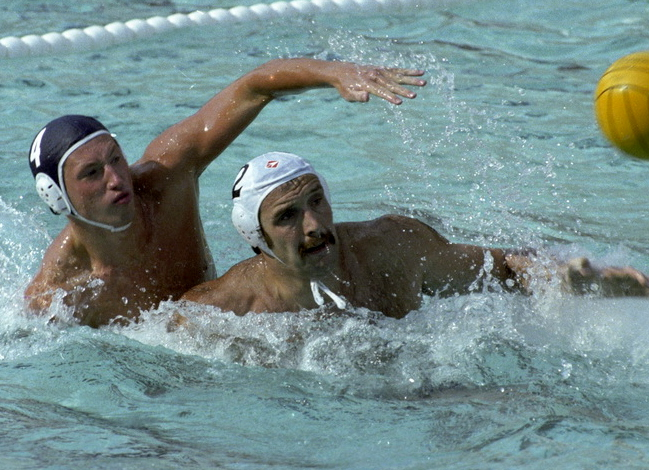
István Szívós in white cap

=== Olympic champions ===
- András Bodnár – 17 years (1962-1979) 1964 Tokyo
- Ferenc Konrád – 13 years (1966-1979) 1976 Montreal
- István Szívós – 12 years (1968-1980) 1976 Montreal
- Attila Sudár – 11 years (1972-1981, 1983–1984, 1992–1993) 1976 Montreal
- János Konrád – 1 year (1975-1976) 1964 Tokyo
- (Serbia) Slobodan Nikić – 1 year (2016-2017) 2016 Rio de Janeiro
- (Serbia) Sava Ranđelović – 1 year (2017-____) 2016 Rio de Janeiro
- Bulcsú Székely – junior years 2000 Sydney
