= 2015–16 LEN Champions League preliminary round =

This article describes the group stage of the 2015–16 LEN Champions League.

== Format ==
12 teams were drawn into two groups of six teams, where they play each other twice. The top three teams will advance to the final six.

Key to colours in group tables
Top three placed teams advanced to the Final Six

== Groups ==
The matchdays are 28 October, 11 November, 28 November, 16 December 2015 and 3 February, 10 February, 12 March, 16 April, 30 April and 18 May 2016.

=== Group A ===
Pos	Team	Pld	W	D	L	PF	PA	PD	Pts	Qualification
1	(Spain) Atlètic-Barceloneta	4	2	1	1	36	30	+6	7	Advance to semifinals
2	(Croatia) Primorje	4	2	1	1	32	32	0	7	Advance to quarter-finals
3	(Greece) Olympiacos	4	1	3	0	33	30	+3	6	Advance to quarter-finals
4	(Hungary) Eger	4	1	2	1	32	32	0	5	Eliminated
5	(Germany) Spandau 04	4	0	3	1	36	38	−2	3	Eliminated
6	(Montenegro) Jadran Herceg Novi	4	0	2	2	39	46	−7	2	Eliminated

Updated to match(es) played on 16 December 2015. Source: LEN

=== Group B ===
Pos	Team	Pld	W	D	L	PF	PA	PD	Pts	Qualification
1	(Italy) Pro Recco	4	4	0	0	56	20	+36	12	Advance to semifinals
2	(Hungary) Szolnoki Dózsa	4	3	0	1	45	33	+12	9	Advance to quarter-finals
3	(Croatia) Jug Dubrovnik	4	3	0	1	41	40	+1	9	Advance to quarter-finals
4	(Serbia) Partizan	4	2	0	2	26	41	−15	6	Eliminated
5	(Hungary) OSC Budapest	4	0	0	4	25	34	−9	0	Eliminated
6	(Turkey) Galatasaray	4	0	0	4	29	54	−25	0	Eliminated

Updated to match(es) played on 16 December 2015. Source: LEN

16 December; 20:00	Report	Galatasaray (Turkey)	7–14	(Hungary) Szolnoki Dózsa	„Engin Bora” Havuzu, Istanbul; Referees: Stavropulos (GRE), Voevodin (RUS)
16 December; 20:00	Report	Score by quarters: 3–5, 3–3, 1–2, 0–4			„Engin Bora” Havuzu, Istanbul; Referees: Stavropulos (GRE), Voevodin (RUS)
16 December; 20:00	Report	Nikić 2	Goals	Dé. Varga 6	„Engin Bora” Havuzu, Istanbul; Referees: Stavropulos (GRE), Voevodin (RUS)

16 December; 20:00	Report	Partizan (Serbia)	5–4	(Hungary) OSC Budapest	SC Banjica, Belgrade; Referees: Racine (LEN), Koganov (AZE)
16 December; 20:00	Report	Score by quarters: 1–1, 2–0, 1–0, 1–3			SC Banjica, Belgrade; Referees: Racine (LEN), Koganov (AZE)
16 December; 20:00	Report	Stojanović 2	Goals	Decker 2	SC Banjica, Belgrade; Referees: Racine (LEN), Koganov (AZE)

16 December; 20:45	Report	Pro Recco (Italy)	14–6	(Croatia) Jug Dubrovnik	Piscina Comunale, Sori; Referees: Margeta (SLO), Naumov (RUS)
16 December; 20:45	Report	Score by quarters: 1–1, 5–2, 3–1, 5–2			Piscina Comunale, Sori; Referees: Margeta (SLO), Naumov (RUS)
16 December; 20:45	Report	Mandić 3	Goals	Perrone 3	Piscina Comunale, Sori; Referees: Margeta (SLO), Naumov (RUS)
