= Deutsche Wasserball-Liga =

German water polo league

- Sport: water polo
- Founded: 1912 (M); 1982 (W)
- No. of teams: 8 (M); 9 (W)
- Country: Germany
- Most recent champions: SG Waspo'98 Hannover (M); Blau-Weiss Bochum (W)

The Deutsche Wasserball-Liga (DWL) is the premier category in the league system for water polo clubs in Germany.

The men's championship was founded in 1912, but only two editions took place. It was resumed in 1919 and has taken place regularly since except for 1935, 1944 and 1945. Four-times European champions WF Spandau 04 has dominated the championship for the past three decades, with a record 38 titles since 1979.

The women's championship was founded in 1982. Blau-Weiss Bochum is its leading team, having won all editions from 2000 to 2011. Hohenlimburger SV and SG Neukölln were the main forces in previous years with six titles each.

== List of champions ==
=== Men's championship ===
- WF Spandau 04 (38)
  - 1979, 1980, 1981, 1982, 1983, 1984, 1985, 1986, 1987, 1988, 1989, 1990, 1991, 1992, 1994, 1995, 1996, 1997, 1998, 1999, 2000, 2001, 2002, 2003, 2004, 2005, 2007, 2008, 2009, 2010, 2011, 2012, 2014, 2015, 2016, 2017, 2019, 2023
- Rote Erde Hamm (11)
  - 1954, 1955, 1956, 1959, 1960, 1964, 1966, 1969, 1971, 1972, 1975
- WF 98 Hannover (8)
  - 1921, 1922, 1923, 1927, 1936, 1937, 1938, 1948
- Hellas Magdeburg (8)
  - 1924, 1925, 1926, 1928, 1929, 1930, 1931, 1933
- SG Waspo'98 Hannover (7)
  - 2018, 2020, 2021, 2022, 2024, 2025, 2026
- Duisburger SV 98 (7)
  - 1939, 1940, 1941, 1952, 1958, 1961, 1962
- ASC Duisburg (6)
  - 1957, 1963, 1965, 1967, 1968, 2013
- SV Würzburg 05 (5)
  - 1970, 1974, 1976, 1977, 1978
- SSF Barmen (4)
  - 1947, 1949, 1950, 1951
- Germania 1887 Berlin
  - 1912, 1913
- Weissensee 96
  - 1932, 1934
- Erster Frankfurter SC
  - 1919
- Nikar Heidelberg
  - 1920
- Luftwaffen SV Berlin
  - 1942
- 1. Wiener Amateur SV
  - 1943
- Bayern Nürnberg
  - 1953
- Waspo Hannover-Linden
  - 1993
- SV Cannstatt
  - 2006

=== Women's championship ===
- Blau-Weiss Bochum
  - 2000, 2001, 2002, 2003, 2004, 2005, 2006, 2007, 2008, 2009, 2010, 2011
- Hohenlimburger SV
  - 1983, 1984, 1987, 1991, 1997, 1999
- SG Neukölln
  - 1986, 1988, 1989, 1990, 1995, 1998
- SV Grönau
  - 1993, 1996
- SSC Südwest 1947
  - 1985
- Delphin Wüppertal
  - 1992
- Bayer Uerdingen
  - 1994
- Poseidon Köln
  - 1982

== 2011-12 teams ==
=== Men's championship ===
- Bayer Uerdingen
- ASC Duisburg
- SGW Hannover
- OSC Potsdam
- WF Spandau 04
- Wedding Berlin
- SV Weiden
- SV Würzburg 05

=== Women's championship ===
- Bayer Uerdingen
- Blau-Weiss Bochum
- SC Chemnitz
- FS Duisburg
- ETV Hamburg
- Hannoverscher SV
- SV Hohenlimburg
- SG Neukölln
- Nikar Heidelberg
