= Marko Bijač =

Croatian water polo player (born 1991)

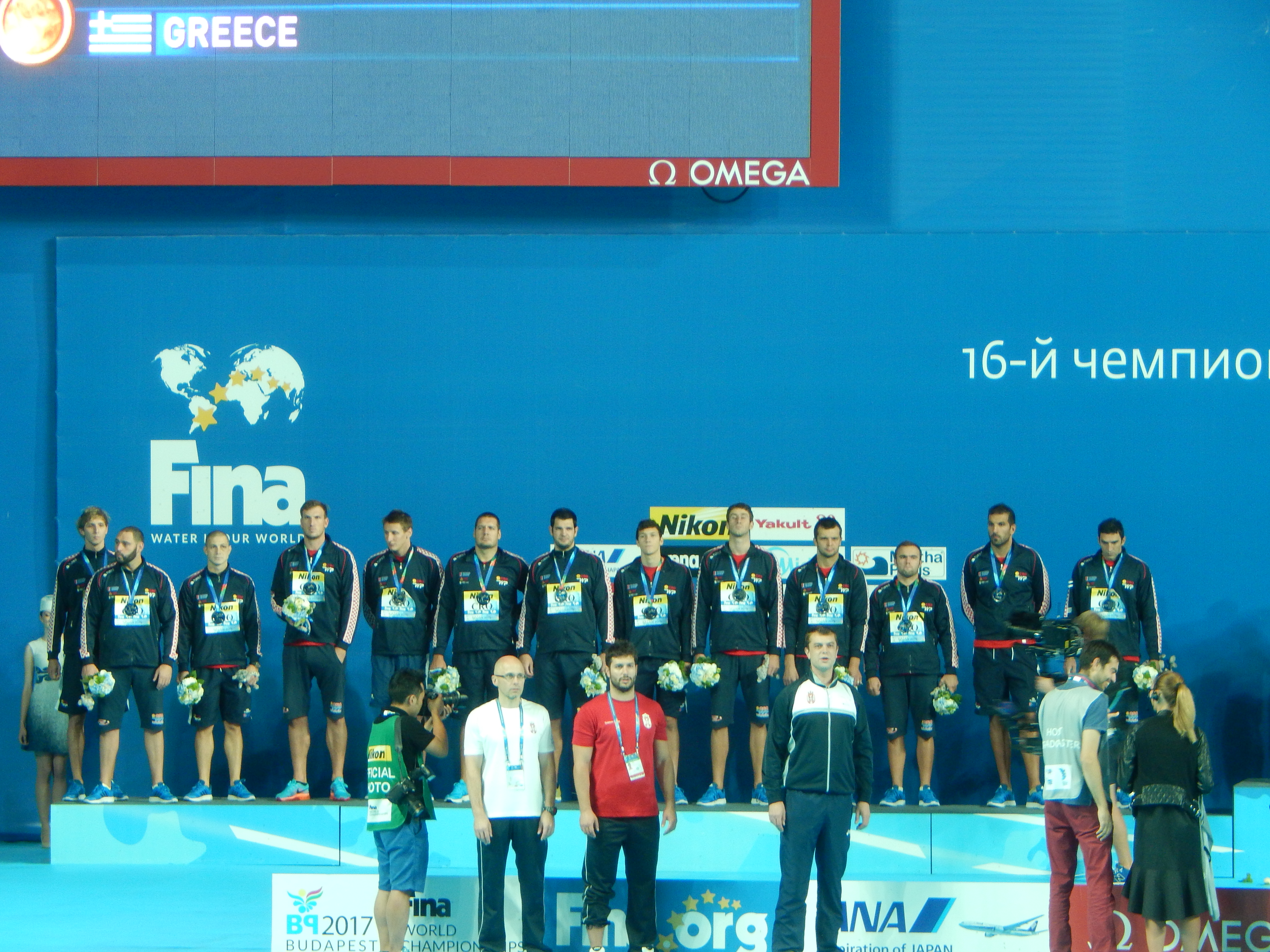
- Bijač (on far left) at 2015 World Aquatics Championships

Personal information
- Nationality: Croatian
- Born: 12 January 1991 (age 35) Dubrovnik, SFR Yugoslavia
- Height: 2.01 m (6 ft 7 in)
- Weight: 85 kg (187 lb)

Sport
- Sport: Water polo
- Handedness: Right
- Position: Goalkeeper
- Current club: VK Jadran Split
- Number: 1

Senior clubs
- Years: Team
- 2012–2018: VK Jug
- 2018–2021: Pro Recco
- 2021–2024: Olympiacos
- 2024–: VK Jadran Split
National team
- Years: Team
- 2012–: Croatia
Medal record
Men's water polo
Representing Croatia
Olympic Games
Silver medal – second place	2016 Rio de Janeiro	Team
Silver medal – second place	2024 Paris	Team
World Championship
Gold medal – first place	2017 Budapest	Team
Gold medal – first place	2024 Doha	Team
Silver medal – second place	2015 Kazan	Team
Bronze medal – third place	2013 Barcelona	Team
Bronze medal – third place	2019 Gwanjgu	Team
European Championship
Gold medal – first place	2022 Split
Silver medal – second place	2024 Zagreb
Bronze medal – third place	2018 Barcelona
FINA World League
Silver medal – second place	2015 Bergamo
Silver medal – second place	2019 Belgrade
Bronze medal – third place	2017 Ruza
World Cup
Bronze medal – third place	2014 Kazakhstan
Mediterranean Games
Gold medal – first place	2013 Mersin	Team

Marko Bijač (born 12 January 1991) is a Croatian water polo player. He was part of the Croatian team at the 2016 Summer Olympics, and the 2024 Summer Olympics, winning a silver medal each year. Bijač also competed for Croatia at the 2020 Summer Olympics, where the team finished in fifth place.

== Honours ==
=== Club ===
Jug Dubrovnik

- LEN Champions League: 2015–16; runners-up: 2012–13, 2016–17
- Adriatic League: 2015–16, 2016–17, 2017–18
- LEN Super Cup: 2016
- Croatian Championship: 2012–13, 2015–16, 2016–17, 2017–18
- Croatian Cup: 2015–16, 2016–17, 2017–18

Pro Recco

- LEN Champions League: 2020–21
- Serie A: 2018–19
- Coppa Italia: 2018–19, 2020–21

Olympiacos

- Greek Championship: 2021–22, 2022–23
- Greek Cup: 2021–22, 2022–23, 2023–24

=== Individual ===
- LEN "European Player of the Year": 2017
- Member of the World Team by total-waterpolo: 2022
- Croatian Water Polo Player of the Year (2): 2016, 2022
- Croatian Goalkeeper of the Year (4): 2015–16, 2017–18, 2020–21, 2021–22
- Adriatic League Goalkeeper of the Year: 2013–14
- LEN Champions League Goalkeeper of the Year (4): 2015–16, 2016–17, 2020–21, 2024–25
- LEN Champions League Final Six Best Goalkeeper: 2016
- LEN Champions League Final Eight Best Goalkeeper: 2021
- Best Goalkeeper of the 2016 Olympic Games in Rio de Janeiro
- Olympic Games 2016 Team of the Tournament
- World League Best Goalkeeper: 2019
- European Championship Goalkeeper of the Tournament (2): 2022, 2024

== See also ==
- Croatia men's Olympic water polo team records and statistics
- List of Olympic medalists in water polo (men)
- List of men's Olympic water polo tournament goalkeepers
- List of world champions in men's water polo
- List of World Aquatics Championships medalists in water polo
