= Emanuel Raasch =

German racing cyclist (1955–2026)

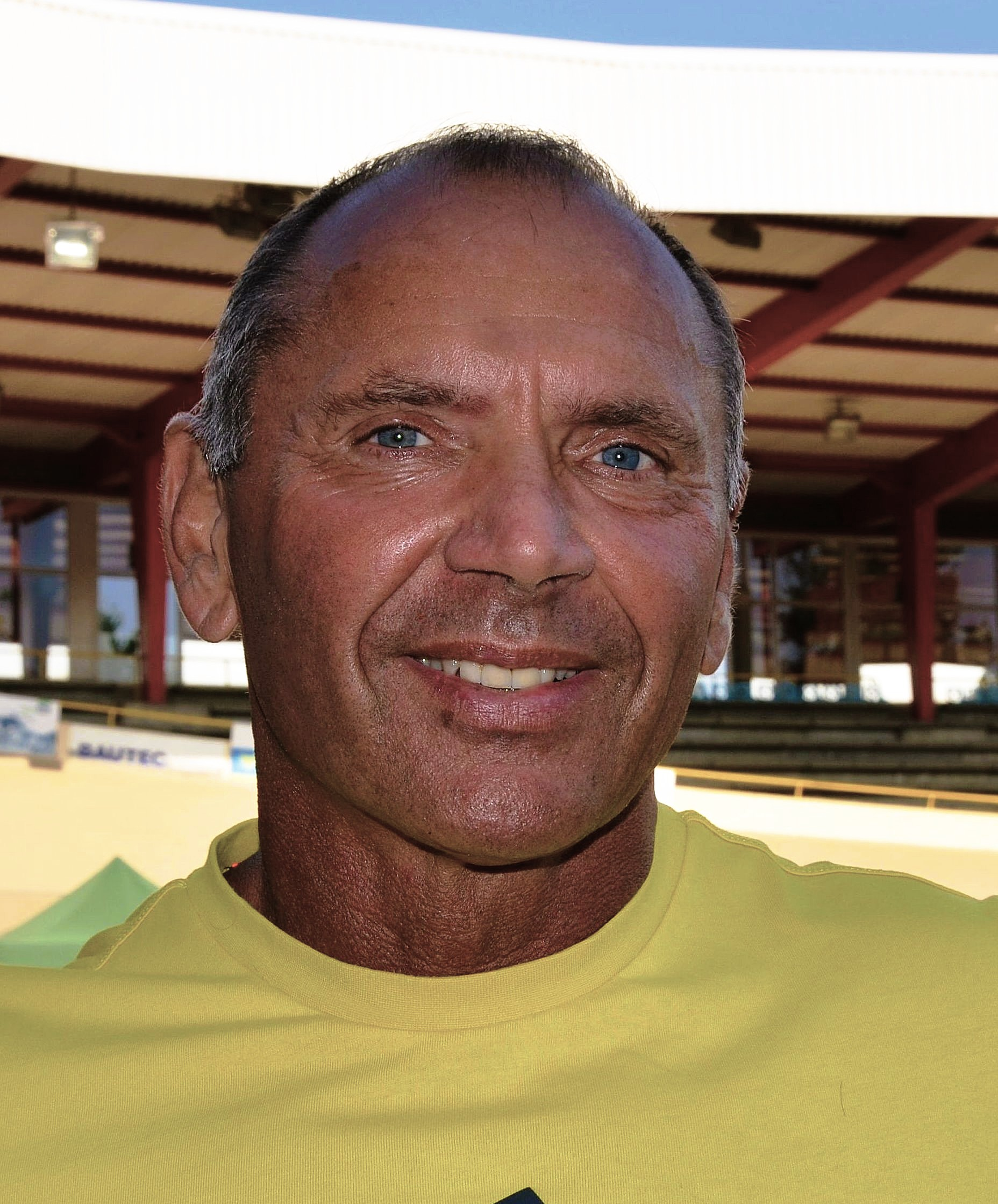
- Raasch in 2014

Personal information
- Born: 16 November 1955 Burg bei Magdeburg, East Germany
- Died: 22 May 2026 (aged 70)

Cycling career
- Sport: Cycling
- Discipline: Racing
- Role: Rider

Professional team
- ?: SG Dynamo Magdeburg/SV Dynamo
Medal record
Representing East Germany
Men's track cycling
World Championships
Bronze medal – third place	1975 Rocourt	Sprint
Silver medal – second place	1977 San Cristobal	Sprint
Silver medal – second place	1978 Munich	Sprint
Silver medal – second place	1979 Amsterdam	Sprint
Bronze medal – third place	1982 Leicester	Time trial
Gold medal – first place	1991 Stuttgart	Tandem

Emanuel Raasch (16 November 1955 – 22 May 2026) was a German racing cyclist who competed for the SG Dynamo Magdeburg / Sportvereinigung (SV) Dynamo. He won many titles during his career.

Raasch was later a bodybuilder in the over 50 category.

Raasch died following a severe illness on 22 May 2026, at the age of 70.

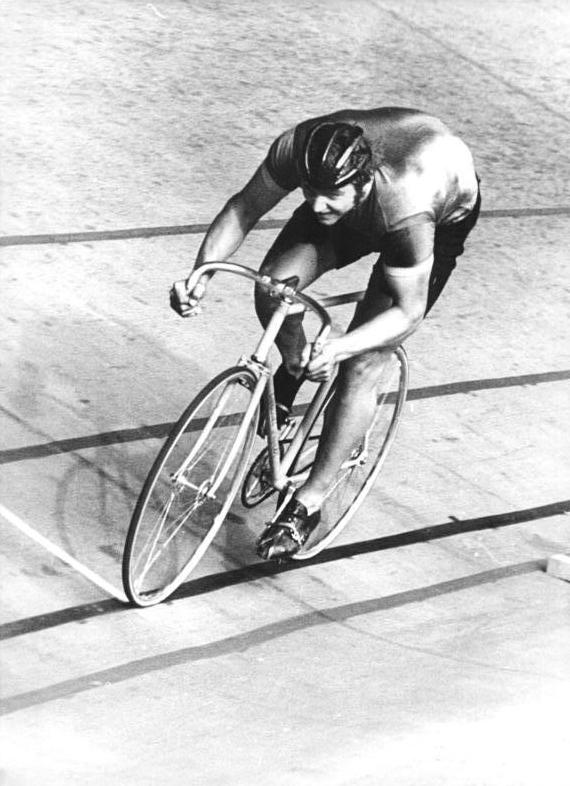
Emanuel Raasch in 1975
