= 2020–21 LEN Champions League =

Water polo sports season

- League: LEN Champions League
- Sport: Water Polo
- Duration: 11 November 2020 – 5 June 2021
- Number of teams: 28 (from 13 countries); Qualification round: 18; Preliminary round: 10
- Season MVP: (Serbia) Dusan Mandic (Pro Recco)
- Top scorer: (Greece) Angelos Vlachopoulos (AN Brescia) 41 goals

Final 8
- Champions: (Italy) Pro Recco (9th title)
- Runners-up: (Hungary) FTC Telekom Budapest
- Finals MVP: (Serbia) Dusan Mandic (Pro Recco)

Champions League seasons
- ← 2019–20 2021–22 →

The 2020–21 LEN Champions League was the 58th edition of LEN's premier competition for men's water polo clubs.

== Teams ==
Preliminary round
(Croatia) Jug CO Dubrovnik	(Germany) Spandau 04	(Hungary) FTC Telekom	(Montenegro) Jadran Herceg Novi
(France) CN Marseille	(Germany) Waspo 98 Hannover	(Italy) Pro Recco	(Spain) Zodiac CNA Barceloneta
(Georgia (country)) Dinamo Tbilisi	(Greece) Olympiacos		

Qualification round
(Croatia) Mladost Zagreb	(Greece) Ydraikos	(Montenegro) Primorac Kotor	(Serbia) Radnički Kragujevac
(Croatia) Jadran Split	(Hungary) OSC Budapest	(Romania) Steaua Bucharest	(Spain) CN Barcelona
(France) Pays d’Aix Natation	(Hungary) Szolnok	(Romania) Digi Oradea	(Spain) CN Terrassa
(France) Tourcoing	(Italy) AN Brescia	(Russia) Sintez Kazan	(Turkey) Enka Istanbul
(Greece) Vouliagmeni	(Italy) Ortigia Siracusa		

== Schedule ==
The schedule of the competition is as follows.

Phase	Round	Date
Qualification round		11–15 November 2020
Preliminary round	Round 1	14–18 December 2020
Preliminary round	Round 2	1–5 March 2021
Preliminary round	Round 3	19–23 April 2021
Final 8		3–5 June 2021

== Qualification round ==
The qualification round is scheduled for 11–15 November 2020.

=== Group A ===
==== A1 ====
Pos	Team	Pld	W	D	L	GF	GA	GD	Pts	Qualification	(Italy) CCO	(Spain) CNB	(Croatia) JST	(Montenegro) PRI	(Romania) STE
1	(Italy) Ortigia Siracusa (H)	4	3	1	0	33	21	+12	10	Final	—	5–3	11–7	8–8	9–3
2	(Spain) CN Barcelona	4	2	1	1	34	20	+14	7		—	—	8–8	12–3	11–4
3	(Croatia) Jadran Split	4	2	1	1	45	42	+3	7		—	—	—	16–11	14–12
4	(Montenegro) Primorac Kotor	4	1	1	2	33	44	−11	4		—	—	—	—	11–8
5	(Romania) Steaua Bucharest	4	0	0	4	27	45	−18	0		—	—	—	—	—

Source: LEN
(H) Hosts

==== A2 ====
Pos	Team	Pld	W	D	L	GF	GA	GD	Pts	Qualification	(Croatia) MZG	(Hungary) SZO	(France) AIX	(Greece) YDR
1	(Croatia) Mladost Zagreb	3	2	1	0	44	31	+13	7	Final	—	18–18	16–13	10–0
2	(Hungary) Szolnok	3	2	1	0	39	27	+12	7		—	—	11–9	10–0
3	(France) Pays d’Aix Natation	3	1	0	2	32	27	+5	3		—	—	—	10–0
4	(Greece) Ydraikos	3	0	0	3	0	30	−30	0	Disqualified	—	—	—	—

Source: LEN

==== Final ====
Team 1	Score	Team 2
Ortigia Siracusa (Italy)	9–8	(Croatia) Mladost Zagreb

=== Group B ===
==== B1 ====
Pos	Team	Pld	W	D	L	GF	GA	GD	Pts	Qualification	(Serbia) RKG	(Hungary) OSC	(Russia) SIN	(Spain) CNT	(France) ENT
1	(Serbia) Radnički Kragujevac	4	2	2	0	45	38	+7	8	Final	—	9–9	16–14	13–8	—
2	(Hungary) OSC Budapest (H)	4	2	1	1	48	45	+3	7		—	—	—	15–16	12–9
3	(Russia) Sintez Kazan	4	2	0	2	54	47	+7	6		—	11–12	—	—	—
4	(Spain) CN Terrassa	4	1	1	2	45	56	−11	4		—	—	12–9	—	11–11
5	(France) Tourcoing	4	0	2	2	36	42	−6	2		7–7	—	9–12	—	—

Source: LEN
(H) Hosts

==== B2 ====
Pos	Team	Pld	W	D	L	GF	GA	GD	Pts	Qualification	(Italy) BRE	(Greece) NCV	(Romania) ORA	(Turkey) ESK
1	(Italy) AN Brescia	3	3	0	0	38	7	+31	9	Final	—	10–6	—	10–0
2	(Greece) Vouliagmeni	3	2	0	1	32	19	+13	6		—	—	16–9	—
3	(Romania) Digi Oradea	3	1	0	2	20	34	−14	3		1–18	—	—	10–0
4	(Turkey) Enka Istanbul	3	0	0	3	0	30	−30	0	Disqualified	—	0–10	—	—

Source: LEN

==== Final ====
Team 1	Score	Team 2
Radnički Kragujevac (Serbia)	9–13	(Italy) AN Brescia

== Preliminary round ==
Location of teams of the 2020–21 LEN Champions League preliminary round.

LEN decided to play the 10 match-days of the 2020–21 LEN Champions League preliminary round in bubble format in three rounds, using two venues at each occasion. The ten match-days will be played in three rounds at two venues each time. Teams of the same group will contest three match-days, one time four, where the participants will be isolated for the entire duration of event because of the COVID-19 pandemic.

The draw for the group phase took place in Rome on 19 October 2020.

=== Group A ===
Pos	Team	Pld	W	D	L	GF	GA	GD	Pts	Qualification	(Italy) REC	(Croatia) JUG	(Greece) OLY	(France) CNM	(Germany) S04	(Italy) CCO
1	(Italy) Pro Recco	10	10	0	0	127	68	+59	30	Final 8	—	18–3	13–6	11–9	19–6	10–3
2	(Croatia) Jug CO Dubrovnik	10	6	1	3	102	106	−4	19	Final 8	11–12	—	11–11	11–10	12–10	8–6
3	(Greece) Olympiacos	10	4	2	4	89	92	−3	14	Final 8	8–14	8–9	—	11–7	8–8	6–4
4	(France) CN Marseille	10	4	1	5	93	94	−1	13	Final 8	8–10	15–13	9–8	—	8–5	10–11
5	(Germany) Spandau 04	10	1	3	6	79	104	−25	6		7–10	7–13	9–13	7–7	—	12–6
6	(Italy) Ortigia Siracusa	10	1	1	8	69	95	−26	4		7–10	9–11	8–10	7–10	8–8	—

Source: LEN

=== Group B ===
Pos	Team	Pld	W	D	L	GF	GA	GD	Pts	Qualification	(Hungary) FTC	(Spain) BAR	(Italy) BRE	(Germany) HAN	(Georgia (country)) DTB	(Montenegro) JHN
1	(Hungary) FTC Telekom	10	8	0	2	113	73	+40	24	Final 8	—	11–10	7–10	13–9	15–11	12–5
2	(Spain) Zodiac CNA Barceloneta	10	8	0	2	119	81	+38	24	Final 8	7–8	—	10–9	12–8	17–5	13–11
3	(Italy) AN Brescia	10	7	0	3	117	80	+37	21	Final 8	9–6	6–8	—	19–11	14–6	6–7
4	(Germany) Waspo 98 Hannover	10	3	0	7	89	122	−33	9	Final 8	6–19	8–16	10–18	—	10–3	9–4
5	(Georgia (country)) Dinamo Tbilisi	10	2	0	8	74	121	−47	6		4–11	6–14	9–15	6–7	—	11–8
6	(Montenegro) Jadran Herceg Novi	10	2	0	8	74	109	−35	6		2–11	9–12	6–11	12–11	10–13	—

Source: LEN

== Final 8 ==
3–5 June 2021, Belgrade, Serbia.

Location of the 2020–21 LEN Champions League Final 8

=== Qualified teams ===
Group	Winners	Runners-up	Third	Fourth
A	(Italy) Pro Recco	(Croatia) Jug AO Dubrovnik	(Greece) Olympiacos	(France) CN Marseille
B	(Hungary) FTC Telekom	(Spain) Zodiac CNAB	(Italy) AN Brescia	(Germany) Waspo 98 Hannover

=== Bracket ===
Quarterfinals
3 June
(Italy) Pro Recco	16
(Germany) Waspo 98 Hannover	9
3 June
(Spain) Zodiac CNAB	22
(Greece) Olympiacos	9
3 June
(Hungary) FTC Telekom	14
(France) CN Marseille	6
3 June
(Croatia) Jug AO Dubrovnik	10
(Italy) AN Brescia	12

Semifinals
4 June
(Italy) Pro Recco	12
(Spain) Zodiac CNAB	10
4 June
(Hungary) FTC Telekom	14
(Italy) AN Brescia	12

Final
5 June
(Italy) Pro Recco	9
(Hungary) FTC Telekom	6
Third place game
5 June
(Spain) Zodiac CNAB	7
(Italy) AN Brescia	13

5th–8th place bracket

5th–8th place semifinals
4 June
(Germany) Waspo 98 Hannover	10
(Greece) Olympiacos	8
4 June
(France) CN Marseille	13
(Croatia) Jug AO Dubrovnik	16

Fifth place game
5 June
(Germany) Waspo 98 Hannover	11
(Croatia) Jug AO Dubrovnik	16
Seventh place game
5 June
(Greece) Olympiacos	13
(France) CN Marseille	12

All times are local (UTC+2).

=== Quarterfinals ===
3 June 2021; 13:00	Report	Pro Recco (Italy)	16–9	(Germany) Waspo 98 Hannover	Sports Centre April 11th, Belgrade; Referees: (Hungary) Kun (Israel) Schwartz
3 June 2021; 13:00	Report	Score by quarters: 5–2, 4–3, 1–2, 6–2			Sports Centre April 11th, Belgrade; Referees: (Hungary) Kun (Israel) Schwartz
3 June 2021; 13:00	Report	Ivović 5	Goals	Brguljan 3	Sports Centre April 11th, Belgrade; Referees: (Hungary) Kun (Israel) Schwartz

3 June 2021; 15:30	Report	FTC Telekom (Hungary)	14–6	(France) CN Marseille	Sports Centre April 11th, Belgrade; Referees: (Romania) Alexandrescu (Russia) Voevodin
3 June 2021; 15:30	Report	Score by quarters: 3–0, 4–1, 3–3, 4–2			Sports Centre April 11th, Belgrade; Referees: (Romania) Alexandrescu (Russia) Voevodin
3 June 2021; 15:30	Report	Fountoulis 4	Goals	Vukičević 2	Sports Centre April 11th, Belgrade; Referees: (Romania) Alexandrescu (Russia) Voevodin

3 June 2021; 18:00	Report	Jug AO Dubrovnik (Croatia)	10–12	(Italy) AN Brescia	Sports Centre April 11th, Belgrade; Referees: (Greece) Stavridis (Netherlands) Zwart
3 June 2021; 18:00	Report	Score by quarters: 2–3, 3–3, 3–3, 2–3			Sports Centre April 11th, Belgrade; Referees: (Greece) Stavridis (Netherlands) Zwart
3 June 2021; 18:00	Report	Fatović 4	Goals	Alesiani 3	Sports Centre April 11th, Belgrade; Referees: (Greece) Stavridis (Netherlands) Zwart

3 June 2021; 20:30	Report	Zodiac CNA Barceloneta (Spain)	22–9	(Greece) Olympiacos	Sports Centre April 11th, Belgrade; Referees: (Slovenia) Margeta (Serbia) Putniković
3 June 2021; 20:30	Report	Score by quarters: 6–0, 7–2, 6–3, 3–4			Sports Centre April 11th, Belgrade; Referees: (Slovenia) Margeta (Serbia) Putniković
3 June 2021; 20:30	Report	three players 4	Goals	Genidounias 3	Sports Centre April 11th, Belgrade; Referees: (Slovenia) Margeta (Serbia) Putniković

=== 5th–8th place semifinals ===
4 June 2021; 13:00	Report	Waspo 98 Hannover (Germany)	10–8	(Greece) Olympiacos	Sports Centre April 11th, Belgrade; Referees: (Serbia) Putniković (Montenegro) Ivanovski
4 June 2021; 13:00	Report	Score by quarters: 2–1, 4–2, 3–3, 1–2			Sports Centre April 11th, Belgrade; Referees: (Serbia) Putniković (Montenegro) Ivanovski
4 June 2021; 13:00	Report	Radović 6	Goals	Genidounias 3	Sports Centre April 11th, Belgrade; Referees: (Serbia) Putniković (Montenegro) Ivanovski

4 June 2021; 15:30	Report	CN Marseille (France)	13–16	(Croatia) Jug AO Dubrovnik	Sports Centre April 11th, Belgrade; Referees: (Netherlands) Zwart (Hungary) Kun
4 June 2021; 15:30	Report	Score by quarters: 1–1, 4–6, 5–5, 3–4			Sports Centre April 11th, Belgrade; Referees: (Netherlands) Zwart (Hungary) Kun
4 June 2021; 15:30	Report	Crousillat 4	Goals	Papanastasiou 5	Sports Centre April 11th, Belgrade; Referees: (Netherlands) Zwart (Hungary) Kun

=== Semifinals ===
4 June 2021; 18:00	Report	Pro Recco (Italy)	12–10	(Spain) Zodiac CNA Barceloneta	Sports Centre April 11th, Belgrade; Referees: (Romania) Alexandrescu (Greece) Stavridis
4 June 2021; 18:00	Report	Score by quarters: 2–4, 4–3, 4–1, 2–2			Sports Centre April 11th, Belgrade; Referees: (Romania) Alexandrescu (Greece) Stavridis
4 June 2021; 18:00	Report	Mandić 4	Goals	Perrone 3	Sports Centre April 11th, Belgrade; Referees: (Romania) Alexandrescu (Greece) Stavridis

4 June 2021; 20:30	Report	FTC Telekom (Hungary)	14–12	(Italy) AN Brescia	Sports Centre April 11th, Belgrade; Referees: (Slovenia) Martega (Russia) Voevodin
4 June 2021; 20:30	Report	Score by quarters: 4–0, 4–6, 3–5, 3–1			Sports Centre April 11th, Belgrade; Referees: (Slovenia) Martega (Russia) Voevodin
4 June 2021; 20:30	Report	Vámos, Varga 4	Goals	Joković, Vlachopoulos 3	Sports Centre April 11th, Belgrade; Referees: (Slovenia) Martega (Russia) Voevodin

=== Seventh place game ===
5 June 2021; 13:00	Report	Olympiacos (Greece)	13–12	(France) CN Marseille	Sports Centre April 11th, Belgrade; Referees: (Israel) Schwartz (Montenegro) Ivanovski
5 June 2021; 13:00	Report	Score by quarters: 5–2, 2–4, 4–4, 2–2			Sports Centre April 11th, Belgrade; Referees: (Israel) Schwartz (Montenegro) Ivanovski
5 June 2021; 13:00	Report	Chrysospathis, Genidounias 3	Goals	three players 2	Sports Centre April 11th, Belgrade; Referees: (Israel) Schwartz (Montenegro) Ivanovski

=== Fifth place game ===
5 June 2021; 15:30	Report	Waspo 98 Hannover (Germany)	11–16	(Croatia) Jug AO Dubrovnik	Sports Centre April 11th, Belgrade; Referees: (Greece) Stavridis (Hungary) Kun
5 June 2021; 15:30	Report	Score by quarters: 2–3, 1–6, 4–5, 4–2			Sports Centre April 11th, Belgrade; Referees: (Greece) Stavridis (Hungary) Kun
5 June 2021; 15:30	Report	Macan, Nagaev 3	Goals	Merkulov 5	Sports Centre April 11th, Belgrade; Referees: (Greece) Stavridis (Hungary) Kun

=== Third place game ===
5 June 2021; 18:00	Report	Zodiac CNA Barceloneta (Spain)	7–13	(Italy) AN Brescia	Sports Centre April 11th, Belgrade; Referees: (Netherlands) Zwart (Serbia) Putniković
5 June 2021; 18:00	Report	Score by quarters: 1–3, 2–6, 2–2, 2–2			Sports Centre April 11th, Belgrade; Referees: (Netherlands) Zwart (Serbia) Putniković
5 June 2021; 18:00	Report	Granados 3	Goals	Vlachopoulos 4	Sports Centre April 11th, Belgrade; Referees: (Netherlands) Zwart (Serbia) Putniković

=== Final ===
5 June 2021; 20:30	Report	Pro Recco (Italy)	9–6	(Hungary) FTC Telekom	Sports Centre April 11th, Belgrade; Referees: (Slovenia) Margeta (Romania) Alexandrescu
5 June 2021; 20:30	Report	Score by quarters: 3–2, 2–3, 2–0, 2–1			Sports Centre April 11th, Belgrade; Referees: (Slovenia) Margeta (Romania) Alexandrescu
5 June 2021; 20:30	Report	Mandić 3	Goals	Constantin-Bicari, Vigvari 2	Sports Centre April 11th, Belgrade; Referees: (Slovenia) Margeta (Romania) Alexandrescu

2020–21 LEN Champions League
Champions

Pro Recco
9th title

Marko Bijač, Francesco Di Fulvio, Dušan Mandić, Pietro Figlioli, Aaron Younger, Alessandro Velotto, Nicholas Presciutti, Gonzalo Echenique, Aleksandar Ivović, Benjamin Thomas, Matteo Aicardi, Stefano Luongo, Tommaso Negri
Head coach
Gabriel Hernández

=== Final ranking ===
	Team
	(Italy) Pro Recco
Silver medal	(Hungary) FTC Telekom Budapest
Bronze medal	(Italy) AN Brescia
4	(Spain) Zodiac CNA Barceloneta
5	(Croatia) Jug AO Dubrovnik
6	(Germany) Waspo 98 Hannover
7	(Greece) Olympiacos
8	(France) CN Marseille

=== Awards ===
Season MVP	Top Scorer	Final Eight MVP	Final Eight Best Goalkeeper
(Serbia) Dušan Mandić (Pro Recco)	(Greece) Angelos Vlachopoulos (AN Brescia) 31 goals	(Serbia) Dusan Mandic (Pro Recco)	(Croatia) Marko Bijac (Pro Recco)

Total 7 of the Season
LW	(Hungary) Dénes Varga (Ferecvaros)	CF	(United States) Ben Hallock (Pro Recco)	RW	(Hungary) Gergő Zalánki (Ferecvaros)
LD	(Greece) Angelos Vlachopoulos (AN Brescia)	CB	(Serbia) Nikola Jakšić (Ferecvaros)	RD	(Serbia) Dušan Mandić (Pro Recco)
GK	(Croatia) Marko Bijač (Pro Recco)				

== See also ==
- 2020–21 LEN Euro Cup
