= 2015–16 LEN Champions League =

Water polo sports season

- League: LEN Champions League
- Sport: Water Polo
- Duration: 4 September 2015 to 4 June 2016
- Teams: 12 (preliminary round); 27 (total)
- Season MVP: (Serbia) Filip Filipović (Pro Recco)
- Top scorer: (Hungary) Denes Varga 33 goals (Szolnok)

Final Six
- Finals champions: (Croatia) Jug Dubrovnik (4th Title)
- Runners-up: (Greece) Olympiacos
- Finals MVP: (Spain) Felipe Perrone (Jug Dubrovnik)

Champions League seasons
- ← 2014–15 2016–17 →

The 2015–16 LEN Champions League was the 53rd edition of LEN's premier competition for men's water polo clubs. It ran from 4 September 2015 to 4 June 2016, and was contested by 27 teams from 13 countries. The Final Six (quarterfinals, semifinals, final, and third place game) took place on 2, 3 & 4 June in Budapest.

== Overview ==
=== Team allocation ===
8 teams are directly qualified for the preliminary round.

Preliminary round
(Croatia) Jug	(Germany) Spandau 04	(Hungary) Eger	(Serbia) Partizan
(Spain) Atlètic-Barceloneta	(Greece) Olympiacos	(Italy) Pro Recco^{TH}	(Turkey) Galatasaray
Qualification round II
(Croatia) Primorje	(Hungary) Szolnok	(Serbia) Radnički Kragujevac	(Greece) Vouliagmeni
(Germany) Duisburg	(Italy) Brescia	(Spain) Sabadell	
Qualification round I
(Croatia) Mladost	(Russia) Spartak Volgograd	(Montenegro) Jadran	(France) Montpellier
(Italy) Verona	(Romania) Oradea	(Montenegro) Budva	(Malta) Valletta
(France) Marseille	(Hungary) Orvosegyetem	(Germany) Waspo 98 Hannover	(Georgia (country)) Lokomotiv Tbilisi

=== Round and draw dates ===
The schedule of the competition is as follows.

Phase	Round	First leg	Second leg
Qualifying	Qualification round I	4–6 September 2015	
Qualifying	Qualification round II	18–20 September 2015	
Qualifying	Qualification round III (play-off round)	3 October 2015	17 October 2015
Preliminary round	Matchday 1	28 October 2015	
Preliminary round	Matchday 2	11 November 2015	
Preliminary round	Matchday 3	28 November 2015	
Preliminary round	Matchday 4	16 December 2015	
Preliminary round	Matchday 5	3 February 2016	
Preliminary round	Matchday 6	10 February 2016	
Preliminary round	Matchday 7	30 March 2016	
Preliminary round	Matchday 8	16 April 2016	
Preliminary round	Matchday 9	30 April 2016	
Preliminary round	Matchday 10	18 May 2016	
Final 6 (Budapest)	Quarter-finals	2 June 2016	
Final 6 (Budapest)	Semi-finals	3 June 2016	
Final 6 (Budapest)	Final	4 June 2016	

== Qualifying rounds ==
=== Qualification I ===
- 4-6 September

Twelve teams took part in the Qualification round I. They were drawn into three groups of four teams, whose played on 4–6 September 2015. Top 3 teams of each group advance to qualification round II.

Key to colours in group tables
Progress to the Round II

==== Group A ====
Tournament was played in Herceg Novi, Montenegro.

Team	Pld	W	D	L	GF	GA	GD	Pts	(Russia) SPA	(Montenegro) JAD	(France) MON	(Croatia) HAVK
(Russia) Spartak Volgograd	3	3	0	0	46	30	+16	9			18–12	15–7
(Montenegro) Jadran Carine	3	2	0	1	29	25	+4	6	11–13		11–7	7–5
(France) Montpellier	3	1	0	2	27	35	−8	3				8–6
(Croatia) HAVK Mladost	3	0	0	3	18	30	−12	0				

==== Group B ====
Tournament was played in Valletta, Malta.

Team	Pld	W	D	L	GF	GA	GD	Pts	(Italy) VER	(Romania) ORA	(Montenegro) BUD	(Malta) VAL
(Italy) Verona	3	2	1	0	41	22	+19	7			11–6	
(Romania) Oradea	3	1	2	0	36	29	+7	5	11–11			18–11
(Montenegro) Budva	3	1	1	1	22	23	−1	4		7–7		
(Malta) Valletta	3	0	0	3	21	46	−25	0	5–19		5–9	

==== Group C ====
Tournament was played in Tbilisi, Georgia.

Team	Pld	W	D	L	GF	GA	GD	Pts	(Germany) WAS	(Hungary) OSC	(France) CNM	(Georgia (country)) LOK
(Germany) Waspo Hannover	3	2	1	0	28	24	+4	7			10–8	
(Hungary) OSC Budapest	3	1	2	0	32	20	+12	5	7–7			
(France) CN Marseille	3	1	1	1	35	29	+6	4		10–10		
(Georgia (country)) Lokomotiv Tbilisi	3	0	0	3	21	43	−22	0	9–11	3–15	9–17	

=== Qualification II ===
- 18–20 September

Sixteen teams took part in the Qualification round II. Nine teams from first round and seven teams with wild cards. These clubs formed four groups of four and had round robin tournaments at four host cities on 18–20 October. Top 2 of these groups advance to play-off (qualification round 3).

Key to colours in group tables
Progress to the Qualification Round III

==== Group D ====
Tournament was played in Athens, Greece.

Team	Pld	W	D	L	GF	GA	GD	Pts	(Hungary) OSC	(Italy) BRE	(Greece) VOU	(France) MON
(Hungary) OSC Budapest	3	2	1	0	29	17	+12	7			10–6	
(Italy) AN Brescia	3	2	1	0	27	22	+5	7	8–8			
(Greece) NC Vouliagmeni	3	1	0	2	21	26	−5	3		6–10		9–6
(France) Montpellier	3	0	0	3	17	29	−12	0	3–11	8–9		

==== Group E ====
Tournament was played in Hannover, Germany.

Team	Pld	W	D	L	GF	GA	GD	Pts	(Hungary) SZO	(Germany) WAS	(Serbia) RAD	(Montenegro) BUD
(Hungary) Szolnoki VSK	3	3	0	0	51	17	+34	9		11–10		
(Germany) Waspo Hannover	3	2	0	1	36	24	+12	6	10–11		14–7	12–6
(Serbia) VK Radnički	3	1	0	2	17	42	−25	3	2–21			8–7
(Montenegro) VK Budva	3	0	0	3	18	39	−21	0				

==== Group F ====
Tournament was played in Rijeka, Croatia.

Team	Pld	W	D	L	GF	GA	GD	Pts	(Croatia) PRI	(France) CNM	(Russia) SPA	(Germany) DUI
(Croatia) VK Primorje	3	3	0	0	45	27	+18	9		13–12	14–7	18–8
(France) CN Marseille	3	2	0	1	38	30	+8	6			14–9	
(Russia) Spartak Volgograd	3	0	1	2	30	42	−12	1				
(Germany) ASC Duisburg	3	0	1	2	30	44	−14	1		8–12	14–14	

==== Group G ====
Tournament was played in Busto Arsizio, Italy.

Team	Pld	W	D	L	GF	GA	GD	Pts	(Montenegro) JAD	(Romania) ORA	(Italy) VER	(Spain) SAB
(Montenegro) Jadran Carine	3	3	0	0	24	21	+3	9			10–9	
(Romania) Digi Oradea	3	2	0	1	29	21	+8	6	6–7			13–6
(Italy) SM Verona	3	1	0	2	27	29	−2	3		8–10		10–9
(Spain) CN Sabadell	3	0	0	3	21	30	−9	0	6–7			

=== Qualification III ===
- 3 October 2015: 1st match
- 17 October 2015: 2nd match

Key to colors
Seeded in qualification round III draw
Unseeded in qualification round III draw

Group	Winners	Runners-up
D	(Hungary) OSC Budapest	(Italy) AN Brescia
E	(Hungary) Szolnoki VSK	(Germany) Waspo Hannover
F	(Croatia) VK Primorje	(France) CN Marseille
G	(Montenegro) Jadran Carine	(Romania) Digi Oradea

Eight teams took part in the Qualification round III. These teams played against each other over two legs on a home-and-away basis. The mechanism of the draws for each round was as follow:

- In the draw for the Qualification round III, the four group winners were seeded, and the four group runners-up were unseeded. The seeded teams were drawn against the unseeded teams, with the seeded teams hosting the second leg. Teams from the same group could not be drawn against each other.

The first legs were played on 3 October, and the second legs were played on 17 October 2015.

Team 1	Agg.	Team 2	1st leg	2nd leg
VK Primorje (Croatia)	29–12	(Germany) Waspo Hannover	19–6	10–6
Digi Oradea (Romania)	10–19	(Hungary) OSC Budapest	7–9	3–10
CN Marseille (France)	12–20	(Hungary) Szolnoki VSK	6–7	6–13
Jadran Carine (Montenegro)	22–18	(Italy) AN Brescia	14–6	8–12

== Preliminary round ==
Location of teams of the 2015–16 LEN Champions League group stage.
Red: Group A; Blue: Group B.

Main article: 2015–16 LEN Champions League preliminary round

The regular season was played between 28 October 2015 and 18 May 2016. If teams are level on record at the end of the preliminary round, tiebreakers are applied in the following order:

1. Head-to-head record.
2. Head-to-head point differential.
3. Point differential during the Regular Season.
4. Points scored during the regular season.
5. Sum of quotients of points scored and points allowed in each Regular Season match.

In each group, teams played against each other home-and-away in a round-robin format. The matchdays were 28 October, 11 November, 28 November, 16 December 2015, 3 February, 10 February, 30 March, 16 April, 30 April, and 18 May 2016. The top three teams advanced to the final six.

The Final Six (quarterfinals, semifinals, third place game and final) were played in Budapest, Hungary from 2 to 4 June 2016.

=== Group A ===
Pos	Team	Pld	W	D	L	PF	PA	PD	Pts	Qualification	OLY	EGE	BAR	PRI	SPA	JAD
1	(Greece) Olympiacos	10	7	3	0	95	59	+36	24	Advance to semifinals	—	8–7	9–5	7–4	12–3	10–4
2	(Hungary) ZF Eger	10	4	4	2	90	80	+10	16	Advance to quarter-finals	8–8	—	6–5	12–12	10–7	8–7
3	(Spain) CNA Barceloneta	10	4	4	2	79	74	+5	16	Advance to quarter-finals	7–7	6–6	—	9–7	9–7	15–10
4	(Croatia) VK Primorje	10	4	3	3	91	83	+8	15	Eliminated	4–10	8–7	9–9	—	14–4	13–7
5	(Germany) Spandau 04	10	0	5	5	75	106	−31	5	Eliminated	11–11	8–15	8–8	9–9	—	9–9
6	(Montenegro) Jadran Carine	10	0	3	7	77	105	−28	3	Eliminated	6–13	11–11	5–6	9–11	9–9	—

Source: LEN

=== Group B ===
Pos	Team	Pld	W	D	L	PF	PA	PD	Pts	Qualification	REC	SZO	JUG	BUD	PAR	GAL
1	(Italy) Pro Recco	10	8	1	1	130	67	+63	25	Advance to semifinals	—	14–11	14–6	7–2	15–3	15–4
2	(Hungary) Szolnoki VSK	10	8	0	2	121	90	+31	24	Advance to quarter-finals	12–11	—	13–10	8–7	12–9	16–7
3	(Croatia) Jug Dubrovnik	10	7	1	2	105	83	+22	22	Advance to quarter-finals	5–5	10–9	—	10–7	12–4	17–8
4	(Hungary) OSC Budapest	10	3	0	7	75	84	−9	9	Eliminated	7–12	6–12	7–9	—	10–8	13–4
5	(Serbia) Partizan	10	2	1	7	69	112	−43	7	Eliminated	7–18	9–14	6–10	5–4	—	9–8
6	(Turkey) Galatasaray	10	0	1	9	76	140	−64	1	Eliminated	10–19	7–14	10–16	9–12	9–9	—

Source: LEN

== Final Six ==
Hajós Alfréd Nemzeti Sportuszoda, Budapest, Hungary

Quarterfinals; 2 June 2016
B2	(Hungary) Szolnoki VSK	7
A3	(Spain) CNA Barceloneta	5
A2	(Hungary) ZF Eger	6
B3	(Croatia) Jug Dubrovnik	8

Semifinals; 3 June 2016
A1	(Greece) Olympiacos	8
B2	(Hungary) Szolnoki VSK	7
B1	(Italy) Pro Recco	10^{(4)}
B3	(Croatia) Jug Dubrovnik	10^{(5)}
5th place
A3	(Spain) CNA Barceloneta	10
A2	(Hungary) ZF Eger	6

Final; 4 June 2016
A1	(Greece) Olympiacos	4
B3	(Croatia) Jug Dubrovnik	6
Third place
B2	(Hungary) Szolnoki VSK	11
B1	(Italy) Pro Recco	7

2015–16 LEN Champions League
Champions

Jug Dubrovnik
4st title
Marko Bijac, Marko Bautovic, Hrvonje Benic, Ivo Brailo, Cristijan Kulina, Loren Fatović, Javier García, Toni Jarak, Maro Jokovic, Filip Krzic, Luka Lončar, Marko Ivankovic, Marko Macan, Jacob Mercep, Paulo Obradovic, Nikola Pavlicevic, Pavo Markovic, Toni Popadic, Josip Vrlic, Felipe Perrone
Head coach
Vjekoslav Kobešćak

=== Final standings ===
	Team
	(Croatia) Jug Dubrovnik
Silver medal	(Greece) Olympiacos
Bronze medal	(Hungary) Szolnok
4	(Italy) Pro Recco
5	(Spain) CNA Barceloneta
6	(Hungary) ZF Eger

=== Awards ===
Player of the Season	Top Scorer	Player of the Final Six	Goalkeeper of the Final Six
(Serbia) Filip Filipović (Pro Recco)	(Hungary) Denes Varga (Szolnok) 33 goals	(Spain) Felipe Perrone (Jug Dubrovnik)	(Croatia) Marko Bijac (Jug Dubrovnik)

Total 7 of the Season
LW	(Greece) Ioannis Fountoulis (Olympiacos)	CF	(Croatia) Luka Lončar (Jug Dubrovik)	RW	(Croatia) Maro Joković (Szolnok)
LD	(Spain) Felipe Perrone (Jug Dubrovik)	CB	(Serbia) Milan Aleksić (Szolnok)	RD	(Serbia) Filip Filipović (Pro Recco)
GK	(Croatia) Marko Bijač (Jug Dubrovik)				

== See also ==
- 2015–16 LEN Euro Cup
