= Dynamo Alma-Ata =

Sports club in Almaty, Kazakhstan

Dynamo Alma-Ata (Russian: Динамо Алма-Ата) was a multi-sports club from the then capital of Kazakhstan, Almaty in the Soviet era. The club participated in wrestling, gymnastics, athletics, water polo, bandy, and the most successful branch, hockey. Several players combined bandy in the winter with hockey in the summer.

== Notables ==
Well-known members included the competitive artistic gymnast Valeri Liukin, the pole vaulter Grigoriy Yegorov, as well as the wrestlers Anatoly Nazarenko, Shamil Serikov and Anatoly Bykov. The co-founder of FC Spartak Moscow, Nikolai Starostin, coached both the football and hockey teams during his exile in Alma-Ata.

== Sports ==
=== Water polo ===
The water polo men's team won Soviet Water Polo Championships in 1981 and 1982. In the 1982–83 season Dynamo's water polo team reached the European Champions cup final. Dynamo played a double final against Spandau 04 but after a 10:7 win in the first leg, the Soviet team lost the title, defeated by the West Germans in the second leg with a 6:10 score.

=== Bandy ===
In 1977 and in 1990, the club became Soviet national champions in bandy and in 1978 won the European Cup.

=== Hockey ===
The team became Soviet champions eighteen times.
