= 1965 European Cup (water polo) =

The 1965 Water Polo European Cup was the second edition of LEN's premier competition for male water polo clubs, running from February to April 1965. Pro Recco, which hosted the final stage, won all three games to win its first title, while defending champions Partizan Belgrade was the runner-up.

== Semifinal stage ==
Pos	Team	Pld	W	D	L	GF	GA	GD	Pts
1	(Soviet Union) CSKA Moscow	3	2	1	0	13	7	+6	5
2	(East Germany) Dynamo Magdeburg	3	2	1	0	15	10	+5	5
3	(Romania) Dinamo Bucharest	3	1	0	2	10	13	−3	2
4	(Hungary) Szolnoki	3	0	0	3	7	15	−8	0

Pos	Team	Pld	W	D	L	GF	GA	GD	Pts
1	(Socialist Federal Republic of Yugoslavia) Partizan Belgrade	2	2	0	0	12	2	+10	4
2	(Italy) Pro Recco	2	1	0	1	6	5	+1	2
3	(Spain) Barcelona	1	0	0	1	2	13	−11	0
4	(Germany) Rote Erde Hamm (withdrew)	0	–	–	–	–	–	—	0

== Final stage ==
Pos	Team	Pld	W	D	L	GF	GA	GD	Pts
1	(Italy) Pro Recco	3	3	0	0	11	8	+3	6
2	(Socialist Federal Republic of Yugoslavia) Partizan Belgrade	3	2	0	1	10	5	+5	4
3	(East Germany) Dynamo Magdeburg	3	0	1	2	10	13	−3	1
4	(Soviet Union) CSKA Moscow	3	0	1	2	10	15	−5	1

1965 Water Polo European Cup
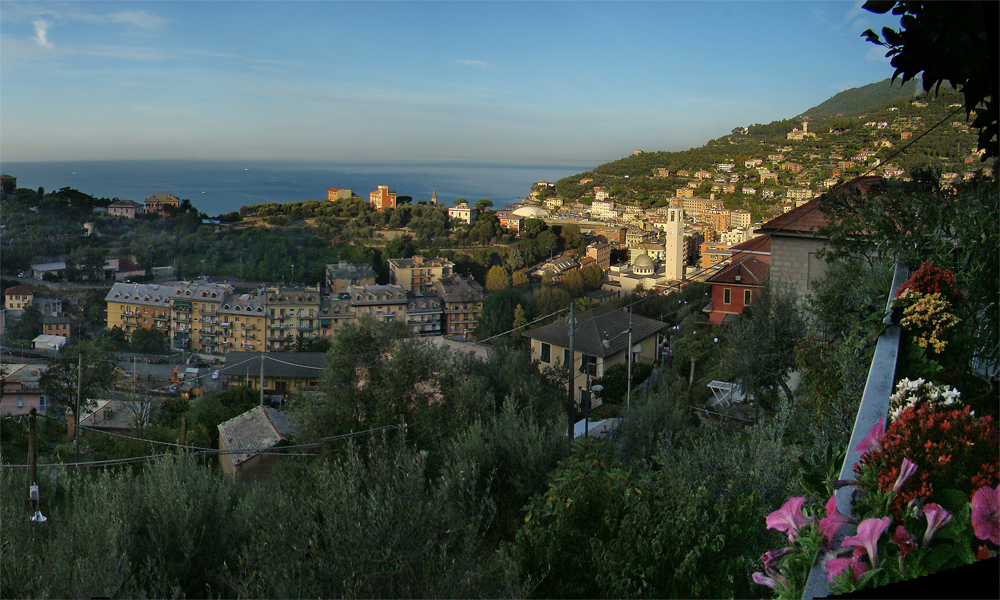
(Italy) Pro Recco
First title
