= 1984–85 European Cup (water polo) =

- League: European Cup
- Sport: Water polo
- Duration: to
- Number of teams: 8 (quarter-finals)
- Finals champions: (Hungary) Vasas (2nd title)
- Runners-up: (Soviet Union) CSKA Moscow

European Cup seasons
- ← 1983–84 1985-86 →

The 1984–85 LEN European Cup was the 22nd edition of LEN's premier competition for men's water polo clubs.

== Group stage ==
Key to colors in group tables
Group winners and runners-up advanced to the Semi-finals

=== Group A ===
Team	Pld	W	D	L	GF	GA	GD	Pts
(Socialist Federal Republic of Yugoslavia) Partizan	2	2	0	0	22	17	+5	4
(Hungary) Vasas	2	1	0	1	25	20	+5	2
(Turkey) İstanbul YİK	4	2	0	2	17	27	−10	4

=== Group B ===
Team	Pld	W	D	L	GF	GA	GD	Pts
(West Germany) Spandau 04	3	2	1	0	30	26	+4	5
(Soviet Union) CSKA Moscow	3	1	2	0	31	28	+3	4
(Italy) Pro Recco	3	1	1	1	34	32	+2	3
(Czechoslovakia) ČH Košice	3	0	0	3	25	34	−9	0

== Semi-finals ==
Team 1	Agg.	Team 2	1st leg	2nd leg
Spandau 04 (West Germany)	17–18	(Hungary) Vasas	8–8	9–10
CSKA Moscow (Soviet Union)	14–13	(Socialist Federal Republic of Yugoslavia) Partizan	8–7	6–6

== Finals ==
Team 1	Agg.	Team 2	1st leg	2nd leg
CSKA Moscow (Soviet Union)	16–21	(Hungary) Vasas	11–11	5–10

1984–85 LEN European Cup
champions
(Hungary) Vasas
2nd title

== See also ==
- 1984–85 LEN Cup Winners' Cup
