= 1991 European Cup (water polo) =

Water polo tournament

The 1991 European Water Polo Champions' Cup was the 28th edition of the premier competition for European men's water polo teams. Defending champion Mladost Zagreb defeated Canottieri Napoli in the final to win its sixth title, tying with as the competition's most successful team.

== Quarterfinals ==
Team #1	Agg.	Team #2	1st	2nd
Mladost Zagreb (Socialist Federal Republic of Yugoslavia)	17–16	(Netherlands) Polar Bears Ede	8–6	9–10
Glyfada (Greece)	10–21	(Soviet Union) CSKA Moscow	7–7	3–14
Spandau 04 (Germany)	23–19	(Bulgaria) Lokomotiv Sofia	13–9	10–10
Cercle Marseille (France)	17–20	(Italy) Canottieri Napoli	12–8	5–12

== Semifinals ==
Team #1	Agg.	Team #2	1st	2nd
Mladost Zagreb (Socialist Federal Republic of Yugoslavia)	19–15	(Soviet Union) CSKA Moscow	10–9	9–6
Spandau 04 (Germany)	15–19	(Italy) Canottieri Napoli	8–9	7–10

== Final ==
Team #1	Agg.	Team #2	1st	2nd
Mladost Zagreb (Socialist Federal Republic of Yugoslavia)	21–17	(Italy) Canottieri Napoli	10–7	11–10

1991 European Water Polo Champions' Cup Champion
(Socialist Federal Republic of Yugoslavia) Mladost Zagreb
Sixth title
