= Dutch Women's Water Polo Championship =

Premier championship for women's water polo in the Netherlands

The Dutch Women's Water Polo Championship is the premier championship for women's water polo clubs in the Netherlands. First held in 1920, it is currently contested by twelve teams. As of 2012 it is granted one spot in the Champions' Cup and two in the LEN Trophy.

== 2011-12 teams ==
- (South Holland) ZPC Barendrecht
- (Utrecht (province)) BZC Brandenburg
- (South Holland) GZC Donk
- (South Holland) ZPC De Gouwe
- (North Holland) ZV Haarlem
- (North Holland) ZV De Ham
- (Overijssel) ZPC Het Ravijn
- (South Holland) ZVL Leiden
- (North Holland) ZWV Nereus
- (Gelderland) EZC Polar Bears
- (North Brabant) PSV Eindhoven
- (Utrecht (province)) UZSC Utrecht

== Champions ==
- (North Holland) HZC De Robben (29)
  - 1946, 1947, 1949, 1950, 1951, 1952, 1953, 1954, 1955, 1956, 1957, 1958, 1959, 1960, 1961, 1962, 1963, 1964, 1965, 1966, 1967, 1968, 1969, 1970, 1971, 1972, 1973, 1974, 1975
- (South Holland) HZ Zian (11)
  - 1928, 1929, 1930, 1931, 1935, 1936, 1937, 1939, 1940, 1941, 1943
- (North Holland) ZWV Nereus (9)
  - 1989, 1993, 1994, 1995, 1996, 1997, 2001, 2023, 2024
- (South Holland) GZC Donk (9)
  - 1985, 1987, 1988, 1990, 1992, 1998, 1999, 2005, 2011
- (North Holland) HDZ Amsterdam (8)
  - 1920, 1921, 1922, 1923, 1926, 1927, 1933, 1934
- (North Holland) ZPC De Otters Het Gooi (6)
  - 1979, 1980, 1981, 1982, 1983, 1984
- (Gelderland) Polar Bears Ede (5)
  - 2002, 2004, 2007, 2009, 2010
- (Overijssel) ZPC Het Ravijn (4)
  - 2000, 2003, 2008, 2012
- (South Holland) RDZ Rotterdam (3)
  - 1924, 1925, 1932
- (South Holland) DSZ Den Haag (3)
  - 1976, 1977, 1978
- (Utrecht (province)) BZC Brandenburg (2)
  - 1991, 2006
- (North Holland) ADZ Amsterdam (1)
  - 1938
- (Utrecht (province)) UZSC Utrecht (1)
  - 1942
- (Utrecht (province)) ZC De Vuursche (1)
  - 1986
