= ASC Duisburg =

ASC Duisburg (Amateur-Schwimm-Club Duisburg), or simply Duisburg is a sports club based in the city of Duisburg, in Germany. The water polo team is among the strongest in Germany and also, ASC has a large swimming department. The "amateurs" were a total of six German water polo champions and four German water polo Cup winners.

== History ==
ASC Duisburg was founded in 1909. Currently the club has approximately 3,700 members, making it one of the largest swimming clubs in Germany. The club facility in Duisburg Sports Park is about two acres. In addition, the club has a heated 50-meter swimming pool. Members can also take advantage of the Barbarasee for swimming.

== Water polo team ==
ASC Duisburg plays in the German water polo league (Deutsche Wasserball-Liga). In recent years, the "amateurs" were regularly in the top group of the league and were the 2013 league and cup double break the longstanding dominance of Spandau 04. Already in 2010, the Cup win was after a waiting period of more than twenty years.

The club have won 6 times the national league (1957, 1963, 1965, 1967, 1968, 2013). In the national cup competition, which was introduced in 1972 and first held in Duisburg, ASC have won the trophy at the 1972, 1989, 2010 and 2013 seasons (4).

Duisburg was the first West German water polo club that reached the semifinals of the European Champions cup (1963-64 season).

=== Former coaches ===
- (Romania) Julius Kapsa (1991–1998)
