= HZ Zian =

Haagse Zwem Zian (in English: Hague's swimming (club) Zian) or shortly Zian is a swimming and water polo club from The Hague, Netherlands. The association organizes swimming lessons and also has sections for the competition in sports like water polo, diving and swimming competition.

== History ==
HZ Zian emerged from HZ&PC and Zian / Vitesse. Hague Swimming and Polo Club (HZ&PC) was established on November 29, 1911. Zian / Vitesse was founded on October 4, 1922. In the past, there are several Dutch Championships achieved. HZ Zian participates in the Dutch national league. The greatest moment in the history of the club is the participation in the 1976-77 European champions cup final where Zian defeated by the Soviet giant CSKA Moscow with a 7–5 score. Next to this golden moment is the two years before and also lost LEN Cup Winners' Cup final against the Hungarian Ferencváros, at the 1974–75 season.

== Honours ==
=== Women's water polo ===
Domestic

Dutch League

- Winners (11): 1927–28, 1928–29, 1929–30, 1930–31, 1934–35, 1935–36, 1936–37, 1938–39, 1939–40, 1940–41, 1942–43
