= 1964 LEN European Cup =

Water polo tournament

The 1964 Water Polo European Cup was the inaugural edition of LEN's premier competition for men's water polo clubs. The competition consisted of two round-robin stages, and it was contested by fifteen national champions. The first stage was held February 21–23, and it comprised a nine-team group in Naples and a six-team group in Magdeburg. The final stage, held in March, was originally planned to be contested by the two top teams from each group, but LEN later expanded it to six teams. Partizan won all five games to win the championship, while Dynamo Moscow was the runner-up.

== Preliminary round losers ==
- (Austria) WSU
- (Belgium) Gent
- (Bulgaria) CSKA Sofia
- (Spain) Barcelona
- (France) Strasbourg
- (Greece) Ethnikos Piraeus
- (Hungary) Ferencváros (withdrew)
- (Netherlands) Amersfoort
- (Romania) Koriche

== Final round ==
Pos	Team	Pld	W	D	L	GF	GA	GD	Pts
1	(Socialist Federal Republic of Yugoslavia) Partizan	5	5	0	0	27	9	+18	10
2	(Soviet Union) Dynamo Moscow	5	4	0	1	29	15	+14	8
3	(East Germany) Dynamo Magdeburg	5	3	0	2	33	21	+12	6
4	(West Germany) ASC Duisburg	5	2	0	3	19	26	−7	4
5	(Italy) Napoli	5	1	0	4	11	25	−14	2
6	(Poland) Legia Warsaw	5	0	0	5	13	36	−23	0

1964 LEN European Cup champions

Partizan
1st title
