= HZC De Robben =

HZC De Robben (Hilversum Zwem Club De Robben) is a swimming club in Hilversum, Netherlands. The association organizes swimming lessons and also has sections for the competition sports water polo and swimming competitions. HZC De Robben uses the pool Lieberg. The club's colors are blue and orange.

== History ==
De Robben was founded on January 1, 1971. HZC De Robben is the result of the merger of the Hilversum Zwem Club (HZC) which was established on August 24, 1932 and De Robben which founded on 15 October 1940. One of the most famous coaches was Jan Stender, who because of his shaggy hair on the chest and back and his approach also known as 'Gorilla'. The water polo department has won many Dutch Championships (11) also supplied the association for many internationals Dutch water polo team. For the season 2014-2015 the association is a Start Community entered into with BZC Brandenburg which Ilse van der Meijden was appointed as head coach.

== Titles & achievements ==
=== Men ===
Domestic competitions

Dutch League

- Winners (11): 1959-60, 1966-67, 1967-68, 1968-69, 1969-70, 1970-71, 1971-72, 1973-74, 1974-75, 1979-80, 1981-82

Dutch Cup (KZNB)

- Winners (2): 1985-86, 2000-01

European competitions

LEN Champions League

- 4th place (1): 1971-72, 1974-75, 1975-76

=== Women ===
Domestic competitions

Dutch League

- Winners (29): 1945–46, 1946–47, 1948–49, 1949–50, 1950–51, 1951–52, 1952–53, 1953–54, 1954–55, 1955–56, 1956–57, 1957–58, 1958–59, 1959–60, 1960–61, 1961–62, 1962–63, 1963–64, 1964–65, 1965–66, 1966–67, 1967–68, 1968–69, 1969–70, 1970–71, 1971–72, 1972–73, 1973–74, 1974–75
