= AN Brescia =

Italian sports club

- Founded: 1973; 53 years ago
- League: Serie A1
- Based in: Brescia, Italy
- Arena: Centro Natatorio Mompiano (Capacity: 800)
- Colors
- President: Andrea Malchiodi
- Head coach: Alessandro Bovo
- Championships: 4 LEN Euro Cup; 2 Italian Leagues; 2 Italian Cups
- Website: anbrescia.it

Associazione Nuotatori Brescia (Swimmers Association Brescia) is an Italian sports club based in Brescia, that is interested exclusively in water sports like swimming and water polo.

== History ==
The club founded in 1973 under the name "AN Brescia" and in 1995 took the name "Leonessa Nuoto Pallanuoto". In 2007 the name changed again becoming "Brixia Leonessa Nuoto". Finally in 2011, following a corporate crisis, summarizes the old name of "AN Brescia".

The swimming area had made well-known swimmers famous, such as Giorgio Lamberti, who won the title in the 100, 200 and 400m freestyle at the Italian and European championships. He was best remembered for the world title in Perth and held the world record in Berlin in the 200 with a time of 1 min. 46 sec. and 69, remained unbeaten for ten years.

In the water polo department, the successes of the club have a recent history, came following the entry of the group System as the main sponsor. In 2001, arrives for the first time in its history in LEN Cup final, but was defeated by the Croatian Mladost. A trophy that is put on the bulletin board in later because in five years, between 2002 and 2006, Systema Leonessa manages to win three LEN Cups (beating in the final Pro Recco and Florentia in two derby all Italians and the Russians of Sintez Kazan). Brescia gets its first Italian champions title in 2003, beating Pro Recco. Since 2006 the team, alongside the usual sponsor "Systema", had a new sponsor, "Pompea". Since 2008, the team is called Brixia Leonessa Brescia or Pompea Brixia Leonessa. In 2008 reaches for the second time the championship final, but lost against Pro Recco. In 2009, the team returns to be sponsored by "Systema".

In 2011 for the first time, Brescia reached the Italian Cup final, but lost to the defending champions of the Pro Recco; takes his revenge in 2012, winning the trophy. In the same year it received the third championship final, again versus the "Ligurians", but was defeated.

== Honours ==
=== Domestic competitions ===
- Serie A1
  - Winners (2): 2002–03, 2020–21
- Coppa Italia
  - Winners (2): 2011–12, 2023–24

=== European competitions ===
- LEN Euro Cup
  - Winners (4): 2001–02, 2002–03, 2005–06, 2015–16
  - Runners-up (1): 2000–01

== Recent seasons ==
As of 2025

Season	Tier	League	Pos.	Domestic cup	European competitions	
2000–01	1	Serie A1	6th	not held		
2001–02	1	Serie A1	3rd	not held	3 LEN Cup	C
2002–03	1	Serie A1	1st	not held	3 LEN Cup	C
2003–04	1	Serie A1	3rd	not held		
2004–05	1	Serie A1	4th		1 Euroleague	QF
2005–06	1	Serie A1	3rd		2 LEN Cup	C
2006–07	1	Serie A1	3rd		LEN Super Cup	F
2006–07	1	Serie A1	3rd		1 Euroleague	QF
2007–08	1	Serie A1	2nd		1 Euroleague	PR
2008–09	1	Serie A1	4th	Third place	1 Euroleague	PR
2009–10	1	Serie A1	3rd	Third place	2 LEN Cup	SF
2010–11	1	Serie A1	5th	Runner-up	1 Euroleague	QR2
2011–12	1	Serie A1	2nd	Champion		
2012–13	1	Serie A1	2nd	Third place	1 Champions League	R16
2013–14	1	Serie A1	2nd	Runner-up	1 Champions League	5th
2014–15	1	Serie A1	2nd	Runner-up	1 Champions League	PR
2015–16	1	Serie A1	2nd	Runner-up	1 Champions League	QR3
2015–16	1	Serie A1	2nd	Runner-up	2 Euro Cup	C
2016–17	1	Serie A1	2nd	Runner-up	LEN Super Cup	F
2016–17	1	Serie A1	2nd	Runner-up	1 Champions League	5th
2017–18	1	Serie A1	2nd	Runner-up	1 Champions League	7th
2018–19	1	Serie A1	2nd	Runner-up	1 Champions League	6th
2019–20	1	Serie A1	2nd^{1}	Cancalled^{1}	1 Champions League	—^{1}
2020–21	1	Serie A1	1st	Runner-up	1 Champions League	3rd
2021–22	1	Serie A1	2nd	Runner-up	1 Champions League	4th
2022–23	1	Serie A1	2nd	Third place	1 Champions League	8th
2023–24	1	Serie A1	3rd	Champion	1 Champions League	QFR
2024–25	1	Serie A1	2nd	Third place	1 Champions League	QR
2024–25	1	Serie A1	2nd	Third place	2 Euro Cup	QF

^1 Cancelled due to the COVID-19 pandemic.

== Famous players ==
- (Croatia) (Italy) Goran Volarević
- (Italy) Francesco Di Fulvio
- (Serbia) Aleksandar Ćirić
- (Spain) Guillermo Molina
- (Serbia) Sava Ranđelović
- (Serbia) Nemanja Ubović
- (Croatia) Maro Joković
- (Greece) Angelos Vlachopoulos

== Famous coaches ==
- (Serbia) Mirko Blažević
