= European Aquatics Champions League =

European water polo club competition

- Current season, competition or edition: 2026–27 European Aquatics Champions League
- Formerly: European Cup; Euroleague
- Sport: Water polo
- Founded: 1963; 63 years ago
- President: Paolo Barelli
- No. of teams: 24 (preliminary stage); 16 (group stage)
- Country: LEN members
- Continent: Europe
- Most recent champion: (Spain) Atlètic-Barceloneta (2nd title)
- Most titles: (Italy) Pro Recco (11 titles)
- Level on pyramid: 1st Tier (Europe)
- Website: championsleague.len.eu

The European Aquatics Champions League is the top-tier European professional water polo club competition with teams from up to 18 countries. It is organized by the Ligue Européenne de Natation.

The competition started in 1963 as European Cup. A change of name and format occurred in 1996, with the competition being renamed Champions League and the final four system being established as the format of choice, for the first time during the 1996–97 LEN Champions League. From 2003 to 2011 the competition was named LEN Euroleague (with the change of name being simply a re-branding) and from 2011 to 2024 was named the LEN Champions League. From 2024, after LEN was renamed to European Aquatics, the new name is the European Aquatics Champions League.

LEN Champions League is the most popular water polo league in the European continent. It has been won by 24 clubs, 10 of which have won the title more than once. The most successful club in the competition is Pro Recco, with eleven titles. The current European champion is Ferencváros, who won their second title after defeating Pro Recco in the 2023–24 LEN Champions League Final in Valletta.

== History ==
=== Names of the competition ===
- 1963–1996: European Cup
- 1996–2003: Champions League
- 2003–2011: LEN Euroleague
- 2011–2024: LEN Champions League
- 2024–present: European Aquatics Champions League

== Title holders ==

- 1963–64 (Socialist Federal Republic of Yugoslavia) Partizan
- 1964–65 (Italy) Pro Recco
- 1965–66 (Socialist Federal Republic of Yugoslavia) Partizan
- 1966–67 (Socialist Federal Republic of Yugoslavia) Partizan
- 1967–68 (Socialist Federal Republic of Yugoslavia) Mladost
- 1968–69 (Socialist Federal Republic of Yugoslavia) Mladost
- 1969–70 (Socialist Federal Republic of Yugoslavia) Mladost
- 1970–71 (Socialist Federal Republic of Yugoslavia) Partizan
- 1971–72 (Socialist Federal Republic of Yugoslavia) Mladost
- 1972–73 (Hungary) OSC Budapest
- 1973–74 (Soviet Union) MGU Moscow
- 1974–75 (Socialist Federal Republic of Yugoslavia) Partizan
- 1975–76 (Socialist Federal Republic of Yugoslavia) Partizan
- 1976–77 (Soviet Union) CSK VMF Moscow
- 1977–78 (Italy) Canottieri Napoli
- 1978–79 (Hungary) OSC Budapest
- 1979–80 (Hungary) Vasas
- 1980–81 (Socialist Federal Republic of Yugoslavia) Jug Dubrovnik
- 1981–82 (Spain) Barcelona
- 1982–83 (West Germany) Spandau 04
- 1983–84 (Italy) Stefanel Recco
- 1984–85 (Hungary) Vasas
- 1985–86 (West Germany) Spandau 04
- 1986–87 (West Germany) Spandau 04
- 1987–88 (Italy) Sisley Pescara
- 1988–89 (West Germany) Spandau 04
- 1989–90 (Socialist Federal Republic of Yugoslavia) Mladost
- 1990–91 (Socialist Federal Republic of Yugoslavia) Mladost
- 1991–92 (Croatia) Jadran Split
- 1992–93 (Croatia) Jadran Split
- 1993–94 (Hungary) Újpest
- 1994–95 (Spain) Catalunya
- 1995–96 (Croatia) Mladost
- 1996–97 (Italy) Posillipo
- 1997–98 (Italy) Posillipo
- 1998–99 (Croatia) POŠK
- 1999–00 (Serbia) Bečej
- 2000–01 (Croatia) Jug Dubrovnik
- 2001–02 (Greece) Olympiacos Piraeus
- 2002–03 (Italy) Pro Recco
- 2003–04 (Hungary) Honvéd
- 2004–05 (Italy) Posillipo
- 2005–06 (Croatia) Jug Dubrovnik
- 2006–07 (Italy) Pro Recco
- 2007–08 (Italy) Pro Recco
- 2008–09 (Montenegro) Primorac Kotor
- 2009–10 (Italy) Pro Recco
- 2010–11 (Serbia) Partizan
- 2011–12 (Italy) Pro Recco
- 2012–13 (Serbia) Crvena zvezda
- 2013–14 (Spain) Atlètic-Barceloneta
- 2014–15 (Italy) Pro Recco
- 2015–16 (Croatia) Jug Dubrovnik
- 2016–17 (Hungary) Szolnok
- 2017–18 (Greece) Olympiacos Piraeus
- 2018–19 (Hungary) Ferencváros
- 2019–20 Cancelled due to the COVID-19 pandemic
- 2020–21 (Italy) Pro Recco
- 2021–22 (Italy) Pro Recco
- 2022–23 (Italy) Pro Recco
- 2023–24 (Hungary) Ferencváros
- 2024–25 (Hungary) Ferencváros
- 2025–26 (Spain) Atlètic-Barceloneta

== Finals ==
Final Four
Year	Final			Semi-finalists	
Year	Champion	Score	Runner-up	Third place	Fourth place
1963–64; Details	(Socialist Federal Republic of Yugoslavia); Partizan	4–3	(Soviet Union); Dynamo Moscow	(East Germany); Dynamo Magdeburg	(West Germany); ASC Duisburg
1964–65; Details	(Italy); Pro Recco	1–0	(Socialist Federal Republic of Yugoslavia); Partizan	(East Germany); Dynamo Magdeburg	(Soviet Union); CSK VMF Moscow
1965–66; Details	(Socialist Federal Republic of Yugoslavia); Partizan	8–7 (5–3 / 3–4)	(East Germany); Dynamo Magdeburg	(Italy); Pro Recco	(Soviet Union); CSK VMF Moscow
1966–67; Details	(Socialist Federal Republic of Yugoslavia); Partizan	10–8 (5–3 / 1–2 / 4–3)	(Italy); Pro Recco	(East Germany); Dynamo Magdeburg	(Romania); Dinamo București
1967–68; Details	(Socialist Federal Republic of Yugoslavia); Mladost	8–6 (4–2 / 4–4)	(Romania); Dinamo București	(Soviet Union); CSK VMF Moscow	(Italy); Pro Recco
1968–69; Details	(Socialist Federal Republic of Yugoslavia); Mladost	11–7 (7–3 / 4–4)	(Soviet Union); Dynamo Moscow	(East Germany); Dynamo Magdeburg	(Socialist Federal Republic of Yugoslavia); Partizan
1969–70; Details	(Socialist Federal Republic of Yugoslavia); Mladost	7–6 (5–3 / 2–3)	(Italy); Pro Recco	(Spain); Barcelona	(Hungary); OSC Budapest
1970–71; Details	(Socialist Federal Republic of Yugoslavia); Partizan	4–4	(Socialist Federal Republic of Yugoslavia); Mladost	(Soviet Union); Dynamo Moscow	(Sweden); Stockholm
1971–72; Details	(Socialist Federal Republic of Yugoslavia); Mladost	4–2	(Italy); Pro Recco	(Soviet Union); Dynamo Moscow	(Netherlands); De Robben
1972–73; Details	(Hungary); OSC Budapest	5–4	(Socialist Federal Republic of Yugoslavia); Partizan	(Soviet Union); CSK VMF Moscow	(Romania); Dinamo București
1973–74; Details	(Soviet Union); MGU Moscow	4–3	(Hungary); OSC Budapest	(Socialist Federal Republic of Yugoslavia); Partizan	(Italy); Canottieri Napoli
1974–75; Details	(Socialist Federal Republic of Yugoslavia); Partizan	6–2	(Hungary); OSC Budapest	(Romania); Dinamo București	(Netherlands); De Robben
1975–76; Details	(Socialist Federal Republic of Yugoslavia); Partizan	6–5	(Hungary); Vasas	(Italy); Canottieri Napoli	(Netherlands); De Robben
1976–77; Details	(Soviet Union); CSK VMF Moscow	7–5	(Netherlands); Zian	(West Germany); Würzburg 05	(Socialist Federal Republic of Yugoslavia); Partizan
1977–78; Details	(Italy); Canottieri Napoli	5–5	(Soviet Union); CSK VMF Moscow	(Socialist Federal Republic of Yugoslavia); Partizan	(West Germany); Würzburg 05
1978–79; Details	(Hungary); OSC Budapest	5–2	(Spain); Montjuïc	(West Germany); Würzburg 05	(Italy); Pro Recco
1979–80; Details	(Hungary); Vasas	9–7	(Socialist Federal Republic of Yugoslavia); Partizan	(West Germany); Spandau 04	(Spain); Montjuïc
1980–81; Details	(Socialist Federal Republic of Yugoslavia); Jug Dubrovnik	6–4	(West Germany); Spandau 04	(Hungary); Vasas	(Greece); Ethnikos Piraeus
1981–82; Details	(Spain); Barcelona	12–11	(West Germany); Spandau 04	(Hungary); Vasas	(Netherlands); Alphen
1982–83; Details	(West Germany); Spandau 04	17–16 (7–10 / 10–6)	(Soviet Union); Dynamo Alma-Ata	(Hungary); Vasas	(Italy); Pro Recco
1983–84; Details	(Italy); Pro Recco	16–15 (8–10 / 8–5)	(Netherlands); Alphen	(Socialist Federal Republic of Yugoslavia); Jug Dubrovnik	(West Germany); Spandau 04
1984–85; Details	(Hungary); Vasas	21–16 (11–11 / 10–5)	(Soviet Union); CSK VMF Moscow	(West Germany); Spandau 04	(Socialist Federal Republic of Yugoslavia); Partizan
1985–86; Details	(West Germany); Spandau 04	14–13 (7–9 / 7–4)	(Hungary); BVSC	(Spain); Montjuïc	(Socialist Federal Republic of Yugoslavia); Jug Dubrovnik
1986–87; Details	(West Germany); Spandau 04	17–13 (10–5 / 7–8)	(Soviet Union); Dynamo Moscow	(Socialist Federal Republic of Yugoslavia); Primorac Kotor	(Hungary); Újpest
1987–88; Details	(Italy); Pescara	21–19 (12–10 / 9–9)	(West Germany); Spandau 04	(Romania); Dinamo București	(Socialist Federal Republic of Yugoslavia); Partizan
1988–89; Details	(West Germany); Spandau 04	22–21 (11–10 / 11–11)	(Spain); Catalunya	(Socialist Federal Republic of Yugoslavia); Partizan	(Hungary); Ferencváros
1989–90; Details	(Socialist Federal Republic of Yugoslavia); Mladost	20–19 (9–10 / 11–9)	(West Germany); Spandau 04	(Hungary); Vasas	(Soviet Union); CSK VMF Moscow
1990–91; Details	(Socialist Federal Republic of Yugoslavia); Mladost	21–17 (10–7 / 11–10)	(Italy); Canottieri Napoli	(Soviet Union); CSK VMF Moscow	(Germany); Spandau 04
1991–92; Details	(Croatia); Jadran Split	21–20 (10–12 / 11–8)	(Italy); Savona	(Netherlands); Polar Bears Ede	(Germany); Spandau 04
1992–93; Details	(Croatia); Jadran Split	13–12 (7–8 / 6–4)	(Croatia); Mladost	(France); Olympic Nice	(Netherlands); Polar Bears Ede
1993–94; Details	(Hungary); Újpest	21–17 (10–6 / 11–11)	(Spain); Catalunya	(Italy); Posillipo	(Croatia); Jadran Split
1994–95; Details	(Spain); Catalunya	15–13 (7–6 / 8–7)	(Hungary); Újpest	(Croatia); Mladost	(Germany); Spandau 04
1995–96; Details	(Croatia); Mladost	13–10 (7–4 / 6–6)	(Hungary); Újpest	(Spain); Barcelona	(Italy); Posillipo
1996–97; Details	(Italy); Posillipo	10–7	(Croatia); Mladost	(Spain); Barcelona	(Federal Republic of Yugoslavia); Bečej
1997–98; Details	(Italy); Posillipo	8–6	(Italy); Pescara	(Croatia); Mladost	(Russia); Spartak Volgograd
1998–99; Details	(Croatia); POŠK	8–7	(Federal Republic of Yugoslavia); Bečej	(Russia); Dynamo Moscow	(Italy); Posillipo
1999–00; Details	(Federal Republic of Yugoslavia); Bečej	11–8	(Croatia); Mladost	(Hungary); BVSC	(Croatia); POŠK
2000–01; Details	(Croatia); Jug Dubrovnik	8–7	(Greece); Olympiacos Piraeus	(Italy); Posillipo	(Federal Republic of Yugoslavia); Bečej
2001–02; Details	(Greece); Olympiacos Piraeus	9–7	(Hungary); Honvéd	(Italy); Posillipo	(Croatia); Jug Dubrovnik
2002–03; Details	(Italy); Pro Recco	9–4	(Hungary); Honvéd	(Croatia); Mladost	(Germany); Spandau 04
2003–04; Details	(Hungary); Honvéd	7–6	(Serbia and Montenegro); Jadran Herceg Novi	(Croatia); Primorje	(Russia); Shturm 2002
2004–05; Details	(Italy); Posillipo	9–8	(Hungary); Honvéd	(Italy); Pro Recco	(Croatia); Jug Dubrovnik
2005–06; Details	(Croatia); Jug Dubrovnik	9–7	(Italy); Pro Recco	(Italy); Posillipo	(Italy); Savona
2006–07; Details	(Italy); Pro Recco	9–8	(Croatia); Jug Dubrovnik	(Serbia); Partizan	(Greece); Olympiacos Piraeus
2007–08; Details	(Italy); Pro Recco	13–12	(Croatia); Jug Dubrovnik	(Hungary); Vasas	(Croatia); Mladost
2008–09; Details	(Montenegro); Primorac Kotor	8–7	(Italy); Pro Recco	(Croatia); Jug Dubrovnik	(Croatia); Mladost
2009–10; Details	(Italy); Pro Recco	9–3	(Montenegro); Primorac Kotor	(Serbia); Partizan	(Croatia); Jug Dubrovnik
2010–11; Details	(Serbia); Partizan	11–7	(Italy); Pro Recco	(Croatia); Mladost	(Montenegro); Budva
2011–12; Details	(Italy); Pro Recco	11–8	(Croatia); Primorje	(Croatia); Mladost	(Hungary); Vasas
2012–13; Details	(Serbia); Crvena zvezda	8–7	(Croatia); Jug Dubrovnik	(Spain); Atlètic-Barceloneta	(Serbia); Partizan
2013–14; Details	(Spain); Atlètic-Barceloneta	7–6	(Serbia); Radnički Kragujevac	(Croatia); Primorje	(Serbia); Partizan
2014–15; Details	(Italy); Pro Recco	8–7	(Croatia); Primorje	(Spain); Atlètic-Barceloneta	(Croatia); Jug Dubrovnik
2015–16; Details	(Croatia); Jug Dubrovnik	6–4	(Greece); Olympiacos Piraeus	(Hungary); Szolnok	(Italy); Pro Recco
2016–17; Details	(Hungary); Szolnok	10–5	(Croatia); Jug Dubrovnik	(Italy); Pro Recco	(Hungary); Eger
2017–18; Details	(Greece); Olympiacos Piraeus	9–7	(Italy); Pro Recco	(Spain); Atlètic-Barceloneta	(Croatia); Jug Dubrovnik
2018–19; Details	(Hungary); Ferencváros	10–10 (PSO: 4–3)	(Greece); Olympiacos Piraeus	(Italy); Pro Recco	(Spain); Atlètic-Barceloneta
2019–20; Details	Cancelled due to the COVID-19 pandemic in Europe				
2020–21; Details	(Italy); Pro Recco	9–6	(Hungary); Ferencváros	(Italy); AN Brescia	(Spain); Atlètic-Barceloneta
2021–22; Details	(Italy); Pro Recco	13–13 (PSO: 4–3)	(Serbia); Novi Beograd	(Hungary); Ferencváros	(Italy); AN Brescia
2022–23; Details	(Italy); Pro Recco	14–11	(Serbia); Novi Beograd	(Spain); Atlètic-Barceloneta	(Greece); NC Vouliagmeni
2023–24; Details	(Hungary); Ferencváros	12–11	(Italy); Pro Recco	(Greece); Olympiacos Piraeus	(Serbia); Novi Beograd
2024–25; Details	(Hungary); Ferencváros	13–11	(Serbia); Novi Beograd	(Spain); Atlètic-Barceloneta	(France); CN Marseille
2025–26; Details	(Spain); Atlètic-Barceloneta	17–16	(Italy); Pro Recco	(Hungary); Ferencváros	(Greece); Olympiacos Piraeus

== Titles by club ==
Rank	Club	Titles	Runner-up	Champion years
1.	(Italy) Pro Recco	11	9	1964–65, 1983–84, 2002–03, 2006–07, 2007–08, 2009–10, 2011–12, 2014–15, 2020–21, 2021–22, 2022–23
2.	(Socialist Federal Republic of Yugoslavia) (Croatia) Mladost	7	4	1967–68, 1968–69, 1969–70, 1971–72, 1989–90, 1990–91, 1995–96
3.	(Socialist Federal Republic of Yugoslavia) (Serbia) Partizan	7	3	1963–64, 1965–66, 1966–67, 1970–71, 1974–75, 1975–76, 2010–11
4.	(Socialist Federal Republic of Yugoslavia) (Croatia) Jug Dubrovnik	4	4	1980–81, 2000–01, 2005–06, 2015–16
–	(West Germany) Spandau 04	4	4	1982–83, 1985–86, 1986–87, 1988–89
6.	(Hungary) Ferencváros	3	1	2018–19, 2023–24, 2024–25
7.	(Italy) Posillipo	3		1996–97, 1997–98, 2004–05
8.	(Greece) Olympiacos Piraeus	2	3	2001–02, 2017–18
9.	(Hungary) OSC Budapest	2	2	1972–73, 1978–79
10.	(Hungary) Vasas	2	1	1979–80, 1984–85
11.	(Croatia) Jadran Split	2		1991–92, 1992–93
–	(Spain) Atlètic-Barceloneta	2		2013–14, 2025–26
13.	(Hungary) Honvéd	1	3	2003–04
14.	(Soviet Union) CSK VMF Moscow	1	2	1976–77
–	(Hungary) Újpest	1	2	1993–94
–	(Spain) Catalunya	1	2	1994–95
17.	(Italy) Canottieri Napoli	1	1	1977–78
–	(Italy) Pescara	1	1	1987–88
–	(Serbia) Bečej	1	1	1999–00
–	(Montenegro) Primorac Kotor	1	1	2008–09
21.	(Soviet Union) MGU Moscow	1		1973–74
–	(Spain) Barcelona	1		1981–82
–	(Croatia) POŠK	1		1998–99
–	(Serbia) Crvena zvezda	1		2012–13
–	(Hungary) Szolnok	1		2016–17
26.	(Soviet Union) Dynamo Moscow		3
–	(Serbia) Novi Beograd		3
28.	(Croatia) Primorje		2
29.	(East Germany) Dynamo Magdeburg		1
–	(Romania) Dinamo București		1
–	(Netherlands) Zian		1
–	(Spain) Montjuïc		1
–	(Soviet Union) Dynamo Alma-Ata		1
–	(Netherlands) Alphen		1
–	(Hungary) BVSC		1
–	(Italy) Savona		1
–	(Montenegro) Jadran Herceg Novi		1
–	(Serbia) Radnički Kragujevac		1

== Titles by nation ==
Rank	Country	Titles	Runners-up	CL winning clubs
1.	Italy	16	12	4
2.	(Socialist Federal Republic of Yugoslavia) (Federal Republic of Yugoslavia) Yugoslavia ^{[A]}	14	6	4
3.	Hungary	10	10	6
4.	Croatia ^{[A]}	7	9	3
5.	Germany ^{[B]}	4	4	1
6.	Spain	4	3	3
7.	Soviet Union ^{[C]}	2	6	2
8.	Serbia ^{[A]}	2	4	2
9.	Greece	2	3	1
10.	Montenegro ^{[A]}	1	1	1
11.	Netherlands		2
12.	East Germany		1
	Romania		1

*^{A} Results until the breakup of Yugoslavia in 1991 and the self-determination of all countries unless the union of Serbia and Montenegro, named until 2003 as FR YUgoslavia, and broke up in 2006. Clubs from present day Serbia won the title 7 times and were runners-up additional 4 times, clubs from present day Croatia won the title 7 and were runners-up one time, clubs from present day Montenegro were runners-up one time.

*^{AB} and ^{AB} . Note, Croatian record counting since 1991, while Serbian and Montenegrin counting since 2006, only.

*^{B} The results of West Germany counted with those of Germany.

*^{C} Results until the dissolution of the Soviet Union in 1991. Clubs from present day Russia won the title 2 times and were runners-up additional 5 times, clubs from present day Kazakhstan were runners-up once time.

== Records ==
- Pro Recco has been the most successful club, having won the competition a record 11 times.
- Mladost (1968, 1969, 1970) and Pro Recco (2021, 2022, 2023) are the only two clubs to have won the competition three times in a row.
- Partizan and Pro Recco are the only two clubs to have won the European Championship twice in a row for two times (1966, 1967 & 1975, 1976) and (2007, 2008 & 2021, 2022)
- Spandau 04 (1986, 1987), Mladost (1990, 1991), Jadran Split (1992, 1993) and Posillipo (1997, 1998) are the other five teams to have won the European Championship twice in a row, only for one time.
- Most finals in a row: 7 Pro Recco (2006-2012), 5 Mladost (1968-1972) & Spandau 04 (1986-1990).

=== Most Titles ===
==== Players ====
bold - active players

Player	Titles	Clubs	
Player	Titles	#	List
(Australia) / (Italy) Pietro Figlioli	7	1	Pro Recco (2007, 2010, 2012, 2015, 2021, 2022, 2023)
(Socialist Federal Republic of Yugoslavia) Đorđe Perišić	6	1	Partizan (1964, 1966, 1967, 1971, 1975, 1976)
(Italy) Maurizio Felugo	6	2	Posillipo (2005), Pro Recco (2007, 2008, 2010, 2012, 2015)
(Socialist Federal Republic of Yugoslavia) Ozren Bonačić	5	2	Partizan (1964), Mladost (1968, 1969, 1970, 1972)
(Socialist Federal Republic of Yugoslavia) Mirko Sandić	5	1	Partizan (1964, 1966, 1967, 1971, 1975)
(Socialist Federal Republic of Yugoslavia) Božidar Novaković	5	1	Partizan (1966, 1967, 1971, 1975, 1976)
(Hungary) Tibor Benedek	5	2	Ujpest (1994), Pro Recco (2003, 2008, 2010, 2012)
(Hungary) Tamás Kásás	5	2	Posillipo (1998), Pro Recco (2007, 2008, 2010, 2012)
(Italy) Stefano Tempesti	5	1	Pro Recco (2007, 2008, 2010, 2012, 2015)
(Serbia) **Andrija Prlainović**	5	4	Partizan (2011), Pro Recco (2012, 2015), Crvena Zvezda (2013), Szolnok (2017)
(Hungary) Norbert Madaras	5	2	Pro Recco (2007, 2008, 2010, 2012), Ferencvaros (2019)
(Montenegro) **Aleksandar Ivović**	5	1	Pro Recco (2012, 2015, 2021, 2022, 2023)
(Australia) **Aaron Younger**	5	3	Szolnok (2017), Ferencvaros (2019), Pro Recco (2021, 2022, 2023)
(Serbia) **Duško Pijetlović**	4	3	Partizan (2011), Pro Recco (2012, 2015), Crvena Zvezda (2013)
(Socialist Federal Republic of Yugoslavia) Branimir Glidžić	4	1	Partizan (1964, 1966, 1967, 1971)
(Socialist Federal Republic of Yugoslavia) Zoran Janković	4	1	Partizan (1964, 1966, 1967, 1971)
(Socialist Federal Republic of Yugoslavia) Feliče Tedeski	4	1	Partizan (1964, 1966, 1967, 1971)
(Socialist Federal Republic of Yugoslavia) Zdravko Hebel	4	1	Mladost (1968, 1969, 1970, 1972)
(Socialist Federal Republic of Yugoslavia) Milan Jeger	4	1	Mladost (1968, 1969, 1970, 1972)
(Socialist Federal Republic of Yugoslavia) Miroslav Poljak	4	1	Mladost (1968, 1969, 1970, 1972)
(Socialist Federal Republic of Yugoslavia) Karlo Stipanić	4	1	Mladost (1968, 1969, 1970, 1972)
(Socialist Federal Republic of Yugoslavia) Zlatko Šimenc	4	1	Mladost (1968, 1969, 1970, 1972)
(Socialist Federal Republic of Yugoslavia) Marijan Žužej	4	1	Mladost (1968, 1969, 1970, 1972)
(Mexico) / (Germany) Armando Fernández	4	1	Spandau04 (1982, 1985, 1986, 1989)
(Germany) Peter Röhle	4	1	Spandau04 (1982, 1985, 1986, 1989)
(Germany) Hagen Stamm	4	1	Spandau04 (1982, 1985, 1986, 1989)
(Argentina) / (Italy) **Gonzalo Echenique**	4	2	Barceloneta (2014), Pro Recco (2021, 2022, 2023)
(Italy) **Matteo Aicardi**	4	1	Pro Recco (2015, 2021, 2022, 2023)
(Italy) **Francesco Di Fulvio**	4	1	Pro Recco (2015, 2021, 2022, 2023)
(Serbia) **Dušan Mandić**	4	3	Partizan (2011), Pro Recco (2021), Ferencvaros (2024, 2025)
(Serbia) Vladimir Vujasinović	4	2	Partizan (2011), Pro Recco (2003, 2007, 2008)

(Brazil) / (Spain) Felipe Perrone rounds up the list of players who won titles with at least 3 different clubs.

==== Coaches ====
Coach	Titles	Clubs	
Coach	Titles	#	List
(Socialist Federal Republic of Yugoslavia) Vlaho Orlić	6	1	Partizan (1964, 1966, 1967, 1971, 1975, 1976)
(Italy) Giuseppe Porzio	5	2	Posillipo (2005), Pro Recco (2007, 2008, 2010, 2012)
(Socialist Federal Republic of Yugoslavia) Aleksandar Coša Seifert	4	1	Mladost (1968, 1969, 1970, 1972)
(Socialist Federal Republic of Yugoslavia) Alfred Balen	3	1	Spandau04 (1982, 1985, 1986)

==== As Player and Coach combined ====
Player/Coach	Titles	as Player		as Coach	
Player/Coach	Titles	#	List	#	List
(Italy) Giuseppe Porzio	7	2	Posillipo (1997, 1998)	5	Posillipo (2005), Pro Recco (2007, 2008, 2010, 2012)
(Socialist Federal Republic of Yugoslavia) / (Croatia) Ozren Bonačić	6	5	Partizan (1964), Mladost (1968, 1969, 1970, 1972)	1	Mladost (1996)
(Socialist Federal Republic of Yugoslavia) Duško Antunović	5	3	Partizan (1971, 1975, 1976)	2	Mladost (1990, 1991)
(Serbia) Igor Milanović	5	3	Mladost (1990, 1991), Catalunya (1995)	2	Partizan (2011), Pro Recco (2015)
(Socialist Federal Republic of Yugoslavia) Ivo Trumbić	4	3	Mladost (1967, 1968, 1969)	1	Pescara (1988)
(Italy) Paolo De Crescenzo	3	1	Canottieri Naples (1978)	2	Posilllipo (1997, 1998)
(Croatia) Sandro Sukno	3	1	Pro Recco (2012)	2	Pro Recco (2022, 2023)

* Two players were players and coaches at the same time in the winning teams. Boris Čukvas won three titles in a dual role. He was a player and Partizan's coach during the seasons in which the Belgrade-based club won its first three titles (1963/64, 1965/66 and 1966/67). Eraldo Pizzo was a player and Pro Recco's coach in the season 1964/65.

Titles (2) as a player and a coach: Veselin Đuho, Marco Baldineti, Vjekoslav Kobeščak.

== Awards ==
=== Most valuable player Final Tournament ===
- 2010 – (Serbia) Vanja Udovičić
- 2011 – (Hungary) Tamás Kásás
- 2012 – (Hungary) Dénes Varga
- 2013 – (Serbia) Andrija Prlainovic
- 2014 – (Spain) Albert Español
- 2015 – (Spain) Felipe Perrone
- 2016 – (Spain) Felipe Perrone
- 2017 – (Serbia) Andrija Prlainovic
- 2018 – (Croatia) Josip Pavic
- 2019 – (Hungary) Dénes Varga
- 2020 Not awarded due to COVID-19 pandemic
- 2021 – (Serbia) Dušan Mandić
- 2022 – (Italy) Giacomo Cannella
- 2023 – (Hungary) Gergő Zalánki
- 2024 – (Serbia) Dušan Mandić

=== Top Scorer by Season ===
- 2012–13 – (Spain) Felipe Perrone 31 goals
- 2013–14 – (Serbia) Filip Filipović 51 goals
- 2014–15 – (Croatia) Sandro Sukno 34 goals
- 2015–16 – (Hungary) Dénes Varga 33 goals
- 2016–17 – (Spain) Felipe Perrone 42 goals
- 2017–18 – (Montenegro) Darko Brguljan 42 goals
- 2018–19 – (Greece) Kostas Genidounias 42 goals
- 2019–20 Not awarded due to COVID-19 pandemic
- 2020–21 – (Greece) Angelos Vlachopoulos 41 goals
- 2021–22 – (Hungary) Gergő Zalánki 42 goals
- 2022–23 – (Spain) Alvaro Granados 46 goals
- 2023–24 – (Spain) Alvaro Granados 39 goals

== See also ==
=== Men ===
- European Aquatics Euro Cup
- European Aquatics Conference Cup
- European Aquatics Challenger Cup
- European Aquatics Super Cup

=== Women ===
- European Aquatics Women's Champions League
- European Aquatics Women's Euro Cup
- European Aquatics Women's Conference Cup
- European Aquatics Women's Challenger Cup
- European Aquatics Women's Super Cup

=== Defunct ===
- LEN Cup Winners' Cup
