= SV Würzburg 05 =

Schwimmverein Würzburg 05 (swimming club Würzburg 05), shortly Würzburg 05, is a German water sports club.

== History ==
The club founded in 1905, is one of the largest swimming clubs in Germany and one of the largest in Europe. The SVW 05 built in 1968, the first club's indoor swimming pool (25m pool) in Germany. In 1972, the construction of an additional own 50m indoor sports pool, which has been extended in the following years, among other things, a gym and a sauna area.

In addition to its core sports there are the departments triathlon, synchronized swimming, running club and fitness.

== Water polo ==
The "zero five" have since its foundation in 1905, spawned a variety of Olympic athletes in swimming and water polo. The association is a total of five times German water polo champions (DWL) (1970, 1974, 1976, 1977 & 1978). In European competitions SVW 05 has reached 3 consecutive times in the European Champions cup semifinals in 1976-77, 1977–78 and 1978-79.

== The Legend ==
Club's figurehead is Thomas Lurz, ten-time world champion in open water swimming and bronze medalist of the 2008 Olympic Games in Beijing over ten kilometers.
