= SG Dynamo Magdeburg =

SG Dynamo Magdeburg (Sportgemeinschaft Dynamo Magdeburg) was an East German water polo club.

== History ==
After the Second World War and after led by the Soviet occupation authorities banned all sports clubs emerged in Magdeburg numerous provisionally organized sports communities. From 1948, the Sport mode in the Soviet occupation zone by establishing company sports teams (BSG) has been reorganized.

Since the mid-50s until the late 70s Dynamo Magdeburg emerged as one of the one powers in water polo in East Germany, a real powerhouse, since at that time Dynamo won 18 national championships and seven national cups. Beyond the ten consecutive championships from 1957 to 1966 the team proved to be extremely competitive at the European Champions cup, reaching five times in the 60s, to the semi-finals while in 1966, lost the European title by the Yugoslavian champion club of Partizan. In 1987, Dynamo won the East German cup, its last title until the Deutsche Wiedervereinigung, the reunification of the two Germanies.

== Titles & achievements ==
=== Domestic competitions ===
East German league

- Winners (18): 1957, 1958, 1959, 1960, 1961, 1962, 1963, 1964, 1965, 1966, 1968, 1970, 1971, 1972, 1973, 1976, 1977, 1978

East German cup

- Winners (8): 1960, 1962, 1964, 1973, 1974, 1975, 1977, 1987

=== European competitions ===
European Champions cup

- Runner-up (1): 1965-66
- 3rd place (4): 1963-64, 1964-65, 1966-67, 1968-69
