= SG Waspo'98 Hannover =

Club information
- Full name: SG Waspo'98 Hannover
- City: Hannover
- Founded: 1898

Water Polo
- Name: SG Waspo'98 Hannover
- Founded: 2003
- League: Deutsche Wasserball-Liga

The Waspo 98 Hannover is a swimming and professional water polo club in Hannover, Germany. The club was founded in 2003 by the fusion of the former German champions Waspo Hannover-Linden 1913 and Wasserfreunde 98 Hannover.

== Bibliography ==
Wolfgang Philipps: Vergangenheit und Zukunft. 100 Jahre Waspo Hannover-Linden. 1913 – 2013, Hannover 2013
