= Wasserfreunde Spandau 04 =

German water polo and swimming club

Club information
- Full name: Wasserfreunde Spandau 04
- City: Berlin
- Founded: 1904

Water Polo
- Name: Wasserfreunde Spandau 04
- Founded: 1922
- Head coach: Hagen Stamm; Athanasios Kechagias
- League: Deutsche Wasserball-Liga
- 2021/22: 2nd

The Wasserfreunde Spandau 04 is a swimming club in Spandau, Berlin, Germany.

The club is known for the professional water polo team, which has won a record number of German championships with 39, as well as German Cups (33) and Super Cups (17). In European tournaments the team has won 4 LEN Champions Leagues and 2 LEN Super Cup titles. The club has over 3,500 members.

The word Wasserfreunde is German for "Water Friends".

== Arena ==
The team plays its home games in the Sportzentrum Schöneberg. For 2027, the team plans to move to the then newly constructed arena in Spandau.

== Honours ==
=== European competitions ===
- LEN Champions League

Winners (4): 1982–83, 1985–86, 1986–87, 1988–89
Runners–up (4): 1980–81, 1981–82, 1987–88, 1989–90

- LEN Super Cup

Winners (2): 1986, 1987
Runners–up (1): 1983

=== Domestic competitions ===
- German League

Winners (39): 1979, 1980, 1981, 1982, 1983, 1984, 1985, 1986, 1987, 1988, 1989, 1990, 1991, 1992, 1994, 1995, 1996, 1997, 1998, 1999, 2000, 2001, 2002, 2003, 2004, 2005, 2007, 2008, 2009, 2010, 2011, 2012, 2014, 2015, 2016, 2017, 2019, 2023, 2024

- German Cup

Winners (33): 1979, 1980, 1981, 1982, 1983, 1984, 1985, 1986, 1987, 1990, 1991, 1992, 1994, 1995, 1996, 1997, 1999, 2000, 2001, 2002, 2004, 2005, 2006, 2007, 2008, 2009, 2011, 2012, 2014, 2015, 2016, 2020, 2024

- German Supercup

Winners (17): 1979, 1980, 1981, 1982, 1983, 1984, 1985, 1997, 1999, 2001, 2002, 2003, 2014, 2015, 2016, 2021, 2022

== Notable former members ==
Yusra Mardini, trained with Wasserfreunde Spandau 04 after moving to Berlin from Syria; she went on to represent the Refugee Olympic Team at Rio 2016 and Tokyo 2020.
