= 2024–25 European Aquatics Champions League qualification round =

Tournament information
- Sport: Water polo
- Dates: 12–15 September 2024
- Teams: 18
- Website: Official website

The 2024–25 European Aquatics Champions League qualification round is played between 12 and 15 September 2024 to determine the four teams advancing to the Main round of the 2024–25 European Aquatics Champions League.

== Format ==
The 18 teams were place into four groups, two with four teams and 2 with five teams. In each group, teams will play against each other once in a round-robin format. The group winners in each group advanced to the Main round.

Teams are ranked according to points (3 points for a win, 2 points for a penalty shootout win, 1 point for a penalty shootout loss, 0 points for a loss), and if tied on points, the following tiebreaking criteria are applied, in the order given, to determine the rankings:

- Points in head-to-head matches among tied teams;
- Goal difference in head-to-head matches among tied teams;
- Goals scored in head-to-head matches among tied teams;
- Goal difference in all group matches;
- Goals scored in all group matches.

== Draw ==
The draw took place in Zagreb on 13 August 2024. The seeding was based on the men's club rankings. The only restriction was that clubs from the same country could not be drawn against each other. H indicates which clubs is hosting a group. Teams in bold advanced to the Main round.

Key to colours
Group winners advance to **Main round**

Pot 1
Team	Ranking	Points
(Italy) AN Brescia	6	26,682.5
(Croatia) Jug AO Dubrovnik **(H)**	7	23,975
(Greece) NC Vouliagmeni	9	19,802.5
(Spain) Astrapool Sabadell **(H)**	10	18,740

Pot 2
Team	Ranking	Points
(Germany) Spandau 04	13	14,742.5
(Italy) CC Ortigia	19	12,112.5
(Spain) CN Barcelona	21	11,112.5
(Serbia) Radnički Kragujevac **(H)**	22	10,565

Pot 3
Team	Ranking	Points
(Serbia) VK Šabac	26	7,925
(Montenegro) Jadran Herceg Novi	27	7,832.5
(Romania) CSM Oradea **(H)**	30	6,812.5
(Croatia) HAVK Mladost Zagreb	33	6,120
(Hungary) BVSC-Zugló	34	5,990

Pot 4
Team	Ranking	Points
(Turkey) Enka Istanbul	40	3,375
(France) Pays d'Aix Natation	47	2,475
(Bosnia and Herzegovina) VK Banja Luka	68	930
(Romania) Dinamo București	90	110
(Greece) AC PAOK	N/A	0

== Groups ==
=== Group A ===
12–15 September 2024, Dubrovnik, Croatia

Pos	Team	Pld	W	PSW	PSL	L	GF	GA	GD	Pts	Qualification	(Montenegro) JAD	(Croatia) JUG	(Spain) BAR	(Romania) DIN	(Bosnia and Herzegovina) BAN
1	(Montenegro) Jadran Herceg Novi	4	4	0	0	0	78	33	+45	12	Main round	—	—	14–10	15–8	35–3
2	(Croatia) Jug AO Dubrovnik (H)	4	3	0	0	1	65	32	+33	9		12–14	—	14–9	15–8	24–1
3	(Spain) CN Barcelona	4	2	0	0	2	70	44	+26	6		—	—	—	18–12	33–4
4	(Romania) Dinamo București	4	1	0	0	3	58	55	+3	3		—	—	—	—	—
5	(Bosnia and Herzegovina) VK Banja Luka	4	0	0	0	4	15	122	−107	0		—	—	—	7–30	—

Source: European Aquatics
(H) Host

12 September; 18:30	Report	Jug AO Dubrovnik (Croatia)	15–8	(Romania) Dinamo București	Bazen u Gružu, Dubrovnik; Referees: Nikolaos Boudramis (GRE), Sebastien Dervieux (FRA)
12 September; 18:30	Report	Score by quarters: 3–3, 6–0, 3–1, 3–4			Bazen u Gružu, Dubrovnik; Referees: Nikolaos Boudramis (GRE), Sebastien Dervieux (FRA)
12 September; 18:30	Report	Kržić, Joković 3	Goals	Cubranic 3	Bazen u Gružu, Dubrovnik; Referees: Nikolaos Boudramis (GRE), Sebastien Dervieux (FRA)

12 September; 20:30	Report	Jadran Herceg Novi (Montenegro)	35–3	(Bosnia and Herzegovina) VK Banja Luka	Bazen u Gružu, Dubrovnik; Referees: Tamas Kovacs-Csatlos (HUN), Rik Evers (NED)
12 September; 20:30	Report	Score by quarters: 10–0, 7–1, 9–2, 9–0			Bazen u Gružu, Dubrovnik; Referees: Tamas Kovacs-Csatlos (HUN), Rik Evers (NED)
12 September; 20:30	Report	Gojkovic, Obradovic 7	Goals	three players 1	Bazen u Gružu, Dubrovnik; Referees: Tamas Kovacs-Csatlos (HUN), Rik Evers (NED)

13 September; 18:30	Report	Jug AO Dubrovnik (Croatia)	12–14	(Montenegro) Jadran Herceg Novi	Bazen u Gružu, Dubrovnik; Referees: Sebastien Dervieux (FRA), Tamas Kovacs-Csatlos (HUN)
13 September; 18:30	Report	Score by quarters: 5–3, 1–5, 3–4, 3–2			Bazen u Gružu, Dubrovnik; Referees: Sebastien Dervieux (FRA), Tamas Kovacs-Csatlos (HUN)
13 September; 18:30	Report	Burić 3	Goals	Kohlod 4	Bazen u Gružu, Dubrovnik; Referees: Sebastien Dervieux (FRA), Tamas Kovacs-Csatlos (HUN)

13 September; 20:30	Report	CN Barcelona (Spain)	18–12	(Romania) Dinamo București	Bazen u Gružu, Dubrovnik; Referees: Nikolaos Boudramis (GRE), Rik Evers (NED)
13 September; 20:30	Report	Score by quarters: 5–5, 3–3, 5–2, 5–2			Bazen u Gružu, Dubrovnik; Referees: Nikolaos Boudramis (GRE), Rik Evers (NED)
13 September; 20:30	Report	Gorria Puga 4	Goals	Prioteasa, Vranceanu 3	Bazen u Gružu, Dubrovnik; Referees: Nikolaos Boudramis (GRE), Rik Evers (NED)

14 September; 10:30	Report	CN Barcelona (Spain)	33–4	(Bosnia and Herzegovina) VK Banja Luka	Bazen u Gružu, Dubrovnik; Referees: Rik Evers (NED), Sebastien Dervieux (FRA)
14 September; 10:30	Report	Score by quarters: 10–2, 8–1, 9–1, 6–0			Bazen u Gružu, Dubrovnik; Referees: Rik Evers (NED), Sebastien Dervieux (FRA)
14 September; 10:30	Report	Angelescu 6	Goals	Kojcinovic 2	Bazen u Gružu, Dubrovnik; Referees: Rik Evers (NED), Sebastien Dervieux (FRA)

14 September; 12:30	Report	Jadran Herceg Novi (Montenegro)	15–8	(Romania) Dinamo București	Bazen u Gružu, Dubrovnik; Referees: Nikolaos Boudramis (GRE), Paul Kovac (AUT)
14 September; 12:30	Report	Score by quarters: 5–2, 2–1, 5–2, 3–3			Bazen u Gružu, Dubrovnik; Referees: Nikolaos Boudramis (GRE), Paul Kovac (AUT)
14 September; 12:30	Report	Kohlod 4	Goals	Čubranić 3	Bazen u Gružu, Dubrovnik; Referees: Nikolaos Boudramis (GRE), Paul Kovac (AUT)

14 September; 18:30	Report	Jug AO Dubrovnik (Croatia)	14–9	(Spain) CN Barcelona	Bazen u Gružu, Dubrovnik; Referees: Tamas Kovacs-Csatlos (HUN), Rik Evers (NED)
14 September; 18:30	Report	Score by quarters: 2–1, 5–4, 6–2, 1–2			Bazen u Gružu, Dubrovnik; Referees: Tamas Kovacs-Csatlos (HUN), Rik Evers (NED)
14 September; 18:30	Report	Burić 3	Goals	Daura Gomez 4	Bazen u Gružu, Dubrovnik; Referees: Tamas Kovacs-Csatlos (HUN), Rik Evers (NED)

14 September; 20:30	Report	VK Banja Luka (Bosnia and Herzegovina)	7–30	(Romania) Dinamo București	Bazen u Gružu, Dubrovnik; Referees: Sebastien Dervieux (FRA), Nikolaos Boudramis (GRE)
14 September; 20:30	Report	Score by quarters: 0–8, 3–8, 2–7, 2–7			Bazen u Gružu, Dubrovnik; Referees: Sebastien Dervieux (FRA), Nikolaos Boudramis (GRE)
14 September; 20:30	Report	Vujković 5	Goals	Kovats, Lutescu 5	Bazen u Gružu, Dubrovnik; Referees: Sebastien Dervieux (FRA), Nikolaos Boudramis (GRE)

15 September; 10:30	Report	Jadran Herceg Novi (Montenegro)	14–10	(Spain) CN Barcelona	Bazen u Gružu, Dubrovnik; Referees: Sebastien Dervieux (FRA), Rik Evers (NED)
15 September; 10:30	Report	Score by quarters: 4–3, 4–3, 5–1, 1–3			Bazen u Gružu, Dubrovnik; Referees: Sebastien Dervieux (FRA), Rik Evers (NED)
15 September; 10:30	Report	three players 3	Goals	Ramon Sesen, Te Riele 3	Bazen u Gružu, Dubrovnik; Referees: Sebastien Dervieux (FRA), Rik Evers (NED)

15 September; 12:30	Report	Jug AO Dubrovnik (Croatia)	24–1	(Bosnia and Herzegovina) VK Banja Luka	Bazen u Gružu, Dubrovnik; Referees: Nikolaos Boudramis (GRE), Tamas Kovacs-Csatlos (HUN)
15 September; 12:30	Report	Score by quarters: 8–0, 6–1, 5–0, 5–0			Bazen u Gružu, Dubrovnik; Referees: Nikolaos Boudramis (GRE), Tamas Kovacs-Csatlos (HUN)
15 September; 12:30	Report	Brajovic 5	Goals	Stevandic 1	Bazen u Gružu, Dubrovnik; Referees: Nikolaos Boudramis (GRE), Tamas Kovacs-Csatlos (HUN)

=== Group B ===
13–15 September 2024, Kragujevac, Serbia

Pos	Team	Pld	W	PSW	PSL	L	GF	GA	GD	Pts	Qualification	(Serbia) RAD	(Hungary) ZUG	(Croatia) MLA	(Greece) VOU
1	(Serbia) Radnički Kragujevac (H)	3	3	0	0	0	33	30	+3	9	Main round	—	10–9	9–8	14–13
2	(Hungary) BVSC-Zugló	3	2	0	0	1	40	32	+8	6		—	—	—	17–9
3	(Croatia) HAVK Mladost Zagreb	3	1	0	0	2	32	29	+3	3		—	13–14	—	—
4	(Greece) NC Vouliagmeni	3	0	0	0	3	28	42	−14	0		—	—	6–11	—

Source: European Aquatics
(H) Host

13 September; 18:00	Report	NC Vouliagmeni (Greece)	6–11	(Croatia) HAVK Mladost Zagreb	Sports Center Park, Kragujevac; Referees: Gernot Haentschel (GER), Julien Bourges (FRA)
13 September; 18:00	Report	Score by quarters: 1–2, 1–4, 3–2, 1–3			Sports Center Park, Kragujevac; Referees: Gernot Haentschel (GER), Julien Bourges (FRA)
13 September; 18:00	Report	Kalogeropoulos 3	Goals	Kharkov 5	Sports Center Park, Kragujevac; Referees: Gernot Haentschel (GER), Julien Bourges (FRA)

13 September; 20:00	Report	Radnički Kragujevac (Serbia)	10–9	(Hungary) BVSC-Zugló	Sports Center Park, Kragujevac; Referees: Alessandro Severo (ITA), David Gomez (ESP)
13 September; 20:00	Report	Score by quarters: 2–1, 2–3, 2–5, 4–0			Sports Center Park, Kragujevac; Referees: Alessandro Severo (ITA), David Gomez (ESP)
13 September; 20:00	Report	Murišić, Pijetlović 2	Goals	three players 2	Sports Center Park, Kragujevac; Referees: Alessandro Severo (ITA), David Gomez (ESP)

14 September; 18:00	Report	HAVK Mladost Zagreb (Croatia)	13–14	(Hungary) BVSC-Zugló	Sports Center Park, Kragujevac; Referees: Julien Bourges (FRA), Alessandro Severo (ITA)
14 September; 18:00	Report	Score by quarters: 6–5, 2–2, 2–5, 3–2			Sports Center Park, Kragujevac; Referees: Julien Bourges (FRA), Alessandro Severo (ITA)
14 September; 18:00	Report	Kharkov, Lazić 3	Goals	Zsombor 8	Sports Center Park, Kragujevac; Referees: Julien Bourges (FRA), Alessandro Severo (ITA)

14 September; 20:00	Report	Radnički Kragujevac (Serbia)	14–13	(Greece) NC Vouliagmeni	Sports Center Park, Kragujevac; Referees: Gernot Haentschel (GER), David Gomez (ESP)
14 September; 20:00	Report	Score by quarters: 4–4, 4–1, 3–4, 3–4			Sports Center Park, Kragujevac; Referees: Gernot Haentschel (GER), David Gomez (ESP)
14 September; 20:00	Report	Rašović 4	Goals	Kalogeropoulos 6	Sports Center Park, Kragujevac; Referees: Gernot Haentschel (GER), David Gomez (ESP)

15 September; 18:00	Report	BVSC-Zugló (Hungary)	17–9	(Greece) NC Vouliagmeni	Sports Center Park, Kragujevac; Referees: Gernot Haentschel (GER), Alessandro Severo (ITA)
15 September; 18:00	Report	Score by quarters: 3–1, 4–3, 4–1, 6–3			Sports Center Park, Kragujevac; Referees: Gernot Haentschel (GER), Alessandro Severo (ITA)
15 September; 18:00	Report	Kovács 6	Goals	Almyras 4	Sports Center Park, Kragujevac; Referees: Gernot Haentschel (GER), Alessandro Severo (ITA)

15 September; 20:00	Report	Radnički Kragujevac (Serbia)	9–8	(Croatia) HAVK Mladost Zagreb	Sports Center Park, Kragujevac; Referees: David Gomez (ESP), Julien Bourges (FRA)
15 September; 20:00	Report	Score by quarters: 0–2, 1–3, 4–3, 4–0			Sports Center Park, Kragujevac; Referees: David Gomez (ESP), Julien Bourges (FRA)
15 September; 20:00	Report	Jakšić 4	Goals	Lazić, Vukičević 2	Sports Center Park, Kragujevac; Referees: David Gomez (ESP), Julien Bourges (FRA)

=== Group C ===
12–15 September 2024, Oradea, Romania

Pos	Team	Pld	W	PSW	PSL	L	GF	GA	GD	Pts	Qualification	(Romania) ORA	(Germany) SPA	(Italy) BRE	(Greece) PAOK	(Turkey) ENK
1	(Romania) CSM Oradea (H)	4	3	1	0	0	53	36	+17	11	Main round	—	8–7	14–13 (Note: Match ended 7–7, CSM Oradea won 7–6 on penalties.)	—	—
2	(Germany) Spandau 04	4	3	0	0	1	43	36	+7	9		—	—	—	12–10	15–11
3	(Italy) AN Brescia	4	2	0	1	1	51	36	+15	7		—	7–9	—	15–4	—
4	(Greece) AC PAOK	4	1	0	0	3	33	48	−15	3		8–11	—	—	—	11–10
5	(Turkey) Enka Istanbul	4	0	0	0	4	38	62	−24	0		8–20	—	9–16	—	—

Source: European Aquatics
(H) Host

12 September; 18:30	Report	Enka Istanbul (Turkey)	8–20	(Romania) CSM Oradea	Bazinul Olimpic Ioan Alexandrescu, Oradea; Referees: Ivan Rakovic (SRB), Gyorgy Kun (HUN)
12 September; 18:30	Report	Score by quarters: 1–2, 3–8, 3–4, 1–6			Bazinul Olimpic Ioan Alexandrescu, Oradea; Referees: Ivan Rakovic (SRB), Gyorgy Kun (HUN)
12 September; 18:30	Report	Dervisis 3	Goals	Belenyesi 5	Bazinul Olimpic Ioan Alexandrescu, Oradea; Referees: Ivan Rakovic (SRB), Gyorgy Kun (HUN)

12 September; 20:30	Report	Spandau 04 (Germany)	12–10	(Greece) AC PAOK	Bazinul Olimpic Ioan Alexandrescu, Oradea; Referees: Andrej Franulovic (CRO), Pau Segurana (ESP)
12 September; 20:30	Report	Score by quarters: 2–3, 3–2, 4–2, 3–3			Bazinul Olimpic Ioan Alexandrescu, Oradea; Referees: Andrej Franulovic (CRO), Pau Segurana (ESP)
12 September; 20:30	Report	Tkac, Vukojevic 4	Goals	Delic 4	Bazinul Olimpic Ioan Alexandrescu, Oradea; Referees: Andrej Franulovic (CRO), Pau Segurana (ESP)

13 September; 18:30	Report	CSM Oradea (Romania)	8–7	(Germany) Spandau 04	Bazinul Olimpic Ioan Alexandrescu, Oradea; Referees: Andrej Franulovic (CRO), Ivan Rakovic (SRB)
13 September; 18:30	Report	Score by quarters: 3–4, 1–1, 3–1, 1–1			Bazinul Olimpic Ioan Alexandrescu, Oradea; Referees: Andrej Franulovic (CRO), Ivan Rakovic (SRB)
13 September; 18:30	Report	three players 2	Goals	Vukojević 2	Bazinul Olimpic Ioan Alexandrescu, Oradea; Referees: Andrej Franulovic (CRO), Ivan Rakovic (SRB)

13 September; 20:30	Report	AN Brescia (Italy)	15–4	(Greece) AC PAOK	Bazinul Olimpic Ioan Alexandrescu, Oradea; Referees: Pau Segurana (ESP), Gyorgy Kun (HUN)
13 September; 20:30	Report	Score by quarters: 4–1, 3–0, 4–2, 4–1			Bazinul Olimpic Ioan Alexandrescu, Oradea; Referees: Pau Segurana (ESP), Gyorgy Kun (HUN)
13 September; 20:30	Report	Ferrero 3	Goals	Delić 2	Bazinul Olimpic Ioan Alexandrescu, Oradea; Referees: Pau Segurana (ESP), Gyorgy Kun (HUN)

14 September; 09:30	Report	AC PAOK (Greece)	11–10	(Turkey) Enka Istanbul	Bazinul Olimpic Ioan Alexandrescu, Oradea; Referees: Pau Segurana (ESP), Ivan Rakovic (SRB)
14 September; 09:30	Report	Score by quarters: 1–2, 1–1, 4–4, 5–3			Bazinul Olimpic Ioan Alexandrescu, Oradea; Referees: Pau Segurana (ESP), Ivan Rakovic (SRB)
14 September; 09:30	Report	Bitsakos 4	Goals	Dervisis, Kuloğlu 3	Bazinul Olimpic Ioan Alexandrescu, Oradea; Referees: Pau Segurana (ESP), Ivan Rakovic (SRB)

14 September; 11:30	Report	AN Brescia (Italy)	7–9	(Germany) Spandau 04	Bazinul Olimpic Ioan Alexandrescu, Oradea; Referees: Gyorgy Kun (HUN), Andrej Franulovic (CRO)
14 September; 11:30	Report	Score by quarters: 3–2, 0–3, 1–1, 3–3			Bazinul Olimpic Ioan Alexandrescu, Oradea; Referees: Gyorgy Kun (HUN), Andrej Franulovic (CRO)
14 September; 11:30	Report	Del Basso, Irving 2	Goals	Caraj 3	Bazinul Olimpic Ioan Alexandrescu, Oradea; Referees: Gyorgy Kun (HUN), Andrej Franulovic (CRO)

14 September; 18:30	Report	AC PAOK (Greece)	8–11	(Romania) CSM Oradea	Bazinul Olimpic Ioan Alexandrescu, Oradea; Referees: Andrej Franulovic (CRO), Gyorgy Kun (HUN)
14 September; 18:30	Report	Score by quarters: 1–2, 1–5, 3–2, 3–2			Bazinul Olimpic Ioan Alexandrescu, Oradea; Referees: Andrej Franulovic (CRO), Gyorgy Kun (HUN)
14 September; 18:30	Report	Bitsakos 3	Goals	Gardašević 5	Bazinul Olimpic Ioan Alexandrescu, Oradea; Referees: Andrej Franulovic (CRO), Gyorgy Kun (HUN)

14 September; 20:30	Report	Enka Istanbul (Turkey)	9–16	(Italy) AN Brescia	Bazinul Olimpic Ioan Alexandrescu, Oradea; Referees: Pau Segurana (ESP), Ivan Rakovic (SRB)
14 September; 20:30	Report	Score by quarters: 1–3, 3–4, 2–7, 3–2			Bazinul Olimpic Ioan Alexandrescu, Oradea; Referees: Pau Segurana (ESP), Ivan Rakovic (SRB)
14 September; 20:30	Report	Dervisis 3	Goals	Alesiani, Balzarini 4	Bazinul Olimpic Ioan Alexandrescu, Oradea; Referees: Pau Segurana (ESP), Ivan Rakovic (SRB)

15 September; 10:00	Report	Spandau 04 (Germany)	15–11	(Turkey) Enka Istanbul	Bazinul Olimpic Ioan Alexandrescu, Oradea; Referees: Gyorgy Kun (HUN), Pau Segurana (ESP)
15 September; 10:00	Report	Score by quarters: 2–4, 6–2, 5–3, 2–2			Bazinul Olimpic Ioan Alexandrescu, Oradea; Referees: Gyorgy Kun (HUN), Pau Segurana (ESP)
15 September; 10:00	Report	Culina 3	Goals	Dervisis 3	Bazinul Olimpic Ioan Alexandrescu, Oradea; Referees: Gyorgy Kun (HUN), Pau Segurana (ESP)

15 September; 12:00	Report	CSM Oradea (Romania)	14–13	(Italy) AN Brescia	Bazinul Olimpic Ioan Alexandrescu, Oradea; Referees: Ivan Rakovic (SRB), Andrej Franulovic (CRO)
15 September; 12:00	Report	Score by quarters: 2–2, 2–2, 2–2, 1–1 PSO: 7–6			Bazinul Olimpic Ioan Alexandrescu, Oradea; Referees: Ivan Rakovic (SRB), Andrej Franulovic (CRO)
15 September; 12:00	Report	Gardašević 5	Goals	Faraglia 3	Bazinul Olimpic Ioan Alexandrescu, Oradea; Referees: Ivan Rakovic (SRB), Andrej Franulovic (CRO)

=== Group D ===
13–15 September 2024, Sabadell, Spain

Pos	Team	Pld	W	PSW	PSL	L	GF	GA	GD	Pts	Qualification	(Spain) AST	(Serbia) SAB	(Italy) ORT	(France) PAY
1	(Spain) Astrapool Sabadell (H)	3	3	0	0	0	48	25	+23	9	Main round	—	14–9	17–11	17–5
2	(Serbia) VK Šabac	3	2	0	0	1	39	35	+4	6		—	—	14–13	—
3	(Italy) CC Ortigia	3	1	0	0	2	39	43	−4	3		—	—	—	15–12
4	(France) Pays d'Aix Natation	3	0	0	0	3	25	48	−23	0		—	8–16	—	—

Source: European Aquatics
(H) Host

13 September; 19:00	Report	Astrapool Sabadell (Spain)	17–5	(France) Pays d'Aix Natation	Can Llong pool, Sabadell; Referees: Nenad Peris (CRO), Sinisa Matijasevic (MNE)
13 September; 19:00	Report	Score by quarters: 5–0, 5–0, 4–0, 3–5			Can Llong pool, Sabadell; Referees: Nenad Peris (CRO), Sinisa Matijasevic (MNE)
13 September; 19:00	Report	four players 3	Goals	Watanabe 3	Can Llong pool, Sabadell; Referees: Nenad Peris (CRO), Sinisa Matijasevic (MNE)

13 September; 21:00	Report	VK Šabac (Serbia)	14–13	(Italy) CC Ortigia	Can Llong pool, Sabadell; Referees: Hendrik Schopp (GER), Konstantinos Vasileiou (GRE)
13 September; 21:00	Report	Score by quarters: 4–2, 6–4, 2–2, 2–5			Can Llong pool, Sabadell; Referees: Hendrik Schopp (GER), Konstantinos Vasileiou (GRE)
13 September; 21:00	Report	Barac 4	Goals	Cassia 4	Can Llong pool, Sabadell; Referees: Hendrik Schopp (GER), Konstantinos Vasileiou (GRE)

14 September; 17:30	Report	Astrapool Sabadell (Spain)	14–9	(Serbia) VK Šabac	Can Llong pool, Sabadell; Referees: Hendrik Schopp (GER), Nenad Peris (CRO)
14 September; 17:30	Report	Score by quarters: 4–3, 3–3, 5–1, 2–2			Can Llong pool, Sabadell; Referees: Hendrik Schopp (GER), Nenad Peris (CRO)
14 September; 17:30	Report	Bowen 5	Goals	Korac 2	Can Llong pool, Sabadell; Referees: Hendrik Schopp (GER), Nenad Peris (CRO)

14 September; 19:15	Report	CC Ortigia (Italy)	15–12	(France) Pays d'Aix Natation	Can Llong pool, Sabadell; Referees: Sinisa Matijasevic (MNE), Konstantinos Vasileiou (GRE)
14 September; 19:15	Report	Score by quarters: 5–5, 3–3, 2–2, 5–2			Can Llong pool, Sabadell; Referees: Sinisa Matijasevic (MNE), Konstantinos Vasileiou (GRE)
14 September; 19:15	Report	Napolitano 4	Goals	Watanabe 4	Can Llong pool, Sabadell; Referees: Sinisa Matijasevic (MNE), Konstantinos Vasileiou (GRE)

15 September; 11:30	Report	Pays d'Aix Natation (France)	8–16	(Serbia) VK Šabac	Can Llong pool, Sabadell; Referees: Konstantinos Vasileiou (GRE), Hendrik Schopp (GER)
15 September; 11:30	Report	Score by quarters: 3–4, 2–5, 2–4, 2–3			Can Llong pool, Sabadell; Referees: Konstantinos Vasileiou (GRE), Hendrik Schopp (GER)
15 September; 11:30	Report	Drahe 4	Goals	Dragovic, Toholj 3	Can Llong pool, Sabadell; Referees: Konstantinos Vasileiou (GRE), Hendrik Schopp (GER)

15 September; 13:15	Report	Astrapool Sabadell (Spain)	17–11	(Italy) CC Ortigia	Can Llong pool, Sabadell; Referees: Nenad Peris (CRO), Sinisa Matijasevic (MNE)
15 September; 13:15	Report	Score by quarters: 4–3, 5–3, 2–1, 6–4			Can Llong pool, Sabadell; Referees: Nenad Peris (CRO), Sinisa Matijasevic (MNE)
15 September; 13:15	Report	Bowen 5	Goals	Inaba 5	Can Llong pool, Sabadell; Referees: Nenad Peris (CRO), Sinisa Matijasevic (MNE)

== See also ==
- 2024–25 European Aquatics Champions League
- 2024–25 European Aquatics Euro Cup
- 2024–25 European Aquatics Challenger Cup
- 2024 European Aquatics Super Cup
- 2024–25 European Aquatics Women's Champions League
- 2024–25 European Aquatics Women's Euro Cup
- 2024–25 European Aquatics Women's Challenger Cup
- 2024 European Aquatics Women's Super Cup
