= 2024–25 European Aquatics Champions League Final Four =

Men's water polo competition

Tournament details
- Host country: Malta
- Venue: 1 (in 1 host city)
- Dates: 30 May – 1 June
- Teams: 4

Final positions
- Champions: (Hungary) FTC-Telekom (3rd title)
- Runners-up: (Serbia) Novi Beograd
- Third place: (Spain) Zodiac Atlètic-Barceloneta
- Fourth place: (France) CN Marseille

Tournament statistics
- Matches played: 4
- Goals scored: 96 (24 per match)
- Top scorer: (Spain) Alvaro Granados (11 goals)

Awards
- Best player: (Hungary) Krisztián Manhercz

The 2024–25 European Aquatics Champions League Final Four will be the season-ending event to decide the champions of the 2024–25 European Aquatics Champions League. The Final Four tournament will be held at the National Pool Complex in Valletta, Malta.

FTC-Telekom won their third title with a win over Novi Beograd in the final.

== Host selection ==
Starting with the 2023–24 season, a Final Four tournament was played instead of a Final Eight. On 14 January 2024, Maltese media reported that the Aquatic Sports Association of Malta were in advanced talks with LEN over organizing the Final Four. On 18 January 2024, LEN announced that Valletta would host all Final Four tournaments over the next three seasons.

== Teams ==
Teams qualified by finishing first and second in the 2024–25 European Aquatics Champions League Quarter-finals round.

=== Group A ===
Pos	Team	Pld	W	PSW	PSL	L	GF	GA	GD	Pts	Qualification	(Serbia) NOV	(France) MAR	(Greece) OLY	(Croatia) JAD
1	(Serbia) Novi Beograd	6	5	0	0	1	80	63	+17	**15**	Final Four	—	15–14	16–15	17–8
2	(France) CN Marseille	6	4	0	0	2	77	58	+19	**12**	Final Four	14–9	—	12–7	11–9
3	(Greece) Olympiacos Piraeus	6	2	0	1	3	64	69	−5	**7**		5–8	12–8	—	13–14 (Note: Match ended 9–9, Jadran Split won 7–6 on penalties.)
4	(Croatia) Jadran Split	6	0	1	0	5	55	86	−31	**2**		7–15	6–18	11–12	—

Source: European Aquatics

=== Group B ===
Pos	Team	Pld	W	PSW	PSL	L	GF	GA	GD	Pts	Qualification	(Hungary) FTC	(Spain) BAR	(Italy) SAV	(Romania) ORA
1	(Hungary) FTC-Telekom	6	5	0	1	0	100	60	+40	**16**	Final Four	—	18–10	15–11	20–10
2	(Spain) Zodiac Atlètic-Barceloneta	6	4	1	0	1	85	62	+23	**14**	Final Four	13–12 (Note: Match ended 9–9, Zodiac Atlètic-Barceloneta won 4–3 on penalties.)	—	17–10	17–4
3	(Italy) RN Savona	6	2	0	0	4	71	83	−12	**6**		9–17	10–14	—	14–9
4	(Romania) CSM Oradea	6	0	0	0	6	49	100	−51	**0**		7–18	8–14	11–17	—

Source: European Aquatics

==== Qualified teams ====
Team	Qualified date	Participations (Note: Including Final Six and Eights tournaments.) (bold indicates winners)
(Hungary) FTC-Telekom	22 April 2025	5 (**2018–19**, 2020–21, 2021–22, 2022–23, **2023–24**)
(Spain) Zodiac Atlètic-Barceloneta	22 April 2025	10 (2012–13, **2013–14**, 2014–15, 2015–16, 2017–18, 2018–19, 2020–21, 2021–22, 2022–23)
(France) CN Marseille	23 April 2025	None
(Serbia) Novi Beograd	23 April 2025	3 (2021–22, 2022–23, 2023–24)

== Venue ==
The venue for this competition will be the National Pool Complex in Valletta, Malta. The capacity is 3,000.

== Referees ==
Six referees were selected to officiate at the Final Four tournament.

Referees
Croatia	Andrej Franulović
Germany	Frank Ohme
Greece	Georgios Stavridis
Italy	Raffaele Colombo
Netherlands	Michiel Zwart
Slovenia	Boris Margeta

== Bracket ==
Semi-finals
30 May
(Serbia) Novi Beograd (PSO)	15
(Spain) Zodiac Atlètic-Barceloneta	14
30 May
(Hungary) FTC-Telekom	14
(France) CN Marseille	11

Final
1 June
(Serbia) Novi Beograd	11
(Hungary) FTC-Telekom	13
Third place
1 June
(Spain) Zodiac Atlètic-Barceloneta	19
(France) CN Marseille	9

=== Semi-finals ===
30 May 2025; 19:30	Report	Novi Beograd (Serbia)	15–14 (PSO)	(Spain) Zodiac Atlètic-Barceloneta	National Pool Complex, Valletta; Referees: Boris Margeta (SLO), Frank Ohme (GER)
30 May 2025; 19:30	Report	Score by quarters: 3–3, 2–1, 1–3, 4–3 PSO: 5–4			National Pool Complex, Valletta; Referees: Boris Margeta (SLO), Frank Ohme (GER)
30 May 2025; 19:30	Report	three players 2	Goals	Granados 5	National Pool Complex, Valletta; Referees: Boris Margeta (SLO), Frank Ohme (GER)

30 May 2025; 21:30	Report	FTC-Telekom (Hungary)	14–11	(France) CN Marseille	National Pool Complex, Valletta; Referees: Andrej Franulović (CRO), Michiel Zwart (NED)
30 May 2025; 21:30	Report	Score by quarters: 5–2, 3–2, 2–4, 4–3			National Pool Complex, Valletta; Referees: Andrej Franulović (CRO), Michiel Zwart (NED)
30 May 2025; 21:30	Report	four players 2	Goals	three players 3	National Pool Complex, Valletta; Referees: Andrej Franulović (CRO), Michiel Zwart (NED)

=== Third place match ===
1 June 2025; 19:30	Report	Zodiac Atlètic-Barceloneta (Spain)	19–9	(France) CN Marseille	National Pool Complex, Valletta; Referees: Michiel Zwart (NED), Frank Ohme (GER)
1 June 2025; 19:30	Report	Score by quarters: 6–2, 4–1, 6–4, 3–2			National Pool Complex, Valletta; Referees: Michiel Zwart (NED), Frank Ohme (GER)
1 June 2025; 19:30	Report	Granados 6	Goals	Vernoux 3	National Pool Complex, Valletta; Referees: Michiel Zwart (NED), Frank Ohme (GER)

=== Final ===
1 June 2025; 21:30	Report	Novi Beograd (Serbia)	11–13	(Hungary) FTC-Telekom	National Pool Complex, Valletta; Referees: Georgios Stavridis (GRE), Raffaele Colombo (ITA)
1 June 2025; 21:30	Report	Score by quarters: 3–3, 2–2, 3–5, 3–3			National Pool Complex, Valletta; Referees: Georgios Stavridis (GRE), Raffaele Colombo (ITA)
1 June 2025; 21:30	Report	Lukic 6	Goals	Manhercz 6	National Pool Complex, Valletta; Referees: Georgios Stavridis (GRE), Raffaele Colombo (ITA)

2024–25 European Aquatics Champions League Champions

FTC-Telekom
3rd title

== See also ==
- 2024–25 European Aquatics Euro Cup
- 2024–25 European Aquatics Challenger Cup
- 2024 European Aquatics Super Cup
- 2024–25 European Aquatics Women's Champions League
- 2024–25 European Aquatics Women's Euro Cup
- 2024–25 European Aquatics Women's Challenger Cup
- 2024 European Aquatics Women's Super Cup
