= 2024–25 European Aquatics Champions League =

Water polo sports season

European Aquatics Champions League
- 2024–25

Tournament information
- Sport: Water polo
- Dates: Qualification round: 12–15 September 2024; Main Round: 8 October – 4 December 2024; Quarter-finals round: 4 February – 14 May 2025; Final Four: 30 May 2025–1 June 2025
- Teams: Competition proper: 16; Total: 30 (from 13 countries)
- Website: Official website

Final positions
- Champions: (Hungary) FTC-Telekom (3rd title)
- Runner-up: (Serbia) Novi Beograd

Tournament statistics
- Matches played: 108
- Goals scored: 2,619 (24.25 per match)

The 2024–25 European Aquatics Champions League is the 62nd edition of the newly renamed European Aquatics's premier competition for men's water polo clubs. FTC-Telekom are the defending champions.

FTC-Telekom won their third title with a win over Novi Beograd in the final.

== Format ==
After one qualification round, sixteen teams will qualify for the group stage. Four groups of four will be played., with the top two in each group will make the quarter-finals round (also a group stage). The team that finish third and fourth will compete in the 2024–25 European Aquatics Euro Cup knockout stage. The remaining eight teams in the quarter-finals round will play a further six matches, with the top two in each group making the Final Four.

== Rankings ==
The top 11 best ranked countries in the new rankings are allowed to have their national champion go directly into the main round, as long as they meet requirements.

Rank	Association	Points	Teams
1	Italy	110,260	3
2	Hungary	84,492.5	3
3	Spain	71,732.5	3
4	Serbia	69,815	3
5	Greece	68,857.5	3
6	Croatia	57,210	3
7	France	45,620	2
8	Germany	33,042.5	2
9	Romania	17,087.5	3
10	Montenegro	14,977.5	2
11	(Georgia (country)) Georgia	12,407.5	1
12	Turkey	7,245	1
13	Russia	5,162.5	0
14	Switzerland	3,685	0
15	Netherlands	3,280	0

Rank	Association	Points	Teams
16	Slovakia	3,180	0
17	Portugal	2,972.5	0
18	Slovenia	2,960	0
19	Lithuania	1,877.5	0
20	Bosnia and Herzegovina	1,790	1
21	(United Kingdom) Great Britain	1,720	0
22	Belgium	1,310	0
23	Malta	1,310	0
24	Israel	860	0
25	Denmark	560	0
26	Finland	560	0
27	Bulgaria	370	0
28	Cyprus	370	0
29	Poland	317.5	0

== Teams ==
Alongside the 11 domestic champions, the defending champions also get a spot in the main round. In the event that the Champions League defending champions won their national league, the runners-up of the national league will take the vacant spot. In this season, as FTC-Telekom are the reigning champions, Hungary's spot was given to the Hungarian runners-up, A-Híd Vasas Plaket. After the abrupt withdrawal of the Italian champions, Pro Recco, due to financial reasons, RN Savona, who placed second, takes their place in the Main round. Also, despite finishing fourth, CC Ortigia took Italy's third spot in the tournament. Croatia also saw a team withdrawing with Primorje EB Rijeka, who placed third, giving up their spot. The replacement was HAVK Mladost Zagreb, who finished fourth.

Main round
(Croatia) Jadran Split (1st)	(France) CN Marseille (1st)	(Georgia (country)) Dinamo Tbilisi (1st)	(Germany) Waspo'98 Hannover (1st)
(Greece) Olympiacos Piraeus (1st)	(Hungary) FTC-Telekom ^{CL} (1st)	(Hungary) A-Híd Vasas Plaket (2nd)	(Italy) RN Savona (2nd)
(Montenegro) Primorac Kotor (1st)	(Romania) Steaua București (1st)	(Serbia) Novi Beograd (1st)	(Spain) Zodiac Atlètic-Barceloneta (1st)

Qualification round
(Bosnia and Herzegovina) VK Banja Luka (1st)	(Croatia) Jug AO Dubrovnik (2nd)	(Croatia) HAVK Mladost Zagreb (4th)	(France) Pays d'Aix Natation (3rd)
(Germany) Spandau 04 (2nd)	(Greece) NC Vouliagmeni (2nd)	(Greece) AC PAOK (3rd)	(Hungary) BVSC-Zugló (3rd)
(Italy) AN Brescia (3rd)	(Italy) CC Ortigia (4th)	(Montenegro) Jadran Herceg Novi (2nd)	(Romania) CSM Oradea (2nd)
(Romania) Dinamo București (3rd)	(Serbia) Radnički Kragujevac (2nd)	(Serbia) VK Šabac (3rd)	(Spain) Astrapool Sabadell (2nd)
(Spain) CN Barcelona (3rd)	(Turkey) Enka Istanbul (1st)		

== Round and draw dates ==
=== Schedule ===
Phase	Round	Round date
Qualification round		12–15 September 2024
Main round	Matchday 1	8–9 October 2024
Main round	Matchday 2	15–16 October 2024
Main round	Matchday 3	29–30 October 2024
Main round	Matchday 4	12–13 November 2024
Main round	Matchday 5	19–20 November 2024
Main round	Matchday 6	3–4 December 2024
Quarter-finals round	Matchday 1	4–5 February 2025
Quarter-finals round	Matchday 2	25–26 February 2025
Quarter-finals round	Matchday 3	18–19 March 2025
Quarter-finals round	Matchday 4	1–2 April 2025
Quarter-finals round	Matchday 5	22–23 April 2025
Quarter-finals round	Matchday 6	13–14 May 2025
Final Four	Semifinals	30 May 2025
Final Four	Final	1 June 2025

== Qualification round ==
The group winners qualify for the main round, while everyone else drops down to the Euro Cup qualifiers.

=== Draw ===
The draw was on 13 August 2024 in Zagreb, Croatia. H indicates which clubs is hosting a group. Teams in bold advanced to the main round.

Pot 1	Pot 2	Pot 3	Pot 4
(Italy) AN Brescia (Croatia) Jug AO Dubrovnik **(H)** (Greece) NC Vouliagmeni (Spain) **Astrapool Sabadell** **(H)**	(Germany) Spandau 04 (Italy) CC Ortigia (Spain) CN Barcelona (Serbia) **Radnički Kragujevac** **(H)**	(Serbia) VK Šabac (Montenegro) **Jadran Herceg Novi** (Romania) **CSM Oradea** **(H)** (Croatia) HAVK Mladost Zagreb (Hungary) BVSC-Zugló	(Turkey) Enka Istanbul (France) Pays d'Aix Natation (Bosnia and Herzegovina) VK Banja Luka (Romania) Dinamo București (Greece) AC PAOK

=== Group A ===
12–15 September 2024, Dubrovnik, Croatia

Pos	Team	Pld	W	PSW	PSL	L	GF	GA	GD	Pts	Qualification	(Montenegro) JAD	(Croatia) JUG	(Spain) BAR	(Romania) DIN	(Bosnia and Herzegovina) BAN
1	(Montenegro) Jadran Herceg Novi	4	4	0	0	0	78	33	+45	**12**	Main round	—	—	14–10	15–8	35–3
2	(Croatia) Jug AO Dubrovnik (H)	4	3	0	0	1	65	32	+33	**9**		12–14	—	14–9	15–8	24–1
3	(Spain) CN Barcelona	4	2	0	0	2	70	44	+26	**6**		—	—	—	18–12	33–4
4	(Romania) Dinamo București	4	1	0	0	3	58	55	+3	**3**		—	—	—	—	—
5	(Bosnia and Herzegovina) VK Banja Luka	4	0	0	0	4	15	122	−107	**0**		—	—	—	7–30	—

Source: European Aquatics
(H) Host

=== Group B ===
13–15 September 2024, Kragujevac, Serbia

Pos	Team	Pld	W	PSW	PSL	L	GF	GA	GD	Pts	Qualification	(Serbia) RAD	(Hungary) ZUG	(Croatia) MLA	(Greece) VOU
1	(Serbia) Radnički Kragujevac (H)	3	3	0	0	0	33	30	+3	**9**	Main round	—	10–9	9–8	14–13
2	(Hungary) BVSC-Zugló	3	2	0	0	1	40	32	+8	**6**		—	—	—	17–9
3	(Croatia) HAVK Mladost Zagreb	3	1	0	0	2	32	29	+3	**3**		—	13–14	—	—
4	(Greece) NC Vouliagmeni	3	0	0	0	3	28	42	−14	**0**		—	—	6–11	—

Source: European Aquatics
(H) Host

=== Group C ===
12–15 September 2024, Oradea, Romania

Pos	Team	Pld	W	PSW	PSL	L	GF	GA	GD	Pts	Qualification	(Romania) ORA	(Germany) SPA	(Italy) BRE	(Greece) PAOK	(Turkey) ENK
1	(Romania) CSM Oradea (H)	4	3	1	0	0	53	36	+17	**11**	Main round	—	8–7	14–13 (Note: Match ended 7–7, CSM Oradea won 7–6 on penalties.)	—	—
2	(Germany) Spandau 04	4	3	0	0	1	43	36	+7	**9**		—	—	—	12–10	15–11
3	(Italy) AN Brescia	4	2	0	1	1	51	36	+15	**7**		—	7–9	—	15–4	—
4	(Greece) AC PAOK	4	1	0	0	3	33	48	−15	**3**		8–11	—	—	—	11–10
5	(Turkey) Enka Istanbul	4	0	0	0	4	38	62	−24	**0**		8–20	—	9–16	—	—

Source: European Aquatics
(H) Host

=== Group D ===
13–15 September 2024, Sabadell, Spain

Pos	Team	Pld	W	PSW	PSL	L	GF	GA	GD	Pts	Qualification	(Spain) AST	(Serbia) SAB	(Italy) ORT	(France) PAY
1	(Spain) Astrapool Sabadell (H)	3	3	0	0	0	48	25	+23	**9**	Main round	—	14–9	17–11	17–5
2	(Serbia) VK Šabac	3	2	0	0	1	39	35	+4	**6**		—	—	14–13	—
3	(Italy) CC Ortigia	3	1	0	0	2	39	43	−4	**3**		—	—	—	15–12
4	(France) Pays d'Aix Natation	3	0	0	0	3	25	48	−23	**0**		—	8–16	—	—

Source: European Aquatics
(H) Host

== Main round ==
Location of teams of the 2024–25 European Aquatics Champions League group stage.
Red: Group A; Blue: Group B; Yellow: Group C; Green: Group D

The top two from each group make the quarter-finals round. The bottom two from each group drops down to the Euro Cup eighth-finals.

Teams are ranked according to points (3 points for a win, 2 points for a penalty shootout win, 1 point for a penalty shootout loss, 0 points for a loss), and if tied on points, the following tiebreaking criteria are applied, in the order given, to determine the rankings:

- Points in head-to-head matches among tied teams;
- Goal difference in head-to-head matches among tied teams;
- Goals scored in head-to-head matches among tied teams;
- Goal difference in all group matches;
- Goals scored in all group matches.

This season, 11 of the 16 clubs from last season are present. RN Savona return to the Champions League for the first time in 18 years. For the first time since 2010–11, Primorac Kotor will participate. After 13 years away, A-Híd Vasas Plaket qualified. Waspo'98 Hannover comes back after a one season absence. Of the teams who progressed from qualification, Radnički Kragujevac and CSM Oradea return after being absent for three and eleven years respectively.

For the first time ever, Romania will be represented by two clubs in the group stage, while Montenegro will boast two clubs in the group stage for the first time since 2011–12. Overall, a total of 11 countries are present in the group stage.

=== Group A ===
Pos	Team	Pld	W	PSW	PSL	L	GF	GA	GD	Pts	Qualification	(Serbia) NOV	(Romania) ORA	(Romania) STE	(Germany) HAN
1	(Serbia) Novi Beograd	6	6	0	0	0	75	51	+24	18	Advance to Quarter-finals	—	12–10	11–7	10–8
2	(Romania) CSM Oradea	6	2	2	0	2	79	83	−4	10	Advance to Quarter-finals	9–15	—	19–18 (Note: Match ended 11–11, CSM Oradea won 8–7 on penalties)	10–9
3	(Romania) Steaua București	6	1	1	2	2	77	86	−9	7	Transfer to Euro Cup	8–15	19–20 (Note: Match ended 13–13, CSM Oradea won 7–6 on penalties)	—	13–12 (Note: Match ended 8–8, Steaua București won 5–4 on penalties)
4	(Germany) Waspo'98 Hannover	6	0	0	1	5	57	68	−11	1	Transfer to Euro Cup	9–12	10–11	9–12	—

Source: European Aquatics

=== Group B ===
Pos	Team	Pld	W	PSW	PSL	L	GF	GA	GD	Pts	Qualification	(Hungary) FTC	(Croatia) JAD	(Serbia) RAD	(Georgia (country)) DIN
1	(Hungary) FTC-Telekom	6	6	0	0	0	92	42	+50	18	Advance to Quarter-finals	—	18–9	16–4	16–7
2	(Croatia) Jadran Split	6	3	1	0	2	76	69	+7	11	Advance to Quarter-finals	10–12	—	15–13 (Note: Match ended 10–10, Jadran Split won 5–3 on penalties)	12–5
3	(Serbia) Radnički Kragujevac	6	2	0	1	3	51	72	−21	7	Transfer to Euro Cup	5–12	11–14	—	8–6
4	(Georgia (country)) Dinamo Tbilisi	6	0	0	0	6	44	80	−36	0	Transfer to Euro Cup	7–18	10–16	9–10	—

Source: European Aquatics

=== Group C ===
Pos	Team	Pld	W	PSW	PSL	L	GF	GA	GD	Pts	Qualification	(Spain) BAR	(France) MAR	(Montenegro) JAD	(Hungary) VAS
1	(Spain) Zodiac Atlètic-Barceloneta	6	6	0	0	0	100	56	+44	18	Advance to Quarter-finals	—	19–14	18–7	18–7
2	(France) CN Marseille	6	3	0	0	3	69	67	+2	9	Advance to Quarter-finals	9–12	—	13–11	13–9
3	(Montenegro) Jadran Herceg Novi	6	2	0	0	4	61	73	−12	6	Transfer to Euro Cup	8–16	3–9	—	17–9
4	(Hungary) A-Híd Vasas Plaket	6	1	0	0	5	54	88	−34	3	Transfer to Euro Cup	10–15	13–11	6–14	—

Source: European Aquatics

=== Group D ===
Pos	Team	Pld	W	PSW	PSL	L	GF	GA	GD	Pts	Qualification	(Greece) OLY	(Italy) SAV	(Spain) AST	(Montenegro) KOT
1	(Greece) Olympiacos Piraeus	6	3	2	0	1	91	68	+23	13	Advance to Quarter-finals	—	9–10	15–11	20–19 (Note: Match ended 12–12, Olympiacos Piraeus won 8–7 on penalties)
2	(Italy) RN Savona	6	3	1	1	1	74	69	+5	12	Advance to Quarter-finals	11–14 (Note: Match ended 11–11, Olympiacos Piraeus won 3–0 on penalties)	—	10–12	11–9
3	(Spain) Astrapool Sabadell	6	1	1	1	3	75	84	−9	6	Transfer to Euro Cup	8–15	13–14 (Note: Match ended 11–11, RN Savona won 3–2 on penalties)	—	15–16
4	(Montenegro) Primorac Kotor	6	1	0	2	3	79	98	−19	5	Transfer to Euro Cup	9–18	12–18	14–16 (Note: Match ended 11–11, Astrapool Sabadell won 5–3 on penalties)	—

Source: European Aquatics

== Quarter-finals round ==
The four group winners and four group runners-up were drawn into two groups, with each one containing two group winners and two group runners-up. The top two teams in each group advanced to the Final Four.

=== Draw ===
The draw took place in Zagreb on 11 December. The seeded and unseeded clubs consist of the teams that finished first and second in the previous round respectively. The only restriction was that clubs from the same group in the Main round could not be drawn against each other.

Seeded	Unseeded
(Serbia) Novi Beograd (Hungary) FTC-Telekom (Spain) Zodiac Atlètic-Barceloneta (Greece) Olympiacos Piraeus	(Romania) CSM Oradea (Croatia) Jadran Split (France) CN Marseille (Italy) RN Savona

Teams are ranked according to points (3 points for a win, 2 points for a penalty shootout win, 1 point for a penalty shootout loss, 0 points for a loss), and if tied on points, the following tiebreaking criteria are applied, in the order given, to determine the rankings:

- Points in head-to-head matches among tied teams;
- Goal difference in head-to-head matches among tied teams;
- Goals scored in head-to-head matches among tied teams;
- Goal difference in all group matches;
- Goals scored in all group matches.

=== Group A ===
Pos	Team	Pld	W	PSW	PSL	L	GF	GA	GD	Pts	Qualification	(Serbia) NOV	(France) MAR	(Greece) OLY	(Croatia) JAD
1	(Serbia) Novi Beograd	6	5	0	0	1	80	63	+17	15	Final Four	—	15–14	16–15	17–8
2	(France) CN Marseille	6	4	0	0	2	77	58	+19	12	Final Four	14–9	—	12–7	11–9
3	(Greece) Olympiacos Piraeus	6	2	0	1	3	64	69	−5	7		5–8	12–8	—	13–14 (Note: Match ended 9–9, Jadran Split won 7–6 on penalties.)
4	(Croatia) Jadran Split	6	0	1	0	5	55	86	−31	2		7–15	6–18	11–12	—

Source: European Aquatics

=== Group B ===
Pos	Team	Pld	W	PSW	PSL	L	GF	GA	GD	Pts	Qualification	(Hungary) FTC	(Spain) BAR	(Italy) SAV	(Romania) ORA
1	(Hungary) FTC-Telekom	6	5	0	1	0	100	60	+40	16	Final Four	—	18–10	15–11	20–10
2	(Spain) Zodiac Atlètic-Barceloneta	6	4	1	0	1	85	62	+23	14	Final Four	13–12 (Note: Match ended 9–9, Zodiac Atlètic-Barceloneta won 4–3 on penalties.)	—	17–10	17–4
3	(Italy) RN Savona	6	2	0	0	4	71	83	−12	6		9–17	10–14	—	14–9
4	(Romania) CSM Oradea	6	0	0	0	6	49	100	−51	0		7–18	8–14	11–17	—

Source: European Aquatics

== Final Four ==
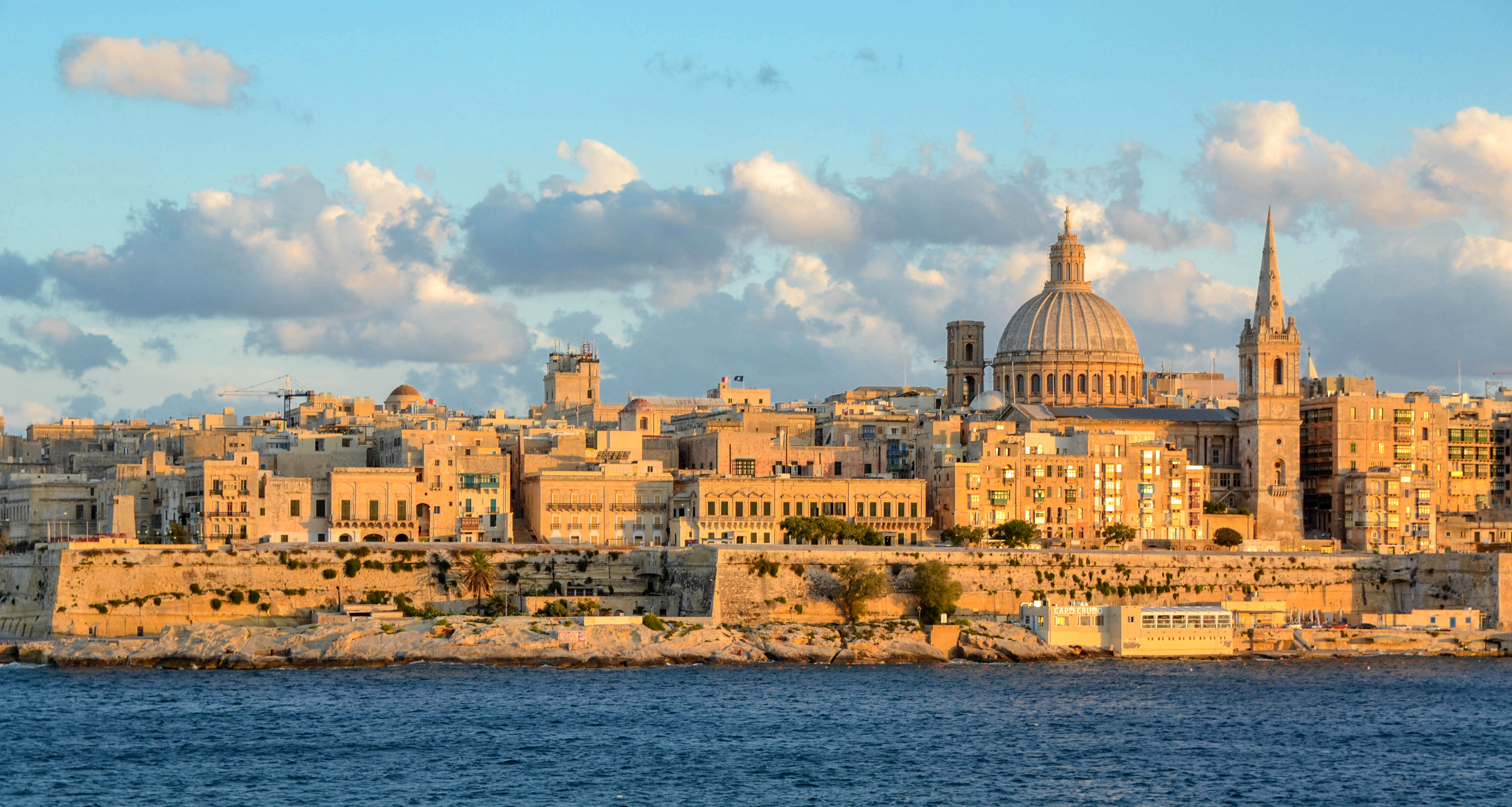
The National Pool Complex in Valletta will host the final four.

The Final Four tournament will be held from 31 May to 1 June 2025 at the National Pool Complex in Valletta, Malta.

=== Bracket ===
Semi-finals
30 May
(Serbia) Novi Beograd (PSO)	15
(Spain) Zodiac Atlètic-Barceloneta	14
30 May
(Hungary) FTC-Telekom	14
(France) CN Marseille	11

Final
1 June
(Serbia) Novi Beograd	11
(Hungary) FTC-Telekom	13
Third place
1 June
(Spain) Zodiac Atlètic-Barceloneta	19
(France) CN Marseille	9

=== Third place match ===
1 June 2025; 19:30	Report	Zodiac Atlètic-Barceloneta (Spain)	19–9	(France) CN Marseille	National Pool Complex, Valletta; Referees: Michiel Zwart (NED), Frank Ohme (GER)
1 June 2025; 19:30	Report	Score by quarters: 6–2, 4–1, 6–4, 3–2			National Pool Complex, Valletta; Referees: Michiel Zwart (NED), Frank Ohme (GER)
1 June 2025; 19:30	Report	Granados 6	Goals	Vernoux 3	National Pool Complex, Valletta; Referees: Michiel Zwart (NED), Frank Ohme (GER)

=== Final ===
1 June 2025; 21:30	Report	Novi Beograd (Serbia)	11–13	(Hungary) FTC-Telekom	National Pool Complex, Valletta; Referees: Georgios Stavridis (GRE), Raffaele Colombo (ITA)
1 June 2025; 21:30	Report	Score by quarters: 3–3, 2–2, 3–5, 3–3			National Pool Complex, Valletta; Referees: Georgios Stavridis (GRE), Raffaele Colombo (ITA)
1 June 2025; 21:30	Report	Lukic 6	Goals	Manhercz 6	National Pool Complex, Valletta; Referees: Georgios Stavridis (GRE), Raffaele Colombo (ITA)

2024–25 European Aquatics Champions League Champions

FTC-Telekom
3rd title

== See also ==
- 2024–25 European Aquatics Euro Cup
- 2024–25 European Aquatics Challenger Cup
- 2024 European Aquatics Super Cup
- 2024–25 European Aquatics Women's Champions League
- 2024–25 European Aquatics Women's Euro Cup
- 2024–25 European Aquatics Women's Challenger Cup
- 2024 European Aquatics Women's Super Cup
