= 2024–25 European Aquatics Champions League main round =

Tournament information
- Sport: Water polo
- Dates: 8 October–4 December 2024
- Teams: 16
- Website: Official website

The 2024–25 European Aquatics Champions League main round is played between 8 October and 4 December 2024 to determine the eight teams advancing to the Quarter-finals round of the 2024–25 European Aquatics Champions League.

== Format ==
The 16 teams were place into four groups of four. In each group, teams will play against each other home-and-away in a round-robin format. The top two teams in each group advanced to the Quarter-finals round.

Teams are ranked according to points (3 points for a win, 2 points for a penalty shootout win, 1 point for a penalty shootout loss, 0 points for a loss), and if tied on points, the following tiebreaking criteria are applied, in the order given, to determine the rankings:

- Points in head-to-head matches among tied teams;
- Goal difference in head-to-head matches among tied teams;
- Goals scored in head-to-head matches among tied teams;
- Goal difference in all group matches;
- Goals scored in all group matches.

== Draw ==
The draw took place in Zagreb on 13 August 2024. The seeding was based on the men's club rankings. The only restriction was that clubs from the same country could not be drawn against each other. The four teams from the qualifiers were not known at the time of the draw.

Key to colours
Group winners and runners-up advance to Quarter-finals round

Pot 1
Team	Ranking	Points
(Hungary) FTC-Telekom	2	36,680
(Serbia) Novi Beograd	3	32,800
(Spain) Zodiac Atlètic-Barceloneta	4	32,337.5
(Greece) Olympiacos Piraeus	5	29,202.5

Pot 2
Team	Ranking	Points
(France) CN Marseille	8	23,975
(Croatia) Jadran Split	11	17,237.5
(Italy) RN Savona	12	14,825
(Germany) Waspo'98 Hannover	15	13,195

Pot 3
Team	Ranking	Points
(Georgia (country)) Dinamo Tbilisi	17	12,407.5
(Hungary) A-Híd Vasas Plaket	18	12,345
(Romania) Steaua București	24	10,165
(Montenegro) Primorac Kotor	28	7,145

Pot 4
Team	Ranking	Points
(Montenegro) Jadran Herceg Novi (Note: Team not known at the time of the draw. Was the Group A winner in qualification.)	27	7,832.5
(Serbia) Radnički Kragujevac (Note: Team not known at the time of the draw. Was the Group B winner in qualification.)	22	10,565
(Romania) CSM Oradea (Note: Team not known at the time of the draw. Was the Group C winner in qualification.)	30	6,812.5
(Spain) Astrapool Sabadell (Note: Team not known at the time of the draw. Was the Group D winner in qualification.)	10	18,740

== Groups ==
=== Group A ===
Pos	Team	Pld	W	PSW	PSL	L	GF	GA	GD	Pts	Qualification	(Serbia) NOV	(Romania) ORA	(Romania) STE	(Germany) HAN
1	(Serbia) Novi Beograd	6	6	0	0	0	75	51	+24	18	Advance to Quarter-finals	—	12–10	11–7	10–8
2	(Romania) CSM Oradea	6	2	2	0	2	79	83	−4	10	Advance to Quarter-finals	9–15	—	19–18 (Note: Match ended 11–11, CSM Oradea won 8–7 on penalties)	10–9
3	(Romania) Steaua București	6	1	1	2	2	77	86	−9	7	Transfer to Euro Cup	8–15	19–20 (Note: Match ended 13–13, CSM Oradea won 7–6 on penalties)	—	13–12 (Note: Match ended 8–8, Steaua București won 5–4 on penalties)
4	(Germany) Waspo'98 Hannover	6	0	0	1	5	57	68	−11	1	Transfer to Euro Cup	9–12	10–11	9–12	—

Source: European Aquatics

8 October 2024; 18:15	Report	Novi Beograd (Serbia)	11–7	(Romania) Steaua București	11th April Sports and Recreation Center, Belgrade; Referees: Rik Evers (NED), Pau Segurana (ESP)
8 October 2024; 18:15	Report	Score by quarters: 3–3, 1–1, 2–2, 5–1			11th April Sports and Recreation Center, Belgrade; Referees: Rik Evers (NED), Pau Segurana (ESP)
8 October 2024; 18:15	Report	Skoumpakis 4	Goals	three players 2	11th April Sports and Recreation Center, Belgrade; Referees: Rik Evers (NED), Pau Segurana (ESP)

8 October 2024; 20:00	Report	Waspo'98 Hannover (Germany)	10–11	(Romania) CSM Oradea	Magdeburg Dynamo Schwimmhalle, Magdeburg; Referees: Xavier F. Buch (ESP), Veselin Miskovic (MNE)
8 October 2024; 20:00	Report	Score by quarters: 2–5, 1–2, 5–4, 2–0			Magdeburg Dynamo Schwimmhalle, Magdeburg; Referees: Xavier F. Buch (ESP), Veselin Miskovic (MNE)
8 October 2024; 20:00	Report	Buha 3	Goals	Gusarov 3	Magdeburg Dynamo Schwimmhalle, Magdeburg; Referees: Xavier F. Buch (ESP), Veselin Miskovic (MNE)

15 October 2024; 18:00	Report	Steaua București (Romania)	13–12	(Germany) Waspo'98 Hannover	Complexul Sportiv Steaua, Bucharest; Referees: David Gomez (ESP), Arnaldo Petronilli (ITA)
15 October 2024; 18:00	Report	Score by quarters: 4–0, 0–1, 1–3, 3–4 PSO: 5–4			Complexul Sportiv Steaua, Bucharest; Referees: David Gomez (ESP), Arnaldo Petronilli (ITA)
15 October 2024; 18:00	Report	Georgesku 3	Goals	Strelezkij 3	Complexul Sportiv Steaua, Bucharest; Referees: David Gomez (ESP), Arnaldo Petronilli (ITA)

15 October 2024; 18:00	Report	CSM Oradea (Romania)	9–15	(Serbia) Novi Beograd	Bazinul Olimpic Ioan Alexandrescu, Oradea; Referees: Tamas Kovacs-Csatlos (HUN), Stanko Ivanovski (MNE)
15 October 2024; 18:00	Report	Score by quarters: 2–3, 2–4, 3–5, 2–3			Bazinul Olimpic Ioan Alexandrescu, Oradea; Referees: Tamas Kovacs-Csatlos (HUN), Stanko Ivanovski (MNE)
15 October 2024; 18:00	Report	Gusarov 3	Goals	Martinović 4	Bazinul Olimpic Ioan Alexandrescu, Oradea; Referees: Tamas Kovacs-Csatlos (HUN), Stanko Ivanovski (MNE)

29 October 2024; 18:00	Report	Steaua București (Romania)	19–20	(Romania) CSM Oradea	Complexul Sportiv Steaua, Bucharest
29 October 2024; 18:00	Report	Score by quarters: 3–2, 1–4, 6–2, 3–5 PSO: 6–7			Complexul Sportiv Steaua, Bucharest
29 October 2024; 18:00	Report	Georgesku 3	Goals	Gardašević 6	Complexul Sportiv Steaua, Bucharest

29 October 2024; 18:00	Report	Novi Beograd (Serbia)	10–8	(Germany) Waspo'98 Hannover	11th April Sports and Recreation Center, Belgrade; Referees: Alessandro Severo (ITA), Norbert Ercse (HUN)
29 October 2024; 18:00	Report	Score by quarters: 5–2, 0–2, 1–0, 4–4			11th April Sports and Recreation Center, Belgrade; Referees: Alessandro Severo (ITA), Norbert Ercse (HUN)
29 October 2024; 18:00	Report	Vlachopoulos 3	Goals	Gansen, Sekulic 2	11th April Sports and Recreation Center, Belgrade; Referees: Alessandro Severo (ITA), Norbert Ercse (HUN)

13 November 2024; 19:15	Report	Steaua București (Romania)	8–15	(Serbia) Novi Beograd	Complexul Sportiv Steaua, Bucharest; Referees: Gyorgy Kun (HUN), Arnaldo Petronilli (ITA)
13 November 2024; 19:15	Report	Score by quarters: 2–5, 3–4, 2–3, 1–3			Complexul Sportiv Steaua, Bucharest; Referees: Gyorgy Kun (HUN), Arnaldo Petronilli (ITA)
13 November 2024; 19:15	Report	Fulea, Georgescu 3	Goals	Lukić, Martinović 3	Complexul Sportiv Steaua, Bucharest; Referees: Gyorgy Kun (HUN), Arnaldo Petronilli (ITA)

13 November 2024; 21:00	Report	CSM Oradea (Romania)	10–9	(Germany) Waspo'98 Hannover	Bazinul Olimpic Ioan Alexandrescu, Oradea; Referees: David Gomez (ESP), Božo Ðuraškovic (MNE)
13 November 2024; 21:00	Report	Score by quarters: 4–2, 0–2, 3–2, 3–3			Bazinul Olimpic Ioan Alexandrescu, Oradea; Referees: David Gomez (ESP), Božo Ðuraškovic (MNE)
13 November 2024; 21:00	Report	Gardašević, Vancsik 3	Goals	Lozina 3	Bazinul Olimpic Ioan Alexandrescu, Oradea; Referees: David Gomez (ESP), Božo Ðuraškovic (MNE)

20 November 2024; 18:15	Report	Novi Beograd (Serbia)	12–10	(Romania) CSM Oradea	11th April Sports and Recreation Center, Belgrade; Referees: Spyridon Achladiotis (GRE), Tomi Kavcic (SLO)
20 November 2024; 18:15	Report	Score by quarters: 4–2, 3–2, 4–5, 1–1			11th April Sports and Recreation Center, Belgrade; Referees: Spyridon Achladiotis (GRE), Tomi Kavcic (SLO)
20 November 2024; 18:15	Report	Martinovic 5	Goals	Gardasevic 4	11th April Sports and Recreation Center, Belgrade; Referees: Spyridon Achladiotis (GRE), Tomi Kavcic (SLO)

20 November 2024; 20:00	Report	Waspo'98 Hannover (Germany)	9–12	(Romania) Steaua București	Magdeburg Dynamo Schwimmhalle, Magdeburg; Referees: Nikolaos Boudramis (GRE), Norbert Ercse (HUN)
20 November 2024; 20:00	Report	Score by quarters: 2–3, 3–2, 2–5, 2–2			Magdeburg Dynamo Schwimmhalle, Magdeburg; Referees: Nikolaos Boudramis (GRE), Norbert Ercse (HUN)
20 November 2024; 20:00	Report	Buha 3	Goals	Fulea 3	Magdeburg Dynamo Schwimmhalle, Magdeburg; Referees: Nikolaos Boudramis (GRE), Norbert Ercse (HUN)

3 December 2024; 19:00	Report	CSM Oradea (Romania)	19–18	(Romania) Steaua București	Bazinul Olimpic Ioan Alexandrescu, Oradea; Referees: Jaume Teixido (ESP), Veselin Miskovic (MNE)
3 December 2024; 19:00	Report	Score by quarters: 2–3, 2–3, 3–1, 4–4 PSO: 8–7			Bazinul Olimpic Ioan Alexandrescu, Oradea; Referees: Jaume Teixido (ESP), Veselin Miskovic (MNE)
3 December 2024; 19:00	Report	Vancsik 4	Goals	Colodrovschi 3	Bazinul Olimpic Ioan Alexandrescu, Oradea; Referees: Jaume Teixido (ESP), Veselin Miskovic (MNE)

4 December 2024; 20:00	Report	Waspo'98 Hannover (Germany)	9–12	(Serbia) Novi Beograd	Magdeburg Dynamo Schwimmhalle, Magdeburg; Referees: Peter De Jong (NED), Levan Berishvili (GEO)
4 December 2024; 20:00	Report	Score by quarters: 2–3, 2–3, 1–4, 4–2			Magdeburg Dynamo Schwimmhalle, Magdeburg; Referees: Peter De Jong (NED), Levan Berishvili (GEO)
4 December 2024; 20:00	Report	Milardovic 4	Goals	Martinovic 3	Magdeburg Dynamo Schwimmhalle, Magdeburg; Referees: Peter De Jong (NED), Levan Berishvili (GEO)

=== Group B ===
Pos	Team	Pld	W	PSW	PSL	L	GF	GA	GD	Pts	Qualification	(Hungary) FTC	(Croatia) JAD	(Serbia) RAD	(Georgia (country)) DIN
1	(Hungary) FTC-Telekom	6	6	0	0	0	92	42	+50	18	Advance to Quarter-finals	—	18–9	16–4	16–7
2	(Croatia) Jadran Split	6	3	1	0	2	76	69	+7	11	Advance to Quarter-finals	10–12	—	15–13 (Note: Match ended 10–10, Jadran Split won 5–3 on penalties)	12–5
3	(Serbia) Radnički Kragujevac	6	2	0	1	3	51	72	−21	7	Transfer to Euro Cup	5–12	11–14	—	8–6
4	(Georgia (country)) Dinamo Tbilisi	6	0	0	0	6	44	80	−36	0	Transfer to Euro Cup	7–18	10–16	9–10	—

Source: European Aquatics

8 October 2024; 18:00	Report	FTC-Telekom (Hungary)	16–7	(Georgia (country)) Dinamo Tbilisi	Császár-Komjádi Béla Sport Swimming Pool, Budapest; Referees: Boris Margeta (SLO), Hendrik Schopp (GER)
8 October 2024; 18:00	Report	Score by quarters: 4–4, 5–1, 4–0, 3–2			Császár-Komjádi Béla Sport Swimming Pool, Budapest; Referees: Boris Margeta (SLO), Hendrik Schopp (GER)
8 October 2024; 18:00	Report	Argyropoulos 5	Goals	seven players 1	Császár-Komjádi Béla Sport Swimming Pool, Budapest; Referees: Boris Margeta (SLO), Hendrik Schopp (GER)

8 October 2024; 18:00	Report	Jadran Split (Croatia)	15–13	(Serbia) Radnički Kragujevac	Sports Center Poljud, Split; Referees: Michiel Zwart (NED), Nikolaos Boudramis (GRE)
8 October 2024; 18:00	Report	Score by quarters: 2–0, 2–3, 3–2, 3–5 PSO: 5–3			Sports Center Poljud, Split; Referees: Michiel Zwart (NED), Nikolaos Boudramis (GRE)
8 October 2024; 18:00	Report	Fatović 5	Goals	Vićković 3	Sports Center Poljud, Split; Referees: Michiel Zwart (NED), Nikolaos Boudramis (GRE)

15 October 2024; 18:15	Report	Dinamo Tbilisi (Georgia (country))	10–16	(Croatia) Jadran Split	Olympic Swimming Pool, Tbilisi; Referees: Alex Marquez (ESP), Mihai George Balanescu (ROU)
15 October 2024; 18:15	Report	Score by quarters: 3–5, 3–2, 1–5, 3–4			Olympic Swimming Pool, Tbilisi; Referees: Alex Marquez (ESP), Mihai George Balanescu (ROU)
15 October 2024; 18:15	Report	three players 2	Goals	Marinić Kragić 4	Olympic Swimming Pool, Tbilisi; Referees: Alex Marquez (ESP), Mihai George Balanescu (ROU)

15 October 2024; 18:00	Report	Radnički Kragujevac (Serbia)	5–12	(Hungary) FTC-Telekom	Sports Center Park, Kragujevac; Referees: Boris Margeta (SLO), Georgios Stavridis (GRE)
15 October 2024; 18:00	Report	Score by quarters: 2–2, 1–3, 0–3, 2–4			Sports Center Park, Kragujevac; Referees: Boris Margeta (SLO), Georgios Stavridis (GRE)
15 October 2024; 18:00	Report	Drašović 2	Goals	Mandić 4	Sports Center Park, Kragujevac; Referees: Boris Margeta (SLO), Georgios Stavridis (GRE)

29 October 2024; 19:15	Report	Dinamo Tbilisi (Georgia (country))	9–10	(Serbia) Radnički Kragujevac	Olympic Swimming Pool, Tbilisi; Referees: Christos Courtidis (GRE), Alexandru-Andrei Mustata (ROU)
29 October 2024; 19:15	Report	Score by quarters: 2–0, 3–3, 1–2, 3–5			Olympic Swimming Pool, Tbilisi; Referees: Christos Courtidis (GRE), Alexandru-Andrei Mustata (ROU)
29 October 2024; 19:15	Report	three players 2	Goals	=Jaksic, Vasic 3	Olympic Swimming Pool, Tbilisi; Referees: Christos Courtidis (GRE), Alexandru-Andrei Mustata (ROU)

29 October 2024; 20:00	Report	FTC-Telekom (Hungary)	18–9	(Croatia) Jadran Split	Császár-Komjádi Béla Sport Swimming Pool, Budapest; Referees: Frank Ohme (GER), Xavier F. Buch (ESP)
29 October 2024; 20:00	Report	Score by quarters: 3–2, 3–3, 6–0, 6–4			Császár-Komjádi Béla Sport Swimming Pool, Budapest; Referees: Frank Ohme (GER), Xavier F. Buch (ESP)
29 October 2024; 20:00	Report	Argyropoulos 5	Goals	Butić 3	Császár-Komjádi Béla Sport Swimming Pool, Budapest; Referees: Frank Ohme (GER), Xavier F. Buch (ESP)

12 November 2024; 19:15	Report	Dinamo Tbilisi (Georgia (country))	7–18	(Hungary) FTC-Telekom	Olympic Swimming Pool, Tbilisi; Referees: Matan Schwartz (ISR), Mihnea Ioan Alexandrescu (ROU)
12 November 2024; 19:15	Report	Score by quarters: 2–5, 1–5, 3–4, 1–4			Olympic Swimming Pool, Tbilisi; Referees: Matan Schwartz (ISR), Mihnea Ioan Alexandrescu (ROU)
12 November 2024; 19:15	Report	Tankosić 2	Goals	Manhercz 4	Olympic Swimming Pool, Tbilisi; Referees: Matan Schwartz (ISR), Mihnea Ioan Alexandrescu (ROU)

12 November 2024; 20:00	Report	Radnički Kragujevac (Serbia)	11–14	(Croatia) Jadran Split	Sports Center Park, Kragujevac; Referees: Georgios Stavridis (GRE), Alessandro Severo (ITA)
12 November 2024; 20:00	Report	Score by quarters: 4–5, 3–2, 2–5, 2–2			Sports Center Park, Kragujevac; Referees: Georgios Stavridis (GRE), Alessandro Severo (ITA)
12 November 2024; 20:00	Report	Jaksic 4	Goals	five players 2	Sports Center Park, Kragujevac; Referees: Georgios Stavridis (GRE), Alessandro Severo (ITA)

20 November 2024; 18:15	Report	Jadran Split (Croatia)	12–5	(Georgia (country)) Dinamo Tbilisi	Sports Center Poljud, Split; Referees: Jaume Teixido (ESP), Veselin Miskovic (MNE)
20 November 2024; 18:15	Report	Score by quarters: 3–0, 4–1, 2–3, 3–1			Sports Center Poljud, Split; Referees: Jaume Teixido (ESP), Veselin Miskovic (MNE)
20 November 2024; 18:15	Report	Banićević 3	Goals	Akhvlediani 2	Sports Center Poljud, Split; Referees: Jaume Teixido (ESP), Veselin Miskovic (MNE)

20 November 2024; 20:00	Report	FTC-Telekom (Hungary)	16–4	(Serbia) Radnički Kragujevac	Császár-Komjádi Béla Sport Swimming Pool, Budapest; Referees: Pau Segurana (ESP), Hendrik Schopp (GER)
20 November 2024; 20:00	Report	Score by quarters: 4–1, 3–0, 5–2, 4–1			Császár-Komjádi Béla Sport Swimming Pool, Budapest; Referees: Pau Segurana (ESP), Hendrik Schopp (GER)
20 November 2024; 20:00	Report	Mandić, Manhercz 4	Goals	four players 1	Császár-Komjádi Béla Sport Swimming Pool, Budapest; Referees: Pau Segurana (ESP), Hendrik Schopp (GER)

3 December 2024; 19:00	Report	Radnički Kragujevac (Serbia)	8–6	(Georgia (country)) Dinamo Tbilisi	Sports Center Park, Kragujevac
3 December 2024; 19:00	Report	Score by quarters: 2–0, 3–2, 1–1, 2–3			Sports Center Park, Kragujevac
3 December 2024; 19:00	Report	Rašović 3	Goals	Vapenski 2	Sports Center Park, Kragujevac

4 December 2024; 18:15	Report	Jadran Split (Croatia)	10–12	(Hungary) FTC-Telekom	Sports Center Poljud, Split; Referees: Georgios Stavridis (GRE), Gernot Haentschel (GER)
4 December 2024; 18:15	Report	Score by quarters: 3–1, 4–3, 2–4, 1–4			Sports Center Poljud, Split; Referees: Georgios Stavridis (GRE), Gernot Haentschel (GER)
4 December 2024; 18:15	Report	Berehulak, Kragić 3	Goals	Argyropoulos, Varga 3	Sports Center Poljud, Split; Referees: Georgios Stavridis (GRE), Gernot Haentschel (GER)

=== Group C ===
Pos	Team	Pld	W	PSW	PSL	L	GF	GA	GD	Pts	Qualification	(Spain) BAR	(France) MAR	(Montenegro) JAD	(Hungary) VAS
1	(Spain) Zodiac Atlètic-Barceloneta	6	6	0	0	0	100	56	+44	18	Advance to Quarter-finals	—	19–14	18–7	18–7
2	(France) CN Marseille	6	3	0	0	3	69	67	+2	9	Advance to Quarter-finals	9–12	—	13–11	13–9
3	(Montenegro) Jadran Herceg Novi	6	2	0	0	4	61	73	−12	6	Transfer to Euro Cup	8–16	3–9	—	17–9
4	(Hungary) A-Híd Vasas Plaket	6	1	0	0	5	54	88	−34	3	Transfer to Euro Cup	10–15	13–11	6–14	—

Source: European Aquatics

9 October 2024; 19:00	Report	Zodiac Atlètic-Barceloneta (Spain)	18–7	(Hungary) A-Híd Vasas Plaket	Piscina Sant Sebastià, Barcelona; Referees: Nenad Peris (CRO), Raffaele Colombo (ITA)
9 October 2024; 19:00	Report	Score by quarters: 5–1, 4–1, 6–2, 3–3			Piscina Sant Sebastià, Barcelona; Referees: Nenad Peris (CRO), Raffaele Colombo (ITA)
9 October 2024; 19:00	Report	two players 4	Goals	Đurđić 2	Piscina Sant Sebastià, Barcelona; Referees: Nenad Peris (CRO), Raffaele Colombo (ITA)

9 October 2024; 19:00	Report	CN Marseille (France)	13–11	(Montenegro) Jadran Herceg Novi	Pierre Garsau Pool, Marseille
9 October 2024; 19:00	Report	Score by quarters: 4–4, 4–3, 2–1, 3–3			Pierre Garsau Pool, Marseille
9 October 2024; 19:00	Report	Vernoux 4	Goals	Kholod 3	Pierre Garsau Pool, Marseille

16 October 2024; 18:14	Report	Jadran Herceg Novi (Montenegro)	8–16	(Spain) Zodiac Atlètic-Barceloneta	Leotar Swimming Club, Trebinje (Note: Due to not having a venue that meets requirements, Jadran Herceg Novi plays their home games in Trebinje, Bosnia and Herzegovina.); Referees: Raffaele Colombo (ITA), Konstantinos Vasileiou (GRE)
16 October 2024; 18:14	Report	Score by quarters: 2–2, 2–4, 3–5, 1–5			Leotar Swimming Club, Trebinje; Referees: Raffaele Colombo (ITA), Konstantinos Vasileiou (GRE)
16 October 2024; 18:14	Report	two players 2	Goals	Granados 3	Leotar Swimming Club, Trebinje; Referees: Raffaele Colombo (ITA), Konstantinos Vasileiou (GRE)

16 October 2024; 18:15	Report	A-Híd Vasas Plaket (Hungary)	13–11	(France) CN Marseille	Császár-Komjádi Béla Sport Swimming Pool, Budapest; Referees: Vojin Putnikovic (SRB), Hendrik Schopp (GER)
16 October 2024; 18:15	Report	Score by quarters: 4–5, 3–1, 4–1, 2–4			Császár-Komjádi Béla Sport Swimming Pool, Budapest; Referees: Vojin Putnikovic (SRB), Hendrik Schopp (GER)
16 October 2024; 18:15	Report	Dedović 3	Goals	Velotto 3	Császár-Komjádi Béla Sport Swimming Pool, Budapest; Referees: Vojin Putnikovic (SRB), Hendrik Schopp (GER)

30 October 2024; 18:15	Report	A-Híd Vasas Plaket (Hungary)	6–14	(Montenegro) Jadran Herceg Novi	Császár-Komjádi Béla Sport Swimming Pool, Budapest; Referees: Georgios Stavridis (GRE), Nenad Peris (CRO)
30 October 2024; 18:15	Report	Score by quarters: 1–4, 1–3, 2–1, 2–6			Császár-Komjádi Béla Sport Swimming Pool, Budapest; Referees: Georgios Stavridis (GRE), Nenad Peris (CRO)
30 October 2024; 18:15	Report	two players 2	Goals	Kholod 5	Császár-Komjádi Béla Sport Swimming Pool, Budapest; Referees: Georgios Stavridis (GRE), Nenad Peris (CRO)

30 October 2024; 20:00	Report	Zodiac Atlètic-Barceloneta (Spain)	19–14	(France) CN Marseille	Piscina Sant Sebastià, Barcelona; Referees: Andrej Franulovic (CRO), Daniele Bianco (ITA)
30 October 2024; 20:00	Report	Score by quarters: 4–2, 5–5, 5–3, 5–4			Piscina Sant Sebastià, Barcelona; Referees: Andrej Franulovic (CRO), Daniele Bianco (ITA)
30 October 2024; 20:00	Report	Granados 6	Goals	Angyal 4	Piscina Sant Sebastià, Barcelona; Referees: Andrej Franulovic (CRO), Daniele Bianco (ITA)

12 November 2024; 18:15	Report	A-Híd Vasas Plaket (Hungary)	10–15	(Spain) Zodiac Atlètic-Barceloneta	Császár-Komjádi Béla Sport Swimming Pool, Budapest; Referees: Frank Ohme (GER), Christos Kourtidis (GRE)
12 November 2024; 18:15	Report	Score by quarters: 2–5, 3–5, 2–2, 3–3			Császár-Komjádi Béla Sport Swimming Pool, Budapest; Referees: Frank Ohme (GER), Christos Kourtidis (GRE)
12 November 2024; 18:15	Report	Đurđić 3	Goals	Granados, Vigvári 4	Császár-Komjádi Béla Sport Swimming Pool, Budapest; Referees: Frank Ohme (GER), Christos Kourtidis (GRE)

12 November 2024; 18:00	Report	Jadran Herceg Novi (Montenegro)	3–9	(France) CN Marseille	Leotar Swimming Club, Trebinje (Note: Due to not having a venue that meets requirements, Jadran Herceg Novi plays their home games in Trebinje, Bosnia and Herzegovina.); Referees: Michiel Zwart (NED), Gernot Haentschel (GER)
12 November 2024; 18:00	Report	Score by quarters: 0–4, 1–2, 0–1, 2–2			Leotar Swimming Club, Trebinje; Referees: Michiel Zwart (NED), Gernot Haentschel (GER)
12 November 2024; 18:00	Report	Ivović 2	Goals	Crousillat 3	Leotar Swimming Club, Trebinje; Referees: Michiel Zwart (NED), Gernot Haentschel (GER)

19 November 2024; 20:00	Report	CN Marseille (France)	13–9	(Hungary) A-Híd Vasas Plaket	Pierre Garsau Pool, Marseille; Referees: Nenad Peris (CRO), Daniele Bianco (ITA)
19 November 2024; 20:00	Report	Score by quarters: 3–4, 4–1, 4–1, 2–3			Pierre Garsau Pool, Marseille; Referees: Nenad Peris (CRO), Daniele Bianco (ITA)
19 November 2024; 20:00	Report	Crousillat 4	Goals	Durdic 5	Pierre Garsau Pool, Marseille; Referees: Nenad Peris (CRO), Daniele Bianco (ITA)

19 November 2024; 18:00	Report	Zodiac Atlètic-Barceloneta (Spain)	20–8	(Montenegro) Jadran Herceg Novi	Piscina Sant Sebastià, Barcelona; Referees: Alessandro Severo (ITA), Vojin Putnikovic (SRB)
19 November 2024; 18:00	Report	Score by quarters: 3–3, 5–1, 7–2, 5–2			Piscina Sant Sebastià, Barcelona; Referees: Alessandro Severo (ITA), Vojin Putnikovic (SRB)
19 November 2024; 18:00	Report	Tahull 4	Goals	Radovic 3	Piscina Sant Sebastià, Barcelona; Referees: Alessandro Severo (ITA), Vojin Putnikovic (SRB)

3 December 2024; 18:00	Report	Jadran Herceg Novi (Montenegro)	17–9	(Hungary) A-Híd Vasas Plaket	Leotar Swimming Club, Trebinje (Note: Due to not having a venue that meets requirements, Jadran Herceg Novi plays their home games in Trebinje, Bosnia and Herzegovina.); Referees: Raffaele Colombo (ITA), Mihai George Balanescu (ROU)
3 December 2024; 18:00	Report	Score by quarters: 4–3, 3–2, 6–3, 4–1			Leotar Swimming Club, Trebinje; Referees: Raffaele Colombo (ITA), Mihai George Balanescu (ROU)
3 December 2024; 18:00	Report	three players 3	Goals	three players 2	Leotar Swimming Club, Trebinje; Referees: Raffaele Colombo (ITA), Mihai George Balanescu (ROU)

3 December 2024; 18:00	Report	CN Marseille (France)	9–12	(Spain) Zodiac Atlètic-Barceloneta	Pierre Garsau Pool, Marseille; Referees: Boris Margeta (SLO), Frank Ohme (GER)
3 December 2024; 18:00	Report	Score by quarters: 2–4, 2–0, 1–2, 4–6			Pierre Garsau Pool, Marseille; Referees: Boris Margeta (SLO), Frank Ohme (GER)
3 December 2024; 18:00	Report	Bouet 3	Goals	Granados 4	Pierre Garsau Pool, Marseille; Referees: Boris Margeta (SLO), Frank Ohme (GER)

=== Group D ===
Pos	Team	Pld	W	PSW	PSL	L	GF	GA	GD	Pts	Qualification	(Greece) OLY	(Italy) SAV	(Spain) AST	(Montenegro) KOT
1	(Greece) Olympiacos Piraeus	6	3	2	0	1	91	68	+23	13	Advance to Quarter-finals	—	9–10	15–11	20–19 (Note: Match ended 12–12, Olympiacos Piraeus won 8–7 on penalties)
2	(Italy) RN Savona	6	3	1	1	1	74	69	+5	12	Advance to Quarter-finals	11–14 (Note: Match ended 11–11, Olympiacos Piraeus won 3–0 on penalties)	—	10–12	11–9
3	(Spain) Astrapool Sabadell	6	1	1	1	3	75	84	−9	6	Transfer to Euro Cup	8–15	13–14 (Note: Match ended 11–11, RN Savona won 3–2 on penalties)	—	15–16
4	(Montenegro) Primorac Kotor	6	1	0	2	3	79	98	−19	5	Transfer to Euro Cup	9–18	12–18	14–16 (Note: Match ended 11–11, Astrapool Sabadell won 5–3 on penalties)	—

Source: European Aquatics

9 October 2024; 19:15	Report	Olympiacos Piraeus (Greece)	20–19	(Montenegro) Primorac Kotor	Papastrateio Swimming Pool, Piraeus; Referees: Andrej Franulovic (CRO), Matan Schwartz (ISR)
9 October 2024; 19:15	Report	Score by quarters: 3–4, 5–3, 2–2, 2–3 PSO: 8–7			Papastrateio Swimming Pool, Piraeus; Referees: Andrej Franulovic (CRO), Matan Schwartz (ISR)
9 October 2024; 19:15	Report	Genidounias 4	Goals	four players 2	Papastrateio Swimming Pool, Piraeus; Referees: Andrej Franulovic (CRO), Matan Schwartz (ISR)

9 October 2024; 19:00	Report	RN Savona (Italy)	10–12	(Spain) Astrapool Sabadell	Piscina Carlo Zanelli, Savona; Referees: Tamas Kovacs-Csatlos (HUN), Vuk Milovic (SRB)
9 October 2024; 19:00	Report	Score by quarters: 2–3, 3–2, 2–4, 3–3			Piscina Carlo Zanelli, Savona; Referees: Tamas Kovacs-Csatlos (HUN), Vuk Milovic (SRB)
9 October 2024; 19:00	Report	Figlioli 3	Goals	three players 3	Piscina Carlo Zanelli, Savona; Referees: Tamas Kovacs-Csatlos (HUN), Vuk Milovic (SRB)

16 October 2024; 19:00	Report	Astrapool Sabadell (Spain)	8–15	(Greece) Olympiacos Piraeus	Can Llong pool, Sabadell; Referees: Nenad Peris (CRO), Ruben Sap (NED)
16 October 2024; 19:00	Report	Score by quarters: 3–1, 0–4, 3–6, 2–4			Can Llong pool, Sabadell; Referees: Nenad Peris (CRO), Ruben Sap (NED)
16 October 2024; 19:00	Report	Valera 3	Goals	Genidounias 5	Can Llong pool, Sabadell; Referees: Nenad Peris (CRO), Ruben Sap (NED)

16 October 2024; 19:00	Report	Primorac Kotor (Montenegro)	12–18	(Italy) RN Savona	Nikša Bućin Swimming Pool, Kotor; Referees: Gyorgy Kun (HUN), Julien Bourges (FRA)
16 October 2024; 19:00	Report	Score by quarters: 4–4, 4–6, 3–3, 1–5			Nikša Bućin Swimming Pool, Kotor; Referees: Gyorgy Kun (HUN), Julien Bourges (FRA)
16 October 2024; 19:00	Report	three players 2	Goals	four players 3	Nikša Bućin Swimming Pool, Kotor; Referees: Gyorgy Kun (HUN), Julien Bourges (FRA)

30 October 2024; 19:15	Report	Olympiacos Piraeus (Greece)	9–10	(Italy) RN Savona	Papastrateio Swimming Pool, Piraeus; Referees: Boris Margeta (SLO), Vojin Putnikovic (SRB)
30 October 2024; 19:15	Report	Score by quarters: 1–3, 4–2, 1–3, 3–2			Papastrateio Swimming Pool, Piraeus; Referees: Boris Margeta (SLO), Vojin Putnikovic (SRB)
30 October 2024; 19:15	Report	Genidounias 4	Goals	Merkulov 3	Papastrateio Swimming Pool, Piraeus; Referees: Boris Margeta (SLO), Vojin Putnikovic (SRB)

30 October 2024; 19:00	Report	Primorac Kotor (Montenegro)	14–16	(Spain) Astrapool Sabadell	Nikša Bućin Swimming Pool, Kotor; Referees: Tamas Kovacs-Csatlos (HUN), Gernot Haentschel (GER)
30 October 2024; 19:00	Report	Score by quarters: 5–4, 2–2, 0–2, 4–3 PSO: 3–5			Nikša Bućin Swimming Pool, Kotor; Referees: Tamas Kovacs-Csatlos (HUN), Gernot Haentschel (GER)
30 October 2024; 19:00	Report	Mršić 3	Goals	Averka 3	Nikša Bućin Swimming Pool, Kotor; Referees: Tamas Kovacs-Csatlos (HUN), Gernot Haentschel (GER)

12 November 2024; 18:15	Report	Primorac Kotor (Montenegro)	9–18	(Greece) Olympiacos Piraeus	Nikša Bućin Swimming Pool, Kotor; Referees: Rajmund Fodor (HUN), Peter De Jong (NED)
12 November 2024; 18:15	Report	Score by quarters: 1–4, 2–5, 3–5, 3–4			Nikša Bućin Swimming Pool, Kotor; Referees: Rajmund Fodor (HUN), Peter De Jong (NED)
12 November 2024; 18:15	Report	three players 2	Goals	Dimou 5	Nikša Bućin Swimming Pool, Kotor; Referees: Rajmund Fodor (HUN), Peter De Jong (NED)

12 November 2024; 18:00	Report	Astrapool Sabadell (Spain)	13–14	(Italy) RN Savona	Can Llong pool, Sabadell; Referees: Andrej Franulovic (CRO), Ivan Rakovic (SRB)
12 November 2024; 18:00	Report	Score by quarters: 2–3, 2–3, 4–4, 3–1 PSO: 2–3			Can Llong pool, Sabadell; Referees: Andrej Franulovic (CRO), Ivan Rakovic (SRB)
12 November 2024; 18:00	Report	Averka, Macarro 4	Goals	Figlioli 5	Can Llong pool, Sabadell; Referees: Andrej Franulovic (CRO), Ivan Rakovic (SRB)

19 November 2024; 19:15	Report	Olympiacos Piraeus (Greece)	15–11	(Spain) Astrapool Sabadell	Papastrateio Swimming Pool, Piraeus; Referees: Michiel Zwart (NED), Ante Bura (CRO)
19 November 2024; 19:15	Report	Score by quarters: 3–3, 5–3, 5–3, 2–2			Papastrateio Swimming Pool, Piraeus; Referees: Michiel Zwart (NED), Ante Bura (CRO)
19 November 2024; 19:15	Report	Fountoulis 4	Goals	Macarro 4	Papastrateio Swimming Pool, Piraeus; Referees: Michiel Zwart (NED), Ante Bura (CRO)

19 November 2024; 18:00	Report	RN Savona (Italy)	11–9	(Montenegro) Primorac Kotor	Piscina Carlo Zanelli, Savona; Referees: Tamas Kovacs-Csatlos (HUN), Frank Ohme (GER)
19 November 2024; 18:00	Report	Score by quarters: 2–2, 4–3, 2–3, 3–1			Piscina Carlo Zanelli, Savona; Referees: Tamas Kovacs-Csatlos (HUN), Frank Ohme (GER)
19 November 2024; 18:00	Report	Figlioli 5	Goals	three players 2	Piscina Carlo Zanelli, Savona; Referees: Tamas Kovacs-Csatlos (HUN), Frank Ohme (GER)

3 December 2024; 18:00	Report	RN Savona (Italy)	11–14	(Greece) Olympiacos Piraeus	Piscina Carlo Zanelli, Savona; Referees: Nenad Peris (CRO), Gyorgy Kun (HUN)
3 December 2024; 18:00	Report	Score by quarters: 3–2, 3–3, 4–2, 1–4 PSO: 0–3			Piscina Carlo Zanelli, Savona; Referees: Nenad Peris (CRO), Gyorgy Kun (HUN)
3 December 2024; 18:00	Report	Figlioli 3	Goals	Dimou 3	Piscina Carlo Zanelli, Savona; Referees: Nenad Peris (CRO), Gyorgy Kun (HUN)

3 December 2024; 18:00	Report	Astrapool Sabadell (Spain)	15–16	(Montenegro) Primorac Kotor	Can Llong pool, Sabadell; Referees: Vuk Milovic (SRB), Rik Evers (NED)
3 December 2024; 18:00	Report	Score by quarters: 5–4, 2–7, 3–2, 5–3			Can Llong pool, Sabadell; Referees: Vuk Milovic (SRB), Rik Evers (NED)
3 December 2024; 18:00	Report	three players 3	Goals	Shushiashvili 4	Can Llong pool, Sabadell; Referees: Vuk Milovic (SRB), Rik Evers (NED)

== See also ==
- 2024–25 European Aquatics Champions League
- 2024–25 European Aquatics Euro Cup
- 2024–25 European Aquatics Challenger Cup
- 2024 European Aquatics Super Cup
- 2024–25 European Aquatics Women's Champions League
- 2024–25 European Aquatics Women's Euro Cup
- 2024–25 European Aquatics Women's Challenger Cup
- 2024 European Aquatics Women's Super Cup
