= 2025–26 European Aquatics Champions League Final Four =

Women's water polo competition

Tournament details
- Host country: Malta
- Venue: 1 (in 1 host city)
- Dates: 11–13 June
- Teams: 4

Final positions
- Champions: (Spain) Zodiac Atlètic-Barceloneta (2nd title)
- Runners-up: (Italy) Pro Recco
- Third place: (Hungary) FTC-Telekom
- Fourth place: (Greece) Olympiacos Piraeus

Tournament statistics
- Matches played: 4
- Goals scored: 118 (29.5 per match)

The 2025–26 European Aquatics Champions League Final Four was the season-ending event to decide the champions of the 2025–26 European Aquatics Champions League. The Final Four tournament was held at the National Pool Complex in Valletta, Malta, in conjunction with the women's Final Four.

On 23 May 2026, Spanish women's player Maica García Godoy and Greek men's player Christos Afroudakis were announced as the ambassadors of the Final Four.

The winners were Zodiac Atlètic-Barceloneta, who won their second title by triumphing over Pro Recco in the final.

== Host selection ==
On 17 November 2025, European Aquatics announced that Valletta, Malta, will host the men's Final Four in conjunction with the women's one for the first time.

== Venue ==
The venue for this competition will be the National Pool Complex in Valletta, Malta. The capacity is 3,000. A fan zone will be operated during the Final Four. On 18 May 2026, tickets were put on sale.

== Teams ==
Teams qualified by finishing first and second in the 2025–26 European Aquatics Champions League Quarter-finals round.

=== Group A ===
| Pos | Team | Pld | W | PSW | PSL | L | GF | GA | GD | Pts | Qualification |
|---|---|---|---|---|---|---|---|---|---|---|---|
| 1 | (Spain) Zodiac Atlètic-Barceloneta | 6 | 6 | 0 | 0 | 0 | 97 | 69 | +28 | **18** | Final Four |
| 2 | (Greece) Olympiacos Piraeus | 6 | 2 | 1 | 0 | 3 | 73 | 81 | −8 | **8** | Final Four |
| 3 | (Italy) AN Brescia | 6 | 2 | 0 | 1 | 3 | 69 | 83 | −14 | **7** | |
| 4 | (Serbia) Novi Beograd Tehnomanija | 6 | 1 | 0 | 0 | 5 | 85 | 91 | −6 | **3** | |

Source: European Aquatics Champions League

=== Group B ===
| Pos | Team | Pld | W | PSW | PSL | L | GF | GA | GD | Pts | Qualification |
|---|---|---|---|---|---|---|---|---|---|---|---|
| 1 | (Italy) Pro Recco | 6 | 5 | 0 | 0 | 1 | 96 | 72 | +24 | **15 (Note: Pro Recco 27–25 FTC-Telekom)** | Final Four |
| 2 | (Hungary) FTC-Telekom | 6 | 5 | 0 | 0 | 1 | 94 | 68 | +26 | **15** | Final Four |
| 3 | (Croatia) HAVK Mladost Zagreb | 6 | 1 | 0 | 0 | 5 | 70 | 84 | −14 | **3 (Note: HAVK Mladost Zagreb 26–23 Waspo'98 Hannover)** | |
| 4 | (Germany) Waspo'98 Hannover | 6 | 1 | 0 | 0 | 5 | 67 | 103 | −36 | **3** | |

Source: European Aquatics Champions League

=== Qualified teams ===
| Team | Qualified date | Participations (Note: Including Final Six and Eights tournaments.) (bold indicates winners) | Ref |
|---|---|---|---|
| (Spain) Zodiac Atlètic-Barceloneta | 22 April 2026 | 10 (2013, **2014**, 2015, 2016, 2018, 2019, 2021, 2022, 2023, 2025) | |
| (Hungary) FTC-Telekom | 12 May 2026 | 6 (**2019**, 2021, 2022, 2023, **2024**, **2025**) | |
| (Italy) Pro Recco | 12 May 2026 | 20 (**2003**, 2005, 2006, **2007**, **2008**, 2009, 2000, 2011, **2012**, 2013, **2014**, **2015**, 2016, 2017, 2018, 2019, **2021**, **2022**, **2023**, 2024) | |
| (Greece) Olympiacos Piraeus | 13 May 2026 | 9 (2001, **2002**, 2007, 2016, 2017, 2019, 2021, 2023, 2024) | |

== Referees ==
These referees were chosen for the Final Four.

Referees
| Croatia | Andrej Franulović |
| France | Julien Bourges |
| Germany | Frank Ohme |
| Israel | Matan Schwartz |
| Italy | Raffaele Colombo |
| Netherlands | Michiel Zwart |

== Bracket ==
Semi-finals
(Spain) Zodiac Atlètic-Barceloneta | 13
(Hungary) FTC-Telekom | 11
(Italy) Pro Recco | 19
(Greece) Olympiacos Piraeus | 13

Final
(Spain) Zodiac Atlètic-Barceloneta | 17
(Italy) Pro Recco | 16
Third place
(Hungary) FTC-Telekom | 16
(Greece) Olympiacos Piraeus | 13

=== Semi-finals ===
| 11 June 2026; 19:00 | Report | Zodiac Atlètic-Barceloneta (Spain) | 13–11 (PSO) | (Hungary) FTC-Telekom | National Pool Complex, Valletta; Referees: Michiel Zwart (NED), Frank Ohme (GER) |
| 11 June 2026; 19:00 | Report | Score by quarters: 3–2, 3–1, 1–3, 2–3 PSO: 4–2 | | | National Pool Complex, Valletta; Referees: Michiel Zwart (NED), Frank Ohme (GER) |
| 11 June 2026; 19:00 | Report | Velotto 4 | Goals | Manhercz, Fekete 2 | National Pool Complex, Valletta; Referees: Michiel Zwart (NED), Frank Ohme (GER) |

| 11 June 2026; 21:00 | Report | Pro Recco (Italy) | 19–13 | (Greece) Olympiacos Piraeus | National Pool Complex, Valletta; Referees: Andrej Franulović (CRO), Matan Schwartz (ISR) |
| 11 June 2026; 21:00 | Report | Score by quarters: 8–4, 5–3, 3–2, 3–4 | | | National Pool Complex, Valletta; Referees: Andrej Franulović (CRO), Matan Schwartz (ISR) |
| 11 June 2026; 21:00 | Report | Granados, Irving 4 | Goals | Zalánki 4 | National Pool Complex, Valletta; Referees: Andrej Franulović (CRO), Matan Schwartz (ISR) |

=== Third place match ===
| 13 June 2026; 19:00 | Report | FTC-Telekom (Hungary) | 16–13 | (Greece) Olympiacos Piraeus | National Pool Complex, Valletta; Referees: Raffaele Colombo (ITA), Frank Ohme (GER) |
| 13 June 2026; 19:00 | Report | Score by quarters: 5–4, 4–5, 2–2, 5–2 | | | National Pool Complex, Valletta; Referees: Raffaele Colombo (ITA), Frank Ohme (GER) |
| 13 June 2026; 19:00 | Report | Mandić, Vámos 3 | Goals | four players 2 | National Pool Complex, Valletta; Referees: Raffaele Colombo (ITA), Frank Ohme (GER) |

=== Final ===
| 13 June 2026; 21:00 | Report | Zodiac Atlètic-Barceloneta (Spain) | 17–16 | (Italy) Pro Recco | National Pool Complex, Valletta; Referees: Andrej Franulović (CRO), Julien Bourges (FRA) |
| 13 June 2026; 21:00 | Report | Score by quarters: 6–6, 5–6, 3–2, 3–2 | | | National Pool Complex, Valletta; Referees: Andrej Franulović (CRO), Julien Bourges (FRA) |
| 13 June 2026; 21:00 | Report | Burián, Biel 3 | Goals | Gratta, Condemi 3 | National Pool Complex, Valletta; Referees: Andrej Franulović (CRO), Julien Bourges (FRA) |

2025–26 European Aquatics Champions League Champions

Zodiac Atlètic-Barceloneta
2nd title

== See also ==
- 2025–26 European Aquatics Euro Cup
- 2025–26 European Aquatics Conference Cup
- 2025–26 European Aquatics Challenger Cup
- 2025 European Aquatics Super Cup
- 2025–26 European Aquatics Women's Champions League
- 2025–26 European Aquatics Women's Euro Cup
- 2025–26 European Aquatics Women's Conference Cup
- 2025–26 European Aquatics Women's Challenger Cup
- 2025 European Aquatics Women's Super Cup

Reference
[ Semifinals]
[ Third place and Final]

Reference
[ Semifinals]
[ Third place and Final]
