= Romanian Superliga =

Romanian Superliga (Romanian: Superliga română) may refer to:

- Romanian Superliga (water polo)
- Liga I
- Romanian Superliga (women's football)
