= 2024–25 European Aquatics Champions League quarter-finals round =

Tournament information
- Sport: Water polo
- Dates: 4 February–14 May 2025
- Teams: 8
- Website: Official website

The 2024–25 European Aquatics Champions League quarter-finals round is played between 4 February and 14 May 2025 to determine the four teams advancing to the Final Four of the 2024–25 European Aquatics Champions League.

== Format ==
The four group winners and four group runners-up were drawn into two groups, with each one containing two group winners and two group runners-up. In each group, teams will play against each other home-and-away in a round-robin format. The top two teams in each group advanced to the Final Four.

Teams are ranked according to points (3 points for a win, 2 points for a penalty shootout win, 1 point for a penalty shootout loss, 0 points for a loss), and if tied on points, the following tiebreaking criteria are applied, in the order given, to determine the rankings:

- Points in head-to-head matches among tied teams;
- Goal difference in head-to-head matches among tied teams;
- Goals scored in head-to-head matches among tied teams;
- Goal difference in all group matches;
- Goals scored in all group matches.

== Draw ==
The draw took place in Zagreb on 11 December. The seeded and unseeded clubs consist of the teams that finished first and second in the previous round respectively. The only restriction was that clubs from the same group in the Main round could not be drawn against each other.

Key to colours
Group winners and runners-up advance to Final Four

Seeded Team (Serbia) Novi Beograd (Hungary) FTC-Telekom (Spain) Zodiac Atlètic-Barceloneta (Greece) Olympiacos Piraeus	Unseeded Team (Romania) CSM Oradea (Croatia) Jadran Split (France) CN Marseille (Italy) RN Savona

== Groups ==
=== Group A ===
Pos	Team	Pld	W	PSW	PSL	L	GF	GA	GD	Pts	Qualification	(Serbia) NOV	(France) MAR	(Greece) OLY	(Croatia) JAD
1	(Serbia) Novi Beograd	6	5	0	0	1	80	63	+17	15	Final Four	—	15–14	16–15	17–8
2	(France) CN Marseille	6	4	0	0	2	77	58	+19	12	Final Four	14–9	—	12–7	11–9
3	(Greece) Olympiacos Piraeus	6	2	0	1	3	64	69	−5	7		5–8	12–8	—	13–14 (Note: Match ended 9–9, Jadran Split won 7–6 on penalties.)
4	(Croatia) Jadran Split	6	0	1	0	5	55	86	−31	2		7–15	6–18	11–12	—

Source: European Aquatics

4 February 2025; 20:00	Report	Novi Beograd (Serbia)	15–14	(France) CN Marseille	11th April Sports and Recreation Center, Belgrade; Referees: Michiel Zwart (NED), David Gomez (ESP)
4 February 2025; 20:00	Report	Score by quarters: 2–3, 4–3, 5–2, 4–6			11th April Sports and Recreation Center, Belgrade; Referees: Michiel Zwart (NED), David Gomez (ESP)
4 February 2025; 20:00	Report	Vlachopoulos 4	Goals	Prlainović 5	11th April Sports and Recreation Center, Belgrade; Referees: Michiel Zwart (NED), David Gomez (ESP)

4 February 2025; 20:00	Report	Jadran Split (Croatia)	11–12	(Greece) Olympiacos Piraeus	Sports Center Poljud, Split; Referees: Tamas Kovacs-Csatlos (HUN), Alessandro Severo (ITA)
4 February 2025; 20:00	Report	Score by quarters: 0–2, 4–4, 3–4, 4–2			Sports Center Poljud, Split; Referees: Tamas Kovacs-Csatlos (HUN), Alessandro Severo (ITA)
4 February 2025; 20:00	Report	four players 2	Goals	Genidounias 5	Sports Center Poljud, Split; Referees: Tamas Kovacs-Csatlos (HUN), Alessandro Severo (ITA)

25 February 2025; 20:00	Report	Olympiacos Piraeus (Greece)	5–8	(Serbia) Novi Beograd	Papastrateio Swimming Pool, Piraeus; Referees: Boris Margeta (SLO), Gyorgy Kun (HUN)
25 February 2025; 20:00	Report	Score by quarters: 0–0, 1–2, 2–3, 2–3			Papastrateio Swimming Pool, Piraeus; Referees: Boris Margeta (SLO), Gyorgy Kun (HUN)
25 February 2025; 20:00	Report	Genidounias 2	Goals	three players 2	Papastrateio Swimming Pool, Piraeus; Referees: Boris Margeta (SLO), Gyorgy Kun (HUN)

25 February 2025; 20:00	Report	CN Marseille (France)	11–9	(Croatia) Jadran Split	Pierre Garsau Pool, Marseille; Referees: Raffaele Colombo (ITA), Pau Segurana (ESP)
25 February 2025; 20:00	Report	Score by quarters: 3–2, 3–4, 2–2, 3–1			Pierre Garsau Pool, Marseille; Referees: Raffaele Colombo (ITA), Pau Segurana (ESP)
25 February 2025; 20:00	Report	three players 2	Goals	Berehulak, Duzevic 2	Pierre Garsau Pool, Marseille; Referees: Raffaele Colombo (ITA), Pau Segurana (ESP)

18 March 2025; 20:00	Report	Novi Beograd (Serbia)	17–8	(Croatia) Jadran Split	11th April Sports and Recreation Center, Belgrade; Referees: Xavier F. Buch (ESP), Tamas Kovacs-Csatlos (HUN)
18 March 2025; 20:00	Report	Score by quarters: 4–3, 5–1, 3–4, 5–0			11th April Sports and Recreation Center, Belgrade; Referees: Xavier F. Buch (ESP), Tamas Kovacs-Csatlos (HUN)
18 March 2025; 20:00	Report	Cuk 4	Goals	Butic 3	11th April Sports and Recreation Center, Belgrade; Referees: Xavier F. Buch (ESP), Tamas Kovacs-Csatlos (HUN)

18 March 2025; 20:00	Report	CN Marseille (France)	12–7	(Greece) Olympiacos Piraeus	Pierre Garsau Pool, Marseille; Referees: Michiel Zwart (NED), Alessandro Severo (ITA)
18 March 2025; 20:00	Report	Score by quarters: 2–2, 5–3, 2–1, 3–1			Pierre Garsau Pool, Marseille; Referees: Michiel Zwart (NED), Alessandro Severo (ITA)
18 March 2025; 20:00	Report	three players 3	Goals	Dimou 2	Pierre Garsau Pool, Marseille; Referees: Michiel Zwart (NED), Alessandro Severo (ITA)

1 April 2025; 21:00	Report	CN Marseille (France)	14–9	(Serbia) Novi Beograd	Pierre Garsau Pool, Marseille; Referees: Boris Margeta (SLO), Hendrik Schopp (GER)
1 April 2025; 21:00	Report	Score by quarters: 2–1, 6–3, 4–0, 2–5			Pierre Garsau Pool, Marseille; Referees: Boris Margeta (SLO), Hendrik Schopp (GER)
1 April 2025; 21:00	Report	Angyal, Larumbe 3	Goals	Gladović, Lukic 2	Pierre Garsau Pool, Marseille; Referees: Boris Margeta (SLO), Hendrik Schopp (GER)

1 April 2025; 21:00	Report	Olympiacos Piraeus (Greece)	13–14 (PSO)	(Croatia) Jadran Split	Papastrateio Swimming Pool, Piraeus; Referees: Raffaele Colombo (ITA), David Gomez (ESP)
1 April 2025; 21:00	Report	Score by quarters: 2–1, 2–1, 2–1, 1–4 PSO: 6–7			Papastrateio Swimming Pool, Piraeus; Referees: Raffaele Colombo (ITA), David Gomez (ESP)
1 April 2025; 21:00	Report	seven players 1	Goals	Fatović 3	Papastrateio Swimming Pool, Piraeus; Referees: Raffaele Colombo (ITA), David Gomez (ESP)

22 April 2025; 21:00	Report	Novi Beograd (Serbia)	16–15	(Greece) Olympiacos Piraeus	11th April Sports and Recreation Center, Belgrade; Referees: Xavier F. Buch (ESP), Tamas Kovacs-Csatlos (HUN)
22 April 2025; 21:00	Report	Score by quarters: 5–3, 6–5, 2–2, 3–5			11th April Sports and Recreation Center, Belgrade; Referees: Xavier F. Buch (ESP), Tamas Kovacs-Csatlos (HUN)
22 April 2025; 21:00	Report	Vlachopoulos 4	Goals	Genidounias 4	11th April Sports and Recreation Center, Belgrade; Referees: Xavier F. Buch (ESP), Tamas Kovacs-Csatlos (HUN)

22 April 2025; 21:00	Report	Jadran Split (Croatia)	6–18	(France) CN Marseille	Sports Center Poljud, Split; Referees: Frank Ohme (GER), Matan Schwartz (ISR)
22 April 2025; 21:00	Report	Score by quarters: 0–4, 2–4, 1–5, 3–5			Sports Center Poljud, Split; Referees: Frank Ohme (GER), Matan Schwartz (ISR)
22 April 2025; 21:00	Report	Fatović, Butić 2	Goals	Bouet 5	Sports Center Poljud, Split; Referees: Frank Ohme (GER), Matan Schwartz (ISR)

14 May 2025; 20:00	Report	Jadran Split (Croatia)	7–15	(Serbia) Novi Beograd	Sports Center Poljud, Split; Referees: Alessandro Severo (ITA), Peter de Jong (NED)
14 May 2025; 20:00	Report	Score by quarters: 3–4, 2–5, 1–2, 1–4			Sports Center Poljud, Split; Referees: Alessandro Severo (ITA), Peter de Jong (NED)
14 May 2025; 20:00	Report	Cuzzi 4	Goals	three players 3	Sports Center Poljud, Split; Referees: Alessandro Severo (ITA), Peter de Jong (NED)

14 May 2025; 20:00	Report	Olympiacos Piraeus (Greece)	12–8	(France) CN Marseille	Papastrateio Swimming Pool, Piraeus; Referees: Matan Schwartz (ISR), Raffaele Colombo (ITA)
14 May 2025; 20:00	Report	Score by quarters: 4–1, 1–1, 4–4, 3–2			Papastrateio Swimming Pool, Piraeus; Referees: Matan Schwartz (ISR), Raffaele Colombo (ITA)
14 May 2025; 20:00	Report	Gkillas 3	Goals	three players 2	Papastrateio Swimming Pool, Piraeus; Referees: Matan Schwartz (ISR), Raffaele Colombo (ITA)

=== Group B ===
Pos	Team	Pld	W	PSW	PSL	L	GF	GA	GD	Pts	Qualification	(Hungary) FTC	(Spain) BAR	(Italy) SAV	(Romania) ORA
1	(Hungary) FTC-Telekom	6	5	0	1	0	100	60	+40	16	Final Four	—	18–10	15–11	20–10
2	(Spain) Zodiac Atlètic-Barceloneta	6	4	1	0	1	85	62	+23	14	Final Four	13–12 (Note: Match ended 9–9, Zodiac Atlètic-Barceloneta won 4–3 on penalties.)	—	17–10	17–4
3	(Italy) RN Savona	6	2	0	0	4	71	83	−12	6		9–17	10–14	—	14–9
4	(Romania) CSM Oradea	6	0	0	0	6	49	100	−51	0		7–18	8–14	11–17	—

Source: European Aquatics

5 February 2025; 20:00	Report	FTC-Telekom (Hungary)	18–10	(Spain) Zodiac Atlètic-Barceloneta	Császár-Komjádi Béla Sport Swimming Pool, Budapest; Referees: Georgios Stavridis (GRE), Andej Franulovic (CRO)
5 February 2025; 20:00	Report	Score by quarters: 4–1, 6–4, 6–3, 2–2			Császár-Komjádi Béla Sport Swimming Pool, Budapest; Referees: Georgios Stavridis (GRE), Andej Franulovic (CRO)
5 February 2025; 20:00	Report	Di Somma 4	Goals	Sanahuja Carné 4	Császár-Komjádi Béla Sport Swimming Pool, Budapest; Referees: Georgios Stavridis (GRE), Andej Franulovic (CRO)

4 February 2025; 21:00	Report	CSM Oradea (Romania)	11–17	(Italy) RN Savona	Bazinul Olimpic Ioan Alexandrescu, Oradea; Referees: Matan Schwartz (ISR), Vujin Putnikovic (SRB)
4 February 2025; 21:00	Report	Score by quarters: 2–1, 4–7, 2–5, 3–4			Bazinul Olimpic Ioan Alexandrescu, Oradea; Referees: Matan Schwartz (ISR), Vujin Putnikovic (SRB)
4 February 2025; 21:00	Report	Gusarov 4	Goals	Damonte 4	Bazinul Olimpic Ioan Alexandrescu, Oradea; Referees: Matan Schwartz (ISR), Vujin Putnikovic (SRB)

26 February 2025; 20:00	Report	Zodiac Atlètic-Barceloneta (Spain)	17–4	(Romania) CSM Oradea	Piscina Sant Sebastià, Barcelona; Referees: Julien Bourges (FRA), Veselin Miskovic (MNE)
26 February 2025; 20:00	Report	Score by quarters: 2–1, 3–0, 6–2, 6–1			Piscina Sant Sebastià, Barcelona; Referees: Julien Bourges (FRA), Veselin Miskovic (MNE)
26 February 2025; 20:00	Report	Granados 4	Goals	Velkic 2	Piscina Sant Sebastià, Barcelona; Referees: Julien Bourges (FRA), Veselin Miskovic (MNE)

26 February 2025; 20:00	Report	RN Savona (Italy)	9–17	(Hungary) FTC-Telekom	Piscina Carlo Zanelli, Savona; Referees: Ivan Rakovic (SRB), Frank Ohme (GER)
26 February 2025; 20:00	Report	Score by quarters: 1–5, 4–4, 3–4, 1–4			Piscina Carlo Zanelli, Savona; Referees: Ivan Rakovic (SRB), Frank Ohme (GER)
26 February 2025; 20:00	Report	Patchaliev 3	Goals	Manhercz 4	Piscina Carlo Zanelli, Savona; Referees: Ivan Rakovic (SRB), Frank Ohme (GER)

18 March 2025; 20:00	Report	RN Savona (Italy)	10–14	(Spain) Zodiac Atlètic-Barceloneta	Piscina Carlo Zanelli, Savona; Referees: Peter de Jong (NED), Spyridon Achladiotis (GRE)
18 March 2025; 20:00	Report	Score by quarters: 3–2, 2–5, 3–2, 2–5			Piscina Carlo Zanelli, Savona; Referees: Peter de Jong (NED), Spyridon Achladiotis (GRE)
18 March 2025; 20:00	Report	Guidi, Patchaliev 3	Goals	Vigvari 4	Piscina Carlo Zanelli, Savona; Referees: Peter de Jong (NED), Spyridon Achladiotis (GRE)

18 March 2025; 21:00	Report	CSM Oradea (Romania)	7–18	(Hungary) FTC-Telekom	Bazinul Olimpic Ioan Alexandrescu, Oradea; Referees: Ante Bura (CRO), Konstantinos Vasileiou (GRE)
18 March 2025; 21:00	Report	Score by quarters: 1–5, 1–5, 4–4, 1–4			Bazinul Olimpic Ioan Alexandrescu, Oradea; Referees: Ante Bura (CRO), Konstantinos Vasileiou (GRE)
18 March 2025; 21:00	Report	Vancsik 3	Goals	Argyropoulos, Di Somma 4	Bazinul Olimpic Ioan Alexandrescu, Oradea; Referees: Ante Bura (CRO), Konstantinos Vasileiou (GRE)

1 April 2025; 20:00	Report	RN Savona (Italy)	14–9	(Romania) CSM Oradea	Piscina Carlo Zanelli, Savona; Referees: Nikolaos Boudramis (GRE), Sinisa Matijasevic (MNE)
1 April 2025; 20:00	Report	Score by quarters: 4–1, 3–1, 2–2, 5–5			Piscina Carlo Zanelli, Savona; Referees: Nikolaos Boudramis (GRE), Sinisa Matijasevic (MNE)
1 April 2025; 20:00	Report	Gullotta 3	Goals	Gardasevic 5	Piscina Carlo Zanelli, Savona; Referees: Nikolaos Boudramis (GRE), Sinisa Matijasevic (MNE)

1 April 2025; 20:00	Report	Zodiac Atlètic-Barceloneta (Spain)	13–12 (PSO)	(Hungary) FTC-Telekom	Piscina Sant Sebastià, Barcelona; Referees: Michiel Zwart (NED), Sebastien Dervieux (FRA)
1 April 2025; 20:00	Report	Score by quarters: 3–1, 2–3, 2–3, 2–2 PSO: 4–3			Piscina Sant Sebastià, Barcelona; Referees: Michiel Zwart (NED), Sebastien Dervieux (FRA)
1 April 2025; 20:00	Report	Vigvári 2	Goals	Argyropoulos, Ákos 2	Piscina Sant Sebastià, Barcelona; Referees: Michiel Zwart (NED), Sebastien Dervieux (FRA)

22 April 2025; 20:00	Report	CSM Oradea (Romania)	8–14	(Spain) Zodiac Atlètic-Barceloneta	Bazinul Olimpic Ioan Alexandrescu, Oradea; Referees: Ivan Rakovic (SRB), Konstantinos Vasileiou (GRE)
22 April 2025; 20:00	Report	Score by quarters: 2–3, 3–2, 3–5, 0–4			Bazinul Olimpic Ioan Alexandrescu, Oradea; Referees: Ivan Rakovic (SRB), Konstantinos Vasileiou (GRE)
22 April 2025; 20:00	Report	Gardasevic 3	Goals	Granados 4	Bazinul Olimpic Ioan Alexandrescu, Oradea; Referees: Ivan Rakovic (SRB), Konstantinos Vasileiou (GRE)

22 April 2025; 20:00	Report	FTC-Telekom (Hungary)	15–11	(Italy) RN Savona	Császár-Komjádi Béla Sport Swimming Pool, Budapest; Referees: Julien Bourges (FRA), Andej Franulovic (CRO)
22 April 2025; 20:00	Report	Score by quarters: 5–1, 3–4, 2–3, 5–3			Császár-Komjádi Béla Sport Swimming Pool, Budapest; Referees: Julien Bourges (FRA), Andej Franulovic (CRO)
22 April 2025; 20:00	Report	Argyropoulos 4	Goals	Rizzo 3	Császár-Komjádi Béla Sport Swimming Pool, Budapest; Referees: Julien Bourges (FRA), Andej Franulovic (CRO)

14 May 2025; 20:00	Report	FTC-Telekom (Hungary)	20–10	(Romania) CSM Oradea	Császár-Komjádi Béla Sport Swimming Pool, Budapest; Referees: Spyridon Achladiotis (GRE), Maro Savinovic (CRO)
14 May 2025; 20:00	Report	Score by quarters: 5–1, 6–4, 5–1, 4–4			Császár-Komjádi Béla Sport Swimming Pool, Budapest; Referees: Spyridon Achladiotis (GRE), Maro Savinovic (CRO)
14 May 2025; 20:00	Report	Argyropoulos, Varga 3	Goals	Gardasevic 5	Császár-Komjádi Béla Sport Swimming Pool, Budapest; Referees: Spyridon Achladiotis (GRE), Maro Savinovic (CRO)

14 May 2025; 20:00	Report	Zodiac Atlètic-Barceloneta (Spain)	17–10	(Italy) RN Savona	Piscina Sant Sebastià, Barcelona; Referees: Frank Ohme (GER), Ante Bura (CRO)
14 May 2025; 20:00	Report	Score by quarters: 3–1, 4–1, 5–3, 5–5			Piscina Sant Sebastià, Barcelona; Referees: Frank Ohme (GER), Ante Bura (CRO)
14 May 2025; 20:00	Report	Granados, Tahull 3	Goals	Vavic 4	Piscina Sant Sebastià, Barcelona; Referees: Frank Ohme (GER), Ante Bura (CRO)

== See also ==
- 2024–25 European Aquatics Champions League
- 2024–25 European Aquatics Euro Cup
- 2024–25 European Aquatics Challenger Cup
- 2024 European Aquatics Super Cup
- 2024–25 European Aquatics Women's Champions League
- 2024–25 European Aquatics Women's Euro Cup
- 2024–25 European Aquatics Women's Challenger Cup
- 2024 European Aquatics Women's Super Cup
