= Nikola Lukić =

Nikola Lukić may refer to:

- Nikola Lukić (footballer)
- Nikola Lukić (water polo)
