= Romanian Superliga (water polo) =

- No. of teams: 8
- Country: Romania
- Most recent champion: Steaua București (2025-26)
- Most titles: Dinamo București (32 titles)
- Level on pyramid: 1
- Website: Romanian Water Polo Federation

The Romanian Superliga is the men's top Romanian professional water polo league.

== 2021–22 teams ==
Eight teams take part in the 2021-22 season:

- Crișul Oradea
- CSM Oradea
- Dinamo București
- Politehnica Cluj
- Rapid București
- Sportul Studențesc
- Steaua București
- Hello Sport

== Previous winners ==
- 1928 AS Oradea
- 1929 Universitatea Cluj
- 1930 Universitatea Cluj (2)
- 1931 Universitatea Cluj (3)
- 1932 Universitatea Cluj (4)
- 1933 Târgu Mureș
- 1934 CFR București
- 1935 CFR București (2)
- 1936 Târgu Mureș (2)
- 1937 not held
- 1938 Viforul Dacia
- 1939 Viforul Dacia (2)
- 1940 CFR București (3)
- 1941–42 Not held due to WW II
- 1943 CFR București (4)
- 1944 Not held due to WW II
- 1945 Târgu Mureș (3)
- 1946 ILSA Timișoara
- 1947 ILSA Timișoara (2)
- 1948 ILSA Timișoara (3)
- 1949 ILSA Timișoara (4)
- 1950 ILSA Timișoara (5)
- 1951 ILSA Timișoara (6)
- 1952 CCA București
- 1953 CCA București (2)
- 1954 CCA București (3)
- 1955 CCA București (4)
- 1956 CCA București (5)
- 1957 Dinamo București
- 1958 Dinamo București (2)
- 1959 Dinamo București (3)
- 1960 Dinamo București (4)
- 1961 Dinamo București (5)
- 1962 Dinamo București (6)
- 1963 Dinamo București (7)
- 1964 Dinamo București (8)
- 1965 Dinamo București (9)
- 1966 Dinamo București (10)
- 1967 Dinamo București (11)
- 1968 Dinamo București (12)
- 1969 Dinamo București (13)
- 1970 Dinamo București (14)
- 1971 Dinamo București (15)
- 1972 Rapid București (5)
- 1973 Dinamo București (16)
- 1974 Dinamo București (17)
- 1975 Rapid București (6)
- 1976 Rapid București (7)
- 1977 Rapid București (8)
- 1978 Dinamo București (18)
- 1979 Dinamo București (19)
- 1980 Dinamo București (20)
- 1981 Rapid București (9)
- 1982 Dinamo București (21)
- 1983 Dinamo București (22)
- 1984 Dinamo București (23)
- 1985 Crișul Oradea
- 1986 Crișul Oradea (2)
- 1987 Dinamo București (24)
- 1988 Dinamo București (25)
- 1989 Dinamo București (26)
- 1990 Dinamo București (27)
- 1990–91 Steaua București (6)
- 1991–92 Steaua București (7)
- 1992–93 Steaua București (8)
- 1993–94 Steaua București (9)
- 1994–95 Steaua București (10)
- 1995–96 Dinamo București (28)
- 1996–97 Dinamo București (29)
- 1997–98 Dinamo București (30)
- 1998–99 Dinamo București (31)
- 1999–00 Dinamo București (32)
- 2000–01 Rapid București (10)
- 2001–02 Rapid București (11)
- 2002–03 Rapid București (12)
- 2003–04 Rapid București (13)
- 2004–05 Steaua București (11)
- 2005–06 Steaua București (12)
- 2006–07 CSM Oradea
- 2007–08 CSM Oradea (2)
- 2008–09 CSM Oradea (3)
- 2009–10 CSM Oradea (4)
- 2010–11 CSM Oradea (5)
- 2011–12 CSM Oradea (6)
- 2012–13 CSM Oradea (7)
- 2013–14 CSM Oradea (8)
- 2014–15 CSM Oradea (9)
- 2015–16 Steaua București (13)
- 2016–17 Steaua București (14)
- 2017–18 Steaua București (15)
- 2018–19 Steaua București (16)
- 2019–20 Cancelled due to the COVID-19 pandemic
- 2020–21 Steaua București (17)
- 2021–22 Steaua București (18)
- 2022–23 Steaua București (19)
- 2023–24 Steaua București (20)
- 2024–25 CSM Oradea (10)
- 2025–26 Steaua București (21)

== Wins by club ==
Bold indicates clubs currently playing in 2020–21 season.

Club	Wins
**Dinamo București**	32
**Steaua București**	21
**Rapid București**	13
**CSM Oradea**	10
ILSA Timișoara	6
Universitatea Cluj	4
Târgu Mureș	3
**Crișul Oradea**	2
Viforul Dacia	2
AS Oradea	1
