= 2021–22 LEN Champions League Final Eight =

Water polo competition

Final Eight
- 2022

Tournament information
- Location: (Serbia) Belgrade
- Dates: 2–4 June 2022
- Teams: 8

Final positions
- Champion: (Italy) Pro Recco (10th title)
- Runner-up: (Serbia) Novi Beograd
- MVP: (Italy) Giacomo Cannella (Pro Recco)

The 2021–22 LEN Champions League Final Eight is the concluding LEN Champions League tournament of the 2021–22 LEN Champions League season.

== Venue ==
Belgrade	2021–22 LEN Champions League Final Eight (Serbia)
Sports Centre April 11th	2021–22 LEN Champions League Final Eight (Serbia)
Capacity: 2,500	2021–22 LEN Champions League Final Eight (Serbia)

== Qualified teams ==
Group	Winners	Runners-up	Third	Fourth
A	(Italy) AN Brescia	(Hungary) FTC Telekom	(Serbia) Novi Beograd	(Spain) Zodiac CNAB
B	(Italy) Pro Recco	(France) CN Marseille	(Croatia) Jug AO Dubrovnik	(Germany) Waspo 98 Hannover

== Schedule ==
LEN has determined the schedule of the Champions League Final Eight that will be held in Belgrade between June 2 and June 4.

== Bracket ==
Quarterfinals
2 June
(Italy) AN Brescia	12
(Germany) Waspo 98 Hannover	5
2 June
(France) CN Marseille	10
(Serbia) Novi Beograd	16
2 June
(Italy) Pro Recco	11
(Spain) Zodiac CNAB	10
2 June
(Hungary) FTC Telekom	14
(Croatia) Jug AO Dubrovnik	13

Semifinals
3 June
(Italy) AN Brescia	13
(Serbia) Novi Beograd	14
3 June
(Italy) Pro Recco	10
(Hungary) FTC Telekom	7

Final
4 June
(Serbia) Novi Beograd	16
(Italy) Pro Recco (PSO)	17
Third place game
4 June
(Italy) AN Brescia	12
(Hungary) FTC Telekom	14

5th–8th place bracket

5th–8th place semifinals
3 June
(Germany) Waspo 98 Hannover	11
(France) CN Marseille	9
3 June
(Spain) Zodiac CNAB	12
(Croatia) Jug AO Dubrovnik	9

Fifth place game
4 June
(Germany) Waspo 98 Hannover	10
(Spain) Zodiac CNAB	12
Seventh place game
4 June
(France) CN Marseille	15
(Croatia) Jug AO Dubrovnik	13

All times are local (UTC+2).

=== Quarterfinals ===
2 June 2022; 14:30	Report	AN Brescia (Italy)	12–5	(Germany) Waspo 98 Hannover	Belgrade; Referees: Michiel Zwart (NED); David Gómez (ESP)
2 June 2022; 14:30	Report	Score by quarters: 4–1, 3–1, 3–2, 2–1			Belgrade; Referees: Michiel Zwart (NED); David Gómez (ESP)
2 June 2022; 14:30	Report	Alesiani 3	Goals	D. Brguljan 2	Belgrade; Referees: Michiel Zwart (NED); David Gómez (ESP)

2 June 2022; 16:30	Report	Pro Recco (Italy)	11–10	(Spain) Zodiac CNA Barceloneta	Belgrade; Referees: Boris Margeta (SLO); Vojin Putniković (SRB)
2 June 2022; 16:30	Report	Score by quarters: 4–3, 1–3, 3–2, 3–2			Belgrade; Referees: Boris Margeta (SLO); Vojin Putniković (SRB)
2 June 2022; 16:30	Report	Ivović 3	Goals	Granados 4	Belgrade; Referees: Boris Margeta (SLO); Vojin Putniković (SRB)

2 June 2022; 18:30	Report	CN Marseille (France)	10–16	(Serbia) Novi Beograd	Belgrade; Referees: Georgios Stavridis (GRE); Tamás Kovács Csatlós (HUN)
2 June 2022; 18:30	Report	Score by quarters: 4–5, 2–4, 1–3, 3–4			Belgrade; Referees: Georgios Stavridis (GRE); Tamás Kovács Csatlós (HUN)
2 June 2022; 18:30	Report	Prlainović 5	Goals	Mandić 5	Belgrade; Referees: Georgios Stavridis (GRE); Tamás Kovács Csatlós (HUN)

2 June 2022; 20:30	Report	FTC Telekom (Hungary)	14–13	(Croatia) Jug AO Dubrovnik	Belgrade; Referees: Sebastien Dervieux (FRA); Adrian T. Alexandrescu (ROU)
2 June 2022; 20:30	Report	Score by quarters: 6–4, 3–4, 1–3, 4–2			Belgrade; Referees: Sebastien Dervieux (FRA); Adrian T. Alexandrescu (ROU)
2 June 2022; 20:30	Report	three players 3	Goals	Argyropoulos, Zuvela 3	Belgrade; Referees: Sebastien Dervieux (FRA); Adrian T. Alexandrescu (ROU)

=== 5th–8th place semifinals ===
3 June 2022; 14:30	Report	Waspo 98 Hannover (Germany)	11–9	(France) CN Marseille	Belgrade; Referees: Vojin Putniković (SRB); David Gómez (ESP)
3 June 2022; 14:30	Report	Score by quarters: 1–3, 2–1, 4–4, 4–1			Belgrade; Referees: Vojin Putniković (SRB); David Gómez (ESP)
3 June 2022; 14:30	Report	Muslim 6	Goals	Prlainović 3	Belgrade; Referees: Vojin Putniković (SRB); David Gómez (ESP)

3 June 2022; 16:30	Report	Zodiac CNA Barceloneta (Spain)	12–9	(Croatia) Jug AO Dubrovnik	Belgrade; Referees: Sebastien Dervieux (FRA); Frank Ohme (GER)
3 June 2022; 16:30	Report	Score by quarters: 4–2, 2–0, 3–4, 3–3			Belgrade; Referees: Sebastien Dervieux (FRA); Frank Ohme (GER)
3 June 2022; 16:30	Report	four players 2	Goals	Argyropoulos, Kakaris 3	Belgrade; Referees: Sebastien Dervieux (FRA); Frank Ohme (GER)

=== Semifinals ===
3 June 2022; 18:30	Report	AN Brescia (Italy)	13–14	(Serbia) Novi Beograd	Belgrade; Referees: Boris Margeta (SLO); Michiel Zwart (NED)
3 June 2022; 18:30	Report	Score by quarters: 4–3, 3–4, 3–2, 3–5			Belgrade; Referees: Boris Margeta (SLO); Michiel Zwart (NED)
3 June 2022; 18:30	Report	Di Somma 3	Goals	Vlachopoulos 5	Belgrade; Referees: Boris Margeta (SLO); Michiel Zwart (NED)

3 June 2022; 20:30	Report	Pro Recco (Italy)	10–7	(Hungary) FTC Telekom	Belgrade; Referees: Georgios Stavridis (GRE); Adrian T. Alexandrescu (ROU)
3 June 2022; 20:30	Report	Score by quarters: 1–2, 4–2, 4–1, 1–2			Belgrade; Referees: Georgios Stavridis (GRE); Adrian T. Alexandrescu (ROU)
3 June 2022; 20:30	Report	Hallock, Ivović 2	Goals	Merkulov, Vámos 2	Belgrade; Referees: Georgios Stavridis (GRE); Adrian T. Alexandrescu (ROU)

=== Seventh place game ===
4 June 2022; 12:00	Report	CN Marseille (France)	15–13	(Croatia) Jug AO Dubrovnik	Belgrade; Referees: Frank Ohme (GER); Tamás Kovács Csatlós (HUN)
4 June 2022; 12:00	Report	Score by quarters: 4–3, 2–4, 4–3, 5–3			Belgrade; Referees: Frank Ohme (GER); Tamás Kovács Csatlós (HUN)
4 June 2022; 12:00	Report	Vukičević 4	Goals	Kakaris 5	Belgrade; Referees: Frank Ohme (GER); Tamás Kovács Csatlós (HUN)

=== Fifth place game ===
4 June 2022; 14:00	Report	Waspo 98 Hannover (Germany)	10–12	(Spain) Zodiac CNA Barceloneta	Belgrade; Referees: Adrian T. Alexandrescu (ROU); Sebastien Dervieux (FRA)
4 June 2022; 14:00	Report	Score by quarters: 2–0, 2–3, 2–6, 4–3			Belgrade; Referees: Adrian T. Alexandrescu (ROU); Sebastien Dervieux (FRA)
4 June 2022; 14:00	Report	Nagaev 4	Goals	Bustos 4	Belgrade; Referees: Adrian T. Alexandrescu (ROU); Sebastien Dervieux (FRA)

=== Third place game ===
4 June 2022; 17:00	Report	AN Brescia (Italy)	12–14	(Hungary) FTC Telekom	Belgrade; Referees: Vojin Putniković (SRB); Michiel Zwart (NED)
4 June 2022; 17:00	Report	Score by quarters: 2–5, 4–2, 2–4, 4–3			Belgrade; Referees: Vojin Putniković (SRB); Michiel Zwart (NED)
4 June 2022; 17:00	Report	Dolce 4	Goals	Fekete 3	Belgrade; Referees: Vojin Putniković (SRB); Michiel Zwart (NED)

=== Final ===
4 June 2022; 19:30	Report	Novi Beograd (Serbia)	16–17	(Italy) Pro Recco	Belgrade; Referees: Boris Margeta (SLO); Georgios Stavridis (GRE)
4 June 2022; 19:30	Report	Score by quarters: 4–4, 2–1, 5–4, 2–4 PSO: 3–4			Belgrade; Referees: Boris Margeta (SLO); Georgios Stavridis (GRE)
4 June 2022; 19:30	Report	Jakšić 6	Goals	Zalánki 5	Belgrade; Referees: Boris Margeta (SLO); Georgios Stavridis (GRE)

2021–22 LEN Champions League
Champions

Pro Recco
10th title
