= CS Dinamo București (water polo) =

Romanian water polo club

Dinamo București
- Founded: 1949
- League: Romanian Superliga
- Based in: Bucharest
- Arena: Bazinul Anatolie Grinţescu
- Colors
- President: Cristian David
- Head coach: Andrei Iosep
- Championships: 32 Romanian Leagues
- Website: http://www.csdinamo.eu/polo

CS Dinamo București is a professional water polo club based in Bucharest, Romania.

== Honours ==
- Champions: 32 times
  - 1957, 1958, 1959, 1960, 1961, 1962, 1963, 1964, 1965, 1966, 1967, 1968, 1969, 1970, 1971, 1973, 1974, 1978, 1979, 1980, 1982, 1983, 1984, 1987, 1988, 1989, 1990, 1996, 1997, 1998, 1999, 2000
- LEN Champions League
  - 1968
  - 1975; 1988
  - 4 1967; 1973
- LEN Cup Winners' Cup
  - 1986
