= Bazinul Olimpic Ioan Alexandrescu =

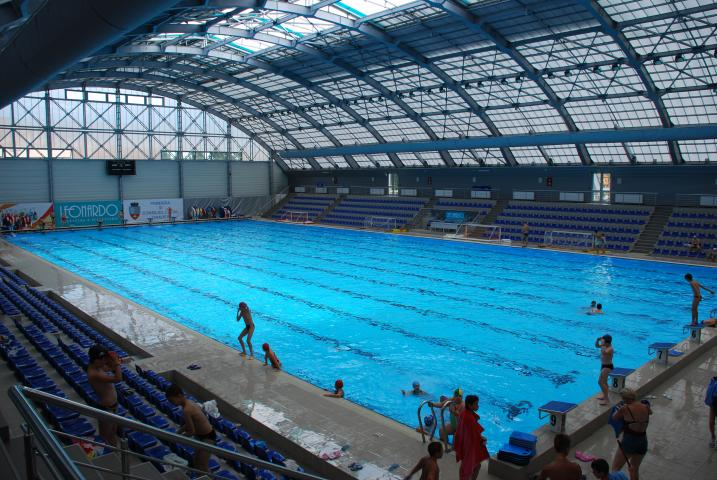
- Location: Oradea, Romania
- Owner: Oradea Municipality
- Operator: CSM Oradea
- Capacity: 1,035
- Surface: water

Construction
- Opened: 2007
- Renovated: 2013

Tenant
- CSM Digi Oradea (2007–present)

Bazinul Olimpic Ioan Alexandrescu is a water polo centre in Oradea, Romania and is the home ground of CSM Digi Oradea. The centre holds 1,035 people.
