= Krisztián Manhercz =

Hungarian water polo player

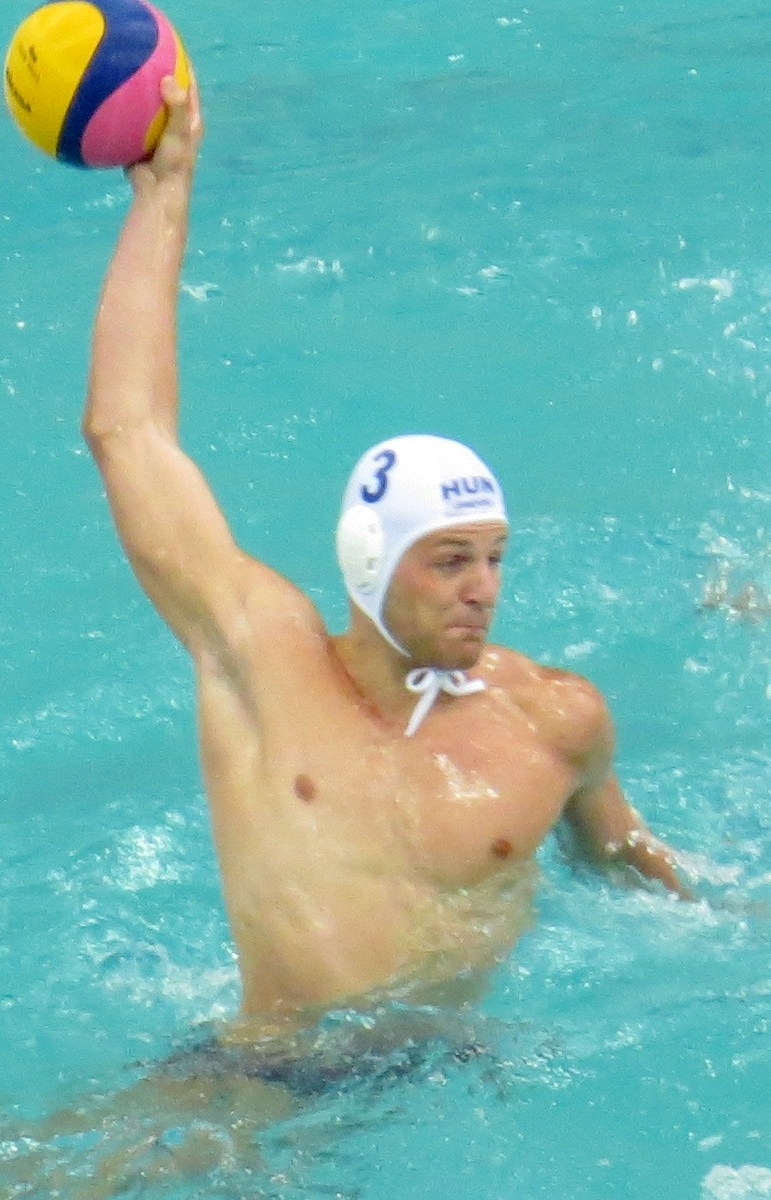
- Manhercz at the 2016 Summer Olympics

Personal information
- Full name: Krisztián Péter Manhercz
- Nationality: Hungarian
- Born: 6 February 1997 (age 29) Budapest, Hungary
- Height: 191 cm (6 ft 3 in)
- Weight: 91 kg (201 lb)

Sport
- Sport: Water polo
- Handedness: Right
- Position: Wing
- Current club: Marseille

Senior clubs
- Years: Team
- 2013–2014: Vasas
- 2014–2017: Szeged
- 2017–2018: Ferencváros
- 2018–2023: OSC-Újbuda
- 2023–present: Marseille
National team
| Years | Team | Apps | (Gls) |
| 2016– | Hungary | 197 | (235) |
Medal record
Men's water polo
Representing Hungary
Olympic Games
| Bronze medal – third place | 2020 Tokyo | Team |
World Championships
| Gold medal – first place | 2023 Fukuoka | Team |
| Silver medal – second place | 2017 Budapest | Team |
| Silver medal – second place | 2025 Singapore | Team |
European Championships
| Gold medal – first place | 2020 Budapest |
| Silver medal – second place | 2022 Split |
| Silver medal – second place | 2026 Belgrade |
| Bronze medal – third place | 2016 Belgrade |
FINA World League
| Silver medal – second place | 2018 Budapest |
FINA World Cup
| Gold medal – first place | 2018 Berlin |
| Silver medal – second place | 2026 Sydney |
- Updated on 1 August 2023

Krisztián Péter Manhercz (born 6 February 1997) is a Hungarian male water polo player, playing at the wing position. He is part of the Hungary men's national water polo team. He competed at the 2016 Men's European Water Polo Championship and 2016 Olympics. He won bronze at the 2020 Olympics.

== Honours ==
=== National ===
- World Championships: Gold medal - 2023
- European Championship: Silver medal - 2022
- European Championship: Gold medal - 2020
- World Championships: Silver medal – 2017
- European Championship: Bronze medal – 2016
- FINA Water Polo World League: Silver medal – 2018
- FINA World Cup: Gold medal – 2018
- Junior World Championship: (Bronze medal – 2015)
- Junior European Championship: (Silver medal – 2014)
- Youth World Championship: (Gold medal – 2014, Silver medal – 2012)

=== Club ===
- LEN Euro Cup Winner (1): (2018 – with Ferencváros)
- Hungarian Championship (OB I): 1x (2018 – with Ferencváros)

== Awards ==
- Szalay Iván díj (2013)
- All-Star Team of the Junior World Championship: 2014

== See also ==
- Hungary men's Olympic water polo team records and statistics
- List of World Aquatics Championships medalists in water polo
