= CSM Digi Oradea =

Romanian water polo club

- Founded: 2003
- League: Romanian Superliga
- Based in: Oradea
- Arena: Ioan Alexandrescu
- Colors: Red, Blue, White
- Owner: Oradea Municipality
- President: Șerban Sere
- Manager: Petar Kovacevic
- Championships: 10 Romanian Leagues
- Website: https://www.csmoradea.ro/

Clubul Sportiv Municipal Digi Oradea (often abbreviated as CSM Digi Oradea) is a Romanian water polo club from Oradea in Bihor County. As of 2022 it plays in Romanian Superliga, LEN Champions League and LEN Euro Cup.

== Titles ==
- Romanian Superliga
  - Winners (10): 2007, 2008, 2009, 2010, 2011, 2012, 2013, 2014, 2015, 2025
  - Runners-up (5): 2016, 2017, 2018, 2019, 2026
- Romanian Cup
  - Winners (3): 2012, 2013, 2016
  - Runners-up (4): 2017, 2018, 2019, 2025

== Team as of 2025 ==
- (Serbia) Lazar Dobozanov
- (Romania) Tiberiu Negrean
- (Romania) Nichita Ilisie
- (Romania) Luncan Darian
- (Serbia) Petar Velkic
- (Romania) Alex Popoviciu
- (Romania) Manuel Klutsch
- (Romania) Mihnea Gheorghe
- (Romania) Levente Vancsik
- (Romania) Czenk Ferenc
- (Romania) Raul Gavris
- (Romania) Adrian Pascaluta
- (Romania) István Szabó
- (Romania) Insinna Tomasso
- (Romania) Daniel Turculet
- (Romania) David Belenyesi
- (Russia) Ivan Gusarov

== Famous players ==
- (Romania) Kálmán Kádár
- (Romania) Gheorghe Dunca

== Famous coaches ==
- (Romania) Kalman Kadar
- (Romania) Gheorghe Dunca
- (Romania) Dorin Costrăş
- (Romania) Cornel Gordan
- (Romania) Ioan Alexandrescu
