= List of LEN Champions League winning players =

Player	Nationality	Clubs	Titles won	Years	Notes
Felipe Perrone	Spain	Pro Recco, Atlètic-Barceloneta	2	2012, 2014	
Nemanja Ubović	Serbia	Atlètic-Barceloneta	1	2014	
Mario Lloret	Spain	Atlètic-Barceloneta	1	2014	
Alberto Munárriz	Spain	Atlètic-Barceloneta	1	2014	
Gonzalo Echenique	Spain	Atlètic-Barceloneta	1	2014	
Joshua Monpeat	Spain	Atlètic-Barceloneta	1	2014	
Marko Petković	Serbia	Atlètic-Barceloneta	1	2014	
Albert Español	Spain	Atlètic-Barceloneta	1	2014	
Rubén de Lera	Spain	Atlètic-Barceloneta	1	2014	
Marc Roca	Spain	Atlètic-Barceloneta	1	2014	
Daniel López	Spain	Atlètic-Barceloneta	1	2014	
Francisco Fernández	Spain	Atlètic-Barceloneta	1	2014	
Balazs Sziranyi	Spain	Atlètic-Barceloneta	1	2014	
Marc Minguell	Spain	Atlètic-Barceloneta	1	2014	
Duško Pijetlović	Serbia	Partizan, Pro Recco, Crvena zvezda	3	2011, 2012, 2013	
Andrija Prlainović	Serbia	Partizan, Pro Recco, Crvena zvezda	3	2011, 2012, 2013	
Nikola Rađen	Serbia	Partizan, Crvena zvezda	2	2011, 2013	
Denis Šefik	Serbia	Crvena zvezda	1	2013	
Strahinja Rašović	Serbia	Crvena zvezda	1	2013	
Petar Ivošević	Serbia	Crvena zvezda	1	2013	
Mihajlo Milićević	Serbia	Crvena zvezda	1	2013	
Marko Avramović	Serbia	Crvena zvezda	1	2013	
Viktor Rašović	Serbia	Crvena zvezda	1	2013	
Sava Ranđelović	Serbia	Crvena zvezda	1	2013	
Boris Vapenski	Serbia	Crvena zvezda	1	2013	
Nenad Stojčić	Serbia	Crvena zvezda	1	2013	
Marko Draksimović	Serbia	Crvena zvezda	1	2013	
Tamás Kásás	Hungary	Posillipo, Pro Recco	5	1998, 2007, 2008, 2010, 2012	
Maurizio Felugo	Italy	Posillipo, Pro Recco	5	2005, 2007, 2008, 2010, 2012	
Stefano Tempesti	Italy	Pro Recco	4	2007, 2008, 2010, 2012	
Norbert Madaras	Hungary	Pro Recco	4	2007, 2008, 2010, 2012	
Boris Zloković	Montenegro	Posillipo, Pro Recco	2	2005, 2012	
Damir Burić	Croatia	Pro Recco	2	2010, 2012	
Filip Filipović	Serbia	Pro Recco	2	2010, 2012	
Guillermo Molina	Spain	Pro Recco	2	2010, 2012	
Sandro Sukno	Croatia	Pro Recco	1	2012	
Aleksandar Ivović	Montenegro	Pro Recco	1	2012	
Vladimir Vujasinović	Serbia	Pro Recco, Partizan	4	2003, 2007, 2008, 2011	
Slobodan Soro	Serbia	Bečej, Partizan	2	2000, 2011	
Theodoros Chatzitheodorou	Greece	Olympiacos, Partizan	2	2002, 2011	
Miloš Korolija	Serbia	Partizan	1	2011	
Milan Aleksić	Serbia	Partizan	1	2011	
Aleksandar Radović	Serbia	Partizan	1	2011	
Dušan Mandić	Serbia	Partizan	1	2011	
Stefan Mitrović	Serbia	Partizan	1	2011	
Miloš Ćuk	Serbia	Partizan	1	2011	
Nikola Dedović	Serbia	Partizan	1	2011	
Stefan Živojinović	Serbia	Partizan	1	2011	
Tibor Benedek	Hungary	Újpest, Pro Recco	4	1994, 2003, 2008, 2010	
Alessandro Calcaterra	Italy	Pro Recco	4	2003, 2007, 2008, 2010	
Andrea Mangiante	Italy	Pro Recco	3	2007, 2008, 2010	
Pietro Figlioli	Italy	Pro Recco	2	2007, 2010	
Vanja Udovičić	Serbia	Pro Recco	2	2008, 2010	
Slobodan Nikić	Serbia	Pro Recco	1	2010	
Gergely Kiss	Hungary	Posillipo, Honvéd, Primorac Kotor	3	1998, 2004, 2009	
Zdravko Radić	Montenegro	Primorac Kotor	1	2009	
Draško Brguljan	Montenegro	Primorac Kotor	1	2009	
Damir Crepulja	Montenegro	Primorac Kotor	1	2009	
Antonio Petrović	Montenegro	Primorac Kotor	1	2009	
Darko Brguljan	Montenegro	Primorac Kotor	1	2009	
Juraj Zatović	Montenegro	Primorac Kotor	1	2009	
Vjekoslav Pasković	Montenegro	Primorac Kotor	1	2009	
Boris Pavlović	Montenegro	Primorac Kotor	1	2009	
Bojan Milošević	Montenegro	Primorac Kotor	1	2009	
Ádám Steinmetz	Hungary	Primorac Kotor	1	2009	
Uroš Čučković	Montenegro	Primorac Kotor	1	2009	
Uglješa Brguljan	Montenegro	Primorac Kotor	1	2009	
Alberto Angelini	Italy	Pro Recco	3	2003, 2007, 2008	
Daniele Bettini	Italy	Pro Recco	2	2003, 2007	
Arnaldo Deserti	Italy	Pro Recco	2	2007, 2008	
Goran Fiorentini	Italy	Pro Recco	1	2007, 2008	
Massimo Giacoppo	Italy	Pro Recco	1	2008	
Leonardo Sottani	Italy	Pro Recco	1	2007	
Igor Računica	Croatia	Jug Dubrovnik	2	2001, 2006	
Ognjen Kržić	Croatia	Jug Dubrovnik	2	2001, 2006	
Mile Smodlaka	Croatia	Jug Dubrovnik	2	2001, 2006	
Elvis Fatović	Croatia	Jug Dubrovnik	2	2001, 2006	
Frano Karač	Croatia	Jug Dubrovnik	2	2001, 2006	
Goran Volarević	Croatia	Jug Dubrovnik	1	2006	
Andrija Komadina	Croatia	Jug Dubrovnik	1	2006	
Miho Bošković	Croatia	Jug Dubrovnik	1	2006	
Pavo Marković	Croatia	Jug Dubrovnik	1	2006	
Andro Bušlje	Croatia	Jug Dubrovnik	1	2006	
Maro Joković	Croatia	Jug Dubrovnik	1	2006	
Nikša Dobud	Croatia	Jug Dubrovnik	1	2006	
Nikša Drobac	Croatia	Jug Dubrovnik	1	2006	
Davor Car	Croatia	Jug Dubrovnik	1	2006	
Francesco Postiglione	Italy	Posillipo	3	1997, 1998, 2005	
Carlo Silipo	Italy	Posillipo	3	1997, 1998, 2005	
Fabio Bencivenga	Italy	Posillipo	3	1997, 1998, 2005	
Ratko Štritof	Croatia	HAVK Mladost, Posillipo	2	1996, 2005	
Fabio Violetti	Italy	Posillipo	1	2005	
Giancarlo Agrillo	Italy	Posillipo	1	2005	
Fabrizio Buonocore	Italy	Posillipo	1	2005	
Christos Afroudakis	Greece	Posillipo	1	2005	
Andrea Scotti Galletta	Italy	Posillipo	1	2005	
Valentino Gallo	Italy	Posillipo	1	2005	
Luigi Di Costanzo	Italy	Posillipo	1	2005	
Zoltán Kovács	Hungary	Újpest, Honvéd	2	1994, 2004	
István Gergely	Hungary	Honvéd	1	2004	
Olivér Kovács	Hungary	Honvéd	1	2004	
Miklós Bereczki	Hungary	Honvéd	1	2004	
Rajmund Fodor	Hungary	Honvéd	1	2004	
Attila Bárány	Hungary	Honvéd	1	2004	
Márton Szivós	Hungary	Honvéd	1	2004	
Tamás Molnár	Hungary	Honvéd	1	2004	
Attila Vári	Hungary	Honvéd	1	2004	
Viktor Paján	Hungary	Honvéd	1	2004	
Sándor Sugár	Hungary	Honvéd	1	2004	
Péter Biros	Hungary	Honvéd	1	2004	
Ottó Frikk	Hungary	Honvéd	1	2004	
Jesús Rollán	Spain	Catalunya, Pro Recco	2	1995, 2003	
Luca Giustolisi	Italy	Posillipo, Pro Recco	2	1998, 2003	
Danilo Ikodinović	Serbia and Montenegro	Pro Recco	1	2003	
Simone Mina	Italy	Pro Recco	1	2003	
Paolo Petronelli	Italy	Pro Recco	1	2003	
Massimiliano Ferretti	Italy	Pro Recco	1	2003	
Alessandro Caliogna	Italy	Pro Recco	1	2003	
Alberto Ghibellini	Italy	Pro Recco	1	2003	
Thomas Khatzis	Greece	Olympiacos	1	2002	
Nikolaos Deligiannis	Greece	Olympiacos	1	2002	
Alexandros Gianniotis	Greece	Olympiacos	1	2002	
Theodoros Kalakonas	Greece	Olympiacos	1	2002	
Dimitris Kravaritis	Greece	Olympiacos	1	2002	
Arsenis Maroulis	Greece	Olympiacos	1	2002	
Athanasios Platanitis	Greece	Olympiacos	1	2002	
Ilias Lappas	Greece	Olympiacos	1	2002	
Georgios Psykhos	Greece	Olympiacos	1	2002	
Ioannis Thomakos	Greece	Olympiacos	1	2002	
Petar Trbojević	Serbia and Montenegro	Olympiacos	1	2002	
Antonios Vlontakis	Greece	Olympiacos	1	2002	
Gerasimos Voltirakis	Greece	Olympiacos	1	2002	
Ivo Ivaniš	Croatia	HAVK Mladost, Jug Dubrovnik	2	1996, 2001	
Alen Bošković	Croatia	POŠK Split, Jug Dubrovnik	2	1999, 2001	
Maro Balić	Croatia	Jug Dubrovnik	1	2001	
Tihomil Vranješ	Croatia	Jug Dubrovnik	1	2001	
Đani Pecotić	Croatia	Jug Dubrovnik	1	2001	
Dragan Medan	Croatia	Jug Dubrovnik	1	2001	
Andrey Belofastov	Russia	Jug Dubrovnik	1	2001	
Pero Jovica	Croatia	Jug Dubrovnik	1	2001	
Goran Volarević	Croatia	Jug Dubrovnik	1	2001	
Balázs Vincze	Hungary	Újpest, Bečej	2	1994, 2000	
Aleksandar Šoštar	Serbia and Montenegro	Bečej	1	2000	
Predrag Zimonjić	Serbia and Montenegro	Bečej	1	2000	
Goran Krstonošić	Serbia and Montenegro	Bečej	1	2000	
Nenad Vukanić	Serbia and Montenegro	Bečej	1	2000	
Branko Peković	Serbia and Montenegro	Bečej	1	2000	
Aleksandar Ćirić	Serbia and Montenegro	Bečej	1	2000	
Veljko Uskoković	Serbia and Montenegro	Bečej	1	2000	
László Tóth	Hungary	Bečej	1	2000	
Aleksandar Šapić	Serbia and Montenegro	Bečej	1	2000	
Nebojša Milić	Serbia and Montenegro	Bečej	1	2000	
Nedeljko Rodić	Serbia and Montenegro	Bečej	1	2000	
István Mészáros	Hungary	Bečej	1	2000	
Nenad Kačar	Serbia and Montenegro	Bečej	1	2000	
Samir Barać	Croatia	POŠK Split	1	1999	
Srđan Bradarić	Croatia	POŠK Split	1	1999	
David Burburan	Croatia	POŠK Split	1	1999	
Teo Đogaš	Croatia	POŠK Split	1	1999	
Nikša Jaić	Croatia	POŠK Split	1	1999	
Ivan Katura	Croatia	POŠK Split	1	1999	
Aljoša Kunac	Croatia	POŠK Split	1	1999	
Vladimir Moćan	Croatia	POŠK Split	1	1999	
Dario Mužić	Croatia	POŠK Split	1	1999	
Mario Oreb	Croatia	POŠK Split	1	1999	
Dragan Rebić	Croatia	POŠK Split	1	1999	
Višeslav Sarić	Croatia	POŠK Split	1	1999	
Petar Trumbić	Croatia	POŠK Split	1	1999	
Aleksandar Nagy	Slovakia	POŠK Split	1	1999	
Roman Poláčik	Slovakia	POŠK Split	1	1999	
Milan Tadić	Serbia and Montenegro	Posillipo	2	1997, 1998	
Paolo Zizza	Italy	Posillipo	2	1997, 1998	
Dušan Popović	Serbia and Montenegro	Posillipo	2	1997, 1998	
Giuseppe Porzio	Italy	Posillipo	2	1997, 1998	
Gianfranco Salvati	Italy	Posillipo	2	1997, 1998	
Fabio Galasso	Italy	Posillipo	2	1997, 1998	
Francesco Porzio	Italy	Posillipo	2	1997, 1998	
Marcello De Georgio	Italy	Posillipo	1	1998	
Fulvio Di Martire	Italy	Posillipo	1	1998	
Bruno Antonino	Italy	Posillipo	1	1997	
Ferdinando Gandolfi	Italy	Posillipo	1	1997	
Piero Fiorentino	Italy	Posillipo	1	1997	
Siniša Školneković	Croatia	HAVK Mladost	1	1996	
Zdeslav Vrdoljak	Croatia	HAVK Mladost	1	1996	
Dario Kobeščak	Croatia	HAVK Mladost	1	1996	
Frano Vićan	Croatia	HAVK Mladost	1	1996	
Igor Bosnić	Croatia	HAVK Mladost	1	1996	
Vedran Jerković	Croatia	HAVK Mladost	1	1996	
Milorad Damjanić	Croatia	HAVK Mladost	1	1996	
Tino Vegar	Croatia	HAVK Mladost	1	1996	
Perica Bukić	Croatia	HAVK Mladost	1	1996	
Tomislav Rogin	Croatia	HAVK Mladost	1	1996	
Vjekoslav Kobešćak	Croatia	HAVK Mladost	1	1996	
Ante Huljev	Croatia	HAVK Mladost	1	1996	
Navarro	Spain	Catalunya	1	1995	
Sergi Pedrerol	Spain	Catalunya	1	1995	
Jordi Neira	Spain	Catalunya	1	1995	
Igor Milanović	Serbia and Montenegro	Catalunya	1	1995	
Igor Gočanin	Serbia and Montenegro	Catalunya	1	1995	
Jorge Payá	Spain	Catalunya	1	1995	
Pedro Francisco García	Spain	Catalunya	1	1995	
Josep Maria Abarca	Spain	Catalunya	1	1995	
Óscar Arévalo	Spain	Catalunya	1	1995	
Olle Martínez	Spain	Catalunya	1	1995	
Joaquim Serracanta	Spain	Catalunya	1	1995	
P. García	Spain	Catalunya	1	1995	
Csaba Mátéfalvy	Hungary	Újpest	1	1994	
Zoltán Rázga	Hungary	Újpest	1	1994	
András Gál	Hungary	Újpest	1	1994	
Tamás Dala	Hungary	Újpest	1	1994	
András Bene	Hungary	Újpest	1	1994	
Tamás Zantleitner	Hungary	Újpest	1	1994	
Zoltán Szabó	Hungary	Újpest	1	1994	
Zoltán Fazekas	Hungary	Újpest	1	1994	
Zsolt Vogel	Hungary	Újpest	1	1994	
Tamás Nitsovits	Hungary	Újpest	1	1994	

== See also ==
- LEN Champions League
- European Cup, Euroleague and LEN Champions League records and statistics
