= 1997–98 LEN Champions League =

Water polo sports season

- League: LEN Champions League
- Sport: Water Polo
- Duration: 1997 to 5 June 1998
- Number of teams: 8 (preliminary round)

Final Four
- Finals champions: (Italy) Posillipo (2nd title)
- Runners-up: (Italy) Pescara

Champions League seasons
- ← 1996–97 1998–99 →

The 1997–98 LEN Champions League was the 35th edition of LEN's premier competition for men's water polo clubs. It ran from 1997 to 6 June 1998, and it was contested by 16 teams. The Final Four (semifinals, final, and third place game) took place on June 5 and June 6 in Zagreb.

== Preliminary round ==
Location of teams of the 1997–98 LEN Champions League group stage.
Blue Group; Red Group.

Key to colors in group tables
Group winners and runners-up advanced to Final four

=== Blue Group ===
| Team | Pld | W | D | L | GF | GA | GD | Pts |
|---|---|---|---|---|---|---|---|---|
| (Croatia) HAVK Mladost | 6 | 4 | 0 | 2 | 46 | 40 | +6 | 8 |
| (Russia) Spartak Volgograd | 6 | 3 | 1 | 2 | 37 | 42 | −5 | 7 |
| (Federal Republic of Yugoslavia) Bečej | 6 | 3 | 0 | 3 | 51 | 44 | +7 | 6 |
| (Hungary) BVSC | 6 | 1 | 1 | 4 | 46 | 54 | −8 | 3 |

=== Red Group ===
| Team | Pld | W | D | L | GF | GA | GD | Pts |
|---|---|---|---|---|---|---|---|---|
| (Italy) Posillipo | 6 | 5 | 1 | 0 | 58 | 45 | +13 | 11 |
| (Italy) Pescara | 6 | 4 | 1 | 1 | 67 | 45 | +22 | 9 |
| (France) Olympic Nice | 6 | 1 | 0 | 5 | 46 | 68 | −22 | 2 |
| (Greece) Vouliagmeni | 6 | 1 | 0 | 5 | 43 | 56 | −13 | 2 |

== Final Four (Zagreb) ==
Semifinals; 5 June 1998
(Croatia) HAVK Mladost | 2
(Italy) Pescara | 4
(Italy) Posillipo | 11
(Russia) Spartak Volgograd | 5

Final; 6 June 1998
(Italy) Pescara | 6
(Italy) Posillipo | 8
Third place
(Croatia) HAVK Mladost | 11
(Russia) Spartak Volgograd | 9

=== Final standings ===
| | Team |
|---|---|
| | (Italy) Posillipo |
| Silver medal | (Italy) Pescara |
| Bronze medal | (Croatia) HAVK Mladost |
| | (Russia) Spartak Volgograd |

1997–98 Champions League
Champions
(Italy) Posillipo
2nd title

Milan Tadić, Marcello De Georgio, Tamás Kásás, Giuseppe Porzio, Francesco Postiglione, Gergely Kiss, Fabio Galasso, Francesco Porzio, Luca Giustolisi, Paolo Zizza, Dušan Popović, Gianfranco Salvati, Fulvio Di Martire, Carlo Silipo, Fabio Bencivenga, Antracite Lignano
Head coach
Paolo De Crescenzo

== See also ==
- 1997–98 LEN Cup Winners' Cup
- 1997–98 LEN Cup
