= 1996–97 LEN Champions League =

Water polo sports season

- League: LEN Champions League
- Sport: Water Polo
- Duration: 1996 to 5 April 1997
- Number of teams: 8 (preliminary round)

Final Four
- Finals champions: (Italy) Posillipo (1st title)
- Runners-up: (Croatia) Mladost

Champions League seasons
- ← 1996 1997–98 →

The 1996–97 LEN Champions League was the ongoing 34th edition of LEN's premier competition for men's water polo clubs. It ran from 1996 to 5 April 1997, and it was contested by 8 teams. The Final Four (semifinals, final, and third place game) took place on April 4 and April 5 in Naples.

== Preliminary round ==
Location of teams of the 1996–97 LEN Champions League group stage.
Blue Group; Red Group.

Key to colors in group tables
Group winners and runners-up advanced to Final four

=== Blue Group ===
Team	Pld	W	D	L	GF	GA	GD	Pts
(Croatia) HAVK Mladost	6	6	0	0	58	35	+23	12
(Spain) Barcelona	6	3	1	2	39	41	−2	7
(Hungary) BVSC	6	2	0	4	51	56	−5	4
(Slovakia) Nováky	6	0	1	5	44	60	−16	1

=== Red Group ===
Team	Pld	W	D	L	GF	GA	GD	Pts
(Italy) Posillipo	6	5	0	1	59	43	+16	10
(Federal Republic of Yugoslavia) Bečej	6	4	0	2	68	50	+18	8
(Greece) Olympiacos	6	1	1	4	43	62	−19	3
(Germany) Spandau 04	6	1	1	4	43	56	−13	3

== Final Four (Naples) ==
Semifinals; 4 April 1997
(Croatia) HAVK Mladost	6
(Federal Republic of Yugoslavia) Bečej	5
(Italy) Posillipo	8
(Spain) Barcelona	6

Final; 5 April 1997
(Croatia) HAVK Mladost	7
(Italy) Posillipo	10
Third place
(Federal Republic of Yugoslavia) Bečej	5
(Spain) Barcelona	7

=== Final standings ===
	Team
	(Italy) Posillipo
Silver medal	(Croatia) HAVK Mladost
Bronze medal	(Spain) Barcelona
	(Federal Republic of Yugoslavia) Bečej

1996-97 Champions League
Champions
(Italy) Posillipo
1st title

Milan Tadić, Paolo Zizza, Dušan Popović, Giuseppe Porzio, Francesco Postiglione, Gianfranco Salvati, Fabio Galasso, Francesco Porzio, Bruno Antonino, Ferdinando Gandolfi, Piero Fiorentino, Carlo Silipo, Fabio Bencivenga
Head coach
Paolo De Crescenzo

== See also ==
- 1996–97 LEN Cup Winners' Cup
- 1996–97 LEN Cup
