= 1999–2000 LEN Champions League =

- League: LEN Champions League
- Sport: Water Polo
- Duration: 27 October 1999 to 27 May 2000
- Number of teams: 8 (preliminary round); 28 (total)

Final Four
- Finals champions: (Federal Republic of Yugoslavia) Bečej (1st title)
- Runners-up: (Croatia) Mladost

Champions League seasons
- ← 1998–99 2000–01 →

The 1999–2000 LEN Champions League was the 37th edition of LEN's premier competition for men's water polo clubs. It ran from 27 October 1999 to 27 May 2000, and it was contested by 28 teams. The Final Four (semifinals, final, and third place game) took place on May 26 and May 27 in Bečej.

== Preliminary round ==
Location of teams of the 1999–00 LEN Champions League group stage.
Blue Group; Red Group.

Key to colors in group tables
Group winners and runners-up advanced to Final four

=== Blue Group ===
Team	Pld	W	D	L	GF	GA	GD	Pts
(Hungary) BVSC	6	3	3	0	41	34	+7	9
(Croatia) POŠK	6	4	1	1	51	37	+14	9
(Greece) Olympiacos	6	2	2	2	45	44	+1	6
(France) Olympic Nice	6	0	0	6	36	58	−22	0

=== Red Group ===
Team	Pld	W	D	L	GF	GA	GD	Pts
(Federal Republic of Yugoslavia) Bečej	6	5	1	0	61	34	+27	11
(Croatia) HAVK Mladost	6	3	0	3	40	39	+1	6
(Russia) Spartak Volgograd	6	2	0	4	40	53	−13	4
(Germany) Spandau 04	6	1	1	4	36	51	−15	3

== Final Four (Bečej) ==
Semifinals; 26 May 2000
(Hungary) BVSC	4
(Croatia) HAVK Mladost	6
(Federal Republic of Yugoslavia) Bečej	6
(Croatia) POŠK	4

Final; 27 May 2000
(Croatia) HAVK Mladost	8
(Federal Republic of Yugoslavia) Bečej	11
Third place
(Hungary) BVSC	13
(Croatia) POŠK	7

=== Final standings ===
	Team
	(Federal Republic of Yugoslavia) Bečej
Silver medal	(Croatia) HAVK Mladost
Bronze medal	(Hungary) BVSC
	(Croatia) POŠK

1999–2000 Champions League
Champions
(Federal Republic of Yugoslavia) Bečej
1st title

Aleksandar Šoštar, Predrag Zimonjić, Slobodan Soro, Goran Krstonošić, Nenad Vukanić, Branko Peković, Aleksandar Ćirić, Veljko Uskoković, László Tóth, Aleksandar Šapić, Jugoslav Vasović, Balázs Vincze, Nebojša Milić
Head coach
Zoltán Kásás

== See also ==
- 1999–00 LEN Cup Winners' Cup
- 1999–00 LEN Cup
