= 1998–99 LEN Champions League =

Water polo sports season

- League: LEN Champions League
- Sport: Water Polo
- Duration: 1998 to 5 June 1999
- Number of teams: 8 (preliminary round); 16 (Total)

Final Four
- Finals champions: (Croatia) Splitska Banka (1st title)
- Runners-up: (Federal Republic of Yugoslavia) Bečej

Champions League seasons
- ← 1997–98 1999–2000 →

The 1998–99 LEN Champions League was the 36th edition of LEN's premier competition for men's water polo clubs. It ran from 1998 to 5 June 1999, and it was contested by 16 teams. The Final Four (semifinals, final, and third place game) took place on June 4 and June 5 in Naples.

== Preliminary round ==
Location of teams of the 1998–99 LEN Champions League group stage.
Blue Group; Red Group.

Key to colors in group tables
Group winners and runners-up advanced to Final four

=== Blue Group ===
Team	Pld	W	D	L	GF	GA	GD	Pts
(Italy) Posillipo	6	4	0	2	49	43	+6	8
(Federal Republic of Yugoslavia) Bečej	6	3	1	2	56	51	+5	7
(Hungary) BVSC	6	2	1	3	46	44	+2	5
(Greece) Vouliagmeni	6	2	0	4	44	57	−13	4

=== Red Group ===
Team	Pld	W	D	L	GF	GA	GD	Pts
(Russia) Dynamo Moscow	6	5	0	1	52	38	+14	10
(Croatia) Splitska Banka	6	5	0	1	58	46	+12	10
(Spain) Catalunya	6	1	1	4	45	53	−8	3
(France) Olympic Nice	6	0	1	5	41	61	−20	1

== Final Four (Naples) ==
Semifinals; 4 June 1999
(Italy) Posillipo	6
(Croatia) Splitska Banka	7
(Russia) Dynamo Moscow	4
(Federal Republic of Yugoslavia) Bečej	8

Final; 5 June 1999
(Croatia) Splitska Banka	8
(Federal Republic of Yugoslavia) Bečej	7
Third place
(Italy) Posillipo	8
(Russia) Dynamo Moscow	9

=== Final standings ===
	Team
	(Croatia) Splitska Banka
Silver medal	(Federal Republic of Yugoslavia) Bečej
Bronze medal	(Russia) Dynamo Moscow
	(Italy) Posillipo

1998–99 Champions League
Champions
(Croatia) Splitska Banka
1st title

Dragan Rebić, Teo Đogaš, Petar Trumbić, Nikša Jaić, David Burburan, Roman Poláčik, Višeslav Sarić, Aleksandar Nagy, Samir Barać, Aljoša Kunac, Alen Bošković, Mario Oreb, Ivan Katura
Head coach
Dragan Matutinović

== See also ==
- 1998–99 LEN Cup Winners' Cup
- 1998–99 LEN Cup
