= 2000–01 LEN Champions League =

Water polo sports season

- League: LEN Champions League
- Sport: Water Polo
- Duration: 2000 to 19 May 2001
- Number of teams: 8 (preliminary round)

Final Four
- Finals champions: (Croatia) Jug Dubrovnik (2nd title)
- Runners-up: (Greece) Olympiacos

Champions League seasons
- ← 1999–00 2001–02 →

The 2000–01 LEN Champions League was the 38th edition of LEN's premier competition for men's water polo clubs. It ran from 2000 to 19 May 2001, and it was contested by 8 teams. The Final Four (semifinals, final, and third place game) took place on May 18 and May 19 in Dubrovnik.

== Preliminary round ==
Location of teams of the 2000–01 LEN Champions League group stage.
Blue Group; Red Group.

Key to colors in group tables
Group winners and runners-up advanced to Final four

=== Blue Group ===
| Team | Pld | W | D | L | GF | GA | GD | Pts |
|---|---|---|---|---|---|---|---|---|
| (Italy) Posillipo | 6 | 5 | 0 | 1 | 52 | 33 | +19 | 10 |
| (Croatia) Jug Dubrovnik | 6 | 4 | 1 | 1 | 59 | 39 | +20 | 9 |
| (Russia) Dynamo Moscow | 6 | 1 | 1 | 4 | 28 | 41 | −13 | 3 |
| (Germany) Spandau 04 | 6 | 1 | 0 | 5 | 33 | 59 | −26 | 2 |

=== Red Group ===
| Team | Pld | W | D | L | GF | GA | GD | Pts |
|---|---|---|---|---|---|---|---|---|
| (Federal Republic of Yugoslavia) Bečej | 6 | 6 | 0 | 0 | 62 | 41 | +21 | 12 |
| (Greece) Olympiacos | 6 | 3 | 0 | 3 | 46 | 44 | +2 | 6 |
| (Hungary) Ferencváros | 6 | 2 | 0 | 4 | 40 | 51 | −11 | 4 |
| (France) Olympic Nice | 6 | 1 | 0 | 5 | 43 | 55 | −12 | 2 |

== Final Four (Dubrovnik) ==
Bazen u Gružu, Dubrovnik, Croatia

Semifinals; 18 May 2001
(Italy) Posillipo | 6
(Greece) Olympiacos | 7
(Federal Republic of Yugoslavia) Bečej | 9
(Croatia) Jug Dubrovnik | 10

Final; 19 May 2001
(Greece) Olympiacos | 7
(Croatia) Jug Dubrovnik (aet) | 8
Third place
(Italy) Posillipo | 12
(Federal Republic of Yugoslavia) Bečej | 5

=== Final standings ===
| | Team |
|---|---|
| | (Croatia) Jug Dubrovnik |
| Silver medal | (Greece) Olympiacos |
| Bronze medal | (Italy) Posillipo |
| | (Federal Republic of Yugoslavia) Bečej |

2000–01 Champions League
Champions
(Croatia) Jug Dubrovnik
2nd title

Goran Volarević, Tihomil Vranješ, Đani Pecotić, Igor Računica, Ognjen Kržić, Mile Smodlaka, Dragan Medan, Ivo Ivaniš, Alen Bošković, Andrey Belofastov, Maro Balić, Elvis Fatović, Frano Karač
Head coach
Veselin Đuho

== See also ==
- 2000–01 LEN Cup Winners' Cup
- 2000–01 LEN Cup
