= Miho Bošković =

Croatian water polo player (born 1983)

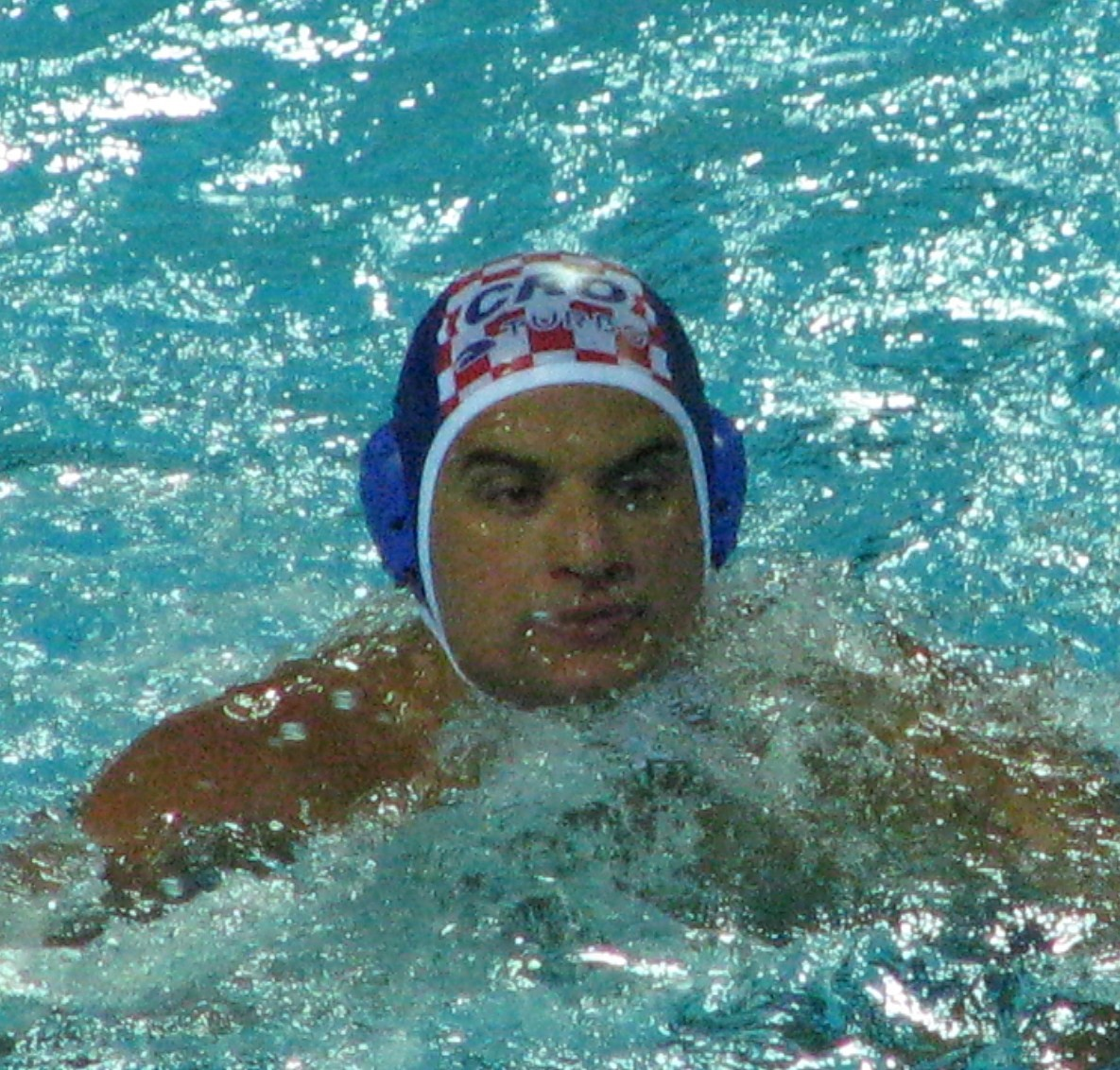

Personal information
- Full name: Miho Bošković
- Nationality: Croatian
- Born: 11 January 1983 (age 43) Dubrovnik, SR Croatia, SFR Yugoslavia
- Height: 1.97 m (6 ft 6 in)
- Weight: 96 kg (212 lb)

Sport
- Sport: Water polo
- Position: Forward

Senior clubs
- Years: Team
- 2001–2004: Jadran Split
- 2004–2010: Jug Dubrovnik
- 2010–2012: Vasas
- 2012–2015: Jug Dubrovnik
- 2015–2017: Primorje Rijeka
Medal record
Men's water polo
Representing Croatia
Olympic Games
Gold medal – first place	2012 London	Team
World Championship
Gold medal – first place	2007 Melbourne	Team
Bronze medal – third place	2009 Rome	Team
Bronze medal – third place	2011 Shanghai	Team
European Championship
Gold medal – first place	2010 Zagreb	Team
World Cup
Silver medal – second place	2010 Oradea	Team
FINA World League
Gold medal – first place	2012 Almaty	Team
Silver medal – second place	2009 Podgorica	Team
Bronze medal – third place	2010 Niš	Team
Bronze medal – third place	2011 Florence	Team

Miho Bošković (born 11 January 1983) is a Croatian professional water polo player. He was part of the Croatia national team, that won the gold medal at the 2012 Summer Olympics, as well as gold medals at the 2007 World Championship and 2010 European Championship, and bronze medals at the 2009 and 2011 World Championships.

Bošković plays for Vasas SC in the Hungarian Championship, at the position of the offensive player. He has played 108 matches for the national team., playing his first match in Montreal, at the 2005 World Championship.

With Jug, he won the 2005–06 LEN Champions League, LEN Super Cup, several national championships and cups. He was named the best European water polo player in 2007 and 2012, by LEN.

Scoring 369 goals, he has been the all-time top goalscorer for the senior Croatia national team.

== Honours ==
=== Club ===
Jug Dubrovnik

- LEN Champions League: 2005–06; runners-up: 2006–07, 2007–08, 2012–13
- LEN Super Cup: 2006
- Adriatic League: 2008–09
- Croatian Championship: 2003–04, 2004–05, 2005–06 2006–07, 2008–09, 2009–10, 2012–13, 2015–16
- Croatian Cup: 2005–06, 2006–07, 2007–08, 2008–09, 2009–10

Vasas

- Hungarian Championship: 2011–12

== Awards ==
- LEN "European Player of the Year" award: 2007, 2012
- Croatian Water Polo Player of the Year: 2007 with Jug Dubrovnik

== See also ==
- Croatia men's Olympic water polo team records and statistics
- List of Olympic champions in men's water polo
- List of Olympic medalists in water polo (men)
- List of world champions in men's water polo
- List of World Aquatics Championships medalists in water polo
