= 2002–03 LEN Champions League =

Water polo sports season

- League: LEN Champions League
- Sport: Water Polo
- Duration: 16 October 2002 to 17 May 2003
- Teams: 8 (preliminary round); 29 (total)

Final Four
- Finals champions: (Italy) Pro Recco (3rd title)
- Runners-up: (Hungary) Honvéd

Champions League seasons
- ← 2001–02 2003–04 →

The 2002–03 LEN Champions League was the 40th edition of LEN's premier competition for men's water polo clubs. It ran from 16 October 2002 to 17 May 2003, and it was contested by 29 teams. The Final Four (semifinals, final, and third place game) took place on May 16 and May 17 in Genoa.

== Preliminary round ==
Location of teams of the 2002–03 LEN Champions League group stage.
Blue Group; Red Group.

Key to colors in group tables
Group winners and runners-up advanced to Final four

=== Blue Group ===
| Team | Pld | W | D | L | GF | GA | GD | Pts |
|---|---|---|---|---|---|---|---|---|
| (Italy) Pro Recco | 6 | 5 | 0 | 1 | 59 | 47 | +12 | 10 |
| (Germany) Spandau 04 | 6 | 4 | 0 | 2 | 39 | 38 | +1 | 8 |
| (Spain) Barcelona | 6 | 2 | 1 | 3 | 44 | 44 | 0 | 5 |
| (Federal Republic of Yugoslavia) Partizan | 6 | 0 | 1 | 5 | 35 | 46 | −11 | 1 |

=== Red Group ===
| Team | Pld | W | D | L | GF | GA | GD | Pts |
|---|---|---|---|---|---|---|---|---|
| (Hungary) Honvéd | 6 | 5 | 1 | 0 | 58 | 44 | +14 | 11 |
| (Croatia) HAVK Mladost | 6 | 3 | 1 | 2 | 48 | 44 | +4 | 7 |
| (France) Olympic Nice | 6 | 1 | 2 | 3 | 38 | 43 | −5 | 4 |
| (Greece) Olympiacos | 6 | 0 | 2 | 4 | 33 | 46 | −13 | 2 |

== Final Four (Genoa) ==
Semifinals; 16 May 2003
(Italy) Pro Recco | 5
(Croatia) HAVK Mladost | 4
(Hungary) Honvéd | 11
(Germany) Spandau 04 | 6

Final; 17 May 2003
(Italy) Pro Recco | 9
(Hungary) Honvéd | 4
Third place
(Croatia) HAVK Mladost | 6
(Germany) Spandau 04 | 5

=== Final standings ===
| | Team |
|---|---|
| | (Italy) Pro Recco |
| Silver medal | (Hungary) Honvéd |
| Bronze medal | (Croatia) HAVK Mladost |
| | (Germany) Spandau 04 |

2002–03 Champions League
Champions
(Italy) Pro Recco
3rd title

Jesús Rollán, Alberto Angelini, Luca Giustolisi, Danilo Ikodinović, Simone Mina, Vladimir Vujasinović, Daniele Bettini, Tibor Benedek, Paolo Petronelli, Alessandro Calcaterra, Massimiliano Ferretti, Alessandro Caliogna, Alberto Ghibellini
Head coach
Marco Baldineti

== See also ==
- 2002–03 LEN Cup Winners' Cup
- 2002–03 LEN Cup
