= 2011–12 LEN Champions League =

Water polo sports season

- League: LEN Champions League
- Sport: Water Polo
- Duration: 6 September 2011 to 12 May 2012
- Number of teams: 16 (preliminary round); 26 (total)

Final Four
- Finals champions: (Italy) Pro Recco (7th title)
- Runners-up: (Croatia) Primorje
- Finals MVP: (Hungary) Denes Varga (Primorje Rijeka)

Champions League seasons
- ← 2010–11 2012–13 →

The 2011–12 LEN Champions League is the 49th edition of the Europe men's premier water polo competition. This also would become the first season with the new name of the LEN Champions League with the former name being called the Euroleague which had been the name of the competition since 2003.

29 teams competed in the edition with three quarters of those playing in qualifying as they joined the eight teams in the group stage. From there, the top two teams of each group qualified to the knockout stage with the final four round being played in Oradea. In the final, Pro Recco from Italy took out their seventh title defeating Croatian club, VK Primorje 11–8. Third place was fellow Croatian club HAVK Mladost who defeated Vasas SC from Hungary in the bronze medal playoff.

== Group stage ==
Key to colors in group tables
To progress to the Quarterfinal Round
To be eliminated

=== Group A ===
Pos	Team	Pld	W	D	L	GF	GA	GD	Pts
1	(Croatia) VK Primorje EB Rijeka	6	5	0	1	61	46	+15	15
2	(Montenegro) VK Budva M:Tel	6	3	0	3	46	55	−9	9
3	(Greece) Olympiacos Piraeus	6	2	0	4	50	48	+2	6
4	(Greece) Vouliagmeni NC	6	2	0	4	54	62	−8	6

Matchday One 22/23 Oct 2011
VK Primorje EB	12–8	Budva M:tel
Olympiacos Piraeus	9–8	Vouliagmeni NC
Matchday Two 9 Nov 2011
Vouliagmeni NC	8–10	VK Primorje EB
Budva M:tel	8–5	Olympiacos Piraeus
Matchday Three 26/27 Nov 2011
Olympiacos Piraeus	9–12	VK Primorje EB
Budva M:tel	8–9	Vouliagmeni NC
Matchday Four 14 Dec 2011
VK Primorje EB	6–5	Olympiacos Piraeus
Vouliagmeni NC	10–11	Budva M:tel
Matchday Five 8 Feb 2012
Olympiacos Piraeus	11–2	Budva M:tel
VK Primorje EB	13–7	Vouliagmeni NC
Matchday Six 25/26 Feb 2012
Vouliagmeni NC	12–11	Olympiacos Piraeus
Budva M:tel	11–10	VK Primorje EB

=== Group B ===
Pos	Team	Pld	W	D	L	GF	GA	GD	Pts
1	(Croatia) VK Jug CO Dubrovnik	6	6	0	0	62	41	+21	18
2	(Croatia) HAVK Mladost Zagreb	6	4	0	2	59	45	+14	12
3	(Germany) Spandau 04 Berlin	6	1	1	4	38	59	−21	4
4	(Serbia) VK Vojvodina Novi Sad	6	0	1	5	46	60	−14	1

Matchday One 22/23 Oct 2011
Spandau 04	8–9	VK Jug CO
HAVK Mladost	14–9	VK Vojvodina Novi Sad
Matchday Two 9 Nov 2011
VK Vojvodina Novi Sad	6–6	Spandau 04
VK Jug CO	10–8	HAVK Mladost
Matchday Three 26/27 Nov 2011
HAVK Mladost	11–6	Spandau 04
VK Jug CO	9–6	VK Vojvodina Novi Sad
Matchday Four 14 Dec 2011
Spandau 04	3–9	HAVK Mladost
VK Vojvodina Novi Sad	7–11	VK Jug CO
Matchday Five 8 Feb 2012
HAVK Mladost	6–7	VK Jug CO
Spandau 04	9–8	VK Vojvodina Novi Sad
Matchday Six 25/26 Feb 2012
VK Vojvodina Novi Sad	10–11	HAVK Mladost
VK Jug CO	16–6	Spandau 04

=== Group C ===
Pos	Team	Pld	W	D	L	GF	GA	GD	Pts
1	(Hungary) Szeged Beton VE	6	4	1	1	55	52	+3	13
2	(Hungary) TEVA Vasas Uniqa	6	3	2	1	60	54	+6	11
3	(Serbia) VK Partizan Raiffeisen	6	2	1	3	52	51	+1	7
4	(Hungary) ZF-Eger	6	1	0	5	44	54	−10	3

Matchday One 22/23 Oct 2011
VK Partizan Raiffeisen	8–9	Szeged Beton VE
ZF-Eger	5–8	TEVA-Vasas Uniqa
Matchday Two 9 Nov 2011
TEVA-Vasas Uniqa	10–10	VK Partizan Raiffeisen
Szeged Beton VE	6–3	ZF-Eger
Matchday Three 26/27 Nov 2011
VK Partizan Raiffeisen	9 – 6	ZF-Eger
TEVA-Vasas Uniqa	12 –9	Szeged Beton VE
Matchday Four 14 Dec 2011
ZF-Eger	12–8	VK Partizan Raiffeisen
Szeged Beton VE	12–12	TEVA-Vasas Uniqa
Matchday Five 8 Feb 2012
VK Partizan Raiffeisen	9–5	TEVA-Vasas Uniqa
ZF-Eger	9–10	Szeged Beton VE
Matchday Six 25/26 Feb 2012
Szeged Beton VE	9–8	VK Partizan Raiffeisen
TEVA-Vasas Uniqa	13–9	ZF-Eger

=== Group D ===
Pos	Team	Pld	W	D	L	GF	GA	GD	Pts
1	(Italy) Ferla Pro Recco	6	6	0	0	83	40	+43	18
2	(Montenegro) VK Jadran Herceg Novi	6	3	1	2	67	62	+5	10
3	(Russia) Spartak Volgograd	6	2	1	3	61	74	−13	7
4	(France) CN Marseille	6	0	0	6	50	72	−22	0

Matchday One 22/23 Oct 2011
Ferla Pro Recco	13–5	Spartak Volgograd
VK Jadran HN	13–7	CN Marseille
Matchday Two 9 Nov 2011
CN Marseille	4–13	Ferla Pro Recco
Spartak Volgograd	11–11	VK Jadran HN
Matchday Three 26/27 Nov 2011
Ferla Pro Recco	10–8	VK Jadran HN
CN Marseille	12–13	Spartak Volgograd
Matchday Four 14 Dec 2011
VK Jadran HN	9–14	Ferla Pro Recco
Spartak Volgograd	15–10	CN Marseille
Matchday Five 8 Feb 2012
Ferla Pro Recco	15–7	CN Marseille
VK Jadran HN	13–10	Spartak Volgograd
Matchday Six 25/26 Feb 2012
Spartak Volgograd	7–18	Ferla Pro Recco
CN Marseille	10–13	VK Jadran HN

== Quarterfinal round ==
Team 1	Agg.	Team 2	1st leg	2nd leg
VK Primorje EB Rijeka (Croatia)	23–22	(Montenegro) VK Jadran Herceg Novi	12–11	11–11
VK Budva M:Tel (Montenegro)	11–32	(Italy) Ferla Pro Recco	5–13	6–19
HAVK Mladost Zagreb (Croatia)	18–13	(Hungary) Szeged Beton VE	8–6	10–7
VK Jug CO Dubrovnik (Croatia)	21–24	(Hungary) TEVA Vasas Uniqa	12–8	9–16

== Final Four (Oradea) ==
Semifinals; 11 May 2012
(Italy) Pro Recco	12
(Hungary) Vasas	5
(Croatia) HAVK Mladost	6
(Croatia) Primorje	10

Final; 12 May 2012
(Italy) Pro Recco	11
(Croatia) Primorje	8
Third place
(Hungary) Vasas	7
(Croatia) HAVK Mladost	11

Semi-finals

11 May; 18:00	[ Report]	Pro Recco (Italy)	12–5	(Hungary) Vasas	Bazinul "Ion Alexandrescu", Oradea; Referees: Alexandrescu, Borrell
11 May; 18:00	[ Report]	Score by quarters: 4–1, 2–0, 4–2, 2–2			Bazinul "Ion Alexandrescu", Oradea; Referees: Alexandrescu, Borrell
11 May; 18:00	[ Report]	five players 2	Goals	five players 1	Bazinul "Ion Alexandrescu", Oradea; Referees: Alexandrescu, Borrell

11 May; 20:00	[ Report]	HAVK Mladost (Croatia)	6–10	(Croatia) Primorje	Bazinul "Ion Alexandrescu", Oradea; Referees: Margeta, Brguljan
11 May; 20:00	[ Report]	Score by quarters: 1–2, 2–2, 2–3, 3–4			Bazinul "Ion Alexandrescu", Oradea; Referees: Margeta, Brguljan
11 May; 20:00	[ Report]	six players 1	Goals	Dé. Varga, Jelača, Dá. Varga 2	Bazinul "Ion Alexandrescu", Oradea; Referees: Margeta, Brguljan

Third place

12 May 2012; 18:00	[ Report]	Vasas (Hungary)	7–11	(Croatia) HAVK Mladost	Bazinul "Ion Alexandrescu", Oradea; Referees: Margeta, Alexandrescu
12 May 2012; 18:00	[ Report]	Score by quarters: 1–1, 3–5, 1–2, 2–3			Bazinul "Ion Alexandrescu", Oradea; Referees: Margeta, Alexandrescu
12 May 2012; 18:00	[ Report]	Katonás, Vámos 2	Goals	four players 2	Bazinul "Ion Alexandrescu", Oradea; Referees: Margeta, Alexandrescu

Final

12 May 2012; 20:00	[ Report]	Pro Recco (Italy)	11–8	(Croatia) Primorje	Bazinul "Ion Alexandrescu", Oradea; Referees: Borrell, Brguljan
12 May 2012; 20:00	[ Report]	Score by quarters: 4–1, 2–3, 3–3, 2–1			Bazinul "Ion Alexandrescu", Oradea; Referees: Borrell, Brguljan
12 May 2012; 20:00	[ Report]	Ivović 3	Goals	Dé. Varga, Šetka, García 2	Bazinul "Ion Alexandrescu", Oradea; Referees: Borrell, Brguljan

2011–12 Champions League
Champions
(Italy) Pro Recco
7th title

Stefano Tempesti, Damir Burić, Norbert Madaras, Sandro Sukno, Tamás Kásás, Maurizio Felugo, Filip Filipović, Felipe Perrone, Duško Pijetlović, Boris Zloković, Aleksandar Ivović, Guillermo Molina, Andrija Prlainović
Head coach
Giuseppe Porzio

== Final standings ==
	Team
	(Italy) Pro Recco
Silver medal	(Croatia) Primorje
Bronze medal	(Croatia) HAVK Mladost
	(Hungary) Vasas

== Awards ==
Final four MVP
(Hungary) Denes Varga (Primorje Rijeka)
