= Boris Zloković =

Montenegrin retired water polo player

Personal information
- Born: 16 March 1983 (age 43) Kotor, SR Montenegro, SFR Yugoslavia
- Height: 1.98

Sport
- Sport: Water polo
- Handedness: Left
- Position: Driver

Senior clubs
- Years: Team
- 2004: PVK Jadran
- 2004–2009: Posillipo
- 2009–2010: PVK Jadran
- 2010–2012: Pro Recco
- 2012–2014: Radnički Kragujevac
- 2014–2016: PVK Jadran
Medal record
Men's water polo
Representing Serbia and Montenegro
World Championship
Gold medal – first place	2005 Montreal
Bronze medal – third place	2003 Barcelona
European Championship
Gold medal – first place	2003 Kranj
Representing Montenegro
European Championship
Gold medal – first place	2008 Malaga
Silver medal – second place	2012 Eindhoven
FINA World League
Gold medal – first place	2009 Podgorica
Silver medal – second place	2010 Niš

Boris Zloković (Montenegrin Cyrillic: Борис Злоковић; born 16 March 1983) is a Montenegrin retired water polo player.

He was a member of the Montenegro national team at the 2008 Summer Olympics. The team reached the semifinals, where they were defeated by Hungary and finished fourth at the end. He was also part of the team at the 2012 Summer Olympics, where Montenegro again finished 4th.

== Honours ==
=== Club ===
PVK Jadran

- Adriatic League: 2009–10
- Championship of Serbia & Montenegro: 2002–03, 2003–04
- Montenegrin Championship: 2014–15, 2015–16
- Montenegrin Cup: 2014–15, 2015–16

Possilipo

- LEN Champions League: 2004–05
- LEN Super Cup: 2005

Pro Recco

- LEN Champions League: 2011–12; runners-up: 2010–11
- LEN Super Cup: 2012
- Adriatic League: 2011 –12
- Serie A1: 2010–11, 2011–12
- Coppa Italia: 2010–11

Radnički Kragujevac

- LEN Euro Cup: 2012–13
- LEN Champions League runners-up: 2013–14

== See also ==
- List of world champions in men's water polo
- List of World Aquatics Championships medalists in water polo
