= 2009–10 LEN Euroleague =

Water polo sports season

- League: LEN Euroleague
- Sport: Water polo
- Duration: 9 October 2009 to 15 May 2010
- Teams: 16 (preliminary round); 34 (total)

Final Four
- Finals champions: (Italy) Pro Recco (6th title)
- Runners-up: (Montenegro) Primorac Kotor
- Finals MVP: (Serbia) Vanja Udovičić (Pro Recco)

Euroleague seasons
- ← 2008–09 2010–11 →

The 2009–10 LEN Euroleague was the 47th edition of Europe's premier club water polo competition. It lasted between 9 October 2009 and 15 May 2010.

== Format ==
The Euroleague is run in five phases:

- First qualifying round, played as a single round robin tournament at the site of one of the teams competing (2 groups of 4, 2 groups of 5)
- Second qualifying round, played as a single round robin tournament at the site of one of the teams competing (4 groups of 4)
- Group (or preliminary) stage, played as a double round robin, home and away (4 groups of 4)
- Quarterfinals, played as a knockout round on aggregate, home and away
- Final four, played as a single knockout tournament at a neutral site (semifinals, third-place game, and final)

== Seeding ==
Seeded countries

The eight countries with the best placed team in the preliminary rounds, or main group stage, in the previous year's competition, 2008–09 LEN Euroleague are seeded for this year's competition. Each seeded country earns 1 place in the main group stage, 1 place in the second qualifying round, and 1 place in the first qualifying round. These countries are:

Rank	Country	Best team in the group stages of 2008–09 LEN Euroleague	Place in the group stages of 2008–09 LEN Euroleague
1.	Greece	Olympiacos	Group C winner, 16 points
1.	Serbia	VK Partizan	Group D winner, 16 points
3.	Italy	Pro Recco	Group A winner, 12 points
4.	Montenegro	PVK Jadran	Group B winner, 11 points
5.	Hungary	Vasas SC	Second place Group D, 12 points
6.	Croatia	HAVK Mladost	Second place Group B, 10 points
7.	Russia	Spartak Volgograd	Third place Group A, 9 points
8.	Spain	CN Atlètic Barceloneta	Fourth place Group B, 5 points
9.	France	Cercle des Nageurs de Marseille	Fourth place Group D, 2 points

Unseeded countries

All other countries were invited to enter up to two clubs into the first qualifying round.

== Entries ==
First qualifying round (18)	How qualified
(Germany) Amateur Schwimm Club Duisburg	Playoff finalist, German Bundesliga 2008/09
(Slovenia) AŠD Vaterpolo Koper Rokava	Slovenian Champions 2008/09 (?)
(Italy) Brixia Leonessa Nuoto SSD A R.L.	3rd place playoff winner, Serie A1 2008/09
(France) Cercle des Nageurs de Marseille	Winner, final four playoff, Championnat de France Elite 2008/09
(Slovakia) ČH Hornets Košice	Slovakian Champions 2008/09 (?)
(Romania) CSM Frigoconti Oradea	Romanian Super League Champions 2008/09
(Turkey) Galatasaray Men's Water Polo Team	Turkish Premier League Champions 2008/09
(Poland) LSTW Lodz	Winner Polish Championship 2009
(France) Olympic Nice Natation	Runner-up, final four playoff, Championnat de France Elite 2008/09
(Portugal) Portinado	Portuguese Cup Champions 2009
(North Macedonia) PVK Rabotnicki - Skopje	Macedonian Champions 2008/09 (?)
(Russia) Sintez Kazan	3rd place, Russian League 2008/09 (?)
(Hungary) T-Mobile Honvéd	3rd place playoff winner, Hungarian Championship 2008/09
(Serbia) Vaterpolo Club Niš	3rd place playoff winner (?) Serbian Championship 2008/09
(Croatia) Vaterpolo Klub Šibenik	3rd place playoff winner (?) Croatian First Division 2008/09
(Greece) Vouliagmeni Nautical Club	3rd place, Greek Division A1 (?) 2008/09
(Austria) Wasserball Club Tirol	Austrian Bundesliga Champions 2009
(Germany) Wasserfreunde Spandau	Playoff winners, German Bundesliga 2008/09

Second qualifying round (8)	How qualified
(Italy) A.S.D. Circolo Nautico Posillipo	Playoff finalist, Serie A1 2008/09
(Croatia) Havk Mladost	Playoff finalist (?) Croatian First Division 2008/09
(Greece) Panionios G.S.S. Athens	Runner-up, Greek Division A1 (?) 2008/09
(Russia) Spartak City Volgograd	Runner-up, Russian League 2008/09 (?)
(Montenegro) Vaterpolo Klub Budva - M:TEL	Playoff finalist, Montenegrin League 2009
(Montenegro) VK Primorac Kotor	3rd place playoff winners, Montenegrin League 2009
(Serbia) VK Vojvodina Novi Sad	Playoff finalist (?) Serbian Championship 2008/09
(Hungary) ZF Eger	Playoff finalist, Hungarian Championship 2008/09

Group stage (8)	How qualified
(Italy) A.S.D. Pro Recco	Playoff winners, Serie A1 2008/09
(Russia) Aquatic Sport Club Shturm 2002	Champions, Russian League 2008/09 (?)
(Spain) Club Natació Atlètic Barceloneta	Playoff winners, Spanish Premier Division 2008/09
Jug Croatia Osiguranje	Playoff winners (?) Croatian First Division 2008/09
(Greece) Olympiacos	Champions, Greek Division A1 (?) 2008/09
(Montenegro) SWC Jadran CBK - Herceg Novi	Playoff winners, Montenegrin League 2009
(Hungary) Teva - Vasasplaket Budapest	Playoff winners, Hungarian Championship 2008/09
(Serbia) WPC Partizan Raiffeisen	Playoff winners (?) Serbian Championship 2008/09

== First qualifying round ==
Key to colors in group tables
Progress to the 2nd Qualifying Round
Progress to the LEN Cup 2nd Qualifying Round

=== Group A (Šibenik) ===
Pos	Team	Pld	W	D	L	GF	GA	GD	Pts
1	(Russia) Sintez Kazan	3	2	1	0	38	20	+18	7
2	(Croatia) VK Šibenik	3	2	1	0	35	24	+11	7
3	(France) Olympique Nice	3	1	0	2	32	42	−10	3
4	(Poland) LSTW Lodz	3	0	0	3	23	42	−19	0

=== Group B (Marseille) ===
Pos	Team	Pld	W	D	L	GF	GA	GD	Pts
1	(Hungary) Budapest Honved	3	3	0	0	45	20	+25	9
2	(France) Cercle des Nageurs de Marseille	3	2	0	1	36	28	+8	6
3	(Germany) ASC Duisburg	3	1	0	2	40	34	+6	3
4	(Austria) WC Tirol	3	0	0	3	18	57	−39	0

=== Group C (Berlin) ===
Pos	Team	Pld	W	D	L	GF	GA	GD	Pts
1	(Italy) Brixia Leonessa Nuoto	4	4	0	0	55	29	+26	12
2	(Germany) Wasserfreunde Spandau 04	4	3	0	1	59	24	+35	9
3	(Romania) CSM Oradea	4	2	0	2	59	35	+24	6
4	(Slovenia) ASDVC Koper Rokava	4	1	0	3	40	44	−4	3
5	(North Macedonia) Rabotnički Skopje	4	0	0	4	12	93	−81	0

=== Group D (Košice) ===
Pos	Team	Pld	W	D	L	GF	GA	GD	Pts
1	(Slovakia) CH Hornets Košice	4	4	0	0	51	24	+27	12
2	(Greece) Vouliagmeni NC	4	3	0	1	54	23	+31	9
3	(Turkey) Galatasaray Istanbul	4	2	0	2	45	34	+11	6
4	(Serbia) VK Niš	4	1	0	3	35	36	−1	3
5	(Portugal) Portinado	4	0	0	4	11	79	−68	0

== Second qualifying round ==
Key to colors in group tables
Progress to the Group Stage
Progress to the LEN Cup 2nd Qualifying Round

=== Group E (Eger) ===
Pos	Team	Pld	W	D	L	GF	GA	GD	Pts
1	(Hungary) ZF Eger	3	3	0	0	22	9	+13	9
2	(Greece) Panionios	3	1	1	1	28	27	+1	4
3	(Croatia) VK Šibenik	3	1	1	1	31	34	−3	4
4	(Italy) Brixia Leonessa Nuoto	3	0	0	3	23	30	−7	0

=== Group F (Budva) ===
Pos	Team	Pld	W	D	L	GF	GA	GD	Pts
1	(Croatia) Mladost Zagreb	3	2	1	0	34	24	+10	7
2	(Montenegro) Budvanska Rivijera	3	2	1	0	24	17	+7	7
3	(Germany) WF Spandau 04	3	1	0	2	18	26	−8	3
4	(Slovakia) Hornets Košice	3	0	0	3	19	28	−9	0

=== Group G (Naples) ===
Pos	Team	Pld	W	D	L	GF	GA	GD	Pts
1	(Montenegro) Primorac Kotor	3	3	0	0	41	19	+22	9
2	(Russia) Sintez Kazan	3	2	0	1	26	25	+1	6
3	(Italy) CN Posillipo Naples	3	1	0	2	19	26	−7	3
4	(France) CN Marseille	3	0	0	3	18	24	−6	0

=== Group G (Athens) ===
Pos	Team	Pld	W	D	L	GF	GA	GD	Pts
1	(Hungary) Budapest Honved	3	2	1	0	21	18	+3	7
2	(Serbia) Vojvodina Novi Sad	3	2	1	0	27	25	+2	7
3	(Russia) Spartak Volgograd	3	0	2	1	23	24	−1	2
4	(Greece) Vouliagmeni NC	3	0	1	2	20	24	−4	1

== Preliminary round ==
Location of teams of the 2009–10 LEN Euroleague group stage.
Red: Group A; Green: Group B; Blue: Group C; Yellow: Group D.

Key to colors in group tables
Group winners and runners-up advanced to the Quarter-finals

=== Group A ===
Team	Pld	W	D	L	GF	GA	GD	Pts
(Spain) Atlètic-Barceloneta	6	4	1	1	60	53	+7	13
(Montenegro) Jadran Herceg Novi	6	4	0	2	55	42	+13	12
(Croatia) HAVK Mladost	6	1	2	3	45	46	−1	5
(Serbia) Vojvodina	6	1	1	4	44	63	−19	4

=== Group B ===
Team	Pld	W	D	L	GF	GA	GD	Pts
(Montenegro) Primorac Kotor	6	5	1	0	62	48	+14	16
(Croatia) Jug Dubrovnik	6	2	2	2	60	57	+3	8
(Hungary) Vasas	6	2	1	3	58	54	+4	7
(Greece) Panionios	6	1	0	5	47	68	−21	3

=== Group C ===
Team	Pld	W	D	L	GF	GA	GD	Pts
(Serbia) Partizan	6	6	0	0	60	34	+26	18
(Montenegro) Budva	6	3	0	3	48	52	−4	9
(Greece) Olympiacos	6	2	0	4	51	51	0	6
(Hungary) Honvéd	6	1	0	5	43	65	−22	3

=== Group D ===
Team	Pld	W	D	L	GF	GA	GD	Pts
(Italy) Pro Recco	6	5	1	0	68	43	+25	16
(Hungary) Eger	6	2	2	2	47	47	0	8
(Russia) Sintez Kazan	6	2	0	4	45	55	−10	6
(Russia) Šturm 2002	6	1	1	4	39	54	−15	4

== Knockout stage ==
=== Quarter-finals ===
The first legs were played on 24 March, and the second legs were played on 14 April 2010.

Team 1	Agg.	Team 2	1st leg	2nd leg
Atlètic-Barceloneta (Spain)	16–19	(Croatia) Jug Dubrovnik	7–9	9–10
Eger (Hungary)	9–22	(Serbia) Partizan	4–12	5–10
Jadran Herceg Novi (Montenegro)	15–24	(Montenegro) Primorac Kotor	9–14	6–10
Pro Recco (Italy)	21–15	(Montenegro) Budva	9–5	12–10

=== Final Four (Naples) ===
Semifinals; 14 May 2010
(Italy) Pro Recco (aet)	8
(Serbia) Partizan	7
(Montenegro) Primorac Kotor	11
(Croatia) Jug Dubrovnik	10

Final; 15 May 2010
(Italy) Pro Recco	9
(Montenegro) Primorac Kotor	3
Third place
(Serbia) Partizan (pen)	16
(Croatia) Jug Dubrovnik	15

==== Final standings ====
	Team
	(Italy) Pro Recco
Silver medal	(Montenegro) Primorac Kotor
Bronze medal	(Serbia) Partizan
	(Croatia) Jug Dubrovnik

2009–10 Euroleague
Champions

6th title

Stefano Tempesti, Damir Burić, Norbert Madaras, Andrea Mangiante, Tamás Kásás, Maurizio Felugo, Filip Filipović, Pietro Figlioli, Tibor Benedek, Alessandro Calcaterra, Vanja Udovičić, Guillermo Molina, Slobodan Nikić
Head coach
Giuseppe Porzio

=== Awards ===
Final four MVP
(Serbia) Vanja Udovičić (Pro Recco)
