= Elvis Fatović =

Croatian water polo player

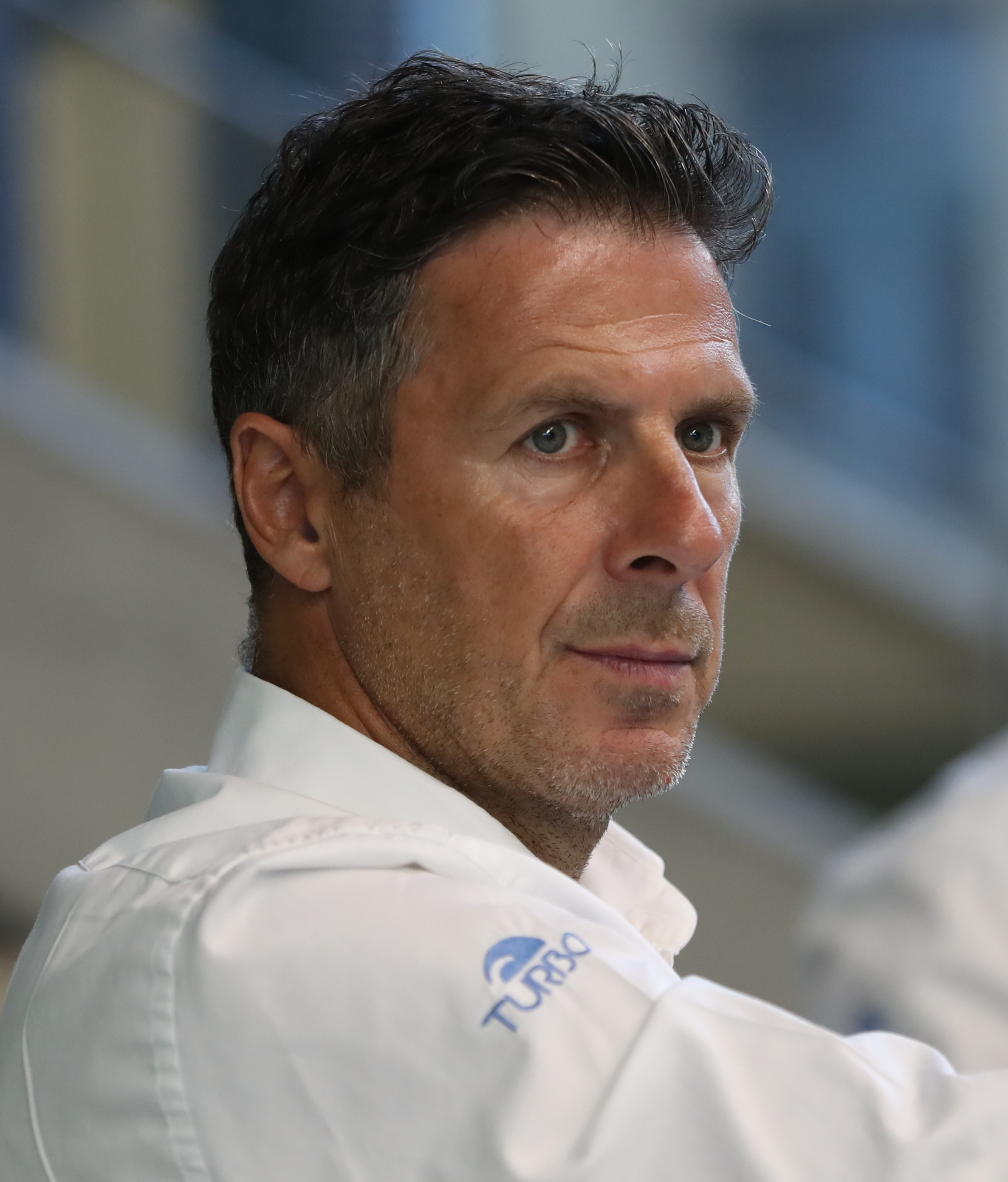

Personal information
- Full name: Elvis Fatović
- Nationality: Croatian
- Born: 8 May 1971 (age 55) Dubrovnik, SR Croatia, SFR Yugoslavia

Sport
- Sport: Water polo

Teams coached
- Years: Team
- 2005–2012: Croatia (assistant)
- 2008–2011: Jug
- 2013– 2021: Australia men's
- –: Club Natació Atlètic-Barceloneta, Barceloneta

Elvis Fatović (born 8 May 1971) is a Croatian professional water polo coach and former player. He is currently the head coach of the Club Natació Atlètic-Barceloneta senior men's team.

His son Loren is a professional water polo player.

== Playing career ==
In his rich career he played for Jug and Mladost.

He was left offensive player. His career started in famous Jug from Dubrovnik, but in 1992, he signed for biggest rival Mladost from the Croatian capital, Zagreb, with whom he won the Croatian Championship and Cup in 1993, after that he returned to hometown club Jug and continued his marvelous career.

With Jug he won five Croatian Championships and six Cups. Two times he led Jug in winning LEN Champions League in 2001 and in 2006, while in 2000 he also won LEN Europa Cup. For the Croatia national team, Fatović played 128 times and won silver medal in the 2003 European Championship in Kranj.

As a player, he competed at two Olympic games, Sydney Olympic Games in 2000 and Athens Summer Olympic Games in 2004.

Playing with the junior Yugoslavia national team he also won two decorations, the 1989 World Championship gold medal and the 1990 European Championship gold medal.

== Coaching career ==
Ending his playing career in 2007, he then became a senior team head coach in his beloved Jug until the end of year 2011, winning two Croatian Cups, Adriatic Water Polo League in the 2008–09 season and the Croatian Championship in 2008–09, 2009–10 and 2010–11 seasons.

In March 2013, he became the head coach of Men's Australian Water Polo team that he led to two Olympic games, in Rio 2016 and Tokyo 2020. Some of the historical wins throughout the 8 years tenure with Australia were the wins against the water polo powerhouses such as Croatia, Hungary, Greece, Montenegro and Spain.

He led the team to win 2nd place in World Cup in 2018 where they beat Croatia in quarter finals. They also placed 3rd in World League in 2019 when they beat Spain in the game for third place.

In May 2021, it was announced that he will leave his position as head coach of Australian men's water polo team in Australia and pursue an opportunity in Europe. In June 2021, it was announced that he is the new head coach of Club Natació Atlètic-Barceloneta, starting from 2021/22 season. In his first two months with the new team, the club won Spanish Cup and Cup De Catalonya.
