= 2007–08 LEN Euroleague =

Water polo sports season

- League: LEN Euroleague
- Sport: Water Polo
- Duration: 26 September 2007 to 10 May 2008
- Number of teams: 16 (preliminary round); 42 (total)

Final Four
- Finals champions: (Italy) Pro Recco (5th title)
- Runners-up: (Croatia) Jug Dubrovnik

Euroleague seasons
- ← 2006–07 2008–09 →

The 2007–08 LEN Euroleague was the 45th edition of LEN's premier competition for men's water polo clubs. It ran from 26 September 2007 to 10 May 2008, and was contested by 42 teams. The Final Four (semifinals, final, and third place game) took place on May 9 and May 10 in Barcelona. The winning team was Pro Recco from Italy.

== Qualifying round 1 ==
=== Group A (Istanbul) ===
Team	Pld	W	D	L	GF	GA	GD	Pts
(Montenegro) VK Primorac Kotor	6	6	0	0	95	26	+69	18
(Russia) Lukoil Spartak Volgograd	6	5	0	1	67	40	+27	15
(Greece) N.C. Chios	6	4	0	2	62	46	+16	12
(Slovakia) CH Hornets Košice	6	3	0	3	51	49	+2	9
(Netherlands) PSV Eindhoven	6	1	1	4	54	68	−14	4
(Turkey) Yuzme Istanbul	6	1	1	4	49	71	−22	4
(Switzerland) Lugano Pallanouto	6	0	0	6	25	103	−78	0

== Preliminary round ==
Location of teams of the 2007–08 LEN Euroleague group stage.
Red: Group A; Green: Group B; Blue: Group C; Yellow: Group D.

Key to colors in group tables
Group winners and runners-up advanced to the Quarter-finals

=== Group A ===
Team	Pld	W	D	L	GF	GA	GD	Pts
(Greece) Olympiacos	6	4	1	1	54	47	+7	13
(Croatia) HAVK Mladost	6	4	0	2	54	42	+12	12
(Russia) Sintez Kazan	6	2	1	3	52	50	+2	7
(Montenegro) Jadran Herceg Novi	6	1	0	5	45	66	−21	3

=== Group B ===
Team	Pld	W	D	L	GF	GA	GD	Pts
(Italy) Pro Recco	6	5	0	1	78	49	+29	15
(Montenegro) Primorac Kotor	6	3	1	2	52	55	−3	10
(Russia) Spartak Volgograd	6	2	1	3	55	66	−11	7
(France) Marseille	6	1	0	5	57	72	−15	3

=== Group C ===
Team	Pld	W	D	L	GF	GA	GD	Pts
(Hungary) Vasas	6	4	1	1	55	45	+10	13
(Croatia) Jug Dubrovnik	6	4	0	2	57	50	+7	12
(Hungary) Honvéd	6	3	1	2	50	46	+4	10
(Greece) Ethnikos Piraeus	6	0	0	6	44	65	−21	0

=== Group D ===
Team	Pld	W	D	L	GF	GA	GD	Pts
(Serbia) Partizan	6	5	0	1	61	42	+19	15
(Italy) Posillipo	6	3	1	2	62	57	+5	10
(Italy) Brixia Leonessa	6	2	0	4	51	60	−9	6
(Spain) Atlètic-Barceloneta	6	1	1	4	50	65	−15	4

== Knockout stage ==
=== Quarter-finals ===
The first legs were played on 26 March, and the second legs were played on 9 April 2008.

Team 1	Agg.	Team 2	1st leg	2nd leg
Jug Dubrovnik (Croatia)	18–17	(Greece) Olympiacos	10–5	8–12
Partizan (Serbia)	19–22	(Croatia) HAVK Mladost	9–9	10–13 (p)
Primorac Kotor (Montenegro)	13–14	(Hungary) Vasas	6–8	7–6
Pro Recco (Italy)	25–18	(Italy) Posillipo	13–10	12–8

=== Final Four (Barcelona) ===
Piscina Municipal de Montjuïc, Barcelona, Spain

Semifinals; 9 May 2008
(Croatia) HAVK Mladost	6
(Italy) Pro Recco	9
(Hungary) Vasas	6
(Croatia) Jug Dubrovnik	11

Final; 10 May 2008
(Italy) Pro Recco (aet)	13
(Croatia) Jug Dubrovnik	12
Third place
(Croatia) HAVK Mladost	6
(Hungary) Vasas	8

==== Final standings ====
	Team
	(Italy) Pro Recco
Silver medal	(Croatia) Jug Dubrovnik
Bronze medal	(Hungary) Vasas
	(Croatia) HAVK Mladost

2007-08 Euroleague
Champions
(Italy) Pro Recco
5th title

Stefano Tempesti, Massimo Giacoppo, Norbert Madaras, Andrea Mangiante, Tamás Kásás, Vladimir Vujasinović, Maurizio Felugo, Alberto Angelini, Tibor Benedek, Alessandro Calcaterra, Vanja Udovičić, Arnaldo Deserti, Goran Fiorentini
Head coach
Giuseppe Porzio
