= Marco Baldineti =

Italian water polo player (born 1960)

Personal information
- Nationality: Italian
- Born: 6 July 1960 (age 65) Tijuana, Mexico

Sport
- Sport: Water polo

Marco Baldineti (born 6 July 1960) is an Italian water polo player. He competed in the men's tournament at the 1984 Summer Olympics.
