= 2008–09 LEN Euroleague =

Water polo sports season

- League: LEN Euroleague
- Sport: Water Polo
- Duration: 2 October 2008 to 23 May 2009
- Number of teams: 16 (preliminary round); 43 (total)

Final Four
- Finals champions: (Montenegro) Primorac Kotor (1st title)
- Runners-up: (Italy) Pro Recco

Euroleague seasons
- ← 2007–08 2009–10 →

The LEN Euroleague 2008–09 was the 46th edition of Europe's premier club water polo competition.

== 1st qualification round ==
=== Group A (Košice) ===
Pos	Team	Pld	W	D	L	GF	GA	GD	Pts
1	(Italy) ASD CN Posillipo Napoli	5	4	0	1	80	38	+42	12
2	(Russia) Spartak Volgograd	5	4	0	1	74	37	+37	12
3	(Romania) Dinamo București	5	3	1	1	66	39	+27	10
4	(Slovakia) ČH Hornets Košice	5	2	1	2	68	48	+20	7
5	(Austria) WC Tirol Innsbruck	5	1	0	4	28	89	−61	3
6	(Poland) Arkonia Szczecin	5	0	0	5	27	92	−65	0

=== Group B (Porto) ===
Pos	Team	Pld	W	D	L	GF	GA	GD	Pts
1	(Greece) Panionios GSS Athens	6	5	1	0	78	29	+49	16
2	(Romania) CSM Leonardo Oradea	6	4	2	0	78	31	+47	14
3	(Netherlands) PSV-BA Eindhoven	6	4	1	1	85	44	+41	13
4	(France) Olympique GC Nice Natation	6	3	0	3	62	39	+23	9
5	BMK Kharkiv Ukraine	6	2	0	4	37	46	−9	6
6	(Portugal) SC Salgueiros Porto	6	1	0	5	25	97	−72	3
7	(England) SWPC West London Penguins	6	0	0	6	27	106	−79	0

=== Group C (Koper) ===
Pos	Team	Pld	W	D	L	GF	GA	GD	Pts
1	(Hungary) Budapest Honvéd	5	5	0	0	68	28	+40	15
2	(Montenegro) VK Budvanska Rijiveka	5	4	0	1	76	31	+45	12
3	(Germany) WF Spandau 04	5	3	0	2	42	41	+1	9
4	(Slovenia) AŠD Koper Rokava	5	2	0	3	41	56	−15	6
5	(Netherlands) Widex GZC Donk Gouda	5	1	0	4	41	65	−24	3
6	(England) Rotherham Metro	5	0	0	5	35	82	−47	0

=== Group D (Šibenik) ===
Pos	Team	Pld	W	D	L	GF	GA	GD	Pts
1	(Croatia) VK Šibenik NCP	5	5	0	0	78	28	+50	15
2	(France) Cercle des Nageurs de Marseille	5	4	0	1	75	30	+45	12
3	(Germany) ASC Duisburg	5	3	0	2	67	41	+26	9
4	(Ukraine) Illichivets Mariupol	5	2	0	3	48	48	0	6
5	(Poland) Łódźi STW	5	1	0	4	40	76	−36	3
6	(Portugal) Portinado	5	0	0	5	16	101	−85	0

== 2nd qualification round ==
=== Group E (Marseille) ===
Pos	Team	Pld	W	D	L	GF	GA	GD	Pts
1	(France) Cercle des Nageurs de Marseille	5	4	1	0	40	11	+29	13
2	(Italy) Brixia Leonessa Nuoto	5	4	0	1	57	41	+16	12
3	(Greece) Panionios GSS	5	2	1	2	48	45	+3	7
4	(Serbia) VK Vojvodina Novi Sad	5	2	0	3	40	40	0	6
5	(Slovenia) AŠDV Koper Rokava	5	1	1	3	48	63	−15	4
6	(Romania) Dinamo București	5	0	1	4	46	61	−15	1

=== Group F (Herceg Novi) ===
Pos	Team	Pld	W	D	L	GF	GA	GD	Pts
1	(Montenegro) PVK Jadran CKB Herceg Novi	5	4	1	0	75	30	+45	13
2	(Russia) Spartak Volgograd	5	4	0	1	61	30	+31	12
3	(Hungary) Budapest Honvéd	5	3	0	2	67	38	+29	9
4	(Netherlands) PSV Eindhoven	5	2	0	3	29	60	−31	6
5	(Greece) Ethnikos Piraeus OFPF	5	1	1	3	29	67	−38	4
6	(Ukraine) Illichivets Mariupol	5	0	0	5	26	62	−36	0

=== Group G (Duisburg) ===
Pos	Team	Pld	W	D	L	GF	GA	GD	Pts
1	(Croatia) VK Jug Dubrovnik	5	5	0	0	78	34	+44	15
2	(Montenegro) PVK Budvanska Rivijera	5	4	0	1	66	51	+15	12
3	(Russia) Sintez Kazan	5	2	1	2	52	51	+1	7
4	(Italy) CN Posillipo Napoli	5	1	2	2	62	65	−3	5
5	(Germany) ASC Duisburg	5	1	1	3	56	65	−9	4
6	(France) Olympique GC Nice Natation	5	0	0	5	32	80	−48	0

=== Group H (Eger) ===
Pos	Team	Pld	W	D	L	GF	GA	GD	Pts
1	(Croatia) VK Šibenik NCP	5	5	0	0	48	32	+16	15
2	(Hungary) ZF Eger	5	3	1	1	46	32	+14	10
3	(Romania) CS Leonardo Oradea	5	1	2	2	37	39	−2	5
4	(Spain) CN Barcelona	5	1	2	2	29	33	−4	5
5	(Germany) WS Spandau 04	5	1	1	3	40	38	+2	4
6	(Slovakia) ČH Hornets Košice	5	1	0	4	22	48	−26	3

== Preliminary round ==
Key to colors in group tables
Group winners and runners-up advanced to the Quarter-finals

=== Group A ===
Team	Pld	W	D	L	GF	GA	GD	Pts
(Italy) Pro Recco	6	4	0	2	67	48	+19	12
(Croatia) Jug Dubrovnik	6	3	1	2	64	43	+21	10
(Russia) Spartak Volgograd	6	3	0	3	43	62	−19	9
(Russia) Šturm 2002	6	1	1	4	42	63	−21	4

Matchday One

Jug Dubrovnik	10–9	Pro Recco

Spartak Volgograd	8–6	Shturm Chekhovo

Matchday Two

Shturm Chekhovo	8–8	Jug Dubrovnik

Pro Recco	15–7	Spartak Volgograd

Matchday Three

Jug Dubrovnik	16–5	Spartak Volgograd

Shturm Chekhov	13–12	Pro Recco

Matchday Four

Pro Recco	10–3	Shturm Chekhovo

Spartak Volgograd	7–6	Jug Dubrovnik

Matchday Five

Jug Dubrovnik	16–5	Shturm Chekhovo

Spartak Volgograd	7–12	Pro Recco

Matchday Six

Pro Recco	9–8	Jug Dubrovnik

Shturm Chekhovo	7–9	Spartak Volgograd

=== Group B ===
Team	Pld	W	D	L	GF	GA	GD	Pts
(Montenegro) Jadran Herceg Novi	6	3	2	1	62	53	+9	11
(Croatia) HAVK Mladost	6	2	3	1	44	49	−5	9
(Montenegro) Budva	6	2	1	3	53	55	−2	7
(Spain) Atlètic-Barceloneta	6	1	2	3	52	54	−2	5

Matchday One

Mladost Zagreb	7–6	Budvanska Rijivera

Jadran Herceg Novi	7–6	Atlètic Barceloneta

Matchday Two

Atlètic Barceloneta	7–7	Mladost Zagreb

Shturm Chekhov	14–10	Jadran Herceg Novi

Matchday Three

Jadran Herceg Novi	11–4	Mladost Zagreb

Budvanska Rivijera	13–10	Atlètic Barceloneta

Matchday Four

Atlètic Barceloneta	9–6	Budvanska Rivijera

Mladost Zagreb	10–10	Jadran Herceg Novi

Matchday Five

Mladost Zagreb	10–9	Atlètic Barceloneta

Jadran Herceg Novi	13–8	Budvanska Rivijera

Matchday Six

Atlètic Barceloneta	11–11	Jadran Herceg Novi

Budvanska Rivijera	6–6	Mladost Zagreb

=== Group C ===
Team	Pld	W	D	L	GF	GA	GD	Pts
(Greece) Olympiacos	6	5	1	0	61	45	+16	16
(Montenegro) Primorac Kotor	6	4	0	2	73	47	+26	12
(Croatia) Šibenik	6	2	1	3	48	65	−17	7
(Italy) Brixia Leonessa	6	0	0	6	46	71	−25	0

Matchday One

Olympiacos Peiraios	10–7	Brixia Leonessa

Primorac Kotor	13–6	Šibenik NCP

Matchday Two

Šibenik NCP	9–9	Olympiacos Peiraios

Brixia Leonessa	9–13	Primorac Kotor

Matchday Three

Brixia Leonessa	7–8	Šibenik NCP

Primorac Kotor	7–9	Olympiacos Peiraios

Matchday Four

Olympiacos Peiraios	9–8	Primorac Kotor

Šibenik NCP	12–8	Brixia Leonessa

Matchday Five

Primorac Kotor	15–7	Brixia Leonessa

Olympiacos Peiraios	11–6	Šibenik NCP

Matchday Six

Šibenik NCP	7–17	Primorac Kotor

Brixia Leonessa	8–13	Olympiacos Peiraios

=== Group D ===
Team	Pld	W	D	L	GF	GA	GD	Pts
(Serbia) Partizan	6	5	1	0	72	49	+23	16
(Hungary) Vasas	6	4	0	2	60	46	+14	12
(Hungary) Eger	6	0	3	3	51	56	−5	3
(France) Marseille	6	0	2	4	49	81	−32	2

Matchday One

ZF Eger	7–9	Vasas SC Budapest

Partizan Belgrade	22–5	Nageurs de Marseille

Matchday Two

Vasas SC Budapest	7–8	Partizan Belgrade

Nageurs de Marseille	9–9	ZF Eger

Matchday Three

Nageurs de Marseille	6–10	Vasas SC Budapest

ZF Eger	7–7	Partizan Belgrade

Matchday Four

Vasas SC Budapest	16–6	Nageurs de Marseille

Partizan Belgrade	11–9	ZF Eger

Matchday Five

Partizan Belgrade	9–7	Vasas SC Budapest

ZF Eger	9–9	Nageurs de Marseille

Matchday Six

Vasas SC Budapest	11–10	ZF Eger

Nageurs de Marseille	14–15	Partizan Belgrade

== Knockout stage ==
=== Quarter-finals ===
The first legs were played on 4 April, and the second legs were played on 22 April 2009.

Team 1	Agg.	Team 2	1st leg	2nd leg
Olympiacos (Greece)	14–16	(Croatia) HAVK Mladost	8–5	6–11
Partizan (Serbia)	18–20	(Croatia) Jug Dubrovnik	11–9	7–11
Primorac Kotor (Montenegro)	21–20	(Montenegro) Jadran Herceg Novi	12–12	9–8
Vasas (Hungary)	18–20	(Italy) Pro Recco	8–11	10–9

== Final Four ==
Semifinals; 22 May 2009
(Croatia) Jug Dubrovnik	6
(Italy) Pro Recco	9
(Croatia) HAVK Mladost	9
(Montenegro) Primorac Kotor	11

Final; 23 May 2009
(Italy) Pro Recco	7
(Montenegro) Primorac Kotor (aet)	8
Third place
(Croatia) Jug Dubrovnik	14
(Croatia) HAVK Mladost	13

=== Final standings ===
	Team
	(Montenegro) Primorac Kotor
Silver medal	(Italy) Pro Recco
Bronze medal	(Croatia) Jug Dubrovnik
	(Croatia) HAVK Mladost

2008–09 LEN Euroleague
Champions

Primorac Kotor
1st Cup

== See also ==
- 2008–09 LEN Trophy
