= Teo Đogaš =

Croatian water polo player

Personal information
- Nationality: Croatia
- Born: 19 February 1977 (age 49) Split, Yugoslavia

Sport
- Sport: Water polo

Senior clubs
- Years: Team
- 1989–1996 1996–1998 1998–2000 2000–2001 2001–2002: VK Mornar; Jadran Spalato; POŠK Split; Olympiacos; AS Pescara
Medal record
Men's water polo
Representing Croatia
World Championship
| Gold medal – first place | 2007 Melbourne | Team competition |
European Championship
| Silver medal – second place | 1999 Florence | Team competition |
| Silver medal – second place | 2003 Kranj | Team competition |

Teo Đogaš (born 19 February 1977 in Split) is a water polo player from Croatia, who was a member of the men's national team that won the world title at the 2007 World Aquatics Championships in Melbourne, Australia. At club level, Đogaš played most notably for Olympiacos, HAVK Mladost, POŠK Split, Jadran Split, AS Pescara and VA Cattaro.

== Honours ==
=== Club ===
POŠK Split

- LEN Champions League (1): 1998–99
- Croatian Cup (1): 1999–00

Olympiacos

- Greek Water Polo League (1): 2000–01
- Greek Cup (1): 2000–01
- LEN Champions League Runner-up: 2000–01

HAVK Mladost

- Croatian League (1): 2007–08
- Croatian Cup (1): 2004–05

VA Cattaro

- LEN Euro Cup (1): 2009–10

== See also ==
- List of world champions in men's water polo
- List of World Aquatics Championships medalists in water polo
