= 1993–94 European Cup (water polo) =

Water polo tournament

- League: European Cup
- Sport: Water Polo
- Duration: to
- Number of teams: 8 (quarter-finals)
- Finals champions: (Hungary) Újpest (1st title)
- Runners-up: (Spain) Catalunya

European Cup seasons
- ← 1992–93 1994-95 →

The 1993–94 LEN European Cup was the 31st edition of LEN's premier competition for men's water polo clubs.

== Quarter-finals ==
Team 1	Agg.	Team 2	1st leg	2nd leg
Olympic Nice (France)	15–17	(Croatia) Jadran Split	7–8	8–9
Catalunya (Spain)	19–15	(Greece) Olympiacos	11–8	7–8
HAVK Mladost (Croatia)	18–20	(Hungary) Újpest	12–14	6–6
Posillipo (Italy)	20–8	(Russia) CSKA Moscow	13–4	7–4

== Semi-finals ==
Team 1	Agg.	Team 2	1st leg	2nd leg
Jadran Split (Croatia)	11–14	(Spain) Catalunya	6–6	5–8
Posillipo (Italy)	20–24	(Hungary) Újpest	11–11	9–13

== Finals ==
Team 1	Agg.	Team 2	1st leg	2nd leg
Újpest (Hungary)	21–17	(Spain) Catalunya	10–6	11–11

1993–94 European Cup
champions
(Hungary) Újpest
1st title

== See also ==
- 1993–94 LEN Cup Winners' Cup
- 1993–94 LEN Cup
