= 2003–04 LEN Euroleague =

Water polo sports season

- League: LEN Euroleague
- Sport: Water Polo
- Duration: 17 September 2003 to 29 May 2004
- Teams: 16 (preliminary round); 38 (total)

Final Four
- Finals champions: (Hungary) Bp. Honvéd (1st title)
- Runners-up: (Serbia and Montenegro) Jadran Herceg Novi

Euroleague seasons
- ← 2002–03 2004–05 →

The 2003–04 LEN Euroleague was the 41st edition of LEN's premier competition for men's water polo clubs. It ran from 17 September 2003 to 29 May 2004, and it was contested by 38 teams. The Final Four (semifinals, final, and third place game) took place on May 28 and May 29 in Budapest.

== Preliminary round ==
Location of teams of the 2003–04 LEN Euroleague group stage.
Red: Group A; Green: Group B; Blue: Group C; Yellow: Group D.

Key to colors in group tables
Group winners and runners-up advanced to the Quarter-finals

=== Group A ===
| Team | Pld | W | D | L | GF | GA | GD | Pts |
|---|---|---|---|---|---|---|---|---|
| (Russia) Šturm 2002 | 6 | 3 | 1 | 2 | 44 | 43 | +1 | 7 |
| (Croatia) Primorje | 6 | 3 | 1 | 2 | 43 | 46 | −3 | 7 |
| (Spain) Sabadell | 6 | 3 | 0 | 3 | 46 | 48 | −2 | 6 |
| (Germany) Spandau 04 | 6 | 1 | 2 | 3 | 48 | 46 | +2 | 4 |

=== Group B ===
| Team | Pld | W | D | L | GF | GA | GD | Pts |
|---|---|---|---|---|---|---|---|---|
| (Hungary) Vasas | 6 | 4 | 1 | 1 | 44 | 37 | +7 | 9 |
| (Spain) Atlètic-Barceloneta | 6 | 3 | 1 | 2 | 47 | 40 | +7 | 7 |
| (Greece) Olympiacos | 6 | 1 | 3 | 2 | 40 | 44 | −4 | 5 |
| (Serbia and Montenegro) Partizan | 5 | 1 | 1 | 3 | 36 | 46 | −10 | 3 |

=== Group C ===
| Team | Pld | W | D | L | GF | GA | GD | Pts |
|---|---|---|---|---|---|---|---|---|
| (Croatia) HAVK Mladost | 6 | 4 | 0 | 2 | 53 | 45 | +8 | 8 |
| (Serbia and Montenegro) Primorac Kotor | 6 | 3 | 1 | 2 | 44 | 37 | +7 | 7 |
| (Hungary) BVSC | 6 | 2 | 1 | 3 | 46 | 52 | −6 | 5 |
| (France) Olympic Nice | 6 | 1 | 2 | 3 | 39 | 48 | −9 | 4 |

=== Group D ===
| Team | Pld | W | D | L | GF | GA | GD | Pts |
|---|---|---|---|---|---|---|---|---|
| (Serbia and Montenegro) Jadran Herceg Novi | 6 | 3 | 2 | 1 | 53 | 45 | +8 | 8 |
| (Hungary) Honvéd | 6 | 2 | 2 | 2 | 47 | 44 | +3 | 6 |
| (Croatia) Jug Dubrovnik | 6 | 3 | 0 | 3 | 45 | 46 | −1 | 6 |
| (Russia) Spartak Volgograd | 6 | 1 | 2 | 3 | 43 | 49 | −6 | 4 |

== Knockout stage ==
=== Quarter-finals ===
The first legs were played on 14 April, and the second legs were played on 28 April 2004.

| Team 1 | Agg. | Team 2 | 1st leg | 2nd leg |
|---|---|---|---|---|
| Atlètic-Barceloneta (Spain) | 11–17 | (Serbia and Montenegro) Jadran Herceg Novi | 7–7 | 4–10 |
| HAVK Mladost (Croatia) | 11–13 | (Croatia) Primorje | 7–8 | 4–5 |
| Primorac Kotor (Serbia and Montenegro) | 13–14 | (Russia) Šturm 2002 | 7–6 | 6–8 |
| Vasas (Hungary) | 14–15 | (Hungary) Bp. Honvéd | 6–7 | 8–8 |

== Final Four ==
Hajós Alfréd Nemzeti Sportuszoda, Budapest, Hungary.

Semifinals; 28 May 2004
(Hungary) Bp. Honvéd | 7
(Croatia) Primorje | 6
(Russia) Šturm 2002 | 3
(Serbia and Montenegro) Jadran Herceg Novi | 5

Final; 29 May 2004
(Hungary) Bp. Honvéd | 7
(Serbia and Montenegro) Jadran Herceg Novi | 6
Third place
(Croatia) Primorje (aet) | 9
(Russia) Šturm 2002 | 7

=== Final standings ===
| | Team |
|---|---|
| | (Hungary) Bp. Honvéd |
| Silver medal | (Serbia and Montenegro) Jadran Herceg Novi |
| Bronze medal | (Croatia) Primorje |
| | (Russia) Šturm 2002 |

=== Awards ===
MVP: (Hungary) Péter Biros (Bp. Honvéd)

2003–04 LEN Euroleague
Champions

Bp. Honvéd
1st Cup

== See also ==
- 2003–04 LEN Trophy
