= 2012–13 LEN Champions League =

Water polo sports season

- League: LEN Champions League
- Sport: Water Polo
- Duration: 14 September 2012 to 1 June 2013
- Number of teams: 22 (preliminary round); 26 (total)
- Top scorer: (Spain) Felipe Perrone 31 goals (Atlètic-Barceloneta)

Final Four
- Finals champions: (Serbia) Crvena zvezda (1st title)
- Runners-up: (Croatia) Jug Dubrovnik
- Finals MVP: (Serbia) Andrija Prlainovic (Crvena Zvezda)

Champions League seasons
- ← 2011–12 2013–14 →

The 2012–13 LEN Champions League was the 50th edition of LEN's premier competition for men's water polo clubs. It ran from 14 September 2012 to 1 June 2013, and it was contested by thirty teams from eighteen countries. There was no defending champion as Pro Recco renounced to the competition for disagreements with the FIN on the number of allowed foreign players in the Italian clubs' squads. Runner-up Primorje Rijeka, former champions Mladost Zagreb and Vasas Budapest, Italy's CN Posillipo and any team from Montenegro also declined to take part in the competition. The Final Four (semifinals, final, and third place game) took place on May 31 and June 1 in Belgrade.

The final was played in front of 4,000 fans.

== Qualification round ==
Key to colors in group tables
Progress to the preliminary round

=== Group A (Tbilisi) ===
Team	Pld	W	D	L	GF	GA	GD	Pts
(Georgia (country)) Ligamus Tbilisi	3	3	0	0	44	21	+23	9
(Belarus) Vitbich	3	2	0	1	21	28	−7	6
(Spain) Sabadell	3	1	0	2	29	24	+5	3
(Poland) Arkonia Szkzecin	3	0	0	3	15	36	−21	0

Matchday One
Sabadell	6 – 7	Vitbich
Ligamus Tbilisi	16 – 4	Arkonia Szkzecin
Matchday Two
Arkonia Szkzecin	6 – 8	Vitbich
Ligamus Tbilisi	12 – 11	Sabadell
Matchday Three
Sabadell	12 – 5	Arkonia Szkzecin
Ligamus Tbilisi	16 – 6	Vitbich

=== Group B (Kreuzlingen) ===
Team	Pld	W	D	L	GF	GA	GD	Pts
(France) Marseille	3	3	0	0	69	15	+54	9
(Switzerland) Kreuzlingen	3	2	0	1	43	39	+4	6
(Denmark) Slagelse	3	1	0	2	34	40	−6	3
(Sweden) Jarfällä	3	0	0	3	17	69	−52	0

Matchday One
Jarfällä	1 – 29	Marseille
Kreuzlingen	12 – 11	Slagelse
Matchday Two
Marseille	21 – 6	Slagelse
Kreuzlingen	23 – 9	Jarfällä
Matchday Three
Jarfällä	7 – 17	Slagelse
Kreuzlingen	8 – 19	Marseille

== Preliminary round ==
Location of teams of the 2012–13 LEN Champions League group stage.
Red: Group A; Green: Group B; Blue: Group C; Yellow: Group D.

=== Group A ===
Pos	Team	Pld	W	D	L	GF	GA	GD	Pts
1	(Greece) Vouliagmeni	10	8	0	2	128	55	+73	24
2	(Russia) Spartak Volgograd	10	8	0	2	108	65	+43	24
3	(Hungary) Eger	10	8	0	2	131	64	+67	24
4	(Netherlands) Schuurman	10	4	0	6	65	108	−43	12
5	(Germany) Waspo'98 Hannover	10	1	1	8	44	109	−65	4
6	(Georgia (country)) Ligamus Tbilisi	10	0	1	9	58	133	−75	1

Matchday One – 26 September 2012
Vouliagmeni	11 – 6	Spartak Volgograd
Schuurman	6 – 5	Waspo'98 Hannover
15 January 2013
Eger	27 – 5	Ligamus Tbilisi
Matchday Two – 6 October 2012
Spartak Volgograd	10 – 7	Eger
Waspo'98 Hannover	4–18	Vouliagmeni
Schuurman	13–10	Ligamus Tbilisi
Matchday Three – 20 October 2012
Eger	16 – 5	Waspo'98 Hannover
Vouliagmeni	12 – 4	Schuurman
Ligamus Tbilisi	8 – 15	Spartak Volgograd
Matchday Four – 14 November 2012
Vouliagmeni	11 – 8	Eger
Schuurman	5 – 14	Spartak Volgograd
Waspo'98 Hannover	7 – 5	Ligamus Tbilisi
Matchday Five – 28 November 2012
Ligamus Tbilisi	5 – 15	Vouliagmeni
Eger	13 – 4	Schuurman
Spartak Volgograd	12 – 4	Waspo'98 Hannover
Matchday Six – 19 December 2012
Vouliagmeni	16 – 2	Ligamus Tbilisi
Schuurman	6 – 17	Eger
Waspo'98 Hannover	2 – 12	Spartak Volgograd
Matchday Seven – 9 January 2013
Eger	10–9	Vouliagmeni
Ligamus Tbilisi	6–6	Hannover
Spartak Volgograd	12–7	Schuurman
Matchday Eight – 23 January 2013
Spartak Volgograd	12–6	Ligamus Tbilisi
Hannover	4–13	Eger
Schuurman	3–15	Vouliagmeni
Matchday Nine – 6 February 2013
Eger	8–6	Spartak Volgograd
Vouliagmeni	14–4	Hannover
Ligamus Tbilisi	7–10	Schuurman
Matchday Ten – 27 February 2013
Spartak Volgograd	9–7	Vouliagmeni
Ligamus Tbilisi	4–12	Eger
Hannover	3–7	Schuurman

=== Group B ===
Pos	Team	Pld	W	D	L	GF	GA	GD	Pts
1	(Croatia) Jug Dubrovnik	8	8	0	0	129	40	+89	24
2	(Serbia) Crvena Zvezda	8	5	0	3	106	73	+33	15
3	(Greece) Olympiacos	8	5	0	3	105	64	+41	15
4	(France) Montpellier	8	2	0	6	65	100	−35	6
5	(Switzerland) Kreuzlingen	8	0	0	8	58	186	−128	0

Matchday One – 26 September 2012
Olympiacos	15 – 5	Kreuzlingen
Red Star Belgrade	6 – 10	Jug Dubrovnik
Matchday Two – 6 October 2012
Red Star Belgrade	26 – 7	Kreuzlingen
Montpellier	7 – 11	Olympiacos
Matchday Three – 20 October 2012
Jug Dubrovnik	29 – 7	Kreuzlingen
Red Star Belgrade	10 – 8	Montpellier
Matchday Four – 13 November 2012
Olympiakos	9 – 8	Red Star Belgrade
Montpellier	2 – 14	Jug Dubrovnik
Matchday Five – 28 November 2012
Jug Dubrovnik	10 – 8	Olympiakos
Montpellier	15 – 8	Kreuzlingen
Matchday Six – 19 December 2012
Olympiakos	2 – 9	Jug Dubrovnik
Kreuzlingen	6 – 14	Montpellier
Matchday Seven – 9 January 2013
Red Star Belgrade	11– 9	Olympiakos
Jug Dubrovnik	17–5	Montpellier
Matchday Eight – 23 January 2013
Montpellier	8–16	Red Star Belgrade
Kreuzlingen	5–30	Jug Dubrovnik
Matchday Nine – 6 February 2013
Olympiakos	18–6	Montpellier
Kreuzlingen	12–24	Red Star Belgrade
Matchday Ten – 27 February 2013
Jug Dubrovnik	10–5	Red Star Belgrade
Kreuzlingen	8–33	Olympiakos

=== Group C ===
Pos	Team	Pld	W	D	L	GF	GA	GD	Pts
1	(Spain) Barceloneta	8	6	0	2	74	51	+23	18
2	(Russia) Sintez Kazan	8	4	1	3	75	70	+5	13
3	(Italy) Brescia	8	4	0	4	72	71	+1	12
4	(France) Marseille	8	3	0	5	72	84	−12	9
5	(Serbia) Vojvodina	8	2	1	5	58	75	−17	7

Matchday One – 26 September 2012
Atlètic Barceloneta	10 – 7	Sintez Kazan
Brescia	13 – 9	Vojvodina
Matchday Two – 6 October 2012
Vojvodina	4 – 9	Atlètic Barceloneta
Marseille	9 – 7	Brescia
Matchday Three – 20 October 2012
Atlètic Barceloneta	15 – 4	Marseille
Sintez Kazan	9 – 10	Vojvodina
Matchday Four – 14 November 2012
Brescia	5 – 7	Atlètic Barceloneta
Marseille	8 – 13	Sintez Kazan
Matchday Five – 28 November 2012
Sintez Kazan	9 – 4	Brescia
Marseille	13 – 7	Vojvodina
Matchday Six – 19 December 2012
Brescia	16 – 12	Sintez Kazan
Vojvodina	10 – 9	Marseille
Matchday Seven – 9 January 2013
Sintez Kazan	11–9	Marseille
Atlètic Barceloneta	9–7	Brescia
Matchday Eight – 23 January 2013
Marseille	11–10	Atlètic Barceloneta
Vojvodina	6–6	Sintez Kazan
Matchday Nine – 6 February 2013
Brescia	11–9	Marseille
Atlètic Barceloneta	7–5	Vojvodina
Matchday Ten – 27 February 2013
Vojvodina	7–9	Brescia
Sintez Kazan	8–7	Atlètic Barceloneta

=== Group D ===
Pos	Team	Pld	W	D	L	GF	GA	GD	Pts
1	(Hungary) Szeged	8	7	0	1	81	56	+25	21
2	(Serbia) Partizan Belgrade	8	5	1	2	66	52	+14	16
3	(Turkey) Galatasaray	8	4	1	3	61	60	+1	13
4	(Romania) Oradea	8	2	0	6	70	85	−15	6
5	(Germany) Spandau 04	8	1	0	7	60	85	−25	3

Matchday One – 26 September 2012
Szeged	8 – 5	Spandau 04
Partizan Belgrade	5 – 5	Galatasaray
Matchday Two – 6 October 2012
Oradea	9 – 14	Szeged
Spandau 04	10 – 13	Partizan Belgrade
Matchday Three – 20 October 2012
Partizan Belgrade	8 – 7	Oradea
Galatasaray	10 – 7	Spandau 04
Matchday Four – 14 November 2012
Szeged	8 – 7	Partizan Belgrade
Oradea	11 – 8	Galatasaray
Matchday Five – 28 November 2012
Spandau 04	15 – 13	Oradea
Galatasaray	4 – 6	Szeged
Matchday Six – 18 December 2012
Szeged	11 – 8	Galatasaray
Oradea	11 – 7	Spandau 04
Matchday Seven – 9 January 2013
Partizan Belgrade	8–6	Szeged
Galatasaray	6–5	Oradea
Matchday Eight – 23 January 2013
Spandau 04	8–11	Galatasaray
Oradea	6–10	Partizan Belgrade
Matchday Nine – 6 February 2013
Szeged	17–8	Oradea
Partizan Belgrade	8–1	Spandau 04
Matchday Ten – 27 February 2013
Spandau 04	7–11	Szeged
Galatasaray	9–7	Partizan Belgrade

== Top 16 ==
The draw was held on 28 February 2013 in Rome, Italy. The first legs were played on 9–10 March, and the second legs were played on 20–21 March 2013.

Team 1	Agg.	Team 2	1st leg	2nd leg
Crvena Zvezda (Serbia)	21–14	(Hungary) Eger	13–6	8–8
Montpellier (France)	13–27	(Hungary) Szeged	6–9	7–18
Vouliagmeni (Greece)	26–25	(France) Marseille	16–12	10–13
Olympiacos (Greece)	19–21	(Russia) Spartak Volgograd	9–8	10–13
Atlètic-Barceloneta (Spain)	27–13	(Romania) Oradea	15–5	12–8
Schuurman (Netherlands)	8–36	(Croatia) Jug	1–19	7–17
Partizan (Serbia)	16–11	(Italy) Brescia	9–5	7–6
Galatasaray (Turkey)	20–17	(Russia) Sintez Kazan	9–6	11–11

== Quarterfinals ==
The draw was held on 25 March 2013 in Rome, Italy. The first legs were played on 17 April, and the second legs were played on 30 April and 1 May 2013.

Team 1	Agg.	Team 2	1st leg	2nd leg
Galatasaray (Turkey)	8–30	(Croatia) Jug	5–12	3–18
Vouliagmeni (Greece)	13–24	(Spain) Atlètic-Barceloneta	3–8	10–16
Szeged (Hungary)	16–17	(Serbia) Crvena Zvezda	5–7	11–10
Partizan (Serbia)	16–11	(Russia) Spartak Volgograd	11–6	5–5

== Final Four (Belgrade) ==
Tašmajdan Sports Center, Belgrade, Serbia

Semifinals; 31 May 2013
(Serbia) Partizan	7
(Croatia) Jug Dubrovnik	8
(Serbia) Crvena zvezda	9
(Spain) Atlètic-Barceloneta	5

Final; 1 June 2013
(Croatia) Jug Dubrovnik	7
(Serbia) Crvena zvezda	8
Third place
(Serbia) Partizan	10
(Spain) Atlètic-Barceloneta	11

Semi-finals

31 May; 17:00	[ Report]	Partizan (Serbia)	7–8	(Croatia) Jug Dubrovnik	Tašmajdan Sports Center, Belgrade; Referees: Alexandrescu, Caputi
31 May; 17:00	[ Report]	Score by quarters: 1–2, 1–2, 3–2, 2–2			Tašmajdan Sports Center, Belgrade; Referees: Alexandrescu, Caputi
31 May; 17:00	[ Report]	Mandić 2	Goals	Bošković, Janović 2	Tašmajdan Sports Center, Belgrade; Referees: Alexandrescu, Caputi

31 May; 20:15	[ Report]	Crvena zvezda (Serbia)	9–5	(Spain) Atlètic-Barceloneta	Tašmajdan Sports Center, Belgrade; Referees: Koganov, Margeta
31 May; 20:15	[ Report]	Score by quarters: 2–2, 2–0, 3–3, 2–0			Tašmajdan Sports Center, Belgrade; Referees: Koganov, Margeta
31 May; 20:15	[ Report]	Rašović 3	Goals	Vrlić, Alferez 2	Tašmajdan Sports Center, Belgrade; Referees: Koganov, Margeta

Third place

1 June 2013; 17:00	[ Report]	Partizan (Serbia)	10–11	(Spain) Atlètic-Barceloneta	Tašmajdan Sports Center, Belgrade; Referees: Koganov, Margeta
1 June 2013; 17:00	[ Report]	Score by quarters: 2–4, 2–3, 3–2, 3–2			Tašmajdan Sports Center, Belgrade; Referees: Koganov, Margeta
1 June 2013; 17:00	[ Report]	four players 2	Goals	Vrlić 4	Tašmajdan Sports Center, Belgrade; Referees: Koganov, Margeta

Final

1 June 2013; 20:15	[ Report]	Jug Dubrovnik (Croatia)	7–8	(Serbia) Crvena zvezda	Tašmajdan Sports Center, Belgrade; Referees: Stavridis, Caputi
1 June 2013; 20:15	[ Report]	Score by quarters: 2–2, 1–1, 3–3, 1–2			Tašmajdan Sports Center, Belgrade; Referees: Stavridis, Caputi
1 June 2013; 20:15	[ Report]	Janović 3	Goals	Pijetlović 2	Tašmajdan Sports Center, Belgrade; Referees: Stavridis, Caputi

2012–13 Champions League
champions
(Serbia) Crvena zvezda
1st title

Denis Šefik, Strahinja Rašović, Nikola Rađen, Petar Ivošević, Mihajlo Milićević, Duško Pijetlović, Marko Avramović, Viktor Rašović, Sava Ranđelović, Boris Vapenski, Andrija Prlainović, Nikola Eškert, Marko Draksimović, Nenad Stojčić
Head coach
Dejan Savić

=== Final standings ===
	Team
	(Serbia) Crvena zvezda
Silver medal	(Croatia) Jug Dubrovnik
Bronze medal	(Spain) Atlètic-Barceloneta
	(Serbia) Partizan

=== Awards ===
Top Scorer	Final four MVP
(Spain) Felipe Perrone(CN Atlètic-Barceloneta) 42 goals	(Serbia) Andrija Prlainovic(Crvena Zvezda)
