= Albert Español =

Spanish water polo player (born 1985)

Personal information
- Full name: Albert Español Lifante
- Nationality: Spanish
- Born: 29 October 1985 (age 41)
- Height: 189 cm (74 in)
- Weight: 86 kg (190 lb)

Sport
- Sport: Water polo
- Position: Right Drive
- Current club: CN Atlètic-Barceloneta

Senior clubs
- Years: Team
- 2001–2007: CN Atlètic-Barceloneta
- 2007–2008: CN Mataró
- 2008–2011: CN Atlètic-Barceloneta
- 2011–2013: Florentia
- 2013–2016: CN Atlètic-Barceloneta
- 2016–2017: Olympiacos
- 2017–2018: CN Atlètic-Barceloneta
- 2018–2019: Ortigia
- 2019–: CN Echeyde
National team
- Years: Team
- 2009-2016: Spain
Medal record
Men's water polo
Representing Spain
World Championships
| Silver medal – second place | 2009 Rome | Team competition |

Albert Español Lifante (Note: In this Spanish name, the first or paternal surname is Español and the second or maternal family name is Lifante.) (born 29 October 1985) is a Spanish water polo player. At the 2012 Summer Olympics, he competed for the Spain men's national water polo team in the men's event. He is 6 ft 2 inches tall. At club level, he plays for Spanish powerhouse CN Atlètic-Barceloneta.

== Honours ==
Florentia

- LEN Euro Cup runners-up: 2012–13

CN Atlètic-Barceloneta

- LEN Champions League: 2013–14
- LEN Super Cup: 2014
- Spanish Championship: 2000–01, 2002–03, 2005–06, 2006–07, 2008–09, 2009–10, 2010–11, 2012–13, 2013–14, 2014–15, 2015–16, 2017–18
- Copa del Rey: 2001, 2004, 2006, 2007, 2009, 2010, 2014, 2015, 2016, 2018
- Supercopa de España: 2001, 2003, 2004, 2006, 2007, 2009, 2010, 2011,2013, 2015, 2016, 2018

Olympiacos

- Greek Championship: 2016–17

== Awards ==
- European Championship Top Scorer: 2014 Budapest
- Spanish Championship Top Scorer: 2013–14 with CN Atlètic-Barceloneta, 2020–21 with CN Echeyde
- LEN Champions League Final Six MVP: 2014 with CN Atlètic-Barceloneta

== See also ==
- Spain men's Olympic water polo team records and statistics
- List of World Aquatics Championships medalists in water polo
