= 1994–95 European Cup (water polo) =

Water polo tournament

- League: European Cup
- Sport: Water Polo
- Duration: to
- Number of teams: 8 (quarter-finals)
- Finals champions: (Spain) Catalunya (1st title)
- Runners-up: (Hungary) Újpest

European Cup seasons
- ← 1993–94 1995-96 →

The 1994–95 LEN European Cup was the 32nd edition of LEN's premier competition for men's water polo clubs.

== Quarter-finals ==
| Team 1 | Agg. | Team 2 | 1st leg | 2nd leg |
|---|---|---|---|---|
| Catalunya (Spain) | 21–16 | (Netherlands) Amersfoort | 11–8 | 10–8 |
| Ethnikos Piraeus (Greece) | 13–25 | (Hungary) Újpest | 8–12 | 5–13 |
| HAVK Mladost (Croatia) | 17–16 | (Italy) Posillipo | 7–6 | 10–10 |
| Steaua București (Romania) | 11–12 | (Germany) Spandau 04 | 5–4 | 6–8 |

== Semi-finals ==
| Team 1 | Agg. | Team 2 | 1st leg | 2nd leg |
|---|---|---|---|---|
| Catalunya (Spain) | 11–10 | (Croatia) HAVK Mladost | 5–4 | 6–6 |
| Spandau 04 (Germany) | 9–17 | (Hungary) Újpest | 5–9 | 4–8 |

== Finals ==
| Team 1 | Agg. | Team 2 | 1st leg | 2nd leg |
|---|---|---|---|---|
| Catalunya (Spain) | 15–13 | (Hungary) Újpest | 7–6 | 8–7 |

1994–95 LEN European Cup
champions
(Spain) Catalunya
1st title

== See also ==
- 1994–95 LEN Cup Winners' Cup
- 1994–95 LEN Cup
