= 2013–14 LEN Champions League =

Water polo season

- League: LEN Champions League
- Sport: Water Polo
- Finals champions: (Spain) Atlètic-Barceloneta
- Runners-up: (Serbia) Radnički
- Finals MVP: (Spain) Albert Español (CN Atlètic-Barceloneta)

Champions League seasons
- ← 2012–13 2014−15 →

The 2013–14 LEN Champions League was the 51st edition of LEN's premier competition for men's water polo clubs. The Final Six (quarterfinals, semifinals, final, and third place game) took place May 28 to May 31 in Barcelona.

== Final Six (Barcelona) ==
Piscines Bernat Picornell, Barcelona, Spain

Quarterfinals; 29 May 2014
A2	(Italy) Pro Recco	18
B3	(Serbia) Partizan (pen)	19
A3	(Spain) Atlètic-Barceloneta	6
B2	(Italy) Brescia	4

Semifinals; 30 May 2014
B1	(Serbia) Radnički	9
B3	(Serbia) Partizan	4
A1	(Croatia) Primorje	8
A3	(Spain) Atlètic-Barceloneta	10
5th place
A2	(Italy) Pro Recco	9
B2	(Italy) Brescia	10

Final; 31 May 2014
B1	(Serbia) Radnički	6
A3	(Spain) Atlètic-Barceloneta	7
Third place
B3	(Serbia) Partizan	6
A1	(Croatia) Primorje	12

Quarter-finals

29 May; 18:00	Report	Pro Recco (Italy)	18–19	(Serbia) Partizan	Piscines Bernat Picornell, Barcelona; Referees: Martin, Bottlik
29 May; 18:00	Report	Score by quarters: 3–2, 3–3, 5–5, 1–2 OT: pen. 6–7			Piscines Bernat Picornell, Barcelona; Referees: Martin, Bottlik
29 May; 18:00	Report	Joković 4	Goals	Subotić, Ćuk 5	Piscines Bernat Picornell, Barcelona; Referees: Martin, Bottlik

29 May; 19:30	Report	Atlètic-Barceloneta (Spain)	6–4	(Italy) Brescia	Piscines Bernat Picornell, Barcelona; Referees: Margeta, Alexandrescu
29 May; 19:30	Report	Score by quarters: 3–1, 1–1, 1–2, 1–0			Piscines Bernat Picornell, Barcelona; Referees: Margeta, Alexandrescu
29 May; 19:30	Report	Español, Fernández 2	Goals	Rizzo 2	Piscines Bernat Picornell, Barcelona; Referees: Margeta, Alexandrescu

5th place

30 May; 16:30	Report	Pro Recco (Italy)	9–10	(Italy) Brescia	Piscines Bernat Picornell, Barcelona; Referees: Kun, Alexandrescu
30 May; 16:30	Report	Score by quarters: 2–2, 3–0, 2–6, 2–2			Piscines Bernat Picornell, Barcelona; Referees: Kun, Alexandrescu
30 May; 16:30	Report	Figlioli, Ivović 3	Goals	Napolitano 3	Piscines Bernat Picornell, Barcelona; Referees: Kun, Alexandrescu

Semi-finals

30 May; 18:00	Report	Partizan (Serbia)	4–9	(Serbia) Radnički	Piscines Bernat Picornell, Barcelona; Referees: Margeta, Koganov
30 May; 18:00	Report	Score by quarters: 1–2, 2–3, 1–2, 1–2			Piscines Bernat Picornell, Barcelona; Referees: Margeta, Koganov
30 May; 18:00	Report	Mandić 2	Goals	Zloković 4	Piscines Bernat Picornell, Barcelona; Referees: Margeta, Koganov

30 May; 19:30	Report	Atlètic-Barceloneta (Spain)	10–8	(Croatia) Primorje	Piscines Bernat Picornell, Barcelona; Referees: Stavridis, Koryzna
30 May; 19:30	Report	Score by quarters: 2–3, 5–0, 2–3, 1–2			Piscines Bernat Picornell, Barcelona; Referees: Stavridis, Koryzna
30 May; 19:30	Report	Español 3	Goals	Dé. Varga, García 2	Piscines Bernat Picornell, Barcelona; Referees: Stavridis, Koryzna

Third place

31 May; 18:30	Report	Partizan (Serbia)	6–12	(Croatia) Primorje	Piscines Bernat Picornell, Barcelona; Referees: Alexandrescu, Kun
31 May; 18:30	Report	Score by quarters: 2–0, 0–3, 4–4, 0–5			Piscines Bernat Picornell, Barcelona; Referees: Alexandrescu, Kun
31 May; 18:30	Report	Ćuk 2	Goals	Dé. Varga 3	Piscines Bernat Picornell, Barcelona; Referees: Alexandrescu, Kun

Final

31 May; 20:00	Report	Radnički (Serbia)	6–7	(Spain) Atlètic-Barceloneta	Piscines Bernat Picornell, Barcelona; Referees: Margeta, Stavridis
31 May; 20:00	Report	Score by quarters: 2–1, 1–2, 1–3, 2–1			Piscines Bernat Picornell, Barcelona; Referees: Margeta, Stavridis
31 May; 20:00	Report	Zloković, Filipović 2	Goals	Español 2	Piscines Bernat Picornell, Barcelona; Referees: Margeta, Stavridis

2013–14 Champions League
Champions
(Spain) Atlètic-Barceloneta
1st title

Daniel Pinedo, Balázs Szirányi, Felipe Perrone, Alberto Munárriz, Albert Español, Marc Minguell, Marc Roca, Gonzalo Echenique, Nemanja Ubović, Francisco Fernández, Rubén de Lera, Marko Petković, Mario Lloret
Head coach
Jesús Martín

=== Final standings ===
	Team
	(Spain) Atlètic-Barceloneta
Silver medal	(Serbia) Radnički
Bronze medal	(Croatia) Primorje
	(Serbia) Partizan
	(Italy) Brescia
	(Italy) Pro Recco

=== Awards ===
Player of the Season, Top Scorer	Final Six MVP
(Serbia) Filip Filipović (VK Radnički Kragujevac) 51 goals	(Spain) Albert Español (CN Atlètic-Barceloneta)

== See also ==
- 2013–14 LEN Euro Cup
