= Ognjen Kržić =

Croatian water polo player

Personal information
- Born: 13 March 1969 (age 57) Dubrovnik, Croatia, Yugoslavia
- Height: 192 cm (6 ft 4 in)
- Weight: 92 kg (203 lb)

Sport
- Sport: Water polo
Medal record
Representing Croatia
Olympic Games
Silver medal – second place	1996 Atlanta	Team competition

Ognjen Kržić (born 13 March 1969) is a water polo player from Croatia, who was a member of the national team that won the silver medal at the 1996 Summer Olympics in Atlanta, Georgia.

== See also ==
- List of Olympic medalists in water polo (men)
