= 2006–07 LEN Euroleague =

Water polo sports season

- League: LEN Euroleague
- Sport: Water Polo
- Duration: 5 October 2006 to 23 June 2007
- Number of teams: 16 (preliminary round); 40 (total)

Final Four
- Finals champions: (Italy) Pro Recco (4th title)
- Runners-up: (Croatia) Jug Dubrovnik

Euroleague seasons
- ← 2005–06 2007–08 →

The 2006–07 LEN Euroleague was the 44th edition of LEN's premier competition for men's water polo clubs. It ran from 5 October 2006 to 23 June 2007, and it is contested by 40 teams. The Final Four (semifinals, final, and third place game) took place on June 22 and June 23 in Milan.

== Preliminary round ==
Location of teams of the 2006–07 LEN Euroleague group stage.
Red: Group A; Green: Group B; Blue: Group C; Yellow: Group D.

Key to colors in group tables
Group winners and runners-up advanced to the Quarter-finals

=== Group A ===
Team	Pld	W	D	L	GF	GA	GD	Pts
(Serbia) Partizan	6	4	1	1	59	46	+13	13
(Italy) Leonessa	6	3	2	1	49	49	0	11
(Greece) Ethnikos Piraeus	6	1	2	3	53	57	−4	5
(Croatia) HAVK Mladost	6	1	1	4	47	56	−9	4

=== Group B ===
Team	Pld	W	D	L	GF	GA	GD	Pts
(Croatia) Jug Dubrovnik	6	5	1	0	70	42	+28	16
(Greece) Olympiacos	6	3	1	2	64	56	+8	10
(France) Marseille	6	3	0	3	43	57	−14	9
(Spain) Barcelona	6	0	0	6	50	72	−22	0

=== Group C ===
Team	Pld	W	D	L	GF	GA	GD	Pts
(Italy) Pro Recco	6	4	2	0	68	57	+11	14
(Hungary) Vasas	6	3	0	3	61	53	+8	9
(Hungary) Eger	6	2	2	2	54	63	−9	8
(Russia) Šturm 2002	6	0	2	4	67	77	−10	2

=== Group D ===
Team	Pld	W	D	L	GF	GA	GD	Pts
(Hungary) Honvéd	6	5	0	1	81	53	+28	15
(Italy) Posillipo	6	3	1	2	64	68	−4	10
(Spain) Atlètic-Barceloneta	6	3	1	2	64	63	+1	10
(Greece) Panionios	6	0	0	6	47	72	−25	0

== Knockout stage ==
=== Quarter-finals ===
The first legs were played on 5 May, and the second legs were played on 23 May 2007.

Team 1	Agg.	Team 2	1st leg	2nd leg
Leonessa (Italy)	17–18	(Italy) Pro Recco	9–12	8–6
Olympiacos (Greece)	22–18	(Hungary) Bp. Honvéd	11–9	11–9
Posillipo (Italy)	13–20	(Serbia) Partizan	6–7	7–13
Vasas (Hungary)	18–19	(Croatia) Jug Dubrovnik	11–10	7–9

== Final Four ==
Piscina Scarioni, Milan, Italy.

Semifinals; 22 June 2007
(Greece) Olympiacos	9
(Italy) Pro Recco	10
(Serbia) Partizan	13 (4)
(Croatia) Jug Dubrovnik (p)	13 (5)

Final; 23 June 2007
(Italy) Pro Recco	9
(Croatia) Jug Dubrovnik	8
Third place
(Greece) Olympiacos	13
(Serbia) Partizan (aet)	15

=== Final standings ===
	Team
	(Italy) Pro Recco
Silver medal	(Croatia) Jug Dubrovnik
Bronze medal	(Serbia) Partizan
	(Greece) Olympiacos

2006–07 LEN Euroleague
Champions

Pro Recco
4th Cup

== See also ==
- 2006–07 LEN Cup
