= 2004–05 LEN Euroleague =

Water polo sports season

- League: LEN Euroleague
- Sport: Water Polo
- Duration: 29 September 2004 to 21 May 2005
- Teams: 16 (preliminary round); 35 (total)

Final Four
- Finals champions: (Italy) Posillipo (3rd title)
- Runners-up: (Hungary) Bp. Honvéd

Euroleague seasons
- ← 2003–04 2005–06 →

The 2004–05 LEN Euroleague was the 42nd edition of LEN's premier competition for men's water polo clubs. It ran from 29 September 2004 to 21 May 2005, and it was contested by thirty five teams from fifteen countries. CN Posillipo defeated defending champion Budapest Honvéd in the final to win its third title, while Pro Recco was third and Jug Dubrovnik fourth.

== First qualifying round ==
Pos	Team	Pld	W	D	L	GF	GA	GD	Pts
1	(Italy) Brixia Leonessa	5	5	0	0	60	27	+33	15
2	(Hungary) Ferencvárosi	5	4	0	1	39	24	+15	12
3	(Turkey) Galatasaray	5	3	0	2	44	37	+7	9
4	(Greece) Patras	5	2	0	3	28	36	−8	6
5	(Slovenia) Triglav Kranj	5	1	0	4	35	42	−7	3
6	(Netherlands) Alphen	5	0	0	5	19	59	−40	0

Pos	Team	Pld	W	D	L	GF	GA	GD	Pts
1	(Italy) Pro Recco	5	5	0	0	58	17	+41	15
2	(Federal Republic of Yugoslavia) Primorac Kotor	4	3	0	1	43	22	+21	9
3	(Poland) Lodz	5	3	0	2	44	37	+7	9
4	(Netherlands) Polar Bears Ede	6	2	0	4	33	36	−3	6
5	(Ukraine) Illichivets Mariupol	4	1	0	3	24	43	−19	3
6	(Austria) Tirol Innsbruck	4	1	0	3	20	147	−127	3
7	(Israel) ASA Tel Aviv	4	0	0	4	26	46	−20	0

Pos	Team	Pld	W	D	L	GF	GA	GD	Pts
1	(Croatia) Mladost Zagreb	5	5	0	0	81	24	+57	15
2	(Turkey) Yüzme	5	4	0	1	42	44	−2	12
3	(Russia) CSKA Moscow	5	3	0	2	44	44	0	9
4	(Germany) Bayer Uerdingen	5	2	0	3	43	54	−11	6
5	(France) Taverny 95	5	1	0	4	40	59	−19	3
6	(Slovenia) Koper	5	0	0	5	23	48	−25	0

== Second qualifying round ==
Pos	Team	Pld	W	D	L	GF	GA	GD	Pts
1	(Russia) Shturm Chekhov	5	5	0	0	66	23	+43	15
2	(Croatia) Mladost Zagreb	5	4	0	1	54	26	+28	12
3	(Greece) Patras	5	2	0	3	36	41	−5	6
4	(Germany) Duisburg	5	2	0	3	26	44	−18	6
5	(France) Taverny 95	5	1	0	4	30	61	−31	3
6	(Poland) Lodz	5	1	0	4	29	46	−17	3

Pos	Team	Pld	W	D	L	GF	GA	GD	Pts
1	(Hungary) Vasas Budapest	5	5	0	0	47	28	+19	15
2	(Italy) Brixia Leonessa	5	4	0	1	57	24	+33	12
3	(Federal Republic of Yugoslavia) Primorac Kotor	5	3	0	2	50	32	+18	9
4	(France) Marseille	5	2	0	3	50	37	+13	6
5	(Russia) CSKA Moscow	5	1	0	4	30	42	−12	3
6	(Austria) Tirol Innsbruck	5	0	0	5	12	80	−68	0

Pos	Team	Pld	W	D	L	GF	GA	GD	Pts
1	(Italy) Posillipo	5	5	0	0	68	20	+48	15
2	(Federal Republic of Yugoslavia) Niš	5	4	0	1	35	30	+5	12
3	(Hungary) Ferencvárosi	5	3	0	2	44	32	+12	9
4	(Netherlands) Polar Bears Ede	5	2	0	3	35	48	−13	6
5	(Ukraine) Illichivets Mariupol	5	1	0	4	22	48	−26	3
6	(Turkey) Yüzme	5	0	0	5	29	58	−29	0

Pos	Team	Pld	W	D	L	GF	GA	GD	Pts
1	(Italy) Pro Recco	5	5	0	0	54	18	+36	15
2	(Croatia) Primorje Rijeka	5	4	0	1	62	38	+24	12
3	(Slovenia) Triglav Kranj	5	3	0	2	40	52	−12	9
4	(Greece) Vouliagmeni	5	2	0	3	37	43	−6	6
5	(Turkey) Galatasaray	5	1	0	4	37	43	−6	3
6	(Germany) Bayer Uerdingen	5	0	0	5	25	56	−31	0

== Preliminary round ==
Location of teams of the 2004–05 LEN Euroleague group stage.
Red: Group A; Green: Group B; Blue: Group C; Yellow: Group D.

Key to colors in group tables
Group winners and runners-up advanced to the Quarter-finals

=== Group A ===
Team	Pld	W	D	L	GF	GA	GD	Pts
(Croatia) Jug Dubrovnik	6	5	1	0	65	43	+22	11
(Hungary) Vasas	6	4	1	1	52	46	+6	9
(France) Olympic Nice	6	1	0	5	53	49	+4	2
(Serbia and Montenegro) Niš	6	1	0	5	37	53	−16	2

=== Group B ===
Team	Pld	W	D	L	GF	GA	GD	Pts
(Italy) Pro Recco	6	3	3	0	46	38	+8	9
(Serbia and Montenegro) Jadran Herceg Novi	6	3	1	2	49	40	+9	7
(Croatia) HAVK Mladost	6	2	1	3	38	48	−10	5
(Spain) Atlètic-Barceloneta	6	1	1	4	39	46	−7	3

=== Group C ===
Team	Pld	W	D	L	GF	GA	GD	Pts
(Italy) Posillipo	6	5	0	1	59	39	+20	10
(Russia) Spartak Volgograd	6	2	1	3	41	47	−6	5
(Croatia) Primorje	6	2	1	3	40	46	−6	5
(Germany) Spandau 04	6	2	0	4	44	50	−6	4

=== Group D ===
Team	Pld	W	D	L	GF	GA	GD	Pts
(Hungary) Honvéd	6	5	0	1	60	42	+18	10
(Italy) Leonessa	6	4	0	2	46	44	+2	8
(Russia) Šturm 2002	6	2	1	3	51	55	−4	5
(Greece) Olympiacos	6	0	1	5	34	50	−16	1

== Knockout stage ==
=== Quarter-finals ===
The first legs were played on 30 March, and the second legs were played on 20 April 2005.

Team 1	Agg.	Team 2	1st leg	2nd leg
Bp. Honvéd (Hungary)	25–14	(Russia) Spartak Volgograd	13–6	12–8
Jadran Herceg Novi (Serbia and Montenegro)	16–17	(Croatia) Jug Dubrovnik	8–8	8–9
Leonessa (Italy)	11–12	(Italy) Posillipo	8–8	3–4
Vasas (Hungary)	14–19	(Italy) Pro Recco	6–10	8–9

=== Final Four ===
Piscina Felice Scandone, Naples, Italy.

Semifinals; 20 May 2005
(Croatia) Jug Dubrovnik	9
(Hungary) Bp. Honvéd (aet)	10
(Italy) Pro Recco	6
(Italy) Posillipo	7

Final; 21 May 2005
(Hungary) Bp. Honvéd	8
(Italy) Posillipo (aet)	9
Third place
(Croatia) Jug Dubrovnik	7
(Italy) Pro Recco	11

=== Final standings ===
	Team
	(Italy) Posillipo
Silver medal	(Hungary) Bp. Honvéd
Bronze medal	(Italy) Pro Recco
	(Croatia) Jug Dubrovnik

2004–05 LEN Euroleague
Champions

Posillipo
3rd Cup

== See also ==
- 2004–05 LEN Trophy
