= VK Bečej =

Sports team

PVK Bečej
- Sport: Water polo
- Founded: 1947; 78 years ago
- League: Serbian Water Polo First A League
- Based in: Bečej, Serbia

PVK Bečej (full name: Plivački i Vaterpolo klub Bečej; lit. Swimming and Water polo club Bečej) is a swimming and water polo club from Bečej, Serbia. As of 2025–26 season, the club competes in the third-tier Serbian Water Polo First A League.

== History ==
The club was established in 1947. Its golden years came in the mid-1990s, when the club won the National Championships and National Cups of FR Yugoslavia for six consecutive seasons, from 1995–96 to 2000–01 season. VK Bečej also made LEN Champions League Final Four appearances in 1997 and 1998.

The biggest success in club's history was winning the 1999–2000 LEN Champions League trophy, becoming only the second Serbian team after VK Partizan to win the top-tier European water polo club competition. Aleksandar Šapić led the team to the 1999–00 title, scoring 5 goals in the final versus Zagreb-based HAVK Mladost on 27 May 2000. He was also that year's Euroleague best scorer with 39 goals in the season. In 2001, VK Bečej made its last Champions League Final Four appearance. The club's president during this golden era was Đorđe "Badža" Predin. The prominent Serbian company Sojaprotein sponsored the club in this period. The club was dissolved in 2002 due to financial issues.

In the following years, PVK Bečej 2005 (founded in 2005) and water polo academy Bečejac (founded in 2007) were founded in the city and were later merged into VK Bečejac in 2010. Since the 2013–14 season, the club plays under name Bečej again. The club is playing in the national leagues of Serbia, without appearances in the European leagues.

== Rosters ==
=== Champions League winning squad ===
- Aleksandar Šoštar
- Slobodan Soro
- Predrag Zimonjić
- Goran Krstonošić
- Nenad Vukanić
- Nedeljko Rodić
- Branko Peković
- Aleksandar Ćirić
- Veljko Uskoković
- László Tóth
- István Mészáros
- Aleksandar Šapić
- Jugoslav Vasović
- Balázs Vincze
- Nebojša Milić
- Nenad Kačar

=== Notable former players ===
- Milan Tričković

=== Notable former coaches ===
- Vlaho Orlić
- Nikola Stamenić
- Zoltán Kásás
- Mirko Blažević

== Honours ==
- National Championship
  - Winners (6) : 1996, 1997, 1998, 1999, 2000 and 2001
- National Cup
  - Winners (6) : 1996, 1997, 1998, 1999, 2000 and 2001
- Champions League
  - Winners (1) : 1999/00
  - Final Four (3) : 1997, 1998, 2001
