= Predrag Zimonjić =

Serbian water polo player

Personal information
- Born: 15 October 1970 (age 55) Belgrade, SFR Yugoslavia
Medal record
Men's water polo
Representing Yugoslavia
Olympic Games
Bronze medal – third place	2000 Sydney	Team competition
World Championships
Silver medal – second place	2001 Fukuoka	Team competition
European Championships
Gold medal – first place	2001 Budapest	Team competition

Predrag Zimonjić (born 15 October 1970) is a Serbian water polo player who played for FR Yugoslavia at two consecutive Summer Olympics, starting in 1996.

== See also ==
- List of Olympic medalists in water polo (men)
- List of World Aquatics Championships medalists in water polo
