= Nenad Vukanić =

Serbian water polo player (born 1974)

Personal information
- Born: 16 May 1974 (age 52) Kotor, SFR Yugoslavia
Medal record
Men's water polo
Representing Yugoslavia
Olympic Games
Bronze medal – third place	2000 Sydney
FINA World Cup
Bronze medal – third place	2002 Belgrade
Mediterranean Games
Gold medal – first place	1997 Bari

Nenad Vukanić (born 16 May 1974 in Kotor) is a water polo player who played for FR Yugoslavia at the 2000 Summer Olympics.

== See also ==
- List of Olympic medalists in water polo (men)
- List of World Aquatics Championships medalists in water polo
