= Alen Bošković =

Croatian water polo player

Personal information
- Nationality: Croatian
- Born: 28 October 1971 (age 53); Dubrovnik, Yugoslavia

Sport
- Sport: Water polo

Alen Bošković (born 28 October 1971) is a Croatian water polo player. He competed in the men's tournament at the 2000 Summer Olympics.
