= Milan Tadić =

Serbian water polo player

Personal information
- Nationality: Serbian
- Born: 21 February 1970 (age 55)

Sport
- Sport: Water polo

Milan Tadić (born 21 February 1970) is a Serbian water polo player. He competed in the men's tournament at the 1996 Summer Olympics.

== See also ==
- Serbia and Montenegro men's Olympic water polo team records and statistics
- List of men's Olympic water polo tournament goalkeepers
