= 2005–06 LEN Euroleague =

Water polo sports season

- League: LEN Euroleague
- Sport: Water Polo
- Duration: 14 September 2005 to 20 May 2006
- Teams: 16 (preliminary round); 36 (total)

Final Four
- Finals champions: (Croatia) Jug Dubrovnik (3rd title)
- Runners-up: (Italy) Pro Recco
- Finals MVP: (Hungary) Márton Szívós (Pro Recco)

Euroleague seasons
- ← 2004–05 2006–07 →

The 2005–06 LEN Euroleague was the 43rd edition of LEN's premier competition for men's water polo clubs. It ran from 14 September 2005 to 20 May 2006, and it was contested by 36 teams. The Final Four (semifinals, final, and third place game) took place on May 19 and May 20 in Dubrovnik.

== Preliminary round ==
Location of teams of the 2005–06 LEN Euroleague group stage.
Red: Group A; Green: Group B; Blue: Group C; Yellow: Group D.

Key to colors in group tables
Group winners and runners-up advanced to the Quarter-finals

=== Group A ===
Team	Pld	W	D	L	GF	GA	GD	Pts
(Italy) Posillipo	6	5	0	1	60	48	+12	10
(Hungary) Honvéd	6	4	0	2	73	56	+17	8
(Croatia) HAVK Mladost	6	3	0	3	54	54	0	6
(Germany) Spandau 04	6	0	0	6	47	78	−31	0

=== Group B ===
Team	Pld	W	D	L	GF	GA	GD	Pts
(Croatia) Jug Dubrovnik	6	5	0	1	73	52	+21	10
(Hungary) Vasas	6	3	1	2	57	58	−1	7
(Greece) Olympiacos	6	2	1	3	54	61	−7	5
(France) Marseille	6	1	0	5	56	69	−13	2

=== Group C ===
Team	Pld	W	D	L	GF	GA	GD	Pts
(Italy) Savona	6	5	0	1	60	45	+15	10
(Serbia and Montenegro) Partizan	6	3	1	2	47	42	+5	7
(Greece) Ethnikos Piraeus	6	2	0	4	53	56	−3	4
(Spain) Barcelona	6	1	1	4	53	70	−17	3

=== Group D ===
Team	Pld	W	D	L	GF	GA	GD	Pts
(Italy) Pro Recco	6	5	0	1	67	45	+22	10
(Serbia and Montenegro) Jadran Herceg Novi	6	3	0	3	54	57	−3	6
(Russia) Šturm 2002	6	2	1	3	53	63	−10	5
(Spain) Atlètic-Barceloneta	6	1	1	4	45	54	−9	3

== Knockout stage ==
=== Quarter-finals ===
The first legs were played on 22 March, and the second legs were played on 19 April 2006.

Team 1	Agg.	Team 2	1st leg	2nd leg
Jadran Herceg Novi (Serbia and Montenegro)	15–15(1–4 p)	(Italy) Posillipo	5–7	10–8
Partizan (Serbia and Montenegro)	14–16	(Croatia) Jug Dubrovnik	9–7	5–9
Pro Recco (Italy)	23–15	(Hungary) Bp. Honvéd	11–8	12–7
Vasas (Hungary)	16–16(6–7 p)	(Italy) Savona	6–5	10–9

== Final Four ==
Bazen u Gružu, Dubrovnik, Croatia

Semifinals; 19 May 2006
(Italy) Savona	8
(Croatia) Jug Dubrovnik	9
(Italy) Posillipo	8
(Italy) Pro Recco (aet)	9

Final; 20 May 2006
(Croatia) Jug Dubrovnik	9
(Italy) Pro Recco	7
Third place
(Italy) Savona	8
(Italy) Posillipo	11

=== Final standings ===
	Team
	(Croatia) Jug Dubrovnik
Silver medal	(Italy) Pro Recco
Bronze medal	(Italy) Posillipo
	(Italy) Savona

2005–06 LEN Euroleague
Champions

Jug Dubrovnik
3rd Cup

=== Awards ===
Final four MVP
(Hungary) Márton Szívós (Pro Recco)

== See also ==
- 2005–06 LEN Trophy
