= POŠK =

Water polo team

- Official logo
- Founded: April 11, 1937; 89 years ago
- League: Croatian League; Regional League A2
- Based in: Split, Croatia

POŠK (POmorski Športski Klub: Marine Sports Club), is a professional water polo club based in Split, Croatia. The club was founded in 1937. As of 2026–27 season, it competes in the Croatian League and Regional League A2.

== History ==
The club developed in a big name in the world of water polo, especially from the 1980s onwards, during which the national championship of Yugoslavia have been lost many times in points after tough "battles" against the remaining giants of the erstwhile Yugoslav and European water polo as Mladost, Jug, Partizan and Primorac Kotor.

== Honours ==
=== European competitions ===
LEN Champions League

- Winners (1): 1998-99

LEN Cup Winners' Cup

- Winners (2): 1981–82, 1983–84
- Runners-up (1): 1979-80

LEN Super Cup

- Winners (1): 1984
- Runners-up (1): 1982

COMEN Cup

- Winners (3): 1984, 1985, 1985

=== Domestic competitions ===
Croatian League

- Winners (1): 1997-98

Croatian Cup

- Winners (1): 1999-00

Yugoslav Cup

- Winners (2): 1980, 1982–83
