= Francesco Postiglione =

Italian water polo player

Personal information
- Born: April 29, 1972 (age 54) Naples, Italy
Medal record
Men's water polo
Representing Italy
Olympic Games
Bronze medal – third place	1996 Atlanta	Team competition
World Championships
Silver medal – second place	2003 Barcelona	Team competition
FINA World League
Silver medal – second place	2003 New York	Team competition

Francesco Postiglione (born 29 April 1972) is a former swimmer and water polo player from Italy, who represented his native country at four Summer Olympics: 1992, 1996, 2000 and 2004. At his Olympic debut he competed as a breaststroke swimmer (1992). Four years later he claimed the bronze medal with the men's national team at the 1996 Summer Olympics in Atlanta, USA.

== See also ==
- List of Olympic medalists in water polo (men)
- List of World Aquatics Championships medalists in water polo
