= László Tóth (water polo) =

Hungarian water polo player

Personal information
- Nationality: Hungarian
- Born: 9 February 1968 (age 58) Szentes, Hungary

Sport
- Sport: Water polo
Medal record
Representing Hungary
World Championships
Bronze medal – third place	1991 Perth	Team competition
European Championships
Silver medal – second place	1993 Sheffield	Team competition
Bronze medal – third place	1995 Vienna	Team competition

László Tóth (born 9 February 1968) is a Hungarian former water polo player. He competed at the 1988 Summer Olympics, the 1992 Summer Olympics and the 1996 Summer Olympics.

== See also ==
- List of World Aquatics Championships medalists in water polo
