= Pino Porzio =

Italian water polo player

Personal information
- Born: 26 February 1967 (age 59) Naples, Italy
- Position: Coach and Italian former water polo player Italy

Career history
- Player career
- /: Posillipo Youth
- 1982–1998: Posillipo
- 1986–1994: Posillipo
- Coaching
- 1999–2000: Salerno
- 2000–2001: Bogliasco
- 2001–2003: Ortigia
- 2003–2005: Posillipo
- 2005–2012: Pro Recco
- 2023–: Posillipo

Giuseppe "Pino" Porzio (born 26 February 1967) is a coach and a former Italian water polo player. He is one of the most titled European coaches of all time, and, as his list of prizes demonstrates, is one of the most winning sportsmen among Italian athletes. He has won, both as a player and as a coach, 43 titles including: Olympics, World Cup, European Championships, World Championships, 2 Mediterranean Games, 7 Champions League, 3 European Super Cup, Adriatic League 1, 2 Comen Cup, 16 League titles, 7 Italian Championships.

== Playing career ==
For 16 years, from 1982 to 1998, he played in the top flight with the Posillipo with his brother Franco, winning almost everything: 8 Italian Championships, 2 LEN Champions Cup and LEN Cup Winners' Cup, with the national team won the Olympic gold medal in '92, won two editions of the Mediterranean Games in 1991 and in 1993, 1 European Championships in the 1993, World Cup in the 1993 and the 1 World Championships in 1994.

In the book "Nel nome del padre del figlio e dello sport" (finalist for the Bancarella 2013 award) dedicated to the great families of Italian sport, the journalist Franco Esposito writes about Pino Porzio as "a tactical leader, the organizer of the defence. A Beckenbauer of water polo. Knowing, timely and decisive with his shot hurts your opponents. "

His brother Franco says: "Pino is apparently thoughtful, cold, calculating but basically it's a mask... We believe in the group, in the union of men."

== Coaching ==
Pino Porzio confirms his talent as a coach, winning the championship in 2003-2004 and the European Cup in 2004–2005 with the 'Posillipo Team' before switching to Pro Recco in 2005, where he won 7 Italian Championships, 4 Champions League, 6 Italy Cups, 3 European Super Cups and 1 Adriatic League. On 6 June 2012, he resigned as manager of the recchelina team.

"Giuseppe Porzio wins everything, absolutely everything.'s Victory is a gift of nature. A matter of DNA. Pacato and thoughtful, Pino Porzio is born coach. Takes from all: De Crescenzo, Dennerlein, Rudic." From teachers Marsili Mino and Mino Cacace."

He is currently coaching under a temporary contract with Water Polo Canada (January–April 2016).

== Record ==
Pino Porzio won, both as a player and as a coach, 43 titles, including: Olympics, World Cup, European Championships, World Championships, 2 Mediterranean Games, 7 Champions League, 3 European Super Cup, Adriatic League 1, 2 Comen Cup, 16 League titles, 7 Italian Championships.

- Join 10 finals of the Champions League, including 8 consecutive finals as coach
- Only one to win European Championships and LEN Euroleague Champions League
- In addition, only one to win a total of 7 European Cup / Euroleague / LEN Champions League and titled clubs in Europe: Partizan, Pro Recco and Mladost
- 3 grand slam (European Cup / UEFA Super Cup / Shield / Cup Italy) 2007–2008–2010
- 21 final championships (16 wins)
- 2004/2012 In these nine years before driving the Posillipo and then Pro Recco in the final of all competitions: 28 of 28, with 23 wins.

== Palmarès ==
=== Playing career ===
- Olympic gold medals - Barcellona 1992
- World Cup gold medals - Roma 1994
- European Cup gold medals - Sheffield 1993
- 2 Mediterranean Games - Gold medals - Atene 1991 / Canet en Roussillon 1993
- 8 Italian Cups - Posillipo: 1984–85, 1985–86, 1987–88, 1988–89, 1992–93, 1993–94, 1994–95, 1995–96
- Champions League/Euroleague - Posillipo: 1996–97, 1997–98
- LEN Cup Winners' Cup - Posillipo: 1987–88

=== Coaching ===
- 2 COMEN Cups: Ortigia: 2001–02, 2002–03
- 8 Italian Cups: Posillipo: 2003-04 / Recco: 2005–06, 2006–07, 2007–08, 2008–09, 2009–10, 2010–11, 2011–12
- 6 Italian League Cups: Recco: 2005–06, 2006–07, 2007–08, 2008–09, 2009–10, 2010–11
- 5 Champions League/Euroleague: Posillipo: 2004-05 / Recco: 2006–07, 2007–08, 2009–10, 2011–12
- 3 European Super Cups: Recco: 2007, 2008, 2010
- 1 Adriatic League: Recco: 2011-2012

== See also ==
- Italy men's Olympic water polo team records and statistics
- List of Olympic champions in men's water polo
- List of Olympic medalists in water polo (men)
- List of world champions in men's water polo
- List of World Aquatics Championships medalists in water polo
