= 2017–18 LEN Champions League preliminary round =

This article describes the group stage of the 2017–18 LEN Champions League.

== Format ==
16 teams were drawn into two groups (Group A and Group B) of eight teams. Teams play against each other home-and-away in a round-robin format.

== Group A ==
Pos	Team	Pld	W	D	L	GF	GA	GD	Pts	Qualification
1	(Greece) Olympiacos	14	12	1	1	153	102	+51	37	Final Eight
2	(Croatia) Jug CO	14	9	1	4	147	113	+34	28	Final Eight
3	(Spain) CNA Barceloneta	14	8	3	3	137	102	+35	27	Final Eight
4	(Italy) AN Brescia	14	8	2	4	114	106	+8	26	Final Eight
5	(Russia) Dynamo Moscow	14	6	4	4	141	133	+8	22	
6	(Germany) Waspo 98 Hannover	14	4	0	10	133	150	−17	12	
7	(Hungary) Orvosegyetem SC	14	3	1	10	103	126	−23	10	
8	(Serbia) Partizan	14	0	0	14	91	187	−96	0	

Source: LEN

All times are local

=== Matchday 1 ===
==== Partizan vs. Orvosegyetem SC ====
25 October 2017; 17:30	Report	Partizan (Serbia)	7–11	(Hungary) Orvosegyetem SC	Belgrade
25 October 2017; 17:30	Report	Score by quarters: 2–4, 2–2, 2–1, 1–4			Belgrade
25 October 2017; 17:30	Report	Radanović 3	Goals	Erdélyi 4	Belgrade

==== Dynamo Moscow vs. Jug CO ====
25 October 2017; 19:15	Report	Dynamo Moscow (Russia)	12–11	(Croatia) Jug CO	Moscow; Referees: Schwartz (ISR), Putniković (SRB)
25 October 2017; 19:15	Report	Score by quarters: 1–2, 3–5, 4–2, 4–2			Moscow; Referees: Schwartz (ISR), Putniković (SRB)
25 October 2017; 19:15	Report	Nagaev 3	Goals	Benić 4	Moscow; Referees: Schwartz (ISR), Putniković (SRB)

==== CNA Barceloneta vs. Olympiacos ====
25 October 2017; 19:30	Report	CNA Barceloneta (Spain)	7–7	(Greece) Olympiacos	Barcelona; Referees: Voevodin (RUS), Margeta (SLO)
25 October 2017; 19:30	Report	Score by quarters: 1–1, 2–1, 1–1, 3–4			Barcelona; Referees: Voevodin (RUS), Margeta (SLO)
25 October 2017; 19:30	Report	Mallarach 3	Goals	Dervisis, Mourikis 2	Barcelona; Referees: Voevodin (RUS), Margeta (SLO)

==== Waspo 98 Hannover vs. AN Brescia ====
25 October 2017; 19:30	Report	Waspo 98 Hannover (Germany)	8–6	(Italy) AN Brescia	Hannover; Referees: Teixido (ESP), Peris (CRO)
25 October 2017; 19:30	Report	Score by quarters: 3–1, 2–1, 0–2, 3–2			Hannover; Referees: Teixido (ESP), Peris (CRO)
25 October 2017; 19:30	Report	three players 2	Goals	C. Presciutti, Rizzo 2	Hannover; Referees: Teixido (ESP), Peris (CRO)

=== Matchday 2 ===
==== Jug CO vs. Partizan ====
8 November 2017; 18:15	Report	Jug CO (Croatia)	16–5	(Serbia) Partizan	Dubrovnik; Referees: Galkin (RUS), Paoletti (ITA)
8 November 2017; 18:15	Report	Score by quarters: 3–0, 2–1, 6–2, 5–2			Dubrovnik; Referees: Galkin (RUS), Paoletti (ITA)
8 November 2017; 18:15	Report	Renzuto Iodice, Lozina 4	Goals	Andrejević 2	Dubrovnik; Referees: Galkin (RUS), Paoletti (ITA)

==== Olympiacos vs. Dynamo Moscow ====
8 November 2017; 19:30	Report	Olympiacos (Greece)	17–9	(Russia) Dynamo Moscow	Athens; Referees: Buch (ESP), Abramović (MNE)
8 November 2017; 19:30	Report	Score by quarters: 7–1, 5–3, 3–2, 2–3			Athens; Referees: Buch (ESP), Abramović (MNE)
8 November 2017; 19:30	Report	Genidounias, Obradović 4	Goals	Bychkov 3	Athens; Referees: Buch (ESP), Abramović (MNE)

==== Orvosegyetem SC vs. Waspo 98 Hannover ====
8 November 2017; 20:30	Report	Orvosegyetem SC (Hungary)	8–7	(Germany) Waspo 98 Hannover	Budapest; Referees: Stanojević (SRB), Tiozzo (CRO)
8 November 2017; 20:30	Report	Score by quarters: 2–2, 1–2, 2–1, 3–2			Budapest; Referees: Stanojević (SRB), Tiozzo (CRO)
8 November 2017; 20:30	Report	Dr. Brguljan 3	Goals	Da. Brguljan 4	Budapest; Referees: Stanojević (SRB), Tiozzo (CRO)

==== AN Brescia vs. CNA Barceloneta ====
8 November 2017; 20:30	Report	AN Brescia (Italy)	6–5	(Spain) CNA Barceloneta	Brescia; Referees: Stavridis (GRE), Manea (ROU)
8 November 2017; 20:30	Report	Score by quarters: 2–1, 1–2, 1–0, 2–2			Brescia; Referees: Stavridis (GRE), Manea (ROU)
8 November 2017; 20:30	Report	Nora 2	Goals	Perrone 2	Brescia; Referees: Stavridis (GRE), Manea (ROU)

=== Matchday 3 ===
==== Waspo 98 Hannover vs. Jug CO ====
29 November 2017; 18:30	Report	Waspo 98 Hannover (Germany)	6–13	(Croatia) Jug CO	Hannover; Referees: Naumov (RUS), Alexandrescu (ROU)
29 November 2017; 18:30	Report	Score by quarters: 3–4, 1–4, 1–0, 1–5			Hannover; Referees: Naumov (RUS), Alexandrescu (ROU)
29 November 2017; 18:30	Report	Radović 3	Goals	Joković 3	Hannover; Referees: Naumov (RUS), Alexandrescu (ROU)

==== Partizan vs. Dynamo Moscow ====
29 November 2017; 18:30	Report	Partizan (Serbia)	10–14	(Russia) Dynamo Moscow	Belgrade
29 November 2017; 18:30	Report	Score by quarters: 2–2, 3–4, 4–4, 1–4			Belgrade
29 November 2017; 18:30	Report	F. Janković 2	Goals	Kholod 3	Belgrade

==== CNA Barceloneta vs. Orvosegyetem SC ====
29 November 2017; 19:15	Report	CNA Barceloneta (Spain)	12–6	(Hungary) Orvosegyetem SC	Barcelona; Referees: Stavridis (GRE), Schwartz (ISR)
29 November 2017; 19:15	Report	Score by quarters: 2–1, 4–1, 3–0, 3–4			Barcelona; Referees: Stavridis (GRE), Schwartz (ISR)
29 November 2017; 19:15	Report	Munarriz 4	Goals	six players 1	Barcelona; Referees: Stavridis (GRE), Schwartz (ISR)

==== AN Brescia vs. Olympiacos ====
29 November 2017; 20:30	Report	AN Brescia (Italy)	6–7	(Greece) Olympiacos	Brescia; Referees: Margeta (SLO), Ohme (GER)
29 November 2017; 20:30	Report	Score by quarters: 0–2, 3–1, 2–1, 1–3			Brescia; Referees: Margeta (SLO), Ohme (GER)
29 November 2017; 20:30	Report	Rizzo 2	Goals	Obradović 3	Brescia; Referees: Margeta (SLO), Ohme (GER)

=== Matchday 4 ===
==== Olympiacos vs. Partizan ====
9 December 2017; 17:30	Report	Olympiacos (Greece)	16–8	(Serbia) Partizan	Athens; Referees: Colombo (ITA), Jiménez (ESP)
9 December 2017; 17:30	Report	Score by quarters: 5–1, 4–2, 3–4, 4–1			Athens; Referees: Colombo (ITA), Jiménez (ESP)
9 December 2017; 17:30	Report	Fountoulis, Gounas 3	Goals	Tomić, Radonjić 2	Athens; Referees: Colombo (ITA), Jiménez (ESP)

==== Dynamo Moscow vs. Waspo 98 Hannover ====
9 December 2017; 19:15	Report	Dynamo Moscow (Russia)	9–6	(Germany) Waspo 98 Hannover	Moscow; Referees: Margeta (SLO), Buch (ESP)
9 December 2017; 19:15	Report	Score by quarters: 3–2, 2–2, 2–1, 2–1			Moscow; Referees: Margeta (SLO), Buch (ESP)
9 December 2017; 19:15	Report	Nagaev 3	Goals	Brguljan 3	Moscow; Referees: Margeta (SLO), Buch (ESP)

==== Jug CO vs. CNA Barceloneta ====
9 December 2017; 18:30	Report	Jug CO (Croatia)	9–9	(Spain) CNA Barceloneta	Dubrovnik; Referees: Molnár (HUN), Severo (ITA)
9 December 2017; 18:30	Report	Score by quarters: 5–1, 2–3, 1–2, 1–3			Dubrovnik; Referees: Molnár (HUN), Severo (ITA)
9 December 2017; 18:30	Report	Lončar, Joković 2	Goals	Munarriz, Mallarach 2	Dubrovnik; Referees: Molnár (HUN), Severo (ITA)

==== Orvosegyetem SC vs. AN Brescia ====
9 December 2017; 20:30	Report	Orvosegyetem SC (Hungary)	6–8	(Italy) AN Brescia	Budapest; Referees: Dervieux (FRA), Stavridis (GRE)
9 December 2017; 20:30	Report	Score by quarters: 1–1, 3–2, 0–2, 2–3			Budapest; Referees: Dervieux (FRA), Stavridis (GRE)
9 December 2017; 20:30	Report	six players 1	Goals	three players 2	Budapest; Referees: Dervieux (FRA), Stavridis (GRE)

=== Matchday 5 ===
==== Waspo 98 Hannover vs. Partizan ====
20 December 2017; 18:30	Report	Waspo 98 Hannover (Germany)	16–6	(Serbia) Partizan	Hannover; Referees: Birakis (GRE), Golikov (RUS)
20 December 2017; 18:30	Report	Score by quarters: 5–2, 4–0, 4–2, 3–2			Hannover; Referees: Birakis (GRE), Golikov (RUS)
20 December 2017; 18:30	Report	Radović 6	Goals	Vučinić, Andrejević 2	Hannover; Referees: Birakis (GRE), Golikov (RUS)

==== Orvosegyetem SC vs. Olympiacos ====
20 December 2017; 18:30	Report	Orvosegyetem SC (Hungary)	6–10	(Greece) Olympiacos	Budapest; Referees: Teixido (ESP), Severo (ITA)
20 December 2017; 18:30	Report	Score by quarters: 2–3, 1–2, 2–4, 1–1			Budapest; Referees: Teixido (ESP), Severo (ITA)
20 December 2017; 18:30	Report	Salamon 3	Goals	Genidounias 3	Budapest; Referees: Teixido (ESP), Severo (ITA)

==== CNA Barceloneta vs. Dynamo Moscow ====
20 December 2017; 19:00	Report	CNA Barceloneta (Spain)	7–7	(Russia) Dynamo Moscow	Barcelona; Referees: Stavridis (GRE), Peris (CRO)
20 December 2017; 19:00	Report	Score by quarters: 1–3, 2–2, 3–0, 1–2			Barcelona; Referees: Stavridis (GRE), Peris (CRO)
20 December 2017; 19:00	Report	Munarriz, Mallarach 3	Goals	Lazarev 4	Barcelona; Referees: Stavridis (GRE), Peris (CRO)

==== AN Brescia vs. Jug CO ====
20 December 2017; 20:30	Report	AN Brescia (Italy)	9–8	(Croatia) Jug CO	Brescia; Referees: Putniković (SRB), Sadekov (RUS)
20 December 2017; 20:30	Report	Score by quarters: 2–2, 4–1, 1–3, 2–2			Brescia; Referees: Putniković (SRB), Sadekov (RUS)
20 December 2017; 20:30	Report	Janović 3	Goals	Renzuto Iodice 3	Brescia; Referees: Putniković (SRB), Sadekov (RUS)

=== Matchday 6 ===
==== Dynamo Moscow vs. AN Brescia ====
13 January 2018; 19:15	Report	Dynamo Moscow (Russia)	9–9	(Italy) AN Brescia	Moscow; Referees: Schwartz (ISR), Teixido (ESP)
13 January 2018; 19:15	Report	Score by quarters: 2–2, 2–2, 2–1, 3–4			Moscow; Referees: Schwartz (ISR), Teixido (ESP)
13 January 2018; 19:15	Report	Shepelev 2	Goals	Muslim 2	Moscow; Referees: Schwartz (ISR), Teixido (ESP)

==== Jug CO vs. Orvosegyetem SC ====
13 January 2018; 18:30	Report	Jug CO (Croatia)	12–10	(Hungary) Orvosegyetem SC	Dubrovnik; Referees: Colombo (ITA), Stavridis (GRE)
13 January 2018; 18:30	Report	Score by quarters: 4–2, 3–2, 2–2, 3–4			Dubrovnik; Referees: Colombo (ITA), Stavridis (GRE)
13 January 2018; 18:30	Report	Renzuto Iodice, Benić 3	Goals	Seman 3	Dubrovnik; Referees: Colombo (ITA), Stavridis (GRE)

==== Partizan vs. CNA Barceloneta ====
13 January 2018; 18:30	Report	Partizan (Serbia)	5–15	(Spain) CNA Barceloneta	Belgrade; Referees: Achladiotis (GRE), Seidel (GER)
13 January 2018; 18:30	Report	Score by quarters: 2–4, 1–3, 1–5, 1–3			Belgrade; Referees: Achladiotis (GRE), Seidel (GER)
13 January 2018; 18:30	Report	Radonjić 2	Goals	Famera, Perrone 3	Belgrade; Referees: Achladiotis (GRE), Seidel (GER)

==== Olympiacos vs. Waspo 98 Hannover ====
13 January 2018; 20:30	Report	Olympiacos (Greece)	11–7	(Germany) Waspo 98 Hannover	Athens; Referees: Margeta (SLO), Dervieux (FRA)
13 January 2018; 20:30	Report	Score by quarters: 3–0, 3–0, 1–3, 4–4			Athens; Referees: Margeta (SLO), Dervieux (FRA)
13 January 2018; 20:30	Report	Genidounias, Fountoulis 2	Goals	Brguljan 2	Athens; Referees: Margeta (SLO), Dervieux (FRA)

=== Matchday 7 ===
==== Olympiacos vs. Jug CO ====
24 January 2018; 17:00	Report	Olympiacos (Greece)	8–6	(Croatia) Jug CO	Athens; Referees: Severo (ITA), Teixido (ESP)
24 January 2018; 17:00	Report	Score by quarters: 3–0, 1–2, 2–2, 2–2			Athens; Referees: Severo (ITA), Teixido (ESP)
24 January 2018; 17:00	Report	three players 2	Goals	Renzuto Iodice 3	Athens; Referees: Severo (ITA), Teixido (ESP)

==== Orvosegyetem SC vs. Dynamo Moscow ====
24 January 2018; 18:30	Report	Orvosegyetem SC (Hungary)	5–10	(Russia) Dynamo Moscow	Budapest; Referees: Buch (ESP), Margeta (SLO)
24 January 2018; 18:30	Report	Score by quarters: 1–3, 0–3, 1–2, 3–2			Budapest; Referees: Buch (ESP), Margeta (SLO)
24 January 2018; 18:30	Report	Seman 2	Goals	four players 2	Budapest; Referees: Buch (ESP), Margeta (SLO)

==== AN Brescia vs. Partizan ====
24 January 2018; 20:30	Report	AN Brescia (Italy)	13–9	(Serbia) Partizan	Brescia; Referees: Dervieux (FRA), Mustata (ROU)
24 January 2018; 20:30	Report	Score by quarters: 7–0, 2–2, 2–3, 2–4			Brescia; Referees: Dervieux (FRA), Mustata (ROU)
24 January 2018; 20:30	Report	five players 2	Goals	M. Janković	Brescia; Referees: Dervieux (FRA), Mustata (ROU)

==== CNA Barceloneta vs. Waspo 98 Hannover ====
25 January 2018; 19:15	Report	CNA Barceloneta (Spain)	13–12	(Germany) Waspo 98 Hannover	Barcelona; Referees: Ivanovski (MNE), Voevodin (RUS)
25 January 2018; 19:15	Report	Score by quarters: 2–2, 4–4, 3–2, 4–4			Barcelona; Referees: Ivanovski (MNE), Voevodin (RUS)
25 January 2018; 19:15	Report	three players 3	Goals	Brguljan 6	Barcelona; Referees: Ivanovski (MNE), Voevodin (RUS)

=== Matchday 8 ===
==== Dynamo Moscow vs. Orvosegyetem SC ====
7 February 2018; 19:15	Report	Dynamo Moscow (Russia)	7–7	(Hungary) Orvosegyetem SC	Moscow; Referees: Schwartz (ISR), Stanojević (SRB)
7 February 2018; 19:15	Report	Score by quarters: 1–2, 1–1, 2–2, 3–2			Moscow; Referees: Schwartz (ISR), Stanojević (SRB)
7 February 2018; 19:15	Report	three players 2	Goals	Seman 2	Moscow; Referees: Schwartz (ISR), Stanojević (SRB)

==== Waspo 98 Hannover vs. CNA Barceloneta ====
7 February 2018; 18:30	Report	Waspo 98 Hannover (Germany)	7–13	(Spain) CNA Barceloneta	Hannover; Referees: Stavridis (GRE), Paoletti (ITA)
7 February 2018; 18:30	Report	Score by quarters: 2–4, 3–5, 0–3, 2–1			Hannover; Referees: Stavridis (GRE), Paoletti (ITA)
7 February 2018; 18:30	Report	Radović 3	Goals	Granados, Munarriz 3	Hannover; Referees: Stavridis (GRE), Paoletti (ITA)

==== Partizan vs. AN Brescia ====
7 February 2018; 18:30	Report	Partizan (Serbia)	3–8	(Italy) AN Brescia	Belgrade; Referees: Golikov (RUS), Manea (ROU)
7 February 2018; 18:30	Report	Score by quarters: 1–1, 0–1, 1–3, 1–3			Belgrade; Referees: Golikov (RUS), Manea (ROU)
7 February 2018; 18:30	Report	Radanović 2	Goals	Pasković, Janović 2	Belgrade; Referees: Golikov (RUS), Manea (ROU)

==== Jug CO vs. Olympiacos ====
7 February 2018; 18:30	Report	Jug CO (Croatia)	10–8	(Greece) Olympiacos	Dubrovnik; Referees: Buch (ESP), Alexandrescu (ROU)
7 February 2018; 18:30	Report	Score by quarters: 4–2, 2–1, 2–3, 2–2			Dubrovnik; Referees: Buch (ESP), Alexandrescu (ROU)
7 February 2018; 18:30	Report	Joković 3	Goals	Fountoulis, Bušlje 2	Dubrovnik; Referees: Buch (ESP), Alexandrescu (ROU)

=== Matchday 9 ===
==== Waspo 98 Hannover vs. Olympiacos ====
28 February 2018; 17:30	Report	Waspo 98 Hannover (Germany)	7–12	(Greece) Olympiacos	Hannover; Referees: Severo (ITA), Marosvári (HUN)
28 February 2018; 17:30	Report	Score by quarters: 1–3, 2–1, 2–4, 2–4			Hannover; Referees: Severo (ITA), Marosvári (HUN)
28 February 2018; 17:30	Report	Real 2	Goals	Fountoulis 3	Hannover; Referees: Severo (ITA), Marosvári (HUN)

==== CNA Barceloneta vs. Partizan ====
28 February 2018; 19:15	Report	CNA Barceloneta (Spain)	16–5	(Serbia) Partizan	Barcelona; Referees: Kun (HUN), Butz (NED)
28 February 2018; 19:15	Report	Score by quarters: 4–2, 2–2, 6–1, 4–0			Barcelona; Referees: Kun (HUN), Butz (NED)
28 February 2018; 19:15	Report	Perrone, Mallarach 3	Goals	five players 1	Barcelona; Referees: Kun (HUN), Butz (NED)

==== AN Brescia vs. Dynamo Moscow ====
28 February 2018; 20:30	Report	AN Brescia (Italy)	9–9	(Russia) Dynamo Moscow	Brescia; Referees: Margeta (SLO), Stavridis (GRE)
28 February 2018; 20:30	Report	Score by quarters: 3–3, 2–2, 2–3, 2–1			Brescia; Referees: Margeta (SLO), Stavridis (GRE)
28 February 2018; 20:30	Report	C. Presciutti 3	Goals	Latypov, Kholod 2	Brescia; Referees: Margeta (SLO), Stavridis (GRE)

==== Orvosegyetem SC vs. Jug CO ====
28 February 2018; 20:30	Report	Orvosegyetem SC (Hungary)	4–7	(Croatia) Jug CO	Budapest; Referees: Teixido (ESP), Koryzna (POL)
28 February 2018; 20:30	Report	Score by quarters: 2–2, 1–2, 1–2, 0–1			Budapest; Referees: Teixido (ESP), Koryzna (POL)
28 February 2018; 20:30	Report	Erdélyi 3	Goals	Fatović 4	Budapest; Referees: Teixido (ESP), Koryzna (POL)

=== Matchday 10 ===
==== Olympiacos vs. Orvosegyetem SC ====
14 March 2018; 17:30	Report	Olympiacos (Greece)	10–7	(Hungary) Orvosegyetem SC	Athens; Referees: Radičević (CRO), Voevodin (RUS)
14 March 2018; 17:30	Report	Score by quarters: 4–0, 3–1, 2–3, 1–3			Athens; Referees: Radičević (CRO), Voevodin (RUS)
14 March 2018; 17:30	Report	three players 2	Goals	Seman, Erdélyi 2	Athens; Referees: Radičević (CRO), Voevodin (RUS)

==== Dynamo Moscow vs. CNA Barceloneta ====
14 March 2018; 19:15	Report	Dynamo Moscow (Russia)	5–9	(Spain) CNA Barceloneta	Moscow; Referees: Alexandrescu (ROU), Koryzna (POL)
14 March 2018; 19:15	Report	Score by quarters: 1–1, 1–2, 1–4, 2–2			Moscow; Referees: Alexandrescu (ROU), Koryzna (POL)
14 March 2018; 19:15	Report	Nagaev 2	Goals	Munarriz 3	Moscow; Referees: Alexandrescu (ROU), Koryzna (POL)

==== Partizan vs. Waspo 98 Hannover ====
14 March 2018; 18:30	Report	Partizan (Serbia)	11–15	(Germany) Waspo 98 Hannover	Belgrade; Referees: Navarra (ITA), Achladiotis (GRE)
14 March 2018; 18:30	Report	Score by quarters: 3–2, 2–5, 2–4, 4–4			Belgrade; Referees: Navarra (ITA), Achladiotis (GRE)
14 March 2018; 18:30	Report	four players 2	Goals	Brguljan 4	Belgrade; Referees: Navarra (ITA), Achladiotis (GRE)

==== Jug CO vs. AN Brescia ====
14 March 2018; 18:30	Report	Jug CO (Croatia)	10–7	(Italy) AN Brescia	Dubrovnik; Referees: Stavridis (GRE), Naumov (RUS)
14 March 2018; 18:30	Report	Score by quarters: 1–1, 5–2, 1–1, 3–3			Dubrovnik; Referees: Stavridis (GRE), Naumov (RUS)
14 March 2018; 18:30	Report	Lončar 3	Goals	Janović, Vukčević 2	Dubrovnik; Referees: Stavridis (GRE), Naumov (RUS)

=== Matchday 11 ===
==== CNA Barceloneta vs. Jug CO ====
31 March 2018; 11:45	Report	CNA Barceloneta (Spain)	8–6	(Croatia) Jug CO	Barcelona; Referees: Golikov (RUS), Stavridis (GRE)
31 March 2018; 11:45	Report	Score by quarters: 3–2, 1–2, 2–0, 2–2			Barcelona; Referees: Golikov (RUS), Stavridis (GRE)
31 March 2018; 11:45	Report	eight players 1	Goals	Fatović, Benić 2	Barcelona; Referees: Golikov (RUS), Stavridis (GRE)

==== Partizan vs. Olympiacos ====
31 March 2018; 18:30	Report	Partizan (Serbia)	4–7	(Greece) Olympiacos	Belgrade; Referees: Colombo (ITA), Gerzanich (RUS)
31 March 2018; 18:30	Report	Score by quarters: 0–2, 0–1, 1–1, 3–3			Belgrade; Referees: Colombo (ITA), Gerzanich (RUS)
31 March 2018; 18:30	Report	four players 1	Goals	Dervisis 3	Belgrade; Referees: Colombo (ITA), Gerzanich (RUS)

==== Waspo 98 Hannover vs. Dynamo Moscow ====
31 March 2018; 19:30	Report	Waspo 98 Hannover (Germany)	11–15	(Russia) Dynamo Moscow	Hannover; Referees: Birakis (GRE), Paoletti (ITA)
31 March 2018; 19:30	Report	Score by quarters: 2–2, 2–5, 3–3, 4–5			Hannover; Referees: Birakis (GRE), Paoletti (ITA)
31 March 2018; 19:30	Report	Brguljan 5	Goals	three players 3	Hannover; Referees: Birakis (GRE), Paoletti (ITA)

==== AN Brescia vs. Orvosegyetem SC ====
31 March 2018; 20:30	Report	AN Brescia (Italy)	9–5	(Hungary) Orvosegyetem SC	Brescia; Referees: Naumov (RUS), Raković (SRB)
31 March 2018; 20:30	Report	Score by quarters: 2–1, 3–1, 1–1, 3–2			Brescia; Referees: Naumov (RUS), Raković (SRB)
31 March 2018; 20:30	Report	N. Presciutti 3	Goals	Kovács 3	Brescia; Referees: Naumov (RUS), Raković (SRB)

=== Matchday 12 ===
==== Dynamo Moscow vs. Partizan ====
18 April 2018; 19:15	Report	Dynamo Moscow (Russia)	16–4	(Serbia) Partizan	Moscow; Referees: Seidel (GER), Manea (ROU)
18 April 2018; 19:15	Report	Score by quarters: 3–0, 4–2, 5–0, 4–2			Moscow; Referees: Seidel (GER), Manea (ROU)
18 April 2018; 19:15	Report	three players 4	Goals	four players 1	Moscow; Referees: Seidel (GER), Manea (ROU)

==== Olympiacos vs. AN Brescia ====
18 April 2018; 18:45	Report	Olympiacos (Greece)	13–6	(Italy) AN Brescia	Athens; Referees: Buch (ESP), Putniković (SRB)
18 April 2018; 18:45	Report	Score by quarters: 4–2, 3–0, 4–2, 2–2			Athens; Referees: Buch (ESP), Putniković (SRB)
18 April 2018; 18:45	Report	Genidounias 6	Goals	Pasković 2	Athens; Referees: Buch (ESP), Putniković (SRB)

==== Orvosegyetem SC vs. CNA Barceloneta ====
18 April 2018; 18:30	Report	Orvosegyetem SC (Hungary)	6–8	(Spain) CNA Barceloneta	Budapest; Referees: Margeta (SLO), Peris (CRO)
18 April 2018; 18:30	Report	Score by quarters: 1–4, 1–0, 1–3, 3–1			Budapest; Referees: Margeta (SLO), Peris (CRO)
18 April 2018; 18:30	Report	Salamon 3	Goals	Tahull, Mallarach 2	Budapest; Referees: Margeta (SLO), Peris (CRO)

==== Jug CO vs. Waspo 98 Hannover ====
18 April 2018; 18:30	Report	Jug CO (Croatia)	14–9	(Germany) Waspo 98 Hannover	Dubrovnik; Referees: Birakis (GRE), Severo (ITA)
18 April 2018; 18:30	Report	Score by quarters: 4–1, 3–2, 4–5, 3–1			Dubrovnik; Referees: Birakis (GRE), Severo (ITA)
18 April 2018; 18:30	Report	Joković 4	Goals	Real 3	Dubrovnik; Referees: Birakis (GRE), Severo (ITA)

=== Matchday 13 ===
==== CNA Barceloneta vs. AN Brescia ====
28 April 2018; 12:00	Report	CNA Barceloneta (Spain)	5–7	(Italy) AN Brescia	Barcelona; Referees: Schwartz (ISR), Koryzna (POL)
28 April 2018; 12:00	Report	Score by quarters: 0–2, 2–2, 3–2, 0–1			Barcelona; Referees: Schwartz (ISR), Koryzna (POL)
28 April 2018; 12:00	Report	Munarriz, Perrone 2	Goals	Muslim, Nora 2	Barcelona; Referees: Schwartz (ISR), Koryzna (POL)

==== Dynamo Moscow vs. Olympiacos ====
28 April 2018; 19:15	Report	Dynamo Moscow (Russia)	9–13	(Greece) Olympiacos	Moscow; Referees: Margeta (SLO), Molnár (HUN)
28 April 2018; 19:15	Report	Score by quarters: 3–1, 2–3, 3–5, 1–4			Moscow; Referees: Margeta (SLO), Molnár (HUN)
28 April 2018; 19:15	Report	three players 2	Goals	Genidounias, Obradović 3	Moscow; Referees: Margeta (SLO), Molnár (HUN)

==== Partizan vs. Jug CO ====
28 April 2018; 18:30	Report	Partizan (Serbia)	8–10	(Croatia) Jug CO	Belgrade; Referees: Jiménez (ESP), Mercier (FRA)
28 April 2018; 18:30	Report	Score by quarters: 2–2, 2–4, 1–2, 3–2			Belgrade; Referees: Jiménez (ESP), Mercier (FRA)
28 April 2018; 18:30	Report	three players 2	Goals	Joković 3	Belgrade; Referees: Jiménez (ESP), Mercier (FRA)

==== Waspo 98 Hannover vs. Orvosegyetem SC ====
30 April 2018; 19:30	Report	Waspo 98 Hannover (Germany)	13–8	(Hungary) Orvosegyetem SC	Hannover; Referees: Severo (ITA), Radičević (CRO)
30 April 2018; 19:30	Report	Score by quarters: 3–2, 4–2, 2–2, 4–2			Hannover; Referees: Severo (ITA), Radičević (CRO)
30 April 2018; 19:30	Report	Brguljan 5	Goals	Seman 2	Hannover; Referees: Severo (ITA), Radičević (CRO)

=== Matchday 14 ===
==== Olympiacos vs. CNA Barceloneta ====
9 May 2018; 17:30	Report	Olympiacos (Greece)	14–10	(Spain) CNA Barceloneta	Athens; Referees: Peris (CRO), Marosvári (HUN)
9 May 2018; 17:30	Report	Score by quarters: 4–2, 2–3, 5–3, 3–2			Athens; Referees: Peris (CRO), Marosvári (HUN)
9 May 2018; 17:30	Report	Genidounias 3	Goals	Munarriz 3	Athens; Referees: Peris (CRO), Marosvári (HUN)

==== Orvosegyetem SC vs. Partizan ====
9 May 2018; 18:30	Report	Orvosegyetem SC (Hungary)	14–6	(Serbia) Partizan	Budapest; Referees: Ohme (GER), Manea (ROU)
9 May 2018; 18:30	Report	Score by quarters: 3–0, 2–3, 5–3, 4–0			Budapest; Referees: Ohme (GER), Manea (ROU)
9 May 2018; 18:30	Report	Ubović 3	Goals	Andrejević, Aksentijević 2	Budapest; Referees: Ohme (GER), Manea (ROU)

==== AN Brescia vs. Waspo 98 Hannover ====
9 May 2018; 20:00	Report	AN Brescia (Italy)	11–9	(Germany) Waspo 98 Hannover	Brescia; Referees: Stavridis (GRE), Alexandrescu (ROU)
9 May 2018; 20:00	Report	Score by quarters: 4–1, 2–3, 3–3, 2–2			Brescia; Referees: Stavridis (GRE), Alexandrescu (ROU)
9 May 2018; 20:00	Report	Muslim 4	Goals	Real 3	Brescia; Referees: Stavridis (GRE), Alexandrescu (ROU)

==== Jug CO vs. Dynamo Moscow ====
9 May 2018	Report	Jug CO (Croatia)	15–10	(Russia) Dynamo Moscow	Dubrovnik
9 May 2018	Report	Score by quarters: 2–2, 4–2, 6–5, 3–1			Dubrovnik
9 May 2018	Report	Fatović, Benić 3	Goals	Pijetlović, Rađen 2	Dubrovnik

== Group B ==
Pos	Team	Pld	W	D	L	GF	GA	GD	Pts	Qualification
1	(Italy) Pro Recco	14	13	0	1	186	80	+106	39	Final Eight
2	(Hungary) ZF Eger	14	10	1	3	134	87	+47	31	Final Eight
3	(Hungary) Szolnoki VSC	14	10	0	4	169	99	+70	30	Final Eight
4	(Germany) Spandau 04	14	8	1	5	133	125	+8	25	Final Eight
5	(Montenegro) Jadran Carine	14	6	2	6	128	126	+2	20	
6	(Romania) Steaua București	14	4	0	10	109	152	−43	12	
7	(Spain) CN Sabadell	14	3	0	11	115	174	−59	9	
8	(Netherlands) AZC Alphen	14	0	0	14	87	218	−131	0	

Source: LEN

All times are local

=== Matchday 1 ===
==== CN Sabadell vs. Szolnoki VSC ====
25 October 2017; 18:15	Report	CN Sabadell (Spain)	5–16	(Hungary) Szolnoki VSC	Sabadell; Referees: Naumov (RUS), Ohme (GER)
25 October 2017; 18:15	Report	Score by quarters: 0–4, 2–5, 2–4, 1–3			Sabadell; Referees: Naumov (RUS), Ohme (GER)
25 October 2017; 18:15	Report	Gorria 4	Goals	Aleksić, Prlainović 4	Sabadell; Referees: Naumov (RUS), Ohme (GER)

==== Steaua București vs. ZF Eger ====
25 October 2017; 20:30	Report	Steaua București (Romania)	3–8	(Hungary) ZF Eger	Bucharest; Referees: Golikov (RUS), Ðurašković (MNE)
25 October 2017; 20:30	Report	Score by quarters: 1–1, 1–2, 0–2, 1–3			Bucharest; Referees: Golikov (RUS), Ðurašković (MNE)
25 October 2017; 20:30	Report	three players 1	Goals	Hosnyánszky 4	Bucharest; Referees: Golikov (RUS), Ðurašković (MNE)

==== Jadran Carine vs. Spandau 04 ====
25 October 2017; 20:30	Report	Jadran Carine (Montenegro)	11–5	(Germany) Spandau 04	Herceg Novi; Referees: Achladiotis (GRE), Molnár (HUN)
25 October 2017; 20:30	Report	Score by quarters: 2–3, 3–0, 5–0, 1–2			Herceg Novi; Referees: Achladiotis (GRE), Molnár (HUN)
25 October 2017; 20:30	Report	three players 2	Goals	Gielen, Dedović 2	Herceg Novi; Referees: Achladiotis (GRE), Molnár (HUN)

==== Pro Recco vs. AZC Alphen ====
25 October 2017; 20:30	Report	Pro Recco (Italy)	19–1	(Netherlands) AZC Alphen	Genoa; Referees: Mercier (FRA), Häntschel (GER)
25 October 2017; 20:30	Report	Score by quarters: 6–0, 4–0, 5–0, 4–1			Genoa; Referees: Mercier (FRA), Häntschel (GER)
25 October 2017; 20:30	Report	Figari 4	Goals	van Gulik 1	Genoa; Referees: Mercier (FRA), Häntschel (GER)

=== Matchday 2 ===
==== ZF Eger vs. Pro Recco ====
8 November 2017; 18:30	Report	ZF Eger (Hungary)	4–6	(Italy) Pro Recco	Eger; Referees: Alexandrescu (ROU), Franulović (CRO)
8 November 2017; 18:30	Report	Score by quarters: 1–3, 2–2, 1–1, 0–0			Eger; Referees: Alexandrescu (ROU), Franulović (CRO)
8 November 2017; 18:30	Report	Rašović 4	Goals	Molina, Ivović 2	Eger; Referees: Alexandrescu (ROU), Franulović (CRO)

==== Szolnoki VSC vs. Steaua București ====
8 November 2017; 18:30	Report	Szolnoki VSC (Hungary)	15–3	(Romania) Steaua București	Szolnok; Referees: Krizhanovskiy (RUS), Michalis (GRE)
8 November 2017; 18:30	Report	Score by quarters: 4–0, 2–2, 5–0, 4–1			Szolnok; Referees: Krizhanovskiy (RUS), Michalis (GRE)
8 November 2017; 18:30	Report	Aleksić 4	Goals	three players 1	Szolnok; Referees: Krizhanovskiy (RUS), Michalis (GRE)

==== Spandau 04 vs. CN Sabadell ====
8 November 2017; 19:30	Report	Spandau 04 (Germany)	11–8	(Spain) CN Sabadell	Berlin; Referees: Kun (HUN), Mercier (FRA)
8 November 2017; 19:30	Report	Score by quarters: 4–1, 2–0, 3–4, 2–3			Berlin; Referees: Kun (HUN), Mercier (FRA)
8 November 2017; 19:30	Report	Ćuk 3	Goals	three players 2	Berlin; Referees: Kun (HUN), Mercier (FRA)

==== AZC Alphen vs. Jadran Carine ====
8 November 2017; 20:30	Report	AZC Alphen (Netherlands)	7–14	(Montenegro) Jadran Carine	Alphen aan den Rijn; Referees: Galindo (ESP), Petronilli (ITA)
8 November 2017; 20:30	Report	Score by quarters: 2–3, 0–2, 2–5, 3–4			Alphen aan den Rijn; Referees: Galindo (ESP), Petronilli (ITA)
8 November 2017; 20:30	Report	Filipović 3	Goals	Ukropina, Merkulov 5	Alphen aan den Rijn; Referees: Galindo (ESP), Petronilli (ITA)

=== Matchday 3 ===
==== CN Sabadell vs. AZC Alphen ====
28 November 2017; 19:00	Report	CN Sabadell (Spain)	12–10	(Netherlands) AZC Alphen	Sabadell; Referees: Seidel (GER), Radičević (CRO)
28 November 2017; 19:00	Report	Score by quarters: 1–1, 4–4, 3–2, 4–3			Sabadell; Referees: Seidel (GER), Radičević (CRO)
28 November 2017; 19:00	Report	Cabanas 4	Goals	Miralis 5	Sabadell; Referees: Seidel (GER), Radičević (CRO)

==== Jadran Carine vs. ZF Eger ====
29 November 2017; 18:30	Report	Jadran Carine (Montenegro)	4–4	(Hungary) ZF Eger	Herceg Novi; Referees: Voevodin (RUS), Severo (ITA)
29 November 2017; 18:30	Report	Score by quarters: 1–0, 0–2, 2–1, 1–1			Herceg Novi; Referees: Voevodin (RUS), Severo (ITA)
29 November 2017; 18:30	Report	four players 1	Goals	Hosnyánszky 2	Herceg Novi; Referees: Voevodin (RUS), Severo (ITA)

==== Spandau 04 vs. Szolnoki VSC ====
29 November 2017; 19:30	Report	Spandau 04 (Germany)	10–9	(Hungary) Szolnoki VSC	Berlin; Referees: Calabro (ITA), Virijević (SRB)
29 November 2017; 19:30	Report	Score by quarters: 5–4, 1–3, 2–1, 2–1			Berlin; Referees: Calabro (ITA), Virijević (SRB)
29 November 2017; 19:30	Report	Ćuk 3	Goals	Zalánki 3	Berlin; Referees: Calabro (ITA), Virijević (SRB)

==== Pro Recco vs. Steaua București ====
29 November 2017; 20:30	Report	Pro Recco (Italy)	15–6	(Romania) Steaua București	Genoa; Referees: Spiegel (GER), Korokev (AUT)
29 November 2017; 20:30	Report	Score by quarters: 5–0, 3–4, 5–1, 2–1			Genoa; Referees: Spiegel (GER), Korokev (AUT)
29 November 2017; 20:30	Report	Ivović 4	Goals	six players 1	Genoa; Referees: Spiegel (GER), Korokev (AUT)

=== Matchday 4 ===
==== Steaua București vs. Jadran Carine ====
8 December 2017; 20:30	Report	Steaua București (Romania)	4–8	(Montenegro) Jadran Carine	Bucharest; Referees: Mercier (FRA), Kun (HUN)
8 December 2017; 20:30	Report	Score by quarters: 2–1, 2–3, 0–0, 0–4			Bucharest; Referees: Mercier (FRA), Kun (HUN)
8 December 2017; 20:30	Report	Delgado 3	Goals	Merkulov 4	Bucharest; Referees: Mercier (FRA), Kun (HUN)

==== ZF Eger vs. CN Sabadell ====
9 December 2017; 18:00	Report	ZF Eger (Hungary)	14–5	(Spain) CN Sabadell	Eger; Referees: Rovida (ITA), Achladiotis (GRE)
9 December 2017; 18:00	Report	Score by quarters: 3–1, 4–2, 5–2, 2–0			Eger; Referees: Rovida (ITA), Achladiotis (GRE)
9 December 2017; 18:00	Report	Rašović 5	Goals	Cabanas 2	Eger; Referees: Rovida (ITA), Achladiotis (GRE)

==== Szolnoki VSC vs. Pro Recco ====
9 December 2017; 18:30	Report	Szolnoki VSC (Hungary)	10–9	(Italy) Pro Recco	Szolnok; Referees: Putniković (SRB), Naumov (RUS)
9 December 2017; 18:30	Report	Score by quarters: 1–3, 2–2, 3–2, 4–2			Szolnok; Referees: Putniković (SRB), Naumov (RUS)
9 December 2017; 18:30	Report	Younger 4	Goals	Ivović 4	Szolnok; Referees: Putniković (SRB), Naumov (RUS)

==== AZC Alphen vs. Spandau 04 ====
9 December 2017; 20:30	Report	AZC Alphen (Netherlands)	5–17	(Germany) Spandau 04	Alphen aan den Rijn; Referees: Franulović (CRO), Raković (SRB)
9 December 2017; 20:30	Report	Score by quarters: 1–2, 2–5, 0–5, 2–5			Alphen aan den Rijn; Referees: Franulović (CRO), Raković (SRB)
9 December 2017; 20:30	Report	Filipović 3	Goals	Ćuk 4	Alphen aan den Rijn; Referees: Franulović (CRO), Raković (SRB)

=== Matchday 5 ===
==== CN Sabadell vs. Steaua București ====
19 December 2017; 19:00	Report	CN Sabadell (Spain)	10–11	(Romania) Steaua București	Sabadell
19 December 2017; 19:00	Report	Score by quarters: 0–3, 4–4, 3–1, 3–3			Sabadell
19 December 2017; 19:00	Report	Fenoy 3	Goals	Gheorghe, Buljubašić 3	Sabadell

==== Jadran Carine vs. Pro Recco ====
20 December 2017; 18:30	Report	Jadran Carine (Montenegro)	5–15	(Italy) Pro Recco	Herceg Novi; Referees: Alexandrescu (ROU), Buch (ESP)
20 December 2017; 18:30	Report	Score by quarters: 2–3, 0–2, 1–3, 2–7			Herceg Novi; Referees: Alexandrescu (ROU), Buch (ESP)
20 December 2017; 18:30	Report	five players 1	Goals	Di Fulvio, Ivović 4	Herceg Novi; Referees: Alexandrescu (ROU), Buch (ESP)

==== Spandau 04 vs. ZF Eger ====
20 December 2017; 19:30	Report	Spandau 04 (Germany)	10–9	(Hungary) ZF Eger	Berlin; Referees: Petronilli (ITA), Margeta (SLO)
20 December 2017; 19:30	Report	Score by quarters: 3–4, 4–3, 2–0, 1–2			Berlin; Referees: Petronilli (ITA), Margeta (SLO)
20 December 2017; 19:30	Report	Reibel 3	Goals	Balázs 3	Berlin; Referees: Petronilli (ITA), Margeta (SLO)

==== AZC Alphen vs. Szolnoki VSC ====
20 December 2017; 20:30	Report	AZC Alphen (Netherlands)	6–17	(Hungary) Szolnoki VSC	Alphen aan den Rijn; Referees: Mercier (FRA), Spanoudis (GRE)
20 December 2017; 20:30	Report	Score by quarters: 1–4, 4–5, 1–5, 0–3			Alphen aan den Rijn; Referees: Mercier (FRA), Spanoudis (GRE)
20 December 2017; 20:30	Report	Inđić, Filipović 2	Goals	Younger 4	Alphen aan den Rijn; Referees: Mercier (FRA), Spanoudis (GRE)

=== Matchday 6 ===
==== Jadran Carine vs. Szolnoki VSC ====
13 January 2018; 17:30	Report	Jadran Carine (Montenegro)	6–14	(Hungary) Szolnoki VSC	Herceg Novi; Referees: Severo (ITA), Gomez (ESP)
13 January 2018; 17:30	Report	Score by quarters: 0–4, 0–5, 2–1, 4–4			Herceg Novi; Referees: Severo (ITA), Gomez (ESP)
13 January 2018; 17:30	Report	Merkulov 2	Goals	Prlainović, Bence 3	Herceg Novi; Referees: Severo (ITA), Gomez (ESP)

==== ZF Eger vs. AZC Alphen ====
13 January 2018; 18:30	Report	ZF Eger (Hungary)	15–4	(Netherlands) AZC Alphen	Eger; Referees: Radičević (CRO), Stanojević (SRB)
13 January 2018; 18:30	Report	Score by quarters: 2–1, 5–1, 4–0, 4–2			Eger; Referees: Radičević (CRO), Stanojević (SRB)
13 January 2018; 18:30	Report	Vlachopoulos 4	Goals	four players 1	Eger; Referees: Radičević (CRO), Stanojević (SRB)

==== Steaua București vs. Spandau 04 ====
13 January 2018; 20:30	Report	Steaua București (Romania)	5–6	(Germany) Spandau 04	Bucharest; Referees: Buch (ESP), Ivanovski (MNE)
13 January 2018; 20:30	Report	Score by quarters: 1–0, 1–3, 2–1, 1–2			Bucharest; Referees: Buch (ESP), Ivanovski (MNE)
13 January 2018; 20:30	Report	five players 1	Goals	six players 1	Bucharest; Referees: Buch (ESP), Ivanovski (MNE)

==== Pro Recco vs. CN Sabadell ====
13 January 2018; 20:30	Report	Pro Recco (Italy)	13–5	(Spain) CN Sabadell	Genoa; Referees: Székely (HUN), De Jong (NED)
13 January 2018; 20:30	Report	Score by quarters: 3–2, 3–1, 6–0, 1–2			Genoa; Referees: Székely (HUN), De Jong (NED)
13 January 2018; 20:30	Report	Di Fulvio 3	Goals	Carrillo, López 2	Genoa; Referees: Székely (HUN), De Jong (NED)

=== Matchday 7 ===
==== CN Sabadell vs. Jadran Carine ====
23 January 2018; 19:00	Report	CN Sabadell (Spain)	8–10	(Montenegro) Jadran Carine	Sabadell; Referees: Székely (HUN), Achladiotis (GRE)
23 January 2018; 19:00	Report	Score by quarters: 1–3, 2–3, 3–2, 2–2			Sabadell; Referees: Székely (HUN), Achladiotis (GRE)
23 January 2018; 19:00	Report	Müller 3	Goals	Drašković 3	Sabadell; Referees: Székely (HUN), Achladiotis (GRE)

==== Szolnoki VSC vs. ZF Eger ====
24 January 2018; 18:30	Report	Szolnoki VSC (Hungary)	10–11	(Hungary) ZF Eger	Szolnok; Referees: Stavridis (GRE), Naumov (RUS)
24 January 2018; 18:30	Report	Score by quarters: 3–3, 4–3, 1–1, 2–4			Szolnok; Referees: Stavridis (GRE), Naumov (RUS)
24 January 2018; 18:30	Report	Zalánki, Younger 3	Goals	Angyal, Rašović 3	Szolnok; Referees: Stavridis (GRE), Naumov (RUS)

==== Spandau 04 vs. Pro Recco ====
24 January 2018; 19:30	Report	Spandau 04 (Germany)	9–10	(Italy) Pro Recco	Berlin; Referees: Gomez (ESP), Golijanin (SRB)
24 January 2018; 19:30	Report	Score by quarters: 1–3, 3–4, 2–3, 3–0			Berlin; Referees: Gomez (ESP), Golijanin (SRB)
24 January 2018; 19:30	Report	four players 2	Goals	four players 2	Berlin; Referees: Gomez (ESP), Golijanin (SRB)

==== AZC Alphen vs. Steaua București ====
24 January 2018; 20:30	Report	AZC Alphen (Netherlands)	4–15	(Romania) Steaua București	Alphen aan den Rijn; Referees: Vlašić (CRO), Schwartz (ISR)
24 January 2018; 20:30	Report	Score by quarters: 0–4, 0–3, 0–5, 4–3			Alphen aan den Rijn; Referees: Vlašić (CRO), Schwartz (ISR)
24 January 2018; 20:30	Report	four players 1	Goals	three players 3	Alphen aan den Rijn; Referees: Vlašić (CRO), Schwartz (ISR)

=== Matchday 8 ===
==== Jadran Carine vs. CN Sabadell ====
7 February 2018; 17:30	Report	Jadran Carine (Montenegro)	7–8	(Spain) CN Sabadell	Herceg Novi; Referees: Molnár (HUN), Van der Loo (NED)
7 February 2018; 17:30	Report	Score by quarters: 3–1, 0–3, 3–1, 1–3			Herceg Novi; Referees: Molnár (HUN), Van der Loo (NED)
7 February 2018; 17:30	Report	Ukropina, Merkulov 2	Goals	Cabanas 3	Herceg Novi; Referees: Molnár (HUN), Van der Loo (NED)

==== ZF Eger vs. Szolnoki VSC ====
7 February 2018; 18:30	Report	ZF Eger (Hungary)	6–3	(Hungary) Szolnoki VSC	Eger; Referees: Margeta (SLO), Koryzna (POL)
7 February 2018; 18:30	Report	Score by quarters: 1–0, 3–1, 0–0, 2–2			Eger; Referees: Margeta (SLO), Koryzna (POL)
7 February 2018; 18:30	Report	Vlachopoulos 2	Goals	Zalánki 2	Eger; Referees: Margeta (SLO), Koryzna (POL)

==== Steaua București vs. AZC Alphen ====
7 February 2018; 20:30	Report	Steaua București (Romania)	9–8	(Netherlands) AZC Alphen	Bucharest; Referees: Colombo (ITA), Boudramis (GRE)
7 February 2018; 20:30	Report	Score by quarters: 4–1, 1–3, 2–2, 2–2			Bucharest; Referees: Colombo (ITA), Boudramis (GRE)
7 February 2018; 20:30	Report	Murišić 3	Goals	Mandolini 4	Bucharest; Referees: Colombo (ITA), Boudramis (GRE)

==== Pro Recco vs. Spandau 04 ====
7 February 2018; 20:30	Report	Pro Recco (Italy)	12–4	(Germany) Spandau 04	Genoa; Referees: Peris (CRO), Golikov (RUS)
7 February 2018; 20:30	Report	Score by quarters: 4–1, 2–1, 2–1, 4–1			Genoa; Referees: Peris (CRO), Golikov (RUS)
7 February 2018; 20:30	Report	Di Fulvio 4	Goals	four players 1	Genoa; Referees: Peris (CRO), Golikov (RUS)

=== Matchday 9 ===
==== CN Sabadell vs. Pro Recco ====
27 February 2018; 19:00	Report	CN Sabadell (Spain)	9–18	(Italy) Pro Recco	Sabadell; Referees: Štampalija (CRO), Toygarli (TUR)
27 February 2018; 19:00	Report	Score by quarters: 2–3, 2–5, 4–4, 1–6			Sabadell; Referees: Štampalija (CRO), Toygarli (TUR)
27 February 2018; 19:00	Report	Carrillo 4	Goals	three players 3	Sabadell; Referees: Štampalija (CRO), Toygarli (TUR)

==== Szolnoki VSC vs. Jadran Carine ====
28 February 2018; 18:00	Report	Szolnoki VSC (Hungary)	13–10	(Montenegro) Jadran Carine	Szolnok; Referees: Raković (SRB), Krizhanovskiy (RUS)
28 February 2018; 18:00	Report	Score by quarters: 6–3, 1–3, 2–2, 4–2			Szolnok; Referees: Raković (SRB), Krizhanovskiy (RUS)
28 February 2018; 18:00	Report	Aleksić 4	Goals	Drašković 3	Szolnok; Referees: Raković (SRB), Krizhanovskiy (RUS)

==== Spandau 04 vs. Steaua București ====
28 February 2018; 19:30	Report	Spandau 04 (Germany)	11–9	(Romania) Steaua București	Berlin; Referees: Golosoun (BLR), Fogel (ISR)
28 February 2018; 19:30	Report	Score by quarters: 1–2, 1–2, 7–3, 2–2			Berlin; Referees: Golosoun (BLR), Fogel (ISR)
28 February 2018; 19:30	Report	Gielen 4	Goals	Murišić 4	Berlin; Referees: Golosoun (BLR), Fogel (ISR)

==== AZC Alphen vs. ZF Eger ====
28 February 2018; 20:30	Report	AZC Alphen (Netherlands)	4–14	(Hungary) ZF Eger	Alphen aan den Rijn; Referees: Boudramis (GRE), Castagnola (ITA)
28 February 2018; 20:30	Report	Score by quarters: 1–2, 1–4, 2–4, 0–4			Alphen aan den Rijn; Referees: Boudramis (GRE), Castagnola (ITA)
28 February 2018; 20:30	Report	four players 1	Goals	Rašović 4	Alphen aan den Rijn; Referees: Boudramis (GRE), Castagnola (ITA)

=== Matchday 10 ===
==== Steaua București vs. CN Sabadell ====
14 March 2018; 18:30	Report	Steaua București (Romania)	10–9	(Spain) CN Sabadell	Bucharest; Referees: Putniković (SRB), Marjay (HUN)
14 March 2018; 18:30	Report	Score by quarters: 3–2, 3–2, 3–2, 1–3			Bucharest; Referees: Putniković (SRB), Marjay (HUN)
14 March 2018; 18:30	Report	Delgado 3	Goals	Cabanas 3	Bucharest; Referees: Putniković (SRB), Marjay (HUN)

==== Szolnoki VSC vs. AZC Alphen ====
14 March 2018; 18:30	Report	Szolnoki VSC (Hungary)	17–4	(Netherlands) AZC Alphen	Szolnok; Referees: Ivanovski (MNE), Petronilli (ITA)
14 March 2018; 18:30	Report	Score by quarters: 4–1, 6–1, 3–1, 4–1			Szolnok; Referees: Ivanovski (MNE), Petronilli (ITA)
14 March 2018; 18:30	Report	Zalánki 4	Goals	Inđić 2	Szolnok; Referees: Ivanovski (MNE), Petronilli (ITA)

==== ZF Eger vs. Spandau 04 ====
14 March 2018; 18:30	Report	ZF Eger (Hungary)	8–4	(Germany) Spandau 04	Eger; Referees: Buch (ESP), Peris (CRO)
14 March 2018; 18:30	Report	Score by quarters: 2–2, 1–2, 2–0, 3–0			Eger; Referees: Buch (ESP), Peris (CRO)
14 March 2018; 18:30	Report	Čučković 2	Goals	Dedović 3	Eger; Referees: Buch (ESP), Peris (CRO)

==== Pro Recco vs. Jadran Carine ====
14 March 2018; 20:30	Report	Pro Recco (Italy)	10–5	(Montenegro) Jadran Carine	Genoa; Referees: Schwartz (ISR), Mustata (ROU)
14 March 2018; 20:30	Report	Score by quarters: 1–1, 4–1, 4–2, 1–1			Genoa; Referees: Schwartz (ISR), Mustata (ROU)
14 March 2018; 20:30	Report	Mandić 3	Goals	Drašković 3	Genoa; Referees: Schwartz (ISR), Mustata (ROU)

=== Matchday 11 ===
==== Jadran Carine vs. Steaua București ====
31 March 2018; 19:00	Report	Jadran Carine (Montenegro)	16–10	(Romania) Steaua București	Herceg Novi; Referees: Németh (HUN), Castagnola (ITA)
31 March 2018; 19:00	Report	Score by quarters: 4–2, 6–4, 3–2, 3–2			Herceg Novi; Referees: Németh (HUN), Castagnola (ITA)
31 March 2018; 19:00	Report	Spaić 5	Goals	Murišić	Herceg Novi; Referees: Németh (HUN), Castagnola (ITA)

==== Spandau 04 vs. AZC Alphen ====
31 March 2018; 19:30	Report	Spandau 04 (Germany)	14–8	(Netherlands) AZC Alphen	Berlin; Referees: Gomez (ESP), Tóth (HUN)
31 March 2018; 19:30	Report	Score by quarters: 4–1, 5–3, 2–2, 3–2			Berlin; Referees: Gomez (ESP), Tóth (HUN)
31 March 2018; 19:30	Report	Pješivac 4	Goals	Ćorić, Inđić 3	Berlin; Referees: Gomez (ESP), Tóth (HUN)

==== Pro Recco vs. Szolnoki VSC ====
31 March 2018; 20:30	Report	Pro Recco (Italy)	8–5	(Hungary) Szolnoki VSC	Genoa; Referees: Alexandrescu (ROU), Štampalija (CRO)
31 March 2018; 20:30	Report	Score by quarters: 3–2, 2–1, 1–2, 2–0			Genoa; Referees: Alexandrescu (ROU), Štampalija (CRO)
31 March 2018; 20:30	Report	Mandić, Ivović 2	Goals	Younger 4	Genoa; Referees: Alexandrescu (ROU), Štampalija (CRO)

==== CN Sabadell vs. ZF Eger ====
1 April 2018; 12:00	Report	CN Sabadell (Spain)	7–15	(Hungary) ZF Eger	Sabadell; Referees: De Jong (NED), Obradović (MNE)
1 April 2018; 12:00	Report	Score by quarters: 2–3, 3–4, 2–5, 0–3			Sabadell; Referees: De Jong (NED), Obradović (MNE)
1 April 2018; 12:00	Report	Carrillo 3	Goals	Rašović 5	Sabadell; Referees: De Jong (NED), Obradović (MNE)

=== Matchday 12 ===
==== Szolnoki VSC vs. Spandau 04 ====
18 April 2018; 16:30	Report	Szolnoki VSC (Hungary)	9–8	(Germany) Spandau 04	Szolnok; Referees: Stavridis (GRE), Galkin (RUS)
18 April 2018; 16:30	Report	Score by quarters: 3–2, 1–1, 2–2, 3–3			Szolnok; Referees: Stavridis (GRE), Galkin (RUS)
18 April 2018; 16:30	Report	Zalánki, Kis 3	Goals	Saudadier, Pješivac 2	Szolnok; Referees: Stavridis (GRE), Galkin (RUS)

==== Steaua București vs. Pro Recco ====
18 April 2018; 18:30	Report	Steaua București (Romania)	6–13	(Italy) Pro Recco	Bucharest; Referees: Koryzna (POL), Golikov (RUS)
18 April 2018; 18:30	Report	Score by quarters: 2–3, 2–3, 0–3, 2–4			Bucharest; Referees: Koryzna (POL), Golikov (RUS)
18 April 2018; 18:30	Report	Filipović 3	Goals	Mandić 3	Bucharest; Referees: Koryzna (POL), Golikov (RUS)

==== ZF Eger vs. Jadran Carine ====
18 April 2018; 18:30	Report	ZF Eger (Hungary)	8–4	(Montenegro) Jadran Carine	Eger; Referees: Alexandrescu (ROU), Schwartz (ISR)
18 April 2018; 18:30	Report	Score by quarters: 2–0, 2–1, 1–2, 3–1			Eger; Referees: Alexandrescu (ROU), Schwartz (ISR)
18 April 2018; 18:30	Report	Hosnyánszky, Kovács 2	Goals	Radović 2	Eger; Referees: Alexandrescu (ROU), Schwartz (ISR)

==== AZC Alphen vs. CN Sabadell ====
18 April 2018; 20:30	Report	AZC Alphen (Netherlands)	14–16	(Spain) CN Sabadell	Alphen aan den Rijn; Referees: Stanojević (SRB), Petronilli (ITA)
18 April 2018; 20:30	Report	Score by quarters: 5–5, 3–1, 3–6, 3–4			Alphen aan den Rijn; Referees: Stanojević (SRB), Petronilli (ITA)
18 April 2018; 20:30	Report	three players 3	Goals	Cabanas 3	Alphen aan den Rijn; Referees: Stanojević (SRB), Petronilli (ITA)

=== Matchday 13 ===
==== Steaua București vs. Szolnoki VSC ====
28 April 2018; 18:15	Report	Steaua București (Romania)	9–17	(Hungary) Szolnoki VSC	Bucharest; Referees: Raković (SRB), Birakis (GRE)
28 April 2018; 18:15	Report	Score by quarters: 2–6, 4–4, 3–5, 0–2			Bucharest; Referees: Raković (SRB), Birakis (GRE)
28 April 2018; 18:15	Report	Buljubašić 3	Goals	Prlainović 5	Bucharest; Referees: Raković (SRB), Birakis (GRE)

==== Jadran Carine vs. AZC Alphen ====
28 April 2018; 19:00	Report	Jadran Carine (Montenegro)	15–7	(Netherlands) AZC Alphen	Herceg Novi; Referees: Fester (GER), Kouretas (GRE)
28 April 2018; 19:00	Report	Score by quarters: 4–2, 2–2, 5–2, 4–1			Herceg Novi; Referees: Fester (GER), Kouretas (GRE)
28 April 2018; 19:00	Report	six players 2	Goals	Inđić 3	Herceg Novi; Referees: Fester (GER), Kouretas (GRE)

==== Pro Recco vs. ZF Eger ====
28 April 2018; 20:30	Report	Pro Recco (Italy)	14–6	(Hungary) ZF Eger	Genoa; Referees: Putniković (SRB), Gomez (ESP)
28 April 2018; 20:30	Report	Score by quarters: 4–1, 3–1, 2–3, 5–1			Genoa; Referees: Putniković (SRB), Gomez (ESP)
28 April 2018; 20:30	Report	Filipović 4	Goals	Angyal, Rašović 2	Genoa; Referees: Putniković (SRB), Gomez (ESP)

==== CN Sabadell vs. Spandau 04 ====
29 April 2018; 12:00	Report	CN Sabadell (Spain)	9–11	(Germany) Spandau 04	Sabadell; Referees: Mišković (MNE), Bianco (ITA)
29 April 2018; 12:00	Report	Score by quarters: 2–3, 5–4, 0–1, 2–3			Sabadell; Referees: Mišković (MNE), Bianco (ITA)
29 April 2018; 12:00	Report	Müller 3	Goals	Stamm 4	Sabadell; Referees: Mišković (MNE), Bianco (ITA)

=== Matchday 14 ===
==== ZF Eger vs. Steaua București ====
9 May 2018; 18:30	Report	ZF Eger (Hungary)	12–9	(Romania) Steaua București	Eger; Referees: Ortega (ESP), Bianco (ITA)
9 May 2018; 18:30	Report	Score by quarters: 2–2, 3–2, 4–4, 3–1			Eger; Referees: Ortega (ESP), Bianco (ITA)
9 May 2018; 18:30	Report	Vlachopoulos 5	Goals	three players 2	Eger; Referees: Ortega (ESP), Bianco (ITA)

==== Szolnoki VSC vs. CN Sabadell ====
9 May 2018; 18:30	Report	Szolnoki VSC (Hungary)	14–4	(Spain) CN Sabadell	Szolnok; Referees: Dervieux (FRA), Castagnola (ITA)
9 May 2018; 18:30	Report	Score by quarters: 3–1, 2–1, 5–0, 4–2			Szolnok; Referees: Dervieux (FRA), Castagnola (ITA)
9 May 2018; 18:30	Report	Aleksić, Younger 3	Goals	four players 1	Szolnok; Referees: Dervieux (FRA), Castagnola (ITA)

==== Spandau 04 vs. Jadran Carine ====
9 May 2018; 19:30	Report	Spandau 04 (Germany)	13–13	(Montenegro) Jadran Carine	Berlin; Referees: Margeta (SLO), Voevodin (RUS)
9 May 2018; 19:30	Report	Score by quarters: 3–3, 2–1, 2–2, 6–7			Berlin; Referees: Margeta (SLO), Voevodin (RUS)
9 May 2018; 19:30	Report	Gielen, Negrean 3	Goals	Merkulov 4	Berlin; Referees: Margeta (SLO), Voevodin (RUS)

==== AZC Alphen vs. Pro Recco ====
9 May 2018; 20:30	Report	AZC Alphen (Netherlands)	5–24	(Italy) Pro Recco	Alphen aan den Rijn; Referees: Garcia (SUI), Franulović (CRO)
9 May 2018; 20:30	Report	Score by quarters: 1–6, 1–6, 2–6, 1–6			Alphen aan den Rijn; Referees: Garcia (SUI), Franulović (CRO)
9 May 2018; 20:30	Report	five players 1	Goals	Molina 5	Alphen aan den Rijn; Referees: Garcia (SUI), Franulović (CRO)
