= Soviet Water Polo Championship =

Defunct Russian water polo league

The Soviet Water Polo Championship was the premier water polo in the Soviet Union. First held in 1925, it was disestablished in 1992 following the dissolution of the Soviet Union and succeeded by the Russian Championship. Three teams from the Soviet Championship, CSKA Moscow, Dynamo Moscow and MGU Moscow, won the European Cup and/or the Cup Winners' Cup.

== Champions ==
- (Russian Soviet Federative Socialist Republic) CSKA Moscow (21)
  - 1945, 1946, 1949, 1954, 1964, 1965, 1966, 1970, 1971, 1975, 1976, 1977, 1978, 1980, 1983, 1984, 1988, 1989, 1990, 1991, 1992
- (Russian Soviet Federative Socialist Republic) Dynamo Moscow (11)
  - 1955, 1957, 1958, 1960, 1961, 1962, 1968, 1969, 1985, 1986, 1987
- (Russian Soviet Federative Socialist Republic) Moscow XI (6)
  - 1925, 1936, 1956, 1959, 1963, 1967
- (Russian Soviet Federative Socialist Republic) MGU Moscow (4)
  - 1972, 1973, 1974, 1979
- (Russian Soviet Federative Socialist Republic) VMS Leningrad (3)
  - 1940, 1947, 1950
- (Russian Soviet Federative Socialist Republic) Dynamo Leningrad (2)
  - 1938, 1939
- (Russian Soviet Federative Socialist Republic) Torpedo Moscow (2)
  - 1948, 1953
- (Kazakh Soviet Socialist Republic) Dynamo Alma-Ata (2)
  - 1981, 1982
- (Russian Soviet Federative Socialist Republic) Leningrad XI (1)
  - 1928
- (Russian Soviet Federative Socialist Republic) Profsoyuzny (1)
  - 1934
- (Russian Soviet Federative Socialist Republic) Elektrik Leningrad (1)
  - 1937

=== Other teams that made it into the top three ===
- (Azerbaijan Soviet Socialist Republic) Azerbaijan XI
- (Azerbaijan Soviet Socialist Republic) KKF Baku
- (Ukrainian Soviet Socialist Republic) Dynamo Kyiv
- (Ukrainian Soviet Socialist Republic) Dynamo Lviv
- (Georgian Soviet Socialist Republic) Dinamo Tbilisi
- (Georgian Soviet Socialist Republic) Georgia XI
- (Russian Soviet Federative Socialist Republic) Moskovich AZLK
- (Russian Soviet Federative Socialist Republic) Stalinets Moscow
- (Ukrainian Soviet Socialist Republic) Trud Kyiv
- (Ukrainian Soviet Socialist Republic) Ukraine XI
