= 2001–02 LEN Cup Winners' Cup =

- League: Cup Winners' Cup
- Sport: Water Polo
- Duration: 23 November 2001 to 14 April 2002
- Number of teams: 8 (Quarter-finals); 16 (Total)
- Finals champions: (Hungary) Vasas (3rd title)
- Runners-up: (Croatia) Mladost

Cup Winners' Cup seasons
- ← 2000–01 2002-03 →

The 2001–02 LEN Cup Winners' Cup is the ongoing 28th edition of LEN's second-tier competition for men's water polo clubs.

== Qualifying rounds ==
=== Qualification round II ===
- 23–25 November

Group winners and runners-up teams of each group advance to quarter finals.

Key to colours in group tables
Group winners and runners-up advance to quarter finals

=== Group A ===
Jadran Herceg Novi has the right to organize the tournament.

Team	Pld	W	D	L	GF	GA	GD	Pts
(Italy) Florentia	3	3	0	0	-	-	—	6
(Federal Republic of Yugoslavia) Jadran Herceg Novi	3	2	0	1	-	-	—	4
(Turkey) İstanbul YİK	3	1	0	2	-	-	—	2
(Slovenia) Olimpija	3	0	0	3	-	-	—	0

=== Group B ===
Cannstatt has the right to organize the tournament.

Team	Pld	W	D	L	GF	GA	GD	Pts
(Russia) Spartak Volgograd	3	3	0	0	-	-	—	6
(Germany) Cannstatt	3	2	0	1	-	-	—	4
(Netherlands) Leidische	3	1	0	2	-	-	—	2
(France) Tourcoing	3	0	0	3	-	-	—	0

=== Group C ===
Barcelona has the right to organize the tournament.

Team	Pld	W	D	L	GF	GA	GD	Pts
(Spain) Barcelona	3	3	0	0	-	-	—	6
(Greece) Vouliagmeni	3	2	0	1	-	-	—	4
(Romania) Dinamo București	3	1	0	2	-	-	—	2
(Republic of Ireland) Guinness	3	0	0	3	-	-	—	0

=== Group D ===
Dauphins Mouscron has the right to organize the tournament.

Team	Pld	W	D	L	GF	GA	GD	Pts
(Hungary) Vasas	3	3	0	0	-	-	—	6
(Croatia) HAVK Mladost	3	2	0	1	-	-	—	4
(Slovakia) ŠKP Košice	3	1	0	2	-	-	—	2
(Belgium) Dauphins Mouscron	3	0	0	3	-	-	—	0

== Knockout stage ==
=== Quarter-finals ===
The first legs were played on 19 and 20 January, and the second legs were played on 2 and 3 February 2002.

Team 1	Agg.	Team 2	1st leg	2nd leg
Vasas (Hungary)	20–17	(Germany) Cannstatt	9–7	11–10
Vouliagmeni (Greece)	12–10	(Italy) Florentia	5–4	7–6
Barcelona (Spain)	9–11	(Federal Republic of Yugoslavia) Jadran Herceg Novi	4–2	5–9
HAVK Mladost (Croatia)	12–11	(Russia) Spartak Volgograd	6–6	6–5

== Semi-finals ==
The first legs were played on 23 and 24 February, and the second legs were played on 9 and 10 March 2002.

Team 1	Agg.	Team 2	1st leg	2nd leg
Vasas (Hungary)	17–15	(Greece) Vouliagmeni	10–8	7–7
Jadran Herceg Novi (Federal Republic of Yugoslavia)	7–10	(Croatia) HAVK Mladost	7–5	2–5

== Finals ==
The first legs was played on 24 March, and the second legs was played on 14 April 2002.

Team 1	Agg.	Team 2	1st leg	2nd leg
Vasas (Hungary)	11–10	(Croatia) HAVK Mladost	6–3	5–7

2001–02 Cup Winners' Cup
Champions
(Hungary) Vasas
3rd title

Zoltán Kósz, Máté Hesz, Norbert Madaras, Zoltán Mátyás, János Plézer, Ádám Steinmetz, Bulcsú Székely, Dániel Varga, Tamás Varga, Zsolt Varga, Attila Vári, Ferenc Vindisch, Zsolt Németh
Head coach
József Somossy

== See also ==
- 2001–02 LEN Champions League
- 2001–02 LEN Cup
