= 2017–18 LEN Champions League =

Water polo sports season

- League: LEN Champions League
- Sport: Water Polo
- Number of teams: 16 (preliminary round)
- Season MVP: (Croatia) Josip Pavic (Olympiacos)
- Top scorer: (Montenegro) Darko Brguljan 42 goals (Hannover)

Final Eight
- Champions: (Greece) Olympiacos (2nd title)
- Runners-up: (Italy) Pro Recco
- Finals MVP: (Croatia) Josip Pavic (Olympiacos)

Champions League seasons
- ← 2016–17 2018–19 →

The 2017–18 LEN Champions League was the 55th edition of LEN's premier competition for men's water polo clubs.

== Overview ==
=== Team allocation ===
12 teams are directly qualified for the preliminary round (TH: Champions League title holders).

Preliminary Round
(Croatia) Jug CO	(Germany) Waspo 98 Hannover	(Italy) Pro Recco	(Russia) Dynamo Moscow
(France) ~~Olympic Nice~~ (Hungary) ZF Eger	(Greece) Olympiacos	(Netherlands) AZC Alphen	(Serbia) Partizan
(Germany) Spandau 04	(Hungary) Szolnoki VSC^{TH}	(Romania) Steaua București	(Spain) CNA Barceloneta
Qualification round II
(Croatia) HAVK Mladost	(Greece) NC Vouliagmeni	(Romania) CSM Digi Oradea	(Serbia) Crvena zvezda
(France) CN Marseille	(Italy) AN Brescia	(Russia) Spartak Volgograd	(Spain) CN Sabadell
(Germany) ASC Duisburg	(Netherlands) UZSC Utrecht		
Qualification round I
(Bosnia and Herzegovina) Banja Luka	(Hungary) Orvosegyetem SC	(Montenegro) Jadran Carine	(Spain) CN Terrassa
(Croatia) Mornar	(Israel) ASA Tel Aviv	(Portugal) CF Portuense	(Turkey) Enka SK
(France) Strasbourg	(Italy) CC Napoli	(Russia) Sintez Kazan	(Turkey) Galatasaray
(Greece) ANC Glyfada			

=== Phases and rounds dates ===
The schedule of the competition is as follows.

Phase	Round	First leg	Second leg
Qualifying rounds	Qualification round I	14–17 September 2017	
Qualifying rounds	Qualification round II	28 September–1 October 2017	
Qualifying rounds	Qualification round III	14 October 2017	18 October 2017
Preliminary round	Matchday 1	25 October 2017	
Preliminary round	Matchday 2	8 November 2017	
Preliminary round	Matchday 3	29 November 2017	
Preliminary round	Matchday 4	9 December 2017	
Preliminary round	Matchday 5	20 December 2017	
Preliminary round	Matchday 6	13 January 2018	
Preliminary round	Matchday 7	24 January 2018	
Preliminary round	Matchday 8	7 February 2018	
Preliminary round	Matchday 9	28 February 2018	
Preliminary round	Matchday 10	14 March 2018	
Preliminary round	Matchday 11	31 March 2018	
Preliminary round	Matchday 12	18 April 2018	
Preliminary round	Matchday 13	28 April 2018	
Preliminary round	Matchday 14	9 May 2018	
Final Eight	Quarterfinals	7 June 2018	
Final Eight	Semifinals	8 June 2018	
Final Eight	Final	9 June 2018	

== Qualifying rounds ==
=== Qualification round I ===
==== Group A ====
Pos	Team	Pld	W	D	L	GF	GA	GD	Pts	Qualification	(Hungary) OSC	(Russia) SIN	(Spain) TER	(Portugal) POR	(Bosnia and Herzegovina) BAN
1	(Hungary) Orvosegyetem SC	4	4	0	0	73	16	+57	12	Round II	—	10–6			30–2
2	(Russia) Sintez Kazan	4	3	0	1	58	21	+37	9	Round II		—		21–5	
3	(Spain) CN Terrassa	4	2	0	2	46	27	+19	6		5–11	4–6	—		
4	(Portugal) CF Portuense	4	1	0	3	21	62	−41	3		3–22		3–14	—	
5	(Bosnia and Herzegovina) Banja Luka (H)	4	0	0	4	16	88	−72	0			2–25	7–23	5–10	—

Source: LEN
(H) Hosts

==== Group B ====
Pos	Team	Pld	W	D	L	GF	GA	GD	Pts	Qualification	(Montenegro) JAD	(Italy) NAP	(France) STR	(Turkey) ESK
1	(Montenegro) Jadran Carine	3	3	0	0	42	16	+26	9	Round II	—	18–7	7–6	17–3
2	(Italy) CC Napoli	3	2	0	1	33	34	−1	6	Round II		—	9–8	17–8
3	(France) Strasbourg (H)	3	1	0	2	28	23	+5	3				—	
4	(Turkey) Enka SK	3	0	0	3	18	48	−30	0				7–14	—

Source: LEN
(H) Hosts

==== Group C ====
Pos	Team	Pld	W	D	L	GF	GA	GD	Pts	Qualification	(Croatia) MOR	(Greece) GLY	(Turkey) GAL	(Israel) ASA
1	(Croatia) Mornar	3	3	0	0	31	16	+15	9	Round II	—		7–5	
2	(Greece) ANC Glyfada	3	2	0	1	35	21	+14	6	Round II	9–10	—	8–6	
3	(Turkey) Galatasaray	3	1	0	2	24	22	+2	3				—	
4	(Israel) ASA Tel Aviv (H)	3	0	0	3	14	45	−31	0		2–14	5–18	7–13	—

Source: LEN
(H) Hosts

=== Qualification round II ===
==== Group E ====
Pos	Team	Pld	W	D	L	GF	GA	GD	Pts	Qualification	(Russia) SPA	(Montenegro) JAD	(Croatia) MLA	(Germany) DUI
1	(Russia) Spartak Volgograd	3	2	1	0	27	16	+11	7	Round III	—	7–5		14–5
2	(Montenegro) Jadran Carine	3	2	0	1	36	19	+17	6	Round III		—		19–5
3	(Croatia) HAVK Mladost (H)	3	1	1	1	34	22	+12	4		6–6	7–12	—	21–4
4	(Germany) ASC Duisburg	3	0	0	3	14	54	−40	0					—

Source: LEN
(H) Hosts

==== Group F ====
Pos	Team	Pld	W	D	L	GF	GA	GD	Pts	Qualification	(France) MAR	(Hungary) OSC	(Italy) NAP	(Greece) GLY
1	(France) CN Marseille	3	2	1	0	27	16	+11	7	Round III	—			13–10
2	(Hungary) Orvosegyetem SC (H)	3	2	0	1	36	19	+17	6	Round III	7–8	—		19–7
3	(Italy) CC Napoli	3	1	1	1	34	22	+12	4		11–11	7–11	—	
4	(Greece) ANC Glyfada	3	0	0	3	14	54	−40	0				8–11	—

Source: LEN
(H) Hosts

==== Group G ====
Pos	Team	Pld	W	D	L	GF	GA	GD	Pts	Qualification	(Italy) BRE	(Spain) SAB	(Croatia) MOR	(Netherlands) UTR
1	(Italy) AN Brescia	3	3	0	0	46	22	+24	9	Round III	—			23–2
2	(Spain) CN Sabadell (H)	3	2	0	1	33	23	+10	6	Round III	12–13	—	8–3	13–7
3	(Croatia) Mornar	3	1	0	2	22	25	−3	3		8–10		—	
4	(Netherlands) UZSC Utrecht	3	0	0	3	16	47	−31	0				7–11	—

Source: LEN
(H) Hosts

==== Group H ====
Pos	Team	Pld	W	D	L	GF	GA	GD	Pts	Qualification	(Serbia) CZV	(Russia) SIN	(Greece) VOU	(Romania) ORA
1	(Serbia) Crvena zvezda	3	2	0	1	19	19	0	6 (Note: Crvena zvezda 10–8 Sintez Kazan)	Round III	—		6–5	
2	(Russia) Sintez Kazan	3	2	0	1	27	25	+2	6	Round III	8–10	—		
3	(Greece) NC Vouliagmeni	3	1	0	2	20	21	−1	3 (Note: NC Vouliagmeni 8–5 CSM Digi Oradea)			7–10	—	
4	(Romania) CSM Digi Oradea (H)	3	1	0	2	19	20	−1	3		6–3	8–9	5–8	—

Source: LEN
(H) Hosts

=== Qualification round III ===
Team 1	Agg.	Team 2	1st leg	2nd leg
CN Marseille (France)	13–16	(Montenegro) Jadran Carine	6–7	7–9
Spartak Volgograd (Russia)	14–26	(Hungary) Orvosegyetem SC	7–14	7–12
AN Brescia (Italy)	18–17	(Russia) Sintez Kazan	11–9	7–8
Crvena zvezda (Serbia)	14–17	(Spain) CN Sabadell	6–6	8–11

== Preliminary round ==
Location of teams of the 2017–18 LEN Champions League group stage.
Red: Group A; Blue: Group B.

The draw for the group stage was held on 29 August 2017 in Budapest. The 16 teams were drawn into two groups of eight.

In each group, teams play against each other home-and-away in a round-robin format. The group winners, runners-ups, third and fourth placed teams advance to the Final 8. The matchdays are 25 October, 8 and 29 November, 9 and 20 December 2017, 13 and 24 January, 7 and 28 February, 14 and 31 March, 18 and 28 April, 9 May 2018.

A total of 11 national associations are represented in the group stage.

Key to colors
Advance to the Final Eight	Home team win	Draw	Away team win

=== Group A ===
Pos	Team	Pld	W	D	L	GF	GA	GD	Pts	Qualification	(Greece) OLY	(Croatia) JUG	(Spain) BAR	(Italy) BRE	(Russia) DYN	(Germany) HAN	(Hungary) OSC	(Serbia) PAR
1	(Greece) Olympiacos	14	12	1	1	153	102	+51	37	Final Eight	—	8–6	14–10	13–6	17–9	11–7	10–7	16–8
2	(Croatia) Jug CO	14	9	1	4	147	113	+34	28	Final Eight	10–8	—	9–9	10–7	15–10	14–9	12–10	16–5
3	(Spain) CNA Barceloneta	14	8	3	3	137	102	+35	27	Final Eight	7–7	8–6	—	5–7	7–7	13–12	12–6	16–5
4	(Italy) AN Brescia	14	8	2	4	114	106	+8	26	Final Eight	6–7	9–8	6–5	—	9–9	11–9	9–5	13–9
5	(Russia) Dynamo Moscow	14	6	4	4	141	133	+8	22		9–13	12–11	5–9	9–9	—	9–6	7–7	16–4
6	(Germany) Waspo 98 Hannover	14	4	0	10	133	150	−17	12		7–12	6–13	7–13	8–6	11–15	—	13–8	16–6
7	(Hungary) Orvosegyetem SC	14	3	1	10	103	126	−23	10		6–10	4–7	6–8	6–8	5–10	8–7	—	14–6
8	(Serbia) Partizan	14	0	0	14	91	187	−96	0		4–7	8–10	5–15	3–8	10–14	11–15	7–11	—

Source: LEN

=== Group B ===
Pos	Team	Pld	W	D	L	GF	GA	GD	Pts	Qualification	(Italy) REC	(Hungary) EGE	(Hungary) SZO	(Germany) SPA	(Montenegro) JAD	(Romania) STE	(Spain) SAB	(Netherlands) ALP
1	(Italy) Pro Recco	14	13	0	1	186	80	+106	39	Final Eight	—	14–6	8–5	12–4	10–5	15–6	13–5	19–1
2	(Hungary) ZF Eger	14	10	1	3	134	87	+47	31	Final Eight	4–6	—	6–3	8–4	8–4	12–9	14–5	15–4
3	(Hungary) Szolnoki VSC	14	10	0	4	169	99	+70	30	Final Eight	10–9	10–11	—	9–8	13–10	15–3	14–4	17–4
4	(Germany) Spandau 04	14	8	1	5	133	125	+8	25	Final Eight	9–10	10–9	10–9	—	13–13	11–9	11–8	14–8
5	(Montenegro) Jadran Carine	14	6	2	6	128	126	+2	20		5–15	4–4	6–14	11–5	—	16–10	7–8	15–7
6	(Romania) Steaua București	14	4	0	10	109	152	−43	12		6–13	3–8	9–17	5–6	4–8	—	10–9	9–8
7	(Spain) CN Sabadell	14	3	0	11	115	174	−59	9		9–18	7–15	5–16	9–11	8–10	10–11	—	12–10
8	(Netherlands) AZC Alphen	14	0	0	14	87	218	−131	0		5–24	4–14	6–17	5–17	7–14	4–15	14–16	—

Source: LEN

== Final Eight ==
7–9 June 2018—Genoa, Italy

Quarterfinals
7 June
(Greece) Olympiacos	6
(Germany) Spandau 04	5
7 June
(Hungary) ZF Eger	4
(Spain) CNA Barceloneta	9
7 June
(Italy) Pro Recco (PSO)	12
(Italy) AN Brescia	10
7 June
(Croatia) Jug CO	9
(Hungary) Szolnoki VSC	8

Semifinals
8 June
(Greece) Olympiacos	6
(Spain) CNA Barceloneta	4
8 June
(Italy) Pro Recco	9
(Croatia) Jug CO	8

Final
9 June
(Greece) Olympiacos	9
(Italy) Pro Recco	7
Third place game
9 June
(Spain) CNA Barceloneta	14
(Croatia) Jug CO	8

5th–8th place bracket

5th–8th place semifinals
8 June
(Germany) Spandau 04	6
(Hungary) ZF Eger	10
8 June
(Italy) AN Brescia	7
(Hungary) Szolnoki VSC	8

Fifth place game
9 June
(Hungary) ZF Eger	6
(Hungary) Szolnoki VSC	10
Seventh place game
9 June
(Germany) Spandau 04	10
(Italy) AN Brescia	14

2017–18 LEN Champions League
Champions

Olympiacos
(2nd title)

Josip Pavić, Emmanouil Mylonakis, Evangelos Delakas, Konstantinos Genidounias, Ioannis Fountoulis, Dimitrios Nikolaidis, Georgios Dervisis, Andro Bušlje, Konstantinos Mourikis, Alexandros Gounas, Stylianos Argyropoulos, Paulo Obradović, Stefanos Galanopoulos, Emmanouil Prekas
Head coach
Thodoris Vlachos

=== Final standings ===
	Team
	(Greece) Olympiacos
Silver medal	(Italy) Pro Recco
Bronze medal	(Spain) CNA Barceloneta
4	(Croatia) Jug CO
5	(Hungary) Szolnoki VSC
6	(Hungary) ZF Eger
7	(Italy) AN Brescia
8	(Germany) Spandau 04

=== Awards ===
Player of the Season	Top Scorer	Player of the Final Eight	Goalkeeper of the Final Eight
(Croatia) Josip Pavić (Olympiacos)	(Montenegro) Darko Brguljan (Waspo'98 Hannover) 42 goals	(Croatia) Josip Pavic (Olympiacos)	(Croatia) Josip Pavic (Olympiacos)

Total 7 of the Season
LW	(Italy) Francesco Di Fulvio (Pro Recco)	CF	(Croatia) Josip Vrlić (Barceloneta)	RW	(Croatia) Maro Joković (Jug)
LD	(Greece) Ioannis Fountoulis (Olympiacos)	CB	(Croatia) Andro Bušlje (Olympiacos)	RD	(Serbia) Dušan Mandić (Pro Recco)
GK	(Croatia) Josip Pavić (Olympiacos)				

== See also ==
- 2017–18 LEN Euro Cup
