= 2017–18 LEN Champions League Final Eight =

Final Eight
- 2018

Tournament information
- Location: (Italy) Genoa
- Dates: 7–9 June 2018
- Teams: 8

Final positions
- Champion: (Greece) Olympiacos
- Runner-up: (Italy) Pro Recco

The 2017–18 LEN Champions League Final Eight is the concluding LEN Champions League tournament of the 2017–18 LEN Champions League season.

== Location ==
2017–18 LEN Champions League Final Eight (Northern Italy)

== Qualified teams ==
Group	Winners	Runners-up	Third	Fourth
A	(Greece) Olympiacos	(Croatia) Jug CO	(Spain) CNA Barceloneta	(Italy) AN Brescia
B	(Italy) Pro Recco	(Hungary) ZF Eger	(Hungary) Szolnoki VSC	(Germany) Spandau 04

== Bracket ==
Quarterfinals
7 June
(Greece) Olympiacos	6
(Germany) Spandau 04	5
7 June
(Hungary) ZF Eger	4
(Spain) CNA Barceloneta	9
7 June
(Italy) Pro Recco (PSO)	12
(Italy) AN Brescia	10
7 June
(Croatia) Jug CO	9
(Hungary) Szolnoki VSC	8

Semifinals
8 June
(Greece) Olympiacos	6
(Spain) CNA Barceloneta	4
8 June
(Italy) Pro Recco	9
(Croatia) Jug CO	8

Final
9 June
(Greece) Olympiacos	9
(Italy) Pro Recco	7
Third place game
9 June
(Spain) CNA Barceloneta	14
(Croatia) Jug CO	8

5th–8th place bracket

5th–8th place semifinals
8 June
(Germany) Spandau 04	6
(Hungary) ZF Eger	10
8 June
(Italy) AN Brescia	7
(Hungary) Szolnoki VSC	8

Fifth place game
9 June
(Hungary) ZF Eger	6
(Hungary) Szolnoki VSC	10
Seventh place game
9 June
(Germany) Spandau 04	10
(Italy) AN Brescia	14

== Quarterfinals ==
7 June 2018; 16:00	Report	Olympiacos (Greece)	6–5	(Germany) Spandau 04	Genoa; Referees: De Jong (NED), Putniković (SRB)
7 June 2018; 16:00	Report	Score by quarters: 2–0, 1–1, 2–3 , 1–1			Genoa; Referees: De Jong (NED), Putniković (SRB)
7 June 2018; 16:00	Report	Genidounias 3	Goals	Dedović 2	Genoa; Referees: De Jong (NED), Putniković (SRB)

7 June 2018; 17:30	Report	ZF Eger (Hungary)	4–9	(Spain) CNA Barceloneta	Genoa; Referees: Margeta (SLO), Naumov (RUS)
7 June 2018; 17:30	Report	Score by quarters: 1–2, 3–3, 0–2, 0–2			Genoa; Referees: Margeta (SLO), Naumov (RUS)
7 June 2018; 17:30	Report	Vlachopoulos 2	Goals	Munarriz 4	Genoa; Referees: Margeta (SLO), Naumov (RUS)

7 June 2018; 19:00	Report	Jug CO (Croatia)	9–8	(Hungary) Szolnoki VSC	Genoa; Referees: Schwartz (ISR), Alexandrescu (ROU)
7 June 2018; 19:00	Report	Score by quarters: 2–2, 2–2, 2–2, 3–2			Genoa; Referees: Schwartz (ISR), Alexandrescu (ROU)
7 June 2018; 19:00	Report	García, Rašović 2	Goals	Bátori, Zalánki 3	Genoa; Referees: Schwartz (ISR), Alexandrescu (ROU)

7 June 2018; 20:30	Report	Pro Recco (Italy)	12–10	(Italy) AN Brescia	Genoa; Referees: Dervieux (FRA), Koryzna (POL)
7 June 2018; 20:30	Report	Score by quarters: 2–1, 2–0, 2–3, 2–4 PSO: 4–2			Genoa; Referees: Dervieux (FRA), Koryzna (POL)
7 June 2018; 20:30	Report	Ivović 3	Goals	Muslim 3	Genoa; Referees: Dervieux (FRA), Koryzna (POL)

== 5th–8th place semifinals ==
8 June 2018; 16:00	Report	Spandau 04 (Germany)	6–10	(Hungary) ZF Eger	Genoa; Referees: Putniković (SRB), Schwartz (ISR)
8 June 2018; 16:00	Report	Score by quarters: 3–2, 0–2, 0–1, 3–5			Genoa; Referees: Putniković (SRB), Schwartz (ISR)
8 June 2018; 16:00	Report	six players 1	Goals	three players 2	Genoa; Referees: Putniković (SRB), Schwartz (ISR)

8 June 2018; 17:30	Report	AN Brescia (Italy)	7–8	(Hungary) Szolnoki VSC	Genoa; Referees: De Jong (NED), Dervieux (FRA)
8 June 2018; 17:30	Report	Score by quarters: 1–1, 1–2, 2–2, 3–3			Genoa; Referees: De Jong (NED), Dervieux (FRA)
8 June 2018; 17:30	Report	Rizzo 3	Goals	three players 2	Genoa; Referees: De Jong (NED), Dervieux (FRA)

== Semifinals ==
8 June 2018; 19:00	Report	Olympiacos (Greece)	6–4	(Spain) CNA Barceloneta	Genoa; Referees: Koryzna (POL), Margeta (SLO)
8 June 2018; 19:00	Report	Score by quarters: 1–1, 2–2, 1–1, 2–0			Genoa; Referees: Koryzna (POL), Margeta (SLO)
8 June 2018; 19:00	Report	Bušlje 2	Goals	four players 1	Genoa; Referees: Koryzna (POL), Margeta (SLO)

8 June 2018; 20:30	Report	Pro Recco (Italy)	9–8	(Croatia) Jug CO	Genoa; Referees: Naumov (RUS), Alexandrescu (ROU)
8 June 2018; 20:30	Report	Score by quarters: 3–2, 1–1, 2–2, 3–3			Genoa; Referees: Naumov (RUS), Alexandrescu (ROU)
8 June 2018; 20:30	Report	Filipović 3	Goals	Fatović 2	Genoa; Referees: Naumov (RUS), Alexandrescu (ROU)

== Seventh place game ==
9 June 2018; 16:00	Report	Spandau 04 (Germany)	10–14	(Italy) AN Brescia	Genoa; Referees: De Jong (NED), Putniković (SRB)
9 June 2018; 16:00	Report	Score by quarters: 4–3, 4–2, 0–5, 2–4			Genoa; Referees: De Jong (NED), Putniković (SRB)
9 June 2018; 16:00	Report	Gielen, Stamm 3	Goals	Rizzo 5	Genoa; Referees: De Jong (NED), Putniković (SRB)

== Fifth place game ==
9 June 2018; 17:30	Report	ZF Eger (Hungary)	6–10	(Hungary) Szolnoki VSC	Genoa; Referees: Dervieux (FRA), Koryzna (POL)
9 June 2018; 17:30	Report	Score by quarters: 1–0, 1–2, 2–4, 2–4			Genoa; Referees: Dervieux (FRA), Koryzna (POL)
9 June 2018; 17:30	Report	Avramović, Bedő 2	Goals	Ćuk 3	Genoa; Referees: Dervieux (FRA), Koryzna (POL)

== Third place game ==
9 June 2018; 19:00	Report	CNA Barceloneta (Spain)	14–8	(Croatia) Jug CO	Genoa; Referees: Naumov (RUS), Schwartz (ISR)
9 June 2018; 19:00	Report	Score by quarters: 4–1, 2–3, 6–3, 2–1			Genoa; Referees: Naumov (RUS), Schwartz (ISR)
9 June 2018; 19:00	Report	Fernández 4	Goals	Čulina, García 3	Genoa; Referees: Naumov (RUS), Schwartz (ISR)

== Final ==
9 June 2018; 20:30	Report	Olympiacos (Greece)	9–7	(Italy) Pro Recco	Genoa; Referees: Margeta (SLO), Alexandrescu (ROU)
9 June 2018; 20:30	Report	Score by quarters: 2–1, 2–3, 3–2, 2–1			Genoa; Referees: Margeta (SLO), Alexandrescu (ROU)
9 June 2018; 20:30	Report	Fountoulis 4	Goals	Di Fulvio 2	Genoa; Referees: Margeta (SLO), Alexandrescu (ROU)

2017–18 LEN Champions League
Champions

Olympiacos
(2nd title)

No.	Position	Nationality	Player
1	GK	(Croatia)	Josip Pavić
2	W	(Greece)	Emmanouil Mylonakis
3	DF	(Greece)	Evangelos Delakas
4	W	(Greece)	Konstantinos Genidounias
5	W	(Greece)	Ioannis Fountoulis
6	CF	(Greece)	Dimitrios Nikolaidis
7	W	(Greece)	Georgios Dervisis
8	DF	(Croatia)	Andro Bušlje
9	CF	(Greece)	Konstantinos Mourikis
10	W	(Greece)	Alexandros Gounas
11	DF	(Greece)	Stylianos Argyropoulos
12	DF	(Croatia)	Paulo Obradović
13	GK	(Greece)	Stefanos Galanopoulos
15	DF	(Greece)	Emmanouil Prekas
Head coach: (Greece) Thodoris Vlachos
