= AS Waterpolis Pescara =

Italian water polo club

Associazione Sportiva Waterpolis Pescara was an Italian water polo club based in Pescara, Abruzzo.

== History ==
Pescara won the 1988 LEN Champions League over against the West German team Spandau 04. They later had multiple wins in Italian Cups and LEN Cup Winners' Cups in the mid-1990s, considered a golden age for the club. In 1996, Pescara won the LEN Trophy and later climbed to the top of the Italian league for two consecutive years in 1997 and 1998. Pescara was unsuccessful at throwing off Savona and mostly Posillipo from the throne of Serie A1 and LEN Champions League. In 1998 Pescara tried to double its European leagues (ten years after the first time) but was defeated 8–6 in the final by its great rival and last European Champion, Posillipo.

At the beginning of the 2009–10 season AS Waterpolis Pescara announced its failure and the withdrawal from all domestic and international leagues.

Notable players include brothers Roberto and Alessandro Calcaterra, Marco D'Altrui, Amedeo Pomilio, Francesco Attolico and Spaniard Manuel Estiarte.

== Honours ==
=== European competitions ===
LEN Champions League

- Winners (1): 1987-88
- Runners-up (1): 1997-98

LEN Cup Winners' Cup

- Winners (3): 1989-90, 1992–93, 1993–94
- Runners-up (1): 1994-95

LEN Trophy

- Winners (1): 1995-96

LEN Super Cup

- Winners (2): 1988, 1993
- Runners-up (2): 1990, 1994

=== Domestic competitions ===
Italian League

- Winners (3): 1986-87, 1996–97, 1997–98

Coppa Italia

- Winners (5): 1984-85, 1985–86, 1988–89, 1991–92, 1997–98
