= 2002–03 LEN Cup Winners' Cup =

- League: Cup Winners' Cup
- Sport: Water Polo
- Duration: 8 November 2002 to 30 March 2003
- Number of teams: 8 (quarter-finals); 15 (Total)
- Finals champions: (Italy) Posillipo (2nd title)
- Runners-up: (Hungary) Vasas

Cup Winners' Cup seasons
- ← 2001–02

The 2002–03 LEN Cup Winners' Cup is the ongoing 29th edition of LEN's second-tier competition for men's water polo clubs.

== Quarter-finals ==
Team 1	Agg.	Team 2	1st leg	2nd leg
Jadran Herceg Novi (Federal Republic of Yugoslavia)	9–10	(Hungary) Vasas	4–5	5–5
Sabadell (Spain)	24–7	(Germany) ASC Duisburg	13–3	11–4
Vouliagmeni (Greece)	13–14	(Italy) Posillipo	7–7	6–7
Spartak Volgograd (Russia)	16–15	(Croatia) Jug Dubrovnik	9–7	7–8

== Semi-finals ==
Team 1	Agg.	Team 2	1st leg	2nd leg
Spartak Volgograd (Russia)	–	(Italy) Posillipo	4–8	–
Vasas (Hungary)	13–12	(Spain) Sabadell	9–6	4–6

== Finals ==
Team 1	Agg.	Team 2	1st leg	2nd leg
Vasas (Hungary)	13–14	(Italy) Posillipo	10–10	3–4

2002-03 Cup Winners' Cup
Champions
(Italy) Posillipo
2nd Title

== See also ==
- 2002–03 LEN Champions League
