= RN Arenzano =

Italian water polo club

- Founded: 1967
- League: Serie A2
- Based in: Arenzano, Italy
- Colors: Green and white
- Championships: 1 LEN Cup Winners' Cup; 3 Italian Cups
- Website: https://www.rarinantesarenzano.it

Rari Nantes Arenzano is an Italian water polo club based in Arenzano, Liguria.

== History ==
RN Arenzano founded on October 18, 1967. Twenty-one years later the club won its first title, the Italian Cup, also the next year, in 1988–89 season participated in LEN Cup Winners' Cup where it reached the final and won the trophy against the Hungarian Spartacus from Budapest.

== Honours ==
- Men
  - Coppa Italia
    - Winners (1): 1987-88
  - LEN Cup Winners' Cup
    - Winners (1): 1988-89
