= CSK VMF Moscow =

- Founded: 1924
- League: 1st Division
- Based in: Moscow, Russia
- Colors: Red and blue
- Championships: 1 European Aquatics Champions League; 2 LEN Cup Winners' Cup; 3 European Aquatics Super Cup; 21 Soviet Leagues; 1 Russian League
- Website: http://www.cska.ru/

CSK VMF Moscow (Russian: ЦСК ВМФ Москва) is the navy section of the multi-sport club CSKA Moscow and its water polo men's team. It won the European Aquatics Champions League, the European Aquatics Super Cup and the LEN Cup Winners' Cup.

== Sports Complex CSK VMF ==
The complex is located in Moscow on the banks of the Khimki reservoir. The CSK VMF sports complex includes: a 50-meter swimming pool, an indoor rowing pool, strength training gyms, a game gym, indoor tennis courts, volleyball and basketball courts, moorings for ships, boats and sports vessels, a sports training base in Serebryany Bor.

== Honours ==
=== Domestic ===
- Soviet League
  - Winners (21) (record): 1944–45, 1945–46, 1948–49, 1953–54, 1963–64, 1964–65, 1965–66, 1969–70, 1970–71, 1974–75, 1975–76, 1976–77, 1977–78, 1979–80, 1982–83, 1983–84, 1987–88, 1988–89, 1989–90, 1990–91, 1991–92
- Soviet Cup
  - Winners (7) (record): 1976–77, 1979–80, 1981–82, 1982–83, 1983–84, 1986–87, 1988–89
- Russian League
  - Winners (1): 1992–93
  - Runners-up (2): 1993–94, 1998–99
- Russian Cup
  - Winners (1): 1992–93

=== European ===
- LEN Champions League
  - Winners (1): 1976–77
  - Runners-up (2): 1977–78, 1984–85
- LEN Cup Winners' Cup
  - Winners (2): 1980–81, 1982–83
- LEN Super Cup
  - Winners (3): 1977, 1981, 1983

=== Individual club awards ===
- Triple Crown
  - Winners (1): 1976–77
- Double
  - Winners (5): 1979–80, 1982–83, 1983–84, 1988–89, 1992–93
