= WPC Dynamo Moscow =

Water polo club based in Moscow and part of multi-sports club Dynamo

Dynamo Moscow
- Founded: 1923
- League: Russian Championship
- Based in: Moscow
- Arena: Dynamo, Moscow
- Colors: Blue, White
- Head coach: Sergey Voronin
- Website: https://dynamo-wp.com/

WPC Dynamo Moscow (ВПК Динамо Москва) is a Russian men's water polo club, that is part of the traditional Moscow-based multi-sports club Dynamo.

== History ==
Dynamo won seven Soviet Championships between 1955 and 1962, and in 1964 it played in the then new European Champions Cup, ranking second behind Partizan. In 1968 and 1969 the team won two more national championships, and it also reached the 1969 European Cup's final, lost to Mladost.

For the next fifteen years Dynamo didn't win any more titles; its best results in the Soviet Championship were 2nd and 3rd positions in three occasions each. 1985 marked the start of a peak in the team's history as Dynamo won its ninth national title and its first European title, the Cup Winners' Cup by beating Jug in the final. In 1986 it defended the national title and won its second Soviet Cup to attain its first national double, and in 1987 it won its third championship in a row and reached the European Cup's final, lost this time to Spandau 04. Dynamo subsequently won three of the last four editions of the Soviet Cup, while ranking second to CSKA Moscow in the league.

Following the dissolution of the Soviet Union Dynamo remained in the lead of the new Russian Championship, winning seven championships and five national cups between 1994 and 2002. In 1999 it reached the Euroleague's Final Four, ranking fourth, and in 2000 it won its second Cup Winners' Cup, beating Florentia in the final. However the team declined; its major successes in subsequent years are two 3rd positions with two 3rd positions in the Russian Championship in 2003 and 2006.

== Titles ==
=== European ===
LEN Cup Winners' Cup

- Winners (2): 1984–85, 1999–2000

=== Domestic ===
Soviet League

- Winners (11): 1954–55, 1956–57, 1957–58, 1959–60, 1960–61, 1961–62, 1967–68, 1968–69, 1984–85, 1985–86, 1986–87

Soviet Cup

- Winners (5): 1948–49, 1985–86, 1987–88, 1989–90, 1990–91

Russian League

- Winners (9): 1993–94, 1994–95, 1995–96, 1997–98, 1999–00, 2000–01, 2001–02, 2017–18, 2018–19

Russian Cup

- Winners (8): 1993–94, 1994–95, 1995–96, 1996–97, 1998–99, 2015–16, 2017–18, 2018–19, 2019–20
