= Alessandro Nora =

Italian water polo player (born 1987)

Personal information
- Nationality: Italian
- Born: 24 May 1987 (age 39) Mirandola, Italy
- Height: 1.92 m (6 ft 4 in)
- Weight: 85 kg (187 lb)

Sport
- Country: Italy
- Sport: Water polo
- Club: AN Brescia
Medal record
Olympic Games
| Bronze medal – third place | 2016 Rio de Janeiro | Team |

Alessandro Nora (born 24 May 1987) is an Italian water polo player, currently playing for AN Brescia. He was part of the Italian team during the Olympic qualification 2016

== See also ==
- List of Olympic medalists in water polo (men)
