= Zsolt Németh (water polo) =

Hungarian water polo player

Personal information
- Nationality: Hungarian
- Born: 15 April 1970 (age 54); Budapest, Hungary

Sport
- Sport: Water polo

Zsolt Németh (born 15 April 1970) is a Hungarian water polo player. He competed in the men's tournament at the 1996 Summer Olympics.
