= Emmanouil Prekas =

Greek water polo player

Manolis Prekas
Personal information
- Nationality: Greek
- Born: 28 February 1996 (age 30) Athens, Greece
- Height: 186 cm (6 ft 1 in)

Sport
- Country: Greece
- Sport: Water polo
- Club: Olympiacos

Emmanouil "Manolis" Prekas (born 28 February 1996) is a Greek water polo player, who is a member of Greece men's national water polo team. He plays for Greek powerhouse Olympiacos, with whom he won the 2017–18 LEN Champions League, 2 Greek Championships and 1 Greek Cup.
