= Russian Water Polo Championship =

Premier Russian water polo league

- Founded: 1992
- Country: Russia
- Confederation: LEN (Europe)
- Number of clubs: 8
- Current champions: Spartak Volgograd (13)
- Most championships: Spartak Volgograd (13)

The premier division of Russian water polo organized by the FVPR (Federacijaa Vodnogo Polo Rossij / Russian Water Polo Federation). First held in 1992-93, it is currently contested by twelve teams. Spartak Volgograd is the most successful club with 13 titles since 1997, followed by Dynamo Moscow with 9.

== Title holders ==
- 1992-93 CSKA Moscow
- 1993-94 Dynamo Moscow
- 1994-95 Dynamo Moscow
- 1995-96 Dynamo Moscow
- 1996-97 Spartak Volgograd
- 1997-98 Dynamo Moscow
- 1998-99 Spartak Volgograd
- 1999-00 Dynamo Moscow
- 2000-01 Dynamo Moscow
- 2001-02 Dynamo Moscow
- 2002-03 Spartak Volgograd
- 2003-04 Spartak Volgograd
- 2004-05 Shturm Ruza
- 2005-06 Shturm Ruza
- 2006-07 Sintez Kazan
- 2007-08 Shturm Ruza
- 2008-09 Shturm Ruza
- 2009-10 Spartak Volgograd
- 2010-11 Spartak Volgograd
- 2011-12 Spartak Volgograd
- 2012-13 Spartak Volgograd
- 2013-14 Spartak Volgograd
- 2014-15 Spartak Volgograd
- 2015-16 Spartak Volgograd
- 2016-17 Spartak Volgograd
- 2017-18 Dynamo Moscow
- 2018-19 Dynamo Moscow
- 2019-20 Sintez Kazan
- 2020-21 Sintez Kazan
- 2021-22 Sintez Kazan
- 2022-23 Spartak Volgograd

== Titles by club ==
Titles	Club	Years won
13	Spartak Volgograd	1996–97, 1998–99, 2002–03, 2003–04, 2009–10, 2010–11, 2011–12, 2012–13, 2013–14, 2014–15, 2015–16, 2016–17, 2022-23
9	Dynamo Moscow	1993-94, 1994-95, 1995-96, 1997-98, 1999-00, 2000-01, 2001-02, 2017-18, 2018-19
4	Shturm Ruza	2004-05, 2005-06, 2007-08, 2008-09
4	Sintez Kazan	2006-07, 2019-20, 2020-21, 2021-22
1	CSKA Moscow	1992-93
