= Sergi Cabanas =

Spanish water polo player (born 1996)

Personal information
- Full name: Sergi Cabanas Pegado
- Nationality: Spanish
- Born: 10 February 1996 (age 30) Barcelona, Spain
- Height: 191 cm (6 ft 3 in)
Medal record
Men's water polo
Representing Spain
World Championships
Gold medal – first place	2025 Singapore	Team
Bronze medal – third place	2023 Fukuoka	Team
Bronze medal – third place	2024 Doha	Team
European Championships
Silver medal – second place	2018 Barcelona	Team
Bronze medal – third place	2022 Split	Team

Sergi Cabanas Pegado (Note: In this Spanish name, the first or paternal surname is Cabanas and the second or maternal family name is Pegado.) (born 10 February 1996) is a Spanish water polo player. He represented Spain at the 2024 Summer Olympics.
