= Dragan Drasković =

Montenegrin water polo player

Personal information
- Nationality: Montenegrin
- Born: 1 September 1988 (age 37) Kotor, Montenegro

Sport
- Sport: Water polo
Medal record
European Championship
Bronze medal – third place	2020 Budapest

Dragan Drasković (Serbian Cyrillic: Драган Драсковић; born 1 September 1988) is a Montenegrin water polo player. He competed in the men's tournament at the 2012 Summer Olympics.
