= LEN Cup Winners' Cup =

The LEN Cup Winners' Cup was a European water polo club competition organized by the Ligue Européenne de Natation. National cup winners qualified for the tournament. After 2003, the nationalcup winners qualified for the LEN Euroleague, and the cup was discontinued.

== Title holders ==
- 1974-75 (Hungary) Ferencváros
- 1975-76 (Socialist Federal Republic of Yugoslavia) Mladost
- 1976-77 (Soviet Union) MGU
- 1977-78 (Hungary) Ferencváros
- 1978-79 (Socialist Federal Republic of Yugoslavia) Korčula
- 1979-80 (Hungary) Ferencváros
- 1980-81 (Soviet Union) CSKA Moscow
- 1981-82 (Socialist Federal Republic of Yugoslavia) POŠK
- 1982-83 (Soviet Union) CSKA Moscow
- 1983-84 (Socialist Federal Republic of Yugoslavia) POŠK
- 1984-85 (Soviet Union) Dynamo Moscow
- 1985-86 (Hungary) Vasas
- 1986-87 (Socialist Federal Republic of Yugoslavia) Mornar
- 1987-88 (Italy) Posillipo
- 1988-89 (Italy) Arenzano
- 1989-90 (Italy) Sisley Pescara
- 1990-91 (Socialist Federal Republic of Yugoslavia) Partizan
- 1991-92 (Spain) Catalunya
- 1992-93 (Italy) Oro d'Abruzzo Pescara
- 1993-94 (Italy) Miglioli Pescara
- 1994-95 (Hungary) Vasas
- 1995-96 (Italy) INA Assitalia Roma
- 1996-97 (Greece) Vouliagmeni
- 1997-98 (Hungary) Ferencváros
- 1998-99 (Croatia) Mladost
- 1999-00 (Russia) Dynamo Moscow
- 2000-01 (Italy) Florentia
- 2001-02 (Hungary) Vasas
- 2002-03 (Italy) Carpisa Posillipo

== Finals ==
Year	Host City	Champion	Runner Up	Final
1974–75; Details		(Hungary) Ferencváros	(Netherlands) Zian	
1975–76; Details		(Socialist Federal Republic of Yugoslavia) Mladost	(Hungary) OSC	
1976–77; Details		(Soviet Union) MGU	(Socialist Federal Republic of Yugoslavia) Primorje	
1977–78; Details		(Hungary) Ferencváros	(Socialist Federal Republic of Yugoslavia) Primorac Kotor	
1978–79; Details		(Socialist Federal Republic of Yugoslavia) Korčula	(Hungary) Ferencváros	
1979–80; Details		(Hungary) Ferencváros	(Socialist Federal Republic of Yugoslavia) POŠK	
1980–81; Details		(Soviet Union) CSKA Moscow	(Hungary) Honvéd	
1981–82; Details		(Socialist Federal Republic of Yugoslavia) POŠK	(Romania) Crișul Oradea	
1982–83; Details		(Soviet Union) CSKA Moscow	(Spain) Montjuïc	
1983–84; Details		(Socialist Federal Republic of Yugoslavia) POŠK	(Hungary) Vasoutas	
1984–85; Details		(Soviet Union) Dynamo Moscow	(Socialist Federal Republic of Yugoslavia) Jug	
1985–86; Details		(Hungary) Vasas	(Romania) Dinamo București	
1986–87; Details		(Socialist Federal Republic of Yugoslavia) Mornar	(Spain) Catalunya	
1987–88; Details		(Italy) Posillipo	(Socialist Federal Republic of Yugoslavia) Jug	
1988–89; Details		(Italy) Arenzano	(Hungary) Spartacus	
1989–90; Details		(Italy) Sisley Pescara	(Soviet Union) Dynamo Moscow	
1990–91; Details		(Socialist Federal Republic of Yugoslavia) Partizan	(Netherlands) Alphen	
1991–92; Details		(Spain) Catalunya	(Italy) Volturno	
1992–93; Details		(Italy) Oro d'Abruzzo Pescara	(Germany) Hohenlimburg	
1993–94; Details		(Italy) Miglioli Pescara	(Spain) Mediterrani	
1994–95; Details		(Hungary) Vasas	(Italy) Pescara	
1995–96; Details		(Italy) INA Assitalia Roma	(Hungary) Vasoutas	
1996–97; Details		(Greece) Vouliagmeni	(Italy) Racing Roma	
1997–98; Details		(Hungary) Ferencváros	(Greece) Olympiacos	
1998–99; Details		(Croatia) Mladost	(Greece) Olympiacos	
1999–00; Details		(Russia) Dynamo Moscow	(Italy) Florentia	
2000–01; Details		(Italy) Florentia	(Spain) Atlètic-Barceloneta	
2001–02; Details		(Hungary) Vasas	(Croatia) Mladost	
2002–03; Details		(Italy) Carpisa Posillipo	(Hungary) Vasas	

== Titles ==
=== By Club ===
Rank	Club	Champion	Finalist
1.	(Hungary) Ferencváros	4; 1974-75, 1977-78, 1979-80, 1997-98	1; 1978-79
2.	(Italy) Pescara	3; 1989-90, 1992-93, 1993-94	1; 1994-95
3.	(Hungary) Vasas	3; 1985-86, 1994-95, 2001-02	1; 2002-03
4.	(Socialist Federal Republic of Yugoslavia) POŠK	2; 1981-82, 1983-84	1; 1979-80
5.	(Croatia) Mladost	2; 1975-76, 1998-99	1; 2001-02
6.	(Russia) Dynamo Moscow	2; 1984-85, 1999-00	1; 1989-90
7.	(Soviet Union) CSKA Moscow	2; 1980-81, 1982-83	
8.	(Italy) Posillipo	2; 1987-88, 2002-03	
9.	(Spain) Catalunya	1; 1991-92	1; 1986-87
10.	(Italy) Racing Roma	1; 1995-96	1; 1996-97
11.	(Italy) Florentia	1; 2000-01	1; 1999-00
12.	(Soviet Union) MGU	1; 1976-77	
13.	(Socialist Federal Republic of Yugoslavia) Korčula	1; 1978-79	
14.	(Socialist Federal Republic of Yugoslavia) Mornar	1; 1986-87	
15.	(Italy) Arenzano	1; 1988-89	
16.	(Socialist Federal Republic of Yugoslavia) Partizan	1; 1990-91	
17.	(Greece) Vouliagmeni	1; 1996-97	
18.	(Socialist Federal Republic of Yugoslavia) Jug		2; 1984-85, 1987-88
19.	(Hungary) Vasoutas		2; 1983-84, 1995-96
20.	(Greece) Olympiacos		2; 1997-98, 1998-99
21.	(Netherlands) Zian		1; 1974-75
22.	(Hungary) OSC		1; 1975-76
23.	(Socialist Federal Republic of Yugoslavia) Primorje		1; 1976-77
24.	(Socialist Federal Republic of Yugoslavia) Primorac Kotor		1; 1977-78
25.	(Hungary) Honvéd		1; 1980-81
26.	(Romania) Crișul Oradea		1; 1981-82
27.	(Spain) Montjuïc		1; 1982-83
28.	(Romania) Dinamo București		1; 1985-86
29.	(Hungary) Spartacus		1; 1988-89
30.	(Netherlands) Alphen		1; 1990-91
31.	(Italy) Volturno		1; 1991-92
32.	(Germany) Hohenlimburg		1; 1992-93
33.	(Spain) Mediterrani		1; 1993-94
34.	(Spain) Atlètic-Barceloneta		1; 2000-01

=== By nation ===
Rank	Nation	Champion	Finalist
1.	Italy	8 Pescara (3), Posillipo (2), Arenzano (1), Roma (1), Florentia (1)	4 Volturno (1), Pescara (1), Roma (1), Florentia (1)
2.	Hungary	7 Ferencváros (4), Vasas (3)	7
