= List of Olympic champions in men's water polo =

This is a list of Olympic champions in men's water polo since the inaugural official edition in 1900.

== Abbreviations ==
Rk	Rank	Ref	Reference			Cap No.	Water polo cap number
Pos	Playing position	FP	Field player	GK	Goalkeeper	ISHOF	International Swimming Hall of Fame
L/R	Handedness	L	Left-handed	R	Right-handed	Oly debut	Olympic debut in water polo
(C)	Captain	p.	page	pp.	pages		

== History ==
Men's water polo tournaments have been staged at the Olympic Games since 1900. Men's water polo was among the first team sports introduced at the modern Olympic Games in 1900. Seven European teams from four countries, including four from the host nation France, took part in the competition. The British team was the inaugural champion. At the 1904 Summer Olympics, a water polo tournament was contested, three club teams of seven players each entered. A German team tried to enter, but its entry was refused because the players did not play for the same club. The event took place in a pond in Forest Park, the location of both the Olympics and the World's Fair. Previously, the International Olympic Committee and International Swimming Federation (FINA) considered the water polo event at the 1904 Olympics as a demonstration sport. However, in July 2021, after accepting the recommendation of Olympic historian Bill Mallon, the IOC recognized water polo along with several others as an official sport of the 1904 Olympic program. Water polo was not played at the 1906 Olympics.

As of the 2020 Summer Olympics, men's water polo teams from ten European countries won all 27 official tournaments.

From 1908 to 1920, the Great Britain men's national water polo team won three consecutive gold medals at the Olympics, becoming the first team to have an Olympic winning streak in water polo.

Hungary is the most successful country in the men's Olympic water polo tournament, with nine Olympic gold medals. The team won three gold medals in a row between 2000 and 2008, becoming the second water polo team to have an Olympic winning streak.

Italy and Yugoslavia have both won three Olympic titles in men's water polo tournament.

The Serbia men's national team is the reigning Olympic champion.

Legend

- D – Debut
- C – Champions
- C – Olympic winning streak (winning three or more Olympic titles in a row)
- – Hosts
- Team^{†} – Defunct team

Champions	00	04	08	12	20	24	28	32	36	48	52	56	60	64	68	72	76	80	84	88	92	96	00	04	08	12	16	20	24	Total
Croatia					Part of Yugoslavia^{†}																	D				C				1
France	D					C																								1
Germany	D						C				East Germany^{†} and West Germany^{†}																			1
Great Britain	C		C	C	C																									4
Hungary				D				C	C		C	C		C			C						C	C	C					9
Italy					D					C			C								C									3
Serbia					Part of Yugoslavia^{†}, then of FR Yugoslavia^{†}, and Serbia and Montenegro^{†}																				D		C	C	C	3
Soviet Union^{†}											D					C		C			Defunct									2
Spain					D																	C								1
Yugoslavia^{†}									D						C				C	C	Defunct									3
Champions	00	04	08	12	20	24	28	32	36	48	52	56	60	64	68	72	76	80	84	88	92	96	00	04	08	12	16	20	24	Total

== Team statistics ==
=== Results ===
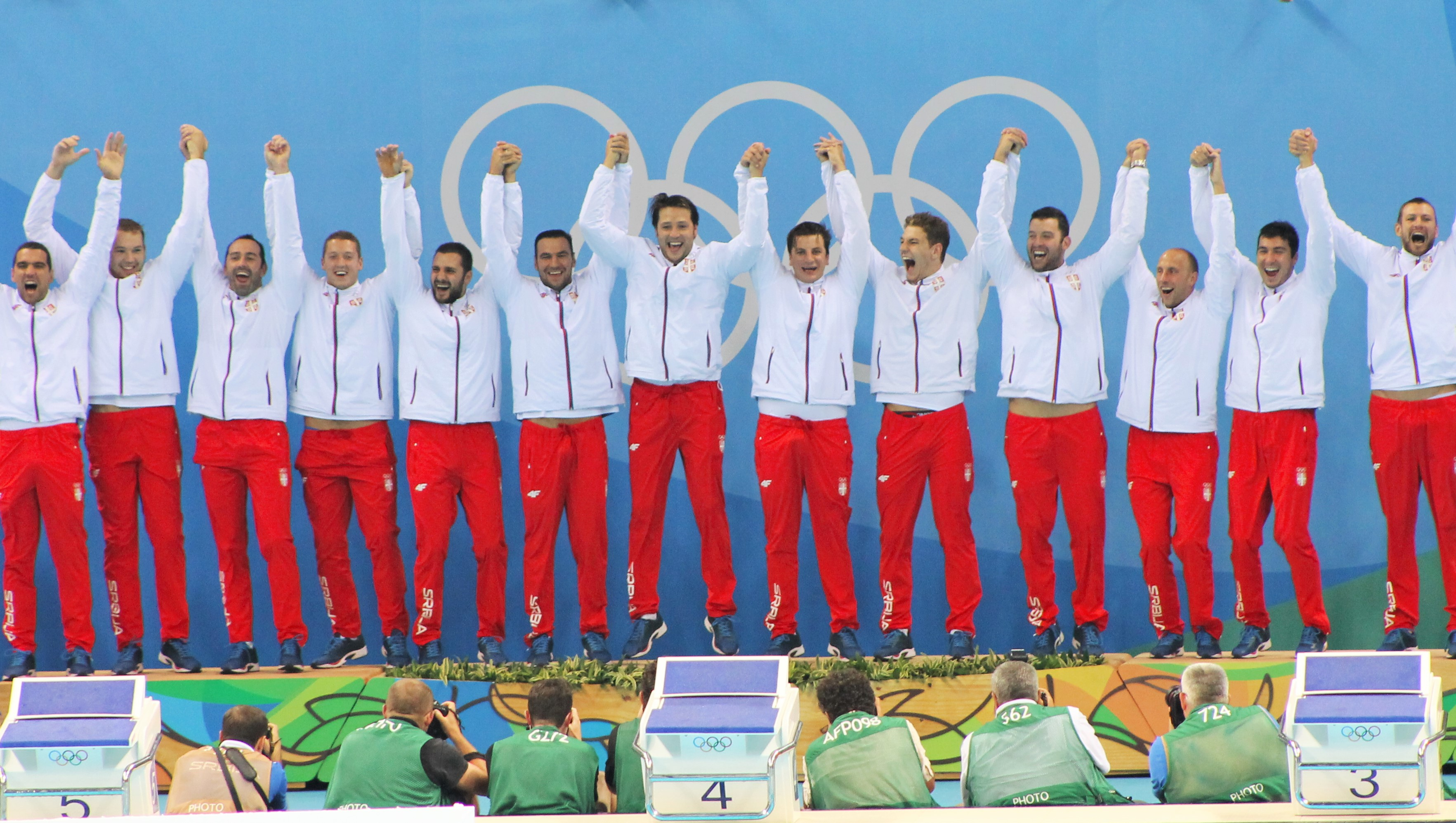
Serbia men's national water polo team celebrated after the gold medal match of the 2016 Summer Olympics.

The following table shows results of Olympic champions in men's water polo by tournament. Last updated: 8 August 2021.

Legend

- 6 – Winning 6 matches during the tournament
- 4 – Drawing 4 matches during the tournament
- 2 – Losing 2 matches during the tournament
- 100.0% – Winning all matches during the tournament
- Team – Olympic winning streak (winning three or more Olympic titles in a row)
- Team – Host team
- Team^{†} – Defunct team

Abbreviation

- MP – Matches played
- W – Won
- D – Drawn
- L – Lost
- GF – Goals for
- GA – Goals against
- GD – Goal difference
- GF/MP – Goals for per match
- GA/MP – Goals against per match
- GD/MP – Goal difference per match

Results of champions by tournament
#	Men's tournament	Champions	MP	W	D	L	Win %	GF	GA	GD	GF/MP	GA/MP	GD/MP
1	Paris 1900	Great Britain (1st title)	3	3	0	0	100.0%	29	3	26	9.667	1.000	8.667
2	St. Louis 1904	Water polo was a demonstration sport											
3	London 1908	Great Britain (2nd title)	1 (Note: Having drawn a bye in the first round and having received a walkover against Austria in the semi-final, the final was the only match that Great Britain played during the tournament.)	1	0	0	100.0%	9	2	7	9.000	2.000	7.000
4	Stockholm 1912	Great Britain (3rd title)	3	3	0	0	100.0%	21	8	13	7.000	2.667	4.333
5	Antwerp 1920	Great Britain (4th title)	3	3	0	0	100.0%	19	4	15	6.333	1.333	5.000
6	Paris 1924	France (1st title)	4	4	0	0	100.0%	16	6	10	4.000	1.500	2.500
7	Amsterdam 1928	Germany (1st title)	3	3	0	0	100.0%	18	10	8	6.000	3.333	2.667
8	Los Angeles 1932	Hungary (1st title)	3 (Note: At the 1932 Olympics, Brazil was disqualified after their players attacked the Hungarian referee at the end of their match against Germany. Their two matches were annulled. Therefore, Hungary and Japan won their games scheduled with Brazil, by forfeit. For more details, please see the Official Report of the 1932 Olympic Games (pp. 650–651), and here.)	3	0	0	100.0%	30	2	28	10.000	0.667	9.333
9	Berlin 1936	Hungary (2nd title)	7	6	1	0	85.7%	44	4	40	6.286	0.571	5.714
10	London 1948	Italy (1st title)	7 (Note: At the 1948 Olympics, the water polo match between Italy and Yugoslavia in Group D was replayed. For more details, please see here.)	6	1	0	85.7%	35	14	21	5.000	2.000	3.000
11	Helsinki 1952	Hungary (3rd title)	8	6	2	0	75.0%	53	16	37	6.625	2.000	4.625
12	Melbourne 1956	Hungary (4th title)	6	6	0	0	100.0%	26	4	22	4.333	0.667	3.667
13	Rome 1960	Italy (2nd title)	7	6	1	0	85.7%	31	12	19	4.429	1.714	2.714
14	Tokyo 1964	Hungary (5th title)	6	5	1	0	83.3%	34	13	21	5.667	2.167	3.500
15	Mexico City 1968	Yugoslavia^{†} (1st title)	9	7	1	1	77.8%	86	35	51	9.556	3.889	5.667
16	Munich 1972	Soviet Union^{†} (1st title)	8	6	2	0	75.0%	48	24	24	6.000	3.000	3.000
17	Montreal 1976	Hungary (6th title)	8	7	1	0	87.5%	45	32	13	5.625	4.000	1.625
18	Moscow 1980	Soviet Union^{†} (2nd title)	8	8	0	0	100.0%	58	31	27	7.250	3.875	3.375
19	Los Angeles 1984	Yugoslavia^{†} (2nd title)	7	6	1	0	85.7%	72	44	28	10.286	6.286	4.000
20	Seoul 1988	Yugoslavia^{†} (3rd title)	7	6	0	1	85.7%	83	55	28	11.857	7.857	4.000
21	Barcelona 1992	Italy (3rd title)	7	5	2	0	71.4%	59	50	9	8.429	7.143	1.286
22	Atlanta 1996	Spain (1st title)	8	6	0	2	75.0%	58	48	10	7.250	6.000	1.250
23	Sydney 2000	Hungary (7th title)	8	6	0	2	75.0%	78	57	21	9.750	7.125	2.625
24	Athens 2004	Hungary (8th title)	7	7	0	0	100.0%	59	39	20	8.429	5.571	2.857
25	Beijing 2008	Hungary (9th title)	7	6	1	0	85.7%	85	55	30	12.143	7.857	4.286
26	London 2012	Croatia (1st title)	8	8	0	0	100.0%	73	42	31	9.125	5.250	3.875
27	Rio 2016	Serbia (1st title)	8	5	2	1	62.5%	80	66	14	10.000	8.250	1.750
28	Tokyo 2020	Serbia (2nd title)	8	6	0	2	75.0%	103	71	32	12.875	8.875	4.000
29	Paris 2024	Serbia (3rd title)	8	5	0	3	62.5%	93	91	2	11.625	11.375	0.250
#	Men's tournament	Total	177	148	16	12	84.2%	1445	838	607	7.638	4.734	3.429
#	Men's tournament	Champions	MP	W	D	L	Win %	GF	GA	GD	GF/MP	GA/MP	GD/MP

Sources:

- Official Reports (PDF): 1900–1996 (men's tournaments);
- Official Results Books (PDF): 2000 (pp. 45–92), 2004 (p. 207), 2008 (p. 202), 2012 (p. 471), 2016 (p. 131), 2020 (p. 150);
- Olympedia: 1900–2020 (men's tournaments);
- Sports Reference: 1900–2016 (men's tournaments).

From 1900 to 1928, single-elimination tournaments were used to determine Olympic champions in men's water polo. The following table shows men's teams that won all matches during the Olympic tournament since 1932.

Winning all matches during the tournament (since 1932)
#	Year	Champions	MP	W	D	L	Win %
1	1932	Hungary (1st title)	3	3	0	0	100.0%
2	1956	Hungary (4th title)	6	6	0	0	100.0%
3	1980	Soviet Union^{†} (2nd title)	8	8	0	0	100.0%
4	2004	Hungary (8th title)	7	7	0	0	100.0%
5	2012	Croatia (1st title)	8	8	0	0	100.0%

The following tables show records of goals for per match.

Top 5 most goals for per match
Rk	Year	Champions	MP	GF	GF/MP
1	2020	Serbia (2nd title)	8	103	12.875
2	2008	Hungary (9th title)	7	85	12.143
3	1988	Yugoslavia^{†} (3rd title)	7	83	11.857
4	2024	Serbia (3rd title)	8	93	11.625
5	1984	Yugoslavia^{†} (2nd title)	7	72	10.286

Top 5 fewest goals for per match
Rk	Year	Champions	MP	GF	GF/MP
1	1924	France (1st title)	4	16	4.000
2	1956	Hungary (4th title)	6	26	4.333
3	1960	Italy (2nd title)	7	31	4.429
4	1948	Italy (1st title)	7	35	5.000
5	1976	Hungary (6th title)	8	45	5.625

Historical progression of records: Goals for per match
Goals for per match	Achievement	Year	Champions	Date of winning gold	Duration of record
9.667	Set record	1900	Great Britain (1st title)	12 August 1900	32 years, 1 day
10.000	Broke record	1932	Hungary (1st title)	13 August 1932	51 years, 363 days
10.286	Broke record	1984	Yugoslavia^{†} (2nd title)	10 August 1984	4 years, 52 days
11.857	Broke record	1988	Yugoslavia^{†} (3rd title)	1 October 1988	19 years, 328 days
12.143	Broke record	2008	Hungary (9th title)	24 August 2008	12 years, 349 days
12.875	Broke record	2020	Serbia (2nd title)	8 August 2021	5 years, 100 days

The following tables show records of goals against per match.

Top 5 most goals against per match
Rk	Year	Champions	MP	GA	GA/MP
1	2024	Serbia (3rd title)	8	91	11.375
2	2020	Serbia (2nd title)	8	71	8.875
3	2016	Serbia (1st title)	8	66	8.250
4	1988	Yugoslavia^{†} (3rd title)	7	55	7.857
4	2008	Hungary (9th title)	7	55	7.857

Top 5 fewest goals against per match
Rk	Year	Champions	MP	GA	GA/MP
1	1936	Hungary (2nd title)	7	4	0.571
2	1932	Hungary (1st title)	3	2	0.667
2	1956	Hungary (4th title)	6	4	0.667
4	1900	Great Britain (1st title)	3	3	1.000
5	1920	Great Britain (4th title)	3	4	1.333

The following tables show records of goal difference per match.

Top 5 most goal difference per match
Rk	Year	Champions	MP	GD	GD/MP
1	1932	Hungary (1st title)	3	28	9.333
2	1900	Great Britain (1st title)	3	26	8.667
3	1908	Great Britain (2nd title)	1	7	7.000
4	1936	Hungary (2nd title)	7	40	5.714
5	1968	Yugoslavia^{†} (1st title)	9	51	5.667

Top 5 fewest goal difference per match
Rk	Year	Champions	MP	GD	GD/MP
1	2024	Serbia (3rd title)	8	2	0.250
2	1996	Spain (1st title)	8	10	1.250
3	1992	Italy (3rd title)	7	9	1.286
4	1976	Hungary (6th title)	8	13	1.625
5	2016	Serbia (1st title)	8	14	1.750

=== Squads ===
The following table shows number of players and average age, height and weight of Olympic champions in men's water polo by tournament. Last updated: 30 August 2021.

Legend

- Team – Olympic winning streak
- Team – Winning all matches during the tournament
- Team – Host team
- Team^{†} – Defunct team

Winning squads by tournament
#	Men's tournament	Champions	Players	Returning Olympians		Average		
#	Men's tournament	Champions	Number	Number	%	Age	Height	Weight
1	Paris 1900	Great Britain (1st title)	7	0	0.0%			
2	St. Louis 1904	Water polo was a demonstration sport						
3	London 1908	Great Britain (2nd title)	7	0	0.0%	26 years, 111 days		
4	Stockholm 1912	Great Britain (3rd title)	7	4	57.1%	29 years, 16 days		
5	Antwerp 1920	Great Britain (4th title)	7	3	42.9%	33 years, 279 days		
6	Paris 1924	France (1st title)	7	3	42.9%	26 years, 303 days		
7	Amsterdam 1928	Germany (1st title)	8	0	0.0%	24 years, 329 days		
8	Los Angeles 1932	Hungary (1st title)	10	7	70.0%	27 years, 291 days		
9	Berlin 1936	Hungary (2nd title)	11	5	45.5%	26 years, 66 days		
10	London 1948	Italy (1st title)	9	0	0.0%	30 years, 203 days		
11	Helsinki 1952	Hungary (3rd title)	13	6	46.2%	26 years, 337 days		
12	Melbourne 1956	Hungary (4th title)	12	7	58.3%	26 years, 148 days	1.81 m (5 ft 11 in) (Note: Average height of 9 players.)	80 kg (176 lb) (Note: Average weight of 8 players.)
13	Rome 1960	Italy (2nd title)	12	3	25.0%	22 years, 363 days	1.82 m (6 ft 0 in)	81 kg (179 lb)
14	Tokyo 1964	Hungary (5th title)	12	10	83.3%	28 years, 208 days	1.82 m (6 ft 0 in)	82 kg (181 lb)
15	Mexico City 1968	Yugoslavia^{†} (1st title)	11	5	45.5%	26 years, 151 days	1.90 m (6 ft 3 in)	94 kg (207 lb)
16	Munich 1972	Soviet Union^{†} (1st title)	11	5	45.5%	26 years, 351 days	1.84 m (6 ft 0 in)	87 kg (192 lb)
17	Montreal 1976	Hungary (6th title)	11	6	54.5%	25 years, 333 days	1.87 m (6 ft 2 in)	88 kg (194 lb)
18	Moscow 1980	Soviet Union^{†} (2nd title)	11	4	36.4%	25 years, 117 days	1.84 m (6 ft 0 in)	87 kg (192 lb)
19	Los Angeles 1984	Yugoslavia^{†} (2nd title)	13	3	23.1%	23 years, 362 days	1.93 m (6 ft 4 in)	92 kg (203 lb)
20	Seoul 1988	Yugoslavia^{†} (3rd title)	13	6	46.2%	23 years, 341 days	1.95 m (6 ft 5 in)	94 kg (207 lb)
21	Barcelona 1992	Italy (3rd title)	13	7	53.8%	26 years, 224 days	1.86 m (6 ft 1 in) (Note: Average height of 11 players.)	81 kg (179 lb) (Note: Average weight of 11 players.)
22	Atlanta 1996	Spain (1st title)	13	9	69.2%	26 years, 279 days	1.86 m (6 ft 1 in)	81 kg (179 lb)
23	Sydney 2000	Hungary (7th title)	13	5	38.5%	25 years, 254 days	1.93 m (6 ft 4 in)	93 kg (205 lb)
24	Athens 2004	Hungary (8th title)	13	10	76.9%	27 years, 344 days	1.96 m (6 ft 5 in)	96 kg (212 lb)
25	Beijing 2008	Hungary (9th title)	13	9	69.2%	29 years, 248 days	1.96 m (6 ft 5 in)	100 kg (220 lb)
26	London 2012	Croatia (1st title)	13	8	61.5%	29 years, 85 days	1.97 m (6 ft 6 in)	102 kg (225 lb)
27	Rio 2016	Serbia (1st title)	13	9	69.2%	28 years, 205 days	1.95 m (6 ft 5 in)	96 kg (212 lb)
28	Tokyo 2020	Serbia (2nd title)	13	10	76.9%	31 years, 250 days	1.94 m (6 ft 4 in)	95 kg (209 lb)
#	Men's tournament	Champions	Number	Number	%	Age	Height	Weight
#	Men's tournament	Champions	Players	Returning Olympians		Average		

Sources:

- Official Reports (PDF): 1900–1996 (men's tournaments);
- Official Results Books (PDF): 2000 (pp. 45–92), 2004 (p. 208), 2008 (p. 203), 2012 (p. 472), 2016 (p. 132), 2020 (p. 151);
- Olympedia: 1900–2020 (men's tournaments);
- Sports Reference: 1900–2016 (men's tournaments).

The following tables show records of the number of returning Olympians.

Records – number of returning Olympians (in descending order)
Rk	Year	Champions	Players	Returning Olympians	
Rk	Year	Champions	Number	Number	%
1	1964	Hungary (5th title)	12	10	83.3%
2	2004	Hungary (8th title)	13	10	76.9%
2	2020	Serbia (2nd title)	13	10	76.9%
4	1932	Hungary (1st title)	10	7	70.0%
5	1996	Spain (1st title)	13	9	69.2%
5	2008	Hungary (9th title)	13	9	69.2%
5	2016	Serbia (1st title)	13	9	69.2%

Records – number of returning Olympians (in ascending order)
Rk	Year	Champions	Players	Returning Olympians	
Rk	Year	Champions	Number	Number	%
1	1948	Italy (1st title)	9	0	0.0%
2	1928	Germany (1st title)	8	0	0.0%
3	1900	Great Britain (1st title)	7	0	0.0%
3	1908	Great Britain (2nd title)	7	0	0.0%
5	1984	Yugoslavia^{†} (2nd title)	13	3	23.1%

The following tables show records of average age.

Top 5 oldest winning squads
Rk	Year	Champions	Average age	Note
1	1920	Great Britain (4th title)	33 years, 279 days	The Games after World War I
2	2020	Serbia (2nd title)	31 years, 250 days	The Games postponed to 2021
3	1948	Italy (1st title)	30 years, 203 days	The Games after World War II
4	2008	Hungary (9th title)	29 years, 248 days	
5	2012	Croatia (1st title)	29 years, 85 days	

Top 5 youngest winning squads
Rk	Year	Champions	Average age
1	1960	Italy (2nd title)	22 years, 363 days
2	1988	Yugoslavia^{†} (3rd title)	23 years, 341 days
3	1984	Yugoslavia^{†} (2nd title)	23 years, 362 days
4	1928	Germany (1st title)	24 years, 329 days
5	1980	Soviet Union^{†} (2nd title)	25 years, 117 days

The following tables show records of average height.

Top 5 tallest winning squads (statistics since 1956)
Rk	Year	Champions	Average height
1	2012	Croatia (1st title)	1.97 m (6 ft 6 in)
2	2004	Hungary (8th title)	1.96 m (6 ft 5 in)
2	2008	Hungary (9th title)	1.96 m (6 ft 5 in)
4	1988	Yugoslavia^{†} (3rd title)	1.95 m (6 ft 5 in)
4	2016	Serbia (1st title)	1.95 m (6 ft 5 in)

Top 5 shortest winning squads (statistics since 1956)
Rk	Year	Champions	Average height
1	1956	Hungary (4th title)	1.81 m (5 ft 11 in)
2	1960	Italy (2nd title)	1.82 m (6 ft 0 in)
2	1964	Hungary (5th title)	1.82 m (6 ft 0 in)
4	1972	Soviet Union^{†} (1st title)	1.84 m (6 ft 0 in)
4	1980	Soviet Union^{†} (2nd title)	1.84 m (6 ft 0 in)

Historical progression of records: Average height (statistics since 1956)
Average height	Achievement	Year	Champions	Date of winning gold	Duration of record
1.81 m (5 ft 11 in)	Set record	1956	Hungary (4th title)	7 December 1956	3 years, 271 days
1.82 m (6 ft 0 in)	Broke record	1960	Italy (2nd title)	3 September 1960	8 years, 53 days
1.82 m (6 ft 0 in)	Tied record	1964	Hungary (5th title)	18 October 1964	8 years, 53 days
1.90 m (6 ft 3 in)	Broke record	1968	Yugoslavia^{†} (1st title)	26 October 1968	15 years, 289 days
1.93 m (6 ft 4 in)	Broke record	1984	Yugoslavia^{†} (2nd title)	10 August 1984	4 years, 52 days
1.95 m (6 ft 5 in)	Broke record	1988	Yugoslavia^{†} (3rd title)	1 October 1988	15 years, 333 days
1.96 m (6 ft 5 in)	Broke record	2004	Hungary (8th title)	29 August 2004	7 years, 349 days
1.96 m (6 ft 5 in)	Tied record	2008	Hungary (9th title)	24 August 2008	7 years, 349 days
1.97 m (6 ft 6 in)	Broke record	2012	Croatia (1st title)	12 August 2012	14 years, 96 days

The following tables show records of average weight.

Top 5 heaviest winning squads (statistics since 1956)
Rk	Year	Champions	Average weight
1	2012	Croatia (1st title)	102 kg (225 lb)
2	2008	Hungary (9th title)	100 kg (220 lb)
3	2004	Hungary (8th title)	96 kg (212 lb)
3	2016	Serbia (1st title)	96 kg (212 lb)
5	2020	Serbia (2nd title)	95 kg (209 lb)

Top 5 lightest winning squads (statistics since 1956)
Rk	Year	Champions	Average weight
1	1956	Hungary (4th title)	80 kg (176 lb)
2	1960	Italy (2nd title)	81 kg (179 lb)
2	1992	Italy (3rd title)	81 kg (179 lb)
2	1996	Spain (1st title)	81 kg (179 lb)
5	1964	Hungary (5th title)	82 kg (181 lb)

Historical progression of records: Average weight (statistics since 1956)
Average weight	Achievement	Year	Champions	Date of winning gold	Duration of record
80 kg (176 lb)	Set record	1956	Hungary (4th title)	7 December 1956	3 years, 271 days
81 kg (179 lb)	Broke record	1960	Italy (2nd title)	3 September 1960	4 years, 45 days
82 kg (181 lb)	Broke record	1964	Hungary (5th title)	18 October 1964	4 years, 8 days
94 kg (207 lb)	Broke record	1968	Yugoslavia^{†} (1st title)	26 October 1968	35 years, 308 days
94 kg (207 lb)	Tied record	1988	Yugoslavia^{†} (3rd title)	1 October 1988	35 years, 308 days
96 kg (212 lb)	Broke record	2004	Hungary (8th title)	29 August 2004	3 years, 361 days
100 kg (220 lb)	Broke record	2008	Hungary (9th title)	24 August 2008	3 years, 354 days
102 kg (225 lb)	Broke record	2012	Croatia (1st title)	12 August 2012	14 years, 96 days

=== Olympic and world champions (teams) ===
The following table is pre-sorted by number of Olympic titles (in descending order), number of world titles (in descending order), name of the team (in ascending order), respectively. Last updated: 24 July 2025.

As of the 2020 Summer Olympics, there are seven men's national water polo teams that won gold medals at the Summer Olympics and the World Aquatics Championships.

Legend

- Year^{*} – As host team
- Team^{†} – Defunct team

#	Champions	Olympic title	World title	Total	First	Last
1	Hungary	9 (1932–1936, 1952–1956, 1964, 1976, 2000–2004–2008)	4 (1973, 2003, 2013, 2023)	13	1932	2023
2	Italy	3 (1948, 1960^{*}, 1992)	4 (1978, 1994^{*}, 2011, 2019)	7	1948	2019
3	Serbia	3 (2016–2020–2024)	2 (2009, 2015)	5	2009	2024
3	Yugoslavia^{†}	3 (1968, 1984–1988)	2 (1986–1991)	5	1968	1991
5	Soviet Union^{†}	2 (1972, 1980^{*})	2 (1975, 1982)	4	1972	1982
6	Spain	1 (1996)	4 (1998–2001, 2022, 2025)	5	1996	2025
7	Croatia	1 (2012)	3 (2007, 2017, 2024)	4	2007	2024

== Player statistics ==
=== Age records ===
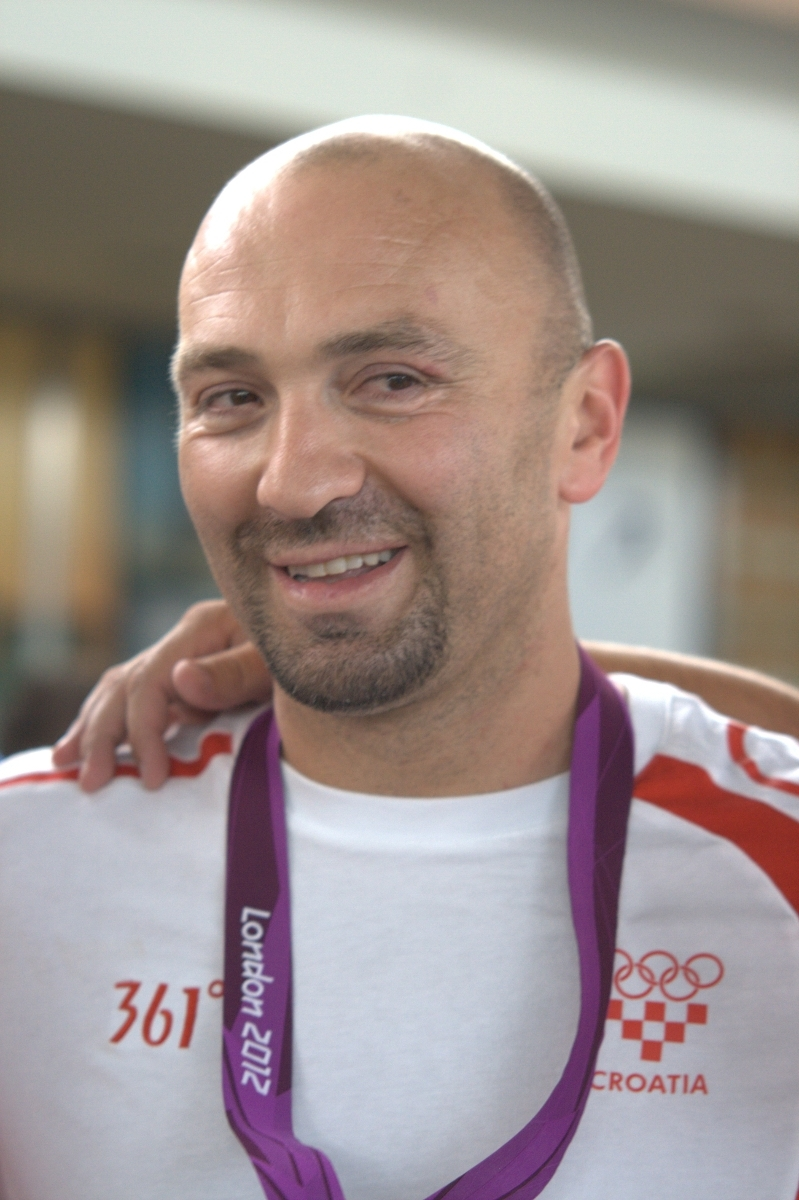
38-year-old Samir Barać was the captain of Croatia at the 2012 Olympics.

The following tables show the oldest and youngest male Olympic champions in water polo. Last updated: 12 September 2021.

Legend

- Team – Host team

Top 10 oldest male Olympic champions in water polo
Rk	Player	Age of winning gold	Men's team	Pos	Date of birth	Date of winning gold
1	Charles Smith	41 years, 216 days	Great Britain	GK	26 January 1879	29 August 1920
2	William Henry	41 years, 45 days	Great Britain	GK	28 June 1859	12 August 1900
3	Samir Barać	38 years, 284 days	Croatia	FP	2 November 1973	12 August 2012
4	Mario Majoni	38 years, 72 days	Italy	FP	27 May 1910	7 August 1948
5	Gojko Pijetlović	38 years, 1 day	Serbia	GK	7 August 1983	8 August 2021
6	István Barta	37 years, 0 days	Hungary	GK	13 August 1895	13 August 1932
7	Dezső Gyarmati	36 years, 361 days	Hungary	FP	23 October 1927	18 October 1964
8	Igor Hinić	36 years, 252 days	Croatia	FP	4 December 1975	12 August 2012
9	Frano Vićan	36 years, 201 days	Croatia	GK	24 January 1976	12 August 2012
10	Branislav Mitrović	36 years, 190 days	Serbia	GK	30 January 1985	8 August 2021
Rk	Player	Age of winning gold	Men's team	Pos	Date of birth	Date of winning gold

Top 10 youngest male Olympic champions in water polo
Rk	Player	Age of winning gold	Men's team	Pos	Date of birth	Date of winning gold
1	György Kárpáti	17 years, 40 days	Hungary	FP	23 June 1935	2 August 1952
2	Perica Bukić	18 years, 172 days	Yugoslavia	FP	20 February 1966	10 August 1984
3	Igor Milanović	18 years, 236 days	Yugoslavia	FP	18 December 1965	10 August 1984
4	Franco Lavoratori	19 years, 172 days	Italy	FP	15 March 1941	3 September 1960
5	Nikola Jakšić	19 years, 216 days	Serbia	FP	17 January 1997	20 August 2016
6	Fritz Gunst	19 years, 324 days	Germany	FP	22 September 1908	11 August 1928
7	Giorgi Mshvenieradze	19 years, 352 days	Soviet Union	FP	12 August 1960	29 July 1980
8	György Kenéz	20 years, 34 days	Hungary	FP	23 June 1956	27 July 1976
9	Antal Bolvári	20 years, 88 days	Hungary	FP	6 May 1932	2 August 1952
10	Mirko Vičević	20 years, 93 days	Yugoslavia	FP	30 June 1968	1 October 1988
Rk	Player	Age of winning gold	Men's team	Pos	Date of birth	Date of winning gold

=== Multiple gold medalists ===
The following tables are pre-sorted by year of receiving the last Olympic gold medal (in ascending order), year of receiving the first Olympic gold medal (in ascending order), name of the player (in ascending order), respectively. Last updated: 12 September 2021.

Ten male athletes won three Olympic gold medals in water polo.

Legend

- Year^{*} – As host team

Male athletes who won three or more Olympic gold medals in water polo
Year	Player	Date of birth	Height	Men's team	Pos	Olympic titles	Age of first/last
1920	Paul Radmilovic	5 March 1886	1.80 m (5 ft 11 in)	Great Britain	FP	1908^{*}–1912–1920	22/34
1920	Charles Smith	26 January 1879	1.86 m (6 ft 1 in)	Great Britain	GK	1908^{*}–1912–1920	29/41
1964	Dezső Gyarmati	23 October 1927	1.86 m (6 ft 1 in)	Hungary	FP	1952–1956, 1964	24/36
1964	György Kárpáti	23 June 1935	1.67 m (5 ft 6 in)	Hungary	FP	1952–1956, 1964	17/29
2008	Tibor Benedek	12 July 1972	1.90 m (6 ft 3 in)	Hungary	FP	2000–2004–2008	28/36
2008	Péter Biros	5 April 1976	1.96 m (6 ft 5 in)	Hungary	FP	2000–2004–2008	24/32
2008	Tamás Kásás	20 July 1976	2.00 m (6 ft 7 in)	Hungary	FP	2000–2004–2008	24/32
2008	Gergely Kiss	21 September 1977	1.98 m (6 ft 6 in)	Hungary	FP	2000–2004–2008	23/30
2008	Tamás Molnár	2 August 1975	1.93 m (6 ft 4 in)	Hungary	FP	2000–2004–2008	25/33
2008	Zoltán Szécsi	22 December 1977	1.98 m (6 ft 6 in)	Hungary	GK	2000–2004–2008	22/30
2024	Sava Ranđelović	17 July 1993	1.93 m (6 ft 4 in)	Serbia	FP	2016–2020–2024	23/31
2024	Dušan Mandić	16 June 1994	2.02 m (6 ft 8 in)	Serbia	FP	2016–2020–2024	22/30
2024	Nikola Jakšić	17 January 1997	1.96 m (6 ft 5 in)	Serbia	FP	2016–2020–2024	19/27
Year	Player	Date of birth	Height	Men's team	Pos	Olympic titles	Age of first/last

Forty-one male athletes won two Olympic gold medals in water polo.

Legend

- Year^{*} – As host team

Male athletes who won two Olympic gold medals in water polo
Year	Player	Date of birth	Height	Men's team	Pos	Olympic titles	Age of first/last
1912	George Cornet	15 July 1877	1.91 m (6 ft 3 in)	Great Britain	FP	1908^{*}–1912	31/35
1912	George Wilkinson	3 March 1879	1.73 m (5 ft 8 in)	Great Britain	FP	1908^{*}–1912	29/33
1920	Charles Bugbee	29 August 1887	1.91 m (6 ft 3 in)	Great Britain	FP	1912–1920	25/33
1936	György Bródy	21 July 1908	1.85 m (6 ft 1 in)	Hungary	GK	1932–1936	24/28
1936	Olivér Halassy	31 July 1909		Hungary	FP	1932–1936	23/27
1936	Márton Homonnai	5 February 1906		Hungary	FP	1932–1936	26/30
1936	János Németh	12 June 1906		Hungary	FP	1932–1936	26/30
1936	Miklós Sárkány	15 August 1908		Hungary	FP	1932–1936	23/28
1956	Antal Bolvári	6 May 1932		Hungary	FP	1952–1956	20/24
1956	László Jeney	30 May 1923	1.81 m (5 ft 11 in)	Hungary	GK	1952–1956	29/33
1956	Kálmán Markovits	26 August 1931	1.78 m (5 ft 10 in)	Hungary	FP	1952–1956	20/25
1956	Miklós Martin	29 June 1931		Hungary	FP	1952–1956	21/25
1956	István Szívós Sr.	20 August 1920	1.85 m (6 ft 1 in)	Hungary	FP	1952–1956	31/36
1964	Ottó Boros	5 August 1929	1.86 m (6 ft 1 in)	Hungary	GK	1956, 1964	27/35
1964	Tivadar Kanizsa	4 April 1933	1.80 m (5 ft 11 in)	Hungary	FP	1956, 1964	23/31
1964	Mihály Mayer	27 December 1933	1.85 m (6 ft 1 in)	Hungary	FP	1956, 1964	22/30
1980	Aleksei Barkalov	18 February 1946	1.80 m (5 ft 11 in)	Soviet Union	FP	1972, 1980^{*}	26/34
1980	Aleksandr Kabanov	11 June 1948	1.81 m (5 ft 11 in)	Soviet Union	FP	1972, 1980^{*}	24/32
1980	Viacheslav Sobchenko	18 April 1949	1.87 m (6 ft 2 in)	Soviet Union	GK	1972, 1980^{*}	23/31
1988	Dragan Andrić	6 June 1962	1.92 m (6 ft 4 in)	Yugoslavia	FP	1984–1988	22/26
1988	Perica Bukić	20 February 1966	1.98 m (6 ft 6 in)	Yugoslavia	FP	1984–1988	18/22
1988	Veselin Đuho	5 January 1960	1.87 m (6 ft 2 in)	Yugoslavia	FP	1984–1988	24/28
1988	Deni Lušić	14 April 1962	1.90 m (6 ft 3 in)	Yugoslavia	FP	1984–1988	22/26
1988	Igor Milanović	18 December 1965	1.95 m (6 ft 5 in)	Yugoslavia	FP	1984–1988	18/22
1988	Tomislav Paškvalin	29 August 1961	2.04 m (6 ft 8 in)	Yugoslavia	FP	1984–1988	22/27
2004	Rajmund Fodor	21 February 1976	1.90 m (6 ft 3 in)	Hungary	FP	2000–2004	24/28
2004	Barnabás Steinmetz	6 October 1975	1.96 m (6 ft 5 in)	Hungary	FP	2000–2004	24/28
2004	Attila Vári	26 February 1976	2.00 m (6 ft 7 in)	Hungary	FP	2000–2004	24/28
2008	István Gergely	20 August 1976	2.01 m (6 ft 7 in)	Hungary	GK	2004–2008	28/32
2008	Norbert Madaras	1 December 1979	1.91 m (6 ft 3 in)	Hungary	FP	2004–2008	24/28
2008	Tamás Varga	14 July 1975	2.01 m (6 ft 7 in)	Hungary	FP	2004–2008	29/33
2020	Milan Aleksić	13 May 1986	1.93 m (6 ft 4 in)	Serbia	FP	2016–2020	30/35
2020	Filip Filipović	2 May 1987	1.96 m (6 ft 5 in)	Serbia	FP	2016–2020	29/34
2020	Nikola Jakšić	17 January 1997	1.97 m (6 ft 6 in)	Serbia	FP	2016–2020	19/24
2020	Dušan Mandić	16 June 1994	2.02 m (6 ft 8 in)	Serbia	FP	2016–2020	22/27
2020	Branislav Mitrović	30 January 1985	2.01 m (6 ft 7 in)	Serbia	GK	2016–2020	31/36
2020	Stefan Mitrović	29 March 1988	1.95 m (6 ft 5 in)	Serbia	FP	2016–2020	28/33
2020	Duško Pijetlović	25 April 1985	1.97 m (6 ft 6 in)	Serbia	FP	2016–2020	31/36
2020	Gojko Pijetlović	7 August 1983	1.94 m (6 ft 4 in)	Serbia	GK	2016–2020	33/38
2020	Andrija Prlainović	28 April 1987	1.87 m (6 ft 2 in)	Serbia	FP	2016–2020	29/34
2020	Sava Ranđelović	17 July 1993	1.93 m (6 ft 4 in)	Serbia	FP	2016–2020	23/28
Year	Player	Date of birth	Height	Men's team	Pos	Olympic titles	Age of first/last

=== Olympic and world champions (players) ===
The following tables are pre-sorted by number of Olympic titles (in descending order), number of world titles (in descending order), year of receiving the last gold medal (in ascending order), year of receiving the first gold medal (in ascending order), name of the player (in ascending order), respectively. Last updated: 11 August 2023.

As of the 2020 Summer Olympics, there are ninety-six male athletes who won gold medals in water polo at the Summer Olympics and the World Aquatics Championships.

Legend

- Year^{*} – As host team

Male water polo players who won three Olympic titles and one or more world titles
#	Player	Birth	Height	Pos	Summer Olympics			World Aquatics Championships			Total titles	ISHOF member
#	Player	Birth	Height	Pos	Age	Men's team	Title	Age	Men's team	Title	Total titles	ISHOF member
1	Tibor Benedek	1972	1.90 m (6 ft 3 in)	FP	28–32–36	Hungary	2000–2004–2008	31	Hungary	2003	4	2016
1	Péter Biros	1976	1.94 m (6 ft 4 in)	FP	24–28–32	Hungary	2000–2004–2008	27	Hungary	2003	4	2016
1	Tamás Kásás	1976	2.00 m (6 ft 7 in)	FP	24–28–32	Hungary	2000–2004–2008	27	Hungary	2003	4	2016
1	Gergely Kiss	1977	1.99 m (6 ft 6 in)	FP	23–26–30	Hungary	2000–2004–2008	25	Hungary	2003	4	2016
1	Tamás Molnár	1975	1.93 m (6 ft 4 in)	FP	25–29–33	Hungary	2000–2004–2008	27	Hungary	2003	4	2016
1	Zoltán Szécsi	1977	1.98 m (6 ft 6 in)	GK	22–26–30	Hungary	2000–2004–2008	25	Hungary	2003	4	2016

Male water polo players who won two Olympic titles and two or more world titles
#	Player	Birth	Height	Pos	Summer Olympics			World Aquatics Championships			Total titles	ISHOF member
#	Player	Birth	Height	Pos	Age	Men's team	Title	Age	Men's team	Title	Total titles	ISHOF member
7	Aleksandr Kabanov	1948	1.81 m (5 ft 11 in)	FP	24, 32	Soviet Union	1972, 1980^{*}	27, 34	Soviet Union	1975, 1982	4	2001
8	Perica Bukić	1966	1.98 m (6 ft 6 in)	FP	18–22	Yugoslavia	1984–1988	20–24	Yugoslavia	1986–1991	4	2008
8	Igor Milanović	1965	1.95 m (6 ft 5 in)	FP	18–22	Yugoslavia	1984–1988	20–25	Yugoslavia	1986–1991	4	2006
10	Norbert Madaras	1979	1.91 m (6 ft 3 in)	FP	24–28	Hungary	2004–2008	23, 33	Hungary	2003, 2013	4	
11	Milan Aleksić	1986	1.93 m (6 ft 4 in)	FP	30–35	Serbia	2016–2020	23, 29	Serbia	2009, 2015	4	
11	Filip Filipović	1987	1.96 m (6 ft 5 in)	FP	29–34	Serbia	2016–2020	22, 28	Serbia	2009, 2015	4	
11	Stefan Mitrović	1988	1.95 m (6 ft 5 in)	FP	28–33	Serbia	2016–2020	21, 27	Serbia	2009, 2015	4	
11	Duško Pijetlović	1985	1.97 m (6 ft 6 in)	FP	31–36	Serbia	2016–2020	24, 30	Serbia	2009, 2015	4	
11	Gojko Pijetlović	1983	1.94 m (6 ft 4 in)	GK	33–38	Serbia	2016–2020	25, 32	Serbia	2009, 2015	4	
11	Andrija Prlainović	1987	1.87 m (6 ft 2 in)	FP	29–34	Serbia	2016–2020	22, 28	Serbia	2009, 2015	4	
#	Player	Birth	Height	Pos	Age	Men's team	Title	Age	Men's team	Title	Total titles	ISHOF member
#	Player	Birth	Height	Pos	Summer Olympics			World Aquatics Championships			Total titles	ISHOF member

Male water polo players who won two Olympic titles and a world title
#	Player	Birth	Height	Pos	Summer Olympics			World Aquatics Championships			Total titles	ISHOF member
#	Player	Birth	Height	Pos	Age	Men's team	Title	Age	Men's team	Title	Total titles	ISHOF member
17	Aleksei Barkalov	1946	1.80 m (5 ft 11 in)	FP	26, 34	Soviet Union	1972, 1980^{*}	29	Soviet Union	1975	3	1993
18	Dragan Andrić	1962	1.92 m (6 ft 4 in)	FP	22–26	Yugoslavia	1984–1988	24	Yugoslavia	1986	3	
18	Veselin Đuho	1960	1.87 m (6 ft 2 in)	FP	24–28	Yugoslavia	1984–1988	26	Yugoslavia	1986	3	
18	Deni Lušić	1962	1.90 m (6 ft 3 in)	FP	22–26	Yugoslavia	1984–1988	24	Yugoslavia	1986	3	
18	Tomislav Paškvalin	1961	2.04 m (6 ft 8 in)	FP	22–27	Yugoslavia	1984–1988	24	Yugoslavia	1986	3	
22	Rajmund Fodor	1976	1.90 m (6 ft 3 in)	FP	24–28	Hungary	2000–2004	27	Hungary	2003	3	
22	Barnabás Steinmetz	1975	1.96 m (6 ft 5 in)	FP	24–28	Hungary	2000–2004	27	Hungary	2003	3	
22	Attila Vári	1976	2.00 m (6 ft 7 in)	FP	24–28	Hungary	2000–2004	27	Hungary	2003	3	
25	István Gergely	1976	2.01 m (6 ft 7 in)	GK	28–32	Hungary	2004–2008	26	Hungary	2003	3	
25	Tamás Varga	1975	2.01 m (6 ft 7 in)	FP	29–33	Hungary	2004–2008	28	Hungary	2003	3	
27	Nikola Jakšić	1997	1.97 m (6 ft 6 in)	FP	19–24	Serbia	2016–2020	18	Serbia	2015	3	
27	Dušan Mandić	1994	2.02 m (6 ft 8 in)	FP	22–27	Serbia	2016–2020	21	Serbia	2015	3	
27	Branislav Mitrović	1985	2.01 m (6 ft 7 in)	GK	31–36	Serbia	2016–2020	30	Serbia	2015	3	
27	Sava Ranđelović	1993	1.93 m (6 ft 4 in)	FP	23–28	Serbia	2016–2020	22	Serbia	2015	3	
#	Player	Birth	Height	Pos	Age	Men's team	Title	Age	Men's team	Title	Total titles	ISHOF member
#	Player	Birth	Height	Pos	Summer Olympics			World Aquatics Championships			Total titles	ISHOF member

Male water polo players who won an Olympic title and two or more world titles
#	Player	Birth	Height	Pos	Summer Olympics			World Aquatics Championships			Total titles	ISHOF member
#	Player	Birth	Height	Pos	Age	Men's team	Title	Age	Men's team	Title	Total titles	ISHOF member
31	Slobodan Nikić	1983	1.97 m (6 ft 6 in)	FP	33	Serbia	2016	22	Serbia and Montenegro	2005	4	
31	Slobodan Nikić	1983	1.97 m (6 ft 6 in)	FP	33	Serbia	2016	26, 32	Serbia	2009, 2015	4	
32	Dubravko Šimenc	1966	2.01 m (6 ft 7 in)	FP	21	Yugoslavia	1988	19–24	Yugoslavia	1986–1991	3	
32	Mirko Vičević	1968	1.92 m (6 ft 4 in)	FP	20	Yugoslavia	1988	18–22	Yugoslavia	1986–1991	3	2022
34	Daniel Ballart	1973	1.78 m (5 ft 10 in)	FP	23	Spain	1996	24–28	Spain	1998–2001	3	
34	Salvador Gómez	1968	1.94 m (6 ft 4 in)	FP	28	Spain	1996	29–33	Spain	1998–2001	3	
34	Iván Moro	1974	1.86 m (6 ft 1 in)	FP	21	Spain	1996	23–26	Spain	1998–2001	3	
34	Sergi Pedrerol	1969	1.90 m (6 ft 3 in)	FP	26	Spain	1996	28–31	Spain	1998–2001	3	
34	Jesús Rollán	1968	1.87 m (6 ft 2 in)	GK	28	Spain	1996	29–33	Spain	1998–2001	3	2012
34	Carles Sanz	1975	1.77 m (5 ft 10 in)	FP	21	Spain	1996	22–26	Spain	1998–2001	3	
40	Živko Gocić	1982	1.93 m (6 ft 4 in)	FP	33	Serbia	2016	26, 32	Serbia	2009, 2015	3	
41	Andro Bušlje	1986	2.00 m (6 ft 7 in)	FP	26	Croatia	2012	21, 31	Croatia	2007, 2017	3	
41	Maro Joković	1987	2.03 m (6 ft 8 in)	FP	24	Croatia	2012	19, 29	Croatia	2007, 2017	3	
43	Dénes Varga	1987	1.93 m (6 ft 4 in)	FP	21	Hungary	2008	26, 36	Hungary	2013, 2023	3	
#	Player	Birth	Height	Pos	Age	Men's team	Title	Age	Men's team	Title	Total titles	ISHOF member
#	Player	Birth	Height	Pos	Summer Olympics			World Aquatics Championships			Total titles	ISHOF member

Male water polo players who won an Olympic title and a world title (part 1/3)
#	Player	Birth	Height	Pos	Summer Olympics			World Aquatics Championships			Total titles	ISHOF member
#	Player	Birth	Height	Pos	Age	Men's team	Title	Age	Men's team	Title	Total titles	ISHOF member
44	András Bodnár	1942	1.80 m (5 ft 11 in)	FP	22	Hungary	1964	31	Hungary	1973	2	2017
45	Aleksandr Dolgushin	1946	1.87 m (6 ft 2 in)	FP	26	Soviet Union	1972	29	Soviet Union	1975	2	2010
45	Aleksandr Dreval	1944	1.90 m (6 ft 3 in)	FP	28	Soviet Union	1972	31	Soviet Union	1975	2	
45	Nikolay Melnikov	1948	1.84 m (6 ft 0 in)	FP	24	Soviet Union	1972	27	Soviet Union	1975	2	
48	Gábor Csapó	1950	1.98 m (6 ft 6 in)	FP	25	Hungary	1976	22	Hungary	1973	2	
48	Tibor Cservenyák	1948	1.85 m (6 ft 1 in)	FP	27	Hungary	1976	25	Hungary	1973	2	
48	Tamás Faragó	1952	1.94 m (6 ft 4 in)	FP	23	Hungary	1976	21	Hungary	1973	2	1993
48	Ferenc Konrád	1945	1.83 m (6 ft 0 in)	FP	31	Hungary	1976	28	Hungary	1973	2	
48	Endre Molnár	1945	1.85 m (6 ft 1 in)	GK	31	Hungary	1976	28	Hungary	1973	2	
48	László Sárosi	1946	1.83 m (6 ft 0 in)	FP	29	Hungary	1976	26	Hungary	1973	2	
48	István Szívós Jr.	1948	2.02 m (6 ft 8 in)	FP	28	Hungary	1976	25	Hungary	1973	2	1996
55	Vladimir Ivanovich Akimov	1953	1.84 m (6 ft 0 in)	FP	27	Soviet Union	1980^{*}	29	Soviet Union	1982	2	
55	Mikhail Ivanov	1958	1.88 m (6 ft 2 in)	FP	22	Soviet Union	1980^{*}	24	Soviet Union	1982	2	
55	Sergey Kotenko	1956	1.76 m (5 ft 9 in)	FP	23	Soviet Union	1980^{*}	25	Soviet Union	1982	2	
55	Giorgi Mshvenieradze	1960	1.88 m (6 ft 2 in)	FP	19	Soviet Union	1980^{*}	21	Soviet Union	1982	2	
55	Erkin Shagaev	1959	1.78 m (5 ft 10 in)	FP	21	Soviet Union	1980^{*}	23	Soviet Union	1982	2	
55	Yevgeny Sharonov	1958	1.89 m (6 ft 2 in)	GK	21	Soviet Union	1980^{*}	23	Soviet Union	1982	2	2003
#	Player	Birth	Height	Pos	Age	Men's team	Title	Age	Men's team	Title	Total titles	ISHOF member
#	Player	Birth	Height	Pos	Summer Olympics			World Aquatics Championships			Total titles	ISHOF member

Male water polo players who won an Olympic title and a world title (part 2/3)
#	Player	Birth	Height	Pos	Summer Olympics			World Aquatics Championships			Total titles	ISHOF member
#	Player	Birth	Height	Pos	Age	Men's team	Title	Age	Men's team	Title	Total titles	ISHOF member
61	Milorad Krivokapić	1956	1.87 m (6 ft 2 in)	GK	28	Yugoslavia	1984	30	Yugoslavia	1986	2	
61	Zoran Petrović	1960	2.03 m (6 ft 8 in)	FP	23	Yugoslavia	1984	26	Yugoslavia	1986	2	
61	Andrija Popović	1959	1.93 m (6 ft 4 in)	GK	24	Yugoslavia	1984	26	Yugoslavia	1986	2	
61	Goran Sukno	1959	1.88 m (6 ft 2 in)	FP	25	Yugoslavia	1984	27	Yugoslavia	1986	2	
65	Mislav Bezmalinović	1967	1.97 m (6 ft 6 in)	FP	21	Yugoslavia	1988	23	Yugoslavia	1991	2	
65	Renco Posinković	1964	1.97 m (6 ft 6 in)	GK	24	Yugoslavia	1988	27	Yugoslavia	1991	2	
65	Goran Rađenović	1966	1.97 m (6 ft 6 in)	FP	21	Yugoslavia	1988	24	Yugoslavia	1991	2	
65	Aleksandar Šoštar	1964	1.96 m (6 ft 5 in)	GK	24	Yugoslavia	1988	26	Yugoslavia	1991	2	2011
69	Francesco Attolico	1963	1.93 m (6 ft 4 in)	FP	29	Italy	1992	31	Italy	1994^{*}	2	
69	Gianni Averaimo	1964	1.83 m (6 ft 0 in)	GK	27	Italy	1992	30	Italy	1994^{*}	2	
69	Alessandro Bovo	1969	1.85 m (6 ft 1 in)	FP	23	Italy	1992	25	Italy	1994^{*}	2	
69	Sandro Campagna	1963	1.82 m (6 ft 0 in)	FP	29	Italy	1992	31	Italy	1994^{*}	2	2019
69	Marco D'Altrui	1964	1.80 m (5 ft 11 in)	FP	28	Italy	1992	30	Italy	1994^{*}	2	2010
69	Massimiliano Ferretti	1966	1.94 m (6 ft 4 in)	FP	26	Italy	1992	28	Italy	1994^{*}	2	
69	Mario Fiorillo	1962	1.79 m (5 ft 10 in)	FP	29	Italy	1992	31	Italy	1994^{*}	2	
69	Ferdinando Gandolfi	1967		FP	25	Italy	1992	27	Italy	1994^{*}	2	
69	Amedeo Pomilio	1967	1.78 m (5 ft 10 in)	FP	25	Italy	1992	27	Italy	1994^{*}	2	
69	Francesco Porzio	1966	1.85 m (6 ft 1 in)	FP	26	Italy	1992	28	Italy	1994^{*}	2	
69	Pino Porzio	1967		FP	25	Italy	1992	27	Italy	1994^{*}	2	
69	Carlo Silipo	1971	1.99 m (6 ft 6 in)	FP	20	Italy	1992	23	Italy	1994^{*}	2	
#	Player	Birth	Height	Pos	Age	Men's team	Title	Age	Men's team	Title	Total titles	ISHOF member
#	Player	Birth	Height	Pos	Summer Olympics			World Aquatics Championships			Total titles	ISHOF member

Male water polo players who won an Olympic title and a world title (part 3/3)
#	Player	Birth	Height	Pos	Summer Olympics			World Aquatics Championships			Total titles	ISHOF member
#	Player	Birth	Height	Pos	Age	Men's team	Title	Age	Men's team	Title	Total titles	ISHOF member
81	Manuel Estiarte	1961	1.78 m (5 ft 10 in)	FP	34	Spain	1996	36	Spain	1998	2	2007
81	Pedro García	1968	1.93 m (6 ft 4 in)	FP	27	Spain	1996	29	Spain	1998	2	
81	Jordi Sans	1965	1.80 m (5 ft 11 in)	FP	30	Spain	1996	32	Spain	1998	2	
84	Ángel Andreo	1972	1.91 m (6 ft 3 in)	GK	23	Spain	1996	28	Spain	2001	2	
85	Zsolt Varga	1972	1.93 m (6 ft 4 in)	FP	28	Hungary	2000	31	Hungary	2003	2	
86	Samir Barać	1973	1.87 m (6 ft 2 in)	FP	38	Croatia	2012	33	Croatia	2007	2	
86	Miho Bošković	1983	1.96 m (6 ft 5 in)	FP	29	Croatia	2012	24	Croatia	2007	2	
86	Damir Burić	1980	2.05 m (6 ft 9 in)	FP	31	Croatia	2012	26	Croatia	2007	2	
86	Igor Hinić	1975	2.02 m (6 ft 8 in)	FP	36	Croatia	2012	31	Croatia	2007	2	
86	Josip Pavić	1982	1.95 m (6 ft 5 in)	GK	30	Croatia	2012	25	Croatia	2007	2	
86	Frano Vićan	1976	1.92 m (6 ft 4 in)	GK	36	Croatia	2012	31	Croatia	2007	2	
92	Norbert Hosnyánszky	1984	1.96 m (6 ft 5 in)	FP	24	Hungary	2008	29	Hungary	2013	2	
92	Dániel Varga	1983	2.01 m (6 ft 7 in)	FP	24	Hungary	2008	29	Hungary	2013	2	
94	Miloš Ćuk	1990	1.91 m (6 ft 3 in)	FP	25	Serbia	2016	24	Serbia	2015	2	
95	Ivan Buljubašić	1987	1.98 m (6 ft 6 in)	FP	24	Croatia	2012	29	Croatia	2017	2	
95	Sandro Sukno	1990	2.00 m (6 ft 7 in)	FP	22	Croatia	2012	27	Croatia	2017	2	
#	Player	Birth	Height	Pos	Age	Men's team	Title	Age	Men's team	Title	Total titles	ISHOF member
#	Player	Birth	Height	Pos	Summer Olympics			World Aquatics Championships			Total titles	ISHOF member

=== Olympic champion families ===
The following tables are pre-sorted by year of receiving the Olympic gold medal (in ascending order), name of the player (in ascending order), respectively. Last updated: 12 September 2021.

Legend

- Year^{*} – As host team

Two brothers participating in the Olympics
Family	Player	Date of birth	Height	Men's team	Pos	Olympic title	Age	Note	Ref
Rademacher	Erich Rademacher	9 June 1901		Germany	GK	1928	27	Two brothers in an Olympic tournament	
Rademacher	Joachim Rademacher	20 June 1906		Germany	FP	1928	22	Two brothers in an Olympic tournament	
Keserű	Alajos Keserű	8 March 1905		Hungary	FP	1932	27	Two brothers in an Olympic tournament	
Keserű	Ferenc Keserű	27 August 1903		Hungary	FP	1932	28	Two brothers in an Olympic tournament	
Pandolfini	Gianfranco Pandolfini	16 September 1920		Italy	FP	1948	27	Two brothers in an Olympic tournament	
Pandolfini	Tullio Pandolfini	6 August 1914		Italy		1948	34	Two brothers in an Olympic tournament	
Konrád	János Konrád	27 August 1941	1.83 m (6 ft 0 in)	Hungary	FP	1964	23		
Konrád	Ferenc Konrád	17 April 1945	1.83 m (6 ft 0 in)	Hungary	FP	1976	31		
Akimov	Anatoly Akimov	15 November 1947	1.81 m (5 ft 11 in)	Soviet Union	FP	1972	24		
Akimov	Vladimir Akimov	20 July 1953	1.84 m (6 ft 0 in)	Soviet Union	FP	1980^{*}	27		
Porzio	Francesco Porzio	26 January 1966	1.85 m (6 ft 1 in)	Italy	FP	1992	26	Two brothers in an Olympic tournament	
Porzio	Pino Porzio	26 February 1967		Italy	FP	1992	25	Two brothers in an Olympic tournament	
Steinmetz	Barnabás Steinmetz	6 October 1975	1.96 m (6 ft 5 in)	Hungary	CB	2000	24		
Steinmetz	Barnabás Steinmetz	6 October 1975	1.96 m (6 ft 5 in)	Hungary	CB	2004	28	Two brothers in an Olympic tournament	
Steinmetz	Ádám Steinmetz	11 August 1980	1.97 m (6 ft 6 in)	Hungary	FP	2004	24	Two brothers in an Olympic tournament	
Varga	Dániel Varga	25 September 1983	2.00 m (6 ft 7 in)	Hungary	FP	2008	24	Two brothers in an Olympic tournament	
Varga	Dénes Varga	29 March 1987	1.93 m (6 ft 4 in)	Hungary	FP	2008	21	Two brothers in an Olympic tournament	
Pijetlović	Duško Pijetlović	25 April 1985	1.97 m (6 ft 6 in)	Serbia	FP	2016–2020	31–36	Two brothers in an Olympic tournament	
Pijetlović	Gojko Pijetlović	7 August 1983	1.94 m (6 ft 4 in)	Serbia	GK	2016–2020	33–38	Two brothers in an Olympic tournament	
Family	Player	Date of birth	Height	Men's team	Pos	Olympic title	Age	Note	Ref

Father and son participating in the Olympics
Family	Player	Date of birth	Height	Men's team	Pos	Olympic title	Age	Ref
Szívós	István Szívós Sr.	20 August 1920	1.85 m (6 ft 1 in)	Hungary	FP	1952–1956	31–36	
Szívós	István Szívós Jr.	24 April 1948	2.02 m (6 ft 8 in)	Hungary	FP	1976	28	
D'Altrui	Giuseppe D'Altrui	7 April 1934	1.85 m (6 ft 1 in)	Italy	FP	1960^{*}	26	
D'Altrui	Marco D'Altrui	25 April 1964	1.80 m (5 ft 11 in)	Italy	FP	1992	28	
Sukno	Goran Sukno	6 April 1959	1.88 m (6 ft 2 in)	Yugoslavia	FP	1984	25	
Sukno	Sandro Sukno	30 June 1990	2.00 m (6 ft 7 in)	Croatia	FP	2012	22	

== Coach statistics ==
=== Most successful coaches ===
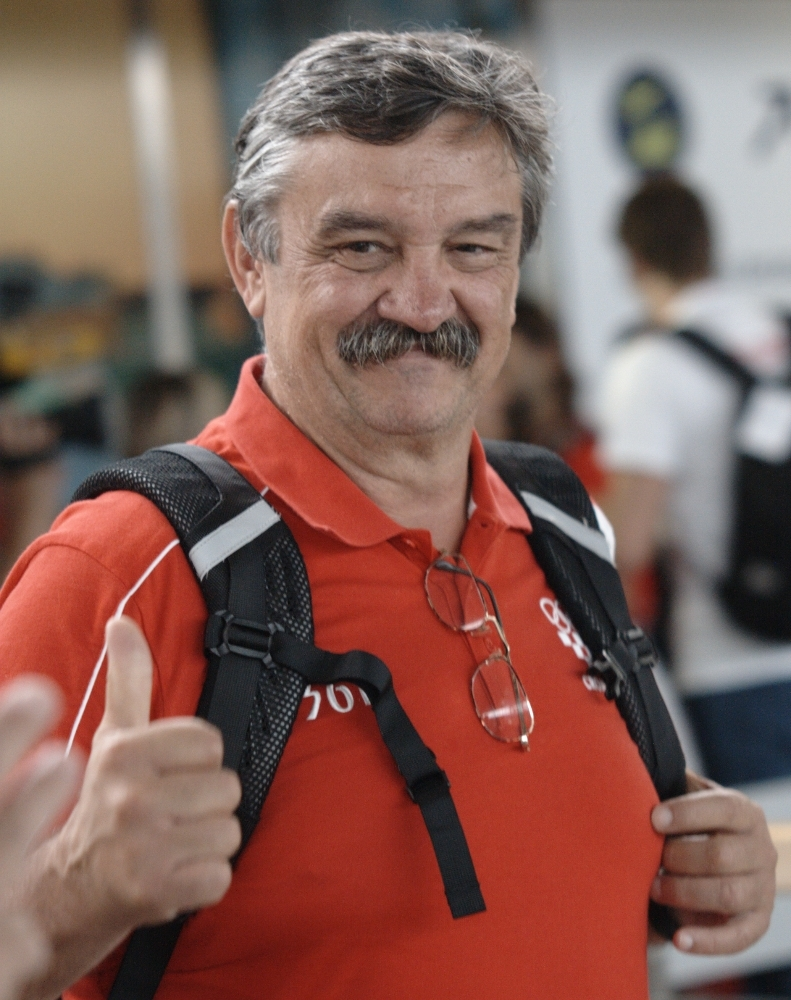
Ratko Rudić coached three men's national teams to four Olympic gold medals.

The following table is pre-sorted by number of Olympic gold medals (in descending order), year of winning the last Olympic gold medal (in ascending order), name of the coach (in ascending order), respectively. Last updated: 12 September 2021.

There are four coaches who led men's national water polo teams to win two or more Olympic gold medals.

Ratko Rudić is the most successful water polo coach in Olympic history. As a head coach, he led three men's national water polo teams to win four Olympic gold medals. He guided Yugoslavia men's national team to two consecutive gold medals in 1984 and 1988, Italy men's national team to a gold medal in 1992, and Croatia men's national team to a gold medal in 2012, making him the first and only coach to lead three different men's national water polo teams to the Olympic titles.

Dénes Kemény of Hungary is another coach who led men's national water polo team(s) to win three Olympic gold medals. Under his leadership, the Hungary men's national team won three gold in a row between 2000 and 2008, becoming the second water polo team to have an Olympic winning streak.

Béla Rajki coached the Hungary men's national team to two consecutive Olympic gold medals in 1952 and 1956.

Dejan Savić led Serbia men's national team to win two consecutive Olympic gold medals in 2016 and 2021.

Legend

- Year^{*} – As host team

Head coaches who led men's national teams to win two or more Olympic gold medals
Rk	Head coach	Nationality	Birth	Age	Men's team	Olympic titles	Total	Ref
1	Ratko Rudić	Yugoslavia	1948	36–40	Yugoslavia	1984–1988	4	
1	Ratko Rudić	Croatia	1948	44	Italy	1992	4	
1	Ratko Rudić	Croatia	1948	64	Croatia	2012	4	
2	Dénes Kemény	Hungary	1954	46–54	Hungary	2000–2004–2008	3	
3	Béla Rajki	Hungary	1909	43–47	Hungary	1952–1956	2	
3	Dejan Savić	Serbia	1975	41–46	Serbia	2016–2020	2	

=== Champions as coach and player ===
The following table is pre-sorted by number of Olympic gold medals (in descending order), year of winning the last Olympic gold medal (in ascending order), name of the person (in ascending order), respectively. Last updated: 12 September 2021.

Only one water polo player won an Olympic gold medal and then guided a men's national water polo team to the Olympic title as a head coach.

Dezső Gyarmati of Hungary won three Olympic gold medals in 1952–1956 and 1964. He coached the Hungary men's national team to a gold in 1976.

Legend

- Year^{*} – As host team

Rk	Person	Birth	Height	Player				Head coach			Total titles	Ref
Rk	Person	Birth	Height	Age	Men's team	Pos	Olympic title	Age	Men's team	Olympic title	Total titles	Ref
1	Dezső Gyarmati	1927	1.86 m (6 ft 1 in)	24–27, 36	Hungary	FP	1952–1956, 1964	48	Hungary	1976	4	

=== Olympic and world champions (coaches) ===
The following table is pre-sorted by number of Olympic titles (in descending order), number of world titles (in descending order), year of winning the last gold medal (in ascending order), year of winning the first gold medal (in ascending order), name of the coach (in ascending order), respectively. Last updated: 12 September 2021.

As of the 2020 Summer Olympics, there are six head coaches who led men's national teams to win gold medals in water polo at the Summer Olympics and the World Aquatics Championships.

Legend

- Year^{*} – As host team

Head coaches who led men's national teams to win gold medals in water polo at the Summer Olympics and the World Aquatics Championships
#	Coach	Nationality	Birth	Summer Olympics			World Aquatics Championships			Total titles	ISHOF member	Ref
#	Coach	Nationality	Birth	Age	Men's team	Title	Age	Men's team	Title	Total titles	ISHOF member	Ref
1	Ratko Rudić	Yugoslavia	1948	36–40	Yugoslavia	1984–1988	38	Yugoslavia	1986	7	2007	
1	Ratko Rudić	Croatia	1948	44	Italy	1992	46	Italy	1994^{*}	7	2007	
1	Ratko Rudić	Croatia	1948	64	Croatia	2012	58	Croatia	2007	7	2007	
2	Dénes Kemény	Hungary	1954	46–54	Hungary	2000–2004–2008	49	Hungary	2003	4	2011	
3	Dejan Savić	Serbia	1975	41–46	Serbia	2016–2020	40	Serbia	2015	3		
4	Juan Jané	Spain	1953	43	Spain	1996	44–48	Spain	1998–2001	3		
5	Dezső Gyarmati	Hungary	1927	48	Hungary	1976	45	Hungary	1973	2	1976	
5	Boris Popov	Soviet Union	1941	39	Soviet Union	1980^{*}	41	Soviet Union	1982	2	2019	

== Champions by tournament ==
=== 2020 (Serbia, 2nd title) ===
* Edition of men's tournament: 28th

- Host city: Tokyo, Japan
- Number of participating teams: 12
- Competition format: Round-robin pools advanced teams to classification matches
- Champion: Serbia (2nd title; 3rd place in preliminary B group)

Results
Match	Round	Date	Cap color	Opponent	Result	Goals for	Goals against	Goal diff.
Match 1/8	Preliminary round – Group B	25 July 2021	White	Spain	Lost	12	13	–1
Match 2/8	Preliminary round – Group B	27 July 2021	Blue	Kazakhstan	Won	19	5	14
Match 3/8	Preliminary round – Group B	29 July 2021	White	Australia	Won	14	8	6
Match 4/8	Preliminary round – Group B	31 July 2021	Blue	Croatia	Lost	12	14	–2
Match 5/8	Preliminary round – Group B	2 August 2021	White	Montenegro	Won	13	6	7
Match 6/8	Quarter-finals	4 August 2021	Blue	Italy	Won	10	6	4
Match 7/8	Semi-finals	6 August 2021	White	Spain	Won	10	9	1
Match 8/8	Gold medal match (gold)	8 August 2021	Blue	Greece	Won	13	10	3
Total	Matches played: 8 • Wins: 6 • Ties: 0 • Defeats: 2 • Win %: 75.0%					103	71	32

Source: Official Results Books (PDF): 2020 (pp. 22, 28, 48, 54, 68, 76, 88, 96).

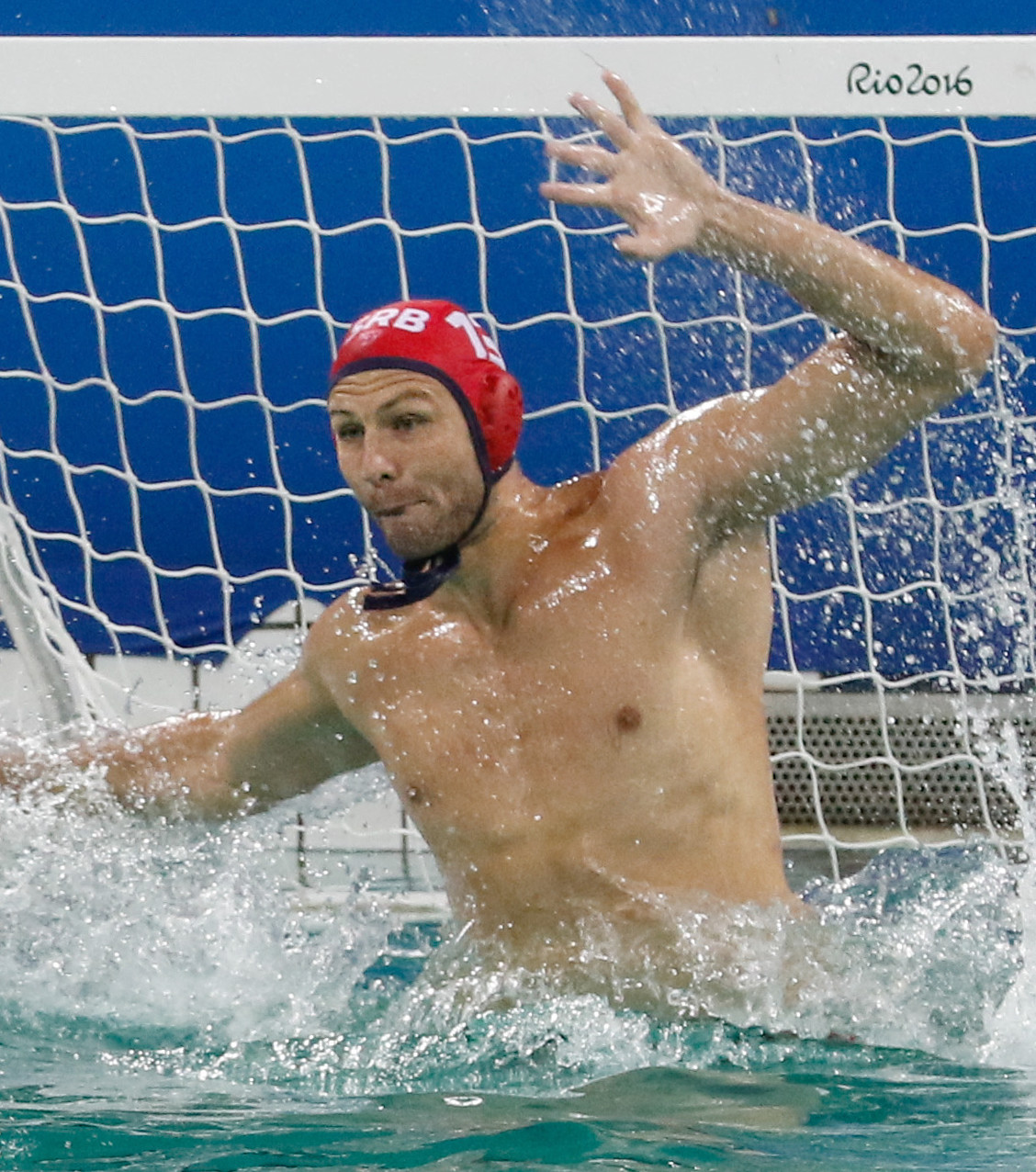
Branislav Mitrović saved 70 shots at the 2020 Olympics, helping Serbia win gold.

- Head coach: (Serbia) Dejan Savić (2nd title as head coach)
- Assistant coaches: (Serbia) Stefan Ćirić, (Serbia) Vladimir Vujasinović

Roster
Cap No.	Player	Pos	L/R	Height	Weight	Date of birth	Age of winning gold	Oly debut	ISHOF member
1	Gojko Pijetlović	GK	R	1.94 m (6 ft 4 in)	92 kg (203 lb)	7 August 1983	38 years, 1 day	No	
2	Dušan Mandić	FP	L	2.02 m (6 ft 8 in)	105 kg (231 lb)	16 June 1994	27 years, 53 days	No	
3	Nikola Dedović	FP	R	1.89 m (6 ft 2 in)	92 kg (203 lb)	25 January 1992	29 years, 195 days	Yes	
4	Sava Ranđelović	FP	R	1.93 m (6 ft 4 in)	98 kg (216 lb)	17 July 1993	28 years, 22 days	No	
5	Đorđe Lazić	FP	R	1.94 m (6 ft 4 in)	95 kg (209 lb)	19 May 1996	25 years, 81 days	Yes	
6	Duško Pijetlović	FP	R	1.97 m (6 ft 6 in)	97 kg (214 lb)	25 April 1985	36 years, 105 days	No	
7	Strahinja Rašović	FP	R	1.88 m (6 ft 2 in)	85 kg (187 lb)	9 March 1992	29 years, 152 days	Yes	
8	Milan Aleksić	FP	R	1.93 m (6 ft 4 in)	96 kg (212 lb)	13 May 1986	35 years, 87 days	No	
9	Nikola Jakšić	FP	R	1.97 m (6 ft 6 in)	91 kg (201 lb)	17 January 1997	24 years, 203 days	No	
10	Filip Filipović (C)	FP	L	1.96 m (6 ft 5 in)	101 kg (223 lb)	2 May 1987	34 years, 98 days	No	
11	Andrija Prlainović	FP	R	1.87 m (6 ft 2 in)	93 kg (205 lb)	28 April 1987	34 years, 102 days	No	
12	Stefan Mitrović	FP	R	1.95 m (6 ft 5 in)	91 kg (201 lb)	29 March 1988	33 years, 132 days	No	
13	Branislav Mitrović	GK	R	2.01 m (6 ft 7 in)	100 kg (220 lb)	30 January 1985	36 years, 190 days	No	
Average				1.94 m (6 ft 4 in)	95 kg (209 lb)	1 December 1989	31 years, 250 days		
Coach	Dejan Savić			1.90 m (6 ft 3 in)		24 April 1975	46 years, 106 days		

Note: Duško Pijetlović and Gojko Pijetlović are brothers.
Sources:

- Official Results Books (PDF): 2020 (p. 151);
- ISHOF.

Abbreviation

- MP – Matches played
- Min – Minutes
- Avg min – Average minutes
- G – Goals
- Sh – Shots
- TF – Turnover fouls
- ST – Steals
- RB – Rebounds
- BL – Blocked shots
- SP – Sprints

Statistics (part 1)
Cap No.	Player	Pos	MP	Minutes played			Goals/Shots			TF	ST	RB	BL	Sprints		
Cap No.	Player	Pos	MP	Min	Avg min	%	G	Sh	%	TF	ST	RB	BL	Won	SP	%
1	Gojko Pijetlović	GK	2	64	32.0	3.6%					2					
2	Dušan Mandić	FP	8	162	20.3	9.0%	17	36	47.2%	2	7	7	4			
3	Nikola Dedović	FP	8	168	21.0	9.4%	5	16	31.3%	3	3	4	2	2	10	20.0%
4	Sava Ranđelović	FP	8	66	8.3	3.7%	3	7	42.9%	2	1	1	1			
5	Đorđe Lazić	FP	8	120	15.0	6.7%	4	12	33.3%	7	5	2	6			
6	Duško Pijetlović	FP	8	119	14.9	6.6%	12	24	50.0%	10	1	3	3			
7	Strahinja Rašović	FP	8	195	24.4	10.9%	13	34	38.2%	3	3	6	4	8	19	42.1%
8	Milan Aleksić	FP	8	96	12.0	5.4%	2	10	20.0%	2	2	4	4			
9	Nikola Jakšić	FP	8	128	16.0	7.1%	12	20	60.0%	2	5	3	4			
10	Filip Filipović (C)	FP	8	174	21.8	9.7%	16	27	59.3%	2	6	10	10	1	2	50.0%
11	Andrija Prlainović	FP	8	175	21.9	9.8%	12	34	35.3%	3	4	6	4			
12	Stefan Mitrović	FP	8	135	16.9	7.5%	7	17	41.2%	1	4	2	3	0	1	0.0%
13	Branislav Mitrović	GK	6	192	32.0	10.7%					4					
Team										3						
Total			8	256	32.0	100%	103	237	43.5%	40	47	48	45	11	32	34.4%
Against							71	243	29.2%	40	41	44	17	21	32	65.6%

Abbreviation

- CP – Centre forward position exclusion
- FP – Field exclusion
- DS – Driving situation exclusion
- M6 – Exclusion in 6 metre free throw situation
- CS – Counter attacking situation exclusion
- DE – Double exclusion
- Pen – Penalty foul
- EX – Exclusions with substitution

Statistics (part 2)
Cap No.	Player	Pos	Personal fouls							
Cap No.	Player	Pos	CP	FP	DS	M6	CS	DE	Pen	EX
1	Gojko Pijetlović	GK								
2	Dušan Mandić	FP	5	3					1	
3	Nikola Dedović	FP	9	2		1	1		1	1
4	Sava Ranđelović	FP	16	1					1	3
5	Đorđe Lazić	FP	1			1	1			
6	Duško Pijetlović	FP	7	1		1	1			1
7	Strahinja Rašović	FP	2	1						
8	Milan Aleksić	FP	14			2	2			2
9	Nikola Jakšić	FP	13	3					1	1
10	Filip Filipović (C)	FP	4	1						
11	Andrija Prlainović	FP	4	5					2	1
12	Stefan Mitrović	FP	3	2		2	2			2
13	Branislav Mitrović	GK								
Total			78	19		7	7		6	11
Against			71	10	2	5	5		11	10

Statistics (part 3)
Cap No.	Player	Pos	Saves/Shots		
Cap No.	Player	Pos	Saves	Shots	%
1	Gojko Pijetlović	GK	19	38	50.0%
13	Branislav Mitrović	GK	70	122	57.4%
Total			89	160	55.6%

Source: Official Results Books (PDF): 2020 (p. 150).

=== 2016 (Serbia, 1st title) ===
* Edition of men's tournament: 27th

- Host city: Rio de Janeiro, Brazil
- Number of participating teams: 12
- Competition format: Round-robin pools advanced teams to classification matches
- Champion: Serbia (1st title; 4th place in preliminary A group)

Results
Match	Round	Date	Cap color	Opponent	Result	Goals for	Goals against	Goal diff.
Match 1/8	Preliminary round – Group A	6 August 2016	White	Hungary	Drawn	13	13	0
Match 2/8	Preliminary round – Group A	8 August 2016	White	Greece	Drawn	9	9	0
Match 3/8	Preliminary round – Group A	10 August 2016	Blue	Brazil	Lost	5	6	–1
Match 4/8	Preliminary round – Group A	12 August 2016	White	Australia	Won	10	8	2
Match 5/8	Preliminary round – Group A	14 August 2016	White	Japan	Won	12	8	4
Match 6/8	Quarter-finals	16 August 2016	White	Spain	Won	10	7	3
Match 7/8	Semi-finals	18 August 2016	Blue	Italy	Won	10	8	2
Match 8/8	Gold medal match (gold)	20 August 2016	Blue	Croatia	Won	11	7	4
Total	Matches played: 8 • Wins: 5 • Ties: 2 • Defeats: 1 • Win %: 62.5%					80	66	14

Source: Official Results Books (PDF): 2016 (pp. 9, 21, 37, 53, 65, 75, 83, 91).

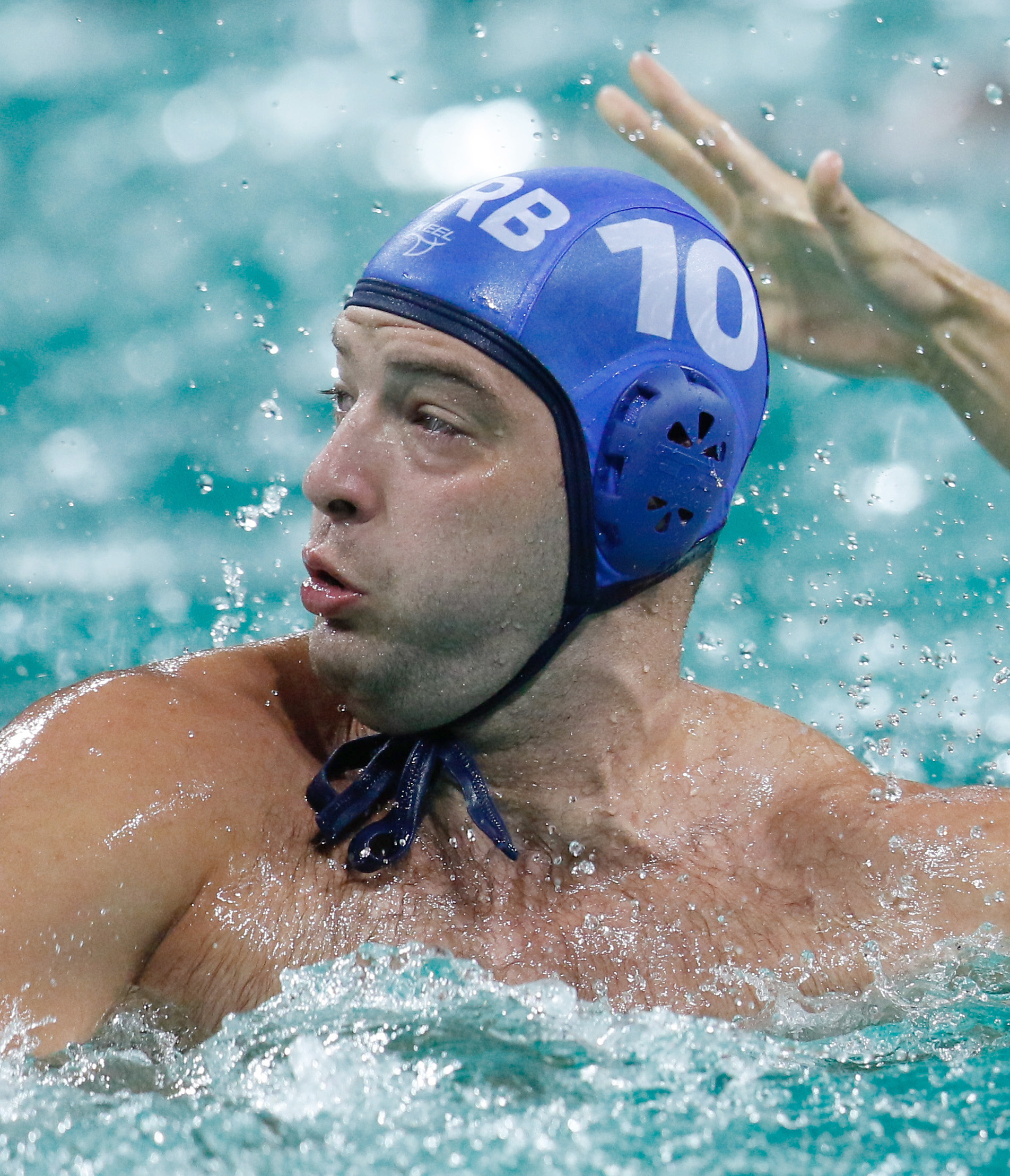
Filip Filipović scored 19 goals at the 2016 Olympics, helping Serbia win gold. He was named the Most Valuable Player of the men's water polo tournament.

- Head coach: (Serbia) Dejan Savić (1st title as head coach)
- Assistant coaches: (Serbia) Stefan Ćirić, (Serbia) Vladimir Vujasinović

Roster
Cap No.	Player	Pos	L/R	Height	Weight	Date of birth	Age of winning gold	Oly debut	ISHOF member
1	Gojko Pijetlović	GK	R	1.94 m (6 ft 4 in)	92 kg (203 lb)	7 August 1983	33 years, 13 days	No	
2	Dušan Mandić	FP	L	2.02 m (6 ft 8 in)	105 kg (231 lb)	16 June 1994	22 years, 65 days	No	
3	Živko Gocić (C)	FP	R	1.93 m (6 ft 4 in)	93 kg (205 lb)	22 August 1982	33 years, 364 days	No	
4	Sava Ranđelović	FP	R	1.93 m (6 ft 4 in)	98 kg (216 lb)	17 July 1993	23 years, 34 days	Yes	
5	Miloš Ćuk	FP	R	1.91 m (6 ft 3 in)	91 kg (201 lb)	21 December 1990	25 years, 243 days	Yes	
6	Duško Pijetlović	FP	R	1.97 m (6 ft 6 in)	97 kg (214 lb)	25 April 1985	31 years, 117 days	No	
7	Slobodan Nikić	FP	R	1.97 m (6 ft 6 in)	106 kg (234 lb)	25 January 1983	33 years, 208 days	No	
8	Milan Aleksić	FP	R	1.93 m (6 ft 4 in)	96 kg (212 lb)	13 May 1986	30 years, 99 days	No	
9	Nikola Jakšić	FP	R	1.97 m (6 ft 6 in)	89 kg (196 lb)	17 January 1997	19 years, 216 days	Yes	
10	Filip Filipović	FP	L	1.96 m (6 ft 5 in)	101 kg (223 lb)	2 May 1987	29 years, 110 days	No	
11	Andrija Prlainović	FP	R	1.87 m (6 ft 2 in)	93 kg (205 lb)	28 April 1987	29 years, 114 days	No	
12	Stefan Mitrović	FP	R	1.95 m (6 ft 5 in)	91 kg (201 lb)	29 March 1988	28 years, 144 days	No	
13	Branislav Mitrović	GK	R	2.01 m (6 ft 7 in)	100 kg (220 lb)	30 January 1985	31 years, 203 days	Yes	
Average				1.95 m (6 ft 5 in)	96 kg (212 lb)	28 January 1988	28 years, 205 days		
Coach	Dejan Savić			1.90 m (6 ft 3 in)		24 April 1975	41 years, 118 days		

Note: Duško Pijetlović and Gojko Pijetlović are brothers.
Sources:

- Official Results Books (PDF): 2016 (p. 132);
- ISHOF.

Abbreviation

- MP – Matches played
- Min – Minutes
- G – Goals
- Sh – Shots
- AS – Assists
- TF – Turnover fouls
- ST – Steals
- BL – Blocked shots
- SP – Sprints
- 20S – 20 seconds exclusion
- DE – Double exclusion
- Pen – Penalty
- EX – Exclusion

Statistics
Cap No.	Player	Pos	MP	Minutes played		Goals/Shots			AS	TF	ST	BL	Sprints			Personal fouls			
Cap No.	Player	Pos	MP	Min	%	G	Sh	%	AS	TF	ST	BL	Won	SP	%	20S	DE	Pen	EX
1	Gojko Pijetlović	GK	8	32	12.5%						1								
2	Dušan Mandić	FP	8	170	66.4%	12	24	50.0%	4	10	1	6				6			
3	Živko Gocić (C)	FP	8	156	60.9%	2	12	16.7%	3	3	3	3	3	8	37.5%	11			
4	Sava Ranđelović	FP	8	60	23.4%	2	4	50.0%		2	4	2				13		1	1
5	Miloš Ćuk	FP	8	122	47.7%	6	21	28.6%	1	4	3	2	5	11	45.5%	4		1	1
6	Duško Pijetlović	FP	8	129	50.4%	8	16	50.0%	1	17		2				11			1
7	Slobodan Nikić	FP	8	115	44.9%	10	20	50.0%	1	13	1	2				4			
8	Milan Aleksić	FP	8	134	52.3%	4	13	30.8%	4	6	5	3				11		1	2
9	Nikola Jakšić	FP	8	88	34.4%	4	7	57.1%		4	2	2				13		1	2
10	Filip Filipović	FP	8	178	69.5%	19	44	43.2%	7	9	6	6	0	1	0.0%	7			
11	Andrija Prlainović	FP	8	210	82.0%	5	25	20.0%	6	5	5	5				9	1	1	2
12	Stefan Mitrović	FP	8	174	68.0%	8	26	30.8%	1	10	4	7	4	12	33.3%	3			
13	Branislav Mitrović	GK	8	224	87.5%						11								
Team										3									
Total			8	256	100%	80	212	37.7%	28	86	46	40	12	32	37.5%	92	1	5	9
Against						66	216	30.6%	24	102	47	22	20	32	62.5%	82	1	4	7

Cap No.	Player	Pos	Saves/Shots		
Cap No.	Player	Pos	Saves	Shots	%
1	Gojko Pijetlović	GK	14	21	66.7%
13	Branislav Mitrović	GK	60	119	50.4%
Total			74	140	52.9%

Source: Official Results Books (PDF): 2016 (p. 131).

=== 2012 (Croatia, 1st title) ===
* Edition of men's tournament: 26th

- Host city: London, United Kingdom
- Number of participating teams: 12
- Competition format: Round-robin pools advanced teams to classification matches
- Champion: Croatia (1st title; 1st place in preliminary A group)

Results
Match	Round	Date	Cap color	Opponent	Result	Goals for	Goals against	Goal diff.
Match 1/8	Preliminary round – Group A	29 July 2012	Blue	Greece	Won	8	6	2
Match 2/8	Preliminary round – Group A	31 July 2012	White	Spain	Won	8	7	1
Match 3/8	Preliminary round – Group A	2 August 2012	Blue	Italy	Won	11	6	5
Match 4/8	Preliminary round – Group A	4 August 2012	White	Australia	Won	11	6	5
Match 5/8	Preliminary round – Group A	6 August 2012	Blue	Kazakhstan	Won	12	4	8
Match 6/8	Quarter-finals	8 August 2012	White	United States	Won	8	2	6
Match 7/8	Semi-finals	10 August 2012	White	Montenegro	Won	7	5	2
Match 8/8	Gold medal match	12 August 2012	White	Italy	Won	8	6	2
Total	Matches played: 8 • Wins: 8 • Ties: 0 • Defeats: 0 • Win %: 100%					73	42	31

Source: Official Results Books (PDF): 2012 (pp. 373, 391, 399, 415, 421, 433, 445, 455).

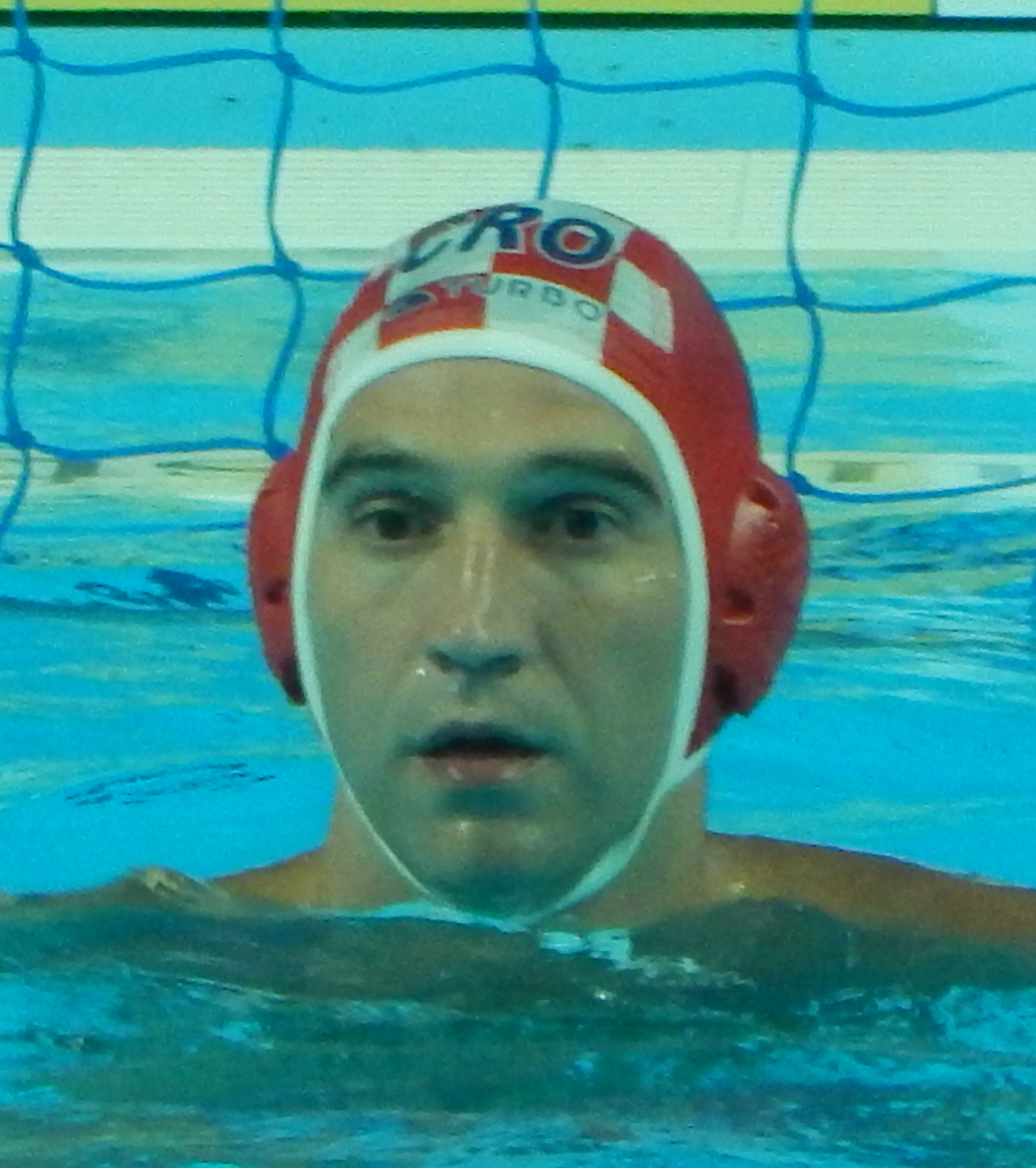
Josip Pavić saved 85 shots at the 2012 Games, helping Croatia win the Olympic title. He was named the Most Valuable Player of the men's water polo tournament.

- Head coach: (Croatia) Ratko Rudić (4th title as head coach)
- Assistant coaches: (Croatia) Elvis Fatović, (Croatia) Vjekoslav Kobešćak

Roster
Cap No.	Player	Pos	L/R	Height	Weight	Date of birth	Age of winning gold	Oly debut	ISHOF member
1	Josip Pavić	GK	R	1.95 m (6 ft 5 in)	90 kg (198 lb)	15 January 1982	30 years, 210 days	No	
2	Damir Burić	FP	R	2.05 m (6 ft 9 in)	115 kg (254 lb)	2 December 1980	31 years, 254 days	No	
3	Miho Bošković	FP	R	1.96 m (6 ft 5 in)	96 kg (212 lb)	11 January 1983	29 years, 214 days	No	
4	Nikša Dobud	FP	R	1.99 m (6 ft 6 in)	118 kg (260 lb)	5 August 1985	27 years, 7 days	Yes	
5	Maro Joković	FP	L	2.03 m (6 ft 8 in)	95 kg (209 lb)	1 October 1987	24 years, 316 days	No	
6	Ivan Buljubašić	FP	R	1.98 m (6 ft 6 in)	108 kg (238 lb)	31 October 1987	24 years, 286 days	Yes	
7	Petar Muslim	FP	R	2.00 m (6 ft 7 in)	102 kg (225 lb)	26 March 1988	24 years, 139 days	Yes	
8	Andro Bušlje	FP	R	2.00 m (6 ft 7 in)	115 kg (254 lb)	4 January 1986	26 years, 221 days	No	
9	Sandro Sukno	FP	R	2.00 m (6 ft 7 in)	93 kg (205 lb)	30 June 1990	22 years, 43 days	Yes	
10	Samir Barać (C)	FP	R	1.87 m (6 ft 2 in)	89 kg (196 lb)	2 November 1973	38 years, 284 days	No	
11	Igor Hinić	FP	R	2.02 m (6 ft 8 in)	110 kg (243 lb)	4 December 1975	36 years, 252 days	No	
12	Paulo Obradović	FP	R	1.90 m (6 ft 3 in)	100 kg (220 lb)	9 March 1986	26 years, 156 days	Yes	
13	Frano Vićan	GK	R	1.92 m (6 ft 4 in)	94 kg (207 lb)	24 January 1976	36 years, 201 days	No	
Average				1.97 m (6 ft 6 in)	102 kg (225 lb)	19 May 1983	29 years, 85 days		
Coach	Ratko Rudić			1.88 m (6 ft 2 in)		7 June 1948	64 years, 66 days		2007

Sources:

- Official Results Books (PDF): 2012 (p. 472);
- ISHOF.

Abbreviation

- MP – Matches played
- Min – Minutes
- G – Goals
- Sh – Shots
- AS – Assists
- TF – Turnover fouls
- ST – Steals
- BL – Blocked shots
- SP – Sprints
- 20S – 20 seconds exclusion
- DE – Double exclusion
- Pen – Penalty
- EX – Exclusion

Statistics
Cap No.	Player	Pos	MP	Minutes played		Goals/Shots			AS	TF	ST	BL	Sprints			Personal fouls			
Cap No.	Player	Pos	MP	Min	%	G	Sh	%	AS	TF	ST	BL	Won	SP	%	20S	DE	Pen	EX
1	Josip Pavić	GK	8	222	86.7%						4								
2	Damir Burić	FP	8	131	51.2%	5	14	35.7%	1	5	4	7				10		1	
3	Miho Bošković	FP	8	155	60.5%	15	33	45.5%	9	10	2		1	2	50.0%	7			1
4	Nikša Dobud	FP	8	149	58.2%	12	20	60.0%		29	2	5				6	1		
5	Maro Joković	FP	8	206	80.5%	8	25	32.0%	15	8	2	6	7	13	53.8%	4		1	
6	Ivan Buljubašić	FP	8	88	34.4%	3	16	18.8%	6		3					13			2
7	Petar Muslim	FP	8	118	46.1%	2	18	11.1%	5	11		2				4	1		
8	Andro Bušlje	FP	8	115	44.9%	3	13	23.1%	1	7	5	4				13		1	3
9	Sandro Sukno	FP	8	210	82.0%	14	30	46.7%	7	11	7	3	11	16	68.8%	7	1	1	1
10	Samir Barać (C)	FP	8	135	52.7%	4	15	26.7%	4	2	1	1				9			
11	Igor Hinić	FP	8	105	41.0%	2	8	25.0%	2	11	3	5				3	1	1	
12	Paulo Obradović	FP	8	124	48.4%	5	12	41.7%	4	7	2	4	0	1	0.0%	9	1		1
13	Frano Vićan	GK	8	34	13.3%				1										
Team										6									
Total			8	256	100%	73	204	35.8%	55	107	35	37	19	32	59.4%	85	5	5	8
Against						42	230	18.3%	31	86	55	19	13	32	40.6%	82	5	8	7

Cap No.	Player	Pos	Saves/Shots		
Cap No.	Player	Pos	Saves	Shots	%
1	Josip Pavić	GK	85	121	70.2%
13	Frano Vićan	GK	10	16	62.5%
Total			95	137	69.3%

Source: Official Results Books (PDF): 2012 (p. 471).

=== 2008 (Hungary, 9th title) ===
* Edition of men's tournament: 25th

- Host city: Beijing, China
- Number of participating teams: 12
- Competition format: Round-robin pools advanced teams to classification matches
- Champion: Hungary (9th title; 1st place in preliminary A group)

Results
Match	Round	Date	Cap color	Opponent	Result	Goals for	Goals against	Goal diff.
Match 1/7	Preliminary round – Group A	10 August 2008	White	Montenegro	Drawn	10	10	0
Match 2/7	Preliminary round – Group A	12 August 2008	Blue	Greece	Won	17	6	11
Match 3/7	Preliminary round – Group A	14 August 2008	White	Spain	Won	8	5	3
Match 4/7	Preliminary round – Group A	16 August 2008	Blue	Australia	Won	13	12	1
Match 5/7	Preliminary round – Group A	18 August 2008	White	Canada	Won	12	3	9
Match 6/7	Semi-finals	22 August 2008	White	Montenegro	Won	11	9	2
Match 7/7	Gold medal match	24 August 2008	White	United States	Won	14	10	4
Total	Matches played: 7 • Wins: 6 • Ties: 1 • Defeats: 0 • Win %: 85.7%					85	55	30

Source: Official Results Books (PDF): 2008 (pp. 84, 92, 94, 104, 106, 156, 168).

- Head coach: (Hungary) Dénes Kemény (3rd title as head coach)
- Assistant coach: (Hungary) Csaba Mátéfalvy

Roster
Cap No.	Player	Pos	L/R	Height	Weight	Date of birth	Age of winning gold	Oly debut	ISHOF member
1	Zoltán Szécsi	GK	R	1.98 m (6 ft 6 in)	96 kg (212 lb)	22 December 1977	30 years, 246 days	No	2016
2	Tamás Varga	FP	R	2.01 m (6 ft 7 in)	105 kg (231 lb)	14 July 1975	33 years, 41 days	No	
3	Norbert Madaras	FP	L	1.91 m (6 ft 3 in)	91 kg (201 lb)	1 December 1979	28 years, 267 days	No	
4	Dénes Varga	FP	R	1.93 m (6 ft 4 in)	97 kg (214 lb)	29 March 1987	21 years, 148 days	Yes	
5	Tamás Kásás	FP	R	2.00 m (6 ft 7 in)	94 kg (207 lb)	20 July 1976	32 years, 35 days	No	2016
6	Norbert Hosnyánszky	FP	R	1.96 m (6 ft 5 in)	94 kg (207 lb)	4 March 1984	24 years, 173 days	Yes	
7	Gergely Kiss	FP	L	1.99 m (6 ft 6 in)	112 kg (247 lb)	21 September 1977	30 years, 338 days	No	2016
8	Tibor Benedek (C)	FP	L	1.90 m (6 ft 3 in)	96 kg (212 lb)	12 July 1972	36 years, 43 days	No	2016
9	Dániel Varga	FP	R	2.00 m (6 ft 7 in)	95 kg (209 lb)	25 September 1983	24 years, 334 days	Yes	
10	Péter Biros	FP	R	1.94 m (6 ft 4 in)	95 kg (209 lb)	5 April 1976	32 years, 141 days	No	2016
11	Gábor Kis	FP	R	1.94 m (6 ft 4 in)	108 kg (238 lb)	27 September 1982	25 years, 332 days	Yes	
12	Tamás Molnár	FP	R	1.93 m (6 ft 4 in)	104 kg (229 lb)	2 August 1975	33 years, 22 days	No	2016
13	István Gergely	GK	R	2.01 m (6 ft 7 in)	112 kg (247 lb)	20 August 1976	32 years, 4 days	No	
Average				1.96 m (6 ft 5 in)	100 kg (220 lb)	20 December 1978	29 years, 248 days		
Coach	Dénes Kemény					14 June 1954	54 years, 71 days		2011

Note: Dániel Varga and Dénes Varga are brothers.
Sources:

- Official Results Books (PDF): 2008 (p. 203);
- ISHOF.

Abbreviation

- MP – Matches played
- Min – Minutes
- G – Goals
- Sh – Shots
- AS – Assists
- TF – Turnover fouls
- ST – Steals
- BL – Blocked shots
- SP – Sprints
- 20S – 20 seconds exclusion
- Pen – Penalty
- EX – Exclusion

Statistics
Cap No.	Player	Pos	MP	Minutes played		Goals/Shots			AS	TF	ST	BL	Sprints			Personal fouls		
Cap No.	Player	Pos	MP	Min	%	G	Sh	%	AS	TF	ST	BL	Won	SP	%	20S	Pen	EX
1	Zoltán Szécsi	GK	7	151	67.4%						3							
2	Tamás Varga	FP	7	70	31.3%	0	9	0.0%		5		1				12		2
3	Norbert Madaras	FP	7	131	58.5%	9	19	47.4%	5	3	3		3	6	50.0%	5	1	1
4	Dénes Varga	FP	7	113	50.4%	10	18	55.6%	1	5	4	3	1	4	25.0%	3		
5	Tamás Kásás	FP	7	179	79.9%	8	29	27.6%	6	8	11	4	10	12	83.3%	6		
6	Norbert Hosnyánszky	FP	7	45	20.1%	2	7	28.6%		2	2	1				11	1	4
7	Gergely Kiss	FP	7	178	79.5%	9	25	36.0%	12	12	1	1	1	1	100%	9		
8	Tibor Benedek (C)	FP	7	128	57.1%	10	18	55.6%	3	6	6	1				6		
9	Dániel Varga	FP	7	108	48.2%	8	20	40.0%	3	5	3	3				9		1
10	Péter Biros	FP	7	176	78.6%	13	23	56.5%	3	4	8	8	3	5	60.0%	3	1	
11	Gábor Kis	FP	7	104	46.4%	6	9	66.7%	2	15	2	3				3		
12	Tamás Molnár	FP	7	111	49.6%	10	19	52.6%		21		2				6		
13	István Gergely	GK	7	73	32.6%	0	1	0.0%	1		4							
Team										2								
Total			7	224	100%	85	197	43.1%	36	88	47	27	18	28	64.3%	73	3	8
Against						55	195	28.2%	19	93	52	27	10	28	35.7%	74	7	9

Cap No.	Player	Pos	Saves/Shots		
Cap No.	Player	Pos	Saves	Shots	%
1	Zoltán Szécsi	GK	42	83	50.6%
13	István Gergely	GK	24	38	63.2%
Total			66	121	54.5%

Source: Official Results Books (PDF): 2008 (p. 202).

=== 2004 (Hungary, 8th title) ===
* Edition of men's tournament: 24th

- Host city: Athens, Greece
- Number of participating teams: 12
- Competition format: Round-robin pools advanced teams to classification matches
- Champion: Hungary (8th title; 1st place in preliminary A group)

Results
Match	Round	Date	Cap color	Opponent	Result	Goals for	Goals against	Goal diff.
Match 1/7	Preliminary round – Group A	15 August 2004	Blue	Serbia and Montenegro	Won	6	4	2
Match 2/7	Preliminary round – Group A	17 August 2004	White	Croatia	Won	10	8	2
Match 3/7	Preliminary round – Group A	19 August 2004	Blue	United States	Won	7	5	2
Match 4/7	Preliminary round – Group A	21 August 2004	Blue	Kazakhstan	Won	14	4	10
Match 5/7	Preliminary round – Group A	23 August 2004	Blue	Russia	Won	7	6	1
Match 6/7	Semi-finals	27 August 2004	White	Russia	Won	7	5	2
Match 7/7	Gold medal match	29 August 2004	White	Serbia and Montenegro	Won	8	7	1
Total	Matches played: 7 • Wins: 7 • Ties: 0 • Defeats: 0 • Win %: 100%					59	39	20

Source: Official Results Books (PDF): 2004 (pp. 93, 101, 105, 109, 116, 164, 173).

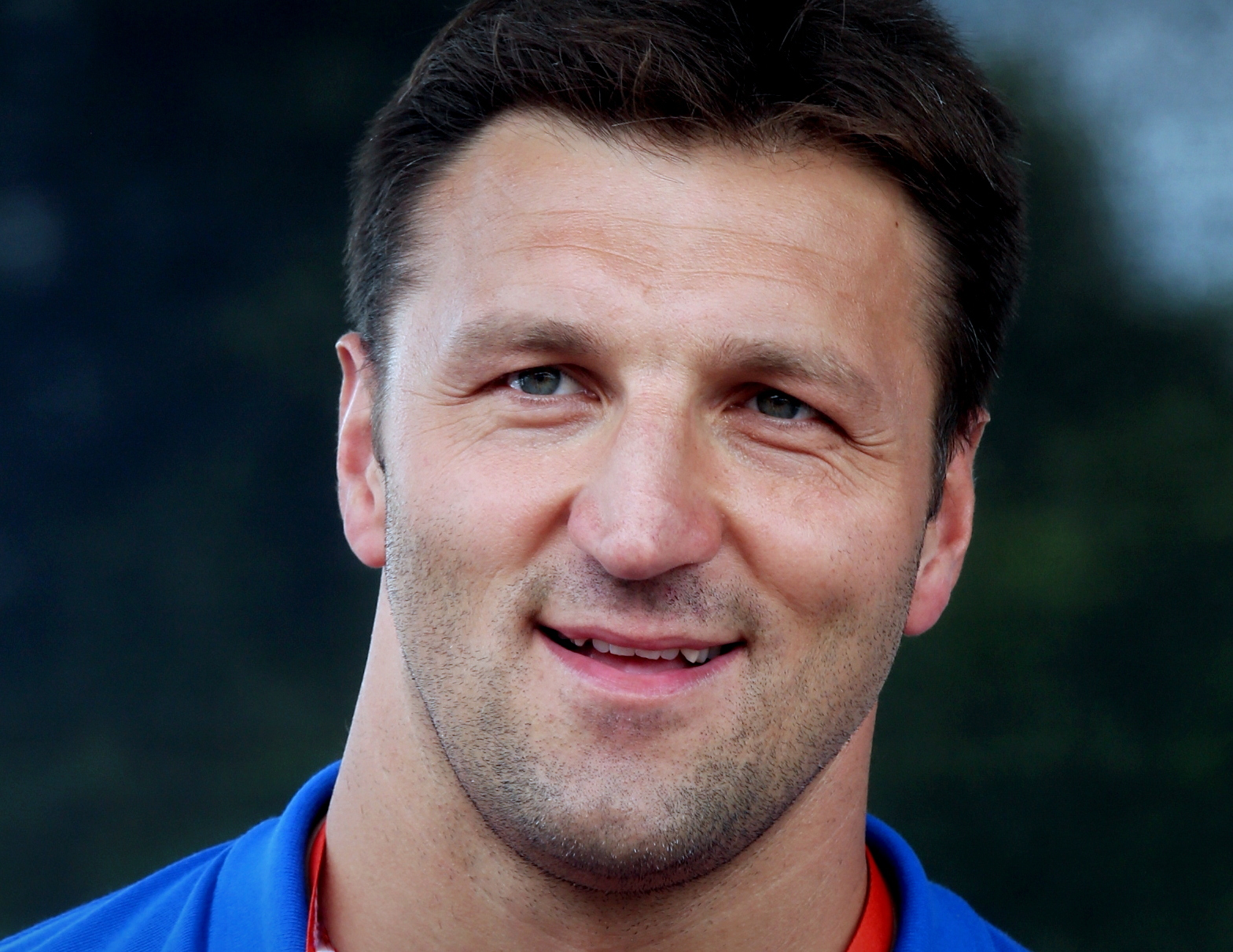
Gergely Kiss scored 14 goals at the 2004 Olympics, helping Hungary win gold. He was named the Most Valuable Player of the men's water polo tournament.

- Head coach: (Hungary) Dénes Kemény (2nd title as head coach)
- Assistant coach: (Hungary) Csaba Mátéfalvy

Roster
Cap No.	Player	Pos	L/R	Height	Weight	Date of birth	Age of winning gold	Oly debut	ISHOF member
1	Zoltán Szécsi	GK	R	1.98 m (6 ft 6 in)	93 kg (205 lb)	22 December 1977	26 years, 251 days	No	2016
2	Tamás Varga	FP	R	2.01 m (6 ft 7 in)	105 kg (231 lb)	14 July 1975	29 years, 46 days	Yes	
3	Norbert Madaras	FP	L	1.91 m (6 ft 3 in)	87 kg (192 lb)	1 December 1979	24 years, 272 days	Yes	
4	Ádám Steinmetz	FP	R	1.97 m (6 ft 6 in)	95 kg (209 lb)	11 August 1980	24 years, 18 days	Yes	
5	Tamás Kásás	FP	R	2.00 m (6 ft 7 in)	90 kg (198 lb)	20 July 1976	28 years, 40 days	No	2016
6	Attila Vári	FP	R	2.00 m (6 ft 7 in)	93 kg (205 lb)	26 February 1976	28 years, 185 days	No	
7	Gergely Kiss	FP	L	1.99 m (6 ft 6 in)	100 kg (220 lb)	21 September 1977	26 years, 343 days	No	2016
8	Tibor Benedek (C)	FP	L	1.90 m (6 ft 3 in)	96 kg (212 lb)	12 July 1972	32 years, 48 days	No	2016
9	Rajmund Fodor	FP	R	1.90 m (6 ft 3 in)	94 kg (207 lb)	21 February 1976	28 years, 190 days	No	
10	István Gergely	GK	R	2.01 m (6 ft 7 in)	110 kg (243 lb)	20 August 1976	28 years, 9 days	No	
11	Barnabás Steinmetz	FP	R	1.96 m (6 ft 5 in)	98 kg (216 lb)	6 October 1975	28 years, 328 days	No	
12	Tamás Molnár	FP	R	1.93 m (6 ft 4 in)	98 kg (216 lb)	2 August 1975	29 years, 27 days	No	2016
13	Péter Biros	FP	R	1.94 m (6 ft 4 in)	95 kg (209 lb)	5 April 1976	28 years, 146 days	No	2016
Average				1.96 m (6 ft 5 in)	96 kg (212 lb)	20 September 1976	27 years, 344 days		
Coach	Dénes Kemény					14 June 1954	50 years, 76 days		2011

Note: Ádám Steinmetz and Barnabás Steinmetz are brothers.
Sources:

- Official Results Books (PDF): 2004 (p. 208);
- ISHOF.

Abbreviation

- MP – Matches played
- Min – Minutes
- G – Goals
- Sh – Shots
- AS – Assists
- TF – Turnover fouls
- ST – Steals
- BL – Blocked shots
- SP – Sprints
- 20S – 20 seconds exclusion
- Pen – Penalty
- EX – Exclusion

Statistics
Cap No.	Player	Pos	MP	Minutes played		Goals/Shots			AS	TF	ST	BL	Sprints			Personal fouls		
Cap No.	Player	Pos	MP	Min	%	G	Sh	%	AS	TF	ST	BL	Won	SP	%	20S	Pen	EX
1	Zoltán Szécsi	GK	7	168	85.7%						6							
2	Tamás Varga	FP	7	48	24.5%	3	5	60.0%		3	1	1				12		2
3	Norbert Madaras	FP	7	76	38.8%	5	10	50.0%	1	2	5		3	9	33.3%	3		
4	Ádám Steinmetz	FP	7	82	41.8%	3	5	60.0%	1	11	3	3						
5	Tamás Kásás	FP	7	183	93.4%	14	30	46.7%	3	7	8	6	7	9	77.8%	3		
6	Attila Vári	FP	7	70	35.7%	2	18	11.1%	2		3	1				11		1
7	Gergely Kiss	FP	7	168	85.7%	14	31	45.2%	7	2	5	3				7		
8	Tibor Benedek (C)	FP	7	142	72.4%	5	21	23.8%	4	8	7	1				6	1	
9	Rajmund Fodor	FP	7	81	41.3%	4	10	40.0%	3	2	3					2		
10	István Gergely	GK	7	28	14.3%				1									
11	Barnabás Steinmetz	FP	7	56	28.6%	0	1	0.0%			5	1				12		1
12	Tamás Molnár	FP	7	107	54.6%	2	7	28.6%		15	1	2				2		
13	Péter Biros	FP	7	163	83.2%	7	27	25.9%	2	1	5	2	4	10	40.0%	4		
Total			7	196	100%	59	165	35.8%	24	51	52	20	14	28	50.0%	62	1	4
Against						39	129	30.2%	12	85	36	19	13	28	46.4%	70	7	10

Cap No.	Player	Pos	Saves/Shots		
Cap No.	Player	Pos	Saves	Shots	%
1	Zoltán Szécsi	GK	40	75	53.3%
10	István Gergely	GK	8	12	66.7%
Total			48	87	55.2%

Source: Official Results Books (PDF): 2004 (p. 207).

=== 2000 (Hungary, 7th title) ===
* Edition of men's tournament: 23rd

- Host city: Sydney, Australia
- Number of participating teams: 12
- Competition format: Round-robin pools advanced teams to classification matches
- Champion: Hungary (7th title; 3rd place in preliminary B group)

Results
Match	Round	Date	Cap color	Opponent	Result	Goals for	Goals against	Goal diff.
Match 1/8	Preliminary round – Group B	23 September 2000	Blue	Greece	Won	7	4	3
Match 2/8	Preliminary round – Group B	24 September 2000	White	Netherlands	Won	16	8	8
Match 3/8	Preliminary round – Group B	25 September 2000	Blue	Croatia	Lost	7	8	–1
Match 4/8	Preliminary round – Group B	26 September 2000	White	United States	Won	10	9	1
Match 5/8	Preliminary round – Group B	27 September 2000	Blue	FR Yugoslavia (Note: After the breakup of Yugoslavia, FR Yugoslavia men's national water polo team participated at the 1996 and 2000 Olympics, and won a bronze medal in 2000. In 2003, after the country was renamed from FR Yugoslavia to Serbia and Montenegro, the team was also renamed to "Serbia and Montenegro men's national water polo team".)	Lost	9	10	–1
Match 6/8	Quarter-finals	29 September 2000	Blue	Italy	Won	8	5	3
Match 7/8	Semi-finals	30 September 2000	White	FR Yugoslavia	Won	8	7	1
Match 8/8	Gold medal match	1 October 2000	Blue	Russia	Won	13	6	7
Total	Matches played: 8 • Wins: 6 • Ties: 0 • Defeats: 2 • Win %: 75.0%					78	57	21

Source: Official Results Books (PDF): 2000 (pp. 45, 50, 55, 78, 81, 84, 87, 90).

- Head coach: (Hungary) Dénes Kemény (1st title as head coach)

Roster
Cap No.	Player	Pos	L/R	Height	Weight	Date of birth	Age of winning gold	Oly debut	ISHOF member
1	Zoltán Kósz	GK	R	1.92 m (6 ft 4 in)	93 kg (205 lb)	26 November 1967	32 years, 310 days	No	
2	Bulcsú Székely	FP	R	1.80 m (5 ft 11 in)	82 kg (181 lb)	2 June 1976	24 years, 121 days	Yes	
3	Tamás Märcz	FP	R	1.86 m (6 ft 1 in)	82 kg (181 lb)	17 July 1974	26 years, 76 days	Yes	
4	Zsolt Varga	FP	R	1.93 m (6 ft 4 in)	96 kg (212 lb)	9 March 1972	28 years, 206 days	No	
5	Tamás Kásás	FP	R	2.00 m (6 ft 7 in)	90 kg (198 lb)	20 July 1976	24 years, 73 days	No	2016
6	Attila Vári	FP	R	2.00 m (6 ft 7 in)	93 kg (205 lb)	26 February 1976	24 years, 218 days	Yes	
7	Gergely Kiss	FP	L	1.99 m (6 ft 6 in)	100 kg (220 lb)	21 September 1977	23 years, 10 days	Yes	2016
8	Tibor Benedek	FP	L	1.90 m (6 ft 3 in)	96 kg (212 lb)	12 July 1972	28 years, 81 days	No	2016
9	Rajmund Fodor	FP	R	1.90 m (6 ft 3 in)	94 kg (207 lb)	21 February 1976	24 years, 223 days	No	
10	Zoltán Szécsi	GK	R	1.98 m (6 ft 6 in)	93 kg (205 lb)	22 December 1977	22 years, 284 days	Yes	2016
11	Barnabás Steinmetz	FP	R	1.96 m (6 ft 5 in)	98 kg (216 lb)	6 October 1975	24 years, 361 days	Yes	
12	Tamás Molnár	FP	R	1.93 m (6 ft 4 in)	98 kg (216 lb)	2 August 1975	25 years, 60 days	Yes	2016
13	Péter Biros	FP	R	1.94 m (6 ft 4 in)	95 kg (209 lb)	5 April 1976	24 years, 179 days	Yes	2016
Average				1.93 m (6 ft 4 in)	93 kg (205 lb)	21 January 1975	25 years, 254 days		
Coach	Dénes Kemény					14 June 1954	46 years, 109 days		2011

Sources:

- Official Results Books (PDF): 2000 (pp. 45, 50, 55, 78, 81, 84, 87, 90);
- Olympedia: 2000 (men's tournament);
- ISHOF.

Abbreviation

- MP – Matches played
- Min – Minutes
- G – Goals
- Sh – Shots
- AS – Assists
- TF – Turnover fouls
- ST – Steals
- BL – Blocked shots
- SP – Sprints
- 20S – 20 seconds exclusion
- Pen – Penalty
- EX – Exclusion

Statistics
Cap No.	Player	Pos	MP	Minutes played		Goals/Shots			AS	TF	ST	BL	Sprints			Personal fouls		
Cap No.	Player	Pos	MP	Min	%	G	Sh	%	AS	TF	ST	BL	Won	SP	%	20S	Pen	EX
1	Zoltán Kósz	GK	8	203	90.6%						7							
2	Bulcsú Székely	FP	8	35	15.6%	2	5	40.0%	2			1						
3	Tamás Märcz	FP	8	36	16.1%	0	3	0.0%	1	1	1	3				2		
4	Zsolt Varga	FP	8	64	28.6%	3	7	42.9%	5	5		2				2		
5	Tamás Kásás	FP	8	211	94.2%	12	33	36.4%	11	1	7	4	15	29	51.7%	7		
6	Attila Vári	FP	8	98	43.8%	10	25	40.0%		1	2	2				19	1	
7	Gergely Kiss	FP	8	155	69.2%	14	24	58.3%	10	2	2	4				4		
8	Tibor Benedek	FP	8	168	75.0%	9	21	42.9%	3	8	4	2				4		
9	Rajmund Fodor	FP	8	154	68.8%	8	15	53.3%	4	1	2	7				7		
10	Zoltán Szécsi	GK	8	21	9.4%					1								
11	Barnabás Steinmetz	FP	8	164	73.2%	6	16	37.5%		3	10	4				16		
12	Tamás Molnár	FP	8	142	63.4%	10	23	43.5%	3	26	2	3	1	1	100%	4		
13	Péter Biros	FP	8	117	52.2%	4	16	25.0%	2	5	1	6	2	2	100%	5		
Total			8	224	100%	78	188	41.5%	41	54	38	38	18	32	56.2%	70	1	0
Against						57	202	28.2%	34	30	36	23	14	32	43.8%	91	3	5

Cap No.	Player	Pos	Saves/Shots		
Cap No.	Player	Pos	Saves	Shots	%
1	Zoltán Kósz	GK	58	112	51.8%
10	Zoltán Szécsi	GK	6	9	66.7%
Total			64	121	52.9%

Source: Official Results Books (PDF): 2000 (pp. 45, 50, 55, 78, 81, 84, 87, 90).

=== 1996 (Spain, 1st title) ===
* Edition of men's tournament: 22nd

- Host city: Atlanta, United States
- Number of participating teams: 12
- Competition format: Round-robin pools advanced teams to classification matches
- Champion: Spain (1st title; 3rd place in preliminary A group)

Match	Round	Date	Opponent	Result	Goals for	Goals against	Goal diff.
Match 1/8	Preliminary round – Group A	20 July 1996	Germany	Won	9	3	6
Match 2/8	Preliminary round – Group A	21 July 1996	Netherlands	Won	8	7	1
Match 3/8	Preliminary round – Group A	22 July 1996	FR Yugoslavia	Lost	7	9	–2
Match 4/8	Preliminary round – Group A	23 July 1996	Hungary	Lost	7	8	–1
Match 5/8	Preliminary round – Group A	24 July 1996	Russia	Won	8	6	2
Match 6/8	Quarter-finals	26 July 1996	United States	Won	5	4	1
Match 7/8	Semi-finals	27 July 1996	Hungary	Won	7	6	1
Match 8/8	Gold medal match	28 July 1996	Croatia	Won	7	5	2
Total	Matches played: 8 • Wins: 6 • Ties: 0 • Defeats: 2 • Win %: 75.0%				58	48	10

Source: Official Reports (PDF): 1996 (p. 57, 58, 59, 60, 61, 70, 71, 73).

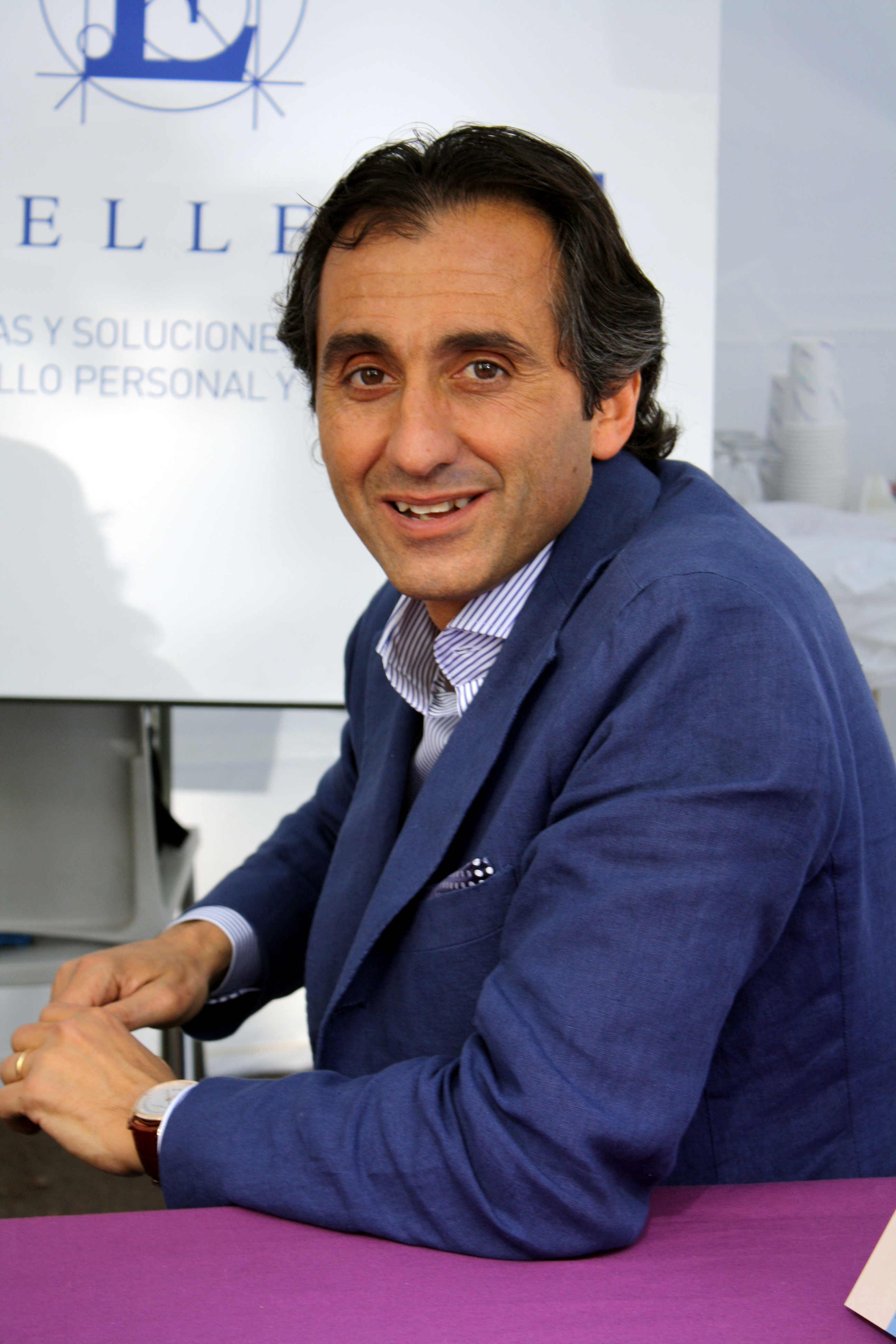
34-year-old Manuel Estiarte, the captain of Spain, won a gold medal during his fifth Olympics.

- Head coach: (Spain) Juan Jané (1st title as head coach)
- Assistant coach: (Spain) Santiago Fernandez de Cuevas

Roster
Cap No.	Player	Pos	L/R	Height	Weight	Date of birth	Age of winning gold	Oly debut	ISHOF member
1	Jesús Rollán	GK	R	1.87 m (6 ft 2 in)	87 kg (192 lb)	4 April 1968	28 years, 115 days	No	2012
2	Josep María Abarca	FP		1.86 m (6 ft 1 in)	83 kg (183 lb)	19 June 1974	22 years, 39 days	Yes	
3	Sergi Pedrerol	FP	L	1.90 m (6 ft 3 in)	78 kg (172 lb)	16 December 1969	26 years, 225 days	No	
4	Ángel Andreo	GK	R	1.91 m (6 ft 3 in)	83 kg (183 lb)	3 December 1972	23 years, 238 days	Yes	
5	Manuel Estiarte (C)	FP	R	1.78 m (5 ft 10 in)	62 kg (137 lb)	26 October 1961	34 years, 276 days	No	2007
6	Daniel Ballart	FP	R	1.78 m (5 ft 10 in)	73 kg (161 lb)	17 March 1973	23 years, 133 days	No	
7	Jorge Payá	FP		1.85 m (6 ft 1 in)	78 kg (172 lb)	10 July 1963	33 years, 18 days	No	
8	Iván Moro	FP	R	1.86 m (6 ft 1 in)	84 kg (185 lb)	25 December 1974	21 years, 216 days	Yes	
9	Jordi Sans	FP		1.80 m (5 ft 11 in)	70 kg (154 lb)	3 August 1965	30 years, 360 days	No	
10	Salvador Gómez	FP	R	1.94 m (6 ft 4 in)	96 kg (212 lb)	11 March 1968	28 years, 139 days	No	
11	Miki Oca	FP		1.87 m (6 ft 2 in)	83 kg (183 lb)	15 April 1970	26 years, 104 days	No	
12	Carles Sanz	FP		1.77 m (5 ft 10 in)	88 kg (194 lb)	25 May 1975	21 years, 64 days	Yes	
13	Pedro García	FP		1.93 m (6 ft 4 in)	83 kg (183 lb)	9 December 1968	27 years, 232 days	No	
Average				1.86 m (6 ft 1 in)	81 kg (179 lb)	23 October 1969	26 years, 279 days		
Coach	Juan Jané			1.87 m (6 ft 2 in)		31 May 1953	43 years, 58 days		

Sources:

- Official Reports (PDF): 1996 (p. 57, 58, 59, 60, 61, 70, 71, 73);
- Olympedia: 1996 (men's tournament);
- Sports Reference: 1996 (men's tournament);
- ISHOF.

Statistics
Cap No.	Player	Pos	Matches played	Goals/Shots		
Cap No.	Player	Pos	Matches played	Goals	Shots	%
1	Jesús Rollán	GK	8			
2	Josep María Abarca	FP	8	0	1	0.0%
3	Sergi Pedrerol	FP	8	1	13	7.7%
4	Ángel Andreo	GK	8			
5	Manuel Estiarte (C)	FP	8	13	33	39.4%
6	Daniel Ballart	FP	8	3	13	23.1%
7	Jorge Payá	FP	8	1	2	50.0%
8	Iván Moro	FP	8	2	15	13.3%
9	Jordi Sans	FP	8	7	18	38.9%
10	Salvador Gómez	FP	8	12	38	31.6%
11	Miki Oca	FP	8	9	27	33.3%
12	Carles Sanz	FP	8	3	11	27.3%
13	Pedro García	FP	8	7	29	24.1%
Total			8	58	200	29.0%
Against				48	200	24.0%

Cap No.	Player	Pos	Saves/Shots		
Cap No.	Player	Pos	Saves	Shots	%
1	Jesús Rollán	GK	62	110	56.4%
4	Ángel Andreo	GK			
Total			62	110	56.4%

Source: Official Reports (PDF): 1996 (p. 57, 58, 59, 60, 61, 70, 71, 73).

=== 1992 (Italy, 3rd title) ===
* Edition of men's tournament: 21st

- Host city: Barcelona, Spain
- Number of participating teams: 12
- Competition format: Round-robin pools advanced teams to classification matches
- Champion: Italy (3rd title; 2nd place in preliminary B group)

Match	Round	Date	Opponent	Result	Goals for	Goals against	Goal diff.
Match 1/7	Preliminary round – Group B	1 August 1992	Hungary	Drawn	7	7	0
Match 2/7	Preliminary round – Group B	2 August 1992	Netherlands	Won	6	4	2
Match 3/7	Preliminary round – Group B	3 August 1992	Cuba	Won	11	8	3
Match 4/7	Preliminary round – Group B	5 August 1992	Spain	Drawn	9	9	0
Match 5/7	Preliminary round – Group B	6 August 1992	Greece	Won	8	6	2
Match 6/7	Semi-finals	8 August 1992	(International Olympic Committee) Unified Team (Note: In 1992, 12 of the 15 former Soviet Republics competed together as the Unified Team and marched under the Olympic Flag in the Barcelona Games.)	Won	9	8	1
Match 7/7	Gold medal match	9 August 1992	Spain	Won	9	8	1
Total	Matches played: 7 • Wins: 5 • Ties: 2 • Defeats: 0 • Win %: 71.4%				59	50	9

Source: Official Reports (PDF): 1992 (pp. 391, 392, 393, 394, 395, 399, 400).

- Head coach: (Croatia) Ratko Rudić (3rd title as head coach)
- Assistant coach: (Italy) Giuseppe Castellucci

Roster
Cap No.	Player	Pos	L/R	Height	Weight	Date of birth	Age of winning gold	Oly debut	ISHOF member
1	Francesco Attolico	GK		1.93 m (6 ft 4 in)	85 kg (187 lb)	23 March 1963	29 years, 139 days	Yes	
2	Marco D'Altrui	FP		1.80 m (5 ft 11 in)	72 kg (159 lb)	25 April 1964	28 years, 106 days	No	2010
3	Alessandro Bovo	FP		1.85 m (6 ft 1 in)	78 kg (172 lb)	1 January 1969	23 years, 221 days	Yes	
4	Pino Porzio	FP				26 February 1967	25 years, 165 days	Yes	
5	Sandro Campagna	FP	R	1.82 m (6 ft 0 in)	80 kg (176 lb)	26 June 1963	29 years, 44 days	No	2019
6	Paolo Caldarella	FP		1.87 m (6 ft 2 in)	88 kg (194 lb)	20 September 1964	27 years, 324 days	No	
7	Mario Fiorillo	FP		1.79 m (5 ft 10 in)	70 kg (154 lb)	16 December 1962	29 years, 237 days	No	
8	Francesco Porzio	FP	L	1.85 m (6 ft 1 in)	83 kg (183 lb)	26 January 1966	26 years, 196 days	No	
9	Amedeo Pomilio	FP	L	1.78 m (5 ft 10 in)	74 kg (163 lb)	11 February 1967	25 years, 180 days	Yes	
10	Ferdinando Gandolfi	FP				5 January 1967	25 years, 217 days	Yes	
11	Massimiliano Ferretti	FP		1.94 m (6 ft 4 in)	85 kg (187 lb)	22 June 1966	26 years, 48 days	No	
12	Carlo Silipo	FP	R	1.99 m (6 ft 6 in)	95 kg (209 lb)	10 September 1971	20 years, 334 days	Yes	
13	Gianni Averaimo	GK		1.83 m (6 ft 0 in)	84 kg (185 lb)	10 September 1964	27 years, 334 days	No	
Average				1.86 m (6 ft 1 in)	81 kg (179 lb)	29 December 1965	26 years, 224 days		
Coach	Ratko Rudić			1.88 m (6 ft 2 in)		7 June 1948	44 years, 63 days		2007

Note: Francesco Porzio and Pino Porzio are brothers.
Sources:

- Official Reports (PDF): 1992 (pp. 391, 392, 393, 394, 395, 399, 400);
- Olympedia: 1992 (men's tournament);
- Sports Reference: 1992 (men's tournament);
- ISHOF.

Statistics
Cap No.	Player	Pos	Matches played	Goals/Shots		
Cap No.	Player	Pos	Matches played	Goals	Shots	%
1	Francesco Attolico	GK	7			
2	Marco D'Altrui	FP	7	3	8	37.5%
3	Alessandro Bovo	FP	7	1	8	12.5%
4	Pino Porzio	FP	7	3	11	27.3%
5	Sandro Campagna	FP	7	6	14	42.9%
6	Paolo Caldarella	FP	7	6	14	42.9%
7	Mario Fiorillo	FP	7	4	13	30.8%
8	Francesco Porzio	FP	7	10	27	37.0%
9	Amedeo Pomilio	FP	7	3	10	30.0%
10	Ferdinando Gandolfi	FP	7	6	15	40.0%
11	Massimiliano Ferretti	FP	7	14	34	41.2%
12	Carlo Silipo	FP	7	3	15	20.0%
13	Gianni Averaimo	GK	7			
Total			8	59	169	34.9%
Against				50	172	29.1%

Source: Official Reports (PDF): 1992 (pp. 391, 392, 393, 394, 395, 399, 400).

=== 1988 (Yugoslavia, 3rd title) ===
* Edition of men's tournament: 20th

- Host city: Seoul, South Korea
- Number of participating teams: 12
- Competition format: Round-robin pools advanced teams to classification matches
- Champion: Yugoslavia (3rd title; 1st place in preliminary B group)

Match	Round	Date	Opponent	Result	Goals for	Goals against	Goal diff.
Match 1/7	Preliminary round – Group B	21 September 1988	United States	Lost	6	7	–1
Match 2/7	Preliminary round – Group B	22 September 1988	Hungary	Won	10	9	1
Match 3/7	Preliminary round – Group B	23 September 1988	Greece	Won	17	7	10
Match 4/7	Preliminary round – Group B	26 September 1988	Spain	Won	10	8	2
Match 5/7	Preliminary round – Group B	27 September 1988	China	Won	17	7	10
Match 6/7	Semi-finals	30 September 1988	West Germany	Won	14	10	4
Match 7/7	Gold medal match	1 October 1988	United States	Won	9	7	2
Total	Matches played: 7 • Wins: 6 • Ties: 0 • Defeats: 1 • Win %: 85.7%				83	55	28

Source: Official Reports (PDF): 1988 (pp. 593, 594, 595, 597).

- Head coach: (Socialist Federal Republic of Yugoslavia) Ratko Rudić (2nd title as head coach)

Roster
Cap No.	Player	Pos	L/R	Height	Weight	Date of birth	Age of winning gold	Oly debut	Goals	ISHOF member
1	Aleksandar Šoštar	GK		1.96 m (6 ft 5 in)	102 kg (225 lb)	21 January 1964	24 years, 254 days	Yes	0	2011
2	Deni Lušić	FP		1.90 m (6 ft 3 in)	95 kg (209 lb)	14 April 1962	26 years, 170 days	No	10	
3	Dubravko Šimenc	FP	R	2.01 m (6 ft 7 in)	115 kg (254 lb)	2 November 1966	21 years, 334 days	Yes	3	
4	Perica Bukić	FP		1.98 m (6 ft 6 in)	85 kg (187 lb)	20 February 1966	22 years, 224 days	No	10	2008
5	Veselin Đuho	FP		1.87 m (6 ft 2 in)	95 kg (209 lb)	5 January 1960	28 years, 270 days	No	9	
6	Dragan Andrić	FP		1.92 m (6 ft 4 in)	91 kg (201 lb)	6 June 1962	26 years, 117 days	No	11	
7	Mirko Vičević	FP		1.92 m (6 ft 4 in)	82 kg (181 lb)	30 June 1968	20 years, 93 days	Yes	3	
8	Igor Gočanin	FP		1.90 m (6 ft 3 in)	82 kg (181 lb)	24 July 1966	22 years, 69 days	Yes	5	
9	Mislav Bezmalinović	FP		1.97 m (6 ft 6 in)	88 kg (194 lb)	11 May 1967	21 years, 143 days	Yes	4	
10	Tomislav Paškvalin	FP	L	2.04 m (6 ft 8 in)	105 kg (231 lb)	29 August 1961	27 years, 33 days	No	6	
11	Igor Milanović	FP		1.95 m (6 ft 5 in)	97 kg (214 lb)	18 December 1965	22 years, 288 days	No	16	2006
12	Goran Rađenović	FP		1.97 m (6 ft 6 in)	95 kg (209 lb)	4 November 1966	21 years, 332 days	Yes	6	
13	Renco Posinković	GK		1.97 m (6 ft 6 in)	91 kg (201 lb)	4 January 1964	24 years, 271 days	Yes	0	
Average				1.95 m (6 ft 5 in)	94 kg (207 lb)	26 October 1964	23 years, 341 days	Total	83	
Coach	Ratko Rudić			1.88 m (6 ft 2 in)		7 June 1948	40 years, 116 days			2007

Sources:

- Official Reports (PDF): 1988 (pp. 593, 594, 595, 597);
- Olympedia: 1988 (men's tournament);
- Sports Reference: 1988 (men's tournament);
- ISHOF.

=== 1984 (Yugoslavia, 2nd title) ===
* Edition of men's tournament: 19th

- Host city: Los Angeles, United States
- Number of participating teams: 12
- Competition format: Round-robin pools advanced teams to the round-robin final pool
- Champion: Yugoslavia (2nd title; 1st place in preliminary A group; 1st place in final D group)

Match	Round	Date	Opponent	Result	Goals for	Goals against	Goal diff.
Match 1/7	Preliminary round – Group A	1 August 1984	Canada	Won	13	4	9
Match 2/7	Preliminary round – Group A	2 August 1984	China	Won	12	7	5
Match 3/7	Preliminary round – Group A	3 August 1984	Netherlands	Won	9	5	4
Match 4/7	Final round – Group D	6 August 1984	Australia	Won	9	6	3
Match 5/7	Final round – Group D	7 August 1984	West Germany	Won	10	9	1
Match 6/7	Final round – Group D	9 August 1984	Spain	Won	14	8	6
Match 7/7	Final round – Group D	10 August 1984	United States	Drawn	5	5	0
Total	Matches played: 7 • Wins: 6 • Ties: 1 • Defeats: 0 • Win %: 85.7%				72	44	28

Source: Official Reports (PDF): 1984 (pp. 528, 529, 530, 531, 532, 533).

- Head coach: (Socialist Federal Republic of Yugoslavia) Ratko Rudić (1st title as head coach)

Roster
Cap No.	Player	Pos	L/R	Height	Weight	Date of birth	Age of winning gold	Oly debut	Goals	ISHOF member
1	Milorad Krivokapić	GK		1.87 m (6 ft 2 in)	85 kg (187 lb)	8 January 1956	28 years, 215 days	No	0	
2	Deni Lušić	FP		1.90 m (6 ft 3 in)	95 kg (209 lb)	14 April 1962	22 years, 118 days	Yes	7	
3	Zoran Petrović	FP		2.03 m (6 ft 8 in)	98 kg (216 lb)	22 August 1960	23 years, 354 days	Yes	0	
4	Božo Vuletić	FP		1.86 m (6 ft 1 in)	90 kg (198 lb)	1 July 1958	26 years, 40 days	Yes	5	
5	Veselin Đuho	FP		1.87 m (6 ft 2 in)	95 kg (209 lb)	5 January 1960	24 years, 218 days	Yes	8	
6	Zoran Roje	FP		1.93 m (6 ft 4 in)	93 kg (205 lb)	7 October 1955	28 years, 308 days	No	7	
7	Milivoj Bebić	FP		1.88 m (6 ft 2 in)	88 kg (194 lb)	29 August 1959	24 years, 347 days	No	16	2013
8	Perica Bukić	FP		1.98 m (6 ft 6 in)	85 kg (187 lb)	20 February 1966	18 years, 172 days	Yes	0	2008
9	Goran Sukno	FP		1.88 m (6 ft 2 in)	86 kg (190 lb)	6 April 1959	25 years, 126 days	Yes	6	
10	Tomislav Paškvalin	FP	L	2.04 m (6 ft 8 in)	105 kg (231 lb)	29 August 1961	22 years, 347 days	Yes	11	
11	Igor Milanović	FP		1.95 m (6 ft 5 in)	97 kg (214 lb)	18 December 1965	18 years, 236 days	Yes	6	2006
12	Dragan Andrić	FP		1.92 m (6 ft 4 in)	91 kg (201 lb)	6 June 1962	22 years, 65 days	Yes	6	
13	Andrija Popović	GK		1.93 m (6 ft 4 in)	86 kg (190 lb)	22 September 1959	24 years, 323 days	Yes	0	
Average				1.93 m (6 ft 4 in)	92 kg (203 lb)	14 August 1960	23 years, 362 days	Total	72	
Coach	Ratko Rudić			1.88 m (6 ft 2 in)		7 June 1948	36 years, 64 days			2007

Sources:

- Official Reports (PDF): 1984 (pp. 528, 529, 530, 531, 532, 533);
- Olympedia: 1984 (men's tournament);
- Sports Reference: 1984 (men's tournament);
- ISHOF.

=== 1980 (Soviet Union, 2nd title) ===
* Edition of men's tournament: 18th

- Host city: Moscow, Soviet Union
- Number of participating teams: 12
- Competition format: Round-robin pools advanced teams to the round-robin final pool
- Champion: Soviet Union (2nd title; 1st place in preliminary A group; 1st place in final A group)

Match	Round	Date	Opponent	Result	Goals for	Goals against	Goal diff.
Match 1/8	Preliminary round – Group A	20 July 1980	(International Olympic Committee) Italy	Won	8	6	2
Match 2/8	Preliminary round – Group A	21 July 1980	(International Olympic Committee) Spain	Won	4	3	1
Match 3/8	Preliminary round – Group A	22 July 1980	Sweden	Won	12	1	11
Match 4/8	Final round – Group A	24 July 1980	Hungary	Won	5	4	1
Match 5/8	Final round – Group A	25 July 1980	(International Olympic Committee) Spain	Won	6	2	4
Match 6/8	Final round – Group A	26 July 1980	Cuba	Won	8	5	3
Match 7/8	Final round – Group A	28 July 1980	(International Olympic Committee) Netherlands	Won	7	3	4
Match 8/8	Final round – Group A	29 July 1980	Yugoslavia	Won	8	7	1
Total	Matches played: 8 • Wins: 8 • Ties: 0 • Defeats: 0 • Win %: 100%				58	31	27

Source: Official Reports (PDF): 1980 (pp. 497, 500, 501, 502).

- Head coach: (Soviet Union) Boris Popov (1st title as head coach)

Roster
Cap No.	Player	Pos	Height	Weight	Date of birth	Age of winning gold	Oly debut	Goals	ISHOF member
1	Yevgeny Sharonov	GK	1.89 m (6 ft 2 in)	96 kg (212 lb)	11 December 1958	21 years, 231 days	Yes	0	2003
2	Sergey Kotenko	FP	1.76 m (5 ft 9 in)	78 kg (172 lb)	2 December 1956	23 years, 240 days	No	9	
3	Vladimir Akimov	FP	1.84 m (6 ft 0 in)	80 kg (176 lb)	20 July 1953	27 years, 9 days	Yes	3	
4	Yevgeny Grishin	FP	1.89 m (6 ft 2 in)	93 kg (205 lb)	1 October 1959	20 years, 302 days	Yes	5	
5	Mait Riisman	FP	1.79 m (5 ft 10 in)	83 kg (183 lb)	23 September 1956	23 years, 310 days	Yes	4	
6	Aleksandr Kabanov	FP	1.81 m (5 ft 11 in)	84 kg (185 lb)	11 June 1948	32 years, 48 days	No	5	2001
7	Aleksei Barkalov	FP	1.80 m (5 ft 11 in)	82 kg (181 lb)	18 February 1946	34 years, 162 days	No	8	1993
8	Erkin Shagaev	FP	1.78 m (5 ft 10 in)	74 kg (163 lb)	12 February 1959	21 years, 168 days	Yes	5	
9	Giorgi Mshvenieradze	FP	1.88 m (6 ft 2 in)	104 kg (229 lb)	12 August 1960	19 years, 352 days	Yes	9	
10	Mikhail Ivanov	FP	1.88 m (6 ft 2 in)	98 kg (216 lb)	18 April 1958	22 years, 102 days	Yes	10	
11	Viacheslav Sobchenko	GK	1.87 m (6 ft 2 in)	86 kg (190 lb)	18 April 1949	31 years, 102 days	No	0	
Average			1.84 m (6 ft 0 in)	87 kg (192 lb)	3 April 1955	25 years, 117 days	Total	58	
Coach	Boris Popov		1.81 m (5 ft 11 in)		21 March 1941	39 years, 130 days			2019

Sources:

- Official Reports (PDF): 1980 (pp. 497, 500, 501, 502);
- Olympedia: 1980 (men's tournament);
- Sports Reference: 1980 (men's tournament);
- ISHOF.

=== 1976 (Hungary, 6th title) ===
* Edition of men's tournament: 17th

- Host city: Montreal, Canada
- Number of participating teams: 12
- Competition format: Round-robin pools advanced teams to the round-robin final pool
- Champion: Hungary (6th title; 1st place in preliminary C group; 1st place in final E group)

Match	Round	Date	Opponent	Result	Goals for	Goals against	Goal diff.
Match 1/8	Preliminary round – Group C	18 July 1976	Australia	Won	7	6	1
Match 2/8	Preliminary round – Group C	19 July 1976	Canada	Won	4	2	2
Match 3/8	Preliminary round – Group C	20 July 1976	West Germany	Won	4	0	4
Match 4/8	Final round – Group E	22 July 1976	Italy	Won	6	5	1
Match 5/8	Final round – Group E	23 July 1976	West Germany	Won	5	3	2
Match 6/8	Final round – Group E	24 July 1976	Netherlands	Won	5	3	2
Match 7/8	Final round – Group E	26 July 1976	Romania	Won	9	8	1
Match 8/8	Final round – Group E	27 July 1976	Yugoslavia	Drawn	5	5	0
Total	Matches played: 8 • Wins: 7 • Ties: 1 • Defeats: 0 • Win %: 87.5%				45	32	13

Source: Official Reports (PDF): 1976 (pp. 487, 489, 491, 492).

- Head coach: (Hungary) Dezső Gyarmati (1st title as head coach)

Roster
Cap No.	Player	Pos	Height	Weight	Date of birth	Age of winning gold	Oly debut	Goals	ISHOF member
1	Endre Molnár	GK	1.85 m (6 ft 1 in)	92 kg (203 lb)	23 July 1945	31 years, 4 days	No	0	
2	István Szívós Jr.	FP	2.02 m (6 ft 8 in)	106 kg (234 lb)	24 April 1948	28 years, 94 days	No	4	1996
3	Tamás Faragó	FP	1.94 m (6 ft 4 in)	95 kg (209 lb)	5 August 1952	23 years, 357 days	No	22	1993
4	László Sárosi	FP	1.83 m (6 ft 0 in)	83 kg (183 lb)	12 October 1946	29 years, 289 days	No	3	
5	György Horkai	FP	1.78 m (5 ft 10 in)	74 kg (163 lb)	1 July 1954	22 years, 26 days	Yes	10	
6	Gábor Csapó	FP	1.98 m (6 ft 6 in)	103 kg (227 lb)	20 September 1950	25 years, 311 days	Yes	4	
7	Attila Sudár	FP	1.87 m (6 ft 2 in)	81 kg (179 lb)	11 April 1954	22 years, 107 days	Yes	0	
8	György Kenéz	FP	1.80 m (5 ft 11 in)	78 kg (172 lb)	23 June 1956	20 years, 34 days	Yes	0	
9	György Gerendás	FP	1.86 m (6 ft 1 in)	80 kg (176 lb)	23 February 1954	22 years, 155 days	Yes	1	
10	Ferenc Konrád	FP	1.83 m (6 ft 0 in)	88 kg (194 lb)	17 April 1945	31 years, 101 days	No	1	
11	Tibor Cservenyák	GK	1.85 m (6 ft 1 in)	91 kg (201 lb)	8 August 1948	27 years, 354 days	No	0	
Average			1.87 m (6 ft 2 in)	88 kg (194 lb)	29 August 1950	25 years, 333 days	Total	45	
Coach	Dezső Gyarmati		1.86 m (6 ft 1 in)		23 October 1927	48 years, 278 days			1976

Sources:

- Official Reports (PDF): 1976 (pp. 487, 489, 491, 492);
- Olympedia: 1976 (men's tournament);
- Sports Reference: 1976 (men's tournament);
- ISHOF.

=== 1972 (Soviet Union, 1st title) ===
* Edition of men's tournament: 16th

- Host city: Munich, West Germany
- Number of participating teams: 16
- Competition format: Round-robin pools advanced teams to the round-robin final pool
- Champion: Soviet Union (1st title; 1st place in preliminary C group; 1st place in final I group)

Match	Round	Date	Opponent	Result	Goals for	Goals against	Goal diff.
Match 1/8	Preliminary round – Group C	27 August 1972	Italy	Won	4	1	3
Match 2/8	Preliminary round – Group C	28 August 1972	Japan	Won	11	1	10
Match 3/8	Preliminary round – Group C	29 August 1972	Bulgaria	Won	7	2	5
Match 4/8	Preliminary round – Group C	30 August 1972	Spain	Won	8	5	3
Match 5/8	Final round – Group I	1 September 1972	Yugoslavia	Won	5	4	1
Match 6/8	Final round – Group I	2 September 1972	West Germany	Won	4	2	2
Match 7/8	Final round – Group I	3 September 1972	United States	Drawn	6	6	0
Match 8/8	Final round – Group I	4 September 1972	Hungary	Drawn	3	3	0
Total	Matches played: 8 • Wins: 6 • Ties: 2 • Defeats: 0 • Win %: 75.0%				48	24	24

Source: Official Reports (PDF): 1972 (pp. 358, 359, 363, 364, 365).

- Head coach: (Soviet Union) Vladimir Semyonov (1st title as head coach)

Roster
Cap No.	Player	Pos	Height	Weight	Date of birth	Age of winning gold	Oly debut	Goals	ISHOF member
1	Vadim Gulyayev	GK	1.83 m (6 ft 0 in)	90 kg (198 lb)	5 February 1941	31 years, 212 days	No	0	
2	Anatoly Akimov	FP	1.81 m (5 ft 11 in)	84 kg (185 lb)	15 November 1947	24 years, 294 days	Yes	10	
3	Aleksandr Dreval	FP	1.90 m (6 ft 3 in)	89 kg (196 lb)	17 July 1944	28 years, 49 days	Yes	11	
4	Aleksandr Dolgushin	FP	1.87 m (6 ft 2 in)	99 kg (218 lb)	7 March 1946	26 years, 181 days	No	2	2010
5	Vladimir Zhmudsky	FP	1.80 m (5 ft 11 in)	81 kg (179 lb)	23 January 1947	25 years, 225 days	Yes	2	
6	Aleksandr Kabanov	FP	1.81 m (5 ft 11 in)	84 kg (185 lb)	11 June 1948	24 years, 85 days	Yes	1	2001
7	Aleksei Barkalov	FP	1.80 m (5 ft 11 in)	82 kg (181 lb)	18 February 1946	26 years, 199 days	No	10	1993
8	Aleksandr Shidlovsky	FP	1.80 m (5 ft 11 in)	82 kg (181 lb)	1 February 1941	31 years, 216 days	No	4	
9	Nikolay Melnikov	FP	1.84 m (6 ft 0 in)	86 kg (190 lb)	24 January 1948	24 years, 224 days	Yes	1	
10	Leonid Osipov	FP	1.87 m (6 ft 2 in)	90 kg (198 lb)	6 February 1943	29 years, 211 days	No	7	
11	Viacheslav Sobchenko	GK	1.87 m (6 ft 2 in)	86 kg (190 lb)	18 April 1949	23 years, 139 days	Yes	0	
Average			1.84 m (6 ft 0 in)	87 kg (192 lb)	19 September 1945	26 years, 351 days	Total	48	
Coach	Vladimir Semyonov		1.84 m (6 ft 0 in)		10 May 1938	34 years, 117 days			

Sources:

- Official Reports (PDF): 1972 (pp. 358, 359, 363, 364, 365);
- Olympedia: 1972 (men's tournament);
- Sports Reference: 1972 (men's tournament);
- ISHOF.

=== 1968 (Yugoslavia, 1st title) ===
* Edition of men's tournament: 15th

- Host city: Mexico City, Mexico
- Number of participating teams: 15
- Competition format: Round-robin pools advanced teams to classification matches
- Champion: Yugoslavia (1st title; 2nd place in preliminary B group)

Match	Round	Date	Opponent	Result	Goals for	Goals against	Goal diff.
Match 1/9	Preliminary round – Group B	14 October 1968	Egypt	Won	13	2	11
Match 2/9	Preliminary round – Group B	16 October 1968	East Germany	Drawn	4	4	0
Match 3/9	Preliminary round – Group B	17 October 1968	Mexico	Won	9	0	9
Match 4/9	Preliminary round – Group B	19 October 1968	Netherlands	Won	7	4	3
Match 5/9	Preliminary round – Group B	20 October 1968	Italy	Lost	4	5	–1
Match 6/9	Preliminary round – Group B	21 October 1968	Greece	Won	11	1	10
Match 7/9	Preliminary round – Group B	22 October 1968	Japan	Won	17	2	15
Match 8/9	Semi-finals	24 October 1968	Hungary	Won	8	6	2
Match 9/9	Gold medal match	26 October 1968	Soviet Union	Won	13	11	2
Total	Matches played: 9 • Wins: 7 • Ties: 1 • Defeats: 1 • Win %: 77.8%				86	35	51

Source: Official Reports (PDF): 1968 (pp. 812, 814, 816, 817, 819, 822, 824, 826).

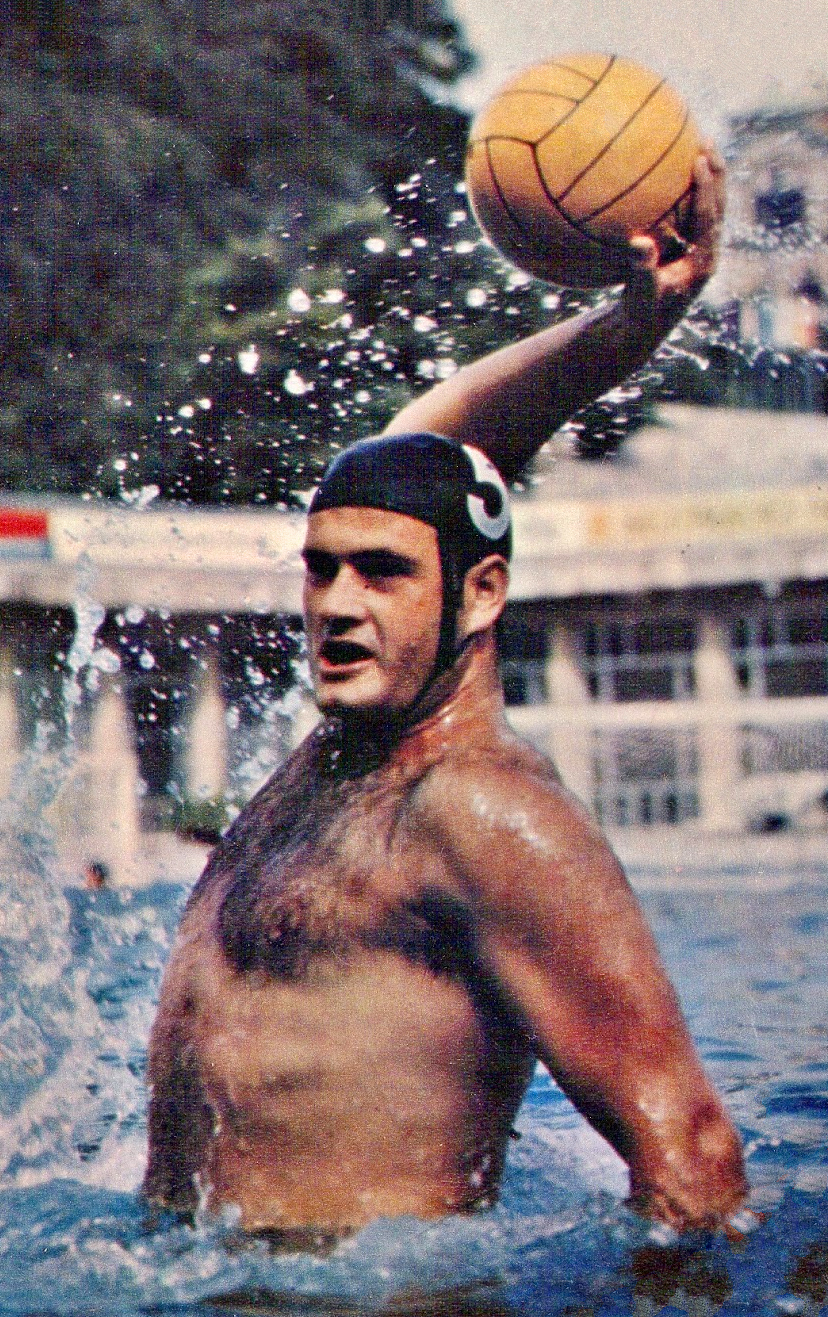
Mirko Sandić scored 17 goals at the 1968 Olympics, helping Yugoslavia win gold.

- Head coach: (Socialist Federal Republic of Yugoslavia) Aleksandar Sajfert (1st title as head coach)

Roster
Cap No.	Player	Pos	Height	Weight	Date of birth	Age of winning gold	Oly debut	Goals	ISHOF member
1	Karlo Stipanić	GK	1.83 m (6 ft 0 in)	85 kg (187 lb)	8 December 1941	26 years, 323 days	No	0	
2	Ivo Trumbić	FP	1.97 m (6 ft 6 in)	103 kg (227 lb)	2 April 1935	33 years, 207 days	No	8	2015
3	Ozren Bonačić	FP	1.96 m (6 ft 5 in)	110 kg (243 lb)	5 January 1942	26 years, 295 days	No	6	
4	Uroš Marović	FP	1.96 m (6 ft 5 in)	94 kg (207 lb)	4 July 1946	22 years, 114 days	Yes	11	
5	Ronald Lopatni	FP	1.88 m (6 ft 2 in)	91 kg (201 lb)	19 September 1944	24 years, 37 days	Yes	3	
6	Zoran Janković	FP	1.78 m (5 ft 10 in)	95 kg (209 lb)	8 January 1940	28 years, 292 days	No	21	2004
7	Miroslav Poljak	FP	1.85 m (6 ft 1 in)	95 kg (209 lb)	3 September 1944	24 years, 53 days	Yes	13	
8	Dejan Dabović	FP	1.90 m (6 ft 3 in)	95 kg (209 lb)	3 August 1944	24 years, 84 days	Yes	1	
9	Đorđe Perišić	FP	1.91 m (6 ft 3 in)	80 kg (176 lb)	6 May 1941	27 years, 173 days	Yes	6	
10	Mirko Sandić	FP	1.98 m (6 ft 6 in)	100 kg (220 lb)	9 May 1942	26 years, 170 days	No	17	1999
11	Zdravko Hebel	GK	1.87 m (6 ft 2 in)	87 kg (192 lb)	21 January 1943	25 years, 279 days	Yes	0	
Average			1.90 m (6 ft 3 in)	94 kg (207 lb)	28 May 1942	26 years, 151 days	Total	86	
Coach	Aleksandar Sajfert								

Sources:

- Official Reports (PDF): 1968 (pp. 812, 814, 816, 817, 819, 822, 824, 826);
- Olympedia: 1968 (men's tournament);
- Sports Reference: 1968 (men's tournament);
- ISHOF.

=== 1964 (Hungary, 5th title) ===
* Edition of men's tournament: 14th

- Host city: Tokyo, Japan
- Number of participating teams: 13
- Competition format: Round-robin pools advanced teams to the round-robin semi-final pool; round-robin semi-final pools advanced teams to the round-robin final pool
- Champion: Hungary (5th title; 1st place in preliminary D group; 2nd place in semi-final B group; 1st place in final group)

Match	Round	Date	Opponent	Result	Goals for	Goals against	Goal diff.
Match 1/6	Preliminary round – Group D	11 October 1964	Egypt	Won	11	1	10
Match 2/6	Preliminary round – Group D	12 October 1964	Belgium	Won	5	0	5
Match 3/6	Semi-final round – Group B	14 October 1964	Netherlands	Won	6	5	1
Match 4/6	Semi-final round – Group B	15 October 1964	Yugoslavia	Drawn	4	4	0
Match 5/6	Final round – Group	17 October 1964	Italy	Won	3	1	2
Match 6/6	Final round – Group	18 October 1964	Soviet Union	Won	5	2	3
Total	Matches played: 6 • Wins: 5 • Ties: 1 • Defeats: 0 • Win %: 83.3%				34	13	21

Source: Official Reports (PDF): 1964 (pp. 685, 687, 691, 694, 695, 698).

- Head coach: (Hungary) Károly Laky (1st title as head coach)

Roster
#	Player	Pos	Height	Weight	Date of birth	Age of winning gold	Oly debut	Goals	ISHOF member
P1	Miklós Ambrus	GK	1.85 m (6 ft 1 in)	90 kg (198 lb)	31 May 1933	31 years, 140 days	Yes	0	
P2	András Bodnár	FP	1.80 m (5 ft 11 in)	78 kg (172 lb)	9 April 1942	22 years, 192 days	No	2	2017
P3	Ottó Boros	GK	1.86 m (6 ft 1 in)	95 kg (209 lb)	5 August 1929	35 years, 74 days	No	0	
P4	Zoltán Dömötör	FP	1.86 m (6 ft 1 in)	84 kg (185 lb)	21 August 1935	29 years, 58 days	No	7	
P5	László Felkai	FP	1.80 m (5 ft 11 in)	76 kg (168 lb)	1 March 1941	23 years, 231 days	No	6	
P6	Dezső Gyarmati (C)	FP	1.86 m (6 ft 1 in)	83 kg (183 lb)	23 October 1927	36 years, 361 days	No	2	1976
P7	Tivadar Kanizsa	FP	1.80 m (5 ft 11 in)	78 kg (172 lb)	4 April 1933	31 years, 197 days	No	1	
P8	György Kárpáti	FP	1.67 m (5 ft 6 in)	71 kg (157 lb)	23 June 1935	29 years, 117 days	No	4	1982
P9	János Konrád	FP	1.83 m (6 ft 0 in)	83 kg (183 lb)	27 August 1941	23 years, 52 days	No	2	
P10	Mihály Mayer	FP	1.85 m (6 ft 1 in)	81 kg (179 lb)	27 December 1933	30 years, 296 days	No	0	1987
P11	Dénes Pócsik	FP	1.95 m (6 ft 5 in)	93 kg (205 lb)	9 March 1940	24 years, 223 days	Yes	2	
P12	Péter Rusorán	FP	1.70 m (5 ft 7 in)	69 kg (152 lb)	11 April 1940	24 years, 190 days	No	8	
Average			1.82 m (6 ft 0 in)	82 kg (181 lb)	24 March 1936	28 years, 208 days	Total	34	
Coach	Károly Laky								

Sources:

- Official Reports (PDF): 1964 (pp. 685, 687, 691, 694, 695, 698);
- Olympedia: 1964 (men's tournament);
- Sports Reference: 1964 (men's tournament);
- ISHOF.

=== 1960 (Italy, 2nd title) ===
* Edition of men's tournament: 13th

- Host city: Rome, Italy
- Number of participating teams: 16
- Competition format: Round-robin pools advanced teams to the round-robin semi-final pool; round-robin semi-final pools advanced teams to the round-robin final pool
- Champion: Italy (2nd title; 1st place in preliminary A group; 1st place in semi-final A group; 1st place in final group)

Match	Round	Date	Opponent	Result	Goals for	Goals against	Goal diff.
Match 1/7	Preliminary round – Group A	25 August 1960	Romania	Won	4	3	1
Match 2/7	Preliminary round – Group A	26 August 1960	Japan	Won	8	1	7
Match 3/7	Preliminary round – Group A	27 August 1960	Egypt	Won	9	4	5
Match 4/7	Semi-final round – Group A	30 August 1960	United Team of Germany	Won	3	0	3
Match 5/7	Semi-final round – Group A	31 August 1960	Soviet Union	Won	2	0	2
Match 6/7	Final round – Group	2 September 1960	Yugoslavia	Won	2	1	1
Match 7/7	Final round – Group	3 September 1960	Hungary	Drawn	3	3	0
Total	Matches played: 7 • Wins: 6 • Ties: 1 • Defeats: 0 • Win %: 85.7%				31	12	19

Source: Official Reports (PDF): 1960 (pp. 618, 619, 627, 628, 631).

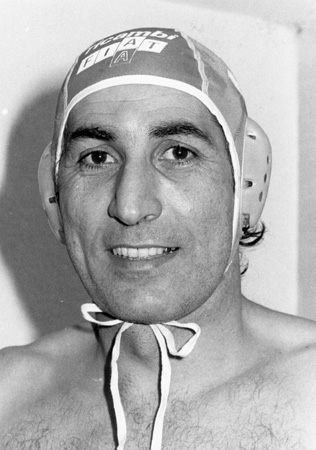
Eraldo Pizzo scored 7 goals at the 1960 Olympics, helping Italy win gold.

- Head coach: (Hungary) Andres Zolyomy (1st title as head coach)

Roster
#	Player	Pos	Height	Weight	Date of birth	Age of winning gold	Oly debut	Goals	ISHOF member
P1	Amedeo Ambron	FP	1.74 m (5 ft 9 in)	77 kg (170 lb)	23 January 1939	21 years, 224 days	Yes	1	
P2	Danio Bardi	FP	1.80 m (5 ft 11 in)	76 kg (168 lb)	23 May 1937	23 years, 103 days	Yes	2	
P3	Giuseppe D'Altrui	FP	1.85 m (6 ft 1 in)	82 kg (181 lb)	7 April 1934	26 years, 149 days	No	1	2010
P4	Salvatore Gionta	FP	1.82 m (6 ft 0 in)	81 kg (179 lb)	22 December 1930	29 years, 256 days	No	2	
P5	Giancarlo Guerrini	FP	1.81 m (5 ft 11 in)	72 kg (159 lb)	29 December 1939	20 years, 249 days	Yes	3	
P6	Franco Lavoratori	FP	1.80 m (5 ft 11 in)	78 kg (172 lb)	15 March 1941	19 years, 172 days	Yes	4	
P7	Gianni Lonzi	FP	1.82 m (6 ft 0 in)	74 kg (163 lb)	4 August 1938	22 years, 30 days	Yes	0	2009
P8	Luigi Mannelli	FP	1.85 m (6 ft 1 in)	96 kg (212 lb)	21 February 1939	21 years, 195 days	No	4	
P9	Rosario Parmegiani	FP	1.74 m (5 ft 9 in)	77 kg (170 lb)	12 March 1937	23 years, 175 days	Yes	7	
P10	Eraldo Pizzo	FP	1.87 m (6 ft 2 in)	84 kg (185 lb)	21 April 1938	22 years, 135 days	Yes	7	1990
P11	Dante Rossi	GK	1.91 m (6 ft 3 in)	89 kg (196 lb)	28 August 1936	24 years, 6 days	Yes	0	
P12	Brunello Spinelli	GK	1.82 m (6 ft 0 in)	82 kg (181 lb)	26 May 1939	21 years, 100 days	Yes	0	
Average			1.82 m (6 ft 0 in)	81 kg (179 lb)	6 September 1937	22 years, 363 days	Total	31	
Coach	Andres Zolyomy								2010

Sources:

- Official Reports (PDF): 1960 (pp. 618, 619, 627, 628, 631);
- Olympedia: 1960 (men's tournament);
- Sports Reference: 1960 (men's tournament);
- ISHOF.

=== 1956 (Hungary, 4th title) ===
* Edition of men's tournament: 12th

- Host city: Melbourne, Australia
- Number of participating teams: 10
- Competition format: Round-robin pools advanced teams to the round-robin final pool
- Champion: Hungary (4th title; 1st place in preliminary B group; 1st place in final group)

Match	Round	Date	Opponent	Result	Goals for	Goals against	Goal diff.	Note
Match 1/6	Preliminary round – Group B	29 November 1956	Great Britain	Won	6	1	5	
Match 2/6	Preliminary round – Group B	30 November 1956	United States	Won	6	2	4	
Match 3/6	Final round – Group	3 December 1956	Italy	Won	4	0	4	
Match 4/6	Final round – Group	5 December 1956	United Team of Germany	Won	4	0	4	
Match 5/6	Final round – Group	6 December 1956	Soviet Union	Won	4	0	4	Blood in the Water match
Match 6/6	Final round – Group	7 December 1956	Yugoslavia	Won	2	1	0	
Total	Matches played: 6 • Wins: 6 • Ties: 0 • Defeats: 0 • Win %: 100%				26	4	22	Note

Source: Official Reports (PDF): 1956 (pp. 625, 626).

- Head coach: (Hungary) Béla Rajki (2nd title as head coach)

Roster
#	Player	Pos	Height	Weight	Date of birth	Age of winning gold	Oly debut	ISHOF member
P1	Antal Bolvári	FP			6 May 1932	24 years, 215 days	No	
P2	Ottó Boros	GK	1.86 m (6 ft 1 in)	95 kg (209 lb)	5 August 1929	27 years, 124 days	Yes	
P3	Dezső Gyarmati (C)	FP	1.86 m (6 ft 1 in)	83 kg (183 lb)	23 October 1927	29 years, 45 days	No	1976
P4	István Hevesi	FP	1.85 m (6 ft 1 in)	86 kg (190 lb)	2 April 1931	25 years, 249 days	Yes	
P5	László Jeney	GK	1.81 m (5 ft 11 in)	77 kg (170 lb)	30 May 1923	33 years, 191 days	No	
P6	Tivadar Kanizsa	FP	1.80 m (5 ft 11 in)	78 kg (172 lb)	4 April 1933	23 years, 247 days	Yes	
P7	György Kárpáti	FP	1.67 m (5 ft 6 in)	71 kg (157 lb)	23 June 1935	21 years, 167 days	No	1982
P8	Kálmán Markovits	FP	1.78 m (5 ft 10 in)	71 kg (157 lb)	26 August 1931	25 years, 103 days	No	1994
P9	Miklós Martin	FP			29 June 1931	25 years, 161 days	No	
P10	Mihály Mayer	FP	1.85 m (6 ft 1 in)	81 kg (179 lb)	27 December 1933	22 years, 346 days	Yes	1987
P11	István Szívós Sr.	FP	1.85 m (6 ft 1 in)		20 August 1920	36 years, 109 days	No	1997
P12	Ervin Zádor	FP			7 June 1935	21 years, 183 days	Yes	
Average			1.81 m (5 ft 11 in)	80 kg (176 lb)	12 July 1930	26 years, 148 days		
Coach	Béla Rajki				2 February 1909	47 years, 309 days		1996

Sources:

- Official Reports (PDF): 1956 (pp. 625, 626);
- Olympedia: 1956 (men's tournament);
- Sports Reference: 1956 (men's tournament);
- ISHOF.

=== 1952 (Hungary, 3rd title) ===
* Edition of men's tournament: 11th

- Host city: Helsinki, Finland
- Number of participating teams: 21
- Competition format: Single-elimination tournament qualifying; round-robin pools advanced teams to the round-robin semi-final pool; round-robin semi-final pools advanced teams to the round-robin final pool
- Champion: Hungary (3rd title; 1st place in preliminary B group; 1st place in semi-final F group; 1st place in final group)

Match	Round	Date	Opponent	Result	Goals for	Goals against	Goal diff.
Match 1/8	Eliminating round – First round	25 July 1952	Mexico	Won	13	4	9
Match 2/8	Preliminary round – Group B	26 July 1952	Egypt	Won	9	0	9
Match 3/8	Preliminary round – Group B	27 July 1952	Soviet Union	Won	5	3	2
Match 4/8	Preliminary round – Group B	28 July 1952	Germany	Won	9	1	8
Match 5/8	Semi-final round – Group F	30 July 1952	Netherlands	Drawn	4	4	0
Match 6/8	Semi-final round – Group F	31 July 1952	Yugoslavia	Drawn	2	2	0
Match 7/8	Final round – Group	1 August 1952	Italy	Won	7	2	5
Match 8/8	Final round – Group	2 August 1952	United States	Won	4	0	4
Total	Matches played: 8 • Wins: 6 • Ties: 2 • Defeats: 0 • Win %: 75.0%				53	16	37

Source: Official Reports (PDF): 1952 (pp. 602, 603, 606, 607, 608).

- Head coach: (Hungary) Béla Rajki (1st title as head coach)

Roster
#	Player	Pos	Height	Weight	Date of birth	Age of winning gold	Oly debut	ISHOF member
P1	Róbert Antal	GK			21 July 1921	31 years, 12 days	Yes	
P2	Antal Bolvári	FP			6 May 1932	20 years, 88 days	Yes	
P3	Dezső Fábián	FP			17 December 1918	33 years, 229 days	No	
P4	Dezső Gyarmati	FP	1.86 m (6 ft 1 in)	83 kg (183 lb)	23 October 1927	24 years, 284 days	No	1976
P5	István Hasznos	FP			8 December 1924	27 years, 238 days	Yes	
P6	László Jeney	GK	1.81 m (5 ft 11 in)	77 kg (170 lb)	30 May 1923	29 years, 64 days	No	
P7	György Kárpáti	FP	1.67 m (5 ft 6 in)	71 kg (157 lb)	23 June 1935	17 years, 40 days	Yes	1982
P8	Dezső Lemhényi	FP		71 kg (157 lb)	9 December 1917	34 years, 237 days	No	1998
P9	Kálmán Markovits	FP	1.78 m (5 ft 10 in)	71 kg (157 lb)	26 August 1931	20 years, 342 days	Yes	1994
P10	Miklós Martin	FP			29 June 1931	21 years, 34 days	Yes	
P11	Károly Szittya	FP			18 June 1918	34 years, 45 days	No	
P12	István Szívós Sr.	FP	1.85 m (6 ft 1 in)		20 August 1920	31 years, 348 days	No	1997
P13	György Vizvári	FP			18 December 1928	23 years, 228 days	Yes	
Average					31 August 1925	26 years, 337 days		
Coach	Béla Rajki				2 February 1909	43 years, 182 days		1996

Sources:

- Official Reports (PDF): 1952 (pp. 602, 603, 606, 607, 608);
- Olympedia: 1952 (men's tournament);
- Sports Reference: 1952 (men's tournament);
- ISHOF.

=== 1948 (Italy, 1st title) ===
* Edition of men's tournament: 10th

- Host city: London, United Kingdom
- Number of participating teams: 18
- Competition format: Series of round-robin elimination pools, followed by round-robin semi-final pools, and then round-robin final pools
- Champion: Italy (1st title; 1st place in round one D group; 1st place in round two I group; 1st place in semi-final L group; 1st place in final group)

Match	Round	Date	Opponent	Result	Goals for	Goals against	Goal diff.	Note
Match 1/7	Round one – Group D	30 July 1948	Australia	Won	9	0	9	
Match 2/7	Round one – Group D	30 July 1948	Yugoslavia	~~Won~~	~~4~~	~~2~~	~~2~~	The match result was annulled and ordered to be replayed.
Replay 2/7	Round one – Group D	1 August 1948	Yugoslavia	Drawn	4	4	0	Replay of Match 2/7
Match 3/7	Round two – Group I	2 August 1948	Hungary	Won	4	3	1	
Match 4/7	Semi-final round – Group L	4 August 1948	Egypt	Won	5	1	4	
Match 5/7	Semi-final round – Group L	5 August 1948	France	Won	5	2	3	
Match 6/7	Final round – Group	6 August 1948	Belgium	Won	4	2	2	
Match 7/7	Final round – Group	7 August 1948	Netherlands	Won	4	2	2	
Total	Matches played: 7 • Wins: 6 • Ties: 1 • Defeats: 0 • Win %: 85.7%				35	14	21	Note

Source: Official Reports (PDF): 1948 (pp. 643, 645, 646).

- Head coach: (Italy) Giuseppe Valle (1st title as head coach)

Roster
#	Player	Pos	Height	Weight	Date of birth	Age of winning gold	Oly debut	ISHOF member
P1	Gildo Arena	FP			25 February 1921	27 years, 164 days	Yes	
P2	Emilio Bulgarelli	FP			15 February 1917	31 years, 174 days	Yes	
P3	Pasquale Buonocore	GK			17 May 1916	32 years, 82 days	Yes	
P4	Aldo Ghira	FP			4 April 1920	28 years, 125 days	Yes	
P5	Mario Majoni	FP			27 May 1910	38 years, 72 days	Yes	1972
P6	Geminio Ognio	FP			13 December 1917	30 years, 238 days	Yes	
P7	Gianfranco Pandolfini	FP			16 September 1920	27 years, 326 days	Yes	
P8	Tullio Pandolfini	FP			6 August 1914	34 years, 1 day	Yes	
P9	Cesare Rubini	FP			2 November 1923	24 years, 279 days	Yes	2000
Average					17 January 1918	30 years, 203 days		
Coach	Giuseppe Valle				15 March 1904	44 years, 145 days		

Note: Gianfranco Pandolfini and Tullio Pandolfini are brothers.
Sources:

- Official Reports (PDF): 1948 (pp. 643, 645, 646);
- Olympedia: 1948 (men's tournament);
- Sports Reference: 1948 (men's tournament);
- ISHOF.

=== 1936 (Hungary, 2nd title) ===
* Edition of men's tournament: 9th

- Host city: Berlin, Germany
- Number of participating teams: 16
- Competition format: Round-robin pools advanced teams to the round-robin semi-final pool; round-robin semi-final pools advanced teams to the round-robin final pool
- Champion: Hungary (2nd title; 1st place in preliminary II group; 1st place in semi-final I group; 1st place in final group)

Match	Round	Date	Opponent	Result	Goals for	Goals against	Goal diff.
Match 1/7	Preliminary round – Group II	8 August 1936	Yugoslavia	Won	4	1	3
Match 2/7	Preliminary round – Group II	9 August 1936	Malta	Won	12	0	12
Match 3/7	Preliminary round – Group II	10 August 1936	Great Britain	Won	10	1	9
Match 4/7	Semi-final round – Group I	11 August 1936	Belgium	Won	3	0	3
Match 5/7	Semi-final round – Group I	12 August 1936	Netherlands	Won	8	0	8
Match 6/7	Final round – Group	14 August 1936	Germany	Drawn	2	2	0
Match 7/7	Final round – Group	15 August 1936	France	Won	5	0	5
Total	Matches played: 7 • Wins: 6 • Ties: 1 • Defeats: 0 • Win %: 85.7%				44	4	40

Source: Official Reports (PDF): 1936 (pp. 347, 349, 355).

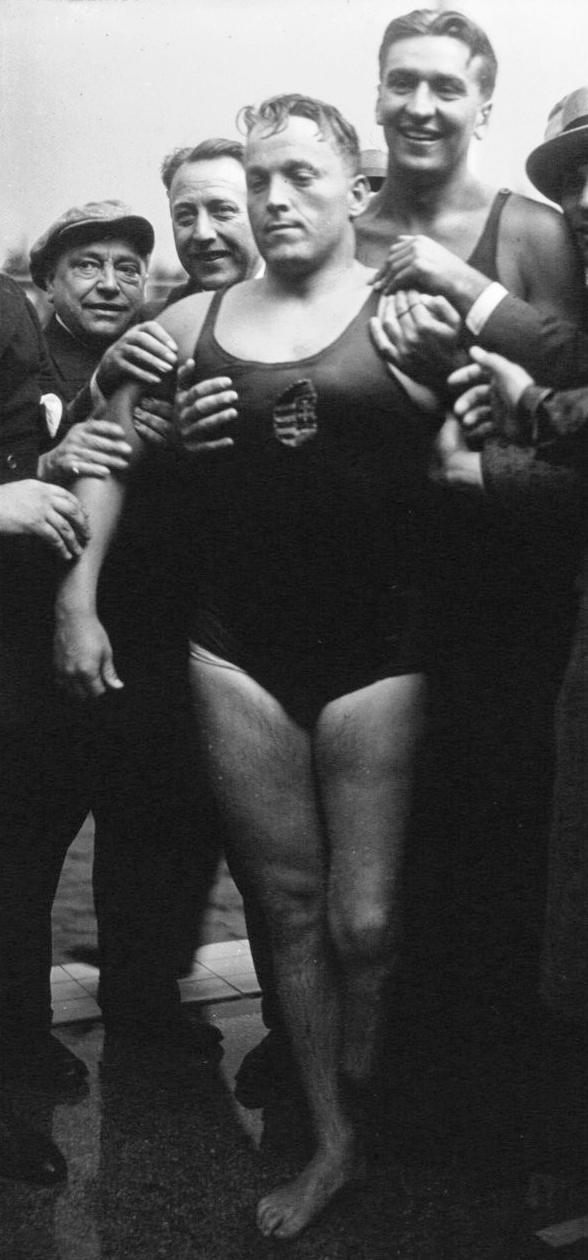
Despite his disability of losing the left leg below the knee, Olivér Halassy won three consecutive Olympic medals (two gold and one silver) in water polo between 1928 and 1936.

- Head coach: (Hungary)

Roster
#	Player	Pos	Height	Weight	Date of birth	Age of winning gold	Oly debut	ISHOF member
P1	Mihály Bozsi	FP			2 March 1911	25 years, 166 days	Yes	
P2	Jenő Brandi	FP			23 May 1913	23 years, 84 days	Yes	
P3	György Bródy	GK	1.85 m (6 ft 1 in)		21 July 1908	28 years, 25 days	No	
P4	Olivér Halassy	FP			31 July 1909	27 years, 15 days	No	1978
P5	Kálmán Hazai	FP			17 July 1913	23 years, 29 days	Yes	
P6	Márton Homonnai	FP			5 February 1906	30 years, 192 days	No	1971
P7	György Kutasi	GK			16 September 1910	25 years, 334 days	Yes	
P8	István Molnár	FP			5 January 1913	23 years, 223 days	Yes	
P9	János Németh	FP			12 June 1906	30 years, 64 days	No	1969
P10	Miklós Sárkány	FP			15 August 1908	28 years, 0 days	No	
P11	Sándor Tarics	FP			23 September 1913	22 years, 327 days	Yes	
Average					10 June 1910	26 years, 66 days		

Sources:

- Official Reports (PDF): 1936 (pp. 347, 349, 355);
- Olympedia: 1936 (men's tournament);
- Sports Reference: 1936 (men's tournament);
- ISHOF.

=== 1932 (Hungary, 1st title) ===
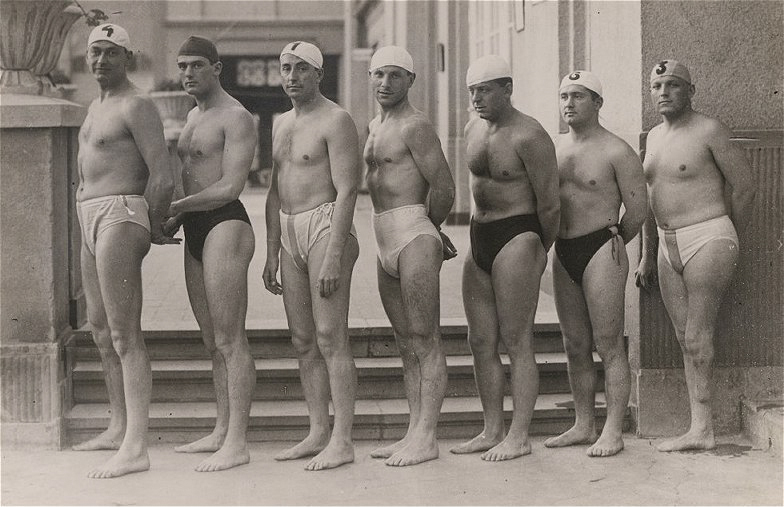
The 1932 Hungary men's Olympic water polo team. From left to right: Sándor Ivády, György Bródy, József Vértesy, János Németh, Márton Homonnai, Alajos Keserű, and Olivér Halassy.

- Edition of men's tournament: 8th
- Host city: Los Angeles, United States
- Number of participating teams: 5
- Competition format: Round-robin tournament
- Champion: Hungary (1st title)

Match	Round	Date	Opponent	Result	Goals for	Goals against	Goal diff.
Match 1/4	Round-robin group	6 August 1932	Germany	Won	6	2	4
Match 2/4	Round-robin group	8 August 1932	Japan	Won	17	0	17
Match 3/4	Round-robin group	11 August 1932	United States	Won	7	0	7
Match 4/4	Round-robin group	Scheduled	Brazil	Brazil was disqualified.			
Total	Matches played: 3 • Wins: 3 • Ties: 0 • Defeats: 0 • Win %: 100%				30	2	28

Source: Official Reports (PDF): 1932 (pp. 646, 649, 650).

- Head coach: (Hungary)

Roster
#	Player	Pos	Height	Weight	Date of birth	Age of winning gold	Oly debut	ISHOF member
P1	István Barta	GK			13 August 1895	37 years, 0 days	No	
P2	György Bródy	GK	1.85 m (6 ft 1 in)		21 July 1908	24 years, 23 days	Yes	
P3	Olivér Halassy	FP			31 July 1909	23 years, 13 days	No	1978
P4	Márton Homonnai	FP			5 February 1906	26 years, 190 days	No	1971
P5	Sándor Ivády	FP			1 May 1903	29 years, 104 days	No	
P6	Alajos Keserű	FP			8 March 1905	27 years, 158 days	No	
P7	Ferenc Keserű	FP			27 August 1903	28 years, 352 days	No	
P8	János Németh	FP			12 June 1906	26 years, 62 days	Yes	1969
P9	Miklós Sárkány	FP			15 August 1908	23 years, 364 days	Yes	
P10	József Vértesy	FP			19 February 1901	31 years, 176 days	No	
Average					27 October 1904	27 years, 291 days		

Note: Alajos Keserű and Ferenc Keserű are brothers.
Sources:

- Official Reports (PDF): 1932 (pp. 646, 649, 650);
- Olympedia: 1932 (men's tournament);
- Sports Reference: 1932 (men's tournament);
- ISHOF.

=== 1928 (Germany, 1st title) ===
* Edition of men's tournament: 7th

- Host city: Amsterdam, Netherlands
- Number of participating teams: 14
- Competition format: Single-elimination tournament; Bergvall system for third-place
- Champion: Germany (1st title)

Match	Round	Date	Opponent	Result	Goals for	Goals against	Goal diff.
Match 1/3	Quarter-finals	6 August 1928	Belgium	Won	5	3	2
Match 2/3	Semi-finals	7 August 1928	Great Britain	Won	8	5	3
Match 3/3	Gold medal match	10 August 1928	Hungary	Won	5	2	3
Total	Matches played: 3 • Wins: 3 • Ties: 0 • Defeats: 0 • Win %: 100%				18	10	8

Source: Official Reports (PDF): 1928 (pp. 803, 804, 806).

- Head coach: (Germany)

Roster
#	Player	Pos	Height	Weight	Date of birth	Age of winning gold	Oly debut	ISHOF member
P1	Max Amann	FP			19 January 1905	23 years, 205 days	Yes	
P2	Karl Bähre	FP			11 April 1899	29 years, 122 days	Yes	
P3	Emil Benecke	FP	1.73 m (5 ft 8 in)		4 October 1898	29 years, 312 days	Yes	
P4	Johann Blank	GK			17 April 1904	24 years, 116 days	Yes	
P5	Otto Cordes	FP			31 August 1905	22 years, 346 days	Yes	
P6	Fritz Gunst	FP			22 September 1908	19 years, 324 days	Yes	1990
P7	Erich Rademacher	GK			9 June 1901	27 years, 63 days	Yes	1972
P8	Joachim Rademacher	FP			20 June 1906	22 years, 52 days	Yes	
Average					17 September 1903	24 years, 329 days		

Note: Erich Rademacher and Joachim Rademacher are brothers.
Sources:

- Official Reports (PDF): 1928 (pp. 803, 804, 806);
- Olympedia: 1928 (men's tournament);
- Sports Reference: 1928 (men's tournament);
- ISHOF.

=== 1924 (France, 1st title) ===
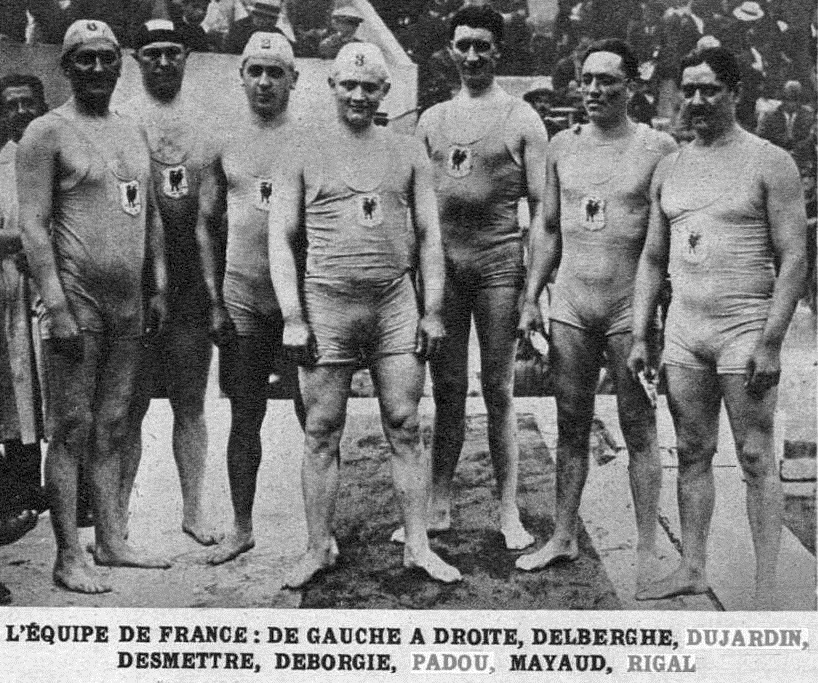
The 1924 France men's Olympic water polo team. From left to right: Noël Delberghe, Paul Dujardin, Robert Desmettre, Albert Deborgies, Henri Padou, Albert Mayaud, and Georges Rigal.

- Edition of men's tournament: 6th
- Host city: Paris, France
- Number of participating teams: 13
- Competition format: Single-elimination tournament; Bergvall system for second- and third-place
- Champion: France (1st title)

Match	Round	Date	Opponent	Result	Goals for	Goals against	Goal diff.
Match 1/4	Round one	13 July 1924	United States	Won	3	1	2
Match 2/4	Quarter-finals	15 July 1924	Netherlands	Won	6	3	3
Match 3/4	Semi-finals	16 July 1924	Sweden	Won	4	2	2
Match 4/4	Gold medal match	17 July 1924	Belgium	Won	3	0	3
Total	Matches played: 4 • Wins: 4 • Ties: 0 • Defeats: 0 • Win %: 100%				16	6	10

Source: Official Reports (PDF): 1924 (pp. 488, 490, 492).

- Head coach: (France)

Roster
#	Player	Pos	Height	Weight	Date of birth	Age of winning gold	Oly debut	ISHOF member
P1	Albert Deborgies	FP			6 July 1902	22 years, 14 days	Yes	
P2	Noël Delberghe	FP			25 December 1897	26 years, 208 days	Yes	
P3	Robert Desmettre	FP			5 August 1901	22 years, 350 days	Yes	
P4	Paul Dujardin	GK			10 May 1894	30 years, 71 days	Yes	
P5	Albert Mayaud	FP			31 March 1899	25 years, 111 days	No	
P6	Henri Padou	FP			15 May 1898	26 years, 66 days	No	1970
P7	Georges Rigal (C)	FP			6 January 1890	34 years, 196 days	No	
Average					21 September 1897	26 years, 303 days		

Sources:

- Official Reports (PDF): 1924 (pp. 488, 490, 492);
- Olympedia: 1924 (men's tournament);
- Sports Reference: 1924 (men's tournament);
- ISHOF.

=== 1920 (Great Britain, 4th title) ===
* Edition of men's tournament: 5th

- Host city: Antwerp, Belgium
- Number of participating teams: 12
- Competition format: Single-elimination tournament; Bergvall system for second- and third-place
- Champion: Great Britain (4th title)

Match	Round	Date	Opponent	Result	Goals for	Goals against	Goal diff.
Match 1/3	Round one	24 August 1920	Spain	Won	9	0	9
Match 2/3	Semi-finals	26 August 1920	United States	Won	7	2	5
Match 3/3	Gold medal match	27 August 1920	Belgium	Won	3	2	1
Total	Matches played: 3 • Wins: 3 • Ties: 0 • Defeats: 0 • Win %: 100%				19	4	15

Source: Official Reports (PDF): 1920 (p. 130).

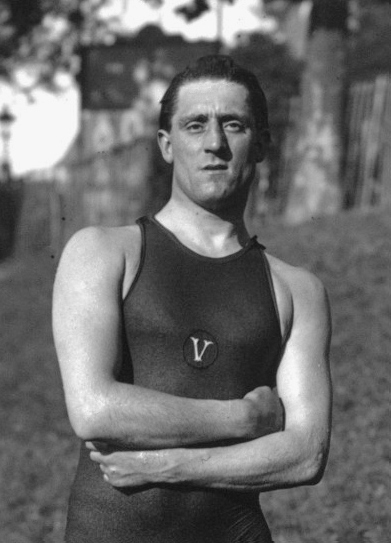
Paul Radmilovic won three gold medals in water polo at the 1908, 1912 and 1920 Olympics.

- Head coach: (United Kingdom)

Roster
#	Player	Pos	Height	Weight	Date of birth	Age of winning gold	Oly debut	ISHOF member
P1	Charles Bugbee	FP	1.91 m (6 ft 3 in)		29 August 1887	33 years, 0 days	No	
P2	William Dean	FP			6 February 1887	33 years, 205 days	Yes	
P3	Christopher Jones	FP			23 June 1884	36 years, 67 days	Yes	
P4	William Peacock	FP			6 December 1891	28 years, 267 days	Yes	
P5	Noel Purcell	FP			15 November 1891	28 years, 288 days	Yes	
P6	Paul Radmilovic (C)	FP	1.80 m (5 ft 11 in)	76 kg (168 lb)	5 March 1886	34 years, 177 days	No	1967
P7	Charles Smith	GK	1.86 m (6 ft 1 in)	105 kg (231 lb)	26 January 1879	41 years, 216 days	No	1981
Average					24 November 1886	33 years, 279 days		

Sources:

- Official Reports (PDF): 1920 (p. 130);
- Olympedia: 1920 (men's tournament);
- Sports Reference: 1920 (men's tournament);
- ISHOF.

=== 1912 (Great Britain, 3rd title) ===
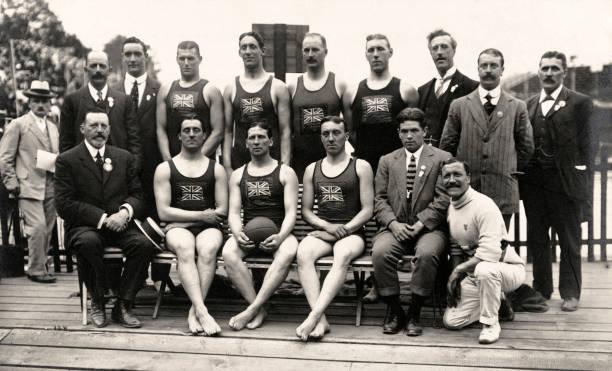
The 1912 Great Britain men's Olympic water polo team.

- Edition of men's tournament: 4th
- Host city: Stockholm, Sweden
- Number of participating teams: 6
- Competition format: Single-elimination tournament
- Champion: Great Britain (3rd title)

Match	Round	Date	Opponent	Result	Goals for	Goals against	Goal diff.
Match 1/3	Round one	7 July 1912	Belgium	Won	7	5	2
Match 2/3	Semi-finals	11 July 1912	Sweden	Won	6	3	3
Match 3/3	Gold medal match	13 July 1912	Austria	Won	8	0	8
Total	Matches played: 3 • Wins: 3 • Ties: 0 • Defeats: 0 • Win %: 100%				21	8	13

Source: Official Reports (PDF): 1912 (pp. 1022, 1024, 1033).

- Head coach: (United Kingdom)

Roster
#	Player	Pos	Height	Weight	Date of birth	Age of winning gold	Oly debut	ISHOF member
P1	Isaac Bentham	FP			27 October 1886	25 years, 263 days	Yes	
P2	Charles Bugbee	FP	1.91 m (6 ft 3 in)		29 August 1887	24 years, 322 days	Yes	
P3	George Cornet	FP	1.91 m (6 ft 3 in)	98 kg (216 lb)	15 July 1877	35 years, 1 day	No	
P4	Arthur Hill	FP			9 January 1888	24 years, 189 days	Yes	
P5	Paul Radmilovic	FP	1.80 m (5 ft 11 in)	76 kg (168 lb)	5 March 1886	26 years, 133 days	No	1967
P6	Charles Smith	GK	1.86 m (6 ft 1 in)	105 kg (231 lb)	26 January 1879	33 years, 172 days	No	1981
P7	George Wilkinson (C)	FP	1.73 m (5 ft 8 in)	80 kg (176 lb)	3 March 1879	33 years, 135 days	No	1980
Average					30 June 1883	29 years, 16 days		

Sources:

- Official Reports (PDF): 1912 (pp. 1022, 1024, 1033);
- Olympedia: 1912 (men's tournament);
- Sports Reference: 1912 (men's tournament);
- ISHOF.

=== 1908 (Great Britain, 2nd title) ===
* Edition of men's tournament: 3rd

- Host city: London, United Kingdom
- Number of participating teams: 4
- Competition format: Single-elimination tournament
- Champion: Great Britain (2nd title)

Match	Round	Date	Opponent	Result	Goals for	Goals against	Goal diff.
Match 1/3	Round one	15 July 1908	Bye				
Match 2/3	Semi-finals	20 July 1908	Austria	Austria withdrew before the tournament started.			
Match 3/3	Gold medal match	22 July 1908	Belgium	Won	9	2	7
Total	Matches played: 1 • Wins: 1 • Ties: 0 • Defeats: 0 • Win %: 100%				9	2	7

Source: Official Reports (PDF): 1908 (pp. 360, 361).

- Head coach: (United Kingdom)

Roster
#	Player	Pos	Height	Weight	Date of birth	Age of winning gold	Oly debut	ISHOF member
P1	George Cornet	FP	1.91 m (6 ft 3 in)	98 kg (216 lb)	15 July 1877	31 years, 7 days	Yes	
P2	Charles Forsyth	FP	1.79 m (5 ft 10 in)	76 kg (168 lb)	10 January 1885	23 years, 194 days	Yes	
P3	George Nevinson	FP	1.74 m (5 ft 9 in)		3 October 1882	25 years, 293 days	Yes	
P4	Paul Radmilovic	FP	1.80 m (5 ft 11 in)	76 kg (168 lb)	5 March 1886	22 years, 139 days	Yes	1967
P5	Charles Smith (C)	GK	1.86 m (6 ft 1 in)	105 kg (231 lb)	26 January 1879	29 years, 178 days	Yes	1981
P6	Thomas Thould	FP	1.78 m (5 ft 10 in)	73 kg (161 lb)	11 January 1886	22 years, 193 days	Yes	
P7	George Wilkinson	FP	1.73 m (5 ft 8 in)	80 kg (176 lb)	3 March 1879	29 years, 141 days	Yes	1980
Average			1.80 m (5 ft 11 in)		2 April 1882	26 years, 111 days		

Sources:

- Official Reports (PDF): 1908 (pp. 360, 361);
- Olympedia: 1908 (men's tournament);
- Sports Reference: 1908 (men's tournament);
- ISHOF.

=== 1904 (demonstration program) ===
- Edition of men's tournament: 2nd (demonstration program)
- Host city: St. Louis, United States
- Number of participating teams: 3 teams from the United States
- Competition format: Single-elimination tournament
- Champion: New York Athletic Club

=== 1900 (Great Britain, 1st title) ===
* Edition of men's tournament: 1st

- Host city: Paris, France
- Number of participating teams: 7 teams from 4 countries, including 4 from France (Note: France had four teams compete in 1900. Bronze medals were given to the losers of both semifinals; France took both bronze.)
- Competition format: Single-elimination tournament
- Champion: Osborne Swimming Club (Great Britain, 1st title)

Match	Round	Date	Opponent	Result	Goals for	Goals against	Goal diff.
Match 1/3	Round one	11 August 1900	Tritons Lillois (France)	Won	12	0	12
Match 2/3	Semi-finals	12 August 1900	Pupilles de Neptune de Lille #2 (France)	Won	10	1	9
Match 3/3	Gold medal match	12 August 1900	Brussels Swimming and Water Polo Club (Belgium)	Won	7	2	5
Total	Matches played: 3 • Wins: 3 • Ties: 0 • Defeats: 0 • Win %: 100%				29	3	26

Sources:

- Olympedia: 1900 (men's tournament);
- Sports Reference: 1900 (men's tournament).
- Head coach: (United Kingdom)

Roster
#	Player	Pos	Height	Weight	Date of birth	Age of winning gold	Oly debut	ISHOF member
P1	Thomas Coe (C)	FP			3 November 1873	26 years, 282 days	Yes	
P2	Robert Crawshaw	FP			6 March 1869	31 years, 159 days	Yes	
P3	William Henry	GK			28 June 1859	41 years, 45 days	Yes	1974
P4	John Jarvis	FP			24 February 1872	28 years, 169 days	Yes	1968
P5	Peter Kemp	FP			1878	21 years, 224 days – 22 years, 223 days	Yes	
P6	Victor Lindberg	FP			26 July 1875	25 years, 17 days	Yes	
P7	Frederick Stapleton	FP			11 March 1877	23 years, 154 days	Yes	
Average					15 March 1872 – 6 May 1872	28 years, 98 days – 28 years, 150 days		

Sources:

- Olympedia: 1900 (men's tournament);
- Sports Reference: 1900 (men's tournament);
- ISHOF.

== See also ==
- Water polo at the Summer Olympics
- Lists of Olympic water polo records and statistics
  - List of men's Olympic water polo tournament records and statistics
  - List of women's Olympic water polo tournament records and statistics
  - List of Olympic champions in women's water polo
  - National team appearances in the men's Olympic water polo tournament
  - National team appearances in the women's Olympic water polo tournament
  - List of players who have appeared in multiple men's Olympic water polo tournaments
  - List of players who have appeared in multiple women's Olympic water polo tournaments
  - List of Olympic medalists in water polo (men)
  - List of Olympic medalists in water polo (women)
  - List of men's Olympic water polo tournament top goalscorers
  - List of women's Olympic water polo tournament top goalscorers
  - List of men's Olympic water polo tournament goalkeepers
  - List of women's Olympic water polo tournament goalkeepers
  - List of Olympic venues in water polo
- List of world champions in men's water polo
- List of world champions in women's water polo

== Sources ==
=== Official Reports (IOC) ===
PDF documents in the LA84 Foundation Digital Library:

- Official Report of the 1896 Olympic Games (download, archive)
- Official Report of the 1900 Olympic Games (download, archive)
- Official Report of the 1904 Olympic Games (download, archive)
- Official Report of the 1908 Olympic Games (download, archive) (pp. 359–361)
- Official Report of the 1912 Olympic Games (download, archive) (pp. 1021–1024, 1031–1037)
- Official Report of the 1920 Olympic Games (download, archive) (p. 130)
- Official Report of the 1924 Olympic Games (download, archive) (pp. 439–440, 486–494)
- Official Report of the 1928 Olympic Games (download, archive) (pp. 746–757, 797–807)
- Official Report of the 1932 Olympic Games (download, archive) (pp. 619–623, 646–652)
- Official Report of the 1936 Olympic Games, v.2 (download, archive) (pp. 345–356)
- Official Report of the 1948 Olympic Games (download, archive) (pp. 537–540, 640–647)
- Official Report of the 1952 Olympic Games (download, archive) (pp. 600–608)
- Official Report of the 1956 Olympic Games (download, archive) (pp. 592–594, 624–627)
- Official Report of the 1960 Olympic Games (download, archive) (pp. 552–555, 617–634)
- Official Report of the 1964 Olympic Games, v.2 (download, archive) (pp. 682–698)
- Official Report of the 1968 Olympic Games, v.3 (download, archive) (pp. 449–466, 811–826)
- Official Report of the 1972 Olympic Games, v.3 (download, archive) (pp. 331, 353–365)
- Official Report of the 1976 Olympic Games, v.3 (download, archive) (pp. 446–447, 484–497)
- Official Report of the 1980 Olympic Games, v.3 (download, archive) (pp. 458, 495–510)
- Official Report of the 1984 Olympic Games, v.2 (download, archive) (pp. 528–534)
- Official Report of the 1988 Olympic Games, v.2 (download, archive) (pp. 590–598)
- Official Report of the 1992 Olympic Games, v.5 (download, archive) (pp. 354, 386–400)
- Official Report of the 1996 Olympic Games, v.3 (download, archive) (pp. 56–73)

=== Official Results Books (IOC) ===
PDF documents in the LA84 Foundation Digital Library:

- Official Results Book – 2000 Olympic Games – Water Polo (download, archive)
- Official Results Book – 2004 Olympic Games – Water Polo (download, archive)
- Official Results Book – 2008 Olympic Games – Water Polo (download, archive)

PDF documents on the FINA website:

- Official Results Book – 2012 Olympic Games – Diving, Swimming, Synchronised Swimming, Water Polo (archive) (pp. 284–507)

PDF documents in the Olympic World Library:

- Official Results Book – 2016 Olympic Games – Water Polo (archive)

PDF documents on the International Olympic Committee website:

- Official Results Book – 2020 Olympic Games – Water Polo (archive)
- Official Results Book – 2024 Olympic Games – Water Polo

=== Official Reports (FINA) ===
PDF documents on the FINA website:

- HistoFINA – Water polo medalists and statistics (as of September 2019) (archive) (pp. 4–13)
- 1870–2020 | 150 years of Water Polo – Evolution of its rules (archive)

=== Official website (IOC) ===
Water polo on the International Olympic Committee website:

- Water polo
- Men's water polo

=== Olympedia ===
Water polo on the Olympedia website:

- Water polo Archived 2021-12-28 at the Wayback Machine
- Men's water polo
- Athlete count for water polo
- Water polo venues
- Water polo at the 1900 Summer Olympics (men's tournament)
- Water polo at the 1904 Summer Olympics (men's tournament)
- Water polo at the 1908 Summer Olympics (men's tournament)
- Water polo at the 1912 Summer Olympics (men's tournament)
- Water polo at the 1920 Summer Olympics (men's tournament)
- Water polo at the 1924 Summer Olympics (men's tournament)
- Water polo at the 1928 Summer Olympics (men's tournament)
- Water polo at the 1932 Summer Olympics (men's tournament)
- Water polo at the 1936 Summer Olympics (men's tournament)
- Water polo at the 1948 Summer Olympics (men's tournament)
- Water polo at the 1952 Summer Olympics (men's tournament)
- Water polo at the 1956 Summer Olympics (men's tournament)
- Water polo at the 1960 Summer Olympics (men's tournament)
- Water polo at the 1964 Summer Olympics (men's tournament)
- Water polo at the 1968 Summer Olympics (men's tournament)
- Water polo at the 1972 Summer Olympics (men's tournament)
- Water polo at the 1976 Summer Olympics (men's tournament)
- Water polo at the 1980 Summer Olympics (men's tournament)
- Water polo at the 1984 Summer Olympics (men's tournament)
- Water polo at the 1988 Summer Olympics (men's tournament)
- Water polo at the 1992 Summer Olympics (men's tournament)
- Water polo at the 1996 Summer Olympics (men's tournament)
- Water polo at the 2000 Summer Olympics (men's tournament)
- Water polo at the 2004 Summer Olympics (men's tournament)
- Water polo at the 2008 Summer Olympics (men's tournament)
- Water polo at the 2012 Summer Olympics (men's tournament)
- Water polo at the 2016 Summer Olympics (men's tournament)
- Water polo at the 2020 Summer Olympics (men's tournament)

=== Sports Reference ===
Water polo on the Sports Reference website:

- Country Medal Leaders & Athlete Medal Leaders (1900–2016) (archived)
- Men's water polo (1900–2016) (archived)
- Water polo at the 1900 Summer Games (men's tournament) (archived)
- Water polo at the 1904 Summer Games (men's tournament) (archived)
- Water polo at the 1908 Summer Games (men's tournament) (archived)
- Water polo at the 1912 Summer Games (men's tournament) (archived)
- Water polo at the 1920 Summer Games (men's tournament) (archived)
- Water polo at the 1924 Summer Games (men's tournament) (archived)
- Water polo at the 1928 Summer Games (men's tournament) (archived)
- Water polo at the 1932 Summer Games (men's tournament) (archived)
- Water polo at the 1936 Summer Games (men's tournament) (archived)
- Water polo at the 1948 Summer Games (men's tournament) (archived)
- Water polo at the 1952 Summer Games (men's tournament) (archived)
- Water polo at the 1956 Summer Games (men's tournament) (archived)
- Water polo at the 1960 Summer Games (men's tournament) (archived)
- Water polo at the 1964 Summer Games (men's tournament) (archived)
- Water polo at the 1968 Summer Games (men's tournament) (archived)
- Water polo at the 1972 Summer Games (men's tournament) (archived)
- Water polo at the 1976 Summer Games (men's tournament) (archived)
- Water polo at the 1980 Summer Games (men's tournament) (archived)
- Water polo at the 1984 Summer Games (men's tournament) (archived)
- Water polo at the 1988 Summer Games (men's tournament) (archived)
- Water polo at the 1992 Summer Games (men's tournament) (archived)
- Water polo at the 1996 Summer Games (men's tournament) (archived)
- Water polo at the 2000 Summer Games (men's tournament) (archived)
- Water polo at the 2004 Summer Games (men's tournament) (archived)
- Water polo at the 2008 Summer Games (men's tournament) (archived)
- Water polo at the 2012 Summer Games (men's tournament) (archived)
- Water polo at the 2016 Summer Games (men's tournament) (archived)
- Water polo at the 2020 Summer Games (men's tournament) (archived)

=== Todor66 ===
Water polo on the Todor66 website:

- Water polo at the Summer Games
- Water polo at the 1900 Summer Olympics (men's tournament)
- Water polo at the 1904 Summer Olympics (men's tournament)
- Water polo at the 1908 Summer Olympics (men's tournament)
- Water polo at the 1912 Summer Olympics (men's tournament)
- Water polo at the 1920 Summer Olympics (men's tournament)
- Water polo at the 1924 Summer Olympics (men's tournament)
- Water polo at the 1928 Summer Olympics (men's tournament)
- Water polo at the 1932 Summer Olympics (men's tournament)
- Water polo at the 1936 Summer Olympics (men's tournament)
- Water polo at the 1948 Summer Olympics (men's tournament)
- Water polo at the 1952 Summer Olympics (men's tournament)
- Water polo at the 1956 Summer Olympics (men's tournament)
- Water polo at the 1960 Summer Olympics (men's tournament)
- Water polo at the 1964 Summer Olympics (men's tournament)
- Water polo at the 1968 Summer Olympics (men's tournament, men's qualification)
- Water polo at the 1972 Summer Olympics (men's tournament, men's qualification)
- Water polo at the 1976 Summer Olympics (men's tournament, men's European qualification)
- Water polo at the 1980 Summer Olympics (men's tournament, men's European qualification, men's world qualification)
- Water polo at the 1984 Summer Olympics (men's tournament, men's qualification)
- Water polo at the 1988 Summer Olympics (men's tournament, men's qualification)
- Water polo at the 1992 Summer Olympics (men's tournament, men's qualification)
- Water polo at the 1996 Summer Olympics (men's tournament, men's qualification)
- Water polo at the 2000 Summer Olympics (men's tournament, men's qualification)
- Water polo at the 2004 Summer Olympics (men's tournament, men's qualification)
- Water polo at the 2008 Summer Olympics (men's tournament, men's qualification)
- Water polo at the 2012 Summer Olympics (men's tournament, men's qualification)
- Water polo at the 2016 Summer Olympics (men's tournament, men's qualification)
- Water polo at the 2020 Summer Olympics (men's tournament, men's qualification)
- Water polo at the 2024 Summer Olympics (men's tournament, men's qualification)

=== ISHOF ===
International Swimming Hall of Fame (ISHOF) website:

- Honorees Listed by Category – Water Polo
- Honorees Listed by Category – Coaches
- Honorees Listed by Category – Contributors
- Honorees by Country
- Honorees By Last Name
