= Water polo at the 1986 World Aquatics Championships =

1986 World Water Polo Championship
- 5th FINA World Aquatics Championships
- Location: Spain
- Date: 13–23 August
- Category: 1986 World Aquatics Championships

The water polo events at the 1986 World Aquatics Championships were held from 13 to 23 August 1986, in Madrid, Spain.

== Medal summary ==
=== Medal table ===
Rank	Nation	Gold	Silver	Bronze	Total
1	Australia (AUS)	1	0	0	1
1	Yugoslavia (YUG)	1	0	0	1
3	Italy (ITA)	0	1	0	1
3	Netherlands (NED)	0	1	0	1
5	Soviet Union (URS)	0	0	1	1
5	United States (USA)	0	0	1	1
Totals (6 entries)		2	2	2	6

=== Medalists ===
Event	Gold	Silver	Bronze
Men	Yugoslavia Dragan Andrić; Perica Bukić; Veselin Đuho; Milorad Krivokapić; Deni Lušić; Igor Milanović; Tomislav Paškvalin; Zoran Petrović; Andrija Popović; Dubravko Šimenc; Aleksandar Šoštar; Anto Vasović; Mirko Vičević. Head coach: Ratko Rudić	Italy Gianni Averaimo; Antonello Steardo; Sandro Campagna; Andrea Pisano; Paolo Trapanese; Massimiliano Ferretti; Marco D'Altrui; Paolo Caldarella; Mario Fiorillo; Ricardo Tempestini; Francesco Porzio; Stefano Postiglione; Alfio Missagi Head coach: Federico "Fritz" Dennerlein	Soviet Union Serghei Marcoci; Nikolai Smirnov; Yevgeny Sharonov; Nikolay Sharafeyev; Mikhail Ivanov; Sergey Kotenko; Dmitry Apanasenko; Viktor Berendyuha; Pavel Prokopchuk; Yevgeny Grishin; Sergey Naumov; Giorgi Mshvenieradze; Nurlan Mendygaliyev Head coach: Aleksandr Kabanov
Women	Australia	Netherlands	United States
