= Water polo at the 1986 World Aquatics Championships – Men's tournament =

Tournament details
- Venue: Spain (in Madrid host cities)
- Dates: 13 – 23 August
- Teams: 15 (from 4 confederations)

Final positions
- Champions: Yugoslavia (1st title)
- Runners-up: Italy
- Third place: Soviet Union
- Fourth place: United States

Tournament statistics
- Matches played: 49
- Goals scored: 797 (16.27 per match)

The 1986 Men's World Water Polo Championship was the fifth edition of the men's water polo tournament at the World Aquatics Championships, organised by the world governing body in aquatics, the FINA. The tournament was held from 13 to 23 August 1986, and was incorporated into the 1986 World Aquatics Championships in Madrid, Spain.

This was the only men's world championship to have featured fifteen teams instead of the usual sixteen. Yugoslavia won its first title by defeating Italy in the final. The Soviet Union, the defending champion, came third.

== Participating teams ==
Americas	Europe	Oceania
Brazil; Canada; Cuba; United States	France; Greece; Hungary; Italy; Israel; Netherlands; Soviet Union; Spain; West Germany; Yugoslavia	Australia

=== Groups formed ===
Group A

- Hungary
- Israel
- Italy
- Spain

Group B

- Australia
- Cuba
- Yugoslavia

Group C

- Canada
- France
- Netherlands
- West Germany

Group D

- Brazil
- Greece
- Soviet Union
- United States

== First round ==
Qualified for places 1–8, separated in 2 round robin groups of 4 teams each. (Group E and F)
Qualified for places 9–16, separated in 2 round robin groups of 4 teams each. (Group G and H)

=== Group A ===
Pos	Team	Pts	Pld	W	D	L	GF	GA	GD
1	Italy	6	3	3	0	0	24	20	+4
2	Spain	4	3	2	0	1	35	19	+16
3	Hungary	2	3	1	0	2	29	18	+11
4	Israel	0	3	0	0	3	13	44	−31

- 14 August 1986

Hungary	16 – 2	Israel
Italy	8 – 7	Spain

- 15 August 1986

Italy	9 – 8	Hungary
Spain	21 – 6	Israel

- 16 August 1986

Italy	7 – 5	Israel
Spain	7 – 5	Hungary

=== Group B ===
Pos	Team	Pts	Pld	W	D	L	GF	GA	GD
1	Yugoslavia	3	2	1	1	0	23	15	+8
2	Cuba	3	2	1	1	0	23	21	+2
3	Australia	0	2	0	0	2	14	24	−10

- 14 August 1986

Yugoslavia	12 – 4	Australia

- 15 August 1986

Cuba	12 – 10	Australia

- 16 August 1986

Yugoslavia	11 – 11	Cuba

=== Group C ===
Pos	Team	Pts	Pld	W	D	L	GF	GA	GD
1	West Germany	6	3	3	0	0	26	14	+12
2	France	4	3	2	0	1	18	20	−2
3	Canada	2	3	1	0	2	17	21	−4
4	Netherlands	0	3	0	0	3	15	21	−6

- 14 August 1986

West Germany	8 – 3	Canada
France	5 – 4	Netherlands

- 15 August 1986

Canada	8 – 4	Netherlands
West Germany	10 – 4	France

- 16 August 1986

France	9 – 6	Canada
West Germany	8 – 7	Netherlands

=== Group D ===
Pos	Team	Pts	Pld	W	D	L	GF	GA	GD
1	United States	6	3	3	0	0	38	17	+21
2	Soviet Union	4	3	2	0	1	36	27	+9
3	Brazil	1	3	0	1	2	25	40	−15
4	Greece	1	3	0	1	2	19	34	−15

- 14 August 1986

Soviet Union	16 – 10	Brazil
United States	13 – 3	Greece

- 15 August 1986

United States	15 – 6	Brazil
Soviet Union	12 – 7	Greece

- 16 August 1986

United States	10 – 8	Soviet Union
Brazil	9 – 9	Greece

== Second round ==
Qualified for places 1–4 in a knockout system with 3rd place game.
Will play for places 5–8 in a round robin group. (Group I)
Will play for places 9–12 in a round robin group. (Group J)
Will play for places 13–16 in a round robin group (Group K)

=== Group E ===
Pos	Team	Pts	Pld	W	D	L	GF	GA	GD
1	Yugoslavia	5	3	2	1	0	29	22	+7
2	Italy	4	3	2	0	1	22	22	0
3	Cuba	3	3	1	1	1	30	31	−1
4	Spain	0	3	0	0	3	24	30	−6

Preliminary round results apply.

- 18 August 1986

Yugoslavia	10 – 6	Spain
Italy	9 – 7	Cuba

- 19 August 1986

Yugoslavia	8 – 5	Italy
Cuba	12 – 11	Spain

=== Group F ===
Pos	Team	Pts	Pld	W	D	L	GF	GA	GD
1	United States	5	3	2	1	0	26	23	+3
2	Soviet Union	4	3	2	0	1	30	22	+8
3	West Germany	2	3	1	0	2	27	23	+4
4	France	0	3	0	1	2	14	29	−15

Preliminary round results apply.

- 18 August 1986

Soviet Union	13 – 4	France
United States	10 – 9	West Germany

- 19 August 1986

United States	6 – 6	France
Soviet Union	9 – 8	West Germany

=== Group G ===
Pos	Team	Pts	Pld	W	D	L	GF	GA	GD
1	Hungary	4	2	2	0	0	23	8	+15
2	Australia	2	2	1	0	1	17	8	+9
3	Israel	0	2	0	0	2	3	27	−24

Preliminary round results apply.

- 18 August 1986

Australia	11 – 1	Israel

- 19 August 1986

Hungary	7 – 6	Australia

=== Group H ===
Pos	Team	Pts	Pld	W	D	L	GF	GA	GD
1	Greece	5	3	2	1	0	20	16	+4
2	Brazil	3	3	1	1	1	23	20	+3
3	Canada	2	3	1	0	2	16	19	−3
4	Netherlands	2	3	1	0	2	14	18	−4

Preliminary round results apply.

- 18 August 1986

Greece	5 – 3	Netherlands
Brazil	9 – 4	Canada

- 19 August 1986

Netherlands	7 – 5	Brazil
Greece	6 – 4	Canada

== Final round ==
=== 13th – 15th places (Group L) ===
Pos	Team	Pts	Pld	W	D	L	GF	GA	GD
13	Canada	3	2	1	1	0	16	12	+4
14	Netherlands	2	2	1	0	1	12	14	−2
15	Israel	1	2	0	1	1	14	16	−2

Results of previous rounds apply.

- 21 August 1986

Netherlands	8 – 6	Israel

- 22 August 1986

Canada	8 – 8	Israel

=== 9th – 12th places (Group K) ===
Pos	Team	Pts	Pld	W	D	L	GF	GA	GD
9	Hungary	6	3	3	0	0	29	25	+4
10	Australia	4	3	2	0	1	27	16	+11
11	Greece	1	3	0	1	2	24	30	−6
12	Brazil	1	3	0	1	2	22	31	−9

Results of previous rounds apply.

- 21 August 1986

Hungary	11 – 9	Brazil
Australia	10 – 5	Greece

- 22 August 1986

Australia	11 – 4	Brazil
Hungary	11 – 10	Greece

=== 5th – 8th places (Group J) ===
Pos	Team	Pts	Pld	W	D	L	GF	GA	GD
5	Spain	4	3	2	0	1	37	24	+13
6	West Germany	4	3	2	0	1	29	27	+2
7	Cuba	3	3	1	1	1	27	29	−2
8	France	1	3	0	1	2	15	28	−13

Results of previous rounds apply.

- 21 August 1986

Spain	15 – 8	West Germany
Cuba	7 – 7	France

- 22 August 1986

Spain	11 – 4	France
West Germany	11 – 8	Cuba

== Semifinals ==
Team #1	Res.	Team #2
Yugoslavia (Socialist Federal Republic of Yugoslavia)	9–8	Soviet Union
Italy	8–7	United States

== Bronze match ==
Team #1	Res.	Team #2
Soviet Union	8–6	United States

== Final ==
Team #1	Res.	Team #2
Yugoslavia (Socialist Federal Republic of Yugoslavia)	12–11	Italy

== Final ranking ==
RANK	TEAM
1st place, gold medalist(s)	Yugoslavia
2nd place, silver medalist(s)	Italy
3rd place, bronze medalist(s)	Soviet Union
4.	United States
5.	Spain
6.	West Germany
7.	Cuba
8.	France
9.	Hungary
10.	Australia
11.	Greece
12.	Brazil
13.	Canada
14.	Netherlands
15.	Israel

1986 FINA Men's World champions

Yugoslavia
First title

Team roster

Dragan Andrić, Perica Bukić, Veselin Đuho, Milorad Krivokapić, Deni Lušić, Igor Milanović, Tomislav Paškvalin, Zoran Petrović, Andrija Popović, Dubravko Šimenc, Aleksandar Šoštar, Anto Vasović, Mirko Vičević.
Head coach: Ratko Rudić

== Medalists ==
Gold	Silver	Bronze
Yugoslavia Dragan Andrić; Perica Bukić; Veselin Đuho; Milorad Krivokapić; Deni Lušić; Igor Milanović; Tomislav Paškvalin; Zoran Petrović; Andrija Popović; Dubravko Šimenc; Aleksandar Šoštar; Anto Vasović; Mirko Vičević Head coach: Ratko Rudić	Italy Gianni Averaimo; Antonello Steardo; Sandro Campagna; Andrea Pisano; Paolo Trapanese; Massimiliano Ferretti; Marco D'Altrui; Paolo Caldarella; Mario Fiorillo; Ricardo Tempestini; Francesco Porzio; Stefano Postiglione; Alfio Missagi Head coach: Federico "Fritz" Dennerlein	Soviet Union Serghei Marcoci; Nikolai Smirnov; Yevgeny Sharonov; Nikolay Sharafeyev; Mikhail Ivanov; Sergey Kotenko; Dmitry Apanasenko; Viktor Berendyuha; Pavel Prokopchuk; Yevgeny Grishin; Sergey Naumov; Giorgi Mshvenieradze; Nurlan Mendygaliyev Head coach: Aleksandr Kabanov
