= Water polo at the 1994 World Aquatics Championships – Men's tournament =

Tournament details
- Venue(s): Italy (in Rome host cities)
- Dates: 1 – 11 September
- Teams: 16 (from 5 confederations)

Final positions
- Champions: Italy (2nd title)
- Runner-up: Spain
- Third place: Russia
- Fourth place: Croatia

Tournament statistics
- Matches played: 56
- Goals scored: 945 (16.88 per match)
- Top scorer(s): (Spain) Manuel Estiarte (25 goals)

The 1994 Men's World Water Polo Championship was the seventh edition of the men's water polo tournament at the World Aquatics Championships, organised by the world governing body in aquatics, the FINA. The tournament was held from 1 to 11 September 1994, and was incorporated into the 1994 World Aquatics Championships in Rome, Italy.

== Participating teams ==
Africa	Americas	Asia	Europe	Oceania
South Africa	Canada; Cuba; United States	Kazakhstan	Croatia; Germany; Greece; Hungary; Italy; Netherlands; Romania; Russia; Spain	Australia; New Zealand

=== Groups formed ===
Group A

- Germany
- Netherlands
- Romania
- United States

Group B

- Australia
- Croatia
- New Zealand
- Spain

Group C

- Cuba
- Greece
- Russia
- South Africa

Group D

- Canada
- Hungary
- Italy
- Kazakhstan

== Preliminary round ==
Qualified for places 1–8, separated in 2 round robin groups of 4 teams each. (Group E and F)
Qualified for places 9–16, separated in 2 round robin groups of 4 teams each. (Group G and H)

=== Group A ===
Pos	Team	Pts	Pld	W	D	L	GF	GA	GD
1	Netherlands	4	3	2	0	1	25	22	+3
2	United States	4	3	2	0	1	25	22	+3
3	Germany	4	3	2	0	1	24	23	+1
4	Romania	0	3	0	0	3	19	26	−7

- September 2, 1994

United States	9 – 7	Romania
Germany	9 – 8	Netherlands

- September 3, 1994

Germany	8 – 6	Romania
Netherlands	8 – 7	United States

- September 4, 1994

United States	9 – 7	Germany
Netherlands	9 – 6	Romania

=== Group B ===
Pos	Team	Pts	Pld	W	D	L	GF	GA	GD
1	Spain	6	3	3	0	0	47	13	+34
2	Croatia	4	3	2	0	1	49	18	+31
3	Australia	2	3	1	0	2	39	22	+17
4	New Zealand	0	3	0	0	3	7	89	−82

- September 2, 1994

Australia	28 – 4	New Zealand
Spain	11 – 6	Croatia

- September 3, 1994

Spain	10 – 5	Australia
Croatia	38 – 1	New Zealand

- September 4, 1994

Croatia	8 – 6	Australia
Spain	26 – 2	New Zealand

=== Group C ===
Pos	Team	Pts	Pld	W	D	L	GF	GA	GD
1	Greece	5	3	2	1	0	27	14	+13
2	Russia	5	3	2	1	0	24	11	+13
3	Cuba	2	3	1	0	2	18	13	+5
4	South Africa	0	3	0	0	3	6	37	−31

- September 2, 1994

Greece	15 – 3	South Africa
Russia	5 – 4	Cuba

- September 3, 1994

Cuba	8 – 1	South Africa
Greece	5 – 5	Russia

- September 4, 1994

Russia	14 – 2	South Africa
Greece	7 – 6	Cuba

=== Group D ===
Pos	Team	Pts	Pld	W	D	L	GF	GA	GD
1	Italy	6	3	3	0	0	33	19	+14
2	Hungary	4	3	2	0	1	35	18	+17
3	Kazakhstan	2	3	1	0	2	24	29	−5
4	Canada	0	3	0	0	3	6	32	−26

- September 2, 1994

Hungary	13 – 0	Canada
Italy	13 – 7	Kazakhstan

- September 3, 1994

Kazakhstan	10 – 4	Canada
Italy	11 – 10	Hungary

- September 4, 1994

Hungary	12 – 7	Kazakhstan
Italy	9 – 2	Canada

== Second round ==
Qualified for places 1–4 in a knockout system with 3rd place game.
Will play for places 5–8 in a round robin group. (Group I)
Will play for places 9–12 in a round robin group. (Group J)
Will play for places 13–16 in a round robin group (Group K)

=== Group E ===
Pos	Team	Pts	Pld	W	D	L	GF	GA	GD
1	Spain	4	3	2	0	1	36	23	+13
2	Croatia	4	3	2	0	1	26	28	−2
3	Netherlands	2	3	1	0	2	25	34	−9
4	United States	2	3	1	0	2	24	26	−2

Preliminary round results apply.

- September 6, 1994

Spain	16 – 7	Netherlands
Croatia	9 – 7	United States

- September 7, 1994

Croatia	11 – 10	Netherlands
United States	10 – 9	Spain

=== Group F ===
Pos	Team	Pts	Pld	W	D	L	GF	GA	GD
1	Italy	6	3	3	0	0	25	20	+5
2	Russia	3	3	1	1	1	24	24	0
3	Hungary	2	3	1	0	2	33	30	+3
4	Greece	1	3	0	1	2	15	23	−8

Preliminary round results apply.

- September 6, 1994

Hungary	11 – 6	Greece
Italy	7 – 6	Russia

- September 7, 1994

Russia	13 – 12	Hungary
Italy	7 – 4	Greece

=== Group G ===
Pos	Team	Pts	Pld	W	D	L	GF	GA	GD
1	Australia	5	3	2	1	0	42	16	+26
2	Germany	5	3	2	1	0	30	15	+15
3	Romania	2	3	1	0	2	24	18	+6
4	New Zealand	0	3	0	0	3	9	56	−47

Preliminary round results apply.

- September 6, 1994

Germany	15 – 2	New Zealand
Australia	7 – 5	Romania

- September 7, 1994

Romania	13 – 3	New Zealand
Australia	7 – 7	Germany

=== Group H ===
Pos	Team	Pts	Pld	W	D	L	GF	GA	GD
1	Cuba	6	3	3	0	0	24	15	+9
2	Kazakhstan	4	3	2	0	1	33	15	+18
3	Canada	2	3	1	0	2	24	26	−2
4	South Africa	0	3	0	0	3	12	37	−25

Preliminary round results apply.

- September 6, 1994

Cuba	5 – 4	Kazakhstan
Canada	10 – 5	South Africa

- September 7, 1994

Kazakhstan	19 – 6	South Africa
Cuba	11 – 10	Canada

== Final round ==
=== 13th – 16th places (Group K) ===
Pos	Team	Pts	Pld	W	D	L	GF	GA	GD
13	Romania	6	3	3	0	0	34	17	+17
14	Canada	4	3	2	0	1	16	17	−1
15	South Africa	2	3	1	0	2	14	23	−9
16	New Zealand	0	3	0	0	3	7	24	−17

Results of previous rounds apply.

- September 9, 1994

Canada	8 – 2	New Zealand
Romania	11 – 6	South Africa

- September 10, 1994

South Africa	3 – 2	New Zealand
Romania	10 – 8	Canada

=== 9th – 12th places (Group J) ===
Pos	Team	Pts	Pld	W	D	L	GF	GA	GD
9	Germany	5	3	2	1	0	33	21	+12
10	Australia	5	3	2	1	0	28	23	+5
11	Cuba	2	3	1	0	2	19	26	−7
12	Kazakhstan	0	3	0	0	3	20	30	−10

Results of previous rounds apply.

- September 9, 1994

Germany	14 – 8	Kazakhstan
Australia	10 – 8	Cuba

- September 10, 1994

Australia	11 – 8	Kazakhstan
Germany	12 – 6	Cuba

=== 5th – 8th places (Group I) ===
Pos	Team	Pts	Pld	W	D	L	GF	GA	GD
5	Hungary	5	3	2	1	0	32	23	+9
6	United States	3	3	1	1	1	26	26	0
7	Greece	2	3	1	0	2	20	25	−5
8	Netherlands	2	3	1	0	2	20	24	−4

Results of previous rounds apply.

- September 9, 1994

Greece	7 – 6	Netherlands
Hungary	11 – 11	United States

- September 10, 1994

United States	8 – 7	Greece
Hungary	10 – 6	Netherlands

== Semi finals ==
- September 10, 1994

Italy	8 – 5	Croatia
Spain	9 – 6	Russia

== Finals ==
- September 11, 1994 — Bronze Medal Match

Russia	14 – 13	Croatia

- September 11, 1994 — Gold Medal Match

Italy	10 – 5	Spain

== Final ranking ==
RANK	TEAM
	Italy
	Spain
	Russia
4.	Croatia
5.	Hungary
6.	United States
7.	Greece
8.	Netherlands
9.	Germany
10.	Australia
11.	Cuba
12.	Kazakhstan
13.	Romania
14.	Canada
15.	South Africa
16.	New Zealand

1994 FINA Men's World champions

Italy
Second title

Team Roster

Alesandro Bovo, Roberto Calcaterra, Alessandro Campagna, Marco D'Altrui, Massimiliano Ferretti, Mario Fiorillo, Ferdinando Gandolfi, Amedeo Pomillio, Franco Porzio, Giuseppe Porzio, Carlo Silipo.
Head coach: Ratko Rudić

== Medalists ==
Gold	Silver	Bronze
Italy Carlo Silipo; Amedeo Pomilio; Roberto Calcaterra; Gianni Averaimo; Alessandro Bovo; Mario Fiorillo; Francesco Porzio; Ferdinando Gandolfi; Massimiliano Ferretti; Sandro Campagna; Pino Porzio; Marco D'Altrui; Francesco Attolico Head coach: Ratko Rudić	Spain Jorge Payá; Manuel Silvestre; Gabriel Hernández; Sergi Pedrerol; Jesús Rollán; Manuel Estiarte (c); Pedro García; Jordi Sans; Salvador Gómez; Miki Oca; Gustavo Marcos; Daniel Ballart; Josep Picó Head coach: Juan Jané	Russia Aleksandr Ogorodnikov; Sergey Yevstigneyev; Dmitri Dugin; Nikolay Maksimov; Aleksandr Yeryshov; Dmitry Apanasenko; Serghei Marcoci; Nikolay Kozlov; Sergey Ivlev; Dmitry Gorshkov; Yuriy Smoloviy; Maxim Apanasenko; Sergey Garbuzov Head coach: Aleksandr Kabanov

== Top goalscorers ==
Rank	Name	Goals
1	(Spain) Manuel Estiarte	25
2	(Romania) Vlad Hagiu	21
3	(Croatia) Dubravko Šimenc	19
4	(Australia) Rod Owen-Jones	15
4	(Cuba) Juan Hernández Silveira	15
4	(Kazakhstan) Askar Orazalinov	15
4	(United States) Chris Humbert	15
4	(Hungary) Tibor Benedek	15
