= Pro Recco =

Italian water polo club

- Founded: 1913; 113 years ago
- League: Serie A1
- Based in: Recco, Italy
- Arena: Piscina Comunale, Sori
- Colors
- Owner: Behring family and Hammarskjold family Gabriele Volpi (former)
- President: Maurizio Felugo
- Head coach: Sandro Sukno
- Championships: 11 LEN Champions League; 9 LEN Super Cup; 1 European Aquatics Euro Cup; 1 Adriatic League; 38 Italian Leagues; 19 Italian Cups
- Website: prorecco.com

A.S.D. Pro Recco (Official name: Associazione Sportiva Dilettantistica Pro Recco) is an Italian professional water polo club from Recco, in Liguria. It currently plays in Serie A1.

Pro Recco is the most successful club in men's water polo. In men's domestic water polo, the club has won a record 57 trophies: a record 38 Serie A1 titles, a record 19 Coppa Italia. In men's LEN European competitions, Pro Recco have won a record 21 trophies: a record 11 European Aquatics Champions League titles, a record 9 European Aquatics Super Cup titles and 1 European Aquatics Euro Cup. The club has also won 1 Adriatic League title.

In women's water polo, the women's team won 1 women's Serie A1 titles, 1 LEN Euro League Women title, 1 Women's LEN Super Cup, making Pro Recco the first sports club in history to have been crowned European Champions with both its men's and women's teams.

== History ==
Pro Recco was founded in 1913 as Rari Nantes Enotria. It has played in the A1 league, the Italian top division, since 1935.

The club is owned by Behring and Hammarskjold families.

It has won a total of 38 national titles. This one of the most in Italy. The first in 1959 and the latest in 2026; and the Coppa Italia in 1974, 2006, 2007, 2008, 2009, 2010, 2011, 2013, 2014, 2015, 2016, 2017, 2018, 2019, 2021, 2022, 2023, 2025, 2026. They have won the European Aquatics Champions League in 1964, 1983, 2003, 2007, 2008, 2010, 2012, 2015, 2021, 2022 and 2023; the European Aquatics Super Cup in 2004, 2007, 2008, 2010, 2012, 2015, 2021, 2022, 2023; The European Aquatics Euro Cup in 2025.

Pro Recco had a women's team for several seasons, most recently the 2011–12 season.

== Honours ==
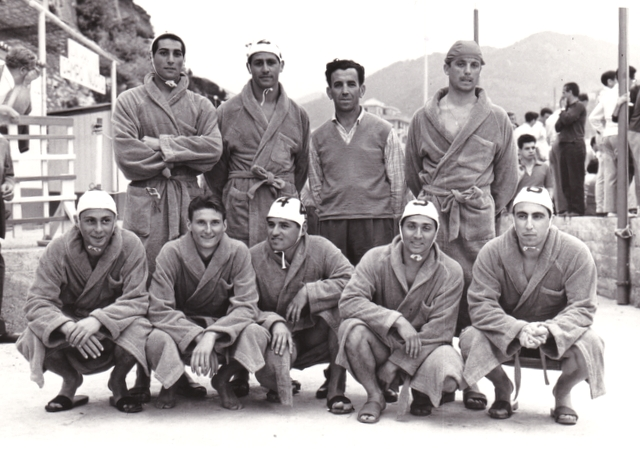
The team of Pro Recco in 1957: Eraldo Pizzo, Repetto, Zanone, Andreani, Guidotti, Cevasco, Maraschi, Piero Pizzo, Giorgio Odaglia

=== Domestic competitions ===
- Serie A1

Champions (38): 1959, 1960, 1961, 1962, 1964, 1965, 1966, 1967, 1968, 1969, 1970, 1971, 1972, 1974, 1978, 1982, 1983, 1984, 2002, 2006, 2007, 2008, 2009, 2010, 2011, 2012, 2013, 2014, 2015, 2016, 2017, 2018, 2019, 2022, 2023, 2024, 2025, 2026

- Coppa Italia

Winners (19): 1974, 2006, 2007, 2008, 2009, 2010, 2011, 2013, 2014, 2015, 2016, 2017, 2018, 2019, 2021, 2022, 2023, 2025, 2026

=== European competitions ===
==== European Aquatics competitions ====
- European Aquatics Champions League

Winners (11): 1965, 1984, 2003, 2007, 2008, 2010, 2012, 2015, 2021, 2022, 2023

- European Aquatics Super Cup

Winners (9): 2003, 2007, 2008, 2010, 2012, 2015, 2021, 2022, 2023

- European Aquatics Euro Cup

Winners (1): 2025

==== Other competitions ====
- Adriatic League

Winners (1): 2012

== Current team ==
=== 2024–2025 season ===
As of 1 November 2025

Head coach: (Croatia) Sandro Sukno

Players:

- (Italy) Gianmarco Nicosia (GK)
- (Italy) Tommaso Negri (GK)
- (Montenegro) Petar Vujosevic
- (Italy) Stefano Scarmi
- (Italy) Nicholas Presciutti
- (Italy) Matteo Iocchi Gratta
- (Italy) Francesco Condemi
- (Italy) Andrea Fondelli
- (Italy) Francesco Di Fulvio
- (Italy) Giacomo Cannella
- (Croatia) Rino Buric
- (Spain) Alvaro Granados
- (Hungary) Bence Haverkampf
- (United States) Ben Hallock
- (Italy) Lorenzo Demarchi
- (Slovakia) Lukas Durik
- (United States) Jack Larsen

== Famous players ==
=== Italian players ===
- (Italy) Simona Abbate
- (Italy) Marco Del Lungo
- (Italy) Matteo Aicardi
- (Italy) Alberto Angelini
- (Italy) Fabio Bencivenga
- (Italy) Roberta Bianconi
- (France) (Italy) Michaël Bodegas
- (Italy) Gonzalo Echenique
- (Italy) Maurizio Felugo
- (Australia) (Italy) Pietro Figlioli
- (Croatia) (Italy) Deni Fiorentini
- (Croatia) (Italy) Goran Fiorentini
- (Italy) Stefano Luongo
- (Italy) Alessandro Calcaterra
- (Italy) Luigi Castagnola
- (Italy) Aleksandra Cotti
- (Italy) Marco D'Altrui
- (Italy) Arnaldo Deserti
- (Italy) Luigi Di Costanzo
- (Italy) Francesco Di Fulvio
- (Italy) Massimiliano Ferretti
- (Italy) Niccolò Figari
- (Italy) Andrea Fondelli
- (Italy) Teresa Frassinetti
- (Italy) Alberto Ghibellini
- (Italy) Massimo Giacoppo
- (Italy) Elena Gigli
- (Italy) Alex Giorgetti
- (Italy) Niccolò Gitto
- (Italy) Luca Giustolisi
- (Italy) Luca Gualco
- (Italy) Giancarlo Guerrini
- (Italy) Franco Lavoratori
- (Italy) Gianni Lonzi
- (Italy) Mario Majoni
- (Italy) Andrea Mangiante
- (Italy) Federico Mistrangelo
- (Italy) Giacomo Pastorino
- (Italy) Eraldo Pizzo
- (Croatia) (Italy) Danijel Premuš
- (Italy) Christian Presciutti
- (Italy) Nicholas Presciutti
- (Italy) Elisa Queirolo
- (Italy) Paolo Ragosa
- (Italy) Giulia Rambaldi
- (Italy) Roldano Simeoni
- (Italy) Leonardo Sottani
- (Italy) Stefano Tempesti
- (Italy) Alessandro Velotto
- (Croatia) (Italy) Goran Volarević

=== Foreign players ===
- (Australia) Joe Kayes
- (Australia) Aaron Younger
- (Brazil) (Spain) Felipe Perrone
- (Croatia) Marko Bijač
- (Croatia) Luka Lončar
- (Croatia) Damir Burić
- (Croatia) Andro Bušlje
- (Croatia) Nikša Dobud
- (Croatia) Maro Joković
- (Croatia) Tomislav Paškvalin
- (Croatia) Sandro Sukno
- (Spain) Guillermo Molina
- (Spain) Jesús Rollán
- (Georgia (country)) Giorgi Mshvenieradze
- (Georgia (country)) Revaz Chomakhidze
- (Hungary) Tibor Benedek
- (Hungary) András Gyöngyösi
- (Hungary) György Horkai
- (Hungary) Gergő Zalánki
- (Hungary) Tamás Kásás
- (Hungary) Norbert Madaras
- (Hungary) Tamás Märcz
- (Hungary) István Szívós
- (Hungary) Márton Szívós
- (Montenegro) Aleksandar Ivović
- (Montenegro) Mlađan Janović
- (Montenegro) Predrag Jokić
- (Montenegro) Mirko Vičević
- (Montenegro) Boris Zloković
- (Serbia) Filip Filipović
- (Serbia) Danilo Ikodinović
- (Serbia) Dušan Mandić
- (Serbia) Slobodan Nikić
- (Serbia) Duško Pijetlović
- (Serbia) Andrija Prlainović
- (Serbia) Nikola Rađen
- (Serbia) Dejan Savić
- (Serbia) Vanja Udovičić
- (Serbia) Vladimir Vujasinović
- (United States) Ben Hallock

== Famous coaches ==
- (Croatia) Ratko Rudić
- (Italy) Giuseppe Porzio
- (Serbia) Igor Milanović
