= Italy men's Olympic water polo team records and statistics =

This article lists various water polo records and statistics in relation to the Italy men's national water polo team at the Summer Olympics.

The Italy men's national water polo team has participated in 21 of 27 official men's water polo tournaments, continuously since 1948.

== Abbreviations ==
Apps	Appearances	Rk	Rank	Ref	Reference	Cap No.	Water polo cap number
Pos	Playing position	FP	Field player	GK	Goalkeeper	ISHOF	International Swimming Hall of Fame
L/R	Handedness	L	Left-handed	R	Right-handed	Oly debut	Olympic debut in water polo
(C)	Captain	p.	page	pp.	pages		

== Team statistics ==
=== Comprehensive results by tournament ===
Notes:

- Results of Olympic qualification tournaments are not included. Numbers refer to the final placing of each team at the respective Games.
- At the 1904 Summer Olympics, a water polo tournament was contested, but only American contestants participated. Currently the International Olympic Committee (IOC) and the International Swimming Federation (FINA) consider water polo event as part of unofficial program in 1904.
- Last updated: 5 May 2021.

Legend

- 1 – Champions
- 2 – Runners-up
- 3 – Third place
- 4 – Fourth place
- — – The nation did not participate in the Games
- Q – Qualified for forthcoming tournament
- – Hosts

Men's team	00	04	08	12	20	24	28	32	36	48	52	56	60	64	68	72	76	80	84	88	92	96	00	04	08	12	16	20	Years
Italy		—			10	11				1	3	4	1	4	4	6	2	8	7	7	1	3	5	8	9	2	3	Q	21
Total teams	7		4	6	12	13	14	5	16	18	21	10	16	13	15	16	12	12	12	12	12	12	12	12	12	12	12	12	

=== Number of appearances ===
Last updated: 27 July 2021.

Legend

- Year^{*} – As host team

Men's team	Apps	Record streak	Active streak	Debut	Most recent	Best finish	Confederation
Italy	21	19	19	1920	2020	Champions	Europe – LEN

=== Best finishes ===
Last updated: 27 July 2021.

Legend

- Year^{*} – As host team

Men's team	Best finish	Apps	Confederation
Italy	Champions (1948, 1960^{*}, 1992)	21	Europe – LEN

=== Finishes in the top four ===
Last updated: 5 May 2021.

Legend

- Year^{*} – As host team

Men's team	Total	Champions	Runners-up	Third place	Fourth place	First	Last
Italy	13	3 (1948, 1960^{*}, 1992)	2 (1976, 2012)	3 (1952, 1996, 2016)	3 (1956, 1964, 1968)	1948	2016

=== Medal table ===
Last updated: 5 May 2021.

Men's team	Gold	Silver	Bronze	Total
Italy (ITA)	3	2	3	8

== Player statistics ==
=== Multiple appearances ===
The following table is pre-sorted by number of Olympic appearances (in descending order), year of the last Olympic appearance (in ascending order), year of the first Olympic appearance (in ascending order), date of birth (in ascending order), name of the player (in ascending order), respectively.

- Number of six-time Olympians: 0
- Number of five-time Olympians: 3
- Number of four-time Olympians: 7
- Last updated: 27 July 2021.

Legend and abbreviation

- – Hosts
- AUS – Australia
- ITA – Italy

Male athletes who competed in water polo at four or more Olympics
Apps	Player	Birth	Pos	Water polo tournaments					Age of first/last	ISHOF member	Note	Ref
Apps	Player	Birth	Pos	1	2	3	4	5	Age of first/last	ISHOF member	Note	Ref
5	Gianni De Magistris	1950	FP	1968	1972	1976	1980	1984	17/33	1995		
5	Stefano Tempesti	1979	GK	2000	2004	2008	2012	2016	21/37			
5	Pietro Figlioli	1984	FP	2004; AUS	2008; AUS	2012; ITA	2016; ITA	2020; ITA	20/37			
4	Eraldo Pizzo	1938	FP	1960	1964	1968	1972		22/34	1990		
4	Franco Lavoratori	1941	FP	1960	1964	1968	1972		19/31			
4	Alberto Alberani	1947	GK	1968	1972	1976	1980		21/33			
4	Carlo Silipo	1971	FP	1992	1996	2000	2004		20/32	2014		
4	Alberto Angelini	1974	FP	1996	2000	2004	2008		21/33			
4	Alessandro Calcaterra	1975	FP	1996	2000	2004	2008		21/33			
4	Fabio Bencivenga	1976	FP	1996	2000	2004	2008		20/32			

=== Multiple medalists ===
The following table is pre-sorted by total number of Olympic medals (in descending order), number of Olympic gold medals (in descending order), number of Olympic silver medals (in descending order), year of receiving the last Olympic medal (in ascending order), year of receiving the first Olympic medal (in ascending order), name of the player (in ascending order), respectively.

- Number of four-time Olympic medalists: 0
- Number of three-time Olympic medalists: 0
- Last updated: 1 May 2021.

=== Top goalscorers ===
The following table is pre-sorted by number of total goals (in descending order), year of the last Olympic appearance (in ascending order), year of the first Olympic appearance (in ascending order), name of the player (in ascending order), respectively.

- Number of goalscorers (50+ goals): 2
- Number of goalscorers (40–49 goals): 2
- Number of goalscorers (30–39 goals): 4
- Last updated: 1 April 2021.

Legend and abbreviation

- – Hosts
- AUS – Australia
- ITA – Italy

Male players with 30 or more goals at the Olympics
Rk	Player	Birth	L/R	Total goals	Water polo tournaments (goals)					Age of first/last	ISHOF member	Note	Ref
Rk	Player	Birth	L/R	Total goals	1	2	3	4	5	Age of first/last	ISHOF member	Note	Ref
1	Gianni De Magistris	1950	Right	59	1968 (6)	1972 (11)	1976 (11)	1980 (20)	1984 (11)	17/33	1995		
2	Eraldo Pizzo	1938	Right	53	1960 (7)	1964 (5)	1968 (29)	1972 (12)		22/34			
3	Pietro Figlioli	1984	Right	47	2004; AUS (8)	2008; AUS (16)	2012; ITA (9)	2016; ITA (14)		20/32			
4	Alessandro Calcaterra	1975	Right	46	1996 (5)	2000 (9)	2004 (5)	2008 (27)		21/33			
5	Alberto Angelini	1974	Right	35	1996 (11)	2000 (4)	2004 (11)	2008 (9)		21/33			
6	Maurizio Felugo	1981	Right	34	2004 (6)	2008 (16)	2012 (12)			23/31			
7	Valentino Gallo	1985	Left	33	2008 (15)	2012 (10)	2016 (8)			23/31			
8	Leonardo Sottani	1973	Left	30	1996 (8)	2000 (11)		2008 (11)		22/34			
Rk	Player	Birth	L/R	Total goals	1	2	3	4	5	Age of first/last	ISHOF member	Note	Ref
Rk	Player	Birth	L/R	Total goals	Water polo tournaments (goals)					Age of first/last	ISHOF member	Note	Ref

Sources:

- Official Reports (PDF): 1920–1924, 1948–1996;
- Official Results Books (PDF): 2000 (pp. 47, 52, 55, 64, 68–69, 74, 76), 2004 (pp. 211–212), 2008 (pp. 205–206), 2012 (pp. 484–485), 2016 (pp. 123–124).

=== Goalkeepers ===
The following table is pre-sorted by edition of the Olympics (in ascending order), cap number or name of the goalkeeper (in ascending order), respectively.

Last updated: 27 July 2021.

Legend and abbreviation

- – Hosts
- Eff % – Save efficiency (Saves / Shots)

Year	Cap No.	Goalkeeper	Birth	Age	ISHOF member	Note	Ref
1920		Salvatore Cabella	1896	23–24		Starting goalkeeper	
1920		(Unknown)					
1924		Mario Balla	1903	20–21		Starting goalkeeper	
1924		(Unknown)					
1948 (gold)		Pasquale Buonocore	1916	32		Starting goalkeeper	
1948 (gold)		(Unknown)					
1952 (bronze)		Raffaello Gambino	1928	24			
1952 (bronze)		Renato Traiola	1924	27			
1956		Cosimo Antonelli	1925	31			
1956		Enzo Cavazzoni	1932	24			
1960 (gold)		Dante Rossi	1936	24			
1960 (gold)		Brunello Spinelli	1939	21			
1964		Eugenio Merello	1940	24			
1964		Dante Rossi (2)	1936	28			
1968	1	Alberto Alberani	1947	21			
1968	11	Eugenio Merello (2)	1940	28			
1972	1	Alberto Alberani (2)	1947	25			
1972	11	Ferdinando Lignano	1948	28			
1976 (silver)	1	Alberto Alberani (3)	1947	29			
1976 (silver)	11	Umberto Panerai	1953	23			
1980	1	Alberto Alberani (4)	1947	33			
1980	11	Umberto Panerai (2)	1953	27			
1984	1	Roberto Gandolfi	1956	28			
1984	13	Umberto Panerai (3)	1953	31			
1988	1	Paolo Trapanese	1962	26			
1988	13	Gianni Averaimo	1964	24			
1992 (gold)	1	Francesco Attolico	1963	29			
1992 (gold)	13	Gianni Averaimo (2)	1964	27			
Year	Cap No.	Goalkeeper	Birth	Age	ISHOF member	Note	Ref

Year	Cap No.	Goalkeeper	Birth	Age	Saves	Shots	Eff %	ISHOF member	Note	Ref
1996 (bronze)	1	Francesco Attolico (2)	1963	33	44	110	40.0%		Starting goalkeeper	
1996 (bronze)	10	Marco Gerini	1971	24	6	15	40.0%			
2000	1	Francesco Attolico (3)	1963	37	28	61	45.9%			
2000	5	Stefano Tempesti	1979	21	24	43	55.8%			
2004	1	Stefano Tempesti (2)	1979	25	50	86	58.1%		Starting goalkeeper	
2004	5	Marco Gerini (2)	1971	33	0	4	0.0%			
2008	1	Stefano Tempesti (3)	1979	29	83	169	49.1%		Starting goalkeeper	
2008	13	Fabio Violetti	1974	34	0	0	—			
2012 (silver)	1	Stefano Tempesti (4)	1979	33	87	147	59.2%		Starting goalkeeper	
2012 (silver)	13	Giacomo Pastorino	1980	32	0	0	—			
2016 (bronze)	1	Stefano Tempesti (5)	1979	37	51	101	50.5%		Starting goalkeeper	
2016 (bronze)	13	Marco Del Lungo	1990	26	21	37	56.8%			
2020	1	Marco Del Lungo (2)	1990	31						
2020	13	Gianmarco Nicosia	1998	23						
Year	Cap No.	Goalkeeper	Birth	Age	Saves	Shots	Eff %	ISHOF member	Note	Ref

Sources:

- Official Reports (PDF): 1996 (pp. 62–66, 70, 72–73);
- Official Results Books (PDF): 2000 (pp. 47, 52, 55, 64, 68–69, 74, 76), 2004 (pp. 211–212), 2008 (pp. 205–206), 2012 (pp. 484–485), 2016 (pp. 123–124).

=== Top sprinters ===
The following table is pre-sorted by number of total sprints won (in descending order), year of the last Olympic appearance (in ascending order), year of the first Olympic appearance (in ascending order), name of the sprinter (in ascending order), respectively.

* Number of sprinters (30+ sprints won, since 2000): 1

- Number of sprinters (20–29 sprints won, since 2000): 0
- Number of sprinters (10–19 sprints won, since 2000): 4
- Number of sprinters (5–9 sprints won, since 2000): 0
- Last updated: 15 May 2021.

Legend and abbreviation

- – Hosts
- Eff % – Efficiency (Sprints won / Sprints contested)
- AUS – Australia
- ITA – Italy

Male players with 5 or more sprints won at the Olympics (statistics since 2000)
Rk	Sprinter	Birth	Total sprints won	Total sprints contested	Eff %	Water polo tournaments (sprints won / contested)					Age of first/last	ISHOF member	Note	Ref
Rk	Sprinter	Birth	Total sprints won	Total sprints contested	Eff %	1	2	3	4	5	Age of first/last	ISHOF member	Note	Ref
1	Pietro Figlioli	1984	78	86	90.7%	2004; AUS (24/27)	2008; AUS (21/23)	2012; ITA (19/21)	2016; ITA (14/15)		20/32			
2	Francesco Di Fulvio	1993	16	17	94.1%	2016 (16/17)					23/23			
3	Goran Fiorentini	1981	15	22	68.2%	2004 (15/22)					22/22			
4	Alberto Ghibellini	1973	10	16	62.5%	1996 (N/A)	2000 (10/16)				23/27			
4	Deni Fiorentini	1984	10	10	100.0%	2012 (10/10)					28/28			

- Official Results Books (PDF): 2000 (pp. 47, 52, 55, 64, 68–69, 74, 76), 2004 (pp. 211–212), 2008 (pp. 205–206), 2012 (pp. 484–485), 2016 (pp. 123–124).

== Coach statistics ==
=== Medals as coach and player ===
The following table is pre-sorted by total number of Olympic medals (in descending order), number of Olympic gold medals (in descending order), number of Olympic silver medals (in descending order), year of winning the last Olympic medal (in ascending order), year of winning the first Olympic medal (in ascending order), name of the person (in ascending order), respectively. Last updated: 5 May 2021.

As a water polo player, Ratko Rudić won a silver medal for Yugoslavia at the 1980 Summer Olympics. He led Italy men's national water polo team to win two Olympic medals in 1992 and 1996.

Italian Alessandro Campagna won a gold medal at the Barcelona Olympics in 1992, coached by Ratko Rudić. As a head coach, he guided Italy men's national team to two medals in 2012 and 2016.

Legend

- Year^{*} – As host team

Rk	Person	Birth	Height	Player				Head coach			Total medals				Ref
Rk	Person	Birth	Height	Age	Men's team	Pos	Medal	Age	Men's team	Medal	G	S	B	T	Ref
1	Ratko Rudić	1948	1.88 m (6 ft 2 in)	32	Yugoslavia	FP	1980 (silver)	44–48	Italy	1992 (gold) , 1996 (bronze)	1	1	1	3	
1	Alessandro Campagna	1963	1.82 m (6 ft 0 in)	29	Italy	FP	1992 (gold)	49–53	Italy	2012 (silver) , 2016 (bronze)	1	1	1	3	
3	Gianni Lonzi	1938	1.82 m (6 ft 0 in)	22	Italy	FP	1960^{*} (gold)	37	Italy	1976 (silver)	1	1	0	2	
4	Mario Majoni	1910		38	Italy	FP	1948^{*} (gold)	42	Italy	1952 (bronze)	1	0	1	2	

== Olympic champions ==
=== 1948 Summer Olympics ===
- Edition of men's tournament: 10th
- Host city: London, United Kingdom
- Number of participating teams: 18
- Competition format: Series of round-robin elimination pools, followed by round-robin semi-final pools, and then round-robin final pools
- Champion: Italy (1st title; 1st place in round one D group; 1st place in round two I group; 1st place in semi-final L group; 1st place in final group)

Match	Round	Date	Opponent	Result	Goals for	Goals against	Goal diff.	Note
Match 1/7	Round one – Group D	30 July 1948	Australia	Won	9	0	9	
Match 2/7	Round one – Group D	30 July 1948	Yugoslavia	~~Won~~	~~4~~	~~2~~	~~2~~	The match result was annulled and ordered to be replayed. (Note: At the 1948 Olympics, the water polo match between Italy and Yugoslavia in Group D, and the match between Egypt and Hungary in Group E were both replayed. For more details, please see here.)
Replay 2/7	Round one – Group D	1 August 1948	Yugoslavia	Drawn	4	4	0	Replay of Match 2/7
Match 3/7	Round two – Group I	2 August 1948	Hungary	Won	4	3	1	
Match 4/7	Semi-final round – Group L	4 August 1948	Egypt	Won	5	1	4	
Match 5/7	Semi-final round – Group L	5 August 1948	France	Won	5	2	3	
Match 6/7	Final round – Group	6 August 1948	Belgium	Won	4	2	2	
Match 7/7	Final round – Group	7 August 1948	Netherlands	Won	4	2	2	
Total	Matches played: 7 • Wins: 6 • Ties: 1 • Defeats: 0 • Win %: 85.7%				35	14	21	Note

Source: Official Reports (PDF): 1948 (pp. 643, 645, 646).

- Head coach: (Italy) Giuseppe Valle (1st title as head coach)

Roster
#	Player	Pos	Height	Weight	Date of birth	Age of winning gold	Oly debut	ISHOF member
P1	Gildo Arena	FP			25 February 1921	27 years, 164 days	Yes	
P2	Emilio Bulgarelli	FP			15 February 1917	31 years, 174 days	Yes	
P3	Pasquale Buonocore	GK			17 May 1916	32 years, 82 days	Yes	
P4	Aldo Ghira	FP			4 April 1920	28 years, 125 days	Yes	
P5	Mario Majoni	FP			27 May 1910	38 years, 72 days	Yes	1972
P6	Geminio Ognio	FP			13 December 1917	30 years, 238 days	Yes	
P7	Gianfranco Pandolfini	FP			16 September 1920	27 years, 326 days	Yes	
P8	Tullio Pandolfini	FP			6 August 1914	34 years, 1 day	Yes	
P9	Cesare Rubini	FP			2 November 1923	24 years, 279 days	Yes	2000
Average					17 January 1918	30 years, 203 days		
Coach	Giuseppe Valle				15 March 1904	44 years, 145 days		

Note: Gianfranco Pandolfini and Tullio Pandolfini are brothers.
Sources:

- Official Reports (PDF): 1948 (pp. 643, 645, 646);
- Olympedia: 1948 (men's tournament);
- Sports Reference: 1948 (men's tournament);
- ISHOF.

=== 1960 Summer Olympics ===
- Edition of men's tournament: 13th
- Host city: Rome, Italy
- Number of participating teams: 16
- Competition format: Round-robin pools advanced teams to the round-robin semi-final pool; round-robin semi-final pools advanced teams to the round-robin final pool
- Champion: Italy (2nd title; 1st place in preliminary A group; 1st place in semi-final A group; 1st place in final group)

Match	Round	Date	Opponent	Result	Goals for	Goals against	Goal diff.
Match 1/7	Preliminary round – Group A	25 August 1960	Romania	Won	4	3	1
Match 2/7	Preliminary round – Group A	26 August 1960	Japan	Won	8	1	7
Match 3/7	Preliminary round – Group A	27 August 1960	Egypt	Won	9	4	5
Match 4/7	Semi-final round – Group A	30 August 1960	United Team of Germany	Won	3	0	3
Match 5/7	Semi-final round – Group A	31 August 1960	Soviet Union	Won	2	0	2
Match 6/7	Final round – Group	2 September 1960	Yugoslavia	Won	2	1	1
Match 7/7	Final round – Group	3 September 1960	Hungary	Drawn	3	3	0
Total	Matches played: 7 • Wins: 6 • Ties: 1 • Defeats: 0 • Win %: 85.7%				31	12	19

Source: Official Reports (PDF): 1960 (pp. 618, 619, 627, 628, 631).

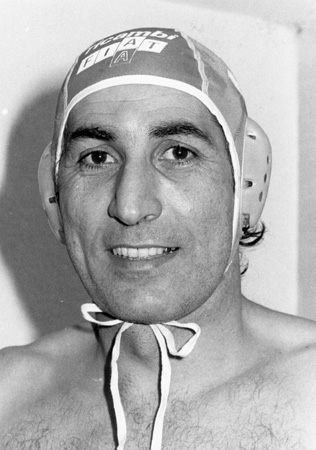
Eraldo Pizzo scored 7 goals at the 1960 Olympics, helping Italy win gold.

- Head coach: (Hungary) Andres Zolyomy (1st title as head coach)

Roster
#	Player	Pos	Height	Weight	Date of birth	Age of winning gold	Oly debut	Goals	ISHOF member
P1	Amedeo Ambron	FP	1.74 m (5 ft 9 in)	77 kg (170 lb)	23 January 1939	21 years, 224 days	Yes	1	
P2	Danio Bardi	FP	1.80 m (5 ft 11 in)	76 kg (168 lb)	23 May 1937	23 years, 103 days	Yes	2	
P3	Giuseppe D'Altrui	FP	1.85 m (6 ft 1 in)	82 kg (181 lb)	7 April 1934	26 years, 149 days	No	1	2010
P4	Salvatore Gionta	FP	1.82 m (6 ft 0 in)	81 kg (179 lb)	22 December 1930	29 years, 256 days	No	2	
P5	Giancarlo Guerrini	FP	1.81 m (5 ft 11 in)	72 kg (159 lb)	29 December 1939	20 years, 249 days	Yes	3	
P6	Franco Lavoratori	FP	1.80 m (5 ft 11 in)	78 kg (172 lb)	15 March 1941	19 years, 172 days	Yes	4	
P7	Gianni Lonzi	FP	1.82 m (6 ft 0 in)	74 kg (163 lb)	4 August 1938	22 years, 30 days	Yes	0	2009
P8	Luigi Mannelli	FP	1.85 m (6 ft 1 in)	96 kg (212 lb)	21 February 1939	21 years, 195 days	No	4	
P9	Rosario Parmegiani	FP	1.74 m (5 ft 9 in)	77 kg (170 lb)	12 March 1937	23 years, 175 days	Yes	7	
P10	Eraldo Pizzo	FP	1.87 m (6 ft 2 in)	84 kg (185 lb)	21 April 1938	22 years, 135 days	Yes	7	1990
P11	Dante Rossi	GK	1.91 m (6 ft 3 in)	89 kg (196 lb)	28 August 1936	24 years, 6 days	Yes	0	
P12	Brunello Spinelli	GK	1.82 m (6 ft 0 in)	82 kg (181 lb)	26 May 1939	21 years, 100 days	Yes	0	
Average			1.82 m (6 ft 0 in)	81 kg (179 lb)	6 September 1937	22 years, 363 days	Total	31	
Coach	Andres Zolyomy								2010

Sources:

- Official Reports (PDF): 1960 (pp. 618, 619, 627, 628, 631);
- Olympedia: 1960 (men's tournament);
- Sports Reference: 1960 (men's tournament);
- ISHOF.

=== 1992 Summer Olympics ===
- Edition of men's tournament: 21st
- Host city: Barcelona, Spain
- Number of participating teams: 12
- Competition format: Round-robin pools advanced teams to classification matches
- Champion: Italy (3rd title; 2nd place in preliminary B group)

Match	Round	Date	Opponent	Result	Goals for	Goals against	Goal diff.
Match 1/7	Preliminary round – Group B	1 August 1992	Hungary	Drawn	7	7	0
Match 2/7	Preliminary round – Group B	2 August 1992	Netherlands	Won	6	4	2
Match 3/7	Preliminary round – Group B	3 August 1992	Cuba	Won	11	8	3
Match 4/7	Preliminary round – Group B	5 August 1992	Spain	Drawn	9	9	0
Match 5/7	Preliminary round – Group B	6 August 1992	Greece	Won	8	6	2
Match 6/7	Semi-finals	8 August 1992	(International Olympic Committee) Unified Team (Note: In 1992, 12 of the 15 former Soviet Republics competed together as the Unified Team and marched under the Olympic Flag in the Barcelona Games.)	Won	9	8	1
Match 7/7	Gold medal match	9 August 1992	Spain	Won	9	8	1
Total	Matches played: 7 • Wins: 5 • Ties: 2 • Defeats: 0 • Win %: 71.4%				59	50	9

Source: Official Reports (PDF): 1992 (pp. 391, 392, 393, 394, 395, 399, 400).

- Head coach: (Croatia) Ratko Rudić (3rd title as head coach)
- Assistant coach: (Italy) Giuseppe Castellucci

Roster
Cap No.	Player	Pos	L/R	Height	Weight	Date of birth	Age of winning gold	Oly debut	ISHOF member
1	Francesco Attolico	GK		1.93 m (6 ft 4 in)	85 kg (187 lb)	23 March 1963	29 years, 139 days	Yes	
2	Marco D'Altrui	FP		1.80 m (5 ft 11 in)	72 kg (159 lb)	25 April 1964	28 years, 106 days	No	2010
3	Alessandro Bovo	FP		1.85 m (6 ft 1 in)	78 kg (172 lb)	1 January 1969	23 years, 221 days	Yes	
4	Pino Porzio	FP				26 February 1967	25 years, 165 days	Yes	
5	Sandro Campagna	FP	R	1.82 m (6 ft 0 in)	80 kg (176 lb)	26 June 1963	29 years, 44 days	No	2019
6	Paolo Caldarella	FP		1.87 m (6 ft 2 in)	88 kg (194 lb)	20 September 1964	27 years, 324 days	No	
7	Mario Fiorillo	FP		1.79 m (5 ft 10 in)	70 kg (154 lb)	16 December 1962	29 years, 237 days	No	
8	Francesco Porzio	FP	L	1.85 m (6 ft 1 in)	83 kg (183 lb)	26 January 1966	26 years, 196 days	No	
9	Amedeo Pomilio	FP	L	1.78 m (5 ft 10 in)	74 kg (163 lb)	11 February 1967	25 years, 180 days	Yes	
10	Ferdinando Gandolfi	FP				5 January 1967	25 years, 217 days	Yes	
11	Massimiliano Ferretti	FP		1.94 m (6 ft 4 in)	85 kg (187 lb)	22 June 1966	26 years, 48 days	No	
12	Carlo Silipo	FP	R	1.99 m (6 ft 6 in)	95 kg (209 lb)	10 September 1971	20 years, 334 days	Yes	
13	Gianni Averaimo	GK		1.83 m (6 ft 0 in)	84 kg (185 lb)	10 September 1964	27 years, 334 days	No	
Average				1.86 m (6 ft 1 in) (Note: Average height of 11 players.)	81 kg (179 lb) (Note: Average weight of 11 players.)	29 December 1965	26 years, 224 days		
Coach	Ratko Rudić			1.88 m (6 ft 2 in)		7 June 1948	44 years, 63 days		2007

Note: Francesco Porzio and Pino Porzio are brothers.
Sources:

- Official Reports (PDF): 1992 (pp. 391, 392, 393, 394, 395, 399, 400);
- Olympedia: 1992 (men's tournament);
- Sports Reference: 1992 (men's tournament);
- ISHOF.

Statistics
Cap No.	Player	Pos	Matches played	Goals/Shots		
Cap No.	Player	Pos	Matches played	Goals	Shots	%
1	Francesco Attolico	GK	7			
2	Marco D'Altrui	FP	7	3	8	37.5%
3	Alessandro Bovo	FP	7	1	8	12.5%
4	Pino Porzio	FP	7	3	11	27.3%
5	Sandro Campagna	FP	7	6	14	42.9%
6	Paolo Caldarella	FP	7	6	14	42.9%
7	Mario Fiorillo	FP	7	4	13	30.8%
8	Francesco Porzio	FP	7	10	27	37.0%
9	Amedeo Pomilio	FP	7	3	10	30.0%
10	Ferdinando Gandolfi	FP	7	6	15	40.0%
11	Massimiliano Ferretti	FP	7	14	34	41.2%
12	Carlo Silipo	FP	7	3	15	20.0%
13	Gianni Averaimo	GK	7			
Total			8	59	169	34.9%
Against				50	172	29.1%

Source: Official Reports (PDF): 1992 (pp. 391, 392, 393, 394, 395, 399, 400).

== See also ==
- Italy women's Olympic water polo team records and statistics
- List of men's Olympic water polo tournament records and statistics
- Lists of Olympic water polo records and statistics
- Italy at the Olympics

== Sources ==
=== Official Reports (IOC) ===
PDF documents in the LA84 Foundation Digital Library:

- Official Report of the 1896 Olympic Games (download, archive)
- Official Report of the 1900 Olympic Games (download, archive)
- Official Report of the 1904 Olympic Games (download, archive)
- Official Report of the 1908 Olympic Games (download, archive) (pp. 359–361)
- Official Report of the 1912 Olympic Games (download, archive) (pp. 1021–1024, 1031–1037)
- Official Report of the 1920 Olympic Games (download, archive) (p. 130)
- Official Report of the 1924 Olympic Games (download, archive) (pp. 439–440, 486–494)
- Official Report of the 1928 Olympic Games (download, archive) (pp. 746–757, 797–807)
- Official Report of the 1932 Olympic Games (download, archive) (pp. 619–623, 646–652)
- Official Report of the 1936 Olympic Games, v.2 (download, archive) (pp. 345–356)
- Official Report of the 1948 Olympic Games (download, archive) (pp. 537–540, 640–647)
- Official Report of the 1952 Olympic Games (download, archive) (pp. 600–608)
- Official Report of the 1956 Olympic Games (download, archive) (pp. 592–594, 624–627)
- Official Report of the 1960 Olympic Games (download, archive) (pp. 552–555, 617–634)
- Official Report of the 1964 Olympic Games, v.2 (download, archive) (pp. 682–698)
- Official Report of the 1968 Olympic Games, v.3 (download, archive) (pp. 449–466, 811–826)
- Official Report of the 1972 Olympic Games, v.3 (download, archive) (pp. 331, 353–365)
- Official Report of the 1976 Olympic Games, v.3 (download, archive) (pp. 446–447, 484–497)
- Official Report of the 1980 Olympic Games, v.3 (download, archive) (pp. 458, 495–510)
- Official Report of the 1984 Olympic Games, v.2 (download, archive) (pp. 528–534)
- Official Report of the 1988 Olympic Games, v.2 (download, archive) (pp. 590–598)
- Official Report of the 1992 Olympic Games, v.5 (download, archive) (pp. 354, 386–400)
- Official Report of the 1996 Olympic Games, v.3 (download, archive) (pp. 56–73)

=== Official Results Books (IOC) ===
PDF documents in the LA84 Foundation Digital Library:

- Official Results Book – 2000 Olympic Games – Water Polo (download, archive)
- Official Results Book – 2004 Olympic Games – Water Polo (download, archive)
- Official Results Book – 2008 Olympic Games – Water Polo (download, archive)

PDF documents on the FINA website:

- Official Results Book – 2012 Olympic Games – Diving, Swimming, Synchronised Swimming, Water Polo (archive) (pp. 284–507)

PDF documents in the Olympic World Library:

- Official Results Book – 2016 Olympic Games – Water Polo (archive)

PDF documents on the International Olympic Committee website:

- Official Results Book – 2020 Olympic Games – Water Polo (archive)
- Official Results Book – 2024 Olympic Games – Water Polo

=== Official Reports (FINA) ===
PDF documents on the FINA website:

- HistoFINA – Water polo medalists and statistics (as of September 2019) (archive) (pp. 4–13)
- 1870–2020 | 150 years of Water Polo – Evolution of its rules (archive)

=== Official website (IOC) ===
Water polo on the International Olympic Committee website:

- Water polo
- Men's water polo

=== Olympedia ===
Water polo on the Olympedia website:

- Water polo Archived 2021-12-28 at the Wayback Machine
- Men's water polo
- Athlete count for water polo
- Water polo venues
- Water polo at the 1900 Summer Olympics (men's tournament)
- Water polo at the 1904 Summer Olympics (men's tournament)
- Water polo at the 1908 Summer Olympics (men's tournament)
- Water polo at the 1912 Summer Olympics (men's tournament)
- Water polo at the 1920 Summer Olympics (men's tournament)
- Water polo at the 1924 Summer Olympics (men's tournament)
- Water polo at the 1928 Summer Olympics (men's tournament)
- Water polo at the 1932 Summer Olympics (men's tournament)
- Water polo at the 1936 Summer Olympics (men's tournament)
- Water polo at the 1948 Summer Olympics (men's tournament)
- Water polo at the 1952 Summer Olympics (men's tournament)
- Water polo at the 1956 Summer Olympics (men's tournament)
- Water polo at the 1960 Summer Olympics (men's tournament)
- Water polo at the 1964 Summer Olympics (men's tournament)
- Water polo at the 1968 Summer Olympics (men's tournament)
- Water polo at the 1972 Summer Olympics (men's tournament)
- Water polo at the 1976 Summer Olympics (men's tournament)
- Water polo at the 1980 Summer Olympics (men's tournament)
- Water polo at the 1984 Summer Olympics (men's tournament)
- Water polo at the 1988 Summer Olympics (men's tournament)
- Water polo at the 1992 Summer Olympics (men's tournament)
- Water polo at the 1996 Summer Olympics (men's tournament)
- Water polo at the 2000 Summer Olympics (men's tournament)
- Water polo at the 2004 Summer Olympics (men's tournament)
- Water polo at the 2008 Summer Olympics (men's tournament)
- Water polo at the 2012 Summer Olympics (men's tournament)
- Water polo at the 2016 Summer Olympics (men's tournament)
- Water polo at the 2020 Summer Olympics (men's tournament)

=== Sports Reference ===
Water polo on the Sports Reference website:

- Country Medal Leaders & Athlete Medal Leaders (1900–2016) (archived)
- Men's water polo (1900–2016) (archived)
- Water polo at the 1900 Summer Games (men's tournament) (archived)
- Water polo at the 1904 Summer Games (men's tournament) (archived)
- Water polo at the 1908 Summer Games (men's tournament) (archived)
- Water polo at the 1912 Summer Games (men's tournament) (archived)
- Water polo at the 1920 Summer Games (men's tournament) (archived)
- Water polo at the 1924 Summer Games (men's tournament) (archived)
- Water polo at the 1928 Summer Games (men's tournament) (archived)
- Water polo at the 1932 Summer Games (men's tournament) (archived)
- Water polo at the 1936 Summer Games (men's tournament) (archived)
- Water polo at the 1948 Summer Games (men's tournament) (archived)
- Water polo at the 1952 Summer Games (men's tournament) (archived)
- Water polo at the 1956 Summer Games (men's tournament) (archived)
- Water polo at the 1960 Summer Games (men's tournament) (archived)
- Water polo at the 1964 Summer Games (men's tournament) (archived)
- Water polo at the 1968 Summer Games (men's tournament) (archived)
- Water polo at the 1972 Summer Games (men's tournament) (archived)
- Water polo at the 1976 Summer Games (men's tournament) (archived)
- Water polo at the 1980 Summer Games (men's tournament) (archived)
- Water polo at the 1984 Summer Games (men's tournament) (archived)
- Water polo at the 1988 Summer Games (men's tournament) (archived)
- Water polo at the 1992 Summer Games (men's tournament) (archived)
- Water polo at the 1996 Summer Games (men's tournament) (archived)
- Water polo at the 2000 Summer Games (men's tournament) (archived)
- Water polo at the 2004 Summer Games (men's tournament) (archived)
- Water polo at the 2008 Summer Games (men's tournament) (archived)
- Water polo at the 2012 Summer Games (men's tournament) (archived)
- Water polo at the 2016 Summer Games (men's tournament) (archived)
- Water polo at the 2020 Summer Games (men's tournament) (archived)

=== Todor66 ===
Water polo on the Todor66 website:

- Water polo at the Summer Games
- Water polo at the 1900 Summer Olympics (men's tournament)
- Water polo at the 1904 Summer Olympics (men's tournament)
- Water polo at the 1908 Summer Olympics (men's tournament)
- Water polo at the 1912 Summer Olympics (men's tournament)
- Water polo at the 1920 Summer Olympics (men's tournament)
- Water polo at the 1924 Summer Olympics (men's tournament)
- Water polo at the 1928 Summer Olympics (men's tournament)
- Water polo at the 1932 Summer Olympics (men's tournament)
- Water polo at the 1936 Summer Olympics (men's tournament)
- Water polo at the 1948 Summer Olympics (men's tournament)
- Water polo at the 1952 Summer Olympics (men's tournament)
- Water polo at the 1956 Summer Olympics (men's tournament)
- Water polo at the 1960 Summer Olympics (men's tournament)
- Water polo at the 1964 Summer Olympics (men's tournament)
- Water polo at the 1968 Summer Olympics (men's tournament, men's qualification)
- Water polo at the 1972 Summer Olympics (men's tournament, men's qualification)
- Water polo at the 1976 Summer Olympics (men's tournament, men's European qualification)
- Water polo at the 1980 Summer Olympics (men's tournament, men's European qualification, men's world qualification)
- Water polo at the 1984 Summer Olympics (men's tournament, men's qualification)
- Water polo at the 1988 Summer Olympics (men's tournament, men's qualification)
- Water polo at the 1992 Summer Olympics (men's tournament, men's qualification)
- Water polo at the 1996 Summer Olympics (men's tournament, men's qualification)
- Water polo at the 2000 Summer Olympics (men's tournament, men's qualification)
- Water polo at the 2004 Summer Olympics (men's tournament, men's qualification)
- Water polo at the 2008 Summer Olympics (men's tournament, men's qualification)
- Water polo at the 2012 Summer Olympics (men's tournament, men's qualification)
- Water polo at the 2016 Summer Olympics (men's tournament, men's qualification)
- Water polo at the 2020 Summer Olympics (men's tournament, men's qualification)
- Water polo at the 2024 Summer Olympics (men's tournament, men's qualification)

=== ISHOF ===
International Swimming Hall of Fame (ISHOF) website:

- Honorees Listed by Category – Water Polo
- Honorees Listed by Category – Coaches
- Honorees Listed by Category – Contributors
- Honorees by Country
- Honorees By Last Name
