= Sportiva Nervi =

Water polo club in Italy

- Founded: 1932; 94 years ago
- Based in: Nervi, Genoa, Italy
- Stadium: Piscina Gropallo, Nervi
- Colors
- Website: www.sportivanervi.it

Sportiva Nervi is an Italian water polo club from Nervi (Genoa) in Liguria founded in 1932.

== History ==
Sportiva Nervi was founded in 1932 as Dopolavoro Caprafico. The men's team of Sportiva Nervi competed for the first time in Serie A from the season 1957.
The club competed in Serie A until 1963. In those years, athletes of great technical value play in the Sportiva Nervi such as goalkeeper Dante Rossi, who participated at 1960 Summer Olympics in Rome, winning the gold medal with the Italy men's national water polo team.
The club achieved its best results in Serie A from 1967 to 1969, obtaining 3 consecutive runners-up behind the Pro Recco. The men's team of Sportiva Nervi competed in Serie A until 1983 then in the following season competed in Serie A2.

== Honours ==
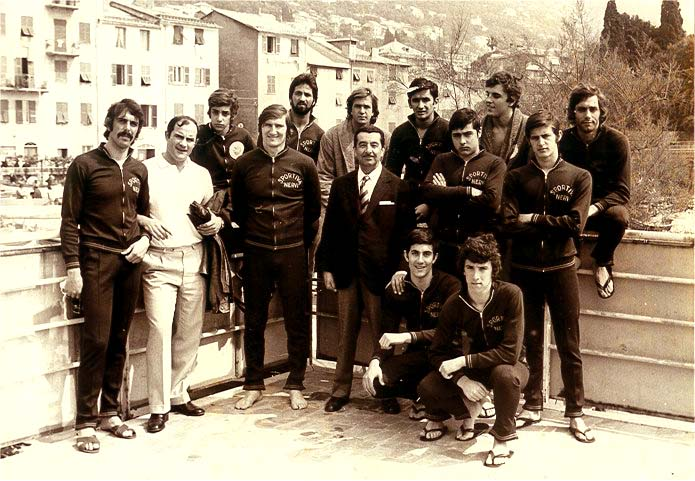
Sportiva Nervi men's water polo team 1970

- Men
  - Italian League
    - Runners-up (3): 1967, 1968, 1969
    - Third Place (3): 1966, 1970, 1973
  - Coppa Italia
    - Third Place (1): 2005
  - Italian Championship Under-20 Serie B (Nord)
    - Winners (1): 1990
  - Italian Championship Under-17 A
    - Winners (7): 1962, 1971, 1974, 1975, 1982, 1983, 1994
  - Italian Championship Under-15
    - Winners (1): 2005
  - Italian Championship Under-20
    - Winners (8): 1952, 1959, 1963, 1971, 1974, 1977, 1978, 2011

== Famous players ==
- (Italy) Dante Rossi
- (Socialist Federal Republic of Yugoslavia) Milivoj Bebić
- (United States) Merrill Moses

== Famous coaches ==
- (Italy) Massimiliano Ferretti
