= Giuseppe Valle =

Giuseppe Valle may refer to:

- Giuseppe Valle (water polo)
- Giuseppe Valle (general)
