= Luca Gualco =

Personal information
- Born: May 11, 1981 (age 45) Genoa, Italy

Sport
- Sport: Water polo
- Club: Pro Recco

Luca Gualco (born May 11, 1981) is a former professional athlete and entrepreneur. He played Water Polo for the Italian youth and main national team and for the club team Pro Recco as a center defender from 1995 to 2003. He won the LEN Champions League with Pro Recco both as a player and as a member of the board, in 2003 and 2010, respectively. His style of playing is said to be very similar to that of Franco Lavoratori, his coach and mentor.

== Life and career ==
In 2005, he started Ferrari Financial Services that was later acquired by Fiat Chrysler. The company reached half a billion revenues in 2010.

In 2012, he graduated from Stanford with an MBA. Later that year he joined Uber and led the effort to launch International Markets.

In 2016, Luca co-founded The Because Market, a direct-to-consumer company selling personal hygiene products aimed at older adults.
