= Roberto Gandolfi =

Italian water polo player

Personal information
- Nationality: Italian
- Born: 14 July 1956; Genoa, Italy
- Died: 17 February 2018 (aged 61); Armação dos Búzios, Rio de Janeiro, Brazil
- Height: 1.87 m (6 ft 2 in)
- Weight: 78 kg (172 lb)

Sport
- Sport: Water polo
- Club: Sportiva Nervi; RN Bogliasco

Roberto Gandolfi (14 July 1956 – 17 February 2018) was an Italian water polo player. He competed in the men's tournament at the 1984 Summer Olympics.

== Personal life ==
Gandolfi was son of Renato Gandolfi, second goalkeeper of the Grande Torino and one of the only two survivors who escaped the Superga air disaster.

== See also ==
- Italy men's Olympic water polo team records and statistics
- List of men's Olympic water polo tournament goalkeepers
