= Ferdinando Lignano =

Italian water polo player

Personal information
- Nationality: Italian
- Born: 13 August 1948 (age 76); Naples, Italy

Sport
- Sport: Water polo

Ferdinando Lignano (born 13 August 1948) is an Italian former water polo player. He competed in the men's tournament at the 1972 Summer Olympics.

== See also ==
- Italy men's Olympic water polo team records and statistics
- List of men's Olympic water polo tournament goalkeepers
