= Salvatore Cabella =

Italian water polo player

Personal information
- Nationality: Italian
- Born: 21 October 1896; Sampierdarena, Italy
- Died: 11 May 1965 (aged 68); Genoa, Italy

Sport
- Sport: Water polo

Salvatore Cabella (21 October 1896 – 11 May 1965) was an Italian water polo player. He competed in the men's tournament at the 1920 Summer Olympics.

== See also ==
- Italy men's Olympic water polo team records and statistics
- List of men's Olympic water polo tournament goalkeepers
