= Water polo at the 1992 Summer Olympics =

Water polo at the Games of the XXV Olympiad
- Venue: Piscina Municipal de Montjuïc; Piscines Bernat Picornell (final)
- Dates: 1–9 August 1992
- Competitors: 152 from 12 nations

Medalists
1st place, gold medalist(s)		Italy
2nd place, silver medalist(s)		Spain
3rd place, bronze medalist(s)		Unified Team

The men's water polo tournament at the 1992 Summer Olympics was held from 1 to 10 August 1992, in Barcelona, Spain. Reigning world champion Yugoslavia had qualified for the tournament, but as it had formally dissolved in the interim, it did not participate. The successor countries did not participate for several reasons. The position of Yugoslavia was replaced by Czechoslovakia.

== Qualification ==
Qualification	Date	Host	Berths	Qualified
Host nation	17 October 1986	(Switzerland) Lausanne	1	Spain
1991 World Championships	5-13 January 1991	(Australia) Perth	~~6~~ 5	~~Yugoslavia~~
1991 World Championships	5-13 January 1991	(Australia) Perth	~~6~~ 5	Hungary
1991 World Championships	5-13 January 1991	(Australia) Perth	~~6~~ 5	United States
1991 World Championships	5-13 January 1991	(Australia) Perth	~~6~~ 5	Germany
1991 World Championships	5-13 January 1991	(Australia) Perth	~~6~~ 5	Italy
1991 World Championships	5-13 January 1991	(Australia) Perth	~~6~~ 5	Unified Team
Intercontinental qualification	3-10 May 1992	(Canada) Calgary	5	Cuba Australia Greece France Netherlands
Reallocation			1	Czechoslovakia
Total			12	

== Teams ==
GROUP A

- Spain
- Cuba
- Greece
- Hungary
- Italy
- Netherlands

GROUP B

- Unified Team
- Australia
- Czechoslovakia
- France
- Germany
- United States

== Preliminary round ==
=== Group A ===
Pos	Team	Pld	W	D	L	GF	GA	GD	Pts
1	Unified Team	5	5	0	0	50	32	+18	10
2	United States	5	4	0	1	40	24	+16	8
3	Australia	5	2	1	2	44	41	+3	5
4	Germany	5	1	2	2	38	41	−3	4
5	France	5	1	1	3	38	42	−4	3
6	Czechoslovakia	5	0	0	5	33	63	−30	0

1 August 1992	Czechoslovakia	6–10	Unified team	Piscina Municipal de Montjuïc

1 August 1992	Australia	4–8	United States	Piscina Municipal de Montjuïc

1 August 1992	Germany	7–7	France	Piscina Municipal de Montjuïc

2 August 1992	Czechoslovakia	3–9	United States	Piscina Municipal de Montjuïc

2 August 1992	France	5–9	Australia	Piscina Municipal de Montjuïc

2 August 1992	Germany	7–11	Unified team	Piscina Municipal de Montjuïc

3 August 1992	United States	11–7	France	Piscina Municipal de Montjuïc

3 August 1992	Germany	15–9	Czechoslovakia	Piscina Municipal de Montjuïc

3 August 1992	Australia	9–12	Unified team	Piscina Municipal de Montjuïc

5 August 1992	Czechoslovakia	6–14	France	Piscina Municipal de Montjuïc

5 August 1992	United States	5–8	Unified team	Piscina Municipal de Montjuïc

5 August 1992	Germany	7–7	Australia	Piscina Municipal de Montjuïc

6 August 1992	Australia	15–9	Czechoslovakia	Piscina Municipal de Montjuïc

6 August 1992	United States	7–2	Germany	Piscina Municipal de Montjuïc

6 August 1992	France	5–9	Unified team	Piscina Municipal de Montjuïc

=== Group B ===
Pos	Team	Pld	W	D	L	GF	GA	GD	Pts
1	Spain	5	4	1	0	52	36	+16	9
2	Italy	5	3	2	0	41	34	+7	8
3	Hungary	5	2	2	1	49	46	+3	6
4	Cuba	5	2	0	3	50	53	−3	4
5	Netherlands	5	0	2	3	36	46	−10	2
6	Greece	5	0	1	4	32	45	−13	1

1 August 1992	Hungary	7–7	Italy	Piscina Municipal de Montjuïc

1 August 1992	Greece	9–10	Cuba	Piscina Municipal de Montjuïc

1 August 1992	Spain	12–6	Netherlands	Piscina Municipal de Montjuïc

2 August 1992	Netherlands	4–6	Italy	Piscina Municipal de Montjuïc

2 August 1992	Cuba	11–12	Hungary	Piscina Municipal de Montjuïc

2 August 1992	Spain	11–6	Greece	Piscina Municipal de Montjuïc

3 August 1992	Italy	11–8	Cuba	Piscina Municipal de Montjuïc

3 August 1992	Greece	4–4	Netherlands	Piscina Municipal de Montjuïc

3 August 1992	Hungary	5–8	Spain	Piscina Municipal de Montjuïc

5 August 1992	Netherlands	9–11	Cuba	Piscina Municipal de Montjuïc

5 August 1992	Greece	7–12	Hungary	Piscina Municipal de Montjuïc

5 August 1992	Spain	9–9	Italy	Piscina Municipal de Montjuïc

6 August 1992	Hungary	13–13	Netherlands	Piscina Municipal de Montjuïc

6 August 1992	Italy	8–6	Greece	Piscina Municipal de Montjuïc

6 August 1992	Spain	12–10	Cuba	Piscina Municipal de Montjuïc

== Final round ==
=== Group D ===
Pos	Team	Pld	W	D	L	GF	GA	GD	Pts
5	Australia	3	2	1	0	23	20	+3	5
6	Hungary	3	2	0	1	28	27	+1	4
7	Germany	3	1	1	1	24	21	+3	3
8	Cuba	3	0	0	3	22	29	−7	0

8 August 1992	Australia	7–5	Cuba	Piscina Municipal de Montjuïc

8 August 1992	Germany	7–8	Hungary	Piscina Municipal de Montjuïc

9 August 1992	Germany	10–6	Cuba	Piscina Municipal de Montjuïc

9 August 1992	Australia	9–8	Hungary	Piscina Municipal de Montjuïc

=== Group E ===
Pos	Team	Pld	W	D	L	GF	GA	GD	Pts
9	Netherlands	3	2	1	0	28	20	+8	5
10	Greece	3	2	1	0	24	18	+6	5
11	France	3	1	0	2	28	31	−3	2
12	Czechoslovakia	3	0	0	3	22	33	−11	0

8 August 1992	France	6–10	Greece	Piscina Municipal de Montjuïc

8 August 1992	Czechoslovakia	8–9	Netherlands	Piscina Municipal de Montjuïc

9 August 1992	Czechoslovakia	8–10	Greece	Piscina Municipal de Montjuïc

9 August 1992	France	8–15	Netherlands	Piscina Municipal de Montjuïc

=== Semi finals ===
8 August 1992	Italy	9–8	Unified Team	Piscina Municipal de Montjuïc

8 August 1992	United States	4–6	Spain	Piscina Municipal de Montjuïc

=== Bronze medal match ===
9 August 1992	United States	4–8	Unified Team	Piscina Municipal de Montjuïc

=== Gold medal match ===
9 August 1992	Spain	8–9	Italy	Piscines Bernat Picornell

== Final ranking ==
Gold medal	Italy
Silver medal	Spain
Bronze medal	Unified team
4	United States
5	Australia
6	Hungary
7	Germany
8	Cuba
9	Netherlands
10	Greece
11	France
12	Czechoslovakia

== Medallists ==
Gold	Silver	Bronze
Italy Francesco Attolico; Alessandro Bovo; Alessandro Campagna; Paolo Caldarella; Massimiliano Ferretti; Giuseppe Porzio; Marco D'Altrui; Mario Fiorillo; Ferdinando Gandolfi; Amedeo Pomilio; Francesco Porzio; Carlo Silipo; Gianni Averaimo Head Coach: Ratko Rudić	Spain Daniel Ballart; Jesús Rollán; Jordi Sans; Josep Picó; Manuel Estiarte; Manuel Silvestre; Marco Antonio González; Miguel Ángel Oca; Pedro Francisco García; Ricardo Sánchez; Rubén Michavila; Salvador Gómez; Sergi Pedrerol Head Coach: Dragan Matutinović	Unified Team Sergey Naumov; Alexandre Ogorodnikov; Aleksandr Chigir; Dmitri Apanassenko; Andrei Belofastov; Yevgeny Sharonov; Dmitry Gorshkov; Vladimir Karabutov; Aleksandr Kolotov; Andriy Kovalenko; Nikolay Kozlov; Serghei Marcoci; Alexei Vdovine Head Coach: Boris Popov

== See also ==
- 1991 FINA Men's World Water Polo Championship
- 1994 FINA Men's World Water Polo Championship

== Sources ==
- PDF documents in the LA84 Foundation Digital Library:
  - Official Report of the 1992 Olympic Games, v.5 (download, archive) (pp. 354, 386–400)
- Water polo on the Olympedia website
  - Water polo at the 1992 Summer Olympics (men's tournament)
- Water polo on the Sports Reference website
  - Water polo at the 1992 Summer Games (men's tournament) (archived)
