= Giuseppe D'Altrui =

Italian water polo player (1934–2024)

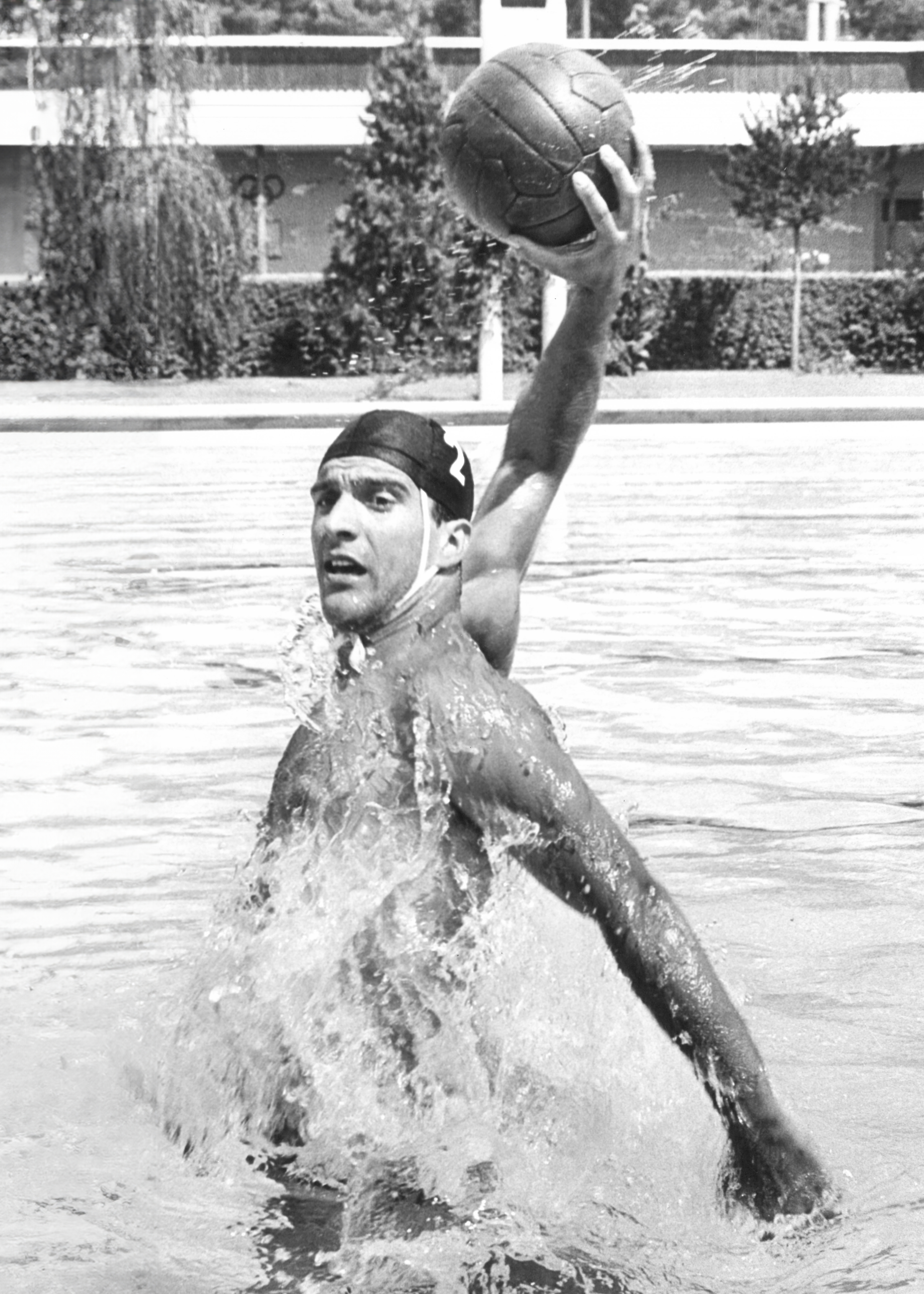

Personal information
- Born: April 7, 1934 Naples, Italy
- Died: February 26, 2024 (aged 89) Pescara, Italy
Medal record
Olympic Games
| Gold medal – first place | 1960 Rome | Team |
European Championships
| Bronze medal – third place | 1954 Turin | Team |
Mediterranean Games
| Gold medal – first place | 1955 Barcelona | Team |
| Gold medal – first place | 1963 Naples | Team |
| Silver medal – second place | 1959 Beirut | Team |

Giuseppe D'Altrui (7 April 1934 – 26 February 2024) was an Italian water polo player who competed in the 1956 Summer Olympics, in the 1960 Summer Olympics, and in the 1964 Summer Olympics. He was the father of Marco D'Altrui, who also won a water polo gold medal in the 1992 Summer Olympics.

== Biography ==
In 1956, he was a member of the Italian water polo team which finished fourth in the Olympic tournament. He played five matches.

Four years later he won the gold medal with the Italian team in the Olympic tournament. He played six matches and scored one goal. At the 1964 Games he finished again fourth with the Italian team in the Olympic tournament. He played five matches and scored one goal.

D'Altrui died in February 2024, at the age of 89.

== See also ==
- Italy men's Olympic water polo team records and statistics
- List of Olympic champions in men's water polo
- List of Olympic medalists in water polo (men)
- List of members of the International Swimming Hall of Fame
