= Eugenio Merello =

Italian water polo player

Personal information
- Nationality: Italian
- Born: 12 March 1940 (age 85); Genoa, Italy

Sport
- Sport: Water polo

Eugenio Merello (born 12 March 1940) is an Italian former water polo player. He competed at the 1964 Summer Olympics and the 1968 Summer Olympics.

== See also ==
- Italy men's Olympic water polo team records and statistics
- List of men's Olympic water polo tournament goalkeepers
