= Tullio Pandolfini =

Italian water polo player

Personal information
- Born: 6 August 1914 Florence, Italy
- Died: 23 April 1999 (aged 84) Florence, Italy
Medal record
Representing Italy
Olympic Games
Gold medal – first place	1948 London	Team competition

Tullio "Tullo" Pandolfini (6 August 1914 – 23 April 1999) was an Italian water polo player who competed in the 1948 Summer Olympics.

Pandolfini was part of the Italian team which won the gold medal. He played two matches.

His younger brother Gianfranco was also a member of the team and played five matches.

== See also ==
- Italy men's Olympic water polo team records and statistics
- List of Olympic champions in men's water polo
- List of Olympic medalists in water polo (men)
