= Czechoslovakia men's national water polo team =

Men's national water polo team representing Czechoslovakia

Czechoslovakia
- FINA code: TCH
- Confederation: LEN (Europe)

Olympic Games
- Appearances: 5 (first in 1920)
- Best result: 6th place (1924)

The Czechoslovakia men's national water polo team was the representative for Czechoslovakia in international men's water polo.

== Results ==
=== Olympic Games ===
- 1920 — 12th place
- 1924 — 6th place
- 1928 — 9th place
- 1936 — 11th place
- 1992 — 12th place

== Notable members ==
- Pavol Steiner (1908–1969), Olympic water polo player, swimmer, and cardiac surgeon
