= Gianfranco Pandolfini =

Italian water polo player (1920–1997)

Personal information
- Born: 16 September 1920 Florence, Italy
- Died: 3 January 1997 (aged 76) Florence, Italy

Sport
- Sport: Water polo
Medal record
Representing Italy
Olympic Games
Gold medal – first place	1948 London	Team competition

Gianfranco Pandolfini (16 September 1920 – 3 January 1997) was an Italian water polo player who competed in the 1948 Summer Olympics.

Pandolfini was part of the Italian team which won the gold medal. He played five matches.

His older brother Tullio was also a member of the team and played two matches.

== See also ==
- Italy men's Olympic water polo team records and statistics
- List of Olympic champions in men's water polo
- List of Olympic medalists in water polo (men)
