= Cosimo Antonelli =

Italian water polo player

Personal information
- Born: 23 July 1925; Venice, Italy
- Died: 14 January 2014 (aged 88); Venice, Italy

Sport
- Sport: Water polo

Cosimo "Nino" Antonelli (23 July 1925 – 14 January 2014) was an Italian water polo player who competed in the 1956 Summer Olympics. He was born in Venice. In 1956 he was a member of the Italian team which finished fourth in the Olympic tournament. He played one match as goalkeeper.

== See also ==
- Italy men's Olympic water polo team records and statistics
- List of men's Olympic water polo tournament goalkeepers
