= Ratko Rudić =

Croatian water polo player and coach

Ratko Rudić Playing History
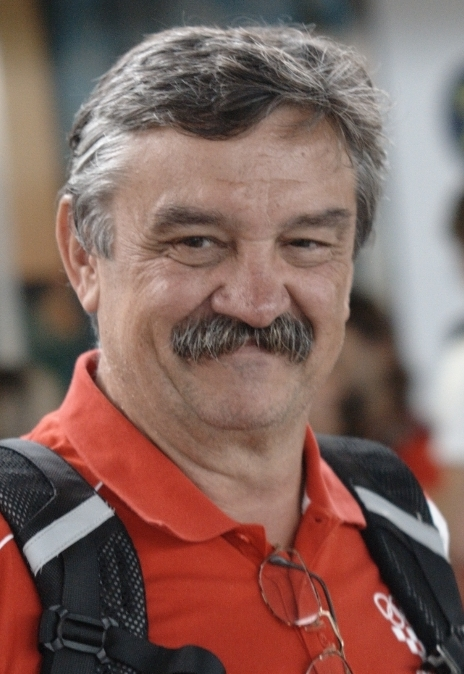
- Rudić in 2012

Personal information
- Nationality: Croatia / Yugoslavia
- Born: 7 June 1948 (age 78) Belgrade, PR Serbia, FPR Yugoslavia
- Height: 188 cm (6 ft 2 in)
- Weight: 87 kg (192 lb)

Sport
- Sport: Water polo
National team
- Years: Team
- 1968–1980: Yugoslavia
Medal record
Olympic Games
Silver medal – second place	1980 Moscow
World Championship
Bronze medal – third place	1973 Belgrade
European Championship
Silver medal – second place	1977 Jönköping
Bronze medal – third place	1970 Barcelona
Bronze medal – third place	1974 Vienna
- Updated on 7 May 2020

Ratko Rudić (born 7 June 1948) is a retired Croatian water polo coach and a former water polo player. As of 2015, he has won 38 medals as a coach at major events, making him the most successful water polo coach in history, and second most successful team sport coach of all time. He won four gold medals, of which three were consecutive, with three different national teams at the Summer Olympics, as well as three gold medals with three national teams at the World Championships, among many others. In 2007 was inducted into the International Swimming Hall of Fame, described as "one of the best, if not the best, water polo coach to walk the deck of the pool".

In 1989 received AVNOJ award, the highest Yugoslav award. In 2007 received Franjo Bučar State Award for Sport as Yearly Award, while in 2012 Award for Life Achievement. In 2012 was the recipient of Order of Duke Branimir in Croatia, while in 2018 of Palma al Merito Tecnico by the Italian National Olympic Committee.

In 2012 he retired from coaching and became sports director of the Croatian Water Polo Federation until late 2013 when he became the coach of the Brazil men's national team to lead them through the 2016 Summer Olympics. From 2018 to 2020 he was the coach of Italian water polo club Pro Recco.

On 6 May 2020, Rudić announced his retirement from water polo.

== Early life ==
He was born on 7 June 1948 in Belgrade, SFR Yugoslavia, to father Jakov and mother Zorica. As his father was a military officer he lived two years in Belgrade, four years in Rijeka, Zadar and Split, and six years in Zagreb. He started playing water polo in 1958 as a child in club Jedinstvo from Zadar. His debut in a first league game was in 1963 (as 15 years old), for VK Jadran Split against HAVK Mladost.

Although his desire was to study at the Academy of Fine Arts (and continued to paint), he initially studied architecture in Zagreb, but as professional player moved to Belgrade in 1971, and there finished studies at the Faculty of Physical Education. He lived in Belgrade until 1990, when lived and worked in Rome until 2000, and from then until 2004 in Los Angeles.

He has a daughter Martina who is a cellist in Milan.

== Playing career ==
He played for club VK Jadran Split from 1963 till 1971, when moved to VK Partizan. He decided for the club because it was the only alongside HAVK Mladost from Zagreb which had full year training, and several other Croatian players were brought in the same year, as well the coach from Dubrovnik. With the team won eight Yugoslavian championships, six Yugoslavian cups, and two European Champions League in 1974 and 1975.

Rudić played 297 games for the Yugoslavian water polo team, winning gold medals in 1971 and 1979, and silver medal at the 1975 Mediterranean Games; bronze medals in 1970 and 1974, and silver medal at the 1977 European Championship; bronze medal at the 1973 World Championship; and silver medal at the 1980 Summer Olympics.

At the 1968 Olympics he was injured before the tournament and was unable to play with his team which went on to win the gold medal. At the World Championship in 1975, he was falsely accused of doping, and so the entire Yugoslav national team was disqualified. Only after a subsequent investigation by Manfred Donike proved that Rudić did not take any banned substances, he and his team were exonerated. His case was included in professional literature as an example of the wrong analysis. At the 1976 Olympics was a reserve due to injury, but helped tactically and soon became assistant coach in VK Partizan.

== Coaching career ==
Ratko Rudić Coaching History
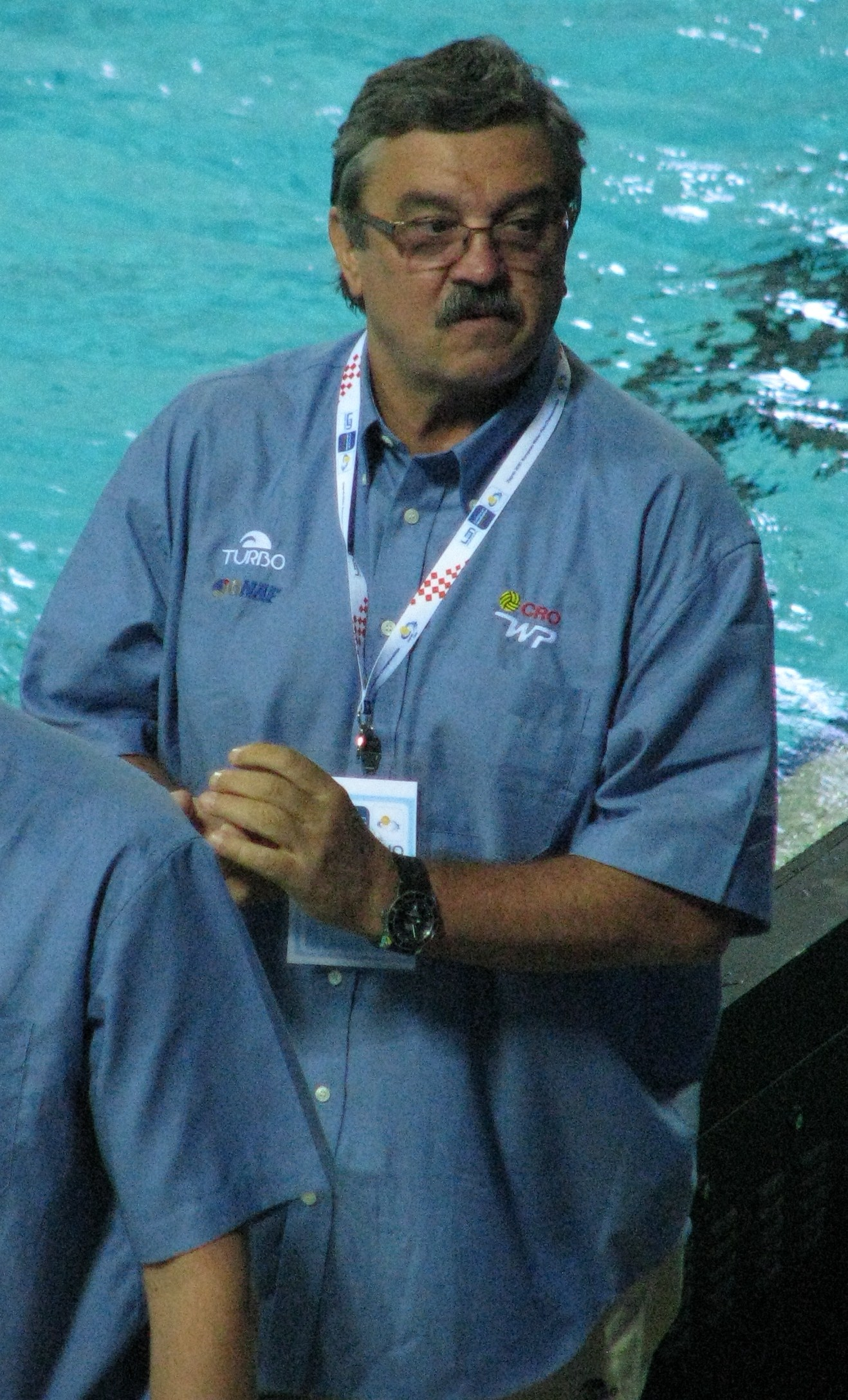
- Ratko Rudić in 2010 with Croatia

Sport
- Sport: Water polo
- Current club: Retired

Teams coached
- Years: Team
- 1984–1988: Yugoslavia
- 1990–2000: Italy
- 2001–2004: United States
- 2005–2012: Croatia
- 2013–2016: Brazil
- 2018–2020: Pro Recco
Medal record
Olympic Games
Gold medal – first place	1984 Los Angeles
Gold medal – first place	1988 Seoul
Gold medal – first place	1992 Barcelona
Gold medal – first place	2012 London
Bronze medal – third place	1996 Atlanta
World Championship
Gold medal – first place	1986 Madrid
Gold medal – first place	1994 Rome
Gold medal – first place	2007 Melbourne
Bronze medal – third place	2009 Rome
Bronze medal – third place	2011 Shanghai
FINA World Cup
Gold medal – first place	1987 Thessaloniki
Gold medal – first place	1993 Athens
Silver medal – second place	1995 Atlanta
Silver medal – second place	1999 Sydney
Silver medal – second place	2010 Oradea
FINA World League
Gold medal – first place	2012 Almaty
Silver medal – second place	2009 Podgorica
Bronze medal – third place	2003 New York
Bronze medal – third place	2010 Niš
Bronze medal – third place	2011 Florence
Bronze medal – third place	2015 Bergamo
European Championship
Gold medal – first place	1993 Sheffield
Gold medal – first place	1995 Vienna
Gold medal – first place	2010 Zagreb
Silver medal – second place	1985 Sofia
Silver medal – second place	1987 Strasbourg
Bronze medal – third place	1999 Florence
Pan American Games
Gold medal – first place	2003 Santo Domingo
Silver medal – second place	2015 Toronto
- Updated on 7 May 2020

During his career Rudić coached five national teams: Yugoslavia (1984–1988), Italy (1990–2000), USA (2001–2004), Croatia (2005–2012), and Brazil (2013–2016). As a coach he works with much preparation, including control training, testing, tactics, and technique. He is one of the first coaches who had a multidisciplinary coaching staff, with specific emphasis on cooperation with psychologists. He especially works on the long-term programmes which leave behind long-term positive consequences in the national teams.

Rudić is considered by sports historians to be the most successful water polo coach in Olympic history. He led three different men's national teams to win four gold medals and one bronze medal at the Summer Olympics. He is one of a few sportspeople who won Olympic medals in water polo as players and head coaches.

=== Yugoslavia ===
Rudić started his coaching career as the coach of juniors in VK Partizan between 1980 and 1983, and between 1983 and 1984 coached the Yugoslavian junior national team, which won silver medals at the World (1983) and European Championship (1983, 1984). Several players like Dubravko Šimenc, Perica Bukić, and Igor Milanović formed the core in the following Yugoslavian golden period. He received the nickname Tiranin (Tyrant) because he demanded a considerable amount of work and discipline.

He was the coach of the Yugoslavia men's national water polo team between 1984 and 1988, and won two consecutive gold medals at the 1984 and 1988 Summer Olympics; gold medal at the 1986 World Championship; two consecutive silver medals at the 1985 and 1987 European Water Polo Championship; and gold medal at the 1987 World Cup.

=== Italy ===
After the coach position at VK Partizan between 1989 and 1990 (COMEN Cup), in 1990 he became the coach of Italy. His work in Italy initially was in the conflict with the players who had tactical and technical skills but lack of physical working philosophy. As the very strenuous trainings were accepted they eventually became the best national team at the time. They were the first national team to win all titles in one Olympic cycle. In 1994, after the gold medal at the 1994 World Championship, changed almost the whole team with younger players which was received with harsh criticism by the sport journalist in Italy, but nevertheless won gold medal at the 1995 European Championship. The period as the coach of the Italy national team, however, ended in controversy: at the end of the quarterfinals of the 2000 Summer Olympics in which Italy lost against Hungary 5–8, Rudić reportedly accused the officials for a planned conspiracy against the Italian team (due to referee decisions), which cost him a yearly suspension from all competitions by FINA.

As the coach of Italy men's national water polo team he won gold medal at the 1992, and bronze at the 1996 Summer Olympics; gold medal at the 1994 World Championship; gold medals at the 1993 and 1995, and bronze at the 1999 European Championship; gold medal at 1993, and silver medals at the 1995 and 1999 World Cup.

=== United States ===
Rudić lived and worked as the coach in the United States from January 2001 until 2004. As water polo in USA was mostly a Southern California college level sport, Rudić recalls that the initial organization and competition system was in bad condition, with small number of players, and the first years were the hardest part of his career. He praised the work ethic in USA compared to other teams which helped his stay, and several players like Wolf Wigo and Tony Azevedo acknowledged his method of work. He organized the entire professional work in their association, which included working with youth categories, the selection and training of trainers, selection of players, and their preparation.

As the coach of United States men's national water polo team he won a gold medal at the 2003 Pan American Games; and bronze medal at the 2003 World League. Although there was a strategic programme by Rudić titled Project Gold to take the team through the 2008 Summer Olympics, and signed four-year contract before the 2004 Olympics, in the late 2004 on the behalf of the President of Croatia Stjepan Mesić accepted the new coaching mission. However, in the USA they continued to work by his programme and won the silver medal at the 2008 Olympics.

=== Croatia ===
According to Rudić surprisingly the most motivational work on cohesion inside and outside the national team had to do in Croatia. He was critical of the poor funding considering the results achieved by the team in comparison with football. By the Croatian Olympic Committee was awarded for the most successful Croatian coach in 2007, and 2012.

As the coach of Croatia men's national water polo team he won gold medal at the 2012 Summer Olympics; gold medal at 2007, and bronze medals at the 2009 and 2011 World Championship; gold medal at the 2010 European Championship; silver medal at the 2010 World Cup; silver medal at 2009, bronze at 2010 and 2011, and gold at the 2012 World League.

=== Brazil ===
Rudić became the coach of Brazil men's national water polo team in November 2013. He led the team to the bronze medal at the 2015 World League; and silver medal at the 2015 Pan American Games. He was awarded for the best coach of the Olympic Committee of the host country of the Olympic Games. Brazil have been drawn into Group A of the Olympic competition, alongside Australia, Greece, Hungary, Japan, and Serbia. They won against Serbia 6-5, who were unbeaten more than two years.

=== Pro Recco ===
Rudić returned once again from retirement in June 2018, as 70 years old, when became the coach of Italian water polo club Pro Recco. With the club he won one Serie A1 and Coppa Italia as well bronze medal at the 2018–19 LEN Champions League.

On 6 May 2020, Rudić announced that he had officially retired from water polo aged 71 years, 334 days.

== Coaching style ==
It is considered that Rudić is the most responsible for the contemporary water polo playing style, although did not invent it. Rudić is an heir of the Yugoslavian system and style, and due to his success many coaches tried to adopt his methods and style. However, Dante Dettamanti criticized the style for being too static and vertical, which is best suited for the physically big sized players. The style favors size aspect rather than speed.

Another product of the system is the long and torturous training sessions, for which Rudić is also famous. It includes 8 hours a day of swimming in the pool, heavy style weight lifting sessions, leg work, and skill and tactical sessions. United States player Layne Beaubien recalls that in the American colleges a daily norm was 3,000 meters, while under Rudić initially 5,000 and later up to 18,000 meters, noting "it's all mental. That's all it is. That's why he makes us do it. Being able to push yourself when you're so tired, being able to push yourself to the next level". As Ricardo Azevedo noted, "if a player quits in practice, he will eventually quit in a game". Dettamanti considered that such methods are unnecessary for the international water polo, and that Rudić's success is rather the result of his game knowledge, teaching of skills and tactics.

== Quotes ==
The team has to 'feel' that the attention of the entire organizational structure is addressed to them. The work environment is the first motivational factor. The motivation is the decisive factor in the victory of a team.

— Ratko Rudić,

== See also ==
- Yugoslavia men's Olympic water polo team records and statistics
- Italy men's Olympic water polo team records and statistics
- United States men's Olympic water polo team records and statistics
- Croatia men's Olympic water polo team records and statistics
- Brazil men's Olympic water polo team records and statistics
- List of Olympic champions in men's water polo
- List of Olympic medalists in water polo (men)
- List of world champions in men's water polo
- List of World Aquatics Championships medalists in water polo
- List of members of the International Swimming Hall of Fame
