= Enzo Cavazzoni =

Italian water polo player

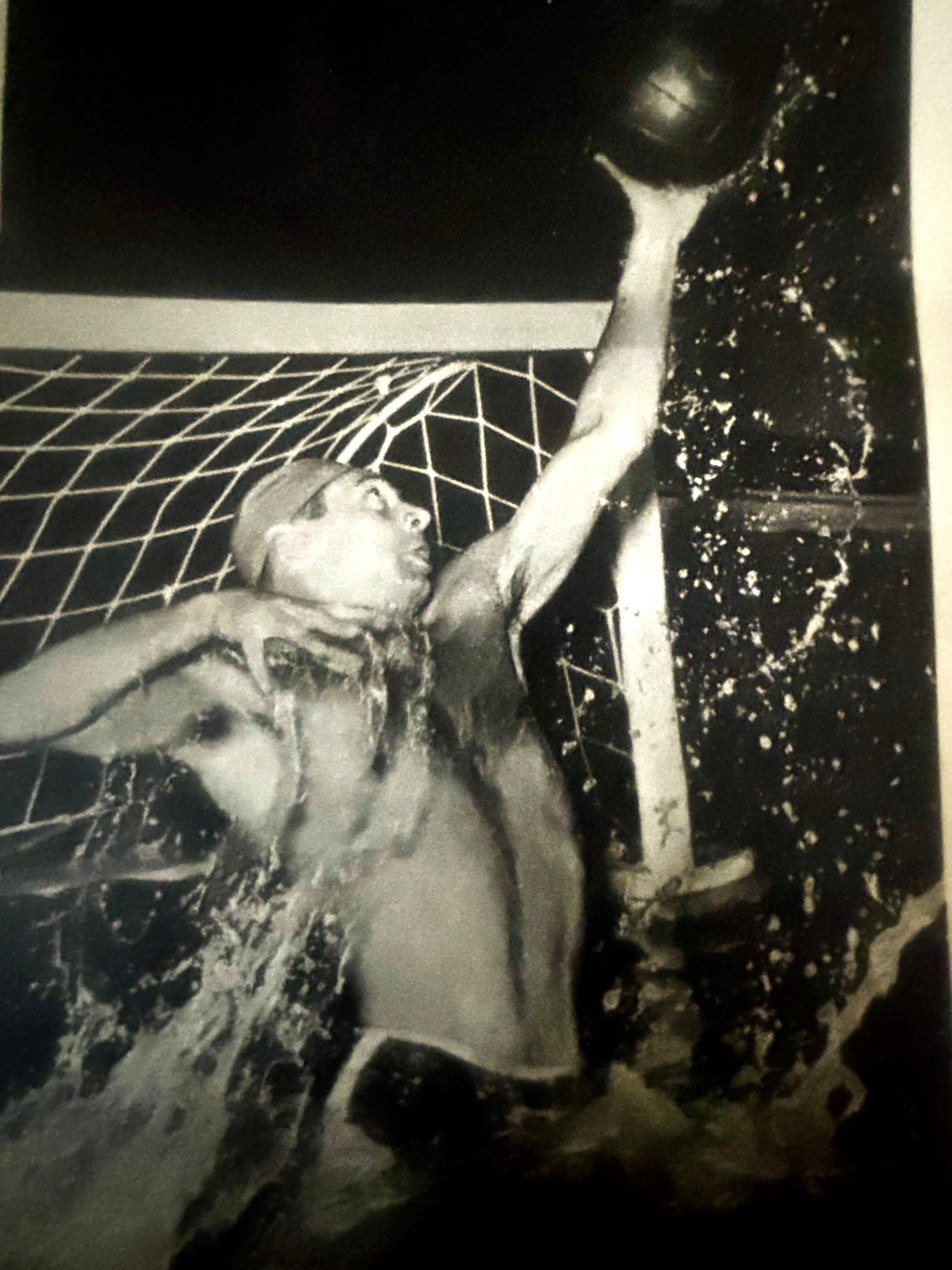

Personal information
- Nationality: Italy
- Born: March 2, 1932 Genoa, Italy
- Died: August 15, 2012 (aged 80) Victoria, British Columbia, Canada

Sport
- Sport: Water polo

Enzo Cavazzoni (2 March 1932 – 15 August 2012) was an Italian water polo player who competed in the 1956 Summer Olympics.

In 1956 he was a member of the Italian team which finished fourth in the Olympic tournament. He played five matches as goalkeeper.

== See also ==
- Italy men's Olympic water polo team records and statistics
- List of men's Olympic water polo tournament goalkeepers
