= Giancarlo Guerrini =

Italian water polo player (1939–2025)

Personal information
- Born: 29 December 1939 Rome, Italy
- Died: 21 March 2025 (aged 85) Rome, Italy

Sport
- Sport: Water polo
Medal record
Representing Italy
Olympic Games
Gold medal – first place	1960 Rome	Team competition

Giancarlo Guerrini (29 December 1939 – 21 March 2025) was an Italian water polo player who competed in the 1960 Summer Olympics, in the 1964 Summer Olympics, and in the 1968 Summer Olympics.

== Biography ==
When Guerrini was 15 years old, he did not know how to swim, and almost drowned in a trip to Ostia. He began taking swimming lessons, and instructors noticed that he had natural skill. He began participating in water polo.

In the 1960 Summer Olympics, he was a member of the Italian water polo team which won the gold medal. He also competed in the 1964 Summer Olympics and the 1968 Summer Olympics. He was honored as a Knight of the Order of Merit of the Italian Republic in 2002, and won the Golden Collar for Sports Merit in 2016. He also served as the secretary general of the Italian Fencing Federation.

Guerrini died in Rome on 21 March 2025, at the age of 85.

== See also ==
- Italy men's Olympic water polo team records and statistics
- List of Olympic champions in men's water polo
- List of Olympic medalists in water polo (men)
