= Ferdinando Gandolfi =

Italian water polo player

Personal information
- Born: January 5, 1967 (age 59) Genoa, Italy

Sport
- Sport: Water polo
Medal record
Representing Italy
Olympic Games
Gold medal – first place	1992 Barcelona	Team competition
World Championships
Gold medal – first place	1994 Rome	Team competition

Ferdinando Gandolfi (born 5 January 1967) is an Italian former water polo player who competed in the 1992 Summer Olympics.

== See also ==
- Italy men's Olympic water polo team records and statistics
- List of Olympic champions in men's water polo
- List of Olympic medalists in water polo (men)
- List of world champions in men's water polo
- List of World Aquatics Championships medalists in water polo
