= Nikolai Smirnov (water polo) =

Ukrainian water polo player

Personal information
- Born: 27 February 1961 (age 65) Lviv, Soviet Union

Sport
- Sport: Water polo
Medal record
Representing the Soviet Union
Olympic Games
Bronze medal – third place	1988 Seoul	Team competition
World Championships
Gold medal – first place	1982 Guayaquil	Team competition
Bronze medal – third place	1986 Madrid	Team competition
European Championships
Gold medal – first place	1983 Rome	Team competition
Gold medal – first place	1985 Sofia	Team competition
Silver medal – second place	1981 Split	Team competition

Nikolai Smirnov (born 27 February 1961) is a Ukrainian former water polo player who competed in the 1988 Summer Olympics.

== See also ==
- List of Olympic medalists in water polo (men)
- List of world champions in men's water polo
- List of World Aquatics Championships medalists in water polo
