= Mirko Vičević =

Croatian water polo player

Personal information
- Born: 30 June 1968 (age 57) Kotor, SFR Yugoslavia
Medal record
Men's water polo
Representing Yugoslavia
Olympic Games
Gold medal – first place	1988 Seoul	Team competition
World Championships
Gold medal – first place	1986 Madrid	Team competition
Gold medal – first place	1991 Perth	Team competition
European Championships
Gold medal – first place	1991 Athens	Team competition
Silver medal – second place	1987 Strasbourg	Team competition

Mirko Vičević (30 June 1968) is a Montenegrin retired water polo player. He achieved 1057 goals in his career. He is a member of the World House of Fame. He was part of the Yugoslavia team which won the gold medal in water polo in the 1986 World Championships and 1988 Summer Olympics.

== See also ==
- Yugoslavia men's Olympic water polo team records and statistics
- List of Olympic champions in men's water polo
- List of Olympic medalists in water polo (men)
- List of world champions in men's water polo
- List of World Aquatics Championships medalists in water polo
