= Giuseppe Castellucci =

Italian architect (1863–1939)

Giuseppe Castellucci (28 April 1863 – 8 April 1939) was an Italian architect, mostly specializing in restoration or updating works in a Neo-gothic style.

== Biography ==
Giuseppe Castellucci was born in Arezzo, and active throughout Tuscany as an architect. He studied at the Museo Industriale of Turin. Among his mentors and teachers were Luigi del Moro, Vincenzo Micheli, and Crescentino Caselli.

As a young man, he helped illustrate with K. Von Stegmann and H. Von Geymuller the text of Architetture del Rinascimento in Toscana (Die Architekur der Renaissance in Toscana), published in 1885 in Munich. He became a frequent commentator and illustrator for the journal of Ricordi di Architettura. In 1889, he was appointed as professor of Architectural design for the Accademia delle Belle Arti di Firenze. In 1892, he was appointed as architect for the Office of Conservation of Monuments in Tuscany. He was appointed as director of the Opera del Duomo of Florence. In some restorations he worked with Camillo Boito. He also worked for private patrons.

He is noted for often adding novel and somewhat anachronistic details to his projects to flavor them with neogothic details. He was active in the restoration of the urban cityscape of Arezzo.

He was made a member or an adjunct of the Accademia delle Belle Arti of Carrara, the Accademia Albertina, the Società Colombaria of Florence, the Accademia Petrarca di Lettere, Arti e Scienze of Arezzo, and of the Association of the Virtuosi del Pantheon of Rome. He was awarded the medal of the Order of the Crown of Italy, and inducted into the Order of Marucelliana.

== Bibliography ==
- Miano, Giuseppe (1978). "CASTELLUCCI, Giuseppe". Dizionario Biografico degli Italiani, Volume 21: Caruso–Castelnuovo (in Italian). Rome: Istituto dell'Enciclopedia Italiana. ISBN 978-8-81200032-6.
