= Alessandro Bovo =

Italian water polo player

Personal information
- Born: 1 January 1969 (age 57) Genoa, Italy
Medal record
Men's water polo
Representing Italy
Olympic Games
Gold medal – first place	1992 Barcelona	Team competition
Bronze medal – third place	1996 Atlanta	Team competition
World Championships
Gold medal – first place	1994 Rome	Team competition
European Championships
Gold medal – first place	1993 Sheffield	Team competition
Gold medal – first place	1995 Vienna	Team competition
FINA World Cup
Gold medal – first place	1993 Athens	Team competition
Silver medal – second place	1995 Atlanta	Team competition

Alessandro Bovo (born 1 January 1969) is a retired water polo defense player from Italy, who represented his native country at two consecutive Summer Olympics: 1992 and 1996.

After having won the gold medal in Barcelona, Spain Bovo claimed bronze with the men's national team at the 1996 Summer Olympics in Atlanta, United States. He also won one world title, two European titles and one FINA World Cup with the national squad during his career.

== See also ==
- Italy men's Olympic water polo team records and statistics
- List of Olympic champions in men's water polo
- List of Olympic medalists in water polo (men)
- List of world champions in men's water polo
- List of World Aquatics Championships medalists in water polo
