= Mario Majoni =

Italian water polo player

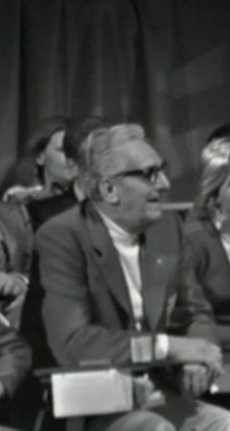
- Mario Majoni (1972)

Personal information
- Born: 27 May 1910 Genoa, Italy
- Died: 16 August 1985 (aged 75) Genoa, Italy

Sport
- Sport: Water polo
Medal record
Representing Italy
Olympic Games
Gold medal – first place	1948 London	Team competition

Mario Majoni (27 May 1910 – 16 August 1985) was an Italian water polo player who competed in the 1948 Summer Olympics.

He was part of the Italian team which won the gold medal. He played three matches. His name is often spelled Maioni, but most Italian sources spell it with a j.

== See also ==
- Italy men's Olympic water polo team records and statistics
- List of Olympic champions in men's water polo
- List of Olympic medalists in water polo (men)
- List of members of the International Swimming Hall of Fame
