= Giuseppe Valle (water polo) =

Italian water polo player

Personal information
- Nationality: Italian
- Born: 15 March 1904; Genoa, Italy
- Died: 25 September 1990 (aged 86)

Sport
- Sport: Water polo

Giuseppe Valle (15 March 1904 – 25 September 1990) was an Italian water polo player. He competed in the men's tournament at the 1924 Summer Olympics.

== See also ==
- Italy men's Olympic water polo team records and statistics
- List of Olympic champions in men's water polo
