= Francesco Attolico =

Italian water polo player

Personal information
- Born: 23 March 1963 (age 63) Bari, Italy
Medal record
Men's water polo
Representing Italy
Olympic Games
Gold medal – first place	1992 Barcelona	Team competition
Bronze medal – third place	1996 Atlanta	Team competition
World Championships
Gold medal – first place	1994 Rome	Team competition
European Championships
Gold medal – first place	1993 Sheffield	Team competition
Gold medal – first place	1995 Vienna	Team competition
FINA World Cup
Gold medal – first place	1993 Athens	Team competition
Silver medal – second place	1989 Berlin	Team competition
Silver medal – second place	1995 Atlanta	Team competition

Francesco Attolico (born 23 March 1963) is a retired water polo goalkeeper from Italy, who represented his native country at three consecutive Summer Olympics: 1992, 1996 and 2000.

== See also ==
- Italy men's Olympic water polo team records and statistics
- List of Olympic champions in men's water polo
- List of Olympic medalists in water polo (men)
- List of men's Olympic water polo tournament goalkeepers
- List of world champions in men's water polo
- List of World Aquatics Championships medalists in water polo
