= Carlo Silipo =

Italian water polo player

Personal information
- Born: 10 September 1971 (age 54) Naples, Italy
- Height: 6 ft 6 in (1.99 m)
- Weight: 211 lb (96 kg)
Medal record
Men's water polo
Representing Italy
Olympic Games
Gold medal – first place	1992 Barcelona	Team competition
Bronze medal – third place	1996 Atlanta	Team competition
World Championships
Silver medal – second place	2003 Barcelona	Team competition
FINA World Cup
Silver medal – second place	1999 Sydney	Team competition

Carlo Silipo (born 10 September 1971) is a retired water polo player from Italy, who represented his native country at three Summer Olympics: 1992, 1996 and 2004. After having won the gold medal in Barcelona, Spain, he won bronze with the men's national team at the 1996 Summer Olympics in Atlanta, United States.

== See also ==
- Italy men's Olympic water polo team records and statistics
- List of Olympic champions in men's water polo
- List of Olympic medalists in water polo (men)
- List of players who have appeared in multiple men's Olympic water polo tournaments
- List of world champions in men's water polo
- List of World Aquatics Championships medalists in water polo
- List of members of the International Swimming Hall of Fame

== Bibliography ==
- RAI profile
