= Amedeo Pomilio =

Italian water polo player

Personal information
- Born: 11 February 1967 (age 59) Pescara, Italy

Sport
- Sport: Water polo
Medal record
Representing Italy
Olympic Games
Gold medal – first place	1992 Barcelona	Team competition
Bronze medal – third place	1996 Atlanta	Team competition
World Championships
Gold medal – first place	1994 Rome	Team competition

Amedeo Pomilio (born 11 February 1967) is an Italian former water polo player who competed in the 1992 Summer Olympics, in the 1996 Summer Olympics, and in the 2000 Summer Olympics.

== See also ==
- Italy men's Olympic water polo team records and statistics
- List of Olympic champions in men's water polo
- List of Olympic medalists in water polo (men)
- List of world champions in men's water polo
- List of World Aquatics Championships medalists in water polo
