= Viktor Berendyuha =

Ukrainian water polo player (born 1962)

Personal information
- Born: 27 January 1962 (age 64) Lviv, Soviet Union

Sport
- Sport: Water polo
Medal record
Representing the Soviet Union
Olympic Games
Bronze medal – third place	1988 Seoul	Team competition
World Championships
Bronze medal – third place	1986 Madrid	Team competition
European Championships
Gold medal – first place	1985 Sofia	Team competition
Gold medal – first place	1987 Strasbourg	Team competition

Viktor Berendyuha (born 27 January 1962) is a Ukrainian former water polo player who competed in the 1988 Summer Olympics.

== See also ==
- List of Olympic medalists in water polo (men)
- List of World Aquatics Championships medalists in water polo
