= Dante Rossi =

Italian water polo player

Personal information
- Born: 28 August 1936 Bologna, Italy
- Died: 15 March 2013 (aged 76) Lavagna, Italy

Sport
- Sport: Water polo
Medal record
Representing Italy
Olympic Games
Gold medal – first place	1960 Rome	Team competition

Dante Rossi (28 August 1936 – 15 March 2013) was an Italian water polo player who competed in the 1960 Summer Olympics and in the 1964 Summer Olympics. He was born in Bologna, Italy.

In 1960 he was a member of the Italian water polo team which won the gold medal. He played five matches as goalkeeper. Four years later he finished fourth with the Italian team in the water polo competition at the Tokyo Games. He played six matches as goalkeeper.

== See also ==
- Italy men's Olympic water polo team records and statistics
- List of Olympic champions in men's water polo
- List of Olympic medalists in water polo (men)
- List of men's Olympic water polo tournament goalkeepers
