= Tomislav Paškvalin =

Croatian water polo player

Personal information
- Born: 29 August 1961 (age 65) Zagreb, SR Croatia, SFR Yugoslavia
- Height: 204 cm (6 ft 8 in)
- Weight: 137 kg (302 lb)
Medal record
Men's water polo
Representing Yugoslavia
Olympic Games
Gold medal – first place	1984 Los Angeles	Team competition
Gold medal – first place	1988 Los Angeles	Team competition
World Aquatics Championship
Gold medal – first place	1986 Madrid	Team competition
European Water Polo Championship
Silver medal – second place	1985 Sofia	Team competition
Silver medal – second place	1987 Strasbourg	Team competition
Mediterranean Games
Gold medal – first place	1983 Casablanca	Team competition

Tomislav Paškvalin (born 29 August 1961) is a retired Croatian water polo player. He is a double Olympic gold medal winner with Yugoslavia at the 1984 and 1988 Summer Olympics.

As of 2014, Paškvalin is a member of the Croatian Olympic Committee's supervisory board.

His son, Fran, was also an international water polo player.

== See also ==
- Yugoslavia men's Olympic water polo team records and statistics
- List of Olympic champions in men's water polo
- List of Olympic medalists in water polo (men)
- List of world champions in men's water polo
- List of World Aquatics Championships medalists in water polo
