= Gianni Lonzi =

Italian water polo player (born 1938)

Personal information
- Born: August 4, 1938 (age 87) Florence, Italy

Sport
- Sport: Water polo
Medal record
Representing Italy
Olympic Games
Gold medal – first place	1960 Rome	Team competition

Gianni Lonzi (born August 4, 1938) is an Italian water polo player who competed in the 1960 Summer Olympics, in the 1964 Summer Olympics, and in the 1968 Summer Olympics.

In 1960 he was a member of the Italian water polo team which won the gold medal. He played five matches.

Four years later he finished fourth with the Italian team in the water polo competition at the Tokyo Games. He played six matches.

At the 1968 Games he was part of the Italian team which finished again fourth in the Olympic water polo tournament. He played all nine matches.

As a head coach, Lonzi led Italy men's national team to win an Olympic silver medal in 1976, becoming one of a few sportspeople who won Olympic medals in water polo as players and head coaches.

He is married from 1968 with the Italian fencer Olympic Champion Antonella Ragno.

== See also ==
- Italy men's Olympic water polo team records and statistics
- List of Olympic champions in men's water polo
- List of Olympic medalists in water polo (men)
- List of world champions in men's water polo
- List of members of the International Swimming Hall of Fame
