= Sergey Naumov =

Russian water polo player

Personal information
- Born: 9 April 1962 (age 64) Moscow, Soviet Union

Sport
- Sport: Water polo
Medal record
Representing Soviet Union
Olympic Games
Bronze medal – third place	1988 Seoul	Team competition
World Championships
Bronze medal – third place	1986 Madrid	Team competition
European Championships
Gold medal – first place	1983 Rome	Team competition
Gold medal – first place	1985 Sofia	Team competition
Gold medal – first place	1987 Strasbourg	Team competition
Bronze medal – third place	1991 Athens	Team competition
Representing Unified Team
Olympic Games
Bronze medal – third place	1992 Barcelona	Team competition

Sergey Naumov (Russian: Серге́й Нау́мов; born 9 April 1962) is a Soviet former water polo player, born in Moscow, who competed in the 1988 Summer Olympics and in the 1992 Summer Olympics.

== See also ==
- List of Olympic medalists in water polo (men)
- List of World Aquatics Championships medalists in water polo
