= Paolo Caldarella =

Italian water polo player

Personal information
- Born: September 20, 1964 Milan, Italy
- Died: September 27, 1993 (aged 29) Syracuse, Sicily, Italy

Sport
- Sport: Water polo
Medal record
Representing Italy
Olympic Games
Gold medal – first place	1992 Barcelona	Team competition
World Championships
Silver medal – second place	1986 Madrid	Team competition
European Championships
Gold medal – first place	1993 Sheffield	Team competition
Bronze medal – third place	1987 Strasbourg	Team competition
Bronze medal – third place	1989 Bonn	Team competition
Summer Universiade
Gold medal – first place	1987 Zagreb	Team competition
Mediterranean Games
Gold medal – first place	1987 Latakia	Team competition
Gold medal – first place	1991 Athens	Team competition
Gold medal – first place	1993 Languedoc-Rousillon	Team competition

Paolo Caldarella (20 September 1964 – 27 September 1993) was an Italian water polo player who competed in the 1988 Summer Olympics and in the 1992 Summer Olympics.

== See also ==
- Italy men's Olympic water polo team records and statistics
- List of Olympic champions in men's water polo
- List of Olympic medalists in water polo (men)
- List of World Aquatics Championships medalists in water polo
