= Franco Lavoratori =

Italian water polo player (1941–2006)

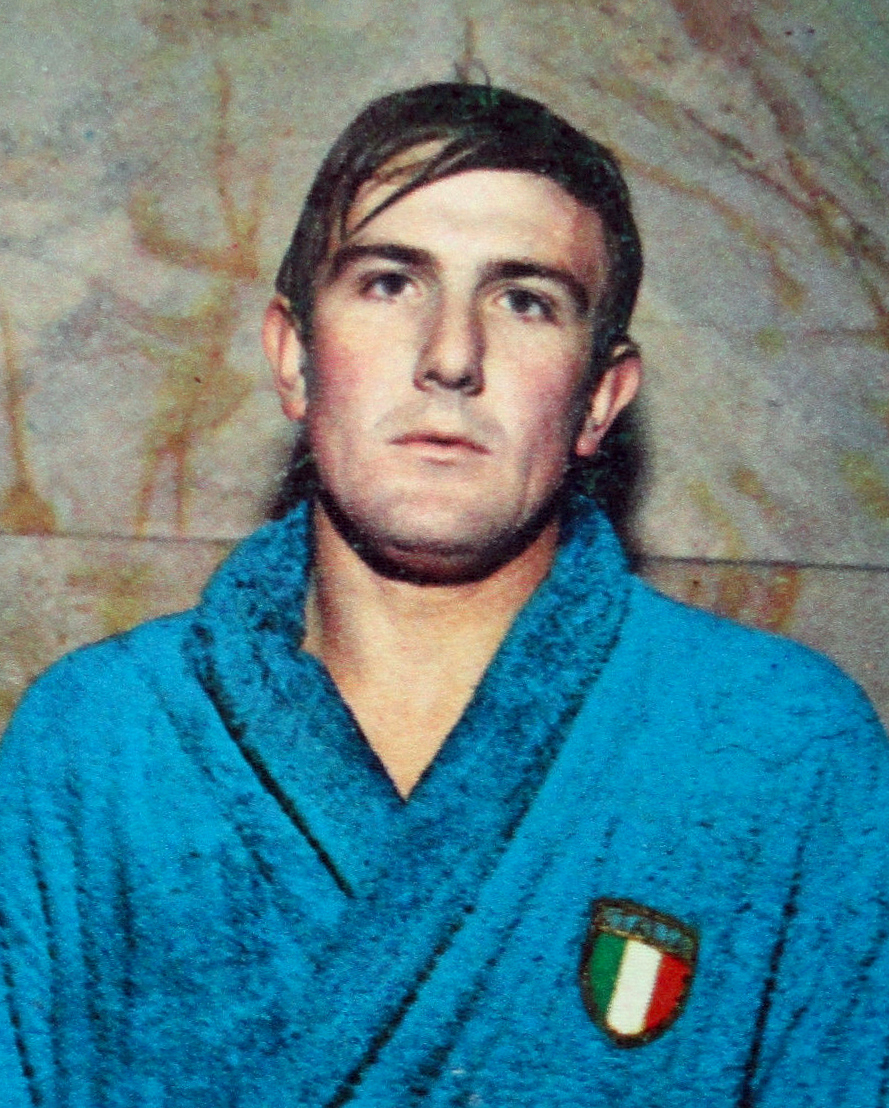

Personal information
- Born: 15 March 1941 Recco, Genova, Italy
- Died: 3 May 2006 (aged 65) Genoa, Italy
- Height: 1.80 m (5 ft 11 in)
- Weight: 78 kg (172 lb)

Sport
- Sport: Water Polo
- Club: Pro Recco
Medal record
Representing Italy
Olympic Games
Gold medal – first place	1960 Rome	Team competition

Franco Lavoratori (15 March 1941 – 3 May 2006) was an Italian water polo player. He competed at the 1960, 1964, 1968 and 1972 Olympics and finished in first, fourth, fourth and sixth place; he scored four, zero, six and three goals, respectively. Between 1959 and 1974, he won 14 Italian titles, as well as one domestic cup in 1974 and one European Cup in 1965.

== See also ==
- Italy men's Olympic water polo team records and statistics
- List of Olympic champions in men's water polo
- List of Olympic medalists in water polo (men)
- List of players who have appeared in multiple men's Olympic water polo tournaments
