= Stefano Postiglione =

Italian water polo player

Personal information
- Nationality: Italian
- Born: 7 December 1960 (age 65) Naples, Italy

Sport
- Sport: Water polo
Medal record
Representing Italy
World Championships
Silver medal – second place	1986 Madrid	Team competition
European Championships
Bronze medal – third place	1987 Strasbourg	Team competition

Stefano Postiglione (born 7 December 1960) is an Italian former water polo player. He competed at the 1984 Summer Olympics and the 1988 Summer Olympics.

== See also ==
- List of World Aquatics Championships medalists in water polo
