= Zoran Petrović (water polo) =

Serbian water polo player

Personal information
- Born: August 22, 1960 (age 65) Belgrade, SFR Yugoslavia
Medal record
Men's Water Polo
Representing Yugoslavia
Olympic Games
Gold medal – first place	1984 Los Angeles	Team competition
World Championships
Gold medal – first place	1986 Madrid	Team competition
European Championships
Silver medal – second place	1985 Sofia	Team competition

Zoran Petrović (Serbian Cyrillic: Зоран Петровић; born August 22, 1960) is a Serbian former water polo player. As a member of Yugoslavia's water polo team he won a gold medal at the 1984 Summer Olympics.

== See also ==
- Yugoslavia men's Olympic water polo team records and statistics
- List of Olympic champions in men's water polo
- List of Olympic medalists in water polo (men)
- List of world champions in men's water polo
- List of World Aquatics Championships medalists in water polo
