= Serghei Marcoci =

Soviet water polo player

Personal information
- Born: 13 January 1963 (age 63) Chișinău, Moldavian SSR, Soviet Union

Sport
- Sport: Water polo
Medal record
Representing the Soviet Union
Olympic Games
Bronze medal – third place	1988 Seoul	Team competition
World Championships
Bronze medal – third place	1986 Madrid	Team competition
Representing the Unified Team
Olympic Games
Bronze medal – third place	1992 Barcelona	Team competition
Representing Russia
World Championships
Bronze medal – third place	1994 Rome	Team competition

Sergey Markoch (Serghei Marcoci, born 13 January 1963) is a Moldovan-Russian former water polo player who competed in the 1988 Summer Olympics and in the 1992 Summer Olympics.

== See also ==
- List of Olympic medalists in water polo (men)
- List of World Aquatics Championships medalists in water polo
