= Andrea Pisano (water polo) =

Italian water polo player

Personal information
- Nationality: Italian
- Born: 5 May 1961 (age 65) La Spezia, Italy

Sport
- Sport: Water polo
Medal record
Representing Italy
World Championships
Silver medal – second place	1986 Madrid	Team competition
European Championships
Bronze medal – third place	1987 Strasbourg	Team competition
Bronze medal – third place	1989 Bonn	Team competition

Andrea Pisano (born 5 May 1961) is an Italian former water polo player. He competed at the 1984 Summer Olympics and the 1988 Summer Olympics.

== See also ==
- List of World Aquatics Championships medalists in water polo
