= Sandro Campagna =

Italian water polo player

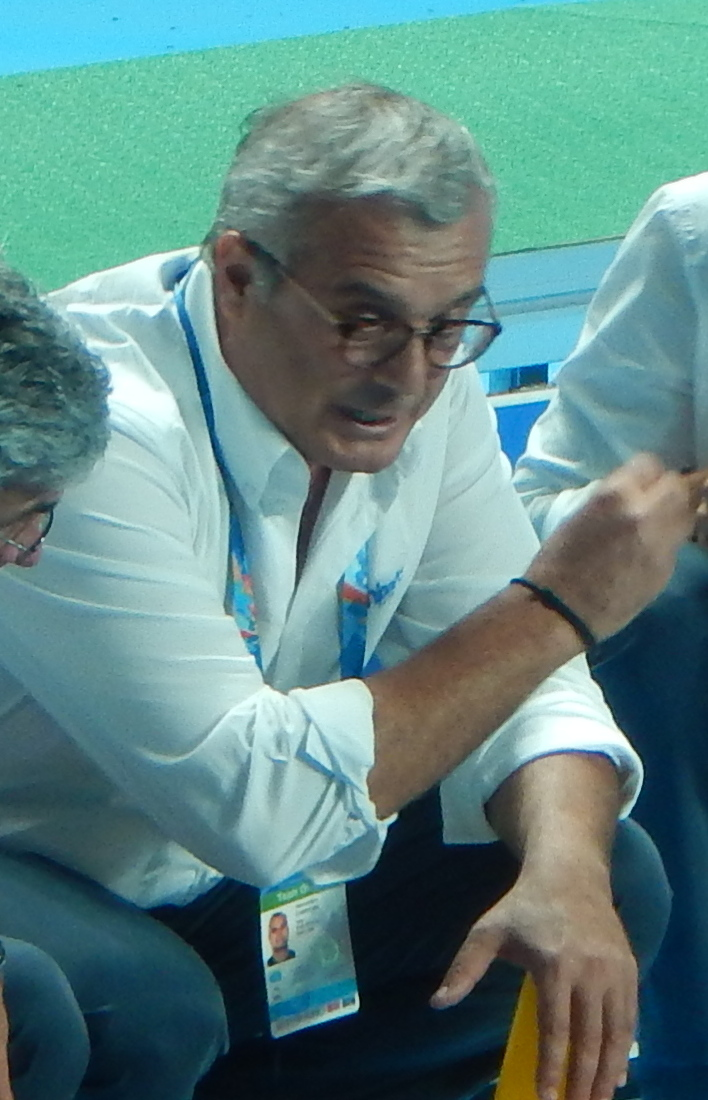
- Campagna as head coach of Italian men's national water polo team at 2015 World Aquatics Championships

Personal information
- Full name: Alessandro Campagna
- Born: 26 June 1963 (age 63) Siracusa, Italy
Medal record
Olympic Games
| Gold medal – first place | 1992 Barcelona | Team |
World Championships
| Gold medal – first place | 1994 Roma | Team |
| Silver medal – second place | 1986 Madrid | Team |
European Championships
| Gold medal – first place | 1993 Sheffield | Team |
| Bronze medal – third place | 1987 Strasbourg | Team |
| Bronze medal – third place | 1989 Bonn | Team |

Alessandro Campagna (born 26 June 1963) is an Italian former water polo player who competed at the 1988 and 1992 Summer Olympics. He is now the head coach of the Italy men's national water polo team.

== Career ==
Campagna won a gold medal at the Barcelona Olympics in 1992. As a head coach, he led Italy men's national team to win two medals in 2012 and 2016, becoming one of a few sportspeople who won Olympic medals in water polo as players and head coaches.

He was inducted into the International Swimming Hall of Fame in 2019.

== See also ==
- Italy men's Olympic water polo team records and statistics
- List of Olympic champions in men's water polo
- List of Olympic medalists in water polo (men)
- List of world champions in men's water polo
- List of World Aquatics Championships medalists in water polo
- List of members of the International Swimming Hall of Fame
