= Antonello Steardo =

Italian water polo player

Personal information
- Nationality: Italian
- Born: 27 August 1958 (age 67) Genoa, Italy

Sport
- Sport: Water polo
Medal record
Representing Italy
World Championships
Silver medal – second place	1986 Madrid	Team competition
European Championships
Bronze medal – third place	1987 Strasbourg	Team competition
Mediterranean Games
Gold medal – first place	1987 Latakia	Team competition
Silver medal – second place	1979 Split	Team competition

Antonello Steardo (born 27 August 1958) is an Italian former water polo player. He competed at the 1980 Summer Olympics, the 1984 Summer Olympics and the 1988 Summer Olympics.

== See also ==
- List of World Aquatics Championships medalists in water polo
