= Gianni Averaimo =

Italian water polo player

Personal information
- Born: 10 September 1964 (age 61) Genoa, Italy

Sport
- Sport: Water polo
Medal record
Representing Italy
Olympic Games
Gold medal – first place	1992 Barcelona	Team competition
World Championships
Gold medal – first place	1994 Rome	Team competition
Silver medal – second place	1986 Madrid	Team competition
European Championships
Gold medal – first place	1993 Sheffield	Team competition
Bronze medal – third place	1987 Strasbourg	Team competition
Bronze medal – third place	1989 Bonn	Team competition

Gianni Averaimo (born 10 September 1964) is an Italian former water polo player who competed in the 1988 Summer Olympics and in the 1992 Summer Olympics.

== See also ==
- Italy men's Olympic water polo team records and statistics
- List of Olympic champions in men's water polo
- List of Olympic medalists in water polo (men)
- List of men's Olympic water polo tournament goalkeepers
- List of world champions in men's water polo
- List of World Aquatics Championships medalists in water polo
