= Marco D'Altrui =

Italian water polo player

Personal information
- Born: 25 April 1964 (age 62) Naples, Italy
Medal record
Men's water polo
Representing Italy
Olympic Games
| Gold medal – first place | 1992 Barcelona | Team competition |
World Championships
| Gold medal – first place | 1994 Rome | Team competition |
| Silver medal – second place | 1986 Madrid | Team competition |
European Championships
| Gold medal – first place | 1993 Sheffield | Team competition |
| Bronze medal – third place | 1987 Strasbourg | Team competition |
| Bronze medal – third place | 1989 Bonn | Team competition |

Marco D'Altrui (born 25 April 1964) is an Italian water polo player. He competed at the 1984, 1988, and 1992 Summer Olympics. His father Giuseppe was a member of the Italian water polo team which won the gold medal in 1960.

== See also ==
- Italy men's Olympic water polo team records and statistics
- List of Olympic champions in men's water polo
- List of Olympic medalists in water polo (men)
- List of world champions in men's water polo
- List of World Aquatics Championships medalists in water polo
- List of members of the International Swimming Hall of Fame
