= Massimiliano Ferretti =

Italian water polo player

Personal information
- Born: June 22, 1966 (age 60) Rome, Italy

Sport
- Sport: Water polo
Medal record
Representing Italy
Olympic Games
| Gold medal – first place | 1992 Barcelona | Team competition |
World Championships
| Gold medal – first place | 1994 Rome | Team competition |
| Silver medal – second place | 1986 Madrid | Team competition |
European Championships
| Gold medal – first place | 1993 Sheffield | Team competition |
| Bronze medal – third place | 1987 Strasbourg | Team competition |
| Bronze medal – third place | 1989 Bonn | Team competition |

Massimiliano Ferretti (born 22 June 1966) is an Italian former water polo player who competed in the 1988 Summer Olympics and in the 1992 Summer Olympics.

== See also ==
- Italy men's Olympic water polo team records and statistics
- List of Olympic champions in men's water polo
- List of Olympic medalists in water polo (men)
- List of world champions in men's water polo
- List of World Aquatics Championships medalists in water polo
