= Water polo at the 1988 Summer Olympics =

Water polo at the Games of the XXIV Olympiad
- Venue: Jamsil Indoor Swimming Pool
- Dates: 21 September – 1 October 1988
- Competitors: 156 from 12 nations

Medalists
1st place, gold medalist(s)		Yugoslavia
2nd place, silver medalist(s)		United States
3rd place, bronze medalist(s)		Soviet Union

Water polo at the 1988 Summer Olympics as usual was part of the swimming sport, the other two being swimming and diving. They were not seen as three separate sports, because they all were governed by one federation — FINA. Water polo discipline consisted of one event: the men's team competition.

In the preliminary round twelve teams were divided into two groups. The two best teams from each group (shaded ones) advanced to the semi-finals. The two numbers three and four played classification matches to determine places 5 through 8, with the earlier result taken with them. The rest of the teams also played classification matches to determine places 9 through 12.

== Qualification ==
Qualification	Date	Host	Berths	Qualified
Host nation	30 September 1978	(West Germany) Baden-Baden	1	South Korea
1986 World Championships	14-22 August 1986	(Spain) Madrid	6	Yugoslavia
1986 World Championships	14-22 August 1986	(Spain) Madrid	6	Italy
1986 World Championships	14-22 August 1986	(Spain) Madrid	6	Soviet Union
1986 World Championships	14-22 August 1986	(Spain) Madrid	6	United States
1986 World Championships	14-22 August 1986	(Spain) Madrid	6	Spain
1986 World Championships	14-22 August 1986	(Spain) Madrid	6	West Germany
Intercontinental qualification	13-22 May 1988	(Australia) Perth	5	Hungary Australia France Greece China
Total			12	

== Preliminary round ==
=== Group A ===
Team	Pld	W	D	L	GF	GA	GD	Pts
West Germany	5	5	0	0	60	37	+23	10
Soviet Union	5	3	1	1	63	30	+33	7
Italy	5	3	1	1	48	33	+15	7
Australia	5	2	0	3	40	39	+1	4
France	5	1	0	4	43	54	−11	2
South Korea	5	0	0	5	14	75	−61	0

- 21 September
  - Italy 9-9 Soviet Union
  - France 16-5 South Korea
  - Australia 11-13 West Germany
- 22 September
  - South Korea 1-11 Italy
  - France 9-10 West Germany
  - Australia 4-11 Soviet Union
- 23 September
  - South Korea 2-18 West Germany
  - Australia 5-7 Italy
  - France 4-18 Soviet Union
- 26 September
  - Italy 7-10 West Germany
  - South Korea 4-17 Soviet Union
  - France 6-7 Australia
- 27 September
  - France 8-14 Italy
  - Australia 13-2 South Korea
  - Soviet Union 8-9 West Germany

=== Group B ===
Team	Pld	W	D	L	GF	GA	GD	Pts
United States	5	4	0	1	56	40	+16	8
Yugoslavia	5	4	0	1	60	38	+22	8
Spain	5	3	1	1	48	38	+10	7
Hungary	5	2	1	2	50	43	+7	5
Greece	5	1	0	4	45	66	−21	2
China	5	0	0	5	34	68	−34	0

- 21 September
  - Hungary 12-10 Greece
  - United States 7-6 Yugoslavia
  - China 6-13 Spain
- 22 September
  - Greece 10-7 China
  - United States 7-9 Spain
  - Hungary 9-10 Yugoslavia
- 23 September
  - United States 14-7 China
  - Greece 7-17 Yugoslavia
  - Hungary 6-6 Spain
- 26 September
  - United States 18-9 Greece
  - Hungary 14-7 China
  - Spain 8-10 Yugoslavia
- 27 September
  - Greece 9-12 Spain
  - Hungary 9-10 United States
  - Yugoslavia 17-7 China

== Final round ==
=== Semi finals ===
- 30 September
  - West Germany 10-14 Yugoslavia
  - Soviet Union 7-8 United States

=== Bronze medal match ===
- 1 October
  - West Germany 13-14 Soviet Union

=== Final ===
- 1 October
  - Yugoslavia 9-7 United States

=== Group D ===
Pos	Team	Pld	W	D	L	GF	GA	GD	Pts
5	Hungary	3	1	2	0	28	20	+8	4
6	Spain	3	1	1	1	24	23	+1	3
7	Italy	3	1	1	1	25	25	0	3
8	Australia	3	1	0	2	18	27	−9	2

- 30 September
  - Italy 9-9 Hungary
  - Australia 8-7 Spain
- 1 October
  - Australia 5-13 Hungary
  - Italy 9-11 Spain

=== Group E ===
Pos	Team	Pld	W	D	L	GF	GA	GD	Pts
9	Greece	3	3	0	0	37	21	+16	6
10	France	3	2	0	1	34	19	+15	4
11	China	3	1	0	2	25	28	−3	2
12	South Korea	3	0	0	3	19	47	−28	0

- 30 September
  - France 11-4 China
  - South Korea 7-17 Greece
- 1 October
  - South Korea 7-14 China
  - France 7-10 Greece

== Final ranking ==
Gold medal	Yugoslavia
Silver medal	United States
Bronze medal	Soviet Union
4	West Germany
5	Hungary
6	Spain
7	Italy
8	Australia
9	Greece
10	France
11	China
12	South Korea

=== Top goalscorers ===
Rank	Name	Goals
1	(Spain) Manuel Estiarte	27
2	(France) Pierre Garsau	20
3	(Hungary) András Gyöngyösi	19
4	(West Germany) Frank Otto	18
4	(Greece) Kyriakos Giannopoulos	18
4	(Greece) Antonis Aronis	18
7	(West Germany) Dirk Theismann	17
8	(Socialist Federal Republic of Yugoslavia) Igor Milanovic	16
8	(China) Yang Yong	16
10	(West Germany) Hagen Stamm	15
11	(Soviet Union) Dmitry Apanasenko	14
11	(Soviet Union) Giorgi Mshvenieradze	14
11	(Australia) Geoff Clark	14
14	(Spain) Jordi Sans	13
15	(United States) Jody Campbell	12
15	(Soviet Union) Sergey Kotenko	12
15	(Italy) Alessandro Campagna	12
15	(Italy) Massimiliano Ferretti	12

== See also ==
- 1986 FINA Men's World Water Polo Championship
- 1991 FINA Men's World Water Polo Championship

== Sources ==
- PDF documents in the LA84 Foundation Digital Library:
  - Official Report of the 1988 Olympic Games, v.2 (download, archive) (pp. 590–598)
- Water polo on the Olympedia website
  - Water polo at the 1988 Summer Olympics (men's tournament)
- Water polo on the Sports Reference website
  - Water polo at the 1988 Summer Games (men's tournament) (archived)
