= 2014–15 Serie A1 (men's water polo) =

Italy's premier water polo league

Serie A1
- Season: 2014–15
- Champions: Pro Recco; 29th title
- Relegated: Roma; Florentia
- Champions League: Pro Recco; Brescia; Sport Management
- Euro Cup: Acquachiara; Canottieri
- Matches: 158
- Goals: 2,988 (18.91 per match)
- Top goalscorer: Antonio Petković (81 goals)
- Biggest home win: Pro Recco 23–3 Roma; Brescia 24–4 Florentia
- Biggest away win: Florentia 3–24 Pro Recco
- Highest scoring: Lazio 14–19 Acquachiara

The 2014–15 Serie A1 is the 96th season of the Serie A1, Italy's premier Water polo league.

== Team information ==
Location of teams in 2014-15 Serie A1

The following 12 clubs compete in the Serie A1 during the 2014–15 season:

Serie A1
| Team | City | Pool | Founded | Colours |
| Acquachiara | Naples | Piscina Felipe Scandone | 1998 | |
| Brescia | Brescia | Centro Natatorio Mompiano | 1973 | |
| Bogliasco | Bogliasco | Stadio del Gianni Vassallo | 1951 | |
| Canottieri | Naples | Piscina Felipe Scandone | 1916 | |
| Como | Como | Piscina Olimpionica | 1919 | |
| Florentia | Florence | Piscina Goffredo Nannini | 1904 | |
| Lazio | Rome | Salaria Sport Village | 1904 | |
| Posillipo | Naples | Piscina Felipe Scandone | 1925 | |
| Pro Recco | Recco | Piscina comunale di Sori | 1913 | |
| Roma Vis Nova | Rome | Stadio Olimpico del Nuoto | 1979 | |
| Savona | Savona | Piscina Carlo Zanelli | 1948 | |
| Sport Management | Verona | Centro Natatorio Sportivo Belvedere | 1987 | |

== Regular season ==
=== Standings ===
| | Team | Pld | W | D | L | GF | GA | Diff | Pts |
|---|---|---|---|---|---|---|---|---|---|
| 1 | Pro Recco N.E PN | 22 | 21 | 0 | 1 | 330 | 128 | +202 | 63 |
| 2 | A.N. Brescia | 22 | 20 | 1 | 1 | 269 | 143 | +126 | 61 |
| 3 | Carpisa YamamaY Acquachiara | 22 | 16 | 2 | 4 | 248 | 208 | +40 | 50 |
| 4 | BPM PN Sport Management | 22 | 14 | 2 | 6 | 201 | 168 | +33 | 44 |
| 5 | Carisa Rari Nantes Savona | 22 | 11 | 1 | 10 | 189 | 204 | −15 | 34 |
| 6 | C.N. Posillipo | 22 | 10 | 2 | 10 | 198 | 188 | +10 | 32 |
| 7 | C.C. Napoli | 22 | 8 | 2 | 12 | 185 | 206 | −21 | 26 |
| 8 | R.N. Bogliasco | 22 | 8 | 0 | 14 | 195 | 237 | −42 | 24 |
| 9 | S.S. Lazio Nuoto | 22 | 7 | 1 | 14 | 224 | 268 | −44 | 22 |
| 10 | Como Nuoto | 22 | 6 | 1 | 15 | 156 | 212 | −56 | 19 |
| 11 | Roma Vis Nova PN | 22 | 3 | 1 | 18 | 167 | 255 | −88 | 10 |
| 12 | R.N. Florentia | 22 | 1 | 1 | 20 | 162 | 307 | −145 | 4 |

| Championship Playoff |
| Relegation |

Pld - Played; W - Won; D - Drawn; L - Lost; GF - Goals for; GA - Goals against; Diff - Difference; Pts - Points.

=== Schedule and results ===
1. round ( 2014.10.04 )
| Acquachiara – Roma Vis Nova | 11–7 |
| AN Brescia – Lazio | 18–6 |
| Como – Florentia | 12–6 |
| Posillipo – S.M. Verona | 5–6 |
| Pro Recco – Bogliasco | 16–6 |
| Savona – CC Napoli | 8–4 |

2. round ( 2014.10.11 )
| Bogliasco – Savona | 9–7 |
| CC Napoli – AN Brescia | 5–12 |
| Florentia – Pro Recco | 3–24 |
| Lazio – Posillipo | 12–13 |
| Roma Vis Nova – Como | 3–8 |
| S.M. Verona – Acquachiara | 11–9 |

3. round ( 2014.10.18 )
| Acquachiara – Lazio | 13–11 |
| AN Brescia – Savona | 7–4 |
| Como – S.M. Verona | 6–7 |
| Florentia – Bogliasco | 5–13 |
| Posillipo – CC Napoli | 6–8 |
| Pro Recco – Roma Vis Nova | 23–3 |

4. round ( 2014.10.25 )
| Bogliasco – AN Brescia | 8–15 |
| CC Napoli – Acquachiara | 8–13 |
| Lazio – Como | 8–9 |
| Roma Vis Nova – Florentia | 11–6 |
| Savona – Posillipo | 5–2 |
| S.M. Verona – Pro Recco | 6–8 |

5. round ( 2014.11.08 )
| Acquachiara – Savona | 11–6 |
| Como – CC Napoli | 6–8 |
| Florentia – S.M. Verona | 0–9 |
| Posillipo – AN Brescia | 8–10 |
| Pro Recco – Lazio | 19–5 |
| Roma Vis Nova – Bogliasco | 12–8 |

6. round ( 2014.11.15 )
| AN Brescia – Acquachiara | 7–4 |
| Bogliasco – Posillipo | 8–10 |
| CC Napoli – Pro Recco | 6–20 |
| Lazio – Florentia | 10–6 |
| Savona – Como | 8–8 |
| S.M. Verona – Roma Vis Nova | 13–8 |

7. round ( 2014.12.03 )
| Acquachiara – Posillipo | 10–6 |
| Como – AN Brescia | 3–9 |
| Florentia – CC Napoli | 9–12 |
| Pro Recco – Savona | 15–5 |
| Roma Vis Nova – Lazio | 9–11 |
| S.M. Verona – Bogliasco | 13–8 |

8. round ( 2014.12.06 )
| AN Brescia – Pro Recco | 7–6 |
| Bogliasco – Acquachiara | 12–13 |
| CC Napoli – Roma Vis Nova | 12–7 |
| Lazio – S.M. Verona | 8–8 |
| Posillipo – Como | 9–6 |
| Savona – Florentia | 17–4 |

9. round ( 2014.12.13 )
| Como – Acquachiara | 5–11 |
| Lazio – Bogliasco | 14–9 |
| Florentia – AN Brescia | 7–14 |
| Pro Recco – Posillipo | 8–6 |
| Roma Vis Nova – Savona | 5–7 |
| S.M. Verona – CC Napoli | 11–10 |

10. round ( 2014.12.20 )
| Acquachiara – Pro Recco | 6–14 |
| AN Brescia – Roma Vis Nova | 19–7 |
| CC Napoli – Lazio | 8–9 |
| Como – Bogliasco | 6–9 |
| Posillipo – Florentia | 10–10 |
| Savona – S.M. Verona | 11–9 |

11. round ( 2014.01.10 )
| Bogliasco – CC Napoli | 9–7 |
| Florentia – Acquachiara | 10–12 |
| Lazio – Savona | 12–13 |
| Pro Recco – Como | 16–5 |
| Roma Vis Nova – Posillipo | 9–10 |
| S.M. Verona – AN Brescia | 6–7 |

12. round ( 2015.01.17 )
| Roma Vis Nova – Acquachiara | 9–10 |
| Lazio – AN Brescia | 9–15 |
| Florentia – Como | 9–13 |
| S.M. Verona – Posillipo | 13–9 |
| Bogliasco – Pro Recco | 5–20 |
| CC Napoli – Savona | 10–4 |

13. round ( 2015.01.24 )
| Savona – Bogliasco | 12–9 |
| AN Brescia – CC Napoli | 13–9 |
| Pro Recco – Florentia | 16–5 |
| Posillipo – Lazio | 11–4 |
| Como – Roma Vis Nova | 9–8 |
| Acquachiara – S.M. Verona | 11–11 |

14. round ( 2015.01.31 )
| Lazio – Acquachiara | 14–19 |
| Savona – AN Brescia | 8–12 |
| S.M. Verona – Como | 9–3 |
| Bogliasco – Florentia | 10–6 |
| CC Napoli – Posillipo | 7–7 |
| Roma Vis Nova – Pro Recco | 4–21 |

15. round ( 2015.02.07 )
| AN Brescia – Bogliasco | 16–9 |
| Acquachiara – CC Napoli | 12–11 |
| Como – Lazio | 8–7 |
| Florentia – Roma Vis Nova | 14–11 |
| Posillipo – Savona | 12–7 |
| Pro Recco – S.M. Verona | 9–4 |

16. round ( 2015.02.21 )
| Savona – Acquachiara | 5–13 |
| CC Napoli – Como | 9–7 |
| S.M. Verona – Florentia | 15–9 |
| AN Brescia – Posillipo | 10–6 |
| Lazio – Pro Recco | 11–18 |
| Bogliasco – Roma Vis Nova | 11–6 |

17. round ( 2015.03.07 )
| Acquachiara – AN Brescia | 7–7 |
| Posillipo – Bogliasco | 16–7 |
| Pro Recco – CC Napoli | 12–6 |
| Florentia – Lazio | 11–16 |
| Como – Savona | 8–9 |
| Roma Vis Nova – S.M. Verona | 6–8 |

18. round ( 2015.03.11 )
| Posillipo – Acquachiara | 7–8 |
| AN Brescia – Como | 13–5 |
| CC Napoli – Florentia | 8–4 |
| Savona – Pro Recco | 7–13 |
| Lazio – Roma Vis Nova | 9–10 |
| Bogliasco – S.M. Verona | 5–6 |

19. round ( 2015.03.14 )
| Pro Recco – AN Brescia | 9–8 |
| Acquachiara – Bogliasco | 15–12 |
| Roma Vis Nova – CC Napoli | 7–7 |
| S.M. Verona – Lazio | 16–11 |
| Como – Posillipo | 7–12 |
| Florentia – Savona | 12–14 |

20. round ( 2015.03.21 )
| Acquachiara – Como | 12–11 |
| Bogliasco – Lazio | 7–10 |
| AN Brescia – Florentia | 24–4 |
| Posillipo – Pro Recco | 3–11 |
| Savona – Roma Vis Nova | 11–9 |
| CC Napoli – S.M. Verona | 5–7 |

21. round ( 2015.04.11 )
| Pro Recco – Acquachiara | 15–11 |
| Roma Vis Nova – AN Brescia | 7–16 |
| Lazio – CC Napoli | 14–17 |
| Bogliasco – Como | 13–4 |
| Florentia – Posillipo | 13–19 |
| S.M. Verona – Savona | 7–10 |

22. round ( 2015.04.18 )
| CC Napoli – Bogliasco | 8–9 |
| Acquachiara – Florentia | 17–9 |
| Savona – Lazio | 11–13 |
| Como – Pro Recco | 7–17 |
| Posillipo – Roma Vis Nova | 11–9 |
| AN Brescia – S.M. Verona | 10–6 |

== Championship playoff ==
Teams in bold won the playoff series. Numbers to the left of each team indicate the team's original playoff seeding. Numbers to the right indicate the score of each playoff game.

Quarterfinals
1 | **Pro Recco N.E PN** | **13** | **13**
8 | R.N. Bogliasco | 6 | 4
4 | **BPM PN Sport Management** | **5** | **9**
5 | Carisa Rari Nantes Savona | 4 | 8
2 | **A.N. Brescia** | **10** | **12**
7 | C.C. Napoli | 6 | 7
3 | **Carpisa YamamaY Acquachiara** | 6 | **11** | **12**
6 | C.N. Posillipo | **12** | 10 | 8

Semifinals
1 | **Pro Recco N.E PN** | **5^{5}** | **9**
4 | BPM PN Sport Management | 5^{3} | 6
2 | **A.N. Brescia** | **15** | **13**
3 | Carpisa YamamaY Acquachiara | 7 | 7

Final
1 | **Pro Recco N.E PN** | **8** | **10^{3}** | **11**
2 | A.N. Brescia | 4 | 10^{2} | 7
Third place
3 | Carpisa YamamaY Acquachiara | 13 | 5
4 | **BPM PN Sport Management** | **14** | **8**

=== Final ===
- **1st leg**

| 10 May; 20:45 (UTC+2) | Report | **Pro Recco N.E PN** | **8**–4 | A.N. Brescia | Piscina Comunale, Sori; Attendance: 1,000; Referees: Colombo, Severo |
| 10 May; 20:45 (UTC+2) | Report | Score by quarters: **1**–0, **3**–2, **2**–0, 2–2 | | | Piscina Comunale, Sori; Attendance: 1,000; Referees: Colombo, Severo |
| 10 May; 20:45 (UTC+2) | Report | Giorgetti, Aicardi 2 | **Goals** | Molina 3 | Piscina Comunale, Sori; Attendance: 1,000; Referees: Colombo, Severo |

- **2nd leg**

| 13 May; 19:00 (UTC+2) | Report | A.N. Brescia | 12–**13** (OT) | **Pro Recco N.E PN** | Piscina La Marmora, Brescia; Attendance: 1,000; Referees: Caputi, Ercoli |
| 13 May; 19:00 (UTC+2) | Report | Score by quarters: **5**–3, 1–**3**, 1–**3**, **3**–2 OT: pen. 2–**3** | | | Piscina La Marmora, Brescia; Attendance: 1,000; Referees: Caputi, Ercoli |
| 13 May; 19:00 (UTC+2) | Report | Molina 4 | **Goals** | Felugo, Fondelli 2 | Piscina La Marmora, Brescia; Attendance: 1,000; Referees: Caputi, Ercoli |

- **3rd leg**

| 16 May; 19:30 (UTC+2) | Report | **Pro Recco N.E PN** | **11**–7 | A.N. Brescia | Piscina Comunale, Sori; Attendance: 1,200; Referees: Gomez, Ceccarelli |
| 16 May; 19:30 (UTC+2) | Report | Score by quarters: 2–**3**, **4**–2, **2**–1, **3**–1 | | | Piscina Comunale, Sori; Attendance: 1,200; Referees: Gomez, Ceccarelli |
| 16 May; 19:30 (UTC+2) | Report | five players 2 | **Goals** | Rizzo 3 | Piscina Comunale, Sori; Attendance: 1,200; Referees: Gomez, Ceccarelli |

Pro Recco N.E PN won Championship final series 3–0.

=== 5th – 8th placement ===
Teams in bold won the playoff series. Numbers to the left of each team indicate the team's original playoff seeding. Numbers to the right indicate the score of each playoff game.

5th–8th placement semifinals
5 | Carisa Rari Nantes Savona | **11** | 4 | 3
8 | **R.N. Bogliasco** | 9 | **5** | **13**
6 | C.N. Posillipo | 7 | **7** | 5
7 | **C.C. Napoli** | **12** | 5 | **7**

5th place match
8 | R.N. Bogliasco | 12 | 8
7 | **C.C. Napoli** | **13** | **9**

== Season statistics ==
=== Top goalscorers ===
Updated to games played on 16 May 2015.

| Rank | Player | Team | Goals |
|---|---|---|---|
| 1 | (Croatia) Antonio Petković | Acquachiara | 81 |
| 2 | (Serbia) Andrija Prlainović | Pro Recco | 64 |
| 3 | (Montenegro) Darko Brguljan | Canottieri | 62 |
| 4 | (Montenegro) Aleksandar Radović | Posillipo | 60 |
| 5 | (Italy) Stefano Luongo | Acquachiara | 59 |
| 6 | (Italy) Michele Luongo | SM Verona | 58 |
| 7 | (Spain) Guillermo Molina | AN Brescia | 56 |
| 8 | (Italy) Valentino Gallo | Posillipo | 50 |
| 9 | (Serbia) Đorđe Filipović | SM Verona | 48 |
| 10 | (Italy) Valerio Rizzo | AN Brescia | 45 |

=== Number of teams by regions ===
| | Regions | No. teams | Teams |
|---|---|---|---|
| 1 | Campania | 3 | Acquachiara, Canottieri and Posillipo |
| 1 | Liguria | 3 | Bogliasco, Pro Recco and Savona |
| 3 | Lazio | 2 | Lazio and Roma Vis Nova |
| 3 | Lombardy | 2 | Brescia and Como |
| 5 | Tuscany | 1 | Florentia |
| 5 | Veneto | 1 | Sport Management |

== Final standing ==
| Qualified for the 2015–16 LEN Champions League |
| Qualified for the 2015–16 LEN Euro Cup |
| Relegation to the 2015–16 Serie A2 |

| Rank | Team |
|---|---|
| 1st place, gold medalist(s) | Pro Recco N.E PN |
| 2nd place, silver medalist(s) | A.N. Brescia |
| 3rd place, bronze medalist(s) | BPM PN Sport Management |
| 4 | Carpisa YamamaY Acquachiara |
| 5 | C.C. Napoli |
| 6 | R.N. Bogliasco |
| 7 | C.N. Posillipo |
| 8 | Carisa Rari Nantes Savona |
| 9 | S.S. Lazio Nuoto |
| 10 | Como Nuoto |
| 11 | Roma Vis Nova PN |
| 12 | R.N. Florentia |

2014-15 Serie A1 Champions
Pro Recco
29th Title

1 Stefano Tempesti (c), 2 Duško Pijetlović, 3 Andrija Prlainović, 4 Pietro Figlioli
5 Alex Giorgetti, 6 Maurizio Felugo, 7 Massimo Giacoppo, 8 Francesco Di Fulvio
9 Niccolò Figari, 10 Andrea Fondelli, 11 Matteo Aicardi
12 Niccolò Gitto, 13 Giacomo Pastorino
Head coach
Igor Milanović
