= 2017–18 Coppa Italia (men's water polo) =

Italian Cup

Tournament details
- Country: Italy
- Date: 29 September 2017 – 4 March 2018
- Teams: 14

The 2017–18 Coppa Italia is the 27th edition of the tournament.

== Schedule ==
The rounds of the 2017–18 competition are scheduled as follows:

Round	Matches
Round I	29 September–1 October 2017
Round II	7–9 November 2017
Final four	3–4 March 2018

== Round I ==
The first round ties are scheduled from 29 September to 1 October 2017.

=== Group A ===
Tournament will be played at Piscina Goffredo Nannini, Florence.

Team	Pld	W	D	L	GF	GA	GD	Pts
RN Florentia	4	3	1	0	30	24	+6	10
RN Savona	4	3	0	1	28	22	+6	9
Bogliasco Bene	4	2	0	2	35	28	+7	6
Reale Mutua Torino '81 Iren	4	1	1	2	25	32	−7	4
Pallanuoto Trieste	4	0	0	4	20	32	−12	0

=== Group B ===
Tournament will be played at Piscina Francesco Scudieri, Catania.

Team	Pld	W	D	L	GF	GA	GD	Pts
CC Ortigia	4	4	0	0	44	28	+16	12
CN Posillipo	4	2	0	2	44	33	+11	6
Seleco Nuoto Catania	4	2	0	2	46	34	+12	6
SS Lazio Nouto	4	2	0	2	44	42	+2	6
Acquachiara ATI 2000	4	0	0	4	24	65	−41	0

== Round II ==
The second round ties are scheduled from 6 to 8 October 2017.

=== Group C ===
Tournament will be played at Piscina Gianni Vassallo, Bogliasco.

Team	Pld	W	D	L	GF	GA	GD	Pts
Pro Recco N e PN	3	3	0	0	32	22	+10	9
Banco BPM Sport Management	3	2	0	1	22	21	+1	6
CC Ortigia	3	1	0	2	23	29	−6	3
RN Savona	3	0	0	3	13	18	−5	0

=== Group D ===
Tournament will be played at Centro Natatorio Mompiano, Brescia.

Team	Pld	W	D	L	GF	GA	GD	Pts
AN Brescia	3	3	0	0	42	18	+24	9
Canottieri Napoli	3	2	0	1	27	32	−5	6
RN Florentia	3	1	0	2	27	32	−5	3
CN Posillipo	3	0	0	3	20	34	−14	0

== See also ==
- 2017–18 Serie A1 (National Championship of Italy)
