= 2013–14 Serie A1 (men's water polo) =

Italy's premier water polo league

Serie A1
- Season: 2013–14
- Champions: Pro Recco; 28th title
- Relegated: Promogest Quartu; Albaro Nervi
- Champions League: Pro Recco; AN Brescia; Posillipo
- Euro Cup: Savona; Acquachiara
- Top goalscorer: Antonio Petković (79 goals)

The 2013–14 Serie A1 is the 95th season of the Serie A1, Italy's premier Water polo league.

== Team information ==
Locations of the 2013–14 Serie A1

The following 12 clubs compete in the Serie A1 during the 2013–14 season:

Serie A1
Team	City	Pool	Founded	Colours
Acquachiara	Naples	Piscina Felipe Scandone	1998	
AN Brescia	Brescia	Centro Natatorio Mompiano	1973	
Bogliasco	Bogliasco	Stadio Gianni Vassallo	1951	
Canottieri	Naples	Piscina Felipe Scandone	1916	
Como	Como	Piscina Olimpionica	1919	
Florentia	Florence	Piscina Goffredo Nannini	1904	
Lazio	Rome	Salaria Sport Village	1904	
Albaro Nervi	Albaro	Stadio di Albaro	2013	
Posillipo	Naples	Piscina Felipe Scandone	1925	
Promogest	Quartu Sant'Elena	Piscina Centro Nuoto	1991	
Pro Recco	Recco	Piscina comunale di Sori	1913	
Savona	Savona	Piscina Carlo Zanelli	1948	

== Regular season ==
=== Standings ===
	Team	Pld	W	D	L	GF	GA	Diff	Pts
1	Pro Recco	22	21	0	1	327	139	+188	63
2	AN Brescia	22	20	1	1	339	149	+190	61
3	CN Posillipo	22	14	2	6	212	186	+26	44
4	AS Acquachiara	22	14	0	8	227	213	+14	42
5	Rari Nantes Savona	22	13	1	8	252	216	+36	40
6	Circolo Canottieri Napoli	22	10	2	10	217	250	−33	32
7	Como Nuoto	22	8	1	13	198	244	−46	25
8	Rari Nantes Florentia	22	8	1	13	176	226	−50	25
9	S.S. Lazio Nuoto	22	8	0	14	215	268	−53	24
10	Rari Nantes Bogliasco	22	7	1	14	198	245	−47	22
11	Promogest Quartu	22	5	1	16	177	232	−55	16
12	Albaro Nervi	22	0	0	22	118	275	−157	0

Championship Playoff
Relegation

Pld - Played; W - Won; L - Lost; PF - Points for; PA - Points against; Diff - Difference; Pts - Points.
