= 2015–16 Serie A1 (men's water polo) =

Water polo league season

Serie A1
- Season: 2015-16
- Champions: Pro Recco; 30th title
- Top goalscorer: Antonio Petković (74 goals)

The 2015–16 Serie A1 is the 97th season of the Serie A1, Italy's premier Water polo league.

== Team information ==
Location of teams in 2015-16 Serie A1

The following 14 clubs compete in the Serie A1 during the 2015–16 season:

Serie A1
| Team | City | Pool | Founded | Colours |
| Acquachiara | Naples | Piscina Felipe Scandone | 1998 | |
| AN Brescia | Brescia | Centro Natatorio Mompiano | 1973 | |
| Bogliasco | Bogliasco | Stadio del nuoto Gianni Vassallo | 1951 | |
| Canottieri | Naples | Piscina Felipe Scandone | 1916 | |
| Florentia | Florence | Piscina Goffredo Nannini | 1904 | |
| Lazio | Rome | Salaria Sport Village | 1904 | |
| Ortigia | Syracuse | Piscina Paolo Caldarella | 1928 | |
| Posillipo | Naples | Piscina Felipe Scandone | 1925 | |
| Pro Recco | Recco | Piscina comunale di Sori | 1913 | |
| Roma Vis Nova | Rome | Stadio Olimpico del Nuoto | 1979 | |
| Savona | Savona | Piscina Carlo Zanelli | 1948 | |
| Sori | Sori | Piscina comunale di Sori | 1956 | |
| Sport Management | Verona | Centro Natatorio Sportivo Belvedere | 1987 | |
| Trieste | Trieste | Polo Natatorio Città di Trieste | 2003 | |

=== Head coaches ===
| Team | Head coach |
|---|---|
| Acquachiara | (Italy) Paolo De Crescenzo |
| AN Brescia | (Italy) Alessandro Bovo |
| Bogliasco | (Italy) Daniele Bettini |
| CC Napoli | (Italy) Paolo Zizza |
| Florentia | (Italy) Riccardo Vannini |
| Lazio | (Italy) Antonio Vittorioso |
| Ortigia | (Italy) Gino Leone |
| Posillipo | (Italy) Mauro Occhiello |
| Pro Recco | (Italy) Amedeo Pomilio |
| Roma Vis Nova | (Italy) Cristiano Ciocchetti |
| Savona | (Italy) Alberto Angelini |
| Sori | (Italy) Alessandro Cavallini |
| Sport Management | (Italy) Marco Baldineti |
| Trieste | (Italy) Stefano Piccardo |

== Regular season (Prima Fase) ==
| | Team | Pld | W | D | L | GF | GA | Diff | Pts |
|---|---|---|---|---|---|---|---|---|---|
| 1 | Pro Recco Nuoto E Palanuoto | 20 | 20 | 0 | 0 | 263 | 86 | +175 | 60 |
| 2 | A.N. Brescia | 20 | 19 | 0 | 1 | 255 | 126 | +129 | 57 |
| 3 | BPM PN Sport Management | 20 | 15 | 1 | 4 | 246 | 160 | +86 | 46 |
| 4 | C.C. Napoli | 20 | 12 | 3 | 5 | 186 | 180 | +6 | 39 |
| 5 | Robertozeno Posillipo | 20 | 12 | 0 | 8 | 184 | 158 | +26 | 36 |
| 6 | Carpisa YamamaY Acquachiara | 20 | 11 | 2 | 7 | 180 | 153 | +27 | 35 |
| 7 | Carisa R.N. Savona | 20 | 10 | 2 | 8 | 182 | 193 | −11 | 32 |
| 8 | Rari Nantes Bogliasco | 20 | 7 | 5 | 8 | 151 | 173 | −22 | 26 |
| 9 | Pallanuoto Trieste | 20 | 7 | 2 | 11 | 159 | 182 | −23 | 23 |
| 10 | Roma Vis Nova PN | 20 | 6 | 2 | 11 | 173 | 230 | −57 | 20 |
| 11 | C.C. Ortigia | 20 | 4 | 3 | 13 | 163 | 232 | −69 | 15 |
| 12 | S.S. Lazio Nuoto | 20 | 3 | 3 | 14 | 145 | 225 | −80 | 12 |
| 13 | Rari Nantes Florentia | 20 | 1 | 1 | 18 | 172 | 249 | −77 | 4 |
| 14 | Rari Nantes Sori | 20 | 1 | 0 | 19 | 111 | 223 | −112 | 3 |

| Championship Play-off |
| Relegation Play-out |
| Relegation |

Pld - Played; W - Won; D - Drawn; L - Lost; GF - Goals for; GA - Goals against; Diff - Difference; Pts - Points.

== Season statistics ==
=== Top goalscorers ===
As of matches played on 10 October 2015.

| Rank | Player | Team | Goals |
|---|---|---|---|
| 1 | (Croatia) Antonio Petković | Sport Management | 11 |
| 2 | (Italy) Edoardo Manzi | Sori | 10 |
| 3 | (Montenegro) Damjan Danilović | Ortigia | 9 |
| 3 | (Croatia) Jerko Marinić Kragić | Posillipo | 9 |
| 3 | (Italy) Christian Presciutti | AN Brescia | 9 |
| 3 | (Italy) Giacomo Cannella | Lazio | 9 |
| 7 | (Croatia) Sandro Sukno | Pro Recco | 8 |
| 7 | (Montenegro) Darko Brguljan | CC Napoli | 8 |
| 9 | (Spain) Guillermo Molina | AN Brescia | 7 |
| 9 | (Italy) Jacopo Colombo | Savona | 7 |

=== Number of teams by regions ===
| | Regions | No. teams | Teams |
|---|---|---|---|
| 1 | Liguria | 4 | Bogliasco, Pro Recco, Savona and Sori |
| 2 | Campania | 3 | Acquachiara, Canottieri and Posillipo |
| 3 | Lazio | 2 | Lazio and Roma Vis Nova |
| 4 | Friuli-Venezia Giulia | 1 | Trieste |
| 4 | Lombardy | 1 | AN Brescia |
| 4 | Sicily | 1 | Ortigia |
| 4 | Tuscany | 1 | Florentia |
| 4 | Veneto | 1 | Sport Management |

== See also ==
- 2015–16 LEN Champions League
- 2015–16 LEN Euro Cup
