= 2018–19 Serie A1 (men's water polo) =

Water polo league season

Serie A1
- Season: 2018–19
- Champions: Pro Recco (33rd title)
- Relegated: Bogliasco Bene; Nuoto Catania
- Champions League: Pro Recco; AN Brescia; Sport Management
- Euro Cup: CN Posillipo; CC Ortigia
- Top goalscorer: Stefano Luongo (81 goals)

The 2018–19 Serie A1 is the 100th season of the Serie A1, Italy's premier Water polo league.

== Team information ==
Location of teams in 2018–19 Serie A1

The following 14 clubs compete in the Serie A1 during the 2018–19 season:

Serie A1
Team	City	Pool	Founded	Colours
AN Brescia	Brescia	Centro natatorio Mompiano	1973	
Bogliasco	Bogliasco	Stadio del nuoto Gianni Vassallo	1951	
Canottieri	Naples	Piscina Circolo Canottieri Napoli	1916	
Catania	Catania	Piscina Comunale "F. Scuderi"	1939	
Florentia	Florence	Piscina Goffredo Nannini	1904	
Lazio	Rome	Stadio Olimpico del Nuoto	1900	
Ortiglia	Syracuse	Piscina Paolo Caldarella	1928	
Posillipo	Naples	Piscina "Alba Oriens" (Casoria)	1925	
Pro Recco	Recco	Piscina Comunale (Sori)	1913	
Quinto	Genoa	Stadio del Nuoto di Albaro	1921	
Roma	Rome	Stadio Olimpico del Nuoto	2008	
Savona	Savona	Piscina Carlo Zanelli	1948	
Sport Management	Busto Arsizio	Piscine Manara	1987	
Trieste	Trieste	Polo Natatorio "Bruno Bianchi"	2003	

== Regular season ==
	Team	Pld	W	D	L	GF	GA	Diff	Pts	Qualification	Head-to-head
1	AN Brescia	26	25	0	1	347	155	+192	75	Qualification for the Playoffs	
2	Pro Recco	26	24	0	2	399	135	+264	72	Qualification for the Playoffs	
3	Sport Management	26	22	0	4	337	185	+152	66	Qualification for the Playoffs	
4	CN Posillipo	26	13	4	9	232	215	+17	43	Qualification for the Playoffs	
5	CC Ortigia	26	11	2	13	212	246	−34	35	Qualification for the Playoffs	
6	Roma Nuoto	26	11	1	14	210	231	−21	34	Qualification for the Playoffs	
7	Lazio Nuoto	26	10	1	15	189	279	−90	31		LAZ: 15 pts QUI: 7 pts FLO: 6 pts SAV: 4 pts
8	Iren Genova Quinto	26	10	1	15	199	255	−56	31		LAZ: 15 pts QUI: 7 pts FLO: 6 pts SAV: 4 pts
9	RN Florentia	26	10	1	15	212	258	−46	31		LAZ: 15 pts QUI: 7 pts FLO: 6 pts SAV: 4 pts
10	RN Savona	26	9	4	13	154	225	−71	31		LAZ: 15 pts QUI: 7 pts FLO: 6 pts SAV: 4 pts
11	CC Napoli	26	9	2	15	207	264	−57	29		
12	Pallanuoto Trieste	26	9	1	17	217	291	−74	27		
13	Bogliasco Bene	26	5	1	20	194	274	−80	16	Relegation to Serie A2	BOG - CAT: 17–11; CAT - BOG: 15–9
14	Nuoto Catania	26	5	1	20	191	287	−96	16	Relegation to Serie A2	BOG - CAT: 17–11; CAT - BOG: 15–9

Pld - Played; W - Won; D - Drawn; L - Lost; GF - Goals for; GA - Goals against; Diff - Difference; Pts - Points.

== Playoffs ==
The final six was held on 23–26 May 2019 at the Bruno Bianchi Swimming Stadium in Trieste.

Quarter-finals
4	Posillipo	10
5	Ortigia	7
3	Sport Management	14
6	Roma	6

Semi-finals
1	AN Brescia	9
4	Posillipo	7
2	Pro Recco	11
3	Sport Management	3

Final
1	AN Brescia	10
2	Pro Recco	11
Third place
4	Posillipo	9
3	Sport Management	11

=== Semi-finals ===
24 May 2019; 17:30 (CEST)	Report	AN Brescia	9–7	CN Posillipo	Polo Natatorio "Bruno Bianchi", Trieste; Attendance: 500; Referees: Paoletti, Ercoli
24 May 2019; 17:30 (CEST)	Report	Score by quarters: 2–2, 2-1, 3–2, 2–2			Polo Natatorio "Bruno Bianchi", Trieste; Attendance: 500; Referees: Paoletti, Ercoli
24 May 2019; 17:30 (CEST)	Report	Nora 2	Goals	Manzi 3	Polo Natatorio "Bruno Bianchi", Trieste; Attendance: 500; Referees: Paoletti, Ercoli

24 May 2019; 18:45 (CEST)	Report	Pro Recco	11–3	Sport Management	Polo Natatorio "Bruno Bianchi", Trieste; Attendance: 500; Referees: Petronilli, Lo Dico
24 May 2019; 18:45 (CEST)	Report	Score by quarters: 2–2, 3–1, 0–3, 2–1			Polo Natatorio "Bruno Bianchi", Trieste; Attendance: 500; Referees: Petronilli, Lo Dico
24 May 2019; 18:45 (CEST)	Report	Echenique 3	Goals	Fondelli, Drašović, Luongo 1	Polo Natatorio "Bruno Bianchi", Trieste; Attendance: 500; Referees: Petronilli, Lo Dico

=== Third place ===
25 May 2019; 18:30 (CEST)	Report	CN Posillipo	9–11	Sport Management	Polo Natatorio "Bruno Bianchi", Trieste; Attendance: 400; Referees: Štampalija (CRO), Bianco
25 May 2019; 18:30 (CEST)	Report	Score by quarters: 1–5, 2–0, 2–3, 4–3			Polo Natatorio "Bruno Bianchi", Trieste; Attendance: 400; Referees: Štampalija (CRO), Bianco
25 May 2019; 18:30 (CEST)	Report	G. Di Martire, Marziali 2	Goals	Drašović, Bruni, Mirarchi 2	Polo Natatorio "Bruno Bianchi", Trieste; Attendance: 400; Referees: Štampalija (CRO), Bianco

=== Final ===
26 May 2019; 16:00 (CEST)	Report	AN Brescia	10–11	Pro Recco	Polo Natatorio "Bruno Bianchi", Trieste; Attendance: 1,000; Referees: Severo, Gomez
26 May 2019; 16:00 (CEST)	Report	Score by quarters: 3–4, 2–2, 2–4, 3–1			Polo Natatorio "Bruno Bianchi", Trieste; Attendance: 1,000; Referees: Severo, Gomez
26 May 2019; 16:00 (CEST)	Report	Presciutti, Figlioli, Gallo 2	Goals	Ivović 3	Polo Natatorio "Bruno Bianchi", Trieste; Attendance: 1,000; Referees: Severo, Gomez

==== Final standings ====
	Team	Qualification or Relegation
1st place, gold medalist(s)	Pro Recco	Champions League preliminary round
2nd place, silver medalist(s)	AN Brescia	Champions League second qualifying round
3rd place, bronze medalist(s)	Sport Management	Champions League first qualifying round
4	CN Posillipo	Euro Cup first qualifying round
5	CC Ortigia	Euro Cup first qualifying round
6	AS Roma Nuoto	

2019 Serie A1
Winner
Pro Recco
33rd title

== Season statistics ==
=== Top goalscorers ===
As of 10 June 2019.

Rank	Player	Team	Goals
1	(Italy) Stefano Luongo	Sport Management	81
2	(Italy) Pietro Figlioli	AN Brescia	67
3	(Italy) Gonzalo Echenique	Pro Recco	59
3	(Montenegro) Aleksandar Ivović	Pro Recco	59
5	(Malta) Steven Camilleri	Roma	54
6	(Italy) Francesco Di Fulvio	Pro Recco	53
7	(Netherlands) Robin Lindhout	Quinto	48
8	(Italy) Giacomo Lanzoni	Bogliasco	47
8	(Italy) Eduardo Campopiano	CC Napoli	47
10	(Serbia) Draško Gogov	Trieste	45
