= Matteo Aicardi =

Italian water polo center forward

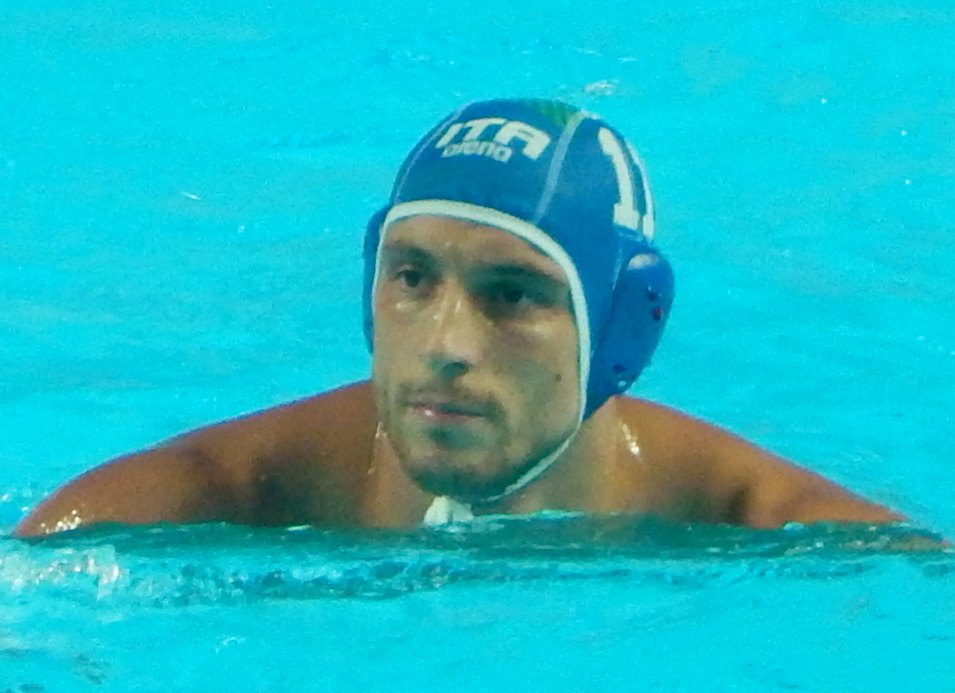
- Aicardi at the 2015 World Championships

Personal information
- Born: 19 April 1986 (age 40) Finale Ligure, Italy m
- Height: 1.94
- Weight: 104 kg (229 lb)

Sport
- Sport: Water polo
- Handedness: Right
- Position: Center forward
- Current club: Pro Recco

Senior clubs
- Years: Team
- 2002–2004: Imperia
- 2004–2006: Camogli
- 2006–2012: Savona
- 2012–: Pro Recco
Medal record
Representing Italy
Olympic Games
Silver medal – second place	2012 London	Team
Bronze medal – third place	2016 Rio de Janeiro	Team
World Championships
Gold medal – first place	2011 Shanghai	Team
Gold medal – first place	2019 Gwandong	Team
European Championships
Bronze medal – third place	2014 Budapest	Team

Matteo Aicardi (born 19 April 1986) is an Italian professional water polo center forward. He won the world title in 2011 and two medals at the 2012 and 2016 Olympics. In 2012 he was awarded the Gold Collar of Sporting Merit from the Italian Olympic Committee.

== Honours ==
=== Club ===
Savona

- LEN Euro Cup: 2010–11, 2011–12

Pro Recco

- LEN Champions League: 2014–15, 2020–21, 2021–22; runners-up : 2017–18
- LEN Super Cup: 2015, 2021, 2022
- Serie A: 2012–13, 2013–14, 2014–15, 2015–16, 2016–17, 2017–18, 2018–19, 2021–22
- Coppa Italia: 2012–13, 2013–14, 2014–15, 2015–16, 2016–17, 2017–18, 2018–19, 2020–21, 2021–22

== See also ==
- List of Olympic medalists in water polo (men)
- List of world champions in men's water polo
- List of World Aquatics Championships medalists in water polo
