= 2015–16 Országos Bajnokság I (men's water polo) =

Water polo league season

OB I
- Season: 2015–16
- Champions: Szolnoki Dózsa-KÖZGÉP (8th title)
- Relegated: No team relegated
- Champions League: Szolnoki Dózsa-KÖZGÉP; ZF-Eger; A-HÍD OSC Újbuda
- Euro Cup: FTC-PQS Waterpolo; BVSC-Wáberer Hungária-Zugló
- Top goalscorer: Bence Bátori, Dániel Francsics (61 goals)

The 2015–16 Országos Bajnokság I (known as the e·on férfi OB I osztályú Országos Bajnokság for sponsorship reasons) was the 110th season of the Országos Bajnokság I, Hungary's premier Water polo league.

== Team information ==
Location of teams in 2015-16 Országos Bajnokság I
Budapest OB I waterpolo teams

The following 16 clubs compete in the OB I during the 2015–16 season:

OB I
Team	City	Pool	Founded	Colours
BVSC	Budapest	Szőnyi úti uszoda	1911	
Debrecen	Debrecen	Debreceni Sportuszoda	2006	
Eger	Eger	Bitskey Aladár uszoda	1910	
FTC	Budapest	Népligeti uszoda	1899	
Honvéd	Budapest	Kőér utcai uszoda	1950	
Kaposvár	Kaposvár	Virágfürdő	1999	
KSI	Budapest	Széchy Tamás uszoda	1963	
Miskolc	Miskolc	Kemény Dénes Sportuszoda	2012	
OSC	Budapest	Nyéki Imre uszoda	1957	
PVSK	Pécs	Abay Nemes Oszkár Sportuszoda	1997	
Szeged	Szeged	Szegedi Sportuszoda	1993	
Szentes	Szentes	Szentesi uszoda	1934	
Szolnok	Szolnok	Tiszaligeti uszoda	1921	
TVSE	Tatabánya	Tatabányai Sportuszoda	1992	
UVSE	Budapest	Hajós Alfréd Sportuszoda	2008	
Vasas	Budapest	Komjádi Béla Sportuszoda	1945	

=== Head coaches ===
Team	Head coach
BVSC	(Hungary) Tamás Märcz
Debrecen	(Hungary) Tamás Varga
Eger	(Hungary) Norbert Dabrowski
FTC	(Hungary) Zsolt Varga
Honvéd	(Hungary) Lajos Vad
Kaposvár	(Hungary) Zoltán Szécsi
KSI	(Hungary) János Horváth
MVLC	(Hungary) Dr. József Sike
OSC	(Hungary) Dr. Balázs Vincze
PVSK	(Hungary) Gergely Lukács
Szeged	(Hungary) Péter Varga
Szentes	(Hungary) Dénes Lukács
Szolnok	(Hungary) Sándor Cseh
Tatabánya	(Hungary) Tamás Zantleitner
UVSE	(Hungary) Zsolt Németh
Vasas	(Hungary) László Földi

== Regular season (Alapszakasz) ==
=== Group A (A csoport) ===
	Team	Pld	W	D	L	GF	GA	Diff	Pts
1	Szolnoki Dózsa-KÖZGÉP	14	14	0	0	202	85	+117	42
2	ZF-Eger	14	12	0	2	190	98	+92	36
3	ContiTech-Szeged Diapolo	14	8	0	6	144	138	+6	24
4	BVSC-Wáberer Hungária-Zugló	14	7	2	5	139	139	0	23
5	PannErgy-MVLC	14	5	1	8	125	167	−42	16
6	Valdor Szentes	14	4	2	8	125	177	−52	14
7	Kaposvári Vizilabda Klub	14	2	1	11	87	141	−54	7
8	EBP Tatabánya	14	1	0	13	107	172	−67	3

Championship Round
Relegation Round

Pld - Played; W - Won; D - Drawn; L - Lost; GF - Goals for; GA - Goals against; Diff - Difference; Pts - Points.

==== Schedule and results ====
1. round ( 2015.09.23. )
Kaposvár – BVSC	7-7
Szeged – Szentes	16-8
Szolnok – Tatabánya	19-4
Eger – MVLC	13-7

2. round ( 2015.09.26. )
BVSC – Szentes	12-9
Eger – Tatabánya	17-9
Kaposvár – MVLC	7-8
Szeged – Szolnok	6-13

3. round ( 2015.10.03. – 10.07. )
Szentes – Tatabánya	11-9
MVLC – BVSC	11-9
Szolnok – Kaposvár	16-1
Eger – Szeged	15-7

4. round ( 2015.10.10. )
Kaposvár – Eger	5-18
BVSC – Szolnok	8-12
Szentes – MVLC	9-9
Szeged – Tatabánya	12-5

5. round ( 2015.10.17. – 10.24. )
Tatabánya – MVLC	11-10
Eger – BVSC	14-6
Szolnok – Szentes	17-6
Szeged – Kaposvár	10-6

6. round ( 2015.11.04. )
BVSC – Szeged	14-11
MVLC – Szolnok	8-17
Szentes – Eger	5-16
Tatabánya – Kaposvár	7-8

7. round ( 2015.11.07. – 11.08. )
Tatabánya – BVSC	6-10
MVLC – Szeged	7-12
Szolnok – Eger	9-4
Szentes – Kaposvár	8-7

8. round ( 2015.11.14. – 11.25. )
BVSC – Kaposvár	11-8
Tatabánya – Szolnok	8-13
MVLC – Eger	7-17
Szentes – Szeged	8-14

9. round ( 2015.12.05. – 12.08. )
Szentes – BVSC	11-11
MVLC – Kaposvár	10-4
Szolnok – Szeged	18-9
Tatabánya – Eger	6-17

10. round ( 2016.01.30. )
Kaposvár – Szolnok	5-11
Tatabánya – Szentes	11-14
Szeged – Eger	8-12
BVSC – MVLC	14-12

11. round ( 2016.02.06. )
Tatabánya – Szeged	9-11
Szolnok – BVSC	12-6
MVLC – Szentes	14-13
Eger – Kaposvár	11-8

12. round ( 2016.02.13. )
Kaposvár – Szeged	8-11
MVLC – Tatabánya	10-8
Szentes – Szolnok	9-16
BVSC – Eger	7-12

13. round ( 2016.02.19. )
Kaposvár – Tatabánya	6-5
Eger – Szentes	18-6
Szeged – BVSC	5-8
Szolnok – MVLC	21-5

14. round ( 2016.02.21. )
Kaposvár – Szentes	7-8
Eger – Szolnok	6-8
BVSC – Tatabánya	16-9
Szeged – MVLC	12-7

=== Group B (B csoport) ===
	Team	Pld	W	D	L	GF	GA	Diff	Pts	Head-to-head
1	A-HÍD OSC Újbuda	14	12	0	2	164	82	+82	36	
2	FTC-PQS Waterpolo	14	11	0	3	153	101	+52	33	
3	RacioNet Honvéd	14	10	1	3	135	103	+32	31	
4	VasasPlaket	14	7	2	5	141	145	−4	23	
5	Debrecen	14	7	1	6	119	109	+10	22	
6	PVSK-Mecsek Füszért	14	3	0	11	121	147	−26	9	PVSK 9–12 UVSE; UVSE 7–10 PVSK
7	UVSE-Hunguest Hotels	14	3	0	11	114	154	−40	9	PVSK 9–12 UVSE; UVSE 7–10 PVSK
8	KSI SE	14	1	0	13	83	189	−106	3	

Championship Round
Relegation Round

Pld - Played; W - Won; D - Drawn; L - Lost; GF - Goals for; GA - Goals against; Diff - Difference; Pts - Points.

==== Schedule and results ====
1. round ( 2015.09.23. )
KSI – FTC	6-16
PVSK – OSC	7-13
Honvéd – UVSE	12-10
Vasas – Debrecen	9-8

2. round ( 2015.09.26. )
Debrecen – UVSE	8-5
FTC – PVSK	15-12
Honvéd – OSC	3-10
KSI – Vasas	8-14

3. round ( 2015.10.03. – 10.07. )
KSI – Debrecen	4-12
FTC – Honvéd	7-8
OSC – Vasas	16-7
PVSK – UVSE	9-12

4. round ( 2015.10.10. )
FTC – Vasas	10-3
Honvéd – PVSK	11-4
Debrecen – OSC	7-5
UVSE – KSI	9-6

5. round ( 2015.10.17. – 10.24. )
Honvéd – Vasas	13-9
PVSK – KSI	13-4
FTC – Debrecen	10-7
OSC – UVSE	14-7

6. round ( 2015.11.04. )
UVSE – FTC	8-12
Honvéd – Debrecen	8-5
PVSK – Vasas	8-9
OSC – KSI	14-3

7. round ( 2015.11.07. – 11.08. )
Honvéd – KSI	12-2
PVSK – Debrecen	4-10
UVSE – Vasas	11-14
OSC – FTC	8-7

8. round ( 2015.11.14. – 11.25. )
Debrecen – Vasas	9-9
FTC – KSI	16-7
OSC – PVSK	7-5
UVSE – Honvéd	7-8

9. round ( 2015.12.05. – 12.08. )
UVSE – Debrecen	7-8
Vasas – KSI	16-6
PVSK – FTC	10-16
OSC – Honvéd	7-10

10. round ( 2016.01.30. )
Debrecen – KSI	14-6
Vasas – OSC	3-13
Honvéd – FTC	2-5
UVSE – PVSK	7-10

11. round ( 2016.02.06. )
OSC – Debrecen	13-5
KSI – UVSE	8-10
PVSK – Honvéd	12-10
Vasas – FTC	7-15

12. round ( 2016.02.13. )
KSI – PVSK	11-8
Debrecen – FTC	7-8
Vasas – Honvéd	11-11
UVSE – OSC	7-15

13. round ( 2016.02.19. )
FTC – UVSE	12-7
Debrecen – Honvéd	9-12
KSI – OSC	7-20
Vasas – PVSK	12-10

14. round ( 2016.02.21. )
KSI – Honvéd	5-15
Debrecen – PVSK	10-9
FTC – OSC	4-9
Vasas – UVSE	18-7

== Second round (Középszakasz) ==
=== Championship round (Felsőház) ===
	Team	Pld	W	D	L	GF	GA	Diff	Pts	Qualification or relegation
1	Szolnoki Dózsa-KÖZGÉP	8	8	0	0	109	50	+59	66	Match for the Final
2	ZF-Eger	8	6	2	0	107	70	+37	56	Match for the Final
3	A-HÍD OSC Újbuda	8	4	0	4	89	75	+14	48	Match for 3rd place
4	FTC-PQS Waterpolo	8	3	1	4	69	92	−23	43	Match for 3rd place
5	ContiTech-Szeged Diapolo	8	4	0	4	77	67	+10	36	Match for 5th place
6	BVSC-Wáberer Hungária-Zugló	8	3	1	4	80	87	−7	33	Match for 5th place
7	RacioNet Honvéd	8	0	1	7	57	84	−27	32	Match for 7th place
8	VasasPlaket	8	1	1	6	59	122	−63	27	Match for 7th place

==== Schedule and results ====
1. round
OSC − BVSC	14-6	Kondorosi u.
Szolnok − Vasas	15-6	Tiszaliget
Eger − Honvéd	15-8	Eger-Bitskey
FTC − Szeged	12-11	Népliget

2. round
Szolnok − FTC	19-10	Tiszaliget
BVSC − Honvéd	14-9	Szőnyi u.
Vasas − Szeged	4-16	Komjádi
OSC − Eger	9-11	Kondorosi u.

3. round
Szeged − OSC	5-12	Szegedi Sportu.
Eger − Vasas	19-9	Eger-Bitskey
Honvéd − Szolnok	4-10	Kőér u.
FTC − BVSC	10-6	Népliget

4. round
Honvéd − Szeged	7-8	Kőér u.
Eger − FTC	15-7	Eger-Bitskey
Vasas − BVSC	11-11	Komjádi
Szolnok − OSC	13-10	Tiszaliget

5. round
Szeged − FTC	7-8	Szegedi Sportu.
Vasas − Szolnok	3-19	Komjádi
BVSC − OSC	11-16	Szőnyi u.
Honvéd − Eger	11-11	Kőér u.

6. round
Szeged − Vasas	16-4	Szegedi Sportu.
Eger − OSC	11-7	Eger-Bitskey
FTC − Szolnok	5-13	Népliget
Honvéd − BVSC	7-10	Kőér u.

7. round
Szolnok − Honvéd	10-6	Tiszaliget
Vasas − Eger	9-15	Komjádi
OSC − Szeged	15-8	Kondorosi u.
BVSC − FTC	11-7	Szőnyi u.

8. round
Szeged − Honvéd	6-5	Szegedi Sportu.
BVSC − Vasas	15-17	Szőnyi u.
FTC − Eger	10-10	Népliget
OSC − Szolnok	6-10	Kondorosi u.

=== Relegation round (Alsóház) ===
	Team	Pld	W	D	L	GF	GA	Diff	Pts	Qualification or relegation
9	Debrecen	8	4	2	2	84	71	+13	36	Match for 9th place
10	PannErgy-MVLC	8	5	0	3	89	75	+14	31	Match for 9th place
11	Valdor Szentes	8	5	1	2	80	76	+4	30	Match for 11th place
12	Kaposvári Vizilabda Klub	8	5	2	1	84	71	+13	24	Match for 11th place
13	PVSK-Mecsek Füszért	8	4	1	3	74	69	+5	22	Match for 13th place
14	UVSE-Hunguest Hotels	8	2	2	4	75	83	−8	17	Match for 13th place
15	EBP Tatabánya	8	1	3	4	63	74	−11	9	Match for 15th place
16	KSI SE	8	0	1	7	63	93	−30	4	Match for 15th place

==== Schedule and results ====
1. round
Tatabánya − Debrecen	9-9	Tatabánya
MVLC − KSI	14-7	Miskolc-Kemény
Szentes − UVSE	13-11	Szentes
PVSK − Kaposvár	9-11	Pécs-Abay

2. round
KSI − Kaposvár	7-11	Komjádi
Tatabánya − UVSE	9-9	Tatabánya
Debrecen − Szentes	18-13	Debrecen
MVLC − PVSK	9-8	Miskolc-Kemény

3. round
Kaposvár − Debrecen	7-7	Kaposvár
Szentes − KSI	13-11	Szentes
UVSE − MVLC	10-7	Hajós A.
PVSK − Tatabánya		Pécs-Abay

4. round
KSI − Tatabánya	7-7	Komjádi
Szentes − PVSK	6-6	Szentes
UVSE − Kaposvár	10-10	Hajós A.
Debrecen − MVLC	8-9	Debrecen

5. round
Debrecen − Tatabánya	13-8	Debrecen
KSI − MVLC	12-17	Komjádi
Kaposvár − PVSK	14-11	Kaposvár
UVSE − Szentes	10-11	Hajós A.

6. round
Kaposvár − KSI	11-7	Kaposvár
Szentes − Debrecen	8-6	Szentes
UVSE − Tatabánya	8-6	Hajós A.
PVSK − MVLC	10-9	Pécs-Abay

7. round
KSI − Szentes	5-8	Komjádi
Tatabánya − PVSK	6-9	Tatabánya
MVLC − UVSE	16-7	Miskolc-Kemény
Debrecen − Kaposvár	10-9	Debrecen

8. round
Kaposvár − UVSE	11-10	Kaposvár
Tatabánya − KSI	12-7	Tatabánya
MVLC − Debrecen	8-13	Miskolc-Kemény
PVSK − Szentes	9-8	Pécs-Abay

== Placement matches (Helyosztók) ==
=== Final ===
1st placed team hosted Games 1 and Game 3, plus Game 5 if necessary. 2nd placed team hosted Game 2, plus Game 4 if necessary.

1st placed team	Agg.	2nd placed team	Game 1	Game 2	Game 3	Game 4	Game 5
Szolnoki Dózsa-KÖZGÉP	3–2	ZF-Eger	9–6	11–8 (p)	9–12	7–8	10–8

- 1st leg

7 May; 16:30	Report	Szolnoki Dózsa-KÖZGÉP	9–6	ZF-Eger	Tiszaligeti uszoda, Szolnok; Attendance: 1,100; Referees: Kun, Németh
7 May; 16:30	Report	Score by quarters: 2–1, 3–0, 2–2, 2–3			Tiszaligeti uszoda, Szolnok; Attendance: 1,100; Referees: Kun, Németh
7 May; 16:30	Report	Vámos 2	Goals	Hárai, Zalánki 2	Tiszaligeti uszoda, Szolnok; Attendance: 1,100; Referees: Kun, Németh

- 2nd leg

15 May; 20:30	Report	ZF-Eger	8–11 (OT)	Szolnoki Dózsa-KÖZGÉP	Bitskey Aladár uszoda, Eger; Attendance: 2,500; Referees: Székely, Petik
15 May; 20:30	Report	Score by quarters: 1–1, 3–3, 1–0, 2–3 OT: pen. 1–4			Bitskey Aladár uszoda, Eger; Attendance: 2,500; Referees: Székely, Petik
15 May; 20:30	Report	Szívós, Zalánki 2	Goals	Vámos, Dé. Varga, Mitrović 3	Bitskey Aladár uszoda, Eger; Attendance: 2,500; Referees: Székely, Petik

- 3rd leg

21 May; 15:00	Report	Szolnoki Dózsa-KÖZGÉP	9–12	ZF-Eger	Tiszaligeti uszoda, Szolnok; Attendance: 1,100; Referees: dr. Molnár, Molnár
21 May; 15:00	Report	Score by quarters: 2–3, 2–3, 3–3, 2–3			Tiszaligeti uszoda, Szolnok; Attendance: 1,100; Referees: dr. Molnár, Molnár
21 May; 15:00	Report	Vámos, Mitrović 2	Goals	M. Ćuk, Vapenski 3	Tiszaligeti uszoda, Szolnok; Attendance: 1,100; Referees: dr. Molnár, Molnár

- 4th leg

25 May; 20:00	Report	ZF-Eger	8–7	Szolnoki Dózsa-KÖZGÉP	Bitskey Aladár uszoda, Eger; Attendance: 2,200; Referees: dr. Molnár, Molnár
25 May; 20:00	Report	Score by quarters: 2–0, 2–2, 2–3, 2–2			Bitskey Aladár uszoda, Eger; Attendance: 2,200; Referees: dr. Molnár, Molnár
25 May; 20:00	Report	Erdélyi 3	Goals	seven players 1	Bitskey Aladár uszoda, Eger; Attendance: 2,200; Referees: dr. Molnár, Molnár

- 5th leg

28 May; 18:00	Report	Szolnoki Dózsa-KÖZGÉP	10–8	ZF-Eger	Tiszaligeti uszoda, Szolnok; Attendance: 1,100; Referees: Székely, Németh
28 May; 18:00	Report	Score by quarters: 4–1, 0–1, 4–3, 2–3			Tiszaligeti uszoda, Szolnok; Attendance: 1,100; Referees: Székely, Németh
28 May; 18:00	Report	Madaras 4	Goals	Zalánki, Hosnyánszky 2	Tiszaligeti uszoda, Szolnok; Attendance: 1,100; Referees: Székely, Németh

Szolnoki Dózsa-KÖZGÉP won the FINAL series 3–2.

2015–16 Országos Bajnokság I
Champion

8th title

=== Third place ===
3rd placed team hosted Games 1, plus Game 3 if necessary. 4th placed team hosted Game 2.

3rd placed team	Agg.	4th placed team	Game 1	Game 2	Game 3
A-HÍD OSC Újbuda	2–0	FTC-PQS Waterpolo	10–7	10–9	

=== 5th place ===
5th placed team hosted Games 1, plus Game 3 if necessary. 6th placed team hosted Game 2.

5th placed team	Agg.	6th placed team	Game 1	Game 2	Game 3
ContiTech-Szeged Diapolo	0–2	BVSC-Wáberer Hungária-Zugló	4–6	8–9	

=== 7th place ===
7th placed team hosted Games 1, plus Game 3 if necessary. 8th placed team hosted Game 2.

7th placed team	Agg.	8th placed team	Game 1	Game 2	Game 3
RacioNet Honvéd	0–2	VasasPlaket	7–8	10–11	

=== 9th place ===
9th placed team hosted Games 1, plus Game 3 if necessary. 10th placed team hosted Game 2.

9th placed team	Agg.	10th placed team	Game 1	Game 2	Game 3
Debrecen	2–0	PannErgy-MVLC	11–7	8–6	

=== 11th place ===
11th placed team hosted Games 1, plus Game 3 if necessary. 12th placed team hosted Game 2.

11th placed team	Agg.	12th placed team	Game 1	Game 2	Game 3
Valdor Szentes	0–2	Kaposvári Vizilabda Klub	9–16	5–12	

=== 13th place ===
13th placed team hosted Games 1, plus Game 3 if necessary. 14th placed team hosted Game 2.

13th placed team	Agg.	14th placed team	Game 1	Game 2	Game 3
PVSK-Mecsek Füszért	1–2	UVSE-Hunguest Hotels	5–10	9–8	11–13

=== 15th place ===
15th placed team hosted Games 1, plus Game 3 if necessary. 16th placed team hosted Game 2.

15th placed team	Agg.	16th placed team	Game 1	Game 2	Game 3
EBP Tatabánya	2–1	KSI SE	14–15 (p)	11–10 (p)	16–8

== Season statistics ==
=== Top goalscorers ===
As of matches played on 29 May 2016.

Rank	Player	Team	Goals
1	(Hungary) Bence Bátori	OSC	61
1	(Hungary) Dániel Francsics	Tatabánya	61
3	(Hungary) Dénes Varga	Szolnok	57
4	(Serbia) Ivan Basara	PVSK	53
5	(Serbia) Stefan Mitrović	Szolnok	51
6	(Hungary) Márton Szívós	Eger	49
7	(Hungary) József Berta	Kaposvár	48
8	(Serbia) Marko Ćuk	FTC	48
8	(Hungary) Márk Kállay	DVSE	48
10	(Hungary) Krisztián Manhercz	Szeged	46

=== Top assists ===
Updated to games played on 29 May 2015.

Rank	Player	Team	Assists
1	(Hungary) Bálint Takács	Vasas	50
2	(Hungary) Dániel Angyal	Eger	45
2	(Hungary) Dávid Jansik	Szolnok	45
4	(Hungary) Máté Mocsári	Tatabánya	44
5	(Hungary) Bendegúz Szabó	BVSC	43
5	(Hungary) Béla Török	BVSC	43
7	(Hungary) Máté László Tóth	MVLC	42
8	(Hungary) Dénes Dorián Lukács	Szentes	41
8	(Hungary) Adrián Simon	Honvéd	41
10	(Hungary) Dávid Hőna	Vasas	40

=== MVP ===
Updated to games played on 29 May 2015.

Rank	Player	Team	Rating
1	(Hungary) Bence Bátori	OSC	55.9
2	(Hungary) Gábor Kis	Szolnok	55.7
3	(Hungary) Márton Szívós	Eger	55.5
4	(Hungary) Viktor Vörös	Szentes	55.1
5	(Serbia) Miloš Miličić	MVLC	53.7
6	(Serbia) Stefan Mitrović	Szolnok	52.3
7	(Hungary) Balázs Hárai	Eger	51.7
8	(Hungary) Dénes Varga	Szolnok	51.1
9	(Hungary) Gergő Kovács	Honvéd	48.3
8	(Hungary) dr. Ádám Steinmetz	Vasas	48.2

=== Number of teams by counties ===
Pos.	County (megye)	No. of teams	Teams
1	Budapest	7	BVSC, FTC, Honvéd, KSI, OSC, UVSE and Vasas
2	Csongrád	2	Szegedi VE and Szentesi VK
3	Baranya	1	PVSK
3	Borsod-Abaúj-Zemplén	1	MVLC
3	Hajdú-Bihar	1	DVSE
3	Heves	1	Egri VK
3	Jász-Nagykun-Szolnok	1	Szolnoki Dózsa
3	Komárom-Esztergom	1	Tatabányai VSE
3	Somogy	1	Kaposvári VK

== Hungarian clubs in European competitions ==
LEN Champions League

- Szolnoki Dózsa-KÖZGÉP

Round		Club	Home	Away	Aggregate
Qualification 2		(Serbia) VK Radnički	21-2		1st
Qualification 2		(Germany) Waspo Hannover	11-10		1st
Qualification 2		(Montenegro) Budva	19-5		1st
Qualification 3		(France) CN Marseille	13-6	7-6	20–12
Preliminary (Group B)		(Italy) Pro Recco	12-11	11-14	2nd
Preliminary (Group B)		(Serbia) Partizan	12-9	14-9	2nd
Preliminary (Group B)		(Croatia) Jug Dubrovnik	13-10	9-10	2nd
Preliminary (Group B)		(Turkey) Galatasaray	16-7	14-7	2nd
Preliminary (Group B)		(Hungary) OSC Budapest	8-7	12-6	2nd
F6	Quarter-final	(Spain) CNA Barceloneta	7–5		
F6	Semi-final	(Greece) Olympiacos	7–8		
F6	Bronze medal match	(Italy) Pro Recco	11–7		

- A-HÍD OSC Újbuda

Round	Club	Home	Away	Aggregate
Qualification 1	(France) CN Marseille	10-10		2nd
Qualification 1	(Germany) Waspo Hannover	7-7		2nd
Qualification 1	(Georgia (country)) Lokomotiv Tbilisi	15-3		2nd
Qualification 2	(Italy) AN Brescia	8-8		1st
Qualification 2	(Greece) NC Vouliagmeni	10-6		1st
Qualification 2	(France) Montpellier	11-3		1st
Qualification 3	(Romania) Digi Oradea	10-3	9-7	19–10
Preleminary (Group B)	(Italy) Pro Recco	7-12	2-7	4th
Preleminary (Group B)	(Serbia) Partizan	10-8	4-5	4th
Preleminary (Group B)	(Croatia) Jug Dubrovnik	7-9	7-10	4th
Preleminary (Group B)	(Turkey) Galatasaray	13-4	12-9	4th
Preleminary (Group B)	(Hungary) Szolnoki VSK	6-12	7-8	4th

- ZF-Eger

Round		Club	Home	Away	Aggregate
Preleminary (Group A)		(Spain) CNA Barceloneta	6-5	6-6	2nd
Preleminary (Group A)		(Greece) Olympiacos	8-8	7-8	2nd
Preleminary (Group A)		(Germany) Spandau 04	10-7	15-8	2nd
Preleminary (Group A)		(Croatia) Primorje	12-12	7-8	2nd
Preleminary (Group A)		(Montenegro) Jadran Herceg Novi	8-7	11-11	2nd
F6	Quarter-final	(Croatia) Jug Dubrovnik	6–8		
F6	5th-6th place	(Spain) CNA Barceloneta	6–10		

LEN Euro Cup

- FTC-PQS Waterpolo

Round	Club	Home	Away	Aggregate
Qualification 1	(Italy) Acquachiara	9-9		1st
Qualification 1	(Montenegro) Primorac Kotor	17-4		1st
Qualification 1	(Germany) SSV Esslingen	22-10		1st
Qualification 1	(Hungary) Szeged	11-10		1st
Qualification 1	(Croatia) Jadran Split	11-8		1st
Qualification 1	(France) SNS Strasbourg	14-12		1st
Qualification 2	(Russia) Kinef Kirishi	6-8		3rd
Qualification 2	(Italy) Acquachiara	7-6		3rd
Qualification 2	(Russia) Montpellier	8-8		3rd

- ContiTech-Szeged Diapolo

Round	Club	Home	Away	Aggregate
Qualification 1	(Hungary) Ferencváros	10-11		2nd
Qualification 1	(Italy) Acquachiara	10-5		2nd
Qualification 1	(Montenegro) Primorac Kotor	14-3		2nd
Qualification 1	(Germany) SSV Esslingen	23-11		2nd
Qualification 1	(Croatia) Jadran Split	14-9		2nd
Qualification 1	(France) SNS Strasbourg	13-10		2nd
Qualification 2	(Croatia) Mornar	11-12		2nd
Qualification 2	(Italy) Canottieri Napoli	18-12		2nd
Qualification 2	(Croatia) Jadran Split	14-9		2nd
Quarter-final	(Germany) Waspo Hannover	9-3	8-13	17–16
Semi-final	(Italy) AN Brescia	10-15	8-9	18–24

== Final standing ==
Qualified for the 2016-17 LEN Champions League
Qualified for the 2016-17 LEN Euro Cup

Rank	Team
1st place, gold medalist(s)	Szolnoki Dózsa-KÖZGÉP
2nd place, silver medalist(s)	ZF-Eger
3rd place, bronze medalist(s)	A-HÍD OSC Újbuda
4	FTC-PQS Waterpolo
5	BVSC-Wáberer Hungária-Zugló
6	ContiTech-Szeged Diapolo
7	VasasPlaket
8	RacioNet Honvéd
9	Debrecen
10	PannErgy-MVLC
11	Kaposvári Vizilabda Klub
12	Valdor Szentes
13	UVSE-Hunguest Hotels
14	PVSK-Mecsek Füszért
15	EBP Tatabánya
16	KSI SE

=== Awards ===
- MVP: (Hungary) Dénes Varga (Szolnoki Dózsa-KÖZGÉP)
- Best Goalkeeper: (Hungary) Viktor Nagy (Szolnoki Dózsa-KÖZGÉP)

== See also ==
- 2015 Magyar Kupa
