= 2019–20 Serie A1 (men's water polo) =

Water polo league season

Serie A1
- Season: 2019–20
- Champions: not assigned due to the COVID-19 pandemic.

The 2019–20 Serie A1 is the 101st season of the Serie A1, Italy's premier Water polo league.

== Team information ==
Location of teams in 2019–20 Serie A1

The following 14 clubs compete in the Serie A1 during the 2019–20 season:

Serie A1
Team	City	Pool	Founded	Colours
AN Brescia	Brescia	Centro natatorio Mompiano	1973	
Canottieri	Naples	Piscina Circolo Canottieri Napoli	1916	
Florentia	Florence	Piscina Goffredo Nannini	1904	
Lazio	Rome	Stadio Olimpico del Nuoto	1900	
Ortiglia	Syracuse	Piscina Paolo Caldarella	1928	
Posillipo	Naples	Piscina "Alba Oriens" (Casoria)	1925	
Pro Recco	Recco	Piscina Comunale (Sori)	1913	

== Regular season ==
	Team	Pld	W	D	L	GF	GA	Diff	Pts
1	Pro Recco	16	16	0	0	296	88	+208	48

Pld - Played; W - Won; D - Drawn; L - Lost; GF - Goals for; GA - Goals against; Diff - Difference; Pts - Points.
