= Marco Del Lungo =

Italian water polo player

Personal information
- Born: 1 March 1990 (age 36) Tarquinia, Italia
- Height: 1.90 m (6 ft 3 in)
- Weight: 97 kg (214 lb)

Sport
- Sport: Water polo
- Handedness: Right
- Position: Goalkeeper
- Current club: Pro Recco
- Number: 1

Senior clubs
- Years: Team
- 2005–2011: Civitavecchia
- 2011–2021: Brescia
- –: Pro Recco
Medal record
Representing Italy
Olympic Games
Bronze medal – third place	2016 Rio de Janeiro	team
World Championships
Gold medal – first place	2019 Gwangju	team
Silver medal – second place	2022 Budapest	Team
Silver medal – second place	2024 Doha	Team
European Championship
Bronze medal – third place	2014 Budapest
Bronze medal – third place	2024 Zagreb
World Cup
Bronze medal – third place	2026 Sydney
FINA World League
Silver medal – second place	2017 Ruza
World Cup
Silver medal – second place	2023 Los Angeles

Marco Del Lungo (born 1 March 1990) is an Italian professional water polo player. He was part of the Italian team at the 2016 Summer Olympics, where the team won the bronze medal.

== Honours ==
=== Club ===
Brescia

- LEN Euro Cup: 2015–16
- Serie A1: 2020–21
- Coppa Italia: 2011–12

Pro Recco

- LEN Champions League: 2021–22
- LEN Super Cup: 2021, 2022
- Serie A: 2021–22
- Coppa Italia: 2021–22

== Awards ==
- Member of the World Team by total-waterpolo: 2019
- LEN Champions League Goalkeeper of the Year: 2022–23

== See also ==
- Italy men's Olympic water polo team records and statistics
- List of Olympic medalists in water polo (men)
- List of men's Olympic water polo tournament goalkeepers
- List of world champions in men's water polo
- List of World Aquatics Championships medalists in water polo
