= Stefano Tempesti =

Italian water polo player

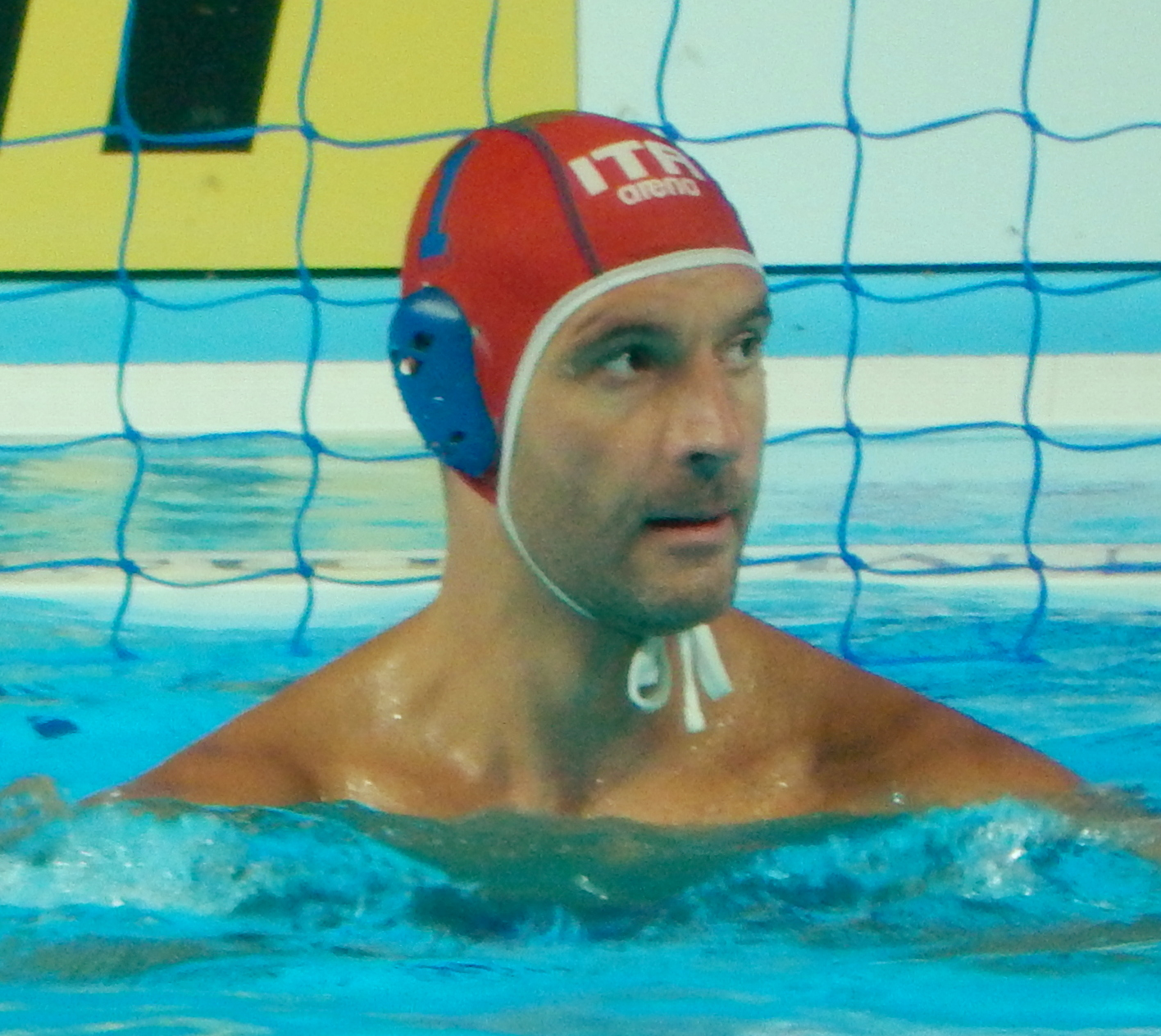
- Tempesti at the 2015 World Championships

Personal information
- Born: 9 July 1979 (age 46) Prato, Italy
- Height: 2.05 m (6 ft 9 in)
- Weight: 100 kg (220 lb)

Sport
- Country: Italy
- Sport: Water polo
- Club: RN Florentia (-2003); Pro Recco (2003-)
Medal record
Olympic Games
Silver medal – second place	2012 London	Team
Bronze medal – third place	2016 Rio de Janeiro	Team
World Championships
Gold medal – first place	2011 Shanghai	Team
Silver medal – second place	2003 Barcelona	Team
European Championships
Bronze medal – third place	2014 Budapest
World League
Silver medal – second place	2003 New York
Silver medal – second place	2011 Florence
World Cup
Silver medal – second place	1999 Sydney

Stefano Tempesti (born 9 June 1979) is an Italian water polo goalkeeper. He competed at five consecutive Olympics between 2000 and 2016 and won a silver medal in 2012 and a bronze in 2016. He is the second water polo goalkeeper to compete at five Olympics, after Spaniard Jesús Rollán. Tempesti was the top goalkeeper at the 2008 Olympics, with 83 saves. He was also the top goalkeeper at the 2012 Olympics, with 87 saves.

== Biography ==
Tempesti started his career in his hometown's Futura Prato, before moving to RN Florentia. He remained there until 2003, when he started playing for his current team, Pro Recco. With Florentia, he won the LEN Cup Winners' Cup in 2001, while with Pro Recco he won eleven consecutive national titles and five LEN Euroleagues (2007, 2008, 2010, 2012 and 2015). He debuted for the Italian national team in 1997 and won a gold medal at the 2011 World Championships, where he was chosen as the Best Goalkeeper of the tournament.

Tempesti has two children with his partner Elisabetta. He manages the women's water polo team Mediostar Prato.

== Honours ==
RN Florentia

LEN Euro Cup: 2000–01; runners-up: 2002–03

Pro Recco

- Serie A1: 2005–06, 2006–07, 2007–08, 2008–09, 2009–10, 2010–11, 2011–12, 2012–13, 2013–14, 2014–15, 2015–16, 2016–17, 2017–18, 2018–19
- Coppa Italia: 2005–06, 2006–07, 2007–08, 2008–09, 2009–10, 2010–11, 2012–13, 2013–14, 2014–15, 2015–16, 2016–17, 2017–18, 2018–19
- LEN Champions League: 2006–07, 2007–08, 2009–10, 2011–12, 2014–15
- LEN Super Cup: 2007, 2008, 2010, 2012, 2015
- Adriatic League: 2011–12

== Awards ==
- LEN "European Player of the Year" award: 2011
- Best Goalkeeper of 2009 World Championship
- Best Goalkeeper of 2011 World Championship
- Best Goalkeeper of 2012 World League
- Member of the Second Best Team of the Decade in the World 2010–20 by total-waterpolo

== See also ==
- Italy men's Olympic water polo team records and statistics
- List of athletes with the most appearances at Olympic Games
- List of players who have appeared in multiple men's Olympic water polo tournaments
- List of Olympic medalists in water polo (men)
- List of men's Olympic water polo tournament goalkeepers
- List of world champions in men's water polo
- List of World Aquatics Championships medalists in water polo
