= Tamás Märcz =

Hungarian water polo player

Personal information
- Nationality: Hungarian, Italian
- Born: 17 July 1974 (age 52) Budapest, Hungary
- Height: 1.86 m (6 ft 1 in)

Sport
- Sport: Water polo
- Handedness: Right
- Position: Driver
- Current club: Hungary (head coach)

Youth career
- Years: Team
- –: KSI

Senior clubs
- Years: Team
- –1993: KSI
- 1993–2000: BVSC-Brendon
- 2000–2005: Savona
- 2005–2006: Chiavari
- 2006–2007: Brendon-Fenstherm-ZF-Eger
- 2007–2008: Nervi
- 2008–2009: Pro Recco
- 2009: → Sirens (Summer League)
- 2009–2012: Acquachiara
National team
- Years: Team
- 1995–2001: Hungary
- 2012: Italy

Teams coached
- 2013–2017: MKB-Euroleasing-BVSC-Zugló
- 2014–2015: Hungary women's (assistant)
- 2017–2022: Hungary
Medal record
Men's water polo
Representing Hungary
Olympic Games
Gold medal – first place	2000 Sydney	Team competition
FINA World Cup
Gold medal – first place	1999 Sydney	Team competition
Representing Hungary (as head coach)
Bronze medal – third place	2020 Tokyo	Team competition
Silver medal – second place	2017 Budapest	Team competition
Gold medal – first place	2018 Berlin
Silver medal – second place	2018 Budapest
Gold medal – first place	2020 Budapest
Gold medal – first place	2019 Zagreb

Tamás Märcz (born 17 July 1974) is a Hungarian water polo player who played on the gold medal squad at the 2000 Summer Olympics. He was the head coach of Hungary men's national water polo team between 1 January 2017 and 18 July 2022.

He has played in the Italian Water polo Serie A and has played in Malta with Sirens, winning a knockout title.

== Honours ==
=== National ===
- Olympic Games: Gold medal – 2000
- World Championships: Silver medal – 1998
- European Championship: Gold medal – 1997, 1999; Silver medal – 1995; Bronze medal – 2001
- FINA World Cup: Gold medal – 1999
- Junior World Championships: (Bronze medal – 1993)
- Junior European Championship: (Gold medal – 1992)

=== Club ===
European competitions:

- LEN Cup Winner (1): (2005 – with Savona)
- LEN Super Cup Winner (1): (2008 – with Pro Recco)

Domestic competitions:

- Hungarian Championship (OB I): 4x (1996, 1997, 1998, 1999 – with BVSC)
- Hungarian Cup (Magyar Kupa): 2x (1995, 2000 – with BVSC)
- Italian Championship (Serie A1): 2x (2005 – with Savona; 2009 – with Pro Recco)
- Italian Cup: 1x (2009 – with Pro Recco)

== Awards ==
- Member of the Hungarian team of the year: 1997, 1999, 2000
- Széchenyi-medallion (2000)
- Csanádi-díj: 2001

Orders

- Officer's Cross of the Order of Merit of the Republic of Hungary (2000)

== See also ==
- Hungary men's Olympic water polo team records and statistics
- List of Olympic champions in men's water polo
- List of Olympic medalists in water polo (men)
- List of World Aquatics Championships medalists in water polo
