= 2009–10 Serie A1 (men's water polo) =

Italy's premier water polo league

Serie A1
- Season: 2009–10
- Champions: Pro Recco; 24th title
- Top goalscorer: Mlađan Janović (74 goals)

The 2009–10 Serie A1 is the 91st season of the Serie A1, Italy's premier Water polo league. Pro Recco were the champions.
