= RN Camogli =

- Founded: 1914
- League: Serie A1
- Based in: Camogli, Italy
- Colors
- Website: http://www.rncamogli.it

Rari Nantes Camogli is an Italian water polo club based in Camogli, Liguria.

== History ==
The club was founded in 1914 by Enrico Corzetto and Tiziano De Nardi.

== Titles ==
- Italian League
  - 1935, 1946, 1952, 1953, 1955, 1957

== Current team ==
- (Italy) Lorenzo Gardella
- (Italy) Jacopo Celli
- (Italy) Matteo Antonucci
- (Italy) Jacopo Guenna
- (Italy) Matteo Pino
- (Italy) Nicolo' Gatti
