= 2011–12 Serie A1 (men's water polo) =

Italy's premier water polo league

Serie A1
- Season: 2011–12
- Champions: Pro Recco; 26th title
- Highest scoring: Christian Presciutti (80 goals)

The 2011–12 Serie A1 is the 93rd season of the Serie A1, Italy's premier Water polo league. Pro Recco were the champions.
