= 2017–18 Serie A1 (men's water polo) =

Italian water polo league season

Serie A1
- Season: 2017–18
- Champions: Pro Recco; 32nd

The 2017–18 Serie A1 is the 99th season of the Serie A1, Italy's premier water polo league.

== Team information ==
Location of teams in 2017–18 Serie A1

The following 14 clubs compete in the Serie A1 during the 2017–18 season:

Serie A1
Team	City	Pool	Founded	Colours
Acquachiara	Naples	Piscina Felipe Scandone	1998	
Bogliasco	Bogliasco	Stadio del nuoto Gianni Vassallo	1951	
Pro Recco	Recco	Piscina comunale di Sori	1913	
