= Serie B (men's water polo) =

Third division of the Italian men's water polo championship

- Country: Italy
- Confederation: (European Union) LEN (Europe)
- Number of clubs: 40
- Promotion to: Serie A2
- Relegation to: Serie C
- Domestic cup: Coppa Italia
- Broadcaster: Rai 2
- Website: federnuoto.it
- Current: 2023–24 Serie B

The Serie B di pallanuoto maschile is the third division of the Italian water polo male national championship.

40 teams participate in the tournament, which are divided into four groups consisting of ten teams. At the end of the regular season the top two teams of each group participate in the play-off phase, from which four winners emerge that achieve promotion to Serie A2. The teams ranked in tenth place of each group are directly relegated and are joined by the teams defeated in the play-outs. The play-outs consist of the eighth and ninth placed teams. This results in a total of eight relegations to Serie C.
