= 2010–11 Serie A1 (men's water polo) =

Italy's premier water polo league

Serie A1
- Season: 2010–11
- Champions: Pro Recco; 25th title
- Top goalscorer: Aleksandar Ivovic (79 goals)

The 2010–11 Serie A1 is the 92nd season of the Serie A1, Italy's premier Water polo league. Pro Recco were the champions.
