= 2008–09 Serie A1 (men's water polo) =

Italy's premier water polo league

Serie A1
- Season: 2008–09
- Champions: Pro Recco; 23rd title
- Top goalscorer: Heiko Nossek (81 goals)

The 2008–09 Serie A1 was the 90th season of the Serie A1, Italy's premier Water polo league. Pro Recco were champions.
