= Serie A2 (men's water polo) =

Italian water polo league

- Founded: 1984
- Country: Italy
- Confederation: LEN (Europe)
- Number of clubs: 24
- Promotion to: Serie A1
- Relegation to: Serie B
- Domestic cup(s): Coppa Italia
- TV partners: Rai 2
- Website: federnuoto.it
- Current: 2023–24 Serie A2

The Serie A2 di pallanuoto maschile is the second division of the Italian men's water polo national championship.

The tournament has 24 teams, which are divided into two groups of twelve teams each, based on geographical location.

The first phase of the regular season has two groups of eight teams each: the North group and the South group. The top four teams of each group participate in a play-off. Semi-finals and finals are a best of three games. The winners of the two groups gain promotion to Serie A1.

There are four relegations to Serie B in total. The tenth-placed team faces the eleventh-placed team from the opposing group, always in a best of three games.

In play-off the teams intersect in two brackets according to the following schedule:

Table 1
1º Northern group - 4º Southern group
2º Southern group - 3º Northern group
Table 2
1º Southern group - 4º Northern group
2º Northern group - 3º Southern group
