= 2012–13 Serie A1 (men's water polo) =

Italy's premier water polo league

Serie A1
- Season: 2012–13
- Champions: Pro Recco; 27th title
- Top goalscorer: Valerio Rizzo (92 goals)

The 2012–13 Serie A1 is the 94th season of the Serie A1, Italy's premier Water polo league. Pro Recco were the champions.
