= 2014–15 LEN Euro Cup =

- League: LEN Euro Cup
- Sport: Water Polo
- Duration: 30 October 2014 to 11 April 2015
- Teams: 24
- Finals champions: (Italy) Posillipo (1st title)
- Runners-up: (Italy) Acquachiara

Euro Cup seasons
- ← 2013–14 2015–16 →

The 2014–15 LEN Euro Cup was the second tier of European competition in water polo. It ran from 30 October 2014 to 11 April 2015, and it was contested by twenty-one teams from twelve countries.

== Overview ==
=== Team allocation ===
- CL: Transferred from the Champions League
  - Q2: Third and fourth-placed teams from the QR2
  - Q1: Sixth-placed teams from the QR1

Qualification round II
(Croatia) Mornar	(Italy) Savona	(Russia) Dinamo Astrachan	(Germany) Waspo Hannover (CL Q2)
(France) Sète	(Italy) Acquachiara	(Russia) Kinef Kirishi	(Georgia (country)) Ligamus Tbilisi (CL Q1)
(France) Olympic Nice	(Malta) Valletta	(Serbia) Vojvodina	(France) Montpellier (CL Q1)
(Germany) Esslingen	(Montenegro) Primorac Kotor	(Russia) Sintez Kazan (CL Q2)	
(Germany) White Sharks	(Netherlands) Utrecht	(Montenegro) Jadran Herceg Novi (CL Q2)	
(Greece) Vouliagmeni	(Romania) Steaua București	(Italy) Posillipo (CL Q2)	

== Round and draw dates ==
The schedule of the competition is as follows.

Phase	Round	First leg	Second leg
Qualifying	Qualification round I	10–12 October 2014	
Qualifying	Qualification round II	30 October–2 November 2014	
Knockout stage	Quarter-finals	29 November 2014	17 December 2014
Knockout stage	Semi-finals	11 February 2015	4 March 2015
Knockout stage	Final	28 March 2015	11 April 2015

== Qualifying rounds ==
=== Qualification round I ===
- 10–12 October

=== Qualification round II ===
- 30 October-2 November

Twelve teams will take part in the quarter-finals. They will be drawn into five groups of five or six teams, whose played on 30 October–2 November 2014. Group winners and runners-up teams of each group advance to quarter finals.

Key to colors in group tables
Group winners and runners-up advance to quarter finals

==== Group A ====
Vouliagmeni has the right to organize the tournament.

Team	Pld	W	D	L	GF	GA	GD	Pts
(Russia) Sintez Kazan	5	4	0	1	67	45	+22	12
(Italy) Acquachiara	5	3	1	1	74	47	+27	10
(Greece) Vouliagmeni	5	3	1	1	52	38	+14	10
(Montenegro) Jadran Herceg Novi	5	2	2	1	58	38	+20	8
(Netherlands) Utrecht	5	1	0	4	37	62	−25	3
(Germany) Esslingen	5	0	0	5	36	94	−58	0

==== Group B ====
Valletta has the right to organize the tournament.

Team	Pld	W	D	L	GF	GA	GD	Pts
(Croatia) Mornar	4	4	0	0	64	27	+37	12
(Romania) Steaua București	4	3	0	1	44	30	+14	9
(France) Montpellier	4	2	0	2	46	30	+16	6
(Montenegro) Primorac Kotor	4	1	0	3	30	47	−17	3
(Malta) Valletta	4	0	0	4	24	74	−50	0

==== Group C ====
Olympic Nice has the right to organize the tournament.

Team	Pld	W	D	L	GF	GA	GD	Pts
(France) Olympic Nice	4	3	1	0	46	27	+19	10
(Italy) Posillipo	4	3	1	0	48	34	+14	10
(Russia) Kinef Kirishi	4	2	0	2	48	33	+15	6
(France) Sète	4	0	1	3	32	52	−20	1
(Germany) White Sharks	4	0	1	3	33	61	−28	1

==== Group D ====
Savona has the right to organize the tournament.

Team	Pld	W	D	L	GF	GA	GD	Pts
(Germany) Waspo Hannover	4	3	1	0	47	24	+23	10
(Italy) Savona	4	3	1	0	42	31	+11	10
(Russia) Dinamo Astrachan	4	1	1	2	32	34	−2	4
(Serbia) Vojvodina	4	1	1	2	22	35	−13	4
(Georgia (country)) Ligamus Tbilisi	4	0	0	4	30	49	−19	0

== Knockout stage ==
=== Bracket ===
Quarter-finals
(Romania) Steaua București	9	9	18
(Germany) Waspo Hannover	7	9	16
(Russia) Sintez Kazan	9	7	16
(Italy) Posillipo	6	12	18
(Italy) Acquachiara	13	10	23
(France) Olympic Nice	7	10	17
(Croatia) Mornar	10	4	14
(Italy) Savona	5	8	13

Semi-finals
(Romania) Steaua București	6	5	11
(Italy) Posillipo	8	8	16
(Italy) Acquachiara	15	7	22
(Croatia) Mornar	11	7	18

Final
(Italy) Posillipo	6	11	17
(Italy) Acquachiara	6	10	16

=== Quarter-finals ===
- 29 November 2014 1st match
- 17 December 2014 2nd match

Key to colors
Seeded in quarter finals draw
Unseeded in quarter finals draw

Group	Winners	Runners-up
A	(Russia) Sintez Kazan	(Italy) Acquachiara
B	(Croatia) Mornar	(Romania) Steaua București
C	(France) Olympic Nice	(Italy) Posillipo
D	(Germany) Waspo Hannover	(Italy) Savona

These teams played against each other over two legs on a home-and-away basis. The mechanism of the draws for each round was as follow:

- In the draw for the quarter-finals, the four group winners were seeded, and the four group runners-up were unseeded. The seeded teams were drawn against the unseeded teams, with the seeded teams hosting the second leg. Teams from the same group or the same association could not be drawn against each other.

The first legs were played on 29 November, and the second legs were played on 17 December 2014.

Team 1	Agg.	Team 2	1st leg	2nd leg
Sintez Kazan (Russia)	16–18	(Italy) Posillipo	9–6	7–12
Mornar (Croatia)	14–13	(Italy) Savona	10–5	4–8
Steaua București (Romania)	18–16	(Germany) Waspo Hannover	9–7	9–9
Acquachiara (Italy)	23–17	(France) Olympic Nice	13–7	10–10

=== Semi-finals ===
The draw was held on 10 January 2015 in Belgrade, Serbia. The first legs were played on 11 February, and the second legs were played on 4 March 2015.

Team 1	Agg.	Team 2	1st leg	2nd leg
Steaua București (Romania)	11–16	(Italy) Posillipo	6–8	5–8
Acquachiara (Italy)	22–18	(Croatia) Mornar	15–11	7–7

=== Finals ===
The first leg were played on 28 March, and the second leg were played on 11 April 2015.

Team 1	Agg.	Team 2	1st leg	2nd leg
Posillipo (Italy)	17–16	(Italy) Acquachiara	6–6	11–10

2015–16 LEN Euro Cup
Champions

Posillipo
1st Cup

== See also ==
- 2014–15 LEN Champions League
