= Serie A1 (water polo) =

Water polo league

- Current season, competition or edition: 2026–27 Serie A1 (men's water polo)
- Sport: Water polo
- Founded: 1912; 114 years ago
- Administrator: Italian Swimming Federation (FIN)
- No. of teams: 14
- Country: Italy
- Confederation: LEN (Europe)
- Most recent champion: Pro Recco (38th title) (2025–26)
- Most titles: Pro Recco (38 titles)
- Broadcaster: Rai Sport
- Relegation to: Serie A2
- Domestic cup: Coppa Italia
- International cups: LEN Champions League; LEN Euro Cup
- Website: federnuoto.it

The Serie A1 di pallanuoto maschile is the premier division of the Italian water polo male national championship. First held in 1912, it is currently contested by fourteen teams. Pro Recco is Serie A1's most successful club with 38 titles since 1959, followed by CN Posillipo with eleven.

== Current teams ==
The following 14 clubs compete in the Serie A1 during the 2022–23 season:

Team	Home city	Pool	Colours
AN Brescia	Brescia	Centro Natatorio Mompiano	
Anzio	Anzio	Stadio del nuoto di Anzio	
Bogliasco	Bogliasco	Stadio Gianni Vassallo	
Catania	Catania	Piscina Francesco Scuderi	
De Akker	Bologna	Piscina Carmen Longo	
Ortigia	Syracuse	Piscina Paolo Caldarella	
Posillipo	Naples	Piscina Felice Scandone	
Pro Recco	Recco	Piscina Punta Sant'Anna	
Quinto	Genoa	Stadio del Nuoto di Albaro	
Roma	Rome	Piscina dei "Mosaici"	
Salerno	Salerno	Piscina Simone Vitale	
Savona	Savona	Piscina Carlo Zanelli	
Telimar	Palermo	Piscina olimpionica comunale	
Trieste	Trieste	Polo Natatorio "Bruno Bianchi"	

Location of teams in 2022–23 Serie A1

== Previous winners ==
- 1912: Genoa
- 1913: Genoa (2)
- 1914: Genoa (3)
- 1915-18 – Not held due to World War I
- 1919: Genoa (4)
- 1920: Rari Nantes Milano
- 1921: Andrea Doria
- 1922: Andrea Doria (2)
- 1923: Sportiva Sturla
- 1924 – Not played
- 1925: Andrea Doria (3)
- 1926: Andrea Doria (4)
- 1927: Andrea Doria (5)
- 1928: Andrea Doria (6)
- 1929: Triestina
- 1930: Andrea Doria (7)
- 1931: Andrea Doria (8)
- 1932: Rari Nantes Milano (2)
- 1933: Rari Nantes Florentia
- 1934: Rari Nantes Florentia (2)
- 1935: Rari Nantes Camogli
- 1936: Rari Nantes Florentia (3)
- 1937: Rari Nantes Florentia (4)
- 1938: Rari Nantes Florentia (5)
- 1939: Napoli
- 1940: Rari Nantes Florentia (6)
- 1941: Napoli (2)
- 1942: Napoli (3)
- 1943-45 – Not held due to World War II
- 1946: Rari Nantes Camogli (2)
- 1947: Canottieri Olona
- 1948: Rari Nantes Florentia (7)
- 1949: Napoli (4)
- 1950: Napoli (5)
- 1951: Canottieri Napoli
- 1952: Rari Nantes Camogli (3)
- 1953: Rari Nantes Camogli (4)
- 1954: Roma
- 1955: Rari Nantes Camogli (5)
- 1956: Lazio
- 1957: Rari Nantes Camogli (6)
- 1958: Canottieri Napoli (2)
- 1959: Pro Recco
- 1960: Pro Recco (2)
- 1961: Pro Recco (3)
- 1962: Pro Recco (4)
- 1963: Canottieri Napoli (3)
- 1964: Pro Recco (5)
- 1965: Pro Recco (6)
- 1966: Pro Recco (7)
- 1967: Pro Recco (8)
- 1968: Pro Recco (9)
- 1969: Pro Recco (10)
- 1970: Pro Recco (11)
- 1971: Pro Recco (12)
- 1972: Pro Recco (13)
- 1973: Canottieri Napoli (4)
- 1974: Pro Recco (14)
- 1975: Canottieri Napoli (5)
- 1976: Florentia (8)
- 1977: Canottieri Napoli (6)
- 1978: Pro Recco (15)
- 1979: Canottieri Napoli (7)
- 1980: Florentia (9)
- 1981: Bogliasco
- 1982: Pro Recco (16)
- 1983: Pro Recco (17)
- 1983–84: Pro Recco (18)
- 1984–85: Circolo Nautico Posillipo
- 1985–86: Circolo Nautico Posillipo (2)
- 1986–87: Pescara
- 1987–88: Circolo Nautico Posillipo (3)
- 1988–89: Circolo Nautico Posillipo (4)
- 1989–90: Canottieri Napoli (8)
- 1990–91: Savona
- 1991–92: Savona (2)
- 1992–93: Circolo Nautico Posillipo (5)
- 1993–94: Circolo Nautico Posillipo (6)
- 1994–95: Circolo Nautico Posillipo (7)
- 1995–96: Circolo Nautico Posillipo (8)
- 1996–97: Pescara (2)
- 1997–98: Pescara (3)
- 1998–99: Roma (2)
- 1990–00: Circolo Nautico Posillipo (9)
- 2000–01: Circolo Nautico Posillipo (10)
- 2001–02: Pro Recco (19)
- 2002–03: Leonessa
- 2003–04: Circolo Nautico Posillipo (11)
- 2004–05: Savona (3)
- 2005–06: Pro Recco (20)
- 2006–07: Pro Recco (21)
- 2007–08: Pro Recco (22)
- 2008–09: Pro Recco (23)
- 2009–10: Pro Recco (24)
- 2010–11: Pro Recco (25)
- 2011–12: Pro Recco (26)
- 2012–13: Pro Recco (27)
- 2013–14: Pro Recco (28)
- 2014–15: Pro Recco (29)
- 2015–16: Pro Recco (30)
- 2016–17: Pro Recco (31)
- 2017–18: Pro Recco (32)
- 2018–19: Pro Recco (33)
- 2019–20 – not assigned due to the COVID-19 pandemic.
- 2020–21: AN Brescia (2)
- 2021–22: Pro Recco (34)
- 2022–23: Pro Recco (35)
- 2023–24: Pro Recco (36)
- 2024–25: Pro Recco (37)
- 2025–26: Pro Recco (38)

=== Notes ===
- 1915–18: Cancelled due to war.
- 1924: Not played.
- 1943–45: Cancelled due to war.
- 2019–20: Suspended and then permanently interrupted for the COVID-19 pandemic.

== Performances ==
=== Performance by club ===
The teams in Bold play in the 2023-24 season of Serie A1.
The teams in Italics no longer exist.

Club	Winners	Runners-up	Third place	Winning years
**Pro Recco**	**38**			1959, 1960, 1961, 1962, 1964, 1965, 1966, 1967, 1968, 1969, 1970, 1971, 1972, 1974, 1978, 1982, 1983, 1984, 2002, 2006, 2007, 2008, 2009, 2010, 2011, 2012, 2013, 2014, 2015, 2016, 2017, 2018, 2019, 2022, 2023, 2024, 2025, 2026
**Circolo Nautico Posillipo**	**11**			1985, 1986, 1988, 1989, 1993, 1994, 1995, 1996, 2000, 2001, 2004
Rari Nantes Florentia	**9**	8	2	1933, 1934, 1936, 1937, 1938, 1940, 1948, 1976, 1980
Andrea Doria	**8**			1921, 1922, 1925, 1926, 1927, 1928, 1930, 1931
Canottieri Napoli	**8**	3	5	1951, 1958, 1963, 1973, 1975, 1977, 1979, 1990
**Rari Nantes Camogli**	**6**	4	3	1935, 1946, 1952, 1953, 1955, 1957
Napoli	**5**	11	4	1939, 1941, 1942, 1949, 1950
Genoa	**4**			1912, 1913, 1914, 1919
Pescara	**3**			1986–87, 1996–97, 1997–98
**Savona**	**3**			1990–91, 1991–92, 2004–05
Milano	**2**	1		1920, 1932
Roma	**2**			1954, 1998–99
**Brescia**	**2**	1		2002–03, 2020–21
Sportiva Sturla	**1**	1		1923
Triestina	**1**	1	3	1929
Canottieri Olona	**1**	1	1	1947
Lazio	**1**	3	8	1956
Bogliasco	**1**			1981
Sportiva Nervi	-	3	3	-
Mameli di Volturi	-	2	2	–
138th Legion	-	2	-	–
Cavagnaro	-	1	2	–
32nd Legion	-	1	-	–
SC Italia	-	-	1	–

=== Regions ===
The following table lists the Italian water polo champions by regions of Italy.

No.	Region (Regione)	Titles	Winning clubs
1.	Liguria	61	**Pro Recco** (38); Andrea Doria (8); **Camogli** (6); Genoa (4); **Savona** (3); Sturla (1); Bogliasco(1)
2.	Campania	24	**Posillipo** (11); Canottieri Napoli(8); Napoli (5)
3.	Tuscany	9	Florentia (9)
4.	Lombardy	5	Milano (2); Canottieri Olona (1); **Brescia** (2)
5.	Abruzzo	3	Pescara (3)
5.	Lazio	3	Roma (2); Lazio(1)
7.	Friuli-Venezia Giulia	1	Triestina (1)

- The bolded teams are currently playing in the 2023-2024 season of the Italian League.

== Italian clubs in European competitions ==
	European Aquatics Champions League				European Aquatics Euro Cup				LEN Cup Winners' Cup (defunct)			
	C		RU	SF	C		RU	SF	C		RU	SF
Pro Recco	11	1965, 1984, 2003, 2007, 2008, 2010, 2012, 2015, 2021, 2022, 2023	9	5	1	2025	2	0	0		0	
Posillipo	3	1997, 1998, 2005	0	6	1	2015	0	2	2	1987, 2003	1	
Canottieri Napoli	1	1978	1	2	0		0	0	0		0	
Pescara	1	1988	1	0	1	1996	1	0	3	1990, 1993, 1994	1	
Savona	0		1	1	3	2005, 2011, 2012	2	3	0		0	
AN Brescia	0		0	2	4	2002, 2003, 2006, 2006	1	1	0		0	
Roma Nuoto	0		0	0	1	1994	0	0	1	1996	1	
Florentia	0		0	0	0		2	1	1	2001	1	
Telimar Palermo	0		0	0	0		1	0	0		0	
Arenzano	–				–				1	1989	0	
Volturno	–				0		1	0	0		1	
Acquachiara	–				0		1	1	–			
Bissolati Cremona	–			0	0	1	–					
