= 2015–16 LEN Euro Cup =

2015−16 LEN Euro Cup
- League: LEN Euro Cup
- Sport: Water Polo
- Duration: 30 September 2015 to 30 April 2016
- Teams: 17
- Finals champions: (Italy) AN Brescia (4th title)
- Runners-up: (Russia) Sintez Kazan

Euro Cup seasons
- ← 2014–15 2016−17 →

The 2015–16 LEN Euro Cup was the second tier of European competition in water polo. It ran from 30 September 2015 to 30 April 2016.

== Overview ==
=== Team allocation ===
Qualification round I
(Croatia) Jadran Split	(Croatia) Mornar	(France) SNS Strasbourg	(France) Olympic Nice
(Hungary) Ferencváros	(Hungary) Szeged	(Italy) Acquachiara	(Italy) Canottieri Napoli
(Russia) Sintez Kazan	(Russia) Kinef Kirishi	(Germany) SSV Esslingen	(Montenegro) Primorac Kotor
(Netherlands) GZC Donk
Quarter-finals
(Germany) Waspo Hannover (CL Q3)	(Romania) Digi Oradea (CL Q3)	(France) CN Marseille (CL Q3)	(Italy) AN Brescia (CL Q3)

=== Round and draw dates ===
The schedule of the competition was as follows.

Phase	Round	First leg	Second leg
Qualifying	Qualification round I	30 September–4 October 2015	
Qualifying	Qualification round II	16−18 October 2015	
Knockout stage	Quarter-finals	11 November 2015	16 December 2015
Knockout stage	Semi-finals	3 February 2016	10 February 2016
Knockout stage	Final	16 April 2016	30 April 2016

== Qualifying rounds ==
=== Qualification round I ===
Thirteen teams took part in the first qualifying round. They were drawn into one group of six and one group of seven teams, who played on 30 September−4 October 2015. The top four teams of each group advanced to the next round.

Key to colours in group tables
Top four advance to next round

==== Group A ====
Tournament played in Budapest, Hungary.

Team	Pld	W	D	L	GF	GA	GD	Pts	FTC	SZE	ACH	JAD	STRA	ESS	PRI
(Hungary) Ferencváros	6	5	1	0	84	53	+31	16	—	11–10	9–9	11–8	14–12	22–10	17–4
(Hungary) Szeged	6	5	0	1	84	49	+35	15	10–11	—	10–5	14–9	13–10	23–11	14–3
(Italy) Acquachiara	6	4	1	1	65	44	+21	13	9–9	5–10	—	11–4	10–8	15–7	15–6
(Croatia) Jadran Split	6	3	0	3	58	60	−2	9	8–11	9–14	4–11	—	13–9	15–9	9–6
(France) SNS Strasbourg	6	2	0	4	67	66	+1	6	12–14	10–13	8–10	9–13	—	14–6	14–10
(Germany) SSV Esslingen	6	1	0	5	56	98	−42	3	10–22	11–23	7–15	9–15	6–14	—	13–9
(Montenegro) Primorac Kotor	6	0	0	6	38	82	−44	0	4–17	3–14	6–15	6–9	10–14	9–13	—

==== Group B ====
Tournament played in Split, Croatia.

Team	Pld	W	D	L	GF	GA	GD	Pts	MOR	SIN	CCN	KIN	OLN	GZC
(Croatia) Mornar	5	4	0	1	68	49	+19	12	—	11–9	15–8	10–15	10–7	22–10
(Russia) Sintez Kazan	5	4	0	1	60	35	+25	12	9–11	—	13–9	10–9	10–5	18–1
(Italy) Canottieri Napoli	5	3	0	2	55	49	+6	9	8–15	9–13	—	10–8	12–5	16–8
(Russia) Kinef Kirishi	5	3	0	2	62	47	+15	9	15–10	9–10	8–10	—	14–9	16–8
(France) Olympic Nice	5	1	0	4	38	52	−14	3	7–10	5–10	5–12	9–14	—	12–6
(Netherlands) GZC Donk	5	0	0	5	33	84	−51	0	10–22	1–18	8–16	8–16	6–12	—

=== Qualification round II ===
Eight teams took part in the second qualifying round. They were drawn into two groups of four teams, which played on 16−18 October 2015. The top two teams of each group advanced to the quarterfinals.

Key to colours in group tables
Top two advance to next round

==== Group C ====
Tournament was played in Naples, Italy.

Team	Pld	W	D	L	GF	GA	GD	Pts	KIN	SIN	FTC	ACH
(Russia) Kinef Kirishi	3	1	2	0	27	25	+2	5	—	9–9	8–8	10–8
(Russia) Sintez Kazan	3	1	1	1	29	23	+6	4	9–9	—	8–6	12–8
(Hungary) Ferencváros	3	1	1	1	21	22	−1	4	8–8	6–8	—	7–6
(Italy) Acquachiara	3	0	0	3	22	29	−7	0	8–10	8–12	6–7	—

==== Group D ====
Tournament was played in Split, Croatia.

Team	Pld	W	D	L	GF	GA	GD	Pts	MOR	SZE	CCN	JAD
(Croatia) Mornar	3	2	1	0	30	28	+2	7	—	12–11	7–7	11–10
(Hungary) Szeged	3	2	0	1	43	33	+10	6	11–12	—	18–12	14–9
(Italy) Canottieri Napoli	3	0	2	1	27	33	−6	2	7–7	12–18	—	8–8
(Croatia) Jadran Split	3	0	1	2	27	33	−6	1	10–11	9–14	8–8	—

== Knockout stage ==
=== Bracket ===
Quarter-finals
(Croatia) Mornar	14	9	23
(Romania) CSM Digi Oradea	9	13	22
(France) CN Marseille	8	10	18
(Russia) Sintez Kazan	9	11	20
(Russia) Kinef Kirishi	5	6	11
(Italy) AN Brescia	11	15	26
(Hungary) Szeged	9	8	17
(Germany) Waspo Hannover	3	13	16

Semi-finals
(Croatia) Mornar	9	7	16
(Russia) Sintez Kazan	7	12	19
(Italy) AN Brescia	9	15	24
(Hungary) Szeged	8	10	18

Final
(Russia) Sintez Kazan	4	6	10
(Italy) AN Brescia	11	12	23

=== Quarter-finals ===
Key to colours
Seeded in quarter finals draw
Unseeded in quarter finals draw

CL losers of QR3	EC first two of QR2
(Germany) Waspo Hannover	(Russia) Sintez Kazan
(Romania) Digi Oradea	(Croatia) Mornar
(France) CN Marseille	(Russia) Kinef Kirishi
(Italy) AN Brescia	(Hungary) Szeged

These teams played against each other over two legs on a home-and-away basis. The mechanism of the draws for each round was as follow:

- In the draw for the quarter-finals, the four group winners were seeded, and the four group runners-up were unseeded. The seeded teams were drawn against the unseeded teams, with the seeded teams hosting the second leg. Teams from the same association could not be drawn against each other.

The first legs were played on 11 November, and the second legs were played on 16 December 2015.

Team 1	Agg.	Team 2	1st leg	2nd leg
Kinef Kirishi (Russia)	11–26	(Italy) AN Brescia	5–11	6–15
Mornar (Croatia)	23–22	(Romania) Digi Oradea	14–9	9–13
CN Marseille (France)	18–20	(Russia) Sintez Kazan	8–9	10–11
Szeged (Hungary)	17–16	(Germany) Waspo Hannover	9–3	8–13

=== Semi-finals ===
The first legs were played on 3 February, and the second legs were played on 10 February 2016.

Team 1	Agg.	Team 2	1st leg	2nd leg
AN Brescia (Italy)	24–18	(Hungary) Szeged	9–8	15–10
Mornar (Croatia)	16–19	(Russia) Sintez Kazan	9–7	7–12

=== Final ===
The first leg were played on 16 April, and the second leg were played on 30 April 2016.

Team 1	Agg.	Team 2	1st leg	2nd leg
Sintez Kazan (Russia)	10–23	(Italy) AN Brescia	4–11	6–12

2015–16 LEN Euro Cup
Champions

AN Brescia
4th Cup

== See also ==
- 2015–16 LEN Champions League
