= Antonio Petković =

Croatian water polo player

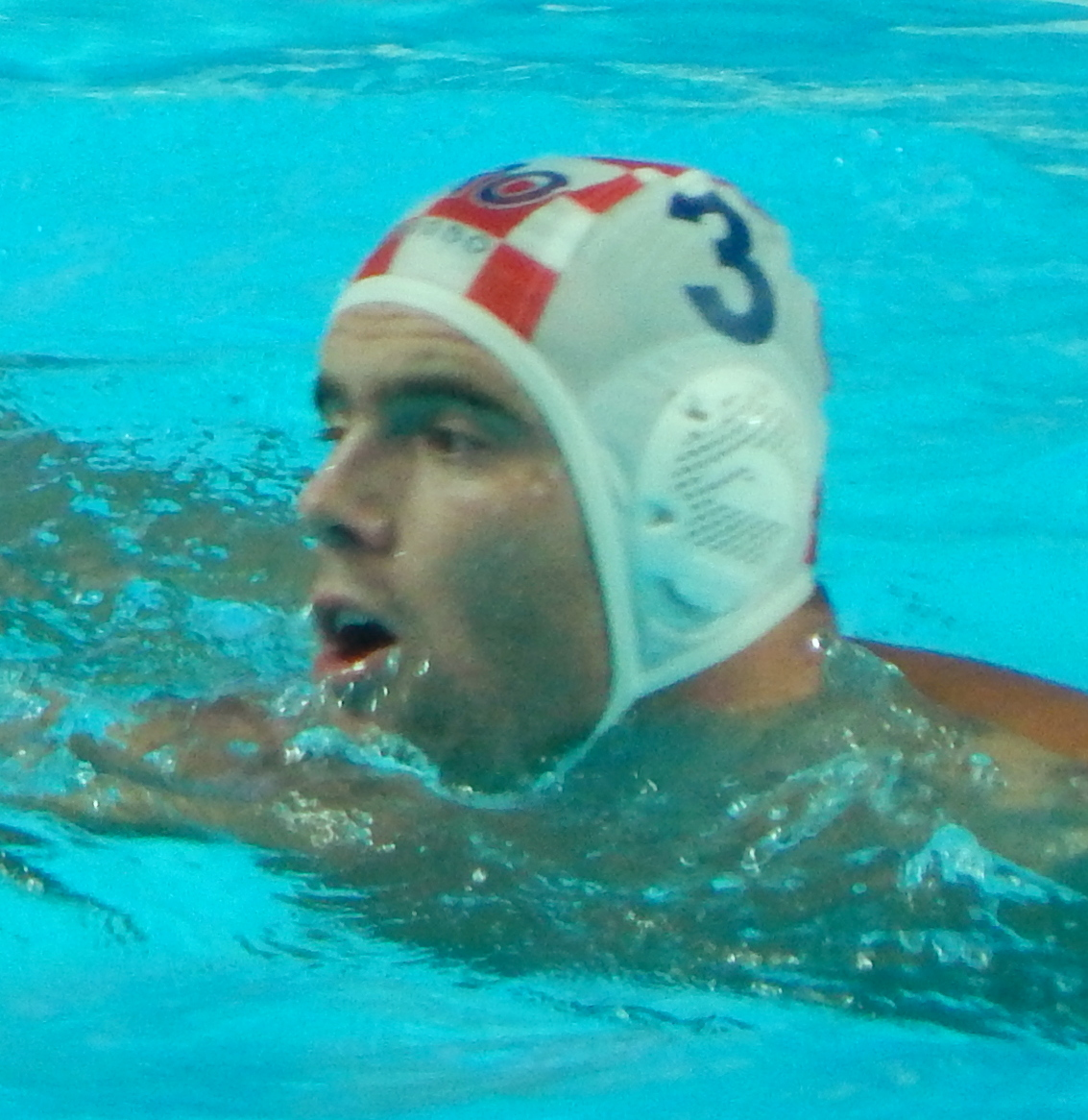
- Petković with Croatia at the 2015 World Championship

Personal information
- Nationality: Croatian
- Born: 11 January 1986 (age 40) Šibenik, SR Croatia, SFR Yugoslavia
- Height: 1.90 m (6 ft 3 in)
- Weight: 90 kg (198 lb)

Sport
- Sport: Water polo
Medal record
Representing Croatia
Olympic Games
Silver medal – second place	2016 Rio de Janeiro	Team
World Championships
Silver medal – second place	2015 Kazan	Team

Antonio Petković (born 11 January 1986) is a Croatian professional water polo coach and former player. He is the current head coach of VK Solaris.

He won silver medals at the 2015 World Championship and the 2016 Olympics with the Croatia national team.

== Orders ==
- Order of Danica Hrvatska with face of Franjo Bučar – 2016

== See also ==
- List of Olympic medalists in water polo (men)
- List of World Aquatics Championships medalists in water polo
