= Stadio Olimpico del Nuoto =

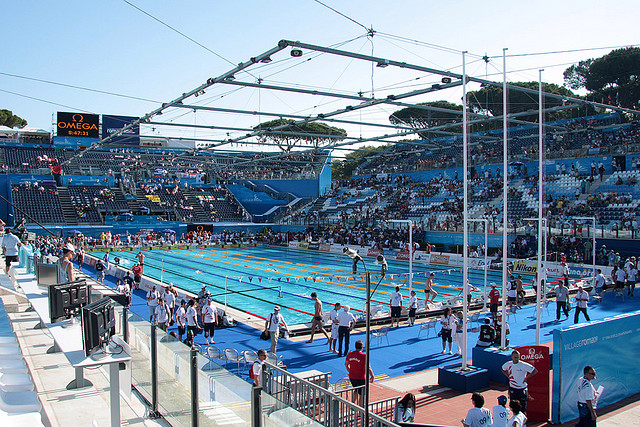
- 2009 FINA World swimming championships pool
- Click on the map for a fullscreen view

General information
- Location: Rome
- Coordinates: 41°55′46″N 12°27′27″E

The Stadio Olimpico del Nuoto (Olympic Swimming Stadium) is an aquatics centre at the Foro Italico in Rome, Italy. Inaugurated in 1959, it was designed by the architects Enrico Del Debbio and Annibale Vitellozzi to host the swimming, diving, water polo, and swimming portion of the modern pentathlon events for the 1960 Summer Olympics.

The venue was refurbished to host the 1983 European Aquatics Championships, and reconfigured and expanded for the 1994 World Aquatics Championships. The stadium was the main venue of the World Championships again in 2009, and hosted the European Aquatics Championships in 2022.

== Gallery ==
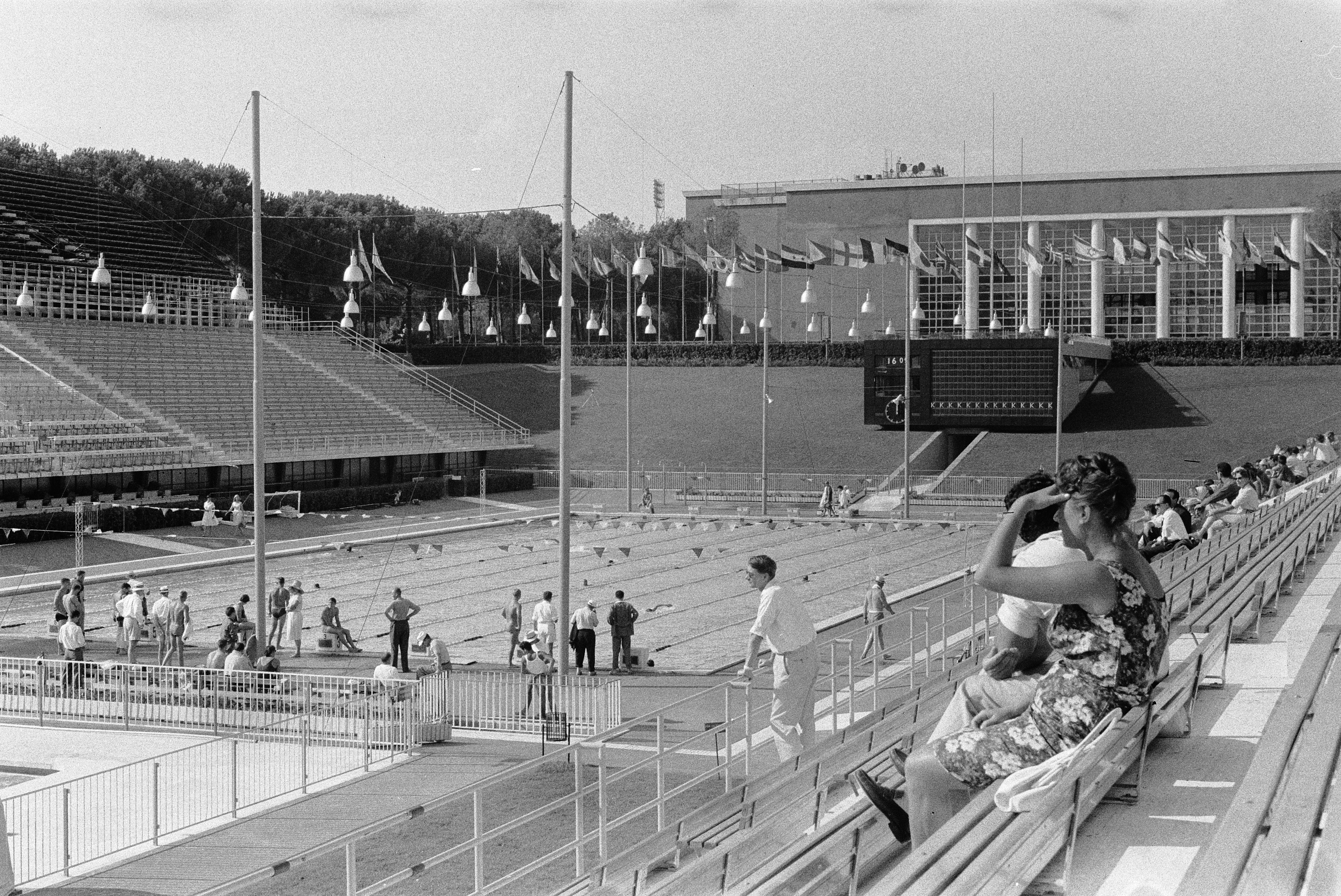
During the 1960 Summer Olympics

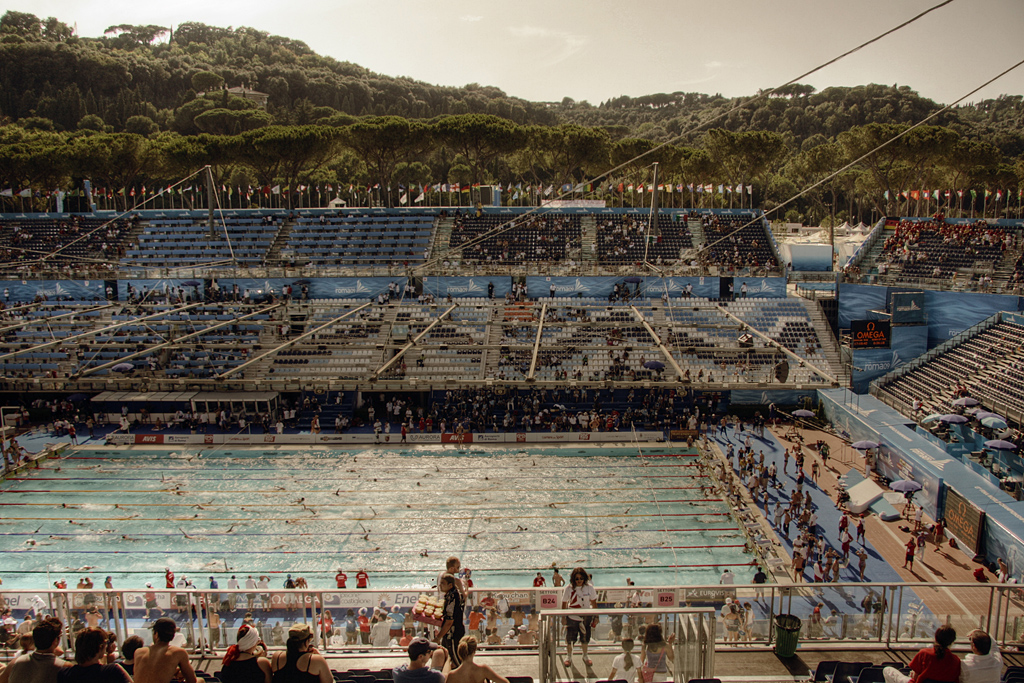
During the 2009 FINA World Aquatics Championships

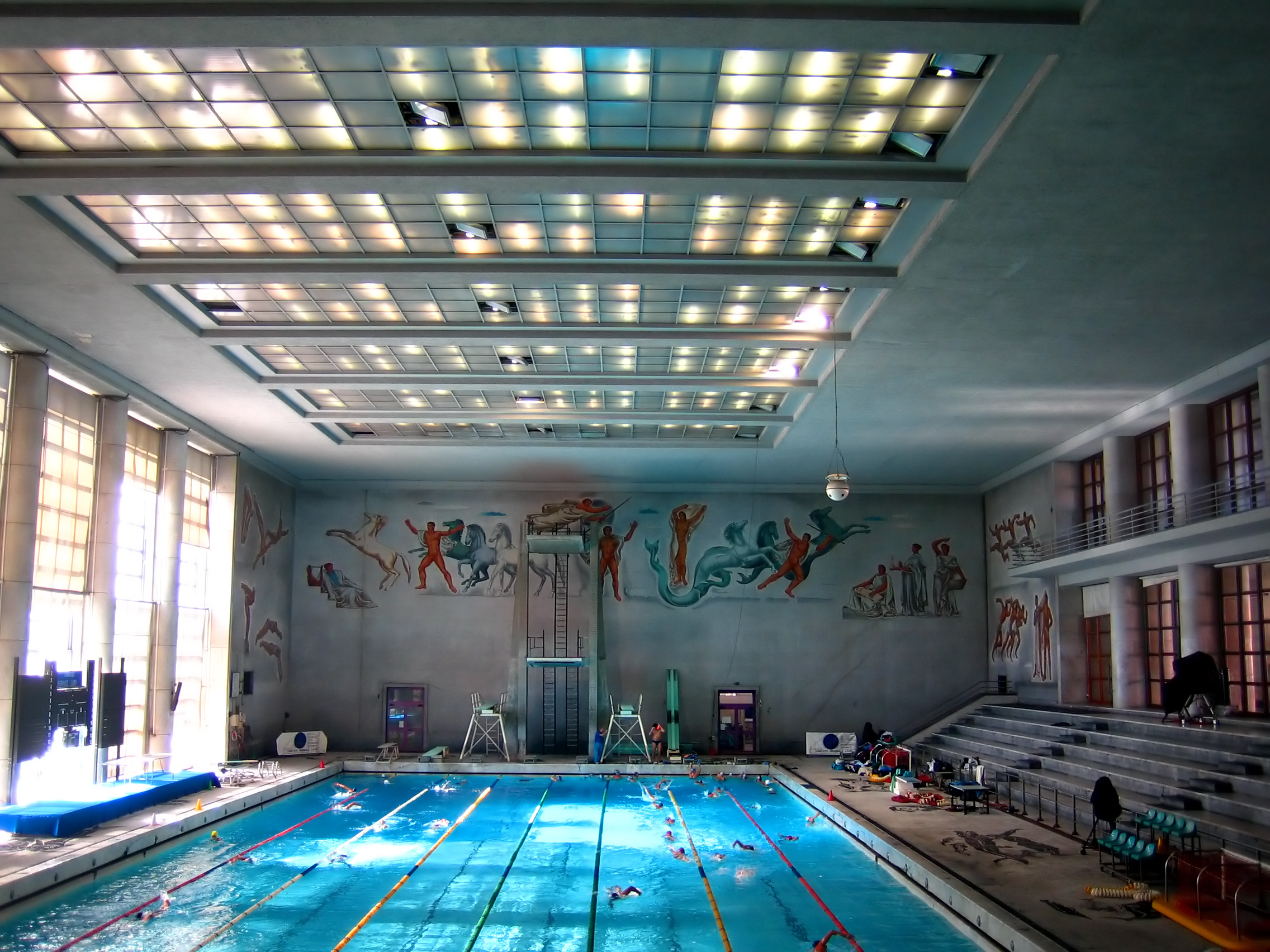
The indoor pool

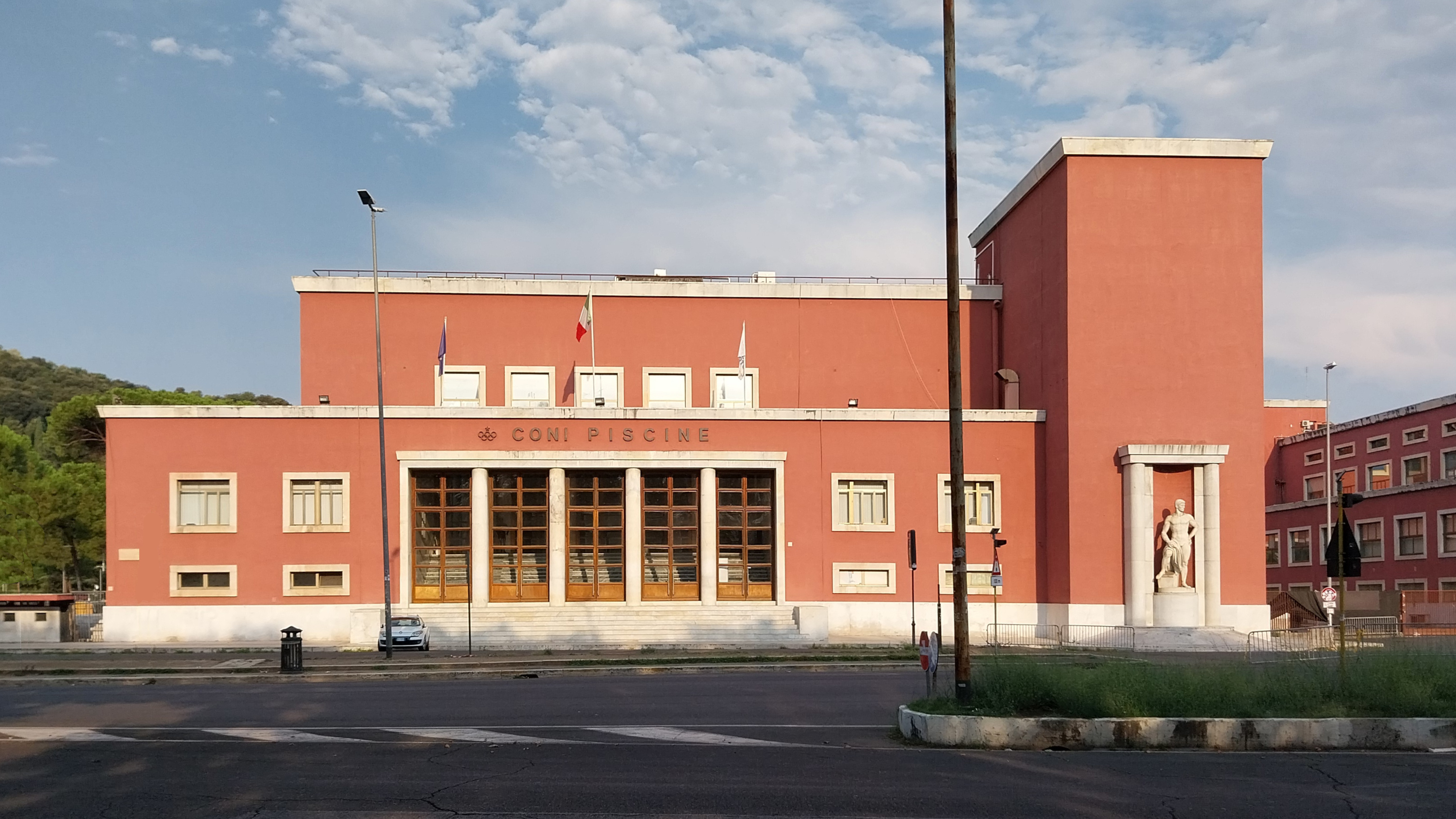
Outside of the indoor pool
