= RN Savona =

Rari Nantes Savona
- Founded: 1948; 78 years ago
- League: Serie A1
- Based in: Savona, Italy
- Arena: Piscina Carlo Zanelli (Capacity: 1,300)
- Colors
- President: Maurizio Maricone
- Head coach: Alberto Angelini
- Website: rarinantes.sv.it

Rari Nantes Savona is an aquatic sports club based in Savona, Italy, mainly known for its professional men's water polo team, which competes uninterruptedly in the Serie A1, the top division of Italian championship, since 1982; the team has been national champion for three times.

== History ==
The club was founded in 1948 by Mario Caviglione with a group of other water polo enthusiasts. After several years in the amateur leagues, in 1975 the club reached Serie B (back then the second tier of Italian championship) and achieved the promotion in Serie A six years later, in the 1981 season. The first game of Savona in the Top division was a 12−9 home victory against 1980 champions Canottieri Napoli, on 27 February 1982.

At the time, the club used to play its home games in the near Albissola Marina and at the Genoa's Crocera swimming pool. The city of Savona built an Olympic-sized pool in 1985, the Piscina Olimpica Comunale, renamed Piscina Carlo Zanelli in 2010 in honour of the recently deceased former mayor of the town. The pool has been the home field of the club ever since, except for a 5 years of absence from 2006 to 2010 due to restructuring works. During the break, the team used to play at the Piscina di Luceto in Albisola Superiore.

RN Savona emerged as a top team in the early 1990s. The first trophy of the Ligurian team's history is the 1989−90 Coppa Italia; in the following season, after two second places reached in 1983 and 1990, the club won its first Italian Championship and a second consecutive domestic Cup. Savona won its second Italian title in 1992 and the third in the 2004−05 season; since then the club managed to reach two back-to-back second places in 2009−10 and 2010−11 seasons, losing on both occasions the play-offs final to Pro Recco; the third Coppa Italia dates back to the 1992−93 season. The club made its international debut in the 1983 LEN Cup Winners' Cup. In 2012 the team, defeating in the final game Spain's CN Sabadell, won the first edition of the newly renamed LEN Euro Cup, a competition that the club already won twice in 2005 and 2011 when it was still called LEN Trophy; on all three occasions Savona earned the right to contest the LEN Super Cup, but never managed to achieve the trophy, being defeated twice by Italy's fellow sides CN Posillipo and Pro Recco and once by Serbia's VK Partizan. The best performance in the major European cup came in the 1991–92 season, when Savona reached the Final but lost to Croatia's Jadran Split.

== Honours ==
=== Domestic competitions ===
- Serie A1
  - Winners: 3 (1990−91, 1991−92, 2004−05)
  - Runners-up: 5 (1983, 1989−90, 1992−93, 2009−10, 2010−11)
- Coppa Italia
  - Winners: 3 (1989−90, 1990−91, 1992−93)
  - Runners-up: 7 (1986−87, 2004−05, 2005−06, 2007−08, 2008−09, 2009−10, 2012−13)

=== European competitions ===
- LEN Euro Cup
  - Winners: 3 (2004−05, 2010−11, 2011−12)
  - Runners-up: 1 (2009−10)
- LEN Champions League
  - Runners-up: 1 (1991−92)

== Recent seasons ==
Season	League			Coppa Italia		International	
Season	Division	Rank	Post season	Stage	Rank	Cup	Stage
2010–11	Serie A1	2nd	PO: Final	QR2	—	LEN Euroleague	QR2
2010–11	Serie A1	2nd	PO: Final	QR2	—	LEN Trophy	Winner
2011–12	Serie A1	4th	PO: Semifinals	QR2	—	LEN Champions League	QR2
2011–12	Serie A1	4th	PO: Semifinals	QR2	—	LEN Euro Cup	Winner
2012–13	Serie A1	6th	PO: Quarterfinals	F4: Final	2nd	LEN Euro Cup	Semifinals
2013–14	Serie A1	4th	PO: Semifinals	QR2	—	—	
2014–15	Serie A1	8th	PO: Quarterfinals	QR2	—	LEN Euro Cup	Quarterfinals
2015–16	Serie A1	6th	F6: Quarterfinals	Not qualified		—	
2016–17	Serie A1	6th	F6: Quarterfinals	F4: Semifinals	3rd	—	
2017–18	Serie A1	5th	F6: Quarterfinals	QR2	—	—	
2018–19	Serie A1	9th	—	QR	—	LEN Euro Cup	QR1
2019–20	Serie A1	5th^{1}	—^{1}	Cancelled^{1}		—	
2020–21	Serie A1	3rd	PO: Semifinals	QR2	—	LEN Euro Cup	QR
2021–22	Serie A1	3rd	PO: Semifinals	F4: Semifinals	3rd	LEN Champions League	QR3
2021–22	Serie A1	3rd	PO: Semifinals	F4: Semifinals	3rd	LEN Euro Cup	Quarterfinals
2022–23	Serie A1	6th	F6: Quarterfinals	F4: Semifinals	4th	LEN Champions League	QR2
2022–23	Serie A1	6th	F6: Quarterfinals	F4: Semifinals	4th	LEN Euro Cup	Finals
2023–24	Serie A1	2nd	PO: Final	F4: Semifinals	3rd	LEN Euro Cup	Quarterfinals
2024–25	Serie A1	3rd	PO: Semifinals	F4: Final	2nd	European Aquatics Champions League	QFR

PO: Play-offs; QR: Qualification round; QFR: Quarter-finals round; F6: Final 6; F4: Final 4.

^1 Cancelled due to the COVID-19 pandemic.

== Current roster ==
2019−20 season

Player	Birth Date	Pos.
(Italy) Jacopo Missiroli	7 February 1997 (age 29)	GK
(Italy) Nicolò Da Rold	26 June 2002 (age 23)	GK
(Italy) Stefano Morretti	15 January 1998 (age 28)	GK
(Italy) Andrea Grossi	20 February 2001 (age 25)	DF
(Italy) Federico Piombo	1 September 1998 (age 27)	DF
(Italy) Lorenzo Bianco	18 April 1995 (age 31)	DF
(Italy) Pietro Ricci	18 July 2002 (age 23)	DF
(Italy) Alessio Caldieri	12 February 2002 (age 24)	FP
(Italy) Andrea Patchaliev	31 May 2002 (age 24)	FP

Player	Birth Date	Pos.
(Italy) Eduardo Campopiano	8 April 1997 (age 29)	FP
(Italy) Filippo Taramasco	29 June 2001 (age 24)	FP
(Italy) Giorgio Boggiano	24 April 2002 (age 24)	FP
(Spain) Guillermo Molina	16 March 1984 (age 42)	CB
(Montenegro) Nebojša Vuškovič	21 January 2000 (age 26)	D
(Italy) Valerio Rizzo	21 September 1984 (age 41)	CF
(Italy) Ettore Novara	20 October 1999 (age 26)	CB
(Italy) Simone Bertino	13 March 2002 (age 24)	CB

Head coach: Alberto Angelini

== Notable former players ==
- (Italy) Matteo Aicardi
- (Italy) Alberto Angelini
- (Italy) Gianni Averaimo
- (Italy) Alessandro Bovo
- (Italy) Arnaldo Deserti
- (Spain) Manuel Estiarte
- (Italy) Maurizio Felugo
- (Italy) Massimiliano Ferretti
- (Italy) Marco Gerini
- (Italy) Massimo Giacoppo
- (Italy) Alex Giorgetti
- (Greece) Alexandros Gounas
- (Montenegro) Mlađan Janović
- (Socialist Federal Republic of Yugoslavia) Viktor Jelenić
- (Serbia and Montenegro) (Montenegro) Predrag Jokić
- (Hungary) Tamás Kásás
- (Hungary) (Italy) Tamás Märcz
- (Spain) (Brazil) Felipe Perrone
- (Romania) (Italy) Bogdan Rath
- (Serbia and Montenegro) (Serbia) Aleksandar Šapić
- (Socialist Federal Republic of Yugoslavia) (Croatia) Dubravko Šimenc
- (Serbia) (Brazil) Slobodan Soro
- (Hungary) István Udvardi
- (United States) Peter Varellas
- (Hungary) Zsolt Varga
- (Socialist Federal Republic of Yugoslavia) Mirko Vičević
- (Italy) (Croatia) Goran Volarević

== Synchronised swimming ==
In addition to the water polo team, Rari Nantes Savona also has a successful synchronised swimming section that was created in 1986 and has become a national top club since 1991 (when it reached the second place at the Italian championship). The team raised several international athletes like Giulia Lapi, multiple European medalist and part of the Italian Olympic team in Beijing 2008 and London 2012. The club won 15 synchronised swimming national overall championships.

- Honours:

Italian championships: 15 (1994, 1995, 1996, 2007, 2008, 2009, 2010, 2011, 2012, 2013, 2014, 2015, 2016, 2017, 2018)
