= RN Bogliasco =

Water polo club in Liguria, Italy

Bogliasco
- Founded: 1951; 75 years ago
- League: Serie A2
- Based in: Bogliasco, Italy
- Arena: Stadio Gianni Vassallo (Capacity: 600)
- Colors
- Championships: 1 Italian Leagues (Man); 1 Italian Cups (Women)
- Website: bogliasco1951.it

Bogliasco (Official name: Bogliasco 1951) is an Italian water polo club from Bogliasco in Liguria. The women's team currently plays in Serie A1, while the men's team plays in Serie A2.

== History ==
Bogliasco was founded in 1951 as Rari Nantes Bogliasco. It plays in the Serie A1, the Italian top division, for the first time in 1970.
In 1981 it won the Italian championship Serie A men's water polo. In 2016 the women's team won the Italian Cup. At youth level it is the most successful club in Italy, having won 35 national championships between men and women in the various categories.

== Honours ==
- Men
  - Serie A1
    - Winners (1): 1981
    - Runners-up (1): 1982
- Women
  - Coppa Italia
    - Winners (1): 2016

== Famous players ==
- (Italy) Eraldo Pizzo
- (Italy) Vittorio Crovetto
