= Coppa Italia (men's water polo) =

- Organising body: FIN
- Founded: 1970; 55 years ago
- Region: Italy
- Related competitions: Serie A1; Women's Coppa Italia
- Current champions: AN Brescia
- Most successful club(s): Pro Recco (17 titles)
- Television broadcasters: RAI, Waterpolo Channel

The men's Coppa Italia is the water polo domestic Cup of Italy. The trophy is organized by FIN and reserved to Serie A1 teams. The first edition took place in 1970 and the most successful club is Pro Recco, winner of the competition for 17 times.

== History and format ==
The first edition of the trophy was held in 1970 and was won by Canottieri Napoli. Later, Coppa Italia was held discontinuously except for a nine-years streak of back-to-back seasons between 1984–85 and 1992–93.

The trophy was resumed regularly starting from 2004–05 season. Since this last inception, the most successful team has been Pro Recco, which won the Cup for 13 times out of 15 editions. The trophy, as of the 2018–19 season, is contested by all the Serie A1 teams. The participants competes in one or two round-robin qualification stages and then face each other in a knock-out final round. In the most recent Olympic years (2016 and 2020), the Cup has been restricted to the teams ranked from 1st to 4th place in the first half of the Serie A1 regular season, due to the clubs' and National teams' overcrowded calendar.

== Winners ==
- 1970: Canottieri Napoli
- 1971–73: Not held
- 1974: Pro Recco
- 1975: Not held
- 1976: RN Florentia
- 1977–83: Not held
- 1984–85: Pescara
- 1985–86: Pescara
- 1986–87: CN Posillipo
- 1987–88: RN Arenzano
- 1988–89: Pescara
- 1989–90: RN Savona
- 1990–91: RN Savona
- 1991–92: Pescara
- 1992–93: RN Savona
- 1994–97: Not held
- 1997–98: Pescara
- 1999–2004: Not held
- 2004–05: Canottieri Bissolati
- 2005–06: Pro Recco
- 2006–07: Pro Recco
- 2007–08: Pro Recco
- 2008–09: Pro Recco
- 2009–10: Pro Recco
- 2010–11: Pro Recco
- 2011–12: AN Brescia
- 2012–13: Pro Recco
- 2013–14: Pro Recco
- 2014–15: Pro Recco
- 2015–16: Pro Recco
- 2016–17: Pro Recco
- 2017–18: Pro Recco
- 2018–19: Pro Recco
- 2019–20: not assigned due to the COVID-19 pandemic.
- 2020–21: Pro Recco
- 2021–22: Pro Recco
- 2022–23: Pro Recco
- 2023–24: AN Brescia

=== Titles by Club ===
#	Team	Titles
1	Pro Recco	17
2	Pescara	5
3	RN Savona	3
4	AN Brescia	2
5	Canottieri Napoli	1
5	RN Florentia	1
5	CN Posillipo	1
5	RN Arenzano	1
5	Canottieri Bissolati	1

== See also ==
- Coppa Italia (women's water polo)
