= RN Florentia =

Rari Nantes Florentia is an Italian water polo club from Florence. From the 2011–2012 season the men's team plays in the Serie A1, the top division of the Italian league.

== History ==
The sport activities of Rari Nantes Florentia began in 1904. From 1904 to 2009, the swimmers of the club have amassed eighty victories in the national championships. In water polo, introduced by the Genoese Pine Valley, the club has never relegated from the first division from 1929 to today and has won 9 championships, especially during the years 1930 and 1940. In 2000 and 2001, the men's team was ranked second behind the Posillipo. This position allows him to participate and win the LEN Cup Winners' Cup in 2001.

== Titles & achievements ==
=== Domestic competitions ===
Italian League

- Winners (9): 1932–33, 1933–34, 1935–36, 1936–37, 1937–38, 1939–40, 1947–48, 1975–76, 1979–80

Italian Cup

- Winners (1): 1975–76

=== European competitions ===
LEN Cup Winners' Cup

- Winners (1): 2000–01

LEN Euro Cup

- Runners-up (2): 2002–03, 2012–13

== Famous players ==
- (Italy) Guglielmo "Mino" Marsili
- (Italy) Leonardo Sottani
