= Circolo Canottieri Napoli =

Italian nautical club

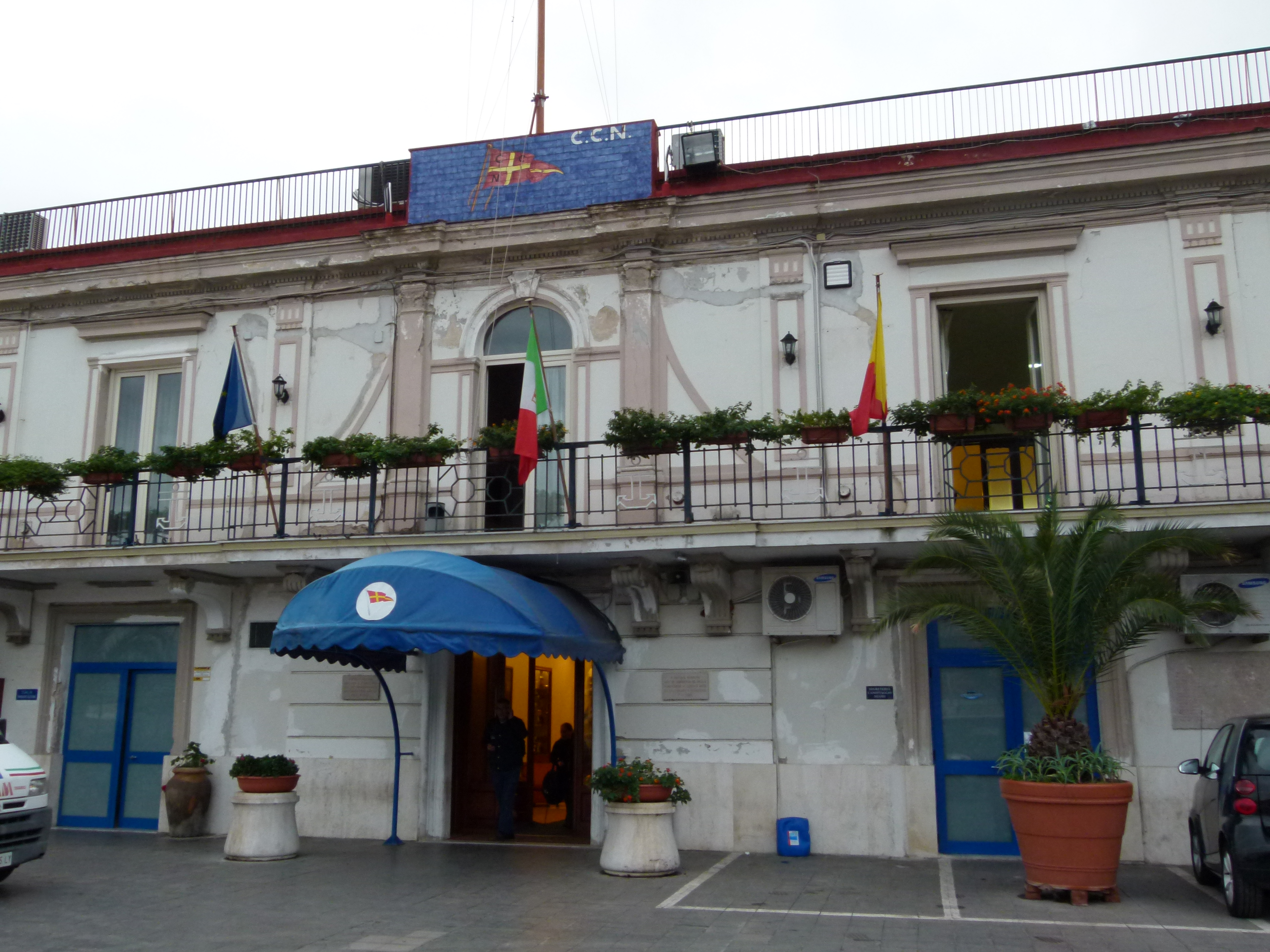
The entrance of Circolo Canottieri Napoli HQ.

Circolo Canottieri Napoli (English: Naples Rowing Club) is an Italian rowing club founded in 1914. Its headquarters are located in the Gardens of Molosiglio in San Ferdinando, overlooking the Bay of Naples. With more than a thousand members, the club offers a range of Olympic disciplines, including rowing, motorboat racing, swimming, water polo, tennis, triathlons, and more. The club's main facilities are situated in downtown Naples, housed in the municipal swimming pool on Ulisse Prota Giurleo Street.

== The headquarters ==
The club’s headquarters is located at the southwest corner of the Molosiglio Gardens, close to Acton Street and the adjacent port. Spanning an area of 7,000 sq. m, with 3,500 sq. m of covered facilities, it stands as one of the largest sailing clubs in Naples. The marina accommodates around 150 boats and serves as the base for speedboat and boating activities.

The headquarters features two swimming pools—one specifically for children and another built to FINA standards for competitive water sports. Additionally, the club includes two tennis courts.

== Sports activities ==
Canottieri Napoli organizes and participates in many sporting events at the national and international levels.

The men's water polo team competes in Italy's Serie A2 (men's water polo).

The club has organized a boating race in the Italian Championships 2012 for the category Offshore 3000. The race took place on June 2nd and 3rd in the waters off the promenade cittadino.

Circolo Canottieri Napoli also organizes several races. This sport has had a role in the World Series Naples 2012–2013 where it won America's Cup.

The triathlon is the newest sport introduced in the club.

== Water polo team ==
The Canottieri Napoli's water polo team has achieved success both in Italy and other European countries. Trophies won include several National championships and the 1978 European Championship.

=== Achievements ===
==== European competitions ====
- LEN Champions League
  - Winners (1): 1977–78
  - Runners-up (1): 1990–91
  - 3rd place (1): 1975–76
- LEN Super Cup
  - Runners-up (1): 1978

==== Domestic competitions ====
- Italian League
  - Winners (8): 1950–51, 1957–58, 1962–63, 1972–73, 1974–75, 1976–77, 1978–79, 1989–90.
- Italian Cup
  - Winners (1): 1969–70
