= AS Acquachiara =

- Founded: 1998
- League: Serie A1
- Based in: Naples
- Arena: Felice Scandone pool
- Colors: White and light blue
- President: Francesco Porzio
- Head coach: Paolo De Crescenzo
- Championships: 1 Italian League 2
- Website: https://web.archive.org/web/20150420080425/http://acquachiarasport.com/home.htm

AS Acquachiara (Associazione Sportiva Acquachiara) is an Italian water polo club based in Naples. The team competed in the Serie A1 and plays its games in Felice Scandone pool.

== History ==
Acquachiara was founded in 1998 and played for first time Serie A2 (South group), in the 2006–2007 season. In 2010–2011 the club finished in the top of the league regular season and won its first promotion to A1 beating in the final play off the Torino '81.

In 2014-15 season Acquachiara reached the LEN Euro Cup double final against Posillipo and lost the title.

The club has also a women's section that dispute the Serie A2.

== Honours ==
=== Domestic ===
Italian League 2

- Winners (1): 2010-11

=== European ===
LEN Euro Cup

- Runners-up (1): 2014-15
